= German military personnel of World War II of Jewish descent =

Overview of soldiers of Germany during World War II of Jewish descent

Some German Jews, and German people of varying Jewish ancestry (who were classified by Nazi Germany's antisemitic Nuremberg Laws as "Jewish Mischlinge"), served in Germany's Wehrmacht and related forces during World War II. The policy of the Wehrmacht towards "Mischlinge" personnel throughout the war was "erratic, ambivalent, and contradictory". Among those who served were Generalfeldmarschalls (field marshals), admirals, and generals. Around 20 soldiers of Jewish ancestry received the Knight's Cross of the Iron Cross.

== History ==
=== Nazi Germany policies on Jewish soldiers ===
An estimated 100,000 Jews fought for the German Empire during World War I. In 1919, the Imperial German Army was replaced by the Reichswehr. After the Nazi Party came to power in March 1933, the Reichswehr purged "full-blooded" Jews from its ranks in 1934; an estimated 70 personnel were dismissed. Reichspräsident Paul von Hindenburg disagreed with the policy; in a letter to Führer Adolf Hitler dated 4 April 1933, he stated, "If [Jews] were prepared to bleed and die for Germany, they deserve to be treated honorably by the Fatherland."

In April 1935, upon the replacement of the Reichswehr with the Wehrmacht, there was debate between those who favoured "Mischlinge" being conscripted for military service (such as Reichsminister of War Werner von Blomberg) and those who opposed this (such as Reichsleiter Martin Bormann). Hitler was reportedly nervous about compromising the strength of the Wehrmacht by dismissing "Mischlinge", which his general staff calculated would result in the loss of 45,000 personnel. On 21 May 1935, the Wehrmacht issued a decree (Wehrgesetz) which declared that only "Aryans" could serve in the military and banned "full Jews" from the Wehrmacht. Jews were envisaged as providing an auxiliary labour force during wartime and assigned to the Sturmabteilung Reserve II.

Under the 26 June 1936 Law for the Alteration of Military Service, "half-Jews" (German citizens with a Jewish parent) and "quarter-Jews" (German citizens with a Jewish grandparent) were entitled to, and required to, serve in the Wehrmacht. "Half-Jews", however, were prohibited from being promoted to non-commissioned officers. In late-1935, Bernhard Lösener of the Reich Ministry of the Interior estimated that there were 45,000 "half-Jews" of military age in Germany. Steven R. Welch argues that "the existence of this relatively substantial pool of potential soldiers may well have been one of the factors motivating the Nazi leadership to create a special category for half-Jews, thus preserving them for future use as soldiers."

An exception to these relaxations was the Schutzstaffel, which required all officers to prove "racial purity" back to 1750. In 1935, Emil Maurice - an early member of the National Socialist German Workers' Party and a founding member of the Schutzstaffel - was found to have one-eighth Jewish ancestry. Reichsführer-SS Heinrich Himmler recommended that Maurice and his relatives be expelled on the basis that they were a security risk, but was overruled by Hitler, who wrote to Himmler on 31 August 1935 compelling him to make an exception for Maurice and his brothers and informally declare them "Honorary Aryans". Similarly to the Schutzstaffel, the police forces of Nazi Germany sought to reduce the number of "half-Jews" and "quarter-Jews" serving in their ranks.

=== Beginning of World War II ===
Upon the outbreak of World War II in September 1939, thousands of "half-Jews" and "quarter-Jews" were conscripted for service in the Wehrmacht. They were not permitted to hold positions of authority, but were eligible for awards. The Ministry of the Interior drafted an edict stating that "half-Jews" and "quarter-Jews" who served as frontline soldiers would be deemed equivalent to persons of "German blood", other than still facing marriage restrictions, but it was not approved by Hitler.

Soldiers of Jewish descent took part in the German invasion of Poland in September-October 1939. During the campaign, several "Mischlinge" soldiers were decorated or promoted. The families of the "Mischlinge" soldiers back in Germany were "spared none of the usual indignities"; Clara von Mettenheim, a Jewish convert whose three sons were soldiers, wrote a letter of complaint to Generalfeldmarschall Walther von Brauchitsch in December 1939 in which she stated, "During the war, when my sons were fighting in Poland, we were tortured here on the home front as if there were no more important tasks to be done during the war". Von Mettenheim's son Dieter Fischer, a "half-Jew" soldier who had been decorated for bravery in the Polish campaign, had been obliged to accompany her to a police station for her to be assigned a "Jewish identity card" "under humiliating circumstances" while home on leave. The Kriegsmarine Maschinenmaat Rainer Beck's Jewish mother was forced out of a cellar during an air raid in Gliwice by the blockleiter.

During the Polish campaign, Rabbi Yosef Yitzchak Schneersohn, the sixth Lubavitcher Rebbe, found himself trapped in Warsaw. Following a lobbying campaign by the Washington, D.C.-based attorney Max Rhoade, the German diplomat Helmuth Wohlthat agreed to arrange for Schneersohn to be evacuated from Poland in an attempt to maintain good relations with the United States. Wohlthat approached Admiral Wilhelm Canaris, who instructed Major Ernst Bloch to rescue Schneersohn. Bloch, a veteran of World War I, was the son of a Jewish father who had converted to Christianity and an Aryan mother who was described as an "assimilated half-Jew". In November 1939, Bloch located Schneersohn and dispatched him and his family on a train to Berlin under the pretence of being prisoners. Schneersohn in turn travelled to Latvia and then on to safety in the United States. In 1944, Bloch (by then holding the rank of Oberst) was forced out of the Abwehr following the 20 July plot, dying the next year in the Battle of Berlin while fighting for the Volkssturm.

=== Secret directive of 8 April 1940 ===
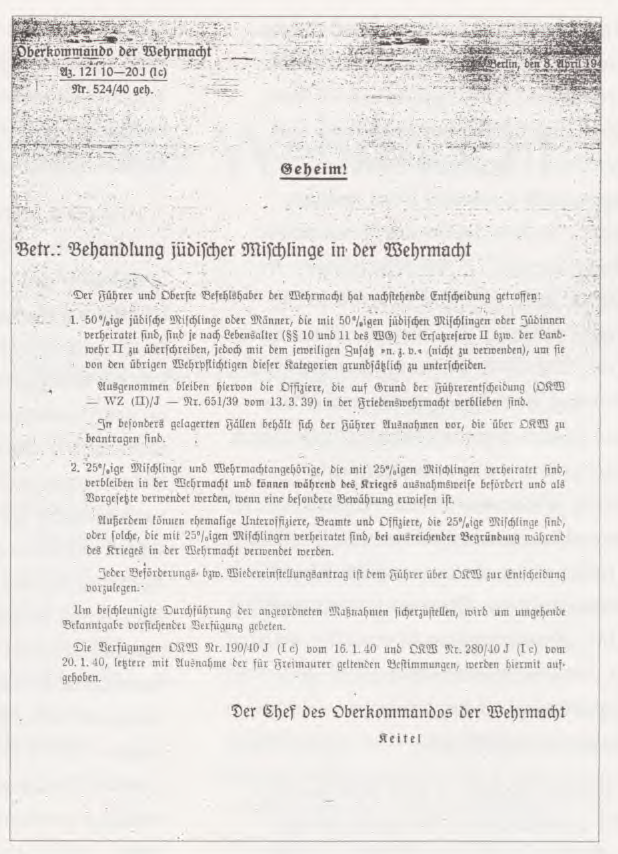
The secret directive issued by the Oberkommando des Heeres on 8 April 1940 ordering the dismissal of "half-Jews" from the Wehrmacht.

On 28 March 1940, Werner Blankenburg of the Kanzlei des Führers der NSDAP (KdF) wrote to Major Gerhard Engel, Hitler's army adjutant, noting the problems for morale caused by the treatment of "half-Jews" and "quarter-Jews" while on leave, and the consequent risks associated with their having access to military secrets, proposing the exclusion of "half-Jews" from the Wehrmacht. On 8 April 1940, Hitler issued a secret directive to the Wehrmacht instructing it to immediately purge all "half-Jews" and soldiers married to "half-Jews" other than in special cases by reassigning them to reserve forces with a note that they were not to be used. "Half-Jews" could be granted various dispensations enabling them simply to remain in the Wehrmacht; to remain and be promoted; or to remain, be promoted, and be entitled to declare themselves "of German blood". "Quarter-Jews" and soldiers married to "quarter-Jews" were permitted to remain but were prohibited from serving as non-commissioned officers other than in special circumstances. Some personnel duly turned themselves in; on one occasion, a commanding officer summarily executed a Jewish soldier, "infuriated at having his ranks sullied". Some commanding officers ignored the directive. Enforcement varied across the Wehrmarcht; the decree was entirely ignored in the Afrika Korps, while implementation was postponed in the Kriegsmarine. Some personnel of Jewish descent falsified papers and concealed their circumcisions. In September 1940, the Oberkommando des Heeres (OKH) stated that "again and again cases have come to the attention of the OKH in which Jewish Mischlinge of the first degree (50%) or soldiers married to such Jewish Mischlinge are still in active military service in violation of the [8 April 1940] order" and insisted that all active personnel sign a declaration relating to their racial status. It is estimated that tens of thousands of personnel of Jewish descent remained in the Wehrmacht following the directive. As Operation Weserübung (the invasion of Denmark and Norway) began on 9 April 1940, there was no time for "half-Jews" in the units taking place in these campaigns to be removed.

Some personnel of Jewish descent who served in the Wehrmacht were unaware of their ancestry and did not consider themselves Jewish. Others concealed their Jewish descent in order to join the Wehrmacht for reasons such as avoiding starvation; service in the Wehrmacht was described as "the safest place for a Jew in Hitler's Germany". James F. Tent writes, "Mischlinge found one thin silver lining upon entering the Wehrmacht. They received a certain shielding from National Socialist laws because they operated under the Wehrmacht's own military justice system." Some personnel of Jewish descent viewed serving in the Wehrmacht as a means of protecting their families. Some were passionately German and sought to prove their identity and patriotism via military service, and hoped that frontline service would entitle them to be reclassified as "full Germans". Jakob Benecke states, "The security the service, and especially exemplary dedication in the Wehrmacht [...] offered to "Mischlinge" could range from protection from anti-Semitic discrimination through the [Nazi] state to the sheer securing of survival [...] In addition, such commitment for the "national community" could have relieving or lifesaving effects on close relatives of "Mischlinge"."

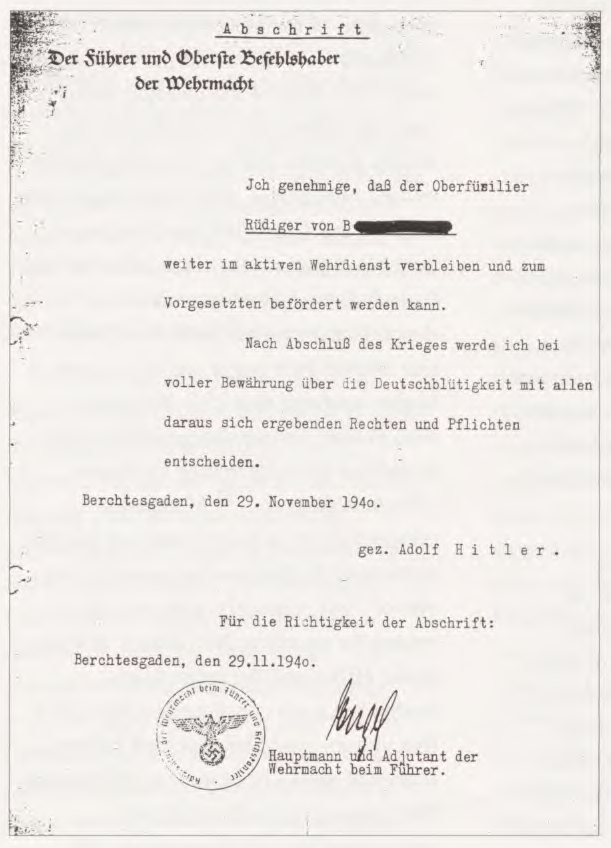
A letter from Adolf Hitler to the "Mischlinge" soldier Rüdiger von B- authorising him to remain in the Wehrmacht and receive promotion, dated 29 November 1940.

Some "well-placed" persons of mixed "Aryan" and "non-Aryan" descent, such as Generalfeldmarschall Erhard Milch and General der Flieger Helmuth Wilberg, were granted German Blood Certificates. Referring to Milch, Chief of the Luftwaffe High Command Hermann Göring reportedly stated, "I decide who is a Jew in the Luftwaffe". In July 1941, Hitler introduced a policy that allowed "half-Jew" Wehrmacht veterans dismissed as a result of the 8 April 1940 directive to apply to re-join the Wehrmacht if they had previously won an Iron Cross or campaign citation, subject to Hitler's personal approval.

Daniel Uziel writes, "One of the strangest chapters in the history of the Wehrmacht Propaganda Troops is connected with the fact that several Jews and Mischlinge were able to pass through the strict personnel filters and serve in their ranks." Uziel writes that in 1941, Captain Edgar Jacoby–who had previously worked in the German film industry–was appointed commander of Propandakompanie 696, a company within the Wehrmacht Propaganda Troops. Shortly after being appointed, Jacoby was found to be a "full Jew". He was swiftly transferred to the reserve officer corps, then court-martialed for providing false information and sentenced to six months in military prison. He was released before completing his sentence, discharged from the Wehrmacht, and survived the remainder of the War without being further persecuted.

On 25 September 1942, the OKH again called for the dismissal of all "half-Jews" remaining in the Wehrmacht. In the same month, 118 "Mischlinge" soldiers and their wives were declared German, while 258 "Mischlinge" soldiers were declared eligible to become officers.

=== Latter years of World War II ===
As the war progressed, growing personnel shortages "allow[ed] some Mischlinge to occupy positions befitting their expertise". Conversely, however, measures targeting personnel of Jewish descent escalated as the war continued. Despite its role in expelling people of Jewish descent from the military, in summer 1943 the KdF complained that "Mischlinge" were "escaping" military service. That year, in the wake of the German defeat in the Battle of Stalingrad, the OKH began developing proposals for "military use of Jewish Mischlinge until then excluded from military service and of citizens related by marriage to Jews". The KdF responded that this utilisation should be restricted to "Mischlinge" serving in construction labour battalions deployed in "especially unhealthy swamps". In June 1943, Hitler instructed Joseph Goebbels to prepare proposals for forced labour by "Mischlinge". In July 1943, it was proposed that the "Mischlinge" in question would be inducted into the Wehrmacht and utilised as labour battalions for clearing bomb damage. In August 1943, the proposals were blocked by Wilhelm Keitel, the head of the OKH, who felt that Goebbels had bypassed him.

By 1944, knowledge of the Holocaust amongst Jews was widespread. As Germany's fortunes in the war continued to decline and the treatment of "Mischlinge" became more severe, "some Jews began to flee their battalions". In September 1944, Rainer Beck - who had a Jewish mother - deserted his unit in IJmuiden after coming to believe he would be murdered as part of the Holocaust; he had previously remarked to his sister "I wear the uniform of the people who want to destroy us." (Beck surrendered to the Allies in Amsterdam following the German surrender in May 1945; on 13 May 1945 he was killed by other German prisoners-of-war for desertion following an illegal court martial.) Some "Mischlinge" continued to serve in the Wehrmacht while members of their families were being deported, while some participated in the Holocaust.

Also in 1944, Hitler signed declarations for 77 high-ranking Wehrmacht officers who were "of mixed Jewish race or married to a Jew", asserting that they were of "German blood". The 77 officers were discharged from the Wehrmacht later that year following the 20 July plot. In November 1944, the OKH ordered that any "half-Jews" still in the Wehrmacht were to be expelled and arrangements made for their arrest by the Gestapo.

In January 1945, the Orthodox yeshiva student Simon Gossel, who had spent two years in Auschwitz concentration camp, was transported by boxcar back to Germany. During the journey, the train was stopped and the guards, seeking "every man they could for the war effort", instructed "German" prisoners to get out. Despite being circumcised and having an Auschwitz tattoo, Gossel was able to masquerade as an "ethnic German", and went on to serve in the Wehrmacht, enabling him to survive the remainder of the war.

=== People of Jewish descent in non-combat roles ===
Beyond personnel of Jewish descent serving in the Wehrmacht, Jewish slave labour was utilised extensively to support the German war effort, with captive Jews forced to perform tasks such as digging anti-tank ditches, repairing vehicles, demining, digging underground tunnels, and manufacturing equipment such as uniforms, artillery shells, and V-2 rockets.

In May 1942, a disagreement arose between the Wehrmacht and the Schutzstaffel when plans by the Wehrmacht to utilise 100,000 skilled Jewish workers to take up armament industry roles in the Generalgouvernement to replace Polish and Ukrainian workers (who had been sent to Germany as slave labourers) were compromised by the Schutzstaffel deporting Jewish workers with little warning. In July 1942, an agreement was reached between the Wehrmacht and the Schutzstaffel that armament industries would be given access to a "fixed and limited" number of Jewish workers, with the Schutzstaffel to notify the Wehrmacht in advance of further deportations.

In September 1942, Field Marshal Wilhelm Keitel of the Oberkommando der Wehrmacht (OKW) ordered that all Jews engaged in armament production in the Generalgouvernement were to be replaced by Poles; in response, General Curt Ludwig von Gienanth (the commander of the Wehrmacht in the Generalgouvernement) argued that the removal of Jews was resulting in a "a decline in the military potential of the Reich". In October 1942, General Siegfried Haenicke (who had been appointed to replace von Gienanth) was ordered by the OKW to remove Jews from armaments factories in the Generalgouvernement and replace them with "Aryan forces". This order "signified that Wehrmacht intervention in Jewish affairs had come to an end and responsibility for the entire matter—including workers in the Wehrmacht enterprises themselves—had been turned over to the [Schutzstaffel]".

Beginning in autumn 1944, between 10,000 and 20,000 "half-Jews" and persons related to Jews by "mixed marriage" were recruited into special units of the Organisation Todt, a civil and military-based engineering programme that utilised forced labour to deliver large-scaled construction projects throughout Germany and German-occupied Europe.

=== Post-World War II ===
Following the end of the war, some veterans of Jewish descent were ostracised by other Jews. The topic of Wehrmacht soldiers of partial Jewish descent was considered a "somewhat taboo" subject by many academics. Beate Meyer wrote in 1999, "The chequered history of "Mischlinge" in the German Wehrmacht has so far been researched only to a limited extent."

== Personnel ==
Historian Bryan Mark Rigg estimates up to 150,000 people of Jewish descent (6,000 "full Jews", (Note: Rigg writes, "When full Jews served in the Wehrmacht—I estimate their numbers to be a few thousand—it was only with false documents. As far as their superiors were concerned, they were 'Aryans' and were treated accordingly.") 60,000 first-degree "half-Jews" and 90,000 second-degree "quarter-Jews") served in the Germany military during World War II, representing fewer than 1% of all soldiers. Historian Raul Hilberg stated "we have known that there were thousands of ["Mischlinge"] in the German army" but disputed Rigg's estimate. Steven R. Welch writes, "The exact number of Mischlinge who served in the Wehrmacht is unknown. In his memoirs Helmut Kruger notes that documents he had consulted listed a total of 80,000 in 1943/44. This figure almost certainly includes Mischlinge of both first and second degree as well as soldiers married to Mischlinge."

=== Notable cases ===
German military personnel of World War II of Jewish descent, sorted by surname in alphabetical order:

Name	Born	Died	Branch	Rank	Service	Notes
Paul Ernst Fackenheim	1892		Abwehr		1941–1945	
Werner Goldberg	1919	2004	Heer	Schütze	1938–1940	His photograph appeared in the Berliner Tageblatt as "The Ideal German Soldier", and was used in Wehrmacht recruitment posters and propaganda. Expelled from the Army following the 8 April 1940 directive.
Ivar Lissner	1909	1967	Abwehr		1938–1945	
Günther Freiherr von Maltzahn	1910	1953	Luftwaffe	Oberst	1931–1945	Ace pilot credited with 68 aerial victories.
Emil Maurice	1897	1972	Schutzstaffel/Luftwaffe	Oberführer	1919–1945	Declared an Honorary Aryan.
Erhard Milch	1892	1972	Luftwaffe	Generalfeldmarschall	1933–1945	Granted a German Blood Certificate.
Solomon Perel	1925	2023	Heer		1944–1945	Drafted into the army as an infantryman and assigned to guard a bridge armed with a Panzerfaust. Captured by the United States Army on 20 April 1945 and released the next day as a junior conscript.
Bernhard Rogge	1899	1982	Kriegsmarine	Vizeadmiral	1915–1945	
Oskar Romm	1919	1993	Luftwaffe	Oberleutnant	1939–1945	Ace pilot credited with 83 aerial victories.
Helmut Schmidt	1918	2015	Luftwaffe	Oberleutnant	1937–1945	Chancellor of West Germany.
Boris Shteifon	1881	1945	Russian Protective Corps		1941–1944	Former lieutenant general in the Imperial Russian Army.
Siegfried Simsch	1913	1944	Luftwaffe	Hauptmann	1940–1944	Ace pilot credited with 54 aerial victories.
Melitta Schenk Gräfin von Stauffenberg	1903	1945	Luftwaffe	Flugkapitän (honorary)	1939–1945	Female test pilot.
Alexander Wienerberger	1891	1955	Russian Liberation Army		1944–1945	Photographed Holodomor atrocities.
Helmuth Wilberg	1880	1941	Luftwaffe	General der Flieger	1899–1941	Reclassified as Aryan by Hermann Göring.

== Media ==
The 1990 historical war drama film Europa Europa is based on the 1989 autobiography of Solomon Perel, a German-Jewish boy who escaped the Holocaust by masquerading as a Volksdeutscher and eventually joining the Wehrmacht.

In 2002, the historian Bryan Mark Rigg published Hitler's Jewish Soldiers: The Untold Story of Nazi Racial Laws and Men of Jewish Descent in the German Military. Rigg's claims that there were more than 100,000 partly Jewish soldiers were viewed with skepticism by some other historians, with Raul Hilberg dismissing the figure as "preposterous". Hilberg believed that the actual number was "thousands".

A documentary by Larry Price about soldiers of Jewish ancestry under Nazi Germany, Hitler's Jewish Soldiers, premiered on 24 April 2006 on Channel 1. The documentary featured interviews with five soldiers of Jewish ancestry who served in the German military during World War II.

== See also ==
- German Jewish military personnel of World War I
- History of the Jews during World War II
- Jewish collaboration with Nazi Germany
- Jews in the Allied Forces
- Who is a Jew?
