= Oskar Romm =

German World War II fighter pilot (1919–1993)

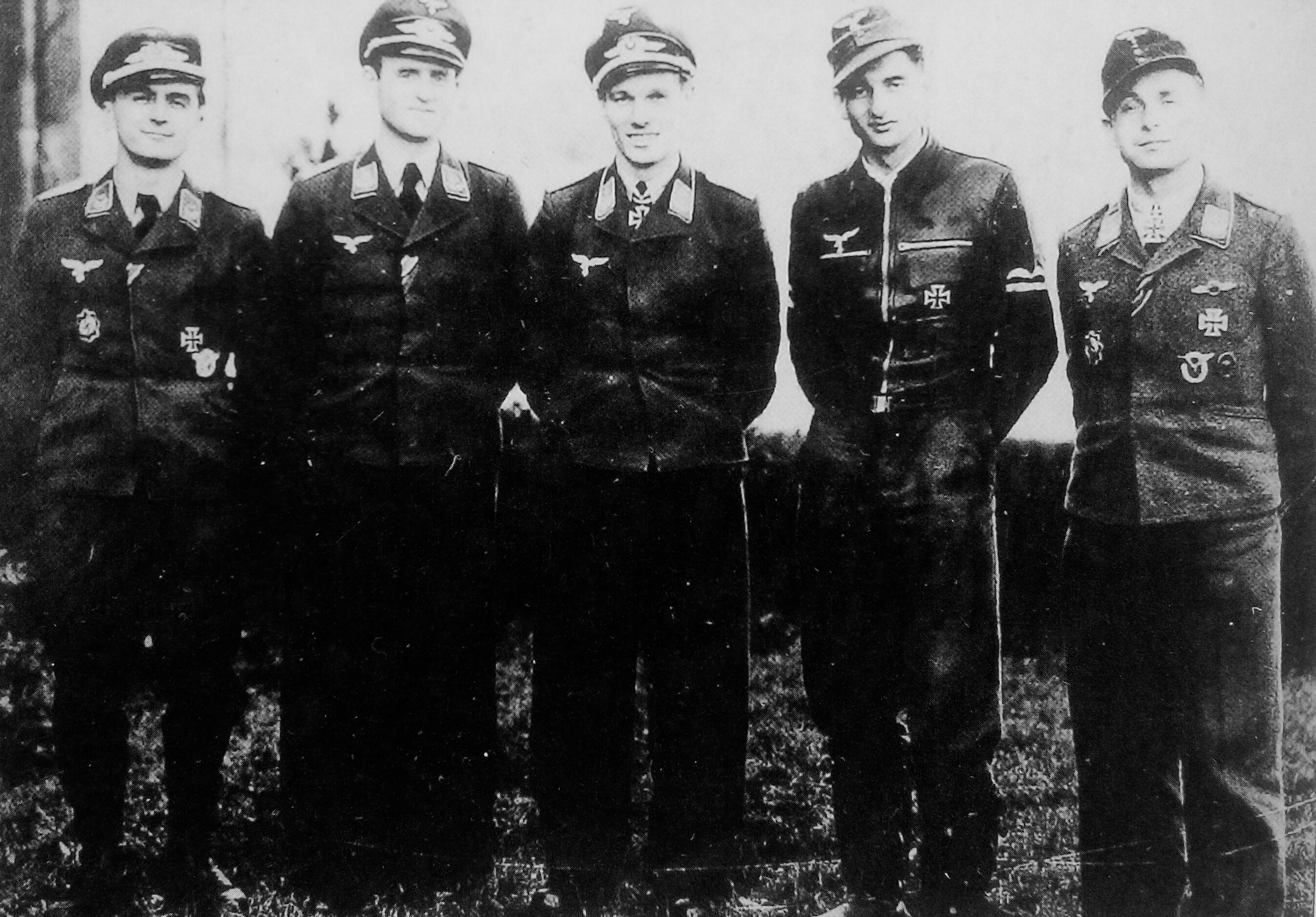
- Romm (center), Willy Unger (right)
- Born: 18 December 1919; Hejnice, Czechoslovakia
- Died: 1 May 1993 (aged 73); Waldesch, Germany
- Military career
- Allegiance: Nazi Germany (to 1945)
- Branch: Luftwaffe
- Service years: 1939–1945
- Rank: Oberleutnant (first lieutenant)
- Nickname: "Ossi"
- Units: JG 51, JG 3
- Commands: IV./JG 3
- Conflicts: See battles World War II: Eastern Front; Battle of Kursk; Defense of the Reich
- Awards: Knight's Cross of the Iron Cross

Oskar "Ossi" Romm (18 December 1919 – 1 May 1993) was a German Luftwaffe military aviator and fighter ace during World War II. He is credited with 92 aerial victories achieved in 283 combat missions, 54 of which were close air support missions. This figure includes 82 aerial victories on the Eastern Front, and further ten victories over the Western Allies, including eight four-engined heavy bombers.

Born in Hejnice, Romm, a half-Jew by the Nuremberg Laws, joined the military service in the Luftwaffe in 1939. Following flight training, he was posted to Jagdgeschwader 51 "Mölders" (JG 51—51st Fighter Wing) which was fighting in 1942. Flying with this wing, Romm claimed his first aerial victory on 4 December 1942 on the Eastern Front. Following his 76th aerial victory, he was awarded the Knight's Cross of the Iron Cross on 29 February 1944. He was then transferred to Jagdgeschwader 3 "Udet" (JG 3—3rd Fighter Wing) which was fighting in defense of the Reich on the Western Front. Here, he was made Staffelkapitän (squadron leader) of 12. Staffel (12th squadron) of JG 3 in July 1944. In February 1945, he was appointed Gruppenkommandeur (group commander) of IV. Gruppe (4th group) of JG 3. He flew his last mission on 24 April when he was wounded in an aircraft crash. Romm died on 1 May 1993 in Waldesch, Germany.

== Early life and career ==
Romm was born on 18 December 1919 in Hejnice, Haindorf in German, within Czechoslovakia. According to Bryan Mark Rigg, Romm was a half-Jew by the Nuremberg Laws who joined the Luftwaffe and served with distinction. (Note: see also German Jewish military personnel of World War II) He entered the Luftwaffe in October 1939 and following flight and fighter pilot training, (Note: Flight training in the Luftwaffe progressed through the levels A1, A2 and B1, B2, referred to as A/B flight training. A training included theoretical and practical training in aerobatics, navigation, long-distance flights and dead-stick landings. The B courses included high-altitude flights, instrument flights, night landings and training to handle the aircraft in difficult situations.) In September 1942, Romm was posted to 1. Staffel (1st squadron) of Jagdgeschwader 51 "Mölders" (JG 51—51st Fighter Wing), a squadron of I. Gruppe (1st group) of JG 51.

== World War II ==
World War II in Europe had begun on Friday, 1 September 1939, when German forces invaded Poland. In June 1941, German forces had launched Operation Barbarossa, the invasion of the Soviet Union. At the time of Romm's posting to JG 51, I. Gruppe was based at Jesau, present-day Juschny, located southeast of Königsberg, for conversion training to the Focke-Wulf Fw 190 radial engine fighter. Following the conversion, the Gruppe was sent to Lyuban on the Eastern Front on 10 September. Here, the Gruppe was subordinated to the Geschwaderstab of Jagdgeschwader 54 (JG 54—54th Fighter Wing) in the combat area of Army Group North. Here on 29 September, Romm's Fw 190 A-3 (Werknummer 2279—factory number) suffered engine failure, resulting in a belly landing near Shlisselburg. Romm sustained minor injuries in this accident.

On 17 October 1942, I. Gruppe of JG 51 was detached from control of JG 54 began relocation to an airfield at Vyazma, in the combat area of Army Group Centre, where it became fully operational again on 23 October. Here on 22 November, Romm made an emergency landing in his Fw 190 A-3 (Werknummer 0291) again due to engine failure 5 kilometers (3.1 miles) north of Sychyovka. Fighting in the Battle of Velikiye Luki, Romm claimed his first aerial victory on 4 December in support of 9th Army near Rzhev when he shot down an Ilyushin Il-2 ground-attack aircraft.

On 5 July 1943, German forces launched Operation Citadel, which initiated the Battle of Kursk. The battle began on 5 July 1943 with I. Gruppe of JG 51 supporting the German 9th Army in its northern attack on the Kursk salient. For the first days of the operation, I. Gruppe primary task was to provide fighter escort for the bombers of Kampfgeschwader 4, Kampfgeschwader 51 and Kampfgeschwader 53, as well as for the Junkers Ju 87 dive bombers of Sturzkampfgeschwader 1. That day, Romm claimed two aerial victories, taking his total to ten, an Il-2 ground-attack aircraft and a Mikoyan-Gurevich MiG-3 fighter. In the early morning of 8 July, 1. Flieger-Division (1st Air Division) intercepted Soviet radio communication and ordered I. Gruppe of JG 51 to engage a large formation of Il-2 ground-attack aircraft from 299 ShAD (Shturmovaya Aviatsionnyy Diveeziya—Ground Attack Air Division). The Luftwaffe fighters engaged 30 Il-2s, escorted by 15 Soviet fighters, in the area of Fatezh. In this encounter, four Il-2s were shot down, including one by Romm.

In September 1943, Romm was transferred to Ergänzungs-Jagdgruppe Ost, specialized training unit for new fighter pilots destined for the Eastern Front, as an instructor. During this assignment, he was awarded the German Cross in Gold (Deutsches Kreuz in Gold) on 17 October. He was awarded his Knight's Cross of the Iron Cross (Ritterkreuz des Eisernen Kreuzes) on 29 February 1944 when his victory score stood at 76.

=== Western Front ===
By late May 1944, 2. Staffel of JG 51 had been staffed with a full complement of 16 pilots, including Romm. The Staffel was ordered to relocate to the Western Front where it was attached to IV. Sturmgruppe of Jagdgeschwader 3 "Udet" (JG 3—3rd Fighter Wing) as fourth squadron fighting in Defense of the Reich. There, the Staffel was underwent conversion training to the Fw 190 radial engine powered fighter aircraft. At the time, IV. Sturmgruppe was based at Salzwedel and commanded by Hauptmann Wilhelm Moritz.

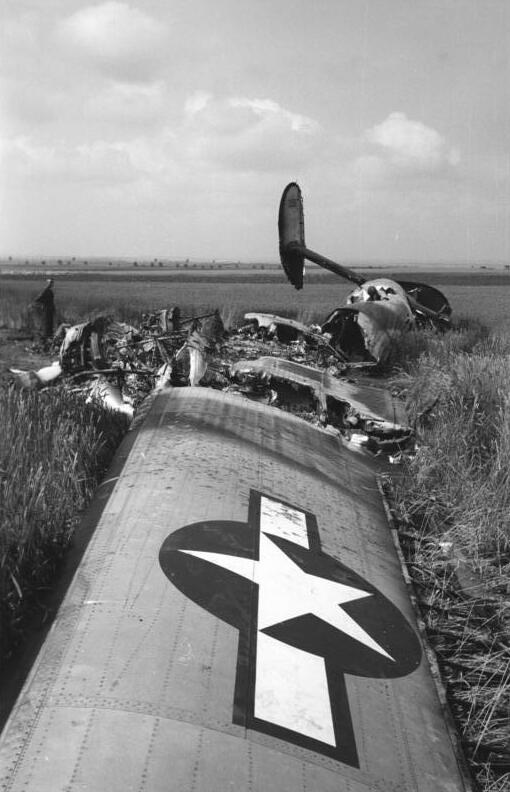
Downed B-24 of the 492nd Bomb Group after an aerial battle over Oschersleben on 7 July 1944

Romm was appointed Staffelkapitän (squadron leader) of 12. Sturmstaffel of JG 3 on 7 July 1944. He replaced Oberleutnant Hans Rachner who had been killed in action that day. On 7 July, a force of 1,129 B-17 Flying Fortress and B-24 Liberator bombers of the United States Army Air Forces (USAAF) Eighth Air Force had set out from England to bomb aircraft factories in the Leipzig area and the synthetic oil plants at Boehlen, Leuna-Merseburg and Lützkendorf. This formation was intercepted by a German Gefechtsverband (combat formation) consisting of IV. Sturmgruppe of JG 3, led by Moritz, escorted by two Gruppen of Bf 109s from Jagdgeschwader 300 (JG 300—300th Fighter Wing) led by Major Walther Dahl. Dahl and Moritz drove the attack to point-blank range behind the Liberators of the 492d Bombardment Group before opening fire. 492d Bombardment Group was temporarily without fighter cover. Within about a minute the entire squadron of twelve B-24s had been annihilated. The Germans claimed 28 USAAF 2nd Air Division B-24 bombers that day and were credited with at least 21. The majority to the Sturmgruppe attack. This figure includes one B-24 bomber claimed shot down by Romm, taking his total to 77 aerial victories. In total, Luftwaffe pilots claimed the destruction of 60 bombers while actual losses were 28 bombers destroyed and further bombers returned with various levels of combat damage. The authors Prien, Stemmer and Bock state that the consolidated attack flown in close formation by the Sturmgruppe resulted in overclaiming of aerial victories caused by the confusing combat situation. During these attacks, multiple pilots may have simultaneously fired at the same bomber. It was therefore unclear who was responsible for the destruction of the bomber.

On 18 July, the USAAF Fifteenth Air Force attacked the Luftwaffe Memmingen Airfield. The Sturmgruppe intercepted the bombers and following the mission, the pilots claimed 36 heavy bombers shot down, including three Boeing B-17 Flying Fortress bombers by Romm. This took his total to 80 aerial victories. Two days later, the Sturmgruppe moved to an airfield at Schwaighofen near Neu-Ulm where they stayed until 30 July. The Sturmgruppe then moved to Schongau. There, 12. Sturmstaffel was renamed to 15. Sturmstaffel on 10 August.

In October 1944, Romm was transferred to I. Gruppe of JG 3 where he was tasked with the creation of a newly formed 4. Staffel. At the time, I. Gruppe was based at Bindersleben Airfield and commanded by Hauptmann Horst Haase. Command of 15. Sturmstaffel was then passed to Hauptmann Hubert-York Weydenhammer. Romm claimed his only aerial victory while serving with 4. Staffel on 2 November when he shot down a USAAF North American P-51 Mustang fighter. That day, the Eighth Air Force attacked the synthetic fuel factories at Leuna. The day ended with a defeat for the Luftwaffe with 72 pilots killed in action and further 32 pilots wounded. The USAAF lost 40 heavy bombers, further two crashed on their return to England, and 14 escort P-51 fighters shot down. In early December, Romm was transferred to I. Gruppe of Ergänzungs-Jagdgeschwader 1, a replacement training unit for fighter pilots. Command of 4. Staffel was then passed to Leutnant Franz Ruhl.

=== Eastern Front and end of war ===
On 12 January 1945, Soviet forces launched the Vistula–Oder offensive advancing into German-held territory, capturing Kraków, Warsaw and Poznań. In consequence, Romm as an experienced unit leader was transferred back to IV. Sturmgruppe of JG 3 again taking command of 15. Sturmstaffel. He took command from Leutnant Karl-Dieter Hecker who had taken command of the Sturmstaffel after Weydenhammer had been transferred in December 1944. On 21 January 1945, IV. Sturmgruppe was ordered to relocate from Gütersloh Airfield to Märkisch Friedland, present-day Mirosławiec, located approximately 75 kilometers (47 miles) east of Stargard. With this transfer, the Sturmgruppe came under the control of the 1. Flieger-Division, commanded by Generalmajor Robert Fuchs, and subordinated to II. Fliegerkorps (2nd Air Corps), headed by General der Flieger Martin Fiebig. On 27 January, Märkisch Friedland had to be abandoned and the Sturmgruppe retreated to an airfield 75 kilometers (47 miles) southwest of Stargard. Over the next weeks, the Sturmgruppe predominantly flew fighter-bomber missions in support of German ground forces retreating towards the Oder.

Reichsmarschall Hermann Göring, the commander-in-chief of the Luftwaffe, visited the Sturmgruppe on 13 February at Prenzlau. Göring was furious when he learned that the pilots were unable to fly missions due to lack of fuel. On 17 February 1945, Romm was appointed Gruppenkommandeur (group commander) of IV. Sturmgruppe of JG 3. He succeeded Major Erwin Bacsila who was transferred to Jagdgeschwader 400 (JG 400—400th Fighter Wing). Command of 15. Sturmstaffel was then passed to Leutnant Karl-Dieter Hecker. The next day, the Sturmgruppe flew ground support missions southeast of Stargard. During this mission, Luftwaffe pilots claimed four aerial victories, including an Il-2 ground-attack aircraft by Romm.

From 22 to 26 April during the Battle of the Oder–Neisse, the Sturmgruppe flew missions along the Oder in the sector of the 3rd Panzer Army. On 24 April, Romm's Fw 190 D-9 suffered engine failure during aerial combat with Il-2 ground-attack aircraft. Aborting the attack, crashed northeast of Prenzlau, near Brüssow. Severely injured, he was pulled from the wreck by the German infantry and picked up by members of the Sturmgruppe. The next day, he was evacuated to a hospital at Wismar and four days later to moved a hospital at Timmendorfer Strand. In consequence, command of the Sturmgruppe was passed on to Hauptmann Gerhard Koall. He had been nominated for the Knight's Cross of the Iron Cross with Oak Leaves (Ritterkreuz des Eisernen Kreuzes mit Eichenlaub) which was not approved before the war ended.

== Later life ==
Romm died on 1 May 1993 at the age of 73 in Waldesch, Germany.

== Summary of career ==
=== Aerial victory claims ===
According to US historian David T. Zabecki, Romm was credited with 92 aerial victories. Spick also lists Romm with 92 aerial victories, of which 82 were claimed over the Eastern Front and further 10 over the Western Front, claimed in 229 combat missions and a mission-to-claim ratio of 2.49. According to Obermaier, Romm flew 283 combat missions of which 54 were close air support missions. In addition, Aders and Held state that he was credited with eight four-engined heavy bombers destroyed. Mathews and Foreman, authors of Luftwaffe Aces — Biographies and Victory Claims, researched the German Federal Archives and found records for 88 aerial victory claims. This figure includes 78 aerial victories on the Eastern Front and 10 over the Western Allies, including eight four-engined heavy bombers, claimed in 283 combat missions.

Victory claims were logged to a map-reference (PQ = Planquadrat), for example "PQ 07651". The Luftwaffe grid map (Jägermeldenetz) covered all of Europe, western Russia and North Africa and was composed of rectangles measuring 15 minutes of latitude by 30 minutes of longitude, an area of about 360 square miles (930 km^{2}). These sectors were then subdivided into 36 smaller units to give a location area 3 km × 4 km (1.9 mi × 2.5 mi) in size.

Chronicle of aerial victories
This and the ♠ (Ace of spades) indicates those aerial victories which made Romm an "ace-in-a-day", a term which designates a fighter pilot who has shot down five or more airplanes in a single day. This and the ? (question mark) indicates information discrepancies listed by Prien, Stemmer, Rodeike, Balke, Bock, Mathews and Foreman.
Claim	Date	Time	Type	Location	Claim	Date	Time	Type	Location
– 1. Staffel of Jagdgeschwader 51 "Mölders" – Eastern Front — 11 September 1942 – 3 February 1943
1	4 December 1942	12:55	Il-2	vicinity of Oledar	3? (Note: This claim is not listed by Mathews and Foreman.)	18 January 1943	11:10	MiG-3	PQ 07754, Velikiye Luki
2	15 January 1943	12:45	MiG-3	PQ 07651					
– 1. Staffel of Jagdgeschwader 51 "Mölders" – Eastern Front — 4 February – September 1943
4	24 February 1943	09:46	Il-2	PQ 35 Ost 44282; 10 km (6.2 mi) north of Zhizdra	38♠	20 August 1943	05:40	Il-2 m.H. (Note: The "m.H." refers to an Ilyushin Il-2 with rear gunner (mit Heckschütze).)	southeast of Achtyrka
5	24 February 1943	09:48	Il-2	PQ 35 Ost 44252; 15 km (9.3 mi) north of Zhizdra	39♠	20 August 1943	05:41	Il-2 m.H.	southwest of Achtyrka
6	18 March 1943	07:11	Pe-2	PQ 35 Ost 53322; 10 km (6.2 mi) west of Soskovo	40♠	20 August 1943	05:43	Il-2 m.H.	southwest of Achtyrka
7	20 April 1943	12:15	La-5	PQ 35 Ost 64624; 20 km (12 mi) north-northeast of Mtsensk	41♠	20 August 1943	05:44	Il-2 m.H.	southwest of Achtyrka
8	10 June 1943	19:20	Il-2	PQ 35 Ost 44454 vicinity of Wosnessnokaja	42♠	20 August 1943	06:19	Il-2 m.H.	southwest of Achtyrka
9	5 July 1943	08:55	Il-2	PQ 35 Ost 73543; 40 km (25 mi) west-southwest of Livny	43♠	20 August 1943	06:21	Il-2 m.H.	southwest of Achtyrka
10	5 July 1943	11:50	MiG-3	PQ 35 Ost 63774; 10 km (6.2 mi) southeast of Fatezh	44	21 August 1943	14:19	Il-2 m.H.	east of Peressetschnaya
11	8 July 1943	03:57	Il-2	PQ 35 Ost 63713; 10 km (6.2 mi) east of Fatezh	45	22 August 1943	06:25	Il-2 m.H.	east of Peressetschnaja
12	8 July 1943	09:39	Il-2	PQ 35 Ost 63714; 10 km (6.2 mi) east of Fatezh	46	22 August 1943	07:00	Il-2 m.H.	south of Grjewka
13	9 July 1943	12:17	Il-2	PQ 35 Ost 63563; 10 km (6.2 mi) southwest of Maloarkhangelsk	47	23 August 1943	13:20	Il-2 m.H.	southeast of Tscherkasskoje
14	10 July 1943	13:27	La-5? (Note: According to Mathews and Foreman claimed as a Lavochkin-Gorbunov-Gudkov LaGG-3.)	PQ 35 Ost 63529; 20 km (12 mi) west-northwest of Maloarkhangelsk	48	23 August 1943	16:41	Pe-2	east of Ossnowa
15	11 July 1943	03:47	MiG-3	PQ 35 Ost 63587; 20 km (12 mi) southwest of Maloarkhangelsk	49	26 August 1943	17:12	Yak-1	PQ 35 Ost 41597; 30 km (19 mi) south of Lebedin
16	13 July 1943	13:43	Il-2	PQ 35 Ost 63242; 10 km (6.2 mi) south of Zalegoshch	50	26 August 1943	17:14	Yak-1	PQ 35 Ost 41586; 30 km (19 mi) south-southwest of Lebedin
17?	13 July 1943	—	Il-2		51	27 August 1943	13:00	MiG-3	Taranowka
18	13 July 1943	14:00	Il-2	PQ 35 Ost 63256; 15 km (9.3 mi) southeast of Zalegoshch	52	27 August 1943	13:07	Il-2 m.H.	Taranowka
19	21 July 1943	18:15	La-5	PQ 35 Ost 64811; 10 km (6.2 mi) south of Mtsensk	53	28 August 1943	11:55	La-5	Kotelura
20	23 July 1943	11:37	La-5	PQ 35 Ost 43243; 25 km (16 mi) west-southwest of Tschaikowka	54	31 August 1943	18:00	La-5	1 km (0.62 mi) west of Yelnya
21	1 August 1943	15:15	Il-2 m.H.	PQ 35 Ost 54766; 10 km (6.2 mi) south of Znamenskoye	55	31 August 1943	18:30	Pe-2	18 km (11 mi) east of Yelnya
22	1 August 1943	15:18	Il-2 m.H.	PQ 35 Ost 54764; 10 km (6.2 mi) south of Znamenskoye	56♠	4 September 1943	13:30	Il-2 m.H.	35 km (22 mi) southwest of Nowograditsche
23♠	2 August 1943	04:20	Il-2 m.H.	east of Sinojewo	57♠	4 September 1943	13:31	Il-2 m.H.	vicinity of Lenkino
24♠	2 August 1943	04:22	MiG-3	PQ 35 Ost 53622, Muchanowka; 15 km (9.3 mi) west of Trosna	58♠	4 September 1943	13:32	La-5	4 km (2.5 mi) south of Wederinki
25♠	2 August 1943	04:35	Pe-2	west of Ssemenowka; 15 km (9.3 mi) north-northeast of Dmitriyev-Lgovsky	59♠	4 September 1943	13:36	La-5	2 km (1.2 mi) south of Unbakowo
26♠	2 August 1943	04:36	Pe-2	PQ 35 53492; 15 km (9.3 mi) south-southeast of Kromy	60♠	4 September 1943	17:17	Pe-2	vicinity of Ssofonowo
27♠	2 August 1943	18:34	Il-2 m.H.	east of Karachev	61	5 September 1943	15:29	MiG-3	PQ 35 Ost 35379; 25 km (16 mi) southeast of Dorogobuzh
28	7 August 1943	08:20	MiG-3	PQ 35 Ost 54844; 20 km (12 mi) southeast of Znamenskoye	62	6 September 1943	09:35? (Note: According to Mathews and Foreman claimed at 09:30.)	Boston	8 km (5.0 mi) west Jaroslawez
29	7 August 1943	14:24	MiG-3? (Note: According to Mathews and Foreman claimed as a Ilyushin Il-2.)	PQ 35 Ost 54881; 10 km (6.2 mi) northeast of Naryschkino	63	6 September 1943	15:12	Pe-2	6 km (3.7 mi) northwest of Beredina; 1 km (0.62 mi) southwest of Voroshanka
30♠	14 August 1943	06:26	Il-2 m.H.	PQ 35 51858; 15 km (9.3 mi) east of Bohodukhiv	64	6 September 1943	15:24	Yak-7	6 km (3.7 mi) southwest of Goroshanka; 6 km (3.7 mi) northwest of Beredina Luika
31♠	14 August 1943	06:27	Il-2 m.H.	PQ 35 Ost 51825; 15 km (9.3 mi) southwest of Zolochiv	65	7 September 1943	16:12	Yak-4? (Note: According to Mathews and Foreman claimed as a Yakovlev Yak-7.)	1 km (0.62 mi) east of Wilarowka
32♠	14 August 1943	11:20	Boston	Stalina	66	8 September 1943	07:39? (Note: According to Mathews and Foreman claimed at 07:38.)	Yak-7	5 km (3.1 mi) northeast of Rudnja
33♠	14 August 1943	13:22	La-5	north of Krysino	67	8 September 1943	07:47	Yak-7	5 km (3.1 mi) south of Kirov
34♠	14 August 1943	16:50? (Note: According to Mathews and Foreman claimed at 10:50.)	P-40	PQ 35 Ost 51179; 10 km (6.2 mi) west of Spas-Demensk	68	9 September 1943	15:30	MiG-3	6 km (3.7 mi) northeast of Dukhovshchina
35	18 August 1943	06:48	Yak-1	east of Kotlyarov	69?	10 September 1943	16:46	Yak-1	Djatkowo
36	18 August 1943	07:24	Il-2 m.H.	east of Bezlyudovka	70?	14 September 1943	16:30	La-5	Schatkowa
37	18 August 1943	07:25	Il-2 m.H.	east of Bezlyudovka					
– 1. Staffel of Jagdgeschwader 51 "Mölders" – Eastern Front — February 1944
71♠	5 February 1944	08:58	Yak-9	PQ 25 Ost N/93329; 15 km (9.3 mi) southwest of Parichi	74♠	5 February 1944	Boston? (Note: According to Mathews and Foreman claimed as a Bell P-39 Airacobra.)	Boston	PQ 25 Ost N/93345; 15 km (9.3 mi) southwest of Parichi
72♠	5 February 1944	09:00	Boston?	PQ 25 Ost N/93351; 20 km (12 mi) southwest of Parichi	75♠	5 February 1944	09:03	Boston	PQ 25 Ost N/93474; 30 km (19 mi) south-southeast of Parichi
73♠	5 February 1944	09:01	Boston?	PQ 25 Ost N/93324; 15 km (9.3 mi) southwest of Parichi	76♠	5 February 1944	Boston?	Boston	PQ 25 Ost N/93428; 30 km (19 mi) south-southeast of Parichi
– 2. Staffel of Jagdgeschwader 51 "Mölders" – Defense of the Reich — July 1944
77	7 July 1944	09:40	B-24	PQ 15 Ost S/HC, Oschersleben					
– 12. Sturmstaffel of Jagdgeschwader 3 "Udet" – Defense of the Reich — 7 July – 10 August 1944
78	18 July 1944	10:50	B-17	30 km (19 mi) southeast of Memmingen	80	18 July 1944	10:55	B-17? (Note: According to Mathews and Foreman claimed as a North American P-51 Mustang.)	40 km (25 mi) southeast of Memmingen
79	18 July 1944	10:50	B-17	30 km (19 mi) southeast of Memmingen					
– 15. Sturmstaffel of Jagdgeschwader 3 "Udet" – Defense of the Reich — 10 August – November 1944
81	27 September 1944	11:06	B-24	PQ 15 Ost S/MA - 05 Ost MU; Eschwege	84	28 September 1944	12:50	B-17	PQ 15 Ost S/JB west of Halberstadt
82	27 September 1944	11:06	B-24	PQ 15 Ost S/MA - 05 Ost MU; Eschwege area	85	28 September 1944	12:51	B-17	PQ 15 Ost S/JB west of Halberstadt
83	27 September 1944	11:07	B-24	PQ 15 Ost S/MA - 05 Ost MU; Eschwege area					
– 4. Staffel of Jagdgeschwader 3 "Udet" – Defense of the Reich — November 1944
86	2 November 1944	12:38	P-51	PQ 15 Ost KD					
– Stab IV. Gruppe of Jagdgeschwader 3 "Udet" – Defense of the Reich in the East — 17 February – 8 May 1945
87	18 February 1945	—	Il-2		90	3 March 1945	17:10	P-39	
88	19 February 1945	—	P-39		91	6 March 1945	—	LaGG-3	
89	19 February 1945	—	Yak-3		92	21 March 1945	—	Il-2	

=== Awards ===
- Iron Cross (1939) 2nd and 1st Class
- Honor Goblet of the Luftwaffe on 1 November 1943 as Feldwebel and pilot (Note: According to Obermaier on 2 October 1943.)
- German Cross in Gold on 17 October 1943 as Feldwebel in the I./Jagdgeschwader 51
- Knight's Cross of the Iron Cross on 29 February 1944 as Oberfeldwebel and pilot in the 1./Jagdgeschwader 51 "Mölders" (Note: According to Scherzer as pilot in the I./Jagdgeschwader 51 "Mölders".)

== Notes ==
Military offices
Preceded by Major Erwin Bacsila	Commander of IV. Gruppe of Jagdgeschwader 3 "Udet"; 17 February 1945 – 25 April 1945	Succeeded by Hauptmann Gerhard Koall
