= Klara Griefahn =

Jewish doctor (1897–1945)

- Born: Klara Hoffmann; 19 September 1897; Budapest, Austria-Hungary
- Died: 30 January 1945 (aged 47); Jena, Nazi Germany

Klara Griefahn (19 September 1897 – 30 January 1945) was a Jewish medical doctor who committed suicide in 1945 to avoid deportation by the Nazis. A number of memorials to Greifahn can be found in Jena, Germany.

== Life and work ==
Klara Griefahn, eighth daughter to a family of Jewish wine sellers, completed her “Matura” (High-school) studies in 1916 in Budapest and went on to study medicine. In 1917 she moved to Greifswald in Germany and continued her studies there. In Germany, she did not register as a Jew but only as a Hungarian, and went on to study to become a physician in Germany. In Greifswald she met her later husband Siegfried Griefahn. They married in 1920 in Budapest.

In 1922 the family moved to Lobeda, a small village next to the city of Jena, Germany. Klara's husband opened his own medical practice in Jena (first in Markt 3, then between 1924 and 1939 in Diakonatsgasse 5, and finally in Schulstr. 13). Griefahn completed her studies in Jena and received her license on 3 November 1923. She joined her husband's practice, focusing on postpartum recovery and infant care. She was the first to introduce free counselling for young mothers in Jena. Her patients treasured her motherly devotion. In 1924 Klara gave birth to her son Sigurd and in 1928 to her daughter Dörte.

In 1931 she opened her own general practice in Goethestr. 6 in Jena. However, by July 1933 she decided to close down her practice to avoid being classified as a “non-Aryan” doctor, as she was classified as a “2nd degree Mischling” at the time. She went back to work in her husbands’ practice.

In 1943 Griefahn's Jewish origins were discovered, following numerous interrogations by the Gestapo. She was denounced by a close friend and eventually admitted to being a Jew.

Her license to practice medicine was revoked and she was forced to take an additional “Jewish” name, Sara. Her children were classified as "1st degree Mischling", her daughter was expelled from the Lyzium (high-school) and her son was dismissed from the German Air Force. All these misfortunes led her to attempt suicide in 1943, however she was saved. Throughout this ordeal her husband remained faithful and refused to divorce her, thus helping her avoid deeper sanctions. He was protected also by his loyal German patients.

Griefahn lived the rest of her life in fear of deportation to a concentration camp. Many of her patients and neighbors in Lobeda remained loyal to her, and even helped her (sometimes illegally). However, her psychological state only worsened.

On 29 January 1945 Klara Griefahn received the deportation order to Terezin (a Czech concentration camp). She took her life in the night between 30 and 31 January 1945 by taking an overdose of morphine.

In her suicide note she wrote "Better dead than a slave" ("lieber Tot als Sklav"). This suicide shook the citizens of Lobeda very much and during the funeral the cemetery is said to have been full of people. All the Jews deported from Jena on that last deportation train survived the war and returned to Jena.

== Tributes ==
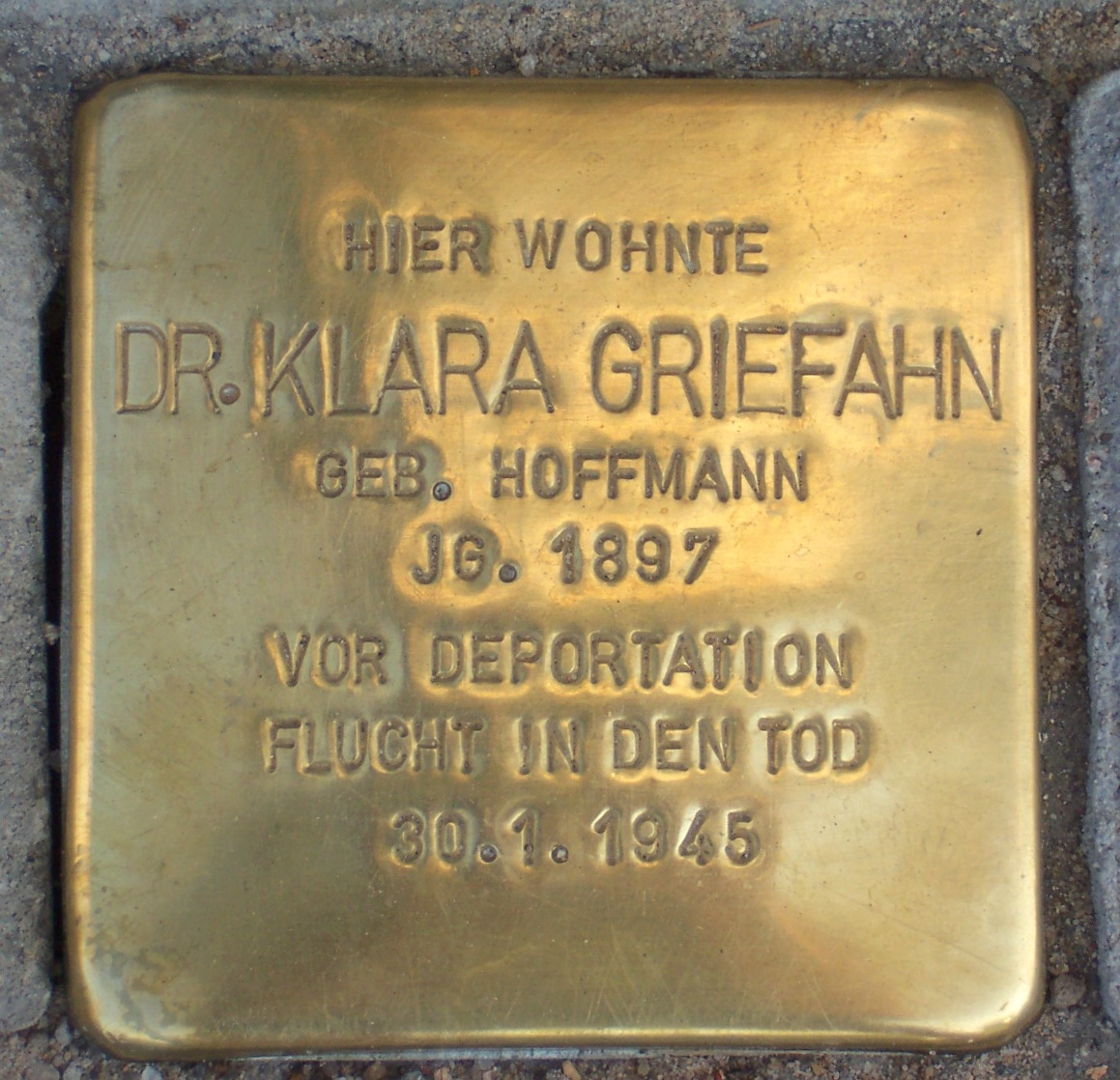
Stumbling stone for Griefahn

Klara Greifahn's has been commemorated in Jena in many ways over the years:

- 12 November 1945, the street where she had lived (Schulstraße), was renamed Klara-Griefahn-Straße.
- 19 November 2002, Ward 3 of the Jena Women's Hospital was named after Klara Griefahn.
- 12 November 2005, exactly 60 years after the renaming of Schulstraße, an information plaque on was placed next to the street sign.
- On 17 August 2009, a "stumbling stone" (Stolperstein) was set in front of her former residence.
- Every year, since 2009, a small ceremony is held next to her residence on 9 November.
- On 25 March 2015, Jena's City Council unanimously included her grave in Lobeda in the city's charter of honorary graves.
