= Mischlinge in the Wehrmacht =

Military personnel in Nazi Germany not considered "Aryan"

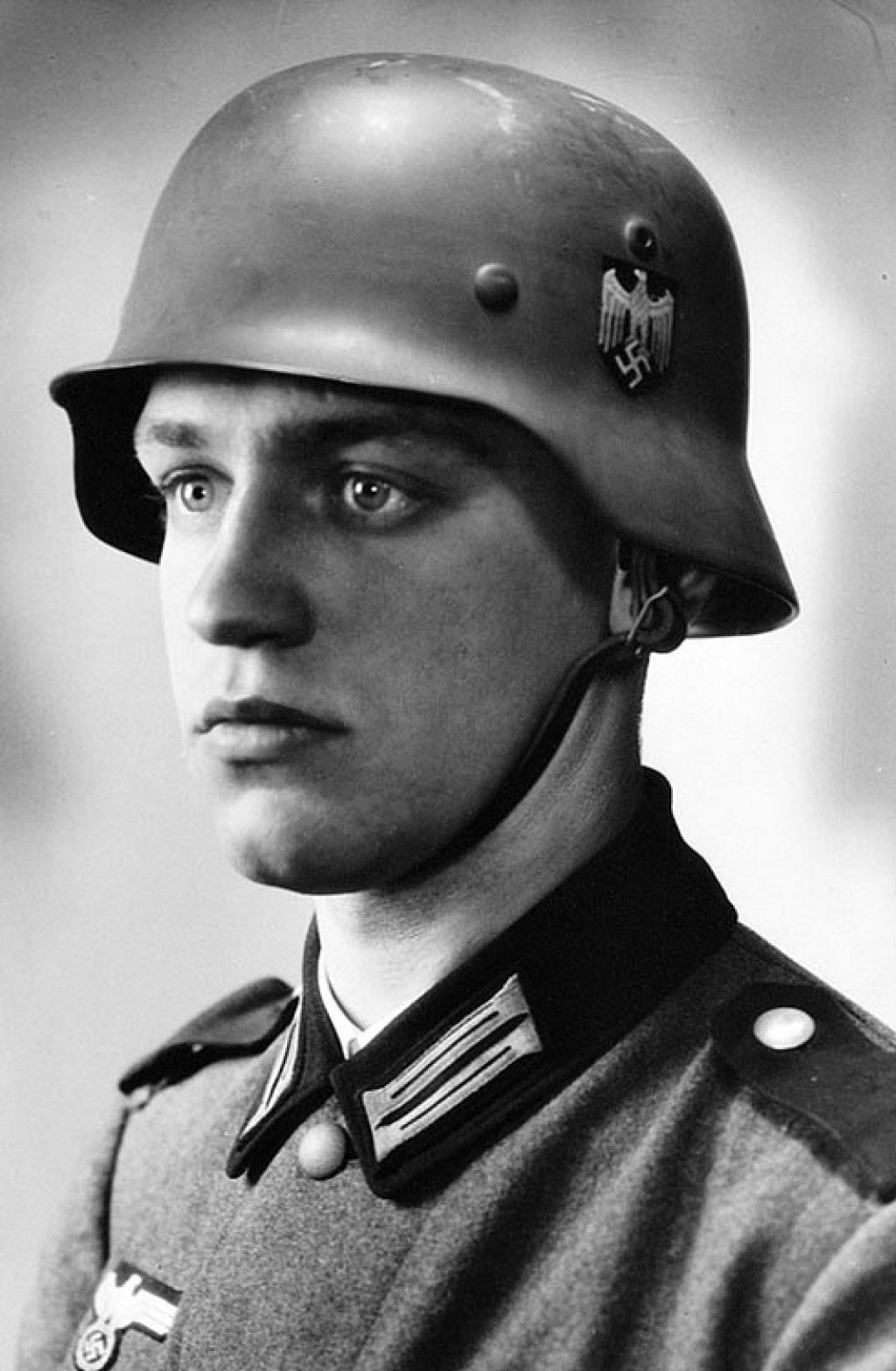
Werner Goldberg—the baptized son of a Jewish father and a German mother, and one of the best-known rank-and-file soldiers of the Wehrmacht

Mischlinge in the Wehrmacht were military personnel of mixed ancestry who were not considered fully "Aryan" and held a special status under Nazi racial legislation. Most were of mixed German and Jewish ancestry, being one-half or one-quarter Jewish ("first-degree" and "second-degree Mischlinge", respectively).

Between 80 and 90% of "non-Aryan Mischlinge" were Christians. Fewer than 10% of first-degree Mischlinge and only 1.2% of second-degree Mischlinge identified as Jewish. The rest considered themselves German; many were members of the Nazi Party and even antisemites.

Policy toward Mischlinge was contradictory and inconsistent. Before the Nuremberg Laws were enacted, almost all of them had been discharged from the military. They were subsequently declared eligible for military service, subject to significant restrictions. Beginning in April 1940, first-degree Mischlinge began to be discharged. From 1942, individual exemptions previously granted to them were revoked. Second-degree Mischlinge, as well as first-degree Mischlinge who managed to conceal their ancestry, continued to serve until the end of the war.

A similar policy was applied to Roma. After all Jewish Mischlinge were discharged from the military, they were assigned to forced labor with the Organisation Todt in 1944, while many Romani Mischlinge were deported to Auschwitz.

Dark-skinned descendants of German women and colonial soldiers serving in the French forces during the Occupation of the Rhineland were also considered Mischlinge. They were forcibly sterilized in 1937, but were later conscripted into the military.

== Definition and status ==
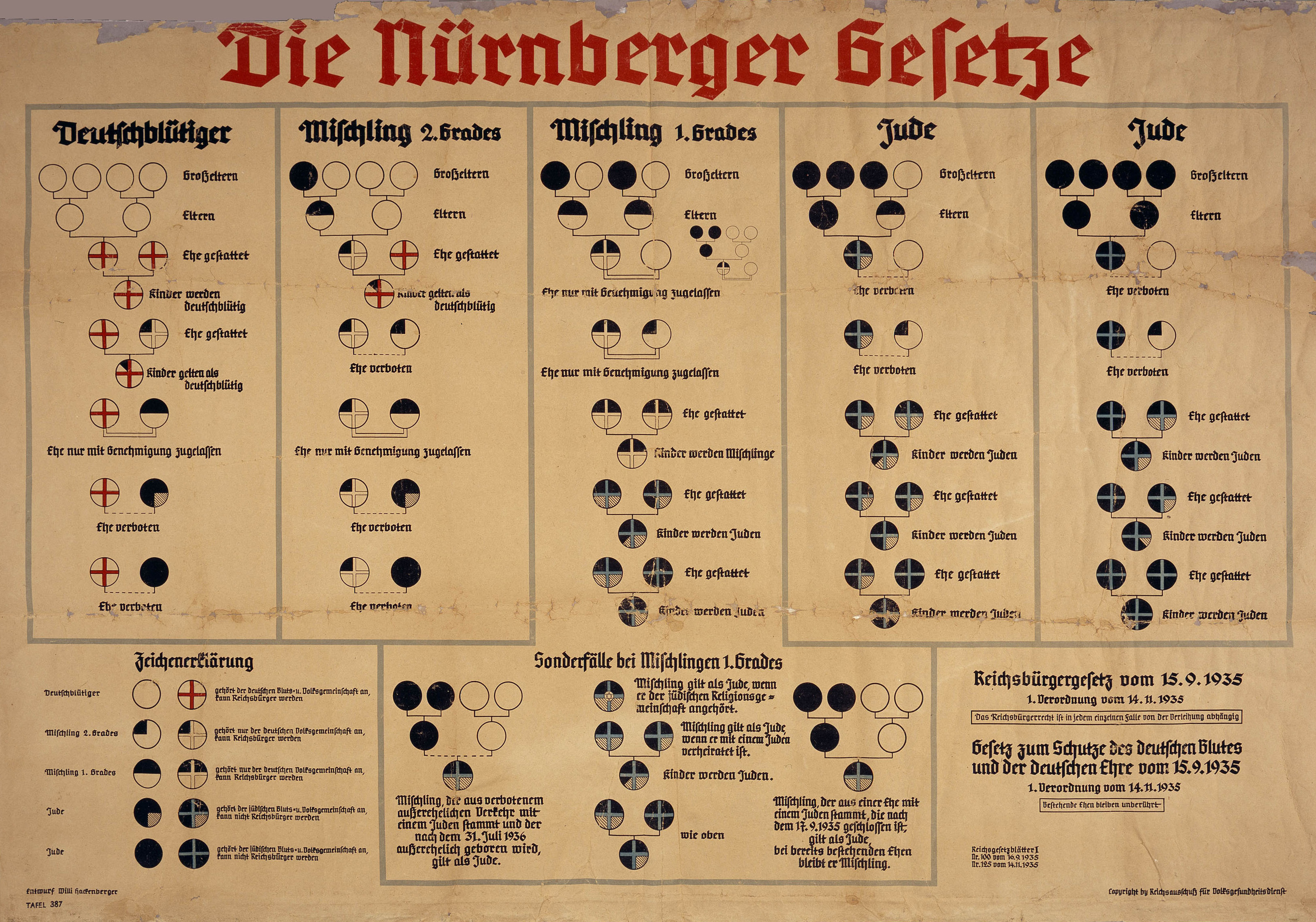
Nazi racial classification chart illustrating the categories established under the Nuremberg Laws, including first- and second-degree Mischlinge

After the Nazi seizure of power in Germany in 1933, the Nazi regime faced the question of how to translate its racist and antisemitic ideology into practical policy; one of the most difficult issues was defining who was to be considered a Jew.

Under the racial doctrine adopted by the Nazis, people who had ancestors of both "Aryan" and "non-Aryan" (particularly Jewish) origin were assigned a special status and referred to as Mischlinge ("mixed-bloods"). Jewish Mischlinge had a different status from other Mischlinge and were officially designated "Jewish Mischlinge" (Jüdische Mischlinge). Their treatment varied considerably depending on time and place. The special status of Mischlinge applied primarily to German citizens; in the occupied territories, Mischlinge were often equated with Jews.

The distinctions between the various categories of "non-Aryans" were defined most precisely in the Nuremberg Laws, enacted in November 1935. With some exceptions, people with two Jewish grandparents were classified as first-degree Mischlinge, while those with one Jewish grandparent were classified as second-degree Mischlinge. Between 80 and 90% of those classified as "non-Aryan Mischlinge" were Christians, while fewer than 7% reported their religion as Judaism.

A similar classification was introduced for Roma (Zigeunermischlinge). The same status was also applied to the "Rhineland bastards", descendants of German women and colonial soldiers serving in the French occupation forces in the Rhineland. Nazi legal scholars described Black Germans as a paradigmatic example of people with "foreign blood". Pursuant to Hitler's order of 18 April 1937, Black Mischlinge were subjected to mass compulsory sterilization.

The First Regulation to the Reich Citizenship Law allowed exceptions to the rules governing the classification of "non-Aryans", but the authority to grant such individual exemptions was reserved personally to Adolf Hitler. Before an application could reach Hitler, however, it had to undergo preliminary review for special justification by the head of the relevant administrative district and by the Ministry of the Interior.

According to the census of 17 May 1939, the German Reich—in its borders as of 1 January 1938, excluding Ostmark, the Sudeten German territories, and the Memel Territory—contained approximately 64,000 "half-Jews" (Halbjuden) and either 42,811 or 41,456 "quarter-Jews" (Vierteljuden).

Australian historian Steven Welch noted that, "by inventing the category of Mischling, by fabricating in effect a new 'racial' group where in fact none existed, the Nazis forced into existence a new 'community of fate' which encompassed an otherwise widely diverse group of individuals who in nearly all respects were indistinguishable from the rest of the German population." Their designation as a separate group served as a basis for discrimination and persecution by the Nazi state. Nazi policy toward Mischlinge was often inconsistent.

== Service in the Wehrmacht ==
=== Before the war ===
Werner von Blomberg, who in 1934 ordered the application of the "Aryan paragraph" to military personnel

Most Jews had already been discharged from the German military in 1933. From 31 May 1935, Jews were officially barred from serving in the Wehrmacht.

Policy on the military service of Mischlinge was marked by the same inconsistencies and contradictions as their status more generally. The Nazi leadership engaged in a long-running debate over whether Mischlinge should be permitted to serve in the military. The Wehrmacht leadership was interested in drawing on Mischlinge as a source of recruits, while Reich Minister of Defence (later Reich Minister of War) Werner von Blomberg sought to introduce the racial and political principles of the Nazi Party into the military. On 28 February 1934, he ordered that the Law for the Restoration of the Professional Civil Service be applied to military personnel. Under the law, all men whose ancestry records listed at least one Jewish grandparent were discharged from the military. The military conscription ordinance of 29 May 1935 stated:

Aryan descent is a prerequisite for active military service. A person is to be regarded as non-Aryan who is descended from non-Aryans, especially Jewish parents or grandparents. This holds true even if only one parent or grandparent is of non-Aryan descent.

Within a few weeks, a more moderate position, supported by the Interior Ministry, prevailed. Under the ordinance of 25 July 1935, Mischlinge began to be conscripted into military service. By Hitler's decision, Mischlinge were permitted to serve in the military, but not in command positions, although commanders could recommend them for military decorations. In 1935, there were approximately 45,000 first-degree Mischlinge in Germany who were fit for military service. After the adoption of the Nuremberg Laws, military regulations were brought into line with them. The revised conscription law of June 1936 distinguished between Jews and Mischlinge. It stated that "A Jew cannot carry out active military service", while Mischlinge, by contrast, were required to serve.

In Germany, there was a longstanding stereotype that Roma engaged in espionage. On 26 November 1937, the Reich Minister of War issued a decree declaring "full-blooded Gypsies" and persons regarded as showing an evident influence of "Gypsy blood" ("Gypsy Mischlinge") unfit for active military service. The decree, however, was poorly enforced.

=== During the war ===
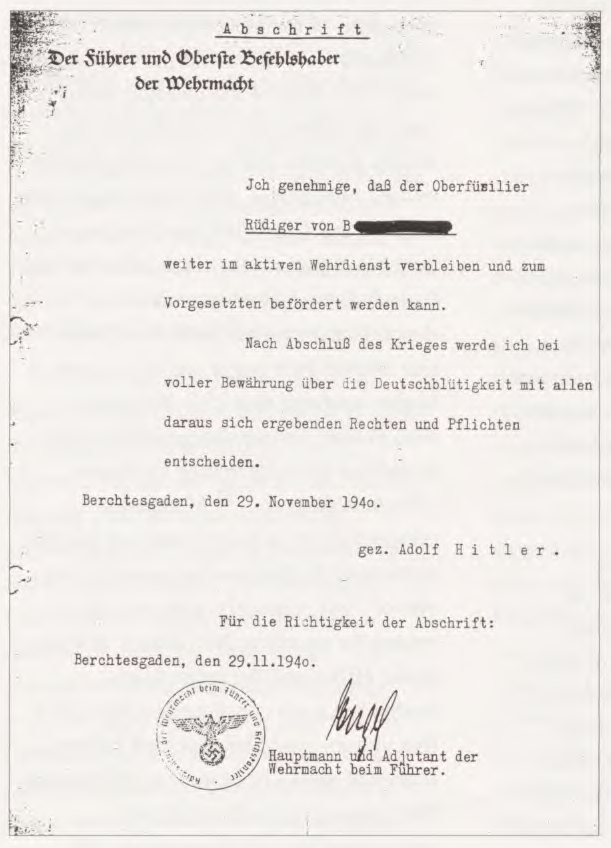
Authorization allowing a soldier of mixed German-Jewish ancestry to continue serving in the Wehrmacht

In early 1939, racial pressure on military personnel intensified. Soldiers and civilian military employees whose wives were Jewish were dismissed. In January 1940, Hitler ordered lists to be compiled of all first- and second-degree Mischlinge serving in the Wehrmacht. On 8 April 1940, on the eve of the occupation of Denmark and invasion of Norway, Hitler approved the general dismissal of first-degree Mischlinge and persons "related to Jews by family ties". Some could remain in the military with special permission granted personally by Hitler, for example if they had demonstrated military bravery and received decorations. Hitler could also declare particularly distinguished soldiers to be "of German blood" and even permit their promotion to officer rank, for example in cases of severe wounds or death in combat. Second-degree Mischlinge serving in the ranks, as well as men married to them, remained in the military. In exceptional cases, they could be promoted and placed in positions of command. Nevertheless, they were often subjected to ostracism and became the targets of numerous denunciations.

In practice, large-scale dismissals began after the end of the campaign in France. Responding to the large number of applications for permission to remain in service, the Wehrmacht leadership stated that the selection of candidates and preparation of petitions "required a special understanding for the significance of the principles of racial law". Such permission was to be granted only in exceptional cases, and even decoration with the Iron Cross was not considered sufficient grounds. Nevertheless, the lower echelons of the military were lax in enforcing the order, while Mischlinge themselves also sought to remain in service. According to Welch, despite the dismissal order, several thousand "half-Jews" remained in the Wehrmacht.

In February 1941, the Armed Forces High Command ordered the discharge of those classified as Roma or "Romani Mischlinge". They were also no longer to receive military decorations and were no longer subject to conscription. Their military registration cards were to be marked "Z" (from Zigeuner, "Gypsy") or "ZM" (from Zigeunermischling, "Gypsy Mischling"). Some continued to serve until their ancestry had been established, and commanders petitioned on behalf of individual servicemen. On 10 July 1942, the Armed Forces High Command clarified that Roma, like Jews, were to be discharged permanently, while Romani Mischlinge were to be transferred to "Reserve II" (classified as "unfit for service"). Similar decrees concerning service in air defence and the Reich Labour Service were issued later that year. In September 1943, this policy was slightly relaxed. Many of those discharged from military service were subsequently deported to Auschwitz.

After a limited relaxation of policy toward Jewish Mischlinge on the eve of Germany's invasion of the Soviet Union, their treatment became markedly harsher from the summer of 1942. On 1 July 1942, Hitler stated, "our people does itself damage when it allows Mischlinge to serve in the military and thereby opens up for them the possibilities for equalisation with those of German blood". Martin Bormann instructed the Wehrmacht to apply the strictest criteria in assessing them. Petitions for exemptions for first-degree Mischlinge were rejected by an order of the Armed Forces High Command of 25 September 1942, and on 12 October 1942 Hitler prohibited any further applications on the matter. However, those killed in action could still be posthumously recognized as "of German blood", and Hitler also withdrew his objections to the laying of wreaths at their funerals. Nevertheless, petitions continued to be submitted and processed, although the approval rate fell almost to zero: between 30 June 1942 and 30 September 1943, only 30 of 1,427 petitions were approved. At the same time, amid growing wartime manpower shortages, many commanders were extremely reluctant to carry out the order to discharge Mischlinge, particularly those who had proven themselves to be good soldiers.

Those Jewish Mischlinge who had been discharged from the military returned to civilian life. Because they were outwardly indistinguishable from other Germans, the presence of healthy young men of military age on the home front often prompted attacks on them as shirkers avoiding front-line service. According to official figures, 8,330 men had been discharged from military service by the beginning of 1943. In the autumn of 1943, Hermann Göring ordered the compulsory assignment of Mischlinge and persons "related to Jews by family ties" to labour service with the Organisation Todt. In March 1944, Fritz Sauckel began implementing this plan. Historian Beate Meyer notes that service with the Organisation Todt was the only factor that brought Mischlinge together as a real group before the end of the war, albeit on a very limited scale.

In late 1944, the Army Personnel Office issued a new directive ordering the discharge of all "half-Jewish" officers and officers married to "half-Jewish" women, including those who had officially been declared "of German blood" or had received special permission from Hitler to remain on active military service. On 28 November 1944, the Armed Forces High Command, at the request of the Security Police, ordered the discharge of all remaining "half-Jews" from the military. Local authorities were to be notified in advance so that the "half-Jews" could "be picked up without delay" by the Gestapo. Second-degree Mischlinge, as well as first-degree Mischlinge who managed to conceal their ancestry, continued to serve in the Wehrmacht until the end of Nazi Germany.

=== After the war ===
Following the end of the war, many Mischlinge and others who had been persecuted on racial grounds under the Nazi regime began forming organizations as early as May 1945 to address pressing issues concerning employment, marriage and family, pensions, and compensation for the suffering they had endured. Beate Meyer describes a case in which exclusion from military service beginning in 1934 was recognized as grounds for compensation. The former serviceman was retroactively promoted to the rank of major, as he would have reached that rank by the time Mischlinge were discharged from the Wehrmacht in 1940. However, the dismissal of Mischlinge already serving in the Wehrmacht on the same racial grounds was not considered grounds for compensation.

== Most notable cases ==
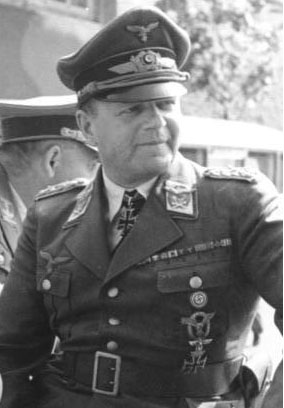
The highest-ranking Mischling, Generalfeldmarschall Erhard Milch

The highest-ranking Mischling in the German military was Generalfeldmarschall Erhard Milch, Hermann Göring's deputy and inspector general of the Luftwaffe. His mother was German and his father was Jewish. To resolve the problem posed by his ancestry, records were made to state that his "actual" father was his mother's lover. According to different accounts, the man named as his father in the documents was Baron Hermann von Bier or his mother's uncle Karl Brauer.

The best-known rank-and-file soldier in the Wehrmacht was Werner Goldberg, whose photograph, captioned "The Ideal German Soldier", was published in the Berliner Tageblatt and later used to recruit volunteers. In 1940, it was discovered that Goldberg's father was Jewish, after which he was discharged from the Wehrmacht in disgrace.

A lesser-known case is that of Hans Hauck, the son of a German woman and an Algerian man who served in the French occupation forces in the Rhineland after World War I. Hauck was regarded as one of the so-called "Rhineland bastards". He was a member of the Hitler Youth from the ages of 13 to 15 and was forcibly sterilized by the Nazis in 1937. In 1942, he was conscripted into the German military, served on the Eastern Front, and was held as a prisoner of war in the Soviet Union from 1945 to 1949.

A number of accounts have also been published describing the individual fates of Romani Mischlinge who were conscripted into the Wehrmacht and later discharged on racial grounds. Ludwig Becker, for example, had been awarded the Medal commemorating 1 October 1938, but was discharged from the Wehrmacht on 8 January 1943; exactly two months later, on 8 March, he and his family were deported from Biedenkopf to Auschwitz. Gerhard Rudolf Deusing of Leipzig met a similar fate.

== Hitler's Jewish Soldiers ==
In 2002, American historian Bryan Mark Rigg published Hitler's Jewish Soldiers. Based on more than 400 interviews with former servicemen and demographic calculations, Rigg concluded that approximately 150,000 people of German-Jewish descent had served in the Wehrmacht. Most of the book describes the history of the contradictory racial policies applied to such people in Nazi Germany and the complex process for obtaining exemptions. Scholars strongly criticized Rigg's book, particularly its title and its greatly inflated estimate of the number of Mischlinge.

British historian Richard J. Evans and Rigg's doctoral supervisor Jonathan Steinberg both argued that the book's title was misleading. American historian Omer Bartov stated that to call these men "Jewish" "is to become complicit in the Nazis' own racist doctrines". Historian David Fine, while noting the problem with the book's title, pointed out that Rigg relied on Jeremy Noakes's 1989 essay. Noakes wrote that fewer than 10% of first-degree Mischlinge and only 1.2% of second-degree Mischlinge considered themselves Jewish; the rest considered themselves German, and many were members of the Nazi Party and even antisemites.

Historian Beate Meyer of the Institute for the History of the German Jews in Hamburg described Hitler's Jewish Soldiers as a sham and characterized the figure of 150,000 Mischlinge who had served as unrealistic and based on flawed calculations. According to University of Vermont professor Raul Hilberg, author of the first major study of the Holocaust, The Destruction of the European Jews, the fact that thousands of Mischlinge had served in the Wehrmacht was "not a bombshell", while the claim that there had been more than 100,000 of them was "preposterous".

== In film ==
In 2004, German filmmaker Heike Mundzeck made the documentary Soldiers with Half a Star – As "Jewish Mischlinge" in the Wehrmacht (Die Soldaten mit dem halben Stern – Als „jüdische Mischlinge“ in der Wehrmacht). Based on interviews with surviving servicemen who had been classified by the Nazis as first- or second-degree Mischlinge, the film examines their motives for serving in the Wehrmacht, including military tradition and the hope of protecting relatives from persecution. In 2006, Larry Price made the documentary Hitler's Jewish Soldiers, which was inspired by Rigg's book of the same name, and focused on people of Jewish ancestry who had served in the Wehrmacht.

Other documentaries have also focused on the lives of individual Mischlinge in the Wehrmacht. Larry Price's The Chabad Rebbe and the German Officer (2011) focuses on Ernst Bloch, a major in the Abwehr and the son of a Jewish father and a German mother, who in 1939 led the rescue from occupied Poland of the sixth Lubavitcher Rebbe, Yosef Yitzchak Schneersohn. The 2016 film Don't Tell Anyone! (Erzähl es niemandem!), directed by Klaus Martens, tells the story of Wehrmacht soldier Helmut Krott, whose mother was Jewish. While serving in occupied Norway, he concealed his ancestry, and his military uniform protected him from persecution.

== Bibliography ==
- Absolon, Rudolf (1988). Die Wehrmacht im Dritten Reich – 1. September 1939 bis 18. Dezember 1941. Schriften des Bundesarchivs, Band 16 V (in German). Vol. 5. Boppard am Rhein: Harald Boldt Verlag. pp. 148–150.
- Campt, Tina (2005). Other Germans: Black Germans and the Politics of Race, Gender, and Memory in the Third Reich. Social History, Popular Culture, and Politics in Germany. Ann Arbor: University of Michigan Press. doi:10.3998/mpub.17684. ISBN 978-0-472-03138-2.
- Fine, David J. (July 2004). "Review of Rigg, Bryan Mark, Hitler's Jewish Soldiers: The Untold Story of Nazi Racial Laws and Men of Jewish Descent in the German Military". H-German, H-Net Reviews.
- Kaplan, Philip (2008). Fighter Aces of the RAF in the Battle of Britain. Barnsley: Pen & Sword Aviation. ISBN 978-1-84415-587-3.
- Meyer, Beate (2015). „Jüdische Mischlinge“. Rassenpolitik und Verfolgungserfahrung 1933–1945 (PDF) (in German) (4th ed.). Dölling und Galitz Verlag. ISBN 978-3-933374-22-6.
- Meyer, Beate (6 November 2003). "Wenn Spekulationen zu Tatsachen werden". Die Zeit (in German). No. 46. p. 49. Archived from the original on 9 November 2022.
- Mitcham, Samuel W. Jr.; Mueller, Gene (2012). Hitler's Commanders: Officers of the Wehrmacht, the Luftwaffe, the Kriegsmarine, and the Waffen-SS (2nd ed.). Bloomsbury Publishing PLC. ISBN 978-1-4422-1154-4.
- Noakes, Jeremy (1989). "The Development of Nazi Policy towards the German-Jewish "Mischlinge" 1933–1945". The Leo Baeck Institute Year Book. 34 (1): 291–354. doi:10.1093/leobaeck/34.1.291.
- Roos, Julia (18 March 2022). "Die "farbigen Besatzungskinder" der zwei Weltkriege". Bundeszentrale für politische Bildung (in German).
- Ross, Nadine I. (2023). "Bodies and Spaces: Citizenship as Claims-Making in Germany, 1942–1949". Central European History. 56 (3): 436–454. doi:10.1017/S000893892200173X.
- Röhm, Eberhard; Thierfelder, Jörg (1992). Juden, Christen, Deutsche 1933–1945 (in German). Vol. 2: 1935 bis 1938, Teil 1. Stuttgart: Calwer Verlag. ISBN 3-7668-3022-8.
- Röhm, Eberhard; Thierfelder, Jörg (1995). Juden, Christen, Deutsche 1933–1945 (in German). Vol. 3: 1938–1941, Teil 2. Stuttgart: Calwer Verlag. ISBN 978-3-7668-3934-3.
- Spannenberger, Marcel (2022). Das Führungspersonal der Landratsämter Marburg und Biedenkopf in der NS-Zeit. Eine wissenschaftliche Studie im Auftrag des Landkreises Marburg-Biedenkopf (PDF) (Report) (in German). Marburg. pp. 134–135.
- Steiner, John M.; Cornberg, Jobst Freiherr von (1998). "Willkür in der Willkür. Befreiungen von den antisemitischen Nürnberger Gesetzen" (PDF). Vierteljahrshefte für Zeitgeschichte (in German). 46 (2): 143–187.
- Welch, Steven R. (1999). "Mischling Deserters from the Wehrmacht". The Leo Baeck Institute Year Book. 44 (1): 273–324. doi:10.1093/leobaeck/44.1.273.
- Wermes, Kristina (2016). "Das Schicksal der Leipziger Sintifamilie Deußing" (PDF). In Krahl, Kathrin; Meichsner, Antje (eds.). Viele Kämpfe und vielleicht einige Siege. Texte über Antiromaismus und historische Lokalrecherchen zu und von Roma, Romnja, Sinti und Sintezze in Sachsen, Sachsen-Anhalt und Tschechien (in German). Weiterdenken – Heinrich-Böll-Stiftung Sachsen. pp. 72–75.
- Wietog, Jutta (2001). Fischer, Wolfram (ed.). Volkszählungen unter dem Nationalsozialismus: Eine Dokumentation zur Bevölkerungsstatistik im Dritten Reich. Schriften zur Wirtschafts- und Sozialgeschichte (in German). Vol. 66. Berlin: Duncker & Humblot. ISBN 978-3-428-10384-3. ISSN 0582-0588.
- Zimmermann, Michael (1996). Rassenutopie und Genozid: Die nationalsozialistische „Lösung der Zigeunerfrage“ (PDF). Hamburger Beiträge zur Sozial- und Zeitgeschichte (in German). Vol. 33. Hamburg: Christians. ISBN 3-7672-1270-6.
