= Werner Goldberg =

German Wehrmacht soldier and politician (1919–2004)

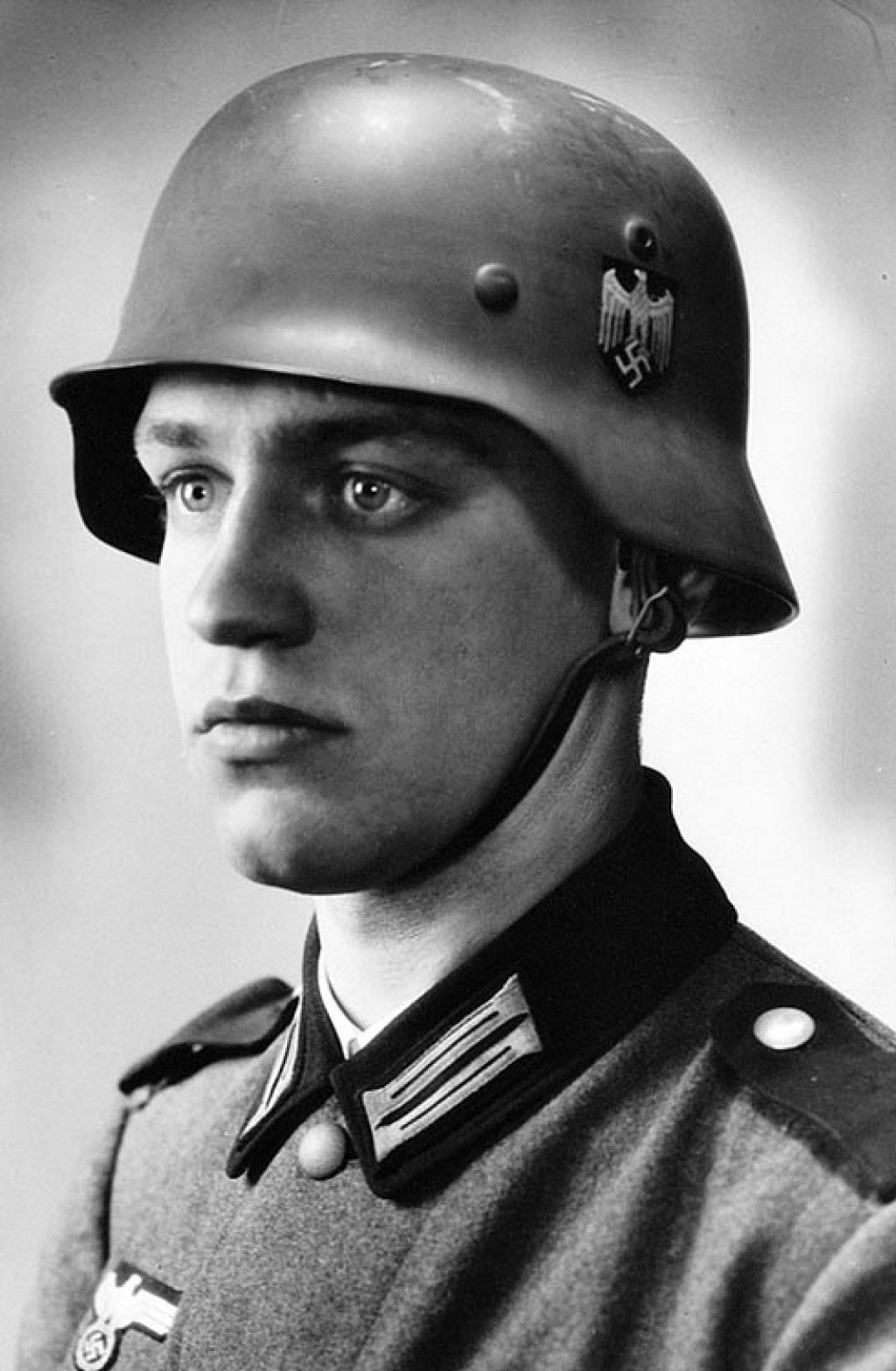
- Werner Goldberg
- Born: 3 October 1919; Berlin, Germany
- Died: 28 September 2004 (aged 84); Berlin, Germany
- Burial place: Wilmersdorf, Berlin, Germany
- Children: 3
- Military career
- Allegiance: Nazi Germany
- Branch: Wehrmacht
- Service years: December 1938–April 1940
- Rank: Schütze (Rifleman)
- Conflicts: World War II; Invasion of Poland

Werner Goldberg (3 October 1919 – 28 September 2004) was a German of half Jewish ancestry, or a Mischling in Nazi terminology, who served as a Heer (land forces) soldier of the Wehrmacht for the first 1.5 years of World War II. After the war he became a West German politician.

== Biography ==
=== Pre-WWII ===
Goldberg's father grew up in Königsberg as a member of the Jewish community but had himself undergone baptism in the local Lutheran church, as he wished to become assimilated and marry a Christian. Goldberg and his brother Martin (born 1920) had been baptized in the Grünewald Lutheran Church at their father's request. After Hitler became Chancellor of Germany in 1933, the senior Goldberg lost his position under the Nazi law of April 1933, Law for the Restoration of the Professional Civil Service, which expelled Jews from the German Civil Service under the Aryan Paragraph.

The 1935 Nuremberg Laws classed persons with at least three Jewish grandparents as Jewish; those with two Jewish grandparents would be considered Jewish only if they practised the faith or had a Jewish spouse.

As a child, he went to the Grunewald-Gymnasium in Berlin; he had no idea his father was Jewish until he was suddenly ostracised at school; Goldberg left the school in 1935 when it became Jew-free, and became an apprentice at Schneller und Schmeider, a clothing company jointly owned by a Jew and a non-Jew, where many of his colleagues were Jews or Mischlinge. Goldberg's maternal uncle joined the Nazi Party and refused to be seen with the Goldberg family, even avoiding Goldberg's mother.

In early 1938, Goldberg served a six-month term in the Reich Labour Service whose uniform, as Goldberg stated, "had a swastika on an armband".

=== Wehrmacht service (December 1938- April 1940) ===
On 1 December 1938, Goldberg joined the German Army. He took part in the invasion of Poland on 1 September 1939, serving alongside childhood friend Karl Wolf, whose father was now a high-ranking SS officer.

A 1939 photograph of Goldberg in military uniform appeared in Nazi recruitment propaganda with the caption "The ideal German soldier" ("Der ideale deutsche Soldat").

In 1940, following the Armistice with France, Goldberg was expelled from the army under Hitler's order of 8 April 1940, which stated that all first-degree Mischlinge serving in the Wehrmacht were to be discharged.

=== Remainder of the war ===
Goldberg returned to his former workplace, which had now changed its name to Feodor Schmeider, having been obliged to remove the Jewish name Schneller. Goldberg played an increasingly responsible role within the company, obtaining contracts for uniforms from the army and the navy. He also attended the Reich Committee for Labour Studies school (Reichsausschuss für Arbeitsstudien, RAFA), where he was one of the four out of 80 students who passed the test to become a RAFA teacher. He then became a Labour Studies Board lecturer on the clothing industry, and delivered lectures to organizations and company directors, even publishing an article in the weekly trade publication Textilwoche.

In December 1942, Goldberg's father was admitted to hospital. The Gestapo, however, raided the hospital and sent him to a Jewish one which had been requisitioned by the Gestapo for use as a prison, from which Jews were taken and sent to Auschwitz. On Christmas Eve, gambling that the guards would be drunk or absent, Goldberg took his father out of the hospital. The elder Goldberg was soon back in the hands of the Gestapo, and in April 1943 was summoned for deportation; Werner told him not to show up, and he was again saved. The father and son were the only members of their immediate family to survive the war.

=== Post-war ===
Werner Goldberg later joined the Christian Democratic Union of Germany and served twenty years between 1959 and 1979 as a politician of the Abgeordnetenhaus of Berlin in West Berlin. He died in Berlin on 28 September 2004, aged 84; he was survived by his wife Gertrud Goldberg, and three children.

== In popular culture ==
Goldberg's story formed part of the 2006 documentary Hitler's Jewish Soldiers – Nazi-Jews in Hitler's Army, a 58-minute film produced by Larry Price in association with the Israel Broadcasting Authority. Price's film was inspired by the 2002 book Hitler's Jewish Soldiers: The Untold Story of Nazi Racial Laws and Men of Jewish Descent in the German Military by Bryan Mark Rigg.

Goldberg featured in the episode "The Jews Who Fought for Hitler" of the Yesterday TV series Nazi Collaborators, first screened in the UK in December 2010.

In 2015, the photograph was used for the monument to "Protectors of Motherland" in Tobolsk, Russia, as a surrogate for an image of a Red Army soldier, reportedly by mistake. The image on the monument was promptly fixed.

== See also ==
- Erhard Milch – Nazi-era Luftwaffe general with partial Jewish ancestry
- Hessy Levinsons Taft – Jewish infant girl also used in Nazi propaganda

== Notes ==
- Stoltzfus, Nathan; Lacqueur, Walter (2001). Resistance of the Heart: Intermarriage and the Rosenstrasse Protest in Nazi Germany. Rutgers University Press. ISBN 0-8135-2909-3 – via Google Books.
- Rigg, Mark (2004). Hitler's Jewish Soldiers: The Untold Story of Nazi Racial Laws and Men of Jewish Descent in the German Military. University Press of Kansas. ISBN 0-7006-1358-7.
- Welch, Steven R. (1999). "Mischling Deserters from the Wehrmacht". The Leo Baeck Institute Year Book. 44 (1): 273–324. doi:10.1093/leobaeck/44.1.273.
