= German Blood Certificate =

Document given by Hitler to those of some Jewish heritage declaring them of German blood

A German Blood Certificate (German: Deutschblütigkeitserklärung) was a document provided by Nazi leader Adolf Hitler to Mischlinge (those with partial Jewish heritage), declaring them deutschblütig (of German blood). This practice was begun sometime after the Nuremberg Laws of 1935, and allowed exemption from most of Germany's racial laws.

Mischling is a term used during the Third Reich era in Germany to denote people deemed to have partial Jewish ancestry. This word literally means "mixling", a derogatory loanword describing one who is "mixed".

In order to join the Nazi party and get a certificate, the candidate had to prove through baptismal records that all direct ancestors born since 1750 were not Jewish, or they could apply for a German Blood Certificate.

These certificates were 300 by 210 millimetres (11 3/4 by 8 1/4 inches), with a signature on the front and the red seal of the Office of Racial Research of the Nazi Party. The back listed the ancestry of the individual concerned, back to the grandparents of the father and the mother.

== Purpose of the German Blood Certificate ==
The Nuremberg Laws, also known as the Anti-Jewish laws, were statutes created in Germany for the stated purpose of maintaining blood purity of the Aryan race. The laws indicating the necessity of obtaining a German Blood Certificate were implemented at the time relationships between Aryan and Jews were outlawed. German Blood Certificates were documentations that classified who was of "German or related blood". Aryans could face a prison sentence if they were to go against the established laws. Aryan and Jewish families already married with children were labeled as Mischling, and thus were encouraged to divorce. Such relationships were deemed as "blood treason". The Nuremberg Laws did not define people as Jewish by cultural values, but rather looked at how many Jewish grandparents they had. Specifically, those who had three or four Jewish grandparents were considered Jews, despite any conversions to Christianity. Jews were seen as an inferior race by the Nazis, thus they saw the need to segregate the Jews from the German community. As a result of the Nuremberg Laws, Jewish people were denied German citizenship even though Germany was their homeland. The establishment of the Nuremberg Laws paved the path towards the Holocaust.

== The Law of Protecting German Blood and Honour ==
Hitler outlined laws meant to regulate marriage conflicts between Aryans and non-Aryans. The law consisted of various paragraphs, four of which focused on Jews. The law prohibited relationships between those of German blood or related with Jews; it stated that violations could result in imprisonment. The law also made it clear that it was unlawful for Jews to employ German females or their family members under the age of 45. It was also deemed unacceptable for Jews to be associated with the Reich flag. People of Jewish descent and Germans who had Jewish spouses were persecuted by the Nazi regime. Everyone in Germany was required to carry around an identification card; however, Jewish people had specific identification marks stamped on their cards for police to easily determine and recognize who was Jewish. Those considered Mischlinge appeared to accept the Nuremberg Laws, although some people were oppressed. The Nazis put these laws to use in attempts to expel Jews and Mischlinge from the Aryan society.

== Use of Nazi propaganda ==
The use of Nazi propaganda played a crucial role in spreading the message of the importance of blood purity. Hitler established a Reich Ministry in 1933 to ensure that the Nazi message was communicated freely by all means; it was headed by Joseph Goebbels. The media was pervasive in their methods of portraying Jews as sexual offenders in films, while stressing the consequences that would occur if any laws were broken. Nazi propaganda also led to campaigns protesting against Jews.

== Education ==
Aside from the use of Nazi propaganda, education played a key role in spreading the message about blood purity. Teachers were given specific instructions on what they were to teach their students. Children were taught and warned about the consequences they would face if they were to engage in personal relationships with a non-Aryan.

== Prominent recipients ==
- Albrecht Haushofer (1903–1945), German geographer and resistance activist against Nazism
- Children of Gotthard Heinrici (1886–1971), German army colonel-general
- Erhard Milch (1892–1972), German Luftwaffe field marshal and inspector-general of the Luftwaffe

== See also ==
- Honorary Aryan
- Ahnenpass (literally ancestor passport)
- Aryan certificate (Ariernachweis)
- Limpieza de sangre
