= Bezlyudovka =

Bezlyudovka Безлюдовка
- Selo
- Location within Belgorod Oblast Location within Russia
- Coordinates: 50°23′N 36°46′E
- Country: Russia
- Region: Belgorod Oblast
- District: Shebekinsky District
- Time zone: UTC+3:00

Bezlyudovka (Russian: Безлюдовка) is a rural locality (a selo) in Shebekinsky District, Belgorod Oblast, Russia. The population was 824 as of 2010. There are 20 streets.

== Geography ==
Bezlyudovka is located 15 km west of Shebekino (the district's administrative centre) by road. Grafovka is the nearest rural locality.
