= Mischling =

Nazi German racial classification

Mischling (German: [ˈmɪʃlɪŋ]; lit. 'mix-ling'; pl. Mischlinge) was a pejorative legal term which was used in Nazi Germany to denote persons of mixed "Aryan" and "non-Aryan", such as Jewish, ancestry as they were classified by the Nuremberg racial laws of 1935. In German, the word has the general connotation of “hybrid”, “mongrel”, or “half-breed”. Outside its use in official Nazi terminology, the term Mischlingskinder ('mixed children') was later used to refer to war babies born to non-white soldiers and German mothers in the aftermath of World War II.

== Nazi definitions of Mischling ==
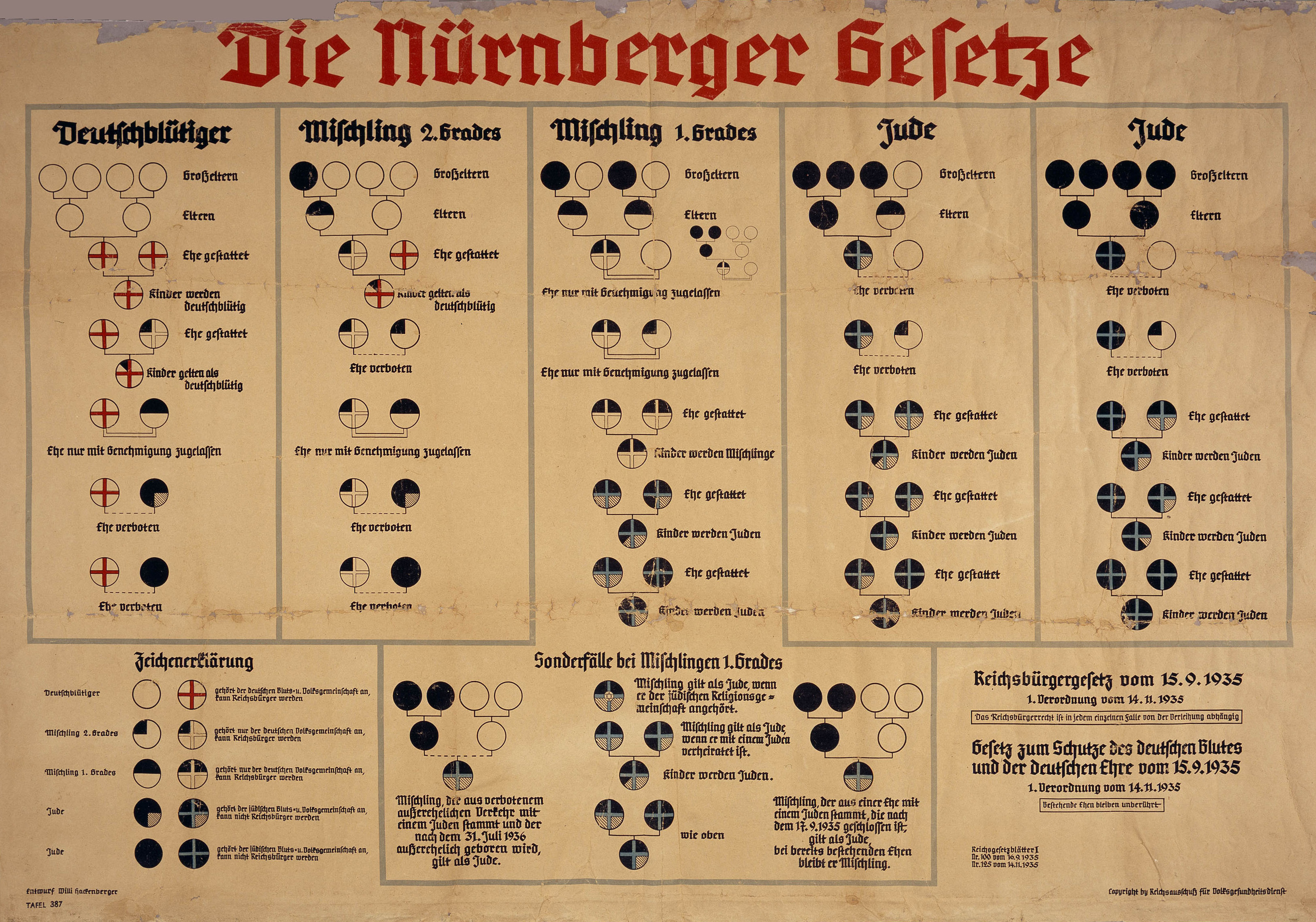
The diagram shows the pseudoscientific racial division, according to the Nuremberg Laws, which was the basis of the racial policies of Nazi Germany. Only people with four German grandparents (four white circles – leftmost column) were considered to be Germans of “full-blood”. German nationals with three or four Jewish ancestors (at rightmost) were considered Jews. The center column shows the Mischling grade, either 1 or 2, depending on the number of one's Jewish ancestors. All Jewish grandparents were automatically defined as members of the Jewish religious community (regardless of whether they actually identified their religion as such.)

Nazis relied on one's ancestors' religious backgrounds to determine whether someone was of "German or related blood" ("Aryan") or a "Jew" ("non-Aryan"). Thus, the Nuremberg Laws in 1935 defined a "full Jew" (Istjude or Volljude in Nazi terminology) as a person – regardless of religious affiliation or self-identification – who had at least three grandparents who had been enrolled with a Jewish congregation or were married to a Jewish spouse. A person with two Jewish grandparents was also legally "Jewish" (so-called Geltungsjude, roughly speaking, in English: "Jew by legal validity" or "to be deemed/reckoned as a Jew") if that person met any of these racial conditions created by Nazis:

- Was enrolled as a member of a Jewish congregation when the Nuremberg Laws were issued or joined later
- Was married to a "full Jew".
- Was the offspring from a marriage with a Jew, which was concluded after the 1935 ban on mixed marriages.
- Was the offspring of an extramarital affair with a Jew, born out of wedlock after 31 July 1936.

A person who did not belong to any of these categorical conditions, but had two Jewish grandparents was classified as a Jewish Mischling of the first degree according to the racial constructs implemented by Nazis. A person with only one Jewish grandparent was classified as a Mischling of the second degree.

Following the passage of the Nuremberg Laws, in November 1935, the Citizenship Law gained its first amendment, and it stated that Jews were to be stripped of all of their civil rights, including the right to vote. Within the amendment the Law for the Defense of German Blood and Honor took effect, defining various forbidden marriage scenarios for Mischling specifically. Nazis claimed that it was acceptable for Mischling of the first degree to marry "full Jews" in turn becoming Jewish as well as marry other Mischling. However, this law prohibited Mischling from marrying Germans and thereby mixing "races". Hitler’s goal of this amendment was to have as many Mischling as possible become a "full Jew" through marriage. A month later a second amendment was added to the Citizenship Law on 21 December 1935, which continued the persecution against Jews by removing "full Jews" or Mischling from professions such as those in the education, health, and civic departments.

According to the 1939 Reich census, there were about 72,000 Mischlinge of the 1st degree, ~39,000 of the 2nd degree, and potentially tens of thousands at higher degrees, which went unrecorded as those people were considered Aryans by the Reich.

Military policy toward Jewish Mischlinge changed during the Nazi period. On 8 April 1940, Hitler ordered first-degree Mischlinge serving in the Wehrmacht to be discharged from all branches of the armed forces, although individual exceptions could be granted; second-degree Mischlinge remained in military service.

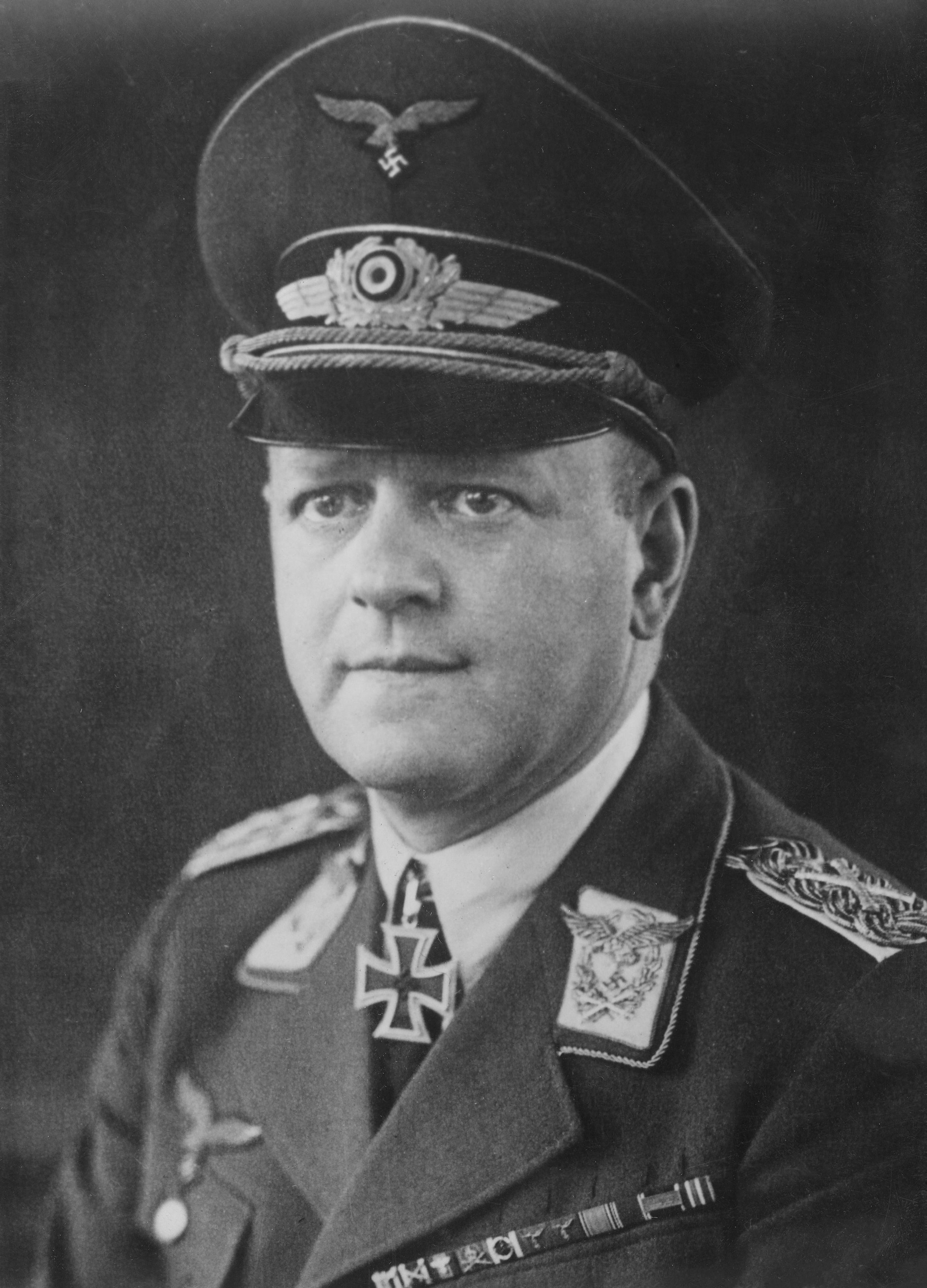
Erhard Milch (1942), whose father was Jewish

According to historian Bryan Mark Rigg, up to 160,000 soldiers who were one-quarter, one-half, and even fully Jewish served in the German armed forces during World War II. This included several generals, admirals, and at least one field marshal: Erhard Milch.

== Jewish identity in society ==
Soon after the passage of the Enabling Act of 1933, the Nazi government promulgated several antisemitic statutes, including the Law for the Restoration of the Professional Civil Service on 7 April 1933. Using this law, the regime aimed to dismiss—along with all politically-suspect persons such as social democrats, socialists, communists, and many liberals of all religions—all "non-Aryans" from all government positions in society, including public educators, and those practicing medicine in state hospitals.

As a result, the term "non-Aryan" had to be defined in a way that was compatible with Nazi ideology. Under the "First Racial Definition" supplementary decree of 11 April, issued to clarify portions of the act passed four days prior, a "non-Aryan" (e.g., a Jew) was defined as one who had at least one Jewish parent or grandparent. Later, German citizens with only one Jewish grandparent were defined by the Nuremberg Laws as Mischling of the second degree. Their employment restrictions remained, but they were permitted to marry non-Jewish and non-Mischling Germans, and were not imprisoned. This distinction was not applied to non-German citizens.

According to the philosophy of Nazi antisemitism, Jewry was considered a group of people bound by close, genetic (blood) ties who formed an ethnic unit that one could neither join nor secede from. Early 20th-century books on Nordicism such as Madison Grant's The Passing of the Great Race had a profound effect on Hitler's antisemitism. He was convinced that the Nordic Race/Culture constituted a superior branch of humanity, and viewed International Jewry as a parasitic and inferior race, determined to corrupt and exterminate both Nordic peoples and their culture through Rassenschande ("racial pollution") and cultural corruption.

Hitler declared that Marxism was constructed by International Jewry, with the aim of Bolshevising the earth, ultimately allowing Jewry to dominate/exterminate the Aryan race. With this in mind, Hitler viewed Russia as a nation of Untermenschen ("subhumans" or "Inferiors") dominated by their Judaic masters, which posed the gravest threat to both Germany and Europe as a whole.

The Nazis defined Jewishness as partly genetic, but did not always use formal genetic tests or physiognomic (facial) features to determine one's status (although the Nazis talked a lot about physiognomy as a racial characteristic). In practice, records concerning the religious affiliation(s) of one's grandparents were often the deciding factor (mostly christening records and membership registers of Jewish congregations).

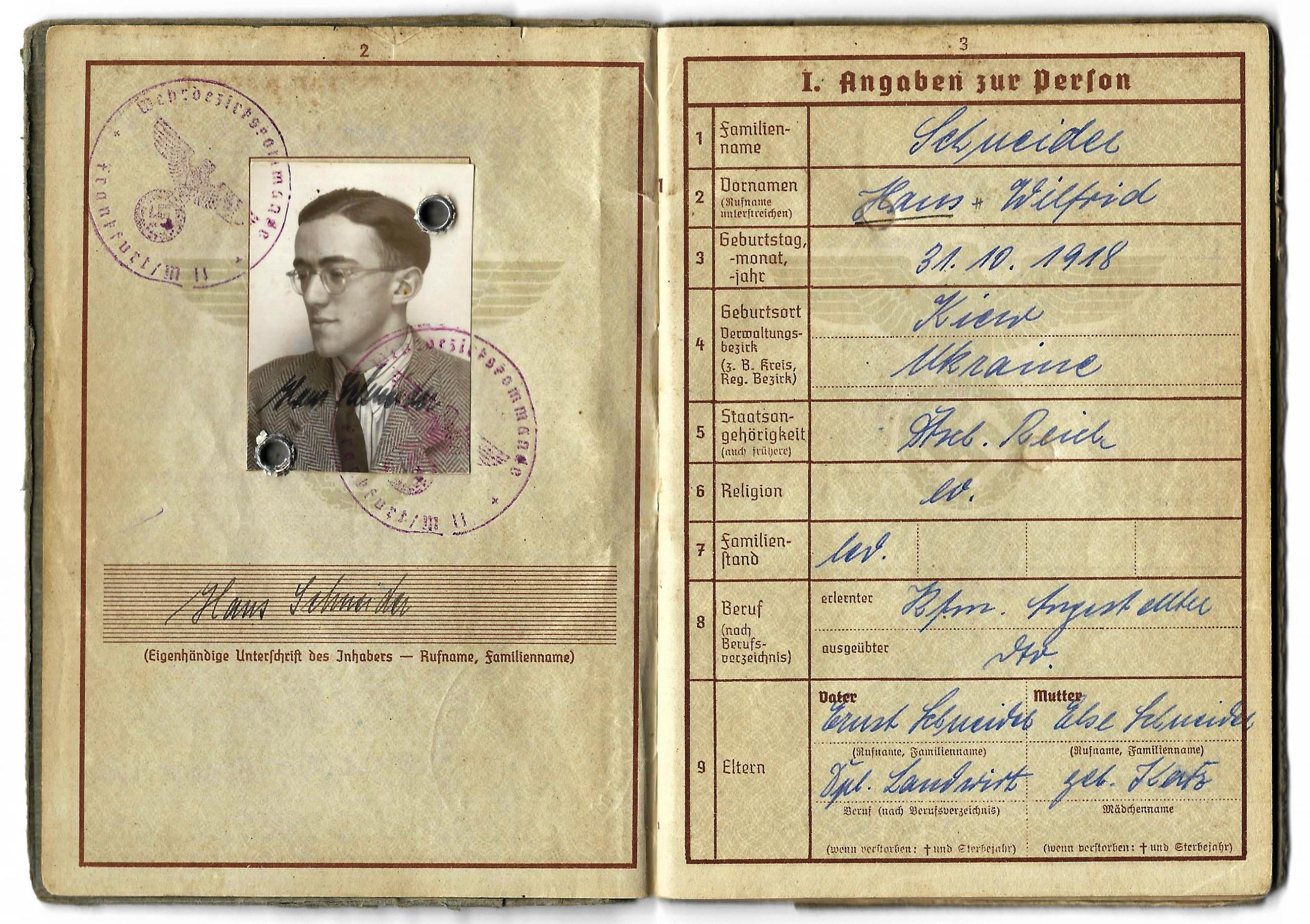
1938 German Wehrpass issued to a Jewish man classified as a Mischling and released from active duty two years later.

=== Reclassification procedures ===
Nonetheless, reclassification procedures of Mischling were conducted within society. These requests for reclassification (e.g., Jew to Mischling of 1st degree, Mischling of 1st degree to 2nd degree, etc.) or Aryanization (see German Blood Certificate) were rarely given, as each had to be personally reviewed and concurred by Adolf Hitler. Once approved by the Nazi party chancellery and Hitler, it was recognized throughout the Nazi community as an act of grace (Gnadenakt). Other de facto reclassifications, lacking any official document, were privileges accorded by high-ranking Nazis to certain artists and other experts by way of special protection.

The second way of reclassification was through a declaratory judgment in court. Usually, the discriminated person took the action, questioning their descent from the Jewish-classified man until then regarded as their biological (grand)father. Paternity suits aiming for reclassification (German: Abstammungsverfahren) appeared mostly with deceased, divorced, or illegitimate (grand)fathers. They usually sought to change the discriminated litigant's status from Jewish-classified to Mischling of first degree, or from Mischling of first degree to second degree. The numbers of such suits soared whenever the Nazi government imposed new discriminations and persecutions (such as the Nuremberg Laws in 1935, Kristallnacht in 1938, and the systematic deportations of Jewish Germans and Gentile Germans of Jewish descent to concentration camps in 1941).

The process was humiliating for the (grand)mothers who had to declare in court that they had committed adultery. The petitions were successful in the majority of cases. The high success rate recorded was a result of several factors. First, there was no risk in paternity suits since litigant classification cannot be downgraded. Consequently, lawyers were willing to represent litigants, though it was common practice to refuse hopeless cases. Some lawyers even specialized in this type of procedure. Second, usually, all the family members cooperated; including the sometimes still-living disputed (grand)father. Likely alternative fathers were often named, who either appeared themselves in court confirming their likely fatherhood, or who were already dead but were known as good friends, neighbors, or subtenants of the (grand)mother. Third, the obligatory and humiliating body examinations of those under suspicion were skewed by stereotypical Jewish perceptions. Expert witnesses would search for allegedly Jewish facial features, as conceived and understood by anti-Semites. If the doubted (grand)father was already dead, emigrated, or deported (as after 1941), the examination searched for these supposedly "Jewish" features in the physiognomy of the descendant (child). Since anti-Semitic clichés on Jewish outward appearance were so stereotyped, the average litigant did not show features clearly indicating their Jewish descent, so they often documented ambiguous results as medical evidence. Fourth, the judges tended to believe the accounts of the (grand)mothers, alternative fathers, doubted fathers, and other witnesses who had endured such public humiliation. They were not recorded for earlier perjuring, and judges would declare the prior paternity annulled, ensuring the status improvement for the litigant.

=== Standards of the Schutzstaffel (SS) ===
The Schutzstaffel (SS) used a more stringent standard. In order to join, a candidate had to prove (presumably through baptismal records) that all direct ancestors born since 1750 were not Jewish, or they would have to apply for a German Blood Certificate instead. When the stresses of World War II made it impracticable to confirm the ancestry of officer candidates, the extended proof of ancestry regulation was diminished to the standard laws requiring certified evidence of non-Judaism within two generations.

=== Jewish Mischlinge as Christian converts ===
In the 19th century, many Jewish Germans converted to Christianity; most of them becoming Protestants rather than Catholics. Two-thirds of the German population were Protestant until 1938, when the Anschluss annexation of Austria to Germany added six million Catholics. The addition of 3.25 million Catholic Czechoslovaks of German ethnicity (Sudeten Germans) increased the percentage of Roman Catholics in Greater Germany to 41% (approximately 32.5 million vs. 45.5 million Protestants or 57%) in a 1939 population estimated at 79 million. One percent of the population was Jewish.

German converts from Judaism typically adopted whichever Christian denomination was most dominant in their community. Therefore, about 80% of the Gentile Germans persecuted as Jews according to the Nuremberg Laws were affiliated with one of the 28 regionally-delineated Protestant church bodies. In 1933, approximately 77% of German Gentiles with Jewish ancestry were Protestant. In the 1939 census, however, the percentage dropped to 66%. This is due to the annexation of several areas in 1938, including Vienna and Prague, both of which have relatively large and well-established Catholic populations of Jewish descent. Converts to Christianity and their descendants had often married Christians with no recent Jewish ancestry.

As a result, by the time the Nazis came to power, many Protestants and Roman Catholics in Germany had some traceable Jewish ancestry (usually traced back by the Nazi authorities for two generations), so that the majority of 1st- or 2nd-degree Mischlinge were Protestant, yet many were Catholics. A considerable number of German Gentiles with Jewish ancestry were irreligionists.

Lutherans with Jewish ancestry were largely in northwestern and northern Germany, Evangelical Protestants of Jewish descent in Central Germany (Berlin and its southwestern environs) and the country's east. Catholics with Jewish ancestry lived mostly in Western and Southern Germany, Austria and what is now the Czech Republic.

== Mischlinge-founded organizations ==
On 20 July 1933, initiated by the actor Gustav Friedrich, Christian Germans of Jewish descent founded a self-help organisation, initially named Reich Federation of Christian-German Citizens of non-Aryan or not of purely Aryan descent (German: Reichsbund christlich-deutscher Staatsbürger nichtarischer oder nicht rein arischer Abstammung e.V.). The federation first counted only 4,500 members. In October 1934, the name was shortened to Reich association of non-Aryan Christians (German: Reichsverband der nichtarischen Christen). In 1935, members of the federation elected the known literary historian Heinrich Spiero their new president. Under his direction the federation's journal was improved and the number of members rose to 80,000 by 1936. In September 1936, the federation was renamed the more confident St Paul's Covenant Union of non-Aryan Christians (German: Paulus-Bund Vereinigung nichtarischer Christen e.V.) after the famous Jewish convert to Christianity Paul the Apostle.

In January 1937, the Nazi government forbade that organisation, allowing a new successor organisation named the 1937 Association of Provisional Reich Citizens of not purely German-blooded Descent (German: Vereinigung 1937 vorläufiger Reichsbürger nicht rein deutschblütiger Abstammung). This name cited the insecure legal status of Mischlinge, who had been assigned the revocable status of preliminary Reich's citizens by the Nuremberg Laws, while Jewish-classified Germans had become second-class state citizens (Staatsbürger) by these laws. The 1937 Association was prohibited from accepting state citizens as members—like Spiero—with three or four grandparents, who had been enrolled in a Jewish congregation. Thus that new association had lost its most prominent leaders and faded, having become an organisation solely for Mischlinge. The 1937 Association was compulsorily dissolved in 1939.

Pastor Heinrich Grüber and some enthusiasts started a new effort in 1936 to found an organisation to help Protestants of Jewish descent (Mischlinge and their (grand)parents, of whom at least one was classified as non-Aryan), but went completely neglected by the then official Protestant church bodies in Germany (see Protestants of Jewish descent).

After the war some Mischlinge founded the still-existing Notgemeinschaft der durch die Nürnberger Gesetze Betroffenen (Emergency association of those affected by the Nuremberg Laws).

== Prominent persons characterized as Mischlinge according to Nazi ideology ==
Some examples of Mischlinge:

- Paul Ascher, Commander, 1st-degree Mischling receiving the German Blood Certificate
- Rudi Ball, ice hockey player and participant of the 1936 Olympic Winter Games, 1st-degree Mischling
- Erich Collin, second tenor of the Comedian Harmonists, emigrated to the US in 1935, 1st-degree Mischling
- Muriel Gardiner, psychoanalyst and psychiatrist, anti-Fascist activist, emigrated in autumn 1939 to the US, 1st-degree Mischling
- Horst Geitner, Iron Cross-awarded soldier, 1st-degree Mischling
- Ralph Giordano, writer and journalist, 1st-degree Mischling
- Werner Goldberg, Wehrmacht soldier and Nazi model, 1st-degree Mischling
- Hans von Herwarth, German diplomat, providing the Allies with information prior to and during World War II, 2nd-degree Mischling, later considered full Aryan
- Rainer Hildebrandt, anti-communist resistance fighter, historian and founder of the Checkpoint Charlie Museum, 1st-degree Mischling
- Gotthard Heinrici, Heer General), wife had a Jewish parent, he received the German Blood Certificate
- Walter H. Hollaender, Colonel, 1st-degree Mischling received the German Blood Certificate
- Ingeborg Hunzinger, sculptor, 1st-degree Mischling
- Helene Jacobs, member of the Confessing Church and of the German Resistance against Nazism, 1st-degree Mischling
- Helmuth Kopp, entered the Wehrmacht in 1941, grandfather and mother Jewish, but the grandfather did not see him as Jewish
- Helmut Kruger, "He did all he could to prove his loyalty to Germany by showing his bravery in battle. He won the EKII, the EKI, and the Golden Wound Badge," mother was Jewish
- Karl-Erich Kühlenthal, Abwehr spy, handler of Alaric (double agent working for the British as Garbo), 1st-degree Mischling
- Elisabeth Langgässer, author and teacher, 1st-degree Mischling
- Emil Maurice, was an early member of the National Socialist German Workers Party and a founding member of the Schutzstaffel (SS).
- Anton Mayer, served in Adolf Hitler's army, wearing Nazi symbols, half-Jewish.
- Helene Mayer, world champion Olympic fencer and participant in the 1936 Summer Olympic Games, 1st-degree Mischling
- Harry Meyen, German film actor, 1st-degree Mischling
- Inge Meysel, German actress and television performer, 1st degree Mischling
- Erhard Milch, Luftwaffe Field Marshal (Jewish father and Christian mother, 1st-degree Mischling) reclassified as Aryan by Adolf Hitler
- Ludwig Carl Moyzisch, diplomatic attaché of the Nazi Germany Embassy in Ankara, Turkey in 1943, second degree mischling
- Rudolf Petersen, Hamburg's first post-war First Burgomaster (i.e. simultaneous mayor and governor of the city state), 1st-degree Mischling
- Bernhard Rogge, Kriegsmarine captain, commander of the auxiliary cruiser Atlantis, 2nd-degree Mischling
- Helmut Schmidt, group leader (Scharführer) in the Hitler Youth organization and later Chancellor of West Germany, Jewish grandfather
- Melitta Schenk Gräfin von Stauffenberg, aviator, obscured ancestry, unveiled in 1940 as 1st-degree Mischling, received the German Blood Certificate
- Otto Heinrich Warburg, physiologist, medical doctor and Nobel laureate, leading biochemist, 1st-degree Mischling
- Helmuth Wilberg, Luftwaffe general, 1st-degree Mischling declared Aryan in 1935 by Hitler
- Johannes Zuckertort, General for the Nazi army and Adolf Hitler, half-Jewish

== Fate during the Nazi era ==
=== Discrimination in education, vocation and marriage ===
Those who were considered Mischlinge were generally restricted in their options of partners and marriage. Mischlinge of first degree generally needed permission to marry, and usually only to other Mischlinge or Jewish-classified persons; however, a marriage to a Jewish-classified person would re-categorize the Mischling as Geltungsjude (Full Jew). After 1942, marriage permissions were generally not granted any more—arguably due to the war—without further notice. Mischlinge of second degree did not need permission to marry a spouse classified as Aryan; however, marriage with Mischlinge of any degree was unwelcome. The reasoning behind this was that a Mischling marrying an Aryan would produce a child with an acceptably low amount of Jewish heritage, but a Mischling marrying a Mischling would just produce another Mischling.

1st-degree Mischlinge, more so than those of 2nd-degree, had restricted access to higher education and were generally forbidden from attending such schools in 1942. As for vocations, most jobs in the public sphere—such as journalism, teaching, performing arts, government positions, politics etc.—were inaccessible to Mischlinge. Exceptions were granted for some prominent persons and those who acquired the necessary German blood certificates.

=== Mischlinge recruitment into the Organization Todt ===
Organization Todt served as a civil and military-based engineering program that was named after its founder, Fritz Todt. This group became notorious for utilizing forced labor to develop large-scale construction projects throughout Germany and Nazi-occupied territories. Beginning in the autumn of 1944, between 10,000 and 20,000 half-Jews (Mischlinge) and persons related to Jews by a so-called mixed marriage were recruited into special units of the Organisation Todt.

=== Jewish Mischlinge in German-occupied Europe ===
While the classifications of Mischling also applied in occupied Western and Central Europe, and were well-documented for the Netherlands and Protectorate Bohemia and Moravia, this was not the case in Eastern Europe. Persons who would have been deemed Jewish Mischlinge, in the East were classified as Jews in German-annexed Poland (Danzig-West Prussia, Warthegau, etc.), German-occupied Poland (General Government), German-occupied parts of the Soviet Union, and the German-occupied Soviet-annexed Baltic/Eastern Polish territories. Consequently, an unknown number of Christians of recent Jewish background from Poland and other occupied territories, primarily Catholics or Eastern Orthodox in this case, were killed as "Jewish" in the Holocaust. Dr. Richard Harvey estimated that of 776,000 "full Jews" who identified as practicing Christians in Europe during World War II, approximately 396,000 (51%) died in the Holocaust. 222,000 survived (29%), while the fate of 158,000 (20%) remains unknown.

== See also ==
- Nazi eugenics
- Rhineland Bastard
- Rosenstrasse protest
- Who is a Jew?
- Geltungsjude
- Castizo
- Mestizo
- Mixed-blood
- Mulatto
- Pardo
- Quadroon
- Zambo
- German Jewish military personnel of World War II

== Bibliography ==
- Baumel, Judith Tydor (2001). The Holocaust Encyclopedia. Yale University Press. ISBN 0-300-08432-3.
- Bothe-von Richthofen, Felicitas. Widerstand in Wilmersdorf, Memorial to the German Resistance (ed.), Berlin: Gedenkstätte Deutscher Widerstand, 1993, (=Schriftenreihe über den Widerstand in Berlin von 1933 bis 1945; vol. 7), pp. 140seq. ISBN 3-926082-03-8.
- Ehmann, Annegret (2001). "Mischlinge". In Walter Laqueur; Judith Tydor Baumel (eds.). The Holocaust Encyclopedia. New Haven and London: Yale University Press. ISBN 978-0-30008-432-0.
- Faust, Hans. "Vorläufer des Bundes der Verfolgten des Naziregimes Berlin e. V.", in Die Mahnung (periodical of the Bund der Verfolgten des Naziregimes. Berlin e. V., i.e. Berlin Federation of the Persecuted of the Nazi Regime), 1 September 1983.
- Fehrenbach, Heide (2001). "Of German Mothers and "Negermischlingskinder"; Race, Sex, and the Postwar Nation". In Hammah Schissler (ed.). The Miracle Years: A Cultural History of West Germany, 1949–1968. Princeton and Oxford: Princeton University Press. ISBN 0-691-05819-9.
- Genscher, Hans-Dietrich. "Leben und Wirken Dr. Rainer Hildebrandts", in Rabin-Gedenkkonzert mit Keren Hadar, Maya Zehden (ed.) on behalf of the Deutsch-Israelische Gesellschaft / Arbeitsgemeinschaft Berlin und Potsdam, Berlin: no publ., 2009, p. 32. No ISBN
- Gruner, Wolf (2006). Jewish Forced Labor Under the Nazis. Economic Needs and Racial Aims, 1938–1944. Institute of Contemporary History, Munich and Berlin. New York: Cambridge University Press. Published in association with the United States Holocaust Memorial Museum. ISBN 978-0-521-83875-7
- Lehrer, Steven (2000). Wannsee house and the Holocaust. McFarland. p. 74. ISBN 978-0-7864-0792-7.
- McKale, Donald, Hitler’s Shadow War: The Holocaust and World War II. Cooper Square Press, 2002 p. 244* "Told French President of Jewish Origins – Helmut Schmidt's Revelation Reported". Los Angeles Times. 25 February 1988. Retrieved 25 September 2009.
- Messinger, Heinz. Langenscheidts Handwörterbuch Englisch, 2 parts, Teil II: Deutsch-English. Berlin (West) et al.: Langenscheidt, 1959.
- Talty, S. (2012). Agent Garbo: The Brilliant, Eccentric Secret Agent Who Tricked Hitler and Saved D-Day. Boston: Houghton Mifflin. pp. 104–05. ISBN 9780547614816. In his MI5 file, the British noted an anomaly: Kühlenthal was 'a half blood Jew.' Canaris had him legally declared an Aryan in 1941, but the conversion didn't sit well with Kühlenthal's peers.
- Welch, Steven R. (1999). "Mischling Deserters from the Wehrmacht". The Leo Baeck Institute Year Book. 44 (1): 273–324. doi:10.1093/leobaeck/44.1.273.
