= Helmuth Wilberg =

German air force general (1880–1941)

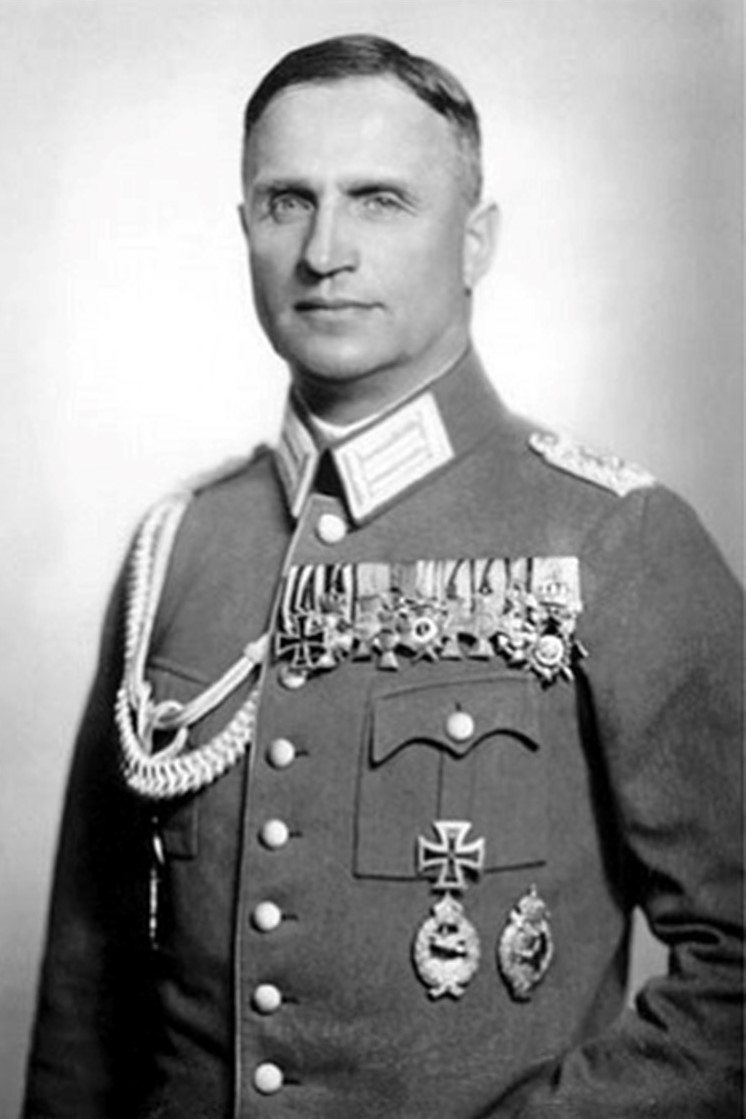
- Born: 1 June 1880; Berlin, Province of Brandenburg, Kingdom of Prussia, German Empire
- Died: 20 November 1941 (aged 61) near Dresden, German Reich
- Military career
- Allegiance: German Empire; Weimar Republic; Nazi Germany
- Branch: Luftwaffe
- Service years: 1899–1941
- Rank: General der Flieger

Helmuth Wilberg (1 June 1880 – 20 November 1941) was a German officer and a Luftwaffe General of the Air Force during the Second World War. He helped develop the German war strategy of blitzkrieg. He was of half-Jewish ancestry, and was given the status of Honorary Aryan by Adolf Hitler.

== Military career ==
Wilberg joined the 80. Fusilier Regiment "von Gersdorff" (Kurhessisches) on 18 April 1899. He was promoted to Leutnant (lieutenant) on 27 January 1900. Starting in 1906, he worked as an instructor at the cadet schools at Naumburg and Lichterfelde. On 18 October 1909 he was promoted to Oberleutnant (senior lieutenant).

On 15 September 1910, he was the 26th German to receive a civilian pilot's license (Alter Adler) issued by the German Airship Association (DLV). In 1911, after having participated in the Kaiser maneuvers in Mecklenburg, he wrote the paper, "Aerial Reconnaissance in Kaisermanöver 1911: Its value and influence on leadership compared with the cavalry reconnaissance". In 1913, he enlisted in the Luftstreitkräfte (Imperial German Air Force), and was one of Germany's first military pilots. When war broke out he was a Hauptmann (captain) and commanding officer of 11. Feldfliegerabteilung (Field Aviation Battalion). He later served as Kommandeur der Flieger (commander of aviation, Kofl) of Fourth Army.

After the war, he was transferred to the Reichswehr. He served there until 1927, when he transferred to the Ministry of Defense; he also served with the Truppenamt, and finally as head of Luftschutzreferats.

He later joined the 18th Infantry Regiment as a battalion commander, with the rank of Oberstleutnant (lieutenant colonel). From 1929 to 1932, he commanded the Breslau vicinity, being appointed Generalmajor (major general). He headed the Reichswehr air staff for eight years in the 1920s.

Hermann Göring, in command of the Luftwaffe, considered making Wilberg Chief of staff. However, it was revealed Wilberg had a Jewish mother, which according to the Nazi racial laws he would be considered a "half-Jew" (Halbjude). Not wishing his talent to go to waste, Göring had him reclassified as being "Aryan" and Wilberg remained in the air staff, helping draw up its principal doctrine, "The Conduct of the Aerial War", and its "Regulation 16" under Walther Wever.

In subsequent years, he worked secretly on rebuilding the Luftwaffe, which he joined in 1934. Wilberg was initially a department head in the Reichsluftfahrtministerium (Ministry of Aviation, RLM). In 1935, he took over the construction of the air war school in Werder an der Havel, and later the Higher Air Force School in Berlin.

Wilberg significantly influenced German air war doctrine. In 1937, he created "Special Staff W", responsible for collecting and analyzing the tactical lessons learned by the Legion Condor during the Spanish Civil War. In March 1938, he was promoted General der Flieger. In the mobilization prior of the 1939 Invasion of Poland, Wilberg was reactivated and used as head of aviation training command.

On 20 November 1941, he was killed in a plane crash near Dresden, on his way to the funeral of Ernst Udet.

== Awards ==
- Royal Order of the Crown of Prussia IV. Class
- Iron Cross (1914) II. and I. Class
- Knight's Cross of the Royal House Order of Hohenzollern with Swords
- Bavarian Military Merit Order IV. Class with Swords
- Military Merit Cross of Mecklenburg-Schwerin II. Class
- Cross for Distinction in War of Mecklenburg-Stelitz II. Class
- Prussian Military Pilot Badge
- Austrian Military Merit Cross III. Class with war decoration
- Gallipoli Star Ottoman War Medal
- Bulgarian Order for Bravery IV. Class, II. Grade
- Wehrmacht Long Service Award IV. to I. Class
