= Bryan Mark Rigg =

American author and speaker (born 1971)

Bryan Mark Rigg (born March 16, 1971) is an American military historian.

Rigg is the author of several books on World War II history, including Hitler's Jewish Soldiers: The Untold Story of Nazi Racial Laws and Men of Jewish Descent in the German Military and The Rabbi Saved by Hitler's Soldiers: Rebbe Joseph Isaac Schneersohn and His Astonishing Rescue.

In addition to his writing, Rigg has also worked as a professor of history at several universities, including American Military University, Southern Methodist University, and the Phillips Exeter Academy. He has been a frequent contributor to various media outlets, including CNN, NPR, and The New York Times.

== Biography ==
Born in Texas and reared as a Baptist, Rigg studied at Phillips Exeter Academy, graduating in 1991, then attended Yale University and received his B.A. in 1996. He received a grant from the Henry Fellowship to continue his studies in Cambridge University, where Rigg earned his doctorate in 2002. In the summer of 1994 he went to Germany and met Peter Millies, an elderly man who helped Rigg understand the German in a movie they were watching, Europa Europa, about Shlomo Perl, a full Jew who "hid in plain sight" in the Nazi army, posing as a Volksdeutsche orphan named Josef Peters. Millies later told Rigg that he himself was a part-Jew, and introduced him to the subject which was to become his main research topic for many years.

Rigg discovered a large number of "Mischlinge" (part-Jews) who were members of the National Socialist German Workers Party (or "Nazi" Party) and/or served in the German Armed Forces during World War II. In the 1990s, he travelled throughout Europe, primarily Austria and Germany, and interviewed hundreds of these men. His assembled documents, videotapes, and wartime memoirs on the subject are presented as the Bryan Mark Rigg Collection at the Military Archives branch of the Federal German Archives (Bundesarchiv) in Freiburg, Germany.

He has taught as a lecturer at Southern Methodist University and American Military University.

His claims have been used both by Holocaust researchers, as well as Holocaust denial and anti-Zionist groups.

His book Hitler's Jewish Soldiers earned him the Colby Award (for first books in military history) in 2003. Before his work was published, his research was picked up by several newspapers, most notably the London Telegraph, the New York Times and the Los Angeles Times, causing much sensation and generating a lot of criticism from some historians. He has been endorsed by such historians like Michael Berenbaum, Robert Citino, Stephen Fritz, James Corum, Paula Hyman, Nathan Stoltzfus, Norman Naimark, Jonathan Steinberg, Geoffrey P. Megargee, Dennis Showalter and James Tent. He has published several other books since then: Rescued From the Reich, with a foreword by Paula Hyman (Yale University Press 2004), Lives of Hitler's Jewish Soldiers (Kansas, 2009) and The Rabbi Saved by Hitler's Soldiers, with a foreword by Michael Berenbaum (Kansas, 2016). He has also written two books on the Pacific War and Imperial Japan, Flamethrower (Fidelis Press, 2020) and Japan's Holocaust (Knox Hill, 2024).

== Criticism ==
Scholars, like Richard J. Evans, Regius Professor of History at the University of Cambridge, and Omer Bartov, professor of history at Brown University, consider the titles of Rigg's books, such as Hitler's Jewish Soldiers, misleading, because the books are not about Jews as the term is commonly understood, but in almost all cases about Mischlinge ("half-"Jews and "quarter-"Jews) as defined by the Nuremberg laws but not according to Jewish religious law.

Yale professor Henry Turner described Rigg as "not really an intellectual or a historian" and declined to recommend him for graduate studies. Nevertheless, Turner is quoted as saying Hitler's Jewish Soldiers is the "basic book on the subject. People will use it with reservations, but they'll have to use it."

Some Historians have accused Rigg's work as being hyperbolic and sensationalist at the expense of historical accuracy. Rigg's research and books have been described as a misnomer, distorted and misleading. Rigg's thesis has been described as outlandish and absurd.

Rigg was accused of plagiarism during his graduate studies by a German scholar, which led to an investigation by Cambridge University. Ultimately, Rigg was found innocent of any wrongdoing.

== Legal disputes ==
=== Williams v. Rigg court case ===
In May 2020, a court case, Williams v. Rigg, involved allegations of defamation related to statements made by Bryan Mark Rigg about Medal of Honor recipient Hershel "Woody" Williams. Williams claimed that Rigg's statements were false and defamatory and that they posed a risk to his reputation. The dispute arose while the two were collaborating on a book.

Rigg's book meticulously documents numerous instances of Williams' dishonesty, highlighting the challenges Rigg faced in trying to collaborate with Williams on what was intended to be an honest portrayal of his life. Throughout the process, Williams' misrepresentations created obstacles, making it difficult to craft an accurate and truthful biography. Nevertheless, Flamethrower has garnered widespread acclaim, receiving endorsements from some of the most respected figures in the U.S. military. These include General Al Gray, 29th Commandant of the Marine Corps, General Charles Krulak, 31st Commandant of the Marine Corps, former CENTCOM commander General Anthony Zinni, and renowned Marine Corps historian Colonel Jon Hoffman.

Bibliography

- Hitler's Jewish Soldiers: The Untold Story of Nazi Racial Laws and Men of Jewish Descent in the German Military, University Press of Kansas, 2002. ISBN 978-0-7006-1358-8
- Rescued from the Reich: How one of Hitler's Soldiers Saved the Lubavitcher Rebbe, Yale University Press, 2004. ISBN 978-0-300-11531-4
- Lives of Hitler's Jewish Soldiers: The Untold Stories of Hitler's Jewish Soldiers University of Kansas Press, 2009. ISBN 978-0-7006-1638-1
- The Rabbi Saved by Hitler's Soldiers: Rebbe Joseph Isaac Schneersohn and His Astonishing Rescue University of Kansas Press, 2016. ISBN 978-0700622610
- Flamethrower: Iwo Jima Medal of Honor Recipient and U.S. Marine Woody Williams and His Controversial Award, Japan's Holocaust and the Pacific War Fidelis Historia, 2020. ASIN B08666CNSH
- Conquering Learning Disabilities at Any Age: How An ADHD/LD Kid Graduated From Yale and Cambridge, Became A Marine Officer, Military Historian, Financial Advisor And Caring Father Fidelis Historia, 2022. ISBN 978-1734534177
- Japan's Holocaust: History of Imperial Japan's Mass Murder and Rape During World War II Knox Press, 2024. ISBN 9781637586884

== See also ==
- Meno Burg (1789–1853), the highest-ranking Jewish officer in the Prussian army.
