= Glossary of Nazi Germany =

The following are a list of words, terms, concepts and slogans of Nazi Germany used in the historiography covering the Nazi regime. Some words were coined by Adolf Hitler and other Nazi Party members. Other words and concepts were borrowed and appropriated, and other terms were already in use during the Weimar Republic. Finally, some are taken from Germany's cultural tradition.

== 0–9 ==
- 25-point programme – The Nazi Party platform and a codification of its ideology.

== A ==
- Abbeförderung ('dispatching', 'removal') – euphemism for killing.
- abgeräumt ('cleared away') – slang expression for "murdered".
- Abhörverbrecher ('wiretapping criminal') – Germans and others in the occupied countries who illegally listened to foreign news broadcasts.
- Abkindern – an ironically intended colloquial designation for the cancellation of a marriage loan through the production of offspring. In German, ab means "off" and Kind means "child".
- Ablieferungspflicht ('delivery obligation') – delivery duty on farm products and other goods which had to be contributed to the state to be sold on the German market.
- Abrechnung mit den Juden ('the settling of accounts with the Jews') – the removal of Jews from the German economy and society, eventually leading to their extermination in the Holocaust.
- Abschaum ('scum') – any and all political adversaries of the Nazis.
- SS-Abschnitt – SS district or district headquarters.
- Absiedlung ('resettlement') – the forceful removal of people from German-occupied or annexed regions. This term is synonymous with Umsiedlung.
- Abstammungsnachweis ('genealogical certificate') – used to establish the purity of one's Aryan descent.
- Abteilung – a branch, subsection, department or a division within a main office.
- Abteilungsleiter – the head of a section or department.
- Abwehr (German pronunciation: [ˈapˌveːɐ̯]; 'defence') – a German military intelligence (information gathering) organisation that operated from 1920 to 1944. After 4 February 1938, its name in title was Amt Ausland/Abwehr im Oberkommando der Wehrmacht ('Foreign Affairs/Defence Office of the Armed Forces High Command').
- Abwehrangelegenheiten – counterespionage issues.
- Abwehrpolizei – counter-espionage police. They were a function of the border police (Grenzpolizei) controlled by the Gestapo.
- Abwehrstelle (AST, ASt) – Military Intelligence Center.
- Achsenmächte – literally, Axis powers.
- "Achtung, Feind hört mit!" (German pronunciation: [ˈaxtʊŋ faɪ̯nt høːɐ̯t mɪt]; 'Watch out, the enemy is listening!') – Nazi slogan used as a repeated warning against spies published in newspapers, posted in shop windows and restaurants, printed on notepads and even on matchboxes. Also a film.
- Adolphe Légalité – derisory nickname for Hitler in social-revolutionary SA circles following the Reichswehr Trial held before the Leipzig Supreme Court in late September 1930. In the eyes of radical National Socialists, Hitler's Legality Oath had conceded too much to his political enemies, in the same way as had the Duke of Orléans, who adopted the name Philippe Égalité during the French Revolution.
- Afrika Korps – German Africa Corps (DAK) of the Wehrmacht.
- agrarpolitischer Apparat (aA; 'Agrarian Apparatus') – Agricultural Affairs Bureau of the NSDAP, responsible for promoting Blut und Boden ideology.
  - Leadership hierarchy: Reichsleitungsfachberater held by Richard Walther Darré; Gaufachberater; Bezirksfachberater; Kreisfachberater; Ortsgruppenfachberater
  - Agents: LVL; Landesfachberater ('consultants')
  - Administrative: Hilfsreferenten ('staff members'); Sachbearbeiter ('aides'); Hilfsreferenten responsible for day-to-day propaganda campaign
- Ahnenerbe ('ancestral heritage') – a think tank established under the patronage of Heinrich Himmler to research the history of the Aryan race and prove its superiority.
  - Ahnenerbe Forschungs- und Lehrgemeinschaft – Society for Research and the Teaching of Ancestral Heritage.
- Ahnennachweise – genealogical tree used to prove ancestry.
- Ahnenpaß ('ancestor passport') – an identification card which was supposed to be carried by all Germans to demonstrate one's Aryan race lineage.
- Ahnenschein ('genealogical chart') – a document used to show correct Aryan descent.
- Akademiker ('academic') – a member of those professions whose exercise required university study as a prerequisite. The term was avoided because it fostered caste mentality and contradicted the ideal of the Volk community. The proportion of academics from a working-class background increased during the Nazi era, but remained minuscule in actual numbers.
- Auf Kriegsdauer (a. Kr.; 'for the duration of the war') – added to titles to indicate the limited promotion prospects for bureaucrats.
- Aktion ('action') – euphemism for a mass-murder operation.
- Aktion 1005 – ('Action 1005'), also called the Sonderaktion 1005 ('special action 1005') or Enterdungsaktion ('exhuming action'), was the 1942–44 secret Nazi operation for concealing evidence of their own largest mass-killings. Laborers – facetiously called "Sonderkommando 1005" ('special commando/s 1005') – would be taken under guard to a closed death camp to clear the site of structures while a sub-unit, the "Leichenkommandos" ('corpse commandos'), were forced to exhume bodies from mass graves, burn the remains (usually on timber and iron-rail "roasts"), and sometimes to grind down larger bone pieces in portable bone-crusher mills. Some Einsatzgruppen mass graves were also cleared out. (Note: without the 1005 appended, in the camps the word Sonderkommando (lit. 'special unit') euphemistically referred to prisoner-laborers generally who stoked the crematoria, shaved newcomers' hair, processed seized belongings, etc., but were not involved in the exhuming action.)
- Aktion Reinhardt ('mission/action Reinhardt') – code name given on 4 June 1942 for the assignment to exterminate all Polish Jews in honor of SS Deputy Chief Reinhard Heydrich who had been assassinated during a covert operation.
- Aktion T4 – code name for the extermination of mentally ill and handicapped patients by the Nazi authorities. (Named after Tiergartenstraße 4, the address of Nazi Central Office in Berlin.)
- Aktivismus ('activism') – political maxim of National Socialism as a "fighting movement", as opposed to "bourgeois passivity". It was claimed that only through an activist stance had it been possible to "defeat terrorist Marxism". However, that which propaganda ennobled as activism was, especially at the grass-roots level, often only blind action for action's sake.
- Alles für Deutschland ('everything/anything for Germany') – Motto applied to the blades of uniform daggers worn by the SA and National Socialist Motor Corps (NSKK).
- Allgemeine SS (general SS) – general overall body of the SS which included full-time, part-time, active, inactive, and honorary members.
- Alljuda – antisemitic Germanization of the term international Jewry that borrowed from the word alldeutsch ('pan-German'), as in the antisemitic slogan "All-Germany against All-Jewry!" The National Socialists used the word Alljuda to suggest the Allgegenwart ('omnipresence') of the Jewish danger and the "world conspiracy of Judaism"; aggressive terminology that degraded Zionism
- Alpenfestung ('Alpine Fortress') – the region on the Obersalzberg where Hitler was originally supposed to retreat when conducting the battle against the Allies. Hitler never used the Alpenfestung in this capacity and retreated instead into the bunker in Berlin.
- Alter Kämpfer ('old fighter') – A Nazi Party member who joined the party or a party-affiliated organization before the Reichstag election of September 1930, when the Nazi Party made its electoral breakthrough; or who joined the Austrian Nazi Party or an affiliate before the Anschluss. The first 100,000 members of the Party were eligible to wear the Golden Nazi Party Badge. The "old fighters" tended to be the most extreme anti-Semitics in the party.
- Altreich ('old country') – after the annexation of Austria in 1938, referred to the part of Germany that was within the 1937 (pre-annexation) boundaries.
- Amt – a main office, branch or department of a ministry within the Reich.
- Amtsgericht – a court of law with functions over the whole legal field.
- Amtsleiter – a convener of NSDAP Party committees. They were personally answerable to Hitler.
- Amtswalter ('office steward') – Old German-sounding Nazi synonym for "official" or "civil servant" (Beamter) and therefore the preferred term for professional functionaries of the party and its branches. Those persons working in the state apparatus continued to be called Beamte.
- Amt Feierabend ('Office for After-Work Activity') – aimed to organize workers' after-work activities as part of the Strength Through Joy policy.
- Amt Volksbildungswerk ('Office for Popular Education') – aimed to organize ideologically approved education for workers as part of the Strength Through Joy policy.
- Anbauschlacht – Battle for Cultivation.
- Angstbrosche ('badge of fear') – an ironic expression for the Nazi Party pin worn by latecomers to the Party in 1933.
- Anhaltelager – a temporary detention camp.
- Anordnung – an order, instruction or regulation.
- Anschluss (Anschluß) – annexation, in particular the annexation of Austria in March, 1938.
- Anti-Comintern Pact – the agreement by Germany, Japan, and Italy to oppose the Communist International (the Comintern) directed by Josef Stalin and the Soviet Union.
- Arbeit adelt ('labor ennobles') – Motto applied to the blades of uniform daggers worn by officers of the Reichsarbeitsdienst (RAD, the State Labor Service).
- Arbeit macht frei ('work will set you free') – an old German peasant saying, not invented by the Nazis. It was placed above the gate to Auschwitz by the commandant Rudolf Höß. The slogan which appeared on the gates of numerous Nazi death camps and concentration camps was not true; those sent to the camps certainly would not be freed in exchange for their hard labor. Instead they were generally worked to death or exterminated when they could no longer perform labour for the Reich.
- Arbeitnehmerschaft ('workforce') – the Nazis took this word to mean both manual and mental workers.
- "Arbeitertum der Faust und der Stirn" ('Workers of both manual and mental labor') – blue-collar and white-collar workers. This was the Nazi Party self-description as an "all-inclusive workers' party".
- Arbeitsdienstführer ('labor service leader) – an official responsible for labor output and performance in a concentration camp.
- Arbeitserziehungslager ('workers' educational camps') – camps established for recently released concentration camp inmates designed to provide additional training for industrial work.
- Arbeitsplatzwechselverordnung (APWVO) – a legal order to change jobs.
- Arbeitsscheue – a person who avoids work. Germans who rejected opportunities to work were categorized and placed in protective custody (Schutzhaft), which implied that they were slackers. In most instances, they were reported to the Gestapo and thereafter interned at the Buchenwald concentration camp for a three-month period.
- Arbeitsschlacht ('battle for work') – propaganda term for the totality of measures involved in work creation. Because of its military and activist sound, Arbeitsschlacht was one of Hitler's favorite terms until 1937 (the de facto end of unemployment). It was patterned after the Fascist Italian battaglia per il grano ('battle for grain').
- Ariernachweis – a Certificate of Descent (to show "Aryan" heritage) (popular name).
- Aryan – the Germanic "master race" or Übermensch, according to Nazi doctrine.
- Arisierung ('Aryanization') – the process of making something "Aryan" through the seizure of Jewish property in favour of a non-Jewish German.
- Asoziale ('asocial people') – during the Nazi era, the term was derogatory, akin to "scum" or the ballastexistenzen ('ballast-existences' – dead weight, waste-lives) of the socially marginalized, those considered by the Nazis to be undesirables. It included the homeless, migrant workers, beggars, vagrants, large families from the lower social strata, families from the edge of town, "like gypsy" migrants, the so-called "work shy", alcoholics, prostitutes and pimps. Gypsies (as they were called by the Nazis) were considered to be "foreign race asoziale".
- Aufbruch der Nation ('a new start for the nation') – nationalist interpretation of the beginning of the First World War; it was adopted by the "National Socialist Revolution" to emphasize the overcoming of the party state and of pluralism. This was a parallel concept to the National Rising (Erhebung).
- Aufsichtsverwaltung – supervisory administration'
- Auschwitz – a town near Kraków in southern Poland that was the site of the largest Nazi concentration camps.
- ausgebombt ('bombed out') – people rendered homeless due to the Allied bombing campaign against Germany during World War II.
- Auslandsdeutsche ('Germans in foreign countries') – people of Germanic blood who spent their formative years in a German community abroad. Nazi doctrine held that such people were still entitled to the full rights of being German, especially those who remained affiliated with the Fatherland. A considerable number of them were in the United States and Argentina.
- Auslandsnachrichtendienst – intelligence service covering foreign countries. This was one of the functions of the SD as Amt VI of the RSHA.
- Auslandsorganisation (AO; 'Organization for Foreigners') – a NSDAP organization tasked to supervise Germans abroad.
- Ausrichtung ('alignment') – a favorite NS word, borrowed from military usage, for external and internal "normalization" of the movement's followers. External uniformity of dress corresponded to inner ideological alignment regarding NS goals.
- Ausrottungsmaßnahmen – extermination measures.
- Außenpolitisches Amt (APA; 'Foreign Policy Office') – a NSDAP foreign policy office overseen by Alfred Rosenberg.
- Außenstelle – also known as Außendienststelle; outstation or outpost of the SiPo and SD.
- Autobahn – The "autobahns", a freeway system planned and started by the Weimar Republic but constructed by Nazi Germany. The autobahn construction program was enthusiastically implemented by Hitler as a public works project to help fulfill his promise to reduce unemployment. The autobahn system was used as a model for the construction of the United States Interstate Highway System by President Dwight D. Eisenhower, who remarked on the efficiency of the autobahn for military transportation while in Germany as the Supreme Allied Commander of the Allied Expeditionary Force.

== B ==
- Badeanstalten "bathhouses" – gas chambers disguised as bathhouses
- Bahnschutzpolizei – railway protection police
- Bandenkampfabzeichen – "(Anti-) bandits-campaign badge": Nazi military uniform award for participating in Bandenbekämpfung operations; see below.
- Bandenbekämpfung – "bandit fighting": anti-partisan warfare. The term Banden was used instead of partisans to dehumanize those deemed to be enemies. All Jews and anyone living in a partisan-controlled area was to be killed with the assumption that they were "bandits", resulting in the mass murder of civilians.
- Bann, ban – Old German word meaning "area of command authority" (thus, ban-mile). It was revived by the Hitler Youth to designate a division of four to six Stämme (stems), or subbans, led by an HJ Bannführer. The Bann corresponded to the Untergau in the League of German Girls, and to the Jungbann in the Jungvolk.
- Bayreuther Festspiele – The "Bayreuth Festival", a festival of Wagnerian opera held since 1876 (and still held today) in Bayreuth, Germany. Because of Hitler's love of the music of Wagner, all the leading Party functionaries and their wives were expected to attend the Bayreuth Festival. Hitler said, "Anyone who does not appreciate the music of Wagner cannot understand National Socialism".
- BDM-Werk Glaube und Schönheit – "BDM Belief and Beauty Society" – A special branch of the Bund Deutscher Mädel (League of German Girls) began in January 1938 and open to girls age 17 to 21.
- Bedarfsschein – special voucher which allowed one access to otherwise scarce goods or wares.
- "Befehl ist Befehl" – "An order is an order"; Germans typically followed orders as an obligation, particularly in military contexts. This statement was frequently used as a rationale to justify mass murder.
- Befehlshaber der Ordnungspolizei (BdO) – Commander of the uniformed Order Police at regional and Wehrkreis level and in the occupied territories, subordinate to the HSSPF.
- Befehlshaber der Sicherheitspolizei und des SD (BdS) – Commander of the Security Police and Security Service in the occupied territories. Under direct RSHA control but subordinate to the HSSPF for special tasks. Analogous to the Inspekteur der Sicherheitspolizei und des SD (IdS) in the Reich. Oversaw subordinate local Kommandeur der Sicherheitspolizei und des SD (KdS). Often the commander of an Einsatzgruppe.
- SS-Begleitkommando des Führers (SS Escort Command of the Führer) – originally an eight-man SS squad assigned with protecting the life of Adolf Hitler during the early 1930s. The Begleitkommando was later expanded and became known as the Führerbegleitkommando (Führer Escort Command; FBK). It remained responsible for Hitler's personal protection until 30 April 1945.
- Bekanntmachungen – proclamations; throughout occupied Europe, German authorities posted decrees and notifications, unauthorized removal of one was punishable by death.
- Bekennende Kirche also Bekenntniskirche – "Confessing Church". The groups of Protestant churches and clergymen that resisted Nazification. Many dissenting pastors in this movement paid the ultimate sacrifice for their disagreement with the regime.
- Bergen-Belsen – concentration camp located near the German village of Bergen, nearby Hannover. Anne Frank died there.
- Berghof – Adolf Hitler's home in the Obersalzberg of the Bavarian Alps near Berchtesgaden, which he purchased in 1933.
- Berufskammern – Nazi professional organizations.
- Berufsverbrecher – "professional criminals", Nazi designation for KZ prisoners with a criminal record
- Beschwerliches Leben – synonym for Unnütze Esser "useless eaters".
- Besatzungsverwaltung – occupation administration
- Besitzbürgertum (Property-owning Bourgeoisie) – pejorative term referring to upper middle class property owning people early in the Nazi regime's existence.
- bestimmungsgemäß behandelt – treated according to orders or regulations, euphemism for mass murder
- Betreuen "look after" – imprison in a concentration camp
- Betreuungsausschuß – managing committee
- Betreuungsvertrag – support contract
- Beutegermane – Volksdeutsche
- Bevollmächtiger – plenipotentiary
- Bewachungsmannschaft – a guard detachment of the SS in a concentration camp
- Bezirksleiter – NSDAP district leaders.
- Bildungsbürgertum – educated member of the bourgeoisie
- Blechkrawatte – "tin necktie," nickname for the Knight's Cross
- Blitzkrieg – lightning war; quick army invasions aided by tanks and airplanes. A form of attack generally associated with the German armed forces during the Second World War. Blitzkrieg tactics were particularly effective in the early German campaigns against Poland, France, and the Soviet Union.
- Blockleiter – lowest official of the NSDAP, responsible for the political supervision of a (city) block, usually 40 to 60 households (also called Blockführer in some cases).
- Blockwart – see Blockleiter
- Blumenkriege ('Flower Wars') – expression used by Joseph Goebbels referring to the German diplomatic successes in both Austria and Czechoslovakia, when instead of being greeted by bullets, German soldiers were showered with flowers in jubilant displays of support.
- Blutbewußtsein – blood consciousness; pride in one's Germanic race and the act of behaving in accordance with Nazi ideals.
- Blutfahne "Blood flag" – An SA flag bloodied in the attempted Beer Hall Putsch in Munich 9 November 1923, and revered by the Nazi Party, used in ceremonies. The flag was supposedly made sacred to the Nazi cause through the blood of early NSDAP martyrs and it was used for dramatic effect and in esoteric rituals whereby Hitler 'consecrated' new party members (particularly at the Nuremberg Rallies) by holding the flag in one hand while touching the new members as they passed by him. It disappeared towards the end of the War and is presumed to have been destroyed.
- Blutorden – "Blood Order" – The medal instituted by Hitler in March 1934 and awarded to Nazis who took part in the November 1923 Beer-Hall Putsch or persons who were a member of one of its formations by January 1932 (continuous service). In 1938, members who could receive it was expanded to persons who rendered outstanding service to the Party. Further party members who lost their lives in the service of the Party could be awarded it. In June 1942, Reinhard Heydrich (posthumously) was the last to be awarded the medal. This award was one of the highest of the NSDAP and under 6,000 were given.
- Blut und Boden – "Blood and soil". Slogan adopted by the Nazis; it was originally coined by the German former Social Democrat August Winnig, cfr. his Das Reich als Republik 1918–1928, (Stuttgart and Berlin: Cotta, 1928), pg 3.
- Blut und Ehre (Blood and Honor) – Motto applied to the blades of some uniform daggers worn by the Hitlerjugend, or Hitler Youth.
- Blutschande (Blood Shame) – the German word for "incest" which was misappropriated by Hitler and the Nazis, who equated it with the defilement of German racial purity through intermarriage with other non-Germanic races.
- Blutzeuge – an NSDAP martyr
- bodengebunden – bound to the soil
- bodenständiger Kapitalismus – 'home country-orientated capitalism' or 'sedentary capitalism' – productive capitalism, i.e., industry (as opposed to unproductive 'nomadic' capitalism, i.e., financial speculation, believed by the Nazis to be dominated by the Jews) was a Nazi economic concept.
- Bombenflüchtling – bomb refugee; German city dweller sent to the countryside due to the Allied bombing attacks.
- Bombensprengkommando – bomb detonation detachments; prisoners in the SS-Baubrigaden who had to recover exploded munitions during the cleanup of bombed German cities.
- Breitspurbahn (broad-gauge railway) – a planned 3-meter (9 ft 10 1/8 in) broad-gauge railway, a personal pet project of Adolf Hitler, with double-storey coaches to run between major cities of Großdeutschland.
- Braunes Haus – The Brown House – national HQ of the NSDAP in Munich, Germany, opened 1931; Hitler purchased the Barlow Palace which was the old Italian embassy when Bavaria was an independent state.
- Braunhemden (Brownshirts) – the SA. The SA leadership obtained khaki colored shirts that were supposed to be sent to German troops stationed in African colonies prior to World War I, and thus the color brown became a symbol of the Nazi party.
- Brigadeführer "brigade leader" – an SA and SS rank, equivalent to brigadier general.
- Buchenwald – concentration camp located near Weimar, Germany
- Bücherverbrennung – book burning
- Bund Deutscher Mädel (BDM) – NSDAP "League of German Girls," the female branch of the Hitler Youth. It had three million members in 1937.
- Burschenschaft – student association (predates Nazi Party). Many of these organizations were instrumental in the adoption of Pan-Germanic anti-Semitic ideals for future SS members while they attended university.
- Bürgerbräukeller-Attentat (Beer Hall Attempt) – connotes the unsuccessful assassination attempt upon Hitler's life on 8 November 1939 in Munich.

== C ==
- Carinhall – country estate of Hermann Göring outside Berlin. Named in honor of his first wife Carin Göring (1888–1931).
- Chef der Deutschen Polizei im Reichsministerium des Innern – (Chief of the German Police in the Reich Ministry of the Interior). Title conferred on Heinrich Himmler by Hitler in June 1936. Traditionally, law enforcement in Germany had been a state matter. In this role, Himmler was nominally subordinate to Interior Minister Frick. However, the decree effectively placed the police under the national control of members of the SS.
- Chef der Sicherheitspolizei und des SD – (Chief of the Security Police and SD) or CSSD. Title first conferred on Reinhard Heydrich and after his death, Ernst Kaltenbrunner when chief of the Reichssicherheitshauptamt (Reich Security Main Office or RSHA, which included the Gestapo, SD and Kripo).
- Chef der Zivilverwaltung (CdZ) – (Chief of the Civilian Administration) Official title of the head of the Nazi occupation administration in the Grand Duchy of Luxembourg which lasted from 10 May 1940 to 10 September 1944. The office was held by Gustav Simon, Gauleiter of the neighbouring German Gau of Trier-Koblenz (since 1942 Gau Moselland).
- Chefsache (matter for the leader) – a top secret document or a matter which had to be decided by the leader (Hitler) himself.
- Chełmno (Kulmhof) – the first camp constructed solely for extermination (Vernichtungslager). Located approximately 60 kilometers from Łodz, upwards of 300,000 Jews were killed at Chełmno by German firing squads and mobile gas vans.
- Columbia-Haus (Columbia House) – infamous Gestapo prison set up immediately following Hitler's assumption of power in January 1933 which housed political opponents, Jews, and anyone deemed an enemy of the Nazi regime. Various forms of torture were employed there.
- Comintern – abbreviated version of 'Communist International' (term not unique to Nazism).
- Christlich-Sozialer Volksdienst or CSVD (Christian Social People's Service) – organization founded by the merger of the two Protestant political groups, the Christlich-soziale Reichsvereinigung (Christian Social Reich Association) and the Christlicher Volksdienst (Christian People's Service) to advocate for the Protestant religious cause. It was dissolved shortly after the Nazis seized power.
- Cyclon B – Alternative spelling of Zyklon B, trade-name of a cyanide-based insecticide used to kill over one million people in gas chambers.

== D ==
- Daseinskampf – struggle for existence. Word used in Nazi circles referring to the struggle against perceived enemies (Jews, Slavs, Communists, Roma, and others).
- Das System – "The System." Derogatory Nazi term for the Weimar Republic.
- "Denn heute gehört uns Deutschland/Und morgen die ganze Welt" – "Today, Germany belongs to us/And tomorrow the entire world", a line from the 1932 song Es zittern die morschen Knochen ("The Frail Bones Tremble") written by Hans Baumann that became the official marching song of the Reichsarbeitsdienst (Reich Labor Service) in 1935. This was loosely translated into English as Today Germany, Tomorrow the World, implying that the Nazis intended to take over the world.
- Deutsche Ansiedlungsgesellschaft – German Settlement Company
- German Workers' Party (Austria-Hungary) (DAP) – Austria-Hungary party which was the predecessor of the Austrian and Czechoslovak Deutsche Nationalsozialistische Arbeiterpartei (DNSAP), founded on 14 November 1903.
- Deutsche Arbeiterpartei (DAP) (German Workers' Party) – was a short-lived political party started in Munich and the precursor of the National Socialist German Workers' Party (Nationalsozialistische Deutsche Arbeiterpartei, NSDAP); commonly referred to in English as the Nazi Party. The DAP only lasted from January 1919 until February 1920.
- Deutsche Arbeitsfront (DAF) – The 'German Labour Front' was the Nazi's substitute organisation for trade unions, which had been outlawed on 2 May 1933.
- Deutsche Ausrüstungswerke (DAW; German Armament Works) – an armaments organization established in 1939 under SS control.
- Deutschblütig – "German-blooded, of German blood" was a legal term after the Nuremberg Laws, which certified one as a member of the German race. (See below: Fremdblütig)
- Deutsche Christen – the "de-Judaized" Christian church; those who were "Nazified". They removed the whole Old Testament from the Bible.
- Deutsche Glaubensbewegung (German Faith Movement) – neo-pagan Church formed during the Nazi era, intended to replace traditional Christian institutions.
- Deutsche Nationalsozialistische Arbeiterpartei (DNSAP) – the Austrian "German National Socialist Workers' Party".
- Deutsche Reichsbahn – German National Railway. Formed under the Weimar Republic by merging Germany's various railways, and nationalized by the Nazis in 1937. Continued to operate in East Germany until 1994.
- Deutsche Umsiedlungs-Treuhand GmbH – The German Resettlement Trust Ltd.
- Deutsche Wirtschaftsbetriebe GmbH – German Economic Enterprises Ltd.; Created by the SS and controlled by the WVHA.
- Deutscher Frauenorden (DFO) – German Women's Order. The leader was Elsbeth Zander.
- Deutscher Gruß – the "German greeting". Also known as the Hitler salute (Hitlergruß). Used when addressing Hitler, higher-ranking Party, SA or SS officers, or the Reich officials. Imposed on the Armed Forces in lieu of the military salute after the 20 July plot.
- Deutscher Luftsportverband (DLV) – German Air Sports Association, clandestine predecessor of the Luftwaffe, formed under Hermann Göring in his role of National Kommissar for aviation with former Deutsche Luft Hansa director Erhard Milch as his deputy.
- Deutscher Nationalismus – "German nationalism", the main core ideological basis of the NSDAP.
- Deutscher Nationalpreis für Kunst und Wissenschaft – German National Prize for Art and Science, a substitute/rival award to the Nobel Prizes, which the Nazis forbade Germans to accept.
- Deutscher Orden – German Order, the highest decoration of the Nazi Party; awarded only 12 times, in most cases posthumously. Cynically nicknamed the "Dead Hero Medal."
- Deutsches Jungvolk – NSDAP-controlled association for boys before they were old enough to enter the Hitler Youth at age 14.
- Deutsches Kreuz, German Cross – military decoration instituted to bridge the gap between the Iron Cross 1st Class and the Knight's Cross. Awarded in gold for valor in combat and in silver for distinguished service.
- Deutschland Erwache! – "Germany awake!" a Nazi slogan. It was used on the vexilloids of the SS when they marched in torchlight parades and in the Nuremberg Rallies:
- Deutschkunde (Study of German Culture) – formative school subject required as part of the curriculum to train German children about their importance in the world.
- Deutsches Olympiaehrenzeichen – German Olympic Games Decoration. Given in recognition of individuals who worked on organising the 11th Olympic Games in Berlin and the 4th Olympic Winter Games held in Garmisch-Partenkirchen, both in 1936. The award came in two classes and was given to both Germans and foreigners.
- Deutschlandsender (Radio Germany) – the German national radio station during the Nazi era.
- Deutschland über alles (Germany above all) – catchphrase of the Nazis and title of the German national anthem during the Nazi era. Lyrics for the song were originally written in 1841 by Hoffmann von Fallersleben to a Joseph Haydn melody as a call for German unification, but it became a Nazi rallying call for Aryan Lebensraum and German hegemony.
- Deutschnationale Volkspartei (DNVP) – German National People's Party, monarchist/nationalist conservatives who were the NSDAP's junior partner in the 1933 coalition government. Instrumental in passing the Enabling Act, but dissolved shortly thereafter.
- Der Dicke – "The fat one", a contemptuous epithet by Germans used to refer to Reichsmarschall Hermann Göring.
- "Die Juden sind unser Unglück" – A Nazi slogan: "The Jews are our misfortune." Popularised by Heinrich von Treitschke during the late 19th century, it was adopted by Der Stürmer as its motto.
- Dienststelle Ribbentrop (Ribbentrop Bureau) – duplicate foreign ministry office set up by Hitler in the spring of 1933 to rival the original German Foreign Office which he distrusted. Following an administrative reshuffling in February 1938, Hitler dissolved the office and made Joachim von Ribbentrop the Reich's Minister of Foreign Affairs.
- Dolchstoßlegende (Stab-in-the-Back Theory) – theory that the German military defeat during the First World War was the result of political intrigue by the Social Democrats, pacifist traitors, Communists and Jews back in Germany at the expense of the brave soldiers, airman, and sailors fighting abroad. It formed the backbone of Hitler's campaign against the liberal government of Weimar and was widely believed wholeheartedly by conservatives since Germany was never occupied during the fighting.
- Drang nach Osten – "Drive to the east", the historic German desire to expand eastward – especially the desire as espoused by the Nazi regime. This push or "drive" eastwards has roots in the struggles going back to the Middle Ages between Slavs and Germanic people contingent upon diplomatic shifts, war, and Christianization. Hitler made it clear in Mein Kampf that he intended to reinvigorate the Drang nach Osten once the opportunity presented itself. Hitler's conceptual understanding of the push eastwards accords that of Karl Haushofer which focused on Eastern Europe as the breadbasket needed to complement an industrialized Germany.
- Drittes Reich – Third Reich or "Third Realm". Arthur Moeller van den Bruck coined this term for his book Das Dritte Reich published in 1923. The term "Third Reich" was used by Nazi propaganda to legitimize the Nazi government as a successor to the "First Reich" (the Holy Roman Empire), 800–1806 beginning with Charlemagne, and the "Second Reich" (the German Empire, 1871–1918).
- Drittes Zeitalter – The "Three Ages" – a philosophy of history promulgated in 1923 by the German author Arthur Moeller van den Bruck in his book Das Dritte Reich, based on an update of the "Three Ages" philosophy of the medieval philosopher Joachim of Fiore, which the Nazis used to justify their rule. According to Moeller's update of the ideas of Fiore, the "First Reich" was the Age of the Father, the "Second Reich" was the Age of the Son, and there will in the future be established under a strong leader a "Third Reich" which will be the Age of the Holy Ghost in which all Germans will live in a Utopia in peace and harmony with each other.
- Durchgangslager – a transit camp

== E ==
- Eagle's Nest – see Kehlsteinhaus.
- Edelweiß – code name used for Hitler's directive by Army Group A to attack the Baku oil fields in the Caucasus.
- Eher Verlag – the Nazi Party's official publishing house made famous through its editions of Mein Kampf and operated by Max Amann.
- Ehestandsdarlehen (Marriage Loan) – loan provided by the Nazi government to encourage marriage and raise the birth rate of 'Aryan' children.
- Ehrenarier – "honorary Aryan" – some people or peoples of non-Aryan ancestry were declared Honorary Aryans because of their service to the Nazi government. Hermann Göring stated, "I will decide who is Aryan".
- Ehrendolch – lit. "honor dagger", a presentation dagger awarded for individual recognition, especially by the SS.
- Ehrenführer (Honorary Leader) – title awarded to high-ranking officials in the Nazi hierarchy which included the additional title of SS General. This special distinction was bestowed by Heinrich Himmler to a select handful of individuals to include Martin Bormann and Joachim von Ribbentrop.
- Ehrenkreuz der Deutschen Mutter – "Cross of Honor of the German Mother" – An award given to German mothers who gave birth to four or more children. Those who bore four to five children received the bronze Honor Cross, those who bore six to seven children received the silver Honor Cross, and those who bore at least eight children received the gold Honor Cross.
- Ehrenliste der Ermordeten der Bewegung – Nazi honor roll of those who fought and died for the party before it came to power in January 1933.
- Ehrenwaffe – Nazi honor weapon worn by NSDAP party leaders who qualified to carry them.
- Eiche (Oak) – code name of one of the four distinct operations to defend the Italian mainland against the Allied powers. It included the rescue of Mussolini by Otto Skorzeny and his paratroopers from captivity in the Apennines.
- Eichenlaubträger (Oak leaves dignitary/carrier) – a person awarded the Knight's Cross with oak leaves.
- Eigengesetzlichkeit – determined by inner laws as the Germanization of autonomy.
- Eichmannreferat, Judenreferat – Reich Security Head Office Referat IV B4 .
- Eignungsprüfer (Suitability Examiner) – specialists from the Main Office for Race and Settlement of the SS and other medical professionals who evaluated Polish children to assess whether or not their racial worthiness warranted being counted as Germans. This process entailed the examination of a child's general physique, eye color, hair, and the like. After evaluation, the child was placed into one of several categories; desirable for natural reproduction, tolerable, or undesirable.
- Eindeutschung (Germanization) – process of turning foreign nationals of suitable 'Aryan' or related bloodlines into Germans.
- Eindeutschungsfähigkeit – an individual's suitability for Germanization.
- Einheitspreisgeschäft – business which sold goods and commodities inside Nazi Germany in accordance with government regulated prices.
- Eingliederung (Integration) – expression for areas at least partially annexed into the Reich like Alsace-Lorraine or Luxembourg.
- Ein Volk, ein Reich, ein Führer – "One people, one nation, one leader"; one of the most-repeated slogans of the NSDAP.
- Einsatz Reinhardt alternative name for Aktion Reinhardt
- Einsatzbereitschaft (Readiness for Service) – label for the courage and willingness of individual Germans to obey and sacrifice for the Nazi cause.
- Einsatzgruppen – "Special-operation units" that were death squads under the command of the RSHA and followed the Wehrmacht on the Eastern Front to engage in the systematic killing of mostly civilians, including: Jews, communists, intellectuals, and others.
- Einsatzkommandos (Task Commandos) – special mobilized units of the Einsatzgruppen tasked with eliminating Communists, partisans, Jews, and saboteurs on the Eastern Front.
- Einsatzstab Reichsleiter Rosenberg für die Besetzen Gebiete, "Reichsleiter Rosenberg Institute for the Occupied Territories" – principal authority for the looting of artwork and cultural treasures from occupied countries.
- Einsatztrupp (Troop Task Force) – smallest of the Einsatzgruppen units responsible for liquidations in the German-occupied territories.
- Eintopf ('one pot meal') – term propagandized by the Nazis to encourage Germans to eat a one-pot meal on a weekly basis to conserve food (especially meat) for the good of the country. "Eintopf, das Opferessen des Reiches" was an expression often used which meant: "A one-pot meal, the sacrificial meal for the Reich." As part of the Eintopfsonntag campaign, from 1933 the Nazi Party made a midday Sunday eintopf obligatory on some days: in particular as part of the Winterhilfe, the first Sunday of the month from October until March.
- Einwanderungszentralstelle (EWZ; Central Immigration Office) – Organization established in 1939 and directed by Reinhard Heydrich which managed the disbursement of property and assets of exterminated or deported Jews and non-Jewish Poles to members of the Germanic people (Volksdeutsche) for their use instead.
- Eiserne Faust (Iron Fist) – right-wing political association originally based in Munich where Hitler met his erstwhile 'comrade in arms' Ernst Röhm, who was later assassinated at Hitler's order.
- Eiserne Kreuz, Iron Cross – Originally a Prussian royal military decoration for valor or combat leadership, revived by Hitler in 1939. There were three grades, the Iron Cross, Knight's Cross (Ritterkreuz) and Grand Cross (Grosskreuz); the basic grade was awarded in two degrees, 2nd and 1st Class. Holders of the 1914 Iron Cross were awarded a device (Spange) to be worn with the original decoration in lieu of a second medal.
- Endlösung – Final Solution, short for Endlösung der Judenfrage – "Final solution to the Jewish question", a Nazi euphemism for what later became known as The Holocaust.
- Endsieg – "final victory"; referring to the expected victory in World War II. Nazi leadership spoke of the "final victory" as late as March 1945.
- Entartete Kunst – degenerate art; term used as the title of an art show consisting of modern art and other "degenerate" art, which was contrasted with propagandistic Nazi art. This term also included entartete Musik or music that was considered non-German like Jazz, modern music, and any music composed by Jews.
- Enterdungsaktion – ("Exhuming action"), also called the Sonderaktion 1005 ("special action 1005") or Aktion 1005 ("Action 1005"). See above Aktion 1005.
- Entjudung (Dejudaization) – freeing things from all forms of Jewish influence, or the removal of Jews entirely.
- Entpolnisierung (Depolonization) – the clearing of racially Polish people and Jews from Poland, accomplished through the use of exploitative slave labor and mass murder.
- Entnazifizierung (Denazification) – the post-war process of removing all semblance of Nazi influence from the surviving German people. Commanders in the respective Russian, British, French, and American zones of Germany removed (to the extent possible) all former Nazis in leading positions and established 5 distinctive categories for the Nazis: (1) major offenders – those persons who committed major crimes, to be sentenced to life in prison or death; (2) activists, militarists, or profiteers – sentenced to a maximum of ten years imprisonment; (3) lesser offenders – those who deserved some form of leniency, generally sentenced to a probation period of two-three years; (4) followers – those who nominally supported the Nazi regime, subject to surveillance; (5) exonerated persons – persons who at some point actively or passively resisted the Nazis and suffered oppression under the regime.
- Erbgesundheitsgericht (Hereditary Health Court) – courts which often determined whether or not to sterilize individuals in Nazi Germany.
- Erbhöfe – hereditary; farms labelled as such were guaranteed to remain with the same family in perpetuity.
- Erbhofgesetz – the 1933 NSDAP hereditary farm law; it guaranteed family farm holdings of three hundred acres (1.2 km^{2}) or less.
- Ereignismeldung (EM) – report on activities.
- Erlass des Führers und Reichskanzlers zur Festigung deutschen Volkstums – Decree of the Führer and Reich Chancellor concerning the Strengthening of German Nationality.
- Ermächtigungsgesetz – "Law to Relieve the Distress of the People and State"; Enabling Act of March 23, 1933, which had the effect of suspending the Weimar Constitution and granting Hitler dictatorial powers.
- Ernährungsschlacht – the battle for food supplies.
- Ersatz – a substitute product. Germany did not have an easy access to some strategic materials. German scientists had to research how to produce artificial rubber (Buna), and coffee made from roasted acorns, for example. Gasified coal was manufactured to create an artificial petroleum-like product to fuel vehicles. In a military context used to refer to replacement troops, e.g., Ersatzabteilung "replacement battalion."
- Erzeugungsschlacht – Battle for Production.
- Euthanasiebefehl (Euthanasia Order) – Hitler's secret order issued in the fall of 1939 which empowered medical professionals to review a patient's overall health status to determine whether or not they would be "euthanized", a euphemism for medically assisted murder. Those who were terminally-ill, mentally handicapped or otherwise a financial burden to the German state were murdered under this order.
- Evakuierungslager (Evacuation Camp) – camps where Jews were sometimes held before being sent to any of the various concentration camps throughout the Greater Reich.

== F ==
- Fahneneid (Flag Oath) – oath of allegiance sworn to Hitler by members of the German military.
- Fahnenweihe (Consecration of the Flag) – yearly ritual during which Hitler consecrated new Party flags by touching them against the 'blood flag' from the Munich Beer-Hall Putsch.
- Fall Madagaskar (Case Madagascar) – see Madagaskarplan.
- Feindhörer (Listener to Enemy Broadcasts) – people who illegally listened to Allied and enemy broadcasts during the war.
- Feind hört mit – a propaganda campaign stressing that "The enemy is listening". It was also periodically published as "Achtung, Feind hört mit!" and "Vorsicht, Feind hört mit!" The statement is comparable to the American "Loose lips sink ships" idiom.
- Feldgendarmerie – Field Gendarmerie or Field Police, the military police units of the Wehrmacht.
- Feldherrnhalle – loggia on the Odeonsplatz in Munich; site of the violent climax of the 1923 Beer Hall Putsch. Used as the name of an SA Standarte, which eventually grew into the Panzer Corps Feldherrnhalle.
- Feme – a secret organization which practiced political assassination. Derived from what was previously a pseudo-vigilante tribunal structure active in medieval Westphalia which meted out extra-judiciary punishment. The Nazi Party old fighters romanticized this word and used it for the "self-protection" forces of the post-World War I era during which the Nazis rose to power employing forms of vigilantism.
- Festigung deutschen Volkstums (Strengthening of the German Nationality) – the deportation and mass murder of Jews and Poles across Poland and occupied Europe for the sake of making room for people of German blood.
- Festung Europa ('Fortress Europe') – all territory within German-occupied Europe and that of Germany's allies which was to be held at all costs.
- Flaggenerlass or Flaggenerlaß (Flag Order) – decree to display the Nazi flag in churches throughout Germany and Europe.
- Fliegerstaffel des Führers – Hitler's personal air transport squadron, primarily involving his personal pilot Hans Baur.
- Forschungsabteilung Judenfrage – Research Branch for the Jewish Problem.
- Frauenabteilung – Women's labor branches which promoted and supported the integration of women into the workforce.
- Frauenhilfsdienst für Wohlfahrts- und Krankenpflege – Women's Aid Service for Welfare and Health Care.
- Frauenkonzentrationslager (FKL) – Women's concentration camp
- Fraktur – a fashion of blackletter popularly associated with Nazi Germany, though the blackletter typefaces were banned by Martin Bormann in 1941 on the grounds that it was supposedly "Jewish".
- Fremdblütig (alien-blooded) – a term for persons of "non-Aryan" heritage, who were not German-blooded.
- Fremdmoral (alien morality) – a term for moral principles that do not originate with one's own "species" (Artung), and thus undermine "species-specific" (arteigene) ethics. For the "Nordic" person, for example, Christian morality was a typical alien morality.
- Fremdvölker (Foreign peoples) – descriptive terms for foreigners, or those of non-Aryan blood who were considered alien to the German population.
- Frontgemeinschaft – front line community. It was termed for the solidarity felt by the German soldiers of World War I in the trench warfare.
- Führer – leader. Adolf Hitler was called "Der Führer". Also an early SA and SS rank, later changed to Sturmführer.
- Führerbefehl – "the leader's orders"; special directives personally issued by Hitler himself. These were considered the utmost unbreakable orders in Nazi Germany, the last of which was to defend Berlin at all cost (and resulting in the suicides of the most fanatical followers).
- Führerbunker – (literally meaning "shelter [for the] leader" or "[the] Führer's shelter") was located about 8.2 metres beneath the garden of the old Reich Chancellery building at Wilhelmstraße 77, and about 120 metres north of Hitler's New Reich Chancellery building in Berlin. This underground bunker was Hitler's last FHQ. Further, it is where Hitler and his wife Eva Braun spent the last few weeks of the war and where their lives came to an end on 30 April 1945.
- Führerhauptquartiere (FHQ), a number of official headquarters especially constructed for use by the Führer.
- Führerprinzip – the "leader principle", a central tenet of Nazism and Hitler's rule, based on absolute hierarchical authority and unquestioning obedience.
- Führersonderzug – Hitler's special command train, functioning as Führer headquarters when he was on board.
- Führerstaat – the concept of Hitler's dictatorship of one-man rule.
- Führerstadt ("Führer-city") – title bestowed on five different German and Austrian cities (Berlin, Munich, Hamburg, Linz, and Nuremberg) which were to undergo major architectural reconstruction.
- SS-Führungshauptamt – SS Leadership Head Office, the administrative headquarters of the Waffen-SS.

== G ==
- Gau, pl. Gaue – NSDAP regional districts which functioned as the de facto administrative organization of Nazi Germany from 1935 to 1945.

Further subdivided into:
- Bezirke – districts

- Kreise – counties or subdistricts; smaller units of the Bezirk

- Ortsgruppen – Party branch or local branches. It took a minimum of fifteen members to be recognized

- Hauszellen – tenement cells
- Straßenzellen – street cells
- Stützpunkte – strong points

- Gauführer – very early SA and SS rank, indicating the SA or SS leader for a Gau; renamed Oberführer in 1928.
- Gauleiter – the head of a Gau or of a Reichsgau. They had to swear unconditional personal loyalty to the Führer and were directly answerable to him.
- Gau-Uschla – the level of the four-tiered Uschla system immediately below the Reichs-Uschla and immediately above the Kreis-Uschla.
- Gefrierfleischorden – ("Frozen flesh order" / frozen meat medal) Trench humor nickname for the service medal awarded for fighting on the Russian front. The decoration's official name was Die Medaille Winterschlacht Im Osten usually just shortened to Ostmedaille (East medal).
- Geheime Feldpolizei (GFP) – Secret Field Police. It was Germany's secret military police that was organised by the German high command (OKW) in July 1939 to serve with the Wehrmacht. It was mainly designed to carry out security work in the field, as the executive agent of the Abwehr.
- Geheime Staatspolizei (Gestapo) – Secret State Police. Originally the Prussian secret state police and later (as part of the SiPo, then merged into the RHSA) the official secret police of Nazi Germany. Gestapo was derived as follows: Geheime Staatspolizei.
- Gekrat – Either the Gemeinnützige Krankentransport GmbH ("Charitable Ambulance LLC") or one of its distinctive gray buses. The actual purpose of such euphemistically named "charitable ambulances" was to send sick and disabled people to the Nazi killing centers under the Action T4 eugenics program. Gekrat is an abbreviation of the company name: Gemeinnützige Krankentransport GmbH.
- Geltungsjude ("one who counts as a Jew") – A person with two Jewish grandparents who met one of four criteria in the Nuremberg Laws which caused them to be deemed a Jew rather than a Mischling of the first degree. Compare Istjude.
- Gemeinnutz geht vor Eigennutz – "The common good before the self good"; Rudolf Jung popularized it in his book Der Nationale Sozialismus, 1922, Second edition. This became Hitler's basic stance on the subordination of the economy to the national interest.
- Gemeinschaftsfremde – "Community Alien". Anyone who did not belong to the Volksgemeinschaft.
- Generalgouverneur – Governor-general. Leader of the civil administration of the Generalgouvernement.
- Generalgouvernement (General Government) – official designation for the parts of pre-war Poland that were not directly incorporated into the Großdeutsches Reich, but were otherwise placed under a totally German-ruled civil government.
- Generalgouvernement für die besetzten polnischen Gebiete – (General Government for the occupied Polish territories) – complete title for the above-mentioned Generalgouvernement from 1939 to 1941. Note that this name did not signify the existence of a military government.
- Genickschuss – "nape shoot", a method of execution.
- Genickschussanlage – "neck shooting facility", the official name of a facility used for surprise executions.
- Germania – Officially Welthauptstadt ('world-capital-city') Germania (Latin term for Germany): the name Hitler wanted for his proposed world capital city of Berlin – implying planned German dominance of much of the planet. Hitler began sketching grand buildings, memorials, and broad avenues in the 1920s. Architectural model, redevelopment plans, and structural testing by Albert Speer, forced evictions, and preliminary demolitions got underway in the mid-late 1930s. Wartime needs sidelined the project. (Germania was also the name of the second regiment of the SS-Verfügungstruppe).
- Gleichschaltung – the restructuring of German society and government into streamlined, centralized hierarchies of power, with the intention of gaining total control and co-ordination of all aspects of society. Duke University's notable historian, Claudia Koonz, described the institutionalized Gleichschaltung of the National Socialist government as comprehensive in scope and depth. For the Nazis, Gleichschaltung meant absolute unequivocal conformity and obedience. Such uniform programming of thought was part propaganda induced, partly the result of the Gestapo enforcement mechanism, and part social pressure from every direction; it was of paramount importance to act uniformly if one wanted to remain a member of the Volksgenossen.
- Goldfasanen ("golden pheasants") – derogatory term Germans used for high-ranking Nazi Party members. The term derived from the brown and red uniforms with golden insignia worn at official functions and rallies by party members that resembled the brilliant colours of a male pheasant.
- Goose step (Stechschritt) – a ceremonial marching form of many countries. The form consists of stepping forward without bending the knees. After the Nazis' use of it in their parades it was later used when referring to other totalitarian governments. Still used by some countries today.
- Goralenvolk, the Gorals of southern Poland and northern Slovakia, who were considered a separate ethnic group, said to be Slavicized ethnic Germans.
- Gottgläubiger [lit. "believer in God"], those who broke away from Christianity but kept their faith in a higher power or divine creator. The term implies someone who still believes in God, although without having any religious affiliation. Like the Communist Party in the USSR, the Nazis were not favorable toward religious institutions, but unlike the Communists, they did not promote or require atheism on the part of their membership.
- Gott mit uns "God with us" – traditional Prussian military motto, worn on the belt buckles of the Wehrmacht.
- Grand Cross – see Großkreuz des Eisernen Kreuzes
- Gröfaz – acronym for Größter Feldherr aller Zeiten ("greatest general of all time"), an initially praising, later mocking, appellation of Hitler.
- Großdeutsches Reich "Greater German Realm" – the official state name of Germany from 1943 to 1945; earlier used to refer to pre-1938 Germany (the Altreich) plus Austria and other annexed territories.
- Großgermanisches Reich "Greater Germanic Realm" – the official state name of the expanded empire that Germany's war aims set out to establish within Europe in World War II.
- Großkreuz des Eisernen Kreuzes, Grand Cross of the Iron Cross – Germany's highest military decoration. Established in two degrees, the Grand Cross and the Star of the Grand Cross; the former was awarded only once under the Third Reich, to Göring, and the latter never.
- Großraumwirtschaft – continental economic zone similar to Lebensraum.
- Großtraktor "large tractor" – code name for the Reichswehr's clandestine heavy tank design.
- Gruppenführer "group leader" – an SA and SS rank, equivalent to (US/UK) Major General.

== H ==
- Hadamar killing centre – "Euthanasia" hospital run under Aktion T4.
- Hakenkreuz 'hooked cross' – swastika.
- Halsschmerzen "sore throat" or "itchy neck" – expression to designate a reckless or glory-seeking commander, implying an obsession with winning the Knight's Cross.
- Hauptscharführer "chief squad leader" – an SS rank, the highest enlisted grade in the Allgemeine-SS, equivalent to master sergeant.
- Hauptsturmführer "chief storm leader" – an SS rank, equivalent to captain.
- Haupttruppführer "chief troop leader" – an SA and early SS rank, the highest enlisted grade in the SA, equivalent to sergeant major.
- Heer – the Army. Not specific to the Nazi era.
- Heldenklau – the mid-late war practice of enlisting army personnel of the rear to frontline duties in times of crisis, the term is a play on Kohlenklau, an anti energy squandering campaign cartoon
- Heim ins Reich – slogan standing for a policy which strove to integrate Austria and other territories with ethnic Germans into Greater Germany.
- Heimat – the 'homeland' of the German volk (i.e., The Greater German Reich). Not specific to the Nazi era.
- Heimatvertriebene – Germans expelled from their homeland after WW2. Became a political factor in the FRG, mostly aligned with the conservative and right wing parties.
- Heimtückegesetz – 1934 law establishing penalties for abuse of Nazi badges and uniforms and restricting freedom of speech.
- "Hermann Meyer" – derogatory nickname for Luftwaffe chief Hermann Göring, after his intemperate boast that "if one bomb falls on Berlin, you can call me 'Meyer'!"
- Herrenvolk/Herrenmenschen/Herrenrasse 'people/race of lords' – The master race.
- Heute Deutschland! Morgen die Welt! (Germany today! Tomorrow the world!) – popular slogan among Nazis during their push for political power.
- HIAG (German: 'Hilfsgemeinschaft auf Gegenseitigkeit der Angehörigen der ehemaligen Waffen-SS, literally "mutual help association of former Waffen-SS members") was a Waffen-SS lobby group, founded by former high-ranking Waffen-SS members in 1951. Primarily known for its historical revisionism campaigns, it played a key role in forming the perceptions of the Waffen-SS in popular culture.
- HIB-Aktion – "Into-the-Factories Campaign"; a part of the Nazi campaign to recruit factory workers.
- Hilfswerk Mutter und Kind (Mother and Child Welfare) – a welfare organization established to aid mothers and children in financial need.
- Hilfswillige (HIWIS; Helpers) – the foreign auxiliaries of the Wehrmacht, SS, and police who volunteered to assist the Nazis in various endeavors, be it manning anti-aircraft batteries, assisting in concentration camps, aiding in resettlement operations, transport and supply functions, or even participating in killing operations when assigned to the Einsatzgruppen.
- Hitlergruß (Hitler Salute) – the gesture used as a greeting in Nazi Germany, which signaled obedience to Adolf Hitler and the Nazi Party. Often accompanied by "Sieg Heil!" or "Heil Hitler!" it is one of the foremost abiding remnants of Nazi culture remaining today. While it is used in jest in the US, Canada, or England, it is actually against the law to use the gesture in Germany, the Czech Republic, Slovakia, and Austria. In other European nations like Switzerland and Sweden, it is only illegal when used to propagate Nazi ideology or the countenance thereof.
- Hitlerism is another term for Nazism used by its opponents.
- Hitlerproleten – "Hitler's proletariat"; what the Berlin working class Nazis called themselves (to distinguish themselves from the rest of the proletariat). (8)
- Hitler-Stalin-Pakt (also called the Molotov–Ribbentrop Pact and the Nazi-Soviet Pact) – treaty of non-aggression signed between Germany and the Soviet Union on 23 August 1939 which also stipulated that they (Germany and the Soviet Union) would aid the other in the event of military aggression from other powers. It also established spheres of influence between the two powers, anticipating territorial and political re-arrangements consequent a European conflict. The agreement remained in-force until the Nazis broke it by invading the Soviet Union during Operation Barbarossa on 22 June 1941.
- Hitler Youth (Hitlerjugend) – The German youth organization founded by the Nazi Party (NSDAP). Made up of the Hitlerjugend proper, for male youth ages 14–18; the younger boys' section Deutsches Jungvolk for ages 10–13; and the girls' section Bund Deutscher Mädel (BDM). From 1936 membership in the HJ proper was compulsory.
- Hoheitsabzeichen, or more specific Hoheitsadler or Reichsadler – national insignia (eagle and swastika). See Federal Coat of Arms of Germany.
- Holocaust – post-war term (unknown to the Nazis) referring to the mass murder of Jews, Sinti-Roma, Slavs, and other undesirables (euthanized Germans; homosexuals, disabled people, chronically ill, criminals, ideological dissenters, etc.) under the Nazi regime during the period 1941–1945 throughout occupied Europe. As many as 6 million European Jews were systematically killed, as were members of other persecuted groups. Through concerted killing actions by Einsatzgruppen, mobile gassing units, and fixed institutions (Nazi concentration camps), the Nazis methodically killed upwards of 11 million or more people. Specific to the murder of the Jews, the Nazi regime employed the term Endlösung, short for Endlösung der Judenfrage ('final solution to the Jewish question'), a euphemism for what later became known as The Holocaust.
- Horst-Wessel-Lied – The "Horst Wessel Song", also known as Die Fahne hoch ("The Flag Up High") from its opening line, was the anthem of the Nazi Party from 1930 to 1945. From 1933 to 1945 the Nazis made it a co-national anthem of Nazi Germany, along with the first stanza of Deutschlandlied.
- Horst-Wessel-Suppe – Landser (German army soldier) slang for rations that lack meat or fat, those ingredients March in spirit with the meal, as per the famous line of the 1st verse of the Horst-Wessel-Song.

== I ==
- Ich klage an (I accuse) – German film (1941) based on the novel, Sendung und Gewissen (Mission and Conscience) by Hellmuth Unger, which served to justify euthanasia. The film's protagonist is a man facing a decision to kill his terminally ill wife who is suffering from multiple sclerosis and is begging her doctors and husband for death. Her husband accedes to his wife's dying wish and gives her poison, after which, he is charged with murder and is brought to trial. During the trial, the husband contends that it was a mercy killing and is acquitted. Death is established as a right and a moral duty. Commissioned by none other than Joseph Goebbels, the film's ultimate goal was to encourage public support for the T4 euthanasia program, an endeavor to remove financial and societal burdens by mercifully destroying Lebensunwertes Leben (Life unworthy of life, similar to Unnütze Esser), which ultimately precipitated the Final Solution.
- IG Farben was a German chemical industry conglomerate and one of the largest corporations in the world at the time, comprising all major German chemical companies. Its name is taken from Interessen-Gemeinschaft Farbenindustrie AG (Syndicate [literally, "community of interests"] of dye-making corporations). Licensor of Zyklon B
- Illustrierter Beobachter – NSDAP national tabloid.
- IMT (International Military Tribunal) – the court set up to judge major war criminals in the Nuremberg Trials at the end of World War II. It was composed of judges from France, the Soviet Union, Great Britain, and the United States.
- Infanteriesturmabzeichen – Infantry assault medal
- Inländer – Native. Those protected as Reich citizens but with limited rights.
- innerbürtig – born within the German race
- Inschutzhaftnahme – "Taken into protective custody", in Nazi Germany a euphemism for being arrested without proper charges and trial by the SA or Gestapo, usually taken to a concentration camp.
- Inspekteur der Sicherheitspolizei und des SD (IdS) – Commander of the Security Police and Security Service at the regional Wehrkreis level. Under direct RSHA control but subordinate to the HSSPF for special tasks. Analogous to the Befehlshaber der Sicherheitspolizei und des SD in the occupied territories.
- Internationalismus (Internationalism) – according to the Nazi worldview, internationalism consists of political, economic, and social actions not linked to a specific race. Internationalism represented an ideological error to the Nazis since it was contingent upon the idea that all men are created equal, an idea they found abhorrent. Hitler decried the dangers of internationalism and its humanitarian and egalitarian nature as antithetical to the Nazi ideals and instead, fought against internationalism since for him, internationalism was a tool of Jewish bankers and Marxian Socialists, who were otherwise stateless people and for whom, their power culminated in this international abstraction. Hitler also coupled internationalism together with capitalism and democracy – asserting to the end that these ideas clashed entirely with the German national soul.
- Invalidenaktion – Operation against the sick; murder of sick concentration camp inmates
- Iron Cross – see Eiserne Kreuz
- Istjude – Being Jewish. According to the Reichsbürgergesetz of November 1935, a person was deemed Jewish who had three Jewish grandparents, regardless of his or her confession of faith or nationality

== J ==
- Jedem das Seine – "To each his own", German proverb uniquely displayed at the entrance to the Buchenwald concentration camp, in place of the Arbeit macht frei proverb at most Nazi concentration camps' entrances
- Journaille – pejorative term much used by the Nazi Party in their critique of the press of the Weimar Republic. The neologism, formed from the word journalism and the French loan-word kanaille (canaille), meaning scum, scoundrel or rabble, preceded the party.
- Judenboykott
- Juden-Christen (Jew-Christian) – a person unable to establish their Aryan/Germanic past two or three generations.
- Judenfrage
- Judenaushang – Notices identifying residences or businesses as Jewish-owned.
- Judenfrei – areas "liberated" (i.e., ethnically cleansed) from any Jewish presence. German for "free of Jews".
- Judenhäuser (Jewish Houses) – Gestapo term for buildings that were managed or administered by the Jewish Religious Federation.
- Judenkarte – Temporary food ration card for Jews, which comprised severely reduced food rations with the letter "J" stamped on it; the Nazis later printed the word "Jude" across the card.
- Judenknecht – "servant of the Jews". Gentile individuals, groups or states opposing Nazi Germany.
- Judenleihgebühr – Fee paid to the SS by German corporations for the loan of Jewish slave laborers, which equated to 0.70 ℛ︁ℳ︁ per day per person.
- Judenrampe – "Jews ramp". At death camps and concentration camps, the rail platform for unloading newly arrived (usually Jewish) internees.
- Judenrat – Jewish council. The Gestapo established Judenräte (the plural) in ghettoes to have them carry out administrative duties.
- Judenrein – areas from which any trace of a Jewish bloodline would have been completely eradicated. German for "cleansed of Jews".
- Judensau – Jew-pig, or Jew-sow. This was a long-standing German defamation against Jews that accuses them of learning the Talmudic religion from "kissing, sucking the teats, and eating the feces of a sow."
- Judenstempel – The "Jewish stamp" was an annotation affixed on German passports by Nazi authorities from 1938 that included a red "J", identifying the holder as a Jew. By July 1941 a police ordinance required this J-stamp to be included on the passport's cover.
- Judenstern – Yellow badge – a compulsory yellow Star of David badge worn on the arm or chest to identify Jews.
- Jüdische Grundspekulationsgesellschaften – Hitler's slang term for Jewish property speculation companies.
- Jüdischer Parasit
- Jud Süß (Jew Süss) – anti-Semitic pejorative used to associate the apostle Judas with Jews. It was also the title of a 1940 German film Jud Süß notorious for its anti-Semitic propaganda.
- Jugendschutzkammer (Youth Protection Chamber) – organization for representing and adjudicating the rights of young people in Nazi Germany. Representation could be made available for youths filing complaints against teachers or parents, for instance.
- Juliabkommen (July Agreement) – settlement made by German ambassador to Vienna (Franz von Papen) and Austrian chancellor Kurt Schuschnigg on 11 July 1936 to temper the foreign relations between Austria and Germany in the wake of an attempted Nazi Putsch during the summer of 1934. It was a precursor to further German imposition later by way of the Anschluss.
- 20 July Plot – failed attempt on 20 July 1944 to assassinate Hitler and overthrow the Nazi regime, by Army officers led by Oberst i. G. Claus von Stauffenberg and Generaloberst Ludwig Beck; see Operation Valkyrie.
- Jungmädel (Young Girls) – organization for girls below the age of fourteen.
- Jungvolk (Young People) – the junior division of the Hitler Youth which consisted of boys between 10 and 14 years of age.

== K ==
- Kameradschafts- und Gemeinschaftsstärkung – strengthening of comradeship and community; the Nazi Party's Gleichschaltung of social institutions.
- Kampfbund des gewerblichen Mittelstandes (Militant Association of Retailers) – organization whose purpose was the opposition of retail chain stores which were thought to be under Jewish control.
- Kampfbund für Deutsche Kultur (League of Struggle for German Culture) – organization created in 1929, directed by Alfred Rosenberg for the promotion of German culture based on Hitler's views and those of National Socialist ideologues. It promoted völkisch ideas and advocated the Nazi notion of Gleichschaltung.
- Kampfzeit – "Struggle time". The NSDAP's term for the years between 1925 and 1933 in political opposition. Much glorified after 1933 as the heroic period of the NSDAP.
- Kanzlei des Führers der NSDAP ("Chancellery of the Führer of the Nazi Party"; abbreviated as KdF). The agency served as the private chancellery of Adolf Hitler, handling different issues pertaining to matters such as complaints against party officials, appeals from party courts, official judgments, clemency petitions by NSDAP members and Hitler's personal affairs.
- Kapo (Cabo) – A privileged prisoner-work-squad leader, within the concentration camps, labor camps, and death camps; an overseer of the Sonderkommando laborers. Oftentimes criminals sent to the camps were assigned kapo duty. While on duty, they would often be issued a whip or nightstick. Generally they had a reputation for brutality.
- Katyn massacre – an incident blamed on the Nazis by Russian propaganda, which avowed that they (Russians) had discovered the mass grave of some 4,500 Polish officers. These officers were actually part of a group of 15,000 Poles who disappeared while in Soviet captivity in 1940 and whose whereabouts were unknown. The Soviet Union denied involvement in this atrocity until April 1990, when it was finally confirmed that the Polish officers had been executed during the early phase of the Nazi-Soviet collaboration. They were killed on Stalin's order.
- Keppler-Kreis (Keppler Circle) – advisory committee formed in 1932 under Hitler's prodding and through the influence of chemical manufacturer Wilhelm Keppler which consisted of leading economic figures (bankers, industrialists, and merchants) in Germany. The group was formed to provide economic advice to Hitler and the NSDAP, but Hitler manipulated the members and used these business leaders to help him seize absolute power.
- Kdf-Wagen – official name of the Type I Volkswagen Beetle, a project of the Kraft durch Freude program.
- Kehlsteinhaus – The "Eagle's Nest," Hitler's teahouse atop a mountain overlooking Obersalzberg, near Berchtesgaden. Not to be confused with the Berghof. The Kehlsteinhaus was the Nazi Party's gift to Hitler on his fiftieth birthday in 1939.
- Kinder, Küche, Kirche – "Children, Kitchen, Church" (part of Hitler's co-ordination of every aspect of life to a state-sponsored orthodoxy) – slogan delineating the proper role of women in the Nazi State. Hitler said, "National Socialism is a male movement."
- Kindersegen (Blessed with Children) – emotional term used by the Nazis to advocate the increase of the German birth rate. The expression accorded other Nazi initiatives like low-interest marriage loans, grants, additional family allowances and child subsidies. Special honors and awards were given out to mothers who contributed children to the Reich.
- Kirchenkampf ('church struggle') – the conflict between German Christians and the dissenting Confessing Church for doctrinal and ecclesiastical control of Germany's Protestant church. It is also used to connote the struggle for independence between the German state and Christian churches both Protestant and Catholic.
- Kolberg – massively funded German propaganda film designed to commemorate the Prussian war against Napoleon in 1806–1807 during which the Prussians desperately "held down the fort" and was to symbolize the German struggle as it grew more desperate. The film finally premiered on 30 January 1945 and was viewed by very few people given the Allied bombing campaigns which were destroying the infrastructure in Germany and the mounting military losses.
- Kommandantur – German for military headquarters. By metonymy, during the war it designated in occupied countries both the commands themselves, the buildings where they were located (often in castles or luxury hotels or other grand buildings), and the territories of different administrative levels under their control.
- Kommandeur der Sicherheitspolizei und des SD (KdS) – The local Commander of the Security Police and Security Service in a district of the occupied territories, reporting to the Befehlshaber der Sicherheitspolizei und des SD. Often the commander of an Einsatzkommando.
- Kommissarbefehl – Direct order by Hitler issued to all German forces in the USSR at the beginning of Operation Barbarossa, to exterminate all red army commissars on capture. This was to be done by regular Wehrmacht units, and German allies in the USSR were aware and complicit of the order.
- Kontinentalimperium – German World War II aim for achieving continental hegemony by territorial expansion into Eastern Europe. Contrast Kolonialimperium, the exclusive aim for an overseas imperial domain.
- Konzentrationslager often abbreviated KZ for concentration camp. The correct abbreviation would be KL, but KZ was chosen for the tougher sound. Concentration camps were established for the internment of those who were declared "enemies of the volk community" by the SS.
- Kraft durch Freude (KdF) – "strength through joy", state-sponsored programs intended to organize people's free time, offering cheap holidays, concerts, other leisure activities, and (unsuccessfully) a car (Kdf-Schiff, Kdf-Wagen). It was initially called Nach der Arbeit.
- Kreditschöpfungstheorie – Gregor Strasser's idea for government spending and credit creation.
- Kreisauer Kreis (Kreisau Circle) – one of the principal opposition groups named after the estate of Helmuth Moltke (leading member) made up mostly of young intellectuals and aristocrats but also included a couple of Jesuit priests, Lutheran pastors, traditional conservatives, liberals, those who still supported the former Germany monarchy, prominent landowners, former trade-union leaders and foreign diplomats. They attempted to find a respectable coup d'état which did not include Hitler's assassination since Moltke and many other members had Christian misgivings with this tactic. It was eventually infiltrated by the Gestapo and Moltke was arrested in January 1944.
- Kreisleiter – Nazi Party leader of a Kreis (county).
- Kreis-Uschla – an intermediate level of the four-tiered USCHLA system, immediately below the Gau-Uschla and immediately above the lowest-level Orts-Uschla.
- Kriegserlebnis – (myth of the) war experience.
- Kriegsmarine, "War Navy", one of the three official branches of the Wehrmacht.
- Kriegsschuldlüge (War Guilt Lie) – term used by Nazis to denounce article 231 of the Treaty of Versailles which stipulated that Germany was guilty for the First World War and demanded that Germany pay massive war reparations. Hitler especially stressed the imposition resultant from the Versaillesdiktat in his speeches and writings.
- Kriegsverdienstkreuz "War Merit Cross" – decoration for exceptional service not involving combat valor as was required for the Iron Cross. Awarded in three grades, 2nd Class, 1st Class, and Knight's Cross; with swords for frontline soldiers and without for rear-area personnel and civilians.
- Kriegsverdienstmedaille "War Merit Medal" – decoration for meritorious civilian service to the war effort, generally awarded to factory workers.
- Kriminalpolizei (Kripo) – "Criminal Police" – In Nazi Germany, it became the national Criminal Police Department for the entire Reich in July 1936. It was merged, along with the Gestapo into the Sicherheitspolizei (SiPo). Later in 1939, it was folded into the RSHA. The Kripo was also known as the "Reich Criminal Police Department", or RKPA.
- Kristallnacht or Reichskristallnacht – Crystal Night; refers to the "Night of Broken Glass", November 9–10, 1938, when mob violence against Jewish people broke out all over Germany.
- Kunstbolschewismus (Art Bolshevism) – derogatory catchword of Nazi propaganda, directed against modern and socially critical art. The term was applied by Hitler himself to painting, in particular: "The Bolshevism of art is the only possible cultural life form and spiritual expression of Bolshevism"; thus, the "officially recognized art" in Bolshevist states was represented by the "sickly outgrowths of insane and debilitated people that we have come to know since the turn of the [20th] century as Cubism and Dadaism" (Mein Kampf). Also see: Kulturbolschewismus (Cultural Bolshevism).
- Kursk – city in central Russia; name of the largest tank battle (July 5–15, 1943) of the war during which Germany lost the military initiative in the Eastern campaign.

== L ==
- Lagerbordell – "Camp bordello". A camp's on-site brothel where female forced sex workers were kept as a work-incentive for some Kapos and other favored prisoners.
- Landbund (Farmer's Association) – the most important and influential agricultural organization in Nazi Germany.
- Landsberg am Lech – small Bavarian city where the Landsberg castle (which was converted into a prison) was located. National Socialists revered this place since Hitler and his co-conspirators in the Munich Beer Hall Putsch were imprisoned together there. Not only that, Hitler also dictated his manifesto, Mein Kampf while incarcerated there. During the war there was a Nazi concentration camp on the out-skirts of town. After the war ended, the Americans and Allied authorities sent war criminals judged at Nuremberg there to serve out their time and the camp was used as a displaced person (DP) camp until the autumn of 1950.
- Landwirtschaftliche Gaufachberater – Specialist agricultural advisors
- Landwirtschaftliche Vertrauensleute (LVL) – Nazi Party agrarian agents; used to infiltrate other agricultural/husbandry/rural organizations to spread Nazi influence and doctrine.
- Landwirtschaftlicher Fachberater – expert consultant on agriculture that was assigned to every NSDAP Gau and Ort unit.
- Landwirtschaftlicher Schlepper – "agricultural hauler". Code name for the Reichswehr's clandestine light tank design; forerunner of the Panzer I.
- Lebensborn – "Fountain of Life"; an SS organization founded by Himmler and intended to increase the birth rate of "Aryans" by providing unmarried mothers shelter in nursing homes so that they would not seek (illegal) abortions.
- lebensgesetzlich ("In accordance with the laws of nature") – frequently used term by the Nazis to denote something as biologically determined.
- Lebensraum – "Living space", specifically living space for ethnic Germans and generally referring to territories to be seized in Eastern Europe; see Drang nach Osten.
- Lebensunwertes Leben ('Life unworthy of life') – people with incurable mental health problems, serious birth defects and other health issues, which in the eyes of the Nazis meant they did not deserve to live. Many people were killed under these auspices.
- Legion Condor – German Army and Air Force "volunteers" sent to fight on the Nationalist side in the Spanish Civil War.
- Leibstandarte SS Adolf Hitler (LSSAH) – Hitler's SS bodyguard regiment, originally commanded by Sepp Dietrich. By mid-1943 it had grown into a full Waffen-SS Panzer division known as "1st SS Panzer Division Leibstandarte SS Adolf Hitler".
- Leichenkommando ('corpse commando') – concentration camp inmates tasked with collecting dead bodies.
- Leichttraktor – "Light tractor". Code name for the Reichswehr's clandestine medium tank design.
- Leistungsgemeinschaft – performance community; part of the Nazi Gleichschaltung of social institutions.
- Lichtenburg – concentration camp near Kreis Torgau. It was closed down before the war and most of its inmates were sent to the concentration camps at either Buchenwald or Ravensbrück.
- Lidice – small mining town near Prague which was razed in retaliation for the assassination of Reinhard Heydrich, since members of the town 'allegedly' aided the conspirators. All 172 men and older boys in the town were shot before it was destroyed.
- Lieberose – forced labor camp just north of Cottbus in the vicinity of Brandenburg.
- liquidieren ('liquidate') – the execution of political opponents by shooting. The term liquidieren literally refers to the conversion of goods to money or the dissolution of a business or financial interests.
- Luftschutzraum, Luftschutzkeller – air-raid shelter
- Luftsportverband (League for Aeronautic Sport) – name for the group of clubs devoted to civilian flying endeavors, but ended up being used by Hermann Göring to secretly train military pilots between 1933 and 1935.
- Luftwaffe – "Air force". The Wehrmacht air arm, officially founded 26 February 1935. Today, it is the air arm of the Bundeswehr.
- Luftwaffenhelfer (Luftwaffe Helpers; Flak Helpers) – official NS term for students who manned anti-aircraft weapons, lighting, and warning systems against Allied air attacks.
- Lügenpresse – "Lying press". Pejorative term for anti-Nazi mass media.
- Luther-Deutsche ('Luther Germans') – German Christians who, generally speaking, supported the Nazi regime wholeheartedly.

== M ==
- Machtergreifung ('seizure of power') – along with Machtübernahme ('take-over power'), referred to the acquisition of full political power when Hitler assumed the role of Chancellor on 30 January 1933.
- Madagaskarplan – Madagascar Plan – a scheme devised by the Nazis in 1940 to globally alleviate the perceived Jewish problem by shipping Jews en masse to the French colony known as the island of Madagascar. Instead of sending the Jews to Palestine, which the Nazis believed belonged to the Christians and Muslims, the idea was to hold them "hostage" so to speak, on Madagascar as a bargaining chip with the Americans. Financing this operation was to be conducted using funds forcibly appropriated from Jewish businesses, homes, and any other available capital assets in Jewish control. Since the plan rested on a peace treaty between France and by proxy, Britain, it was never implemented. This plan is sometimes cited by Nazi scholars of the "functionalist" school as proof that the original intention of the Nazis was not to systematically exterminate the Jews but merely to relocate them away from continental Europe.
- Maginotlinie – Maginot Line – fortification system constructed by the French along the eastern border to Germany during the 1930s, which the Germans forces easily outflanked in 1940.
- Maidanek – extermination camp in occupied Poland, near Lublin. Formerly a Nazi labor camp, Maidanek was transformed into an extermination facility (death camp) under the administrative leadership of Odilo Globocnik. Ultimately, upwards of 1.5 million people were killed there, most by gassing.
- Maifeiertag (May Holiday) – May 1; one of the most important Nazi holidays, co-opted from socialist movements, designed to celebrate and recognize laborers.
- Mann – lowest rank in the SA and Allgemeine-SS, equivalent to private.
- Männerbund – bond of men, a distinctly masculine mystique which became an essential part of SA ideology (see male bonding).
- Marburger Rede (Marburg Speech) – a speech made on 17 June 1934 by Franz von Papen at the University of Marburg, during which he criticized the Nazi regime, called for greater freedom in Germany, and questioned the course the Nazis were taking. The speech infuriated Hitler and placed him in disfavor with the dictator.
- Marsch auf die Feldherrnhalle (March on the Feldherrnhalle) – annual memorial celebrated to commemorate the 9 November 1923 putsch by Hitler and Erich Ludendorff during which 16 National Socialists were killed. To honor them into the Nazi pantheon, their names were loudly called, a solemn affair accompanied by torchlight and rolling drums; one of many Nazi memorialization events designed to legitimize and celebrate the regime.
- Märzveilchen – "March Violets." Those who joined the NSDAP after the Reichstag elections of March 1933. Generally, the "March Violets" were assumed to join the Party for opportunistic reasons only and were held in contempt by the Old Fighters. Also called Märzgefallene or "March casualties."
- Mauthausen – small town in upper Austria which was also the location of an infamous concentration camp designed to punish or re-educate political prisoners. Conditions were abysmal and detainees were murdered through exposure and starvation, as well as extermination through labour, since it was also affiliated with the granite mining operations of the German Earth and Stone Works, an SS company. Numerous forms of human experimentation occurred on healthy prisoners at the site, and detainees unable to work were murdered under Action 14f13 at nearby killing centres.
- Mehr sein als scheinen "Be more than you appear to be." – Prussian motto applied to blades of uniform daggers worn by the Nationalpolitsche Erziehungsanstalten, or NPEA, the National Political Educational Establishment.
- Mein Kampf – "My Struggle", Adolf Hitler's autobiography and political statement.
- Meine Ehre heißt Treue "My honor is loyalty" – Motto applied to the belt buckles and the blades of uniform daggers worn by the Schutzstaffel, or SS. Based on Hitler's praise of the Berlin SS' conduct during the Stennes Revolt
- Meier (or Meyer) – pejorative and humorous nickname for Hermann Göring, who allegedly exclaimed on 9 August 1939 that he could be called Meier should any enemy planes appear over Germany. His self-assurance of air-superiority became laughable once the Allied powers established air dominance and began methodically bombing Germany during World War II.
- Metallspende des deutschen Volkes (Metal Donation of the German People) – program to collect various metals needed to support the German raw materials economy which was directed towards German armaments.
- Militärbefehlshaber – military Governor, who was the (single) head of the executive in an occupied country (when no Reichskommissar was appointed).
- Mischling – used in reference to an individual with alleged partial Jewish ancestry; some were treated as full-blooded Jews, others were subject to various restrictions.
- Mit brennender Sorge – An encyclical by Pope Pius XI warning against the Nazis.
- Mittelbau (Central Structure) – abbreviated code-name for Dora-Mittelbau or Mittelbau-Dora. It was an underground armament facility specifically designed to mass-produce the German Wunderwaffen ("wonder weapons") known as the V-1 and V-2 rockets free from Allied bombing attacks. Mittelbau was also considered a sub-camp to Buchenwald concentration camp since the majority of its forced laborers were from there. At its peak, 30,000 forced laborers worked in the facility.
- Mittelstand – Germans in the middle-class economic sphere which was made up of independent shopkeepers and craftsmen and was credited (through propaganda) with empowering the Nazis.
- Münchner Abkommen – Munich Agreement – an agreement reached between Great Britain, Germany, France, and Italy, signed in Munich on 29 September 1938, ceding the Czechoslovak Sudetenland to Germany.
- Muselmann – KZ slang, "an inmate who had resigned himself to death and lost the will to do anything to help himself survive".
- Mutterkreuz – see Ehrenkreuz der Deutschen Mutter.
- Mythus des 20. Jahrhunderts, Der (Myth of the Twentieth Century) – polemical treatise written by Nazi ideologue Alfred Rosenberg which espoused that all great culture in western civilization came from the minds of Germanic peoples but they had fallen in decline due to the negative influence of Jewish-based Christianity, Jesuits, Freemasons, and "conspirators of international Jewry". In his book, Rosenberg stressed that current and future struggles would not be ideological dogma, but blood against blood, and race against race for global dominance.

== N ==
- Nacht und Nebel – "Night and fog", code for some prisoners that were to be disposed of, leaving no traces.
- NaPoLa – common abbreviation for Nationalpolitische Erziehungsanstalt
- Nationalpolitische Erziehungsanstalt – the National Political Educational Establishment, or NPEA.
- Nationalpreis für Kunst und Wissenschaft – see Deutscher Nationalpreis für Kunst und Wissenschaft.
- Nationalsozialismus (NS) – National Socialism, i.e., Nazism.
- Nationalsozialistische Betriebszellenorganisation (NSBO) – National Socialist Factory Cell Organization (Nazi Party labor union) which had a membership of approx. 400,000 workers by January 1933.
- Nationalsozialistische Briefe – pro-labor publication launched by Gregor Strasser and edited by Joseph Goebbels.
- Nationalsozialistische Deutsche Arbeiterpartei (NSDAP) – the National Socialist German Workers' Party of Adolf Hitler: the Nazi Party.
- Nationalsozialistische Frauenschaft (NSF) – "National Socialist Women's League" headed by Gertrud Scholtz-Klink; founded in October 1931 as a fusion of several nationalist and national-socialist women's associations. It was designed to create women leaders and supervise indoctrination and training. It had 2 million members by 1938.
- National-Sozialistische Landpost – NSDAP agricultural paper started by Richard Walther Darré.
- Nationalsozialistischer Lehrerbund (NSLB) "National Socialist Teachers League" – mandatory teachers' union; in 1935 merged into the NSDDB.
- Nationalsozialistische Volkswohlfahrt (NSV) – NSDAP welfare organization founded in Berlin in September 1931. It acquired the official role in welfare and later on the racial policy of the Third Reich.
- Nationalsozialistischer Deutscher Dozentenbund (NSDDB) – National Socialist German University Lecturers League.
- Nationalsozialistischer Deutscher Studentenbund (NSDStB) – Nazi Students League, founded in 1926.
- Nationalsozialistisches Fliegerkorps (NSFK) – National Socialist Flyers Corps. Flying "club" used to mask the training of future military pilots; closely affiliated to the SA and thus a rival to Göring's DLV.
- Nationalsozialistisches Kraftfahrkorps (NSKK) – National Socialist Motor Corps. Originally the transport branch of the SA, the NSKK became the national organisation for the promotion of and training in motor vehicle operation and maintenance.
- Nazi – a short term for Nationalsozialist, i.e. a supporter of Nazism (National Socialism) or the Nazi Party. It was contrasted with Sozi, which was used to refer to a Sozialist, i.e. a supporter of Socialism or the Social Democratic Party of Germany. As an adjective, this short form is used more often in the English language than in German, in which the acronyms NS and NSDAP for the ideology and the party, respectively, were and remain the preferred form.
  - Nazism – National Socialism; the ideology of the NSDAP (generally considered to be a variant of Fascism with racist and antisemitic components)
  - denazification (Entnazifizierung) – the process by which the Allied occupiers attempted to purge post-war Germany of remnants of the Nazi regime and Nazi philosophy
  - ex-Nazis – former Nazis
- Nazismus – Nazism.
- Nebenland ('borderland') – the General Government's legally vague status as an "ancillary region" of the German Reich that was neither fully within its boundaries nor accorded any clear political designation.
- Negermusik ('Negro Music') – derogatory term for Jazz and Swing that was performed by African-American musicians. Such music became banned publicly in Nazi Germany. See also Swingjugend (swing kids).
- Die Neuordnung – "The New Order"; the formation of a hegemonial empire in Europe to ensure the supremacy of Nazi Germany and the "Nordic-Aryan master race".
- Night of the Long Knives – A/K/A "Operation Hummingbird", or more commonly used in Germany "Röhm-Putsch". It was the action that took place in Nazi Germany between June 30 and 2 July 1934 where Hitler and the SS murderously purged the ranks of the Sturmabteilung (SA).
- Nordstern – architectural project to construct a new, exclusively German-populated metropolis and naval base close to the Norwegian city of Trondheim.
- NSDAP – The formal abbreviation of the Nazi party's full name.
- NSDAP Zentralkartei – master file, containing approx. 7.2 million original and official individual German Nazi Party membership cards. Comprises two separate files. It is housed in the Berlin Document Center (BDC).
  - Ortskartei –
  - Reichskartei –
- Nur für Deutsche – "Only for Germans."
- Nuremberg Rallies – see Reichsparteitag
- Nürnberger Gesetze, Nuremberg Laws – 1935 set of decrees which deprived Jews and perceived enemies of Nazi Germany of German citizenship, nullified and outlawed marriages between Jews and non-Jews and placed strict restrictions on Jewish lives and employment.
- Nürnberger Prozesse – Nuremberg Trials, post war trials held by the allied nations in Nuremberg against the surviving Nazi leadership, part of de-Nazification

== O ==
- SS-Oberabschnitt – SS region or regional headquarters.
- Oberführer "senior leader" – an SA and SS rank, equivalent to Senior Colonel; originally called Gauführer, the SS or SA leader for a Gau.
- Obergruppenführer "senior group leader" – an SA and SS rank, equivalent to (US/UK) Lieutenant General.
- Oberkommando des Heeres (OKH) – "High Command of the Army" from 1936 to 1945.
- Oberkommando der Wehrmacht (OKW) – "High Command of the Armed Forces". The OKW replaced the War Ministry and was part of the command structure of the armed forces of Nazi Germany.
- Obersalzberg – mountainside resort overlooking Berchtesgaden in the Bavarian Alps, where Hitler purchased the Berghof in 1933, and which became the country retreat of many Nazi leaders including Martin Bormann and Hermann Göring.
- Oberscharführer "senior squad leader" – an SA and SS rank, equivalent to sergeant (SA) or staff sergeant (SS).
- Oberste SA-Führer "Supreme SA Leader" – commander of the Sturmabteilung; held by Hitler personally from September 1930.
- Oberstes Parteigericht "Supreme Party Court" – successor organization to USCHLA, 1934 to 1945.
- Oberstgruppenführer "highest group leader" – an SS rank, equivalent to (US/UK) general.
- Obersturmbannführer "senior Sturmbann (battalion) leader" – an SA and SS rank, equivalent to lieutenant colonel.
- Obersturmführer "senior Sturm (company) leader" – an SA and SS rank, equivalent to first lieutenant.
- Obertruppführer "senior troop leader" – an SA and early SS rank, equivalent to master sergeant.
- Ordensburgen – NSDAP training schools.
- Ordnertruppen – first name of the group created in the fall of 1920 by Hitler.
  - Sportabteilung – Sports section (SA); the second name of the group
  - Sturmabteilung (SA) – Storm Detachment or Battalion, abbreviated SA and usually translated as stormtroop(er)s. NSDAP paramilitary group; the third name in late 1921
- Ordnungsdienst – order service, ghetto police made up of Jewish ghetto residents.
- Ordnungspolizei (Orpo) "order police" – the regular uniformed police after their nationalization in 1936.
- Organisation Todt – civil and military engineering group eponymously named after its founder, Fritz Todt. Built the Autobahns, the Westwall (Siegfried Line), the Wolfsschanze and the Atlantic Wall; notorious for its use of conscript and slave labor.
- Ortsgruppenleiter – Nazi Party leader of a local branch.
- Orts-Uschla – the lowest level of the four-level USCHLA system.
- Ostmark ("Eastern March") – designation used for Austria as part of the Third Reich after the Anschluß. Changed to Alpen- und Donaureichsgaue in 1942 to further eradicate any notion of a separate Austrian state.

== P ==
- Pan-Germanism – Idea that all Germans should live in one country.
- Panzerkampfwagen – "Armoured fighting vehicle" (i.e. tank); military vehicle not specific to Third Reich, but listed here for its centrality to Blitzkrieg.
- Panzerfaust – "Armour fist"; an inexpensive, disposable, no-recoil anti-tank weapon of World War II and forerunner of the Soviet RPG (rocket-propelled grenade).
- Panzerschreck – An anti-tank weapon of World War II, based on the American bazooka.
- Parole der Woche – Wall newspaper used to publicise Nazi causes.
- Partei-Statistik – 1935 Nazi Party three-volume publication of membership data.
- Parteitag – (NSDAP) Party (rally) days.
- Pipel or Pipele – Among Nazi concentration camp detainees, an attractive young boy or teen who receives special favor and privileges by maintaining a relationship with another detainee of higher status, like a camp guard or a Kapo. It was largely known in the Camp system that quite a number of guards and Kapos abused their boys sexually.
- Planwirtschaft – A limited planned economy; Walther Funk promoted this idea within the Nazi party who thought genuine corporatism too stifling for business growth.
- Plutokratie – "Plutocracy"; Nazi term for the western capitalist countries, especially the US and the UK.
- Plötzensee – Notorious prison in Berlin where numerous opponents of Hitler and the Nazi regime were put to death.
- Prinzenerlass – 1940 decree by Hitler prohibiting members of Germanic royal families from working for the military.
- Project Riese – Code name for a construction project in 1943–1945, consisting of seven underground structures located in the Owl Mountains and Książ Castle in Lower Silesia.
- Putsch – German word meaning coup or revolt; has also entered the English language meaning the same.

== Q ==
- Quasselbude – Place where inconsequential talking occurs; derogatory for the parliament of the Weimar Republic
- Quatschbude – "chatter shack", derogatory term for the Weimar parliament
- Querschlag – Slanting strike, offset blow; or an element of a non-German race
- Quisling – A pejorative meaning "traitor" during World War II, commonly used as an insult directed at a citizen who collaborated with the Germans in one of the conquered nations. The term was taken from Vidkun Quisling, the pro-Nazi Norwegian leader.

== R ==
- Rampenkommando – ("ramp commando") A death camp, labor camp, or concentration camp worker – often drawn from among prisoner kapos – tasked with working at the Judenrampe to unload the rail cars and to process the newly arrived internees toward sorting, property-confiscation, and pre-execution staging areas.
- Rasse – race.
- Rassenhygiene – "Racial Hygiene" – the Nazi eugenics program – implemented to improve the Nordic Aryan master race itself to the point where it could eventually become a super race.
- Rassenschande – ('racial shame'); sexual relations between an Aryan and a "non-Aryan" (including Jews, Gypsies, blacks and other persons of non-European origin), a practice banned by the Nuremberg laws.
- Rassenwahn – racial madness.
- Rednerschule der NSDAP – National Socialist Speaker's School.
- Regierungspräsident – 'president' of a regional administration, in fact subordinate to the Nazi party's Gauleiter.
- Reich – Often translated as "Empire" or "State", perhaps the most accurate translation is "Realm".
- Reichsarbeitsdienst – State Labour Service, or RAD; 1931 formed as an auxiliary labour service, became 1935 obligatory (six-month) for all men and women between 18 and 25 years.
- Reichsbauernführer – National Farmers' Leader; title given to Richard Walther Darré.
- Reichsbevollmächtigter – Imperial Plenipotentiary in occupied territory.
- Reichsbräuteschule – Reich Bride Schools.
- Reichsbund der Deutschen Beamten
- Reichsführer-SS – title held by head of the Schutzstaffel (SS). Equal on paper to the rank of Generalfeldmarschall, but in fact more akin to Reichsmarschall from 1942 onward for Heinrich Himmler (the fourth and longest serving SS leader) amassed ever greater power during that time.
- Reichsjägerhof –
  - "Reichsjägerhof Hermann Göring" – Göring's hunting lodge near Braunschweig
  - Reichsjägerhof Rominten Göring's hunting lodge in East Prussia.
- Reichskanzlei – "Reich Chancellery" was the traditional name of the office of the German Chancellor (Reichskanzler). In 1938, Hitler assigned his favourite architect Albert Speer to build the New Reich Chancellery, requesting that the building be completed within a year and it was done. Very near the complex was the underground Vorbunker and Führerbunker; the latter where Hitler committed suicide on 30 April 1945. The New Reich Chancellery had the address No. 6 Voßstrasse, a branch-off of the Wilhelmstrasse, where the Old Reich Chancellery was located.
- Reichskonkordat (Reich Concordat) – agreement reached between the future Pope, Cardinal Eugenio Pacelli (Pius XII) and the Nazi government which was supposed to guarantee German citizens the right to practice their Catholic faith, safeguard church patronage in ecclesiastical affairs, uphold spiritual education, and protect religious property and communities throughout Germany in exchange for papal recognition and legitimization of the Nazi government. This agreement stabilized and sanctioned the Nazi regime, in a manner of speaking, while concomitantly preserving rights for the Catholic Church.
- Reichskriminalpolizeiamt – Reich Criminal Police Department or RKPA; alternative name of RSHA Amt V: Kriminalpolizei.
- Reichskommissar – Imperial Commissioner, a type of governor in occupied territory.
- Reichskonferenz – National Caucus; national caucuses held by the Austrian Deutsche Arbeiterpartei before World War I.
- Reichsleitung – national leadership; members of the NSDAP Party Directorate. They all swore personal loyalty to the Führer.
- Reichsmark (ℛ︁ℳ︁) 'Mark of the Realm' – German monetary unit. 100 Reichspfennig = 1 Reichsmark.
- Reichsmarschall – "Marshal of the Realm", the highest rank in the German armed forces during World War II (held only by Hermann Göring).
- Reichsministerium für Rüstung und Kriegsproduktion – the Reich Ministry for Armaments and War Production, founded in 1942 by merging the earlier Ministry for Weapons and Munitions with Organisation Todt; it was headed by Albert Speer.
- Reichsministerium für Volksaufklärung und Propaganda – The "Reich Ministry of Public Enlightenment and Propaganda", directed by Joseph Goebbels, established to spread Nazi propaganda.
- Reichsmordwoche, Nacht der langen Messer – "State Murder Week, Night of the Long Knives" of June–July 1934 during which Hitler assassinated hundreds of party-internal opponents, especially the SA, which was decapitated of its leadership.
- Reichsparteitage – "State Party Days", referred to in English as the Nuremberg Rallies, Nazi party rallies, held annually in Nüremberg near the date of the autumn equinox before the outbreak of war in 1939. Joseph Goebbels said of the Nuremberg Rallies, "The Führer and I consider ourselves artists and the German people are our canvas."
- Reichsprotektor – Ruling German representative in the Czech Protectorate Bohemia and Moravia.
- Reichsschrifttumskammer – the Nazi Chamber of Literature. Hanns Johst was president.
- Reichssicherheitshauptamt – Reich Security Main Office or RSHA; an SS subsidiary organization made up of 7 main departments including, the intelligence & security forces (SD and SiPo) and secret state police (Gestapo) for Germany and occupied territories; also oversaw the Einsatzgruppen. Originally led by Reinhard Heydrich.
- Reichsstatthalter – "Stadtholder of the Realm", i.e., Reich Governor; after the seizure of power in 1933, local governments were dissolved and the Gauleiters were appointed to govern the states with full powers.
- Reichstag – "Realm Diet (or Parliament)"; see Reichstag (building), Reichstag (Nazi Germany).
- Reichstrunkenbold – "Reich drunkard", derogative name secretly given to Robert Ley whose alcoholism was widely known.
- Reichs-Uschla – the highest level of the four-tiered USCHLA system, venued in Munich.
- Reichswasserleiche – "Reich water corpse", nickname given to Swedish film actress Kristina Söderbaum due to a tendency of her characters in NS propaganda films such as Jud Süss to commit suicide by drowning.
- Reichswehr "national defense" – the armed forces of the Weimar Republic, strictly limited under the Versailles Treaty. Renamed the Wehrmacht in 1935. The Reichswehr comprised:
  - the Army, Reichsheer
  - the Navy, Reichsmarine
- Reichswerke Hermann Göring – an industrial conglomerate which absorbed the captured industrial assets of German-occupied countries. By the end of 1941 the Reichswerke became the largest company in Europe, with a capital of 2.4 billion ℛ︁ℳ︁ (equivalent to 10 billion 2021 euros) and about half a million workers.
- Reinrassig – a zoological term meaning "of pure breed." Applied to human races, persons who could not prove their Aryan ancestry could be considered nicht reinrassig.
- Restpolen ("remainder of Poland") – parts of occupied Poland that were organized as the General Government in September 1939.
- Resttschechei ('remnants of the Czech lands' or 'rump Czech state') – (1) The Second Czechoslovak Republic, after the annexation of the Sudetenland in September 1938 (2) parts of occupied Czechoslovakia that were organized as the Protectorate of Bohemia and Moravia in March 1939.
- Revolution der Gesinnung – revolution of attitude; the concept that the German people would not only develop a purified race but also a new mind and spirit. It was about, in Hitler's words, "to create a new man". (5)
- Righteous Gentiles or Righteous Among the Nations – non-Jews who risked their lives during the Holocaust to save Jews from murder by the Nazis. The secular award (discussed below) by the same name given by the State of Israel has often been translated into English as "Righteous Gentile."
- Ritterkreuz, in full Ritterkreuz des Eisernen Kreuzes, "Knight's Cross of the Iron Cross" – Germany's second-highest military decoration, worn at the throat. Whereas the other grades of the Iron Cross originated during the Napoleonic Wars, the Ritterkreuz was a Third Reich creation, a replacement for various royal orders like the Pour le Merite. Successive awards were marked by the progressive addition of Eichenlaub (oakleaves), Schwerten (swords), and Brillanten (diamonds). A further degree, with Gold Oakleaves, Swords and Diamonds, was intended as a postwar honor for Germany's twelve greatest military heroes; one was awarded ahead of schedule to Stuka ace Hans-Ulrich Rudel.
- Ritterkreuzauftrag "Knight's Cross job" – soldiers' slang for a suicidal mission.
- Ritterkreuzträger – holder of the Knight's Cross.
- Röhm-Putsch – name used by the Nazis for the Night of the Long Knives, which they characterized as a foiled coup attempt by Ernst Röhm and the SA.
- Rottenführer "team leader" – an SA and SS rank, equivalent to lance-corporal.
- Rückkehr unerwünscht (abbreviated RU, "return unwanted") – a designation given to certain concentration camp prisoners who were forbidden to be released and whose death was desired. Some are listed here.

== S ==
- schaffendes und raffendes Kapital "productive and greedy capital" – a contrast between two categories of capital, of whom the latter was seen as oriented in banking and stock trading and as the domain of the Jews. The distinction was first coined by Otto Glagau in an 1874 article for the magazine Die Gartenlaube and subsequently reiterated by economist Gottfried Feder.
- Scharführer "squad leader" – an SA and SS rank, equivalent to corporal (SA) or sergeant (SS).
- Schlageter – a play written for Adolf Hitler about the Nazi martyr Leo Schlageter and performed for the Führer on his 44th birthday, April 20, 1933, to celebrate his accession to power on January 30 of that year. It was written by Nazi playwright and poet laureate Hanns Johst. In it, one of the characters, Thiemann, delivers the famous line "Whenever I hear the word 'culture', I release the safety catch on my revolver."
- Schönheit der Arbeit – Beauty of Labor program.
- SS-Schütze "rifleman" – lowest rank in the Waffen-SS, equivalent to private.
- Schutzstaffel (abbreviated SS or) – "Protection Squadron" was a major Nazi organization that grew from a small paramilitary unit that served as Hitler's personal body guard into militarily what was in practical terms the fourth branch of the Wehrmacht. It was not legally a part of the military (and therefore wore the national emblem on the left sleeve instead of over the right breast pocket). "SS" is formed from (S)chutz(s)taffel. Made up of the following branches:
  - Allgemeine SS – "General SS", general main body of the Schutzstaffel made up of the full-time administrative, security, intelligence and police branches of the SS as well as the broader part-time membership which turned out for parades, rallies and "street actions" such as Kristallnacht; also included reserve and honorary members
  - SS-Totenkopfverbände – "Death's Head Units", responsible for the concentration camps
  - SS-Verfügungstruppe – military "dispositional" (i.e. at Hitler's personal disposal) troops organized by the SS in 1934
  - Waffen-SS – "Armed SS", created in August 1940 with the amalgamation of the Verfügungstruppe, the Leibstandarte SS Adolf Hitler (LSSAH) and the combat Standarten of the Totenkopfverbände
- Das Schwarze Korps – The Black Corps; "theoretical" newspaper of the SS.
- Selbstgleichschaltung – bottom-up Gleichschaltung
- Selektion – selection of inmates for execution or slave labor at an extermination or concentration camp.
- Septemberings – Those who joined the NSDAP after the Party's breakthrough in the Reichstag elections of September 1930, but before Hitler became Chancellor in 1933.
- Siberiakentum – ('Siberiandom') the annihilation of the Polish people by their forceful assimilation into the native populations of Siberia in the intended event of their wholesale expulsion to this region.
- Sicherheitsdienst (SD) "Security Service" – the intelligence arm of the SS and later a main department of the RSHA.
- Sicherheitspolizei (SiPo) "Security Police" – the combined forces of the Gestapo and Kripo.
- Sieg Heil! – "Hail Victory!" mass exclamation when bringing the Hitlergruß (Hitler Salute).
- Sig Rune "S rune" – The letter from the runic alphabet popularized in the SS emblem and other insignia.
- Sippenhaft – the principle of families sharing the responsibility for a crime committed by one of its members.
- Sobibor – extermination camp which began operations sometime during 1942 in the south of Poland near Lublin where approximately 250,000 Jews and other deported prisoners were murdered.
- Sonderaktion 1005 – ("Special action 1005"), also called Aktion 1005 ("Action 1005") or Enterdungsaktion ("exhuming action"). See above Aktion 1005.
- Sonderbehandlung – "Special handling" or "special treatment" – a euphemism for killing.
- Sonderkraftfahrzeug (Sd.Kfz.) "special purpose motor vehicle" – all tanks and other military vehicles were assigned an Sd.Kfz. number.
- Sonderkommando – "Special commando" – originally used mainly for actual special-task troops in the Waffen SS. However, the term was quickly put to facetious use at the concentration camps, labor camps, and death camps as the euphemism for the prisoner-laborers forced to do jobs like stoking the crematoria, shaving newcomers' hair, processing seized belongings, helping unload trains, and removing corpses from gas chambers. Such laborers were told they could live in exchange for their efforts, but were regularly killed off and replaced. When working in their civilian clothes, such laborers would at times wear a color-coded armband to distinguish them from new arrivals – perhaps one color for the crew unloading the trains and herding new arrivals to the undressing area, a different color for the crew that sorted belongings, etc. They might also wear the familiar striped prisoner suits similar to those used by the slave laborers. Digits appended to the word Sonderkommando denoted prisoner-laborers attached to a specific "special action". For example, see Sonderkommando 1005 in Aktion 1005 above. Work gang leaders were called kapos.
- Sprachregelung – a special language that masked the camp conditions and the policy of extermination. It substituted words like "extermination", "killing", "liquidation" with euphemisms such as "final solution", "evacuation", "special treatment", "resettlement", "labour in the East". The language was developed to deceive victims and help SS officials and others avoid acknowledging reality.(2)
- Sprechabend – closed Nazi party meetings.
- SS or – Abbreviation and emblem of the Schutzstaffel ("Protection Squadron"). See above: Schutzstaffel.
- SS- und Polizeiführer, SS and Police Leader – these powerful officials, reporting directly to Himmler, commanded all SS and police forces within a geographic region, which together covered the Reich and the occupied territories.
  - SS- und Polizeiführer (SSPF)
  - Höher SS- und Polizeiführer (HSSPF), Higher SS and Police Leader
  - Höchste SS- und Polizeiführer (HöSSPF), Highest SS and Police Leader
- Stabschef-SA, Chief of Staff or deputy commander of the Sturmabteilung; effectively the SA commander after 1930.
- Stabsscharführer "staff squad leader" – a Waffen-SS position (not a rank): the senior NCO in a company, functionally equivalent to a US first sergeant or UK company sergeant major.
- Staffel "squadron" – the basic formation of the early SA 1925–28. Also used by the Luftwaffe and the cavalry.
- Staffelführer "squadron leader" – very early SA and SS rank. Also a rank in the NSKK, equivalent to major.
- Der Stahlhelm "The Steel helmet" – right-wing World War I veterans' organization; merged into the SA in 1933.
- Standarte – regiment-sized unit of the SA, Allgemeine-SS and Totenkopfverbände.
- Standartenführer "Standarte leader" – an SA and SS rank, equivalent to colonel.
- Ständesozialismus – corporative (or "corporate") socialism; promoted by O. W. Wagener, sometime head of the political economy section of the party organization.
- Stellvertreter des Führers "Deputy of the Führer" – title of the deputy head of the Nazi Party, held by Rudolf Hess until 1941 when he was replaced by Martin Bormann under the new title of Party Chancellor after the former's unauthorized flight to Great Britain.
- Stennes-Putsch – the revolt in 1930 and again in 1931 by the Berlin SA, commanded by Walter Stennes, in which they attacked and briefly occupied the headquarters of Gauleiter Joseph Goebbels.
- Stern zum Großkreuz des Eisernen Kreuzes, Star of the Grand Cross of the Iron Cross – Germany's ultimate military decoration, a unique honor for the greatest commander in a war. Awarded only twice, to Blücher in 1813 and to Hindenburg in 1918; the Star of 1939 was created but never awarded, and is now at West Point.
- Stoßtrupp "shock troop" – Hitler's body guard unit before the Hitlerputsch; forerunner to the SS.
- Strasser wing – named after Gregor Strasser, who led the left wing of the Nazi Party.
- Stück – "sticks" or pieces, items. The term could mean sticks of firewood or pieces of bread or cake. In the Nazi era, a Sprachregelung term for Jews and other "undesirables" meant to dehumanize such people. Example: "1000 Stück Juden in den Osten deportiert" ("1000 Jewish pieces deported to the east") – not meaning items of personal property of Jewish ownership, but rather referring to the Jews themselves as "pieces".
- Sturm – company-sized SA or SS unit.
- Sturmabteilung (SA) "Storm Detachment" or "Battalion" – the Stormtroopers, a Nazi paramilitary organisation that was instrumental in bringing Hitler to power; nicknamed the Brownshirts (Braunhemden) after their uniforms. The name originated with the Army's special assault battalions of World War I.
- Sturmbann "storm band" or "band of Stürme" – battalion-sized SA or SS unit.
- Sturmbannführer "storm band leader" – an SA and SS rank, equivalent to major.
- Der Stürmer – a weekly anti-Semitic newspaper founded by Julius Streicher known for its lurid semi-pornographic content.
- Sturmführer "storm leader" – an SA and early SS rank, equivalent to 2nd lieutenant.
- Sturmgewehr "storm gun" – the StG 44, a model of assault rifle in service from 1942 to 1945, of a class ordinarily designated "Maschinenpistole".
- Sturmhauptführer "storm chief leader" – an SA and early SS rank, equivalent to captain.
- Sturmmann "storm trooper" – an SA and SS rank, equivalent to a lance corporal.
- Sturmscharführer "storm squad leader" – the highest NCO rank in the Waffen-SS, equivalent to (US) sergeant major or (UK) RSM.
- Sudetenland – the mountainous region lying between Bohemia and Silesia whose people were German speakers. This region of the former Czechoslovakia contained over 3 million "ethnic" Germans. Difficulties in the Sudetenland were used as a pretext for annexation by Hitler shortly in the wake of the Austrian Anschluß of 1938. At the Munich Conference, British Prime Minister Neville Chamberlain (1937–1940) was duped by the Führer and pursued a policy of appeasement which recognized Germany's claims. The British Prime Minister incorrectly believed it would mean, `peace in our time', a statement he embarrassingly made before the British Press. Chamberlain was wrong about the intentions of the Nazis, and the Sudetenland became his greatest gaffe as Hitler invaded the rest of Czechoslovakia in 1939, precipitating the Second World War.
- Swingjugend – "Swing Kids" – young jazz and Swing lovers in 1930s Germany, mainly in Hamburg and Berlin, who rebelled against the regime by gathering in various venues, such as certain dance halls and cafés, to dance the jitterbug to swing music.

== T ==
- Taifun – ("Typhoon"), the code name given to the military assault of Moscow late in 1941.
- Tausendjähriges Reich – ("Thousand-Year Reich"), name popularly used by the Nazis to refer to the Nazi state. Its millennial connotations suggested that its society would last for a thousand years to come.
- Theodore Abel papers – a collection of Nazi autobiographies.
- Theresienstadt – a concentration camp approximately 35 miles (56 km) outside of Prague which was used to showcase a sanitized version of the final solution to the world, especially the Red Cross, acquired a reputation for being more "humane" than other camps. Following the Allied victory, this myth was shattered since it was frequently employed as a transit stop for Jews headed to Treblinka or Auschwitz.
- Thule-Gesellschaft – "Thule Society". One of the precursors to the Nazi Party in the early 1920s. The Nazis sought themes for their ideology in the occult and the Germanic and Nordic traditions.
- Totaleinsatz – the 400,000 Czechs conscripted for forced labor in the Reich. They were treated much better than workers from other Slavic countries.
- Totenbuch – (death book), a book found at a concentration camp which categorized incoming inmates and served to catalogue the deaths and was used to track the total number of people exterminated.
- Totenkopf "death's head" – human-skull emblem worn by members of the SS, and also by Heer (German Army) and Luftwaffe panzer crews, thought to symbolise loyalty beyond death. Not specific to the Third Reich, and previously used by Prussian cavalry units and the World War I Imperial Tank Corps. Also the specific name for both the Waffen-SS 3rd SS Panzer Division armored unit, and the Luftwaffe's Kampfgeschwader 54 medium bomber wing.
- Totenkopf-Standarten – Regiment-sized field formations of the Totenkopfverbände. They were merged into the Waffen-SS in August 1940.
- Totenkopfverbände "Death's Head Units" – The branch of the SS responsible for the concentration camps, as well as many of the Einsatzgruppen death squads. The 3rd SS Division Totenkopf was formed by men from the Totenkopfverbände.
- Totenkopf-Wachsturmbanne "Death's Head Guard Battalions" – official name of concentration camp guard units.
- Treblinka – located along the Bug River in Poland and about 75 miles (121 km) from Warsaw, Treblinka was the second Vernichtungslager (extermination camp) after Auschwitz. Upwards of 700,000 victims were murdered at Treblinka. The camp was never intended for slave labor or any other Nazi endeavor, as its sole purpose remained murder.
- Treuhänder der Arbeit – Trustees of Labour, government-appointed officials in charge of labour relations that were responsible for regulating employment contracts and maintaining industrial peace. They replaced collective bargaining and their decisions were legally binding.
- Triumph des Willens – Triumph of the Will – A famous Nazi propaganda film, directed by Leni Riefenstahl.
- Truppenamt "Troop Office" – the cover name of the Reichswehr's clandestine General Staff, illegal under the Versailles Treaty.
- Truppführer "troop leader" – an SA and early SS rank, equivalent to staff sergeant.

== U ==
- Übermensch – "over-human" or "higher human" – an idea appropriated from the work of Friedrich Nietzsche and used by Nazis to label the Germanic "Aryan" people which Nazis considered racially and culturally superior. The "master race". (Opposite of Untermensch).
- Überwachungsdienst – surveillance service of the aA to protect the organization against Konjunkturritter (financial opportunists).
- Unzuverlässige Elemente – "unreliable societal elements", Nazi term for their adversaries, such as Jews, communists, and homosexuals.
- Umschlagplatz – (lit. "changing place") place of assembly. Jewish police were told to collect Jews and bring them to this designated spot for pick up and transfer to the trains that would usually transport them to camps (labor or extermination)
- Umsiedlersonderzug – (lit. "re-settler special train") "Relocation" train – actually a one-way transport by which Jews and others were moved to camps (labor, concentration and extermination camps). The term appears on some period railroad documents (example).
- Umvolkung – ethnic dissemination.
- Untermensch – "under-human" or lower human, subhuman. Label Nazis assigned to ethnographic groups they considered racially inferior to the "Aryans". Under Nazi racial theory and practice, such "subhumans" could be exploited, abused, and murdered with impunity. (Opposite of Übermensch).
- Unternehmen Walküre "Operation Valkyrie" – Originally a Replacement Army emergency plan for maintaining order in the event of an internal revolt, it was used as a pretext by a group of officers led by Generaloberst Ludwig Beck, General d. I. Friedrich Olbricht and Oberst i. G. Claus von Stauffenberg to execute a plan to overthrow the Nazi regime following their assassination of Adolf Hitler. Launched on 20 July 1944, the assassination failed and resulted in some 5,000 executions.
- Unterscharführer "junior squad leader" – an SS rank, equivalent to corporal.
- Untersturmführer "junior storm leader" – an SS rank, equivalent to second lieutenant.
- USCHLA – arbitration committee of the NSDAP Party Directorate, an acronym for Untersuchung und Schlichtungs-Ausschuss (Inquiry and Settlement Committee).
- Unnütze Esser – (lit. "useless eaters" or "useless mouths") Similar to life unworthy of life, a designation for Jews unable to work, people with serious medical problems or disabilities, and other Untermenschen not deemed to be useful to Germany. The term was also applied to Jews, in general. It was used in the 1938 children's book Der Giftpilz by Julius Streicher, and in Philip K. Dick's book The Man in the High Castle and its television adaptation.

== V ==
- V-1 and V-2 – Vergeltungswaffen "weapons of retaliation". Used to attack Britain and other countries controlled by the Allies. The V-1 was the world's first operational cruise missile; the V-2 the first short-range ballistic missile (SRBM). Other "V-Waffe" – like a multiple-chamber supergun design project – were planned but did not become operational.
- Verbotzeit (Verbotszeit) – the time in which the NSDAP was officially banned in Bavaria, between the Beer Hall Putsch (9 November 1923) and the effective date of the lifting of the ban (16 February 1925).
- SS-Verfügungstruppe "Dispositional Troops" – the military branch of the SS, formed in 1934 under Paul Hausser. In August 1940 became the nucleus of the Waffen-SS.
- Vernichtungskrieg – War of extermination against Jews and Marxists, the war between Nazi Germany and the USSR.
- Vernichtungslager – death camps. This word was never used by the Nazis themselves.
- Volk – People, folk-community, nation, or ethnic group. It is extremely difficult to convey the full meaning of this word in English. It implies a "volk community" rooted in the soil of the heimat (homeland) with many centuries of ancestral tradition and linked together by a spiritual zeitgeist.
  - Völkerchaos – (chaos of races), the concept that there was a race of mixed people from the Mediterranean which resulted from unwanted historical change. In conjunction with the Nazi xenophobia of the Jews, this idea added another racial enemy that the German Volk had to overcome in their historic destiny to master the world.
  - Volk ohne Raum – "A people without space". A political slogan used to justify the conquest of the east.
  - Volksdeutsche – "ethnic Germans in other countries to be exploited by VOMI".
  - Volksdeutsche Mittelstelle – "VoMi – a Nazi organization to carry out Nazification of ethnic Germans in other countries."
  - Volksgenosse – "Folk comrade"
  - Völkisch movement
  - Volkskörper – variously translated as the 'ethnic body politic', 'body national' or 'national body' in an organic terminology meaning the unity of Volk and society.
- Völkischer Beobachter – (People's Observer), the official Nazi Party newspaper.
  - Deutsche Arbeiterpolitik – special labor section included in the Völkischer Beobachter paper
  - Der Angriff – (the Attack), Nazi Party labor newspaper started by Joseph Goebbels
  - Arbeitertum – Nazi Party labor newspaper.
- Volksgenossen – "National Comrades". Those who belonged to the Volksgemeinschaft.
- Volksgerichtshof – literally "People's Court", highest punitive court in the Reich, a show trial tribunal which condemned people accused of crimes against the state; verdicts were sometimes directed by Hitler himself.
- Volkshalle – a proposed gigantic domed building for Berlin as part of Albert Speer's Welthauptstadt Germania, in which Hitler planned to issue his Imperial decrees to Occupied Europe before crowds of up to 180,000 people.
- Volkswagen – "people's car". Conceived as the "Kraft durch Freude Wagen" during the mid-1930s, it did not go into production until after 1945. Perhaps the most durable and popular legacy of the Nazi era.
- Volksgemeinschaft – "People's Community" – a concept that means national solidarity; popular ethnic community; classless volk community.
- Volkssturm – (People's Army), formed in October 1944, the Volkssturm was a last ditch effort of the Nazis to call all men (aged 16 to 60 years old) to fight against the invading Allied forces in the final stages of the war. Poorly armed and inadequately equipped, the Volkssturm answered not to the Wehrmacht leadership but instead to Himmler in his capacity as the commander of the Reserve Army. Primarily engaged against the Red Army along Germany's eastern corridor, over 175,000 members of this ragtag military auxiliary were killed in action. Historian Martin Kitchen describes the establishment of the Volkssturm as a "pathetic affair." Against the advancing Russian, Canadian, American, and British forces, members of the Volkssturm (mainly young and old men, with little training) were expected to use handheld anti-tank weapons and small arms in the fight alongside the remaining Wehrmacht soldiers in repulsing the onslaught. Even if they were to prove unsuccessful, the Volkssturm was to set a shining example to future generations by fighting to the 'last man and the last bullet' for the Fatherland; as if these efforts would somehow expunge the surrender of 1918.
- Vorbunker – (the upper bunker) or "forward bunker" was located behind the large reception hall of the old Reich Chancellery in Berlin. It was meant to be a temporary air-raid shelter for Adolf Hitler and was officially called the "Reich Chancellery Air-Raid Shelter" until 1943 and the expansion of the complex with the Führerbunker.
- Vorsicht Hochspannung Lebensgefahr – Typical warning message on signs affixed to electrified fences around concentration camps, labor camps, and death camps. Essentially: "watch out high voltage life-danger."

== W ==
- Wachmänner (singular Wachmann) – "watchmen", the SS guards at death camps recruited of their own free will from Soviet POW camps and trained at Trawniki.
- Waffenamt "Weapons Office" – responsible the procurement of military equipment; WaA with a number was the standard arms inspection stamp or mark.
- Waffen-SS "Armed SS" – the combat branch of the Schutzstaffel, formed in August 1940 from earlier SS military formations; by war's end had grown into a parallel army with (nominally) 38 divisions.
- Waldkommando – "Wood-commando" prisoner-laborers assigned to work in forests, primarily to obtain firewood for heating and for burning corpses.
- Wannsee-Konferenz – a conference held on January 20, 1942, beside Lake Wannsee in Berlin in which it was decided and made official Nazi policy that the total annihilation of European Jews was the only rational means of a "Final Solution" to the Jewish question.
- Wehrbauern – soldier-peasant settlements that were to be established in the East to defend the colonies from the inroads of a Slavic insurgency.
- Wehrkraftzersetzung – a crime invented by the Nazis. It meant "negatively affecting the fighting forces". People who expressed doubts about Germany's chances of winning the war, or about Hitler's leadership, were sometimes put to death for Wehrkraftzersetzung.
- Wehrmacht "Defence force" – the name of the armed forces of Nazi Germany from 1935 to 1945. Prior to that time, the Reichswehr. Consisted of the Heer (Army), Kriegsmarine (Navy) and Luftwaffe (Air Force), but not the Waffen-SS or the police, even though both fielded combat units during the war.
- Wehrmachtsadler "Armed forces eagle" – form of the Hoheitsabzeichen worn by the Heer and Kriegsmarine, but not the Luftwaffe.
- Weibliche Kriminalpolizei – Women's branch of the national criminal police department.
- Wewelsburg – a castle near Büren in the Paderborn district of Westphalia, taken over and restored by Heinrich Himmler as an SS officers' training school and cult center.
- Die Weiße Rose – "The White Rose" – a non-violent/intellectual resistance group in Nazi Germany, consisting of students from LMU Munich and their philosophy professor. The group became known for an anonymous leaflet campaign, lasting from June 1942 until February 1943, that called for active opposition to the Nazi regime. Sentenced to execution by beheading, concentration camp or prison sentences by the Volksgerichtshof.
- Weltanschauungskrieg – war of ideologies, a final struggle between judeo-marxism and national socialism, determining the future of mankind. Thus, closely tied to Vernichtungskrieg.
- Welthauptstadt Germania – architectural plan to rebuild Berlin into a massive imperial metropolis.
- Westland – propaganda name used to denote the incorporation of the Netherlands (and in a wider context, all of the Low Countries) into a Nazi-controlled Europe.
- Wille und Macht "Will and Power" – the monthly magazine of the Hitler Youth.
- Winterhilfswerk Winterhilfe – Winter Relief Program and annual fundraising drive by the Nazi Party to support impoverished German victims of the Great Depression and of World War II. The successor to the similar program in existence during the Weimar Republic (1919–1933). Once a week, people would eat an eintopf ("one pot") meal, and donate the money they would have spent for a regular meal to the Winterhilfe.
- Wirtschaftspolitische Abteilung – 1931 WPA; A NSDAP proposed program.
- Wirtschaftliches Sofortprogramm – 1932 Economic Program; A NSDAP proposed program.
- Wirtschaftliches Aufbauprogramm – 1932 Economic Reconstruction Plan; A NSDAP proposed program.
- Wolfsangel "Wolf's hook" – runic emblem adopted by several military units of Nazi Germany.
- Wolfsschanze "Wolf's Lair" – Hitler's first World War II Eastern Front military headquarters, one of several Führer Headquarters or FHQs located in various parts of Europe. The complex, built for Operation Barbarossa (the 1941 German invasion of the Soviet Union) was located in the Masurian woods, about 8 kilometres (5.0 mi) from Rastenburg, East Prussia (N/K/A Kętrzyn, Poland). It is the location where he spent much of his time during the war following the launch of Operation Barbarossa.
- Wunderwaffe – "silver bullet" (literally, wonder weapons), referring to weapon systems developed at the end of World War II (such as the V-1 and the V-2) that were supposed to turn around Germany's desperate situation on the battlefields.
- Wu-wa – mocking colloquial shortening of wunderwaffen.

== X ==
- X-Gerät – (X equipment) radio-navigational equipment used in German bombers.
- X-Zeit – (X time) zero hour

== Y ==
- Yellow badge – a compulsory yellow Star of David badge worn on the arm or chest to identify Jews.

== Z ==
- Z-Plan (or Plan Z) was the name given to the re-equipment and expansion of the Kriegsmarine (Nazi German Navy) as ordered by Adolf Hitler on 27 January 1939. The plan called for 10 battleships, four aircraft carriers, three battlecruisers, eight heavy cruisers, 44 light cruisers, 68 destroyers and 249 U-boats by 1944 that was meant to challenge the naval power of the United Kingdom. The outbreak of World War II in September 1939 came far too early to implement the plan.
- Zählappell – (counting roll call) a roll call used at prisons and concentration camps to account for the inmate's presence and to psychologically harass them.
- Zossen – The underground bunker complex that was headquarters for both the German Wehrmacht (OKW) and (Heer) Army High Command (OKH) located approximately 20 miles west of Berlin in Zossen, Germany.
- Zoessen (slang) – a vehicle of some sort, draft cart. Widely applied to military vehicles
- Zwangsarbeiter – A forced-laborer, a slave-laborer.
- Zwangswirtschaft – Nazi-era forced-labor or compulsion economy.
- Zwischenstaatliche Vertretertagungen – interstate meetings of representatives; DNSAP and NSDAP party congresses of the early years; first one held in Salzburg, Austria.
- Zyklon B (also spelled Cyclon B) – tradename of a cyanide-based insecticide used to kill more than one million Jews, Roma, communists, and prisoners of war in Nazi gas chambers, produced by IG Farben

== List of abbreviations and acronyms ==
See the glossary above for full explanations of the terms.

- aA – agrarpolitischer Apparat, or Agrarian Policy Apparatus
- DAF – Deutsche Arbeitsfront, or German Labor Front
- DAK – Deutsche Afrika Korps, or German Africa Corps
- DAP – Deutsche Arbeiterpartei, or German Workers' Party: original name of the NSDAP
- DFO – Deutscher Frauenorden, or German Women's Order
- DJ – Deutsches Jungvolk, middle school aged boys' Hitler Youth organization
- DLV – Deutscher Luftsportverband, or German Air Sports Union
- DNSAP – Deutsche Nationalsozialistische Arbeiterpartei, the Austrian "German National Socialist Workers' Party"
- DNVP – Deutschnationale Volkspartei, German National People's Party
- FHA – Führungshauptamt or Leadership Head Office, the administrative headquarters of the Waffen-SS
- FlaK – Flug(zeug)abwehr-Kanone, "air(craft) defense cannon," anti-aircraft gun
- Gestapo – The secret state police, short for Geheime Staatspolizei
- HJ – Hitlerjugend or Hitler Youth
- KdF – Kraft durch Freude, or Strength through Joy
- Kripo – Kriminalpolizei, the national criminal investigative police
- KZ – Konzentrationslager, Nazi concentration camp
- LSR – Luftschutzraum, air-raid shelter
- LVL – Landwirtschaftliche Vertrauensleute, agrarian agents for the NSDAP
- LSSAH – Leibstandarte SS Adolf Hitler, or Adolf Hitler SS Bodyguard Regiment
- Nazi – Portmanteau for "National Socialist"
- NPEA – Nationalpolitsche Erziehungsanstalten, or National Political Educational Establishment
- NSBO – Nationalsozialistische Betriebzellenorganisation, or National Socialist Factory Cell Organization
- NSDAP – Nationalsozialistische Deutsche Arbeiterpartei, or National Socialist German Workers' Party: the Nazi Party
- NSDDB – Nationalsozialistischer Deutscher Dozentenbund, or National Socialist German University Lecturers League
- NSF – Nationalsozialistische Frauenschaft, or National Socialist Women's League
- NSFK – Nationalsozialistisches Fliegerkorps, or National Socialist Flyers Corps
- NSKK – Nationalsozialistisches Kraftfahrkorps, or National Socialist Motor Corps
- NSLB – Nationalsozialistische Lehrerbund, or National Socialist Teachers League
- NSV – Nationalsozialistische Volkswohlfahrt, or National Socialist People's Welfare
- OKH – Oberkommando des Heeres, or High Command of the Army
- OKL – Oberkommando der Luftwaffe, or High Command of the Air Force
- OKM – Oberkommando der Marine, or High Command of the Navy
- OKW – Oberkommando der Wehrmacht, or High Command of the Armed Forces
- Orpo – Ordnungspolizei, or Order Police
- PzKpfw, PzKw – Panzerkampfwagen, "armored fighting vehicle," tank
- RAD – Reichsarbeitsdienst, or State Labor Service
- RBA – National Socialist Factory Cell Division
- RFV – Reichskommissariat für die Festigung des deutschen Volkes, Reich Commissariat for the Strengthening of the German People
- RKPA – Reichskriminalpolizeiamt or Reich Criminal Police Department; alternative name of RSHA Amt V: Kriminalpolizei
- RM – Reichsmark, the monetary unit of Germany 1924–1948
- RSHA – Reichssicherheitshauptamt, Reich Security Main Office or Reich Security Head Office
- RZM – Reichszeugmeisterei, or National Material Control Office
- SA – Sturmabteilung, Storm (or Assault) Detachment, usually translated as Stormtroop(er)s: the Brownshirts
- SD – Sicherheitsdienst or Security Service of the SS
- Sd.Kfz. – Sonderkraftfahrzeug, or Special Purpose Motor Vehicle
- SiPo – Sicherheitspolizei or Security Police; made up of the Gestapo & Kripo
- SS – Schutzstaffel or Protection Squadron
- SS-TV – SS-Totenkopfverbände or Death's Head Units
- SS-VT – SS-Verfügungstruppe or Dispositional Troops
- WaA – Waffenamt or Weapons Office; used as an arms inspection stamp or mark
- WSP – Wasserschutzpolizei or Water Protection Police
- WVHA – Wirtschaftsverwaltungshauptamt, Economic-Administrative Main Office of the SS
- ZGS – Zollgrenzschutz or Customs Border Protection

== See also ==
- Glossary of German military terms
- Glossary of the Weimar Republic
- Language of Nazi concentration camps
- List of books about Nazi Germany
- List of German expressions in English
- List of Nazi Party leaders and officials
- LTI – Lingua Tertii Imperii
- Nazi mysticism
- Nazi songs
- Political decorations of the Nazi Party
