= Heinrich Schmidt (politician) =

German Nazi Party politician (1902–1960)

Heinrich Schmidt (13 December 1902 – 20 December 1960) was a German Nazi Party politician who served as the mayor of Hildesheim. He was a member of the provincial parliament of Hanover, the Landtag of Prussia and the Reichstag of Nazi Germany. After the end of the Second World War, he was sentenced to six years in prison for his activities during the Nazi period.

== Life ==
Schmidt was born in Lehrte, Germany. After attending elementary school, he attended the municipal trade school and graduated after a three-year apprenticeship. He worked as a merchant until 1927.

In 1923, Schmidt joined the German People's Party, a liberal political party in the early Weimar Republic. In 1924, he joined the National Socialist Freedom Party, a Nazi front organization. Schmidt joined the Nazi Party after the ban on it was lifted in the spring of 1925. In 1927, he also joined the Sturmabteilung, the Party's paramilitary arm. From 1927 to 1932, Schmidt served as Kreisleiter in his local district and also was a frequent public speaker for the Party in the 1930s.

Schmidt first held public office on the city council of Hamelin from 1929 to 1931. He also served as a member of the provincial parliament of Hanover. In the Nazi press, Schmidt worked for the Niedersächsischen Beobachter (Lower Saxon Observer) newspaper from 1927 to 1931 and then, from 1932, was a contributor to the magazine Arbeitertum (Community of Workers). Between 1932 and 1933, Schmidt served in the Landtag of Prussia as a member of the Nazi party for constituency 16, South-Hanover. After the dissolution of the Landtag in the autumn of 1933, Schmidt was elected to the Reichstag for electoral constituency 16 (South Hanover-Braunschweig) in November 1933.

After the Nazi seizure of power, Schmidt also became a member of the Hanoverian provincial committee and a member of various other boards in the province. On 1 April 1933, Schmidt won the election for the city council in Hildesheim and, on 24 August of that year, he took over the office of mayor. He disappeared in the fall of 1935 after a defamation case was brought against him. Andreas Dornieden, a political rival, then moved to take over his various seats. Schmidt resigned his Reichstag seat on 28 January 1936. After the end of the Second World War, he returned to Hildesheim. He was sentenced to six years in prison by the local district court for his activities during the Nazi period. He died in Bredenbeck in 1960.
