= Journaille =

German pejorative term for tabloid journalism

"Journaille" is a German pejorative term used to refer to tabloid journalism and the yellow press. The term is a neologism from the early 20th century, formed from the word journalism and the French word canaille, meaning scum, scoundrel or rabble. The term was introduced by the Austrian writer Karl Kraus in an article in his journal Die Fackel in 1902. In a later article in the same journal, Kraus wrote that the original inventor of the term was the Austrian dramaturge Alfred von Berger. The pejorative term was much used by the German Nazi Party in their attacks on the press of the Weimar Republic. Unlike many other terms used by the Nazis, the word Journaille is still used in present-day Germany, and has also established itself in the political parlance of the Netherlands and Flanders.

== See also ==
- Lying press
- Fake news

== Bibliography ==
- Adolf Josef Storfer: "Kanaille." In: Wörter und ihre Schicksale. Atlantis, Berlin / Zürich 1935
- Cornelia Schmitz-Berning: "Journaille." In: Vokabular des Nationalsozialismus. 2., expanded and updated edition [1998]. De Gruyter, Berlin 2007, ISBN 978-3-11-019549-1
