= Reinrassig =

Nazi German term

Reinrassig is a German zoological term meaning "of pure breed". In Nazi Germany, the term was applied to human races.

By the racial policy of Nazi Germany, persons who could not trace Aryan ancestry back at least four generations could be considered nicht reinrassig or impure. Depending on one's ethnicity, this status could be anything from a very minor inconvenience to life-threatening.

== See also ==
- Mischling
- Judenrein
- Glossary of the Third Reich
