= Grosstraktor =

Prototype medium tank of the Weimar Republic

Grosstraktor (Großtraktor)
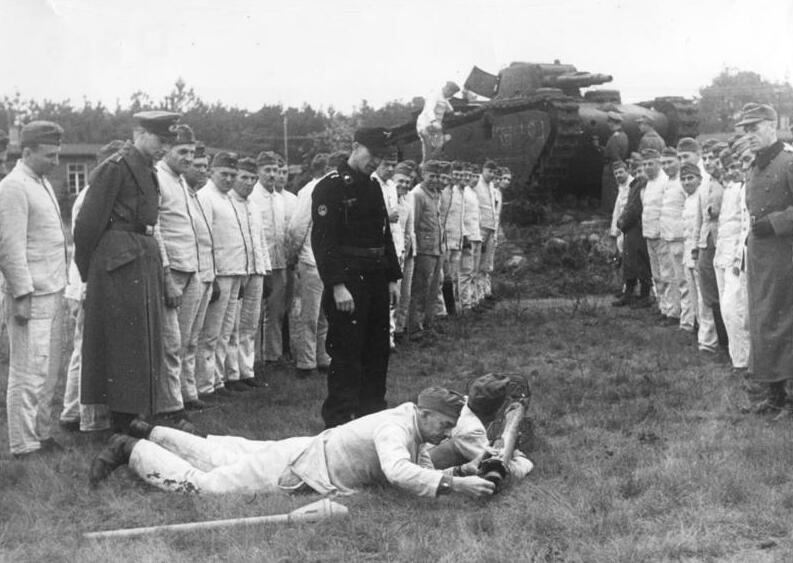
- The Grosstraktor (background) used as a target for Volkssturm anti-tank training in late 1944
- Type: Medium tank
- Place of origin: Weimar Republic

Service history
- In service: 1935
- Used by: Weimar Republic; Nazi Germany

Production history
- Designed: 1926-1928
- Manufacturer: Rheinmetall, Krupp, Daimler
- Produced: 1928
- No. built: 6

Specifications (Daimler-Benz)
- Mass: 16 tonnes (18 short tons)
- Length: 6.65 m (21 ft 10 in)
- Width: 2.78 m (9 ft 1 in)
- Height: 2.45 m (8 ft 0 in)
- Crew: 6
- Armor: Unarmored 6-14 mm mild steel
- Main armament: 75 mm KwK
- Secondary armament: 3× 7.92 mm MG (coaxial, hull and sub-turret)
- Engine: 290 hp BMW Va
- Transmission: ZF SSG 280
- Suspension: leaf springs suspension
- Fuel capacity: 400 liters (Daimler-Benz)
- Operational range: 150 km (93 mi) on-road
- Maximum speed: maximum: 40 km/h (25 mph) sustained: 25 km/h (16 mph)

Grosstraktor (German: "large tractor") was the codename given to six prototype medium tanks built (two each) by Rheinmetall-Borsig, Krupp, and Daimler-Benz, for the Weimar Republic, in violation of the Treaty of Versailles. Constructed in secret, they were tested by Reichswehr units at the Kama tank school in the Soviet Union. They were used for training and retired as monuments after the Nazi party came to power.

== Development history ==
After the First World War, Germany realized the value of tanks in warfare. In 1925, plans to design tanks for the Reichswehr were secretly initiated. The Grosstraktor was the first of the tank designs for the Reichswehr.

The Grosstraktor began life when design specifications for a tank known as the "Armeewagen 20" were created in 1926. It was to be a 15-tonne tank armed with a 7.5 cm gun in a fully rotating turret and having a length of 6 meters and a width of 2.4 meters. Contracts to design and build two chassis in soft steel were given to Daimler-Benz, Krupp, and Rheinmetall in March 1927. Krupp designed a turret for their own vehicle, while Rheinmetall designed a turret for both their own and Daimler-Benz's tanks.

Construction of the six Grosstraktor was started at a Rheinmetall shop in Unterlüß in August 1928, and was completed by the end of June 1929. They were then shipped to the secret testing ground of the Kama tank school near Kazan, Russia for trials, arriving in July 1929. There, Mk 6/380/160 track links replaced the originals.

Comparison of vehicles
Manufacturer	Daimler-Benz	Krupp	Rheinmetall
Length	6.65 m (21 ft 10 in)	6.42 m (21 ft 1 in)	6.50 m (21 ft 4 in)
Width	2.78 m (9 ft 1 in)	2.76 m (9 ft 1 in)	2.60 m (8 ft 6 in)
Height	2.45 m (8 ft 0 in)	2.47 m (8 ft 1 in)	2.51 m (8 ft 3 in)
Weight	16 t (18 short tons)	16.4 t (18.1 short tons)	16 t (18 short tons)
Suspension	leaf spring	coil spring	hydraulic
Fuel capacity	400 L (88 imp gal; 110 US gal)	370 L (81 imp gal; 98 US gal)	480 L (110 imp gal; 130 US gal)
Maximum speed	40 km/h (25 mph)	44 km/h (27 mph)	40 km/h (25 mph)

With the end of the cooperation between Germany and the Soviet, the Grosstraktors returned to Germany. The two Daimler-Benz vehicles were placed outside the headquarters of the 1st Panzer Regiment in Erfurt and the 5th Panzer Regiment at Wunsdorf while the other four vehicles went to the Panzer Gunnery SchoolPanzer Gunnery School, Putlos.

== Bibliography ==
- Jentz, Thomas L. (1997). Panzer Tracts No. 4 Panzerkampfwagen IV. Darlington, Maryland: Darlington Productions Inc. ISBN 0-96487-934-4.
