= Lying press =

German slur Lügenpresse used to discredit media, from Nazi era to modern politics

"Lying press" (German: Lügenpresse, lit. 'press of lies' [ˈlyːɡn̩ˌpʁɛsə]) is a pejorative and disparaging political epithet used largely for the printed press and the mass media at large.

== History ==
The term "Lügenpresse" has been used intermittently since the 19th century in political polemics in Germany, by a wide range of groups and movements in a variety of debates and conflicts. Isolated uses can be traced back as far as the Vormärz period. The term gained traction in the March 1848 Revolution when Catholic circles employed it to attack the rising, hostile liberal press. In the Franco-German War (1870–1871) and particularly World War I (1914–1918) German intellectuals and journalists used the term to denounce what they believed was enemy war propaganda. The Evangelischer Pressedienst of the Evangelical Church in Germany made its mission the fight against the "lying press" which it considered to be the "strongest weapon of the enemy". After the war, German-speaking Marxists such as Karl Radek and Alexander Parvus vilified "the bourgeois lying press" as part of their class struggle rhetoric.

The Nazis adopted the term in their propaganda against the Jewish, communist, and later the foreign press. In 1922 Adolf Hitler used the accusation of the "lying press" for the Marxist press. In the Mein Kampf chapter on war propaganda, he described what he saw as the extraordinary effect of enemy propaganda in the First World War. He criticized German propaganda as ineffective and called for 'better' propaganda, which, allegedly like that of the English, French or Americans, was to be oriented towards psychological effectiveness. Accusations of "lying" against domestic journalism can be found in his speeches, for example against the "social democratic press", Jewish liberals, etc.

Hermann Göring used the expression on 23 March 1933 in his speech during the debate on the Enabling Act of 1933 in the Reichstag. In the same speech he denied attacks on Jewish shops and desecrations of synagogues and Jewish cemeteries.

In December 1937, Manfred Pechau summarized parts of his dissertation ("National Socialism and German Language", Greifswald 1935) in the National Socialist monthly and listed synonyms for what he called "Jewish-Marxist lying press", including "Jewish journals". The party's official educational and speaker information material, published in 1938 by the Reich Propaganda Management of the NSDAP, includes comments on the anti-Semitic November pogroms in 1938 by foreign media as reactions of the "propaganda and lying press" which allegedly represented a new field of slander against the Reich.

In several speeches by Joseph Goebbels from the first half of 1939, "Lügenpresse" is used to characterize the media abroad, especially in the future World War II opponents, the United States, France, and Great Britain. At this point in time, the German domestic press had been "synchronized" (controlled) and a critical domestic press that the National Socialists referred to as the "Lügenpresse" no longer existed. The Nazi propaganda reacted to the false report of Max Schmeling's death with an attack on the "foreign lying press". There were also variations in this terminology; the Völkischer Beobachter, for example, referred to the "emigrant and international lying press" to deny reports about the poor health of the imprisoned Carl von Ossietzky, and in 1932, it rejected criticism of Rosenberg using the formula "Marxist lying press".

In 1942, Baldur von Schirach described the French journalist Geneviève Tabouis, who published reports on the expansion plans of National Socialism, as "the embodiment of this nifty lying press that was available to anyone who knew how to pay"; in the same context he claimed that "90 percent of all Paris newspapers" were under "Jewish influence" and that the newspaper editorial offices were staffed by "over 70 percent" Jews.

The expression was also used in speeches at carnival events that were used to bolster the party.

After the National Socialist Condor Legion bombed the city of Guernica during the Spanish Civil War and this led to appalled reactions in the world, General Franco's propaganda accused the "Jewish lying press" of disinformation, claiming that this was a press maneuver by the Bolsheviks; this happened in harmony with the Nazi propaganda.

In 1948, Walter Hagemann analyzed how the Nazi press used the accusation of the "lying press" against the foreign press. He observed that readers should be made aware of how vigilant and reliable German journalism and politics are on this point. The rejection of the Allied "horror reports" as products of the "Jewish journal" was part of this Nazi strategy.

Some Holocaust deniers use the accusatory phrase to dismiss German war crimes. For example, the Remer dispatch in the 1990s alleged that criminal proceedings against the Holocaust denier Jürgen Graf to be the "pressure of the lying press" and Jewish actors.

During the protests of 1968, left-wing students disparaged the liberal-conservative Axel Springer publishing house, notably its flagship daily Bild, as a "lying press".

== 21st century usage ==
=== Germany ===
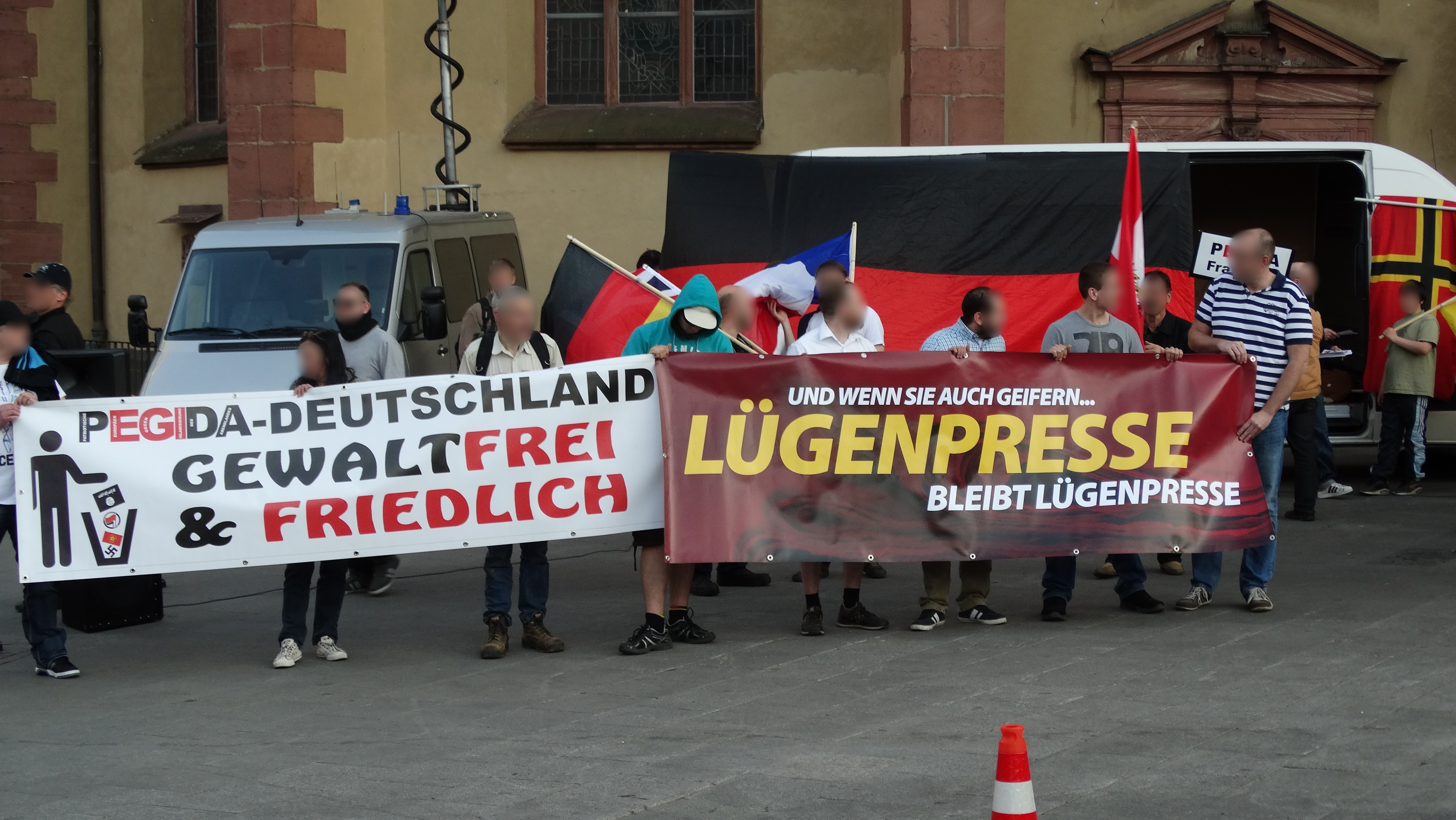
"Lügenpresse" banner seen in a Pegida demonstration

In late 2014, the term was re-popularised by the anti-Islam far-right political movement Pegida, in response to what its protesters felt was a scornful treatment by the mainstream media, as well as biased press reporting on the rising migrant influx and other immigration issues. It was chosen to be the "Un-word of the year" for 2014 by a panel of five linguists and journalists of the Gesellschaft für deutsche Sprache for "wholesale defamation" of the work of the media. President Joachim Gauck condemned the chanting of the slogan as "ahistorical nonsense", maintaining that in contrast to the Nazi and the GDR era the federal German press is not manipulative in character and "covers events mostly in a correct and balanced way".

Alternative for Germany chair Frauke Petry accused the German media of "defamatory" coverage of her party at a party congress at Hanover, but said the party executive would use the term "lying press" sparingly, preferring the milder designation "Pinocchio press". Her fellow party member Björn Höcke criticized "Lügenpresse" as too sweeping a verdict for the journalistic profession, arguing instead for the alternative, phonetically very similar term Lückenpresse 'gaps press', which would describe more accurately reporting bias.

German media detractors felt vindicated by the lack of mainstream coverage of the 2016 New Year's Eve sexual assaults in Germany. Most media outlets ignored the mass assaults by North African migrants and only started reporting on them five days later, after a wave of anger on social media made covering the attacks unavoidable. The delay in reporting on the incidents led to accusations that the authorities and the media attempted to ignore or cover up the migrant attacks to avoid criticism against the asylum and migration policy of the Merkel government. Former interior minister Hans-Peter Friedrich (CSU) criticized the media for upholding a "cartel of silence": "There's suspicion that they believe they don't have to report on such assaults, especially involving migrants and foreigners, for fear of unsettling the public." The German press codex at that time still advised against mentioning the religion or ethnicity of criminal suspects and offenders unless there was a "factual connection" to the crime.

A 2015 poll by Infratest dimap found one-fifth of Germans using the term in reference to German media, including newspapers, radio and TV, while almost three-fourths do not employ the word. 42 percent have doubts about the media's credibility, whereas 52 percent believe its coverage to be reliable on the whole. According to a representative poll by the Allensbach Institute of the same year, 39 percent of adult Germans think that there is some truth to the criticism of Pegida that the mainstream press is distorting facts and concealing crucial information from the reader; in the new states of Germany this is believed by 44 percent of the population. Another 2015 survey, by the weekly Die Zeit, found that 50 percent of respondents did not trust the media coverage on the refugee crisis, 56 percent not on the Pegida movement, 63 percent not on the European debt crisis and 66 percent not on the Russo-Ukrainian war.

=== United States ===
Prior to the 2016 presidential election, the term began to be known in American society due to its usage by some, such as neo-Nazi Richard Spencer, president of the National Policy Institute (NPI). The term was also said by two attendees of an October 2016 presidential campaign rally for Donald Trump in Cleveland, Ohio.

== See also ==
- Big lie – Propaganda technique
- Fake news
- Journaille
- Yellow journalism
- Media bias
- Politico-media complex
