= Genealogical certificate =

German official document

The genealogical certificate (Abstammungsurkunde) was a civil status certificate under German law to prove the birth of a child and it differs slightly from a birth certificate. The main purpose of the document was to determine marriage bans with adopted children. Since this had little practical significance, the genealogical certificate was abolished on January 1, 2009, by the Civil Status Law Reform Act.

Genealogical certificates were issued until December 31, 2008, by the civil registry office that had certified the birth. It contained, among other things, the child's name, sex, date of birth, place of birth, and parents' names. There are also any changes listed in a genealogical certificate that have occurred since the birth of the child, such as adoption or name changes.

Genealogical certificates were documents that reflected the actual descent of a person. For marriages a genealogical certificate was required since only it showed who the biological parents were. Since 2009, a "certified register printout of birth registration" is required upon marriage instead, which also contains information about the birth parents. This differs from the birth certificate, since the birth certificate only includes the legal parents, namely the adoptive parents.

The biological fatherhood of the alleged biological father is not assured when printed in the aforementioned genealogical certificate or "certified register of birth."
