= Arbeitertum =

Fornightly German working class newspaper

- Type: Fortnightly newspaper
- Format: Print
- Founder: Reinhold Muchow
- Editor: Reinhold Muchow
- Language: German
- Headquarters: Germany
- Country: Germany

Arbeitertum (meaning Labour in English) was a fortnightly German newspaper aimed at working class readers and edited by Reinhold Muchow. It was founded with anti-Marxist and anti-Capitalist intentions. In the early 1930s, it was sponsored by the Nazi Party and in 1933 it became the official publication of the German Labor Front. It was thus used to explain to the working class the Party's position on labour affairs, with contributions from many party leaders. Der Angriff and Der Erwerbslose were two other newspapers established by the Nazi Party for the same purpose.
