= Who is a Jew? =

Basic question about Jewish identity

"Who is a Jew?" (Hebrew: מיהו יהודי, romanized: mihu yehudi, pronounced [ˈmi(h)u je(h)uˈdi]) is a basic question about Jewish identity and considerations of Jewish self-identification. The question pertains to ideas about Jewish personhood, which have cultural, ethnic, religious, political, genealogical, and personal dimensions. Orthodox Judaism and Conservative Judaism follow Jewish law (halakha), deeming people to be Jewish if their mothers are Jewish or if they underwent a halakhic conversion. Reform Judaism and Reconstructionist Judaism accept both matrilineal and patrilineal descent as well as conversion. Karaite Judaism predominantly follows patrilineal descent as well as conversion.

Jewish identity is also commonly defined through ethnicity. Opinion polls have suggested that the majority of modern Jews see being Jewish as predominantly a matter of ancestry and culture, rather than religion.

There is controversy over Jewish identification in Israel, as it affects citizenship and personal status issues like marriage. Israel's Law of Return grants citizenship to those with a Jewish parent or grandparent, even if not religious. But the rabbinical courts use halakhic rules for marriage, requiring Orthodox conversions for those without a Jewish mother. This creates conflicts between different branches of Judaism.

The Nazis defined Jews based on their ancestry and persecuted them on a racial basis. Jews themselves have varying self-definitions, ranging from religious observance to secular ethnic identity. There is no consensus, but common themes emphasize ancestry, culture, and community belonging, even for secular Jews and converts to other religions.

== Definition of "Jew" ==
The term "Jew" lends itself to several definitions beyond simply denoting one who practices Judaism or is an Israelite. The historical Israelites and/or Hebrews, who promulgated Judaism, were not simply a heterogenous assemblage united by a common ideology; they constituted an ethnoreligious group from whom a majority of modern Jews directly descend. Because of this, an ethnic form of Jewish identity exists alongside the religious form, and the concepts of Jewish ethnicity, nationhood, and religion are strongly interrelated. Additionally, conversion allows for one who has no prior connection to the historical Jewish population to become a Jew.

In essence, the word "Jew" can be defined as a conglomerate of several different, albeit closely related, ideas:

- A Jew is one who practices the Jewish religion, Judaism. This includes both converts and those who have been members of the Jewish religion since birth.
- A Jew is one who is a direct descendant of the ancient Israelite ethnic group, and therefore is a member of the Jewish people. This includes those who may not be observantly religious, or may be irreligious altogether, and claim an overtly cultural connection, though some scholars limit the definition to descendants of Israelites who practice Judaism.
- A Jew is one who, regardless of current religious identity, is directly descended from a Jewish ancestor. Traditionally, this has only applied to matrilineal ancestry, although some Jewish groups also recognize Jewishness by way of patrilineal descent.

== Traditional interpretation and variations ==
The definition of who is a Jew varies according to whether it is being considered by Jews on the basis of religious law and tradition or self-identification, or by non-Jews for other reasons, sometimes for prejudicial purposes. Because Jewish identity can include characteristics of an ethnicity, a religion, or peoplehood, the definition depends on either traditional or newer interpretations of Jewish law and custom.

Israel's Law of Return stipulates that a Jew is someone with a Jewish mother or someone who has converted to Judaism and is not a member of another religion. The Israeli Chief Rabbinate requires documents proving the Jewishness of one’s mother, grandmother, great-grandmother, and great-great-grandmother when applying for marriage. The British Office of the Chief Rabbi (OCR) has underlined the basic principle that a child is not recognised by the OCR and other bodies as Jewish unless their mother is Jewish, or they underwent a conversion recognized by the body.

According to the simplest definition used by most Jews for self-identification, a person is a Jew by birth or becomes one through religious conversion. However, there are differences in interpretations when it comes to non-Orthodox Jewish denominations in the application of this definition, including

- Should a person with only a Jewish father be considered Jewish?
- Which conversion processes should be considered valid?
- Can one remain a Jew after converting to another religion?
- How does being unaware of having Jewish parents affect one's Jewish status?
- How is Jewish identity determined in different countries throughout the Jewish Diaspora?
- How is the claim to Israeli citizenship adjudicated in the context of the Basic Laws of Israel?

== Tannaitic Judaism ==
According to the Mishnah, the first written source for halakha, the status of the offspring of mixed marriages was determined matrilineally.

According to historian Shaye J. D. Cohen, in the Bible, the status of the offspring of mixed marriages was determined patrilineally. He brings two likely explanations for the change in Mishnaic times: first, the Mishnah may have been applying the same logic to mixed marriages as it had applied to other mixtures (kilayim). Thus, a mixed marriage is forbidden as is the union of a horse and a donkey, and in both unions the offspring are judged matrilineally. Second, the Tannaim may have been influenced by Roman law, which dictated that when a parent could not contract a legal marriage, offspring would follow the mother.

== Contemporary Judaism ==
All Jewish religious movements agree that a person may be a Jew either by birth or through conversion. According to halakha, a Jew by birth must be born to a Jewish mother. Halakha states that the acceptance of the principles and practices of Judaism does not make a person a Jew. However, those born Jewish do not lose that status because they cease to be observant Jews, even if they adopt the practices of another religion.

Reform and Reconstructionist Judaism, as movements which reject the concept of halakha, often accept a child as Jewish when only the father is Jewish, provided that the child chooses to identify as Jewish. As conversion processes differ, those performed by more liberal denominations are not accepted by more orthodox denominations.

=== Jewish by birth ===
According to halakha, to determine a person's Jewish status (Hebrew: yuhasin) one needs to consider the status of both parents. If both parents are Jewish, their child will also be considered Jewish, and the child takes the standing of the father (e.g., as a kohen). If either parent is subject to an halakhic breaking status (e.g., is a mamzer) then the child is also subject to that status. If one of the parents is not Jewish, the rule is that the child takes the standing of the mother (Kiddushin 68b, Shulchan Aruch, EH 4:19). The ruling is derived from various sources including Deuteronomy 7:1–5, Leviticus 24:10, Ezra 10:2–3. Accordingly, if the mother is Jewish, so is her child, and if she is not Jewish, neither is her child considered Jewish. In Orthodox Judaism the child of a non-Jewish mother can be considered Jewish only by a process of conversion to Judaism. The child is also freed from any special status to which the father may have been subject (e.g., being a mamzer or kohen) under Jewish law.

The Orthodox and Conservative branches of Judaism maintain that the halakhic rules (i.e. matrilineal descent) are valid and binding. Reform and Liberal Judaism do not accept the halakhic rules as binding, and most branches accept a child of one Jewish parent, whether father or mother, as Jewish if the parents raise the child as a Jew and foster a Jewish identity in the child, noting that "in the Bible the line always followed the father, including the cases of Joseph and Moses, who married into non-Israelite priestly families." (However, according to the oral tradition of Orthodox Judaism, the spouses of both Joseph and Moses converted to Judaism prior to marrying them.) The Reform movement's standard states that "for those beyond childhood claiming Jewish identity, other public acts or declarations may be added or substituted after consultation with their rabbi". Advocates of patrilineal descent point to Genesis 48:15–20 and Deuteronomy 10:15. This policy is commonly known as patrilineal descent, though "bilineal" would be more accurate.

==== Patrilineal descent ====
In 1983, the Reform Central Conference of American Rabbis passed the Resolution on Patrilineal Descent, declaring that "the child of one Jewish parent is under the presumption of Jewish descent. This presumption of the status of the offspring of any mixed marriage is to be established through appropriate and timely public and formal acts of identification with the Jewish faith and people ... Depending on circumstances, mitzvot leading toward a positive and exclusive Jewish identity will include entry into the covenant, acquisition of a Hebrew name, Torah study, Bar/Bat Mitzvah, and Kabbalat Torah (Confirmation). For those beyond childhood claiming Jewish identity, other public acts or declarations may be added or substituted after consultation with their rabbi."

Rabbi Mark Washofsky summarizes the 1983 CCAR resolution and subsequent interpretations in Reform responsa literature as follows:

- "The resolution is advisory rather than halachic in the traditional sense. It does not establish a new definition of Jewish identity, for its preamble states expressly that it means to be operative only for Reform Jews in North America, not for all Jews everywhere."
- "Jewish descent may be from either parent ...The Reform Movement presumes the child of one Jewish parent, either mother or father, as Jewish. In fact, the 1983 resolution is in one significant respect more stringent than the traditional definition of Jewish status. The child of a Jewish mother and gentile father, whom halachah regards as clearly Jewish, enjoys but a presumption of Jewish status that must be "established" by "appropriate and timely public and formal acts of identification."
- "Biology remains a crucial factor. In the determination of Jewish identity ... the child of two gentile parents is, as before, definitely a non-Jew and must undergo a formal conversion in order to become a Jew."
- "Both descent and behavior are crucial in determining Jewish status under the resolution. The Jewish status of a child of an intermarriage cannot be determined "automatically" either by biology or behavior. Both elements—descent from one Jewish parent and the performance of mitzvot that lead to a "positive and exclusive Jewish identity—must be present, and they must be present during childhood."
- "The resolution applies only to children raised exclusively as Jews ... A child raised simultaneously in Judaism and another religious tradition does not develop a "positive and exclusive" Jewish identity; therefore the presumption of Jewish status is disproved, and the resolution does not apply to that child. He or she will require conversion prior to celebrating becoming bar or bat mitzvah in the synagogue."

Waiving the need for formal conversion for anyone with at least one Jewish parent who has made affirmative acts of Jewish identity was a departure from the traditional position requiring formal conversion to Judaism for children without a Jewish mother.

The CCAR's 1983 resolution has had a mixed reception in Reform Jewish communities outside the United States. The Israel Movement for Progressive Judaism has rejected patrilineal descent and requires formal conversion for anyone not born of a Jewish mother.

Karaite Judaism believes that Jewish identity can only be transmitted by patrilineal descent, on the grounds that all descent in the Torah went according to the male line, basing this idea "on the fact that, in the Bible, tribes are given male names and that biblical characters are always referenced by their fathers' names. However, a minority of modern Karaites believe that Jewish identity requires that both parents be Jewish, and not only the father.

The divergence of views has become an issue because Orthodox and Conservative communities do not recognize a person as Jewish if only their father is Jewish. For the person to be accepted as Jewish by an Orthodox or Conservative community (for example, on an occasion of their bar or bat mitzvah or marriage), they require a formal conversion (in accordance with halakhic standards). Orthodox Judaism has a predominant position in Israel. Although Orthodox and Conservative Judaism do not recognize Jewishness through patrilineal descent, "it should also be noted, however, that in the case of a child born to a Jewish father but to a non-Jewish mother, most Orthodox rabbis will relax the stringent demands normally made of would-be converts", and the Rabbinical Assembly of the Conservative movement "agreed that 'sincere Jews by choice' should be warmly welcomed into the community".

=== Converts to Judaism ===
All mainstream forms of Judaism today are open to sincere converts, with most subgroups having a specific process for accepting converts. Not all conversions are recognised by all varieties of Judaism.

In Rabbinic Judaism, the laws of conversion are based on the classical sources of Jewish law, especially discussions in the Talmud, and the law as codified in the Shulkhan Arukh. This corpus of traditional Jewish law (halakha) is regarded as authoritative by the Orthodox and Conservative movements. The traditional halakhic requirements for conversion are instruction in the commandments, circumcision (if male), and immersion in an acceptable body of water before valid witnesses, and acceptance of the commandments before a rabbinical court. If a male is already circumcised, a drop of blood is drawn from the penis.

Orthodox authorities require that conversions be performed in accord with traditional Jewish law and recognise only those conversions in which a convert accepts and undertakes to observe Jewish law as interpreted by Orthodox rabbis. Because rabbis in the other movements do not require that converts make this commitment, Orthodox authorities do not generally accept as valid conversions performed outside the Orthodox community.

Conservative authorities likewise require that conversions be conducted according to traditional Jewish law. Conducting a conversion absent the traditional requirements of immersion in a ritual bath and circumcision for males is a violation of a Standard of the Rabbinical Assembly and grounds for expulsion. Conservative authorities generally recognize any conversion done in accord with the requirements of Jewish law, even if done outside the Conservative movement. Accordingly, Conservative rabbis may accept the validity of some conversions from other non-Orthodox movements.

The Union for Reform Judaism states that "people considering conversion are expected to study Jewish theology, rituals, history, culture and customs, and to begin incorporating Jewish practices into their lives. The length and format of the course of study will vary from rabbi to rabbi and community to community, though most now require a course in basic Judaism and individual study with a rabbi, as well as attendance at services and participation in home practice and synagogue life." Its Central Conference of American Rabbis recommends that three rabbis be present for the conversion ceremony. The Rabbinical Court of the Israel Movement for Progressive Judaism requires an average of a year of study to become conversant in Jewish life and tradition. Following this, converts are required to immerse in a ritual bath, be circumcised if male, and accept the commandments before the rabbinical court.

Although an infant conversion might be accepted in some circumstances (such as in the case of adopted children or children whose parents convert), children who convert would typically be asked if they want to remain Jewish after reaching religious adulthood – which is 12 years of age for a girl and 13 for a boy, as required by Jewish law.

Karaite Judaism does not accept the oral legal traditions of Rabbinic Judaism. It has different requirements for conversion and refrained from accepting any converts until recently. Traditionally non-proselytizing, on August 1, 2007, the Karaites reportedly converted their first new members in 500 years. At a ceremony in their Northern California synagogue, ten adults and four minors swore fealty to Judaism after completing a year of study. This conversion came 15 years after the Karaite Council of Sages reversed its centuries-old ban on accepting converts.

Syrian Jewish communities do not normally carry out conversions, particularly where the conversion is suspected of being for the sake of marriage. Nor do they accept such converts from other communities, or the children of mixed marriages or marriages involving such converts.

=== Jews who have practiced another religion ===
In general, Orthodox Judaism considers individuals born of Jewish mothers to be Jewish, even if they convert to or are raised in another religion. Reform Judaism views Jews who convert to or are raised in another religion as non-Jews. For example "... anyone who claims that Jesus is their savior is no longer a Jew ..." [Contemporary American Reform Responsa, #68].

Historically, a Jew who has been declared to be a heretic (Hebrew: מין, romanized: min) or Christian (Hebrew: נוצרי, romanized: notzri, meaning "Nazarene") may have had a cherem (similar to excommunication) placed on him or her; but the practice of communal and religious exclusion does not affect their status of Jewish birth. Judaism also views as Jewish those who involuntarily convert from Judaism to another religion (Hebrew: anusim, אנוסים, meaning "forced ones"), and their matrilineal descendants are likewise considered to be Jewish.

Judaism has a category for those who are Jewish but who do not practice or who do not accept the tenets of Judaism, whether or not they have converted to another religion. The traditional view regarding these individuals, known as Meshumadim (Hebrew: משומדים), is that they are Jewish; however, there is much debate in the rabbinic literature regarding their status vis-a-vis the application of Jewish law and their participation in Jewish ritual, but not to their status as Jews.

A Jew who leaves Judaism is free to return to the religion at any time. In general, no formal ceremony or declaration is required to return to Jewish practices. All movements of Judaism welcome the return to Judaism of those who have left, or been raised in another religion. When returning to Judaism, these individuals would be expected to abandon their previous practices and adopt Jewish customs.

The same rules in principle apply to the matrilineal descendants of such persons, though some rabbinical authorities may require stricter proof of Jewish descent than others. Whether such persons are required to undergo a full formal conversion depends on the community and their individual circumstances. For example, a male who has had a brit milah, who has a general understanding of Judaism, but who has been raised in a secular home might not be required to undergo ritual conversion. However, a male who has not had a brit milah, a male or female who has converted to or been brought up in another religion, or an individual raised in a completely secular home without any Jewish education, in most communities, may be required to undergo a full ritual conversion. For full participation in the community (for example, to marry with the participation of a rabbi), they may be required to display sincerity, such as a declaration of commitment to Judaism.

Another example of the issues involved is the case of converts to Judaism who cease to practice Judaism (whether or not they still regard themselves as Jewish), do not accept or follow halakha, or now adhere to another religion. Technically, such a person remains Jewish, like all Jews, provided that the original conversion is valid. However, in some recent cases, Haredi rabbinical authorities, as well as the current Religious Zionist Israeli Chief Rabbinate, have taken the view that a given convert's lapse from Orthodox Jewish observance is evidence that he or she cannot, even at the time of the conversion, have had the full intention to observe the commandments and that the conversion must therefore have been invalid.

A valid Jewish court of sufficient stature has the ability to revoke a person's or a group's status as Jews. This was done for the lost Ten Tribes of Israel and the Samaritans.

== Religious definitions ==
=== Biblical perspective ===
Initially, Jews referred to the inhabitants of the Kingdom of Judah, located in the southern Levant. These inhabitants were mostly descendants of the Tribe of Judah, who descended from Judah, the son of Jacob. Jews also referred to the inhabitants of Judea. However, there is biblical evidence of tribal membership being based on one's self-allegiance to a tribe or residency within assigned tribal territory (Ezekiel 47:21–23).

Scholars describe Biblical Jews as a 'proto-nation', in the modern nationalist sense, comparable to ancient Greeks, Gauls and Celtic Britons.

It is likely that Jews also referred to allies of the Judean state.

=== Halakhic perspective ===
According to the traditional Rabbinic view, which is maintained by all branches of Orthodox Judaism and Conservative Judaism, and some branches of Reform Judaism, only halakha can define who is or is not a Jew when a question of Jewish identity, lineage, or parentage arises about any person seeking to define themselves or claim that they are Jewish.

As a result, mere belief in the principles of Judaism does not make one a Jew. Similarly, non-adherence by a Jew to the 613 Mitzvot, or even formal conversion to another religion, does not make one lose one's Jewish status. Thus, the immediate descendants of all female Jews (even apostates) are still considered to be Jews, as are those of all their female descendants. Even those descendants who are not aware they are Jews or practice a religion other than Judaism, are defined by this perspective as Jews, as long as they come from an unbroken female line of descent. As a corollary, the children of a Jewish father and a non-Jewish mother are not considered to be Jews by Halakha unless they formally convert according to Halakha, even if raised fully observant in the Mitzvot.

Those not born to a Jewish mother may become accepted as Jews by the Orthodox and Conservative communities through a formal process of conversion to Judaism in order to become "righteous converts" (Gerei Tzedek—Hebrew: גרי צדק). In addition, Halakha requires that the new convert commit himself to the observance of its tenets; this is called Kabbalat Ol Mitzvot (Hebrew: קבלת עול מצוות), "Acceptance of the Yoke of the Commandments". Kabbalat mitzvot (Hebrew: קבלת מצוות) is used by Reform Judaism in accordance with reform responsa and Halakhah.

Both Haredi Judaism and Modern Orthodox Judaism accept a similar set of rules regarding Jewish status based on classical rabbinic Judaism, including both matrilineal descent and requirements that conversions be performed by Orthodox rabbis and that converts promise to strictly observe elements of traditional Judaism such as Shabbat and Niddah. However, their application of these rules have been different, and the difference has been increasing in recent years. Modern Orthodox authorities have been more inclined to rule in favor of Jewish status and to accept non-Orthodox Jews' word in doubtful cases involving people claiming to be Jews, while Haredi authorities have in recent years tended to presume non-Jewish status and require more stringent rules and standards of evidence in order for Jewish status to be proven, and have tended to distrust the evidence of Jews who are not personally Orthodox. Haredi rabbis have tended to look at a convert's current personal observance and to regard deficiencies or lack of Orthodoxy in current observance as evidence that the convert never intended to validly convert. In addition, the contemporary situation is further complicated by the fact that some Haredi rabbis no longer regard some Modern Orthodox rabbis as reliable.

=== Karaite Judaism ===
Karaite Judaism relies on the Tanakh to indicate that Jewishness is passed down through the paternal line, not the maternal line as is maintained by Orthodox Judaism (though a minority holds that both parents need to be Jewish). Karaite Jews are eligible for Aliyah under the Law of Return. The eligibility of converts to Judaism through the Karaite movement to make Aliyah under the Law of Return has not yet been addressed in Israeli courts.

Several verses in the Bible mentioning about laws of family inheritance depending on the paternal lineage of the tribe:

So shall not the inheritance of the children of Israel remove from tribe to tribe: for every one of the children of Israel shall keep himself to the inheritance of the tribe of his fathers. And every daughter, that possesseth an inheritance in any tribe of the children of Israel, shall be wife unto one of the family of the tribe of her father, that the children of Israel may enjoy every man the inheritance of his fathers.

— Book of Numbers 36 :7–8

=== Reform Judaism ===
Reform Judaism recognizes a child as being Jewish if either parent is Jewish and the child is being raised Jewish. Voices within the Reform movement say that the law, which changed to matriarchal around 2,000 years ago (originally in the Torah the offspring was determined by patriarchal descent) and was based on the tragic circumstances the Jewish people were facing, was once helpful but is no longer relevant.

Modern Progressive Jewish denominations have a conversion process based on their principles. In the US, an official Reform resolution in 1893 abolished circumcision as a requirement for converts, and Reform does not require converts to have tevilah, ritual immersion. A "prospective convert declares, orally and in writing, in the presence of a rabbi and no less than two lay leaders of the congregation and community, acceptance of the Jewish religion and the intention to live in accordance with its mitzvot".

==== Controversies ====
The controversy in determining "who is a Jew" concerns four basic issues:

One issue arises because North American Reform and UK Liberal movements have changed some of the halakhic requirements for Jewish identity in two ways:

1. Children born of just one Jewish parent – regardless of whether the father or mother is Jewish – can claim a Jewish identity. A child of only one Jewish parent who does not claim this identity has, in the eyes of the Reform movement, forfeited his/her Jewish identity. By contrast, the halakhic view is that any child born to a Jewish mother is Jewish, whether or not he/she is raised Jewish, or even whether the mother considers herself Jewish. As an example, the children of Madeleine Albright (who was raised Catholic and was unaware of her Jewish heritage) would all be Jewish according to halakha, since their mother's traceable female ancestors were all Jewish and all three of her children were female. However, this is not the belief of progressive Judaism, which views Jews who convert to or are raised in another religion as non-Jews.
2. The requirement of brit milah has been relaxed, as has the requirement of ritual immersion. (While the Conservative movement permits conversion without circumcision in some cases, most Orthodox Jews do not)

Secondly, Orthodox Judaism asserts that non-Orthodox rabbis are not qualified to form a beit din. This has led to non-Orthodox conversions generally being unaccepted in Orthodox communities. Since Orthodox Judaism maintains the traditional standards for conversion – in which the commitment to observe halakha is required – non-Orthodox conversions are generally not accepted in Orthodox communities because the non-Orthodox movements perform conversions in which the new convert does not undertake to observe halakha as understood by Orthodox Judaism.

A third controversy concerns persons (whether born Jews or converts to Judaism) who have converted to another religion. The traditional view is such persons remain Jewish. Reform Judaism regards such people as apostates, and states regarding Messianic Jews: "'Messianic Jews' claim that they are Jews, but we must asked [sic] ourselves whether we identify them as Jews. We can not do so as they consider Jesus of Nazareth as the Messiah who has fulfilled the Messianic promises. In this way, they have clearly placed themselves within Christianity. They may be somewhat different from other Christians as they follow various Jewish rites and ceremonials, but that does not make them Jews." Regardless, such people do not count as Jewish for the purposes of the Israeli citizenship laws.

A fourth controversy stems from the manner in which the Chief Rabbinate of Israel has been handling marriage and conversion decisions in recent years. Conversions and marriages within Israel are legally controlled by the Orthodox Israeli Chief Rabbinate; therefore, a person not proven to be a Jew to the Rabbinate's satisfaction is not legally permitted to marry a Jew in Israel today. Although the Rabbinate has always refused to accept non-Orthodox conversions, until recent years it was more willing to accept the Jewish parentage of applicants based on personal testimony, and the validity of conversions based on the testimony of Orthodox Rabbis. However, in recent years the rabbinate, whose rabbis historically had a more Modern Orthodox orientation, has increasingly been filled by the more stringent Haredi camp. It has increasingly been inclined to presume that applicants are not Jewish until proven otherwise, and require more stringent standards of proof than in the past. It has implemented a policy of refusing to accept the testimony of non-Orthodox Jews in matters of Jewish status, on grounds that such testimony is not reliable. It also has been increasingly skeptical of the reliability of Orthodox rabbis ordained by institutions not subject to its accreditation, particularly in matters of conversion. Accordingly, non-Orthodox Jews born to Jewish parents, and some Jews converted by Orthodox rabbis, have been increasingly unable to prove their Jewishness to the Rabbinate's satisfaction, because they are unable to find an Orthodox rabbi who is both acceptable to the Rabbinate, and familiar with and willing to vouch for the Jewishness of their maternal lineage or the validity of their conversion.

There have been several attempts to convene representatives of the three major movements to formulate a practical solution to this issue. To date, these have failed, though all parties concede the importance of the issue is greater than any sense of rivalry among them.

== Ethnic definitions ==
Ethnic Jew is a term generally used to describe a person of Jewish parentage and background who does not necessarily actively practice Judaism, but still identifies with Judaism or other Jews culturally or fraternally, or both. The term ethnic Jew does not specifically exclude practicing Jews, but they are usually simply referred to as "Jews" without the qualifying adjective "ethnic". (Note: See Ethnic group.)

The term can refer to people of diverse beliefs and backgrounds because genealogy largely defines who is "Jewish". "Ethnic Jew" is sometimes used to distinguish non-practicing from practicing (religious) Jews. Other terms include non-observant Jew, non-religious Jew, non-practicing Jew, and secular Jew.

The term may also refer to Jews who do not practice the religion of Judaism. Typically, ethnic Jews are cognizant of their Jewish background and may feel strong cultural (even if not religious) ties to Jewish traditions and to the Jewish people or nation. Like people of any other ethnicity, non-religious ethnic Jews often assimilate into a surrounding non-Jewish culture, but, especially in areas where there is a strong local Jewish culture, they may remain largely part of that culture instead.

"Ethnic Jews" include atheists, agnostics, non-denominational deists, Jews with only casual connections to Jewish denominations or converts to other religions, such as Christianity, Buddhism, or Islam. Religious Jews of all denominations sometimes engage in outreach to non-religious Jews. In the case of some Hasidic denominations (e.g. Chabad-Lubavitch), this outreach extends to actively proselytizing more secular Jews.

=== Public opinion ===
The 2013 Pew Research study of American Jews found that 62% thought that being Jewish was mainly a matter of ancestry and culture, while 15% thought that it was mainly a matter of religion. Of those who stated themselves to be Jews by religion, 55% thought that being Jewish was mainly a matter of ancestry and culture, while two-thirds thought that it was not necessary to believe in God to be Jewish.

=== Historical European definitions ===
During the Middle Ages there was no need to ask the question "who is a Jew?", because the difference between the Jewish and the non-Jewish community was clear to both sides. For example, a person born to a Jewish family was Jewish, marriages between Jews and non-Jews were not allowed, and the only way to leave the Jewish identity was through not only leaving the religion, but also cutting all ties to the Jewish community, including family and friends. To Medieval Jews the most essential difference between them and others was not about faith but about the peoplehood, to which their religious community was tied into, and they called themselves "Israel".

As the emancipation for Jews in Europe became relevant, the ideology of nationalism started rising and in parts of Western Europe religion became more clearly separated from ethnicity, the question of what kind of a group the Jews were - religious, cultural, racial, national or something else - became discussed more. Due to emancipation, Jews were expected to assimilate into European nations. Religious difference was tolerated better than ethnic, and Jews were now sometimes defined just as a religious group, e.g. Jews in Germany were defined as Germans who practice "Mosaic faith". Jews themselves were usually not happy with this definition. Yet, as seeking for equal civil rights and to prove that Jews can be a part of Western civilizations as well, some Central European Jews started highlighting their identity more as a religious group, with some rejecting ethnic definitions of Jewishness completely and some consciously getting rid of their "oriental" habits. Many Jews however, especially in Eastern Europe, criticized Western Jews for losing their Jewishness. Still, simultaneously, the concept of "Semitic race", which included the Jews, was coined. This also lead to pseudoscientific ideas of Jews being racially inferior to "Aryans". Later the Holocaust caused some more Jews to avoid attaching ethnic or racial elements to being Jewish. In the Soviet Union, "Jewish" was a nationality by law, as with other nationalities such as Russians, Ukrainians, Georgians and others, and Soviet Jews themselves had a strong sense of ethnic Jewishness ("Yiddishkeit") which would have separated them from surrounding ethnic groups. There were certain restrictions on their civil liberties in the early years of the Soviet Union.

=== DNA ===
The modern genealogical DNA test of ethnicity is a non-religious definition of 'who is a Jew?' as increasing numbers of persons discover their biological and cultural origins outside the traditional religious setting. There has been controversy about the use of DNA tests in Israeli rabbinical courts as a test of Jewishness.

=== "Half-Jewish" ===
In the United States and Europe, because of intermarriage, the population of "half-Jews" is beginning to rival that of Jews with two Jewish parents. Self-identified "half-Jews" consider the term a familial category, which reflects multiple heritages and possible Jewish cultural or spiritual practices. Other similar terms that have been used include: "part-Jewish" and "partial-Jews". The term "Gershom", "Gershomi" or "Beta Gershom" has also been seldom used as an alternative to "half-Jewish" and "part-Jewish" in connection with descendants of intermarriage, Gershom being the biblical son of Moses and his Midianite wife Zipporah. The term typically has no religious meaning, as terms like Jewish Christian do, but rather describes ethnic Jewry.

== Other non-religious definitions ==
The Society for Humanistic Judaism defines a Jew as "someone who identifies with the history, culture and fate of the Jewish people". In their view it is, therefore, possible for a non-religious individual to adopt Judaism and join a Humanistic Jewish community, and for the Society for Humanistic Judaism to adopt the person wanting to be part of the Humanistic Jewish family. As Israeli author Amos Oz puts it, "a Jew is anyone who chooses or is compelled to share a common fate with other Jews." Oz summed up his position more succinctly in a monologue published in Tikkun, saying "Who is a Jew? Everyone who is mad enough to call himself or herself a Jew is a Jew.". From a similar perspective it is possible for a person born and raised as a Jew to leave Judaism and no longer be a Jew: famous historical examples are Heinrich Heine, Benjamin Disraeli, Gustav Mahler, Georg Brandes.

== Legal structure in Israel ==
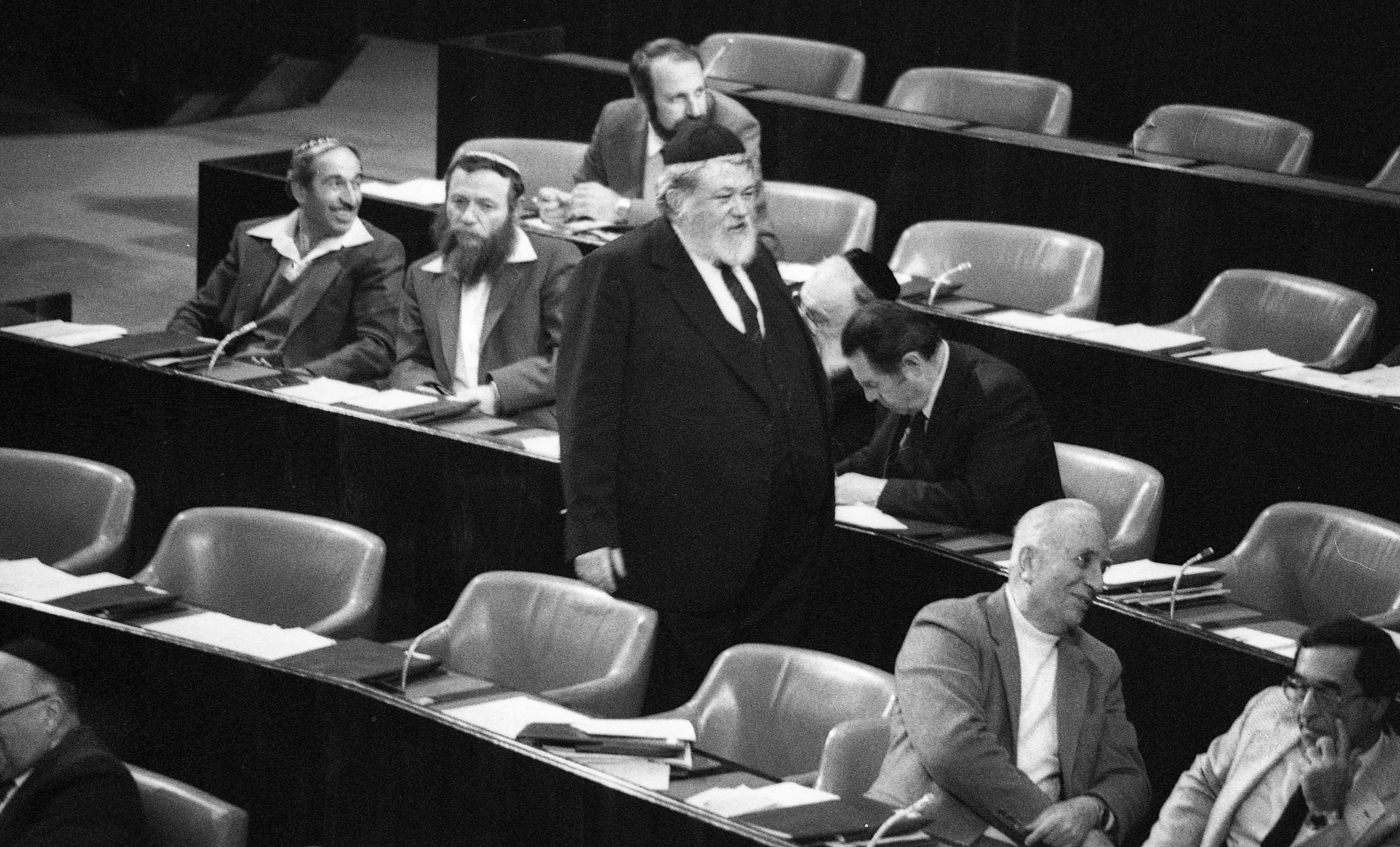
A special session of the Knesset to decide the question 'Who is a Jew', 1983

Israeli constitutional documents have not defined "who is a Jew" although the decision whether someone is Jewish or not has important legal, social and financial ramifications. This lack of definition has given rise to legal controversy in Israel and there have been many court cases in Israel that have addressed the question.

=== Judaism test ===
As of 2010, anyone who immigrated to Israel after 1990 and wishes to marry or divorce via the Jewish tradition within the state limits must go through a "Judaism test" at an Orthodox Rabbinical court. In this test, a person would need to prove their claim to be Jewish to an investigator beyond a reasonable doubt. They would need to present original documentation of their matriline up to their great-grandmother (4 generations), or in the case of Ethiopian Jews, 7 generations back. In addition, they should provide government documents with nationality/religion shown as Jewish (e.g., birth/death certificates, marriage documents, etc.).

In the case of people whose original documents have been lost or never existed, it may take considerable effort to prove they are Jewish. The court rulings are not final, and any clerk has the power to question them even 20 years later, changing one's citizenship status to "on hold", and putting them in jeopardy of deportation.

The two biggest communities affected by these documentation issues are:

- Immigrants from the former Soviet Union (FSU) – a study conducted between 2003 and 2005 showed that 83% of people from the FSU who started the Judaism test process successfully finished it. An estimated 10% left the process before completion. In a later study, in 2011, a 90% success rate was achieved in the FSU immigrant community. Many Jews in the former Soviet Union took steps to hide their Jewishness. Besides post-Soviet copies of documents are suspected by the tribunal after widespread falsification, and the archived originals are difficult to access for genealogists.
- Immigrants from the United States, where government documents generally do not show religion or Jewish ethnicity.

=== Law of Return ===
Following the birth of the modern State of Israel in 1948, the Law of Return was enacted in 1950 to give any Jew the right to immigrate to Israel and become a citizen. However, due to an inability on the lawmakers to agree, the Law did not define who was a Jew, relying instead on the issue to resolve itself over time. As a result, the Law relied in form on the traditional halakhic definition. But, the absence of a definition of who is a Jew, for the purpose of the Law, has resulted in the divergent views of the various streams of Judaism competing for recognition.

Besides the generally accepted halakhic definition of who is a Jew, in 1970, the Law extended the categories of person who are entitled to immigration and citizenship to the children and grandchildren of Jews, regardless of their present religious affiliation, and their spouses. Also, converts to Judaism whose conversion was performed outside the State of Israel, regardless of who performed it, are entitled to immigration under the Law. Once again, issues arose as to whether a conversion performed outside Israel was valid. The variation of the definition in the Law and the definition used by various branches of Judaism has resulted in practical difficulties for many people.

It has been estimated that between 1986 and 2006, about 200,000 non-Jews and even practicing Christians have entered Israel from the former Soviet Union on the basis of being a child or grandchild of a Jew or by being married to a Jew.

However, there is an exception in the case of a person who has formally converted to another religion. This is derived from the Rufeisen Case in 1962, in which the Supreme Court ruled that such a person, no matter what their halakhic position, is not entitled to immigration under the Law; they concluded that "no one can regard an apostate as belonging to the Jewish people".

Current Israeli definitions specifically exclude Jews who have openly and knowingly converted to or were raised in a faith other than Judaism, including Messianic Judaism. This definition is not the same as that in traditional Jewish law; in some respects it is deliberately wider, so as to include those non-Jewish relatives of Jews who may have been perceived to be Jewish, and thus faced antisemitism.

The Law of Return does not, of itself, define the Jewish status of a person; it only deals with those who have a right to immigration to Israel.

In the early 1950s, the Israeli Chief Rabbinate originally objected to the immigration of Karaite Jews to Israel, and unsuccessfully tried to obstruct it. In 2007 Rabbi David Chayim Chelouche, the chief rabbi of Netanya, was quoted in the Jerusalem Post as saying: "A Karaite is a Jew. We accept them as Jews and every one of them who wishes to come back [to mainstream Judaism] we accept back. There was once a question about whether Karaites needed to undergo a token circumcision in order to switch to rabbinic Judaism, but the rabbinate agrees that today that is not necessary."

=== Israeli laws governing marriage and divorce ===
In relation to marriage, divorce, and burial, which are under the jurisdiction of the Israeli Interior Ministry, the halakhic definition of who is a Jew is applied. When there is any doubt, the Israeli Chief Rabbinate generally determines the issue.

In terms of social relations, most secular Jews view their Jewish identity as a matter of culture, heritage, nationality, or ethnicity. Ancestral aspects can be explained by the many Jews who view themselves as atheists and are defined by matrilineal descent or a Cohen (Kohen) or Levi, which is connected by ancestry. The question of "who is a Jew" is a question that is under debate. Issues related to ancestral or ethnic Jews are dealt with by the Israeli Chief Rabbinate.

Orthodox halachic rules apply to converts who want to marry in Israel. Under these rules, a conversion to Judaism must strictly follow halachic standards to be recognised as valid. The rabbinate even scrutinizes Orthodox conversions, with some who have converted by orthodox authorities outside Israel not being permitted to marry in Israel.

If one's ancestral line of Jewishness is in doubt, then a proper conversion would be required in order to be allowed to marry in the Orthodox community, or in Israel, where such rules govern all marriages.

=== Israeli definition of nationality ===
The Jewish status of a person in Israel is considered a matter of "nationality".

In the registering of "nationality" on Israeli identity cards, which is administered by the Ministry of the Interior, a person had to meet the Halakhic definition to be registered as a "Jew". However, in a number of cases the Supreme Court of Israel has ordered the Ministry of Interior to register Reform and Conservative converts as Jews. The right of people who convert in the Diaspora under Reform or Conservative auspices to immigrate to Israel and claim citizenship as Jews is detailed in Israeli law.

Until recently, Israeli identity cards had an indication of nationality, and the field was left empty for those who immigrated not solely on the basis of being Jewish (i.e. as a child, grandchild or spouse of a Jew only) to indicate that the person may not be a Jew. Many Israeli citizens who are not recognised by the Rabbinate as Jewish have been issued with Israeli identity cards that do not include their Hebrew calendar birth date.

=== Outside Israel ===
In 2010 the Labour Court of South Africa addressed the question of who is a Jew for the purposes of the Employment Equity Act. The question has also arisen in the United Kingdom, where religious schools are allowed to select all or a proportion of their intake based upon religion. A 2009 ruling, R(E) v Governing Body of JFS, determined that the definition of Jewish religion based upon descent constituted discrimination on ethnic grounds, and therefore contravened racial discrimination laws. Also in the UK, under the Sunday Trading Act 1994 "a person of the Jewish religion" who observes the Jewish Sabbath can open their shops on Sundays. The Act defines "person of the Jewish religion" as someone who holds a certificate that they are Jewish from a Rabbi, synagogue secretary or the representative body of British Jewry, the Board of Deputies.

In 2009, a United Kingdom court considered whether the question was a racial issue, in the case R(E) v Governing Body of JFS (2009).

== Other definitions ==
There have been other attempts to determine Jewish identity beside the traditional Jewish approaches. These range from genetic population studies (Note: See Y-chromosomal Aaron) to controversial evolutionary perspectives including those espoused by Kevin B. MacDonald and Yuri Slezkine. Historians, such as the late Kamal Salibi, have utilized etymology and geography to reconstruct the prehistoric origin of the Jewish people in the Arabian Peninsula.

=== Sociology and anthropology ===
As with any other ethnic identity, Jewish identity is, to some degree, a matter of either claiming that identity or being perceived by others (both inside and outside the ethnic group) as belonging to that group, or both. Returning again to the example of Madeleine Albright—during her Catholic childhood, her being in some sense Jewish was presumably irrelevant. It was only after she was nominated to be Secretary of State that she, and the public, discovered her Jewish ancestry.

Ido Abram states that there are five aspects to contemporary Jewish identity:

1. Religion, culture, and tradition.
2. The tie with Israel and Zionism.
3. Dealings with antisemitism, including issues of persecution and survival.
4. Personal history and life-experience.
5. Relationship with non-Jewish culture and people.

The relative importance of these factors may vary enormously from place to place. For example, a typical Dutch Jew might describe their Jewish identity simply as "I was born Jewish," while a Jew in Romania, where levels of antisemitism are higher, might say, "I consider any form of denying as a proof of cowardice."

=== Christian Philosophy ===
Troy W. Martin argued that Jewishness is not dependent on ancestry but instead, based only on adherence to "covenantal circumcision".

=== The Inquisition ===
During the time of the Spanish and Portuguese Inquisitions, conversion to Roman Catholicism did not result in total termination of the person's Jewish status. Legally, the converts were no longer regarded as Jews and thus allowed to stay in the Iberian Peninsula. During the Inquisition in Spain and Portugal, however, many Jews were forced to convert, but thereafter were regarded by many people, though not in a legal form, as New Christians, distinguishing them as separate from the Old Christians of non-Jewish lineage. Since legal, political, religious and social pressure pushed many people to untrue conversions (public behaviour as Christians while retaining some Jewish beliefs and practices privately, a kind of crypto-Judaism), (Note: See Marrano and Anusim) they were still treated with suspicion, a stigma sometimes carried for several generations by their identifiable descendants. The limpieza de sangre ("Cleanliness of blood") required public officials or candidates for membership of many organizations to prove that they did not have Jewish or Muslim ancestry.

=== Secular philosophy ===
Jean-Paul Sartre, who was not Jewish, suggested in Anti-Semite and Jew (1948) that Jewish identity "is neither national nor international, neither religious nor ethnic, nor political: it is a quasi-historical community." While Jews as individuals may be in danger from the antisemite who sees only "Jews" and not "people", Sartre argues that the Jewish experience of antisemitism preserves—even creates—the sense of Jewish community. In his most extreme statement of this view he wrote, "It is the anti-Semite who creates the Jew." Conversely, that sense of specific Jewish community may be threatened by the democrat who sees only "the person" and not "the Jew".

Hannah Arendt repeatedly asserted a principle of claiming Jewish identity in the face of antisemitism. "If one is attacked as a Jew, one must defend oneself as a Jew. Not as a German, not as a world-citizen, not as an upholder of the Rights of Man, or whatever"; "A man attacked as a Jew cannot defend himself as an Englishman or a Frenchman. The world can only conclude from this that he is simply not defending himself at all."

Wade Clark Roof (1976), a sociologist at the University of California at Santa Barbara, proposed that social sectors in modern life, in which traditional symbols and rituals are meaningful, provide an alternative approach for explaining the social basis of religion in a secular order, in doing so, he turned to the local community as a sphere in modern society that still persists "as a complex system of friendship and kinship networks, formal and informal associations, as well as symbolic attachments, very much rooted in family life and ongoing socialization processes".

=== Antisemitic definitions ===
The question "who is a Jew?" is also sometimes of importance to non-Jews. Historically, it had exceptional significance when it was considered by anti-Jewish groups for the purpose of targeting Jews for persecution or discrimination. The definition can have an impact on whether a person may have a certain job, live in certain locations, receive a free education, live or continue to live in specific countries, be imprisoned, or executed.

==== Nazism ====
The question was of critical importance during the rule of the Nazi party in Germany, which persecuted the Jews and defined them for the government's purposes by the Nuremberg Laws.

The Nazi regime instituted laws which discriminated against Jews, declared a race by the Nazis, and thus needed a working definition of who is a Jew as to its law-defined race system. These definitions almost completely categorised persons through the religions followed by each individual's ancestors, according to membership registries. Thus, personal faith or individual observance, as well as the religious definitions of Judaism as given by the Halacha, were mostly ignored.

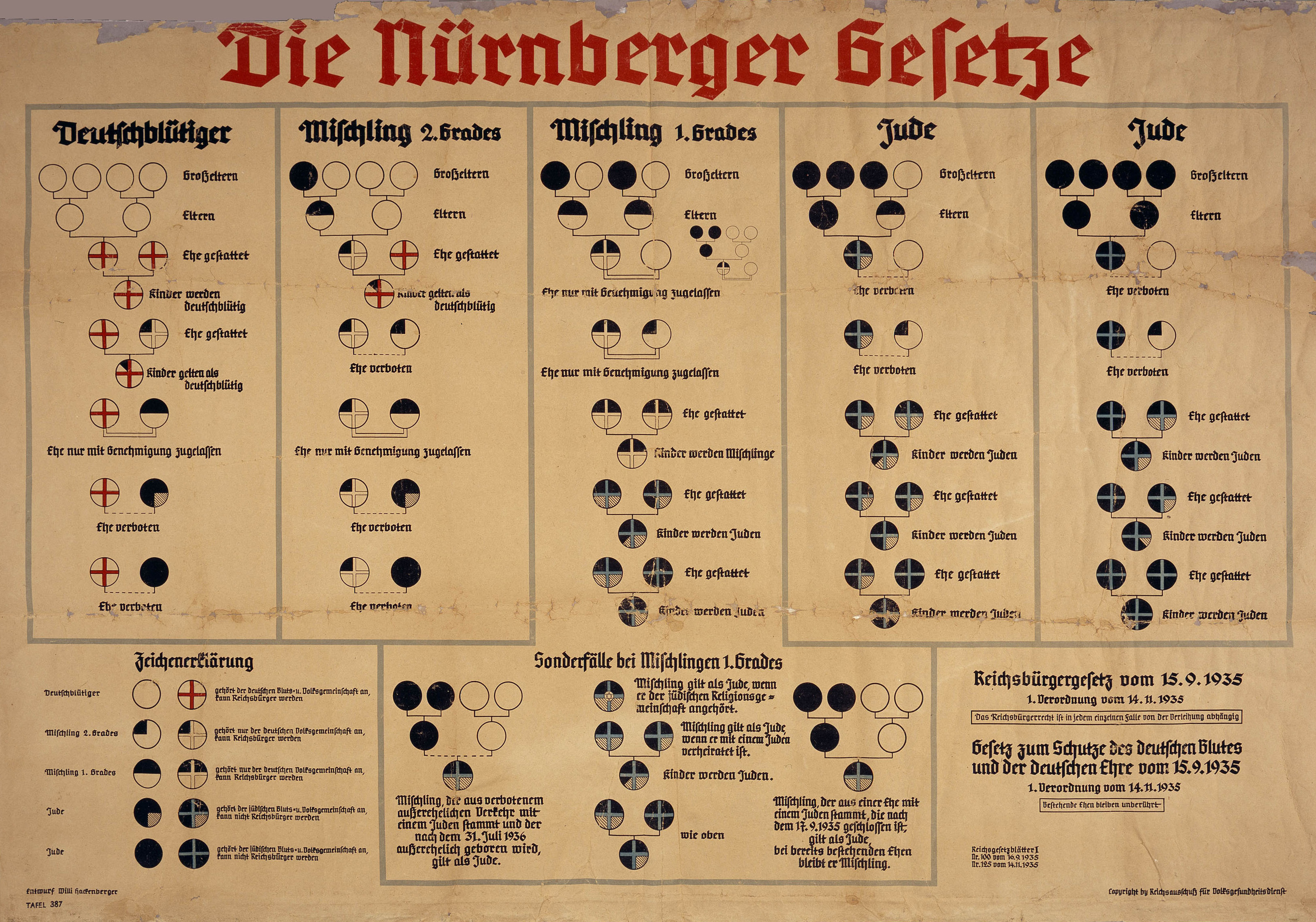
Nazi guide to the Nuremberg laws

In Germany itself, the Ahnenpass and the Nuremberg Laws classified people as being of the Jewish race if they were descended from three or four grandparents enrolled in Jewish congregations. A person with one or two grandparents enrolled in a Jewish congregation could be classified as Mischling, a crossbreed, of "mixed blood", even if they were not a member of a Jewish congregation at the time the Nuremberg Laws were enacted. The Mischling Test was introduced in order to identify Europeans with Jewish blood, and these were classified as "Jews of the first or second degree". Only people with at least two grandparents of "German blood" could be German Reich citizens. Other Germans were dropped into a new second class group of citizens, the so-called "state subjects" (Staatsangehörige).

If a person with grandparents of the same religious combination was enrolled as a member of a Jewish congregation in 1935, or later enrolled, they switched from the discriminatory class of Mischlinge into that of Geltungsjude, "Jew by legal validity" even if they did not meet the criterion of descent from three or four Jewish grandparents. In the eyes of the Nazi government, one could not become a non-Jew by seceding from one's Jewish congregation, becoming non-practicing, marrying outside the religion, or converting to Christianity. Thus any Mischling could move into the class of Geltungsjude by joining a Jewish congregation, but the Nuremberg Laws provided that the classification of any Geltungsjude would not change even she or he tried to evade harm by withdrawing from their Jewish congregation after 1935, considering such secessions as being of no effect. Similarly, after 1935, any Mischling with two Jewish grandparents (colloquially called a half-Jew) who married anybody classified as a Jew would drop into the Geltungsjude class. Mischlinge with one Jewish grandparent were usually forbidden from marrying anybody with any Jewish grandparents.

In 1935 the Nuremberg Laws forbade new marriages between people who were classified as Jews and people who belonged to other classifications. (Note: See Anti-miscegenation laws#Nazi Germany, Mischlinge) Earlier contracted marriages between spouses of different classifications (so-called mixed marriages; Mischehe) provided the Jewish-classified spouse with uncertain protection from some discriminations and atrocities.

There were very few Karaites in Europe during the Nazi era; most of them lived in Turkey, Greece, and the Crimea. Karaites were not considered Jewish for the purpose of the Holocaust extermination policy; according to SS Obergruppenführer Gottlob Berger, writing on November 24, 1944, discrimination against the Karaites had been prohibited due to their proximity to the Crimean Tatars, to whom Berger views the Karaites as being related. Nazis still retained hostility towards the Karaites, on grounds of their religion; and there were a number of small scale massacres of Karaites.

In German-occupied France, an ordinance defined a Jew as an individual who belonged to the Jewish religion or who had more than two Jewish grandparents.

The Vichy régime in southern France defined a Jew as an individual with three Jewish grandparents or two grandparents if his/her spouse was Jewish. Richard Weisberg points out that this was a potentially broader classification than the one used in occupied France, for example, a Mischling could not be classified a Jew under the Nazi dictate, by her/his spouse's classification if the marriage was contracted before the imposition of antisemitic marriage laws there, but would be deemed one under the Vichy act if he/she had married a Jew, regardless when.

== Israelite identity loss claims ==
There are various groups besides Jews which have claimed to be descended from the biblical Israelites. The question nowadays arises in relation to Israel's Law of Return, with various groups seeking to migrate there. Some claims have been accepted, some are under consideration, while others have been rejected by Israel's rabbinate.

=== Cochin Jews (Indian Jews) ===
Some sources say that the earliest Jews of Cochin, India, were those who settled in the Malabar Coast during the times of King Solomon of Israel, and after the Kingdom of Israel split into two. There is historical documentation of the Jews being in Cochin after the fall of the Second Temple, from around the first century CE. Later additions were smaller immigration of Sephardic Jews from Europe in the sixteenth century after the expulsion from Spain, and Baghdadi Jews, Arabic-speaking Jews who arrived in the late eighteenth century, at the beginning of the British colonial era. Following the independence of India and the establishment of Israel, most Cochin Jews emigrated to Israel in the mid-1950s. Some have gone on to North America or Britain.

=== Bene Israel ===
The Bene Israel in India claim to be descended from Jews who escaped persecution in Galilee in the 2nd century BCE. The Bene Israel resemble the non-Jewish Marathi people in appearance and customs, which indicates some intermarriage between Jews and Indians. The Bene Israel, however, maintained the practices of Jewish dietary laws, male circumcision and observation of the Sabbath as a day of rest. From the late eighteenth century, other Jewish communities instructed them in normative Judaism.

Initially, the Orthodox rabbinate in Israel said that the Bene Israel would have to undergo conversion in order to marry other Jews, as matrilineal descent could not be proven. In 1964 the Israeli Rabbinate declared that the Bene Israel are "full Jews in every respect".

The Bene Israel claim a lineage to the Kohanim, the Israelite priestly class, which claims descent from Aaron, the brother of Moses. In 2002, DNA testing revealed that the Bene Israel shared some genetic markers of the Kohanim. These are not exclusive to the Kohanim, but appear among them at a higher frequency. These are also shared with some non-Jewish Semitic peoples.

Many of the Bene Israel emigrated from India to Israel, where around 6,000 Jews of this group reside. About 5,000 remain in India. They maintain 65 synagogues in Israel.

=== Beta Israel ===
The Beta Israel or Falasha is a group formerly living in Ethiopia who have a tradition of descent from the lost tribe of Dan. They have a long history of practicing such Jewish traditions as kashrut, Sabbath and Passover, and had Jewish texts. In 1975, their claim of Jewishness was accepted by the Chief Rabbinate of Israel and the Israeli government. The government assisted them in emigrating en masse to Israel during the 1980s and 1990s as Jews under the Law of Return, when Ethiopia was undergoing a civil war. Some who claim to be Beta Israel still live in Ethiopia.

=== Bnei Menashe ===
The Bnei Menashe is a group in India claiming to be descendants of the half-tribe of Menashe. Members who have studied Hebrew and who observe the Sabbath and other Jewish laws in 2005 received the support of the Sephardic Chief Rabbi of Israel to arrange formal conversion to Judaism. Some have converted and immigrated to Israel under the Law of Return.

=== The Kaifeng Jews ===
The Kaifeng Jews, a Mandarin-speaking group from Henan Province, China, experienced first contact with Europeans in 1605 via the religious scholar Matteo Ricci. Modern researchers believe these Jews were descended from Persian merchants who settled in China during the early Song dynasty. They prospered during the Ming dynasty as Confucian civil servants, soldiers, and merchants, but they quickly assimilated and lost much of their Jewish heritage. By the beginning of the 19th century, the last rabbi with knowledge of Hebrew died, leaving no successor. The community had become extinct religiously by the late Qing dynasty due to anti-foreign persecutions brought on by the Taiping Rebellion and Boxer Rebellion. There are a small number of Chinese people today who consider themselves to be descendants of these Jews.

Despite their isolation from the rest of the Jewish diaspora, the Jews of Kaifeng preserved Jewish traditions and customs for many centuries. In the 17th century, assimilation began to erode these traditions. The rate of intermarriage between Jews and other ethnic groups, such as the Han Chinese, and the Hui and Manchu minorities in China, increased. The destruction of the synagogue in the 1860s led to the community's demise. However, J. L. Liebermann, the first Western Jew to visit Kaifeng in 1867, noted that "they still had a burial ground of their own". S. M. Perlmann, the Shanghai businessman and scholar, wrote in 1912 that "they bury their dead in coffins, but of a different shape than those of the Chinese are made, and do not attire the dead in secular clothes as the Chinese do, but in linen". To date, there is only one scholar, Zhou Xu, who doubts the Kaifeng community's Jewishness and claims them to have been a western construct.

Today, 600–1,000 residents of Kaifeng trace their lineage to this community. After contact with Jewish tourists, the Jews of Kaifeng have reconnected to mainstream Jewry. With the help of Jewish organizations, some members of the community have emigrated to Israel. In 2009, Chinese Jews from Kaifeng arrived in Israel as immigrants.

=== The Lemba ===
The Lemba, group of people from southern Africa, primarily Zimbabwe and South Africa, speak the Bantu languages spoken by their geographic neighbours and resemble them physically, but they have some religious practices and beliefs similar to those in Judaism and Islam, which they claim were transmitted by oral tradition. They have a tradition of ancient Jewish or South Arabian descent through their male line. Genetic Y-DNA analyses in the 2000s have established a partially Middle-Eastern origin for a portion of the male Lemba population. More recent research argues that DNA evidence does not support claims for a specifically Jewish genetic heritage.

=== New Mexico's Crypto-Jews ===
A small Hispano group of Sephardic Jews in northern New Mexico may be one of the oldest groups of practicing Jews in North America, dating back to the early Spanish settlers of Jewish descent who had been forcibly converted to Catholicism as Conversos or New Christians, or both after 1492. Some families of Conversos began to settle in Mexico City in the 1530s and 1540s. Some converted back to Judaism; others maintained some Jewish beliefs and practices in secret. After the Spanish Inquisition came to the New World in 1571, the conversos were threatened with death if it was found they were practicing Judaism.

In 1598, the first expedition was made to New Mexico and included conversos. After that, other conversos fled to the northwestern frontier of the Spanish Empire, today the southwestern United States, to evade the scrutiny and threat of discovery in the more monitored settlements. Outwardly Catholic, these forced converts maintained Jewish practices and customs for generations in secret, hence their name, "Crypto-Jews". They have been the subject of recent academic study. Some of New Mexico's Crypto-Jews have begun to return to normative Judaism in recent years, through study and ritual conversion. Others feel enlarged by learning this part of their history but continue as practicing Catholics.

A genetic study of men in the early 2000s showed that many Hispanos of the North-American Southwest are descended from Anusim (Sephardic Jews who were forcibly converted to Roman Catholicism). Only Catholic Spanish were allowed to go to the New World with the exploration and colonial expeditions. Families first kept their secrets for protection and then out of habit. Michael Hammer, a research professor at the University of Arizona and an expert on Jewish genetics, said that fewer than 1% of non-Semites possessed the male-specific "Cohanim marker" or Cohen Modal Haplotype, which is prevalent among Jews claiming descent from hereditary priests. 30 of 78 Latinos tested in New Mexico (38.5%), were found to have Y-DNA with the Cohanim marker. Wider DNA testing of Hispanic populations has revealed between 10% and 15% of men living in New Mexico, south Texas and northern Mexico have a Y chromosome associated with the Middle East. Their history makes it most likely that they are Jewish rather than Arabic Muslims.

In 2008, a gene mutation that is typically found only in Ashkenazi Jews, and is linked to a virulent form of breast cancer in women, was discovered in a cluster of Hispanic Catholic women in southern Colorado, many of whom trace their family's roots to northern New Mexico. It was conclusively shown to be related to Jewish ancestry, given the history of the people in the area, and many families reported knowledge of a high incidence of cancer. After testing and notification of families, researchers worked with the extended families on genetic counseling and to develop health strategies for monitoring, early detection and treatment, as they were faced with the higher risk associated with the gene.

== See also ==
- Anusim
- Crypto-Judaism
- Converso
- God-fearer
- Groups claiming affiliation with Israelites
- Interfaith marriage in Judaism
- Ioudaios
- Jewish adjacent
- Jewish assimilation
- Jewish identity
- Jewish peoplehood
- Mandaeans
- Marrano
- On Venus, Have We Got a Rabbi!
- "What Is a Nation?"
- Zera Yisrael

== Bibliography ==
- Kertzer, Morris (1996). What is a Jew?. New York: Touchstone. ISBN 0-684-84298-X.
- Siedman, Lauren (2007). What Makes Someone a Jew?. Woodstock, Vermont: Jewish Lights Publishing. ISBN 978-1-58023321-7.
