= Half-Jew =

Derogatory term for people with a non-Jewish and a Jewish parent

The term half-Jew (German: Halbjude) is a derogatory term for people with a non-Jewish and a Jewish parent. The overwhelming majority of the so-called half-Jews were legally classified as "first-degree Jewish hybrids" during the era of Nazi Germany. Occasionally, the term was used even before the Nazi era. Within Judaism, the term half-Jew is unusual since it does not recognize any partial degrees of Judaism; one is either Jewish or not.

== Situation within Nazi Germany ==
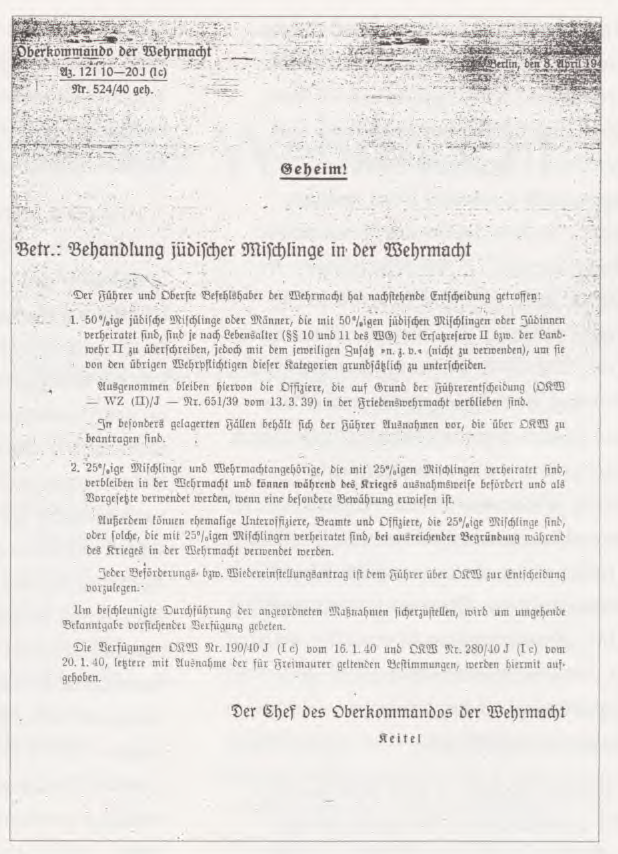
The secret directive issued by the Oberkommando des Heeres on 8 April 1940 ordering the dismissal of "half-Jews" from the Wehrmacht.

During the Nazi era, half-Jews was not a legal term. The term was not used in the Nuremberg Race Laws and the related ordinances. In 1941, the term half-Jew was included in the Duden for the first time: the group of "Jewish half-breeds" was further divided into "Jewish half-breeds of the first degree" with two Jewish grandparents and "Jewish half-breeds of the second degree" with one Jewish grandparent. However, first-degree hybrids were classified in different categories, despite the assumption of the same "biological-racial ancestry". They were not regarded as "hybrids" but as "full Jews" if they belonged to the Jewish religious community, were married to a Jew, or married a Jew after 1935. The term "Geltungsjude" was later coined for this group of "half-Jews".

This differentiated classification, which is blurred by the term "Halbjude", was of existential importance for those affected. If they were classified unfavourably, they were not admitted to university; they were forced to work at an early stage or were refused a marriage permit. During the Second World War, in marital union with a "full Jew", "half-Jews" classified as "Jews of Geltungsjuden" were deported with their spouses to ghettos or extermination camps. This danger also threatened "half-Jewish" children if the non-Jewish spouse had converted to the Jewish faith, and even if the spouses separated again to spare the children persecution.

The Nazi Party tried - as discussed at the Wannsee Conference - to classify all "half-Jews" legally as "full Jews" and to deport them. The fact that many "half-Jews" were also "half-Christians" was always ignored.

== Situation in the Occupied Territories ==
In the occupied Eastern territories, "half-Jews" were included in the extermination process indiscriminately like "full Jews". The Jewish Department at the Reich Security Main Office attempted to influence the controversial decision-making process within the Reich by also creating facts in the Western occupation areas. In August 1941 Adolf Eichmann, in agreement with Arthur Seyß-Inquart, decided to equate the "half-Jews" living in the Netherlands with the "full Jews" and to deport them. As of May 1942, "half-Jews" were also obliged to wear the Jewish star there.

== Term after 1945 ==
The term "Halbjude" was used by various people, even after the war. This led to Ignaz Bubis criticising it in 1999:

National Socialism turned the Jew into a race and completely disregarded religion. [...] After 1945, racism, but not anti-Semitism, had largely disappeared. In some minds racism still plays a role, albeit subliminally. I am always amazed when people come up to me and introduce themselves with the words that they are half-Jews. I then ask the modest question as to which part of them is Jewish, the lower or upper half, or whether they are vertical. No one has the idea of claiming to be semi-Catholic if he comes from a Catholic Protestant family.

The use of the term Halbjude has also established itself in the English-speaking world as "half-Jewish" or "part-Jewish". In other languages, the word "Father-Jew", introduced by Andreas Burnier in 1995, has since spread, marking the fact that the father is a Jew, but not the mother. This term is related to the provisions of the Halakha, according to which Jewish religious affiliation is usually derived by birth from a Jewish mother.

== Earlier history of the term ==
There are few places where the term "Halbjude" is used historically. The unpopular ruler Herod was insulted as a "half-Jew" because his family came from Idumäa, an area that had been forcibly converted to Judaism. Since he was crowned king of Judea by Rome, the term "half-Jewish" can be interpreted as a vague, derogatory term for "Jew, but not serving Jewish interests".

In 1881, the anti-Semite Eugen Dühring clearly used the term as a derogatory hereditary biological term in his pamphlet The Jewish Question As a Racial, Moral and Cultural Question.

== See also ==
- Geltungsjude
- Mischling
- Who is a Jew?
