= Aryan paragraph =

German and Austrian regulations, 1885–1945

An Aryan paragraph (German: Arierparagraph) was a clause in the statutes of an organisation, corporation, or real estate deed that reserved membership or right of residence solely for members of the "Aryan race" and excluded from such rights any non-Aryans, particularly those of Jewish and Slavic descent. They were an omnipresent aspect of public life in Germany and Austria from 1885 to 1945.

== 19th-century precursors ==
One of the first documented examples of such a paragraph was included by the Austrian German nationalist leader and anti-Semite Georg von Schönerer in his 1882 Linz Programme, and countless Austrian German sports clubs, singing groups, school organisations, reading clubs and fraternities followed suit. In the German Empire, the 1889 programme of the German Social Party called for the exclusion of Jews from public life.

== In Nazi Germany ==
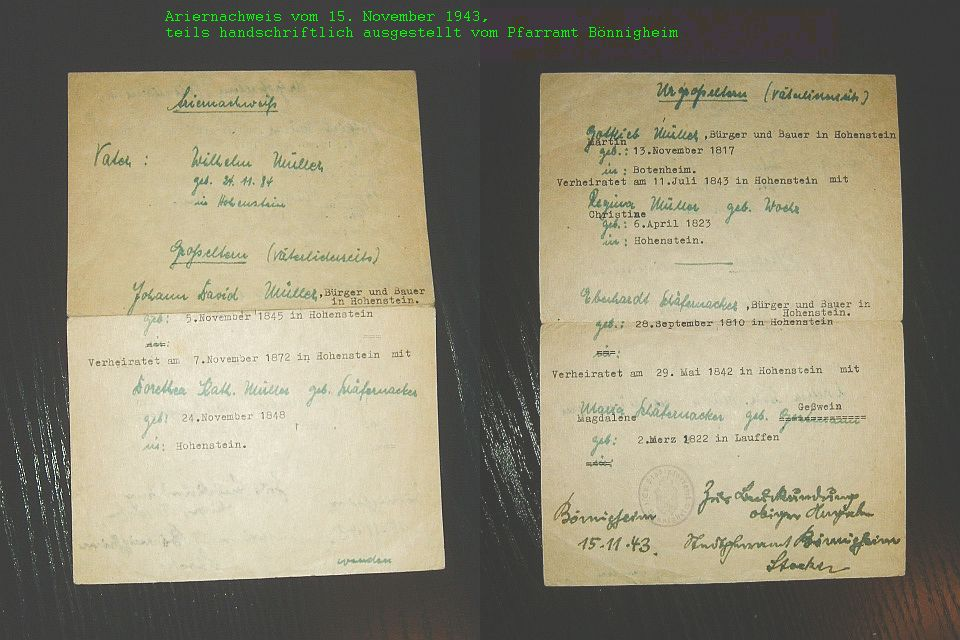
An Aryan certificate during the Nazi era, 1943

The best-known Aryan paragraphs are in the legislation of Nazi Germany. They served to exclude Jews in particular from organisations, federations, political parties, and, ultimately, all public life. The same ban was extended to Poles, Serbs, Russians, and other Slavs.

The Aryan Paragraph first appeared in the Third Reich in the formulation of the Law for the Restoration of the Professional Civil Service, which was passed on 7 April 1933. It stipulated that only those of fully Aryan descent, i.e. without Jewish parents or grandparents, could be employed in the civil service. The Aryan Paragraph was extended to education on 25 April 1933, in the Law against the Overcrowding of German Schools and Universities.

On 30 June of the same year, it was broadened to include even marriage to a "non-Aryan" as sufficient cause for exclusion from a civil service career. In keeping with the Nazi Gleichschaltung policy, Nazi Party pressure led many federations and organisations to adopt the Aryan Paragraph. Thus, Jews were barred from the public health system, honorary public offices, editorial offices (Editor Law), theatres (Reichskulturkammer), and agriculture (Reichserbhofgesetz). This discrimination culminated in the Nuremberg Laws "for the final separation of Jewry from the German Volk". Prior to this, there were exceptions, such as for combat veterans and honorary Aryans, but now Jews and "Jewish mixed-breeds" (Mischlinge) were banned from practically all professions. The Aryan Paragraph was accepted largely without protest, except within the Evangelical Church, where it provoked the splitting off of the Confessing Church.

== See also ==
- Ahnenpass
- Anti-Slavic sentiment
- Aryan certificate
- Ethnic cleansing

== Sources ==
- Gordon, Sarah (1984). Hitler, Germans and the "Jewish Question". Princeton, NJ: Princeton University Press. ISBN 0-691-05412-6.
- Longerich, Peter (2010). Holocaust: The Nazi Persecution and Murder of the Jews. New York: Oxford University Press. ISBN 9780192804365.
- Zentner, Christian; Bedürftig, Friedemann (1991). The Encyclopedia of the Third Reich. New York: Macmillan. ISBN 0-02-897502-2.

The information about Germany and Austria was translated from the German Wikipedia article on this subject.
