= Anti-Jewish legislation in pre-war Nazi Germany =

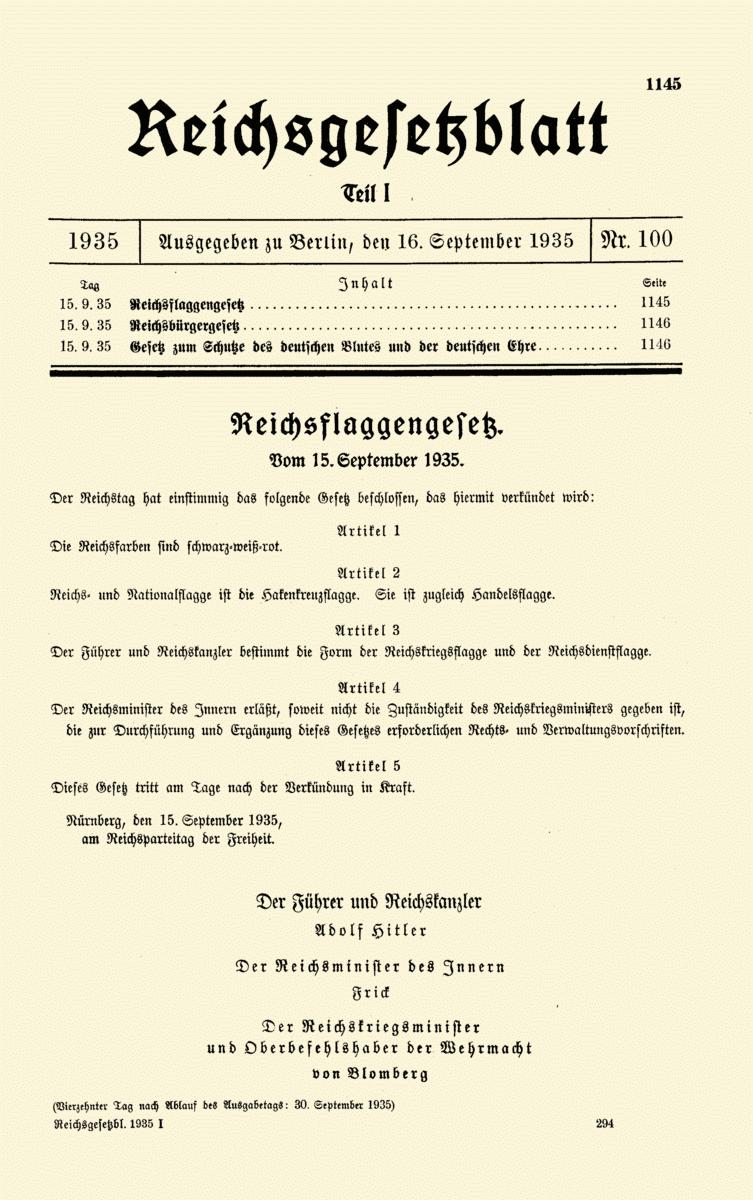
The Nuremberg Laws of 1935 as published in the Reichsgesetzblatt

Anti-Jewish legislation in pre-war Nazi Germany comprised more than 400 laws, decrees, and regulations enacted between the Nazi seizure of power in 1933 and the outbreak of WWII in Europe in 1939. These measures were issued by national, state, and municipal authorities and progressively excluded those deemed Jews from German public and private life. They restricted employment, education, and property rights while also removing political, legal, and civil rights.

The first major measures were introduced in 1933 which excluded Jews from the civil service and restricted their participation in the legal, medical, educational, and cultural professions. The Nuremberg Laws of 1935 followed, defining Jewish status principally by ancestry, depriving Jews of citizenship, and prohibited Jewish interracial marriage.

Persecution further intensified starting 1937 through the forced transfer of Jewish property. Following Kristallnacht in November 1938, further decrees expelled Jewish children from public schools, closed Jewish-owned businesses and marginalised Jews further. This final wave of legislation immediately preceded Germany's entry into World War II and paved the way for more radical persecution and mass murder during the Holocaust.

== 1933 Anti-Jewish Legislation ==
=== Enabling Act ===
The Enabling Act of 1933 established the power of the Nazi-led government to pass law by decree, bypassing the approval of parliament. It was passed on March 23, 1933, and effectively nullified the Weimar Constitution.

=== Law for the Restoration of the Professional Civil Service ===
In April 1933, the Law for the Restoration of the Professional Civil Service, or 'Civil Service Law', as it was more commonly known when passed, established the ability of the Nazi-led government to legally remove undesirables from the civil service profession, including doctors, teachers and lawyers.

This Law created the basis for the years to come, the Nazi party saw "racial purity [as a] condition of superior cultural creation and of the construction of a powerful state". The Civil Service Law was used to exclude Jews from key areas of German society.

The Law for the Restoration of the Professional Civil Service "defined the three groups of undesirable civil servants and provided for their dismissal".

1. The first group included those appointed after November 9, 1918, and could be removed if they did not have the proper training, which meant anyone could fit into these standards.
2. The second group were those who were deemed by their past that they would not always support the national state, e.g. members of the Communist Party, or any related or associated organisation.
3. The third group were any "non-Aryans", a way of excluding the Jews without explicitly mentioning "Jews" in the legislation.

=== Law Concerning Admission to the Legal Profession ===
This act of legislation was also passed in April as a supplement to the Civil Service Law. This law specifically attacked judges and public prosecutors, and forbade any Jews from taking the Bar examination which was necessary to become a lawyer.

=== Decree Regarding Physicians' Services with the National Health Service ===
This law affected Jewish doctors, and subsequently Jewish health care. Passed also in April, under this legislation, patients who saw a "non-Aryan" doctor would not be covered under the national health insurance, thus excluding Jewish doctors from German society.

=== The Law Against the Over-Crowding of German Schools ===
Looking to further enact their racial agenda, the Nazi party then looked toward curbing educational policy. On April 25, 1933, the Law Against the Over-Crowding of German schools was passed, and required an end to any Weimar teachings that discussed democracy and equality; it enforced the teaching of racial pride. Under the guise of a concern for educational over-crowding, the Nazis limited the number of Jewish students enrolled in German schools to 1.5% of the total enrollment.

=== July 1933 Citizenship and Denaturalization Law ===
With the goal of excluding Jews from having full citizenship rights, an Advisory Committee for Population and Race Policy met at the ministry of the Interior to discuss a new citizenship law.

What followed was the Denaturalization Law passed on July 14. As a result of this law, the Reich government could take away the citizenship of those who were deemed "undesirable", applying to anyone who had been given citizenship by the Weimar government. Those who saw the results of this law first were the "150,000 Eastern Jews in Germany".

=== Hereditary Farm Law ===
Passed on September 29, 1933, this law "excluded Jews from owning farmland or engaging in agriculture". It stated that only Germans could now be farmers. Though the law had minimal effect due to the lack of Jews involved in farming, it still displayed a central idea of the Nazi party that, "The Reich government passes this law to secure the peasant foundations of our blood line through instituting the ancient customs of land inheritance."

=== Establishment of the Chambers of Culture ===
On September 29, 1933, the power of Jewish Cultural life in Germany was transferred to Joseph Goebbels, who established chambers of culture that would regulate activity in their chamber of either film, theater, music, fine arts, literature, broadcasting, and the press. The chambers of the different genres of culture were combined in their umbrella body, the Reich Chamber of Culture.

Each Chamber had the power to exclude anyone involved in any of the facets of culture, even without an "Aryan clause" written into the legislation.

For example, the film chamber could dismiss any Jews involved in any stages of the film-making process including the "producer, actors and ticket collectors in the theater". To continue involvement in the film industry one would need "licensed permission from the chamber president".

As a supplement to the Chambers of Culture, a journalism law went into effect on October 4, 1933, stating that to produce work for the press, journalists and editors would also need specific legal permission.

== Nuremberg Laws ==
At their annual party rally held in Nuremberg, 10 to 16 September 1935, the Nazi leaders announced a set of three new laws to further regulate and exclude Jews from German society. These laws now known as the Nuremberg laws served also as the legality for the arrests and violence against Jews that would follow.

The Nuremberg Laws were created in response to Hitler's demands for broadened citizenship laws that could "underpin the more specifically racial-biological anti-Jewish legislation". They were made to reflect the party principles that had been outlined in the points Hitler had written in the National Socialist Program in 1920.

=== Reich Flag Law ===
The first law stated that black, red, and white were the national colors, and the swastika flag was the new national flag. Per Hitler, this law was stated to "re-pay a debt of gratitude to the movement, under whose symbol Germany regained its freedom, in that they fulfill a significant item on the program of the National Socialist Party".

=== Citizenship Law ===
The second law established who would be granted full political and civic rights and those who would now be deprived of them. Citizenship rights were to be granted to those who were citizens of the Reich, which were only individuals classified as being of "German or related blood"; therefore, Jews were excluded from any and all citizenship rights, becoming Staatsangehörige or state subjects, essentially making them foreigners in their own country.

=== The Law for the Defense of German Blood and Honour ===
The third law forbade marriage and any intimate extramarital relations between Jews and non-Jewish German citizens (the latter denigrated as race disgrace). While the law left existing marriages between non-Jewish and Jewish spouses unaffected, it banned future such marriages and declared marriages by a non-Jewish German and a Jewish spouse of any nationality contracted after that ban outside of Germany invalid within the Reich. Furthermore, Jews were forbidden from employing non-Jewish German women or women of equivalent racist ranking who were under 45 years old. Under this law, Jews were also forbidden to raise the German flag.

=== Supplemental Decrees ===
After the Nuremberg Laws were passed, the Nazi Party also introduced supplemental decrees to the Citizenship Law and the Law for the Defense of German Blood and Honor to specifically outline who would be considered a Jew, and who would therefore be subject to the Nuremberg Laws' exclusionary principles.

On November 14, the first supplemental decree was published, and it defined a Jew as anyone who had at least three full Jewish grandparents, had two Jewish parents and were married to a Jewish spouse, belonged to the Jewish religion at the time of the law's publication, or who entered the Jewish religion later. Mischlinge or the German legal term for those who had "Aryan" and Jewish blood, were also clarified to determine who would be considered a Jew. Those that were three-quarters Jewish were Jewish as well as those who were half Jewish due to their choice of becoming Jewish via a Jewish spouse or through joining a Jewish community.

A second decree was published on December 21, which stated that Jewish professors, teachers, physicians, lawyers, and notaries who were state employees, and had previously been exempt, would now be dismissed from their positions.

In the first decree to the Law for the Defense of German Blood and Honour, it stated which specific marriages were forbidden. These included those "between a Jew and a Mischling with one Jewish Grandparent, between a Mischling and another each with one Jewish Grandparent, and between a Mischling with two Jewish Grandparents and a German".

== Post-Nuremberg legislation ==
=== 1936 Berlin Olympic Games ===
In order to prevent foreign criticism of Germany, and keep the 1936 Olympics in Berlin, and to prevent economic loss and a blow to German prestige, Hitler eased the anti-Jewish stance momentarily.

On December 3 1935, all anti-Jewish signs near the site of the Winter Olympics in Garmisch-Partenkirchen were ordered to be removed by Hitler. It was only an action taken to ensure the Olympics would be held in Germany by preventing international disapproval.

=== Second wave of anti-Jewish legislation, 1938–1939 ===
After the Nuremberg Legislations and during 1938, "worse than total expropriation was to follow: Economic harassment and even violence would henceforward be used to force the Jews to flee the Reich or the newly annexed Austria. Within the second phase, 1938 was the fateful turning point."

De-certification of all Jewish physicians, who were no longer allowed to treat German patients and forced to refer to themselves as "sick-treaters", a degrading term.

March 22, 1938 Jews were forbidden from owning private gardens.

July 27, 1938 A decree was enforced stating all streets in Germany needed to be renamed.

November 12, 1938 Jews were forbidden from attending movie theaters, the opera, and concerts.

November 15, 1938 Jewish children barred from attending public school.

The essential robbery of Jews became legal when Jews were forced on February 21, 1939, to turn in all jewelry of any value.

In this second wave of legislation, Jews were ostracized even further from society, with strict restrictions living under "a German regime that practiced terror and arbitrariness through the judicial system".

== Kristallnacht ==
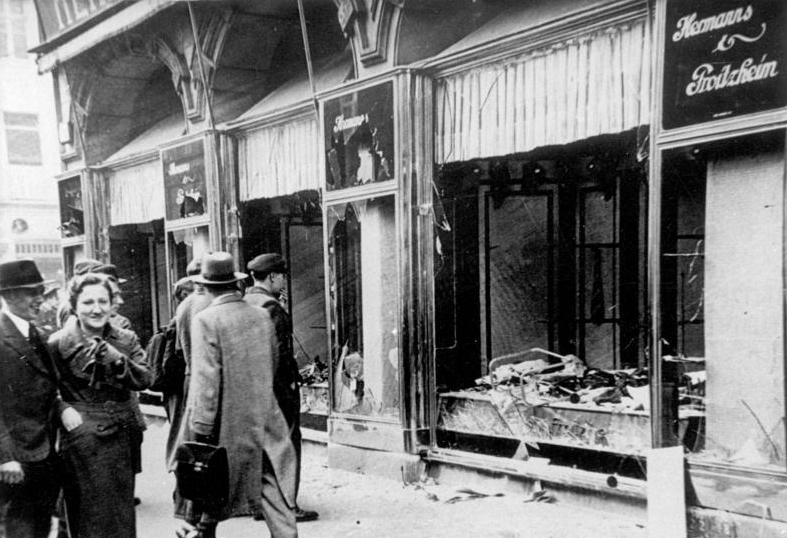
Kristallnacht, example of physical damage

Kristallnacht, or the "night of broken glass", refers to Jewish pogroms that took place on November 9 and 10 in 1938. The wave of violence occurred in Germany, annexed Austria, and areas of Sudetenland that were occupied by Germany. These attacks targeted synagogues, Jewish-owned businesses, other Jewish establishments, and Jewish citizens in general. More than 100 Jewish people were killed, and thousands more were arrested during these attacks. This was the start of organized Nazi attacks, and the mass incarceration of the Jews. There were no clear instructions on how to execute the violence, so it caused the destroying of Jewish property and inhumane treatment of Jewish people. The rioters destroyed 267 synagogues throughout Germany, Austria, and Sudetenland. Firefighters were instructed to prevent the flames from spreading to nearby buildings, but not to put the fires out on the burning synagogues. There were also about 7,500 Jewish-owned establishments that were robbed and had their windows shattered. About 30,000 Jewish men were arrested and moved to prisons or concentration camps as well. The German government placed full blame on the Jews for the destructions and imposed a fine of one billion Reichsmark on the Jewish community. The government took away all insurance payouts that would go to the Jews whose businesses or homes got destroyed. This left the Jews responsible for the costs of all repairs.

This led to many decrees in the weeks following. These decrees were designed to deprive the Jews of their means of living. Many of these movements enforced "Aryanization" policy. This meant that Jewish-owned property would be transferred to "Aryan" ownership for a fraction of the true value. To further remove the Jews from public life, the Jews were expelled from attending German schools, and they lost the right to have a driver's license or own an automobile.

Kristallnacht was essentially the turning point in the Nazis persecution of the Jewish people. It expanded the efforts to remove Jews from German economic and social life. It also led to forced emigration of Jews in order to make Germany free of Jews. Kristallnacht and the events that followed it showed the Nazi regime that they could count on the nationwide support of anti-Semitism from the general public. This showed the Nazis that they could easily move forward with their plans without much opposition from within Germany. The events of Kristallnacht foreshadowed the Holocaust and mass murders of the Jewish people.

== Timeline of anti-Jewish legislation and movements in pre-war Germany ==
During the pre-war Nazi Germany period (1933-1939) there were more than 400 laws, decrees and other type of regulations whose goal was to restrict Jews. There were national laws that affected all Jews, and there were state, region and city laws that only affected the Jews in those communities. These regulations limited Jews in all aspects of life, both public and private. Almost all people were involved in the support of anti-Jewish legislation in some way, whether it was passive agreement or direct involvement. These movements were all part of Hitler's intention and plan to rid the planet of all Jewish population. Hitler's plan started with stripping all Jews of their basic rights, before moving into the mass murdering of the Jewish people.

For sake of completeness, this timeline includes selected decrees that directly follow-up on pre-war legislation, which were issued after the start of World War II on September 1, 1939.

Date	Legislation or Decree	Description	Ref.
Mar 24, 1933	Law to Remedy the Distress of People and Reich	Commonly known as the Enabling Act, the law ended democracy in Germany. It gave the government the power to govern legislation by decree. It gave them the legal right to make discriminatory policies in the future. Hitler was allowed to make laws that violated the Weimar constitution without the approval of the parliament or Reich President with this act.	
Mar 31, 1933		A decree in the city of Berlin said that Jewish doctors were suspended from the city's charity services.	
Apr 7, 1933	Law for the Restoration of the Professional Civil Service	This law removed many Jews from government service: until 1935, the law had an exemption for German Jews who had fought for Germany during World War I.	
Apr 7, 1933	Law on the Admission to the Bar	This law prevented Jews from taking the bar exam, which is a test needed to become a lawyer.	
Apr 21, 1933	Law/Decree on the Slaughter of Animals	This law and its accompanying decree banned Kosher slaughter (shechita) from May 1: the decree contained detailed regulations on the general conduct of animal slaughter.	
Apr 25, 1933	Law against Overcrowding in German Schools and Universities	This law limited the number of Jewish students in public schools to no more than 5% of the total student population. The schools helped to spread Hitler's ideas. They taught students to love Hitler and to obey the authorities.	
May 12, 1933		Bernheim petition to League of Nations, based on article 147 of the 1922 German–Polish Accord on East Silesia, leads to vacation of most racial provisions of Nazi laws in German Upper Silesia.	
Jul 14, 1933		The Jewish people lost citizenship because of a De-Naturalization Law. This took citizenship away from all Jews, including naturalized Jews and "undesirables".	
Oct 4, 1933		The Jews were banned from editorial posts by a law on editors.	
1934		The national Nazi Government forbade Jewish actors from performing on the stage or the screen.	
1934		Local governments issued regulations on other aspects of Jewish life. The Jews were no longer allowed to slaughter animals, which prevented them from obeying Jewish dietary laws.	
May 21, 1935		A law was made on military participation that outlawed Jewish officers in the army.	
Sep 15, 1935	Nuremberg Laws	The Nuremberg Laws excluded Jews from having citizenship and marrying or having sex with German women and deprived Jews of basic political rights such as voting rights, and the right to hold a political office. The laws also restricted the Jews economically by making it difficult for the Jews to make money. The laws reduced Jewish-owned businesses in Germany by two-thirds. Under the Mischling Test, individuals were considered Jewish if they had at least one Jewish grandparent.	
Jan 11, 1936		An Executive Order on the Reich Tax Law forbade Jews from being tax consultants.	
Apr 3, 1936		Jews were banned from the veterinary profession by the Reich Veterinarians Law.	
Aug 1–16, 1936	1936 Summer Olympics in Berlin		
Oct 15, 1936		The Reich Ministry of Education banned Jewish teachers from teaching in public schools.	
Apr 9, 1937		The mayor of Berlin ordered public schools not to allow Jewish students to attend until further notice.	
Jul 15, 1937		Racial laws applied in German Upper Silesia following the automatic lapse of article 147 of the 1922 German–Polish Accord on East Silesia.	
Jan 5, 1938	Law on the Alteration of Family and Personal Names	This law banned Jews from changing their names.	
Feb 5, 1938		A law on the profession of auctioneering banned Jews from being auctioneers.	
Mar 18, 1938		Jewish gun merchants were excluded by the Gun Law.	
Apr 22, 1938	Decree against the Camouflage of Jewish Firms	Jewish-owned businesses were forbidden from changing their names. This decree's goal was to protect against the camouflage of Jewish businesses.	
Apr 26, 1938	Decree on the Registration of Jewish Property	Jewish people were required to declare all property worth over 5,000 reichsmarks: the deadline was extended once, from June 30 to July 31.	
May 31, 1938	Decree on the Reorganisation of the Austrian Civil Service	The Law for the Restoration of the Professional Civil Service was extended to Austria.	
Jul 11, 1938		The Reich Ministry of the Interior banned the Jews from health spas.	
Jul 23, 1938	Third Decree on Compulsory Identification Cards	Jews were issued identity cards with a letter "J" stamped on it.	
Jul 25, 1938	Fourth Decree to the Reich Citizenship Law	Jewish doctors were decertified after September 30, and were banned from treating anyone other than Jews.	
Aug 17, 1938	Second Decree to implement the Law on the Alteration of Family and Personal Names	An executive order on the law on the Alteration of Family and Personal Names required all Jews to adopt names. For women, "Sara"; and for men, "Israel".	
Sep 27, 1938	Fifth Decree to the Reich Citizenship Law	Jewish lawyers were decertified after November 30.	
Oct 5, 1938	Decree on Jewish Passports	The Reich Interior Ministry revoked all German passports owned by Jews: they had to get a new passport with a letter "J" stamped on it.	
Nov 9/10, 1938	Kristallnacht		
Nov 12, 1938	Decree on Atonement by Jews of German Citizenship	Göring blamed German Jews for the Kristallnacht, and collectively fined them one billion reichsmarks.	
Nov 12, 1938	Decree on the Elimination of Jews from German Economic Life	All Jewish-owned businesses were closed.	
Nov 12, 1938	Decree on the Restoration of the Streets by Jewish Economic Enterprises		
Nov 15, 1938		All Jewish children were expelled from public schools by the Reich Ministry of Education.	
Nov 21, 1938	Implementing Decree on Atonement by Jews	This decree required all Jews with assets of more than 5,000 reichsmarks to pay 20% of it in four instalments to their tax office, by August 15, 1939.	
Nov 28, 1938		The freedom of movement was highly restricted by the Reich Interior Ministry.	
Nov 29, 1938	First Decree to implement and supplement the Pigeon Law	The Reich Interior Ministry banned Jews from keeping carrier pigeons.	
Dec 14, 1938		An executive order on the Law on the Organization of National Work canceled all state contracts held with Jewish-owned firms in order to attack the Jews economically.	
Dec 21, 1938	Law on Midwives	This law banned all Jews from being midwives.	
Feb 21, 1939	Third Order based on the Decree on the Registration of Jewish Property	The decree required Jews to surrender precious metals and stones that they owned, within two weeks: the deadline was extended once, to March 31.	
Aug 1, 1939		The president of the German Lottery outlawed the sale of lottery tickets to Jews.	
Sep 1, 1939	World War II begins with the invasion of Poland		
Oct 19, 1939	Second Implementing Decree on Atonement by Jews	The Reich demanded a fifth instalment for the Jewish Capital Levy, due on 15 November 1939.	

== See also ==
- Reich Flight Tax
- Aryanization
- The Holocaust
