= Mischling Test =

Legal test for Jews in Nazi Germany

The Mischling Test was the legal test under Nazi Germany's Nuremberg Laws that to determine whether a person was a "Jew" or a Mischling (mixed-blood).

== Background ==
On 11 April 1933 the regime promulgated the First Supplementary Decree for the Execution of the Law of Restoration of the Professional Civil Service, colloquially known as the First Racial Definition. This implementing decree stipulated that a person would be regarded as a racial Jew for purposes of the law if he had one Jewish parent or one Jewish grandparent, i.e. if the ancestor was "of the Jewish faith."

Under the law, Jews were to be discharged from the civil service, unless they had been employed since before World War I or unless they had fought on the front lines in the war, or had a father or son who had been killed in the war.

The "one Jewish grandparent" rule was predominant for a period of time in the Third Reich, and had typically been the test incorporated into the Aryan Paragraph, which had been in currency before Hitler's assumption of power on 30 January 1933. However, various social and political factions militated in favor of a new set of discriminatory laws, which were forthcoming at the NSDAP party rally in 1935 in Nuremberg.

The Nuremberg Laws, as originally promulgated in September 1935, used the term "Jew" but did not define the term. The definition of the term was problematic for the Nazis and it was not until the issuance of a supplementary regulation in mid-November 1935 that a legal test that was specific to the Nuremberg laws was formally published.

The original draftsmen of the Nuremberg Laws, puzzled over the problem and pressed for a quick solution, solved it by the simple expedient of limiting the meaning of the term to encompass only "full Jews" (German: Volljuden). This test was relatively easy to state and apply, but Hitler vetoed the idea, without stipulating what he wanted as a replacement.

Meetings among Government and Party officials after the September 1933 annual Nuremberg party rally revealed the existence of two factions:

- the radicals, generally non-government party officials, who wanted a broad meaning of the term "Jew," with the concomitant effect of a stricter standard for having "German blood." Their focus was ideological and their justification was the extreme Hitlerian rhetoric of the last ten years. The radicals wanted "quarter-Jews" classified as "Jews": a person with one Jewish grandparent would be deemed "Jewish." Persons with less Jewish ancestry would be considered "Mischlinge."
- the pragmatists, generally government officials, who were concerned with foreign policy and international implications, including possible economic sanctions at a time that the economy of Nazi Germany was still fragile. Their view was that only persons with three or four Jewish grandparents would be classified as "Jewish," with others considered "Mischlinge."

The resulting compromise was implemented by the First Supplementary Decree. The practical application of "mischling" first and second degree were further elaborated in the Wannsee Conferences and meetings on the "final solution".

== Categories ==
The First Supplementary Decree of 14 November 1935 (Decree) addressed this issue by defining three categories:

- Persons of German or kindred blood
- Jews
- Persons of mixed Jewish blood (Mischlinge)

By applying the test, a person would be classified into exactly one of the preceding categories.

== The test ==
The Decree sets up the legal test defined here.

=== Part one ===
The first part of the test is implemented by setting up three categories as follows:

- A person with 3 or more Jewish grandparents is considered to be a Jew.
- A person with exactly two Jewish grandparents is considered to be either a Jew or a Mischling of the first degree (discussed below, second part of test)
- A person with only one Jewish grandparent is considered to be a Mischling of the second degree.

=== Part two ===
The remaining problem was the treatment of a person with two Jewish and two non-Jewish grandparents. This leads to the second part of the test, which has four subdivisions. A person with exactly two Jewish grandparents was deemed a Jew (specifically, a Geltungsjude) if either:

- (a) he is a member of the Jewish religious community on 14 November 1935 or later becomes a member; or
- (b) he is married to a Jew on 14 November 1935 or later marries a Jew; or
- (c) his parents were married on or after 17 September 1935, and one of his parents is Jewish; or
- (d) he is born out of wedlock after 31 July 1936, and one of his parents is Jewish.

If such a person is not classified as a Jew under any of these four subtests, then he is a Mischling of the 1st degree (by the terms of Part One).

== Examples ==
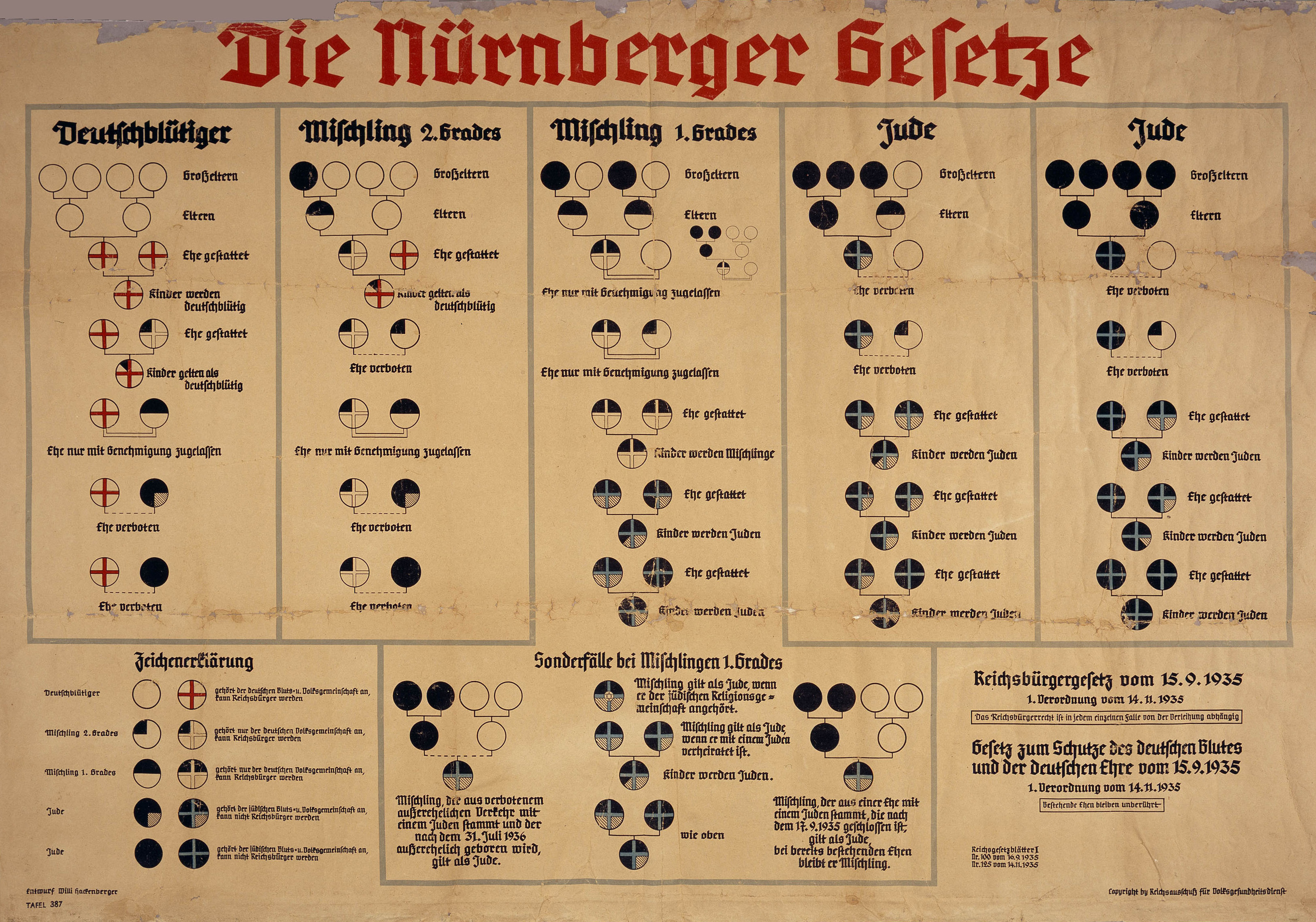
Racial classification chart based on the Nuremberg Laws

The following Examples demonstrate how Part Two of the Decree's legal test operates. Remember that in every case, X always has exactly two Jewish grandparents. Unless this initial condition applies, there is no point in applying these tests, as the categorization into the three basic classes (Jew, Mischling, German) is only complicated in the case of "exactly two" Jewish grandparents.

=== Test A ===
- X had always worshiped as a Jew but on 1 November 1935 he converted to Catholicism. He is a Mischling (1st degree) as a result. If he had waited two more weeks to convert, he would be classified as (and would always remain) a Jew.
- X had left the Jewish religious community but rejoins it on 1 December 1935. He was a Mischling but on 1 December he will be classified as a Jew.

=== Test B ===
- X had been married to a Jew for years but on 1 November 1935, their divorce becomes final. He is a Mischling (1st degree) as a result. If the divorce proceedings had lasted for two more weeks, he would be classified as (and would always remain) a Jew.
- X was a lifelong bachelor but married a Jew on 1 December, 1935. He was a Mischling but on December 1 he will be classified as a Jew.

=== Test C ===
- X has one Jewish and one non-Jewish parent and they are married 15 September 1935. He is born two years thereafter. He is a Mischling (1st degree). Same result if he is born on 1 October 1935.
- X has one Jewish and one non-Jewish parent and they are married 15 October 1935. He is born two years thereafter. He is classified as a Jew. Same result if he is born 1 November 1935.

=== Test D ===
- X has one Jewish and one non-Jewish parent, who never marry right. He is born 10 August 1936. He is classified as a Jew. If he had been born two weeks earlier (e.g. 27 July 1936), he may have been classified as a Mischling (1st degree), depending on when his parents married (or if they did at all).
- X has one Jewish and one non-Jewish parent. He is born 27 July 1936.

- if his parents were married on 15 September 1935, he is a Mischling (1st degree).
- if his parents were married on 15 October 1935, he is a Jew.
- if his parents never marry, he is a Mischling (1st degree).

== See also ==
- Ahnenpass
- Antisemitism
- Fruit machine (homosexuality test)
- Geltungsjude
- Holocaust
- Metic
- Pencil test (South Africa)
- One-drop rule
