= Aryan certificate =

Nazi-era document which certified one's membership of the alleged Aryan race

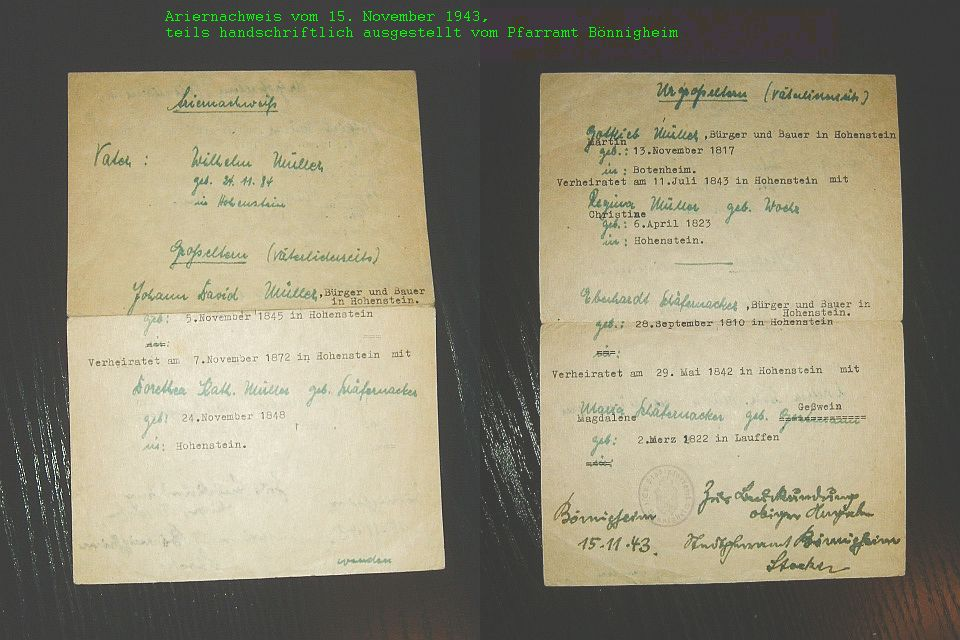
A 1943 Ariernachweis

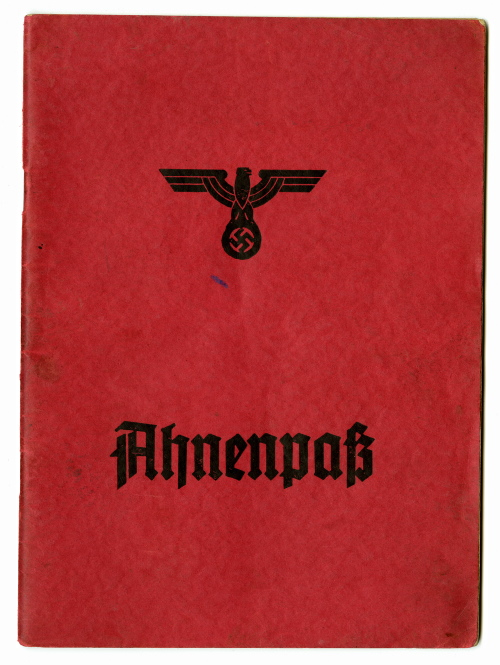
Ahnenpaß

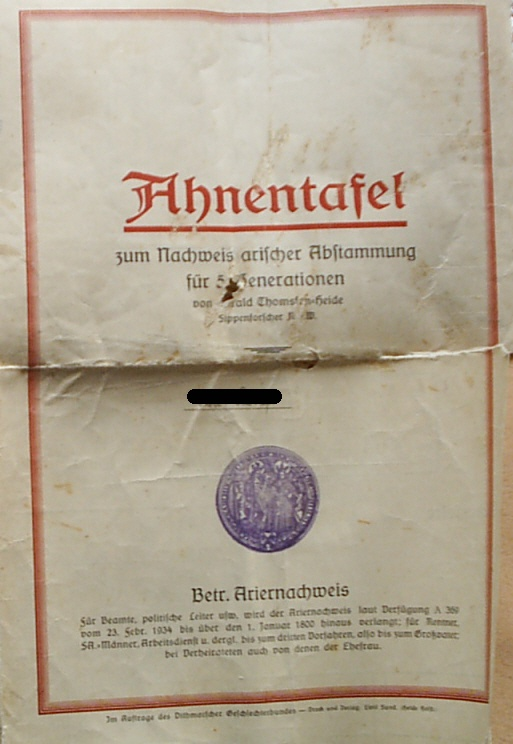
Ahnentafel used as Ariernachweis

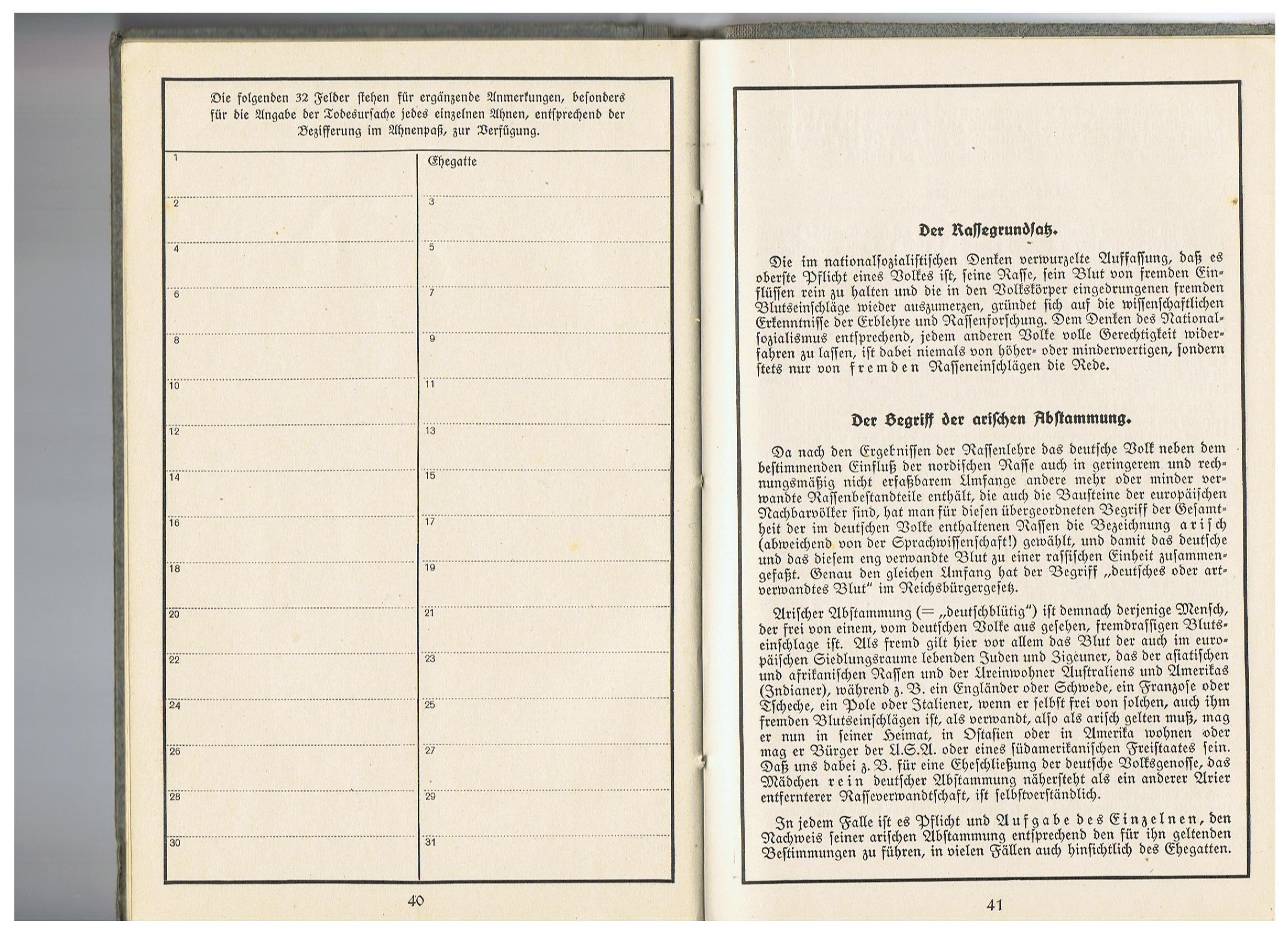
Page 41: "The Racial Principle / The concept of Aryan descent" ("an Englishman ... or Czech, a Pole ... akin to an Aryan")

In Nazi Germany, the Aryan certificate or Aryan passport (German: Ariernachweis) was a document which certified that a person was a member of the presumed Aryan race. Beginning in April 1933, it was required from all employees and officials in the public sector, including education, according to the Law for the Restoration of the Professional Civil Service. It was also a primary requirement to become a Reich citizen for those who were of German or related blood (Aryan) and wanted to become Reich citizens after the Nuremberg Laws were passed in 1935. A "Swede or an Englishman, a Frenchman or Czech, a Pole or Italian" was considered to be of related blood to the Germans, that is, "Aryan".

There were two main types:

- Kleiner Ariernachweis (Lesser Aryan certificate) was one of:
  - Seven birth or baptism certificates (or a combination of both) (the person, his parents and grandparents) and three marriage certificates (parents and grandparents) or certified proofs thereof:
    - Ahnenpaß (literally ancestor's passport)
    - Ahnentafel, a certified genealogy table
- Großer Ariernachweis (Greater Aryan certificate) was required for compliance with the requirements of the Reichserbhofgesetz (land heritage law) and membership in the Nazi party. This certificate had to trace the family pedigree back to 1800 (to 1750 for SS officers). According to the especially strict regulation of this law which included the goal of "Preserving the Purity of German Blood," the only eligible were those who could prove (reaching back to 1 January 1800) that "none of their paternal nor their maternal ancestors had Jewish or colored blood".

The Nazis justified their racial legalisation by stating:

In line with National Socialist thinking which does full justice to all other peoples, there is never the expression of superior or inferior, but alien racial admixtures.

== Legal relevance today ==
Like other documents issued by public authorities at the time, the Aryan certificate was an official government document. As such, it still has evidentiary value in legal proceedings today, similar to how an expired East German passport can be used to support a claim of German citizenship.

== See also ==
- Aryan clause
- German Blood Certificate, for Mischlinge (people of mixed origin)
  - Ahnenpass
- Italian Fascism and racism
- Limpieza de sangre
- Nazi racial theories
- Nuremberg Laws
- Racial policy of Nazi Germany
- Bryan Mark Rigg
