= Wade Clark Roof =

American sociologist (b. 1939, d. 2019)

Wade Clark Roof (July 25, 1939 - August 24, 2019) was an American sociologist and academic. He was the J. F. Rowny Professor of Religion and Society at the University of California. He was a key figure in the founding of Walter H. Capps Center for the Study of Ethics, Religion, and Public Life. His research focused on American religious life. He won the Association for the Sociology of Religion's Lifetime Achievement Award for Contributions to the Sociology of Religion in 2018.

== Early life and education ==
Roof grew up in the Sandhills region of South Carolina. Clark earned a bachelor of art degree from Wofford College in 1961, M Div. from Yale Divinity School in 1964 and an M.A. in 1969. He studied for his PhD at the University of North Carolina at Chapel Hill graduating in 1971.

== Career ==
He joined the University of California, Santa Barbara as J. F. Rowny Professor of Religion and Society in 1989. At the university, his research contributed significantly to the understanding of changing American religious life. His focus on sociology of religion and studies on liberal or mainline Protestantism brought him to intellectual limelight. His 1993 book: A generation of Seekers which focused on changing spiritualities amongst baby boomers was received with critical acclaim earning him appearances on national media. He later became a religion analyst with NBC, CBS and PBS.

Roof retired in 2013. He won the Association for the Sociology of Religion's Lifetime Achievement Award for Contributions to the Sociology of Religion in 2018. In 2019, he was posthumously awarded the Martin E. Marty Public Understanding of Religion Award presented by the American Academy of Religion.

Roof died on 24 August 2019.

== Books ==
- A Generation of Seekers: The Spiritual Journeys of the Baby Boom Generation (1993)
- Spiritual Marketplace: Baby Boomers and the Remaking of American Religion
- with William McKinney American Mainline Religion: Its Changing Shape and Future
- with Jackson W. Carroll Bridging Divided Worlds

- editor The Post-war Generation And The Establishment Of Religion
