= Ahnenpass =

Certificate in Nazi Germany

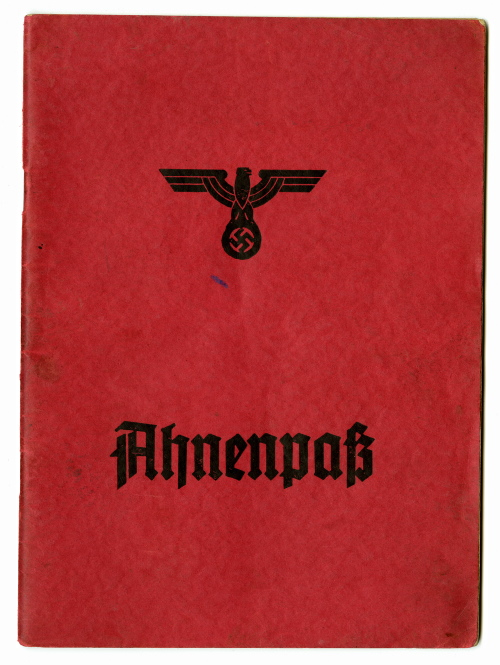
Front page of an Ahnenpass, with a Parteiadler (Eagle of the Party) of the NSDAP, looking on its left

Inner page of the Ahnenpass of Dutch rower Tjapko van Bergen, with a Reichsadler (Eagle of the Reich) of the Nazi Germany, looking on its right

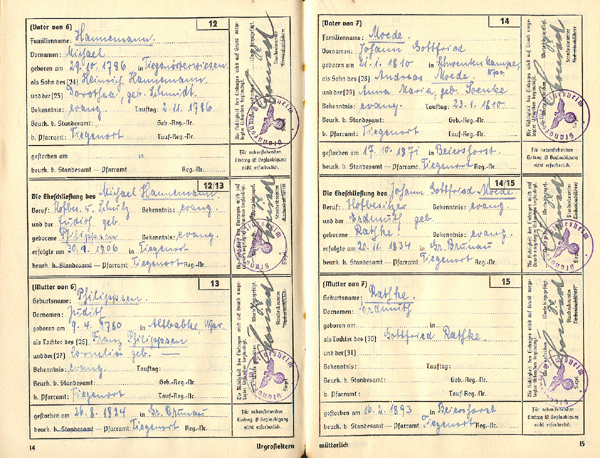
Pages of an Ahnenpass

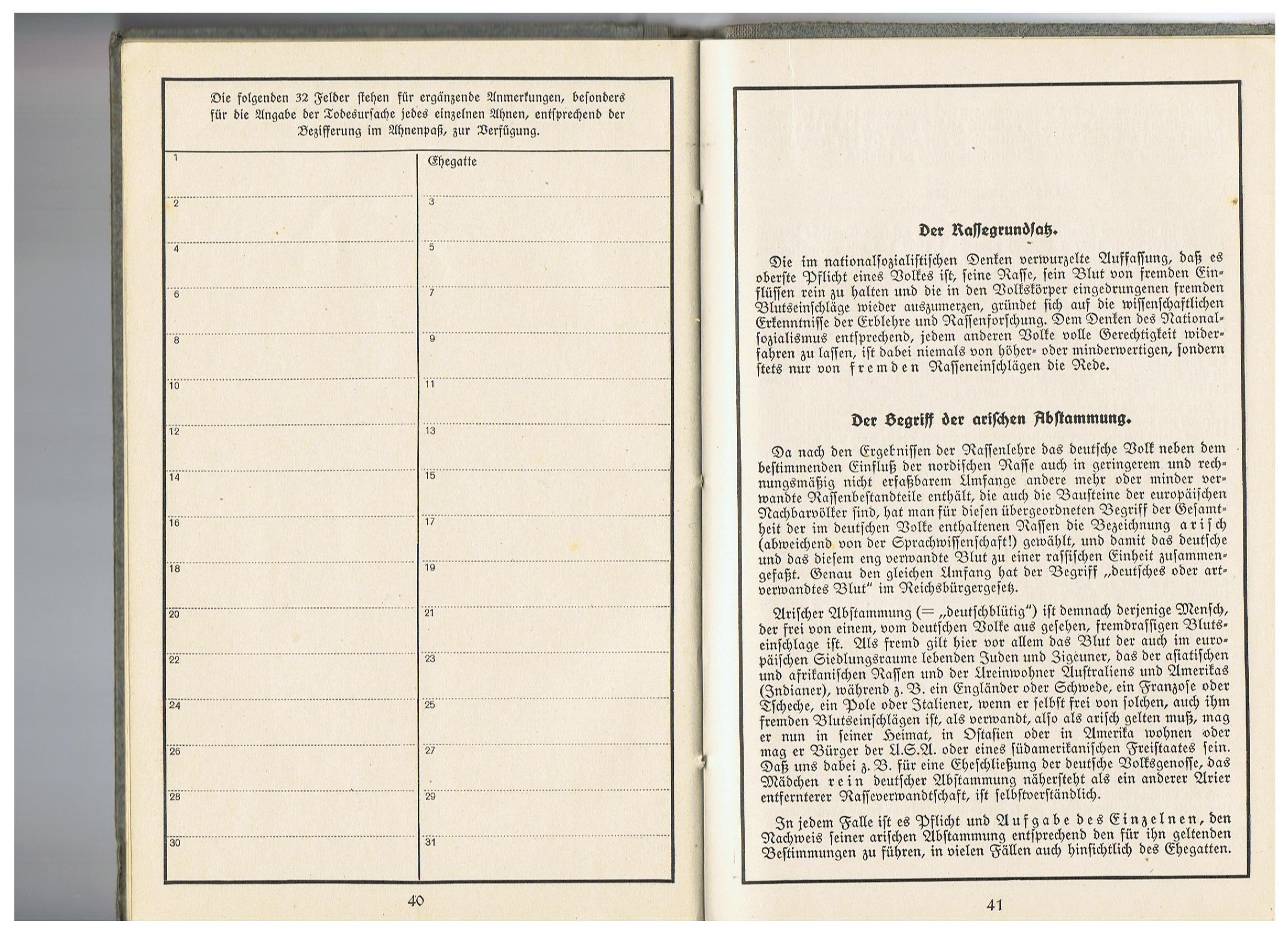
Page 41

The Ahnenpaß (literally, "ancestor pass") documented the Aryan lineage of people "of German blood" in Nazi Germany. It was one of the forms of the Aryan certificate (Ariernachweis) and issued by the "Reich Association of Marriage Registrars in Germany" (Reichsverband der Standesbeamten in Deutschland e. V.).

The term Aryan in this context was used in a sense widely accepted in the "race science" of the time, which considered that there was a Caucasian race which was sub-divided into Semitic, Hamitic, and Aryan (Japhetic) subraces, the latter corresponding to the Indo-European language family. The Nazi ideology limited the category Aryan to specific subgroups, while excluding Slavs as non-Aryan. The actual primary objective was to create extensive profiling based on racial data.

The investigation for lineage was not obligatory, as it was a significant undertaking to research the original documents for birth and marriage. Many Nazi followers had already begun to research their lineage even before the law required it (soon after the NSDAP took power on 30 January 1933).

One important law, issued on 7 April 1933 (after the Nazi assumption of power), was called the Law for the Restoration of the Professional Civil Service, and it required all public servants to be of Aryan descent. The law, however, did not define the term "Aryan" and a subsequent regulation was issued on 11 April as the first legal attempt by the Nazi government to define who was, and who was not, a Jew. Germans aspiring for the document had to prove they were of Aryan descent. The Ahnenpass could be issued to citizens of other countries if they were of "German blood", and the document stated that Aryans could be located "wherever they might live in the world". The Reichsgesetzblatt (Reich Law Gazette) referred to people of "German or racially related blood" rather than just "of German blood".

The many Poles, Czechs, and others of German descent in other countries were known as Volksdeutsche, and Aryan.

The Expert Advisor for Population and Racial Policy redefined "Aryan" as someone who is "tribally" related to "German blood". The implementing decree followed the pre-Nazi trend found in the Aryan Paragraph and read in pertinent part that:

"Als nicht arisch gilt, wer von nicht arischen, insbesondere jüdischen Eltern oder Großeltern abstammt. Es genügt, wenn ein Elternteil oder ein Großelternteil nicht arisch ist. Dies ist insbesondere dann anzunehmen, wenn ein Elternteil oder ein Großelternteil der jüdischen Religion angehört hat."

Translation: "Those who descend from non-Aryan, especially Jewish, parents or grandparents, are considered non-Aryan. It is sufficient [grounds for exclusion] for one parent or grandparent to be non-Aryan. This should especially be assumed if a parent or grandparent adhered to the Jewish religion."

The applicable fields were later enlarged under different laws to include lawyers, teachers, and medical doctors, and required a proven Aryan lineage even to attend high school or get married. Usually, the lineage was investigated two generations back. The Ahnenpass cost 0.6 Reichsmarks.

Holding an Ahnenpass was not on record; the document was shown whenever proof of Aryan descent was required. The Aryan proof had to be provided, for example, in the context of the South Tyrol Option Agreement, for which a special office was set up in Bolzano, a so-called Sippenkanzlei, under the direction of Franz Sylvester Weber.

Due to the need for Ahnenpasses, genealogical research flourished in Nazi Germany. Opposition clergy helped many racially persecuted individuals by providing them with false certificates of ancestry necessary for survival.

== See also ==
- Nuremberg laws
- German Blood Certificate
- Nazi eugenics
- Racial policy of Nazi Germany
- Rassenschande
- Mischling Test
- Limpieza de sangre
- Volksdeutsche
