= Frontkämpferprivileg =

Nazi exemption for Jewish soldiers

The Frontkämpferprivileg (front-line fighter's privilege) was an exemption granted by the government of Nazi Germany between 1933 and 1935 to German Jews who had fought for Germany during the First World War but faced dismissal from official posts under anti-Jewish legislation in prewar Nazi Germany.

The "Law for the Restoration of the Professional Civil Service" of 7 April 1933 aimed to force all "non-Aryans" to retire from the legal profession and civil service, and other anti-Jewish laws passed in 1933 sought to drive Jews out of other areas of public life. These moves prompted a protest from Captain Leo Löwenstein, the president of the Reich Association of Jewish Frontline Soldiers, who wrote to the Nazi leader Adolf Hitler to complain. He pointed out that of Germany's half-million Jewish population, 96,000 had served in the war and 12,000 had perished. He wrote:

After the blood sacrifices and services made to the homeland, we firmly believe that the German Jews are entitled to equal rights as citizens. However, it is with deep pain that we see how we are being dishonored and how wide circles of Jews are being deprived of the base of their economic existence.

It also met with the disapproval of Reich President Paul von Hindenburg, a former First World War Field Marshal, who wrote in a letter to Hitler:

In recent days, a number of cases have been reported to me in which judges, lawyers and court officials wounded in the war, with unblemished records, have been forced to retire and later have been discharged because they are of Jewish descent. For me, who with the explicit agreement of the government on the day of national awakening, on March 21, issued the proclamation to the German people in which I said I bowed reverentially before the dead and thought with gratitude on the survivors of the war, on the wounded and my old front-line comrades, such treatment of wounded Jewish officials is personally, absolutely insupportable.

Hindenburg insisted that Jewish former front-line soldiers and their sons must be allowed to continue in their jobs. The law of 7 April 1933 thus included a clause that exempted such people, creating the so-called Frontkämpferprivileg (front-line fighter privilege). To the surprise of the Nazis, nearly 50 per cent of the Jewish officials who faced dismissal were able to prove that they fell into this category. However, the privilege was abolished after Hindenburg's death when the Nuremberg Laws of 1935 instituted systematic discrimination against Jews and deprived them of citizenship.
