= Law for the Restoration of the Professional Civil Service =

Nazi-era law excluding Jews and anti-Nazis from German civil service

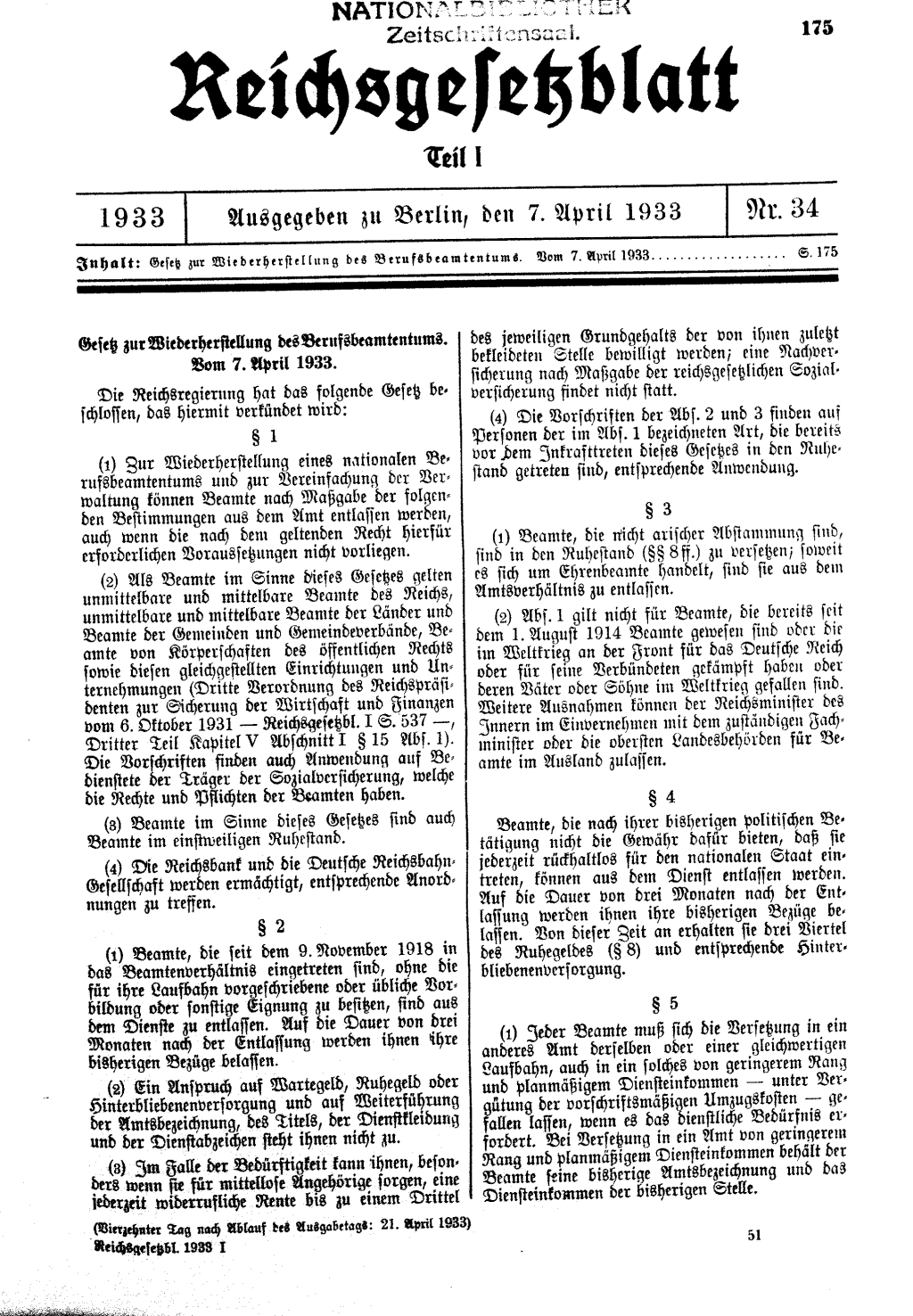
The promulgation of the law in the Reichsgesetzblatt

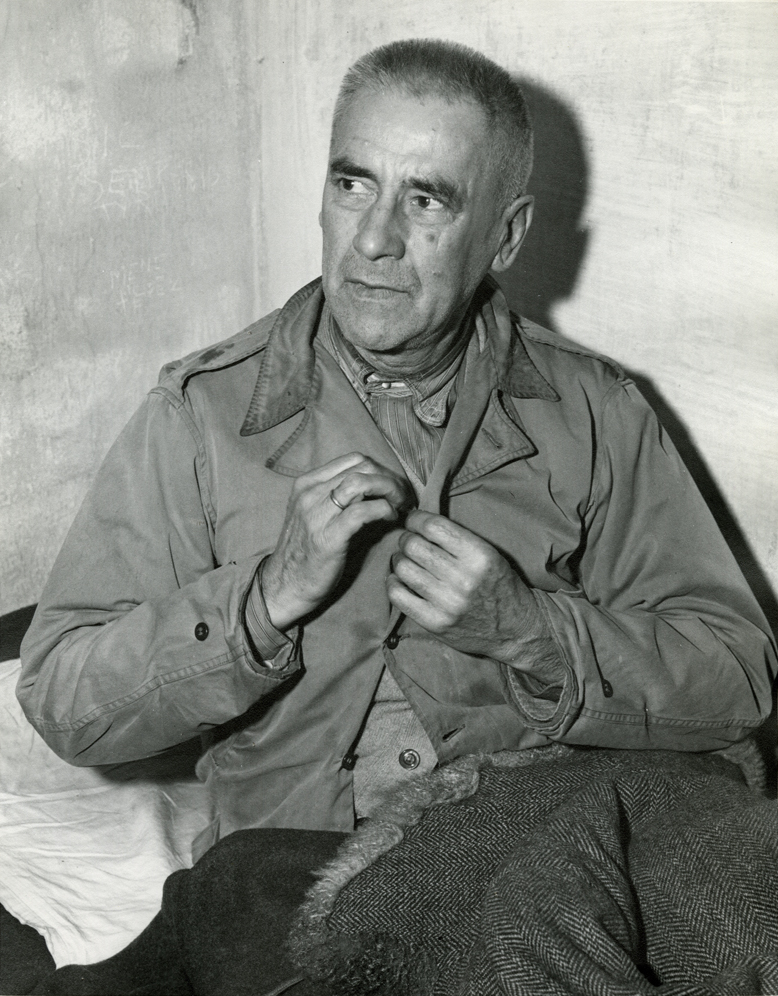
Wilhelm Frick in his cell at Nuremberg, November 1945

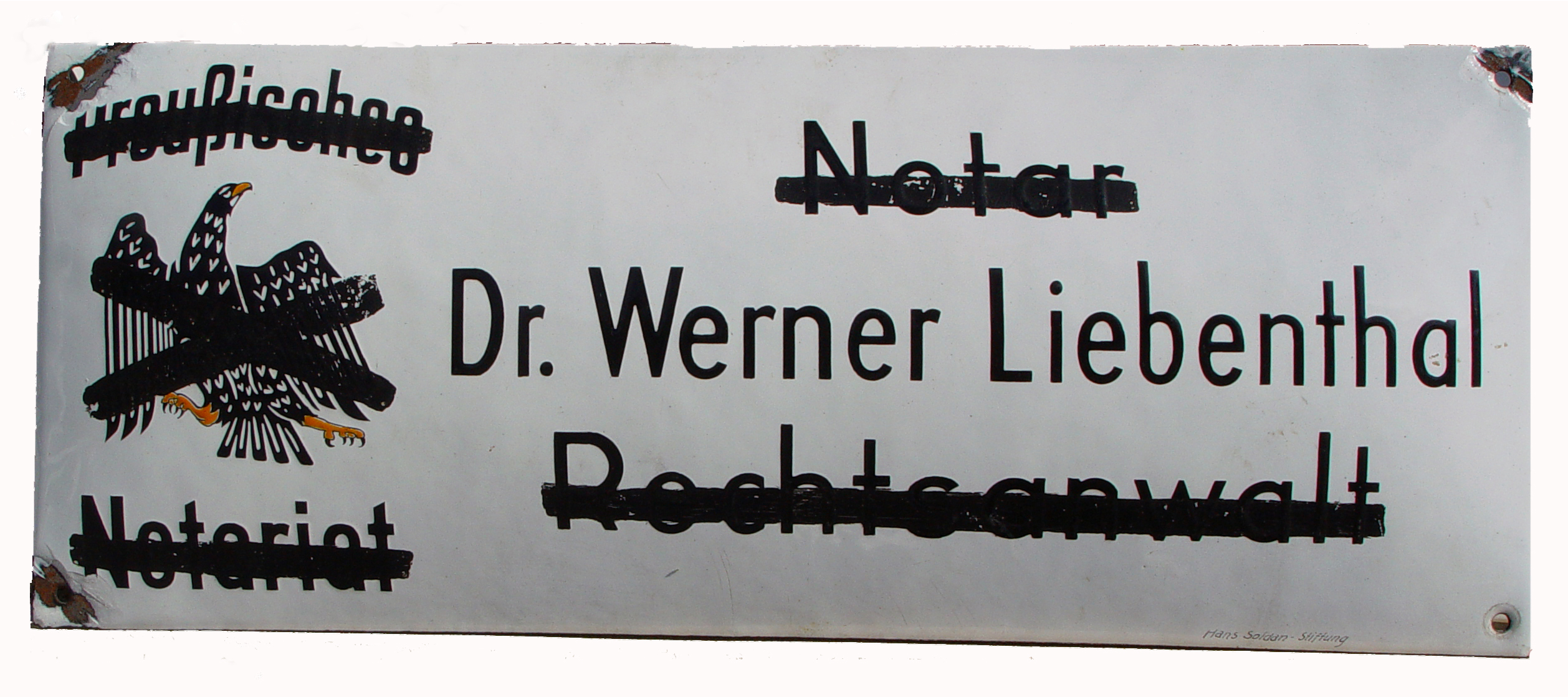
Nameplate of Dr. Werner Liebenthal, Notary & Advocate. The plate was hung outside his office on Martin Luther Str, Schöneberg, Berlin. In 1933, following the Law for the Restoration of the Professional Civil Service the plate was painted black by the Nazis, who boycotted Jewish owned offices.

The Law for the Restoration of the Professional Civil Service (German: Gesetz zur Wiederherstellung des Berufsbeamtentums, shortened to Berufsbeamtengesetz), also known as Civil Service Law, Civil Service Restoration Act, and Law to Re-establish the Civil Service, was enacted by the Nazi regime in Germany on 7 April 1933. This law, which followed Adolf Hitler's rise to power by two months and the promulgation of the Enabling Act by two weeks, constituted one of the earliest instances of antisemitic and racist legislation in Germany.

The primary objective of the law was to establish a "national" and "professional" civil service by dismissing certain groups of tenured civil servants. Individuals of non-Aryan origin, particularly those of Jewish descent, were compelled to retire, while members of the Communist Party or affiliated organizations were to be terminated from their positions. Additionally, the law forbade Jews, non-Aryans, and political opponents from holding positions as teachers, professors, judges, or within the government. Its reach extended to other professions such as lawyers, doctors, tax consultants, musicians, and notaries. Initially, the law sought the dismissal of all non-Aryan civil servants, but subsequent amendments were introduced to exempt World War I veterans, individuals serving since August 1914, and those who had lost family members in the war.

This law represented a significant turning point for German Jewry, prompting notable figures such as Albert Einstein to resign and emigrate prior to being forcibly expelled. Another provision aimed to remove personnel deemed unreliable due to their political beliefs. The legislation defined Aryan lineage and established a distinction between Aryans and non-Aryans. It also included provisions for compulsory retirement and the requirement of providing evidence of Aryan ancestry. A series of related ordinances were issued to implement the law and introduce further regulations.

This law was eventually replaced in full by the Nuremberg Laws in 1935.

== Articles of the law ==
Article 1 of the Law claimed that in order to re-establish a "national" and "professional" civil service, members of certain groups of tenured civil servants were to be dismissed. Civil servants who were not of Aryan descent were to retire. Non-Aryans were defined as someone descended from non-Aryans, especially those descended from Jewish parents, or grandparents. Members of the Communist Party, or any related or associated organisation were to be dismissed. This meant that Jews, other non-Aryans, and political opponents could not serve as teachers, professors, judges, or other government positions. Shortly afterwards, a similar law was passed concerning lawyers, doctors, tax consultants, musicians, and notaries.

As the law was first drafted by the Interior Minister Wilhelm Frick, all those of "non-Aryan descent" were to be fired immediately at the Reich, Länder and municipal levels of government. However, the President of Germany, Paul von Hindenburg objected to the bill until it had been amended to exclude three classes of civil servants from the ban:

- World War I veterans who had served at the front
- those who had been in the civil service continuously since 1 August 1914 (i.e. since the start of the War)
- those who lost a father or son in combat in the Great War

Hitler agreed to these amendments and the bill was signed into law on 7 April 1933. In practice, the amendments excluded most Jewish civil servants; after Hindenburg's death in 1934, the amendments were superseded completely by the Nuremberg Laws. Nonetheless, passage of the law was a crucial turning point in the history of German Jewry, for it marked the first time since the last German Jews had been emancipated in 1871 that an anti-Semitic law had been passed in Germany. In one particularly notable example of the law's effect, Albert Einstein resigned his position at the Prussian Academy of Sciences and emigrated to the United States before he could be expelled.

Article 4 of the Law ("Civil servants who, after their previous political activities, cannot guarantee that they will always stand up for the national state without reservation[…].") had the intention to remove all personnel that, because of their political views, could not be relied upon by the Party to execute its wishes (Gleichschaltung). This Article 4 affected all Germans irrespective of their "racial" origins.

== Content ==
Following the decree, Albert Gorter redefined the term 'Aryan' in the Aryan paragraph as:

The Aryans (also Indo-Germans, Japhetiten) are one of the three branches of the Caucasian (white race); they are divided into the western (European), that is the German, Roman, Greek, Slav, Lett, Celt [and] Albanesen, and the eastern (Asiatic) Aryans, that is the Indian (Hindu) and Iranian (Persian, Afghan, Armenian, Georgian, Kurd). Non-Aryans are therefore: 1. the members of two other races, namely the Mongolian (yellow) and the Negroid (black) races; 2. the members of the two other branches of the Caucasian race, namely the Semites (Jews, Arabs) and Hamites (Berbers). The Finns and the Hungarians belong to the Mongoloid race; but it is hardly the intention of the law to treat them as non-Aryans. Thus … the non-Jewish members of the European Volk are Aryans...

However, this definition was deemed unacceptable because it included certain specific non-Europeans. Achim Gercke later redefined this unacceptable definition as the one already used by the Expert Advisor for Population and Racial Policy which stated "An Aryan is one who is tribally related to German blood. An Aryan is the descendant of a Volk domiciled in Europe in a closed tribal settlement since recorded history." This new definition allowed the Civil Service Law to differentiate between 'Aryans' and 'non-Aryans'. However, the quantity of how much Jewish blood an individual was allowed to have until it was considered to damage the German Volk remained untenable.

(The following is translated from the German version of this page.) Political opponents of national socialism ("Officials who, on account of their past political activities cannot guarantee that they have always acted wholeheartedly for the national state") should either be forced into retirement or let go from their jobs.

Moreover, civil servants should be let go if they had started their jobs after 1918 and were now unable to demonstrate that they had acquired all the training necessary for their careers. These people were called "membership book officials (Parteibuch-Beamte)" in the language of National Socialist propaganda.

According to § 3 (1) of the "First Ordinance for the accomplishment of the Law for the Restoration of the Professional Civil Service, the first definition of a Jew was defined as:

A person is to be considered non-Aryan if he is descended from non-Aryan, and especially from Jewish parents or grandparents. It is sufficient if one parent or grandparent is non-Aryan. This is to be assumed in particular where one parent or grandparent was of the Jewish religion.

They could be let go or prematurely forced into retirement. According to § 3 (2), however, "non-Aryan" officials should be left in their positions if they had occupied those positions since a date before August 1914. Those Jewish civil servants who had a son or father who had been killed in the First World War were also spared from being sacked. This loophole also applied to "Frontkämpfer" (Front-line soldiers) (see Frontkämpferprivileg). All persons in the civil service would have to be able to produce the Ariernachweis (proof of Aryan ancestry) in order to prove that they had no ancestors of the Jewish race. This loophole was closed by the 1935 Nuremberg Laws. Jewish civil servants still holding their posts were given notice by 31 December 1935 at the latest.

According to § 6 of the law, civil servants could be forced into retirement without cause "for the simplification of administration". The vacant positions created by this action were not to be refilled.

In rapid succession numerous regulations were dispensed with, as well as many employees and labourers in civil service as well as in the Reichsbank.

Pensions were not allowed for all groups of people forced into the ranks of pensioners by this law. The guaranteed old-age pension was reduced in 1938 by the "Siebente Verordnung zum Reichsbürgergesetz".

On 1 September 1933, Frick issued the second supplementary decree of the law in attempt to define the terms "Aryan" and "non-Aryan":

In defining the concept of Aryan descent in accordance with section 3 of the Law for the Restoration of the Civil Service, it is not religion which is decisive, but rather descent, race, blood. It is in particular not only those of whom a parent or grandparent belonged to the Jewish religion who are non-Aryan .... Thus, the Law by no means excludes the possibility of non-Aryan descent, even if none of the parents or grandparents belonged to the Jewish religion, in the event that non-Aryan descent can be established by other means.

== Related ordinances ==
- 11 April 1933 – First Ordinance on the Implementation of the Law for the Restoration of the Professional Civil Service
- 25 April 1933 – Law against the Overcrowding of German Schools and Universities
- 6 May 1933 – Third Ordinance on the Implementation of the Law for the Restoration of the Professional Civil Service
- 21 January 1935 – Law on the Retirement and Transfer of Professors as a Result of the Reorganization of the German System of Higher Education

== See also ==
- Aryan certificate, Ahnentafel, Ahnenpass to prove Aryan descent
- Racial policy of Nazi Germany
