= Geltungsjude =

People considered as Jews by the Nuremberg Laws

Geltungsjude was the term for people who were considered Jews by the first supplementary decree to the Nuremberg Laws from 14 November 1935. The term was not used officially, but was coined because the persons were deemed (gelten in German) Jews rather than exactly belonging to any of the categories of the previous Nuremberg Laws. There were three categories of Geltungsjuden: 1. offspring of an intermarriage who belonged to the Jewish community after 1935; 2. offspring of an intermarriage who was married to a Jew after 1935; 3. illegitimate child of a Geltungsjude, born after 1935.

== Definition ==
The definition of these persons in the decree is as follows:

ARTICLE 5 (2) A Jew is also an individual [jüdischer Mischling] who is descended from two full-Jewish grandparents if:

(a) he was a member of the Jewish religious community when this law was issued, or joined the community later;
(b) when the law was issued, he was married to a person who was a Jew, or was subsequently married to a Jew;
(c) he is the issue from a marriage with a Jew, in the sense of Section I, which was contracted after the coming into effect of the Law for the Protection of German Blood and Honor of 15 September 1935;
(d) he is the issue of an extramarital relationship with a Jew, in the sense of Section I, and was born out of wedlock after 31 July 1936.

Each of these is considered a Jew, hence the name Geltungsjude. The term jüdischer Mischling in the first sentence means Jewish half-breed. A person with two Jewish grandparents who satisfied none of the criteria (a) through (d) was not considered a "Geltungsjude" but a Mischling of the First Degree. (See also the article on the Mischling test.)

== Consequences ==
Geltungsjuden were not citizens of the Reich anymore and did not have the right to vote. They were also prohibited to marry a quarter Jew. In the Protectorate, they were routinely deported. They were sometimes deported from the "Old Reich" (Altreich), and only very rarely from Austria.

In contrast, while Mischlinge of the First Degree within the Old Reich were subject to various forms of discrimination, they were at least in principle exempt from deportation. Their status as "provisional citizens" was subject of an intra-regime tug-of-war between maximalists like Heydrich (who wanted them treated like Jews) and minimalists who pleaded against "throwing out the Aryan with the Jewish blood" (such as Wilhelm Stuckart and his assistant Hans Globke).

== See also ==
- Honorary Aryan
- Racial policy of Nazi Germany
