= Defence of India act =

Defence of India act may refer to

- Defence of India Act, 1915, an emergency criminal law enacted in British India in 1915 as measures against the threat of Indian revolutionary nationalism during World War I.
- Defence of India Act, 1939, enacted in British India in September 1939 effectively declaring martial law at the onset of World War II.
- Defence of India act and Defence of India rules, 1962, enacted in independent India during the Sino-Indian war of 1962.
- Defence of India Act, 1971, enacted in independent India in December 1971 at the onset of the 1971 Indo-Pak war.
