= Interracial marriage =

Marriage between individuals of different racial/ethnic backgrounds

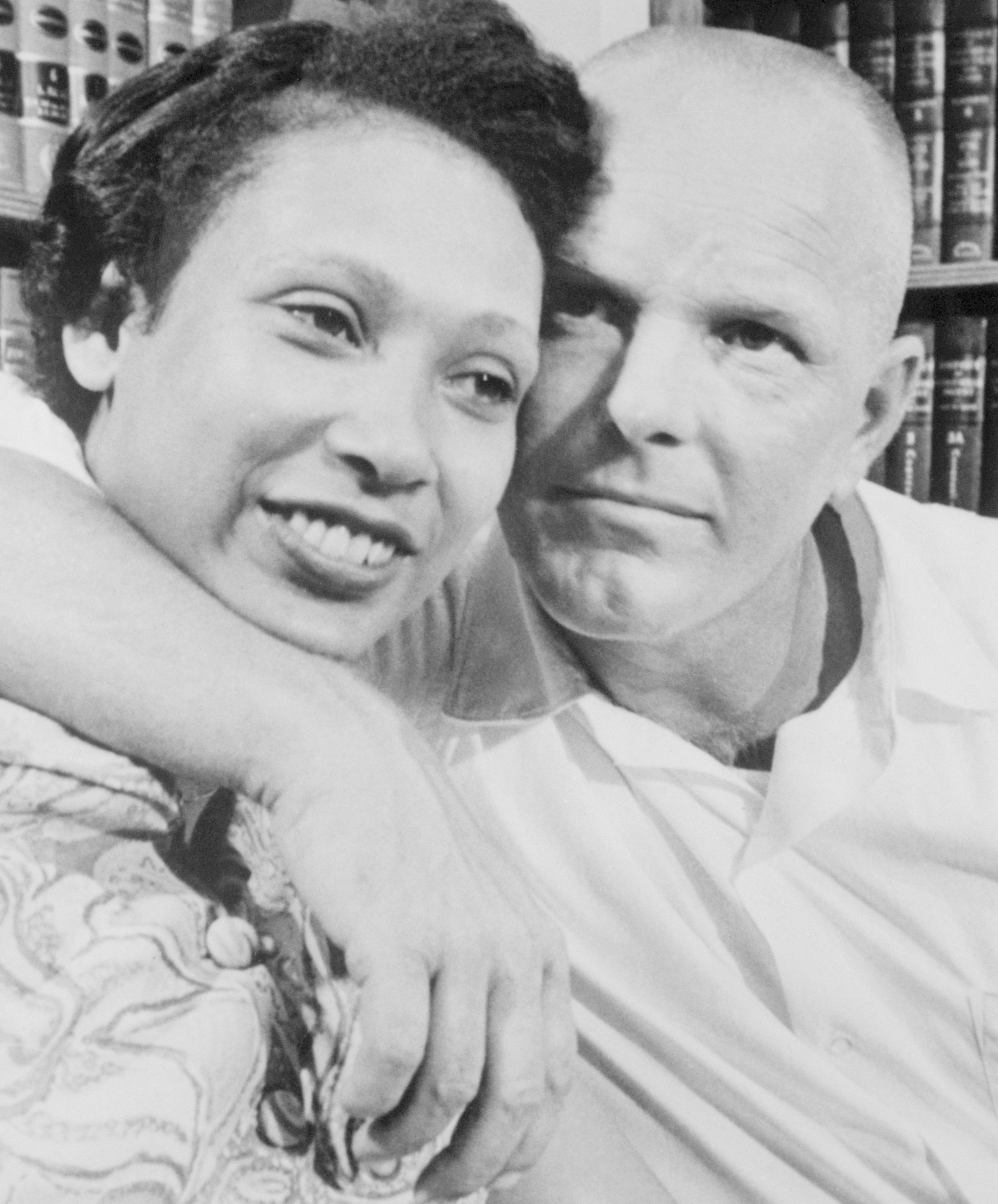
Mildred and Richard Loving (photo: 1967) were an example of a married interracial couple.

Interracial marriage is a marriage involving spouses who belong to different races or racialized ethnicities.

In the past, such marriages were forbidden by law in Nazi Germany, certain U.S. states, and apartheid-era South Africa as miscegenation (Latin: 'mixing types') — a term which first appeared in Miscegenation: The Theory of the Blending of the Races, Applied to the American White Man and Negro, a hoax anti-abolitionist pamphlet published in 1864. By 1960, interracial marriage was outlawed in 31 U.S. states.

== Legality ==
Interracial marriage has been internationally protected under the Universal Declaration of Human Rights which granted the right to marriage "without any limitation due to race, nationality or religion", since it was accepted by the UN in 1948. Since its enactment, it has been accepted by nearly every nation on the globe. Despite this, interracial marriage was not legalized in all U.S. states until Loving v. Virginia in 1967 which legalized interracial marriage in all fifty states. In addition, the UDHR is not legally binding and thus it is not necessarily reflective of global policies on interracial marriage.

A 2013 Gallup poll found that 11 percent of Americans said they disapprove of interracial marriage, compared with 94% who disapproved in 1958. In 1958, actor Sammy Davis Jr., who had faced a backlash for his involvement with a white woman, actress Kim Novak, briefly married a black woman to protect himself from mob violence. The opposition to interracial marriage in the United States prior to its legalization in 1967 was reflected by former president Harry S. Truman in 1963 who, when asked by a reporter if interracial marriage would become widespread in the United States, responded, "I hope not; I don't believe in it. Would you want your daughter to marry a Negro? She won't love someone who isn't her color." African Americans' approval of interracial marriage has consistently been higher than those of white Americans over the decades, and in 2013 black Americans' approval (96%) was now nearly universal, while white Americans' approval was at 84%. In 2021, 94% of U.S. adults approved of interracial marriages. In the past, many jurisdictions have had regulations banning or restricting not just interracial marriage but also interracial sexual relations, including Germany during the Nazi period, South Africa under apartheid, and many states in the United States prior to the 1967 landmark Supreme Court case Loving v. Virginia.

== Complications ==
A 2008 study by Jenifer Bratter and Rosalind King conducted on behalf of the Education Resources Information Center examined whether crossing racial boundaries in the United States increased the risk of divorce. Comparisons across marriage cohorts revealed that, overall, interracial couples have higher rates of divorce, particularly for those that married during the late 1980s. A 2009 study by Yuanting Zhang and Jennifer Van Hook also found that interracial couples were at increased risk of divorce. One consistent finding of this research was that gender is significantly related to divorce risk. Interracial marriages involving a White woman have a higher risk of divorce, as compared with interracial marriages involving Asian or Black women (interracial marriages involving Black women showed a decreased risk of divorce, lower than non-interracial marriages).

According to authors Stella Ting-Toomey and Tenzin Dorjee, the increased risk of divorce observed in couples with a White wife may be related to decreased support from family members and friends. They note that White women were viewed as unqualified by their non-White in-laws to raise and nurture mixed race children, due to their lack of experience in "navigating American culture as a minority". A 2018 study by Jenifer Bratter and Ellen Whitehead found that white women with mixed race children were less likely to receive family support than were non-white women with mixed race children.

In one study, White women married to Black men were more likely to report incidents of racial discrimination in public, such as inferior restaurant service or police profiling, compared to other interracial pairings. Such discriminatory factors may place these marriages at an increased risk of divorce. A study published in 2008 reported a lower risk of divorce for inter-ethnic marriages between Hispanics and non-Hispanic Whites. However, another study, published in 2011, found that these intermarriages were at an increased risk of divorce. Gender was found to be related to the probability of divorce, with marriages involving White women and Hispanic men having the highest risk of divorce.

== Benefits ==
=== Positive interracial encounters ===
A benefit of interracial marriages is that it increases the opportunity for positive interracial encounters. Research conducted by Pettigrew and Tropp (as cited in Latson) has found a reduction in prejudice and discrimination towards members of an out-group (someone from whom one has a different racial identity) when one has positive interracial encounters. Pettigrew and Tropp found intergroup friendships were associated with decreased intergroup prejudice. This can be explained by the "Contact Hypothesis" which is the idea that intergroup contact under appropriate conditions can effectively reduce in-group out-group prejudice. This contact does not have to be direct, but it could also be vicarious. For instance, Wright et al. found Caucasians who report knowing another Caucasian with an inter-race friend had fewer negative attitudes about non-Caucasians regardless of direct level of contact.

Wright et al. created a competition between two groups who thought the groups had been formed based on similarity. After an intergroup hostility had been established, participants observed a member of an in-group member (confederate) complete a task with an out-group person (also a confederate). The participant observed the confederate acting differently depending on the condition she observed. In the positive condition, the confederates hugged and greeted each other as pre-existing friends (positive condition). In the neutral condition, the confederates were polite to each other but not necessarily friendly. In the hostile condition, the confederates acted as if they were pre-existing enemies. Participants who were in the positive condition rated the out-group more positively on both negative characteristics such as "inflexible" and positive characteristics such as "intelligent". They concluded that merely observing a positive in-group member act positively towards an out-group member increases positive feelings towards the out-group

=== Mixed‐race people ===
There are both challenges and potential benefits that come with being multiracial. Some research has previously claimed that mixed‐race individuals are perceived as more attractive than their monoracial peers. However, such claims have been challenged on the grounds that they rely on oversimplified assumptions about genetic distinctiveness and ignore the substantial role that culture and socialization play in shaping beauty ideals.

Critics argue that applying heterosis – the idea that genetic diversity inherently enhances physical traits – to human populations is problematic because traditional racial categories are not biologically discrete. Although earlier studies (e.g., those by Rhodes et al. and Elena Stepanova) reported higher attractiveness ratings for some mixed‐race faces, subsequent analyses have shown that attractiveness is a complex social construct that varies with context, time, and cultural influences rather than being solely determined by genetic factors.

There are additional challenges associated with being multiracial. For example, many multiracial individuals struggle with discerning who they are. A 2012 survey found that one‐fifth of respondents feel pressure to claim just one race, while one‐quarter experience confusion about their racial identity. This complexity can subject multiracial individuals to a different kind of discrimination than that experienced by monoracial people. For instance, Sarah Gaither has found that multiracial individuals often face rejection from multiple racial groups – for example, those with one Black and one White parent may feel they are not "black enough" for predominantly Black groups, nor "white enough" for predominantly White groups.

At the same time, many multiracial people report that the fluidity of their identity – allowing them to navigate between different social groups – can contribute to higher self-esteem, increased social engagement, and enhanced well-being. In some cases, this flexibility has even been linked to improved creative problem-solving skills when individuals are prompted to consider the multiple facets of their identity.

== Americas ==
=== United States ===
U.S. States, by the date of repeal of anti-miscegenation laws: No laws passed Repealed before 1887 Repealed between 1948 and 1967 Overturned on 12 June 1967

The first interracial marriage in the territory that would eventually become the United States took place in 1565 in St. Augustine, Florida: Luisa de Abrego, a free black woman, married Miguel Rodriguez, a Spanish man from Segovia.

The first anti-miscegenation law was passed by the Maryland General Assembly in 1691, criminalizing interracial marriage. A belief in racial purity and white supremacy were among the reasons for such laws, with Abraham Lincoln stating in an 1858 speech, "I am not, nor ever have been in favor of making voters or jurors of negroes, nor of qualifying them to hold office, nor to intermarry with white people. I as much as any man am in favor of the superior position assigned to the white race." By the late 1800s, 38 U.S. states had laws banning interracial marriage. Before the civil rights movement of the 1960s, the overwhelming majority of white evangelical Christians in the Southern United States saw racial segregation in marriage as something divinely instituted from God, and held that legal recognition of interracial couples would violate biblical teaching.

Interracial marriage in the United States has been fully legal in all U.S. states following the decision of the Supreme Court of the United States under Chief Justice Earl Warren in the case Loving v. Virginia, which ruled that race-based restrictions on marriages, such as the anti-miscegenation law in the state of Virginia, violated the Equal Protection Clause (adopted in 1868) of the United States Constitution.

Many states had opted to legalize interracial marriage prior to Loving v. Virginia. Interracial marriages increased from 2% of married couples in 1970 to 7% in 2000 and 8.4% in 2010. The number of interracial marriages as a proportion of new marriages has increased from 11% in 2010 to 19% in 2019.

Mildred and Richard Loving helped end laws prohibiting interracial marriage in the United States in 1967.

According to a Pew Research Center analysis of census data conducted in 2013, 12% of newlyweds married someone of a different race. (This share does not take into account the "interethnic" marriages between Hispanics and non-Hispanics). And, most Americans say they approve of racial or ethnic intermarriage – not just in the abstract, but in their own families. About six-in-ten say it would be fine with them if a family member told them they were going to marry someone from any major race/ethnic groups other than their own.

Some racial groups are more likely to intermarry than others. Of the 3.6 million adults who got married in 2013, 58% of Native Americans, 28% of Asian Americans, 19% of African-Americans and 7% of White Americans have a spouse whose race was different from their own. The overall numbers mask significant gender gaps within some racial groups. Among black Americans, men are much more likely than women to marry someone of a different race. Fully a quarter of black men who got married in 2013 married someone who was not black. Only 12% of black women married outside of their race. For Asians, the gender pattern goes in the opposite direction: Asian women are much more likely than Asian men to marry someone of a different race. Among newlyweds in 2013, 37% of Asian women married someone who was not Asian, while 16% of Asian men married outside of their race. However, Asian women are more likely to marry Asian men than any other men of different ethnic background. Native Americans have the highest interracial marriage rate among all single-race groups. Women are slightly more likely to "marry out" than men in this group: 61% of Native American female newlyweds married outside their race, compared with 54% of Native American male newlyweds.

Although the anti-miscegenation laws have been revoked by the Warren Court in 1967, the social stigma related to black interracial marriages still exists in today's society although to a much lower degree. Research by Tucker and Mitchell-Kerman from 1990 has shown that black Americans intermarry far less than any other non-White group and in 2010, only 17.1% of black Americans married interracially, a rate far lower than the rates for Hispanics and Asians. Black interracial marriages in particular engender problems associated with racist attitudes and perceived relational inappropriateness. There is also a sharp gender imbalance to Black interracial marriages: In 2008, 22% of all black male newlyweds married interracially while only 9% of black female newlyweds married outside their race, making them one of the least likely of any race or gender to marry outside their race and the least likely to marry at all.

From the mid-19th to 20th centuries, many black people and ethnic Mexicans intermarried with each other in the Lower Rio Grande Valley in South Texas (mostly in Cameron County and Hidalgo County). In Cameron County, 38% of black people were interracially married (7 out of 18 families) while in Hidalgo County the number was 72% (18 of 25 families).

The Chinese that migrated were almost entirely of Cantonese origin. Hundreds of thousands of Chinese men in the United States, mostly of Cantonese origin from Taishan migrated to the United States. Anti-miscegenation laws in many states prohibited Chinese men from marrying non-Asian women. After the Emancipation Proclamation, many intermarriages in some states were not recorded and historically, Chinese American men married African American women in high proportions to their total marriage numbers due to few Chinese American women being in the United States. After the Emancipation Proclamation, many Chinese Americans immigrated to the Southern states, particularly Arkansas, to work on plantations. For example, in 1880, the tenth US census of Louisiana alone counted 57% of interracial marriages between these Chinese to be with black and 43% to be with white women. Between 20 and 30 percent of the Chinese who lived in Mississippi married black women before 1940.

It was discovered by historian Henry Louis Gates Jr. in the African American Lives documentary miniseries that NASA astronaut Mae Jemison has a significant (above 10%) genetic East Asian admixture. Gates speculated that the intermarriage or relations between migrant Chinese workers during the 19th century and black, or African-American slaves or ex-slaves may have contributed to her ethnic genetic make-up. In the mid-1850s, 70 to 150 Chinese were living in New York City and 11 of them married Irish women. In August 1906, the New York Times reported that 300 white women (Irish American) were married to Chinese men in New York, with many more cohabited. In 1900, based on Liang research, of the 120,000 men in more than 20 Chinese communities in the United States, he estimated that one out of every twenty Chinese men (Cantonese) was married to white women. In the 1960s census showed 3500 Chinese men married to white women and 2900 Chinese women married to white men. It also showed 300 Chinese men married to Black women and vice versa 100.

The 1960 interracial marriage census showed 51,000 black-white couples. White males and black females being slightly more common (26,000) than black males and white females (25,000) The 1960 census also showed that Interracial marriage involving Asian and Native American was the most common. White women most common intermarriage was with Filipino males (12,000), followed by American Indian males (11,200), followed by Japanese males (3,500) and Chinese males (3,500). For White males, the most was with Japanese females (21,700), American Indian females (17,500), followed by Filipina females (4,500) and Chinese females (2,900).

In Loving v. Virginia (1967), the U.S. Supreme Court ruled unanimously that prohibiting interracial marriage was unconstitutional via the 14th Amendment. The court's landmark decision, which was made on 12 June 1967, has been commemorated and celebrated every year on Loving Day (12 June) in the United States.

=== Canada ===
In Canada, 2011, 4.6% of all civil unions are interracial ones, an 18% increase from 2006 (3.9%), and a 77% increase from 1991 (2.6%). Vancouver reported the highest rate of interracial unions, at 9.6%, and Toronto in second place at 8.2%. Major census metropolitan areas had higher frequencies of mixed unions (6.0%) compared to areas that were not classified as such (1.0%). Younger people were more likely to be in a mixed union; the highest proportion of couples in mixed unions was among persons aged 25 to 34 (7.7%), 35 to 44 (6.8%), 15 to 24 (6.1%), 45 to 54 (4.1%), and 55 and over (2.7%).

The 2006 study found that people born in Canada were more likely to marry someone of another race as opposed to those who immigrated there. Only 12% of first-generation immigrant visible minorities were in a mixed union; this figure was higher for second-generation immigrants (51%) and third- or higher generation immigrants (69%). One theory for this may include that those who immigrate as adults, may have already found a partner before immigrating to Canada.

The 2006 study also concluded that same-sex married couples are 2.5 times more likely than opposite-sex couples to be in an interracial marriage; 9.8% of same-sex marriages are interracial. There were some theories as to why; same-sex marriage in Canada become legal in 2005, whereas opposite sex marriage was always legal, and it also mentions that same-sex couples are more likely to be in common-law marriages, and common-law marriages had a higher frequency of mixed unions.

One study done by Reg Bibby found that 92% of Canadians are accepting of interracial marriages.

=== Latin America ===
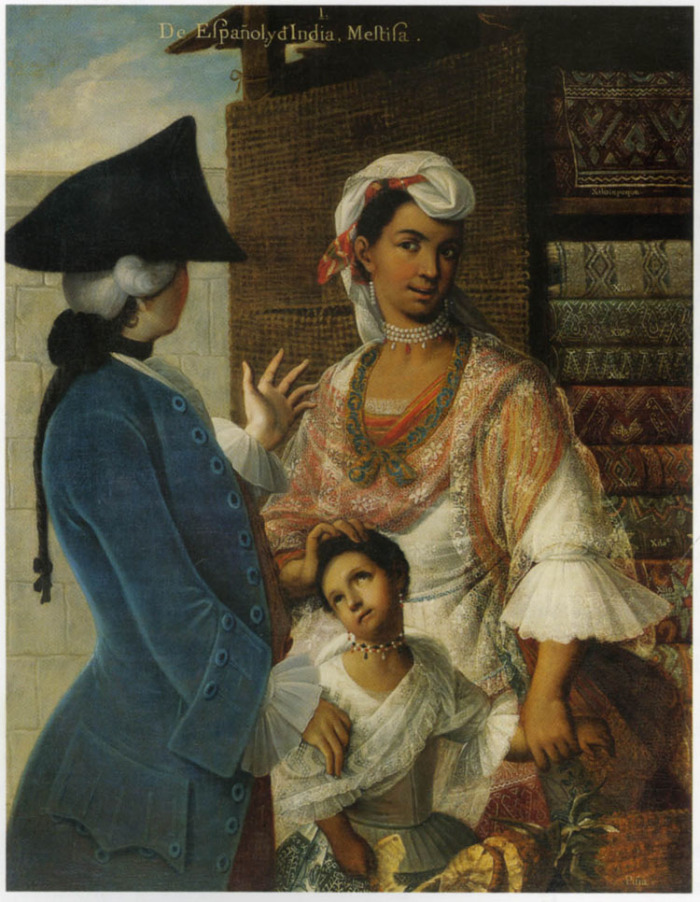
A casta painting of a Spanish man and an Indigenous woman with a Mestizo child

In Latin America, most of the population are descended from Amerindians, Europeans and Africans. They formed the Mestizo and Mulatto populations that populate the countries in Latin America. Intermarriage and inter-relations occurred on a larger scale than most places in the world. In some countries, Asian immigrants have also intermarried among the groups. About 300,000 Cantonese unskilled workers and migrants (mostly male) from the 19th and 20th century and migrants were shipped to Latin America, many had either intermarried or formed sexual relationships with females of different racial origin such as African, Mullato, European, Mestizo etc. Of an estimated 100,000 Chinese people that came to Peru, only 15 were women. In Cuba, the 1872 census recorded only 32 Chinese women as compared to 58,368 Chinese men. Between a total roughly 140,000 Chinese males went to Cuba between 1847 and 1874, with around another 100,000 went to Peru between 1849 and 1874.

Around 20,000 mostly Cantonese and some Hakka unskilled workers migrated to Jamaica, Guyana, Trinidad. Many of them intermarried with Black women and East Indian women. Unlike in Trinidad Tobago and Guyana who were predominantly Cantonese men who intermarried with Black women and Indian women. In Guyana, the Chinese were mostly Cantonese men and who intermarried with the local women. Marriage among different Chinese language groups is rare; it is so rare that the any cases of it can be individually named. While intermarriage between Hakka Chinese and Indians hardly occur.

=== Brazil ===
The miscegenation in Brazil occurred mainly through concubinages involving black or mulatto women and white men of Portuguese origin. The lack of white women in the early colony pushed many white men into relationships with women of color. These relationships were hardly made official in the church, given the rigidity of Portuguese legislation, resulting in concubinages, some temporary, others lasting. The Catholic Church tried to repress concubinage by considering it a crime.

In a survey of people accused of concubinage in the Comarca do Rio das Velhas, in Minas Gerais, between 1727 and 1756, the numbers show that among individuals having concubines, 92% were white men. However, of the concubines 52.1% were African, 35.1% Creole or mestizo, and only 11.8% were white. There was, therefore, a clear predominance of concubinage involving a white man (92%) and a black or mulatto woman (87.2%).

For modern Brazil, research suggests that approximately 30% of all marital unions, including both formal marriages and cohabitation, are interracial. This figure is lower than might be expected given Brazil's large nonwhite population and the ideology of "racial democracy", with 70% of unions occurring within the same racial category. There is no census data for women, but among men:

- 75.3% of white men marry white women, 20,4% brown, 3,6% black, 0,6% yellow, 0,1% indigenous
- 69% of brown men marry brown women, 26,1% white, 3,9% black, 0,9 yellow, 0,1 indigenous
- 65.4% of indigenous marry indigenous women, 16,6% white, 13,9% brown, 3,1% black, 1% yellow
- 44.2% of yellow men marry yellow women, 24,7% brown, 24% white, 3,9% black, 0,1% indigenous
- 39.9% of black men marry black women, 32,1% brown, 26,1% white, 1,4% yellow, 0,1 indigenous

Mixed-race marriages accounted for 8.2% of all marriages in Brazil in 1960, increasing to 30.7% by 2010. However, significant disparities in marriage patterns by race persist, with most interracial marriages occurring between pardos (mixed-race individuals) and whites, particularly between white women and pardo men. According to the 2010 Brazilian Census, endogamy rates remained high among whites (74.5%), pardos (68.5%), and indigenous people (64.6%). Demographers attribute this trend to changes in the country's ethnic composition. Between 2000 and 2022, the proportion of the population identifying as white declined from 53.7% to 43.5%, while the proportion identifying as pardo (brown) increased from 38.5% to 45.3%, making pardos the country's largest self-identified ethnic group.

== Africa and the Middle East ==
=== Middle East and North Africa ===
Interracial marriage was common in the Arab world during the Arab slave trade, which lasted throughout the Middle Ages and early modern period. Most of these enslaved peoples came from places such as sub-Saharan Africa (mainly Zanj) the North Caucasus, Central Asia (mainly Tatars), and Western, Southern and Southeastern Europe (mainly Slavs – Saqaliba, Spain, France, Italy). These were trafficked to the Arab world from Africa via the Trans-Saharan slave trade, the Red Sea slave trade and the Indian Ocean slave trade; from Central Asia via the Bukhara slave trade; and from Europe via the Prague slave trade, the Venetian slave trade, the Balkan slave trade and the Black Sea slave trade. The Barbary pirates from North Africa captured and enslaved 1.25 million slaves from Western Europe and North America via the Barbary slave trade between the 16th and 19th centuries.

From AD 839, Viking Varangian mercenaries who were in the service of the Byzantine Empire, notably Harald Sigurdsson, campaigned in North Africa, Jerusalem and other places in the Middle East during the Byzantine-Arab Wars. They interbred with the local population as spoils of warfare or through eventual settling with many Scandinavian Viking men taking Syrian or Anatolian women as wives. There is archaeological evidence the Vikings had established contact with the city of Baghdad, at the time the center of the Islamic Empire, and connected with the populace there. Regularly plying the Volga trade route with their trade goods (furs, tusks, seal fat, seal boats and notably female slaves; the one period in the history of the slave-trade when females were priced higher than males), the Vikings were active in the Arab slave trade at the time. The vikings supplied European saqaliba slaves to slavery in the Abbasid Caliphate via the Khazar slave trade and the Volga Bulgarian slave trade. These slaves, most often Europeans who were captured from the coasts of Europe or during war periods, and sold to Arabic traders to slavery in al-Andalus and the Emirate of Sicily.

Foreign non-Muslim harem slave concubines often became the wives of their enslavers. Intermarriage was accepted in Arab society, though only if the husband was Muslim. It was a fairly common theme in medieval Arabic literature and Persian literature. For example, the Persian poet Nizami, who married his Central Asian Kipchak slave girl, wrote The Seven Beauties (1196). Its frame story involves a Persian prince marrying seven foreign princesses, who are Byzantine, Chinese, Indian, Khwarezmian, Maghrebian, Slavic and Tartar. Hadith Bayad wa Riyad, a 12th-century Arabic tale from al-Andalus, was a love story involving an Iberian girl and a Damascene man. The Arabian Nights tale of "The Ebony Horse" involves the Prince of Persia, Qamar al-Aqmar, rescuing his lover, the Princess of Sana'a, from the Byzantine Emperor who also wishes to marry her.

At times, some marriages would have a major impact on the politics of the region. The most notable example was the marriage of As-Salih Ayyub, the Ayyubid sultan of the Egypt and Syria, to Shajar al-Durr, a slave of Turkic origin from Central Asia. Following her husband's death, she became the Sultana of Egypt and the first Mamluk ruler. Her reign marked the end of the Ayyubid dynasty and the beginning of the Mamluk era, when a series of former Mamluk slaves would rule over Egypt and occasionally other neighbouring regions.

Some Algerian women have reportedly entered into customary (nikah 'urfi) marriages with non-Muslim Chinese and Thai men living in Algeria. Some Algerian women have faced difficulties getting their marriages recognized by the Algerian government, which requires documented proof of the husband's conversion to Islam before admitting the otherwise unlawful marriage. One reported case involved an Algerian woman who had three children with a Chinese man whose conversion the authorities questioned. Algeria has a large number of spinsters and the Algerian government demands documented declared proof of conversion to Islam before officially recognizing the unregistered customary marriages which are rampant between Chinese men and Algerian women which produced a generation of Chinese fathered babies with Algerian mothers.

Algerian women are reportedly attracted to the large financial assets Chinese men in Algeria own and because they are afraid of becoming spinsters while the Chinese men get to circumvent the one child policy since one Algerian woman gave birth to three Chinese fathered children. Questions have been raised by Algerian journalists over the lack of commitment to Islam by the Chinese husbands who converted for the marriages.

== Asia ==
=== Korea ===
There were 15,341 international marriages between Koreans and non-Koreans in 2020. Since 2005, the number of international marriages in Korea has been on the decline. About 7% of couples who married in 2020 were international couples.

Since the 1960s, the migration of young women from rural areas towards urban centers for better economic opportunities, leaving an imbalance in rural populations. As a result, young men remaining in their hometown to look after their farm and keep the agriculture industry going. About one third of South Korean men in rural areas married women from abroad, according to Korea National Statistics Office data published in 2006. Marriages between South Korean men and foreign women are often arranged by marriage brokers or international religious groups.

Interracial marriage in Korea dates back to at least the Three Kingdoms period. Records about the period, in particular the section in the Samguk Yusa about the Gaya kingdom (it was absorbed by the kingdom of Silla later), indicate that in 48 AD, King Kim Suro of Gaya (the progenitor of the Gimhae Kim clan) took a princess (Heo Hwang-ok) from the Ayuta nation as his bride and queen. Ayuta is the Korean name for the city of Ayodhya in India. Two major Korean clans today claim descent from this union.

Somewhat later, during the arrival of Muslims in Korea in the Middle Ages, a number of Arab, Persian and Turkic navigators and traders settled in Korea. They took local Korean wives and established several Muslim villages. Some assimilation into Buddhism and Shamanism eventually took place, owing to Korea's geographical isolation from the Muslim world. At least two or three major Korean clans today claim descent from Muslim families.

=== Southeast Asia ===
Interracial marriage in Southeast Asia dates back to the spread of Indian culture, including Hinduism and Buddhism, to the region. From the 1st century onwards, mostly male traders and merchants from the Indian subcontinent frequently intermarried with the local female populations in Cambodia, Burma, Champa, central Thailand, the Malay Peninsula, the Philippines, and Indonesia. Many Indianized kingdoms rose in Southeast Asia during the Middle Ages.

From the 9th century onwards, some male Arab traders from the Middle East settled in Maritime Southeast Asia and married local Malay, Indonesian and Filipina female populations, which contributed to the spread of Islam in Southeast Asia. From the 14th to the 17th centuries, many Chinese, Indian and Arab traders settled within the kingdoms of Maritime Southeast Asia and married within local female populations. This tradition continued among Spain and Portuguese traders who also married within local populations. In the 16th and 17th centuries, thousands of Japanese people travelled to Southeast Asia and married with local women there.

==== Vietnam ====
A Portuguese- and Malay-speaking Vietnamese woman who lived in Macao for an extensive period of time was the person who interpreted for the first diplomatic meeting between Cochinchina and a Dutch delegation. She served as an interpreter for three decades in the Cochinchina court with an old woman who had been married to three husbands, one Vietnamese and two Portuguese. The cosmopolitan exchange was facilitated by the marriage of Vietnamese women to Portuguese merchants. Those Vietnamese woman were married to Portuguese men and lived in Macao which was how they became fluent in Malay and Portuguese.

Foreigners noted that in southeast Asian countries, foreigners would be offered already married local women for sex. William Dampier wrote, "The offering of Women is a Custom used by several nations in the East-Indies, as at Pegu, Siam, Cochinchina, and Cambodia... It is accounted a piece of Policy to do it; for the chief Factors and Captains of Ships have the great men's Daughters offered them, the Mandarins or Noblemen at Tunquin..." Dampier's full account said, "They are so free of their women, that they would bring them aboard and offer them to us; and many of our men hired them for a small matter. This is a custom used by several nations in the East Indies, as at Pegu, Siam, Cochin-China, and Cambodia, as I have been told. It is used at Tunquin also to my knowledge; for I did afterwards make a voyage thither, and most of our men had women on board all the time of our abode there. In Africa, also, on the coast of Guinea, our merchants, factors, and seamen that reside there, have their black misses. It is accounted a piece of policy to do it; for the chief factors and captains of ships have the great men's daughters offered them, the mandarins' or noblemen's at Tunquin, and even the King's wives in Guinea; and by this sort of alliance the country people are engaged to a greater friendship; and if there should arise any difference about trade, or any thing else, which might provoke the native to seek some treacherous revenge, to which all these heathen nations are very prone, then these Dalilahs would certainly declare it to their white friends, and so hinder their countrymen's design."

Alexander Hamilton said, "The Tonquiners used to be very desirous of having a brood of Europeans in their country, for which reason the greatest nobles thought it no shame or disgrace to marry their daughters to English and Dutch seamen, for the time they were to stay in Tonquin, and often presented their sons-in-law pretty handsomely at their departure, especially if they left their wives with child; but adultery was dangerous to the husband, for they are well versed in the art of poisoning."

==== Burma ====
Burmese Muslims are the descendants of Indian Muslims, Arabs, Persians, Turks, Pathans, Chinese Muslims, and Malays who settled and intermarried with the local Burmese population and other Burmese ethnic groups such as the Shan, Karen, and Mon.

During British Indian rule, millions of Indians, mostly Muslim, migrated there. The small population of mixed descendants of Indian men and local Burmese women are called "Zerbadees", often in a pejorative sense implying mixed race. The Rohingya claim to have descended from Bengalis who intermarried with the local women, but this remains a hotly contested issue. The political situation surrounding the actual history of the Rohingya, the lack of evidence, and the counter-claims, mean that proper ancestry cannot be established. The Panthays, a group of Chinese Muslims descended from West Asians and Central Asians, migrated from China and also intermarried with local Burmese females.

Burma has an estimated 52,000 Anglo-Burmese people, descended from British and Burmese people.

==== Malaysia and Singapore ====
In Malaysia and Singapore, the majority of inter-ethnic marriages are between Chinese and Indians. The offspring of such marriages are informally known as "Chindian". The Malaysian and Singaporean governments, however, only classify them by their father's ethnicity. As the majority of these marriages involve an Indian groom and Chinese bride, the majority of Chindians in Malaysia are usually classified as "Indian" by the Malaysian government. As for the Malays, who are predominantly Muslim, legal restrictions in Malaysia make it less common for them to intermarry with either the Indians, who are predominantly Hindu, or the Chinese, who are predominantly Buddhist and Taoist.

It is common for Arabs in Singapore and Malaysia to take local Malay wives, due to a common Islamic faith. The Chitty people, in Singapore and the Malacca state of Malaysia, are a Tamil people with considerable Malay descent, which was due to thousands of the first Tamil settlers taking local wives, since they did not bring along any of their own women with them. According to government statistics, the population of Singapore as of September 2007 was 4.68 million, of whom multiracial people, including Chindians and Eurasians, formed 2.4%. In 2007, 16.4% of all marriages in Singapore were inter-ethnic. The Peranakans are descendants of Chinese merchants who settled down in Malaysia and Singapore during the colonial era and married Malay women. There is also a significant minority population of Eurasians who are descended from Europeans – Singapore and Malaysia being former British colonies – and local women.

==== Indonesia ====
Interracial Marriage has been a common occurrence throughout the history of Indonesia, the spread of Buddhism and Hinduism in Indonesia were marked with Indian merchants and Traders who settled into the archipelago and intermarried with the local women, a West Javan epigraphy dating towards the 9th century had mentioned various people of varying ethnicity that had settled in the archipelago. In addition to the people of the Indian subcontinent, the epigraphy had also mentioned people of Champa and Khmer settling in the part of the Island, intermarrying with the local people. The same goes with The spread of Islam within the region as it was also marked with intermarriage between the Arab and Muslim Indian traders and Merchants who settled in the archipelago. Continuing the trend seen in Malaysia and Singapore, Arabs within the archipelago also tend to take local female populace as wives as well, taking advantage of the shared faith of Islam.

The first wave of Chinese settlers who immigrated to the Indonesian archipelago during the 14th century also tended to be young single men who would also often take local women as their wives, creating a local Peranakan population within the region, In Java, ethnic Chinese who married local Javanese women and converted to Islam created a distinct Chinese Muslim Peranakan community in Java. The Chinese rarely had to convert to Islam to marry Javanese abangan women but a significant number of their offspring did, and Batavian Muslims absorbed the Chinese Muslim community which was descended from converts. Adoption of Islam back then was a marker of peranakan status which it no longer means. Some Chinese have also intermarried with the local royalties in the Island, for example, The Semaran Adipati and the Jayaningrat noble families were of mixed Chinese origin.

Prior to the arrival and the formal colonization of the East Indies by the Dutch in the 19th century, the islands of modern day Indonesia had already been in frequent contact with European traders. especially the Portuguese. Portuguese maritime traders were present as early as the 16th century. its trading posts, primarily those within the Spice islands are usually populated with Eurasians, primarily of mixed Portuguese-Native Indonesian ancestry. The trend of Europeans intermixing with the local Indonesians continued further during the Dutch colonial era, as the majority of the European settlers the VOC had brought into the colony in the 18th and early 19th centuries were men without wives, and intermarriage occurred with the local inhabitants. These Europeans varies on their ethnicity. In addition to the Dutch and the Portuguese, other European colonial settlers who arrived in the archipelago includes Germans, French, Danes, Flemish, Wallons, English, Scots, Poles, Swedes and Italians among many others.

In addition to the Indo-Europeans, there is also the Mardijker people, the Mardijkers are a people of varying ethnic origins who were brought as slaves to the colony by the VOC from various Portuguese controlled territories in Africa, India and the Malay Peninsula, following their conversion to Protestanism, they were allowed to settle in Batavia, where many of them also took the local female populace as brides. The Mardijkers are culturally Portuguese. Albeit only a minority of them were descendants of actual Portuguese with the rest being descendants of Portuguese speaking Natives of varying ethnic origins. Despite their non European origin, a great portion of the Mardijker community assimilated into the greater Indo-European community during the Colonial rule in Indonesia.

==== Philippines ====
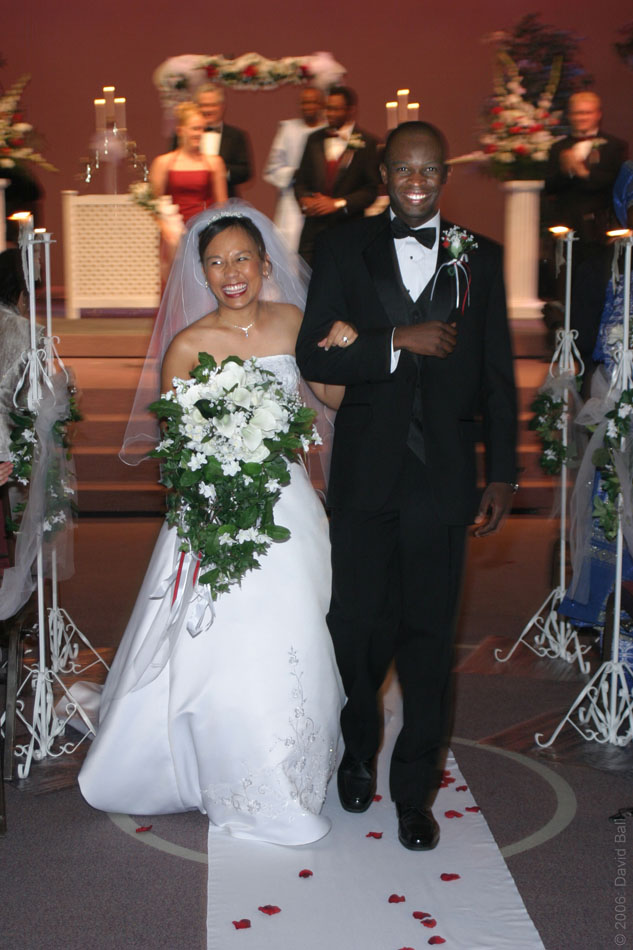
A Filipina bride and Nigerian groom walk down the aisle.

Centuries of migration, diaspora, assimilation, and cultural diversity have made most Filipinos open-minded in embracing interracial marriage and multiculturalism, especially after three centuries of Spanish colonization. Following independence in 1946, the Philippines has seen both small and large-scale immigration into the country, mostly involving Chinese, Americans, Europeans, Japanese, and South Asians. More recent migrations into the country by Koreans, Brazilians, and other Southeast Asians have contributed to the enrichment of the country's ethnic landscape.

Thousands of interracial marriages between Americans and Filipinos have taken place since the United States took possession of the Philippines after the Philippine–American War. Due to the strategic location of the Philippines, as many as 21 bases and 100,000 military personnel were stationed there since the United States first colonized the islands in 1898. These bases were decommissioned in 1992 after the end of the Cold War, but left behind thousands of Amerasian children. The Pearl S. Buck International Foundation estimates there are 52,000 Amerasians scattered throughout the Philippines.

In the United States intermarriage among Filipinos with other races is common. They have the largest number of interracial marriages among Asian immigrant groups, as documented in California. It is also noted that 21.8% of Filipino Americans are of mixed blood, second among Asian Americans, and is the fastest growing.

Interracial marriages particularly among Southeast Asians are continually increasing. At present, there is an increasing number of Southeast Asian intermarriages, particularly between Filipinos and Malaysians. Such marriages have created an impact on language, religion and culture. Dumanig argues that Filipino-Malaysian couples no longer prefer their own ethnic languages as the medium of communication at home. The use of English with some switching in Bahasa Malaysia, Chinese, and Filipino is commonly used.

Philippine nationality law is currently based upon the principles of jus sanguinis and therefore descent from a parent who is a citizen/national of the Republic of the Philippines is the primary method of acquiring Philippine citizenship. Birth in the Philippines to foreign parents does not in itself confer Philippine citizenship, although RA9139, the Administrative Naturalization Law of 2000, does provide a path for administrative naturalization of certain aliens born on Philippine soil (Jus soli). Together, some of these recent immigrants have intermarried with the indigenous Filipinos, as well as with the previous immigrant groups, giving rise to Filipinos of mixed racial or ethnic origins also known as mestizos.

=== South Asia ===
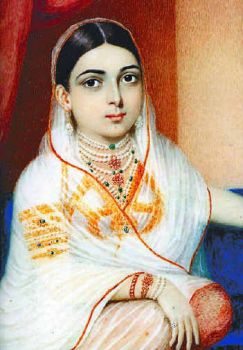
An oil painting of Khair-un-Nissa by George Chinnery. c. 1805. She was an Indian Hyderabadi noblewoman who married British Lieutenant Colonel James Achilles Kirkpatrick.

The Indian subcontinent has a long history of inter-ethnic marriage dating back to ancient India. Various groups of people have been intermarrying for millennia in the Indian subcontinent, including speakers of Dravidian, Indo-Aryan, Iranian, Austroasiatic, and Tibeto-Burman languages. This was particularly common in the northwestern and northeastern parts of the subcontinent where invaders of Central Asian origin often invaded throughout history.

Many Indian traders, merchants, and missionaries travelled to Southeast Asia (where Indianized kingdoms were established) and often took local wives from the region. The Romani people ("Gypsies") who have origins in the Indian subcontinent travelled westwards and also took local wives in Central Asia, the Middle East, and Europe. Genetic studies show that the majority of Romani males carry large frequencies of particular Y chromosomes (inherited paternally) that otherwise exist only in populations from South Asia, in addition to nearly a third of Romani females carrying particular mitochondrial DNA (inherited maternally) that is rare outside South Asia. Around 800, a ship carrying Persian Jews crashed in India. They settled in different parts of India and befriended and traded with the local Indian population. Intermarriage occurred, and to this day the Indian Jews physically resemble their surrounding Indian populations due to intermarriage.

There is also a case of Indian a princess marrying a king abroad. The Korean text Samguk Yusa about the Gaya kingdom (it was absorbed by the kingdom of Silla later), indicate that in 48 AD, King Kim Suro of Gaya (the progenitor of the Gimhae Kim clan) took Princess Heo from "Ayuta", as his bride and queen. According to the Samguk Yusa, the princess' parents had a dream sent by a god who told them about a king from a faraway land. That was King Kim Suro of the Gaya kingdom, in what is now the southeastern tip of South Korea.

In Goa, during the late 16th and 17th centuries, there was a community of Japanese slaves and traders, who were either Japanese Christians fleeing anti-Christian sentiments in Japan, or Japanese slaves brought or captured by Portuguese traders and their South Asian lascar crewmembers from Japan. In both cases, they often intermarried with the local population in Goa. One offspring of such an intermarriage was Maria Guyomar de Pinha, born in Thailand to a Portuguese-speaking Japanese-Bengali father from Goa and a Japanese mother. In turn, she married the Greek adventurer Constantine Phaulkon.

Inter-ethnic marriages between European men and Indian women occurred to a degree during the East India Company rule. The most famous intermarriage was between the Anglo-Indian resident James Achilles Kirkpatrick (who converted to Islam) and the Hyderabadi noblewoman, whose family claimed descent from the Islamic prophet Muhammad, Khair-un-Nissa. During the British East India Company's rule in India in the late 18th century to early 19th century, it was acceptable for British officers and some soldiers, to marry local Indian wives but declined after the Indian rebellion of 1857 due to Anti-miscegenation laws were passed. By the mid-19th century, there were around 40,000 EICrs but less than 2,000 British officials present in India. There are 150,000 in the Anglo-Indian community today, mostly living in Kolkata and Chennai, which grew in numbers due to marriage within and amongst each other. The 65,000 Burgher community of Sri Lanka was initially formed by the intermarriages of Dutch and Portuguese men with local Sinhalese and Tamil women.

In Assam, local Indian women married several waves of Chinese migrants during British colonial times, to the point where it became hard to physically differentiate Chinese in Assam from locals during the time of their internment during the 1962 war. The majority of these Chinese in Assam were married to Indian women, and some of these Indian women were deported to China with their husbands. In the 19th century, when the British Straits Settlement shipped Chinese convicts to be jailed in India, the Chinese men then settled in the Nilgiri mountains near Naduvattam after their release and married Tamil Paraiyan women, having mixed Chinese-Tamil children with them. They were documented by Edgar Thurston. Paraiyan is also anglicized as "pariah".

Edgar Thurston described the colony of the Chinese men with their Tamil pariah wives and children: "Halting in the course of a recent anthropological expedition on the western side of the Nilgiri plateau, in the midst of the Government Cinchona plantations, I came across a small settlement of Chinese, who have squatted for some years on the slopes of the hills between Naduvatam and Gudalur, and developed, as the result of 'marriage' with Tamil pariah women, into a colony, earning an honest livelihood by growing vegetables, cultivating coffee on a small scale, and adding to their income from these sources by the economic products of the cow. An ambassador was sent to this miniature Chinese Court with a suggestion that the men should, in return for monies, present themselves before me with a view to their measurements being recorded. The reply which came back was in its way racially characteristic as between Hindus and Chinese. In the case of the former, permission to make use of their bodies for the purposes of research depends essentially on a pecuniary transaction, on a scale varying from two to eight annas. The Chinese, on the other hand, though poor, sent a courteous message to the effect that they did not require payment in money, but would be perfectly happy if I would give them, as a memento, copies of their photographs." Thurston further describe a specific family: "The father was a typical Chinaman, whose only grievance was that, in the process of conversion to Christianity, he had been obliged to 'cut him tail off.' The mother was a typical Tamil Pariah of dusky hue. The colour of the children was more closely allied to the yellowish tint of the father than to the dark tint of the mother; and the semimongol parentage was betrayed in the slant eyes, flat nose, and (in one case) conspicuously prominent cheek-bones." Thurston's description of the Chinese-Tamil families were cited by others, one mentioned "an instance mating between a Chinese male with a Tamil Pariah female". A 1959 journal article described attempts made to find out what happened to the colony of mixed Chinese and Tamils.

An increasing number of non-Tibetan Muslim men are marrying Ladakhi Tibetan Buddhist women in Ladakh.

The Balti people of Baltistan in Pakistan and Kargil in India are descendants of Tibetan Buddhists who converted to the Noorbakshia sect of Islam. With the passage of time a large number converted to Shia Islam, and a few converted to Sunni Islam. Their Balti language is highly archaic and conservative and closer to Classical Tibetan than other Tibetan languages. The Balti are speakers of a conservative Tibetan dialect in northern Pakistan, Baltistant. Most other Tibetan dialects lost Classical Tibetan consonant clusters that are preserved in Balti. However DNA testing revealed that while Tibetan mtDNA makes up te majority of the Balti's female ancestry, the Balti paternal ancestry has foreign Near Eastern Y haplogroups of non-Tibetan origin.

== Europe ==
=== France ===
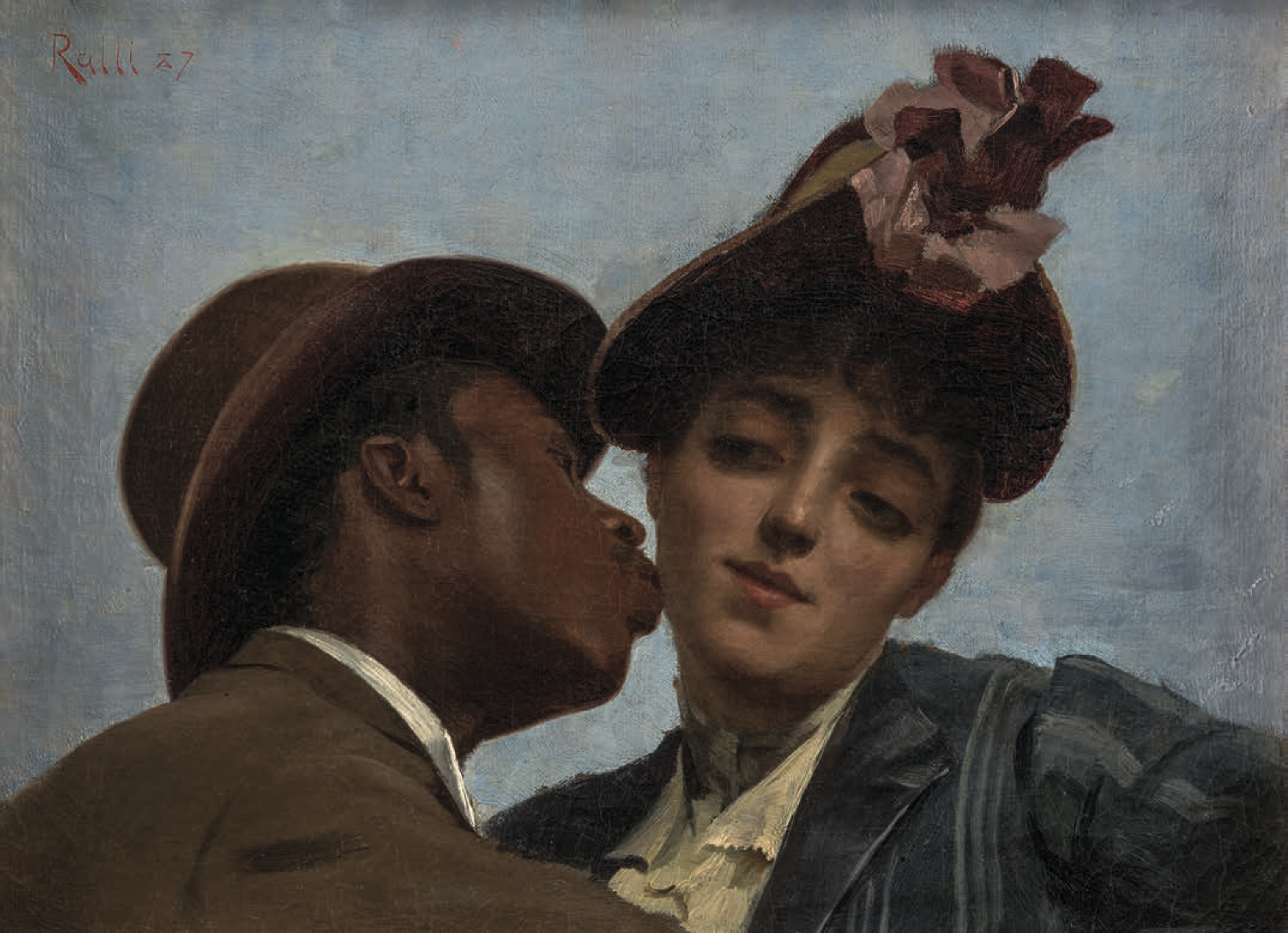
The Kiss, 1887, by Greek-French painter Théodore Jacques Ralli depicts a French interracial couple kissing.

According to official records in 1918 of the Vietnamese men and French women marriages, 250 had married officially and 1363 couples were living together without French parental consent and without the approval of French authorities.

During World War I, there were many soldiers from British India from 1914 to 1915, a large number of soldiers from French Africa, and 20,000 labourers from South Africa, who served in France. There were hundreds of interracial relationships between French women and these foreign soldiers, mainly African and Indian. British and French authorities allowed foreign Muslim soldiers to intermarry with local French females on the basis of Islamic law, which allows marriage between Muslim men and Christian women. On the other hand, Hindu soldiers in France were restricted from intermarriage on the basis of the Indian caste system.

According to some historical research, French are less likely to display a conflictive look on interracial marriage compared to other nations. One study suggests that a look into their film history is a good indication of this. They display less conflict around the issue of interracial marriage in many of their culturally significant films. However, it is unknown if this is truly evidence of less social stigma around the issue or rather a way to ignore the stigma around the issue altogether.

Today in France, the number of mixed marriages increases with each generation. According to an INSEE study, in 2019–2020, while 27% of immigrants are in a couple with a spouse who has no direct migratory ancestry, this figure rises to 66% for 2nd-generation descendants. In the 3rd generation, nine out of ten immigrant grandchildren under 60 have only one or two immigrant grandparents. There is therefore a high rate of integration in France.

=== Germany ===
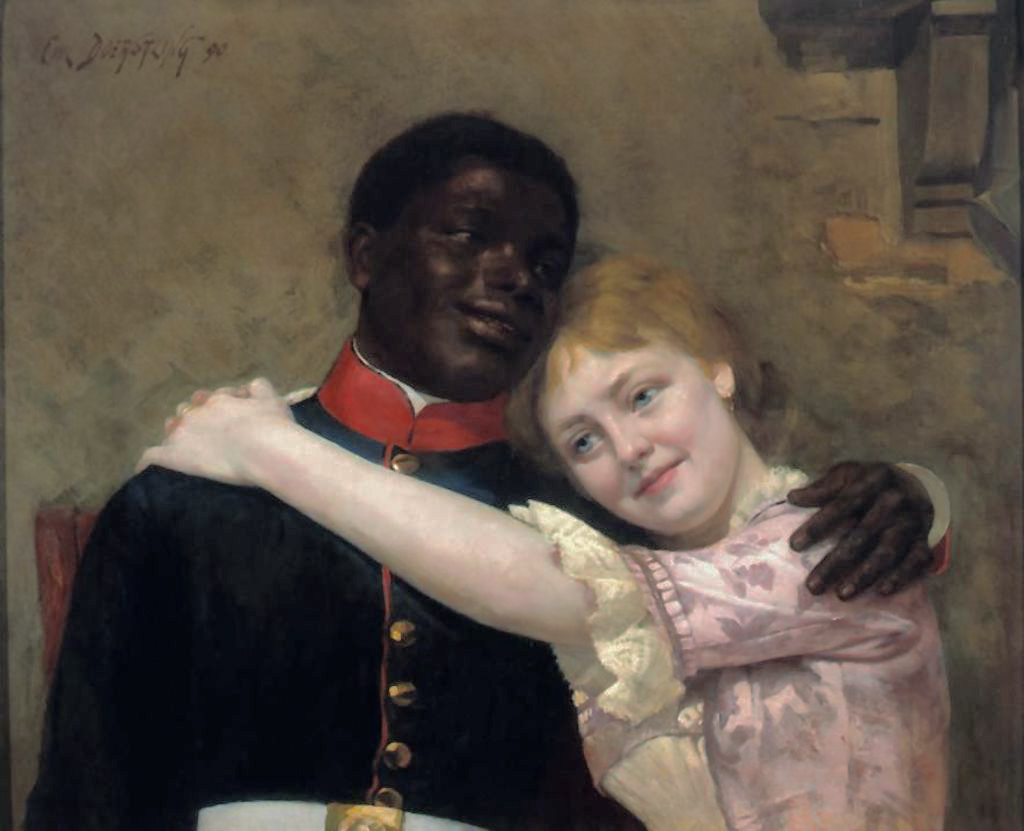
1890 painting titled "Preußisches Liebesglück" ("Prussian Happiness in Love") by Emil Doerstling

The administrations of the German colonies in Africa and the South Seas enacted bans on marriages with non-European natives in the early 20th century. When the issue was debated in the Reichstag in 1912, this ban was rejected by a majority and an inclusive marriage law was demanded (see German interracial marriage debate (1912)). However, it never came to pass because of the beginning of World War I a few years later.

The race laws of the United States, the global leader in codified racism, fascinated the Nazis. The National Socialist Handbook for Law and Legislation of 1934–1935, edited by the Nazi Party lawyer Hans Frank, contains a pivotal essay by Herbert Kier on the recommendations for race legislation which devoted a quarter of its pages to U.S. legislation, including its anti-miscegenation laws and racial segregation. Nazi Germany introduced the Nuremberg Laws in 1935, among which was the Law for the Protection of German Blood and German Honour that banned marital as well as extramarital relations between Germans (incl. people deemed to be racially similar, colloquially Aryans) and Jews. Although Slavs could be in theory included as Aryans, (Note: The term 'Arier', i.e. 'Aryan', was never used in important legal documents. Instead, one usually encounters the term 'artverwandtes Blut', i.e. roughly 'kindred blood' or 'blood of related stock', which includes, in theory, all native Europeans except for Jews and Gypsies.) Nazi Germany's legal practice consisted in strict segregation of Germans and most subjugated Slavs and harsh punishment for miscegenation, as exemplified by the Polish decrees of 1940.

=== Iceland ===
Most Icelanders are descendants of Norwegian settlers and Celts from Ireland and Scotland, brought over as slaves during the age of settlement. Recent DNA analysis suggests that around 66% of the male settler-era population was of Norse ancestry, whereas the female population was 60% Celtic.

=== Italian Peninsula ===
As was the case in other areas occupied, it was acceptable in Islamic marital law for a Muslim male to marry Christian and Jewish females in southern Italy when under Islamic rule – namely, the Emirate of Sicily, and, of least importance, the short-lived Emirate of Bari between the 8th and 11th centuries. In this case, most intermarriages were between Arab and Berber males from North Africa and the local Roman and Italian females. Such intermarriages were particularly common in the Emirate of Sicily, where one writer visiting the place in the 970s expressed shock at how common it was in rural areas. After the Norman conquest of southern Italy, all Muslim citizens (whether foreign, native or mixed) of the Kingdom of Sicily were known as "Moors". After a brief period when the Arab-Norman culture had flourished under the reign of Roger II of Sicily, later the mainlander Italians migrated to Sicily persecuted the Muslims of Sicily and they killed many of them; later the remnants were expelled in 1239 with the persecution of Frederick II, who deported the Muslim survivors in Lucera.

At times, the Italian city-states also played an active role in the Arab slave trade, where Moorish and Italian traders occasionally exchanged slaves. For example, two researchers suggest that Leonardo da Vinci's mother Caterina may have been a slave from the Middle East. (Note: According to Alessandro Vezzosi, Head of the Leonardo Museum in Vinci, there is evidence that Piero owned a Middle Eastern slave called Caterina who gave birth to a boy called Leonardo. That Leonardo had Middle Eastern blood is supported by the reconstruction of a fingerprint.)

=== Maltese archipelago ===
In Malta, Arabs and Italians from neighbouring Sicily and Calabria intermarried with the local inhabitants, who were descended from Phoenicians, Romans and Vandals. The Maltese people are descended from such unions, and the Maltese language is descended from Siculo-Arabic.

=== United Kingdom ===
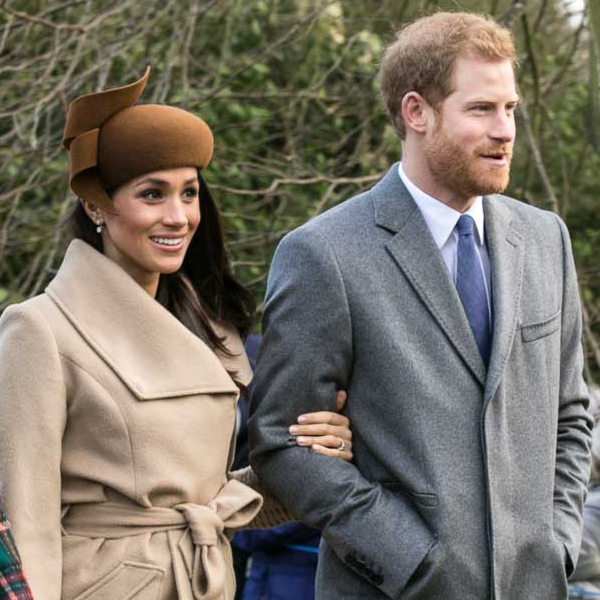
Prince Harry and fiancée Meghan Markle going to church in 2017

Britain has a long history of interethnic marriage among the various European populations that inhabited the island, including the Celtic, Roman, Viking, Anglo-Saxon and Anglo-Norman peoples. In the late 15th century, the Romani people arrived. The arriving Romani nomads intermarried with the British population, forming a distinct community known as the Romanichal. Due to intermarriage, Romnichal today are often indistinguishable from the general White British population.

In addition, a number of British officers who had Indian wives and Anglo-Indian children in British India often brought them over to Britain in the 19th century. From the 1890s onwards, small numbers of Chinese began to set up businesses catering to the Chinese sailors working on Holt's lines and others. Some of these men married working class British women, resulting in a number of British-born Eurasian Chinese being born in Liverpool. The first Chinese immigrants were mainly Cantonese from south China, with some also from Shanghai. The figures of Chinese for 1921 are 2,157 men and 262 women. Many Chinese men married British women while others remained single, possibly supporting a wife and family back home in China. During World War II, another wave of Chinese seamen from Shanghai and of Cantonese origin married British women. Records show that about some 300 of these men had married British women and supported families.

Following the end of World War I, there were significantly more females than males in Britain, and there were increasing numbers of sailors from the Indian subcontinent, the Middle East, and the West Indies. A number of the sailors intermarried and settled down with local British women, which led to tensions and a number of race riots breaking out in Cardiff, London, and Liverpool. By the World War II, hostility towards such unions had increased, though such views were in the minority. In 1932, an Indian National Congress (INC) survey of "all Indians outside India"" estimated that there were 7,128 Indians living in the United Kingdom, which included students, professionals such as doctors and lascars.

Male immigrants and visitors to Britain have occasionally intermarried with British women, particularly during the 20th century. These include South Asian lascars before and after World War I, Arab and Indian immigrants during the interwar period, African American GIs during World War II, Maltese and Cypriot cafe owners in the 1940s to 1950s, West Indian immigrants in the 1950s to 1960s, and a new wave of South Asian immigrants in the 1960s. These relationships were marked by an increase in inter-ethnic tensions, though the actual impact of such unions remains a topic of debate among scholars and historians.

According to the 2001 census of Britain, Black British males were around 50% more likely than black females to marry outside their race. British Chinese women (30%) were twice as likely as their male counterparts (15%) to marry someone from a different ethnic group. In 2001, 2% of all marriages in the United Kingdom were inter-ethnic. In 2011 the census showed that almost one in 10 people in Britain were either married or living with someone from a different ethnic group, with proportions ranging from 85% of mixed-race people to 4% of white people.

In 1948, an international incident was created when the British government took exception to the "difficult problem" of the marriage of Seretse Khama and Ruth Williams, whom he had met while studying law in London. The interracial marriage sparked a furore among both the tribal elders of the Bamangwato and the apartheid government of South Africa. The latter objected to the idea of an interracial couple ruling just across their northern border, and exerted pressure to have Khama removed from his chieftainship. Britain's Labour government, then heavily in debt from World War II, could not afford to lose cheap South African gold and uranium supplies. They also feared South Africa might take direct action against Bechuanaland, Khama's homeland, through economic sanctions or a military incursion. The British government began a parliamentary enquiry into Khama's fitness for the chieftainship. Though the investigation reported that he was eminently fit for the rule of Bechuanaland, "but for his unfortunate marriage", the government ordered the report suppressed. (It would remain so for thirty years.) It exiled Khama and his wife from Bechuanaland in 1951. It was many years before the couple was allowed to live in Africa, and several more years before Khama became president of what is now Botswana. Their son Ian Khama served as the president of that country decades later.

According to the 2011 census, people who were cohabiting were more likely to be in an inter-ethnic relationship, than people who were married or in a civil partnership (12% vs 8%). This was the case for all ethnic groups except Other White, where the proportions were the same (39%). The pattern for inter-ethnic relationships for those married or in a civil partnership and those who were cohabiting was similar to the overall picture of inter-ethnic relationships across the ethnic groups – with the Mixed/Multiple ethnic groups as the most likely and White British the least likely. The largest differences between people who were married and cohabiting were in the Asian ethnic groups. Bangladeshis who were cohabiting were nearly seven times more likely to be in an inter-ethnic relationship than Bangladeshis who were married or in a civil partnership (39% compared with 6%). Indians (56% compared with 10%) and Pakistanis (41% compared with 8%) were around five times more likely. Two thirds (65%) of Other Asians cohabiting were in an inter-ethnic relationship compared with 28% who were married (or in civil partnership). In the Other ethnic groups, nearly three quarters of Arabs (72%) and Any Other ethnic groups (74%) cohabiting were in inter ethnic relationships, compared with almost a third (31%) of Arabs and over a third (37%) of Any Other ethnic group who were married (or in a civil partnership). The proportion of people in inter-ethnic relationships was lower in 2001, compared to 2011. Some 6% of people who were married in 2001 were in an inter-ethnic relationship compared to 10% who were cohabiting.

== See also ==
- List of interracial romance films
- Mixed Race Day – Annual celebration on 27 June in Brazil
- Race of the future – Theoretical composite race which will result from ongoing racial admixture
- Race traitor – Pejorative racial term
- Transnational marriage – Marriage between two people from different countries
