= Ferozepore Airfield =

Ferozepore Airfield
- Five kilometres southwest from Ferozepore in India

Site information
- Type: Military airfield

Location
- Location of Ferozepore Airfield in India
- Coordinates: 30°53′47″N 74°34′55″E
- Area: 926.97 acres (3.7513 km^{2})

Site history
- Built: 1943
- In use: 1943 — 1971
- Fate: Advance Landing Ground status
- Battles/wars: Indo-Pakistani air war of 1965; Indo-Pakistani air war of 1971

Ferozepore Airfield, also known as Jahaz Ground and Fattuwala Airstrip, was an Indian Air Force (IAF) airfield located five kilometres southwest from Ferozepore, Punjab region in India. It was established in 1943 to support the IAF, and saw operational use during the 1965 and 1971 Indo-Pakistani Wars. Today, it is under Advance Landing Ground status.

== History ==
On 12 April 1942, the Defence Coordination Department delegated powers under Defence of India Act, 1939 to the Ferozepore Collector. Afterwards, the collector requisitioned considerable areas of land in several areas near Ferozepore for the establishment of an aerodrome on 18 December. On 2 September 1943, the government acquired 21.12 acres (0.0855 km^{2}) acres to established an approach road and 926.97 acres (3.7513 km^{2}) for the landing ground. On 12 March 1945, the collector classified the acquired land for compensation purposes, though compensation disputes and arbitration continued through 1948. In 1964, during the Lal Bahadur Shastri government, a scheme was introduced to have vacant defence land cultivated to increase food production. Subsequently, Madan Mohan Lal and his brother Tek Chand were appointed as crop managers over a 15-acre portion of the airfield. After the scheme ended, the land was returned to the Indian Army.

At the beginning of the Indo-Pakistani air war of 1965, a radar was activated at Ferozepore Airfield. It was first attacked by the Pakistan Air Force (PAF) on 6 September 1965. On 16 September 1965, a PAF air operations aircraft was sent to observe it, and it was engaged by the 35 Heavy Artillery Regiment. Ferozepore Airfield was last operational during the 1971 conflict with Pakistan. Throughout each conflict, the airfield mainly served to camouflage weaponry. Following the Indo-Pakistani conflicts, it remained as an emergency airfield used by the Indian Air Force, known as Jahaz (Landing) Ground.

In 1997, 15 acres were fraudulently sold to private parties. In 2006, the Army had reportedly removed the private occupants from the land, and the purchasers subsequently filed a civil suit seeking possession in 2008. Halwara AFS made a formal complaint to the Ferozepur administration in 2021, and an investigation was made by the High Court. In 2013, a team from the Airports Authority of India conducted an aerial and ground survey of the airfield, checking the economic and technical feasibility of construction low-cost domestic airports in Ferozepur.

== Present ==
The land was under the watch and ward of local military authorities until May 2025, when the Punjab administration restored the disputed remaining 15-acre airstrip to the Ministry of Defence. As of 2025, Fattuwala Airfield has been retained by the Ministry of Defence as an Advance Landing Ground, with administrative control vested in Halwara Air Force Station.
