= Anti-miscegenation laws =

Legislation prohibiting interracial relationships

Anti-miscegenation laws are laws that enforce racial segregation at the level of marriage and intimate relationships by criminalizing interracial marriage, sometimes also criminalizing sex between members of different races.

In the United States, interracial marriage, cohabitation and sex have been termed miscegenation since the term was coined in 1863. Contemporary usage of the term is infrequent, except in reference to historical laws which banned the practice. Anti-miscegenation laws were first introduced in North America by the governments of several of the Thirteen Colonies from the late seventeenth century onward; subsequently they were introduced by the governments of many U.S. states and U.S. territories and they remained in force in many US states until 1967. In the 1960s, an increasing number of states repealed their anti-miscegenation laws. In 1967, in the landmark case Loving v. Virginia, the remaining anti-miscegenation laws were ruled unconstitutional by the U.S. Supreme Court under Chief Justice Earl Warren.

Anti-miscegenation laws were also enforced in Nazi Germany as a part of the Nuremberg Laws which were passed in 1935; they were also enforced in South Africa as a part of the system of apartheid, which was introduced in 1948.

== United States ==
The first ever anti-miscegenation law was passed by the Maryland General Assembly in 1691, criminalizing interracial marriage. By the late 1800s, 38 U.S. states had anti-miscegenation statutes. By 1924, the ban on interracial marriage was still in force in 29 states. While interracial marriage had been legal in California since 1948, in 1957 actor Sammy Davis Jr. faced backlash for his relationship with a white woman, actress Kim Novak. In 1958, Davis briefly married a black woman, actress and dancer Loray White, to protect himself from mob violence.

In 1958, officers in Virginia entered the home of Richard and Mildred Loving and dragged them out of bed for living together as an interracial couple, on the basis that "any white person intermarry with a colored person"— or vice versa—each party "shall be guilty of a felony" and face prison terms of five years. When former president Harry S. Truman was asked by a reporter in 1963 if interracial marriage would become widespread in the U.S., he responded, "I hope not; I don't believe in it", before adding "Would you want your daughter to marry a Negro? She won't love someone who isn't her color." In 1967 the law banning interracial marriage was ruled unconstitutional (via the 14th Amendment adopted in 1868) by the U.S. Supreme Court in Loving v. Virginia. Many states refused to adapt their laws to this ruling with Alabama in 2000 being the last US state to remove anti-miscegenation language from the state constitution. Even with many states having repealed the laws and with the state laws becoming unenforceable, in the United States in 1980 only 2% of marriages were interracial.

== South Africa ==
Early prohibitions on interracial marriages date back to the rule of the Dutch East India Company when High Commissioner Van Rheede prohibited marriages between European settlers and heelslag or full-blooded slave women (that is, of pure Asian or African origin) in 1685. The ban was never enforced.

In 1905, German South West Africa banned the "Rassenmischehe" (racial mixed marriage). These bans had no legal basis in German citizenship laws (issued in 1870 and 1913) and the "decrees [were] issued by either a colonial governor or the colonial secretary", they were "not laws that had received the approval of the Reichstag". Similar such laws were also adopted in the German colonies of German East Africa (1906) and German Samoa (1912).

In 1927, the Pact coalition government passed a law prohibiting marriages between whites and blacks (though not between whites and "coloured" people). An attempt was made to extend this ban in 1936 to marriages between whites and coloureds when a bill was introduced in parliament, but a commission of inquiry recommended against it.

South Africa's Prohibition of Mixed Marriages Act, passed in 1949 under apartheid, forbade marriages between whites and anyone who was deemed to be non-whites. The Population Registration Act (No. 30) of 1950 provided the basis for separating the population of South Africa into different races. Under the terms of this act, all residents of South Africa were to be classified as either a native "white" South African, a "black" immigrant (these typically originating from Bantu lands across the border to the north), or a "colored" person of visibly mixed race parentage. Indians were included under the category "Asian" in 1959. Also in 1950, the Immorality Act was passed, which criminalized all sexual relations between whites and non-whites. The Immorality Act of 1950 extended an earlier ban on sexual relations between whites and blacks (the Immorality Act [No. 5] of 1927) to a ban on sexual relations between whites and any non-whites. Both Acts were repealed in 1985 as a part of the reforms which were carried out during the tenure of P. W. Botha.

== Australia ==
In the late 19th and early 20th centuries, so-called Half-Caste Acts in the Northern Territory, Western Australia and Queensland regulated marriage between indigenous and non-indigenous adults, often requiring permission from an official to marry. Officials were concerned with controlling relations between indigenous women and Chinese fishermen and pearl divers. From the mid-1930s there was a shift to control who Aboriginal peoples could marry, in order to promote assimilation, until 1961 when the federal Marriage Act removed all restrictions.

== Asia ==
=== China ===
Laws and policies which discouraged miscegenation were passed during the rule of various dynasties, including an 836 CE decree which forbade Chinese people from having relationships with members of other people groups such as Iranians, Africans, Arabs, Indians, Malays, Sumatrans, and so on.

=== India ===
While there are no specific provisions regarding the freedom to marry someone who is a member of a different race in the Constitution of India, Article 21 of the Constitution, which is a Fundamental Right, is widely regarded as to provide that freedom as it comes under "personal liberty", which the Constitution guarantees to protect.

During Company rule in India, the East India Company encouraged marriages between British men and Indian women; Indian women who bore children were given a gift of gold upon the Christian baptism of the child. This contributed to the expansion of the Anglo-Indian community. After the events of the Indian Rebellion of 1857, several anti-miscegenation laws were passed by the British colonial government of India.

=== North Korea ===
After the deterioration of relations between North Korea and the Soviet Union in the 1960s, North Korea began to enact practices such as forcing its male citizens who had married Eastern European women to divorce them.

Additionally, the North Korean government has been accused of performing forced abortions and infanticides on repatriated defectors to "prevent the survival of half-Chinese babies".

== Europe ==
=== Nazi Germany ===
The U.S. was the global leader of countries where codified racism was practiced, and its race laws fascinated the Nazis. The National Socialist Handbook for Law and Legislation of 1934–1935, edited by the lawyer Hans Frank, contains a pivotal essay by Herbert Kier on the recommendations for race legislation which devoted a quarter of its pages to U.S. legislation—from segregation, race based citizenship, immigration regulations, and anti-miscegenation. The Nazis enacted miscegenation statutes which discriminated against Jews, Roma and Sinti ("Gypsies"), and Black people. The Nazis considered the Jews to be a race supposedly bound by close genetic (blood) ties to form a unit which one could neither join nor secede from, rather than a religious group of people. The influence of Jews had been declared to have detrimental impact on Germany, in order to justify the discrimination and persecutions of Jews. To be spared, one had to prove one's Aryan descent, normally by obtaining an Aryan certificate.

==== Jews, Romani and Black people ====
Although Nazi doctrine stressed the importance of physiognomy and genes in determining race, in practice, race was only determined through the religions which were followed by each individual's ancestors. Individuals were considered non-'Aryan' (i.e. Jewish) if at least three of four of their grandparents had been enrolled as members of a Jewish congregation; it did not matter if those grandparents had been born to a Jewish mother or had converted to Judaism. The actual religious beliefs of the individual himself or herself were also immaterial, as was the individual's status under halakhic law.

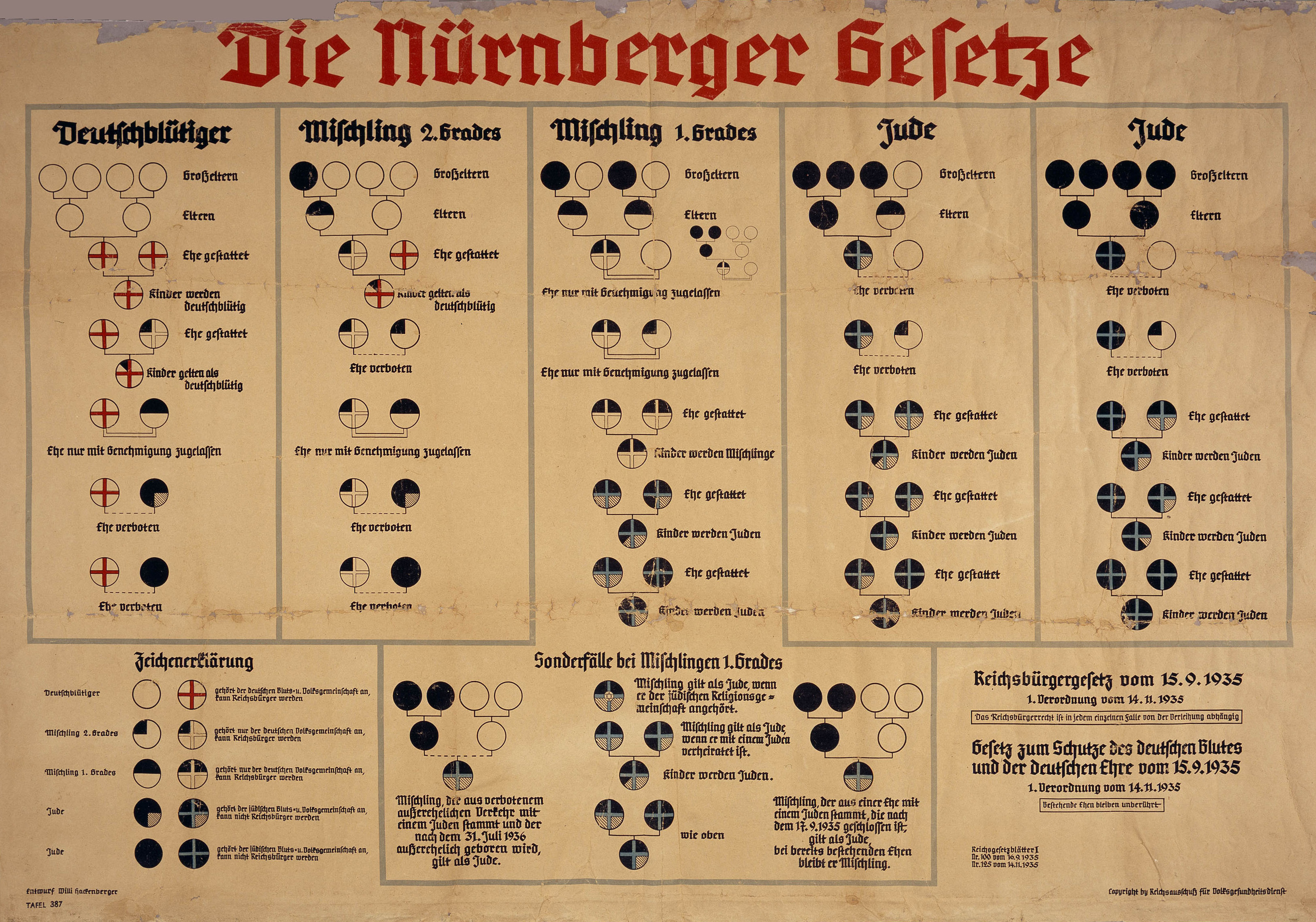
1935 chart shows racial classifications under the Nuremberg Laws and the definitions of a German, a Mischlinge and a Jew.

An anti-miscegenation law was enacted by the Nazi government in September 1935 as a part of the Nuremberg Laws. The Law for the Protection of German Blood and German Honour ('Gesetz zum Schutze des deutschen Blutes und der deutschen Ehre'), enacted on 15 September 1935, forbade sexual relations and marriages between Germans classified as so-called 'Aryans' and Germans classified as Jews. This applied also to marriages concluded in Germany with only one spouse of German citizenship. On 26 November 1935, the law was extended to include, "Gypsies, Negroes or their bastard offspring". Such extramarital intercourse was marked as Rassenschande ("race defilement") and could be punished by imprisonment — later usually followed by the deportation to a concentration camp, often entailing the inmate's death. Germans of African and other non-European descent were classified following their own origin or the origin of their parents. Sinti and Roma ("Gypsies") were mostly categorised following police records, e.g. mentioning them or their forefathers as Gypsies, when having been met by the police as travelling peddlers.

The existing 20,454 (as of 1939) marriages between persons racially regarded as so-called 'Aryans' and non-Aryans — called mixed marriages (German: Mischehe) — would continue. However, the government eased the conditions for the divorce of mixed marriages. In the beginning the Nazi authorities hoped to make the 'Aryan' partner get a divorce from their non-Aryan-classified spouses, by granting easy legal divorce procedures and opportunities for the 'Aryan' spouse to withhold most of the common property after a divorce. Those who stuck to their spouse would suffer discriminations like dismissal from public employment, exclusion from civic society organisations, etc.

Any children — whenever born — within a mixed marriage, as well as children from extramarital mixed relationships born until 31 July 1936, were discriminated against as Mischlinge. However, children later born to mixed parents, not yet married at passing the Nuremberg Laws, were to be discriminated against as Geltungsjuden, regardless if the parents had meanwhile married abroad or remained unmarried. Any children who were enrolled in a Jewish congregation were also subject to discrimination as Geltungsjuden.

According to the Nazi family value attitude, the husband was regarded the head of a family. Thus people living in a mixed marriage were treated differently according to the sex of the 'Aryan' spouse and according to the religious affiliation of the children, their being or not being enrolled with a Jewish congregation. Nazi-termed mixed marriages were often not interfaith marriages, because in many cases the classification of one spouse as non-Aryan was only due to her or his grandparents being enrolled with a Jewish congregation or else classified as non-Aryan. In many cases both spouses had a common faith, either because the parents had already converted or because at marrying one spouse converted to the religion of the second (marital conversion). Traditionally the wife used to be the convert. However, in urban areas and after 1900, actual interfaith marriages occurred more often, with interfaith marriages legally allowed in some states of the German Confederation since 1847, and generally since 1875, when civil marriage became an obligatory prerequisite for any religious marriage ceremony throughout the united Germany.

Most mixed marriages occurred with one spouse being considered as non-Aryan, due to his or her Jewish descent. Many special regulations were developed for such couples. A differentiation of privileged and other mixed marriages emerged on 28 December 1938, when Hermann Göring discretionarily ordered this in a letter to the Reich's Ministry of the Interior. The "Gesetz über die Mietverhältnisse mit Juden" (English: Law on Tenancies with Jews) of 30 April 1939, allowing proprietors to unconditionally cancel tenancy contracts with Germans classified as Jews, thus forcing them to move into houses reserved for them, for the first time enacted Göring's creation. The law defined privileged mixed marriages and exempted them from the act.

The legal definitions decreed that the marriage of a Gentile husband and his wife, being a Jewess or being classified as a Jewess due to her descent, was generally considered to be a privileged mixed marriage, unless they had children who were enrolled in a Jewish congregation. Then the husband was obviously not the dominant part in the family and the wife had to wear the yellow badge and the children as well, who were thus discriminated against as Geltungsjuden. Without children, or with children not enrolled with a Jewish congregation, the Jewish-classified wife was spared from wearing the yellow badge (else compulsory for Germans classified as Jews as of 1 September 1941).

In the opposite case, when the wife was classified as a so-called 'Aryan' and the husband as a Jew, the husband had to wear the yellow badge, if they had no children or children enrolled with a Jewish congregation. In case they had common children not enrolled in a Jewish congregation (irreligionist, Christian etc.) they were discriminated as Mischlinge and their father was spared from wearing the yellow badge.

Since there was no elaborate regulation, the practice of exempting privileged mixed marriages from anti-Semitic invidiousnesses varied amongst Greater Germany's different Reichsgaue. However, all discriminations enacted until 28 December 1938, remained valid without exemptions for privileged mixed marriages. In the Reichsgau Hamburg, for example, Jewish-classified spouses living in privileged mixed marriages received equal food rations like Aryan-classified Germans. In many other Reichsgaue they received shortened rations. In some Reichsgaue in 1942 and 1943, privileged mixed couples, and their minor children whose father was classified as a Jew, were forced to move into houses reserved for Jews only; this effectively made a privileged mixed marriage one where the husband was the one classified as so-called 'Aryan'.

The inconsistent application of privileged mixed marriages led to different compulsions to forced labour in 1940: Sometimes it was ordered for all Jewish-classified spouses, sometimes for Jewish-classified husbands, sometimes exempting Jewish-classified wives taking care of minor children. No document or law indicated the exemption of a mixed marriage from some persecutions and especially of its Jewish-classified spouse. Thus if arrested, non-arrested relatives or friends had to prove their exemption status, hopefully fast enough to rescue the arrested from any deportation.

Systematic deportations of Jewish Germans and Gentile Germans of Jewish descent started on 18 October 1941. German Jews and German Gentiles of Jewish descent living in mixed marriage were in fact mostly spared from deportation. In case a mixed marriage ended by death of the 'Aryan' spouse or divorce, the Jewish-classified spouse residing within Germany was usually deported soon after, unless the couple still had minor children not counting as Geltungsjuden.

In March 1943, an attempt to deport the Berlin-based Jews and Gentiles of Jewish descent living in non-privileged mixed marriages, failed due to public protest by their relatives-in-law of 'Aryan kinship' (see Rosenstrasse protest). Also, the Aryan-classified husbands and Mischling-classified children (starting at the age of 16) from mixed marriages were taken by the Organisation Todt for forced labour, starting in autumn 1944.

A last attempt, undertaken in February/March 1945 ended, because the extermination camps already were liberated. However, 2,600 from all areas of the Reich, not yet captured by the Allies, were deported to Theresienstadt, of whom most survived the last months until their liberation.

With the defeat of Nazi Germany in 1945 the laws banning mixed marriages were lifted again. Marriage dates could be backdated, if so desired, for couples who lived together unmarried during the Nazi era due to the legal restrictions, upon marrying after the war. Even if one spouse was already dead, the marriage could be retroactively recognised, in order to legitimise any children and enable them or the surviving spouse to inherit from their late father or partner, respectively. In the West German Federal Republic of Germany 1,823 couples applied for recognition (until 1963), which was granted in 1,255 cases.

=== France ===
In 1723, 1724 and 1774 several administrative acts forbade interracial marriages, mainly in colonies, although it is not clear if these acts were lawful. On 2 May 1746, the Parlement de Paris validated an interracial marriage.

Under King Louis XVI, the order of the Conseil du Roi of 5 April 1778, signed by Antoine de Sartine, forbade "whites of either sex to contract marriage with blacks, mulattos or other people of color" in the Kingdom, as the number of blacks had increased so much in France, mostly in the capital. Nevertheless, it was an interracial marriage prohibition, not an interracial sex prohibition. Moreover, it was an administrative act, not a law. There was never any racial law about marriage in France, with the exception of French Louisiana. But some restricted rules were applied about heritage and nobility. In any case, nobles needed the King's authorization for their marriage.

On 20 September 1792, all restrictions regarding interracial marriage were repealed by the Revolutionary government. On 8 January 1803, a Napoleonic governmental circular forbade marriages between white males and black women, or black men and white women, although the 1804 Napoleonic Code did not mention anything specific about interracial marriage. In 1806, a French court validated an interracial marriage. In 1818, the highest French court (cour de cassation) validated a marriage contracted in New York between a white man and a colored woman. All administrative prohibitions were canceled by a law in 1833.

=== Italy ===
After the fall of the Western Roman Empire in the late 5th century, the Ostrogoths under the Theodoric the Great established the Ostrogothic Kingdom at Ravenna, ruling Italy as a dominant minority. In order to prevent the Romanization of his people, Theodoric forbade intermarriage between Goths and Romans. Theodoric's effort to separate Goths and Romans was however not successful, as intermarriages and assimilation were common. The Rugii, a Germanic tribe which supported Theodoric while preserving its independence within the Ostrogothic Kingdom, avoided intermarriage with Goths and other tribes in order to maintain administrative control.

After the publication of the Charter of Race in Fascist Italy, laws prohibiting marriage between Italians and non-Europeans were passed in Italy and its colonies. A Grand Council's resolution reiterated the prohibition of marriage between Italians and people belonging to "Hamitic, Semitic, and other non-Aryan races"; it established also a ban on marriage between public servants and foreigners. A list made in summer 1938 classified Negroes, Arabs and Berbers, Mongolians, Indians, Armenians, Turks, Yemenites, Palestinians as non-Aryans.

An analogous legislation was adopted in 1942 in the fascist Republic of San Marino.

=== Pre-Islamic Iberia ===
After the fall of the Western Roman Empire in the late 5th century, the Visigoths established the Visigothic Kingdom in Iberia, ruling the peninsula as a dominant minority. The Visigoths were subjected to their own legal code, and were forbidden from intermarrying with indigenous Iberians. This law was abolished in the end of the 6th century however, and by that time so many intermarriages had occurred that any reality of a biologically-linked Visigothic identity were "visibly crumbling", in the words of Gavin Langmuir. The Visigothic nobles and princes married Hispano-Romans and converted to Nicean Christianity, and the connection between Visigoths, their religion and royal authority became obscure.

=== England ===
To prevent the English and Norman settlers from integrating into Gaelic Ireland, the Parliament passed the Statutes of Kilkenny in 1366. The statutes decreed that intermarriage between the English/Normans and the native Irish was forbidden. Although these acts were intended to cover all of the English/Normans in Ireland they in practice were limited in area to the Pale largely due to lack of resources and control in the areas outside of it to fully implement them. Despite England's attempts at preventing it families of English/Norman origin like the Burkes and FitzGeralds did become fully Gaelicized and were said to have become "More Irish than the Irish themselves" by the new English soldiers and settlers of the Tudor Conquest and Plantations of Ireland.

=== British colonies ===
In 1909, the British Colonial Office published a circular known as the "Concubine Circular", officially denouncing officials who kept native mistresses, accusing them of "lowering" themselves in the eyes of the native population. Some colonial officials such as Hugh Clifford, in his 1898 novel Since the Beginning: A tale of an Eastern Land, attempted to defend their relationships with native women as being purely physical, while their relationship with a white wife was "purer". The 1909 circular was part of a wider British movement to maintain an "imperial race" kept at a distance from the native population. However, these efforts did not amount to a rigorous effort to eradicate such practices due to the large number of officials who engaged in such relationships.

== See also ==
- Amalgamation (history)
- Endogamy
- History of Bob Jones University
- Historical race concepts
- Hypodescent
- Judicial aspects of race in the United States
- Loving Day
- Mixed Race Day
- One drop rule
- Race of the future
- Racial hygiene
- Scientific racism
- Social interpretations of race
