= Loving Day =

Annual celebration on June 12 in the United States

- Type: Secular, unofficial
- Significance: Anniversary of Supreme Court decision Loving v. Virginia
- Date: June 12

Loving Day is an annual celebration held on June 12, the anniversary of the 1967 United States Supreme Court decision Loving v. Virginia that struck down all anti-miscegenation laws remaining in sixteen U.S. states. In the United States, anti-miscegenation laws were U.S. state laws banning mixed-race marriages. The Warren Court ruled unanimously in 1967 that these state laws were unconstitutional. Chief Justice Earl Warren wrote in the court majority opinion that "the freedom to marry, or not marry, a person of another race resides with the individual, and cannot be infringed by the State."

Loving Day is not an official national or state holiday in the United States, despite attempts to make it so. A writer for Time magazine in 2010 claimed that Loving Day was "the biggest multiracial celebration in the United States."

According to the Pew Research Center, "In 2019, 11% of all married U.S. adults had a spouse who was a different race or ethnicity from them, up from 3% in 1967. Among newlyweds in 2019, roughly one-in-five (19%) were intermarried."

== History ==
According to a 2010 article in Time magazine:

The idea for Loving Day came from one person, Ken Tanabe. In 2004, while a student at Parsons the New School for Design, Tanabe created Loving Day as part of his senior thesis. Growing up, he had never heard of the Lovings, and as a person of mixed-race heritage, he wanted that to change. He created a website to educate people about the history of mixed-race marriages and encouraged people to host their own Loving Day gatherings to create an annual tradition for the mixed-race community.

According to the official Loving Day website, the event was recognized by a resolution of the United States House of Representatives in 2007, by a proclamation of the Governor of Virginia in 2015, and by a resolution of the California State Assembly in 2017. In 2024, the website listed 16 privately hosted events to mark the day, 11 in U.S. cities and towns, and five in European cities.

== Notable observances ==
Many organizations sponsor annual parties across the country. To celebrate the holiday, people are encouraged to hold parties in which the case and its modern-day legacy are discussed, in smaller settings such as living rooms, backyards, etc., as well as in larger gatherings.

=== United States ===
- The annual flagship Loving Day Celebration in New York City was featured in the BBC documentary series Our World in 2007, on the 40th anniversary of the Loving decision. Coverage of the annual celebration has also been featured in Time Magazine, on the Voice of America, National Public Radio, The Washington Post, and on PBS NewsHour.
- In 2010. New York Times best-selling author Heidi W. Durrow co-organized a celebration of Loving Day in Los Angeles with Fanshen Cox DiGiovanni, during the annual Mixed Roots Film and Literary Festival.
- Several cities and municipalities have issued proclamations officially recognizing Loving Day as a holiday, including Washington, D.C., and Caroline County, Virginia, where the Lovings hailed from.

=== Other countries ===
Since 2013, Loving Day has been celebrated with an annual symposium at De Balie theater in Amsterdam, organized by the Stichting Loving Day foundation.

== See also ==
- Mixed Race Day
