= German interracial marriage debate (1912) =

Parliamentary debate

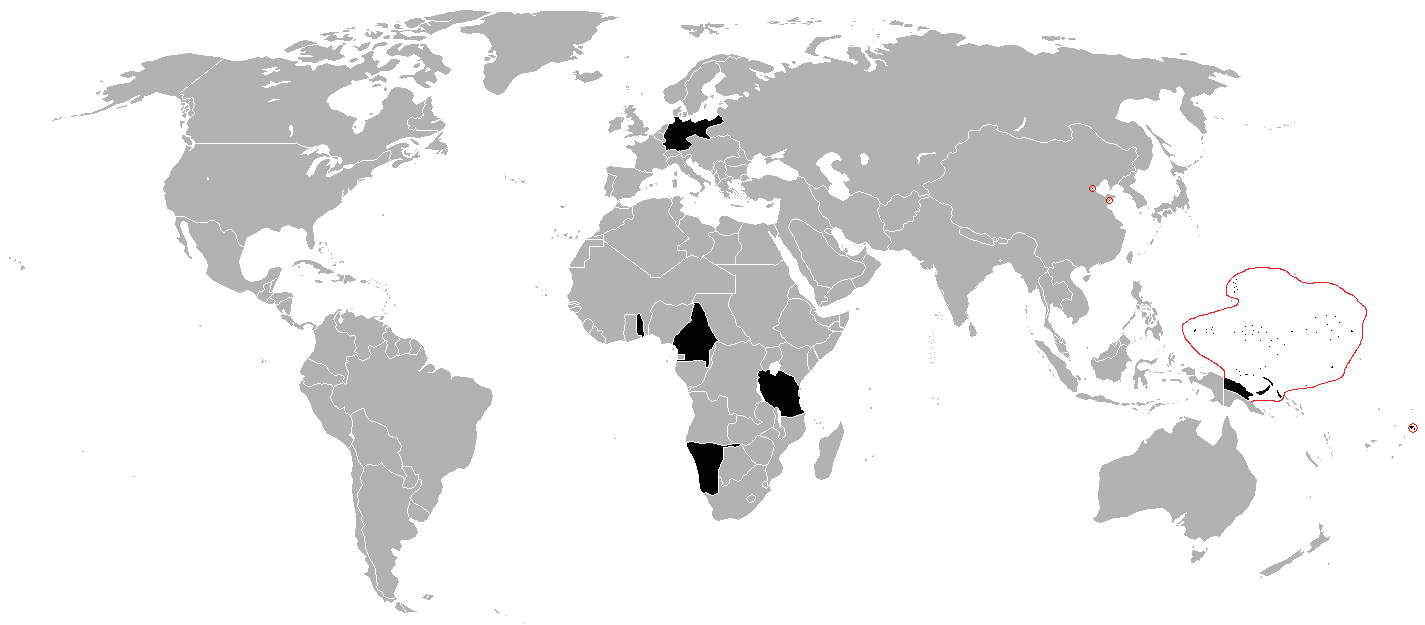
A map of the German colonial empire in 1914

The May 1912 Reichstag debate on interracial marriage (German: Mischehendebatte) was the most significant and explicit discussion of (colonial) racial biopolitics on a national level in the German Empire before World War I. It served as a preparation for the legal regulation of such marriages in the German colonial empire and of the status of children from such unions. It is evidence of the racial-political ideas of German political parties at the time and also of the precursors of the more aggressive racism of the interwar period in Germany. The debate came about during a period when most European governments had outlawed interracial liaisons in their colonies.

== Prelude ==
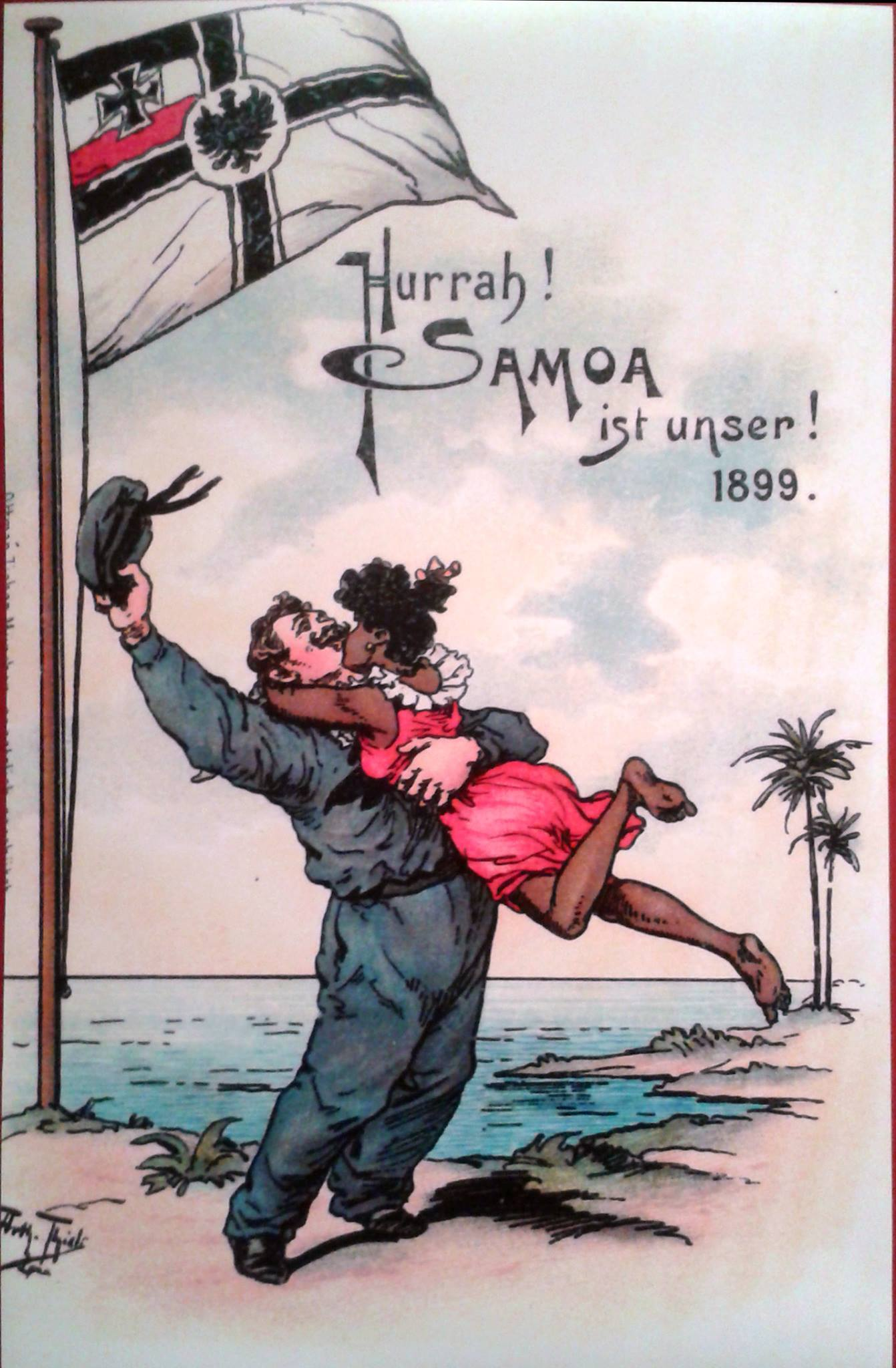
An illustration of an interracial couple in German Samoa, 1899

Most German colonial administrations came to prohibit marriages between Germans and indigenous people. Such a ban on "civil marriages between whites and natives" had been enacted in South West Africa in 1905. The governor of East Africa reserved for himself the right to decide in such cases in 1906. Even marriages contracted before this ban were nullified in South West Africa in 1907.

The Reichstag was not consulted for these administrative ordinances. On 17 January 1912, the Reich Colonial Office led by State Secretary Wilhelm Solf enforced a distinction between legitimate and illegitimate mixed-race children for Samoa, on top of the previous marriage ban. Only those children who had been entered into special lists before, could claim a right to citizenship and alimony. All children born later (who, by the new law, had to be extramarital anyway) were treated as illegitimate, without claims to their fathers or their country. In March 1912 in the Reich Budget Commission for the Colonies, the Social Democrats requested the legalisation of mixed marriages and the right to alimony also for extramarital children. Concurrently, a resolution was put before the Federal Council to draw up a law restricting the colonies' ability for ordinances and extending the Reichstag's influence there.

According to reports of 1907 and 1908, there were 34 mixed-race couples and 170 mixed-race people in New Guinea; 90 couples and 938 descendants in Samoa; 42 couples and 3,595 descendants in South West Africa (among them the Basters whose loyalty in putting down the Herero uprising was noted).

== Course of the debate ==
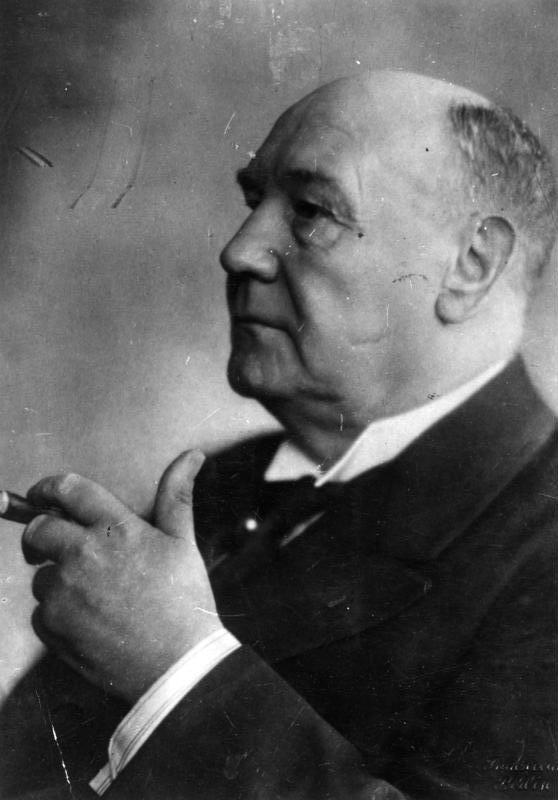
Wilhelm Solf in 1911

In the 53rd meeting of the Reichstag's 13th session, on 2 May 1912, State Secretary for the Colonies Wilhelm Solf initiated a fundamental debate on the mixed-race question and the problem of mixed marriages, depicting it in dramatic terms. He argued, the "vicious consequences of mixed marriages" to be recognised by all nations whose "calling for colonisation brought them in touch with coloured peoples of low culture and inferior civilisation." He pointed out the United States as a special example: "Misunderstood humanity takes its toll, just as the undignified descent down to the inferior race." Solf proclaimed to be "against slavery, self-evidently", but he claimed, "the Negro must have felt better in the old, patriarchal conditions of the Old South than he is feeling now, internally, as a human." Today, "the Negro could even become President if he is not lynched before." Solf argued that lynchings would continue to occur until "national law and popular sentiment are in agreement." Afterwards, he appealed to the deputies (all male) to consider whether they wanted "black daughters-in-law" and "woolly-haired grandchildren." The German Colonial Society, he said, was spending 50,000 Mark annually for "white girls" to be sent to South West Africa. Solf: "Do you want that these white girls return with Hereros, with Hottentots and Bastards as spouses?" He resumed his point with: "We are Germans, we are whites, and we want to stay Germans." In relation to the "coloureds", "even the proletarian is a master", he added. Therefore, Solf turned explicitly to the Social Democrats, the parliament's strongest party since 1912, for support, arguing that not the wealthy man would be tempted "out there" to marry an indigenous woman, but "the poor man, the little man." However, Wilhelm Solf, who was considered liberal and understanding when he was governor of German Samoa from 1900 to 1911, did not find the wide support he wished for.

Georg Ledebour, a Social Democrat, answered that Solf did not really care for the institution of marriage but for the legitimacy of the offspring. He argued: "As soon as these young people in their most vigorous age come into contact with subdued peoples, when there are no or only so few white women that they could not enter marriage at all", mixed-race children would then be the "inevitable result in all colonies, not only Germany's." To avoid this, the colonies would have to be abandoned, while Solf only wanted to "eradicate the intercourse." Ledebour criticised the mixed-marriage ban with special reference to Samoa where there were about 80 of them. Exactly because Samoans were closer to whites culturally than Hereros or Hottentots, intercourse with them was of a higher level, he argued. The Social Democrat accused Solf of the fear that "the influx of white blood" into Samoa would give rise to "a part-white, part-Samoan population, like the Basters of South West Africa who descended from Dutchmen and Hottentots", which would strengthen the natives' ability to resist. Thereby, Ledebour adopted an argument of Friedrich von Lindequist, governor of South West Africa, who had warned in 1906 in a paper on colonial policy about "the numbers of mixed unions" and "the vicious consequences of racial mixing", "because in South Africa, the white minority is forced to keep up its rule over coloured people by maintaining its racial purity." Although Lebedour spoke as a critic of "capitalist colonial policy" and of its need to maintain whites as "master race separate from the natives", but nevertheless he saw it as "an undesirable state [...] when marriages between natives and whites are contracted or when there [is] extramarital intercourse resulting in mixed-race people." He was also filled with indignation by "white women flirting with negroes here in Germany." He also pointed out the "unpleasant" fact that "certain women" had developed a "perverse affinity" to "exotic tribals", calling this a sign of bourgeois decadence.

The liberal deputy Carl Braband (Free-minded People's Party) similarly criticised during the debate that at the occasion of "displays of exotic troupes of Nubians, Negroes and Singhalese", "white women almost threw themselves at the foreign guests." Braband rejected mixed-marriages and the resulting children as a plainly pathological phenomenon and advocated at the same time for the "prevention" of "marriage between persons with severe infectious or hereditary diseases." In the light of the large gender imbalance among whites in the colonies, he conceded "sexual mixing" between colonists and "coloured women" to be inevitable. But he saw the "growth of a mixed race" as a "danger" which the German "Man of Culture" could only counter by carefully supervising the mixed-breeds' educations."

Karl von Richthofen-Damsdorf, a National Liberal, regarded "sexual unions between whites and coloureds" as a "sexual immorality" which should not be "officially approved of."

Rev. Johannes Zürn, a Protestant pastor of the German Reich Party, put forward the hypothesis that "children arising from mixed marriages [develop] towards the bad side." He invoked "healthy, national race-consciousness" and condemned "any facilitation of racial mixing in our colonies."

Karl von Böhlendorff-Kölpin (German Conservative Party) demanded a "sharp segregation" of the races and "educating our colonial citizens" against mixed marriages and cohabitation. He argued that even the head of the Catholic mission in South West Africa called brothels "the lesser evil" in contrast with these "immoral" practices.

Reinhard Mumm, a Christian Socialist of the Economic Union, criticised that "a certain female lowlife" in the big cities "associates with Black men" and demanded as the "sharpest reaction" enshrining the rejection of such "racial defilement" in "the people's consciousness." However, the Christian Socialists regarded a marriage ban as ineffective as the neighbouring colonial powers had no such laws, and thereby a marriage could easily be contracted on their territory. Therefore, Mumm advocated promoting the "marriage among whites in the colonies" and sending only "married officials to the colonies."

Eduard David (SPD)

Eduard David, a revisionist Social Democrat, held a more relaxed and less racist position. He argued that the offspring of such pairings were an "eminently beautiful and healthy people." Appearances could be found there that had to be regarded as "typical beauties of the human race." Race loyalty fails there, he said, or it would be inverted into its opposite: some whites might want not to degrade but to improve their progeny by such a union. But even David conceded: "We do not wish either that a mixed population is engendered haphazardly."

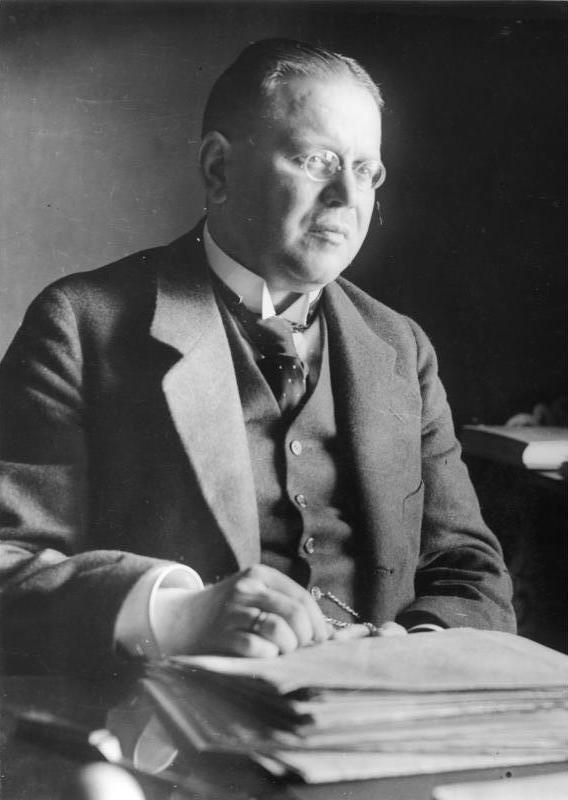
Centrist leader Mattias Erzberger in 1919

The Centrist deputy Adolf Gröber agreed with David in praising beauty. He showed pictures of a "Bastard girl" and of Samoan girls in parliament and commented: "Quite nice. You can't find nicer ones among our ones." The Centre argued for legalising these unions, also because of their numerical insignificance.

Mattias Erzberger, leader of the Centrists, also argued "against the proliferation of mixed-breeds." "99 per cent of all mixed-breeds in the colonies result from extramarital intercourse", he claimed. Therefore, it were nonsense to ban mixed marriages, as the fight against miscegenation had to be fought by fighting cohabitation, not by banning marriage which would only increase cohabitation.

== Results ==
At the end of its debate, the Reichstag passed a resolution on 8 May 1912 that asked the government to draw up a law to "ensure the validity of marriages between whites and natives in all German colonies" and to determine the rights of illegitimate children. 203 deputies (Social Democrats, Centre and some Free-minders) voted Yea, 133 voted Nay, and 1 abstained. However, this law was never drawn up or passed as World War I began only two years later, at the end of which Germany lost all its colonies.

== See also ==
- German colonies
- Interracial marriage
- Rassenschande, "race defilement", later used extensively by the Nazis to denote undesirable interethnic marriages
- Nuremberg Laws, the Nazi laws banning interracial marriage, among others

== Bibliography ==
- Proceedings of the Reichstag, 53rd to 56th meetings of 2nd, 3rd, 7th and 8th May 1912. pp. 1648–1747.
- Schwarz, Thomas (2002). "Die Mischehendebatte im Reichstag 1912: Hybridität in den Verhandlungen zwischen deutscher Biopolitik, Anthropologie und Literatur" [The mixed marriage debate in the Reichstag 1912. Hybridity in negotiations between German biopolitics, anthropology and literature]. Dokilomunhak (in German). 19: 323–350. ISSN 1229-1560.
- Kundrus, Birthe [in German] (2003). Moderne Imperialisten: das Kaiserreich im Spiegel seiner Kolonien [Modern Imperialists. The Empire as reflected in its colonies] (in German). Köln Weimar Wien: Böhlau. ISBN 978-3-412-18702-6.
- Sobich, Frank Oliver (2006). "Schwarze Bestien, rote Gefahr": Rassimus und Antisozialismus im deutschen Kaiserreich [Black Beasts, Red Peril. Racism and Antisocialism in the German Empire]. Campus Forschung (in German). Vol. 909. Frankfurt/Main New York: Campus-Verlag. ISBN 978-3-593-38189-3.
- Przyrembel, Alexandra [in German] (2003). "Rassenschande": Reinheitsmythos und Vernichtungslegitimation im Nationalsozialismus ["Racial defilement". The myth of purity and the legitimisation of extermination in National Socialism]. Veröffentlichungen des Max-Planck-Instituts für Geschichte (in German). Vol. 190. Göttingen: Vandenhoeck und Ruprecht. ISBN 978-3-525-35188-8.
