= Defence of India act and Defence of India rules, 1962 =

The Defence of India act and Defence of India rules, 1962 were a set of emergency war-time legislations for preventive detention enacted in October 1962 India during the Sino-Indian War of 1962. It was initially promulgated as a Presidential ordinance, the Defence of India Ordinance, 1962 on 28 October that year under the authority of which the Defence of India Rules were enacted. In December 1962, the Indian Parliament enacted the Defence of India act, 1962 which consolidated the continued application of the ordinance as law. The act consisted of 156 rules that "regulated virtually all aspects of life" including travel, finance, trade, communication, publication etc. and were essentially identical to the Defence of India act, 1939 enacted during World War II. The act suspended the Fundamental rights of any person held under the act, and specifically Rule 30 of the act allowed the government to hold any person in detention without explanation suspending the right under the article 22 of Constitution of India, without the right to representation, and without the provisions of Habeas corpus.

The act was infamous in having been used on Indians of Chinese ethnicity during and after the 1962 Sino-India war. Many of them were taken from border towns in Northeast India like Darjeeling and Kalimpong along with other Chinese Indians living in Assam and Kolkata, and incarcerated in a detention camp in Deoli, in the state of Rajasthan. The act was also used during emergency against those who opposed emergency but two months later high court acquitted all arrested under this act.

== See also ==
- Defence of India Act, 1915
- Internment of Chinese-Indians
