= Polyara, Rajasthan =

Polyara
- village
- Country: India
- State: Rajasthan

Population (2011)
  - Total: 1,277

Languages
  - Official: Hindi, Rajasthani
- Time zone: UTC+5:30 (IST)
- ISO 3166 code: RJ-IN
- Vehicle registration: RJ-

Polyara is a village in the gram panchayat of Deoli in Tonk district of Rajasthan. It is situated on NH12.and 12 km far from Deoli on the Jaipur road. Polyara is surrounding by a water runnel. In the wet season you can enter in village with the help of bridges.

Polyara had a population of 1277 people according to the 2011 census. It had a 52% literacy rate in the same census.

Even 5–10 years ago there were many child marriages, but the number is reducing. Few people have government jobs. In new generation only 4-5 people are getting these jobs. The rest of the people are self-employed, and most work in agriculture. In Polyara there is no post office, no bank, one secondary school and there is no hospital. The people have to reach Deoli for every requirements, even if they want some cloths, shoes, seed, electrical items they need to go Deoli.
