= Internment of Chinese Indians =

Mass incarceration in India during the Sino-Indian War

The internment of Chinese Indians was the forced relocation and incarceration of 3,000 Chinese Indians in an internment camp in Deoli, Rajasthan during the Sino-Indian War in 1962. They were detained without trial as per the Defence of India Act, 1962. The internees were released in a phase by phase manner until the last internee was released in 1967. After the internment, many Chinese Indians (Indians with Chinese ancestry) were resettled with equal rights, and some were deported or coerced to leave India. Nearly all internees had their properties sold off or looted.

Indian officials openly compare the internment of Chinese Indians with the internment of Japanese Americans during World War II. However, unlike the United States, the Indian government has not apologised or offered compensation to the internees.

== Background ==
=== Chinese community in India ===
The earliest recorded Chinese settlers in British India arrived in Calcutta in 1780. Because of the long history of tea cultivation in China, the British colonial authorities attempted to lure experienced workers from China to work on the newly established tea plantations in Assam, starting in 1838. Other Chinese migrants were refugees from poverty, famine, and disasters in China. By the late 19th century, the people of Chinese origin had gained a reputation as craftsmen and traders in East India. During World War II and the Chinese Communist Revolution, a large wave of Chinese war refugees settled in Calcutta, Northern Bengal, and Northeast India. By the end of World War II, the Chinese Indian population was estimated by the British colonial government to be 26,250. Estimates of the ethnic Chinese population in 1962 varied from 20,000 to 60,000.

=== 1962 Sino-Indian War ===
Following the independence of the Republic of India in 1947 and the founding of the People's Republic of China in 1949, the two countries enjoyed a period of friendly relationship, despite having unresolved border disputes in the areas of NEFA and Aksai Chin. The relationship deteriorated, however, after the construction of a Chinese highway in Aksai Chin in 1957, and India's support of the failed 1959 Tibetan uprising against Chinese rule. The hostilities culminated in the brief 1962 Sino-Indian War, resulting in a Chinese victory but no change in the effective boundary between the two countries. The fighting lasted from 10 October to 20 November 1962. On 21 November, China declared ceasefire and withdrew from NEFA, the larger of the two disputed territories, but kept the smaller Aksai Chin.

== Anti-Chinese sentiment ==
After the outbreak of the war, the Indian government and some members of academia systematically portrayed the Chinese minority as untrustworthy and deceitful. The rising nationalism in India entailed assaults on the ethnic Chinese, including Indian citizens and residents who had lived in India for generations. Many Chinese schools and media were shut down, and people of Chinese descent were assaulted by mainstream Indians; their property, restaurants, and shops damaged.

The civil liberties of the ethnic Chinese were curtailed. People of Chinese descent were required to report to the authorities for "registration and classification", and it became harder for non-citizens to meet the residency requirements. The legal definition of foreigners was extended to include Indian citizens of Chinese descent.

Faced with widespread hostility, many Chinese Indians expressed their support and loyalty for the Indian cause, condemned the Chinese government, and donated to India's defence funds. However, their expressions of support were met with suspicion and contempt.

== Internment and deportation ==
After the war, India passed the Defence of India Act in December 1962, permitting the "apprehension and detention in custody of any person [suspected] of being of hostile origin". The broad language of the act allowed for the arrest of any person simply for having a Chinese surname or a Chinese spouse. Under this law, 10,000 people of Chinese origin were estimated to have been detained from all over India, including Calcutta, Bombay, Darjeeling, Kalimpong, Jamshedpur, and the Northeast. All of them were accused of being spies, but not a single charge has ever been proven. The internment of Chinese Indians violated both the Constitution of India and the Universal Declaration of Human Rights, to which India was an original signatory.

Starting in November 1962, many ethnic Chinese were given the order to leave India within a month. About 7,500 people complied and left for various parts of the world, including mainland China, Taiwan, Hong Kong, Pakistan, Japan, Australia, the United Kingdom, the United States, and Canada. People who could not raise travel expenses or were unwilling to leave were imprisoned. While some were held in local prisons, thousands more were transported across India to the desert prison camp in Deoli, Rajasthan, built by the colonial authorities in 1942 as a POW camp for Japanese, German, and Italian prisoners of war during World War II. The camp housed 7,000 inmates, 60% of whom were children or elderly people. Many POWs, unaccustomed to the hot desert climate, died of heat stroke and related diseases.

In 1964, the Deoli prison authorities announced that all internees would be deported to China. The forcible deportations were arbitrary, resulting in the breakup of many families. In many cases parents were separated from their children and never heard from them again. The deportations stopped after a few months, and the government offered the remaining inmates the option to migrate to China. Some took the offer, but about 2,500 chose to stay and wait for the chance to return home.

In 1965, the Indian government began to release the internees. They were allowed to leave the camp in small batches. The last internees were released from Deoli in mid-1967, after four and half years of captivity. However, when the internees were transported to their old neighbourhoods, the local governments often did not know what to do with them and kept them in local prisons, in some cases for more than a year.

== Aftermath ==
After the internees were freed after years of incarceration, many discovered that their properties had been sold off in their absence, but were only offered tiny sums for compensation. Almost all internees had their homes, shops, and factories plundered or taken over by locals.

The Chinese population in Calcutta decreased by half, from 20,000 to 10,000. Those who remained were seen as enemies, and most could not hold any job except in the restaurant, tanning, and shoemaking businesses. Moreover, their movements were restricted. Until the mid-1980s, the Chinese Indians were required to report to designated police stations once a month; until the mid-1990s, they had to apply for special permits to travel more than a few kilometres from their homes.

== Reactions ==
Indian officials openly compare the internment of Chinese Indians with the internment of Japanese Americans during World War II. However, unlike the United States, the Indian government has refused to apologise or offer compensation to the internees for their incarceration.

When asked about his opinion on the issue in 2008, Mao Siwei, China's Consul General in Calcutta, replied that China would rather "look forward and not argue too much about the past".

The Indian Chinese Association has been pressuring the Indian government to issue an apology, without success. The Association of India Deoli Camp Internees, a Canadian non-profit group, wrote two open letters to former Prime Minister of India Manmohan Singh, but did not receive a reply.

In 2004, Rafeeq Ellias recounted the appalling treatment of the Chinese residents in Calcutta in the documentary film The Legend of Fat Mama. The documentary won the Silver Lotus Award for best anthropological/ethnographic film at the 52nd National Film Awards.
