= Deoli, Rajasthan =

Deoli Chhavni
- City
- Nickname: Chhavni
- Location in Rajasthan, India Deoli (India)
- Coordinates: 25.75°N 75.3833°E
- Country: India
- State: Rajasthan
- District: Tonk

Government
  - Type: Nagar Palika
  - Body: Deoli Nagar Palika
- Elevation: 296 m (971 ft)

Population (2011)
  - Total: 29,238

Languages
  - Official: Hindi , Marwari and Dhundhari (Rajasthani)
- Time zone: UTC+5:30 (IST)
- PIN: 304804
- Vehicle registration: RJ26
- Website: http://urban.rajasthan.gov.in/content/raj/udh/nagar-palika-deoli/en/home.html footnotes =

Deoli is a city and municipal council in Tonk district in the Indian state of Rajasthan. It is located 64 km from Tonk City, the district headquarter. situated at the point at which Tonk and Bundi districts meet, though the bulk of the city is located in Shahpura and Tonk districts. It is officially a part of Tonk district. It is the tehsil headquarters of the Deoli tehsil.

It is located 64 from Tonk and 85 km from Kota. Deoli is surrounded by Todaraisingh Tehsil towards North, Kekri Tehsil towards West, Hindoli Tehsil towards South, Jahazpur Tehsil towards South.

Todaraisingh, Tonk, Malpura, Shahpura are the nearby Cities to Deoli

This Place is in the border of the Tonk District and Ajmer District. Ajmer District Kekri is west towards this place.

To facilitate the administration, Deoli Tehsil is further divided into 1 town and 186 villages.

== Demographics ==
Deoli had total population of 214,408 as per the 2011 Census. Of those 110,648 are male and 103,760 are female, comprising 43,632 families. 14% of residents are children of aged six and under, (15928 boys and 14195 girls, a child sex ratio of 891) The male literacy rate is 66.52% and the female literacy rate is 37.54%.

10.3% people lives in urban areas while 89.7% live in rural areas. The average literacy rate in urban areas is 86.7% while that in the rural areas is 58%. The sex ratio in urban areas is 837, and 950 in rural areas.

Scheduled castes constituted 21.1% of the population and Scheduled tribes were 20.4%.

	Total	Male	Female	Urban	Rural
Population	214,408	110,648	103,760	22,065	192,343
Children (Age 0-6)	30,123	15,928	14,195	2,537	27,586
Literacy	61.07%	66.52%	37.54%	86.72%	58.03%
Scheduled Caste	45,292	23,322	21,970	4,122	42,893
Scheduled Tribe	43,738	22,749	20,989	845	42,893
Sex ratio	938			837	950

=== Religion ===
Religion in Deoli, Rajasthan
1. Hindu 94.83 (93.6%)
2. Muslim 3.31 (3.27%)
3. Jain 1.67 (1.65%)
4. Christian 0.7 (0.69%)
5. Sikh 0.7 (0.69%)
6. Buddhist 0.1 (0.10%)
7. Other or not stated 0 (0.00%)

Nearly 95% of Deoli's residents are Hindus, with small numbers of Muslims, Jains, Sikhs, Christians, and Buddhists.

=== Working population ===
In Deoli Tehsil out of a total population, 105,918 were engaged in work activities. 72.3% of workers describe their work as 'main work' (employment or earning for more than six months) while 27.7% were involved in marginal activity providing a livelihood for less than six months. Of 105,918 workers engaged in main work, 43,529 were cultivators (owner or co-owner) while 9,757 were agricultural workers or labourers.

	Total	Male	Female
Main Workers	76,613	49,137	27,476
Cultivators	43,529	25,473	18,056
Agriculture/Labourer	9,757	4,550	5,207
Household Industries	1,440	1,024	416
Other Workers	21,887	18,090	3,797
Marginal Workers	29,305	10,378	18,927
Not Working	108,490	51,133	57,357

== History ==
The town of Deoli was established by the British in 1854, earlier it was a small village. It is believed that the name Deoli came from the Hindi word Devro (देवरों), meaning "Place of Gods", due to the existence of many temples to Hindu deities. It has a reservoir, "Nayanabhiram" or "Nekchal" Lake, literally meaning "good motive lake". This British-made lake was constructed to fight drought and scarcity of water. The cost of acquiring land, incurred for construction of Camp Deoli, by the British, was Rs. 368 at the time. Although most of the princely states of Rajasthan had accepted the sovereignty of the British, the British officials remained skeptical about the intentions of the annexed states. In order to overcome this, a regulation was passed, making it mandatory to keep a conservator from the annexed princely state under the control of a British agent. This agent was referred to as Rokadia; although they had all the facilities they were, in a way, under the detention of the British Government. The present Senior Secondary School building was the bungalow of the then political agent, which had a swimming pool. Similarly, the famous Nevar Bagh (नेवर बाग) was also developed by the English agent. A swimming pool was also built here which has now been dumped. Today's CISF set-up was originally a prison. There is also a "फांसीघर" (gallows) board which is visible at the gate of the facility which remains a relic of the past. German and Italian civilians were interned here after the British declaration of war in 1939. Later prisoners of the Indian freedom struggle were kept here.

After the 1962 Sino-Indian War, approximately 3000 Indian citizens of Chinese origin along with Tibetans suspected of being Chinese agents were interned here, some till 1967.

The church was established here during the British period. It is said to be about a hundred years old. There is a medieval pilgrimage center around the Deoli, which includes Boeyda Ganeshji (in the nearby village of Boeyda), Kunchalvada-Mata, Chandali Mata (in the nearby village of Chandali), Gokarneshwar Mahadev, Ravata Hanuman ji, Gadoli Mahadev, Lakdeshwar Mahadev, Hindeshwar Mahadev etc. Amongst these, there is a story associated with Hindeshwar Mahadev of Hindoli that, during exile, the Pandavas built this Shiva Lingam with only five fistfuls of clay (पाँच मुटृठी (धोबे)). There is also a folklore that ten-headed Ravana performed Shiva Worshipping in nearby Bisalpur at Gokarneshwar Mahadev Temple.

== Places ==
Deoli is 176.5 km from Jaipur and 64.8 km (56 min) away from Tonk. The nearest Railway Station is Bundi, 45 km away. The nearest airport is in Jaipur International Airport, 79 km away.

Deoli has a CISF training center. RTC Deoli was established on 1 August 1984. It is located in District Tonk, Post Deoli, Rajasthan, which is 165 kilometres (103 miles) away from Jaipur Airport and 85 kilometres (53 miles) from Kota Railway Station. RTC Deoli conducts the basic induction training of directly recruited Constables. It also provides professional and specialized training to officers and men of CISF and other private security organizations.

The Bisalpur Dam on the Banas River is a multipurpose scheme, which supplies water for drinking and irrigation to Jaipur district and Ajmer, Beawar, Nasirabad and Kishangarh towns of Ajmer district. The dam was constructed in 1993–94.

=== Villages ===
- Polyara
