= Mixed Race Day =

Annual celebration on 27 June in Brazil

- Observed by: Brazil
- Type: National
- Celebrations: Racial equality, multiculturalism
- Date: June 27
- Next time: June 27, 2026
- Frequency: Annual

In Brazil, "Mixed Race Day" (Dia do Mestiço) is observed annually on June 27, three days after the Day of the Caboclo, in celebration of all mixed-race Brazilians, including the caboclos. The date is an official public holiday in three Brazilian states.

== History ==
Mixed Race Day marks the election of twenty-seven mixed-race representatives during the 1st Conference for the Promotion of Racial Equality, which occurred in the city of Manaus from April 7 to 9, 2005.

It also recognizes the month of June, in which caboclo activist Helda Castro was registered as the only mixed-race representative in the 1st National Conference for the Promotion of Racial Equality, which was held in Brasília (June 30 to July 2, 2005) and was sponsored by the Government of Brazil.

Manaus established "Mixed Race Day" as an official day of the city on January 6, 2006. The recognition was adopted by other cities and four States: 2006, by the Brazilian State of Amazonas and by the city of Boa Vista, in State of Roraima; 2007, by the State of Roraima and the State of Paraíba; 2016, by the State of Mato Grosso.

== Similar days celebrating racial groups in Brazil ==
- The "Day of the Caboclo" (Dia do Caboclo) is observed annually on June 24, in celebration of the contributions and identity of the original caboclos and their descendants. This date is an official public holiday in the State of Amazonas.
- "Indigenous Peoples Day" (Dia dos Povos Indígenas), observed annually on April 19, recognizes and honours the indigenous peoples of Brazil.
- "Black Awareness Day" (Dia da Consciência Negra) is observed annually on November 20 as a day "to celebrate a regained awareness by the black community about their great worth and contribution to the country". The date is an official public holiday in five Brazilian states.

== See also ==
- Loving Day
