= Defence of India Act, 1939 =

Defence of India Act,1939

The Governor-General in Council
- Long title: An Act to provide for special measures to ensure the public safety and interest and the defence of British India and for the trial of certain offences.
- Citation: Act No. XXXV of 1939
- Territorial extent: Whole of British India
- Enacted by: The Governor-General in Council
- Enacted: 29 September 1939
- Commenced: 3 September 1939

Repeals
- Repealed by Act II of 1948

The Defence of India Act, 1939 (No.35) was an Act passed by the Central Legislature on the 29th day of September, 1939 which effectively declared martial law in India. Although it was enacted on 29 September 1939 it was deemed to come into force from 3 September 1939, the day when the World War II began. It provided the Viceroy to make rules for the safety of British India and to provide punishments in case of any contraventions which included that of death or transportation for life if the intent was to assist any rival state at war with His Majesty or that of waging war against His Majesty. It provided for Special Courts against whose verdict nobody can appeal from, and these Courts may decide to hold the trial in camera. It also provided for the acquisition of land for purposes of defence and it provided compensation for the land acquired. It expired six months after the termination of the war and was ultimately repealed by the Repealing and Amending Act, 1947 (Act II of 1948).

== See also ==
- Defence of India act, 1915
- Defence of India act, 1962
