= Comparative ranks of Nazi Germany =

The comparative ranks of Nazi Germany contrasts the ranks of the Wehrmacht to a number of Nazi Party organizations in Nazi Germany from 1933 to 1945 in a synoptic table. Nazi organizations used a hierarchical structure, according to the so-called Führerprinzip (leader principle), and were oriented in line with the rank order system of the Wehrmacht.

== Nazi rank structure in comparison to the Wehrmacht ==
=== Officer ranks ===
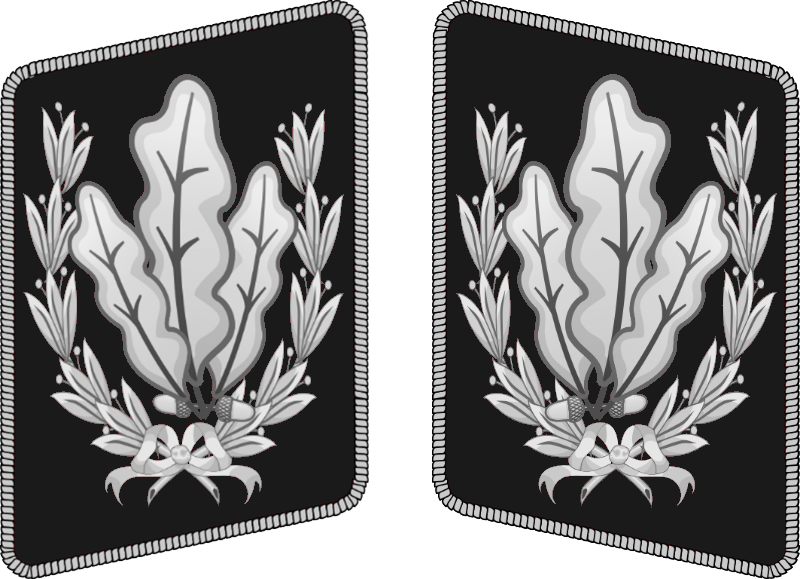
Equivalent UK Army	None	Field marshal	General		Lieutenant-general	Major-general	Brigadier	Colonel		Lieutenant-colonel		Major			Captain			Lieutenant		Second lieutenant
(Nazi Germany) Heer & Luftwaffe	Reichs-marschall
(Nazi Germany) Heer & Luftwaffe	Reichs-marschall	Generalfeldmarschall	Generaloberst		General der Waffengattung	Generalleutnant	Generalmajor	Oberst		Oberstleutnant		Major			Hauptmann			Oberleutnant		Leutnant
(Nazi Germany) Kriegsmarine	Reichs-marschall
(Nazi Germany) Kriegsmarine	Reichs-marschall	Großadmiral	Generaladmiral		Admiral	Vizeadmiral	Konteradmiral	Kommodore	Kapitän zur See	Fregattenkapitän		Korvettenkapitän			Kapitänleutnant			Oberleutnant zur See		Leutnant zur See
Technische Nothilfe (TENO)
Technische Nothilfe (TENO)						Chef der TN	Stellvertretender chef der TN	TN-Landesführer	TN-Bezirksführer	TN-Hauptbereitschaftsführer		TN-Bereitschaftsführer			TN-Gefolgschaftsführer			TN-Gemeinschaftsführer		TN-Kameradschaftsführer
German Red Cross (DRK)
German Red Cross (DRK)						Generalhauptführer	Generalführer	Oberstführer		Oberfeldführer		Feldführer			Hauptführer			Oberwachführer		Wachführer
Equivalent UK Army	None	Field marshal	General		Lieutenant-general	Major-general	Brigadier	Colonel		Lieutenant-colonel		Major			Captain			Lieutenant		Second lieutenant
Waffen-SS & Allgemeine SS	No insignia
Waffen-SS & Allgemeine SS	Oberster Führer der Schutzstaffel	Reichsführer-SS (Note: Heinrich Himmler's title became an actual rank after the Night of the Long Knives in 1934. From that point on, Reichsführer-SS became the highest rank of the SS and was considered on paper the equivalent of a Generalfeldmarschall in the Wehrmacht; however, as Himmler's position and authority grew in Nazi Germany, so did his rank in a "de facto" sense.)	SS-Oberst-Gruppenführer (Note: Decree paper of the Waffen-SS, 3rd (annual) volume – Berlin, June 15, 1942 – number 12 – p.46: “The Reichsführer-SS gave order regarding the spelling of the new service rank “SS-Oberst-Gruppenführer” (quotation: “SS-Oberst-Gruppenführer” (en: SS-Supreme-Group leader]), in order to avoid confusion to the SS-Obergruppenführer (en: SS-Senior group leader)”.)		SS-Obergruppenführer	SS-Gruppenführer	SS-Brigadeführer	SS-Oberführer	SS-Standartenführer	SS-Obersturmbannführer		SS-Sturmbannführer			SS-Hauptsturmführer (Note: Until castration of the SA in summer 1934 the designation of that particular rank in the SS was SS-Sturmhauptführer (SS-Storm head leader). However, the rank was renamed to SS-Hauptsturmführer (SS-Head storm leader). In line with the formation of the SA-Defence crews (SA-Wehrmannschaften) in 1939/40 it was renamed to “Hauptsturmführer” in the SA and in all other Nazi organizations.)			SS-Obersturmführer		SS-Untersturmführer
Ordnungspolizei (Orpo)
Ordnungspolizei (Orpo)		Chef der Deutschen Polizei	Generaloberst der Polizei		General der Polizei	Generalleutnant der Polizei	Generalmajor der Polizei	Oberst der Polizei		Oberstleutnant der Polizei		Major der Polizei			Hauptmann der Polizei			Oberleutnant der Polizei		Leutnant der Polizei
Sturmabteilung (SA)	No insignia
Sturmabteilung (SA)	Oberster SA-Führer	Stabschef SA			SA-Obergruppenführer	SA-Gruppenführer	SA-Brigadeführer	SA-Oberführer	SA-Standartenführer	SA-Obersturmbannführer		SA-Sturmbannführer			SA-Hauptsturmführer (until 1939 SA-Sturmhauptführer)			SA-Obersturmführer		SA-Sturmführer
National Socialist Motor Corps (NSKK)
National Socialist Motor Corps (NSKK)		NSKK-Korpsführer			NSKK-Obergruppenführer	NSKK-Gruppenführer	NSKK-Brigadeführer	NSKK-Oberführer	NSKK-Standartenführer	NSKK-Obersturmbannführer		NSKK-Sturmbannführer			NSKK-Hauptsturmführer			NSKK-Obersturmführer		NSKK-Sturmführer
National Socialist Flyers Corps (NSFK)
National Socialist Flyers Corps (NSFK)		NSFK-Korpsführer	NSFK-Ehrenführer		NSFK-Obergruppenführer	NSFK-Gruppenführer	NSFK-Brigadeführer	NSFK-Oberführer	NSFK-Standartenführer	NSFK-Obersturmbannführer		NSFK-Sturmbannführer			NSFK-Hauptsturmführer			NSFK-Obersturmführer		NSFK-Sturmführer
Reichsluftschutzbund (RLB)
Reichsluftschutzbund (RLB)			RLB-Präsident			GeneralHauptluftschutzführer	Generalluftschutzführer	Oberstluftschutzführer		Oberststabsluftschutzführer		Stabsluftschutzführer			Hauptluftschutzführer			Oberluftschutzführer		Luftschutzführer
Equivalent UK Army	None	Field marshal	General		Lieutenant-general	Major-general	Brigadier	Colonel		Lieutenant-colonel		Major			Captain			Lieutenant		Second lieutenant
Reich Labour Service (RAD)
Reich Labour Service (RAD)		Reichs-arbeitsführer	Generaloberstfeldmeister		Generalfeldmeister	Obergeneralarbeitsführer	Generalarbeitsführer	Oberstarbeitsführer		Oberarbeitsführer		Arbeitsführer			Oberstfeldmeister			Oberfeldmeister		Feldmeister
Organisation Todt (OT)
Organisation Todt (OT)			Amtschef OT		OT-Einsatzgruppenleiter I	OT-Einsatzgruppenleiter II	OT-Einsatzleiter	OT-Hauptbauleiter		OT-Oberbauleiter		OT-Bauleiter			OT-Hauptbauführer			OT-Oberbauführer		OT-Bauführer
Hitler Youth (HJ)		Reichsjugendführer
Hitler Youth (HJ)		Reichsjugendführer	Stabsführer		Obergebietsführer	Gebietsführer	Hauptbannführer	Oberbannführer	Bannführer	Oberstammführer		Stammführer			Hauptgefolgschaftsführer			Obergefolgschaftsführer		Gefolgschaftsführer
Deutsches Jungvolk (DJ)		Reichsjugendführer
Deutsches Jungvolk (DJ)		Reichsjugendführer								Oberjungstammführer		Jungstammführer			Hauptfähnleinführer			Oberfähnleinführer		Fähnleinführer
League of German Girls & Jungmädelbund		Reichsjugendführer
League of German Girls & Jungmädelbund		Reichsjugendführer			Reichsreferentin	Gebietsmädelführerin	Hauptmädelführerin	Bannmädelführerin				Ringführerin			Hauptgruppenführerin			Gruppenführerin
Nazi Party (NSDAP)	No insignia
Nazi Party (NSDAP)	Führer und Reichskanzler	Reichsleiter	Gauleiter	Hauptbefehlsleiter	Oberbefehlsleiter	Befehlsleiter	Hauptdienstleiter	Oberdienstleiter		Dienstleiter	Hauptbereichsleiter (Kreisleiter)	Bereichsleiter	Hauptabschnittsleiter	Oberabschnittsleiter	Abschnittsleiter	Hauptgemeinschaftsleiter (Ortsgruppenleiter)	Obergemeinschaftsleiter	Gemeinschaftsleiter	Haupteinsatzleiter	Obereinsatzleiter	Einsatzleiter
Equivalent UK Army	None	Field marshal	General		Lieutenant-general	Major-general	Brigadier	Colonel		Lieutenant-colonel		Major			Captain			Lieutenant		Second lieutenant

=== Enlisted ===
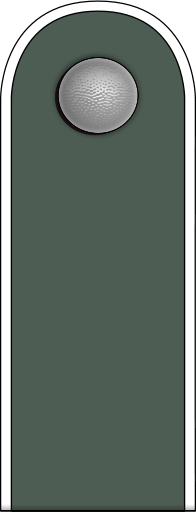
Equivalent UK Army	Regimental sergeant major	Sergeant major		Staff sergeant	Sergeant	Corporal		Lance Corporal					Senior Private	Private (or equivalent)
(Nazi Germany) Heer & Luftwaffe
(Nazi Germany) Heer & Luftwaffe	Stabsfeldwebel	Oberfeldwebel		Feldwebel	Unterfeldwebel	Unteroffizier			Stabsgefreiter	Hauptgefreiter (Note: Used by the Luftwaffe until 1944.)	Obergefreiter	Gefreiter	Obersoldat	Soldat
(Nazi Germany) Kriegsmarine
(Nazi Germany) Kriegsmarine	Stabsoberbootsmann	Oberbootsmann	Stabsbootsmann	Bootsmann	Obermaat	Maat		Matrosenoberstabsgefreiter	Matrosenstabsgefreiter	Matrosenhauptgefreiter	Matrosenobergefreiter	Matrosengefreiter		Matrose
Technische Nothilfe (TENO)
Technische Nothilfe (TENO)	TN-Stabsscharführer	TN-Hauptscharführer		TN-Oberscharführer	TN-Scharführer			TN-Obervormann					TN-Vormann	TN-Mann	TN-Anwärter
German Red Cross (DRK)
German Red Cross (DRK)	DRK-Haupthelfer (mit Zugführer Prüfung)	DRK-Haupthelfer		DRK-Oberhelfer	DRK-Vorhelfer (mit Gruppenführer Prüfung)	DRK-Vorhelfer		DRK-Helfer						DRK-Anwärter
Equivalent UK Army	Regimental sergeant major	Sergeant major		Staff sergeant	Sergeant	Corporal		Lance corporal					Senior Private	Private (or equivalent)
Waffen-SS & Allgemeine SS
Waffen-SS & Allgemeine SS	SS-Sturmscharführer	SS-Hauptscharführer		SS-Oberscharführer	SS-Scharführer	SS-Unterscharführer		SS-Rottenführer			SS-Sturmmann		SS-Oberschütze	SS-Schütze (Note: Mann for the Allgemeine SS)
Ordnungspolizei (Orpo)														No insignia
Ordnungspolizei (Orpo)	Meister	Hauptwachtmeister		Revier; Oberwachtmeister	Oberwachtmeister	Wachtmeister		Rottmeister					Unterwachtmeister	Anwärter
Sturmabteilung (SA)
Sturmabteilung (SA)		SA-Haupttruppführer	SA-Obertruppführer	SA-Truppführer	SA-Oberscharführer	SA-Scharführer		SA-Rottenführer					SA-Sturmmann	SA-Mann
National Socialist Motor Corps (NSKK)
National Socialist Motor Corps (NSKK)		NSKK-Haupttruppführer	NSKK-Obertruppführer	NSKK-Truppführer	NSKK-Oberscharführer	NSKK-Scharführer		NSKK-Rottenführer					NSKK-Sturmmann	NSKK-Mann
National Socialist Flyers Corps (NSFK)
National Socialist Flyers Corps (NSFK)		NSFK-Obertruppführer		NSFK-Truppführer	NSFK-Oberscharführer	NSFK-Scharführer		NSFK-Rottenführer					NSFK-Sturmmann	NSFK-Mann
Reichsluftschutzbund (RLB)
Reichsluftschutzbund (RLB)					Luftschutzobertruppmeister	Luftschutztruppmeister		Luftschutzobertruppwart			Luftschutztruppwart		Luftschutzobertruppmann	Luftschutztruppmann
Equivalent UK Army	Regimental sergeant major	Sergeant major		Staff sergeant	Sergeant	Corporal		Lance corporal					Senior Private	Private (or equivalent)
Reich Labour Service (RAD)
Reich Labour Service (RAD)	Unterfeldmeister			Obertruppführer		Truppführer	Untertruppführer			Hauptvormann	Obervormann	Vormann		Arbeitsmann
Organisation Todt (OT)
Organisation Todt (OT)		OT-Haupttruppführer		OT-Obertruppführer		OT-Truppführer		OT-Obermeister			OT-Meister		OT-Vorarbeiter	OT-Stammarbeiter	OT-Arbeiter
Hitler Youth (HJ)
Hitler Youth (HJ)		Oberscharführer		Scharführer	Oberkameradschaftsführer	Kameradschaftsführer		Oberrottenführer			Rottenführer			Hitlerjunge
Deutsches Jungvolk (DJ)														No insignia
Deutsches Jungvolk (DJ)		Oberjungzugführer		Jungzugführer	Oberjungenschaftsführer	Jungenschaftsführer		Oberhordenführer			Hordenführer			Pimpfe (Note: The youngest members of the Hitler Youth organization in Nazi Germany)
League of German Girls & Jungmädelbund
League of German Girls & Jungmädelbund					(Jung)-Mädelscharführerin	(Jung)-Mädelschaftsführerin								BDM-Mädel / Jungmädel
Nazi Party (NSDAP)
Nazi Party (NSDAP)		Hauptbereitschaftsleiter	Oberbereitschaftsleiter	Bereitschaftsleiter		Hauptarbeitsleiter		Oberarbeitsleiter			Arbeitsleiter		Oberhelfer	Helfer	Anwärter
Equivalent UK Army	Regimental sergeant major	Sergeant major		Staff sergeant	Sergeant	Corporal		Lance corporal					Senior Private	Private (or equivalent)

== See also ==
- Comparative military ranks of World War II
- Glossary of German military terms
- Glossary of Nazi Germany
- World War II German Army ranks and insignia
