= Gerhard Schach =

German Nazi Party official (1906–1945)

Deputy Gauleiter, Gau Berlin
- In office January 1944 – 2 May 1945
- Preceded by: Artur Görlitzer
- Succeeded by: Position abolished

Additional positions
- 1933–1945: Reichstag Deputy
- 1932–1933: Landtag of Prussia Deputy

Personal details
- Born: 8 March 1906 Berlin, Kingdom of Prussia, German Empire
- Died: 2 May 1945 (age 39) Berlin, Nazi Germany
- Cause of death: Suicide
- Party: Nazi Party

Gerhard Paul Julius Schach (8 March 1906 – 2 May 1945) was a German Nazi Party official and protégé of Joseph Goebbels who served as Deputy Gauleiter of Berlin from January 1944 until his death. He died in the Battle in Berlin shortly before Germany's capitulation in the Second World War.

== Early life ==
Born in Berlin, Schach attended the Königstädtisches Gymnasium in that city. He subsequently completed an apprenticeship as a textile salesman at a higher technical school and was employed in that occupation.

== Nazi Party career ==
On 1 August 1928, Schach joined the Nazi Party, where he was assigned the position of Kreisleiter for a section of Berlin. He rose through the ranks of the Party organization under Gauleiter Joseph Goebbels, becoming a Gau Inspector in 1932 and Organisationsleiter (organizational leader) for the Gau Berlin in February 1934. He was also a commissioner for vocational training in the German Labor Front.

After the Nazi seizure of power, Schach was appointed as a deputy to the Landtag of Prussia and served until its dissolution in October 1933. At the November 1933 parliamentary election, he was elected as a deputy to the Reichstag from electoral constituency 3, (Potsdam II, reconfigured in 1936 as Berlin East) and retained this seat until 1945. Schach was also a Berlin Stadtrat (city councilor) from 1935 to 1945 for the Stadtbezirk "Horst Wessel". Schach was appointed Amtsleiter in the Gau Berlin leadership in 1942 and was promoted to the Party rank of Oberdienstleiter on 30 January 1943. A member of the paramilitary National Socialist Motor Corps, he attained the rank of NSKK-Brigadeführer in 1943.

On 4 January 1944, Schach succeeded Artur Görlitzer as Deputy Gauleiter of Berlin. In February 1944, Goebbels assigned Schach to draw up a bunker construction program for the Berlin population to offer 800,000 people protection from air raids in new large bunkers and tunnels in the Kreuzberg district. On 10 February, on the recommendation of Goebbels, Adolf Hitler awarded Schach the Knight's Cross of the War Merit Cross with swords for his efforts in protecting Berlin from British air raids. At that time, he carried the rank of Hauptbereichsleiter.

Schach played a role in the suppression of the attempted overthrow of the Nazi regime of 20 July 1944 when he mediated a conversation between Goebbels and a Leutnant Hans Hagen, who convinced Goebbels to contact Major Otto Ernst Remer, the commander of the Wachregiment Berlin. As a result of this contact, Goebbels persuaded Remer to initiate measures suppressing the uprising in the city.

== Death ==
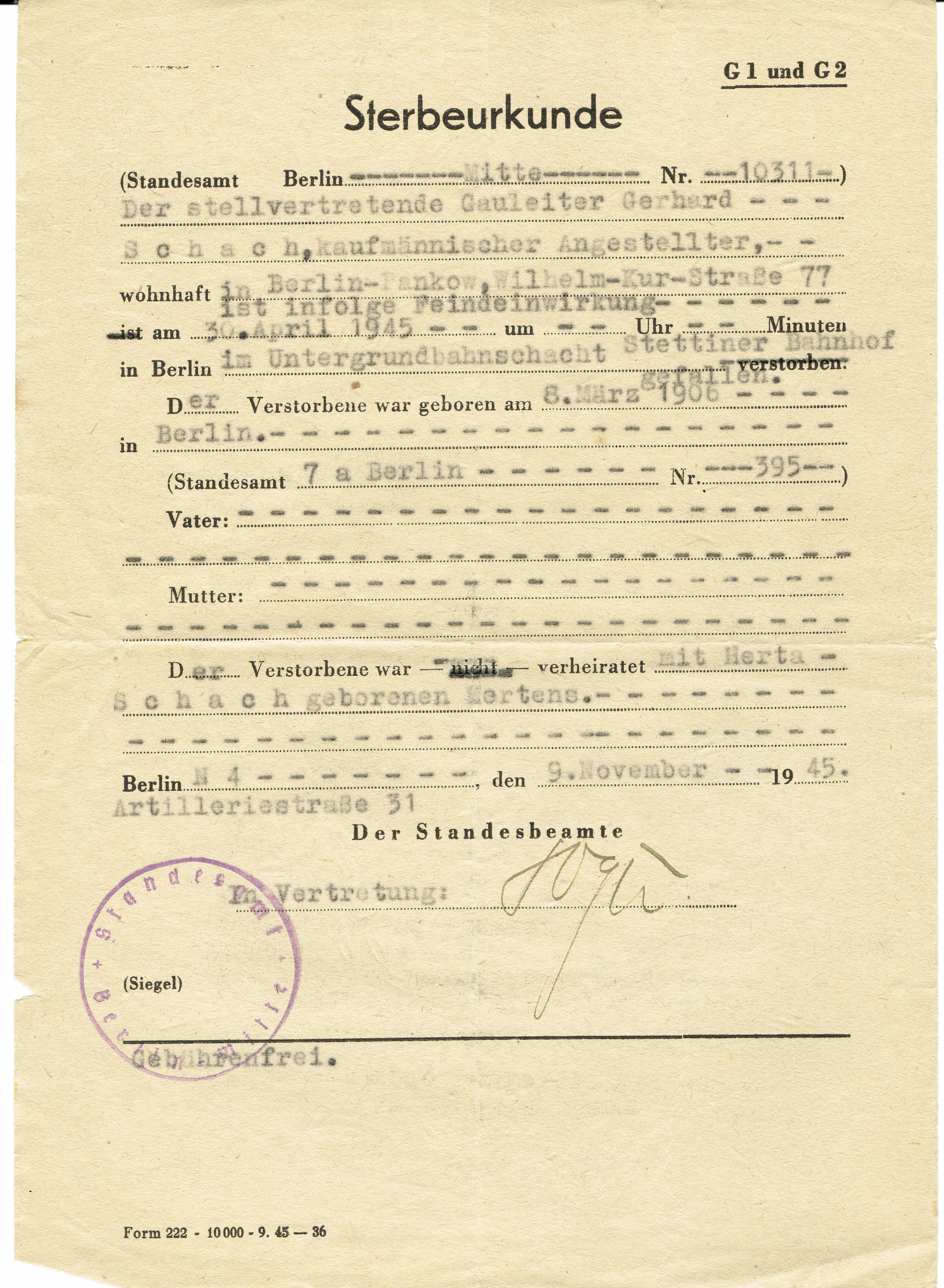
Copy of Schach's death certificate, dated 5 November 1945, indicating the date of death as 30 April 1945

In his position as Deputy Gauleiter of Gau Berlin, Schach was part of Hitler's inner circle in the underground Führerbunker during the final days of the Battle in Berlin in April 1945. Following Hitler's suicide on 30 April, Schach was among the second group of bunker occupants led by Werner Neumann who, on the night of 1 May, tried to break out of the Red Army encirclement of Berlin through the underground S-Bahn tunnels. On the morning of 2 May they were confronted by Red Army troops and instructed to surrender, at which time eyewitnesses reported that Schach "shot himself on the spot". According to his official death certificate issued on 5 November 1945, Schach died in the underground S-Bahn tunnel near the Stettiner Banhof station, though the date is given as 30 April 1945. An alternate report states, without providing any corroborating evidence, that Schach went into captivity, was released, lived in Lower Saxony and died in 1972.

== Sources ==
- Arnold, Dietmar; Janick, Reiner (2003). Sirenen und gepackte Koffer: Bunkeralltag in Berlin. Links Christoph Verlag. ISBN 978-3-861-53308-5.
- Eberle, Henrik; Uhl, Matthias, eds. (2006). The Hitler Book: The Secret Dossier Prepared for Stalin from the Interrogations of Hitler's Personal Aides. Public Affairs. p. 337. ISBN 978-1-586-48456-9.
- Kershaw, Ian (2001). Hitler: 1936-1945 Nemesis. W. W. Norton & Company. ISBN 978-0-393-32252-1.
- Longerich, Peter (2015). Goebbels: A Biography. Vintage. ISBN 978-0-099-52369-7.
- Stockhorst, Erich (1985). 5000 Köpfe: Wer War Was im 3. Reich. Arndt. ISBN 978-3-887-41116-9.
