= Paul Fritz Wiemann =

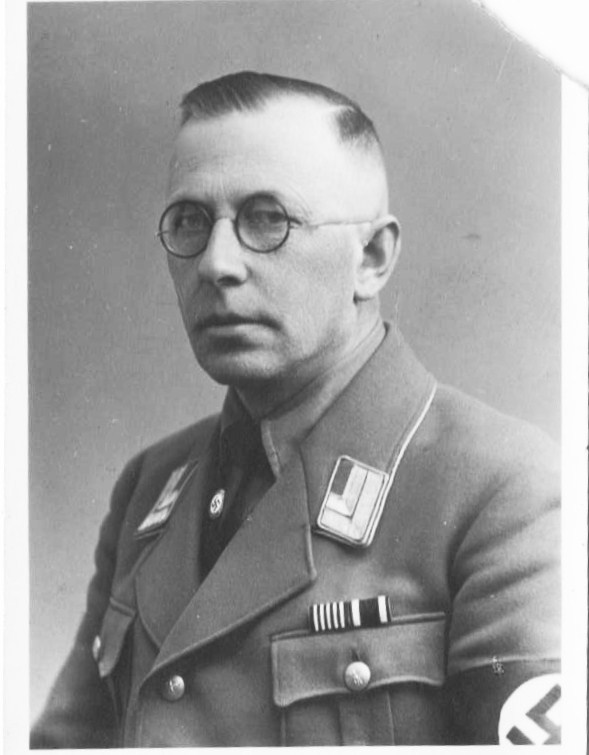
- Wiemann wearing uniform of Zellenleiter, 1935
- In office 1938–1945

Personal details
- Born: Paul Fritz Wiemann; 30 September 1888 Schwanenbeck, Pomerania, Prussia, German Empire
- Died: 20 September 1964 (aged 75) Klecken, Rosengarten, Lower Saxony
- Party: National Socialist German Workers' Party (NSDAP)
- Spouse: Katharina (Käthe) Ninow
- Children: Kurt, Gerda and Ilse
- Profession: Political officer, Rektor

Paul Fritz Wiemann, Rektor and NSDAP Ortsgruppenamtsleiter (30 September 1888 – 20 September 1964) was an official of the Nazi Party (NSDAP). He served as Amtsleiter and Propagandaleiter in the city of Eilenburg from 1938 to 1945.

== Early life ==
Wiemann was born in Schwanenneck (Suchanówko) in Pomerania on 30 September 1888, the son of Theodor Gustav Wiemann, a tradesman, and Luise Holzhüter.

Wiemann trained as a teacher in Pomerania, obtaining his first qualification in February 1910 in Dramburg (Drawsko Pomorskie) and his second in November 1912 in Köslin (Koszalin). He became a fully qualified teacher on 1 April 1914, undertaking his first teaching placement at Gutsbezirk Wulflatzke in Eastern Pomerania

Wiemann served in the Imperial German Army during World War I winning the Iron Cross, second class, and the Hanseatic Cross of Hamburg, both awarded for bravery.

After the war, he went back to teaching, first in Stettin, then in Hettstedt from October 1927 in a school for children with disabilities. While at Hettstedt, he passed a further teaching exam in March 1929 in Magdeburg. On the 1 April 1935, Wiemann moved to the city of Eilenburg to take up the position of Rektor (Headmaster) of the Volkschule called the "Ostschule", where he remained until April 1945.

In a seminal work on the history of education in Germany, Wiemann was used to exemplify the professional and political progression of the teaching profession in that nation in the 20th century – from the Empire, through the Weimar Republic, Nazi Germany and to the Federal Republic of Germany.

Wiemann married Katharina (Käthe) Ninow on 23 June 1914 and they had three children together – Kurt, Gerda and Ilse.

== Nazi Party ==
Wiemann joined the Nazi Party on 19 April 1933, with membership number 2774877. He became a member of the Sturmabteilung (SA) in Hettstedt (Gruppe Mitte) in the same year at the rank of Rottenführer (Section Leader); in 1934 he was promoted to Scharführer (Squad Leader). He left the SA in 1935 after a reorganisation; SA members 45 years and above (Wiemann was 47) were reassigned to local militias.

Wiemann began his career as an NSDAP political officer after he had moved to Eilenburg (Gau Halle-Merseburg) in March 1935. He arrived as the Rektor (Headmaster) of a school at which the Ortsgruppenleiter (Local Group Leader) in the Sorbenburg District, Weitze, was one of the teachers. Wiemann was initially appointed as a Zellenleiter (Cell Leader), usually the highest Nazi official that the general population would have direct dealings with on a day-to-day basis.

In 1938, Wiemann was promoted to the rank of Amtsleiter (Office Leader), second in command to the Ortsgruppenleiter. His main role was to act as the Propagandaleiter (Propaganda Leader) for the area. His duties included writing political placards, sending out Party communications to Zellenleiters in the district, and organising political events, including musical concerts. He sometimes acted as the Ortsgruppe's flagbearer. In 1939, with the reorganisation of NSDAP ranks, he became a Haupteinsatzleiter (Head Action Leader), though continued to use the Amtsleiter designation. In 1943, Wiemann received the Nazi Party Long Service Award in bronze and the Golden Party Badge (Golden Honor Award) for meritorious service to the Party, as well as the Social Welfare Decoration for improving the welfare of the civilian population.

Wiemann was also a member of a number of other NSDAP organisations. He joined the Nationalsozialistische Lehrerbund, NSLB (National Socialist Teachers League) on 1 April 1933 with membership number 32408. He rose to become its section treasurer from 1938 until 1941. He was also in the Reichsluftschutzbund (State Air Protection Corps) from 1933 until 1945 and the Nationalsozialistische Volkswohlfahrt (National Socialist People's Welfare) from 1934 until 1945.

== Capture and imprisonment ==
During the waning months of World War II, Eilenburg was attacked by the 69th infantry division of the US Army, Commanded by Major general. Emil F. Reinhardt.

On the morning of 17 April 1945 the sirens sounded and a German commander of Eilenburg declared the city a stronghold, which meant that it had to be defended to the last man. The command read: "Die Muldelinie muss verteidigt werden!" (The Mulde border must be defended!) In response, hundreds of the town's citizens gathered in the marketplace the next morning and demanded that the order be rescinded; but their pleas were ignored; Wiemann was also against resisting the Americans, but the "Ostschule" at that time was the seat of "Kampfgruppe Eilenburg" (Eilenburg Battle Group) and Wiemann was subordinate to the Ortsgruppenleiter and the military commander. The bridges were blown up, and a US ultimatum went unheeded. The battle for the city lasted nine days; Eilenburg was shelled extensively for three days and three nights; in the end all that was left was a smoking pile of rubble. The defence of the city cost over two hundred lives, including a number of Hitler Youth members. More than 90% of Eilenburg's historic centre buildings were destroyed.

The city was finally captured by US Forces on 23 April 1945. Wiemann, along with other NSDAP political officers, were rounded up by the US soldiers. He was then transported westward to the Civilian Internment Camp 91 at Darmstadt in Hessen. The camp was located on the Kavalleriesand, occupying the grounds of the heavily damaged Reiter barracks. Surrounded by barbed wire and guard towers, about 25,000 internees from all areas of Nazism were detained in the camp including local party leaders, police officers, members of the Gestapo, SA or SS. One of the most famous prisoners was Obersturmbannführer Otto Skorzeny. The camp was massive in scale and had its own elected local government camp police, and its own camp newspaper entitled "The mountain road". The prisoners were employed: there was a sports programme, utilities and workshops, a theatre and even a university for the internees. A short video showing Wiemann learning English exists.

In the camp, the prisoners were awaiting denazification or criminal trial. Wiemann was unconditionally released from the camp on 15 April 1946.

== Denazification ==
On leaving the camp, Wiemann moved to Büdingen where he underwent the denazification process carried out by the local Spruchkammer (German civilian court handling denazification).

After the liberation of Germany in May 1945, the Allied Powers initiated a comprehensive denazification programme. Its purpose was to eradicate Nazism from political, economic as well as intellectual and cultural life. The main focus of the program was the systematic screening of all former members of the NSDAP – party membership was defined as the criterion for their dismissal from public office. All Germans subjected to denazification had to fill out a lengthy questionnaire. In this way their personal responsibility or blame for the crimes of the Nazi era were to be established. A law enacted by the US military government classified these people into five categories: I. Major offenders, II. Offenders, III. Lesser offenders, IV. Followers, V. Exonerated persons.

Wiemann was initially designated as an "Offender" (Activist) in view of his membership of the SA and official capacity in the NSDAP. For that reason he was forbidden to work except as a manual labourer; he also had to regularly report to the police while the denazification process was in progress.

Wiemann worked as a woodsman from May 1946 until July 1946, but had to give this up as he developed rheumatic fever. He then obtained a job with his cousin who owned a dairy in Büdingen.

As part of their investigation, the Court dealing with Wiemann's case wrote to the municipal authorities in Eilenburg, then located in the Soviet occupation zone, asking them for information on Wiemann's conduct whilst in the NSDAP. On 7 May 1948, the Court received testimony from Emma Fähmel; she had been a cleaner at the "Ostschule" and had never been in the Nazi Party. She stated that Wiemann had protected her from attack from Nazi party members, the NS-Frauenschaft (National Socialist Women's League) and the Hitler Youth. She also related that Wiemann had banned the Hitler Youth from using the school for its meetings due to its loutish behaviour. Another testimony, dated 10 May 1948, was from a former teacher at his school, Marie Helene Espe, again a non-Party member. She also gave a favourable account, stating that Wiemann had put his responsibility to the school before that of the Nazi party. She had also witnessed two separate incidents where parents with anti-Nazi beliefs had been brought to Wiemann's attention, but he had not taken any further action. Another individual from the school testified that they had no knowledge of Wiemann doing anything harmful against any person.

Furthermore, the municipal authorities in Eilenburg wrote to the Court that they did not have any evidence against Wiemann and suggested that he could return to the city at the conclusion of the court proceedings.

Similar enquiries by the Court to the municipal authorities in Hettstedt, where Wiemann had been in the SA, revealed nothing of interest.

As a result of all the information that it received, the Court re-classified Wiemann as a "Follower" rather than as an "Offender". He was fined the sum of 6500 RM and discharged on 19 July 1948, a free man. By 1949 more than 6 million Germans had been scrutinized in this way. The denazification authorities passed judgment in some 1.2 million cases – more than a million persons were classified as followers. This figure compared with just under 2000 major offenders and some 25,000 offenders.

== Later life ==
Wiemann went back to the teaching profession, obtaining a job at a school for children with disabilities in Büdingen. His wife, Käthe, joined him after escaping from the Soviet Zone, along with her daughter Gerda, and grandson. After retiring in 1953 at the age of 65 years, he moved with his wife to the village of Klecken in Rosengarten, where his son was living. Käthe died on 23 October 1962 of cancer; Wiemann died on 20 September 1964 at the age of 75 years from a heart attack.

== Summary of his NSDAP career ==
=== Dates of rank ===
- SA-Rottenführer - 1933
- SA-Scharführer - 1934
- Zellenleiter - 1935
- Amtsleiter - 1938
- Haupteinsatzleiter - 1939

=== Notable decorations ===
- Honour Cross of the World War 1914/1918
- Iron Cross of 1914, 2nd class
- Hanseatic Cross of Hamburg
- SA Sports Badge, in gold
- Civil Service Faithful Service Medal, in silver
- Nazi Party Long Service Award, in Bronze
- Golden Party Badge (Golden Honor Award)
- Social Welfare Decoration, third class
- Luftschutz Decoration, 2nd class
