= Gemeinschaftsleiter =

Political rank of the Nazi Party

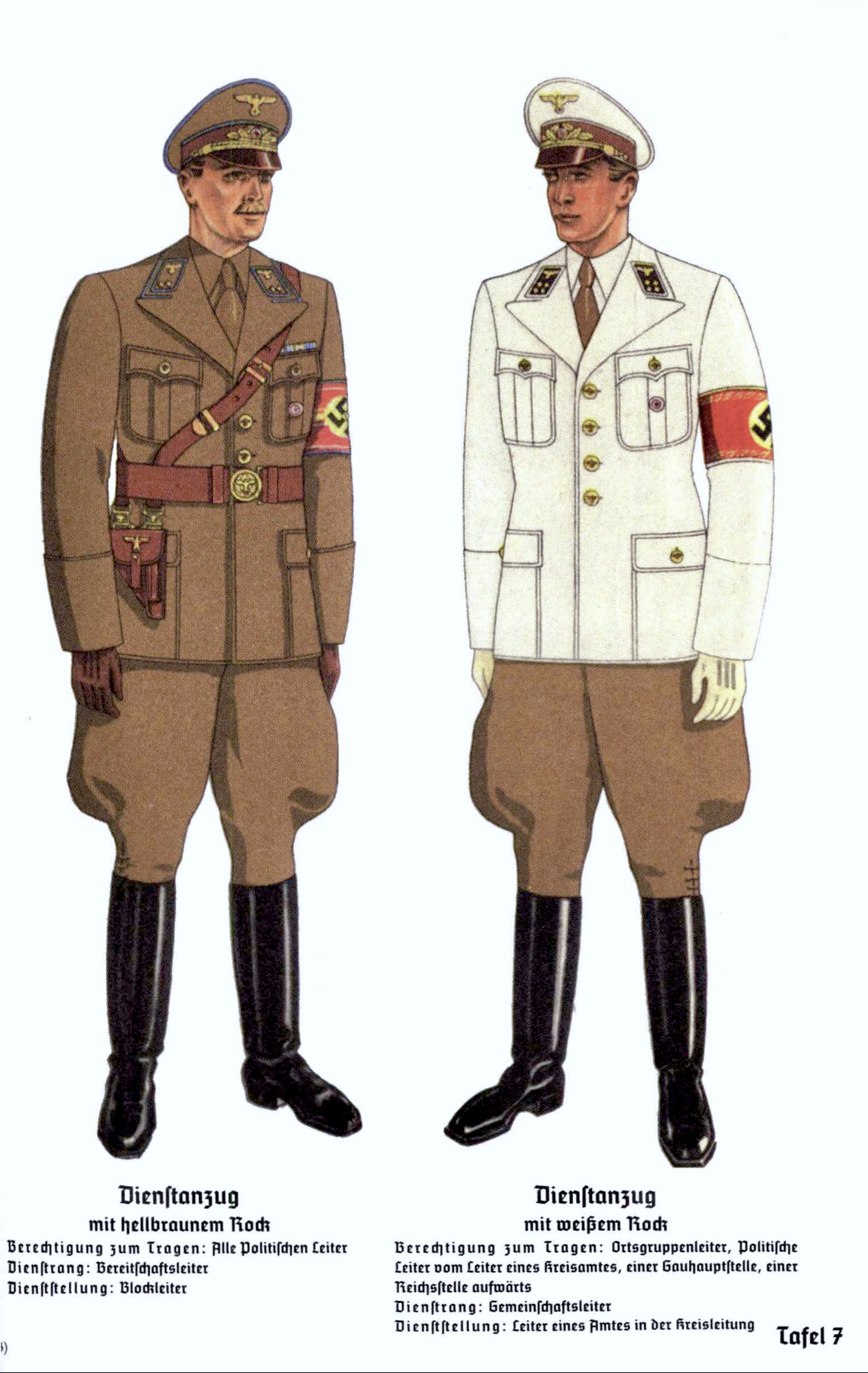
Uniform of a Gemeinschaftsleiter, 1940 (right)

Gemeinschaftsleiter (Community Leader) was a Nazi Party political rank which existed between 1939 and 1945. Created primary to replace the older rank of Stützpunktleiter, the rank of Gemeinschaftsleiter was often used on the local level of the Nazi Party to denote the second in command of a municipal region, answering to a regional Nazi known by the title of Ortsgruppenleiter.

On higher levels of the Nazi Party (County, Regional, and National), the rank of Gemeinschaftsleiter was a mid-level staff position, roughly equivalent to a Captain.

There were three levels of the rank: Gemeinschaftsleiter, Obergemeinschaftsleiter, and Hauptgemeinschaftsleiter. The insignia made use of four pips with horizontal bars to denote the two higher positions. The rank was subordinate to that of Abschnittsleiter.

== Insignia ==
Gorget patch for Gemeinschaftsleiter

Gorget patch for Obergemeinschaftsleiter

Gorget patch for Hauptgemeinschaftsleiter
