= Artur Görlitzer =

German Nazi politician (1893–1945)

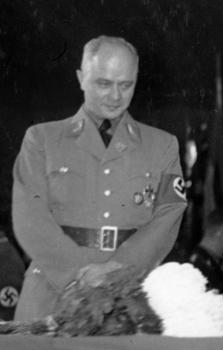
- Artur Görlitzer (1936)

Deputy Gauleiter, Gau Berlin
- In office March 13, 1933 – December 1943
- Preceded by: Hans Meinschausen
- Succeeded by: Gerhard Schach

Additional positions
- 1933–1945: Prussian State Councilor
- 1933–1945: Reichstag Deputy
- 1932–1933: Landtag of Prussia Deputy

Personal details
- Born: June 22, 1893 Frankfurt (Oder), Kingdom of Prussia, German Empire
- Died: April 25, 1945 (age 51) Berlin, Free State of Prussia, Nazi Germany
- Cause of death: Suicide
- Party: Nazi Party
- Profession: Civil servant

Military service
- Allegiance: German Empire
- Branch/service: Imperial German Army
- Years of service: 1914–1918
- Rank: Leutnant
- Battles/wars: World War I
- Awards: Iron Cross, 1st and 2nd class

Artur Görlitzer, sometimes Anglicized as Arthur Goerlitzer, (June 22, 1893 – April 25, 1945) was a Nazi Party official who served as the Deputy Gauleiter of Gau Berlin from 1933 to 1943. He was also a member of the German Reichstag and an SA-Gruppenführer. He committed suicide, together with his wife, at the close of the Second World War in Europe.

== Early life ==
Artur Görlitzer was born to a railway official in Frankfurt (Oder). Between 1899 and 1910 he first attended the seminar school in Neuzelle, then Volksschule and Realschule in Berlin. Until 1914 he worked as a municipal civil servant in the town of Lankwitz, which was later incorporated into Berlin under the Greater Berlin Act of 1920. At the outbreak of World War I, he volunteered for service in the Imperial German Army. He served on both the eastern front and the western front and participated in the Battle of the Somme. Wounded three times during the war, he received the Iron Cross 1st and 2nd class. In January 1917 he was promoted to Leutnant of reserves, and he became a French prisoner of war in May. Following the end of the war, he returned to Germany in 1920. In civilian life Görlitzer continued his career as a civil servant, first again in Lankwitz, and in 1921 at the Berlin city administration. From September 1922 he was an official of the Reich Finance Administration, working first at the tax office in Steglitz, then at the Berlin state tax office, and lastly as senior tax secretary and chairman of the civil servants committee of the tax office in Friedrichstadt.

== Nazi Party career ascendency ==
Görlitzer joined the Nazi Party on July 1, 1928 (membership number 92,505). According to his own statements, "In order to balance the attitude of the French and the English, every German must be radically national", and that "the solution of the Jewish question is the decisive problem of life for the German people".

Working his way up the Party bureaucracy in Berlin between 1928 and 1933, Görlitzer advanced from Zellenleiter (Cell Leader) to Local Group Clerk to Ortsgruppenleiter (Local Group Leader) and finally to Bezirksleiter (District Leader). Because of his political activity he was relieved of office in the Reich Finance Administration in 1930; a disciplinary procedure initiated in November 1931 was discontinued in August 1932. He went into politics and was elected as a Nazi deputy to the Landtag of Prussia on April 24, 1932, serving until its dissolution on October 14, 1933.

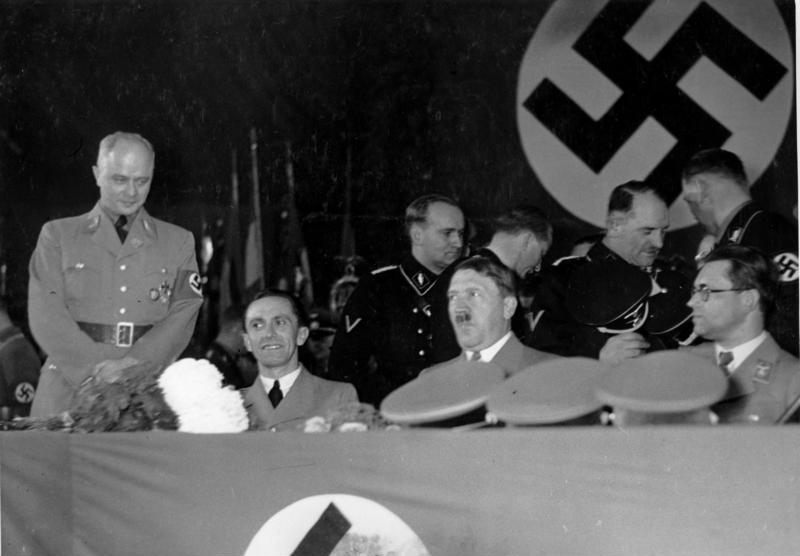
In the forefront, L-R: Artur Görlitzer (standing), Joseph Goebbels, Adolf Hitler, and Philipp Bouhler (1936)

After the Nazi seizure of power, Görlitzer was appointed Deputy Gauleiter of Gau Berlin on March 13, 1933, where he served under Gauleiter Joseph Goebbels. On July 11, 1933, Görlitzer was named to the recently reconstituted Prussian State Council by Prussian Minister President Hermann Göring. At the November 1933 German parliamentary election, he was elected to the Reichstag from electoral constituency 2 (Berlin). He would be reelected in 1936 and 1938 for constituency 3 (Berlin-East), serving until the end of the Nazi regime. On July 20, 1934, he also became a Berlin City Councillor. A member of the Nazi paramilitary organization, the Sturmabteilung (SA), Görlitzer attained the rank of SA-Gruppenführer on November 9, 1938. From 1941, he was the director and manager of the Deutschlandhalle and a supervisory board member of the Deutsche Revisions und Treuhand AG auditing office.

== Removal from office and death ==
By 1943, Görlitzer had been Goebbels' deputy for ten years. However, the Berlin Gauleiter was growing more critical of his deputy and suspected Görlitzer of harboring ambitions to replace him as Gauleiter. In his diary entry of March 26, 1942, Goebbels stated that he wanted to "marginalize Görlitzer more and more". As early as January 6, 1940, Goebbels confided to his diary: "He's so opinionated and has false, repressed ambitions." By December 1943, Goebbels succeeded in removing Görlitzer as Deputy Gauleiter. He was assigned to the East Ministry under Reichsminister Alfred Rosenberg and was briefly appointed in the spring of 1944 as General Commissioner of the General District Shitomir in the Reichskommissariat Ukraine. However, this appointment had no practical significance, as by that time the area had already been reconquered by the Red Army.

Artur Görlitzer and his wife Paula, with Berlin already surrounded by the Red Army, committed suicide there on April 25, 1945. Their son Bruno had fallen at the beginning of 1943 at Stalingrad. Their daughter Anita emigrated to the US after the war.

== Literature ==
- Das Deutsche Führerlexikon 1934-1935. Berlin: Verlagsanftalt Otto Stollberg G. m. b. H. 1934.
- Klee, Ernst (2007). Das Personenlexikon zum Dritten Reich. Wer war was vor und nach 1945. Frankfurt-am-Main: Fischer-Taschenbuch-Verlag. ISBN 978-3-596-16048-8.
- Joachim Lilla (Editor): Extras in uniform. The members of the Reichstag 1933–1945. Düsseldorf, Droste publishing house, 2004. ISBN 3-7700-5254-4.
- Lilla, Joachim (2005). Der Preußische Staatsrat 1921–1933: Ein biographisches Handbuch. Düsseldorf: Droste Verlag. ISBN 978-3-770-05271-4.
- Longerich, Peter (2015). Goebbels: A Biography. Vintage. ISBN 978-0-099-52369-7.
- Miller, Michael D.; Schulz, Andreas (2012). Gauleiter: The Regional Leaders of the Nazi Party and Their Deputies, 1925–1945. Vol. 1 (Herbert Albrecht - H. Wilhelm Hüttmann). R. James Bender Publishing. ISBN 978-1-932-97021-0.
