= Befehlsleiter =

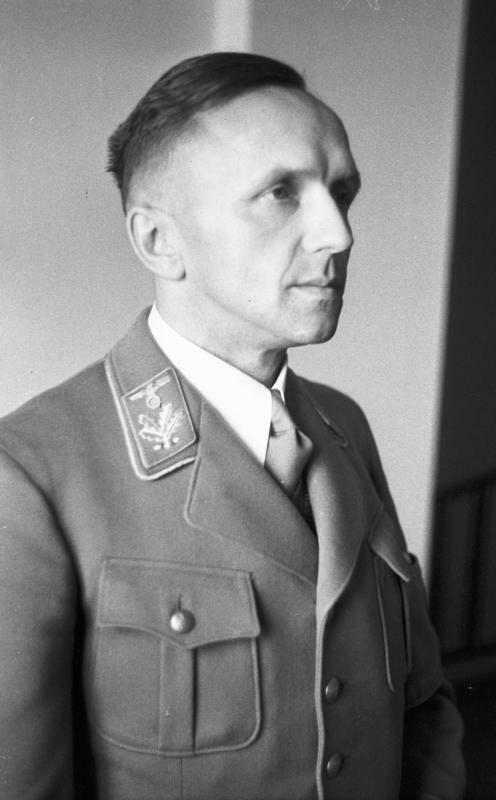
Gerhard Klopfer, with the Nazi rank of Befehlsleiter (Command Leader) in 1942

Befehlsleiter (Command Leader) was a Nazi Party political rank of Nazi Germany.

== Ranks ==
A Befehlsleiter was the highest possible party political rank achievable in the Nazi Party (NSDAP). Only Gauleiter (party official) and Reichsleiter (state appointment) were higher, but these titles were not within the Nazi Party's regular promotional pathway because these positions were only by direct appointment from Adolf Hitler. Until 1939, Kreisleiter and Ortsgruppenleiter, were the fourth and fifth tier of the Nazi Party hierarchy, but they had become titular positions at the outbreak of the Second World War.

Albert Speer, the Reich Ministry of Armaments and War Production, was promoted to Befehlsleiter in 1942 and Oberbefehlsleiter in 1944.

=== Tiers ===
1. Hauptbefehlsleiter - Head Command Leader
2. Oberbefehlsleiter - Higher Command Leader
3. Befehlsleiter - Command Leader

== Sources ==
- Clark, J. (2007). Uniforms of the NSDAP. Atglen, PA: Schiffer Publishing
