= Wiemann =

Wiemann is a surname. Notable people with the surname include:

- Ernst Wiemann (1919–1980), German operatic bass
- John Wiemann, American politician
- Michael Wiemann (born 1987), German former footballer
- Paul Fritz Wiemann (1888–1964), German Nazi Party official
