= Schmeer =

Schmeer is a surname. Notable people with the surname include:

- Karen Schmeer (1970–2010), German film editor
- Rudolf Schmeer (1905–1966), German Nazi Party politician
