= Helfer =

Paramilitary rank of Nazi Party (1938 - 1945)

Helfer Helper
- Country: Nazi Germany
- Service branch: German Red Cross; Nazi Party
- Rank: Paramilitary rank
- Formation: 1938
- Abolished: 1945
- Next lower rank: Anwärter

Helfer ([ˈhɛlfɐ], transl. Helper) was a paramilitary rank of the Nazi Party between the years of 1938 and 1945. The Nazi rank of Helfer was a junior position of the Political Leadership Corps, ranking only above Anwärter. A Helfer in the Nazi Party typically served as a junior assistant to a higher official. The rank was created at first to replace the older Nazi rank of Blockleiter; however, a massive expansion of Nazi Party ranks in 1938 assigned the old duties of a Blockleiter to a rank known as Arbeitsleiter. The rank of Helfer then became an assistant position to such higher ranks.

The insignia for a Helfer consisted of a brown collar patch with an eagle and swastika, and one or two stripes on the lower portion of the collar tab. A single stripe denoted the rank of Helfer while two stripes denoted the higher position of Oberhelfer. The rank of Helfer was also common in Nazi student groups, typically held by the leader of a local student cell who answered to a local Nazi Party leader. In the film “Die Weiße Rose”, a character known as “Studentenführer”, holds the rank of Helfer. The Nazi rank of Helfer ceased to exist in 1945.

== Insignia ==
Rank group
German Red Cross
German Red Cross	DRK-Haupthelfer (mit Zugführer Prüfung)	DRK-Haupthelfer	DRK-Oberhelfer	DRK-Vorhelfer (mit Gruppenführer Prüfung)	DRK-Vorhelfer	DRK-Helfer
Nazi Party
Nazi Party			Oberhelfer			Helfer
