= Stellenleiter =

Nazi party rank

Stellenleiter Department leader
- National level collar tab
- Country: Nazi Germany
- Service branch: Nazi Party
- Rank: Political rank
- Formation: 1936
- Abolished: 1939
- Next higher rank: Amtsleiter
- Next lower rank: Mitarbeiter

Stellenleiter ([ˈʃtɛlənˌlaɪ̯.tɐ], transl. Department leader) was a Nazi Party political rank which existed between 1936 and 1939. The rank was created as a mid-level political position intended to replace the older rank of Zellenwart ("cell guard"), also known as Zellenleiter. In the early Nazi Party rank organization, the position of stellenleiter was senior to Mitarbeiter and junior to Amtsleiter.

The rank of stellenleiter was phased out of the Nazi Party in 1939, replaced by a new series of para-military political ranks.

== Responsibilities ==
On the county and town level of the Nazi Party, the stellenleiter typically served in the positional role of Zellenleiter and was often referred to as such in contrast to their actual political rank. On higher levels of the Nazi party (County, Region, and National level), stellenleiter was an administrative staff officer type position.

== Insignia ==
Rank group	Hauptstellenleiter	Stellenleiter	Hilfsstellenleiter
Reichsleitung
Gauleitung			None
Kreisleitung			None
Ortsleitung			None
