= Arbeitsleiter (NSDAP) =

Political rank in the Nazi Party

Arbeitsleiter, German for work leader, was also a Nazi Party political rank which existed between 1939 and 1945. The rank was created to replace the former rank of mitarbeiter and was divided into three levels of arbeitsleiter, oberarbeitsleiter, and hauptarbeitsleiter.

The rank of arbeitsleiter encompassed a wide variety of duties and was employed mainly as a junior staff position across all levels of the party (local, county, state, and national). The rank was senior to the position of helfer.

== Insignia ==
Gorget patch for Arbeitsleiter

Gorget patch for Oberarbeitsleiter

Gorget patch for Hauptarbeitsleiter

== Sources ==
- Clark, J. (2007). Uniforms of the NSDAP. Atglen, PA: Schiffer Publishing
