= Gerhard Klopfer =

German Nazi Party official (1905–1987)

- Klopfer in his Befehlsleiter uniform November 1942

State Secretary of the Party Chancellery
- In office 22 November 1942 – 8 May 1945
- Supervisor: Martin Bormann
- Preceded by: Position created
- Succeeded by: Position abolished

Ministerial Director Party Chancellery
- In office 12 May 1941 – 22 November 1942

Senior Government Councilor of the Deputy Führer
- In office 18 April 1935 – 12 May 1941

Personal details
- Born: 18 February 1905 Schreibersdorf, Province of Silesia, Kingdom of Prussia, German Empire
- Died: 29 January 1987 (aged 81) Ulm, Baden-Württemberg, West Germany
- Party: Nazi Party
- Education: University of Breslau; University of Jena
- Occupation: Lawyer
- Known for: Wannsee Conference participant
- Awards: Golden Party Badge

Military service
- Allegiance: Nazi Germany
- Branch/service: Schutzstaffel
- Years of service: 1935–1945
- Rank: SS-Gruppenführer
- Unit: SD Main Office; Reich Security Main Office

Gerhard Klopfer (18 February 1905 – 29 January 1987) was a lawyer and a senior official in the Nazi Party who, as the State Secretary in the Party Chancellery, was Martin Bormann's chief deputy. He was also an SS-Gruppenführer. He participated in the Wannsee Conference that drew up plans for the implementation of the Final Solution to the Jewish Question. He subsequently denied all knowledge of the Holocaust and was never prosecuted.

== Early life and education ==
Klopfer was born the son of a farmer at Schreibersdorf (today, Pisarzowice) in the Prussian Province of Silesia. He attended the local Gymnasium and received his Abitur in 1923. He studied law and economics at the University of Breslau (today, the University of Wrocław) and the University of Jena. After passing his first state legal examination in 1927, he wrote his doctoral dissertation in 1929, received his doctorate of law degree and completed his legal clerkship in Breslau. In 1931, he passed his second state legal examination in Berlin and started working as a junior judge at Düsseldorf.

== Career in Nazi Germany ==
=== Government and Party posts ===
When the Nazis came to power in 1933, he joined the Nazi Party on 1 April (membership number 1,706,842) and the Party's paramilitary unit, the Sturmabteilung (SA), shortly afterward. On 1 November 1933, he was named as a state prosecutor in Düsseldorf and, on 1 December, he became a Referent (consultant) in the Prussian Ministry of Agriculture, Land and Forests under Walther Darré. He was promoted to Regierungsrat (Government Councilor) in August 1934 and, in December, he joined the Gestapo (Secret State Police). He also became a member of Hans Frank's Academy for German Law and served on its Police Law Committee. On 18 April 1935, he joined the staff of Deputy Führer Rudolf Hess at the Party headquarters in Munich. As an Oberregierungsrat (Senior Government Councilor), he initially headed the Party component overseeing the Reich Interior Ministry. In 1938, he became responsible for the seizing of Jewish businesses in the Aryanization process, for questions about mixed marriages between Gentile and Jewish Germans, and for general questions about occupation of foreign states. By April 1941, he had advanced to the rank of Ministerialdirektor and headed Department III that oversaw coordination between the Party and all state components. His field of responsibility included coordinating work with all the ministries and finalizing legislation. He became a close confidant of Martin Bormann who, on 12 May 1941, became head of the Party Chancellery, the successor organization to Hess' office.

Along with Helmuth Friedrichs, Klopfer was the highest-ranking official under Bormann. This position gave him extensive power of patronage within the Nazi Party, as Bormann often left appointments to party positions to Klopfer and Friedrichs. Klopfer represented Bormann at the Wannsee Conference on 20 January 1942, in which the details of the Final Solution of the Jewish Question were formalised, policies that culminated in the Holocaust. On 22 November 1942, Adolf Hitler appointed him to the position of State Secretary of the Party Chancellery. Klopfer was also responsible as signatory for a final call to arms, including the under-aged and the elderly from 16 to 60 years of age, to serve in the Volkssturm, the Nazi Party militia, during the final months of the Second World War.

=== SS membership ===
In addition to his Party positions, Klopfer was also a member of the Schutzstaffel (SS). He joined the organization in July 1935 (SS number 272,227) where he first was assigned to the SD Main Office and would later join the Reich Security Main Office. Commissioned as an officer on 15 September 1935, he rose rapidly through the ranks and attained his final promotion to SS-Gruppenführer on 9 November 1944.

SS ranks
Date	Rank
15 September 1935	SS-Untersturmführer
9 November 1935	SS-Obersturmführer
20 April 1936	SS-Hauptsturmführer
20 January 1937	SS-Sturmbannführer
20 January 1939	SS-Obersturmbannführer
20 April 1939	SS-Standartenführer
20 April 1941	SS-Oberführer
30 January 1942	SS-Brigadeführer
9 November 1944	SS-Gruppenführer

== Post-war life ==
As the Red Army closed in on Berlin in April 1945, Klopfer fled west from the city. He went into hiding under an assumed name but, on March 1, 1946, he was discovered, arrested and interned in Munich by the Counterintelligence Corps. He testified as a witness at the Ministries Trial in Nuremberg in 1948. He was charged with war crimes but denied all knowledge of the Holocaust. The case against him was dropped for lack of evidence and because it was deemed he did not have enough power to have influenced the Nazi policy on the Holocaust.

After his release, Klopfer underwent a denazification process by a German tribunal in March 1949 and was classified as a "minor offender" (category III), receiving a 2000 Reichsmark fine and three years probation. He found work as a carpenter until becoming a tax advisor in the city of Ulm in 1952 and was readmitted to the practice of law in 1956. Another investigation into Klopfer's participation in the Wannsee Conference that was initiated by the Ulm public prosecutor's office in September 1960 was closed on 29 January 1962 on the basis that "there was no way the accused could have prevented or obstructed the implementation of the mass murder program". When he died in 1987, Klopfer was the last surviving attendee of the Wannsee Conference. When he died, his family published a death notice that celebrated "a fulfilled life that was to the benefit of all those who came under his sphere of influence". This caused a public outcry and was denounced by many as an insult to all victims of the Nazi regime.

== Fictional portrayals ==
Klopfer was portrayed by Günter Spörrle in the German film Die Wannseekonferenz (1984), by Ian McNeice in the BBC/HBO film Conspiracy (2001) and by Fabian Busch in the German film Die Wannseekonferenz (2022).
