= Blockleiter =

Political officer in Nazi Germany

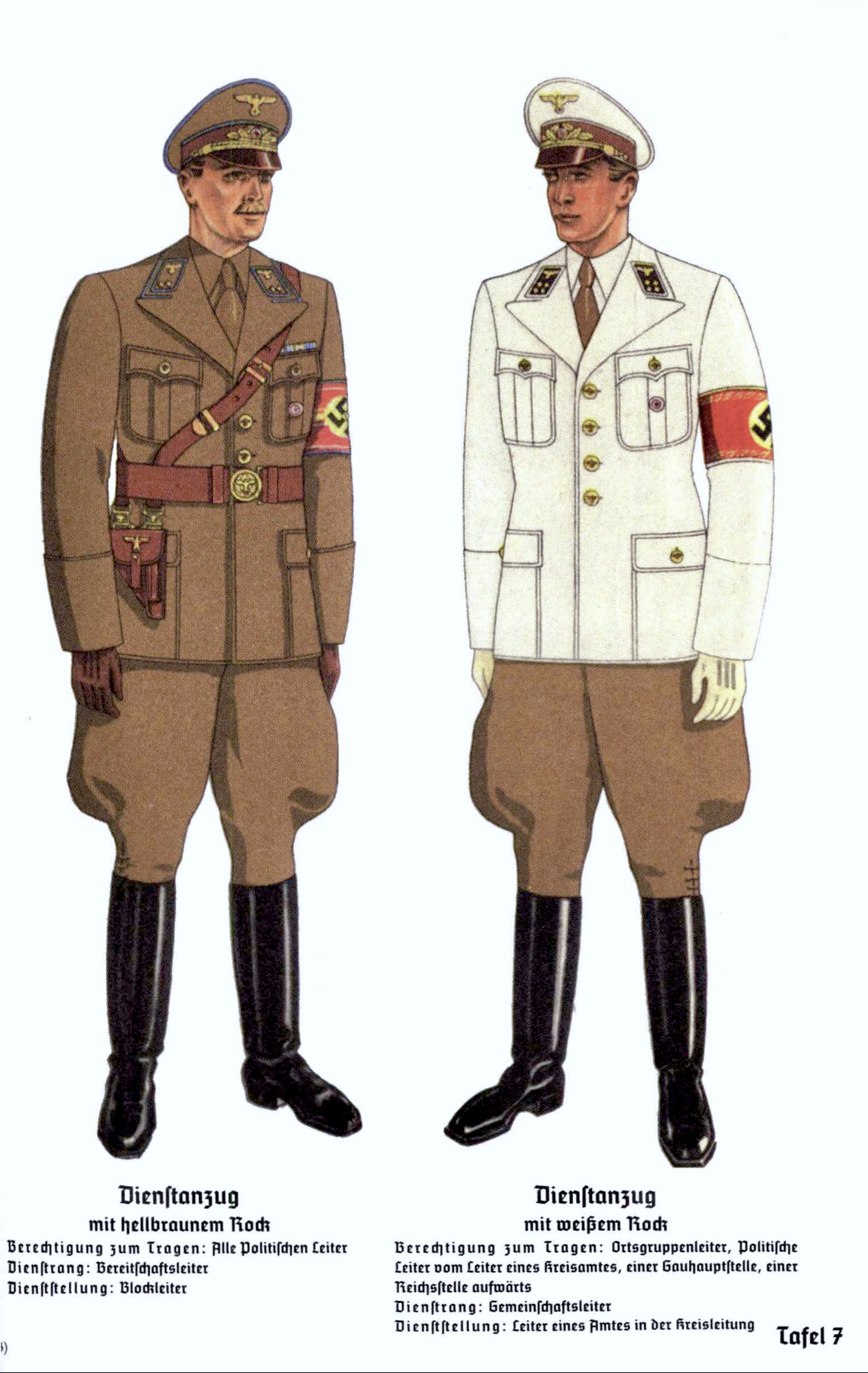
Blockleiter uniform (left)

Blockleiter armband

Blockleiter (Block Leader), where block refers to city block, was from 1933 the title of a lower Nazi Party political rank responsible for the political supervision of a neighborhood. Referred to in common parlance as Blockwart (Block Warden), the Block Warden's duty was to form the primary link between the Nazi authorities and the general population. The derogatory term Blockwart ("snoop") survives in German colloquial language.

== History and usage ==
The title of Blockleiter was first created in 1930 and was initially known as Blockwart. The purpose of the Block Warden was to organize local support for elections during a period when Nazis were attempting to gain both local and national political offices in the Weimar Republic. Block Wardens were organized by neighborhoods in German towns and cities, and answered to a "Cell Warden" known as the Zellenwart. Typically, there were eight to ten blocks in one cell.

In 1933, when the Nazis came to power, the old political rank of Blockwart was phased out of the Nazi rank system to be replaced by a new rank known as Mitarbeiter. It is at this point that the term Blockleiter was most often used, although not as an actual political rank but as a title for a Mitarbeiter assigned to the local level of the Nazi Party in charge of a neighborhood or a street.

Those Mitarbeiter assigned as Block Wardens now answered to an official known as a Zellenleiter (Cell Warden). The Cell Warden title, not an actual rank, was assigned to Nazis holding the political rank of Stellenleiter.

In 1939, with the establishment of a new array of Nazi Party political ranks, both Mitarbeiter and Blockleiter became political positions, denoted by special armbands. The organization of the Nazi Block unit now encompassed several positions; the complete array of Block titles was as follows:

- Blockhelfer – Block Assistant
- Blockleiter – Block Warden
- Blockwalter – Block Administrator
- Blockobmann – Block Foreman

A special operational position known as Betriebsblockobmann also existed; its role was to control the political attitudes and behaviour of managers and workers in war time production.

== Duties ==
Whereas the old Blockwart position had been concerned with election district leadership, the new Block Warden (Blockleiter) was concerned with enforcing Nazi doctrine and supervising the local population. After 1933, the Block Warden was in charge of spreading propaganda and developing an acceptance to the policies of the NSDAP among the households (typically 40 to 60) in his area.

It was also the duty of the Block Warden to spy on the population and report any anti-Nazi activities to the local Gestapo office; thus the Block Warden was the prime element of the Nazi totalitarian state. This was helped by keeping files on each household (Haushaltskarten). Due to such activities, Block Wardens were particularly disliked by the general population. Other duties included allocating beds in homes for visiting NSDAP demonstrators, the collection of subscriptions and charitable donations especially for Winterhilfe (Winter Relief Campaigns) and organising the clearing of rubble after air-raids.

By the close of World War II, it is thought that there were nearly half a million Block Wardens.

== Sources ==
- Clark, J. (2007). Uniforms of the NSDAP. Atglen, PA: Schiffer Publishing
