= Sonderbeauftragter =

Political position in the Nazi Party

Sonderbeauftragter (Special Representative) was a Nazi Party political position which existed between the years of 1939 and 1945. The position of Sonderbeauftragter did not exist on the local level of the Nazi Party (the Ortsgruppen) but was standard across County, Regional, and National Party lines.

Holders of the position would also hold a Nazi political rank and would wear a bare swastika political armband to denote their position as a Sonderbeauftragter.

== Sources ==
- Clark, J. (2007). Uniforms of the NSDAP. Atglen, PA: Schiffer Publishing
