= Rudolf Schmeer =

Nazi Party politician and civil servant

Deputy Leader German Labor Front
- In office 10 May 1933 – 4 February 1938
- Leader: Robert Ley

Ministerial Director Reich and Prussian Ministry of Economics
- In office 4 February 1938 – 24 April 1942
- Minister: Walther Funk

Plenipotentiary (later, Leader) Central Reporting Office Reich Ministry of Armaments and War Production
- In office 24 April 1942 – 8 May 1945
- Minister: Albert Speer

Additional positions
- 1930–1945: Member of the Reichstag
- 1935–1945: Member of the Prussian State Council

Personal details
- Born: 16 March 1905 Saarbrücken, Rhine Province, Kingdom of Prussia, German Empire
- Died: 11 September 1966 (aged 61) Erlangen, Bavaria, West Germany
- Party: Nazi Party
- Occupation: Electrical engineer

Rudolf Jakob Schmeer (16 March 1905 – 11 September 1966) was a German Nazi Party politician. He held a number of Party and government positions during the Third Reich, and worked very closely with high ranking Nazis such as Robert Ley, Hermann Göring, Walther Funk and Albert Speer.

== Early life ==
Schmeer was born in Saarbrücken and, after attending Volksschule, trained as an electrical engineer from 1919 to 1923 and passed his state master craftsman licensing examination. At the end of 1922, Schmeer joined the Nazi Party. Due to his participation in acts of sabotage against Belgian forces occupying the Rhineland in the Aachen area, Schmeer was sentenced by a Belgian court-martial to fifteen years of forced labor on 29 December 1923. Under the terms of an amnesty, the sentence was lifted in 1924.

== Nazi Party career ==
Schmeer rejoined the Party in September 1925 (membership number 18,491), after it was refounded following its outlawing in the wake of the failed Beer Hall Putsch. In that year he also joined the Sturmabteilung (SA), the Party's paramilitary organization. From August 1926 to 1931, he served as Party Bezirksleiter in the Aachen administrative district, which he had helped to establish. In 1926, Schmeer also began to engage in propaganda activities, making speeches as a Reichsreder (national speaker). In October 1929, he was dismissed from his employment because of his political activity. In the 1930 German federal election of 14 September, he was elected as a deputy to the Reichstag from electoral constituency 20 (Cologne-Aachen), and he would retain this seat until the fall of the Nazi regime in May 1945. On 1 June 1931, Schmeer became a full time Party worker when he was named Deputy Gauleiter of the newly established Gau Cologne-Aachen under Gauleiter Josef Grohé. He remained in that position until 1 September 1932, when he was appointed chief of staff to the Landesinspekteur-West. On 1 January 1933, he was made a Reichsinspekteur and Deputy to the Reichsorganisationsleiter, Robert Ley.

Following the 30 January 1933 Nazi seizure of power, Schmeer was named as Deputy Leader in the newly established German Labor Front (Deutsche Arbeitsfront, DAF) that was founded on 10 May 1933 and headed by Ley. Schmeer also served as the head of its leadership office (Leiter des Führeramtes). By 1935, he had risen to the rank of Hauptdienstleiter in the Party hierarchy. By this time he also had advanced to the rank of SA-Gruppenführer. On 13 July 1935, Prussian Minister-president Hermann Göring appointed him to the Prussian State Council. Schmeer worked closely with Göring from October 1936 as the head of the DAF office for the Four Year Plan. On 4 February 1938, he left Ley's organization to become the head of Main Department III (Trade, Economic Organization and Commerce) in the Reich and Prussian Ministry of Economics under Walther Funk, with the rank of Ministerial Director.

On 24 April 1942, he transferred to the Reich Ministry of Armaments and War Production under Albert Speer, where he was made Plenipotentiary for Simplification and Standardization of Reporting. By 1944, he was promoted to leader of the Central Reporting Office, where he remained until Germany's surrender in the Second World War. Schmeer then worked as a businessman in the Frauenaurach district of Erlangen, and he died there in September 1966.

== Writings ==
- Aufgaben und Aufbau der Deutschen Arbeitsfront, Berlin 1936.

== Sources ==
- Das Deutsche Führerlexikon 1934-1935. Berlin: Verlagsanftalt Otto Stollberg G. m. b. H. 1934.
- Lilla, Joachim (2005). Der Preußische Staatsrat 1921–1933: Ein biographisches Handbuch. Düsseldorf: Droste Verlag. ISBN 978-3-770-05271-4.
- Information about Rudolf Schmeer in the Reichstag database
