= Sachgebiet =

Sachgebiet (Administrative Area) was a term used by the Nazi Party to describe low level administrative offices of Nazi Germany. The term first appeared in 1939 and applied to the various administrative offices set up under the authority of the Nazi Party political leadership.

The leader of a Sachgebiet was known as a Leiter eines Sachgebietes and held both a political leadership rank as well as rights to wear a special political armband.

The phrase Sachgebiet was common across all levels of the Nazi Party (Local, County, Regional, and National). In some Nazi Party regions, a smaller office known as a Hilfssachgebiet (Auxiliary Area) also would exist.

== Sources ==
- Clark, J. (2007). Uniforms of the NSDAP. Atglen, PA: Schiffer Publishing
