= Ranks and insignia of the Nazi Party =

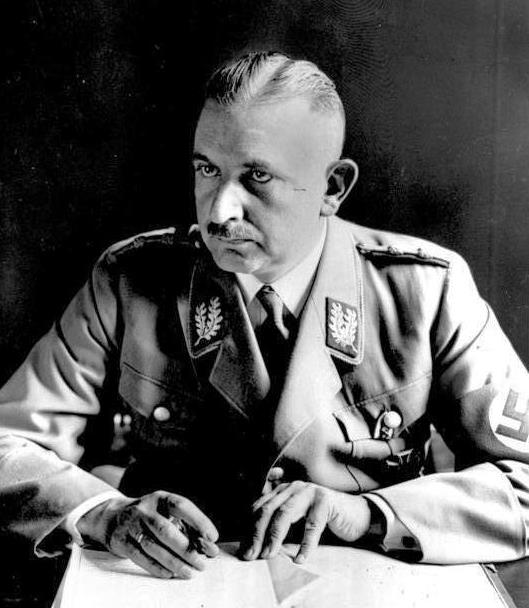
Gauleiter Bernhard Rust wearing a mid-1930s Nazi Party jacket with shoulder boards and collar patches

Ranks and insignia were used by the National Socialist German Workers' Party (NSDAP) as paramilitary titles between approximately 1928 and the fall of Nazi Germany in 1945. Such ranks were held within the political leadership corps of the Nazi Party, charged with the overseeing of the regular Nazi Party members.

The first purpose of the Nazi Party's political ranks was to provide election district leadership positions during the years where the Nazis were attempting to come to power in Germany. After 1933, when the Third Reich had been established, Nazi Party ranks played a much more important role existing as a political chain of command operating side by side with the German government.

Contrary to modern day cinema and layman perceptions regarding the Nazi Party, which often portrays all Nazis as wearing brown shirts with swastika armbands, Nazi ranks and titles were only used by a small minority within the Party, this being the political leadership corps. Regular Nazi Party members, unconnected with the political leadership, often wore no uniforms at all except for a standard Nazi Party Badge issued to all members (a golden version of this badge also existed for early Nazi Party members).

The history of Nazi Party ranks and insignia can be divided into the ranks used during several different time periods as well as the positions held by senior Nazis who were, by default, the supreme leaders of the Party regardless of what title they chose to call themselves by.

== Early Nazi Party titles ==
The early titles used by the Nazi Party were far removed from their late 1930s and World War II counterparts. Between 1921 and 1924, considered the earliest time period that the Nazi Party existed, there were no titles or ranks used by the regular Nazi Party members although several members choose to wear World War I uniforms at party meetings. When Adolf Hitler replaced Anton Drexler as the leader of the Nazi Party, Hitler began calling himself by the title of Führer (Leader), thus establishing the first formal Nazi Party titles. A position of Deputy Führer (Stellvertreter des Führers), held by Rudolf Hess was created shortly thereafter, as well as a few administrative titles such as Party Secretary and Party Treasurer, which had become formal titles by the time of the abortive Beer Hall Putsch in November 1923.

The Nazi Party was disbanded between 1923 and 1925, but upon returning the very first uniform and insignia regulations were published, albeit for the Nazi Party's paramilitary group the Sturmabteilung (SA). These early regulations created some of the earliest paramilitary titles used by the Nazis, among them Gruppenführer and Oberführer, with the regular rank and file of the SA known by the title of Mann. These titles were confined to the SA while the rest of the Nazi Party still had no formal ranks and insignia except for the titles used by senior Nazi leaders such as Hitler.

Between 1925 and 1929, it became common for Nazis to wear makeshift paramilitary uniforms at Party rallies and during this time the SA expanded its own system of insignia as did the fledgling SS (Schutzstaffel), which had begun to appear as a force within the Party. As the Nazis gained more support throughout Germany, and moved outward from their power base in Munich, regional Nazi cells began to appear in such major cities as Stuttgart, Berlin, and Heidelberg. These "local Nazis" often adopted their own uniforms and titles with little standardisation from the main Nazis operated out of Munich.

The first formal Nazi Party rank and insignia regulations were published in 1930 although standardisation across the Nazi Party did not occur until 1932. Even then it met with limited success since regional Nazi leaders, far removed from Hitler in Munich, frequently spent little effort enforcing uniform guidelines and, in some cases, outright ignored them. The early regulations called for the Nazi Party to be divided into two levels—the Politische Leitung (political leadership) and the Partei Mitglieder (party membership) with political leaders adopting standard uniforms and insignia. Hitler and his senior entourage were actually not included in the uniform regulations and continued to wear paramilitary uniforms of their own choosing without special insignia. The Nazi Party paramilitary groups, such as the SA and SS, also by this time had their own uniform and insignia regulations separate from the main Nazi Party.

The first formal Nazi Party ranks were therefore as follows:

Collar insignia	Shoulder insignia	Title	Translation
		Reichsorganisationsleiter; Reichsinspekteur	Reich organization leader Reich inspector
		Landesinspekteur	State inspector
		Gauleiter	Regional leader
		Kreisleiter	District leader
		Ortsgruppenleiter	Local group leader
		Zellenwart	Cell warden
		Blockwart	Block warden

By 1932, the Nazi Party's uniform regulations had included a series of braided shoulder boards to be worn in conjunction with Nazi collar insignia. The next major change to Nazi uniforms would occur in 1934, a year after the Nazis had come to power in Germany.

== Nazi Germany political positions ==
In 1933, the Nazi Party took national power in Germany and began a process known as Gleichschaltung to completely merge the civilian government of Germany with the political leadership of the Party. After the Night of the Long Knives in 1934, the Nazi Party underwent a major reorganisation as a prelude to Nazi leadership members merging their own positions with local, state, and federal government establishments.

The first step in this process was to divide the Nazi Party into several "levels", which were designed to act independently from each other. These levels in turn were:

- Ortsgruppen (Local level – German towns and cities)
- Kreisleitung (District level – German counties)
- Gauleitung (Regional level – German states and their provinces)
- Reichsleitung (National level – German nation)

Nazi Party political leaders were to choose a level in which they would make a career. Each level of the Nazi Party was self-contained and separate from other levels. While, in theory, this was intended to avoid jurisdictional conflict, the result was that the level leaderships ignored the wishes of the others and, in some cases, came into direct conflict. Hitler and the senior Nazi leaders were also "outside the chain", giving orders to all levels simultaneously and sometimes different party levels were given orders to carry out the same task. This caused high levels of in-fighting and backstabbing in Nazi leadership circles, to such a degree that regulations had to be introduced preventing deputies from succeeding their own superiors therefore to discourage subordinates from intentionally sabotaging their leaders.

The new Nazi Party levels called for several new ranks and the Nazi Party titles were overhauled with several new positions. Some positions were duplicated on each level of the Party while others were unique to the local, county, state, or national level. The Nazis also created a supreme political rank, known as Reichsleiter, considered the top rank of the Reichsleitung (national) level, as well as the senior-most political rank in the party next to Hitler himself.

In all, the following were the primary Nazi political staff ranks used between 1933 and 1939:

Rank group
Parteigericht
Reichsleiter	Beisitzer beim Obersten Parteigericht	Gaurichter	Kreisrichter; Ortsrichter	Gaubeisitzer	Kreisbeisitzer; Ortsbeisitzer
Reichsleitung
Reichsleiter	Hauptdienstleiter	Dienstleiter	Hauptamtsleiter	Amtsleiter	Hauptstellenleiter	Stellenleiter	Hilfs-Stellenleiter	Mitarbeiter
Gauleitung
Gauleiter	Stellvertreter gauleiter	Hauptamtsleiter	Amtsleiter	Hauptstellenleiter	Stellenleiter	Mitarbeiter
Kreisleitung
Kreisleiter	Hauptamtsleiter	Amtsleiter	Hauptstellenleiter	Stellenleiter	Mitarbeiter
Ortsleitung
Ortsgruppenleiter	Stützpunktleiter	Amtsleiter	Hauptstellenleiter	Zellenleiter	Stellenleiter	Blockleiter	Mitarbeiter

Further additions included the creation of several positional titles, which were not actual ranks but merely titles that a Nazi Party political leader could hold in addition to their own formal rank. There was at this time no outward system to denote these special titles, other than verbal and written correspondence. This would change in 1939 with the creation of the Nazi Party's armband system.

The system of Nazi Party ranks adopted in 1934 would remain unchanged throughout the remainder of the 1930s. It was not until 1939, at the start of World War II, that Nazi Party ranks would change again for a final time.

== Nazi ranks during World War II ==
The final pattern of Nazi Party ranks was designed in 1938 by Robert Ley, who personally oversaw the development of Nazi Party insignia through his position as Reichs Organisation Leader of the NSDAP, and put into effect in mid-1939. The new insignia pattern was a vast overhaul of previous designs beginning with a standardised set of twenty-eight Nazi Party ranks that were to be uniform across all levels of the Party. To denote membership in a particular "level" of the Nazi Party (local, county, regional, or national) collar tabs would display a particular colour on which the actual rank insignia would then be displayed.

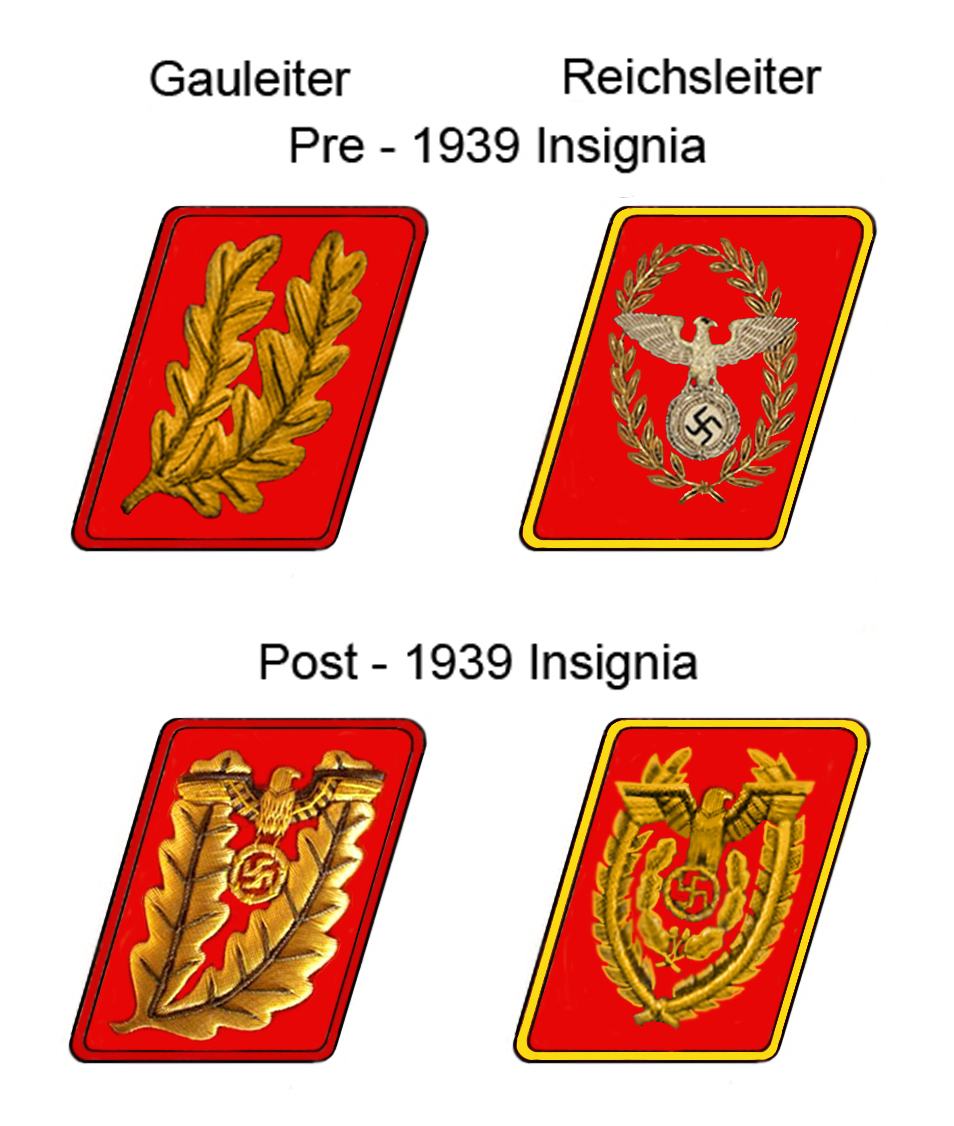
The rank insignia for Gauleiter and Reichsleiter, before and after the 1939 insignia change

This new design was intended to eliminate the manner in which different levels of the Nazi Party separated themselves and allow for command across all Party lines. For instance, an Abschnittsleiter (Section leader) in the Ortsgruppen (local) level would now be seen as outranking and could issue directives to a junior rank, such as Arbeitsleiter (Work leader) even if the junior rank served in a higher echelon of the Nazi Party, such as on the Gau (regional) or Reich (national) level. The vast array of new ranks also allowed for a military appearance to the Nazi Party, in particular during World War II when political leaders were exempt from conscription. More ranks also involved more opportunity for promotion and served as a means to distinguish highly successful political leaders from others who might hold the same position in the Nazi Party.

Within each level of the Party, there was a cap on the highest possible rank one could achieve. The heads of the lower levels, the Ortsgruppenleiter and the Kreisleiter, now held standard Nazi Party ranks in addition to their leadership titles. The positions of Gauleiter and Reichsleiter held their own special insignia and these two positions were considered outside the promotion tier and were available only by direct appointment from Hitler. Gauleiters and Reichsleiters also outranked all other Party members, regardless of standard Nazi Party ranks. Thus, the highest possible rank in each level of the Party was as follows:

Party level	Rank tab color	Highest rank in tier	Translation
Ortsgruppen	Light yellow	Oberabschnittsleiter	Senior section leader
Kreisleitung	Dark brown	Dienstleiter	Service leader
Gauleitung	Orange	Oberbefehlsleiter*	Senior command leader
Reichsleitung	Dark red	Hauptbefehlsleiter**	Head command leader

(*) The rank of Gauleiter was the senior-most rank of the Gau level but outside the regular promotion tier.

Between 1939 and 1942, these new uniform regulations were slow to be implemented and Nazi Party leaders can frequently be seen in photographic evidence wearing pre-1939 insignia well after Ley had introduced the final insignia pattern. It was not until 1943 that most Nazi Party members had completely converted to the new insignia patterns.

By the start of World War II, Nazi Party paramilitary groups had also been expanding and developing their own uniform designs, such as SS uniforms and insignia as well as uniforms used by such other Nazi groups such as the National Socialist Motor Corps (NSKK), Organisation Todt, and many others. In addition, as the Nazi Party and the German government became one and the same, each German ministry had the option to develop a standardised uniform and dress code with a state employee also having the choice to wear a Nazi Party uniform, a uniform of a Nazi paramilitary group (such as the SS or SA), or (if the person was a reservist in the military) a uniform of the Wehrmacht. This created an extremely confusing array of titles, ranks, and uniforms, which has also caused historical difficulty in determining the various positions and titles that senior members of the German government held.

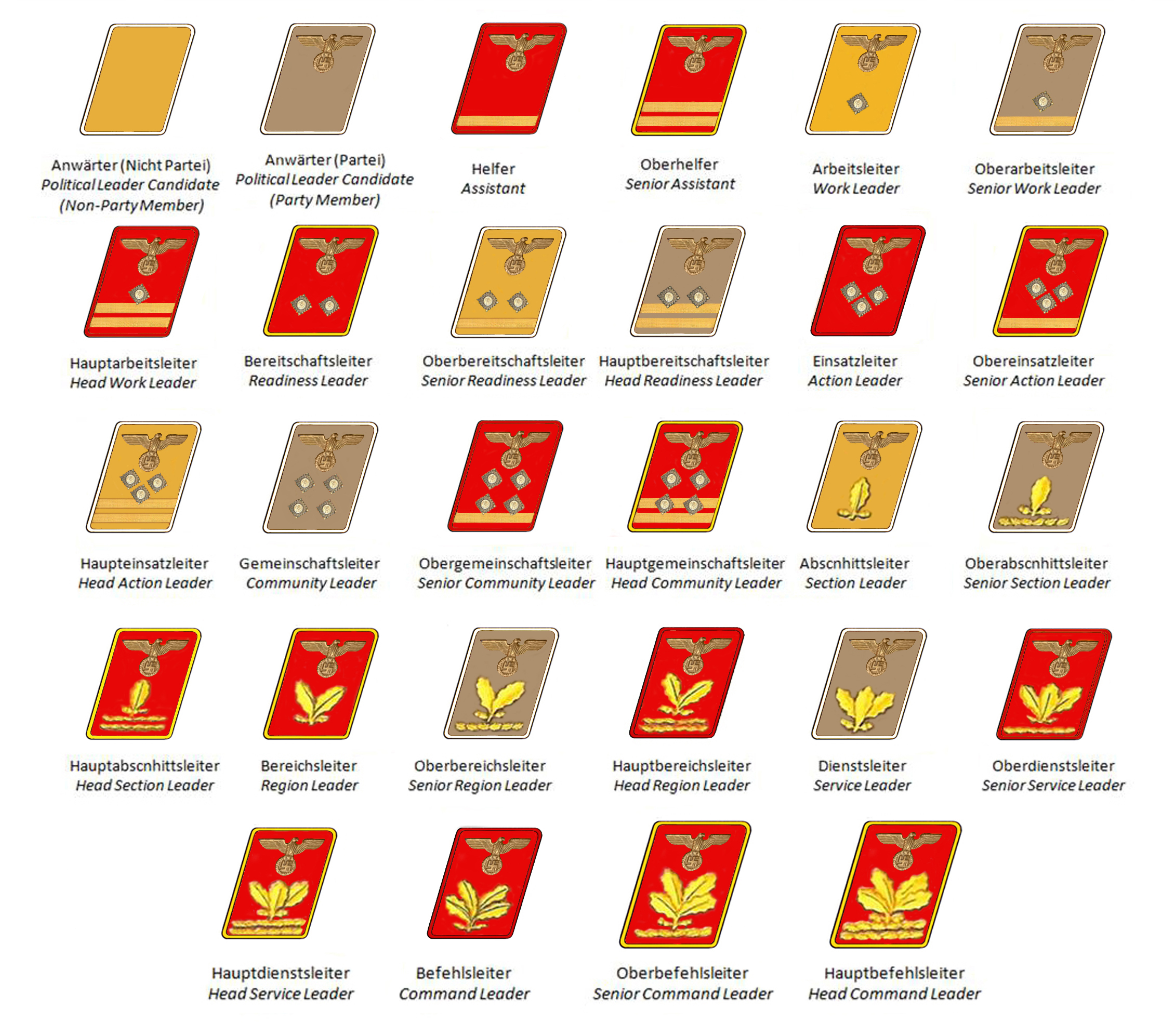
The final pattern of Nazi Party rank insignia, used from 1939 through 1945

In addition to the array of Nazi titles and ranks there also existed the original government of Germany to include such historic positions as Burgermeister (town mayor). Such individuals could also hold the approximate equivalent of a Nazi Party position or be unconnected to the Party. Through the process of Gleichschaltung, Nazi officials existed side by side with local government authorities with the local government existing as a rubber stamp to Nazi designs.

=== Armband system ===
The "armband system" was instituted by the Nazi Party in 1939 at the same time that the political leadership ranks were expanded into their final form. The purpose of the armband system was to denote positional titles within the Nazi Party in contrast to a party member's political rank.

There were three groupings of armbands, classified as "operational", "administrative", and "command". The operational armbands were used by Nazi Party political leaders on the local and county levels and were worn by those Party leaders directly engaged in implementing Party policies to the public. During World War II, this was most often associated with food rationing, war relief efforts, and civil defence.

The administrative armbands were worn by office staffs across all levels of the party, although mostly were used by the regional staffs of the Gauleiters. The third, and least common of the armbands, were the command armbands worn by the Deputy Gauleiters, Gauleiters, and Reichsleiters.

The Nazi Party armbands were intended for immediate implementation upon the outbreak of World War II in 1939, although it was not until 1943 that the system was in total effect. Even then, photographic evidence reveals it was not uncommon for some political leaders to simply wear the pre-1939 bare swastika armband, with some photographs as late as 1945 revealing political leaders failing to wear the appropriate Nazi positional armband.

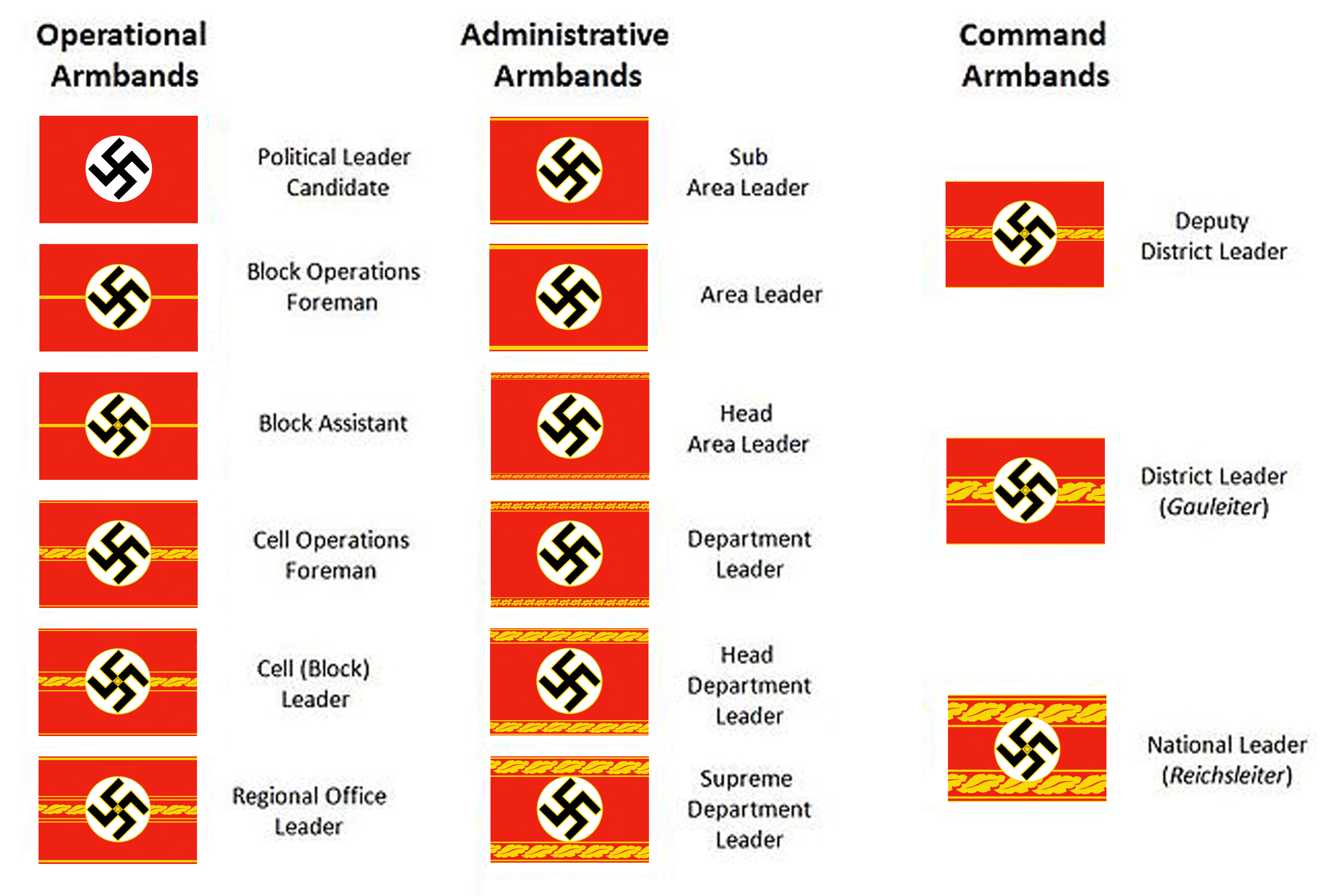
Nazi Party political armbands (1943)

By pairing up a wearer's political collar tabs and armband, it was possible to determine exactly what their position and responsibilities were within the Nazi Party political leadership corps; the armband system was also used to differentiate between Party leaders who may have held the same political ranks but were entrusted with vastly different responsibilities. For instance, a Hauptbereichsleiter who was serving as the Kreisleiter of a German county, would wear a more elaborate armband than a Nazi Party member of the same rank who was on the administrative staff of a Gauleitung.

On the local level of the Nazi Party, political armbands were often used to denote those Nazis holding the positions of Blockleiter and Zellenleiter. A further political position, unique only to the local level of the Nazi Party, was that of Betriebsobmann, which was a type of Shop Steward position. At the top tier of the operational armbands was a unique armband worn by both the Ortsgruppenleiter and the Kreisleiter

Administrative armbands were used across all levels of the Nazi Party, beginning with the position of Mitarbeiter, which was a catch-all staff position encompassing a wide variety of duties. Mitarbeiter had itself been a political rank prior to 1939, after which time the rank was phased out of the Nazi Party but survived as a political position. Leadership administrative armbands were worn by Office Leaders (Amtsleiters and Stellenleiters), of which there were eight levels of hierarchy.

In all, the Nazi political offices, denoted by special armbands, were as follows:

- Hilfssachgebiet – Auxiliary administrative area
- Sachgebiet – Administrative area
- Hilfsstelle – Auxiliary area
- Stelle – Area
- Hauptstelle – Head area
- Amtes – Office
- Hauptamtes – Head office
- Oberst Amtes – Supreme office

A leader of a political office was known as a Leiter followed by the office name. For instance, Leiter eines Sachgebietes would indicate the leader of an administrative area office.

Command armbands matched up directly with the positions of Gauleiter and Reichsleiter, each of which was denoted by its own unique armband. The political position of Deputy Gauleiter (Stellvertreter Gauleiter) was phased out as a political rank in 1939 (explaining why there was no "one leaf" Gauleiter insignia during World War II), but survived as a political armband denoting status as a Deputy Regional Leader.

The operational, administrative, and command armbands were utilised across all levels of the Nazi Party (local, county, regional, and national) with some armbands applying to multiple levels simultaneously and others specific to a particular Party level. In addition, depending on the specific duties of the political leader in question, an alternate positional title could be implied by a particular armband. When paired up with party member's political rank, this mixture of political titles and alternate positions resulted in a confusing array of titles and nomenclature.

The various political armband distribution, with primary designation listed first, was as follows

Armband designation	Orstgruppen (Local)	Kreisleitung (District)	Gauleitung (Regional)	Reichsleitung (National)
Operational
Political leader candidate	Politische Leiter Anwärter
Sonderbeauftragter
Block operations foreman	Betriebsblockobmann
Block assistant	Blockhelfer; Betriebsobmann (A)
Cell operations foreman	Betriebszellenobmann; Hauptbetriebszellenobmann
Cell/Block leader	Blockleiter; Betriebsobmann (B); Zellenleiter; Betriebsobmann (C & D); Hauptbetriebsobmann
Regional office leader	Ortsgruppenleiter	Kreisleiter
Administrative
Sub area leader	Mitarbeiter; Leiter eines Hilfssachgebietes; Leiter eines Sachgebietes; Leiter eines Hilfsstelle
Blockwalter; Blockobmann
Area leader	Leiter eine Stelle
Zellenwalter; Zellenobmann
Head area leader	Leiter einer Hauptstelle
Department leader	Leiter eines Amtes
Head department leader	Leiter eines Hauptamtes
Supreme department leader	Leiter eines Oberst Amtes
Command
Deputy district leader	Stellvertreter Gauleiter
District leader	Gauleiter
National leader	Reichsleiter

== Senior Nazi Party titles ==
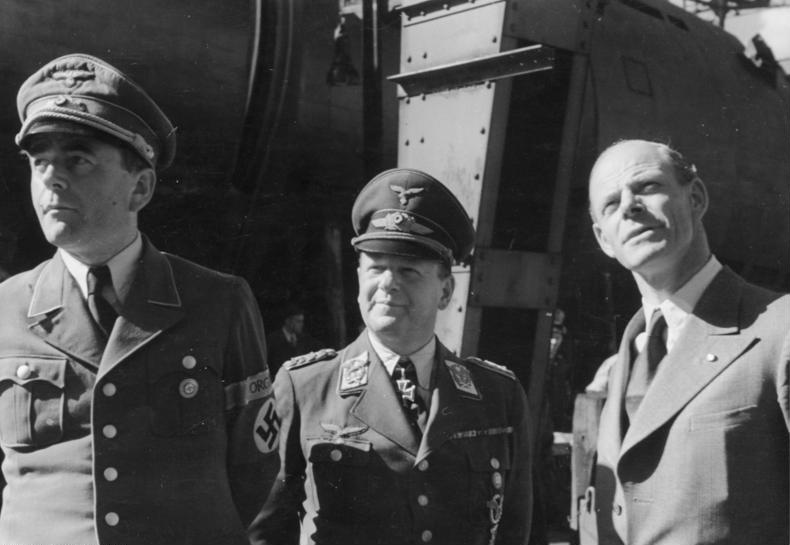
Albert Speer (far left) wearing the uniform of Organisation Todt. Speer, who was a Hauptdienstleiter in the NSDAP, chose to wear a uniform with little insignia rather than a full uniform of the Nazi Party.

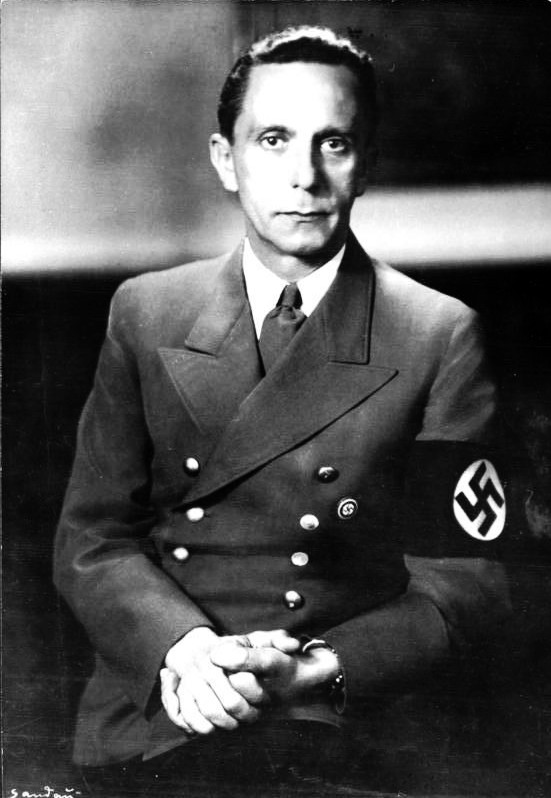
The standard uniform of Joseph Goebbels, consisting of a brown Nazi Party jacket, with no insignia, and a bare swastika armband. This generic "catch-all" style uniform was worn by many top Nazis who held cabinet and ministry level positions in the German government.

The senior leadership of the Nazi Party were intentionally removed from Nazi Party political ranks, with such senior leaders unquestionably above and outranking all other members of the Party. This concept has been interpreted by historians to imply that the leadership was the "spring" from which Nazi promotions, ranks, and awards were granted, to be bestowed upon the lesser members of the Party. Under this concept, Hitler and his inner circle needed no grand titles, heaps of awards, or elaborate uniforms since they were already known as the most senior members of the state and party. It is for this reason that Hitler and senior Nazis are frequently seen in photographic and film evidence as wearing uniforms with little insignia or uniforms without excessive decorations. This set Hitler apart from other dictators of the time, such as Benito Mussolini who appointed himself First Marshal of the Empire and wore a full Italian military uniform with many state and military decorations displayed.

Hitler, who served as Führer of the Nazi Party, held the absolute highest possible Nazi Party position. Albert Speer (in his book Inside the Third Reich) remarked that Hitler was the only party member to wear a solid gold "Golden Eagle of Sovereignty Pin" on his civilian jackets (every other member wearing the round party badge), though the jacket design itself did not differ from other civilian jackets of the time. This "Führer Badge" was the only unique insignia ever created to denote Hitler's rank as Führer.

Prior to 1939, Hitler wore a brown paramilitary uniform, considered the uniform of the Oberste SA-Führer (Supreme Storm Trooper Commander). Upon the outbreak of World War II, Hitler adopted a grey army style uniform, without any particular insignia, with Hitler pledging that he was the “first soldier” of the German Reich and would wear his army style uniform until "victory has been achieved or I will not survive the outcome".

Heinrich Himmler was a senior member of the Nazi Party and is most well known as Reichsführer-SS; as a result, most of Himmler's attire is connected to his SS uniform. In addition to being Reichsführer-SS and a Reichsleiter, towards the end of World War II he held numerous high level positions including Commander of the Replacement Home Army and General Plenipotentiary for the entire Reich's administration (Generalbevollmächtigter für die Verwaltung). Himmler however, never chose to wear a Nazi Party uniform and all photographs of him are in either civilian clothes or in his SS uniform.

Other high Nazi positions, that did not entail any particular insignia, included the office of Deputy Führer held by Rudolf Hess until he personally flew his Messerschmitt Bf 110 fighter plane to Scotland and crash landed at Eaglesham in 1941. He was captured, imprisoned, and then sent to England. The office of Deputy Führer was thereafter abolished.

Martin Bormann held the title of Party Secretary, during which time he wore the uniform of a Reichsleiter. Bormann would later take up cabinet-level positions in the German government, and after receiving his (honorary) SS membership he wore the insignia of an SS-Obergruppenführer. Albert Speer, in his early days as the Party Architect, wore a brown Nazi party jacket similar to the insignia-less uniform that Joseph Goebbels wore throughout his career as Nazi Propaganda Minister. As for Speer, he would later adopt the uniform of Organisation Todt, and towards the end of World War II wore a senior Nazi Party political uniform through his position as Minister of Armaments.

Some senior Nazis did incorporate themselves into the standard Nazi Party rank system, but only at the highest levels. Robert Ley held the position of Reichsleiter and Julius Streicher was a Gauleiter. Hermann Göring is most associated with his rank of Reichsmarschall, but was also a Gruppenführer in the SA as well as the equivalent of a Reichsleiter through his position as Director of the Four Year Plan.

== Comparison tables ==
In its simplest form, the Nazi Party command structure was divided into four basic levels: the general membership known as the Parteimitglieder (lit. 'party members'), the political leadership corps known as the Politische Leiters (lit. 'political leaders'), the upper command levels of the Party encompassed by the Gauleiters and Reichsleiters, and finally the position of Führer held solely by Adolf Hitler as supreme leader of the Party (a position of Deputy Führer also existed until 1941).

=== Political ranks ===
Apart from this basic organisation, the Nazi Party political ranks expanded over a period of twenty five years into a vast array of nomenclature denoted by a plethora of insignia and positions. From 1930 onward, this encompassed the political ranks, divided into the following time periods.

Pre-1930	1930–1932	1933–1938	1939–1945
Anwärter (Nicht Partei)
Mitglieder
Anwärter
Helfer
Oberhelfer
Blockwart	Mitarbeiter	Arbeitsleiter
Oberarbeitsleiter
Hilfs-Stellenleiter	Hauptarbeitsleiter
Zellenwart	Stellenleiter	Bereitschaftsleiter
Hauptstellenleiter	Oberbereitschaftsleiter
Hauptbereitschaftsleiter
Amtsleiter	Einsatzleiter
Obereinsatzleiter
Haupteinsatzleiter
Stützpunktleiter	Gemeinschaftsleiter
Obergemeinschaftsleiter
Hauptgemeinschaftsleiter
Politischer Leiter	Ortsgruppenleiter	Abschnittsleiter
Oberabschnittsleiter
Hauptabschnittsleiter
Kreisleiter	Bereichsleiter
Oberbereichsleiter
Hauptamtsleiter	Hauptbereichsleiter
Dienstleiter
Oberdienstleiter
Hauptdienstleiter
Befehlsleiter
Oberbefehlsleiter
Stellvertreter Gauleiter	Hauptbefehlsleiter
Gauleiter
Landesinspekteur
Reichsinspekteur
Reichsorganisationsleiter	Reichsleiter
Stellvertreter des Führers
Der Führer

=== Party ranks and party positions ===
Party rank	Wehrmacht equivalent	Party position
Oberster Führer (Highest Leader) - Adolf Hitler
Reichsleiter	Generalfeldmarschall	Senior leadership - Reichs level
Gauleiter	Generaloberst	Senior leadership - Gau level
Hauptbefehlsleiter	General der Waffengattung	Senior administrative positions
Oberbefehlsleiter	Generalleutnant	Senior administrative positions
Befehlsleiter	Generalmajor	Senior administrative positions
Hauptdienstleiter	Generalmajor	Senior administrative positions
Oberdienstleiter	Generalmajor	Senior administrative positions
Dienstleiter	Generalmajor	Senior administrative positions
Hauptbereichsleiter	Oberst	Kreisleiter (Area leader)
Oberbereichsleiter	Oberst	Kreisleiter (Area leader)
Bereichsleiter	Oberst	Kreisleiter (Area leader)
Hauptabschnittsleiter	Oberst	Kreisleiter (Area leader)
Oberabschnittsleiter	Oberst	Kreisleiter (Area leader)
Abschnittsleiter	Oberst	Kreisleiter (Area leader)
Hauptgemeinschaftsleiter	Oberstleutnant	Ortsgruppenleiter (Regional office leader)
Obergemeinschaftsleiter	Oberstleutnant	Ortsgruppenleiter (Regional office leader)
Gemeinschaftsleiter	Major	Ortsgruppenleiter (Regional office leader)
Haupteinsatzleiter	Hauptmann/Rittmeister	Zellenleiter (Cell leader)
Obereinsatzleiter	Oberleutnant	Zellenleiter (Cell leader)
Einsatzleiter	Leutnant	Blockleiter (Block leader); Zellenleiter (Cell leader)
Hauptbereitschaftsleiter	Stabsfeldwebel	Blockleiter (Block leader); Zellenleiter (Cell leader); Zellenwalter (Cell operations foreman or cell presider)
Oberbereitschaftsleiter	Oberfeldwebel	Blockleiter (Block leader); Zellenwalter (Cell operations foreman or cell presider)
Bereitschaftsleiter	Feldwebel	Blockleiter (Block leader); Zellenwalter (Cell operations foreman or cell presider)
Hauptarbeitsleiter	Unterfeldwebel	Blockwalter (Block operations foreman or block presider); Zellenwalter (Cell operations foreman or cell presider)
Oberarbeitsleiter	Unterfeldwebel	Blockwalter (Block Operations Foreman or Block Presider)
Arbeitsleiter	Unteroffizier	Blockhelfer (Block assistant or block helper); Blockwalter (Block operations foreman or block presider)
Oberhelfer	Obergefreiter	Blockhelfer (Block assistant or block helper)
Helfer	Gefreiter	Helfer (Assistant or helper)
Politischer-Leiter Anwärter (Parteigenosse - Pg.)	Soldat	--
Politischer-Leiter Anwärter (Nicht-Parteigenosse - Nicht-Pg.)	Rekrut; Freiwilligenbewerber	--

== See also ==
- Nazi Germany paramilitary ranks
- Ranks and insignia of the Waffen-SS, the Nazi Party's military forces
- The Encyclopedia of the Third Reich
- Uniforms and insignia of the Schutzstaffel
- Uniforms and insignia of the Sturmabteilung

== Sources ==
- Clark, Jeff (2007). Uniforms of the NSDAP. Atglen, PA: Schiffer Military History. ISBN 978-0-7643-2579-3.
