= Amtsleiter =

Nazi Party political rank

Amtsleiter Office leader
- National level collar tab
- Country: Nazi Germany
- Service branch: Nazi Party
- Rank: Political rank
- Formation: 1933
- Abolished: 1939
- Next higher rank: See list
- Next lower rank: Hauptstellenleiter

Amtsleiter (transl. Office leader) was a Nazi Party political rank which existed between 1933 and 1938. The rank was created as a "catch all" political staff position across all levels of the Nazi Party (local, county, region, and national) and encompassed a wide array of duties and responsibilities.

A special rank of Hauptamtsleiter existed on the Reichsleitung (National Level) of the Nazi Party. In 1939, the two ranks of Amtsleiter were phased out of the Nazi Party and replaced by several new paramilitary political ranks.

== Insignia ==
Rank group	Higher rank	Hauptamtsleiter	Amtsleiter
Reichsleitung	Hauptdienstleiter
Gauleitung	Stellvertretergauleiter	None
Kreisleitung	Kreisleiter	None
Ortsleitung	Stützpunktleiter	None
