= SS-Bewerber =

SS-Bewerber or Staffel-Bewerber ([bəˈvɛʁbɐ]; "SS-Applicant") was an SS rank used in Nazi Germany from 1934 to 1945. The rank of SS-Bewerber was the lowest possible SS rank and was assigned to those personnel who were candidates in the SS. The rank was used in the Allgemeine-SS as a prelude to appointment as an SS-Anwärter (recruit).

Within the Allgemeine-SS, the rank of SS-Bewerber was (more often than not) used simply as an administrative title while a background investigation was being conducted on a potential SS member. Typically this would involve a criminal history check, political reliability screening, and investigation into the prospective SS member's racial background.

Junior Rank; None	SS rank SS-Bewerber	Senior Rank SS-Anwärter

== Bibliography ==
- McNab, Chris (2009). The SS: 1923–1945. Amber Books Ltd. ISBN 978-1-906626-49-5.
