= Betriebsobmann =

Political position in the Nazi Party

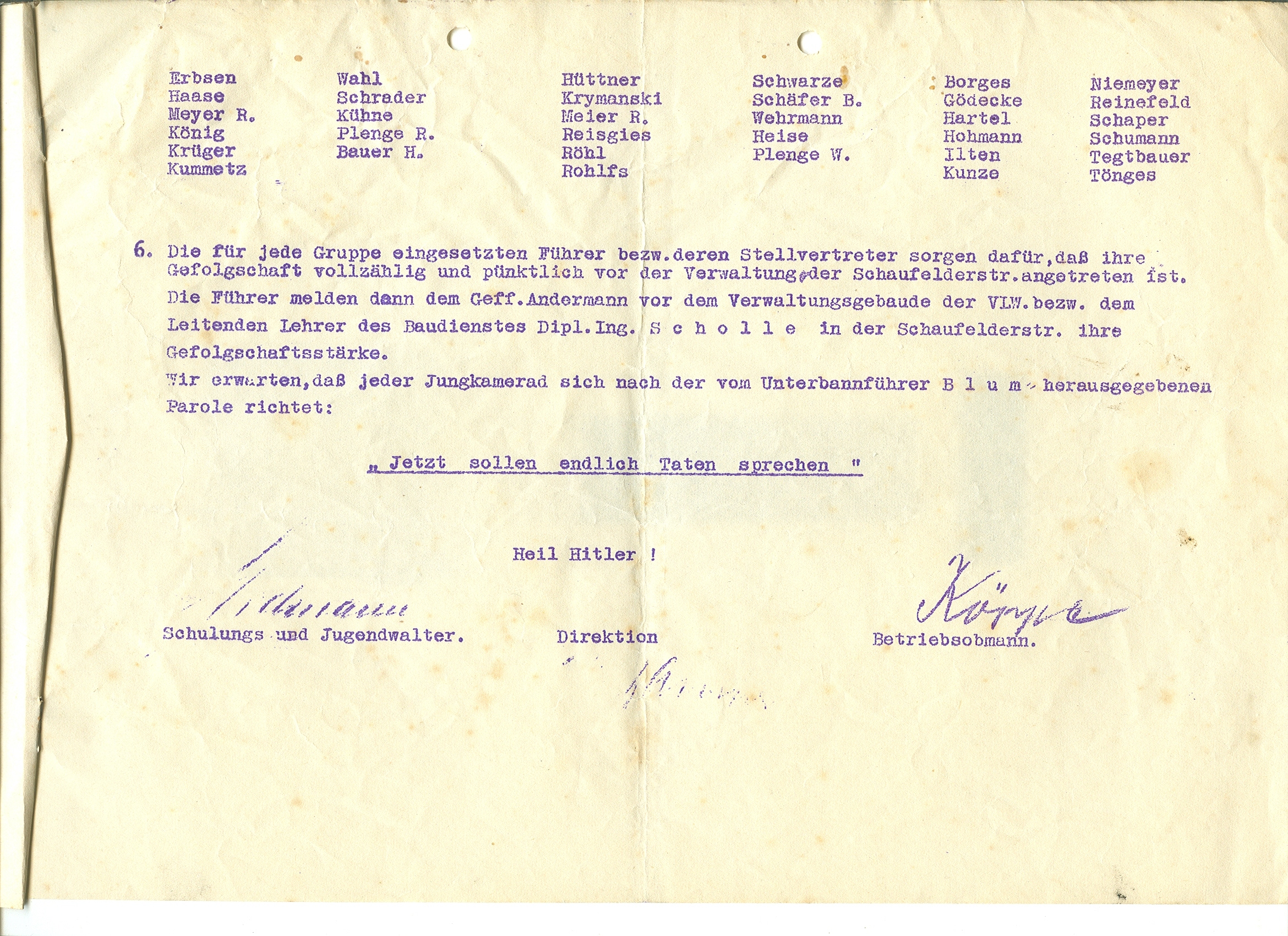
Order to build a special "Fliegerschar" as a part of a Hitler Youth project in Hannover. It is signed by the Betriebsobmann at the lower right.

Betriebsobmann was a political position of the Nazi Party which existed between 1939 and 1945. The term first came into being at the start of World War II and was unique only to the local level of the Nazi Party, known as the Ortsgruppen.

== Duties ==
Translated as Shop Steward, or literally "Workers' Representative", the duties of the Betriebsobmann were generally the same as a labor union foreman and focused primary on the local level of war production as well as representing the interests of factory workers. Later, as the war progressed, the Betriebsobmann were in charge of production quotas and often would report workers who were not meeting standards. War defeatism and anti-Nazi sympathies were also immediately reported.

== Seniority ==
Betriebsobmann was divided into four levels of seniority, denoted by a letter placed after the title ranging from (A), (B), (C), and (D).

In addition to the primary rank of Betriebsobmann, a junior rank of Betriebsblockobmann existed as an assistant to the local Blockleiter. There was also a "Cell Operations Foreman" position, known as Betriebszellenobmann as well as a senior foreman position known as Hauptbetriebsobmann. In all, the following were the various levels of seniority:

- Betriebsblockobmann
- Betriebsobmann (A)
- Betriebszellenobmann
- Hauptbetriebszellenobmann
- Betriebsobmann (B)
- Betriebsobmann (C)
- Betriebsobmann (D)
- Hauptbetriebsobmann

The position of Betriebsobmann was not an actual political rank, but rather a title. Those Nazi Party members holding the position of Betriebsobmann also would hold one of several Nazi Party paramilitary ranks. The position of Betriebsobmann would be denoted by a political armband.

== Sources ==
- Clark, J. (2007). Uniforms of the NSDAP. Atglen, PA: Schiffer Publishing
