= Bereichsleiter =

Nazi Party political rank

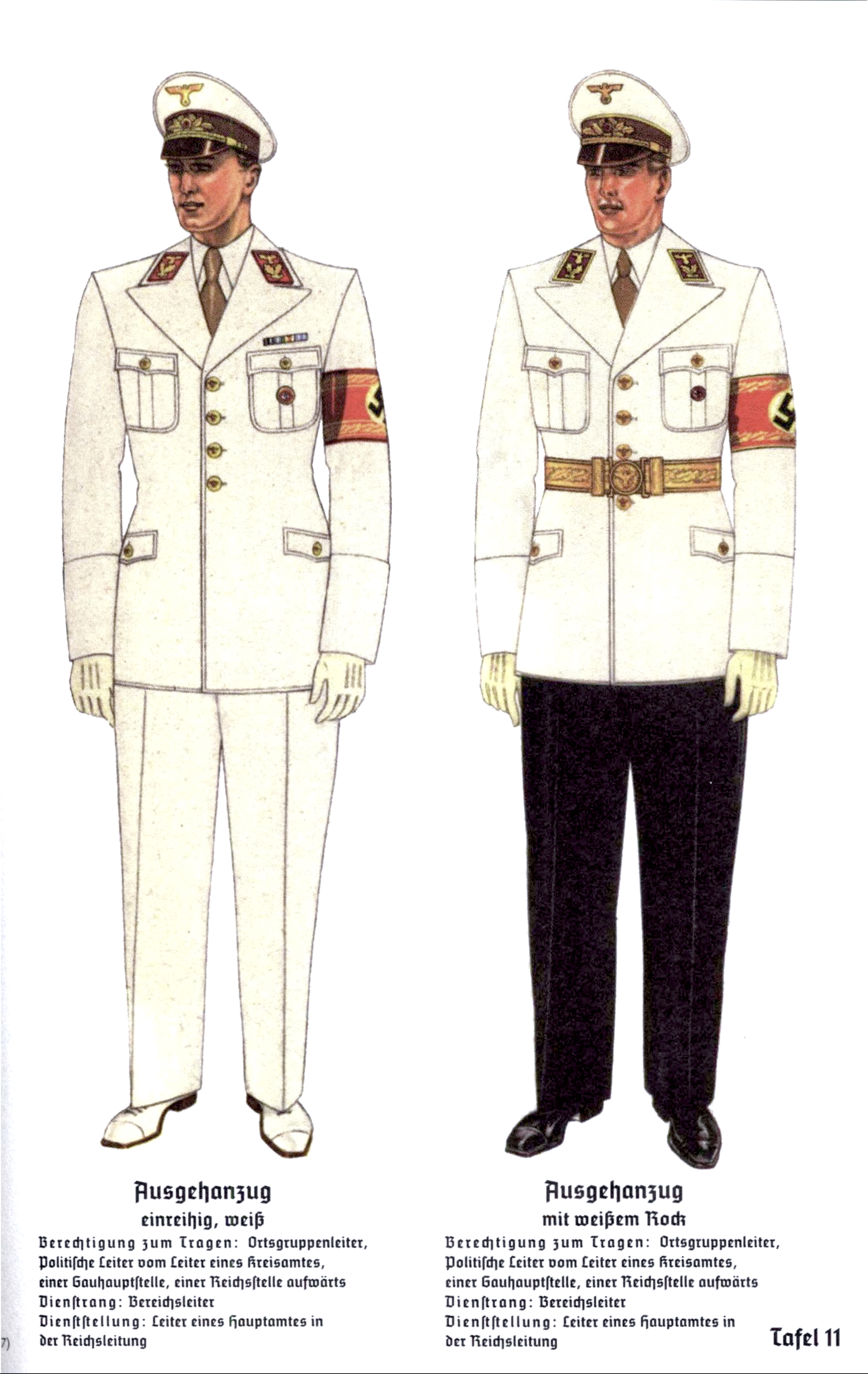
Bereichsleiter dress uniform, 1940

Bereichsleiter (Department Leader) was a Nazi Party political rank which existed between the years of 1939 and 1945. The rank of Bereichsleiter was created primarily to replace the older rank of Kreisleiter (County Leader) but was also used on higher levels of the Nazi Party (Regional and National) as a senior Chief of Staff position. Those Bereichsleiters who were assigned to the position Kreisleiter were now denoted through the use of a special political armband.

== Sources ==
- Clark, J. (2007). Uniforms of the NSDAP. Atglen, PA: Schiffer Publishing
