= Mitarbeiter (NSDAP) =

Mitarbeiter Co-worker
- National level collar tab

- Armband
- Country: Nazi Germany
- Service branch: Nazi Party
- Rank: Political rank
- Formation: 1933
- Abolished: 1939
- Next higher rank: Stellenleiter
- Next lower rank: None

Related articles
- History: Blockleiter

Mitarbeiter (transl. Work Colleague, co-worker) was a Nazi Party political rank and title which existed between 1933 and 1945. As a political rank, Mitarbeiter was created in 1933 after the Nazis came to power in Germany. Considered the lowest political rank, Mitarbeiter replaced the older rank of Blockleiter and was also used as an administrative staff rank on the Kreis (County), Gau (Region), and Reich (National) Party Levels.

In 1939, the political rank of Mitarbeiter was phased out and replaced by several new paramilitary political positions. The term Mitarbeiter survived as a political title after this, and was denoted by a special armband.

== Insignia ==
Rank	Higher rank	Mitarbeiter
Reichsleitung	Hilfs-Stellenleiter
Gauleitung	Stellenleiter
Kreisleitung	Stellenleiter
Ortsleitung	Blockleiter; Stellenleiter

== Sources ==
- Clark, Jeff (2007). Uniforms of the NSDAP. Atglen, PA: Schiffer Military History. ISBN 978-0-7643-2579-3.
