= Stützpunktleiter =

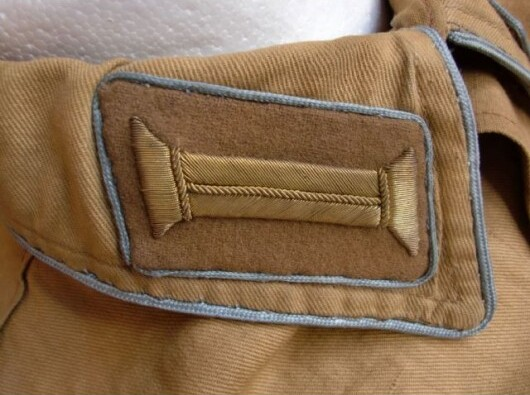
Rank insignia of a Stützpunktleiter

Stützpunktleiter (Base Action Leader) was a Nazi Party political rank which existed between 1933 and 1938. The rank was created as an adjutant position to the Ortsgruppenleiter of a German town or city. In 1939, the rank of Stützpunktleiter was phased out and replaced by several new paramilitary political ranks.
