= Abschnittsleiter (NSDAP) =

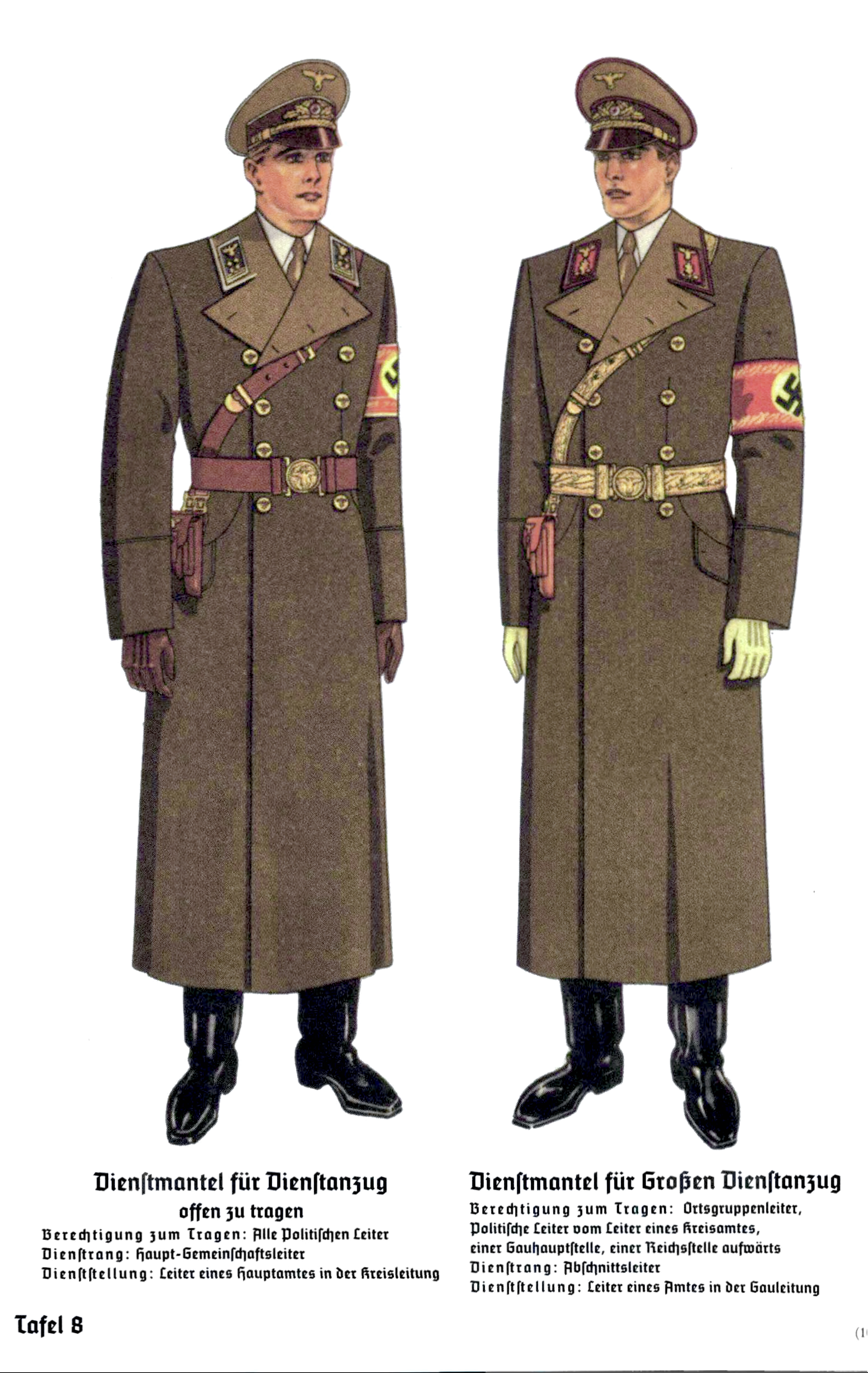
Dress coat of an Abschnittsleiter, 1940 (right)

Gorget patch of an Abschnittsleiter

Abschnittsleiter, German for "Section Leader," was also a Nazi Party political rank of Nazi Germany which existed between 1939 and 1945. Divided into three levels (Abschnittsleiter, Oberabschnittsleiter, and Hauptabschnittsleiter) the rank replaced the older rank of Ortsgruppenleiter and was further used as a middle level administrative rank on the Kreis (County), Gau (Region), and Reich (National) Party Levels.

== Sources ==
- Clark, J. (2007). Uniforms of the NSDAP. Atglen, PA: Schiffer Publishing
