= Anwärter =

Rank in the SS

NSDAP Anwärter insignia for full party members

Anwärter (German pronunciation: [ˈanvɛʁtɐ]) is a German title that translates as "candidate", "applicant" or "recruit". During the Nazi era, SS-Anwärter was used as a paramilitary rank by both the Nazi Party and the Schutzstaffel (SS). Within the Nazi Party, an Anwärter was someone who had been accepted into a government service position and the rank was issued in two degrees: one for party members and the other for non-party members. Anwärter was the lowest Nazi Party rank in the extensive system of Nazi Party political ranks.

As an SS rank, an SS-Anwärter was a recruit, someone who had applied for membership in the SS and was undergoing a probationary period, after which time an appointment would be issued to the rank of SS-Mann. The earliest recorded use of Anwärter as an SS rank was 1932;

Within the Allgemeine SS, the transition from Anwärter to Mann was an extensive process, typically taking over one year. During that year, a potential SS member would be drilled and indoctrinated; racial, political, and background checks would also be conducted. At the end of this time, typically in an elaborate ceremony, an Anwärter would be promoted to the rank of SS-Mann.

After 1941, Anwärter was also used as a rank of the Waffen-SS, but to a much lesser degree than in the general SS. A Waffen-SS Anwärter was usually a recruit who had been processed into the SS (typically at a recruiting station) but had yet to report for basic training. Once basic training began, the Anwärter was promoted to the rank of SS-Schütze.

Between 1942 and 1945, an even lower rank existed within the SS known as Bewerber. The SS was the only Nazi paramilitary group to have a rank lower than that of Anwärter. The SS rank of Anwärter used no insignia.

In modern-day Germany, the title of Anwärter is typically used by those applying for employment and also as a designation for members of the Bundeswehr who are under consideration for a leadership assignment.

Junior status SS-Bewerber	SS rank SS-Anwärter	Senior status SS-Mann

== Insignia ==
NSDAP

SS

== Bibliography ==
- McNab, Chris (2009). The SS: 1923–1945. Amber Books Ltd. ISBN 978-1-906626-49-5.
- Stein, George (2002) [1966]. The Waffen-SS: Hitler's Elite Guard at War 1939–1945. Cerberus Publishing Ltd. ISBN 978-1841451008.
