= Kreisleiter =

Nazi Party political rank

- Country: Nazi Germany
- Service branch: Nazi Party
- Rank: Political rank
- Next higher rank: Gauleiter
- Next lower rank: Ortsgruppenleiter

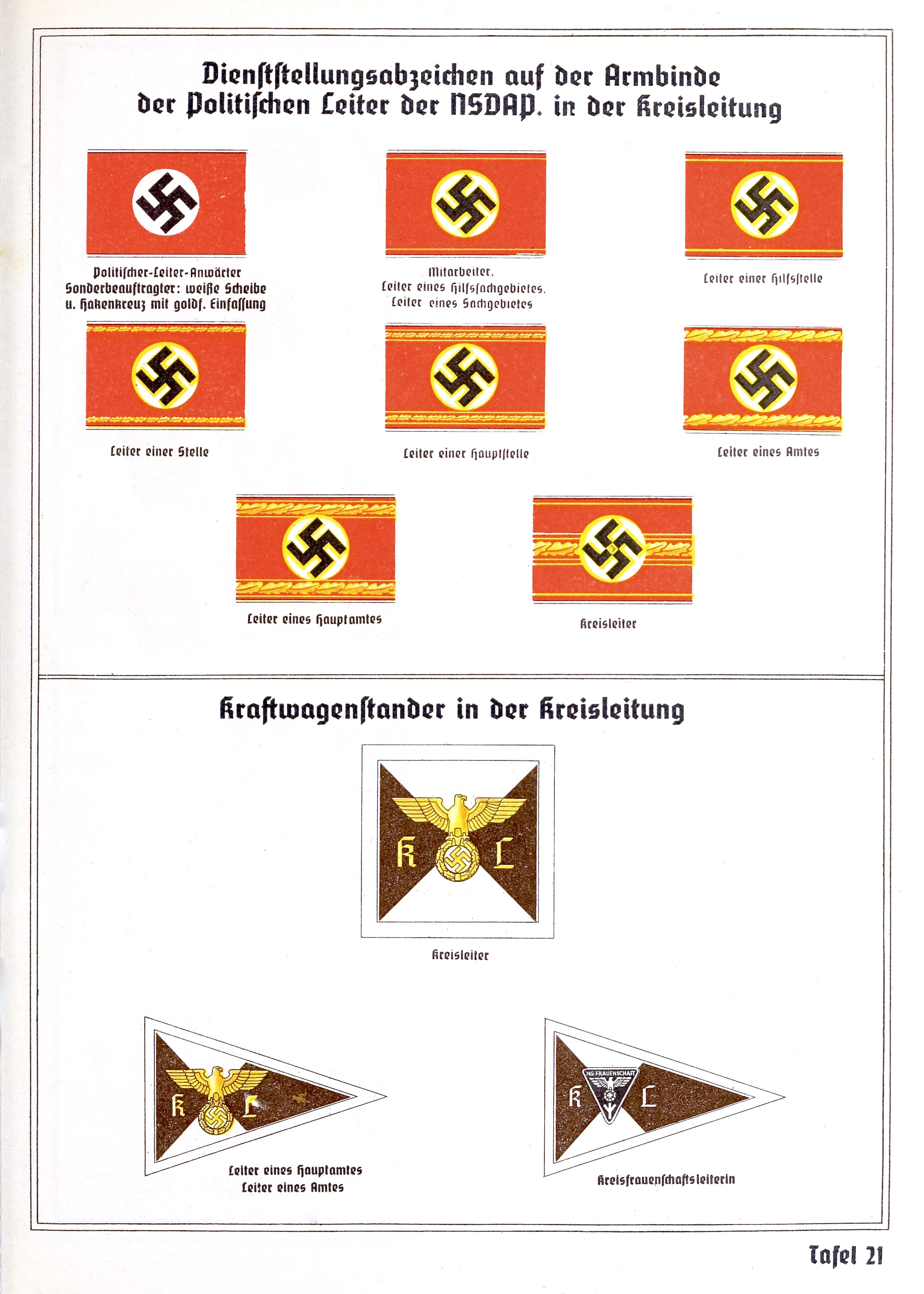
Armbands and vehicle flags and pennants appropriate to a Kreisleiter (1939).

Kreisleiter (German pronunciation: [ˈkʁaɪsˌlaɪtɐ]; "District Leader") was a Nazi Party political rank and title which existed as a political rank between 1930 and 1945 and as a Nazi Party title from as early as 1928. The position of Kreisleiter was first formed to provide German election district coordination and, after the Nazi assumption of power, the position became one of county municipal government, effectively replacing the traditional German government establishment.

The rank of Kreisleiter was phased out of the Nazi Party in 1939, to be replaced by one of several paramilitary political ranks. After this time, the position of Kreisleiter was denoted by a special armband.

The rank of Kreisleiter was originally the fourth tier in the Nazi Party hierarchy after the Führer, Reichsleiter, and Gauleiter. The fifth level beneath the Kreisleiter were the Ortsgruppenleiters.

== Sources ==
- Clark, J. (2007). Uniforms of the NSDAP. Atglen, PA: Schiffer Publishing
