= Dienstleiter (NSDAP) =

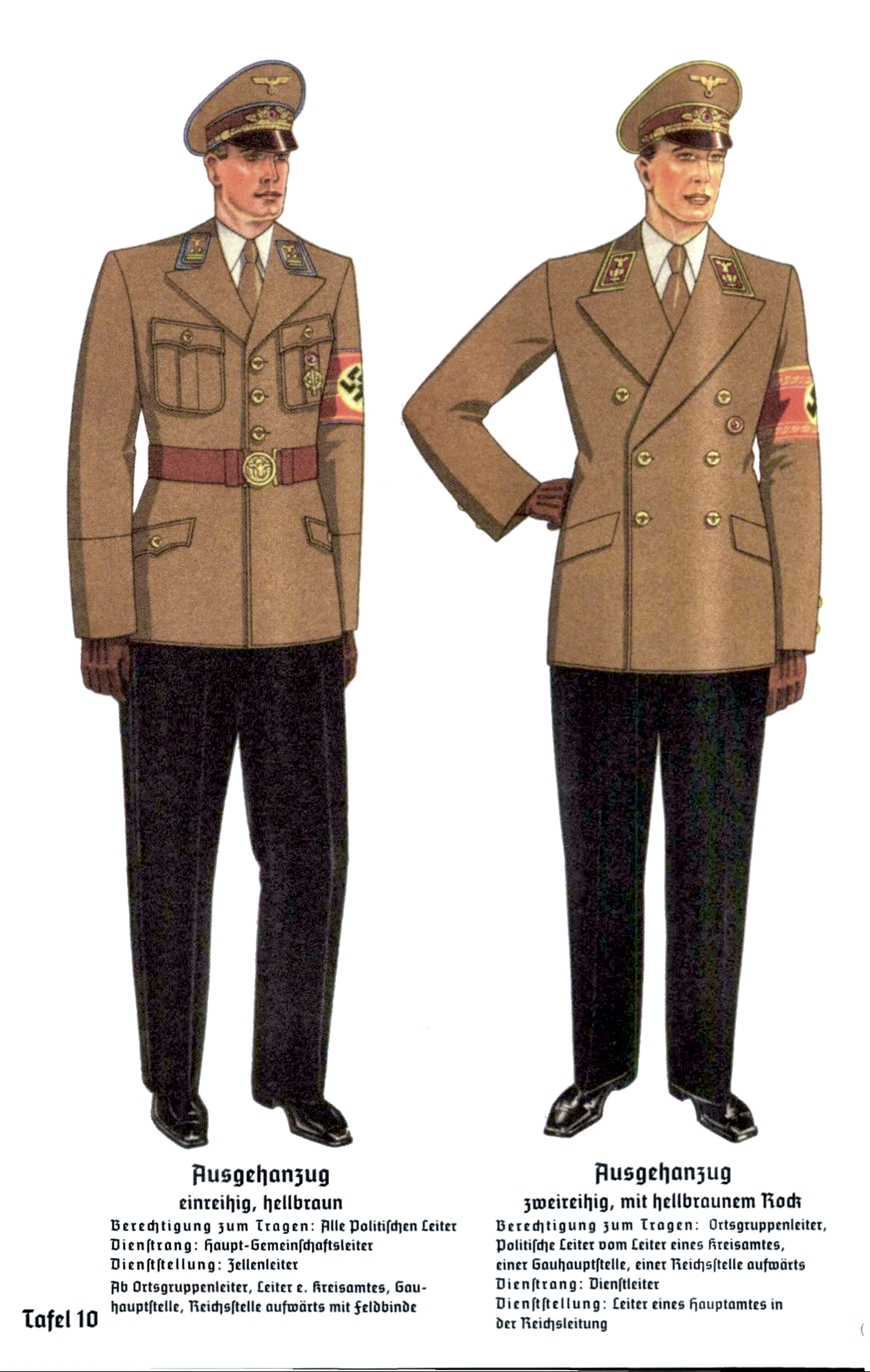
Formal dress of a Dienstleiter (right), 1940

Dienstleiter (Service Leader) was a high-ranking Nazi Party political rank of Nazi Germany which existed between 1933 and 1945. The rank was first created after the Nazi assumption of power and served as the second highest rank of the Reichsleitung Nazi Party organizational level, subordinate to the Reichsleiter.

== Creation and early usage ==
The rank of Dienstleiter was created in the year 1933 after Adolf Hitler became Chancellor of Germany. Almost immediately, the Nazis began the process of Gleichschaltung to eliminate local government and merge government and civil positions with the political structure of the Nazi Party. The rank of Dienstleiter was the highest promotable rank of the National Party level, although a higher rank of Reichsleiter also existed by direct appointment from Hitler.

The original version of Dienstleiter was divided into two separate ranks: the standard Dienstleiter rank and a higher rank of Hauptdienstleiter. Duties of the rank primary entailed leadership of top national party offices, and many holding the rank of Dienstleiter also held top governmental and civil positions in the German government.
