= Ortsgruppenleiter =

Nazi Party political rank

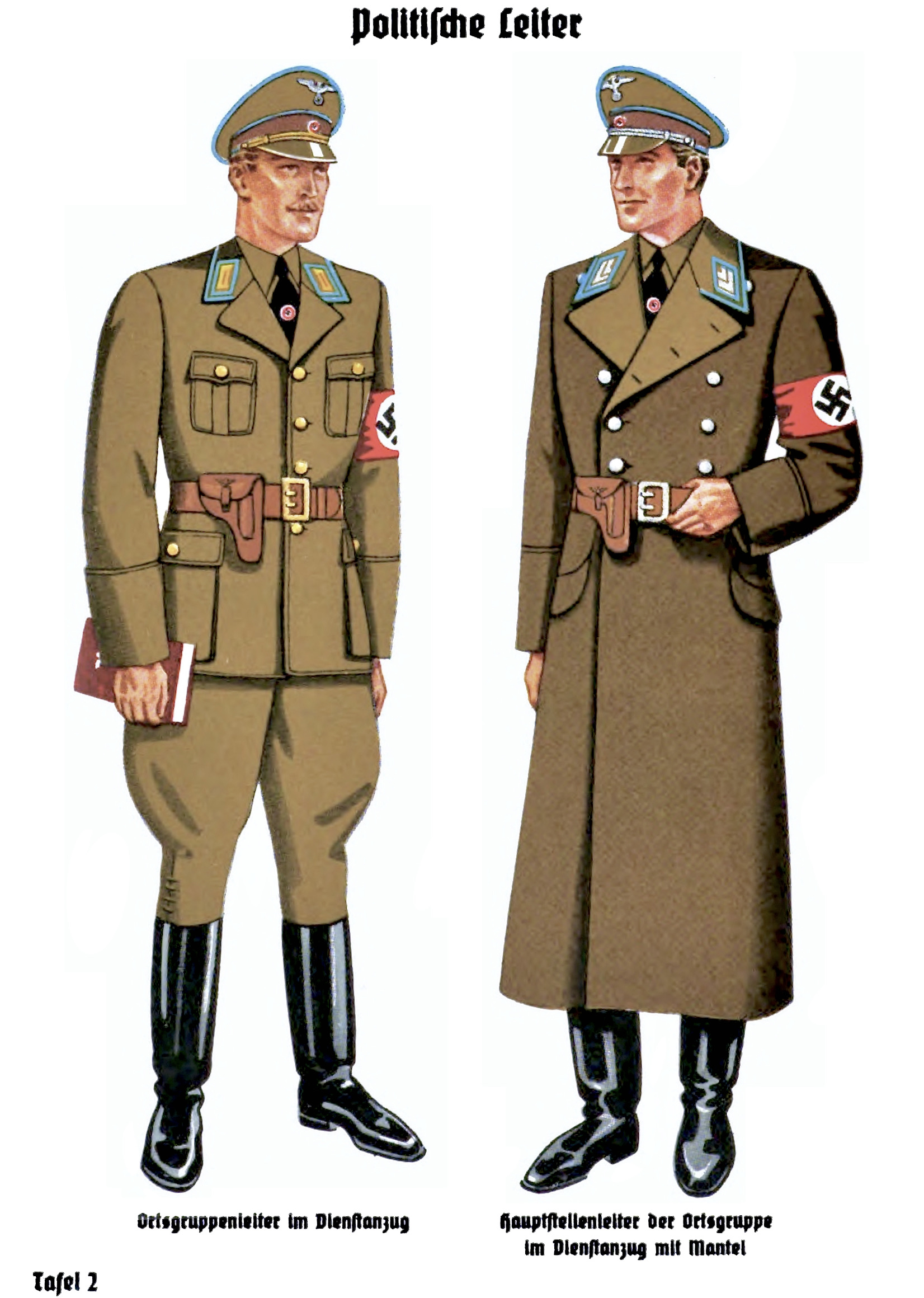
Ortsgruppenleiter in uniform (left), 1938

Ortsgruppenleiter (Local Group Leader) was a Nazi Party political rank and title which existed between 1930 and 1945. The term first came into being during the German elections of 1930, and was held by the head Nazi of a town or city, or in larger cities, of a neighbourhood, for the purposes of election district organization. After 1933, through the process of Gleichschaltung, the position of Ortsgruppenleiter evolved into the Nazi leader of a large town or city or of a city district.

== Role in Municipal Government ==
After the founding of Nazi Germany, the political rank of Ortsgruppenleiter was held by the chief Nazi in a municipal area. In many situations, town and city administration overlapped with the Nazi political system, meaning that the traditional local government was overshadowed, if not entirely replaced, by Nazi leadership. Traditional government titles did continue to exist, such as Bürgermeister; however, if these positions were not already held by a corresponding Nazi official, city government was little more than a rubber stamp to Nazi designs.

During World War II, the position of Ortsgruppenleiter encompassed a large amount of responsibility and power as it was these Nazi officials who typically ran the city civil defense systems as well as the allocation of war rations and civil relief efforts. As Germany was invaded and defeat became imminent, Nazi leaders in major towns and cities also became ad hoc military commanders in charge of mixed-unit German forces and Volksturm units.

== Insignia ==
Between 1930 and 1932, the political rank of Ortsgruppenleiter was denoted by a braided shoulder cord and a white collar bar worn on a Nazi Party brown shirt. After 1933, the rank was denoted by two light yellow collar bars. The actual rank of Ortsgruppenleiter was phased out of the Nazi Party in 1939, replaced by a large number of expanded paramilitary political titles. The position of Ortsgruppenleiter was after this time typically held by a Nazi with the rank of Abschnittsleiter, paired as well with a political armband denoting the specific position of Ortsgruppenleiter.
