= 2019 Birthday Honours =

British government recognitions

The 2019 Queen's Birthday Honours are appointments by some of the 16 Commonwealth realms of Queen Elizabeth II to various orders and honours to reward and highlight good works by citizens of those countries. The Birthday Honours are awarded as part of the Queen's Official Birthday celebrations during the month of June. The Queen's Birthday Honours for the United Kingdom and the Commonwealth realms were announced on 8 June, except the honours for New Zealand that were announced on 3 June and for Australia on 10 June.

== United Kingdom ==
Below are the individuals appointed by Elizabeth II in her right as Queen of the United Kingdom with honours within her own gift, and with the advice of the Government for other honours.

=== Knight Bachelor ===
- Simon Russell Beale, CBE, Actor. For services to Drama.
- Charles Edward Beck Bowman, JP, Lately Lord Mayor of London. For services to Trust in Business, International Trade and the City of London.
- Professor Ian Lamont Boyd, FRSE, Chief Scientific Adviser, Department for Environment, Food and Rural Affairs. For services to Science and Economics on Food and the Environment.
- Nigel Martyn Carrington. For services to Higher Education and the Creative Industries.
- Professor Mark Jonathan Caulfield, Chief Scientist, Genomics England and Professor of Clinical Pharmacology, Queen Mary University of London. For services to the 100,000 Genomes Project.
- Dr. Stephen John Cleobury, CBE, Director of Music, King's College, Cambridge. For services to Choral Music.
- Robert Paul Cohan, CBE, Founding Artistic Director, The Place. For services to Choreography and Dance.
- Jonathan Andrew Coles, Chief Executive, United Learning. For services to Education.
- Ian Edward Lamert Davis, chairman, Rolls-Royce Holdings plc. For services to Business.
- Professor Peter James Donnelly, FRS, Chief Executive, Genomics plc and Professor of Statistical Science, University of Oxford. For services to the Understanding of Human Genetics in Disease.
- Brian Harold Donohoe. For parliamentary and political service.
- George Ernest Craythorne Hamilton, QPM, Chief Constable, Police Service of Northern Ireland. For services to Policing and to the community in Northern Ireland.
- The Right Honourable George Edward Howarth, MP. For parliamentary and political service.
- The Right Honourable Norman Peter Lamb, MP. For public and political service.
- David Willoughby Pountney, CBE – Director. For services to Opera.
- Ian Isaac Stoutzker, CBE, Founder Chairman, Live Music Now. For services to Music and to Philanthropy.
- Archibald Boyd Tunnock, CBE. For services to Business and to charity.
- James Garwood Michael Wates, CBE, chairman, Wates Group. For services to Business and to charity.
- Professor Robert Hughes Williams. For services to Higher Education, Research and the Welsh Language.
- Simon Woolley. For services to Race Equality.

=== Order of the Bath ===
==== Knight Grand Cross of the Order of the Bath (GCB) ====
Military

- General Sir Nicholas Carter, KCB, CBE, DSO, ADC Gen

==== Knight/Dame Commander of the Order of the Bath (KCB/DCB) ====
Military

- Lieutenant General Nick Pope, CBE

Civil

- Stephen Lovegrove, CB – Permanent Under-Secretary, Ministry of Defence. For public service.
- Andrew Parker – Director General, Security Service. For public service.

==== Companion of the Order of the Bath (CB) ====
Military

- Rear Admiral Jonathan Pentreath, OBE
- Major General Charles Stickland, OBE
- Major General Nicholas John Cavanagh
- Lieutenant General Paul Jaques, CBE
- Air Vice-Marshal Chris Luck, MBE
- Air Vice-Marshal Gavin Parker, OBE

Civil

- Deborah Ruth Alder – Director General, Human Resources, Department for Work and Pensions. For public service.
- Graham Archer – Director, Improvement and Learning, Children's Social Care, Department for Education. For services to Children and Families.
- Kieran James Donnelly – Comptroller and Auditor General for Northern Ireland. For services to the Northern Ireland Audit Office.
- Christine Helen Hewitt-Dyer – Lately Human Resources Director, People, Capability and Change, Ministry of Housing, Communities and Local Government. For public service.
- Craig Richard Eblett – Senior Responsible Officer, Health Transformation Programme, Department for Work and Pensions. For services to Welfare Reform.
- Sarah Elizabeth Healey – Lately Director General, Economic and Domestic Affairs Secretariat, Cabinet Office. For public service.
- Nicholas Beverley Joicey – Director General for Strategy, International and Biosecurity, Department for Environment, Food and Rural Affairs. For services to the Environment.
- Andrew John McCully OBE – Director General, Early Years and Schools Group, Department for Education. For services to Education.
- Anthony Jan Michael Meggs – Lately Chief Executive, Infrastructure and Projects Authority and Head, Government Project Delivery Profession. For public service.
- Frances Clare Nash – Legal Director, Department for Work and Pensions. For public service.
- Graham Parker CBE – Fiscal Expert, Office for Budget Responsibility. For services to the Economy.
- Glyn Williams – Director General, Borders, Immigration and Citizenship Systems Policy and International Group, Home Office. For public service.

=== Order of St Michael and St George ===
==== Knight Commander of the Order of St Michael and St George (KCMG) ====
- Clive William Jones, CBE, lately Chair of Trustees for the Disasters Emergency Committee. For services to humanitarian crises.
- Jonathan McLeod Grigor Taylor, lately Vice-President of the European Investment Bank. For services to investment and the economy.
- Alexander Younger, CMG, Chief, Secret Intelligence Service. For services to national security.

==== Companion of the Order of St Michael and St George (CMG) ====
- Christopher Derek Bain. For services to International Development and Humanitarian Work.
- Professor Richard John Carwardine. For services to the Study of American History in the UK and the USA.
- Professor Charlotte Watts. For services to Global Health and International Development.
- Julian Nicholas Braithwaite, Permanent Representative, UK Mission to the World Trade Organization, United Nations and other International Organisations in Geneva, Switzerland. For services to British foreign policy.
- Lawrence Arthur Covington, OBE, Lately Law Enforcement Adviser for the Caribbean Overseas Territories and Bermuda. For services to the Caribbean Overseas Territories and Bermuda.
- Peter Jeremy Oldham Hill, Legal Counsellor, Foreign and Commonwealth Office. For services to British foreign policy.
- Professor Ian Richard Hodder, Professor of Anthropology, Stanford University, USA. For services to archaeology and UK/Turkey relations.
- John Edward Hubbard, Director, Foreign and Commonwealth Office. For services to national security.
- Professor Virgil Craig Jordan, OBE, Professor of Breast Medical Oncology, MD Anderson Cancer Center, University of Texas, USA. For services to women's health.
- David Barclay Keegan, Director, Foreign and Commonwealth Office. For services to national security.
- Graeme Jonathan Knott, H.M. Ambassador, Warsaw, Poland. For services to British foreign policy.
- Angus Charles William Lapsley, Director for Defence, International Security and South East Europe, Foreign and Commonwealth Office. For services to British foreign policy.
- Julia Longbottom, Director, Consular Services, Foreign and Commonwealth Office. For services to British foreign policy and British Nationals overseas.
- Moazzam Tufail Malik, H.M. Ambassador, Jakarta, Indonesia. For services to British foreign policy and international development.
- Rebecca Hay Elliott Walton, Regional Director, British Council. For services to UK cultural relations.

=== Royal Victorian Order ===
==== Knight Commander of the Royal Victorian Order (KCVO) ====
- Sir Henry Egerton Aubrey-Fletcher, Bt, Lord-Lieutenant of Buckinghamshire

==== Commander of the Royal Victorian Order (CVO) ====
- Clive Alderton LVO, Principal Private Secretary to The Prince of Wales and The Duchess of Cornwall.
- Richard David Brown, Formerly Treasury Officer of Accounts, H M Treasury.
- Susan Elaine, The Dowager Countess of Darnley, Lord-Lieutenant of Herefordshire.
- Colonel Richard Edward Harrold, OBE, Formerly Tower Group Director, Historic Royal Palaces.
- James Ingleby, Lord-Lieutenant of Aberdeenshire.
- Philip John Algernon Sidney, Viscount De L'Isle MBE, Lord-Lieutenant of Kent.
- William Tucker, Lord-Lieutenant of Derbyshire.
- Dione Angela, The Countess of Verulam, Formerly Lord-Lieutenant of Hertfordshire.
- Martin Ronald Watson LVO, Partner, Forest House Veterinary Group.

==== Lieutenants of the Royal Victorian Order (LVO) ====
- Margaret Ashby MVO, Formerly Head of Learning and Development, Royal Household.
- Karen Hilary Ashworth MVO, Senior Paintings Conservator, Royal Collection.
- Lieutenant Colonel Richard Callander, OBE, TD, DL, Formerly Secretary, The Queen's Body Guard for Scotland, Royal Company of Archers.
- Kevin Frank Clarke. For services to the Royal Household.
- Megan Gent MVO, RVM, Senior Archives Conservator, Royal Collection.
- Sharon Lee Prendergast, Director, Australian Honours and Awards Secretariat, Government House, Canberra.
- Jemima Rellie, Director of Content and Audiences, and Acting Visitor Experience Director, Royal Collection.
- Hartley Thorbjorn Richardson OC, OM, Formerly Chairman, Canadian Charter for Business.
- Emma Stuart MVO, Senior Curator, Books and Manuscripts, and Acting Librarian, Royal Library, Windsor Castle.
- Andrew Merlay Wright, Formerly Treasurer to the Household of The Prince of Wales and The Duchess of Cornwall.

==== Members of the Royal Victorian Order (MVO) ====
- Benjamin Julius Bolgar, Senior Director, The Prince's Foundation.
- Alison Victoria Cameron, Inventory Assistant, Gifts and Inventory Section, Household of The Prince of Wales and The Duchess of Cornwall.
- Jeremy Cheek. For services to the Royal Collection.
- Sergeant John De-Bolla, Metropolitan Police. For services to Royalty and Specialist Protection.
- Marnie Elizabeth Gaffney, Assistant Communications Secretary, Royal Household.
- Geoffrey David Golding, managing director, G. D. Golding (Tailors) Ltd.
- Assistant Chief Constable David Hardcastle. For services to the Royal Household.
- Beverley Jones RVM, Housekeeping Assistant, Royal Household.
- Catherine Teresa Martin, Formerly Learning Officer (Operations), Royal Collection, Windsor Castle.
- Edward Mark Bruton Priday, Manager, Coutts & Co.
- Constable John Edward Pritty, Metropolitan Police. For services to Royalty and Specialist Protection.
- Stephen John Read RVM, Property Steward, Thatched House Lodge.
- Andrew James Richardson, Senior Events Co-ordinator, Royal Household.
- John Brian Sinnott CBE, Clerk to the Leicestershire Lieutenancy.
- Ian Craig Spencer, Premier Sous Chef, Royal Household.

=== Royal Victorian Medal (RVM) ===
==== Bar to the Royal Victorian Medal (Silver) ====
- Russell Peter Sturgess, RVM, Forestry Team Supervisor, Crown Estate, Windsor

==== Royal Victorian Medal (Silver) ====
- Michael Dabbs, MBE, Divisional Sergeant Major, The Queen's Body Guard of the Yeomen of the Guard
- Jason William Farmilo, Palace Attendant, Windsor Castle.
- Monica Ingrid Farrow, Personnel and Accounts Officer, Office of the Governor of Queensland.
- Gary Norman Le Poidevin, Head Gardener, Government House, Guernsey.
- Stewart Orr, Fire and Security Team Leader, Palace of Holyroodhouse.
- Clive Richard Thomas, Engineering Craft Assistant, Royal Household.

==== Honorary Royal Victorian Medal (Silver) ====
- Antonella Fresolone, Housekeeper to The Duke and Duchess of Cambridge, Kensington Palace.

=== Order of the British Empire ===
==== Knight Grand Cross of the Order of the British Empire (GBE) ====
- Sir Michael John Burton QC – President, Investigatory Powers Tribunal. For services to the Rule of Law.

==== Knight/Dame Commander of the Order of the British Empire (KBE/DBE) ====
Civil

- Elizabeth Pauline Lucy Corley CBE – Senior Advisor to Allianz Global Investors. For services to the Economy and Financial Services.
- Carolyn Julie Fairbairn – Director General, Confederation of British Industry. For services to UK Business.
- Jacqueline Foster MEP – Member of the European Parliament for the North West of England. For public and political service.
- Julie Ann Kenny CBE – chair, Wentworth Woodhouse Preservation Trust. For services to Heritage.
- Laura Elizabeth Lee – Chief Executive, Maggie's. For services to Cancer Patients.
- Professor Elan Closs Stephens CBE – For services to Welsh Government and Broadcasting.
- Sara Thornton CBE QPM – Lately Chief Constable, chair, National Police Chiefs' Council. For services to Policing.
- Rachel Whiteread CBE – Sculptor. For services to Art.

Military

- Air Marshal Stuart Atha, CB, DSO, Royal Air Force – Former Deputy Commander (Operations) RAF Air Command

==== Commander of the Order of the British Empire (CBE) ====
Military Division

Royal Navy

- Commodore Paul Dominic Burke, OBE, Royal Navy, C033412M.
- Major General Matthew John Holmes, DSO, Royal Marines, N028280S.
- Commodore, (now Vice Admiral) Jeremy Paul Kyd, Royal Navy, C032542N. – Fleet Commander

Army

- Brigadier Paul Robert Burns
- Acting Brigadier John Lockhart Clark
- Colonel Guy Hugh John Deacon, OBE, ADC
- Deputy Chaplain General The Reverend Michael Paul Dare Fava, QHC
- Brigadier Ian Jonathan Gibb
- Acting Brigadier George Alexander John Macintosh, OBE

Royal Air Force

- Group Captain Hamish Roy Callender Cormack, Royal Air Force
- Group Captain Teresa Anne Griffiths, OBE, ARRC, Princess Mary's Royal Air Force Nursing Service
- Group Captain Shaun Harris, MBE, Royal Air Force

Civil Division

- Morris Timothy Angel, OBE, Chairman, Angels Costumes. For services to Theatre, Film, Television and the Arts.
- Bryan Appleyard, Journalist and Author. For services to Journalism and the Arts.
- Professor Elizabeth Florence Barnes. For services to Higher Education.
- Michael Barton, QPM, Chief Constable, Durham Constabulary. For services to Policing.
- Professor Paul David Bates, Professor of Hydrology, Bristol University. For services to Flood Risk Management.
- Graeme Henderson Biggar, Lately Director, Office for Security and Counter Terrorism, Home Office. For services to National Security.
- Dr. Stephen Robert Billingham, Chairman, Urenco. For services to Government Owned, Public and Regulated Companies.
- Simon William Blanchflower, Lately Programme Director, Network Rail. For services to the Railway.
- Catherine Annick Caroline Bradley, Non-Executive Board Member, Financial Conduct Authority. For public service.
- Philip Graeme Howard Brook, Chairman, All England Lawn Tennis and Croquet Club. For services to Tennis.
- Glenn Brown, Painter. For services to Art.
- Professor Kenneth Alexander Brown, FRSE, Professor of Mathematics, University of Glasgow. For services to the Mathematical Sciences.
- Professor Michele Jane Burman, FRSE, Head, School of Social and Political Sciences, University of Glasgow. For services to Criminology.
- Valerie Joan Cain, Lately People and Change Director, Government Legal Department. For public service.
- Ian Callum, Chief Designer, Jaguar Cars. For services to the British Car Industry.
- Susan Jane Catchpole, Director, HM Treasury. For public service.
- Rachel Maud Elizabeth Clacher. For services to Business and Disadvantaged Young People.
- Paul Christopher Clarke, Chief Technology Officer, Ocado. For services to Digital Retailing and Technology.
- Professor Graham Leon Collingridge, FRS. For services to Biomedical Sciences.
- Olivia Colman (Sarah Caroline Sinclair), Actress. For services to Drama.
- Michelle Cracknell, Chief Executive, The Pensions Advisory Service. For services to the Pensions Industry.
- Dr. Adrian Mark Crellin, Consultant Clinical Oncologist, Leeds Teaching Hospitals NHS Trust and Trustee, Cancer Research UK. For services to Radiotherapy.
- Professor Lorne Donald Crerar. For services to Economic and Community Development in Scotland.
- Stuart Crooks, Managing Director, Hinkley Point C, EDF Energy. For services to Nuclear Energy.
- Marcus Davey, OBE, Chief Executive and artistic director, The Roundhouse. For services to the Arts.
- Paul Richard Dean, Head of Operational Support, Office for Security and Counter Terrorism, Home Office. For services to Security and Counter Terrorism.
- Steven Douglas, Group Chief Executive Officer, Altair. For services to the Housing Industry.
- Jonathan Dove, Composer. For services to Music.
- Professor Harminder Singh Dua, Professor of Ophthalmology and Visual Sciences, University of Nottingham. For services to Eye Healthcare, Health Education and Ophthalmology.
- Professor Stephen Eames, Chief Executive, North Cumbria University Hospitals NHS Trust and Cumbria Partnership NHS Foundation Trust. For services to the NHS.
- Rebecca Egan, Head, Tackling Exploitation and Abuse Unit, Home Office. For services to Vulnerable People.
- Benedict Blackstone Evans, Director, London Design Festival. For services to the Creative Industries.
- Paul Anthony Evans. For services to Parliament.
- Patrick Richard Evershed. For public and political service.
- Ian Findlay, Chief Officer, Paths for All. For services to Healthy Lifestyles and Outdoor Activities.
- John Richard Evelegh Footman, Secretary, Bank of England. For services to the Economy.
- Deidre Ann Ford, Group Managing Director, Bauer Media, Radio. For services to Radio.
- Professor Tamsin Jane Ford, Professor of Child and Adolescent Psychiatry, University of Exeter. For services to Psychiatry.
- Michael Peter Galloway, OBE, Lately Executive Director, City Development, Dundee City Council. For services to Architecture and City Regeneration.
- David Alan Gill. For services to Football.
- Deborah Mary Gillatt, Director, Business Frameworks, Department for Business, Energy and Industrial Strategy. For services to the Economy.
- Nigel Alexander Gooding, Deputy Director, Department for Environment, Food and Rural Affairs. For services to the Marine Environment.
- James Dover Grant (Lee Child), Author. For services to Literature.
- David Middleton Gray, Lately Chairman, Ofgem. For services to Regulation.
- Stephen Greene, co-founder and chief executive officer, RockCorps and lately chair, National Citizen Service Trust. For services to Young People.
- Christina Susan Mary Hallett. For services to Civil Society, Mentoring and Coaching.
- The Lady Hamlyn (Helen Roice), Philanthropist. For services to charity.
- Andrew Heath, MBE. For services to the Music Industry.
- The Honourable Timothy Mark Hely Hutchinson, Lately Chief Executive, Hachette UK. For services to Publishing and Literature.
- Phinella Frances Henderson, Deputy Director, Treasury Legal Advisers, Government Legal Department. For public service.
- The Rt. Hon. Professor Charles Hendry, former Prime Minister's Trade Envoy to Azerbaijan, Kazakhstan and Turkmenistan and former Commissioner for the UK Pavilion at Expo 2017, Kazakhstan. For services to UK trade and investment
- Jonathan Lascelles Iremonger, Assistant Chief of Staff for Finance, Permanent Joint Headquarters, Ministry of Defence. For services in Support of Military Operations.
- Lorraine Alison Jackson, Deputy Director, Data Policy, Department of Health and Social Care. For services to Health Policy.
- Lucy Margaret Juckes, chair, Barrington Stoke Publishing. For services to Education and Literacy.
- Sandra Kerr, OBE, Race Equality Director, Business in the Community. For services to Equality and Diversity.
- Joanna Sarah Key, Director, Legislation and Constitution, Department for Exiting the EU. For public service.
- Anthony Hugh Gordon Laithwaite, Entrepreneur. For services to the UK and Global Wine Industry.
- Professor John Latham, Vice-Chancellor, Coventry University. For services to Higher Education.
- Professor Marie Corinne Lyne le Quéré, FRS, Professor, School of Environmental Sciences and Tyndall Centre for Climate Change Research, University of East Anglia. For services to Climate Change Science.
- Dr Shane Legg, Co-founder and Chief Scientist, DeepMind Technologies Ltd. For services to the Science and Technology Sector and Investment.
- Professor Jason Andrew Leitch, National Clinical Director, Health and Social Care Directorate, Scottish Government. For services to Healthcare and charity.
- Barnaby John Lenon, Chair, Independent Schools Council and Chair of Governors, London Academy of Excellence. For services to Education.
- Gary Nigel Lewitt, Head of Resources, Defence Intelligence. For services to Defence.
- Caroline Margaret Low, Director, Department for Transport. For public service.
- Professor Graham Alexander MacGregor, Professor of Cardiovascular Medicine, Wolfson Institute of Preventive Medicine. For services to Cardiovascular Disease.
- Joanna Clare MacGregor, OBE, Pianist. For services to Music.
- Professor Hector Lewis MacQueen, FBA, FRSE, Professor of Private Law, University of Edinburgh. For services to Legal Scholarship.
- Dr. Thomas Michael Maguire. For services to Justice in Northern Ireland.
- Stuart Marks. For voluntary political service.
- Francis Paul Augustine Martin, President, British Chambers of Commerce and Partner, BDO Northern Ireland. For services to UK Business.
- Dr. Alan Gregory McDevitt, Lately Chairman, Scottish General Practitioners Committee, British Medical Association. For services to the NHS and General Practitioners in Scotland.
- Rebecca Meredith, Chief Executive Officer, Transform Trust, East Midlands and Humber. For services to Education.
- Anna-Marie Morrison. For services to Apprenticeships.
- Mitch Murray, Songwriter, Record Producer and Author. For services to Music.
- Terence O'Neill. For services to Photography.
- Grace Chidozie Ononiwu, OBE, Chief Crown Prosecutor, West Midlands, Crown Prosecution Service. For services to Law and Order.
- Mark Padmore, Tenor. For services to Music.
- Judith Ann Paget, Chief Executive Officer, Aneurin Bevan University Health Board. For services to Healthcare Management and Delivery in Wales.
- Stuart Leslie Patrick, Chief Executive, Glasgow Chamber of Commerce. For services to Business and the Economy in Glasgow.
- Susan Mary Elizabeth Percy, Chief Executive, Chartered Institution of Highways and Transportation. For services to Transport.
- Ronald Leslie Randall. For services to the British Meat Trade and to charity.
- Melanie Jane Richards, Deputy Chair, KPMG. For services to Business and Inclusion.
- Professor Sylvia Therese Richardson, Director, Medical Research Council Biostatistics Unit, University of Cambridge. For services to Medical Statistics.
- David Lawton Roberts, Chairman, Nationwide Building Society. For services to Financial Services and the NHS.
- Colin Robertson, Chief Executive, Alexander Dennis. For services to Exports and the Bus and Coach Manufacturing Sector.
- Dr. Bharat Kumar Hansraj Shah. For services to Business, Economic Growth, Exporting, Independent Pharmacy Sector and Philanthropy.
- Dr. Samir Shah, OBE, Chief Executive and Creative Director, Juniper Television. For services to Television and to Heritage.
- Professor Michael Roy Sharland, Chairman, Advisory Committee on Antimicrobial Resistance and Consultant Paediatrician, St George's University Hospitals NHS Foundation Trust.
- Professor Mark Edmund Smith, FREng, Vice-Chancellor, Lancaster University. For services to Research and Higher Education.
- Philip Patrick Smith, Chief Executive Officer, Cisco. For services to Technology, Business and Skills.
- Dr. Shubulade Mary Eniola Smith, Consultant Psychiatrist, South London and Maudsley NHS Foundation Trust. For services to Forensic Psychiatric Intensive Care .
- Professor David John Southwood, Lately Chair, UK Space Agency. For services to Space Science and Industry in the UK and Europe.
- Michael Stewart, SCS1, Ministry of Defence. For services to Defence.
- David James Reid Strang, QPM, Lately HM Chief Inspector of Prisons for Scotland. For services to Law and Order.
- Matthew Taylor, Chair, Review of Modern Employment and Chief Executive, Royal Society for the Encouragement of Arts, Manufactures and Commerce. For services to Employee Rights.
- William Russell Thomson, Lately Commissioner for Ethical Standards in Public Life in Scotland. For services to the Scottish Public Sector.
- Lesley Jane Titcomb, Lately Chief Executive, The Pensions Regulator. For services to Pensions Regulation.
- Joanna Trollope, OBE, Author. For services to Literature.
- Rachel Turner, Director, Economic Development, Department for International Development. For services to International Development.
- Derek Vaughan, MEP, Member of the European Parliament for Wales. For political and public service.
- Professor Anna Frances Vignoles, FBA, Professor of Education, Faculty of Education, University of Cambridge. For services to Social Sciences.
- Richard Wayne Vince, Executive Director, Long Term and High Security Estate, Ministry of Justice. For services to Her Majesty's Prison and Probation Service.
- Timothy Lillington Philip Warren, Lately Leader, Bath and North East Somerset Council. For services to Local Government and the community in Somerset.
- Professor Robert Richard Welbury, Professor of Paediatric Dentistry, UCLAN Dental School. For services to Paediatric Dentistry, Dental Education and Safeguarding of Children.
- Terence William Whittles, National Chairman, The Royal British Legion. For voluntary service to the Armed Forces.
- Eric Roy Wilson, Executive Director, Corporate Services, Competition and Markets Authority. For services to Competition.
- Sophie Mary Wilson, FRS, FREng, Director of Integrated Circuit Design, Broadcom Europe Ltd. For services to Computing.
- Dr. Kathryn Louise Wood, Director of Science, Research and Evidence, Department of Health and Social Care. For services to Health Research.

==== Officer of the Order of the British Empire (OBE) ====
Civil

- Dr. Nneka Abulokwe – chief executive officer, Micromax Consulting. For services to Business.
- Professor Malcolm Russell Airs – Lately Director, Kellogg College, Oxford. For services to the Historic Environment, Conservation and Education.
- Cherry Alexander MBE – Major Events Director, British Athletics. For services to Elite Sport.
- Nimco Ali – For services to Tackling Female Genital Mutilation and Gender Inequality.
- Anthony Allcock MBE – Chief Executive, Bowls England. For services to Lawn Bowls.
- Jacqueline Gay Alway (Jacqueline Tarpey) – chair, Music Publishers Association (UK). For services to the Music Industry.
- Professor Catherine Amanda Amos – Professor of Health Promotion, University of Edinburgh. For services to Public Health.
- Colleen Althea Amos (Colleen Amos-Zwambila) – Chief Executive, The Amos Bursary. For services to Community Cohesion.
- Dr. Mike Mehrdad Ashmead – Managing Director, Encocam. For services to Exports and Innovation in Engineering.
- Professor Timothy Atkins – Senior Technical Fellow, Defence Science and Technology Laboratory. For public service.
- Sarah Jane Bailey – Lately Head, Resourcing and Workforce Planning, Crown Prosecution Service. For services to Law and Order.
- Professor Caroline Mary Barron – For services to Education.
- Brendan John Bayley – Head, Policy Analysis Climate Energy and Agriculture Branch, HM Treasury. For public service.
- Charles Francis Houghton Beckford – Director, Foreign and Commonwealth Office. For services to national security.
- Dr. René Arthur Beguelin – General Practitioner, Gibraltar. For services to health in Gibraltar.
- Carol Ann Bell – Lately Executive Director, Great Exhibition of the North. For services to the Arts.
- George Bell – chairman, Bell Group UK. For services to Apprenticeships and Charity Fundraising.
- Maureen Bell – Lately Nurse Consultant for Vulnerable Children, NHS Ayrshire and Arran. For services to Child Protection.
- Margaret Elizabeth Berry – Executive Director for Europe, WEConnect International and Founder, Women in Technology Network. For services to Women in Business and Technology.
- Professor Michael Webster Bevan FRS – Deputy Director, John Innes Centre. For services to Plant Genomics.
- Dr. James Little Beveridge – Master Blender, Johnnie Walker, Diageo. For services to the Scotch Whisky Industry.
- Harjit Singh Bhania – Wheelchair Basketball Coach. For services to Wheelchair Basketball.
- David George Thomas Bloomer – For services to Women's Health.
- Dr. Jennifer Blunden – chief executive officer, Truro and Penwith Academy Trust. For services to Education.
- Alfred Giovanni Roncalli Boe – Musical Performer and Actor. For services to music and charity.
- Maria Bota – Creative Producer, Great Exhibition of the North. For services to the Arts.
- Katy Elizabeth Bourne – Police and Crime Commissioner for Sussex. For public and political service.
- Christopher Brammer – Deputy Director, Business Change and Implementation, Satellite Tracking Services, Immigration Enforcement, Home Office. For public service.
- Theresa Rose Breslin – Author. For services to Literature.
- Richard Campbell Brickley MBE – For services to Disability Sport.
- Professor Sarah Jean Broadie FBA, FRSE – Professor of Moral Philosophy, Wardlaw Professor, St Andrews University. For services to Classical Philosophy.
- Dr. Jane Louise Brooke-Smith – UK Head of Development and Strategic Planning, Arcadis LLP. For services to the Built Environment and Diversity and Inclusion.
- Sherry Melanie June Burrows – Team Leader, Foreign and Commonwealth Office. For services to national security and serious crime.
- Janice Elizabeth Cahill – For services to the Education of Vulnerable Young Learners and Child and Adolescent Mental Health in Stockport.
- David Campbell – For voluntary service to Athletics.
- James Campbell – Treasurer, Scottish Benevolent Fund. For services to the Department for Work and Pensions Staff in Scotland.
- David Carney-Haworth – Co-founder, Operation Encompass. For services to Children affected by Domestic Abuse.
- Elisabeth Anne Carney-Haworth – Co-founder, Operation Encompass. For services to Children affected by Domestic Abuse.
- Francis Clive Carreras – former Commissioner of Income Tax, Gibraltar. For services to Gibraltar.
- Dr. June Elizabeth Chatfield – Naturalist. For services to Conservation and Natural History Education.
- Amarjit Kaur Cheema – chief executive officer, Perry Hall Multi-Academy Trust. For services to Education in the West Midlands.
- Peter David Clarke – Lately Assistant Director, Border Force, Home Office. For services to Border Security.
- Professor Hannah Louise Cloke (Hannah Pappenberger) – Professor of Hydrology, University of Reading. For services to Flood Forecasting and the Development of Hazard Early Warning Systems.
- Captain David Charles Cole MVO RM (Rt'd) – Director of Music, The Royal British Legion. For services to Music and to Remembrance.
- Dr. Paul Collier – Head of Beams Department, CERN, Switzerland. For services to science and technology.
- Anne Galbraith Cook – Head, Social Housing Services Team, Better Homes Division, Scottish Government. For services to Social Housing.
- Elvis Costello – Musician. For services to Music.
- Alistair Robert Cunningham – Executive Director, Wiltshire Council. For services to the community in Wiltshire.
- Joni Cunningham – For services to Adult Community Learning in London and Essex.
- Father Brian D'Arcy – For services to Cross Community Relations.
- Tonia Dawson – Macmillan Clinical Lead, East of England Cancer Alliance. For services to Nursing and People affected by Cancer.
- Ptolemy Hugo Dean – For services to Heritage and Design.
- Sandra Caroline Dinneen – Chief Executive, South Norfolk Council. For services to Local Government.
- Brian Donald – lately Chief of Staff, Europol, The Hague, The Netherlands. For services to policing and justice
- Edward Frederic Colin Donaldson – Treasurer, Royal National Lifeboat Institution. For voluntary service.
- Dr. Christopher Dorman – Vice President, Coherent Scotland. For services to Laser and Photonic Technology and Exports.
- Jill Downing – Solicitor. For services to Children and Families and to voluntary work in the community in Northern Ireland.
- Derek James Doyle MBE – lately British Consul and Director of Trade and Investment, Bilbao, Spain. For services to UK/Spain relations.
- Brian James Duffin – Non-Executive Director, Debt Management Office. For services to the UK Pensions Industry.
- Gillian Dunion (Gillian Docherty) – Chief Executive, The Data Lab. For services to Information Technology and Business.
- Edwina Dunn (Edwina Humby) – chief executive officer, Starcount. For services to Data and Business in the UK.
- Arnab Dutt – For services to Small and Medium-sized Businesses, Diversity and Equality.
- Jane Edmondson – Director, East and Central Africa, Department for International Development. For services to International Development.
- Professor Judith Mary Ellis MBE – Chair of Trustees, Tropical Health and Education Trust and lately Chief Executive, Royal College of Paediatrics and Child Health. For services to Healthcare.
- Brenda Emmanus – Broadcaster and Journalist. For services to Broadcasting and Diversity.
- Barbara Ann Farndell – Policy Expert, HM Revenue and Customs. For services to Taxpayers.
- Malcolm William Rusk (Callum) Farquhar – Regional Commissioner, East Scotland Region, Scouts. For services to the Scouting Movement.
- Andrew Paul Ferguson – For services to the Economy and Broadband Services in the UK.
- Janet Natasha Finlayson – For services to Children and Families.
- Katherine Iona Fisher – Deputy Director, HM Treasury. For public service.
- Kelly Fisher – B2, Ministry of Defence. For services to Defence.
- Eithne Patricia Fitzmaurice – Deputy Director, Criminal and Financial Investigation, Immigration Enforcement, Home Office. For public service.
- Professor Kevin Jeremy Fong – Consultant Anaesthetist, University College London Hospitals NHS Foundation Trust. For services to Medicine and Healthcare.
- Geoffrey David Forder – Lately Deputy Head, QEC Support, Defence Equipment and Support, Ministry of Defence. For services to Naval Logistic Support.
- Alastair David William Fothergill – Director, Silverback Films. For services to Film.
- Sarah Jane Friar – lately Chief Financial Officer, Square Inc, USA. For services to entrepreneurship and financial services
- Dr. Ian James Macaulay Frood – For services to the British Cattle Industry.
- Councillor John Fuller – For public and political service.
- Dr. Mark John Fulop – Programme Leader, Chemical Biological and Radiological Division, Defence Science and Technology Laboratory. For public service.
- Professor Tamara Susan Galloway – Professor of Ecotoxicology, University of Exeter. For services to Environmental Science.
- William Geddes – Inspector, Her Majesty's Inspectorate of Education. For services to Education.
- James Robert Gerard – Deputy Director, Head of Parliamentary Team, Department for Exiting the EU. For public service.
- Dr. Delna Ghandhi – Lately Health Adviser, Department for International Development. For services to Tackling Tropical Disease.
- William Roy Gibaud – lately First Secretary Defence and Security, British High Commission, Canberra, Australia. For services to international trade
- John Mark Gibson – Founding Trustee, Dumfries House and Founder and Trustee, Scottish Dark Sky Observatory. For services to Heritage.
- Steven John Gilbert – Vice Chair, Independent Review of the Mental Health Act and Member, Board of Trustees, Mind. For services to Mental Health.
- Simon Maxwell Gillespie – Chief Executive, British Heart Foundation. For services to Patients and Medical Research.
- Ian Rory Ginsberg – Deputy Director, European Finances Team, HM Treasury. For public service.
- Arvinda Gohil – chief executive officer, Community Links. For services to the community and Housing for Vulnerable People.
- Robert George Anderson Gourlay – For services to the Scottish Food and Drink Industry.
- Irene Rudge Graham – Chief Executive, Scale-Up Institute. For services to Business and the Economy.
- Joanna Marie Greenidge – Deputy Director, Government Legal Department. For services to Government Law.
- Stuart Cameron Griffiths – Deputy Director, Department for Work and Pensions. For public service.
- Barry Kole Grossman – Director Trade and Investment, British Embassy, Tel Aviv, Israel. For services to UK/Israel commercial relations
- Edward Michael (Bear) Grylls – Chief Scout. For services to Young People, the Media and charity.
- Sajid Gulzar – chief executive officer, Prince Albert Community Trust. For services to Education.
- Poppy Gustafsson – Co-founder and Co-Chief Executive Officer, Darktrace. For services to the Cyber Security Industry.
- Mark Kieron Hamilton – Assistant Chief Constable, Police Service of Northern Ireland. For services to Policing and the community in Northern Ireland.
- Paul David Roger Hancock QFSM – Lately Chief Fire Officer, Cheshire Fire and Rescue Service. For services to Fire and Rescue.
- Felicity Harding – Ambassador and Special Adviser to the Chief Executive, Samaritans. For charitable services.
- Andrew Harries – For services to Film and Television.
- Kathryn Gwynne Harries – Lately Director, National Opera Studio. For services to Opera.
- Professor Susan Elaine Hartley (Susan Grimley) – Director, York Environmental Sustainability Institute. For services to Ecological Research and Public Engagement
- Dominic Newton Haslam – Director, Sightsavers. For services to People with Disabilities.
- Sacha Amin Hatteea – Deputy Director, Public and Parliamentary Delivery. Department for Transport. For services to Aviation.
- Gillian Valerie Haworth – Lately Chief Executive, Intercountry Adoption Centre. For services to Vulnerable Children and Families.
- Pablo Tudor Barraclough Hepworth Lloyd – chief executive officer and co-founder, Visionnaires. For services to WorldSkills UK.
- Professor Sarah Elizabeth Hewlett – Emerita Professor of Rheumatology Nursing, University of the West of England. For services to People with Arthritis and Nursing Research.
- Nigel Ralph Gore Hinds – Executive Producer, 14–18 NOW. For services to the Arts.
- Dr. Sharon Holmes – B2, Ministry of Defence. For services to Defence.
- Graham John Hooper – Financial Crime Prevention Consultant, Lloyds. For services to Tackling Financial Crime.
- Bettany Hughes – Historian, Author and Broadcaster. For services to History.
- Catherine Mary Therese Hughes – Lately Principal, St Bede's Catholic College, Bristol. For services to Education.
- Derek Joseph Hughes – Lately Deputy Director, Customer Services, HM Revenue and Customs. For services to Customer Service and Inclusion.
- Kenneth Hughes – Lately Assistant Chief Executive, Scottish Parliament. For parliamentary service.
- Clive Robert Humby – Chief Data Scientist, Starcount. For services to Data and Business in the UK.
- Professor Beverley Jane Hunt – Professor of Thrombosis and Haemostasis, King's College London and Consultant in Clinical Haematology, Guy's and St Thomas' NHS Foundation Trust. For services to Medicine
- Dr. Carl Stephen Patrick Hunter – chief executive officer, Coltraco Ultrasonics. For services to Business and International Trade.
- Leyla Hussein – For services to Tackling Female Genital Mutilation and Gender Inequality.
- David Graham Hutchinson – HM Inspector, Health and Safety Executive. For services to Offshore Diving Safety.
- Merlin Michael Hyman – Chief Executive, Regen. For services to the Sustainable Energy Sector.
- Josephine Ann James – Chief Executive, Kent Invicta Chamber of Commerce. For services to the Economy in Kent.
- Annwen Jones – Co-founder, Target Ovarian Cancer. For services to charity.
- David Jones – For services to Music and Culture.
- Cush Jumbo – Actress. For services to Drama.
- Maria Anne Kane – Chief Executive, North Middlesex University Hospital NHS Trust. For services to Leadership in Healthcare.
- Dr. Anna Keay – Director, Landmark Trust. For services to Heritage.
- Dr. Anne Catherine Kemp – chair, UK BIM Alliance. For services to Digital Construction Innovation.
- Sarah Louise Kenny – chief executive officer, BMT Group Ltd. For services to the Maritime Sector and Diversity.
- Qadeer Kiani – chair, Arhag Housing Association. For services to Migrants and Refugees.
- Anne Rochelle Kiem – Chief Executive, Chartered Association of Business Schools and executive director, Small Business Charter. For services to Small Businesses and Entrepreneurs.
- Barnaby James Kistruck – Lately Grade 6, Ministry of Defence. For public service.
- Narinder Kaur Kooner – Councillor, Birmingham City Council and Director, Sikh Women's Action Network. For services to Supporting Vulnerable People and to the community in the West Midlands.
- Professor Sudhesh Kumar – Dean, Warwick Medical School. For services to Medicine and to Diabetes Care.
- Arun Kumar Batra – chief executive officer, National Equality Standard. For services to Faith and Integration in the Public Sector.
- Professor Fred Frank Land – For services to the Information Systems Industry.
- Daniel John Langford – For services to Business.
- Robert Mark Last MBE – Deputy Head, Human Rights and Political Team, UK Mission to the United Nations, Geneva, Switzerland. For services to British foreign policy
- Jane Carol Lees – Lately Chair, Sex Education Forum Advisory Group. For services to Education.
- Rufus Alexander Legg – Head, Royal, Ceremonial and Honours Unit, Foreign and Commonwealth Office. For services to British foreign policy.
- Annmarie Lewis – Founder and Director, Rainmakers Worldwide. For services to Young People.
- Ursula Frances Rosamond Lidbetter MBE DL – Chief Executive, Lincolnshire Co-operative and chair, Greater Lincolnshire Local Enterprise Partnership. For services to the Economy.
- Joshua Llewellyn-Jones – For services to Cystic Fibrosis Awareness.
- Richard Lloyd – Lately Executive Director, Which? For services to the Economy and Consumer Rights.
- Siwan Lloyd Hayward – Director of Compliance Operations and Policing Services, Transport for London. For services to Transport and Policing.
- Oliver Martin Lovell – Team Leader, Foreign and Commonwealth Office. For services to national security.
- Richard Anthony Ludlow – chief executive officer, Ebor Academy Trust, York. For services to Education.
- Deborah Jane Lye – Chief Executive, Spirit of 2012. For services to Community Projects.
- Joseph Mackie – chairman, The Archie Foundation. For services to the community in Scotland.
- Jeannette Mackinney – chief executive officer, Hales Valley Trust. For services to Education.
- Phillip Gerard Maguire – For services to Prison Radio and Radio Production.
- Professor Lee Elliot Major – Lately Chief Executive Officer, Sutton Trust and Trustee, Education Endowment Foundation. For services to Social Mobility.
- Roger Howard Malbert – Lately Head, Hayward Gallery Touring. For services to Art.
- Dr. Stephen James Malcolm – Chief Environmental Science Adviser, Cefas. For services to the Marine Environment.
- Ann Margaret Marcer – Volunteer. For services to UK Aid and Young Women.
- Boyd Ernest McAdam – National Convener/Chief Executive, Children's Hearings Scotland. For services to Young People.
- Ann McDonald – Principal, Kellett School, The British International School in Hong Kong. For services to education and the British community in Hong Kong.
- Sheriff Iona Sara McDonald – Senior Sheriff, Kilmarnock Sheriff Court. For services to Law and Order.
- Anne Graham Brodie McEwan – former president, National Association of British Schools in Spain. For services to Education.
- Timothy James McDonnell – Head, International and Industrial Strategy, Ministry of Defence. For services to Defence.
- Dr. Jacqueline Ann McKenna MBE – Lately Director of Nursing, Professional Leadership, NHS Improvement. For services to Nursing.
- Amanda Jane McLoughlin – Head, Department for International Development, Lebanon. For services to Humanitarian Relief.
- Catherine Frances Mead DL – For services to Cheese Making and the community in the South West of England.
- Dr. Janet Christine Metcalfe – Head, Vitae. For services to Researcher Career Development.
- Professor Dorothy Evelyn Miell FRSE – Vice-Principal and Head, College of Arts, Humanities and Social Sciences, University of Edinburgh. For services to Higher Education and Psychology.
- Patricia Ann Cecilia Miller – Chief Executive, Dorset County Hospital NHS Foundation Trust. For services to the NHS.
- Dr. Julie Mary Mills – Principal and Chief Executive, Milton Keynes College. For services to Promoting Business and Education Links.
- Professor Shantashil Rajyeswar (Rana) Mitter – Professor, History and Politics of Modern China, University of Oxford. For services to Education.
- Peter Graham Anthony Morris – chairman, BAFTA Los Angeles, USA. For services to the British entertainment industry
- Paul Clifford Morrison QPM – Commissioner of Police, Anguilla. For services to Anguilla.
- Sheila Jean Morrow – For services to Hockey in Wales.
- Nicholas Moss JP – Magistrate and Bench Chair, North and East Hertfordshire Bench. For services to the Administration of Justice.
- Vickie Tyler Mottram (Roberts) – Head of Apprenticeships, HM Revenue and Customs. For services to Apprentices.
- Sally Elizabeth Munday MBE – For services to Hockey.
- Joseph Christopher Musgrave – chief executive officer and Director, Wynyard Park Ltd. For services to Business and the community in the Tees Valley.
- Lucy Ellen Musgrave – For services to Architecture and the Built Environment.
- Dr. Dwain Anthony Neil – For services to the British African Caribbean community.
- Elaine Susan Newell – Lately Chief Nurse, Sandwell and West Birmingham Hospitals NHS Trust. For services to Midwifery.
- Professor Michael James Norton Freng – For services to Engineering and the Digital Economy.
- Robert Ormsby – Special, National Crime Agency. For services to Law Enforcement.
- Dr. Jane Katharine Osbourn – Vice President for Research and Development, MedImmune Biotechnology and chair, UK Bioindustry Association. For services to Drug Research and Development.
- Richard Ovenden – Librarian, Bodleian Library. For services to Libraries and Archives.
- Catherine Ellen Page – Lately Private Secretary, Cabinet Office. For public service.
- Manmeet Singh Panesar – Head of Technical Services, Office for Product Safety and Standards, Department for Business, Energy and Industrial Strategy. For services to Product Safety.
- Miles Parkinson – For political service.
- Professor Mahesh Parmar – Professor of Medical Statistics and Epidemiology and Director, MRC Clinical Trials Unit, University College London. For services to Medical Research and Clinical Trials.
- David Warren Parr – Chief Executive, Halton Borough Council. For services to Local Government in Cheshire.
- Janet Lynn Paterson MBE – Lately Director of Olympic Relations, British Olympic Association and Chief Executive, British Olympic Foundation. For services to Olympic Sport.
- Robert Ralston Paterson – lately Counsellor, British Embassy, Kabul, Afghanistan. For services to national security.
- Robert Charles Pepper MBE – For services to Music.
- Nicola Sian Pittam – Senior Lawyer, Statutory Instrument Hub, HM Treasury. For public service.
- Beverley Pollard (Beverley Andrus Humphrey) – Lately Chief Executive, Greater Manchester Mental Health NHS Foundation Trust. For services to Mental Health and Care.
- Rubeela Naveed Qayyum – Treasury Accountant and Head of Exchequer Funds and Accounts, HM Treasury. For services to Taxpayers, Young People and Social Inclusion.
- Reena Ranger (Reena Ahuja) – Founder and chair, Women Empowered. For services to BAME Women.
- Suzanne Rastrick – Chief Allied Health Professions Officer, NHS England. For services to Allied Health Professionals.
- Dr. Sarah Marcel Redwood – Deputy Director, European Programmes, Department for Business, Energy and Industrial Strategy. For services to Science and Innovation Funding.
- Julie Reene – Assistant Director, Specialist Operations, Border Force, Home Office. For services to Border Security.
- Griffith Rhys Jones – For services to the National Civic Society Movement, charity and Entertainment.
- Cynthia Ann Robinson – For voluntary service to Older People.
- Mark Raymond Rogers – Area Manager, Defence Science and Technology Laboratory. For public service.
- Linda Dawn Rose – Accountability Team Leader, Inspections and Accountability Quality Team, Department for Education. For services to Education.
- Ralph Rugoff – Director, Hayward Gallery. For services to Art.
- Petra Salva – Director of Services (Rough Sleeper, Ex-Offenders and Migrant Services), St Mungo's Community Housing Association. For services to Homeless People.
- Elizabeth Ann Sclater – For services to Older Women.
- John Maclean Scott – lately Global Deputy Chairman, KPMG International. For services to UK/Spain relations
- Sean Feargal Sharkey – For services to Music.
- Andrew Leo Sharp – For political service.
- Nicola Shindler – Founder, Red Production Company. For services to Broadcasting.
- Sarah Alexandra Smith – Deputy Director, Office for Product Safety and Standards, Department for Business, Energy and Industrial Strategy. For services to Business and Consumers.
- Thomas Harvey Spiller – President, National Conservative Convention. For public and political service.
- Catherine Dalling Taylor Stihler – For political service.
- Jack Benjamin Stockdale – Chief Technology Officer, Darktrace. For services to the Cyber Security Industry.
- Dr. Sarah Jane Stubbs – Analytical Chemist, Defence Science and Technology Laboratory. For public service.
- Gavin Douglas Thomas – Lately Chief Superintendent, Gloucestershire Constabulary and President, Police Superintendents' Association. For services to Policing.
- Professor Geraldine Anne Thomas – Professor of Molecular Pathology, Imperial College, London. For services to Science and Public Health.
- Dr. Rhian-Mari Thomas – chief executive officer, Green Finance Institute and lately chair, Barclays Green Banking Council and Global Head Barclays Green Banking. For services to Green Banking.
- Dr. Robert Campbell Kennedy Thomson – Principal and Chief Executive, Forth Valley College. For services to Education, Economic Development and the community across Forth Valley.
- Robin Ticciati – Principal Conductor, Scottish Chamber Orchestra. For services to Music.
- Sarah Louise Treseder – Chief Executive, Royal Yachting Association. For services to Sport.
- Rosie Louise Tressler – chief executive officer, Student Minds. For services to Mental Health in Higher Education.
- Julie Anne Uzupris – Strategic Threats Team, UK Joint Delegation to NATO, Brussels, Belgium. For services to national security
- Dr. Pamela Jane Waddell – Director, Innovation Alliance for the West Midlands. For services to Innovation in the West Midlands.
- David Paul Wagstaff – Deputy Director, Euratom International Negotiations, Department for Business, Energy and Industrial Strategy. For services to Energy and Climate Change Policy.
- Christine Wain – Headteacher, Pallister Park Primary School. For services to Education.
- Dr. Christopher Geoffrey Wakeling – chairman, Historic England's Places of Worship Forum. For services to Heritage.
- Nigel Keith Walker – National Director, English Institute of Sport. For services to Elite Sport.
- Sarah Ann Waters – Author. For services to Literature.
- Professor Alison Watson (Alison Macmillan) – Professor of International Relations, University of St Andrews. For services to Education.
- Sonia Maxine Watson (Sonia Bromfield) – For services to Diversity in Architecture.
- Glenda Margaret Watt – Co-ordinator, Scottish Older People's Assembly. For services to Older People.
- Robin Geoffrey Wilkinson – Chief of Corporate Services, Metropolitan Police Service. For services to Policing.
- Richard Ian Williams – Chief Executive, Northern Ireland Screen. For services to the Screen Industries in Northern Ireland.
- Simon Peter Williams – Country Director, British Council, Kyiv, Ukraine. For services to UK cultural relations.
- Professor Graham Wren FREng – Special Adviser to the Principal, Strathclyde University. For services to Education, Science and Engineering.
- Henrietta Mackay Wright – Service Leader, Central Scotland District, Department for Work and Pensions. For services to Vulnerable Customers in Scotland.
- Alan Roy Yates – Deputy Chief Executive, Accord Housing Association. For services to Housing.
- Karl Andrew Young – Senior Lawyer, HM Revenue and Customs. For services to Taxpayers.

Military

- Commodore Stephen Michael Allen, Royal Navy
- Lieutenant Colonel Simon Leslie Blake, The Royal Logistic Corps, Army Reserve
- Commander Richard Charles Bone, Royal Navy
- Colonel Jo Butterfill, MC
- Wing Commander Mark Christopher Butterworth, Royal Air Force
- Group Captain Joanne Lorraine Campbell, Royal Air Force
- Group Captain Ian Derek Cheswoth, Royal Air Force
- Commander (Acting Captain) Christopher John Connolly, Royal Navy
- Group Captain Jason Clarke Davies, Royal Air Force,
- Lieutenant Colonel Thomas William Day, Royal Corps of Signals
- Commander Steven Ronald Drysdale, Royal Navy
- Lieutenant Colonel Rupert Spark Evetts, MBE, The Blues and Royals (Royal Horse Guards and 1st Dragoons)
- Commodore Rupert Patrick Hollins, Royal Navy – former Defence Attache (China)
- Colonel Joseph Edward Fossey
- Commander Martin John Freeman, Royal Navy
- Lieutenant Colonel Philip Simon James Heppell, Royal Army Medical Corps
- Lieutenant Colonel Brian Keith Howard, The Royal Logistic Corps
- Wing Commander Edwin Sebastian Kendall, Royal Air Force
- Lieutenant Colonel Simon Nicholas Meadowcroft, BEM, Royal Corps of Signals
- Wing Commander Jennifer Robinson, Royal Air Force
- Colonel Edward Dixon Sandry
- Wing Commander James Richard Simmonds, Royal Air Force
- Colonel Anthony Tait
- Lieutenant Colonel Neil Kirkby Gow Tomlin, The Royal Regiment of Scotland

==== Member of the Order of the British Empire (MBE) ====
Civil

- Viviane Hooper Adamson – For voluntary service to the Credit Union Movement and the community in Newry and Banbridge.
- Veronica Anne Judith Adlam – Health and Safety Manager, Hertfordshire Fire and Rescue Service. For services to Firefighter Safety.
- Ama Agbeze – Captain, England Women's Netball Team. For services to Netball.
- Olasubomi Iginla Aina – chief executive officer/Executive Director, Lightup Foundation (Nigeria and United Kingdom). For services to Young People and the Underprivileged.
- Marianne Ainsworth-Smith – Bill Manager, Department for Exiting the EU. For public service.
- Dr. Giuseppe Vito Albano – Curator, Keats-Shelley House, Rome, Italy. For services to UK/Italy relations.
- Paul Alger – Director, International Business Development, UK Fashion and Textile Association. For services to Exports in the UK Fashion Industry.
- Clair Alleebux – Human Resources Business Partner, Department for Environment, Food and Rural Affairs. For charitable services.
- Yasemin Allsop – For services to Education and Children and Families from Disadvantaged Backgrounds.
- Bridgette Anderson – Conciliation Officer, ACAS. For services to Employee Rights and Disability Awareness.
- John Ankers JP – For services to Young People and the Magistracy Service.
- Joshua Kwabena Apeadu-Siaw – For services to the Law, UK Legal Services and to Young People.
- Paul Michael Appleby – For services to the Creative Industries in Bristol and Bath.
- George Peter Apter – For public and political service.
- Bryan Mckend Armstrong – For services to Journalism and the community in Scotland.
- Gillian Mary Arthur – Lately Member, Export Guarantees Advisory Council. For services to the British Export Economy.
- Mathangi Arulpragasam – For services to Music.
- Jeremy Peter Ash – For services to Women and Girls and International Development.
- Sheila Atim – For services to Drama.
- Jessica Lucy Baker – For services to Global Supply Chains.
- Councillor Keith James Baker – For public and political service.
- Karen Ball – Head, Midlands Engine Investment Hub, Department for International Trade. For services to Trade and Investment.
- Dr. Pamela Margaret Ball – President, League of Hospital Friends, Kidderminster Hospital. For services to Charitable Fundraising in the NHS.
- Susan Gail Ball – For services to Libraries.
- Martin Ballard – Head Concierge, Claridge's. For services to the hotel, Tourism and Hospitality Industry.
- Anne Elizabeth Barclay – Operational Director, Wigtown Festival Company and chair, Dumfries and Galloway Relay for Life Committee. For services to the Arts and charity.
- Anna Rose Barker – Lately Chair, British Youth Council. For services to Young People.
- David Michael Barlow – For services to Apprenticeships and Business.
- Robert Barrow DL – For services to charity and the community in Macclesfield, Cheshire.
- Amrik Singh Basi – Amateur Boxing Referee. For services to Boxing.
- Daniel Oliver Bates – Manager, Research and Development, National Crime Agency. For services to Law Enforcement.
- Professor Antony James Bayer – Professor of Geriatric Medicine and Director, Memory Assessment Service, Cardiff and Vale University Health Board. For services to Healthcare.
- Bridget Bennett – Service Manager, Early Years and Family Support, East Riding of Yorkshire Council. For services to Children and Families.
- Hon Michael D'arcy Benson – For services to York Minster.
- Professor Richard Arthur Betts – Head of Climate Impacts Research, Met Office Hadley Centre and chair in Climate Impacts, University of Exeter. For services to Understanding Climate Change.
- Mary Cecilia Bevan – Soprano. For services to Music.
- Sophie Anna Magdalena Bevan – Soprano. For services to Music.
- Rashid Bhayat – Founder, Positive Youth Foundation. For services to Young People in the Midlands.
- Dr. Ashok Kumar Bhuvanagiri – Founder, The Telugu Association of Scotland. For services to Cultural Cohesion and charity.
- Eileen Biddlecombe – For services to Children and Families in Plymouth.
- Roger Biddlecombe – For services to Children and Families in Plymouth.
- James Valentine Bisset – For services to the community in North West England.
- Arnold Julian Sheldon Black – Historian and Statistician, Scottish Athletics. For services to Athletics.
- Professor Lynne Boddy – For services to Mycology and Public Engagement in Science.
- Emma Pauline Bond – For services to Policing and the community in Northern Ireland.
- Professor James Robert Bonham – Director, Pharmacy, Diagnostics and Genetics, Sheffield Children's NHS Foundation Trust. For services to Young People with Genetic Metabolic Diseases.
- Lorna Elizabeth Booth – Foster Carer, Lincolnshire County Council. For services to Children in Lincolnshire.
- Stephen Peter Booth – Foster Carer, Lincolnshire County Council. For services to Children in Lincolnshire.
- Barbara Ama Ansah Panfu Bray – Nutritionist. For services to Food Nutrition.
- Caroline Breen Cooksley – Development Director, Associated Community Training Ltd. For services to Education.
- Charles Ernest Brown – National Chairman, Royal British Legion Scotland. For voluntary service to Veterans in Scotland.
- Kenneth John Brown – For services to Sport and Broadcasting.
- Rosemary Brown – Team Manager, Shared Lives Scheme. For services to Healthcare in South East Wales.
- Andrew Bryant – C1, Ministry of Defence. For services to Defence.
- Janis Margaret Burdin – Head Teacher, Moss Side Community Primary School, Leyland, Lancashire. For services to Education.
- Sarah Penelope Burns – For services to Disadvantaged Women.
- Eve Alexandra Burt – For public and political service.
- Karen Buse – Managing Director, European Relations, BMI. For services to Music.
- Sally Anne Buttifant – For services to the Railway and the community in Cheshire.
- Elizabeth Jane Buttigieg – Executive Officer, UK Statistics Authority. For services to Pensioners, Veterans and the community in Newport, Wales.
- Gary Roy Byfield – Inspector, Metropolitan Police Service. For services to Families of Police Officers Killed in the Line of Duty.
- Professor Gerard John Byrne – Director of Education and Quality, Health Education England (North). For services to UK and Global Health Education.
- Michael Adrien (Ben) Byrom – For services to Flood Resilience and the community in Braunton, Devon.
- Gerrard Campbell – Trustee, The Sharan Project and Founder, Big Brother Movement. For services to Crime Prevention and the Elimination of Violence Against Women and Girls.
- Lorraine Katrina Campbell – Registered Intermediary, Ministry of Justice. For services to Young Victims and Witnesses.
- Julie Carlton – Seafarer Safety and Health Manager, Maritime and Coastguard Agency, Department for Transport. For services to Maritime Safety.
- John Casson – For services to charity.
- Christopher William Cavey – Open Learning Manager, British Council. For services to UK cultural relations.
- Shibu Chacko – Specialist Nurse, NHS Blood and Transplant and Community Volunteer. For services to the NHS.
- Sheila Chambers – Founder, Around Noon. For services to the Economy and to the community in Newry.
- Shireen Chambers – For services to Forestry.
- Dr. Navnit Singh Chana – Lately Chairman, National Association of Primary Care and General Practitioner, Cricket Green Medical Practice. For services to Clinical Education and Primary and Community Care
- Dr. Gulbash Singh Chandok – Senior Partner, Guru Nanak Medical Centre. For services to General Practice.
- Dr. Sengottiyan Chandrasekaran (Dr Chandra) – Medical Lead, General Adult Critical Care. For services to the community in Manchester.
- John Chapman – For services to Children with Severe Learning Difficulties.
- Jennifer Dorothy Charles – Magistrate, Supplemental List. For services to the Administration of Justice and the community in Hampshire.
- Cara Ann Charles-Barks – Chief Executive, Salisbury NHS Foundation Trust. For services to the NHS.
- Courtney Gary Stempel Chatburn – Head Coach, Under 17 Panamanian National Football Team. For services to youth and sport in Panama
- Janet Lynda Cheek – former Member of the Falkland Islands Legislative Assembly. For services to the Falkland Islands
- Ceinwen Jean Church – For services to Business.
- Rita Ciccu Moore – Deputy Director of Nursing, NHS Forth Valley. For services to Nursing and the NHS Forth Valley Nurses Choir.
- Darren Harkins Clark – For services to Tackling HIV/AIDS.
- Gwyneira Rose Clark – Lately Councillor. For services to Local Government, Housing and the community in Garndiffaith, Torfaen.
- Jacqueline Ida Clarke – Executive Assistant, Ministry of Defence. For services to Defence.
- Dr. Keith Clarkson – For services to Wildlife Conservation.
- Kyle James Coetzer – For services to Cricket.
- Ben Coffman – For parliamentary and political service.
- Raymond Colbourne – Team Leader, Planning Casework Unit, Ministry of Housing, Communities and Local Government. For public service.
- Robert James Collister – For services to Mountaineering and Conservation.
- Anthony Joseph Convery – Founder and chairman, CDE Group. For services to the Northern Ireland Economy.
- Andrew Smith Cooke – For services to Badminton.
- Lesley Yvonne Wendy Coomer – Lately Chair, Together Trust. For services to Young People and the community in Cheshire.
- Janette Cooper – Co-founder, volunteer, board member and lately chair, Berkshire Women's Aid. For services to Women's Refuge and those affected by Domestic Violence.
- Professor Jane Kennedy Core JP – Lately Director of Student and Library Services, Northumbria University. For services to Higher Education.
- Richard Wykeham Cornwallis – former Secretary to the Council of Trustees, British International School, Jakarta, Indonesia and former Honorary Legal Adviser to the British Embassy, Jakarta, Indonesia. For services to UK/Indonesia relations Gabrielle Anne COSTIGAN, Chief Executive, BAE Systems Australia. For services to UK/Australia relations
- Katharine Alison Costelloe – Assistant Head, Operations Directorate, Ministry of Defence. For services to Defence.
- Dr Diane Crann (Diane Davies) – Founder, Engineering Masterclass Programme, Royal Institution. For services to Engineering Education.
- Colin Michael Crowe – Lately Senior Officer, Border Force, Home Office. For services to Border Security.
- Ian William Crowe DL – For services to the community and to the Northern Ireland Air Ambulance.
- William John Dallimore – For services to Target Shooting.
- Nicola Daniels – For services to the community in South Shropshire.
- Jacqueline Caryl Dankworth – Recording Artist, Actress and Singer. For services to Music.
- Anita Elizabeth Darlison – Consultant Nurse, University Hospitals of Leicester NHS Trust and Head of Services, Mesothelioma UK. For services to Cancer Research and Patients.
- Donald Ewen Dugald Macinnes Darroch – Special Constable, Police Scotland. For services to Law and Order on the Isle of Jura, Inner Hebrides.
- Jacqueline Davidson – Founder and Director, Jackie Davidson Management. For services to Music.
- Gerallt Bowen Davies – National Operations Officer Wales, St John Ambulance. For services to First Aid provision in Wales.
- Kathryn Davies – Assistant Director, HM Revenue and Customs. For services to the Investigation of Organised Crime.
- Richard Craig Davies – HM Cutter Commander, Border Force. For services to Border Security.
- William Gareth Davies – For services to the community in Merthyr Tydfil.
- Mary Fleur De Rhé-Philipe – For services to Local Government and the community in Wiltshire.
- Janette Dewsbury – Foster Carer, Redcar and Cleveland Borough Council. For services to Fostering.
- Neil Dewsbury – Foster Carer, Redcar and Cleveland Borough Council. For services to Fostering.
- Margaret Jessie Mcfarlane Dixon – For services to the Administration of Justice and for voluntary service in the UK and Abroad.
- Sara Kim Donald – For public and political service.
- Gillian Donaldson – former fencer and Olympic Gold Medallist. For services to UK sport
- Colin Dorrance – Lately Sergeant, Police Scotland. For services to Law and Order, the Remembrance of Pan Am Flight 103 and charity.
- Faith Douglas – For services to Charitable Fundraising.
- Matthew Downie – Director of Policy and External Affairs, Crisis. For services to Tackling Homelessness.
- Sonja Meryl Drew – Deputy Head of Senior Staff, Human Resources, Department for Business, Energy and Industrial Strategy. For public and charitable services.
- Alexander Peter Duguid – For services to Deaf People and British Sign Language Education.
- Martyn Dunsford – Director, Care and Relief for the Young. For services to Disadvantaged Children and Young People.
- Julie Ann Dyer – For services to Young People with Special Educational Needs.
- Laura Murray Dyer – Deputy Chief Executive, Arts Council England. For services to the Arts.
- Marlene Dylys Dyke – For services to Culture in Barnsley.
- Malcolm East – First Aid Trainer, Welsh Government. For services to First Aid and the community in Llandrindod Wells.
- Naghmeh Ebanks-Beni – Commercial Director, Prima Cheese. For services to International Trade.
- Jane Elizabeth Ebel – Manager, UK-Moldova Projects, Chisinau, Republic of Moldova. For services to disabled children and adults in the Republic of Moldova
- Gillian Elaine Edge-Evans – For services to Education.
- Georgina Elizabeth Edwards – Founder and Director, Norfolk Community Law Service. For services to the community in Norfolk.
- Spyros Petros Elia – Chair of Governors, Brindishe Federation, London Borough of Lewisham. For services to Education.
- Kathryn Denise Ellaway – Lately Designated Nurse Safeguarding, National Safeguarding Team. For services to Safeguarding in Wales.
- Simon Bryan Ellis – Head of Crisis Management, British Council. For services to security and the British Council
- Clive Robert Emson – For services to Vulnerable and Disadvantaged Young People in Kent.
- Raymond Vincent Ennis – For services to Music.
- Pamela Christine Evans – Founder and Director, Peace Mala. For services to the Promotion of Peace and Interfaith Understanding.
- Thomas Alfred Evans – For services to Farming Heritage.
- Clive Harold Everton – Broadcaster and Journalist. For services to Snooker.
- Paul Martin John Farrell – Assistant Director, Border Force, Home Office. For services to Border Security.
- Dr. Mohammad Farsi – Founder, CANopen Protocol. For services to the Automotive Industry, Education and Cultural Engagement.
- Eileen Fenton – For voluntary service to Long Distance and Competitive Swimming Coaching in Yorkshire and Great Britain.
- David Michael Fergusson – Scientist, Defence Science and Technology Laboratory. For services to Defence and to Aviation Safety.
- Suzanne Fernando – For services to Cervical Cancer, Autism and Military Veterans in Ayrshire.
- Teresa May Filkins – Lead Worker, Thames Reach Charity. For services to Homeless People.
- Jim Findlay – For services to the community in Hollingbourne, Kent.
- Joseph Guy Fisher – former Second Secretary, British Embassy, Rangoon, Myanmar. For services to British foreign policy
- Joanna Louise Fitch – Senior Policy Adviser, Cabinet Office. For public service.
- Michael Oliver Flavin – Review Team Manager. Bedfordshire, Cambridgeshire and Hertfordshire Joint Protective Services Major Crime Unit. For services to Policing.
- Jewelle Yvonne Fleming – Clerk to the Executive Council, Anguilla. For services to public service in Anguilla.
- Peter John Floyd – For services to the community in Bristol.
- Margaret Jean Foster – For services to Fostering in Staffordshire.
- William Ernest Henry Foster – For services to Fostering in Staffordshire.
- Keith Harrison Fowler – For charitable services.
- Michael John France – For services to Mountain Rescue.
- Victoria Lynette Garcia – Accessibility and Communities Manager, Brighton and Hove Buses. For services to Disabled Transport Users.
- Professor Jason Otto Gardosi – Director, Perinatal Institute. For services to Maternal and Infant Health.
- Dr. Jacqueline Ann Gerrard – Lately Director, The Royal College of Midwives. For services to Women and Midwifery.
- Rosie Chaar Ghazal – Personal Assistant to the Defence Attaché, British Embassy, Beirut, Lebanon. For services to Lebanese veterans who served in the British Armed Forces
- Major (Retd) William John Gillett – Support Officer, Blesma, Military Charity for Limbless Veterans. For services to Veterans.
- Thomas Louis Gilzean BEM – For services to Charitable Fundraising in Edinburgh.
- Dr. Isabel Ann Glen – For services to Education, Railway Heritage and the community in Airdrie.
- George Scott Glynn – Founder, Walk with Scott Foundation. For services to Health and charity in East Lothian.
- Joan Goodwin – Member, Housing Liaison Board, Yardley Wood. For services to Tenants and Leaseholders in Birmingham.
- Jennifer Ann Gow – Founder, A Bear Named Buttony. For services to charity in the North East of Scotland.
- Paul Gordon Graeme – For services to the Magistracy and the community in Sandwich, Kent.
- Dr. John Michael Grainger – chair, Microbiology in Schools Advisory Committee. For services to Microbiology.
- Rodney Grant (Raheem Luqmaan Mu Khepera) – Work Coach, Department for Work and Pensions. For services to Young People in Haringey, North London.
- Raymond Gray – For services to Search and Rescue in the UK and Abroad.
- Caroline Inez Green – Lately Non Executive Director, British Business Bank. For services to the Economy and to charity.
- Professor Abigail Gregory – Deputy Pro-Vice Chancellor, Faculty of Arts and Humanities, Manchester Metropolitan University. For services to Exports.
- Dr. Jane Elizabeth Haley (Jane Wyllie) – Neuroscience Scientific Co-ordinator, University of Edinburgh. For services to Scientific Engagement and Education.
- Dr. Frederick John Hall – For voluntary service to Armed Forces Medical Training.
- Georgia Kelly Hall – Golfer. For services to Golf.
- Fiona Hamilton-Fairley – chief executive officer, Kids' Cookery School. For services to Children with Special Educational Needs and Disabilities.
- Dr. Richard Anthony Hancock – For services to charity and the community in Chichester, West Sussex.
- Andrew Richard Hanson – Co-ordinator of Science Ambassadors, National Physical Laboratory. For services to STEM Education.
- Judith Mary Harper – For services in Fostering in Gawcott, Buckinghamshire.
- Gillian Ruth Harris – For services to Libraries in Education.
- Ian James Harris – Chief of Staff, British Embassy Kabul, Afghanistan. For services to British foreign policy
- Ian John Harris – Incident Officer, Network Rail. For services to the Railway in South Wales.
- Marcus David Hayes – For services to Education and Law in Cheshire.
- Clare Elizabeth Hayward DL – Board Member, Cheshire and Warrington Local Enterprise Partnership and chair, Make It Macclesfield. For services to Economic Regeneration in Macclesfield.
- David Christopher Hayward – chief executive officer, Micropore Technologies. For services to International Trade and the North East Chemical Sector.
- Caroline Anne Headon – Police Staff, South Wales Police. For services to Policing and Tackling Serious and Organised Crime in Wales.
- Norman Richard Healy – For services to Wildlife Management in England.
- Peter Michael Helps – For services to the Arts, Music and Education.
- Joseph Edgar Henderson – Group Chief Executive and Founder, Henderson Insurance Broking Group. For services to Business and the community in Lincolnshire.
- Michael Ridsdale Hepple – Senior Delivery Lead, Operational Excellence Digital Services – Automation, HM Revenue and Customs. For services to Taxpayers.
- Susanne Margaret Hewitt – Consultant Emergency Physician, University Hospitals of Derby and Burton NHS Foundation Trust. For services to Emergency Medicine.
- Dr. Helen Macpherson Hibbs – Clinical Accountable Officer, NHS Wolverhampton Clinical Commissioning Group. For services to NHS Leadership.
- Jaspaul Kaur Hill – Headteacher, Mayfield Primary School. For services to Education.
- Marcia Hipwell – For services to Fostering in Plymouth.
- Martin Andrew Hipwell – For services to Fostering in Plymouth.
- Sonia Hitch – Co-founder and volunteer, Peterborough Rape Crisis Care Group. For services to Survivors of Sexual Violence.
- Simon Christopher Hodges – Security Team Officer, Foreign and Commonwealth Office. For services to national security
- Ruth Elizabeth Holdaway – chief executive officer, Women in Sport. For services to Gender Equality in Sport.
- Andrew Nigel Horncastle – For services to charity and Business in the community in East Yorkshire.
- Jane Henson Horne – Lately Councillor, Forest of Dean District Council. For voluntary and charitable services to the community in the Forest of Dean.
- Mark Philip Horton – chief executive officer, Ballinderry Rivers Trust and All-Ireland Director, The Rivers Trust. For services to Conservation.
- Patricia Margaret Hudson – For services to Fostering in Birmingham.
- Skinder Singh Hundal – chief executive officer, The New Art Exchange. For services to Visual Arts.
- Kelly Hunter – Artistic Director, Flute Theatre. For services to Theatre.
- John Gordon Irwin – Consultant Chartered Surveyor. For services to Business and Economic Regeneration on Teesside.
- Elizabeth Jane Bewick Jackson – Partner, Herbert Smith Freehills. For services to the Northern Ireland Economy and Innovation in Law.
- Dawda Jatta – Founder and chief executive officer, Black and Minority Ethnic Environment Network. For services to Recycling and Energy Saving in Hull.
- Tayyebah Jiva – Adoption Team Manager, Penny Appeal. For services to Children and Families.
- Julie Marie Johns – Founder, Safe Space Consultancy. For services to People suffering Domestic Abuse and to charity.
- Dr. Adrian Brendan Johnston – For services to Peacebuilding and the community in Northern Ireland.
- Adam Nicholas Jollans – chair, Hampshire Scout Expeditions. For services to Scouting and Young People.
- John William Charles Jolly – Co-founder and Manager, Sudden Adult Death Trust UK. For services to Raising Awareness of Sudden Arrhythmic Death Syndrome.
- Christopher Jones – C2, Ministry of Defence. For services to Defence.
- Donald Jones – Founder, Cambridge College, Lima, Peru and Founding member of British Schools Peru and the Association of British Schools in Latin America. For services to education in Peru and Latin America
- George Christopher Jones – Operational Delivery Leader, Manchester. HM Revenue and Customs. For services to Customs.
- Stephen Henry Jones – For services to Sport.
- Henry Ramsay Duncan John Joynson – Adviser, President's Governance and Delivery Unit, Liberia. For services to development in Liberia
- Dr. Andrew Robert Kemp – Group Sales and marketing director, Bidfood. For services to the Hospitality Industry.
- Annmarie Kennedy – For political service.
- Michelle (Shelley) Kerr – Head Coach, Scottish Women's National Football Team. For services to Football.
- Sophie Caroline Kershen Crosby-Browne – Manager, British Chamber of Commerce for Luxembourg. For services to UK/Luxembourg commercial and business relations
- Marshall Kilgore – Principal, Drumachose Primary School. For services to Education and the community in Northern Ireland.
- David James King – Volunteer. For services to the Environment.
- Catherine Mary King (Catherine Bass) – Principal Expert by Experience, Independent Review of the Mental Health Act. For services to Mental Health Legislative Reform.
- Dr. Michael Joseph Kirton – Technology Officer, Foreign and Commonwealth Office. For services to national security
- Christine Emily Kitashima – For services to Fostering in Oxfordshire.
- Dr. Celia Knight – Celia Knight Consulting. For services to Plant Science Education.
- Hilary Knight – For services to the community in Plymouth, Devon.
- Michael John Ladd – Head of Special Projects, FCO Services. For services to the Foreign and Commonwealth Office
- John Charles Stuart Laidlaw – For services to the Arts.
- Walter Lambe – Head, Rathmore Educational Guidance Centre. For services to Education.
- Professor Duncan Austin Lawson – For services to Mathematics in Higher Education.
- Professor Alison Leary – For services to Spectator Safety and Medical Care.
- Darryl Mark Lee – For services to charity and the Jewish community in Manchester.
- David Robin Lee – Founder, Wilds Lodge School, Empingham, Oakham. For services to Children with Special Educational Needs and Disabilities.
- Gavin Tat Fai Lee JP – For services to the Chinese community in Scotland.
- Jeremy John Leggett – Trustee and vice-chair, Action with Communities in Rural England. For services to Rural Communities and Young People.
- Professor Melanie Jane Leng – Chief Scientist for Environmental Change, British Geological Survey, Professor, University of Nottingham. For services to Environmental Research.
- Patricia Kathleen Lerew – For services to the community in Alton, Hampshire.
- John Stephen Lewis – Managing Director, SOG Group. For services to Business in Liverpool.
- Elaine Lilley – Lately Chief Executive, Lincolnshire and Rutland Education Business Partnership. For services to Improving Links between Education and Business.
- Mahendra Kumar Limbu – Welfare Officer, Brigade of Gurkhas. For services to Gurkha Personnel and their Families.
- Linda Barbara Lloyd Jones – Head of Exhibitions and Loans, Victoria and Albert Museum. For services to British Culture.
- Lesley Logan – Regional Manager, NHS Blood and Transplant. For services to Healthcare and Organ Donation.
- Linda Mary Longstaff – For services to the community in Sunderland.
- Janice Lopatkin – UK Programme Director, World Jewish Relief. For services to Refugees.
- Julia Anne Lorrain-Smith DL – For services to the Children's Hearings System in Scotland and the community in Midlothian.
- Jayne Louise Ludlow – Manager, Wales Women's Football. For services to Women's Football in Wales.
- Christine Marie Lunn – For services to Fostering in Rotherham.
- Frances Lysyj – Lately Headteacher, St Thomas of Canterbury RC Bolton Primary. For services to Education.
- Norman MacDonald – chairman, Highland Hospice. For services to charity and Terminally Ill People in the Highlands and Islands.
- Janet MacGregor – Team Leader, HM Revenue and Customs. For public and charitable services.
- John Allan MacKechnie – Artist and Printmaker. For services to Art.
- Elizabeth Herries (Judy) MacKenzie – For voluntary service to Wheelchair Curling.
- John MacKin – Director, Credit Unions of Glasgow Ltd. For services to Credit Unions in the UK.
- Karen Margaret MacKinnon – For services to the Arts.
- Roger John Maggs – chairman, Port Talbot Waterfront Enterprise Zone. For services to the Economy in Wales.
- Kate Olivia Malone – For services to UK Ceramic Art.
- Dr. Helen Sarah Margolis – Fellow, National Physical Laboratory. For services to Metrology.
- Denise Sylvia Marshall – For services to Pregnant Women and New Mothers in Prison
- Alice Adelaide Mascarenhas – lately Deputy and Features Editor, Gibraltar Chronicle. For services to media, culture and the arts in Gibraltar
- Mark Martin – For services to Education, Technology and Diversity in UK Technology.
- Lorna McAlpine – For services to Integrated Education in Northern Ireland.
- Christine Mary McGowan (Christine Collings) – For services to Developing the Arts in Wolverhampton.
- Catherine Frances McIlroy – Allied Health Professional Manager, Acute Services, Southern Health and Social Care Trust. For services to Physiotherapy.
- Abbie Elizabeth McKenna – Workforce Development Manager, Ulster University. For services to Higher Education and to Deaf Children.
- David McKown – For services to Hospitality and Catering Training.
- Duncan James McLaren – Lead Technical Adviser, Valuation Office Agency. For services to the Surveying Profession.
- Georgios Meliniotis – Physics Teacher, the Meridian School, Royston, Hertfordshire. For services to Education.
- Anna Howard Meredith – Composer. For services to Music.
- Julianne Mary Miles – For services to Business and Equality.
- Jacqueline Naomi Milliner – Residence Manager, H.M. Ambassador's Residence, Tel Aviv, Israel. For services to UK/Israel relations
- David Lockwood Mowbray – For community service in the UK and Abroad.
- Dr. David Barclay Murray – For services to Healthcare and the community in Wester Ross.
- Rashid Mustapha – For services to Radio Broadcasting.
- Mark Debal Nandi – Regional Counter Terrorism Adviser, North Africa and the Sahel, Foreign and Commonwealth Office. For services to national security
- Shereen Nanjiani – For services to Broadcasting in Scotland.
- Dr. Syed Muhammed Habib Naqvi – Policy Lead, Workforce Race Equality Standard, NHS England. For services to Equality and Diversity in the NHS.
- Syed Muhammad Iqbal Nasim – For services to Community Development and to Tackling Poverty.
- Andrew Howard Martin Nebel – For services to Charitable Fundraising.
- Edwin Neesom – chairman and managing director, Hunprenco Ltd. For services to Exports and the Rural Economy in North Yorkshire.
- Alison Neil – chief executive officer, South Georgia Heritage Trust. For services to Conservation.
- Philippa Jane Nightingale – Chief Nurse and executive director, Chelsea and Westminster Hospital NHS Foundation Trust and Trustee, Rennie Grove Hospice Care. For services to Midwifery.
- Michael Clive Norman – Volunteer and Founder Member, Penllergare Valley Woods. For services to Welsh Heritage.
- Frank William Norris – Director, Co-operative Academies Trust. For services to Education.
- Catherine Lorraine O'Brien – Director, Welsh Blood Service. For services to the Welsh Blood Service and the Adoption of Cell and Gene Therapies in Wales.
- Victoria Imogen Ogden – Financial Analyst, HM Treasury. For public service.
- Craig Daniel O’Kane – lately Head of Office and Director of Investment Australia and New Zealand, British Consulate Brisbane, Australia. For services to UK/Australia relations and international trade
- Martin O'Neill – Director, Bobath Scotland. For services to People with Cerebral Palsy and voluntary service in Glasgow.
- Christine Audrey Outram (Christine Potts) – chair, The Christie NHS Foundation Trust. For services to NHS Patients.
- Priscilla Mary Padley – Founder, Nene Valley Trust. For services to Children and Families in Northamptonshire and Peterborough.
- Joanne Elizabeth Pardavila – Customer Services Manager, Aviva Health Insurance. For services to the Economy and the community in Manchester.
- Ruth Ilse Parker – Desk Officer, Foreign and Commonwealth Office. For services to British foreign policy and national security
- Joanne Parry – Head, Year of Engineering Communications, Department for Transport. For services to Engineering.
- Dr. Rajesh Patel – Deputy National Medical Director for Primary Care, NHS England. For services to Healthcare.
- Hugh Geoffrey Pearman – For services to Architecture.
- Angus Maitland Pelham Burn – For services to the community in Aberdeenshire.
- Peter James William Pepys-Goodchild – For public and political service.
- Charlie Kyriacos Michael Pericleous – For services to the Prevention of Extremism and Hate Crime in Portsmouth.
- Michael James Perls – For services to the community in Manchester.
- William Thomas (Liam) Perry – Principal, St Columbanus College, Bangor. For services to Education.
- John Anthony Peter – Founding Judge, Ian Charleson Awards. For services to Theatre.
- Susan Peters – Customer Adviser, Aviva. For services to the Economy and Customer Service.
- Dr. Emma Margaret Philpott – chief executive officer, IASME Consortium Ltd. For services to Cyber Security.
- Christine Margaret Pickersgill – Teacher, Colyton Grammar School. For services to Education.
- Mark (David) Pickles – Director of EU Regulatory Affairs, National Grid. For services to the Electricity Market.
- Suzanne Louise Poley – Consultant Nurse for Substance Misuse, University Hospital of Wales, Cardiff. For services to Nursing.
- David Alexander Poole – Member, Lower Wensleydale Business Network. For services to Business, Skills and the community in Wensleydale.
- Brenda Mary Potter – For services to Children and Families in London.
- Gordon John Potter – For services to Children and Families in London.
- Katherine Jane Prince – For services to Dance.
- Mary Louise Prince – Teacher, Reading Centre, Kingston upon Thames. For services to Young People with Dyslexia in Kingston upon Thames.
- Howard John Ramm – For services to the Royal National Lifeboat Institution.
- Christopher Ramsey – For services to Football and Diversity in Sport.
- Peter Howard Ransom – For voluntary service to Mathematics Education.
- Jacquelyn Anne Rason – For services to Road Safety.
- Emma Gabrielle Ratzer (Emmeline Gallant) – Chief Executive, Access Community Trust. For services to the community in Suffolk.
- Helen Marie Rawdon – For services to Fostering in the East Riding of Yorkshire.
- Abigail Caroline Ann Reader – For services to Farming.
- Peter Martin Reddin – For services to Gymnastics.
- Dr. Peter Dennis Reed JP – Magistrate and Mediator. For services to the Administration of Justice and the community in Bristol.
- Daniel Frederick Reid – For services to Charitable Organisations in Northamptonshire.
- Adam Birrell Reid – chief executive officer, Street Child United, Brazil. For services to sport, underprivileged children and the British community in Brazil
- John Reid – Area Manager for Legacy Benefits, Department for Work and Pensions. For services to Vulnerable Customers in Scotland and the community in Inverclyde.
- William Andrew Reid – Volunteer Ambassador, ABF The Soldiers' Charity. For voluntary service to Veterans and to People with Disabilities in St Helens, Merseyside.
- Dr. Timothy John Reynish – Conductor. For services to Music.
- Jane Anne Reynolds – chair, Tees Valley Business Club and Business Development Manager, NorthStar Ventures. For services to SMEs and the Tees Valley Economy.
- Kenneth David Reynolds – Lately Student Support Worker, The Blandford School. For services to At-Risk Young People in the community in Blandford Forum, Dorset.
- Andrew Roachford – For services to Music.
- Clarence Bennie Robinson BEM – For services to the community in Burton-upon-Trent, Staffordshire.
- Patricia Roden – Senior Officer in Charge, Reasonable Adjustments Support Team. For services to Disability Support.
- Sidney James Roffey – For services to World War Two Evacuees and their Families.
- David Graham Rogers – chief executive officer, Copper Horse Ltd. For services to Cyber Security.
- Rachael Ross – Founder, Portsmouth Down Syndrome Association. For services to Education and Down Syndrome.
- Simon Paul Rowe – For services to the community in Salisbury.
- Mark Gordon Runacus – For services to Advertising.
- Katherine Jane Ryan – Headteacher, Matthew Arnold School. For services to Education.
- Sarabjit Kaur Sahota – For services to Education.
- Khalid Saifullah – For services to the community in North West England.
- Imran Sanaullah – chief executive officer, Patchwork Foundation. For services to Young People.
- Nicholas Mark Sanders – For services to Endurance Cycling and Motorcycling.
- Anne Patricia Sarrag – For services to Improving Access to Reading in the UK.
- Susan Savage – For services to the community in Rotherham, South Yorkshire.
- Cary Rajinder Sawhney – For services to Film.
- Margaret Lesley Scott – Lately Headteacher, Forest Lodge Primary School. For services to Education.
- Sandra May Scotting – For services to the community in East London and Kent.
- Ian Christopher Norman Seaton – Lately Chairman, Board of Governors, City of London School. For services to Education and Training in London.
- Colin John Seccombe – Board Member, UK Community Foundations. For services to Business and the community in North East England.
- Madonna Sarah Shaughnessy – Higher Officer, National Frontier Approvals Unit, Border Force, Home Office. For public service.
- Dr. Abdullahi Shehu – For services to Community Cohesion in Coventry.
- Robert James Shephard – For services to the Environment and community in Patterdale.
- Jane Shepherd – Managing Director, Shepherd PR. For services to International Trade and the community in Staffordshire.
- Kathryn Louise Shippey – For voluntary service to Inclusion in Football Spectating.
- Peter David Shippey – For voluntary service to Inclusion in Football Spectating.
- William Henry Sholdis – For services to the Scout Movement and to Young People in North and West Belfast.
- Dr. Marie Short – Trustee, Scottish Huntington's Association and Coach, Grangemouth Synchronised Swimming Club. For services to charity.
- Ian Thomas Simpson – Immigration Officer, Home Office. For public service.
- Aghia Pal Singh – Infrastructure Engineer, West Midlands Fire and Rescue Service. For services to charity and the community in the West Midlands.
- Christine Eleanor Sloan – Founder, Crathie Opportunity Holidays. For services to People with Disabilities and to Tourism.
- Matthew Clifford Smith – Business Manager, Sheringham Woodfields School and Founder and Trustee, North Walsham Play. For services to Children with Special Education Needs and Disabilities.
- Mark Andrew Smith – International Liaison Officer, British Embassy, Quito, Ecuador. For services to international security
- Alfred Arnold Smithers – British Honorary Consul, Halifax, Canada. For services to British nationals overseas
- David Murray Alexander Smythe – chairman, Association of Scotland's Self-Caterers. For services to the Tourism Industry.
- Daniel Snow – Journalist, Historian and Presenter. For services to History.
- Narendra Kantilal Solanki – chair, Multi Academy Trust, St Simon and St Judes Primary School, Bolton. For services to Education.
- Shirley Joan Sorbie – For services to Children with Disabilities in Dorset.
- Jacalyn Tarry Southcombe – Performance Improvement and Project Lead, HM Revenue and Customs. For services to Taxation, Mental Health Support and charity.
- Christie Darren Spurling – Founder, N-Gage. For services to Young People in Greater Manchester.
- Alexandra Jane Stanyer – Founder and Principal, The Puzzle Centre. For services to Young People with Autism.
- Jennifer Mary Stephens – Chief Officer for Adult Care and Health, Devon County Council. For services to Social Care.
- Jacqueline Elizabeth Stewart – Lately Principal, Downshire High School. For services to Education.
- Gavin Eric Stones – Technical Manager, National Measurement Office Certification Body, Department for Business, Energy and Industrial Strategy. For services to Product Safety.
- Samuel Francis John Stopford – For services to Ballroom and Latin American Dance.
- Catherine Margaret Strachan – Learning and Development Manager, MBDA UK Ltd. For services to Career Development and to Young People.
- Nicholas Graham Sturge – Director, Engine Shed. For services to the Digital Economy.
- Emdad Hossain Talukder – Community Resource Officer, Tower Hamlets Social Services Family Placement Services and Foster Carer. For services to Fostering.
- Gillian Claire Taylor – Macmillan Nurse Consultant, London North West Healthcare NHS Trust. For services to Colorectal Cancer Nursing.
- Katherine Rachel Taylor – Owner and Director, Drewtons Ltd. For services to the Economy and community in Yorkshire.
- Kevin Michael Taylor – lately President, British Telecom Asia, Middle East and Africa and lately chairman, British Chamber of Commerce, Hong Kong. For services to UK/Hong Kong commercial relations
- Katie Taylor – D, Ministry of Defence. For services to Defence.
- William Douglas Tennant (William Bregulla) – For voluntary service in the UK and Ghana.
- Bernadette Thomas – Intercountry Adoption Team Leader, Department for Education. For services to Young People.
- Edwin Francis Thomas JP – chairman, British Ex-Services Wheelchair Sports Association. For services to Disability Sport and the community in Cornwall.
- Fay Margaret Doreen Thomas – Fundraiser, National Society for the Prevention of Cruelty to Children. For services to Children.
- Dawn Thomas – Team Leader, Foreign and Commonwealth Office. For services to diversity
- Nicholas Jeffrey Thomas – Founder and chairman, Qdos Entertainment Limited. For services to the Entertainment Industry and to charity.
- Ann Marion Thomson – chair, Extend Exercise Training Ltd. For services to Physiotherapy Education and Disabled People through Swimming Exercise.
- Charles Ian Howie Thomson – Vice Chairman, Scottish Target Shooting. For services to Target Shooting.
- Sylvia Margaret Tiffney – For services to Children in North East Lincolnshire.
- Brian James Tobin – chief executive officer, Iceni Ipswich. For services to Drug Rehabilitation in Suffolk.
- Robin Townsend – For services to the community in South Wiltshire.
- Yuk Kiu Tse – chair, Anglo Chinese Cultural Exchange, Ipswich. For voluntary service to the community in Suffolk.
- Andrew John Turner – For services to the community in Chorley, Lancashire.
- John Philip Turner – For services to Healthcare and the community in Portsmouth.
- Lynn Denise Tyler – Executive Assistant to Director, Air Support, Defence Equipment and Support, Ministry of Defence. For services to Defence.
- Jonathan David Vaughan – Executive Director, Lilongwe Wildlife Trust, Malawi. For services to combating the illegal wildlife trade in Malawi.
- Dexter Edgar Vickery – Head of Network and Resources, Europe Directorate, Foreign and Commonwealth Office. For services to British foreign policy
- Michael David Viggers – Lately Chair, Western Sussex Hospitals NHS Foundation Trust and Brighton and Sussex University Hospitals NHS Trust. For services to the NHS.
- Ghulam Mohammed Vohra – Vice Chairman, Coventry Muslim Forum. For services to Community Cohesion.
- Saira Wajid – Head of Engagement, Museum of London. For services to Culture and Diversity.
- Susan Elizabeth Wakefield – Scheme Coordinator, Independent Visitor Scheme, Doncaster Children's Trust. For services to Children in Care in Doncaster.
- Melanie Jane Walker – Chief Executive, Devon Partnership NHS Trust and chair, Space. For services to Mental Health and Learning Disabilities in the NHS.
- Ruth Jane Walker – Executive Nurse Director, Cardiff and Vale University Health Board. For services to Nursing in the NHS.
- Ruth Wallace – For services to Young People and the Belfast Trust Fostering Service.
- Colin James Walsh – chief executive officer, Crescent Capital, Northern Ireland. For services to Economic Development in Northern Ireland.
- Frances Rosemary Watson – For services to People with Learning Disabilities in Gloucestershire.
- Mark Watson – For services to Community Policing.
- Janice Way – Lately Intercountry Adoption Programme and Training Development Manager, The Centre for Adoption. For services to Vulnerable Children and Families.
- Ian Christopher Weatherill – Managing Director, Hope Technology Ltd. For services to Business, Innovation and the community in Lancashire.
- Liane Weller – C1, Ministry of Defence. For services to Defence.
- Susan Westwood – Regional Lead, Adoption Counts Regional Adoption Agency, Stockport. For services to Vulnerable Children and Families.
- Timothy Charles Wheeler – For services to charity and Education.
- John Andrew Whelan – For services to Business and Equality.
- Jean Sheila Whimster – Secretary, The Glasgow Society of Women Artists. For services to the Promotion of Women in Art.
- Jacqueline White – For services to charity and Vulnerable People in Cornwall.
- Keith Terence White – Senior Manager, UK Financial Intelligence Unit, National Crime Agency. For services to Law Enforcement.
- Dr. Peter Norman Whitehead – For services to Equestrian Sport Science and Medicine.
- Terence Keith Wilcox – For voluntary service to the Special Olympics.
- Peter Neil Wilson – Test Pilot, BAE Systems. For services to UK defence
- Councillor David Tyrie Williams JP – For political service in Local Government.
- Elizabeth Alana Williams – Director, Digital Society, BT. For services to Digital Literacy and Social Inclusion.
- Susan Williams – For services to the community in Lymm, Cheshire.
- Derek John Wilson – For public and political service.
- Dr. Jean Lesley Wilson – President, Church Monuments Society. For services to Heritage.
- Jennifer May Wilson – For services to Scottish Country Dancing and charity.
- Clive Leslie Wood – Managing Director, Tees Components Ltd. For services to Engineering, Skills and the community on Teesside.
- Jacqueline Claire Woodcock – Founder and Patron, Dying to Work Campaign. For services to Employment Protection for Terminally Ill Workers.
- Matthew Woodcock – For services to Forestry and the Development of Woodfuel.
- Margaret Mary Woodhouse – For services to Education across Greater Manchester.
- Janis Ann Wright – Specialist Nurse, Orthopaedics, Ipswich Hospital NHS Trust. For services to Nursing.
- Grantley William Yearwood – For services to the community in West London.
- Wendy Yianni – For services to Education and the community in the London Borough of Brent.
- Jurgita Zilinskiene – Founder and chief executive officer, Guildhawk (lately Today Translations). For services to International Trade.

Military

- Warrant Officer John Alpert, Royal Air Force
- Major Simon Peter Ash, VR, General List, Army Reserve
- Acting Staff Sergeant Lorraine Bennett, VR, Adjutant General's Corps (Military Provost Staff Branch), Army Reserve
- Corporal Alexander Edward Binks, Royal Corps of Signals
- Warrant Officer Class 2 Daniel Charles Bird, Royal Corps of Signals
- Captain Gregory Philip Blezard, Royal Corps of Signals
- Warrant Officer Class 2 Matthew Stewart Bragg, The Royal Logistic Corps
- Major Tracey Elizabeth Brooks, Adjutant General's Corps (Royal Military Police)
- Lieutenant Colonel Richard Neil Byfield, Royal Corps of Signals
- Squadron Leader Beverley Cartwright, Royal Air Force
- Captain Gary Case, The Rifles, Army Reserve
- Commander Adam Gregory Clarke, Royal Navy
- Major Robert John Colquhoun, The Royal Regiment of Scotland
- Flight Lieutenant Neil Cottle, Royal Air Force
- Lieutenant Colonel Paul David Denton, Corps of Royal Electrical and Mechanical Engineers
- Warrant Officer Class 2 Stephen Christian Dixon, Royal Corps of Signals
- Major John Hutchison Dunn, Scots Guards
- Lieutenant Colonel Gregory Colin Ehlen, Adjutant General's Corps (Staff and Personnel Support Branch)
- Chief Petty Officer Air Engineering Technician (Avionics) Thomas Michael Eland, Royal Navy
- Major Rosamund Veronica Elliott, Corps of Royal Engineers
- Warrant Officer Class 2 David Robert Evans, VR, 1st The Queen's Dragoon Guards, Army Reserve
- Major Roy Falshaw, VR, The Royal Yeomanry, Army Reserve.
- Major Jonathan David Leonard Ferman, Royal Tank Regiment
- Sergeant Andrew James Floyd, Royal Air Force
- Air Engineering Technician (Mechanical) Matthew Kenneth Gallimore, Royal Navy
- Major Storm William Green, Coldstream Guards
- Major David Charles Groce, The Royal Logistic Corps
- Major Nicholas Alexander Heppenstall, The Royal Logistic Corps
- Warrant Officer Class 1 Martin James Howlin, Grenadier Guards
- Squadron Leader Robert Lockhart McCartney, Royal Air Force
- Captain Paul John McComb, The Parachute Regiment
- Captain Ian McDougall, Royal Marines
- Major Mark McGroarty, The Royal Irish Regiment
- Squadron Leader Andrew Paul Millikin, Royal Air Force
- Major Nigel Ian Mudd, Royal Regiment of Artillery
- Major Gordon William Muir, The Royal Regiment of Scotland
- Captain Geoffrey John Nicholls, The Mercian Regiment
- Squadron Leader Roisin Mary O’Brien, Royal Air Force
- Major Shaun Thomas Phillips, The Parachute Regiment
- Warrant Officer 1 (Physical Trainer) Natasha Pulley, Royal Navy
- Corporal Netrabahadur Rana, The Royal Gurkha Rifles
- Lieutenant Commander James Reynolds, Royal Navy
- Commander Kevin Francis Robertson, Royal Navy
- Major Fiona Jill Rogers, Adjutant General's Corps (Educational and Training Services Branch), Army Reserve,
- Major Taitusi Kagi Saukuru, QGM, The Royal Logistic Corps
- Wing Commander Tara Elizabeth Scott, Royal Air Force
- Lieutenant Commander Martin Shakespeare, Royal Naval Reserve
- Flight Sergeant Adrian Terry Shepherd, Royal Air Force
- Warrant Officer Class 2 Philip John Smith, Royal Corps of Signals
- Flight Lieutenant Michael Anthony Stokes, Royal Air Force
- Captain Darren Lee Taylor, Royal Army Physical Training Corps
- Acting Flight Sergeant Ann Thomas, Royal Air Force
- Warrant Officer Class 1 Marc Thomson, Adjutant General's Corps (Royal Military Police)
- Chief Petty Officer Engineering Technician (Communication Information Systems) Helena Gail Ward, Royal Navy
- Warrant Officer 2 Andrew Philip Watson, Royal Marines
- Acting Major John Dennis Wharton, Adjutant General's Corps (Military Provost Staff Branch)
- Warrant Officer John Vaughan Williams, Royal Air Force
- Warrant Officer Class 2 Donna Longhurst, Adjutants General's Corp (Royal Military Police)

=== British Empire Medal (BEM) ===
Civil

- Dr. Naeem Ahmed, Consultant Radiologist, Chelsea and Westminster NHS Foundation Trust and Founder, Selfless. For services to volunteering and Healthcare.
- Naseem Akhtar. For services to Health, Fitness and Sports for Women in Birmingham.
- Robert Michael Anderson. For voluntary service to Sport in Peterlee, County Durham.
- Helena Anderson-Wright, Convenor, Robert Burns World Federation Schools Committee (North East Section). For services to the Arts in Aberdeenshire.
- David John Arlott, Watch Manager, Oxfordshire Fire and Rescue Service. For services to Fire and Rescue in Oxfordshire.
- Patricia Ascroft. For services to Fundraising and the community in Garstang, Lancashire.
- Dr. Andrew Ashbee. For services to the community in Snodland, Kent.
- Richard William Austin. For services to the community in Boston, Lincolnshire.
- Rev Carol Rosemary Avery. For services to the community in Kent.
- Graham Ayres, Firefighter, Northamptonshire Fire and Rescue Service. For services to the Fire Service and the community in Brackley, Northamptonshire.
- Charles Bain, Fundraiser, Alzheimer's Research. For services to charity in Aberdeen.
- Gillian Bainbridge, Secretary, Bells Lane and Aspley Tenants and Residents Association. For services to Tenants.
- Martin Stewart Bartlett. For services to the community in Stratford-upon-Avon, Warwickshire.
- Roger Beard. For services to the community in Newent, Gloucestershire.
- Kevin Allan Beaumont. For services to Minor County Cricket.
- Mervyn Best. For services to the community in Northern Ireland.
- Andrew Bignell. For services to Public Libraries.
- Trudie Jane Bird. For services to Charitable Fundraising and the community in Milton Keynes.
- Winifred Yvonne Craig Birnie, Treasurer, Rothiemurchus and Aviemore Tennis Club. For services to Sport in Badenoch and Strathspey.
- Alison Elizabeth Blayney. For services to the community in Kilcooley, Northern Ireland.
- June Patricia Boyne (June Ranger). For services to Dance in Swanage.
- Anne Elizabeth Bradshaw, Lately Head of Operations and Regulatory Affairs, Imperial College Healthcare NHS Trust. For services to Laboratory Medicine.
- Kimberley Ann Briggs, Resource and Finance Director, East Belfast Community Development Agency. For services to the community in East Belfast.
- Thomas George Dennis Brock. For services to the community in Sunbury on Thames.
- Ann Isabel Brogan, Co-Lead for Emergency Responders, Glasgow and Renfrewshire and chair, Volunteer Fundraisers, Renfrewshire. For voluntary service in Renfrewshire.
- Maureen Bruce. For services to Young People and the community in Cheshunt, Hertfordshire.
- Michael David Brunton. For services to the community in Allington and Boscombe, Wiltshire.
- Wilfred Burt. For services to Scouting, Young People and the community in Stoke-on-Trent.
- Deborah Ann Burton, President, Forest Fire Alert Association, the Algarve, Portugal. For services to the community in the Algarve, Portugal
- Martin Burton. For services to Public Libraries.
- Reverend John Walter Butcher, Force Chaplain, West Midlands Police. For services to West Midlands Police and the community in Birmingham.
- Jean Butterfield. Town Councillor, Harrogate Town Council. For services to Local Government.
- Pauline Elizabeth Byles, Associate Head, Dr. Triplett's C of E Primary School. For services to Education and the community in London.
- Andrew John Callard. For voluntary service to Weightlifting.
- Raymond Stephen Carroll, Car Pool Manager, Northern Ireland Office. For public service.
- Ian Lee Carter. For services to the Church and charity in Essex.
- Sandra Cartner. For services to Charitable Fundraising.
- Julie Frances Cashell. Manager, Oaklands Care Home. For services to Older People in Powys.
- William Robert Caskey, Watch Commander, Magherafelt Fire Station. For services to the community in Magherafelt.
- David John Cawthorn. For services to Hockey.
- Asal Chaharsough-Shirazi, Founder, Jeunvie Skincare and the Autoimmune Support Awareness London. For services to Autoimmune Disease Awareness and Education.
- Lynn Mary Chantrey, Police Staff Volunteer, Lincolnshire Police. For voluntary service to the community in Lincolnshire.
- Mary Francisca Sarah Chapman. For services to Adult Education in Rochester and Medway, Kent.
- Winifred Taggart Chinery, Nurse, Southend University Hospital NHS Foundation Trust. For services to Nursing and Patient Safety.
- Christopher John Chittell, Actor. For services to Drama and charity.
- Barry Frederick Clark. For services to Libraries.
- Patricia Diane Clarke, Diabetes Specialist Nurse, Primary Integrated Community Services Ltd. For services to Diabetes Care.
- David Allan Clegg, Founder, Trebus Projects. For services to People with Dementia.
- Kathleen Cleveland-Dunn. For services to Charitable Fundraising in North London.
- Lorna Clyne. For voluntary service to Hockey in Scotland.
- Valerie Anne Collard. For services to Children and charity.
- Anthony Frederick Charles Collier. For services to Charity, Fundraising and the community in Cheshire.
- Richard David Collins. For services to the community in Cookstown, County Tyrone.
- Mary Kidd Conacher. For services to Kayaking and Canoeing in Scotland.
- Isabel Charlene Almeida Condeco. For services to Slamannan Parish Church and the community in Stirlingshire.
- David Cook, Lately Driver, Government Car Service. For public service.
- Frederick Robert Cookes. For services to the community in Barston Village, Solihull.
- Maria Coulter, Personal and Business Coach, The Construction Coach. For services to Diversity and Inclusion in the Construction Industry.
- Bernard Coyne. For voluntary service to Rugby Union in Middlesbrough.
- David Masson Craig. For services to Outdoor Education and Canoeing on Speyside.
- Valerie Violet Crichton. For services to Road Racing in Northern Ireland.
- Elizabeth Mary Crockett. For services to the community in Worthing, West Sussex.
- Janet Mary Croxson. For services to the community in Brockdish, Norfolk.
- Anne Cunningham, Volunteer, Thames Valley Police. For services to Policing and the community in Faringdon, Oxfordshire.
- Stewart Cusden, lately chair, British Benevolent Fund, Madrid, Spain. For services to the British community in Spain.
- Munsif Dad. For political service.
- Andrew Dalton. For services to the community in Morley, West Yorkshire.
- Stanley Francis Davies. For services to the community in Braintree, Essex.
- Beverly Jean Denbury, chairperson and Founder, The Journey of Hope, Botswana. For services to breast cancer awareness in Botswana.
- Joanna Louise Dervisoglu. For services to Women following Mastectomy Surgery.
- Dr. Sivaramkrishnan Devaraj, Volunteer. For services to Health Charity Fundraising and General Practice.
- Elizabeth Dimmock. For services to Gender Equality.
- Robert Patrick Doherty. For services to Young People through Golf in Portrush, Northern Ireland.
- Brigid Dougherty, Staff Officer, Probation Board for Northern Ireland. For services to Criminal Justice.
- James Downing, Founder, London Youth Rowing. For services to Rowing and Young People in London.
- Richard Dunk. For voluntary service to the Royal National Lifeboat Institution.
- Janet Dunn. For services to the community in Sefton.
- Jean Dunn, Nurse, County Durham and Darlington NHS Foundation Trust. For services to Nursing.
- Susan Durrant, C2, Ministry of Defence. For services to Defence.
- Jennifer Durward, Volunteer, Accord Hospice, Paisley. For services to Palliative Care in Renfrewshire.
- Shirley Muriel Ellis. For services to People with Learning Disabilities in Pwllheli, Gwynedd.
- Fiona Ruth Ellwood, Lately Senior Lecturer and External Examiner, University of Chester and Patron, The Society of British Dental Nurses. For services to Dentistry.
- Jonathan Eno. For services to Jazz Music Education.
- Justine Charlotte Everett, Ground Operations Manager, EasyJet. For services to Border Security.
- Judith Farquharson. For services to the community in Killingworth.
- Rosemary Ann Fell. For voluntary service to the British Malaysian Society.
- Siobhan Fennell, Founder, Accessible Belper. For services to Transport Accessibility, Inclusion and Disability Awareness.
- Kathryn Jane Fielding. For services to Goalball and Blind and Partially Sighted People.
- Deborah Jane Fletcher. For services to the community in Folkestone, Kent.
- Julie Elizabeth Fountain, Dental Care Professional and Manager, Teeth Team Limited. For services to Dentistry.
- Anthony William Freeman. For services to charity and the community in Taunton, Somerset.
- Dr. Peter Michael Frost. For services to community in Peckham, London.
- Horace Alfred Gafan, Lately Dock Master, Gibdock Limited, Gibraltar. For services to the ship repair industry in Gibraltar
- Nigel James Gayner JP. For services to the community in Southend on Sea, Essex.
- John Stanley Gibbons, Choral and music director. For services to Music.
- Leonard Gibson. For services to World War Two Remembrance and the community in Sunderland.
- Carol Anne Gilson. For services to the community in Honiton, Devon.
- Michael John Gittus JP. For services to the community in Alcester, Warwickshire.
- John Glover. For services to Athletics.
- James McCrorie Gourlay, Founder, Vaspar Football Club. For services to Youth and Professional Football.
- Heather Jane Gracey. For services to the community in Lisburn.
- Kate Mary-Rose Grant. For services to the community in Cookstown, County Tyrone.
- Robert George Bruce Grant. For services to charity.
- Jennifer Valmai Margaret Greenwood. For services to the community in Lydgate, Greater Manchester.
- Thomas William Howard Greenwood. For services to Music and the community in Richmond upon Thames.
- Barry Gribben, Building Supervisor, Edenderry Primary School. For services to Education and Sport in Armagh.
- John David Griffin. For services to Running in Wales.
- Alan Thomas Griffiths. For services to the community in Foleshill, Coventry.
- Frederick Wayne Gruba. For services to Victims of Terrorism.
- Marilyn Haddon. For services to Charitable Fundraising.
- Clare Janette Haggart, co-director, Phoenix Theatre. For services to Theatre and the Arts in the North East of Scotland.
- Michael William Haines. For services to People with Disabilities in Cambridgeshire.
- Enid Hales. For services to the community in Newton-le-Willows, Merseyside.
- Margaret Frances Hall. For services to the community in Dunfermline and the Kuvela Othandwen charity.
- Caroline June Hampson. For services to the Arts and the community in Bedwas, Caerphilly.
- Jeffrey Gerard Hancock, Police Staff, Metropolitan Police Service. For services to charity.
- Simon Christopher Harding. For voluntary service to the community in Bury St Edmunds.
- Leonard Hardy. For services to Armed Forces Veterans in Warwickshire.
- Georgina Lynde Harvey, President, Original Charity Shop and Library, Javea, Spain. For services to charity
- Doris Agatha Harper-Wills. For services to Arts Education and Culture.
- Graham Leslie Harris. For services to the community in the Mendips, Somerset.
- His Honour John David Woodburn Hayman. For services to the community in Binsted and Alton, Hampshire.
- Susan Margaret Henderson, Student Services Manager, University of Winchester. For services to Higher Education.
- Valerie Jane Hepworth. For services to the Yorkshire Gardens Trust and Conservation.
- June Mary Herron. For services to Highland Dancing and the community in Elgin and Moray.
- John Peter Hess. For services to the community in Chorlton, Cheshire.
- Stephen Hicks, Lately Police Constable, Metropolitan Police Service. For services to Young People in Enfield, London.
- John Noel Hillier. For voluntary service to Athletics.
- David Alfred Hitcham. For services to the community in Aylsham.
- Andrew Edmund Forster Hitchen. For services to music in Harrogate, North Yorkshire.
- Bruce Anthony Hoad, Director and Strategic Advisor, Operation Florian, Republic of Moldova. For services to emergency service personnel and vulnerable communities in the Republic of Moldova.
- David Hogben. For services to the community in Herne Bay, Kent.
- Elizabeth Anne Hoggan. For services to the community in Cupar and to Dr. Graham's Homes in Kalimpong, India.
- Helen Holland. For voluntary service to the community in North Belfast.
- Susan Elizabeth Hollingworth. For services to Music and the community in Scunthorpe.
- Robert William Irwin Holmes, Staff Officer, Benefit Security Division, Department for Communities, Northern Ireland Executive. For services to Fundraising.
- Isabel Graham Hood, Environmental Campaigner. For services to Environmental Conservation.
- Stephen Hoskins. For services to Young People in the Scouting Movement in Northern Ireland.
- Joan Howarth. For voluntary service to the community in Somerset and Wiltshire.
- Major Brian Michael Hudson. For voluntary service to the community in Sussex.
- Christine Anne Hughes, Physiotherapist. For services to People with Learning Disabilities in Wrexham, North Wales.
- Courtney Hughes. For services to Older and Vulnerable People in Oxfordshire.
- Gareth James Hughes. For services to Fundraising and Autism Awareness.
- Gerald Humes. For voluntary and charitable services.
- Judith Margaret Hutton. For services to the community in Ilkley, West Yorkshire.
- Ronald Aloysius Hyde-Williams, Lately Data and MI Officer, Department for Business, Energy and Industrial Strategy. For public service and Diversity and Inclusion.
- Susan Joy James. For services to Save the Children.
- Richard Jay. For services to Young People and Music in Northern Ireland.
- Dr. Pauline Jeffree. For services to the community in Beckenham.
- Ian Kevin Jenkins, Caseworker, Driver and Vehicle Licensing Agency. For public and community service in Swansea.
- Wendy Johnson. Head of Adult Safeguarding and Mental Health, Great Western Hospitals NHS Foundation Trust. For services to Nursing.
- Annie Johnston. For services to Irish Craftwork.
- Catherine Carson Johnston. For services to the community in Ladykirk, Berwickshire.
- Walter Kammerling. For services to Holocaust Education and Awareness.
- Vallabh Kaviraj. For services to Asian Media and the South Asian community in the UK.
- Brian Edward Keen. For services to the community in Riccall, North Yorkshire.
- Gabriele Keenaghan. For services to Holocaust Education and Awareness.
- Dr. Anne (Rex) Kelly. For services to Victims of Modern Slavery.
- Peter Ernest Kidd. For services to the community in Little Bealings, Suffolk.
- Nicholas Hector Kier DL. For services to the community in Bedfordshire.
- Hannah Kirk. For services to Holocaust Education.
- Robert Samuel Kirk. For services to Holocaust Education.
- Alison Jane Kitson, District Nurse, Cumbria Partnership NHS Foundation Trust. For services to Nursing.
- Terence Arthur Knights. Civilian Instructor, Exmouth Squadron, RAF Air Cadets. For voluntary service to Young People and the community in Exmouth.
- Subramaniam Chettiar Kugasenan Chettiar (Raj Chettiar). For services to the Tamil community in West London.
- Santosh Diwarkanath Kundi. For services to Education and charity in the UK and Abroad.
- Mary Winifred Lambert, School Governor, Broad Heath Primary School. For services to Education.
- Norman George Larke, chairman, Chatteris Branch, The Royal British Legion. For voluntary service to the ex-Service community in Cambridgeshire.
- Shamsa Jabeen Latif. For services to Disadvantaged People in South Yorkshire.
- James Thomas Laverty. For services to Swimming and Disability Sport.
- Rhiannon Katherine Lawrence, Chair of Governors, Curzon C of E Combined School, Buckinghamshire. For services to Education.
- Mark Edward Le Sage. For voluntary service to the community and to the Rehabilitation of Offenders.
- Kathleen Emily Lee, Nurse, Medident, Muscat, Oman. For services to the health and welfare of British nationals overseas
- Marion Levett, Project Manager, Women4Women. For services to Women in Abusive Situations and the community in Clackmannanshire.
- Ruzena Levy, For services to Holocaust Education.
- Eileen Joyce Lindsay. Dance Teacher, The Lindsay School of Dance. For services to Dance and the community in North East Scotland.
- Martin Stephen Lown, Group Commander, Hereford and Worcester Fire and Rescue Service. For services to The Fire Fighters Charity.
- Karen Jane Macaulay. For voluntary service to Lancashire Constabulary.
- Christina Fraser MacDonald, Member, Carnoustie Branch, Royal British Legion Scotland. For voluntary service to Veterans and the community in Carnoustie.
- Katherine Ruth Macpherson. For voluntary service to Women's Running in County Durham.
- Irene Nora Elizabeth Macwilliam. For services to Textile Art in Northern Ireland.
- Colin Philip Magill. For services to Local Government and the community in County Down.
- Ruth Elizabeth Maltman TD DL. For services to the community in Glasgow.
- Dr. Maryanne Zonia Ajanthini Mariyaselvam, National Innovation Accelerator Fellow, Clinical Research Fellow, Queen Elizabeth Hospital King's Lynn NHS Trust and University of Cambridge. For services to Healthcare.
- John Campbell Martin. For services to the Farming community in Northern Ireland.
- Kathleen Margaret Martin. For services to the community in Chalfont St Giles.
- Jill May, Member and Fundraiser, Cancer Research UK. For services to Cancer Research UK.
- Jane Elizabeth Mayo, chairman, Campbeltown Community Business Ltd, Cambeltown Picture House. For services to Cultural Heritage, Business and charity in Argyll and Bute.
- Hazel Davina McAllan, chair, Balnagask Community Centre. For services to the community in Aberdeen.
- Thomas McArdle, Street Cleansing Operative. For services to the community in Liverpool.
- Peter Michael McCartney. For services to the community in Merseyside.
- Andrew McClarty. For services to charity.
- Denise McCunnell – For services to Victims of Sexual Abuse.
- Susan McDonald. Director, Active Communities (Scotland) Limited. For services to Community Sport, Health and Wellbeing in Renfrewshire.
- Robert Alastair McFarland, Head of Technology, Limavady High School. For services to Education and the community in Londonderry.
- Breda McGrenaghan. For services to Cancer Patients in County Fermanagh.
- Philip McGrenaghan. For services to Cancer Patients in County Fermanagh.
- Brendan McInerney. For services to Volunteering, the Public Sector and the community in Gloucestershire.
- Christina Elizabeth McIntosh. For services to the Environment and the community in Alness, Ross-shire.
- George Clarke McLaughlin. For services to the Northern Ireland Fire Brigade and voluntary service to the community in Limavady.
- Sally Theresa Anne McMahon. For services to Libraries.
- Francis Joseph McNally, Deputy Principal, Department for Infrastructure, Northern Ireland Executive. For services to Government in Northern Ireland and Prostate Cancer Awareness.
- Alexandra McNaul. Nursery Assistant, Kylemore Nursery School. For services to Education and to the community in Portrush, Northern Ireland.
- Robert McQuillan. For services to Music in Ballymena.
- Roger Stanford Mead. For charitable services in Cornwall.
- Norman Mellor. For services to charity in Huddersfield.
- James Alfred Edward Mercer. For services to Young People and Football in County Armagh.
- Elizabeth Milne, co-director, Phoenix Theatre. For services to Theatre and the Arts in the North East of Scotland.
- John Charles Minor. For services to Community Support and Cohesion.
- Karen Mitchell, Lead Cancer Nurse, Oxford University Hospitals NHS Foundation Trust. For services to Cancer Patients and Nursing.
- William Henderson Moore. For services to People with Special Educational Needs in Ellesmere Port.
- Diana Ruth Moran. For charitable services.
- Phillips Montague Mosscrop. For services to the community in Macclesfield.
- David Macaulay Murray, Emergency Response and First Aid volunteer, British Red Cross. For voluntary service to the Red Cross.
- Sarah Neil. For services to the Trichorhinophalangeal Syndrome Support Group.
- Michael Kenneth Nicholls. For services to the community in Selsey, West Sussex.
- Hayley Nortcliffe, Sergeant, West Yorkshire Police. For services to Policing.
- Mary Isobel Nunn, Lately Nursing Officer, Tiverton Division, St John Ambulance. For voluntary service to First Aid Provision in Devon.
- David Overton, Volunteer, Suffolk Special Constabulary Recruitment. For services to Policing and the community in Suffolk.
- James Edward Packham, Immigration Officer, Home Office. For services to National Security.
- Nicholas John Palmer, lately Counter Terrorism and Extremism Liaison Officer, Tunis, Tunisia. For services to British nationals overseas and justice.
- Harold Clifford Panton. For services to Heritage in Lincolnshire.
- Simon Colin Neil Paul. For services to the community in Lechlade on Thames, Gloucestershire.
- Graham Peart. For services to the community in High Wycombe, Buckinghamshire.
- Kay Penkethman. For services to Homeless People in Liverpool.
- Dr. Brian Frank Perry. For services to the community in Chertsey, Surrey.
- Barbara Jean Pettegree, Founder and Manager, The Rosemary Foundation. For services to End of Life Care.
- Molly Cecilia Poulter. For services to the community in Maidstone, Kent.
- Judith Marion Povey. For voluntary service to Girlguiding and the community in Alderley Edge, Cheshire.
- Pamela Jane Powell, Chair of Governors, Chapel St Leonards Primary School, Grantham Additional Needs Fellowship and Woodlands Academy, Spilsby, Lincolnshire. For services to Education.
- John Stephen Pownceby. For services to School Athletics in Cumbria.
- Carol Prowse. For services to the Arts and the community in Derbyshire.
- Gillian Punt. For services to Charitable Fundraising.
- Rebecca Ramsay. For services to the Prevention of Water Related Accidents.
- Mark Andrew Ranola, Police Constable, Hampshire Constabulary. For services to Policing and the community in Hampshire.
- Keith John Rawlings. For services to charity.
- Carol Reed. For services to Save the Children and the community in Canterbury.
- Peter Leslie Reed. For services to Education and voluntary First Aid work at the University of Sussex.
- Graham Reid, Guidance Manager, HM Revenue and Customs. For services to charity in Glasgow.
- Rachael Renihan, Executive Assistant to the British Ambassador, British Embassy, Muscat, Oman. For services to UK/Oman relations.
- Amanda Richard. For services to the Health and Wellbeing of Older People in the Scottish Borders.
- Roberta Richmond. For services to Mental Health in East Belfast.
- Alan John Robertson. For voluntary service to Kingussie Camanachd Club.
- Emily May Robertson, Ward Sister, Older Person's Care, Manchester University NHS Foundation Trust. For services to Nursing.
- Michael Antony Robertson, Conductor, Carnoustie and District Youth Brass Band. For services to Music in Angus.
- Dr. Leonard Arthur Robinson. For voluntary service to the community in South Cumbria.
- Wilfred Andrew Hiram Robinson. For services to the community in County Tyrone.
- Andrew Roby. For services to Reducing Deforestation.
- Kevin Timothy Routledge. For services to Sport and the community in Leicester.
- Carole Ann Ryan, Lately Listing Adviser, Historic England. For services to the Historic Environment, Conservation and Cultural Heritage.
- Helen Dora Sadler. For services to the community in Chester.
- Erica Sarney. For services to Wildflower and Pollinator Conservation in Lancashire.
- John Satterthwaite. For services to the community in Blucher, Newcastle upon Tyne.
- Allan Schiller. For services to Music and charity.
- Jeffrey David Scholes. For services to Young People and charity.
- Matthew Thomas Scott, Senior Warden, Warwick University. For services to Students and the community in Warwick.
- Terri Scott. For services to the Solihull Troubled Families Programme.
- Richard Searling. For services to the Soul Music Industry and the community in the North of England.
- Thomas James Servis. For voluntary and charitable services.
- William James King Shaw. For voluntary and charitable service in Belfast.
- Lauren Shea. For services to Promoting Science, Technology, Engineering and Mathematics to Young People.
- Michael Albert Shea. For services to Foodbank in Farnborough.
- Susan Diane Shea. For services to Foodbank in Farnborough.
- Ian Kenneth Grant Sherriff, Academic Partnership Lead for Dementia, University of Plymouth. For services to People affected by Dementia.
- David Wilson Shields. For services to Music and Amateur Dramatics in Northern Ireland.
- Lesley Ann Sim. For services to Libraries.
- Ernest Simon. For services to Holocaust Education and Remembrance.
- Lynn Rae Simpson, Head Coach, Flyers Trampoline Club and chair, Trampoline and Tumbling Technical Panel. For services to Trampolining.
- Sarah Frances Simpson, Estates Clerk, Tidworth, Netheravon and Bulford Garrison. For services to the Army and the community in Wiltshire.
- Emma Slater, Head of Music, West Lodge School, Kent. For services to Education.
- Brian Sleight. For services to Scouting and the community in Fleet, Wisbech and Spalding.
- May Glassford Smith, Fundraiser, National Society for the Prevention of Cruelty to Children. For charitable service.
- Tony Spruce, Lately Police Community Support Officer, Cheshire Constabulary. For services to Policing and the community in Cheshire.
- Maurice Noach Stone. For services to Dance and Community Cohesion.
- Stephen Stone. For services to Wildlife Conservation.
- Austin John William Stronge, For services to the welfare of former Royal Ulster Constabulary Officers and their Families in Northern Ireland.
- Alison Suffield, Constable, Lancashire Police. For services to Policing.
- Brian Thomas Sullivan. For services to charity and the Performing Arts.
- Janet Edith Marion Swann. For services to People with Disabilities in Kent.
- Cecelia Taggart. For voluntary services to Scouts and the community in Downpatrick, County Down.
- Lee Tavinder. For services to Mental Health in Northern Ireland.
- John Fredrick Taylor. For services to Young People through Scouting.
- Glyn Thomas, Paramedic, Welsh Ambulance Service and St John Cymru Wales. For services to Pre-Hospital Care in North Wales.
- Heather Mary Thomas. For services to The Goboka Rwanda Trust and the community in Bakewell, Derbyshire
- Judith Margaret Thomas (Judith Burton), Lately Chair, Sutton Music Festival. For services to Music in Sutton.
- Dr. Geoffrey Michael Thompson. For services to the Rural Youth in Northern Ireland.
- James Alexander Thompson. For services to the community in Alnwick, Northumberland.
- Clark Tracey, Jazz Musician. For services to Music and the Promotion of Jazz.
- Yelèna Travis-Powell, Investigations Officer, National Crime Agency. For services to Law Enforcement and Diversity.
- Martin Roger Trepte. For services to the Newspaper Industry and to charity.
- June Elizabeth Trevithick. For services to the community in Callington, Cornwall.
- Geshe Tashi Tsering. For services to Buddhism in the UK.
- Sarah Jane Turner, Governance and Reporting Lead, Immigration Enforcement, Home Office. For services to the community in Croydon.
- Heather Unwin. For services to the community in Preston, Lancashire.
- Christopher Melroy Vallimae, Postman, Weston Super Mare. For services to the community in North Somerset.
- Adriaan Petrus Charles Van Zyl, Warden, St Andrews Church. For services to the community in London.
- Alan Neil Vollans. For voluntary service to Cricket and the community in South Yorkshire and Nottinghamshire.
- George Hans Vulkan. For services to Holocaust Education and Remembrance.
- Dr. Jessica Alice Feinmann Wade, Research Physicist, Blackett Laboratory, Imperial College London. For services to Gender Diversity in Science.
- Brian Wallace Waters. For services to the community in Preston, Hertfordshire.
- George Martyn Welch. For voluntary service to the community in South Cumbria.
- Sean Richard Wheeler. For charitable service.
- Dr. Lorraine Whewell. For voluntary service in the UK and Abroad.
- Yvonne Tina White, Equalities Officer, UNISON. For services to Equality and Diversity on the Isle of Wight.
- Muriel Doreen Wilkinson, chair, Magenta Living, Wirral Residents Umbrella Association. For services to Housing.
- Patricia Maura Williams. For services to the community in Wales.
- Sandra Elizabeth Williams. For services to the community in the Vale of Glamorgan.
- Guy Everis Williamson. For services to Boxing and the community in London.
- Rachael Wilson (Rachael Sarjantson), Senior Officer, HM Prison Hull. For services to Prisoners and their Families.
- Frederick Michael Douglas Witty, Retired. For services to the British community in Catalonia, Spain
- Dorothy Anne Wonnacott. For public and political service.
- Janet Wood. For services to Girlguiding and Young Women in Lancashire.
- Yvonne Dorothy Woodcock. For services to the community in Doncaster, South Yorkshire.
- Susan Woodward. For services to Disability Swimming.
- Jill Wright. For voluntary service to Athletics in Berkshire.
- Ernest Young. Conductor and Choirmaster. For services to Music.

Crown Dependencies

Isle of Man

- Vincent Fox. For services to medical charities and the community.

Jersey

- Richard Richomme. For services to overseas aid.

=== Royal Red Cross ===
==== Members of the Royal Red Cross, First Class (RRC) ====
Military

- Lieutenant Colonel Deborah Louise Inglis, TD, VR, Queen Alexandra's Royal Army Nursing Corps, Army Reserve

=== Queen's Police Medal (QPM) ===
England and Wales

- Constable Firzana Ahmed – West Yorkshire Police
- Warren Barlow – Lately, Detective Constable, Greater Manchester Police
- Detective Chief Superintendent Kathryn Louise Barnes – Thames Valley Police
- Temporary Chief Superintendent Simon Justin Barraclough – Greater Manchester Police
- David Clement – Lately, Sergeant, Northumbria Police
- Commander Jane Connors – Metropolitan Police Service
- Commander Stuart Cundy – Metropolitan Police Service
- Lee Carl Davenport – Lately, Chief Superintendent, West Mercia Police
- Detective Constable Christopher Mark Davison – Metropolitan Police Service
- Constable Simon Fahey – Surrey Police
- Deputy Chief Constable Sara Glen – Hampshire Constabulary
- Chief Constable Michael Trevor Griffiths – Civil Nuclear Constabulary
- Detective Superintendent David Malyn – North Yorkshire Police
- Temporary Chief Superintendent John Joseph McDermott – Kent Police
- Temporary Chief Constable John Robins – West Yorkshire Police
- Chief Constable Stephen Watson – South Yorkshire Police
- Christine Williams – Lately, Detective Constable, Avon & Somerset Police
- Alec Wood – Lately, Chief Constable, Cambridgeshire Constabulary

Northern Ireland

- Ronald Charles Edwin Galwey – Lately, Detective Constable, PSNI
- Jeremy Andrew Harris – Lately, Deputy Chief Constable, PSNI
- Chief Superintendent Jonathan Stewart Roberts – PSNI

Overseas

- Deputy Commissioner Paul Michael Wright – Bermuda Police Service

=== Queen's Fire Service Medal (QFSM) ===
England and Wales

- Malcolm Livingstone Cowie – Lately, Watch Manager, Kent Fire and Rescue Service.
- Chief Fire Officer Mark Hardingham – Suffolk Fire and Rescue Service.
- Chief Fire Officer Paul Hedley – Northumberland Fire and Rescue Service.
- Group Manager Jeremy Peter Leonard – Hampshire Fire and Rescue Service.
- Watch Manager Joanne Stephens – USAR Team & Incident Investigation Team, Merseyside Fire and Rescue Service.

=== Queen's Ambulance Service Medal (QAM) ===
England and Wales

- Deborah Joanne Goldsmith – Assistant Emergency Medical Services Controller – Welsh Ambulance Services NHS Trust.
- Grayham Gareth McLean – Unscheduled Care Lead – Welsh Ambulance Services NHS Trust.
- Paul Robert Nicholson – Assistant Director IM&T, North East Ambulance Service.
- Steven John Wheaton – Assistant Chief Ambulance Officer – West Midlands Ambulance Service.

Northern Ireland

- Jacqueline Mary O’Hara – Paramedic Station Supervisor – Northern Ireland Ambulance Service.

=== Queen's Volunteer Reserves Medal (QVRM) ===
- Lieutenant Commander David Cooper, RD, Royal Naval Reserve
- Lieutenant Colonel Graham Norman Cox, VR, The Rifles, Army Reserve
- Corporal Lisa Jane Ingram, VR, The Royal Logistic Corps, Army Reserve
- Lieutenant Colonel John Robert Longbottom, MBE, VR, The Honourable Artillery Company Territorial Army
- Warrant Officer Class 2 Ian Donald Westall, VR, The Parachute Regiment, Army Reserve

== Crown Dependencies ==
Guernsey

- Andrew Ozanne OBE
- Edric Baker MBE
- Gary Le Poidevin Royal Victorian Medal (Silver)

Jersey

- Julian Clyde-Smith OBE
- Joan Richard MBE
- Imogen Nicholls MBE
- Richard Richomme BEM

Isle of Man

- Stephen Rodan OBE
- Tonia Lushington MBE
- Ivor Ramsden MBE
- Tony Fox BEM

== Australia ==
The 2019 Queen's Birthday Honours for Australia were announced on 10 June 2019 by the Governor-General, Sir Peter Cosgrove.

== Canada ==
The 2019 Canada Day Honours were announced on 29 June 2019 by the Governor General of Canada, the Right Honourable Julie Payette.

== New Zealand ==
The 2019 Queen's Birthday Honours for New Zealand were announced on 3 June 2019 by the Governor-General, Dame Patsy Reddy.

== Cook Islands ==
Below are the individuals appointed by Elizabeth II in her right as Queen of the Cook Islands, on the recommendation of the Ministers of the Cook Islands.

=== Order of the British Empire ===
==== Officer of the Order of the British Empire (OBE) ====
Civil

- Unakea Kauvai – For services to the community.

==== Member of the Order of the British Empire (MBE) ====
Civil

- Ake Te Ariki Lewis – For her contribution to public services and the community.

=== British Empire Medal (BEM) ===
Civil

- Vaine Teremoana Upokoina Mingi – For services to the community.
- Tangaina Pattia – For services to the community.

== Barbados ==
Below are the individuals appointed by Elizabeth II in her right as Queen of Barbados, on advice of Her Majesty's Barbados Ministers.

=== Order of the British Empire ===
==== Commander of the Order of the British Empire (CBE) ====
Civil

- George Spencer Griffith – For services in the fields of social work and reproductive health.
- Dr. Wendy Marlene Griffith-Watson – For service to education management and human resource development.

==== Officer of the Order of the British Empire (OBE) ====
Civil

- Shirley Aileen King – For her contribution to public services.
- Winston Walter Stafford – For services to social work and cricket administration.

==== Member of the Order of the British Empire (MBE) ====
Civil

- Rodney Dacourtney Prescod – For services to secondary school education.

== The Bahamas ==
Below are the individuals appointed by Elizabeth II in her right as Queen of the Commonwealth of The Bahamas, on the advice of Her Majesty's Bahamas Ministers.

=== Order of St Michael and St George ===
==== Knight Commander of the Order of St Michael and St George (KCMG) ====
- Frederick Asa Hazlewood, CMG – For services to business.

==== Companion of the Order of St Michael and St George (CMG) ====
- Paul Adlai Scavella, Pastor – For services to religion and community.

=== Order of the British Empire ===
==== Officer of the Order of the British Empire (CBE) ====
Civil

- Godfrey Brian Thomas – For services to business.

==== Member of the Order of the British Empire (MBE) ====
Civil

- James Randolph Bain, BEM – For services to business.
- Kingsley Livingstone Black – For services to education and labour.
- Dr. Christina Elizabeth Darville – For services to medicine and business.
- Julieth Naomi Minnis, Nurse – For services to health.
- Hugh Allison O’Brien – For services to the community.
- Olvin Peter Rees – For services to business.

=== British Empire Medal (BEM) ===
Civil

- Brian Berkley Brown – For services to the community.
- Nesbitt Alphonso Higgins – For services to politics.
- Robert John Roberts – For services to the community.
- Reverend Dr. Ifill Earlin Russel – For services to religion.
- Daniel Olander Sumner – For services to sports.
- Reverend Dr. James Samuel Sweeting – For services to civics and religion.

=== Queen's Police Medal (QPM) ===
- Paul Allison Rolle – For exceptional service in the Police Force.

== Grenada ==
Below are the individuals appointed by Elizabeth II in her right as Queen of Grenada, on the advice of Her Majesty's Grenada Ministers.

=== Order of the British Empire ===
==== Commander of the Order of the British Empire (CBE) ====
Civil

- Claris Charles – For services to education, trade unionism and foreign affairs.

==== Officer of the Order of the British Empire (OBE) ====
Civil

- Dr. Michael Radix – For services to health and community service.

==== Member of the Order of the British Empire (MBE) ====
Civil

- Sylvia Nyack – For services to business and community service.

=== British Empire Medal (BEM) ===
Civil

- Raphael Anslem Johnson – For services to culture

== Papua New Guinea ==
Below are the individuals appointed by Elizabeth II in her right as Queen of Papua New Guinea, on the advice of Her Majesty's Papua New Guinea Ministers.

=== Knight Bachelor ===
- Walter Oma Nombe – For services to the community of the Eastern Highlands in the roles of Member, Minister and Premier of the Provincial Government.

=== Order of St Michael and St George ===
==== Companion of the Order of St Michael and St George (CMG) ====
- The Honourable Job Pomat – For services to the community and as a Member of National Parliament including as Minister and currently as Speaker of Parliament.
- The Honourable Joseph Malinu Yagi – For services to law, the community and the judiciary as a Senior Judge in the National and Supreme Courts of Papua New Guinea.

=== Order of the British Empire ===
==== Knight/Dame Commander of the Order of the British Empire (KBE/DBE) ====
Civil

- Sandra Geok Mei Lau, MBE – For services to commerce and the community through her philanthropic contribution in the areas of women and children welfare, education and health services.
- The Honourable John Thomas Pundari, CMG – For services to Papua New Guinea and the community as a Member of National Parliament and Speaker of Parliament.
- Datuk Kie Yik Wong – For services to commerce and the community through significant investment in rural business enterprises, human resource and infrastructure development.

==== Commander of the Order of the British Empire (CBE) ====
Civil

- Wayne Kenneth Golding, OBE – For services to commerce and trade promotion and the Asia-Pacific Economic Cooperation Leaders’ Summit 2018.
- James Sze Yuan Lau – For services to commerce, manufacturing, hospitality and property development.
- Peter Allan Lowing, OBE – For services to law, the legal profession and the community.
- Dr. Thomas Webster – For public service, research and policy development in education and law reform.

Military

- Colonel Mark Goina, OBE – For distinguished service to the Papua New Guinea Defence Force.

==== Officer of the Order of the British Empire (OBE) ====
Civil

- David Caradus – For services to commerce and taxation.
- Dr. Alois Daton – For contribution to public services, taxation and gender equality.
- Dr. Kulala Mulung – For services to the University of Technology, forestry and the environment.
- Dr. Ken Ngangan – For his contribution to public services and public financial management and governance reform.
- James Joseph Pang – For services to commerce, sport and the community.
- David Manoa Toua – For services to commerce, the Business Council and the Asia-Pacific Economic Cooperation Leaders’ Summit 2018.
- Robin Murray Woo – For services to manufacturing, the airline industry and the National Superannuation Fund

Military

- Colonel Albert Palaua – For loyal service to the Papua New Guinea Defence Force.

==== Member of the Order of the British Empire (MBE) ====
Civil

- Kamis Bira, Pastor – For services to the community and religion.
- Dennis William Bux – For services to business and the security industry.
- Monni Cross – For services to the Asia-Pacific Economic Cooperation Summit 2018.
- Derek Andrew Daubney – For services to Trukai, sport and the community.
- Fred Meraveka Eovo – For services to the church and the community.
- Mark Steven Foxe – For services to Australia-Papua New Guinea relations.
- Dr. Keith Kulakit Galgal – For services to agriculture research and agribusiness.
- Antonio Sodicta Go – For services to commerce and the fishing industry.
- Harriett Jack – For services to healthcare and the Good Samaritan Women Programme.
- Dr. Etami Betty Koka – For services to healthcare and the Enga community.
- Gustav Kraus – For services to the airline industry in the Pacific region.
- Kelvin Laki – For services to Emergency Disaster Relief.
- Leo Lemalu – For services to village court and the community.
- Carlistius Jason Mari’Bera – For services to karate.
- Anne Piwa Tarutia – For services to education, particularly for young children.
- Onnie Teio – For services to victims of sexual and family violence.
- Jethro Wala – For services to the Asia-Pacific Economic Cooperation Papua New Guinea Leaders’ Summit 2018.
- Julie Tagual Wialu – For services to rural healthcare.
- Lucas Yalipin – For services to the community.

Military

- Lieutenant Colonel Nicholas Henry – For service to the Papua New Guinea Defence Force.
- Lieutenant Colonel Francis Kari – For service to the Papua New Guinea Defence Force.
- Lieutenant Colonel John Wani – For service to the Papua New Guinea Defence Force.

=== Imperial Service Order (ISO) ===
- Alexis Oaengo Maino – For public service.
- Tambon Tara – For public service.

=== British Empire Medal (BEM) ===
Civil

- Roselyn Cecil Akua – For services to caring for abused women and children.
- Daniel Kulumini Apakia – For services to village court.
- Kwalam Apisah – For services to sport.
- Kapiya Ayare – For services to the community.
- Reverend Anna Besai – For services to the United Church and women's development.
- Superintendent Clement Dalla – For services to the Royal Papua New Guinea Constabulary.
- Rohu Gagai – For services to the community.
- Agatha Gawi – For services to education.
- Ilaita Gigimat – For services to basketball.
- Chief Inspector Laboi Ambrose Igak – For services to the Royal Papua New Guinea Constabulary.
- Ben Imal – For services to the Assemblies of God Church.
- Eva Vinun Jesse – For services to education.
- Rendey Kawage – For services to education.
- Elijah Koju – For services to the community.
- Sarufa Lakou – For services to education.
- Larry Lavai – For services to the East Sepik provincial administration.
- Aaron Luai – For public service.
- Detective Chief Sergeant Ulagis Mantu – For services to policing and the community.
- Siloe Mase – For services to the United Church.
- Hannah Bennett McManus – For services to gymnastics.
- Atai Mogola – For services to education.
- Hanna Ogi – For services to education and women's development.
- Jennifer Parina – For services to the National Research Institute.
- Jessie Piliwas – For public service.
- Sarenah Karess Pini – For services to sport.
- Raphael Nime Poka – For services to the community.
- John Umbu Pupu – For services to the community.
- Mark Reto – For services to the community.
- Monica Richard – For services to education and victims of sexual and family violence.
- Martha Sere – For services to Emergency Disaster Restoration.
- Tonny Sios – For services to the Seventh Day Adventist Church.
- Vere Tere-Apisah – For services to sport.
- Francis Posou Waitao – For services to the community.
- Hiob Tupeno Wekiko – For services to the Evangelical Lutheran Church.
- Biyu Yakipa – For services to rural healthcare.
- Stanley Tumun Yekep – For public service

Military

- Warrant Officer Robert Abba – For service to the Papua New Guinea Defence Force.
- Chief Warrant Officer Ricks Kandi – For service to the Papua New Guinea Defence Force.
- Chief Warrant Officer Pepena Pepena – For service to the Papua New Guinea Defence Force.
- Chief Warrant Officer Mark Sakei – For service to the Papua New Guinea Defence Force.
- Chief Warrant Officer Salestine Takendu – For service to the Papua New Guinea Defence Force.

=== Queen's Police Medal (QPM) ===
- Chief Superintendent Anthony Wagambie Junior – For service to the Royal Papua New Guinea Constabulary.
- Chief Superintendent John Kolopen – For service to the Royal Papua New Guinea Constabulary.
- Chief Superintendent Jimmy Onopia – For service to the Royal Papua New Guinea Constabulary.

== Solomon Islands ==
Below are the individuals appointed by Elizabeth II in her right as Queen of Solomon Islands, on the advice of Her Majesty's Solomon Island Ministers.

=== Order of St Michael and St George ===
==== Companion of the Order of St Michael and St George (CMG) ====
- Sia Kee Ching, MBE – For services to commerce and community development.
- The Honourable Justice Edwin Peter Goldsbrough – For services to the judiciary.
- Jeremy David Marshall – For services to commerce and community development.

=== Order of the British Empire ===
==== Officer of the Order of the British Empire (OBE) ====
Civil

- Ruth Liloqula – For her contribution to public services and community development.
- Adrian Edward Wickham – For services to commerce and community development.

==== Member of the Order of the British Empire (MBE) ====
Civil

- Harry Anigafutu – For services to rural and community development.
- Barnabas Baesodua – For services to rural and community development.
- David Shenman – For services in the Correctional Service of Solomon Islands.
- Matthew Varley – For services to the Royal Solomon Islands Police Force.

=== British Empire Medal (BEM) ===
Civil

- Michael Arisia – For services to rural and community development.
- James Manengelea – For services to vocational training and community development.
- Martha Sura – For services to rural and community development.
- Jenly Tegu Wini – For services to sport in the field of weightlifting.

=== Queen's Police Medal (QPM) ===
- Solomon Andrew Wala – For services to the Royal Solomon Islands Police Force.

== Saint Lucia ==
Below are the individuals appointed by Elizabeth II in her right as Queen of Saint Lucia, on the advice of Her Majesty's Saint Lucia Ministers.

=== Order of the British Empire ===
==== Commander of the Order of the British Empire (CBE) ====
Civil

- Rick Wayne, OBE – For services to entertainment, professional bodybuilding, advocacy and journalism.

==== Officer of the Order of the British Empire (OBE) ====
Civil

- Maher Chreiki – For services to business

==== Member of the Order of the British Empire (MBE) ====
Civil

- Dr. Owen Osbert Gabriel – For services to medicine.
- Cleo Gregory Lorde – For services to entrepreneurship and business.
- Margaret Roberts Steele – For services to broadcasting

=== British Empire Medal (BEM) ===
Civil

- Gaspard Alfred Peter David Charlemagne – For services to education.
- Pamela Mary Devaux – For services to charity.
- Joseph Reilly Dolcy – For services to the St. Lucia Fire Service.
- Vincent McDoom – For services to entertainment.
- Mary Pierre – For services to the community.
- Mary Joan Smith – For services to entrepreneurship and business.

== Belize ==
Below are the individuals appointed by Elizabeth II in her right as Queen of Belize, on the advice of Her Majesty's Belize Ministers.

=== Order of St Michael and St George ===
==== Companion of the Order of St Michael and St George (CMG) ====
- Audrey Joy Grant – For contribution to public services.

=== Order of the British Empire ===
==== Officer of the Order of the British Empire (OBE) ====
Civil

- Alistair Mickenzie King – For services to entrepreneurship.
- Lupita Quan – For her contribution to sport and business.

==== Member of the Order of the British Empire (MBE) ====
Civil

- Michele Leticia Irving – For her contribution to community service.
- Jeffery Ronald Locke – For his contribution to public services and the community.
- Maria De Lourdes Matus – For her contribution to education.
- Roland Yorke – For his contribution to community service.

== Antigua and Barbuda ==
Below are the individuals appointed by Elizabeth II in her right as Queen of Antigua and Barbuda, on the advice of Her Majesty's Antigua and Barbuda Ministers.

=== Order of the British Empire ===
==== Officer of the Order of the British Empire (OBE) ====
Civil

- Carmen Benjamin – For outstanding contribution to community development.

==== Member of the Order of the British Empire (MBE) ====
Civil

- Shirlene Andrea Nibbs – For outstanding contribution to community and tourism development.

== St Christopher and Nevis ==
Below are the individuals appointed by Elizabeth II in her right as Queen of Saint Christopher and Nevis, on the advice of Her Majesty's St Christopher and Nevis Ministers.

=== Order of the British Empire ===
==== Dame Commander of the Order of the British Empire (DBE) ====
Civil

- Constance Viola Mitcham – For her contribution to national development and the law.

==== Commander of the Order of the British Empire (CBE) ====
Civil

- Cameron Wilkinson – For his contribution to medicine.

==== Officer of the Order of the British Empire (OBE) ====
Civil

- Denzil Crooke – For his contribution to commerce and business development.

==== Member of the Order of the British Empire (MBE) ====
Civil

- Angeline Revan – For her contribution to education, community and public service.
- Elphlin Warner – For his contribution to calypso and musical development.

== See also ==
- Australian honours system
- New Zealand royal honours system
- Canadian Honours System
- Orders, decorations, and medals of the United Kingdom
- 2019 Canadian honours
