= Sandra Kerr (diversity adviser) =

Sandra Kerr CBE CBE
- Occupation: National Campaign Director for Business in the Community’s Race Equality campaign
- Organizations: Ethnic Minority Employment Stakeholder Group (EMESG); Royal Society Diversity Committee
- Known for: Race equality; Gender equality; Disability equality
- Board member of: Business in the Community Race Leadership Team; Cabinet Office Race Board

Sandra Kerr CBE is a race, gender, and disability business and policy advisor in the United Kingdom. Kerr is currently the Business in the Community's Race Equality Director and has worked in the Cabinet Office.

== Professional background ==
Between 1999 and 2003, Sandra Kerr worked in the Cabinet Office advising on policies on race, gender, disability, and work-life balance across Whitehall. Prior to this, Kerr worked in the Department for Work and Pensions delivering front-line services to 33,000 customers whilst also managing a team of 120 employees. Kerr also worked as a personal development and IT skills trainer.

After her time in the Cabinet Office, Kerr joined the Business in the Community Race Equality campaign as the National Campaign Director where she works with the race advisory board to set the agenda for issues around race and employment in the United Kingdom (UK).Between 2012 and 2016 Kerr chaired the Ethnic Minority Employment Stakeholder Group (EMESG), advising the Government on issues and employment barriers facing individuals from minority ethnic backgrounds.

In 2015, the Royal Society invited Sandra Kerr to become a member (2015-2021) of their Diversity Committee. In 2018, Sandra Kerr was named as one of the panelists comprising a Cabinet Office task-force to create a public leadership center.

== Key works ==
- Aspiration and Frustration (2010).
- Race into Higher Education (2011).
- Race and Recruitment (2012).
- Race at the Top (2014).
- Race at Work (2015).
- Race at Work 2018 Scorecard Report.> provided a one year on review of employer performance against the McGregor-Smith Review: Race in the workplace 2017.
- Race at Work Charter. Employers sign up to five key calls to action: Leadership; capturing ethnicity data; zero tolerance on bullying and harassment; managers promoting equality; and supporting the progression of ethnic minority employees in the workplace. the Race at Work Charter now has more than 500 employer signatories
- Race at Work Charter 2019-one year on report.
- Race at Work Charter 2020 report.
- Race at Work Black Voices Report was published in August 2020 to support in employers to take action to ensure they are including their black employees in the workplace and including black enterprise in their supply chains.

== Honours and awards ==
Kerr was appointed Officer of the Order of the British Empire (OBE) in 2012 for services to Black and minority ethnic people and Commander of the Order of the British Empire (CBE) in the 2019 Birthday Honours for services to equality and diversity.

In April 2015, she won the Women: Inspiration and Enterprise (WIE) Equality Award.
