= Rebecca Walton =

Regional director of the British Council

Rebecca Hay Elliot Walton CMG (born 1958) is a regional director of the British Council.

== Professional career ==
She was admitted as a Companion of the Order of St Michael and St George for services to UK cultural relations in the 2019 Birthday Honours.
