= Ruth Liloqula =

Solomon Islands civil servant

Ruth Liloqula is a government official and chief executive from the Solomon Islands.

== Biography ==
Liloquia completed a bachelor's degree in tropical agriculture from the University of Papua New Guinea and a master's degree in the biotechnology of crop protection majoring in nematology from a university in Britain. She was the first Solomon Islander to hold the posts of Government Plant Pathologist and Director of Research in the Ministry of Agriculture. She has also held the positions of Permanent Secretary Ministry of Police, and National Security. In 2007 she was appointed a Secretary to Cabinet, becoming the first woman to hold such a position.

Liloqula is the chief executive of Transparency Solomon Islands, a non-governmental organisation focused on promoting anti-corruption measures in the country. In 2019, she won the Transparency International Amalia Award in the Professional Excellence category from Transparency International.

=== Publications ===
- Liloqula, R., Pollard, A. A., & Australian National University. (2000). Understanding conflict in Solomon Islands: A practical means to peacemaking. Canberra, ACT, Australia: Australian National University, Research School of Pacific and Asian Studies.
