= John Mackechnie =

Scottish artist

John Mackechnie, MBE RSA, (born 19 August 1949) is an artist from Glasgow, Scotland. He began his career as a 15-year-old copy boy in the Glasgow newspaper trade, following in his father's footsteps.

== Education ==
He attended Croftfoot Primary School in Glasgow, followed by Broomhill Primary and went on to study at Hyndland Secondary School in the west end of Glasgow. He graduated in Drawing & Painting from Glasgow School of Art in 1971, before going on to Postgraduate Studies in printmaking at Brighton Polytechnic, now known as University of Brighton.

== Career ==
John was a printmaking tutor at Newcastle Polytechnic, now the University of Northumbria from 1973 -1978, until returning to Glasgow Print Studio in 1978 to take up a post as an evening class tutor, he then became the Workshop Manager and from January 1983 until April 2023, Director.

He exhibits throughout the UK and internationally in solo and group exhibitions. He utilises photography and technology in printmaking and was at the forefront of the development of multi plate colour etching, developing what is now known as the 'Etching-Glasgow Style', an exhibition of that name was held at Glasgow Print Studio in 1984. (alongside Jonathan Robertson and Dawson Murray)

Since 1999 his technique of choice has been screenprinting.

His subject matter includes Skyscraper reflections, Hebridean waters, and American classic cars and American urban landscapes.

== Honours ==
He was elected to the Royal Scottish Academy in 2005 and was recognised for his services to Art in the Queen's Birthday Honours List 2019

== Personal life ==
In 1975 John married the artist Sue Mackechnie. In an interview in 2020 John stated that he "couldn't have done any of it without the support of my wife."
