= Foreman (surname) =

Foreman is a surname. Notable people with the surname include:

== A–E ==
- Al Foreman (1904–1954), English-Canadian boxer
- Amanda Foreman (disambiguation), multiple people
- Anne N. Foreman (born 1947), American diplomat, lawyer, and businesswoman
- Aricka Foreman, American poet, essayist, and digital curator
- Brownie Foreman (1875–1926), American baseball player
- Carl Foreman (1914–1984), American screenwriter and film producer
- Carolyn T. Foreman (1872–1967), Resident and Historian of American state of Oklahoma, wife of fellow historian Grant Foreman
- Chris Foreman (born 1956), English musician, singer-songwriter, and composer
- Chris Foreman (organist), American jazz organist
- Chuck Foreman (born 1950), American football player
- Dale Foreman, American politician and attorney
- Dan Foreman (born 1953), American politician
- Darren Foreman (disambiguation), multiple people
- David Foreman (1946–2022), American environmentalist
- Deborah Foreman (born 1962), American actress
- Denis Foreman (1933–2016), South African cricketer and footballer
- Dominic Foreman (1933–2020), Australian politician
- Donald Bruce Foreman (1945–2004), Australian botanist
- D'Onta Foreman (born 1996), American football player
- Earl Foreman (1924–2017), American lawyer and sports executive
- Ed Foreman (1933–2022), American politician
- Edward Foreman (1937–2018), American opera singer
- Edward R. Foreman (1808–1885), American meteorologist
- Eileen Foreman, British football player

== F–J ==
- Ferris Foreman (1808–1901), American lawyer, politician, and soldier
- Frank Foreman (1863–1957), American baseball player
- Freddie Foreman (1932–2026), English criminal
- George Foreman (disambiguation), multiple people
- Gordy Foreman, drummer of the band Frenzal Rhomb
- Grant Foreman (1869–1953), Resident and Historian of American state of Oklahoma, husband of fellow historian Carolyn T. Foreman
- Gregg Foreman, American musician and DJ
- Happy Foreman (1899–1953), American baseball player
- Henry Foreman (1852–1924), British politician
- Hooks Foreman (1895–1940), American baseball player
- Ian Foreman (1930–2021), Australian rules footballer
- Jack Foreman Mantle (1917–1940), English recipient of the Victoria Cross
- James Foreman (disambiguation), multiple people
- Jamie Foreman (born 1958), English actor
- Jay Foreman (disambiguation), multiple people
- John Foreman (disambiguation), multiple people
- Jon Foreman (born 1976), American musician
- Jonathan Foreman (journalist) (born 1965), British journalist
- Joseph Foreman (musician) (born 1974), American rapper and musician known as Afroman
- Joseph Foreman (athlete) (1935–1999), Canadian sprinter

== L–Z ==
- Laura Foreman (dancer) (1937–2001), American dancer and choreographer
- Laura Foreman (journalist) (1943–2021), American journalist and editor
- Lewis Foreman (born 1941), British author and musicologist
- Lynette Foreman (born 1957), Australian hurdler
- Matt Foreman (activist), American activist
- Matthew Foreman (born 1957), American mathematician
- Michael Foreman (disambiguation), multiple people
- Milton J. Foreman (1863–1935), American general
- Paul Foreman (1939–2020), Jamaican long jumper
- Percy Foreman (1902–1988), American lawyer
- Richard Foreman (1937–2025), American playwright and avant-garde theater pioneer
- Rob Foreman (born 1984), New Zealand rugby union player
- Sean Foreman (born 1985), American musician
- Shawn Foreman (born 1975), American football player
- Tim Foreman (born 1978), American musician
- Tom Foreman (born 1959), American journalist
- Travel Foreman (born 1982), American comics artist
- Wally Foreman (1948–2006), Australian sports administrator and commentator
- Wayne Foreman (born 1955), Australian rules footballer
- William Foreman (1726–1777), colonial American military officer
- Yuri Foreman (born 1980), Israeli boxer

== Fictional characters ==
- Eric Foreman, a character in the television series House
- Susan Foreman, a character in the television series Doctor Who

== See also ==
- Annie Foreman-Mackey (born 1991), Canadian cyclist
- Justin Wright-Foreman (born 1997), American basketball player
