= Furman =

Furman may refer to:

== Places ==
- Furman, Alabama, an unincorporated community in Wilcox County, United States
- Furman, South Carolina, a town in Hampton County, United States
- Furman, Alberta, Canada
- Furman, Poland
- Furman Bluffs, Marie Byrd Land, Antarctica
- Furman Historic District, a historic district in the community of Furman, Alabama, United States

== Other ==
- Furman (surname), including a list of people with the name
- Furman, a unit of angular measure equal to 1/65536 (2^{−16}) of a circle and named for Alan T. Furman
- Furman v. Georgia, a United States Supreme Court decision that temporarily abolished capital punishment in the U.S.
- Furman Center for Real Estate and Urban Policy, a joint center at New York University School of Law and the NYU Wagner School of Public Service
- Furman University, Greenville, South Carolina

== See also ==
- Forman (disambiguation)
- Foreman (disambiguation)
- Fuhrman, a surname
- Furmanov (disambiguation)
