= Forman (name) =

Forman is a given name and an English, Czech, or German surname of multiple possible origins. In Old Czech language, it is a borrowing from German and meaning "coachman", "carter". In English, it is may be a spelling variant of "foreman", while in German it may be a variant of "Vormann", also "foreman". The feminine form of the Czech surname is Formanová. Notable people with the surname include:

== Surname ==
- A. G. Forman CBE (1910–1967), Chief of Naval Staff of the Ghana Navy
- Al Forman (1928–2013), baseball umpire
- Alexander A. Forman (1843–1922), American soldier in the American Civil War
- Alison Forman (born 1969), Australian soccer player
- Andrew Forman (1465–1521), Scottish diplomat and Archbishop
- Antonie Formanová, Czech actress
- Arthur Forman (1850–1905), English schoolmaster and cricketer
- Bill Forman (baseball) (1886–1958), baseball player
- Bill Forman (radio) (1915–?), radio announcer and actor
- Bruce Forman (born 1956), American jazz guitarist
- Carol Forman (1918–1997), American actress
- Charles William Forman (1821–1894), Presbyterian missionary in Pakistan
- Christine Jones Forman, American astrophysicist
- Craig Forman (born 1961), CEO of McClatchy
- David Forman (general) (1745–1797), brigadier general of New Jersey militia
- Denis Forman (1917–2013), Scottish television executive
- Donnie Forman (1926–2018), American basketball player
- Frank Forman (1875–1961), English footballer
- Fred Forman (1873–1910), English footballer
- Frederick Forman (1884–1960), English cricketer
- Gar Forman, American basketball executive
- Gayle Forman (born 1978), American young adult fiction author
- George V. Forman (1841–1922), founder of VanderGrift, Forman & Company
- Harrison Forman (1904–1978), American photographer and journalist
- Harry Buxton Forman CB (1842–1917), Victorian-era bibliographer and antiquarian bookseller
- Henry James Forman (1879–1966), author famous for his 1933 book Our Movie Made Children
- Henry Jay Forman, professor at the USC Leonard Davis School of Gerontology
- Howard Forman (politician) (1946–2023), American politician in the state of Florida
- Humphrey Forman (1888–1923), English cricketer
- Ira Forman (born 1952), director of the National Jewish Democratic Council
- James Forman (1928–2005), figure in the Civil Rights Movement
- James Henry Forman (1896–1972), Canadian military aviator
- Joey Forman (1929–1982), American comedian and comic actor
- John Forman (British politician) (1884–1975), British insurance agent and politician
- John Forman (martyr), Protestant martyr burned at the stake in East Grinstead, England in 1556
- John Forman (Nova Scotia politician) (1798–1832), Canadian lawyer, judge and political figure
- John Forman (sport shooter) (1925–1998), American sports shooter
- John Forman (trade unionist) (1823–1900), British trade unionist
- Justus Miles Forman (1875–1915), American novelist and playwright
- L. J. Forman (1855–1933), Republican President of the West Virginia Senate
- Lewis Leonard Forman (1929–1998), British botanist
- Ludmila Formanová, Czech middle-distance runner
- Melissa Forman (born 1970), American radio and TV personality
- Miloš Forman (1932–2018), Czech film director, screenwriter, actor, and professor
- Miriam Forman, American astrophysicist
- Miroslav Forman (born 1990), Czech ice hockey player
- Mitchel Forman (born 1956), jazz and fusion keyboard player
- Nigel Forman (1943–2017), British Conservative politician
- Oscar Forman (born 1982), Australian basketball player
- Paul Forman (historian) (born 1937), American historian
- Paul Forman (actor), English-French actor
- Peter Forman (born 1958), CEO of the South Shore (MA) Chamber of Commerce
- Phillip Forman (1895–1978), American lawyer and judge
- Rab Forman, Scottish solicitor and Conservative Party politician
- Ric Forman, American winemaker, vineyard manager and consultant
- Richard Forman, landscape ecologist
- Robert Forman (died 1530), late medieval Scottish churchman
- Robert K. C. Forman, professor of religion at the City University of New York
- Ron Forman (born 1948), head of the Audubon Nature Institute
- Ruth Forman, American poet
- Sadie Forman (1929–2014), South African teacher, librarian and anti-apartheid activist
- Simon Forman (1552–1611), Elizabethan astrologer, occultist and herbalist
- Sol Forman (1903–2001), American restaurateur
- Stanley Forman (born 1945), American photojournalist
- Terry Forman (born 1948), Australian rugby player
- Thomas Forman (priest) (1885–1965), Archdeacon of Lindisfarne
- Thomas Forman (reformer) (1493–1528), early English reformer, President of Queens' College, Cambridge
- Thomas Marsh Forman (1809–1875), Confederate politician
- Tom Forman (actor) (1893–1926), American film actor, director, writer, and producer
- Tom Forman (cartoonist) (1936–1996), American comic strip cartoonist
- Tom Forman (footballer) (1879–1911), footballer
- Tom Forman (producer), television producer
- Werner Forman (1921–2010), Czech photographer
- William St. John Forman (1847–1908), U.S. Representative from Illinois

== Given name ==
- Forman S. Acton (1920–2014), American computer scientist, engineer, educator and author
- Forman Brown (1901–1996), leader in puppet theatre, early gay novelist
- Ezekiel Forman Chambers (1788–1867), American politician
- William Forman Creighton (1909–1987), bishop of the Diocese of Washington
- Robb Forman Dew, American author
- Cornelius Forman Hatfield (1828–1910), merchant, shipbuilder, ship owner and political figure in Nova Scotia, Canada
- Robert Forman Horton (1855–1934), British Nonconformist divine, born in London
- Arthur Forman Balfour Paul (1875–1938), Scottish architect
- Frazier Forman Peters (1895–1963), American builder and architect specializing in stone houses
- Stanley Forman Reed (1884–1980), American attorney, US Solicitor General
- Robert Forman Six (1907–1986), CEO of Continental Airlines
- Forman Waye (1886–1967), Canadian merchant, machinist and political figure
- Joshua Forman Wilkinson (1798–1862), lawyer and first Postmaster of Bogardus Corners, Cossit's Corners and Salina in Central New York

== Fictional characters ==
- Eric, Kitty, Laurie, and Red Forman, in That '70s Show
