= Furrer =

Furrer is a German language topographic surname of Swiss origin, which means "cleft in the ground", derived from the Swiss word furre. Notable people with the surname include:

- Amanda Furrer (born 1991), American rifle shooter
- Beat Furrer (born 1954), Austrian composer
- Gaston Furrer (born 1945), Swiss ice hockey player
- Jonas Furrer (1805–1861), Swiss politician
- Nadja Furrer (born 1998), Swiss footballer
- Otto Furrer (1903–1951), Swiss alpine skier
- Philippe Furrer (born 1985), Swiss ice hockey player
- Reinhard Furrer (1940–1995), German scientist
- Will Furrer (born 1968), American football player

== See also ==
- Fuhrman
- Fuhrmann (disambiguation)
