= John Forman =

John Forman may refer to:

- John Forman (British politician) (1884–1975), British insurance agent and politician
- John Forman (Nova Scotia politician) (1798–1832), lawyer, judge and political figure in Nova Scotia
- John Forman (martyr) (died 1556), Protestant martyr
- John Forman (sport shooter) (1925–1998), American Olympic shooter
- John Forman (trade unionist) (1823–1900), British trade unionist

== See also ==
- John Foreman (disambiguation)
