= Furman (surname) =

Furman is a surname of a Polish-Jewish, Czech, Slovak, and Slovenian origin, a variation of Fuhrmann.

Notable people with the name include:

- Adam Nathaniel Furman (born 1982), British designer
- Ashrita Furman (born 1954), American holder of more than 160 Guinness world records
- Brad Furman (born 1975), American film director
- Dean Furman (born 1988), South African footballer
- Dmitri Furman (1943–2011), Russian political scientist
- Dominik Furman (born 1992), Polish footballer
- Ezra Furman (born 1986), American singer and songwriter
- James Furman Bisher (1918–2012), American sports writer
- Gabriel Furman (state senator) (1800–1854), New York politician and historian
- Jason Furman (born 1970), American economist
- Jesse M. Furman (born 1972), Federal judge for the Southern District of New York
- John C. Furman (c. 1856–1898), American financier
- Lucy Furman (1870–1958), American writer from Kentucky
- Maayan Furman-Shahaf (born 1986), Israeli high jumper and triple jumper
- Richard Furman (1755–1825), South Carolina Baptist minister, for whom Furman University is named
- Semyon Furman (1920–1978), Soviet chess grandmaster
- Simon Furman (born 1961), British comic book writer
- William Henry Furman, the defendant in the 1972 case of Furman v. Georgia
