= Forman =

Forman may refer to:

- Forman (name)
- Forman, North Dakota, city in Sargent County, North Dakota, US
- Forman, West Virginia, unincorporated community in Grant County, West Virginia, US
- Forman Glacier between Mount Franke and Mount Cole, in the Queen Maud Mountains of Antarctica
- Forman Park, in Syracuse, New York

== See also ==
- Brown-Forman Corporation
- 11333 Forman, an asteroid named for Miloš Forman
- H. Forman and Son, salmon smokehouse in London
- Forman School, in Litchfield, Connecticut, US
- Foreman (disambiguation)
- Furman (disambiguation)
