= Fuhrman =

Fuhrman is a surname, Anglicized from Fuhrmann. Notable people with the surname include:

- Chet Fuhrman (born 1951), American coach with the National Football League's Pittsburgh Steelers
- Chris Fuhrman (1960–1991), American novelist, author of The Dangerous Lives of Altar Boys
- Elina Fuhrman (born 1969), Russian-American travel and lifestyle journalist based in Los Angeles
- Isabelle Fuhrman (born 1997), American actress
- Joanna Fuhrman (born 1972), American poet and professor
- Joel Fuhrman, (born 1953), American author, physician, speaker, who advocates a "micronutrient-rich" diet
- Linn Fuhrman (1944–1994), American politician
- Mark Fuhrman (1952–2026), American law enforcement officer, author, and commentator
- Ollie Fuhrman (1896–1969), American Major League Baseball catcher
- Osmond Charles Fuhrman (1889–1961), Australian public servant and diplomat
- Paul T. Fuhrman (1883–1965), American farmer, businessman, and politician
- Robert A. Fuhrman (1925–2009), American engineer who developed the Polaris Missile and Poseidon missile
- Susan Fuhrman (born 1944), tenth president of Teachers College, Columbia University
