= Sackville College =

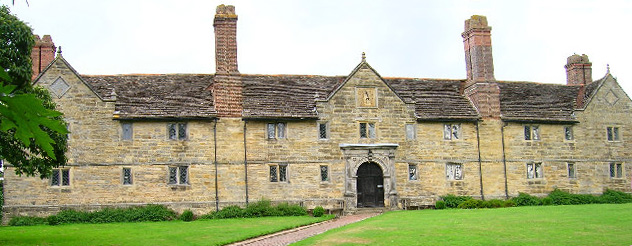
- Sackville College from the High street
- Interactive map of the Sackville College area

General information
- Status: Grade I listed
- Type: Almshouse
- Architectural style: Jacobean
- Location: East Grinstead, United Kingdom
- Coordinates: 51°07′29″N 0°00′15″W
- Opened: 1609
- Cost: £1,000

Technical details
- Material: Sandstone

Website
- Official site

Sackville College is a Jacobean almshouse in the town of East Grinstead, West Sussex, England.

It was founded in 1609 with money left by Robert Sackville, 2nd Earl of Dorset. Throughout its history it has provided sheltered accommodation for the elderly.

== Foundation ==
Robert Sackville left £1,000 for the building and a rent charge of £330, for the endowment of a 'hospital or college' for twenty-one poor men and ten poor women, to be under the patronage and government of his heirs. This may have been an imitation of Emanuel College, Westminster, founded by his aunt, Anne Fiennes, Lady Dacre. The building of the almshouse known as 'Sackville College for the Poor' at East Grinstead was commenced about 1616 by the executors, his brother-in-law, Lord William Howard, and Sir George Rivers of Chafford. It was occupied before 1622.

Most of the Sackville lands were soon alienated by the founder's son, and the buyers refused to acknowledge the estate's liability to the college. On 6 July 1631 the poor inmates received a charter of incorporation, but their revenues were still irregularly paid. But in 1700, after long litigation, a reduced rent charge was imposed on the Sackville estates on behalf of the college, and the number of inmates reduced to twelve, with a warden. The college buildings were restored in the nineteenth century by the Countess Amherst and the Countess De la Warr.

== Present charity ==
The College is run as a charity, operating under an Act of Parliament from 1624 and a royal charter from 1631. The College continues to receive patronage from William Sackville, 11th Earl De La Warr. The building is located at the end of the High Street close to St Swithun's Church.

It is built from local sandstone. The main building was completed in 1619, and remains exceptionally well preserved. The original lock is still used on the Chapel door and much furniture from the seventeenth and eighteenth centuries is preserved inside. It is a Grade I listed building. The building surrounds a courtyard which contains a well. The internal walls have large mullioned windows. The Great Hall features the original hammer-beam roof. Inside, the residences for the elderly have been modernized.

The College is run by a warden, who lives in part of the building that was originally used by the Sackville family on visits to their Sussex estates. The warden's office has not changed substantially since it was used by the Revd Dr John Mason Neale, who was warden from 1846 until his death in 1866. J.M. Neale was a hymn writer notable as the author of Good King Wenceslas. The warden's office is a good example of a Victorian study. The chapel was restored 1846–1866, in early C14 style by William Butterfield under the direction of Dr Neale.

The College is open Wednesday to Sunday during the summer.

== Notes ==
Attribution

This article incorporates text from a publication now in the public domain: "Sackville, Robert, second Earl of Dorset". Dictionary of National Biography. London: Smith, Elder & Co. 1885–1900.
