= Foreman =

A foreman, forewoman or foreperson is a supervisor, often in a manual trade or industry.

Foreman may also refer to:

== Supervisory roles ==
- Construction foreman, the worker or tradesman who is in charge of a construction crew
- Jury foreman, a head juror
- Ranch foreman, the manager of a ranch, overseeing all aspects of the operation
- Shop foreman or plant foreman, the frontline supervisor in a skilled trade, manufacturing or production operation
- Foreman of signals, a highly qualified senior non-commissioned signal equipment manager and engineer in the British Army's Royal Corps of Signals
- Road foreman of engines, a supervisor of locomotive engineers in the United States
- Railroad track foreman, the person in charge of daily activities of a crew related to duties involved in the construction, maintenance, inspection, and repair of railroad tracks in the United States

== Places ==
- Foreman, Arkansas, a city in the United States
- Foreman, Oklahoma, an unincorporated community in the United States
- Foreman, British Columbia, a community in Canada
- Foreman Glacier, Antarctica

== Other uses ==
- Foreman (software), a systems management software application
- Foreman (surname)
- The Foremen, a satirical folk music band
- USS Foreman (DE-633), a Buckley class destroyer escort of the United States Navy

== See also ==
- Forman (disambiguation)
- Furman (disambiguation)
