= Bereitschaftsleiter =

Political rank in the Nazi Party

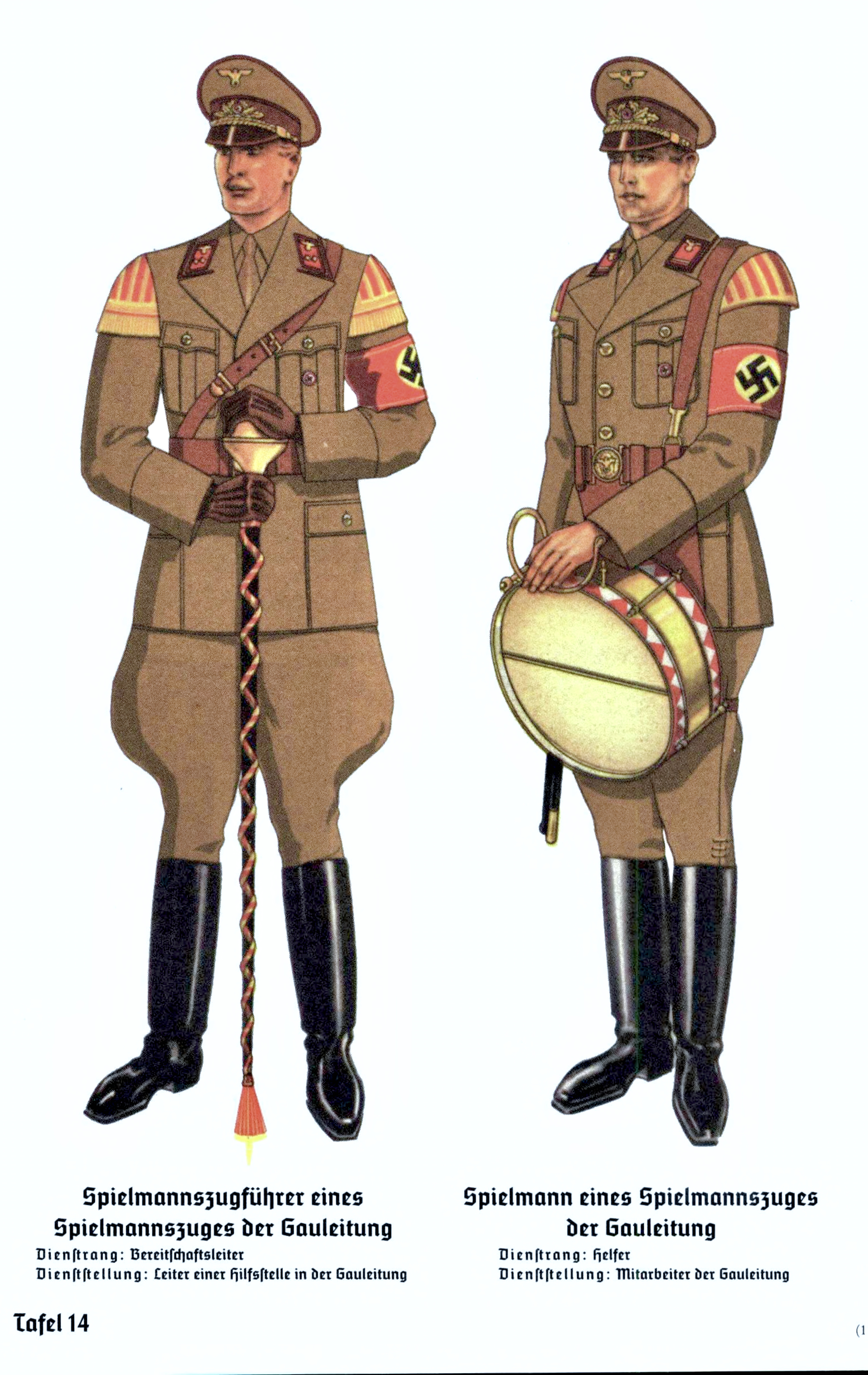
Bereitschaftsleiter in marching band uniform with baton (left), 1940

Bereitschaftsleiter (Readiness Leader) was a Nazi Party political rank which existed between 1939 and 1945. There were three levels of the rank, known as Bereitschaftsleiter, Oberbereitschaftsleiter, and Hauptbereitschaftsleiter.

The rank was created to replace the older rank of Stellenleiter, itself a replacement of the even old rank of Zellenwart. Those holding the rank of Bereitschaftsleiter were most often assigned to the position of Zellenleiter on the local level of the Nazi Party. In the higher Party levels (County, Region, and National), the rank of Bereitschaftsleiter was used as a low level staff or clerical position.

== Insignia ==
Gorget patch for Bereitschaftsleiter
Wehrmacht equivalent: Feldwebel (OR-6)
Party position: Cell Operations Foreman, Block Leader

Gorget patch for Ober-
Bereitschaftsleiter
Wehrmacht equivalent: Oberfeldwebel (OR-7)
Party position: Cell Operations Foreman, Block Leader

Gorget patch for Haupt-
Bereitschaftsleiter
Wehrmacht equivalent: Stabsfeldwebel (OR-8)
Party position: Cell Operations Foreman, Block Leader, Cell Leader

== Literature ==
- Clark, J. (2007). Uniforms of the NSDAP. Atglen, PA: Schiffer Publishing
