= St Swithun's Church, East Grinstead =

Church & Grade II* listed building in East Grinstead, West Sussex, England

Coordinates: 51.1242°N 0.0059°W

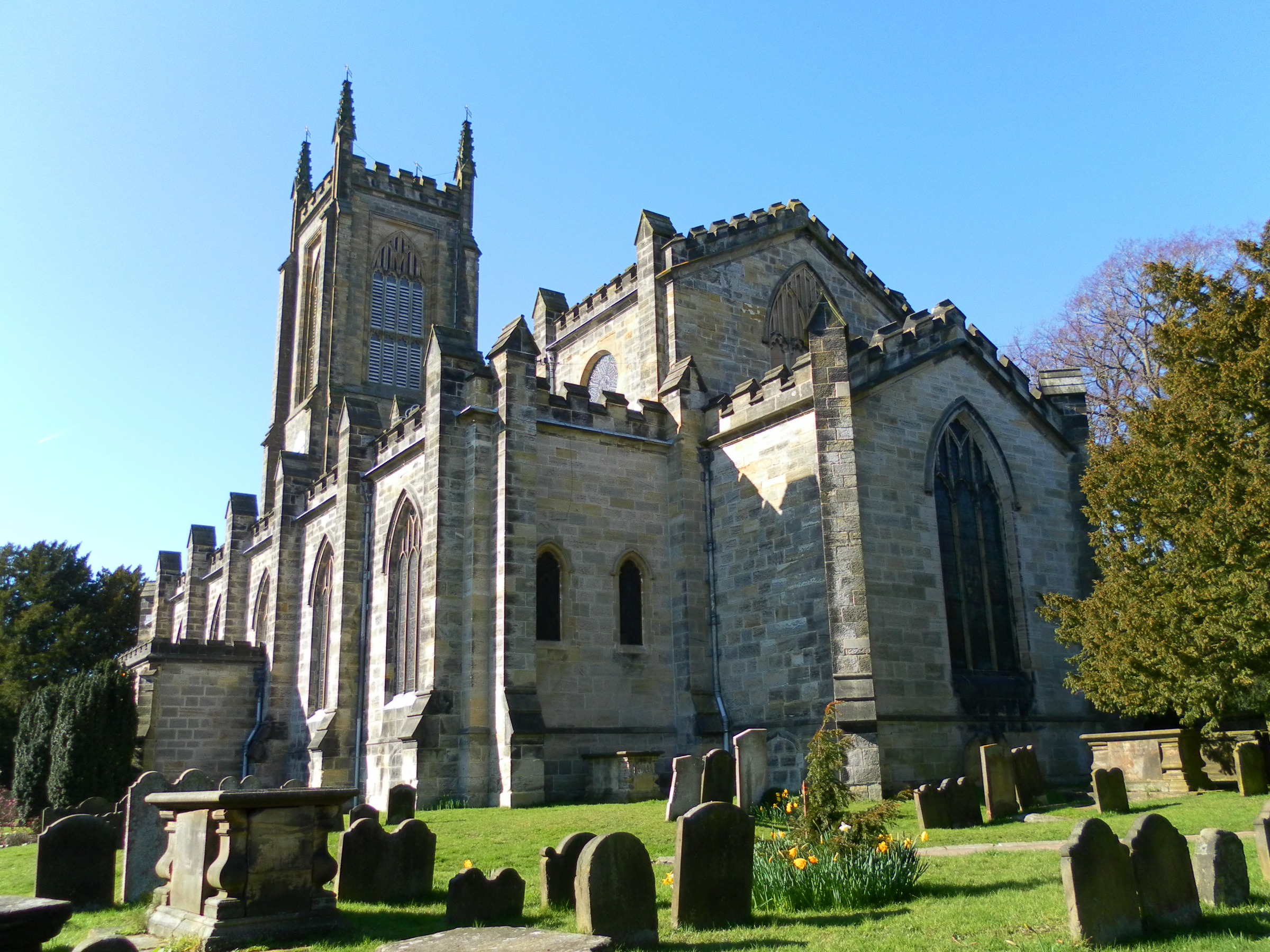
St Swithun's Church

St Swithun's is a Church of England church in East Grinstead, West Sussex, England, which is a Grade II* listed building.

The site had a church since the 11th century. It was struck by lightning in 1772 and after it was rebuilt by James Wyatt it was opened in 1789. It is situated on a hill-top site near entrance to town, where in the past several tracks met. The area began to be settled in the late tenth century: and St Swithun (Bishop of Winchester, 852–862) was the choice for church patron. To this day it remains a visible landmark.

Near the entrance to the church, three stones mark the supposed ashes of Anne Tree, Thomas Dunngate and John Forman who were burned as martyrs on 18 July 1556 because they would not renounce the Protestant faith. Due to the method of execution and the charge of 'heresy', the three were later assumed in local folklore to have been charged with witchcraft and are referred to as 'the witches'.

From 1871 to 1908, the vicar of the church was Douglas Yeoman Blakiston. Prior to being ordained, he had worked as an artist. Two large oil paintings by him remain in the church as do several organ pipes he painted with portraits of parishioners. His son, Herbert Blakiston, went on to become Vice-Chancellor of the University of Oxford.

A national appeal for funds raised £516 in 1788. A programme of restoration in 1874 inaugurated the present appearance. A Trust Fund was set up in 1979 to provide funding for restoration. It is independent of the Parochial Church Council.
