= East Grinstead =

Town in West Sussex, England

Coordinates: 51°07′43″N 0°00′52″W

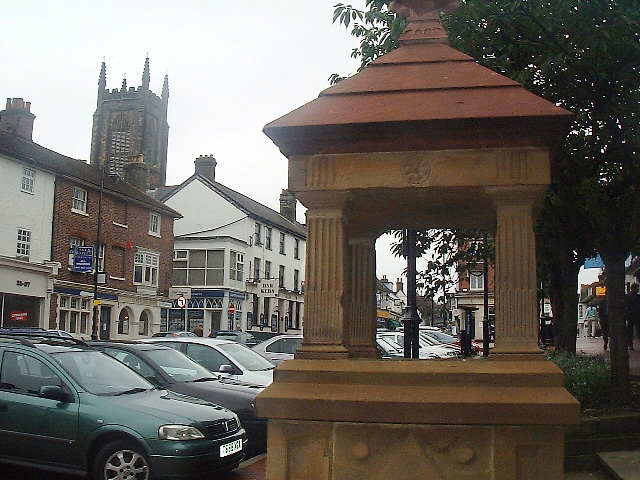
- High Street

- Location within West Sussex
- Area: 24.43 km^{2} (9.43 sq mi)
- Population: 27,413
  - Density: 980/km^{2} (2,500/sq mi)
- OS grid reference: TQ395385
  - London: 26 mi (42 km) N
- Civil parish: East Grinstead
- District: Mid Sussex
- Shire county: West Sussex
- Region: South East
- Country: England
- Sovereign state: United Kingdom
- Post town: EAST GRINSTEAD
- Postcode district: RH19
- Dialling code: 01342
- Police: Sussex
- Fire: West Sussex
- Ambulance: South East Coast
- UK Parliament: East Grinstead and Uckfield
- Website: www.eastgrinstead.gov.uk

East Grinstead (/ˈɡrɪnstɛd, -stɪd/) is a town in West Sussex, England, near the East Sussex, Surrey, and Kent borders, 27 miles (43 km) south of London, 21 miles (34 km) north of Brighton, and 38 miles (61 km) northeast of the county town of Chichester. Situated in the northeast corner of the county, bordering Surrey, the civil parish has an area of 2,443.45 hectares (6,037.9 acres). The population at the 2011 Census was 26,383.

Nearby towns include Crawley and Horley to the west, Tunbridge Wells to the east and Redhill and Reigate to the northwest. The town is contiguous with the village of Felbridge to the northwest. Until 1974 East Grinstead was in East Sussex, before joining with Haywards Heath and Burgess Hill as the Mid-Sussex district of West Sussex.

The town is on the Greenwich Meridian. It has many historic buildings, and the Weald and Ashdown Forest lie to the south-east.

The name Grinstead derives from the Old English grēnestede, meaning 'green place'.

== Places of interest ==
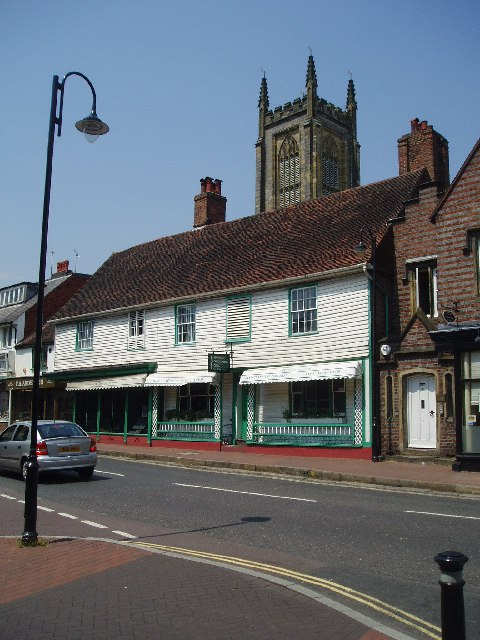
Houses and shops in East Grinstead

The High Street contains one of the longest continuous runs of 14th-century timber-framed buildings in England. Other notable buildings in the town include Sackville College, the sandstone almshouse, built in 1609. In 1853 the warden of Sackville College, John Mason Neale, wrote the Christmas carol "Good King Wenceslas". The college has sweeping views towards Ashdown Forest. The adjacent St Swithun's Church stands on the highest ground in the town and was rebuilt in the eighteenth century (the tower dating from 1789) to a perpendicular design by James Wyatt. The imposing structure dominates the surrounding countryside for many miles around. In the churchyard are commemorated the East Grinstead Martyrs, and in the south-east corner is the grave of John Mason Neale.

The Greenwich Meridian runs through the grounds of the historic 1769 East Court mansion, home of the Town Council, giving the visitor an opportunity to stand with a foot in both the east and west. The mansion stands in a parkland setting. In 1968, the East Grinstead Society was founded as an independent body, both to protect the historically important buildings of East Grinstead (and its environs) and to improve the amenities for future generations.

Three miles (5 km) east of the town, in Hammerwood, is Hammerwood Park, a country house built by Benjamin Henry Latrobe in 1792, and once owned by the rock band Led Zeppelin. On the outskirts of the town is Standen, a country house belonging to the National Trust, containing one of the best collections of Arts and Crafts movement furnishings and fabrics. Kidbrooke Park (today Michael Hall School), a home of the Hambro family, was restored by the noted Sussex architect and antiquarian, Walter Godfrey, as was Plawhatch Hall. East Grinstead House is the headquarters of the (UK and Ireland) Caravan Club.

During the Second World War, the Queen Victoria Hospital developed a specialist burns unit led by Sir Archibald McIndoe. It became world-famous for pioneering treatment of RAF and allied aircrew who were badly burned or crushed, and required reconstructive plastic surgery. In 1941 patients of McIndoe who had undergone experimental reconstructive plastic surgery formed the Guinea Pig Club, which then became a support network for the aircrew and their family members. The club remained active after the end of the war, and its annual reunion meetings at East Grinstead continued until 2007, when the club was wound down in view of the increasing frailty of its surviving members. As such, the townspeople became very supportive of the patients at the Queen Victoria Hospital. Even though many of the victims were horribly disfigured (often missing limbs, and in the worst cases faces, their faces made up of burn tissue), the townspeople would go out of their way to make the men feel normal. Families invited the men to dinner, and girls asked them to go on dates. Patients of the burn units remember, and cherish, the charity received from the townspeople of East Grinstead.

During the same War, the town became a secondary target for German bombers which failed to make their primary target elsewhere. On the afternoon of Friday 9 July 1943, a Luftwaffe bomber became separated from its squadron, followed the main railway line and circled the town twice, then dropped eight bombs. Two bombs, one with a delayed-action fuse, fell on the Whitehall Theatre, a cinema on the London Road, where 184 people at the matinée show were watching a Hopalong Cassidy film before the main feature. A total of 108 people were killed in the raid, including children in the cinema, many of whom were evacuees; and some twenty Canadian servicemen stationed locally, who were either in the cinema when it was hit, or arrived minutes later to help with rescuing survivors. A further 235 were injured. This was the largest loss of life of any single air raid in Sussex.

In the winter of 2010, Claque Theatre produced the East Grinstead Community Play, which focussed on the bombing of the town in 1943, the work of Archibald McIndoe and his team at the hospital, and the Guinea Pig Club and its members. It was performed by local residents. On 9 June 2014 the Princess Royal unveiled a monument to Sir Archibald McIndoe and the Guinea Pigs. It stands in front of Sackville College at the east end of the High Street. It was funded by a public appeal and sculpted by Martin Jennings, whose own father was a Guinea Pig. It depicts a burned airman looking to the sky, with McIndoe placing reassuring hands on his shoulders. The stone ring around the statue is for visitors to sit and reflect and in doing so become part of the story representing "The town that did not stare".

In 2006, the East Grinstead Town Museum was moved to new custom-built premises in the historic centre of the town, and successfully re-opened to the public as the East Grinstead Museum. Chequer Mead Theatre includes a modern 336-seat] purpose-built auditorium, which stages professional and amateur plays/musicals and music (local rock groups to chamber music orchestras), opera, ballet, folk music, tribute bands, film, event cinema and talks. The venue also has a popular spacious cafe with outdoor seating.

In addition to the nearby Ashdown Forest, East Grinstead is served by the Forest Way and Worth Way linear Country Parks which follow the disused railway line from Three Bridges all the way through to Groombridge and which are part of the Sustrans national cycle network.

== Places of worship ==
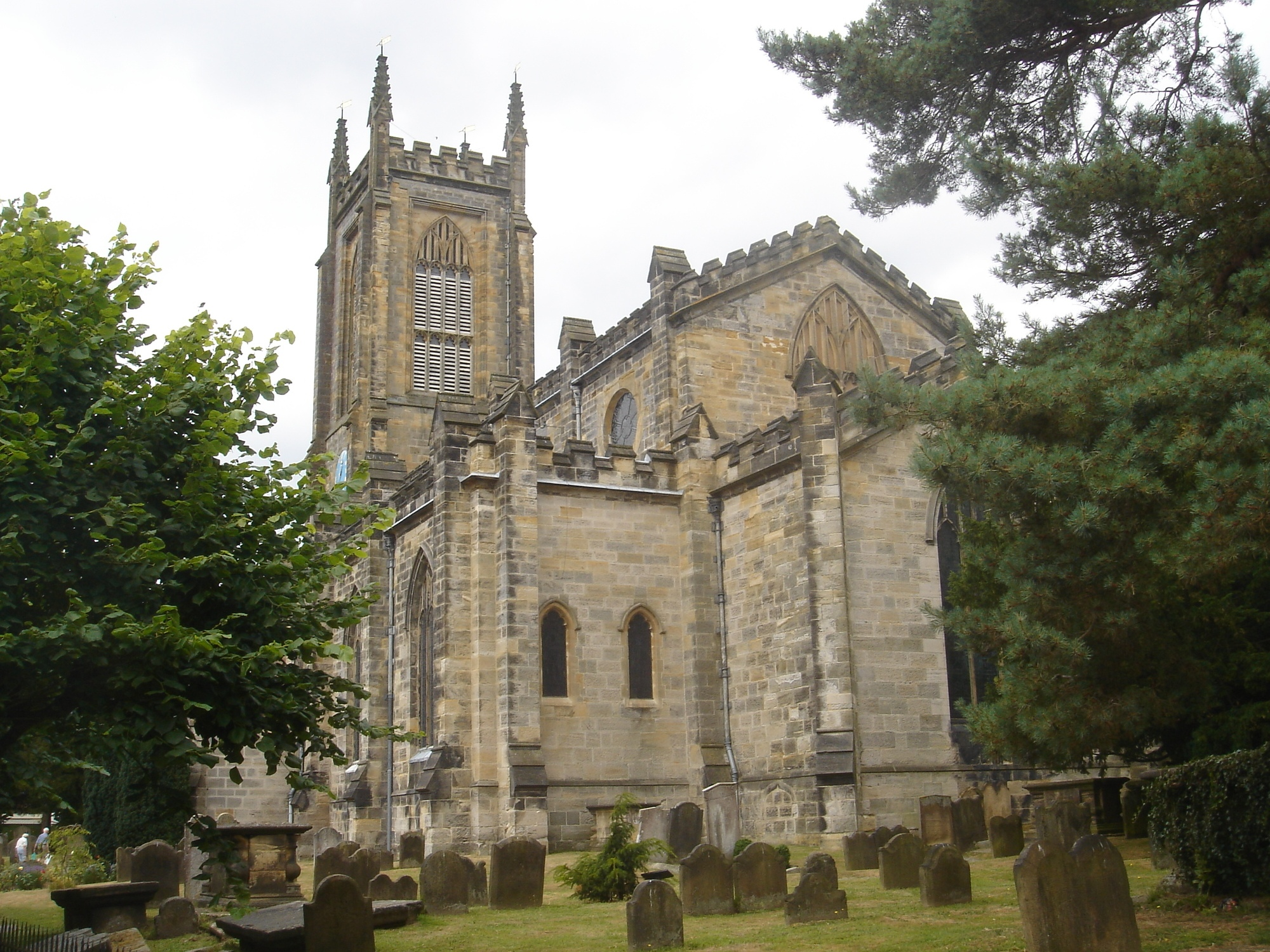
St Swithun's Church

East Grinstead has a diverse range of religious and spiritual organisations for a town of its size.

A broad range of mainstream Christian denominations have places of worship in the town. Protestant Nonconformism has featured especially prominently for the last two centuries, in common with other parts of northern Sussex. Several other religious groups have connections with the town, from merely owning property to having national headquarters there.

=== Church of England ===
The Church of England has four places of worship in the town. St Swithun's Church was founded in the 11th century. Architect James Wyatt rebuilt it in local stone in 1789 after it became derelict and collapsed. Near the entrance to the church, three stones mark the supposed ashes of Anne Tree, Thomas Dunngate and John Forman who were burned as martyrs on 18 July 1556 because they would not renounce the Protestant faith. John Foxe wrote about them in his 1,800-page Foxe's Book of Martyrs. Two other churches are in St Swithun's parish.

St Luke's Church, in Holtye Avenue on the Stone Quarry estate, was built in 1954 to serve the northeast of the town. The church was demolished around 2014 and flats have been built at the location. St Barnabas' Church in Dunnings Road serves the south of the town. The present wooden structure of 1975 replaced an older church built in 1912. The fourth church, in the northwest of the town, is dedicated to St Mary the Virgin. Built by W.T. Lowdell over a 21-year period beginning in 1891, the Decorated Gothic Revival church was consecrated in 1905 and has its own parish. It was established by adherents of the Oxford Movement, and services still follow a more Anglo-Catholic style than East Grinstead's other Anglican churches.

=== Non-Conformist ===
East Grinstead's first Nonconformist church was the Zion Chapel, built in 1810 for the Countess of Huntingdon's Connexion. The small evangelical Calvinistic group owned the church until 1980; it is now used by Baptists and is called West Street Baptist Church. Trinity Methodist Church is the much-expanded successor to older places of Methodist worship in the town; the community dates back to 1868. The United Reformed Church community meets in the Moat Church, a former Congregational chapel built in the Early English Gothic Revival style in 1870.

A 2007 book also noted the New Life Church—a Newfrontiers evangelical charismatic church—the Kingdom Faith Church, another independent charismatic congregation, and the Full Gospel Church.

=== Other places of worship ===
Roman Catholics worship at the Church of Our Lady and St Peter, founded in 1898 by Edward Blount of the Blount baronetcy, a resident of nearby Worth. Opus Dei has a conference centre at Wickenden Manor near the town, and Rosicrucians also have a presence in nearby Greenwood Gate.

Jehovah's Witnesses worship at a modern Kingdom Hall. The community, established in 1967, previously used a former Salvation Army building.

The meetinghouse of the LDS Church on Ship Street was built in 1985. The London England Temple of the Church of Jesus Christ of Latter-day Saints, is just over the Surrey border at Newchapel.

The United Kingdom (and former world) headquarters of the Church of Scientology is at Saint Hill Manor on the southwestern edge of East Grinstead. Scientology's founder L. Ron Hubbard bought the Georgian mansion and its 24 hectares (59 acres; 0.24 km^{2}) of grounds from the Maharaja of Jaipur in 1959 and lived in the town until 1967.

== Proposed redevelopment ==
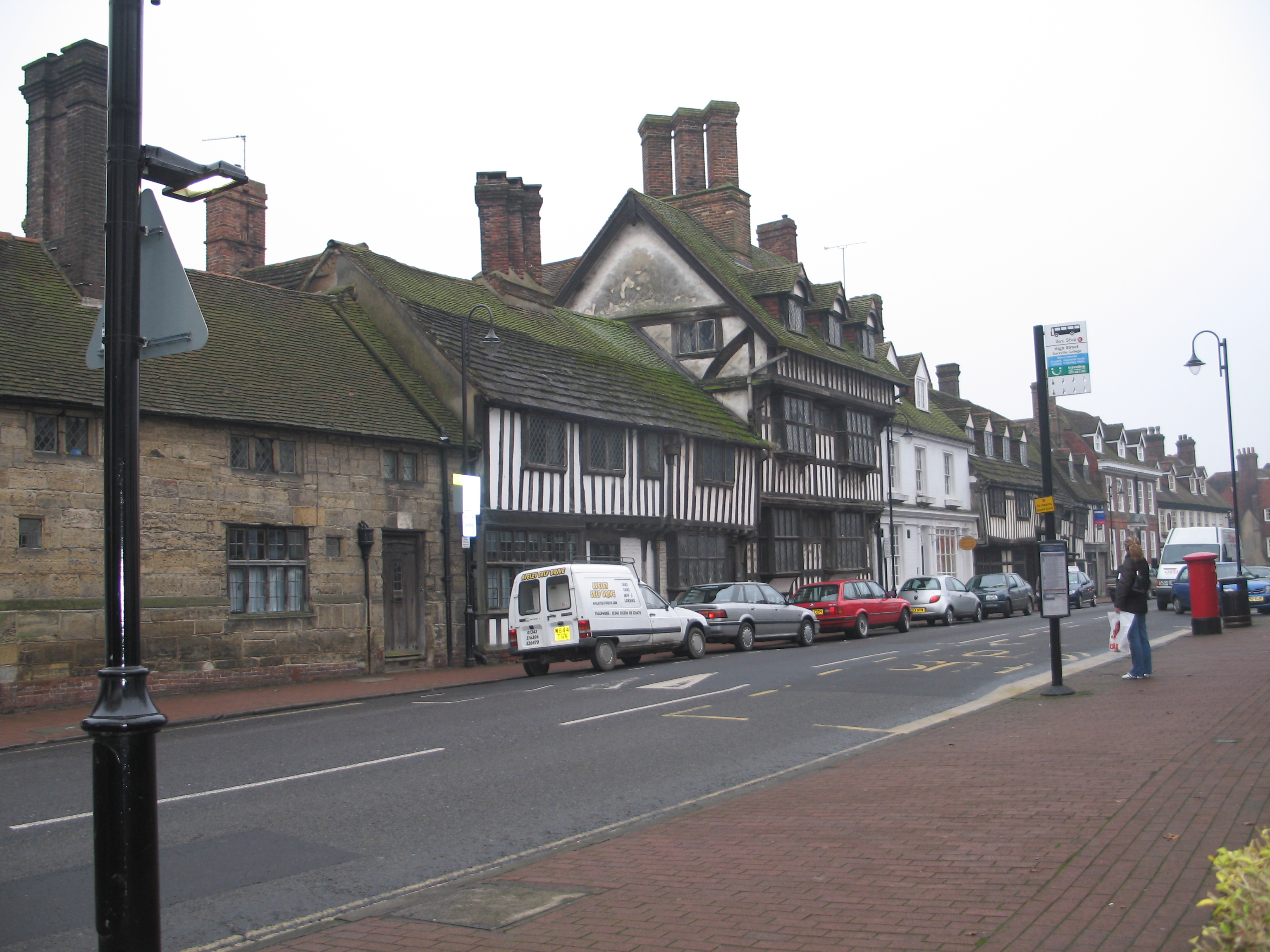
A row of 14th-century timber-framed buildings on East Grinstead High Street

The East Grinstead Town Centre Master Plan was adopted on 10 July 2006 as a Supplementary Planning Document (SPD). The scheme proposed regeneration of the town centre in association with Thornfield Properties PLC. Thornfield Properties had submitted plans to the council for the start of an ambitious development of the Queens Walk and West Street area. It was expected that other redevelopment companies would fulfil targets outlined in the SPD over the next 20 years.

== Transport ==
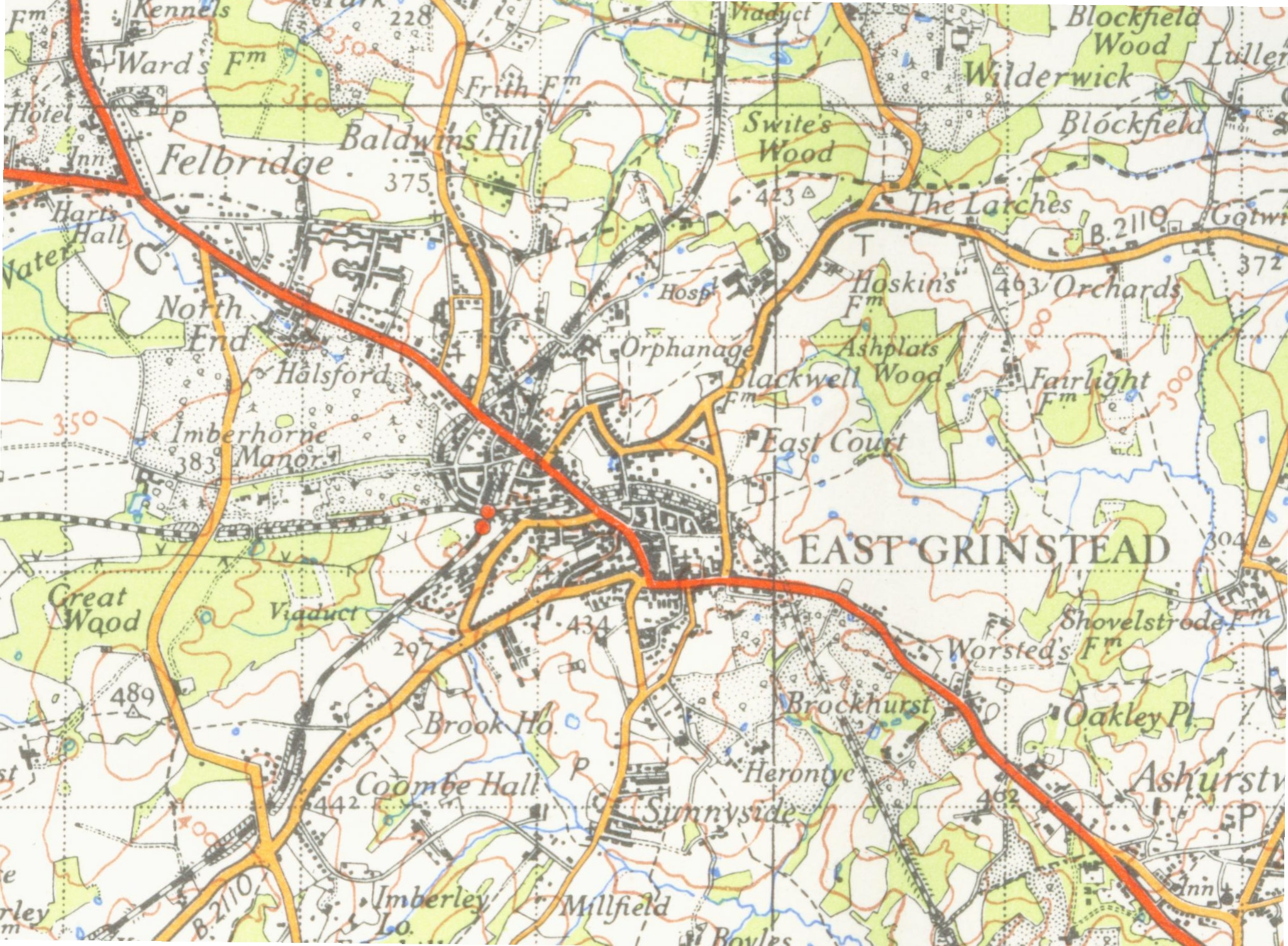
A map of East Grinstead from 1946

=== Air ===
Gatwick Airport is 10 miles (16 km) from the town, whilst Redhill Aerodrome and Biggin Hill Airport are both within half an hour's drive. Hammerwood Park has a helicopter landing site for visiting pilots (3.5 miles (5.6 km) from the town).

=== Rail ===
East Grinstead station became a railway terminus in 1967, after the line from Three Bridges to Royal Tunbridge Wells was closed under the Beeching cuts, a rationalisation of British Railways' branch lines based on a report by Dr Richard Beeching, a resident of the town at that time. The line to Lewes, part of the Bluebell Railway, closed in 1958.

In the late 1970s, the town's inner relief road was built along a section of one of the closed railway lines and is officially named "Beeching Way". It has been nicknamed "Beeching Cut" as it runs through a cutting and was once one of the lines that Beeching cut. Much of rest of the trackbed of the disused Three Bridges to Groombridge line now forms the route of the Worth Way and Forest Way, linear Country Parks allowing access to the Wealden countryside.

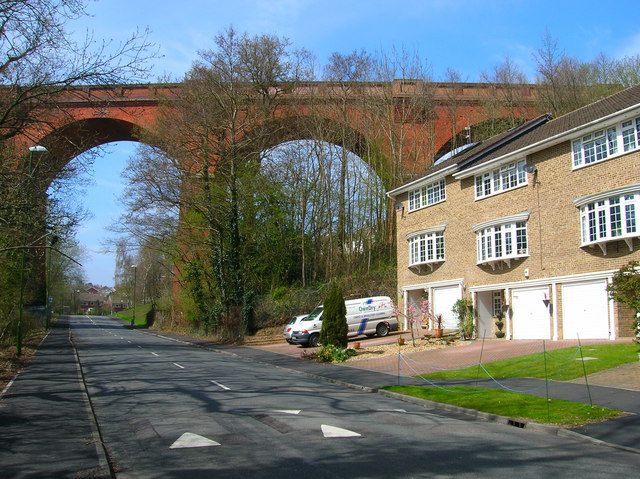
The Imberhorne Viaduct carrying the Bluebell Railway in East Grinstead

A part of the Lewes line was re-constructed by the Bluebell Railway, a nearby preserved standard-gauge railway. The extension work was carried out in stages. The first paid-passenger service departed from East Grinstead station at 9:45 on Saturday 23 March 2013, and the first train left Sheffield Park for East Grinstead at 9:30 a.m. with services running each way every 45 minutes thereafter.

=== Road ===
The town lies on the junction of the A22 and A264 roads. For just over one mile (1.6 km), from just to the north of the Town Centre to Felbridge village in Surrey, the two routes use the same stretch of single carriageway road. This is one of the principal causes of traffic congestion in the town.

The town is within commuting distance of London (about 30 miles (50 km)) and Crawley/Gatwick (about 10 miles (16 km)) by road. According to the 2001 Census, one in eight residents commuted to Crawley and Gatwick Airport for work with over 98% travelling by car.

== Education ==
Education in the town is provided through both state and independent schools. West Sussex County Council provides seven primary schools along with two secondary schools. All these schools are co-educational and comprehensive. Private secondary education is provided by several day and boarding schools in the surrounding areas straddling Kent and Sussex.

=== State secondary schools ===
- Imberhorne School
- Sackville School

=== Preparatory schools ===
- Brambletye School
- Ashdown House

== Health care ==
Queen Victoria Hospital was founded as a cottage hospital in 1863, and was rebuilt on its current site in the 1930s. Queen Victoria Hospital has been known for its burns treatment facilities and expertise. In East Grinstead is located Centre for Sight, a private ophthalmology practice with a clinic and surgical centre founded by Sheraz M. Daya.

There are many facilities for mental healthcare in East Grinstead, including Springvale Community Mental Health Centre, and Charters Court.

== Twin towns ==
East Grinstead is twinned with:

- Bourg-de-Péage, France
- Sant Feliu de Guíxols, Spain
- Mindelheim, Germany
- Schwaz, Austria
- Verbania, Italy

== Sports and social clubs ==
East Grinstead is served by local sports and social clubs. Municipal facilities include the King George's Field, which was left to the town by a local benefactor and was named as a memorial to King George V. The King's Centre leisure centre, currently owned and operated by Mid Sussex District Council is on this land. The centre includes an indoor swimming pool and other facilities such as a gym and a multi-purpose sports hall.

There are floodlit tennis courts and bowling green at Mount Noddy and also tennis courts and a variety of pitches at East Court where Non-League football club East Grinstead Town F.C. play. The athletics club, East Grinstead AC, which was formed in 1978 train at Imberhorne School. The senior team competes in the Southern Athletics League Division 3 and has young athletes teams competing in regional leagues. East Grinstead Rugby Football Club currently play in Harvey's of Sussex 1. EGRFC are supported by a junior section which fields teams from Under 18's down to Under 7's. East Grinstead is also home to East Grinstead Hockey Club and East Grinstead Lacrosse Club established in 2004, with two men's teams and a women's team catering to a variety of skill levels.

East Grinstead Runners meet every Tuesday and Thursday evenings usually at the station top car park for various training runs and every Sunday morning for the Sunday social which is always on the trails around town.

== Culture, music and arts ==
=== Chequer Mead ===
Chequer Mead Theatre (formerly Chequer Mead Community Arts Centre) was built in the 1990s and is a 336-seat theatre. It is home to the East Grinstead Music & Arts Festival, which exists to encourage and promote dancing, singing and speech and drama in Sussex and neighbouring counties. The honorary vice-president of the festival in 2018 was former ballerina Beryl Grey. Local groups include the East Grinstead Choral Society and the East Grinstead Operatic Society.

== Media ==
=== Newspapers ===
There were two weekly newspapers: the East Grinstead Courier, published each Tuesday by Local World Ltd and the East Grinstead Gazette, published each Wednesday by the Johnston Press.

=== Television ===
Local news and television programmes are provided by BBC South East and BBC London on BBC One, and ITV Meridian and ITV London on ITV1. Television signals are received from either the Heathfield and Crystal Palace TV transmitters. However, the local relay transmitter only broadcasts programmes from London.

=== Radio ===
The town is covered by both BBC Radio Surrey on 104.0 FM and BBC Radio Sussex on 104.5 FM. Other radio stations including Heart South on 102.7 FM, Greatest Hits Radio South on 106.6 FM and 107 Meridian FM, a based community station which from the town on 107 FM and also online.

== In popular culture ==
=== Presence of minority religions ===
In 1994, a documentary, Why East Grinstead?, was produced for Channel 4's Witness strand of documentaries. It sought to examine and explain the convergence of such a wide variety of religious organisations in the East Grinstead area. The documentary, produced by Zed Productions and directed by Ian Sellar, reached no definite conclusion: explanations ranged from the local presence of ley lines to the more prosaic idea that religious leaders had settled there because they liked the views.

In 2016 The Guardian called East Grinstead "Britain's strangest town", citing the presence of The Church of Scientology, the Ancient and Mystical Order Rosæ Crucis, the ultra-Catholic order of Opus Dei, Christian Scientists, Ashworth Dowsers and the Pagan Federation.

In 2017, The Economist published an article titled "The Joy of Sects" asking why Scientologists, Mormons, Opus Dei and others have settled around East Grinstead. It reported views that included ley lines, proximity to London, and to the experience of the Second World War when "Archibald McIndoe, a plastic surgeon, treated desperately disfigured servicemen at the local Queen Victoria Hospital. East Grinstead was dubbed 'the town that did not stare', for its warmth and openness towards the outsiders."

=== In literature ===
East Grinstead is the destination of the adulterous lovers Norman and Annie in Alan Ayckbourn's trilogy of plays entitled The Norman Conquests. It was chosen because Norman, after some effort, could not get in at Hastings. In the 1977 Thames Television version of the trilogy, Norman and Annie were portrayed by Tom Conti and Penelope Wilton.

East Grinstead also features in Christopher Fowler's novel, Psychoville (1995), in which the town features as harbouring the fictional Invicta Cross, as well as the eventual New Invicta. The town of New Invicta was later used by Jo Amey in Heist as a safehouse.

=== In music ===
East Grinstead is the home of Harry Witherspoon, one of the lead characters in a musical comedy by Stephen Flaherty and Lynn Ahrens called Lucky Stiff.

East Grinstead is the home town of the pop band Right Said Fred.

== Freedom of the Parish ==
The following people and military units have received the Freedom of the Parish of East Grinstead.

=== Individuals ===
- Reverend Canon Clive Everett-Allen: 7 April 2015.
- James Cooper: 25 March 2025

== Bibliography ==
- Bridgewater, Peter (2007), An Eccentric Tour of Sussex, Alfriston: Snake River Press, ISBN 978-1-906022-03-7
- Collins, Sophie (2007), A Sussex Miscellany, Alfriston: Snake River Press, ISBN 978-1-906022-08-2
- Elleray, D. Robert (2004), Sussex Places of Worship, Worthing: Optimus Books, ISBN 0-9533132-7-1
- Harris, Roland B. (September 2005). East Grinstead Historic Character Assessment Report (PDF). Sussex Extensive Urban Survey (EUS) (Report). East Sussex County Council, West Sussex County Council, and Brighton and Hove City Council. Archived from the original (PDF) on 27 May 2011.
- Leppard, M.J. (2001), A History of East Grinstead, Chichester: Phillimore & Co. Ltd, ISBN 1-86077-164-5
- Neillands, Robin (2004), "Towards a Combined Offensive, August 1942–January 1943", The Bomber War: Arthur Harris and the Allied Bomber Offensive, 1939-1945 (2004 ed.), John Murray, ISBN 978-0-7195-6241-9 - Total pages: 480
