= Vormann =

Voormann, Voorman, Voormans, or Vormann are Dutch occupational surnames. Notable people with the surname include:

- Jan Vormann (born 1983), Franco-German urban artist and sculptor
- Klaus Voormann (born 1938), German musician and artist
- Nikolaus von Vormann (1895–1959), German General

== See also ==
- Vroman
