= André Fuhrmann =

German professor and writer

André Fuhrmann (born 30 April 1958 in Essen, Germany) is a Professor of Philosophy and Logic at the Goethe University Frankfurt.

== Early life and education ==
Fuhrmann studied at the University of Marburg and at the University of St Andrews, where in 1984, he earned his Master of Philosophy (MPhil). He went to the Institute of Advanced Studies at the Australian National University and got his Ph.D. in 1988. Fuhrmanns Ph.D. thesis was on Relevance logic and Modal logic. From 1989 to 2002 Fuhrmann worked at the University of Konstanz as a post-doc and research fellow (Heisenberg-Fellow). During that time he had several visiting positions at Indiana University Bloomington, Columbia University, and at the Federal University of Rio de Janeiro. Fuhrmann had the position of a full professor of philosophy (titular) at the São Judas Tadeu University in São Paulo, Brazil from 2002 to 2006. He is a corresponding member of the Academia Brasileira de Filosofia. In 2006 he was appointed to the Chair of Theoretical Philosophy (main area: logic) at the Goethe-University Frankfurt am Main. He was additionally appointed Professor of Linguistics in 2009.

== Research areas ==
André Fuhrmann has made contributions in analytic philosophy, relevance logic and modal logic. Fuhrmann is best known for his research on "belief revision" or "theory change", a field of formal epistemology with applications for artificial intelligence and cognitive science. Fuhrmann also takes an interest in freshwater diatoms. Together with H. Lange-Bertalot he discovered and described new species, particularly in the genus Diploneis.

== Awards and recognition ==
- Heinz-Meier-Leibnitz Prize for work in Cognitive Science (1993)

== Selected works ==
- 1989: Reflective modalities and theory change. Synthese 81.
- 1991: Tropes and laws. Philosophical Studies 63.
- 1991: Theory contraction through base contraction. Journal of Philosophical Logic 20.
- 1991: Models for relevant modal logics. Studia Logica 49.
- 1994: On S. Studia Logica 53; with E. D. Mares.
- 1994: Undercutting and the Ramsey test for conditionals. Synthese 101; with I. Levi.
- 1994: A survey of multiple contractions. Journal of Logic, Language and Information 3; with S. O. Hansson.
- 1995: A relevant theory of conditionals. Journal of Philosophical Logic 24; with E. D. Mares.
- 1997: Solid belief. Theoria 63.
- 1997: An Essay on Contraction. Studies in Logic, Language and Information.
- 1999: When hyperpropositions meet ... Journal of Philosophical Logic 28.
- 2002: Explanatory exclusion and causal relevance. Facta Philosophica 4; with W.P. Mendonça.
- 2002: Russell’s way out of the paradox of propositions. History and Philosophy of Logic 23.
- 2005: Existenz und Notwendigkeit – Kurt Gödels axiomatische Theologie. In: W. Spohn (ed.), Logik in der Philosophie.
- 2006: Is pragmatist truth irrelevant to inquiry? In: E. Olsson (ed.), Knowledge and Inquiry.
- 2013: Knowability as potential knowledge. Synthese 191.
- 2015: Blogging Gödel: His Ontological Argument In The Public Eye. In: K. Swietorzecka (ed.), Gödel’s Ontological Argument. History, Modifications, and Controversies.
- 2017: Deontic Modals: Why Abandon The Default Approach. Erkenntnis 83.
- 2020: Freshwater Diploneis. Diatoms of Europe, vol. 9; with H. Lange-Bertalot and M. Werum.
- 2023: Vorlesungen über Philosophische Logik.
