= Fuhrmann circle =

Circle derived from a triangle

Fuhrmann circle

Fuhrmann circle with Fuhrmann triangle (red), Nagel point $N$ and orthocenter $H$ $|AP_a|=BP_b|=|CP_c|=2r$

In geometry, the Fuhrmann circle of a triangle, named after the German Wilhelm Fuhrmann (1833–1904), is the circle that has as a diameter the line segment between the orthocenter $H$ and the Nagel point $N$. This circle is identical with the circumcircle of the Fuhrmann triangle.

The radius of the Fuhrmann circle of a triangle with sides a, b, and c and circumradius R is

$$R\sqrt{\frac{a^3-a^2b-ab^2+b^3-a^2c+3abc-b^2c-ac^2+c^3}{abc}},$$

which is also the distance between the circumcenter and incenter.

Aside from the orthocenter the Fuhrmann circle intersects each altitude of the triangle in one additional point. Those points all have the distance $2r$ from their associated vertices of the triangle. Here $r$ denotes the radius of the triangles incircle.
