= Einsatzleiter =

Political rank in the Nazi Party

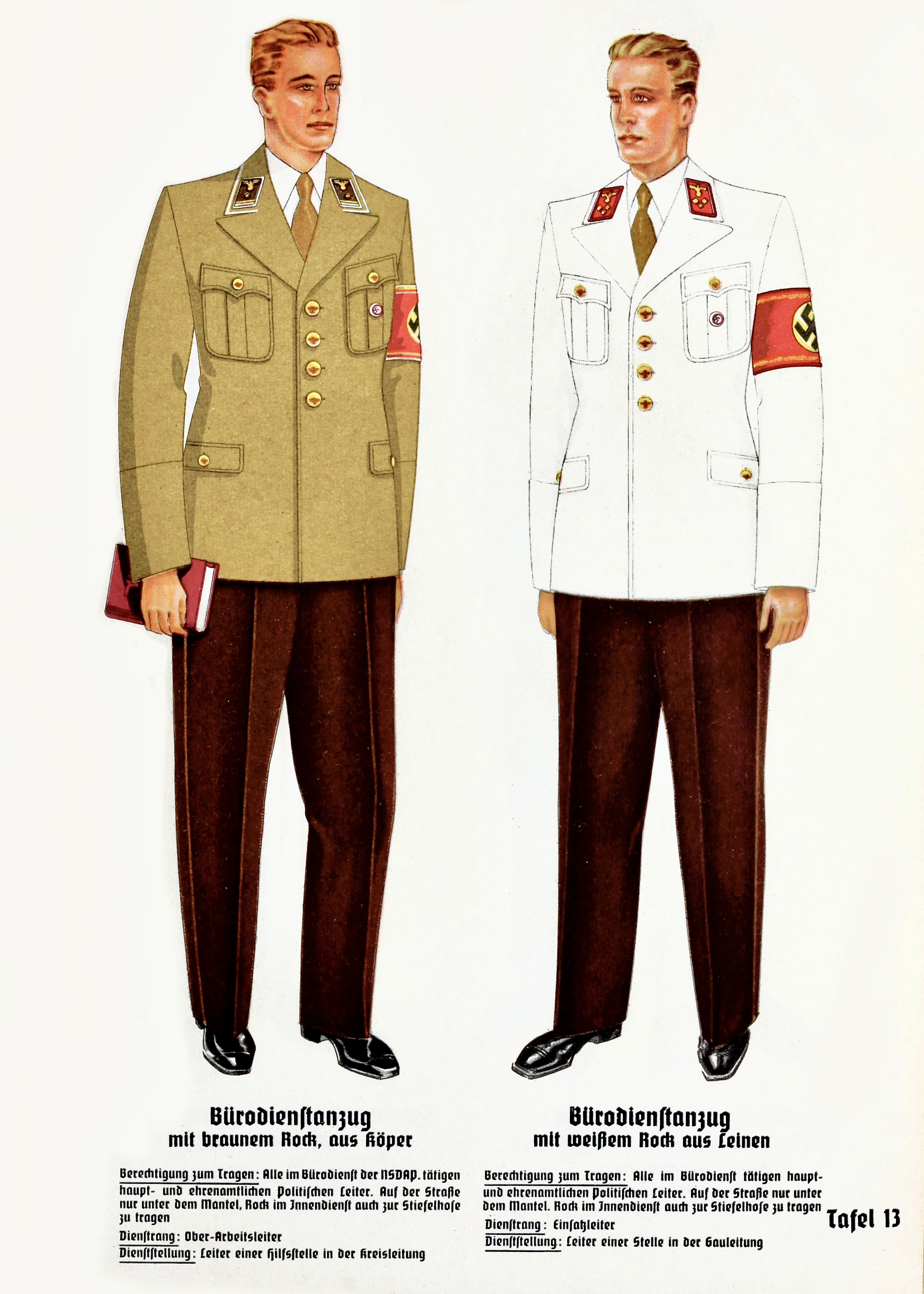
Einsatzleiter uniform, 1940 (right)

Einsatzleiter (Action Leader) was a mid-level Nazi Party political rank created in 1939 as a replacement for the older rank of Amtsleiter. Like its predecessor, the rank of Einsatzleiter was a generic staff position common across all levels of the Party, typically assigned to administrative or clerical duties.

== Insignia ==
Gorget patch for Einsatzleiter

Gorget patch for Obereinsatzleiter

Gorget patch for Haupteinsatzleiter
