= Furmanov =

Furmanov, feminine: Furmanova is a Russian surname. Notable people with the surname include:

- Boris Furmanov (1926–2022), Russian politician
- Dmitry Furmanov (1891–1926), Russian/Soviet writer
- Rudolf Furmanov (1938–2021), Russian actor and stage director

== See also ==
- Furmanová
- Furmanov (inhabited locality), name of several inhabited localities in Russia
- Asteroid 6511 Furmanov, named after Rudolf Furmanov
