= Michael Foreman =

Michael Foreman may refer to:

- Michael Foreman (astronaut) (born 1957), American astronaut
- Michael Foreman (illustrator) (born 1938), British author and illustrator
