= Alexander Aberdeen Forman =

US medal of Honor recipient (1843–1922)

- Born: January 14, 1843; Scipio Township, Michigan, US
- Died: March 3, 1922 (aged 79); Brooklyn, New York, US
- Burial place: Cypress Hills Cemetery
- Military career
- Allegiance: United States; Union
- Branch: United States Army; Union Army
- Rank: Corporal
- Units: Company E, 7th Michigan Volunteer Infantry Regiment
- Conflicts: Battle of Seven Pines
- Awards: Medal of Honor

Alexander Aberdeen Forman (January 14, 1843 – March 3, 1922) was an American soldier who fought in the American Civil War. Forman received the United States' highest award for bravery during combat, the Medal of Honor, for his action during the Battle of Seven Pines in Virginia on May 31, 1862. He was honored with the award on August 17, 1895.

== Biography ==
Forman was born in Scipio Township, Michigan, on January 14, 1843. He enlisted into the 7th Michigan Infantry. He died on March 3, 1922, and his remains are interred at Cypress Hills Cemetery in Brooklyn, New York.

== Medal of Honor citation ==
The President of the United States of America, in the name of Congress, takes pleasure in presenting the Medal of Honor to Corporal Alexander A. Forman, United States Army, for extraordinary heroism on 31 May 1862, while serving with Company C, 7th Michigan Infantry, in action at Fair Oaks, Virginia. Although wounded, Corporal Forman continued fighting until, fainting from loss of blood, he was carried off the field.

== See also ==
- List of American Civil War Medal of Honor recipients: A–F
