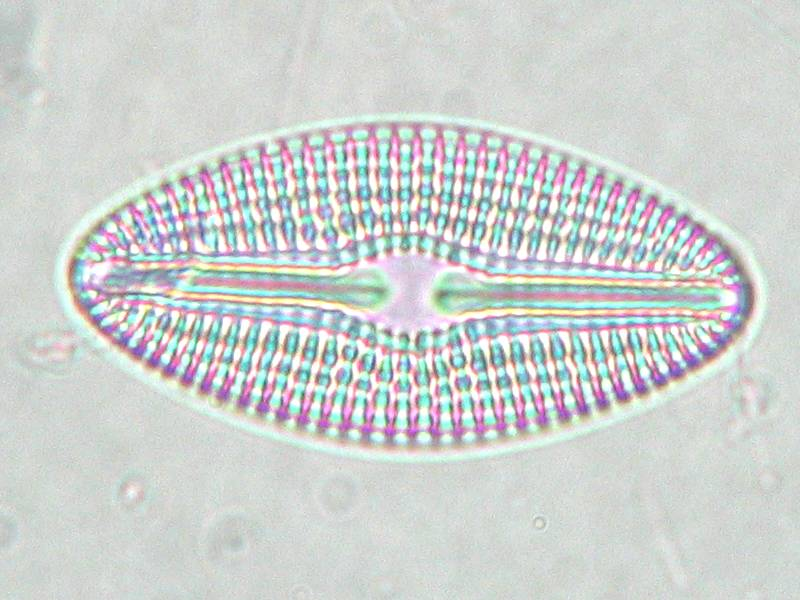
- Diploneis ovalis

Scientific classification
- Domain: Eukaryota
- Clade: Diaphoretickes
- Clade: SAR
- Clade: Stramenopiles
- Phylum: Gyrista
- Subphylum: Ochrophytina
- Class: Bacillariophyceae
- Order: Naviculales
- Family: Diploneidaceae
- Genus: Diploneis; Ehrenberg ex Cleve, 1894

= Diploneis =

Genus of algae

Diploneis is a genus of diatoms belonging to the family Diploneidaceae.

The genus has cosmopolitan distribution.

== Species ==
According to the GBIF, there are over 400 species.

- Diploneis abscondita Lange
- Diploneis aculeata Anisimova, 1951
- Diploneis adeliae Manguin, 1960
- Diploneis adiaphana Schrader, 1969
- Diploneis advena (A.Schmidt) Cleve, 1894 (4)
- Diploneis aequorea H.Heiden, 1928
- Diploneis aestica
- Diploneis aestiva (Donkin) Cleve, 1894 (5)
- Diploneis aestuari Hustedt, 1939
- Diploneis aethiopum Ehrenberg, 1854
- Diploneis africana H.Heiden, 1928
- Diploneis alpina Meister, 1912 (4)
- Diploneis altana Kulikovskiy & Lange-Bertalot, 2015
- Diploneis amicula Kulikovskiy & Lange-Bertalot, 2015
- Diploneis amphisbaena Manicharova, 1950
- Diploneis andama Kulikovskiy & Lange-Bertalot, 2015
- Diploneis andina Frenguelli, 1942
- Diploneis antiqua Cleve-Euler, 1953
- Diploneis aokiensis M.Idei, 2013
- Diploneis apis (Kützing) F.W.Mills, 1934
- Diploneis arctica Cleve, 1898
- Diploneis areolata Cleve, 1894
- Diploneis baicalensis Skvortzov & Meyer, 1928 (15)
- Diploneis baicaloculata Kulikovskiy & Lange-Bertalot, 2015
- Diploneis baicaloparma Kulikovskiy & Lange-Bertalot, 2015
- Diploneis baicalpetersenii Kulikovskiy & Lange-Bertalot, 2015
- Diploneis balcanica N.G.Ognjanova-Rumenova & K.Buczkó, 2010
- Diploneis barbatula Skvortzov, 2012
- Diploneis biremiformis S.J.M.Droop, 1998
- Diploneis biseriata Cleve, 1894 (4)
- Diploneis boldtiana Cleve, 1891 (7)
- Diploneis bombiformis Cleve, 1894
- Diploneis bombus (Ehrenberg) Ehrenberg, 1853 (8)
- Diploneis borostelekiana Pantocsek, 1908
- Diploneis burgitensis Prudent, 1905 (2)
- Diploneis buriatica Kulikovskiy & Lange-Bertalot, 2015
- Diploneis caffra (Gifen) Witkowski
- Diploneis calcilacustris Lange
- Diploneis californica Stancheva & Manoylov, 2018
- Diploneis cerebrum Pennesi, Caputo & Lobban, 2017
- Diploneis chersonensis (Grunow) Cleve, 1894 (6)
- Diploneis chersonensis Grove
- Diploneis chinensis Cleve, 1894
- Diploneis claustra Lobban & Pennesi, 2017
- Diploneis clepsydra Cleve, 1894
- Diploneis clevei Fontell, 1917
- Diploneis coffaeiformis (Schmidt) Cleve, 1894 (4)
- Diploneis colae S.J.M.Droop, 1998
- Diploneis conopeata Kulikovskiy & Lange-Bertalot, 2015
- Diploneis conops Ehrenberg, 1854
- Diploneis constantinii (Skvortzov) Skabichevskij, 1950
- Diploneis contraversa (Mann) F.W.Mills, 1934
- Diploneis costata Skvortzov, 2012
- Diploneis crassa Missuna, 1914
- Diploneis crassibiseriata Kulikovskiy & Lange-Bertalot, 2015
- Diploneis craticula Pennesi, Caputo & Lobban, 2017
- Diploneis crispa Pennesi, Caputo & Lobban, 2017
- Diploneis curiosa Metzeltin, Lange-Bertalot & Nergui, 2009
- Diploneis czekehazensis (Pantocsek) F.W.Mills, 1934
- Diploneis decipiens A.Cleve, 1915 (5)
- Diploneis densestriata (Schmidt) Boyer, 1927
- Diploneis densistriata (Schmidt) F.W.Mills, 1934
- Diploneis didelta Ehrenberg
- Diploneis didyma (Ehrenb.) Cleve
- Diploneis dilatata (M.Peragallo) Lange
- Diploneis dimorpha Hustedt, 1959
- Diploneis diplosticata (Grunow) Hustedt
- Diploneis dirhombus (Schmidt) F.W.Mills, 1934
- Diploneis disturbata Jurilj, 1957
- Diploneis doczyi (Pantocsek)
- Diploneis dombilitensis (2)
- Diploneis duplopunctata Fontell, 1917
- Diploneis elfvingiana Fontell, 1917 (2)
- Diploneis elliptica (Kützing) Cleve, 1894 (22)
- Diploneis ellipticolinearis Kulikovskiy & Lange-Bertalot, 2015
- Diploneis esthereia Hajós
- Diploneis excentrica Boyer, 1916
- Diploneis eximia Metzeltin, Lange-Bertalot & Nergui, 2009
- Diploneis faba Ehrenberg, 1845
- Diploneis fenestrata J.C.Taylor & B.Karthick, 2014
- Diploneis finica (2)
- Diploneis finnicoburyatica Lange-Bertalot & Kulikovskiy, 2015
- Diploneis fontanella Lange-Bertalot, 2004
- Diploneis fontium Reichardt & Lange-Bertalot, 2004
- Diploneis formica H.Okuno, 1952
- Diploneis ganga Kulikovskiy & Lange-Bertalot, 2015
- Diploneis gemmata Ehrenberg, 1856
- Diploneis glabra Østrup, 1918
- Diploneis goohon Kulikovskiy & Lange-Bertalot, 2015
- Diploneis gorjanovici (4)
- Diploneis gracilis Ehrenberg, 1873
- Diploneis gravelleana Hagelstein, 1939
- Diploneis hannai Frenguelli, 1934
- Diploneis haploa Schrader, 1969
- Diploneis heemskerkiana (Brockmann) S.J.M.Droop, 1996
- Diploneis heisingeriae Jurilj, 1954
- Diploneis heteromorphiforma Metzeltin, Lange-Bertalot & Nergui, 2009
- Diploneis hinziae Lange
- Diploneis hormopunctata Hohn & Hellerman, 1966
- Diploneis hospes A.Schmidt
- Diploneis hustedtii Meister, 1934
- Diploneis hyalina Ehrenberg, 1845 (2)
- Diploneis ideii Kulikovskiy & Lange-Bertalot, 2015
- Diploneis imperalis Ehrenberg, 1845
- Diploneis implicatus Pomazkina, Rodionova & Sherbakova, 2019
- Diploneis inaequalis Østrup, 1918
- Diploneis infernalis Lange-Bertalot & K.Krammer, 2007
- Diploneis inscripta Cleve, 1894 (2)
- Diploneis insolitus Hohn & Hellerman, 1966
- Diploneis jasnitskii Skabichevskii, 1936
- Diploneis kahlii H.Lange-Bertalot & Rumrich, 2000
- Diploneis kawabatae Gerd Moser, 1998
- Diploneis konstantini Skabichevskii, 1952
- Diploneis krammeri Lange-Bertalot & E.Reichardt, 2000
- Diploneis lacuslemanii Brun, 1895 (2)
- Diploneis lacustris Rodionova, Pomazkina & Sherbakova, 2019
- Diploneis ladogensis P.T.Cleve, 1891
- Diploneis lata Skvortzow, 1937 (3)
- Diploneis late-elliptica Skabichevskii, 1936
- Diploneis lenzii Krasske, 1939
- Diploneis lesinensis Cleve, 1894
- Diploneis letourneuri Cleve, 1894
- Diploneis levicostata Jousé, 1934
- Diploneis lianjiangensis Chin & Lin, 1979
- Diploneis lijingensis C.Huang
- Diploneis linearielliptica D.Metzeltin, H.Lange-Bertalot & S.Nergui, 2009
- Diploneis linearifera M.Idei, 2013
- Diploneis linearis Otto Müller, 1909 (2)
- Diploneis littoralis (Donkin) Cleve, 1894 (5)
- Diploneis lulensis Cleve-Euler, 1953
- Diploneis lusatica Lange
- Diploneis maeandra Cleve-Euler, 1922
- Diploneis major Cleve, 1894 (3)
- Diploneis manguinii Fusey, 1948
- Diploneis marginata Schmidt, 1874 (4)
- Diploneis marginestriata Hustedt, 1922 (3)
- Diploneis mawsmaii Bhatt & B.Karthick, 2020
- Diploneis mesolia Ehrenberg, 1872
- Diploneis metzeltinii Kulikovskiy & Lange-Bertalot, 2015
- Diploneis meyeri Skabichevskii, 1936
- Diploneis minima Hustedt, 1956
- Diploneis minuta J.B.Petersen, 1928 (2)
- Diploneis mirabilis König, 1959
- Diploneis modica Hustedt, 1945
- Diploneis modicahassiaca Lange
- Diploneis modicella Cholnoky, 1963
- Diploneis mongolica Metzeltin, Lange-Bertalot & Nergui, 2009
- Diploneis monodi Guermeur, 1954
- Diploneis munge Kulikovskiy & Lange-Bertalot, 2015
- Diploneis musciformis Meyer, 1938
- Diploneis nanofontanella Lange
- Diploneis nanometzeltinii Kulikovskiy & Lange-Bertalot, 2015
- Diploneis natalensis Cholnoky, 1956
- Diploneis navicans (Brun) F.W.Mills, 1934
- Diploneis nitescenes Gregory
- Diploneis nitidula Brun, 1901
- Diploneis nonelliptica Kulikovskiy & Lange-Bertalot, 2015
- Diploneis notata Østrup, 1918
- Diploneis oamaruensis (Cleve) Mills, 1934
- Diploneis oblongella (Nägeli) R.Ross
- Diploneis oblongellopsis Lange
- Diploneis obtusa Kulikovskiy & Lange-Bertalot, 2015
- Diploneis ocellata Cleve, 1892
- Diploneis ocellata Østrup, 1904
- Diploneis oestrupii Hustedt, 1937
- Diploneis okhapkinii Kulikovskiy & Lange-Bertalot, 2015
- Diploneis olandica A.Cleve, 1953
- Diploneis ordines Kulikovskiy & Lange-Bertalot, 2015
- Diploneis ornamentalis Salah, 1967
- Diploneis ornata Hajós, 1971
- Diploneis ostrobottnica Cleve-Euler, 1939 (3)
- Diploneis ovalis H.Lange-Bertalot
- Diploneis pantocsekii Cleve-Euler, 1953
- Diploneis papula (A.W.F.Schmidt) Cleve, 1894 (1)
- Diploneis parabudayana E.Jovanovska, T.Nakov & Z.Levkov, 2013
- Diploneis parahinziae Lange
- Diploneis parallelus Loseva, 1982
- Diploneis paramarginestriata Kulikovskiy & Lange-Bertalot, 2015
- Diploneis parauschkaniensis Kulikovskiy & Lange-Bertalot, 2015
- Diploneis parma Cleve, 1891 (4)
- Diploneis patagonica Otto Müller, 1909
- Diploneis pearsalli Salah, 1955
- Diploneis perforata Jurilj, 1957
- Diploneis peterseni Hustedt, 1937
- Diploneis pinquis F.W.Mills, 1934
- Diploneis platessa Cleve & Grove, 1894
- Diploneis pneumatica S.J.M.Droop, 1998
- Diploneis poretzkyi Tscheremissinova, 1956
- Diploneis poroidea Jurilj, 1957
- Diploneis praerupta Goretskii, 1949
- Diploneis praesejuncta S.J.M.Droop, 1998
- Diploneis praetermissa Lange
- Diploneis prisca Jurilj, 1957 (2)
- Diploneis proserpinae Ehrenberg, 1858
- Diploneis pseudaokiensis Kulikovskiy & Lange-Bertalot, 2015
- Diploneis pseudobombiformis Hustedt, 1937
- Diploneis pseudomeyeri Kulikovskiy & Lange-Bertalot, 2015
- Diploneis pseudopetersenii Cholnoky, 1963
- Diploneis pseudovalis Hustedt, 1930 (2)
- Diploneis puellafallax Lange
- Diploneis puelloides Fusey, 1950
- Diploneis pulchella Kisselev, 1931
- Diploneis pulcherrima Hustedt, 1938
- Diploneis pulchra E.Jovanovska, T.Nakov & Z.Levkov, 2013
- Diploneis pullus Ehrenberg, 1872
- Diploneis pumicosus Sherbakova, Pomazkina & Rodionova, 2019
- Diploneis pupula Mereschkowsky, 1903
- Diploneis pygmaea Mayer, 1913
- Diploneis quasispinulosa Kulikovskiy & Lange-Bertalot, 2015
- Diploneis rauhialensis Sheshukova-Poretskaya, 1955
- Diploneis reticulata Jurilj, 1957
- Diploneis rex S.J.M.Droop, 1996
- Diploneis rhombica Skabichevskii, 1936
- Diploneis rhombus Ehrenberg, 1856
- Diploneis rimosa Pennesi & Caputo, 2017
- Diploneis robustus Subrahmanyan, 1946
- Diploneis rostrata Wood, 1961
- Diploneis rotunda E.Jovanovska, T.Nakov & Z.Levkov, 2013
- Diploneis rouhialensis Brander, 1943
- Diploneis rouxioides Schrader, 1969
- Diploneis rupestris Skvortzow, 1938 (2)
- Diploneis schmidtii Cleve, 1894
- Diploneis seperanda Lange-Bertalot, 2004
- Diploneis sharbin Kulikovskiy & Lange-Bertalot, 2015
- Diploneis skvortzovii Skabichevskii, 1936
- Diploneis smithi (5)
- Diploneis solea S.J.M.Droop, 1998
- Diploneis sooi Hajós, 1973
- Diploneis spectabilis D.Metzeltin, H.Lange-Bertalot & S.Nergui, 2009
- Diploneis stagnarum Prudent, 1906
- Diploneis stauroneiformis Hendey, 1971
- Diploneis stephen-droopii Kulikovskiy & Lange-Bertalot, 2015
- Diploneis stigmosa Heiden & Kolbe, 1928
- Diploneis stroemi Hustedt, 1937
- Diploneis subadvena Hustedt, 1937
- Diploneis subbaicalensis Kulikovskiy & Lange-Bertalot, 2015
- Diploneis submeyeri Kulikovskiy & Lange-Bertalot, 2015
- Diploneis suborbicularis (W.Gregory) Cleve, 1894 (10)
- Diploneis suboricularis (Gregory) Cleve
- Diploneis subovalis Cleve, 1894 (13)
- Diploneis subrhombica Cleve-Euler, 1922
- Diploneis subsmithii Gandhi, 1966
- Diploneis sudamericana Vouilloud & Sala, 2018
- Diploneis suezii Salah & Tamas, 1968
- Diploneis taiga Kulikovskiy & Lange-Bertalot, 2015
- Diploneis taschenbergeri (Schmidt) Hustedt, 1937
- Diploneis tavcarii Jurilj, 1954
- Diploneis tenuibipunctata Kulikovskiy & Lange-Bertalot, 2015
- Diploneis tirolensis Lange
- Diploneis toli Kulikovskiy & Lange-Bertalot, 2015
- Diploneis totarae Schrader, 1969
- Diploneis transylvanica E.Jovanovska et al., 2014
- Diploneis tugelae Cholnoky, 1957
- Diploneis tundra Lange
- Diploneis turgida Skvortzow, 1937 (2)
- Diploneis uschkaniensis Kulikovskiy & Lange-Bertalot, 2015
- Diploneis vandermerwei B.J.Cholnoky, 1955
- Diploneis vespa Cleve, 1894
- Diploneis vetusa Jovanovska, Nakov & Levkov, 2013
- Diploneis vetusta E.Jovanovska, T.Nakov & Z.Levkov, 2013
- Diploneis voigtii Manguin ex Kociolek & Reviers, 1996
- Diploneis volsella Carter & Denny, 1987
- Diploneis weissflogiopsis Lobban & Pennesi, 2017
- Diploneis weretschaginii Kulikovskiy & Lange-Bertalot, 2015
- Diploneis wolffii Foged, 1957
- Diploneis yamanakaensis M.Idei, 2013
- Diploneis yatukaensis Horikawa & Okuno, 1944
- Diploneis zannii Frenguelli, 1933
- Diploneis zehenterii Hajós, 1977

Figures in brackets are approx. how many varieties per species.
