= Furmanov (inhabited locality) =

Furmanov (Russian: Фурманов) is the name of several inhabited localities in Russia.

Urban localities

- Furmanov, Ivanovo Oblast, a town in Ivanovo Oblast

Rural localities

- Furmanov, Orenburg Oblast, a settlement in Furmanovsky Selsoviet of Pervomaysky District of Orenburg Oblast
