= Darren Foreman =

Darren Foreman may refer to:

- Beardyman (born 1982), beatboxer, real name Darren Foreman
- Darren Foreman (footballer) (born 1968), English former footballer
