= Jan Vormann =

Franco-German urban artist and sculptor

- Born: 1983 (age 42–43); Bamberg, Germany
- Education: Kunsthochschule Berlin-Weißensee, Stieglitz Academy of Art and Design

Jan Vormann (born 1983 in Bamberg, Germany) is a Franco-German sculptor and urban artist, best known for his public art installation project Dispatchwork, which involves repairing urban walls using Lego bricks.

== Biography ==
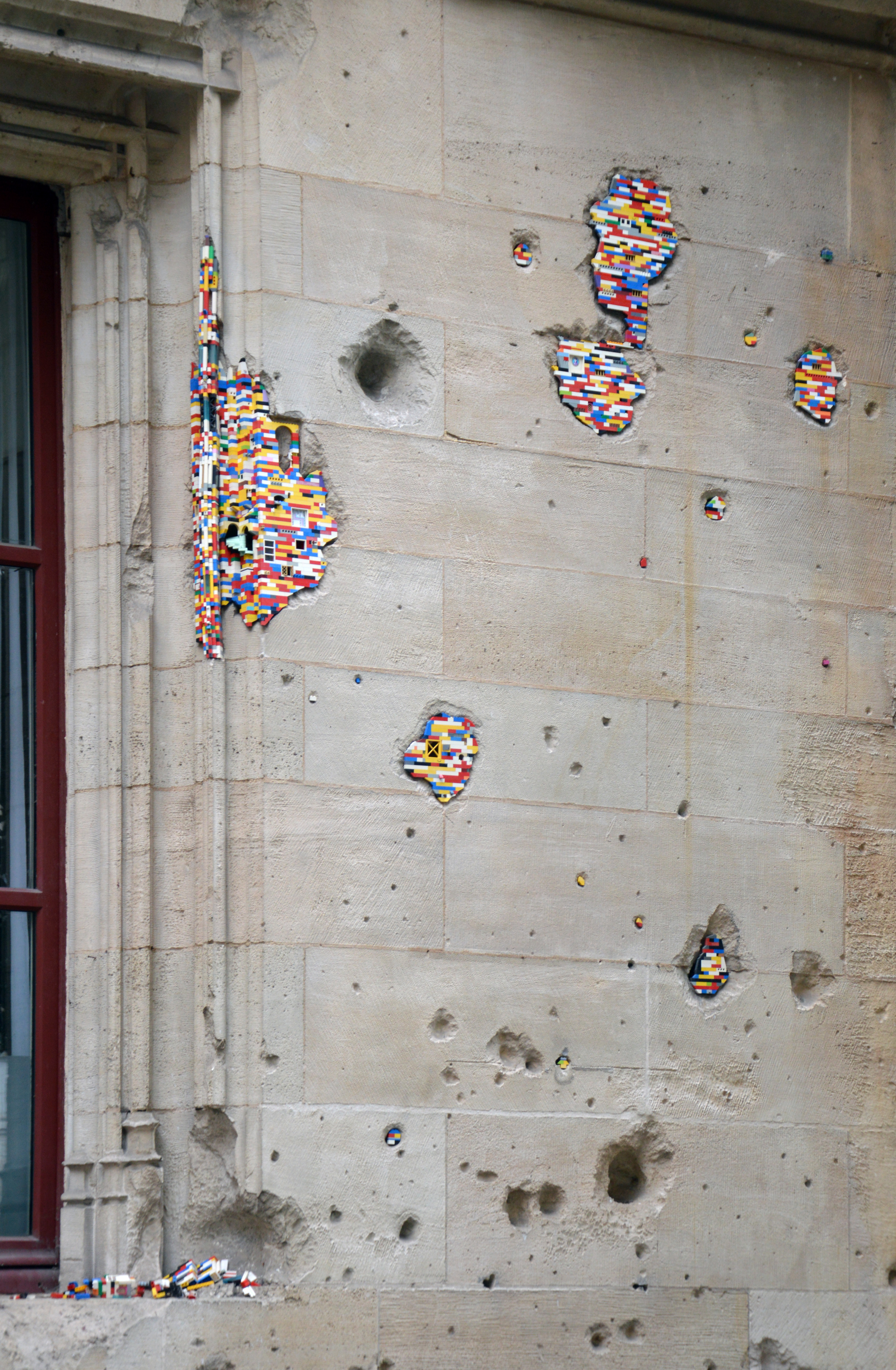
Temporary Lego installation on the facade of the Palais de Justice in Rouen, France (2024)

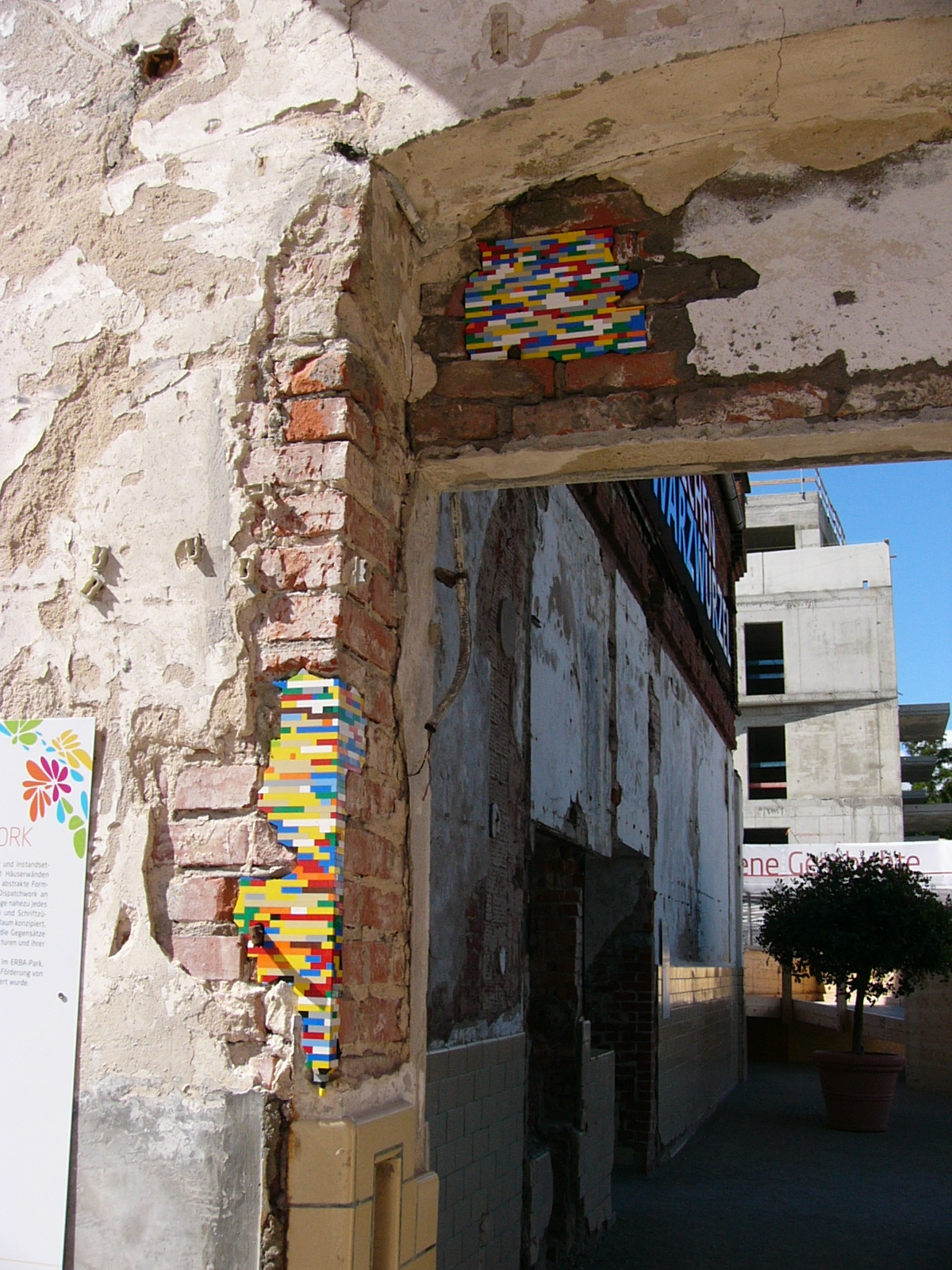
Regional Garden Show in Bamberg, Germany

Vormann was born to a Franco-Tunisian mother and a German father. He studied art history and conservation at the University of Bamberg for one year before switching to fine arts. He graduated in sculpture from the Weißensee Academy of Art Berlin, where he studied under Karin Sander, Bernd Wilde, and Inge Mahn. In 2009–2010, he spent a year at the Stieglitz Academy of Art and Design in Saint Petersburg, Russia.

Vormann's artistic language is characterized by simplicity and social commentary, often delivered through kinetic sculptures, video, and installations in both gallery and public spaces. His visual style is often compared to artists like Octavi Serra, Amparito, and Brad Downey. His most recognized work is Dispatchwork, an ongoing public art project where damaged structures are "repaired" using colorful Lego bricks. Although Vormann has declined sponsorship from Lego manufacturers due to his anti-capitalist stance, the project has grown into a global phenomenon. With the help of an online platform, over 200 installations have been created worldwide, often by participants of all ages launching similar interventions in their cities.

Among his kinetic installations is the "Bubble Lifespan Extender Machine," which uses pumps and motors to keep a soap bubble alive for several days.

Vormann has conducted workshops at institutions like the Amsterdam Centre for Architecture in Amsterdam and the Peggy Guggenheim Collection in Venice. He previously taught creative physics in the Interaction Design department at the Berlin Technische Kunsthochschule and currently teaches in the New Media department at the Austral University of Chile in Valdivia. In 2021, he organized one of the first virtual street art exhibitions within the digital space of the video game Minecraft. In collaboration with Brad Downey and Italian YouTuber Surry (Salvatore Cinquegrana), artists like Vhils, Addfuel, Jazoo Yang, Michael Johansson, Esther Stocker, John Fekner, and Octavi Serra created digital installations on a Minecraft "anarchy server" titled Between Particles and Waves. The project was relaunched in 2022 with the Total Museum of Contemporary Art in Seoul, featuring new participants including Sihoon Kim, Sanghee, and the architectural collective IVAAIU-City.

He has exhibited at institutions such as the Altes Museum in Berlin, presented at the Russian Museum of Contemporary Art in Moscow, and participated in major international events like the Venice Biennale (2012), the Venice Architecture Biennale (French Pavilion, 2018), and La Nuit Blanche in Paris.

In 2020, Vormann created a temporary Lego installation in the bullet-scarred facade of the Palais de Justice, Rouen, inviting the public to contribute Lego bricks and engage in collective memory and restoration.

In 2023, during an artist residency for the Points de Vue Festival, Vormann created a permanent installation in Uhart-Mixe in the Basque Country. Titled LASAI – Fake Abandoned Highway (lasai meaning "calm" or "take it easy" in Basque), the work represents a fictional abandoned highway segment, overrun by nature. It critiques productivity culture and emphasizes slowness, pilgrimage, and reconnecting with the environment.
