= Robert A. Fuhrman =

American engineer

- Born: February 23, 1925; Detroit, Michigan
- Died: November 21, 2009 (aged 84); Pebble Beach, California
- Education: University of Michigan (BSc '45); University of Maryland (MSc '52)
- Spouse: Nan McCormick (m. 1949)

Robert Alexander Fuhrman (February 23, 1925 – November 21, 2009) was an American engineer responsible for the development of the Polaris Missile and Poseidon missile, as well as President and Chief Operating Officer of Lockheed Corporation. Fuhrman was elected to the National Academy of Engineering in 1976 "for contributions to the design and development of the Polaris and Poseidon underwater launch ballistic missile systems".

Fuhrman graduated From the University of Michigan College of Engineering with a bachelor's degree in aeronautical engineering in 1945 and a master's degree in fluid mechanics and dynamics from the University of Maryland in 1952.
