= Joanna Fuhrman =

American poet and professor (born 1972)

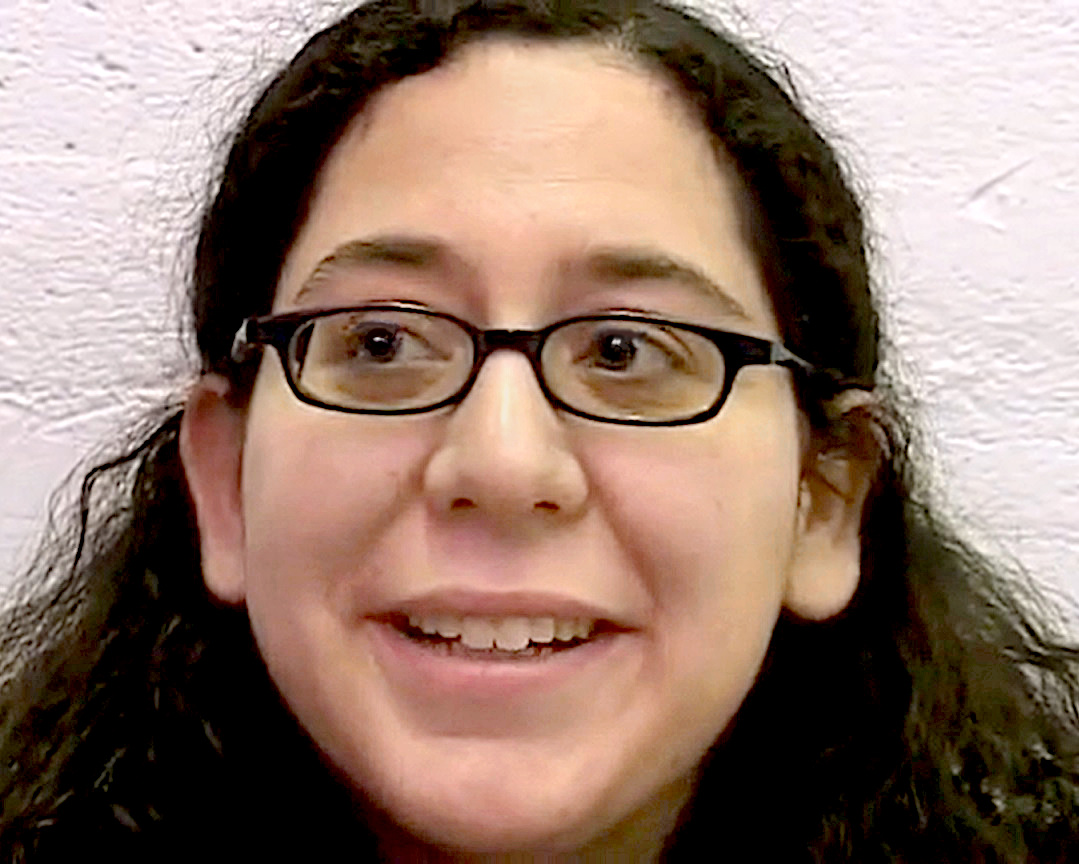
- Joanna Fuhrman circa 2004
- Born: 1972 (age 52–53)
- Genre: poetry

Joanna Furhman (born 1972) is an American poet and professor. She is the author of six collections of poems and her poems have appeared in literary magazines and journals, as well as in anthologies. Fuhrman is a member of the Alice James Books Cooperative Board, and poetry editor for Boog City, a community newspaper for the Lower East Side in New York.

== Life ==
She is a graduate of the University of Washington MFA program. In the past, she taught creative writing in public schools through Poets House. She is currently the Teaching Instructor and Coordinator of Instruction to Creative Writing at Rutgers University. She also teaches creative writing at Sarah Lawrence College's Writing Village, and in libraries through the Teachers & Writers Collaborative. She lives in Brooklyn with her husband, the playwright Robert Kerr.

Fuhrman has also participated in The Sanctuary Project, a concert held by Lunatics at Large.

== Published works ==
=== Collections ===
- The Year of Yellow Butterflies (Hanging Loose Press, 2015) ISBN 9781934909454
- Pageant (Alice James Books, 2009) ISBN 9781882295777
- Moraine (Hanging Loose Press, 2006) ISBN 9781931236539
- Ugh Ugh Ocean (Hanging Loose Press, 2003) ISBN 9781931236188
- Freud in Brooklyn (Hanging Loose Press, 2000) ISBN 9781882413720
- To a New Era (Hanging Loose Press, 2021) ISBN 978-1934909690

=== Select poems ===
- "Return to Normalcy"
- "Glimpsing John Berryman Reborn as a Hasid"
