= Jay Foreman (disambiguation) =

Jay Foreman (born 1984) is an English musical comedian and YouTuber.

Jay Foreman may also refer to:

- Jay Foreman (businessman), American businessman
- Jay Foreman (American football) (born 1976), American football linebacker
