= Furman, Alabama =

Unincorporated community in Alabama, United States

- Unincorporated community
- Location within the state of Alabama Furman, Alabama (the United States)
- Coordinates: 32°0′24.53″N 86°58′0.94″W
- Country: United States
- State: Alabama
- County: Wilcox
- Elevation: 292 ft (89 m)
- Time zone: UTC-6 (Central (CST))
  - Summer (DST): UTC-5 (CDT)
- Area code: 334

Furman, also known as Old Snow Hill, is an unincorporated community in Wilcox County, Alabama, United States. The Furman Historic District is included on the National Register of Historic Places.

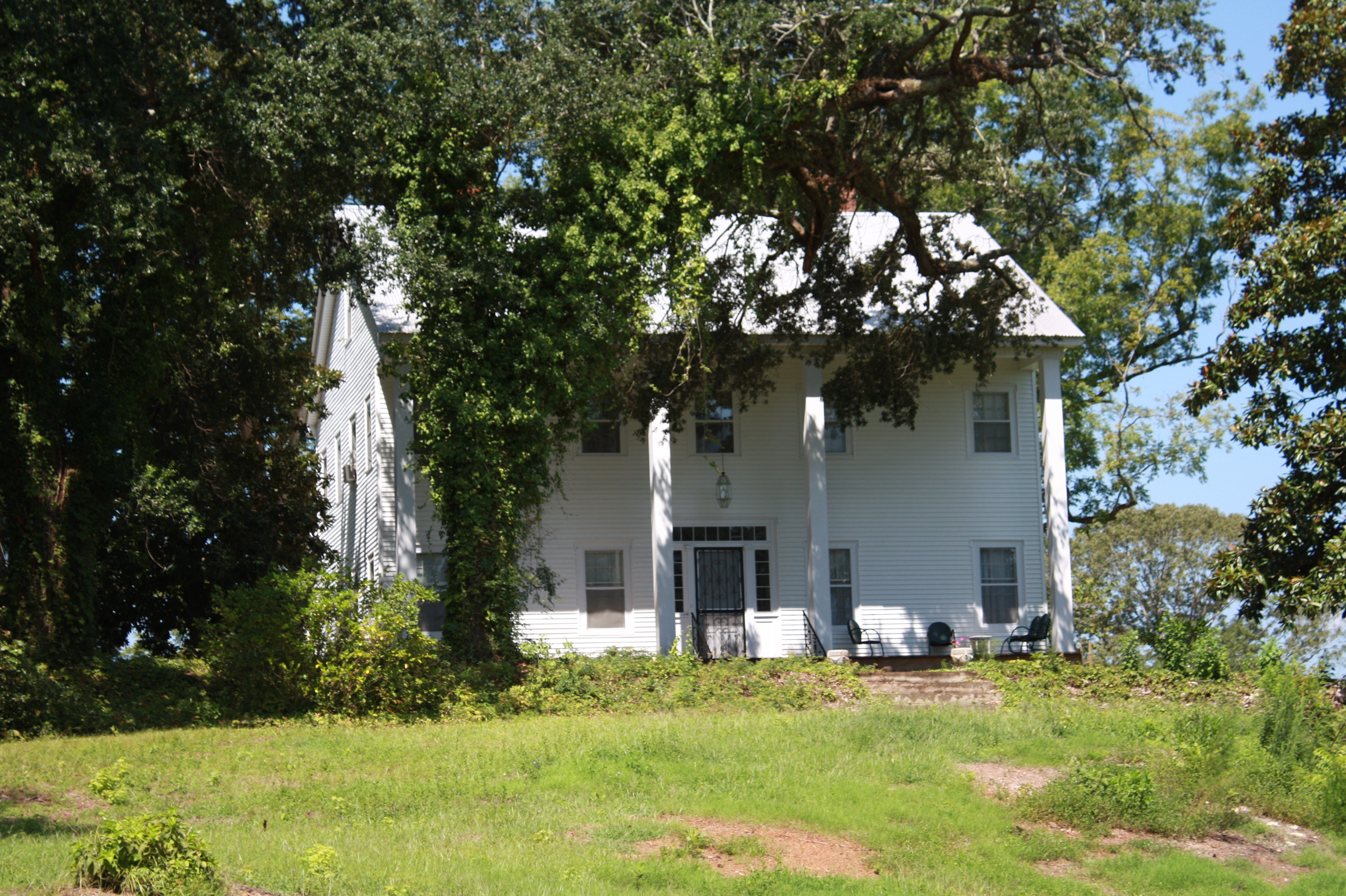
Patience Plantation, completed c. 1842

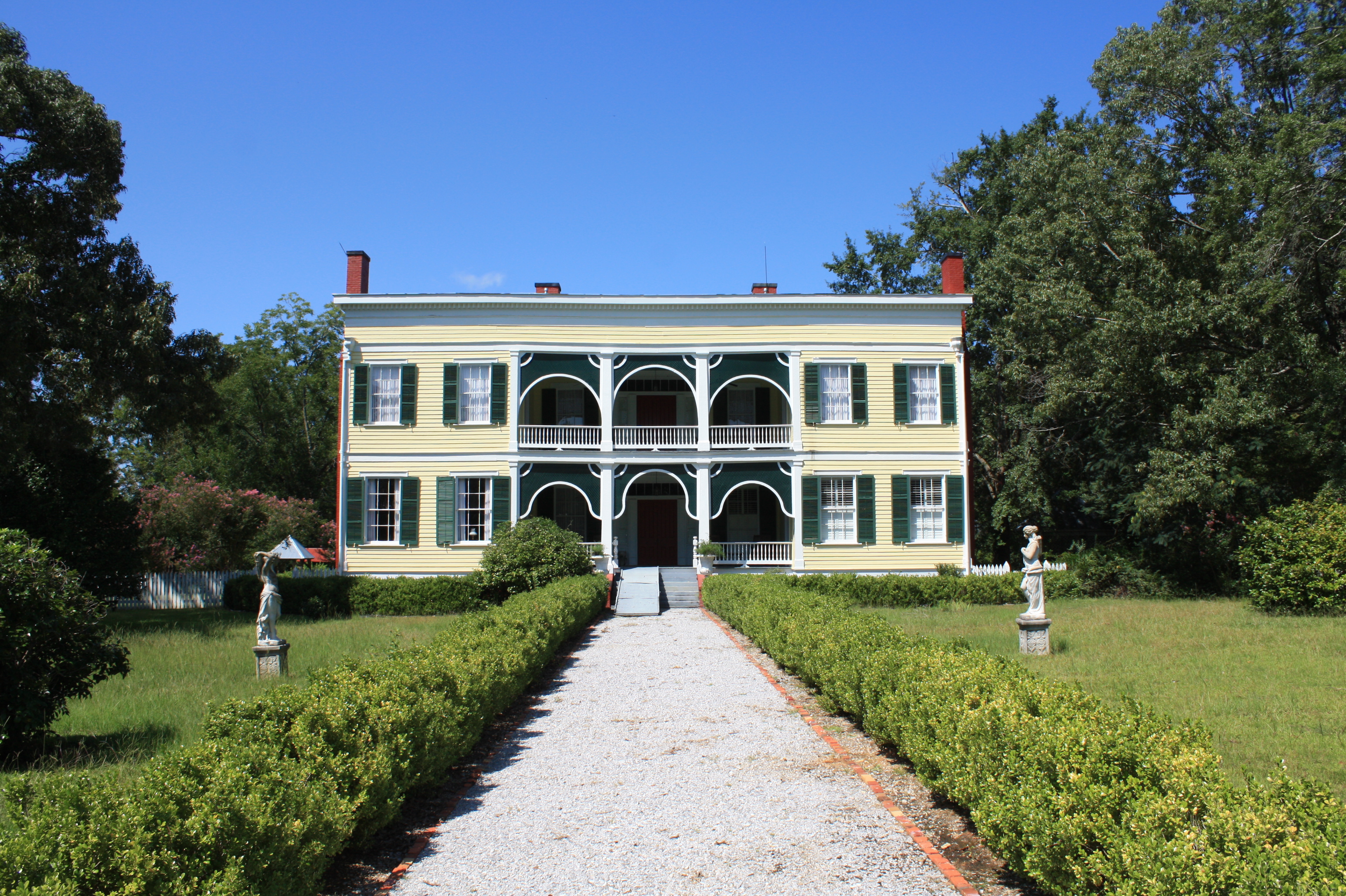
Wakefield Plantation

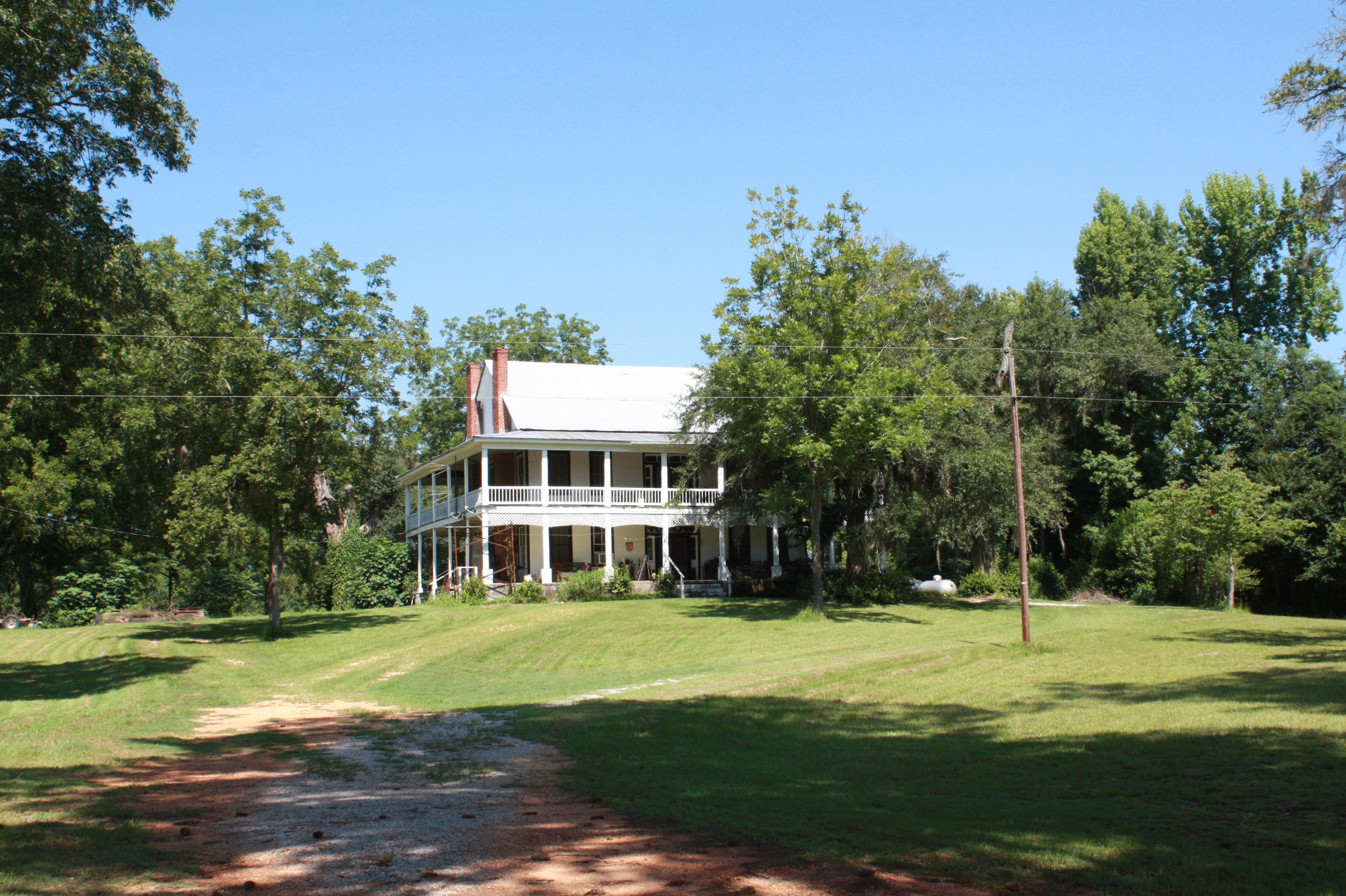
Perdue-Williams Estes House, completed c. 1895

== Demographics ==
Historical population
Census	Pop.	Note	%±
1890	195		—
1900	184		−5.6%
1910	125		−32.1%
1920	190		52.0%
1930	229		20.5%
U.S. Decennial Census

Furman was listed as an incorporated community from 1890 to 1930 on the U.S. Census rolls. It either disincorporated or lost its charter after 1930.

== Geography ==
Furman is located at 32.00681°N 86.96692°W and has an elevation of 292 feet (89 m).
