= Wayne Foreman =

Australian rules footballer

Personal information
- Full name: Wayne Foreman
- Born: 16 May 1955 (age 71)
- Original team: Sunshine (VFA)
- Height: 180 cm (5 ft 11 in)
- Weight: 76 kg (168 lb)

Playing career^{1}
Years	Club	Games (Goals)
1977–79	Footscray	40 (28)
1980–81	Essendon	26 (30)
Total		66 (58)
- ^{1} Playing statistics correct to the end of 1981.

Wayne Foreman (born 16 May 1955) is a former Australian rules footballer who played with Footscray and Essendon in the Victorian Football League (VFL).
