= John Foreman =

John Foreman may refer to:

- John Foreman (musician) (born 1972), Australian musician
- John Foreman (producer) (1925–1992), American film producer
- John Foreman (footballer) (1913–1964), English footballer

== See also ==
- Jon Foreman (born 1976), lead singer of the band Switchfoot
- Jonathan Foreman (journalist) (born 1965), Anglo-American journalist and film critic
- John Forman (disambiguation)
- Jack Foreman Mantle (1917–1940), English recipient of the VC
