= Furman Historic District =

Historic district in Alabama, United States

- U.S. National Register of Historic Places
- U.S. Historic district
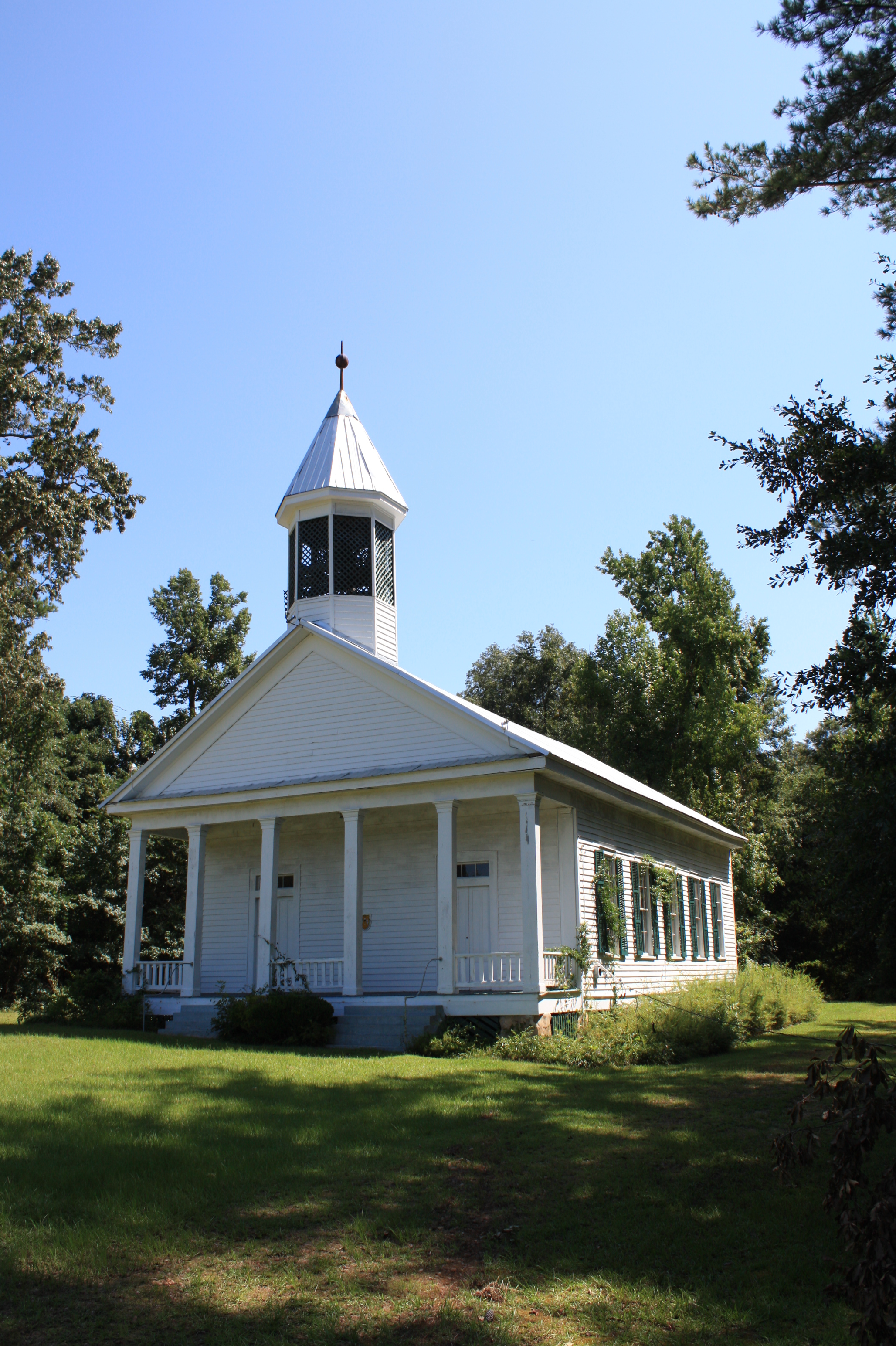
- Furman Methodist Church within the Furman Historic District

- Location within Alabama Location within the United States
- Location: Furman, Alabama
- Coordinates: 32°0′11″N 86°58′2″W
- Architectural style: Greek Revival
- NRHP reference No.: 99000249
- Added to NRHP: May 13, 1999

The Furman Historic District is a historic district in the community of Furman, Alabama, United States. It was placed on the National Register of Historic Places on May 13, 1999. The boundaries are roughly Old Snow Hill Road, Wilcox County Road 59, Burson Road, and AL 21. It contains 1,030 acres (420 ha), 73 buildings, and 14 structures.
