= Wilhelm Fuhrmann =

German mathematician (1833–1904)

Wilhelm Ferdinand Fuhrmann
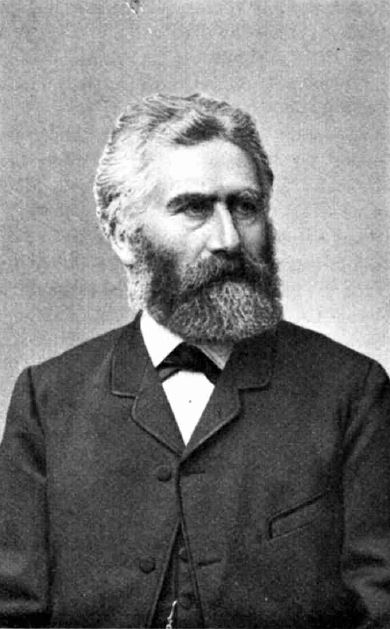
- Born: 28 February 1833; Burg bei Magdeburg, Germany
- Died: 11 June 1904 (aged 71)
- Education: University of Königsberg
- Known for: Fuhrmann circle Fuhrmann triangle
- Scientific career
- Fields: Mathematics
- Workplaces: Burgschule, Königsberg

Wilhelm Ferdinand Fuhrmann (28 February 1833 – 11 June 1904) was a German mathematician. The Fuhrmann circle and the Fuhrmann triangle are named after him.

== Biography ==
Fuhrmann was born on 28 February 1833 in Burg bei Magdeburg. Fuhrmann had shortly worked as sailor before he returned to school and attended the Altstadt Gymnasium in Königsberg, where his teachers noticed his interest and talent in mathematics and geography. He graduated in 1853 and went on to study mathematics and physics at the University of Königsberg. One of his peers later remembered him as the most talented and diligent student of his class. Fuhrmann however despite his talent did not pursue a career at the university, instead he became a math and science teacher at the Burgschule in Königsberg after his graduation. He joined the school in 1860 and remained there until his death in 1904.

Fuhrmann authored several books and a number of papers on different mathematical subjects. Today he is best remembered for his interest in and contribution to elementary geometry. With Synthetische Beweise planimetrischer Sätze he wrote an influential book on the subject and in 1890 he published an article entitled Sur un nouveau cercle associé à un triangle in the Belgian math journal Mathesis. In this article Fuhrmann described the circle and the triangle that now carry his name.

== Publications ==
=== Papers ===
- Transformationen der Theta-Funktionen (1864)
- Einige Untersuchungen über die Abhängigkeit geometrischer Gebilde (1869)
- Einige Anmerkungen der projektiven Eigenschaften der Figuren (1875)
- Aufgaben über Kegelschnitte (1879)
- Aufgaben aus der niederen Analysis (1886)
- Der Brocardsche Winkel (1889)
- "Sur un nouveau cercle associé à un triangle". In: Mathesis, 1890 (English translation)
- Sätze und Aufgaben aus der sphärischen Trigonometrie (1894)
- Beiträge zur Transformation algebraisch-trigonometrischer Figuren Teil 1 (1898)
- Beiträge zur Transformation algebraisch-trigonometrischer Figuren Teil 2 (1899)
- Kollineare und orthologische Dreiecke (1902)
- Aufgaben aus der analytischen Geometrie (1904, post mortem)

=== Books ===
- Synthetische Beweise planimetrischer Sätze. Berlin: L. Simion, 1890. Heute: Wentworth Press, 2018, ISBN 9780270116830 (online copy in the Internet Archive)
- Kollineare und orthologische Dreiecke. Königsberg: Hartung, 1902.
- Wegweiser in der Arithmetik, Algebra und niedern Analysis. Leipzig: Teubner, 1886.
