= Lucy Furman =

American writer (1870–1958)

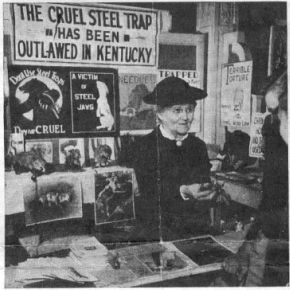
- Born: June 7, 1870 Henderson, Kentucky
- Died: August 24, 1958 (aged 88) Cranford, New Jersey
- Occupation: Writer
- Period: early 20th century
- Literary movement: Appalachian Literature

Lucy S. Furman (June 7, 1870 – August 24, 1958) was an American novelist, short story writer, and animal welfare activist. Her fiction was a foundational influence on what would become Appalachian literature.

== Biography ==
Lucy Furman was born in Henderson County, Kentucky on June 7, 1869. After her parents’ death early in her life, she moved to Evansville, Indiana. She eventually returned to Kentucky to attend Sayre School in Lexington, graduating in 1885. Upon her graduation, she moved to Shreveport, Louisiana, before moving back to Evansville, where she would live and work independently. In 1894, Century Magazine published some of Furman's short stories. The magazine began to serialize these stories, which were based on her observations of Henderson. Then in 1896, Century collected the short stories into a book titled, Stories of a Sanctified Town.

After this publication, Furman moved to Hindman Settlement School, where she became the school's first director of grounds, gardens, and livestock. During her twenty years' service there, she fictionalized her observations into stories that were published by The Atlantic and Century Magazine, then later collected in best-selling novels such as Mothering on Perilous (1913), Sight to the Blind (1914), The Quare Women (1923), The Glass Window (1924), and The Lonesome Road (1927). For her work as a southern female writer, Furman earned the George Fort Milton Award in 1932.

In 1953, she retired and moved to Cranford, New Jersey, where she lived with her nephew. She died there on August 25, 1958.

== Anti-Steel Trap League ==
Furman was an advocate of animal welfare and eschewed furs. While known for her writing, Furman was also vice-president of the Anti-Steel Trap League of Washington, DC, writing, publishing, and lecturing widely on the subject. In 1934, Furman proposed an anti-steel trap bill to Kentucky's General Assembly.

To pass the League's bill it would abolish trapping entirely but the legislators were unwilling to do this. Furman received help from Vernon Bailey who had patented a humane animal trap. The trap known as a "Verbail trap" did not have steel jaws but a chain circle which contracted around the animal's foreleg. Furman became a supporter of Bailey's humane trap and convinced the Animal Trap Company of America to manufacture the device. The bill passed and took effect in 1940. The Anti-Steel Trap League compromised on its early position and in the end did not oppose trapping or animal killing, it wanted it done humanely with the least amount of pain.

== Bibliography ==
- Stories of a Sanctified Town (1896)
- Mothering on Perilous (1913)
- Sight to the Blind (1914)
- The Quare Women (1923)
- The Glass Window (1925)
- The Lonesome Road (1927)
