= Fuhrmann =

Fuhrmann (German for "carter") is a German surname. Notable people with the surname include:

- Adam Fuhrmann (born 1989), American NASA astronaut candidate and Air Force major
- André Fuhrmann (born 1958), German philosopher
- Bärbel Fuhrmann (born 1940), German swimmer
- Dagmar Fuhrmann (born 1954), German sprinter
- Detlef Fuhrmann (born 1953), German athlete
- Emma Fuhrmann (born 2001), American film actress and model
- Ernst Fuhrmann (1918–1995), chairman of Porsche AG in the 1970s
- Inge Fuhrmann (born 1936), German sprinter
- Irene Fuhrmann (born 1980), Austrian former football player
- Karl-Heinz Fuhrmann (born 1937), German equestrian
- Louis P. Fuhrmann (1868–1931), Mayor of the City of Buffalo, New York
- Manfred Fuhrmann (1925–2005), German philologist
- Otto Fuhrmann (1871–1945), Swiss parasitologist who specialized in the field of helminthology
- Petra Fuhrmann (1955–2019), Austrian politician
- Susan Fuhrmann (born 1986), Australian retired international netball player
- Wilhelm Fuhrmann (1833–1904), German mathematician
