= Furman, Alberta =

Locality in Alberta, Canada

Coordinates: 49.96676°N 113.98522°W

Furman is a locality in Alberta, Canada.

The community has the name of John Furman, a pioneer citizen.
