= Amanda Foreman =

Amanda Foreman may refer to:

- Amanda Foreman (actress) (born 1966), American actress
- Amanda Foreman (historian) (born 1968), British/American biographer and historian
