= George Foreman (disambiguation) =

George Foreman (1949–2025) was an American professional boxer.

George Foreman may also refer to:

- George Foreman (footballer) (1914–1969), English footballer
- George Foreman III (born 1983), entrepreneur, boxer, and son of George Foreman

== See also ==
- George Foreman Grill, an electrically heated grill promoted by George Foreman
- George V. Forman, American businessman
