= John Forman (martyr) =

English Protestant martyr (died 1556)

John Forman was a Protestant martyr burned at the stake in East Grinstead, England, on 18 July 1556 along with Thomas Dungate (or Dougate) and Anne Tree (or Try).
