= RLB =

RLB may refer to:

- Raiffeisenlandesbanken, co-operative banks in Austria
- Railroad Labor Board, arbitrated labor disputes in 1920s United States
- Reconciliation and Liberation Bloc, Iraqi political party, 1995–2008
- Reichslandbund, an agrarian political association of Weimar Germany.
- Rider Levett Bucknall, a British-based global construction company founded by David Bucknall
- Reichsluftschutzbund, air raid protection organisation in Nazi Germany
- Rebecca Long-Bailey (born 1979), British politician
- Régis Le Bris (born 1975), French football manager
