= Rob Leslie-Carter =

British engineer

- Born: 24 October 1970 (age 56); Oxford, Oxfordshire, England
- Occupation: Architect
- Awards: UK Association for Project Management awards 'Project Manager of the Year' 2003
- Practice: Rider Levett Bucknall
- Buildings: Laban Dance Centre, London; The Water Cube, Beijing

Rob Leslie-Carter
Personal information
- Position: Sweeper

Senior career*
Years	Team	Apps	(Gls)
1992–1996	Gateshead Hockey Club	84	(92)
1996–2000	Hampstead and Westminster Hockey Club	85	(2)
- * Club domestic league appearances and goals

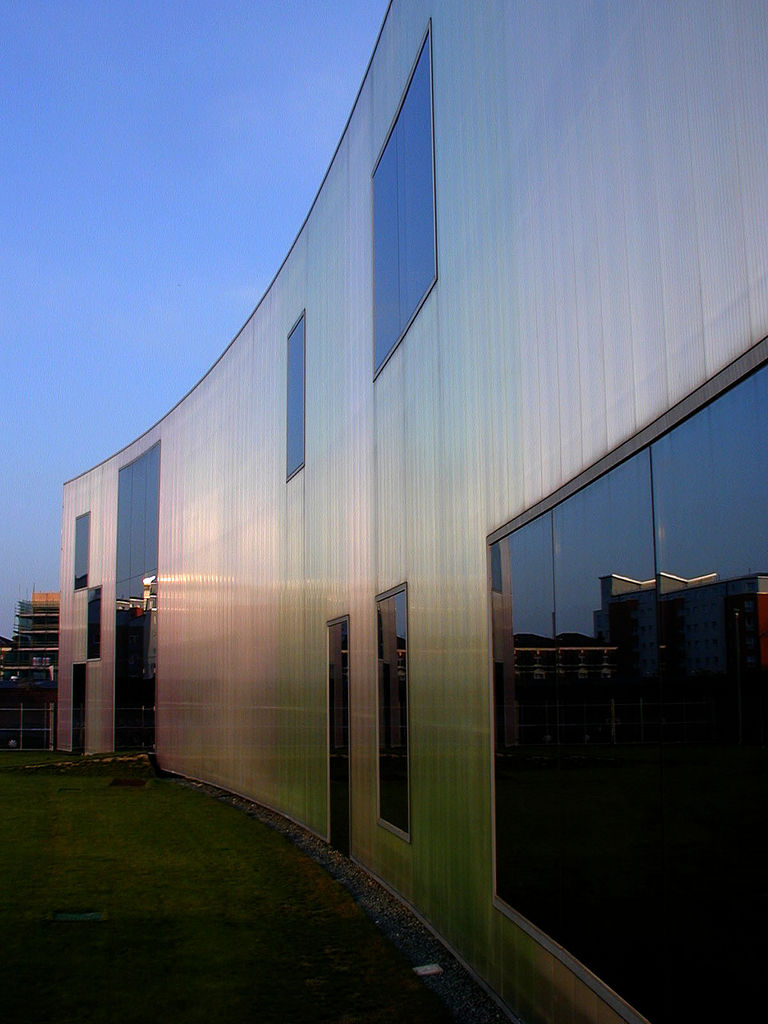
Laban won the 2003 Stirling Prize for Architecture

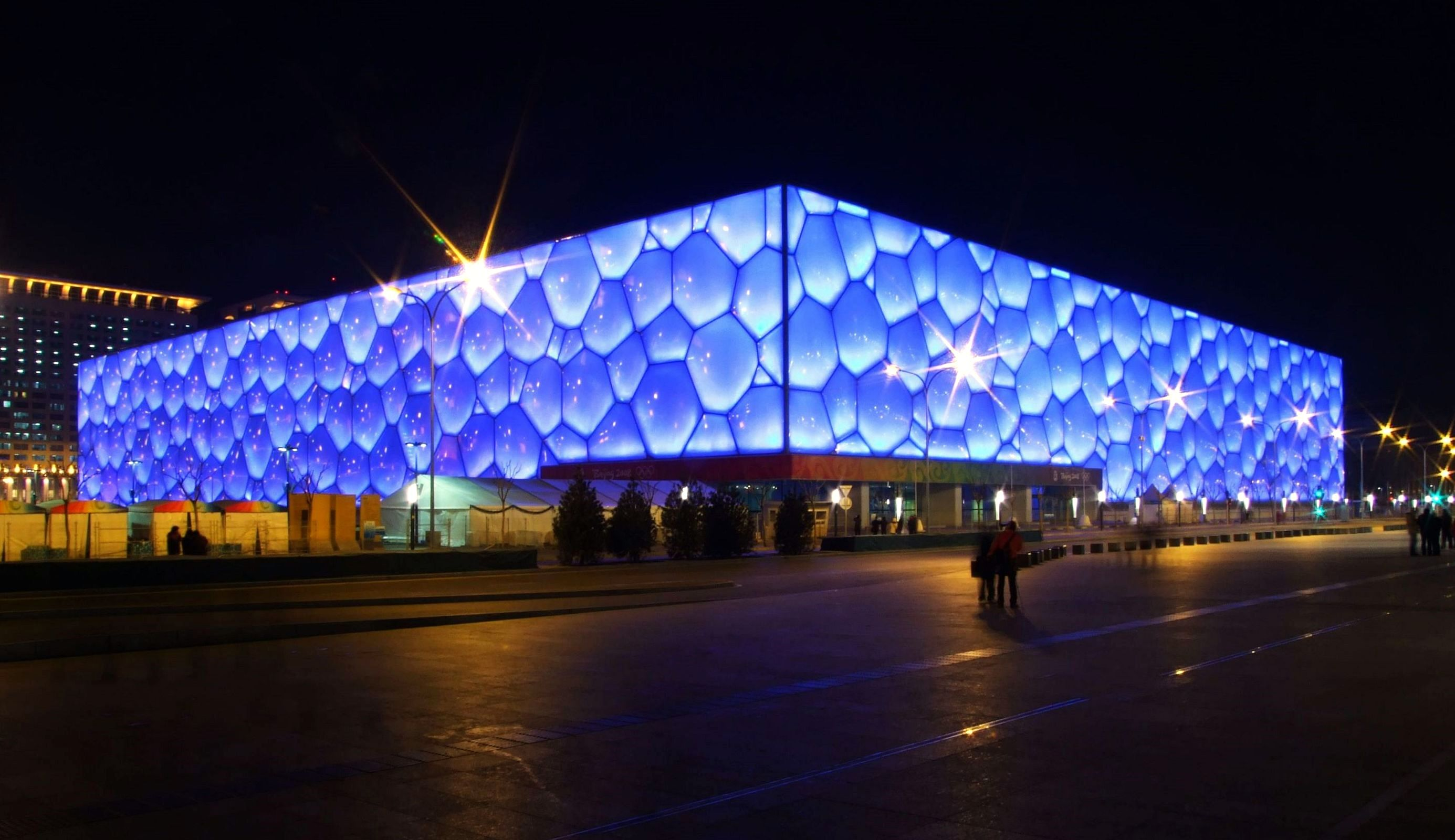
The Water Cube, Beijing

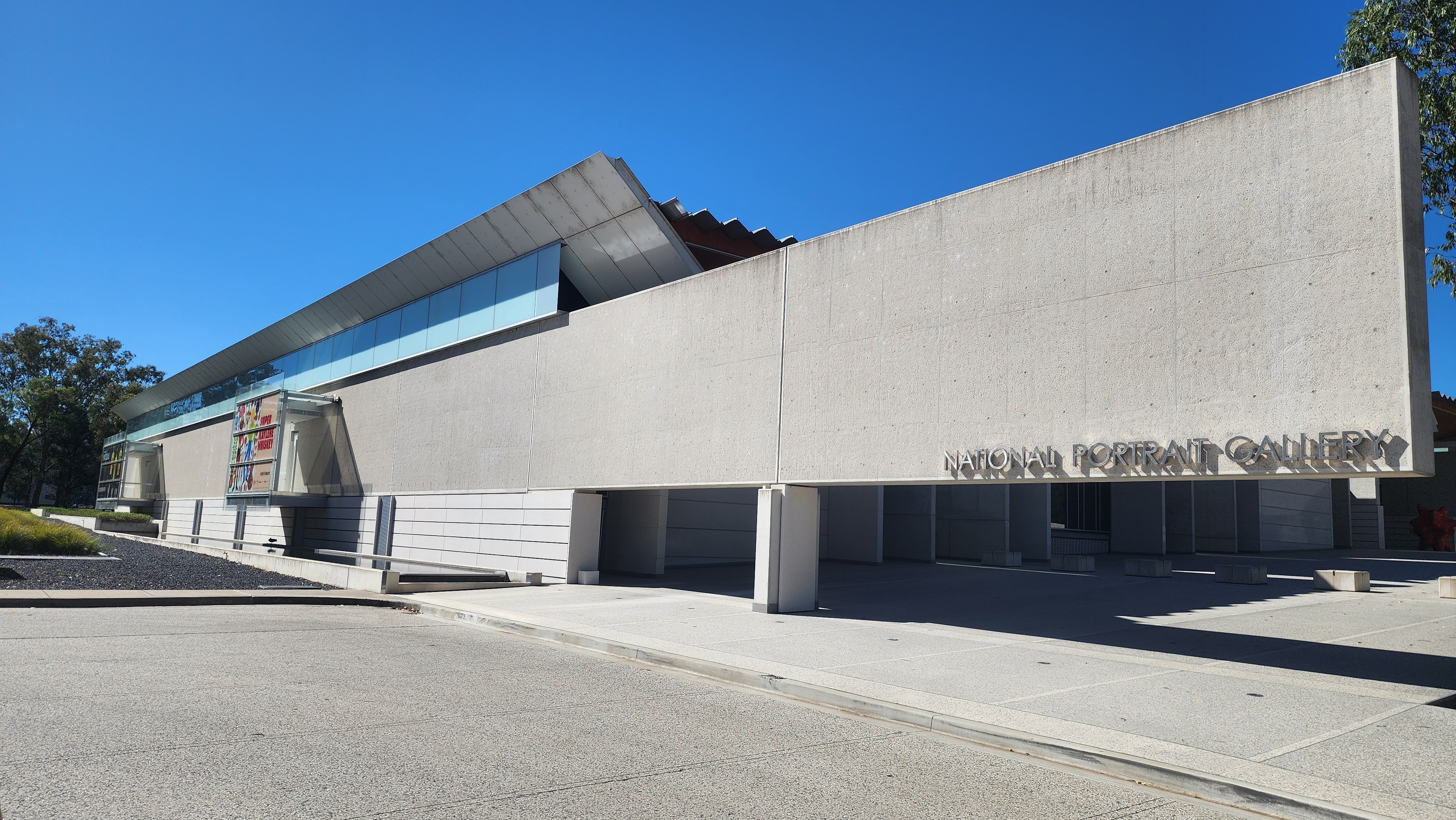
The new National Portrait Gallery building

Middlehaven Redevelopment including the new Riverside Stadium

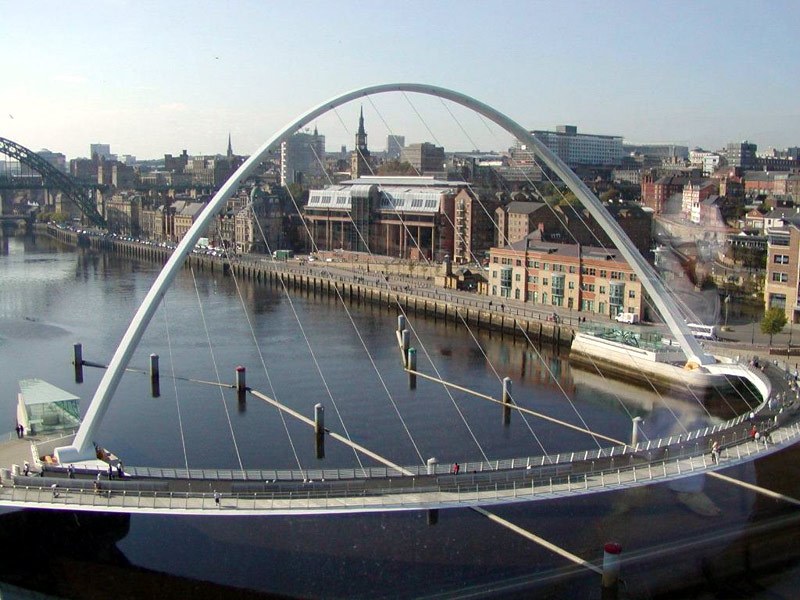
Newcastle Quayside Redevelopment

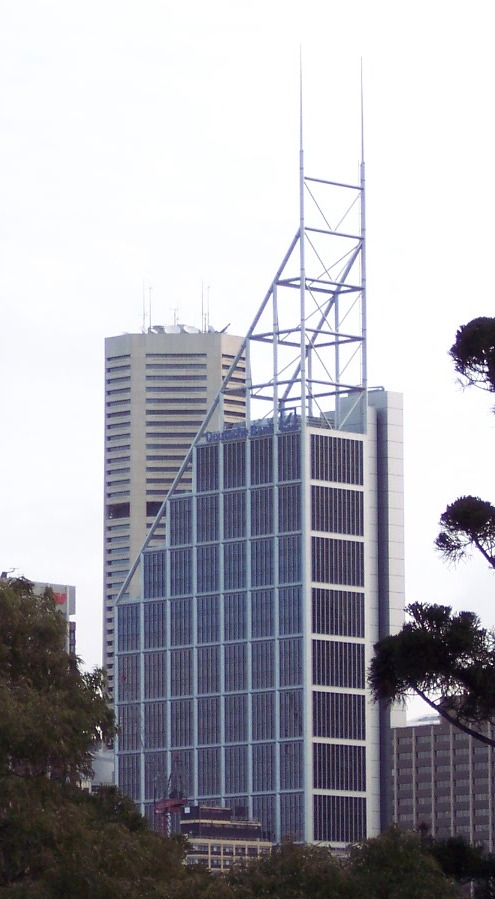
Deutsche Bank Place, Sydney

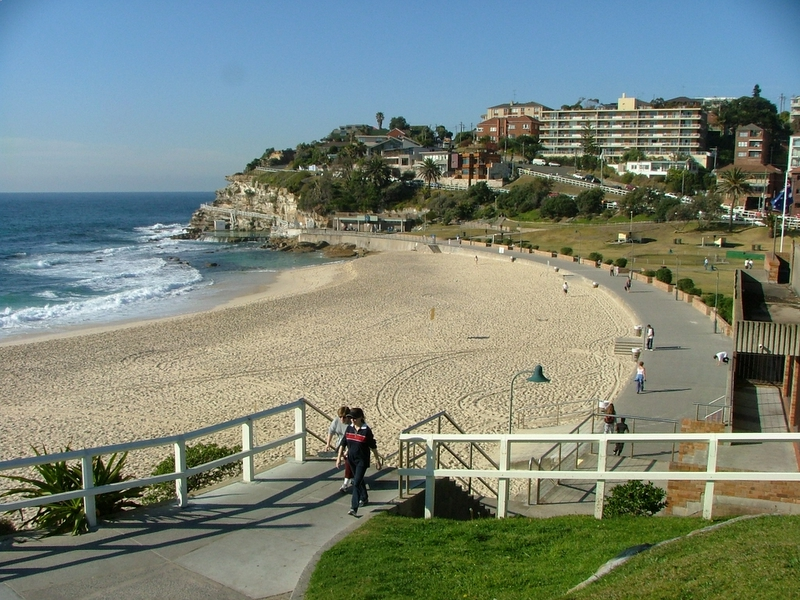
Bronte, in Sydney's Eastern Suburbs

Robert Michael Leslie-Carter MICE, MAIPM (born 24 October 1970) is a British engineer and project manager with construction consultancy Rider Levett Bucknall. He is a guest lecturer at the Bartlett at UCL and previously at University of New South Wales, and a regular public speaker on leadership, project management, organisational culture, the future of work, and the road to Net Zero. He has published several Academic Papers, and in 2018 he was lead author of 'Future of Project Management'.

He was named 'Project Manager of the Year' at the 2003 UK Association for Project Management awards for his role leading the new Laban Dance School in Deptford, London. In 2008 he collected the 'International Project of the Year' awards from both the Australian Institute of Project Management and the UK Association for Project Management for managing Arup's design team on the Water Cube in Beijing.

In 2009 the Association for Project Management named him one of the top 10 project influencers in the world. The 'impact list' highlights individuals who have had the biggest influence on the project management profession – recognised for shaping major programs and projects and also for inspiring and motivating others in their profession.

In 2015 he was awarded the UK Building International Project of the Year award for his role on the New Acton Nishi development in Canberra, and the MCA Innovation Project of the Year award for his work on the Croydon Integrated Five Year delivery Plan with Croydon Council.

In 2024 he was named in Project Management Institute list of global sustainability influencers. He was a founder member of the PMI UK Sustainability Community of Action, and collaborated with the PMI developing a thought leadership series as part of COP26.

== Project Management career ==
Leslie-Carter is a project manager with construction consultancy Ryder Levett Bucknall, having worked with Arup since graduating from Bristol University in 1992 until 2023.

From 1998 to 2002, Leslie-Carter was Client Project Manager for the Laban Dance School in Deptford, south-east London. He was named 'Project Manager of the Year' at the 2003 UK Association for Project Management Awards, for his leadership of the project. Designed by Swiss architects Jacques Herzog and Pierre de Meuron, Laban also won the Stirling Prize for Architecture in 2003, the UK Royal Fine Arts Commission Trust Award, and a High Commendation at the British Construction Industry Awards. In 2008, five years after it opened, Laban was named Britain's most inspiring building by the Daily Telegraph.

Between 2003 and 2008, Leslie-Carter managed Arup's multi-disciplinary design team for the Beijing National Aquatics Centre (the Water Cube), for the 2008 Summer Olympics. In 2008 Leslie-Carter collected the 'International Project of the Year' awards from both the Australian Institute of Project Management and the UK Association for Project Management for his role on the Water Cube. Working with PTW Architects, and CSCEC International Design. The Water Cube also won the 2004 Venice Biennale Architecture Awards, the Sir William Hudson Award at the Australian Engineering Excellence Awards, and the MacRobert Award – the UK's biggest prize for engineering innovation.

Between 2009 and 2012 Leslie-Carter led Arup's Project Management team on NewActon Nishi - 'Australia's most sustainable building' and the centrepiece of Canberra's award-winning NewActon precinct. Nishi was named International Project of the year at the 2015 UK Building Awards.

== Hockey career ==
Leslie-Carter played 1st Grade club hockey from 1989 to 2000. Having represented Oxfordshire County, he played in the University of Bristol 1st XI side that won the British Universities and Colleges Sport title in 1992.

From 1992 to 1996, Leslie-Carter played in Newcastle for Gateshead Hockey Club (formerly Swalwell Hockey Club). He was top scorer for the club in the 94/95 (19 goals) and 95/96 (24 goals) seasons. His goals, mainly from short corner strikes, helped Swalwell to promotion to the Northern Premier League in 1996, and back-to-back Northumberland Cup wins. Leslie-Carter played in many UK hockey tournaments with North East touring side 'The Pallatics', winning three tournament titles at the Glaxo Hockey Festival in 1997, 1998 and 2000. In his final appearance for 'The Pallatics', he scored 11 goals in a match at the Portsmouth Islanders Tournament in 2000. He also played full county level for Northumberland in the 1994 and 1995 National County Championships.

From 1996 he played three seasons in the 1st XI for Hampstead and Westminster Hockey Club. Throughout his time at H&W, he played in a central sweeper role. In his first 1996/97 season, under player coach and Great Britain international Rob Thompson, H&W won the Southern Premier League undefeated, and were promoted to the English National League after winning the playoff tournament at the National Hockey Stadium in Milton Keynes. In the 1997/98 season, H&W finished fifth in National League Division 1 – its best place to date – with Leslie-Carter at the centre of a defence with the best record in the league. During his time with Hampstead and Westminster, Leslie-Carter played in international hockey tournaments in the Netherlands, Germany and around the UK.

== Selected Projects ==
Rob Leslie-Carter's major projects include:

=== Completed ===
- Laban School of Dance & Visual Arts, London
- Beijing National Aquatics Centre (The Water Cube)
- New Acton Nishi Development
- Barangaroo Redevelopment
- Greenhouse by Joost, Sydney
- Croydon Five Year Integrated Delivery Plan
- North Sea Link Interconnector
- Deutsche Bank Global Program including Deutsche Bank Place, Sydney and One Raffles Quay, Singapore
- Randwick Racecourse Redevelopment, NSW
- National Portrait Gallery Australia, Canberra
- Middlehaven Redevelopment including the new Riverside Stadium for Middlesbrough F.C.
- Newcastle Quayside Redevelopment
- Manchester Airport Terminal 3
- Nation Building Economic Stimulus Program, NSW
- Brisbane Airport Domestic Terminal Expansion, QLD

=== In Progress ===
- Social Housing Decarbonisation Fund
- North London Heat and Power Project
- High Speed 2 Phase 2b including Leeds station

=== Published Academic Papers and Research ===
- Future of Project Management
- Leslie-Carter R and Zou P (2013) Business Relationship Development and Management in China – The Australia-China Investment Relationship Law, Governance and Policy
- Leslie-Carter R and Zou P (2010) Lessons Learned from Managing the Design of the “Water Cube” National Swimming Centre for Beijing 2008 Olympic Games
