= Henri Barki =

Turkish-Canadian social scientist (1950–2026)

Henri Barki (July 15, 1950 – May 19, 2026) was a Turkish-Canadian social scientist, who was a Canada Research Chair at HEC Montréal, Université de Montréal until he retired in 2017. He was given the title of emeritus. Barki died on May 19, 2026, at the age of 75.

== Education ==
- 1980–1984 PhD, School of Business Administration, The University of Western Ontario, London, Ontario, Canada
- 1972–1974 MA, School of Business Administration, Bogaziçi University, Istanbul, Türkiye
- 1968–1972 BSc, School of Electrical Engineering, Bogaziçi University

== Contributions ==
Barki was well known name in the information systems community. He was a professor at HEC Montréal from 1989 until his retirement in June 2017, and holder of the Canada Research Chair in Information Technology Implementation and Management (2003–2017), he held several key administrative positions, including Director of Research (1998–2001). A highly accomplished scholar, he authored numerous publications in information systems, supervised more than 40 master’s and doctoral students, and served in leading editorial roles of peer-reviewed journals in information systems.

He was elected a Fellow of the Royal Society of Canada in 2003.

== Partial bibliography ==
=== Scholarly publications with Henri Barki as the lead author ===
A Contingency Model of DSS Success: An Empirical Investigation
Barki, Henri
ProQuest Dissertations Publishing; 1984

Implementing Decision Support Systems: A Research Framework
Barki, Henri; Huff, Sid L.
Canadian Journal of Administrative Sciences / Revue Canadienne des Sciences de l'Administration, June 1984, 1(1): 95–110

Change, attitude to change, and decision support system success
Barki, Henri; Huff, Sid L.
Information & Management, 1985, 9(5): 261–268

An Information Systems Keyword Classification Scheme
Barki, Henri; Rivard, Suzanne; Talbot, Jean
MIS Quarterly, June 1988, 12(2): 299

Rethinking The Concept Of User Involvement
Barki, Henri; Hartwick, Jon
MIS Quarterly, March 1989, 13(1): 53

Implementing Decision Support Systems: Correlates of User Satisfaction and System Usage
Barki, Henri; Huff, Sid
INFOR, May 1990, 28(2): 89

The Measurement of Risk in an Information System Development Project
Barki, Henri; Rivard, Suzanne; Talbot, Jean
Revue Canadienne des Sciences de l'Administration/Canadian Journal of Administrative Sciences, September 1992, 9(3): 213–228

A Keyword Classification Scheme for IS Research Literature: An Update
Barki, Henri; Rivard, Suzanne; Talbot, Jean
MIS Quarterly, June 1993, 17(2): 209–226

Toward an Assessment of Software Development Risk
Barki, Henri; Rivard, Suzanne; Talbot, Jean
Journal of Management Information Systems, September 1993, 10(2): 203–225

Measuring User Participation, User Involvement, and User Attitude
Barki, Henri; Hartwick, Jon
MIS Quarterly, 1 March 1994, 18(1): 59–82

User participation, conflict, and conflict resolution: The mediating roles of influence
Barki, Henri; Hartwick, Jon
Information Systems Research, December 1994, 5(4): 422

An Integrative Contingency Model of Software Project Risk Management
Barki, Henri; Rivard, Suzanne; Talbot, Jean
Journal of Management Information Systems, March 2001, 17(4): 37–69

Small Group Brainstorming and Idea Quality: Is Electronic Brainstorming the Most Effective Approach?
Barki, Henri; Pinsonneault, Alain
Small Group Research, April 2001, 32(2): 158–205

Interpersonal Conflict and Its Management in Information System Development
Barki, Henri; Hartwick, Jon
MIS Quarterly, June 2001, 25(2): 195–228

Conceptualizing the Construct of Interpersonal Conflict
Barki, Henri; Hartwick, Jon
International Journal of Conflict Management, March 2004, 15(3): 216–244

A Model of Organizational Integration, Implementation Effort, and Performance
Barki, Henri; Pinsonneault, Alain
Organization Science, 2005, 16(2): 165–179

EIS Implementation Research: An Assessment and Suggestions for the Future
(book chapter)
Barki, Henri; Chen, Chin-Sheng (Editor); Filipe, Joaquim (Editor); Seruca, Isabel (Editor); Cordeiro, José (Editor)
Dordrecht: Springer Netherlands; 2006
Enterprise Information Systems VII, pp. 3–10

Information System Use–Related Activity: An Expanded Behavioral Conceptualization of Individual-Level Information System Use
Barki, Henri; Titah, Ryad; Boffo, Céline
Information Systems Research, 2007, 18(2): 173–192

Thar's gold in them thar constructs
Barki, Henri
ACM SIGMIS Database: The Database for Advances in Information Systems, October 2008, 39(4): 90

Linking IT Implementation and Acceptance via the Construct of Psychological Ownership of Information Technology
Barki, Henri; Pare, Guy; Sicotte, Claude
Journal of Information Technology, December 2008, 23(4): 269–280

El Khatib, R. and H. Barki, “How different rewards tend to influence employee non-compliance with information security policies”, Information and Computer Security, (2021).

Shuraida, S. and H. Barki, “Does Supplementing IS Analysts’ User Observations with hands-on Training Help them Better Understand Users’ work?” MIS Transactions on Human Computer Interaction, 13, 2 (July 2021), 145–173.

Savoli, A., H. Barki and G. Paré, “Examining How Chronically Ill Patients’ Reactions to, and Effective Use of Information Technology can Influence How Well They Self-manage their Illness,” MIS Quarterly Special Issue, 44, 1 (March 2020), 351–389.

Grange, C. and H. Barki, “The Nature and Role of User Beliefs Regarding a Website’s Design Quality,” Journal of Organizational and End User Computing, 32, 1 (January 2020), 75–96.

El Khatib, R. and H. Barki, “Habits in Organizational Contexts: Information Systems Routines, Cues, and Rewards,” Canadian Journal of Administrative Sciences (2020: 1–12).

Coulon, T., H. Barki and G. Paré, “Conceptualizing Project Team Momentum: A Review of the Sports Literature,” International Journal of Managing Projects in Business, (August 2019).

Cameron, A.F., H. Barki, A. Ortiz de Guinea, T. Coulon, and H. Moshki, “Multicommunicating in Meetings: Effects of Locus, Topic and Meeting Medium,” Management Communication Quarterly, 32, 3 (July 2018), 303–336.

Shuraida, S., H. Barki, and A. Luong, “Empirical Research in Information Systems 2001-2015,” Foundations and Trends in Information Systems, 2, 3 (May 2018), 237–295.

Savoli, A. and H. Barki, “Effective Use of Patient-Centric Health Information Systems: the Influence of Patient Emotions,” Systèmes d’Information et Management, (French Journal of Management Information Systems), 22, 1 (2017), 71–96.

Cameron, A.F., J. Webster, H. Barki, and A. Ortiz de Guinea, “Four Common Multicommunicating Perceptions,” European Journal of Information Systems, 25, 5 (September 2016), 465–471.

Cheikh-Ammar, M. and H. Barki, “The Influence of Social Presence, Social Exchange and Feedback Features on SNS Continuous Use: The Facebook Context,” Journal of Organizational and End User Computing, 28, 2 (April–June 2016), 33–52.

Sakka, O., H. Barki, and L. Côté, “Relationship between Interactive Use of Control Systems and Information System Project Performance: the Moderating Effects of Uncertainty and Equivocality,” International Journal of Project Management, 34 (April 2016), 508–522.

Barki, H., J. Robert, and A. Dulipovici, “Reconceptualizing Trust: A Non-Linear Boolean Model,” Information & Management, 52, 4 (June 2015), 483–495.

Spears, J.L., H. Barki, and R.B. Barton, “Theorizing the Concept and Role of Assurance in IS Security,” Information & Management, 50, 7 (November 2013), 598–605.

Sakka, O., H. Barki, and L. Côté, “Interactive and diagnostic uses of management control systems in information system projects: Antecedents and impacts on performance,” Information & Management, 50, 6 (September 2013), 265–274.

Shuraida, S. and H. Barki, “The Influence of Analyst Communication in IS Projects,” Journal of the AIS, 14, 9 (September 2013), 482–520.

Barki, H., “Managing Illusions of Control,” Journal of Information Technology, 26 (December 2011), 280–281.

Spears, J. L. and H. Barki, “User Participation in IS Security Risk Management,” MIS Quarterly, 34, 3 (September 2010), 503–522.

Titah, R. and H. Barki, “Non-Linearities between Attitude and Subjective Norms in IT Acceptance: a Negative Synergy?” MIS Quarterly, 33, 4 (December 2009), 827–844.
