= Nneka Abulokwe =

British Nigerian tech entrepreneur

Nneka Abulokwe OBE, FBCS, FAPM
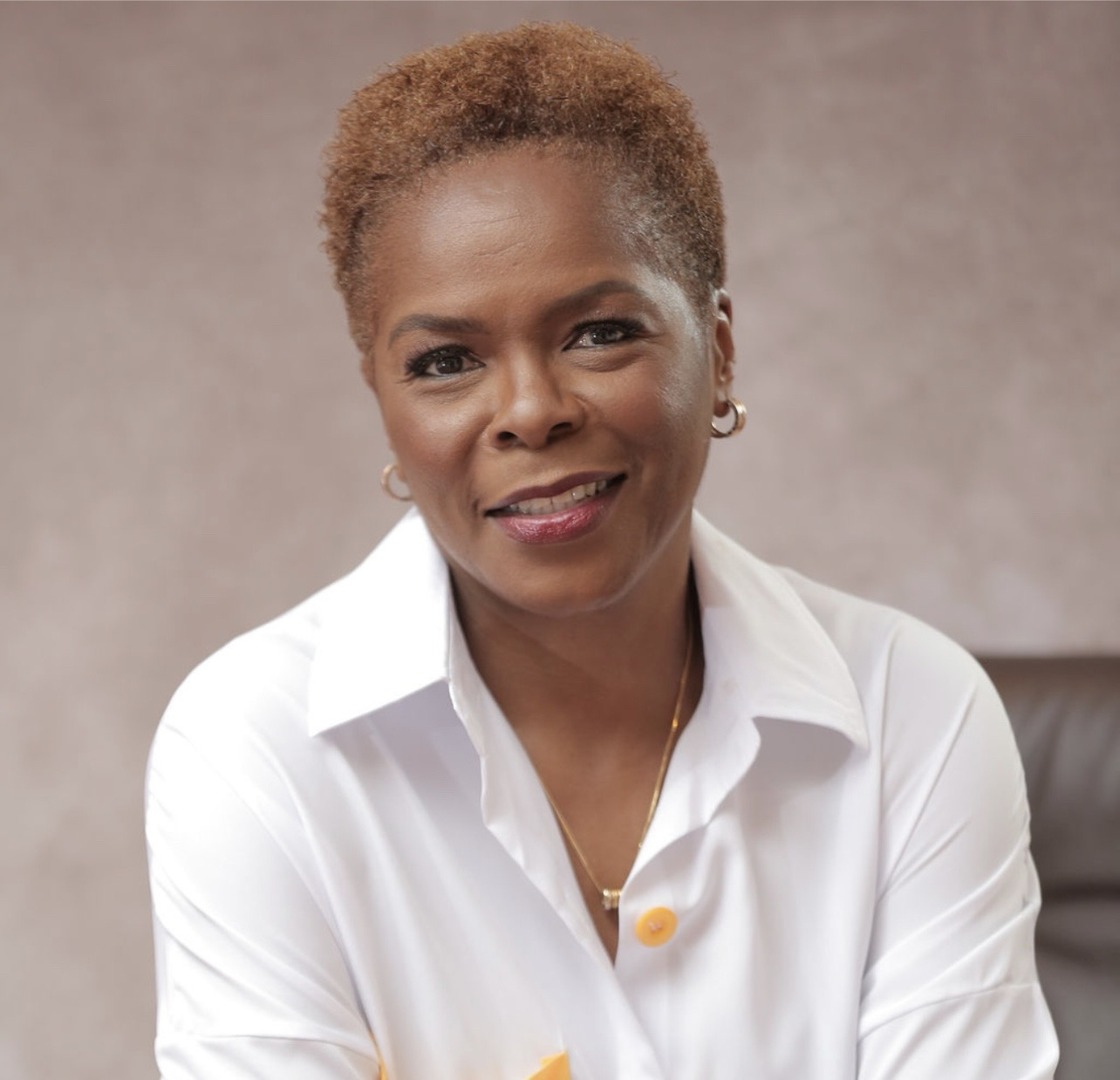
- Citizenship: British
- Known for: MicroMax Consulting
- Awards: Officer of the Order of the British Empire(2019); Financial Times Tech Leaders (2018)
- Scientific career
- Fields: Technology

Nneka Abulokwe (/ŋneka ˈabuːlɔːkwei/) is a British technology and governance entrepreneur, board director and adviser whose work includes AI governance, sustainability and human-centred decision-making. She is one of the first Afro-Caribbean professionals in the UK to serve on the board of a leading European digital transformation organization, she is the founder and CEO of MicroMax Consulting. In 2019, she was honoured by Queen Elizabeth II as an Officer of the British Empire (OBE) for services to Business.

== Early life and education ==
Abulokwe was born in London to a Nigerian father and Jamaican mother and grew up in the city of Port Harcourt, Nigeria.

In 1991, she obtained her BA degree in history from the University of Port Harcourt. She later obtained her MA degree at the University of London. She also has a Doctor of Business Administration DBA degree from Cranfield University School of Management.

== Career ==
Abulokwe is the founder and CEO, MicroMax Consulting. Her work focuses on corporate and technology governance, including board oversight of artificial intelligence and the role of human judgement in technology-enabled decision-making. Her approach to governance is people-centred, emphasising accountability, ownership and the quality of decisions rather than compliance alone.

In 2013, she joined the board/executive committee of Sopra Steria as an executive director. In 2017, Abulokwe became the Chair, Board Nomination Committee Information Systems Audit and Control Association (ISACA). As the chair of the board, she introduced the board nomination process by corporate governance activities. Abulokwe promoted diversity and leadership inclusion among the management of the organization.

In 2020 she was appointed Non-Executive Director, University of Cambridge, on the Audit and Risk Committee and Non-Executive Director for Private Equity backed Davies Group.

In 2022, Abulokwe was appointed Non-Executive Director to the group board of FTSE listed outsourcing and professional services company, Capita, where she is the Chair of the Responsible Business/Environmental, social and governance (ESG) board committee.

She was also appointed External Advisor, Global SteerCo, Shell plc and in 2023 to the Board of Visitors of the University of Oxford Ashmolean Museum.

In 2025, Abulokwe was named on the longlist for the “Most Influential Women in UK Tech”, recognising her contributions to digital governance and leadership in the UK technology sector.

== Awards ==
In 2019, Abulokwe was appointed an Officer of the Order of the British Empire (OBE) by Queen Elizabeth II for Services to Business.

In 2018, she was ranked fourth in the Financial Times Top 100 Black Asian Minority Ethnic (BAME) Tech Leaders.

She was also among the final list of Governance Professional of the Year 2018 Award by the Governance Institute.

In 2019, 2020, 2021, 2022, 2023 Abulokwe was featured on the Power-list 100 as one of the most influential black business leaders, placing her among the UK's 100 most influential black people.

Abulokwe was listed among the 100 most influential people of African and Caribbean origin in the UK.

She became a Freeman of the City of London in January 2019 and a Liveryman of the Worshipful Company of Information Technologists in October 2022.

In 2021, Abulokwe was awarded an Honorary Doctorate of Science from Cranfield University School of Management, in recognition of her service to business and industry.

Abulokwe was awarded Fellowship of The Association for Project Management, FAPM in 2012. She was awarded Fellowship of The Chartered Institute for IT, The British Computer Society, FBCS in 2014.
