= Vullinghs =

Vullinghs can refer to

- Dick Vullinghs (born ca. 1936) Dutch aerospace engineer
- Henri Vullinghs (1883–1945) Dutch parson and resistance leader
