= Karl Bockamp =

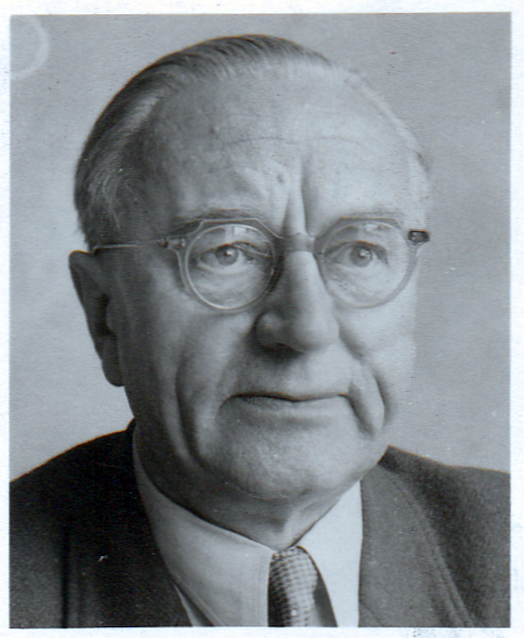
- Karl Bockamp, c. 1948
- Born: Wilhelm Paul Karl Bockamp; 17 September 1891; Duisburg
- Died: 12 May 1965 (aged 73); Cologne
- Education: Heidelberg University
- Occupation: Lawyer
- Organizations: National Socialist Association of Legal Professionals; Reichsluftschutzbund
- Known for: Administration of the Dutch Crown's assets as representative of Reichskommissar Seyss-Inquart
- Political party: German People's Party (DVP); Nazi Party (NSDAP)
- Spouse: Hildegard Olga Johanne née Schmidt (m. 1922; dec'd. 1948)
- Children: 2

Member of the Provincial Parliament of the Rhine Province
- In office 1930–1933
- Constituency: Cologne-Aachen
- Military career
- Allegiance: Wehrmacht and German Reich
- Branch: Imperial German Army
- Service years: WWI: 1913–c. 1918; WWII: 1940–1943
- Rank: First Lieutenant
- Unit: Reserve Field Artillery Regiment 59
- Conflicts: World War I; World War II (reserve)
- Awards: Frontkämpferehrenkreuz; Eisernes Kreuz 1. Klasse; Eisernes Kreuz 2. Klasse
- Other work: Politics; law

Wilhelm Paul Karl Bockamp (born 17 September 1891 in Duisburg; died 12 May 1965 in Cologne) was a German lawyer and reserve first lieutenant in the Wehrmacht. During the occupation of the Netherlands in World War II, as a member of the Nazi Party, Bockamp was entrusted with the administration of the Dutch Crown's assets as representative of Reichskommissar Seyss-Inquart from 1940 onwards. When Hitler ordered the liquidation of the Crown's assets in 1941 because of Queen Wilhelmina's radio broadcasts from London, Bockamp began administering the liquidation process while taking steps to preserve the royal family's cultural assets. He intervened on behalf of Dutch royal court employees who encountered difficulties with the occupying authorities.

== Life ==
=== Family ===
Karl Bockamp was born in Duisburg as the first son of Julius Bockamp (1860–1931), a privy councillor of justice and district court director, and his wife Luise, née Wintzer (1867–1927). Due to his father's job transfers, he spent his school years in Gelsenkirchen, Duisburg-Ruhrort and Cologne. On 30 June 1922, Bockamp married Hildegard Olga Johanne, née Schmidt (1900–1948), and they had two children.

=== Student years ===
After passing his Abitur in Cologne in 1909, he began studying law at the University of Bonn and joined the Burschenschaft „Alemannia Bonn“ at Easter of the same year, as had his father before him and, later, his younger brother Werner (1894–1916). After spending a semester each in Berlin and Munich, he returned to Bonn and completed his legal clerkship examination at the end of 1912. He interrupted his legal traineeship in autumn 1913 to serve as a one-year volunteer with the 2nd Westphalian Field Artillery Regiment 43 in Wesel. During this year of service, World War I broke out, taking Bockamp to the Western and Eastern Fronts. His last rank in the Imperial German Army was lieutenant in the reserve as regimental aide-de-camp in the Reserve Field Artillery Regiment 59. He was awarded the Frontkämpferehrenkreuz as well as the EK I and EK II.

After the war, Bockamp continued his legal training and graduated from the Heidelberg University Faculty of Law. In April 1921, he passed the Große Staatsprüfung (bar exam) and settled in Cologne as a lawyer, first at the Cologne District Court and then at the Higher Regional Court of Cologne (OLG).

=== Political involvement ===
During the Weimar Republic, Bockamp was active in the German People's Party (DVP). He was mentioned in speeches by Gustav Stresemann. In 1926, he became constituency chairman of the DVP for the constituency Cologne-Aachen of the Rhine Province. In the provincial elections in Prussia at the end of 1929, Bockamp won a seat for the DVP and was a member of the Provincial Parliament of the Rhine Province in Düsseldorf from 1930 to 1933.

=== During the Second World War ===
During the Second World War, Bockamp was available for service in the First Lieutenant d.R. (reserve) from 15 May 1940 to 20 June 1943 (on reserve) in the Wehrmacht. He joined the Nazi Party (NSDAP) on 1 May 1933. He was also a member of the National Socialist Association of Legal Professionals and the Reichsluftschutzbund.

== Administrator of the Dutch Crown Assets ==
Two weeks after the Dutch Royal Family fled and the Netherlands surrendered to the Wehrmacht troops, the initial military administration of the occupied Netherlands was replaced by a German civil administration under Reichskommissar Arthur Seyss-Inquart. On 24 June 1940, Seyss-Inquart published a decree on the "confiscation and utilisation of the assets of the living members of the House of Nassau-Oranien" and appointed Baron von Schröder as administrator of the royal assets. For day-to-day business, von Schröder proposed Bockamp, who was experienced in asset management, and obtained his exemption from his short-term position at the Generalkommando in Münster.

Due to the Dutch resistance, including strikes and sabotage, the Reichskommissariat planned, from early 1941, to expropriate the personal property of the royal family. Officially, the decision was only made after Queen Wilhelmina referred to the German armies as "hordes" in a broadcast on Radio Oranje on 31 August 1941. The General Commissioner for Security in the occupied Netherlands, Hanns Albin Rauter, announced the decision to "liquidate the crown assets" due to "irresponsible behaviour towards the occupying power" on 16 September 1941 in the Deutsche Zeitung in den Niederlanden. The decree prompted von Schröder to withdraw, leaving Bockamp responsible for the liquidation, as he took on responsibility for a vast amount of property and numerous court staff. Bockamp's official residence was in the Noordeinde Palace in The Hague.

=== Hesitant implementation ===
Bockamp, like Schröder, disapproved of Hitler's decision, and he tried to prevent a quick liquidation. His intention was to be able to return the crown assets to Queen Wilhelmina after the war. At the beginning of his work in The Hague, Bockamp wrote to his wife Hildegard that he had been entrusted with a delicate task. He operated in a culture in which loyalty to the royal family was paramount. Schröder's communication to the court that Wilhelmina should find her property in the same condition when she returned to the Netherlands as she had left it made Bockamp's actions easier. In a confidential lecture to members of the court in September 1941, Bockamp had indicated that he wanted to proceed with the liquidation of the assets cautiously and in a nuanced manner, and that not everything should be monetised. This allowed him to avoid the members of the court who opposed the confiscation of the crown assets collectively resigning from their posts. He wrote that he had agreed to be appointed liquidator with the stated intention of delaying the case.

=== Inventory ===
Under Bockamp's leadership, an inventory of the House of Oranjes was compiled. Apart from ƒ3 million from bonds and shares in foreign securities portfolios, the Queen's personal assets were estimated at ƒ13 million, of which ƒ9 million were in real estate, ƒ1.5 million in inventory, and ƒ2.5 million in securities. In a letter to his wife, Bockamp described the result as ‘rather disappointing‘, as a much higher amount had been expected. At a dinner on 31 August 1940 at the Hotel "Huis ter Duin", Seyss-Inquart praised the quick result in the presence of Schröder and Bockamp.

Preliminary decisions regarding the balance sheet were made at meetings with the Court Commission and the court's financial officials in July 1940, where Bockamp had confirmed that the crown lands and palaces were not considered private property of the royal family, as they were state property; and therefore did not fall within his jurisdiction. However, the palaces Soestdij and Lange Voorhout, were privately owned by the Oranjes. An inventory was made of the movable property of the palaces Noordeinde, Huis ten Bosch and Amsterdam Palace and listed movable property; items that were privately owned were marked in red, items whose ownership was uncertain were marked in blue, and the rest, which was considered state property, remained uncoloured. The procedure proved impractical because state property and the Queen's property were mixed together. Historian and archivist Flip Maarschalkerweerd opined in 2023, "The sheer size and number of possessions should come as no surprise. After all, it was a princely collection that had been accumulated over centuries."

Some funds, such as the Fonds voor Weduwen en Weezen van het personeel der Koninklijke Hofhoundingen (Fund for Widows and Orphans of Royal Court Personnel), the aristocracy fund and the proceeds from the Nationaal Geschenk (National Gift), which were administered by the treasurer, remained beyond the reach of the German supervisory authority, and were not assessed as property of the House of Oranjes. The horses from Queen Wilhelmina's private collection were initially left untouched. In August 1940, however, four horses were confiscated from the stables at Soestdijk. Wehrmachtbefehlshaber Friedrich Christiansen prevailed that the horses were not under Schröder's administration.

The art collection was of considerable importance. Rumours circulated that Wilhelmina was the richest woman in the world, with a fortune of ƒ120 million, partly due to her art collection. As the most valuable objects in the art collection had not been valued, estimates were made by the director of the Mauritshuis, Professor Wilhelm Martin, for the paintings in Noordeinde Palace, Huis ten Bosch Palace and Amsterdam Palace. The director of the Museum Boijmans, Dirk Hannema, estimated the value of the paintings and antiques in Het Loo Palace. Further inventories, such as those of the silver chamber in Het Loo Palace, were completed by late January 1941.

== Assessment by contemporary witnesses ==
An assessment of Bockamp's activities in the judgement of his contemporaries has been facilitated by the fact that the contemporary witness Elsa M. van der Laaken, daughter of Willem Frederik van der Laaken (1895–1976), Bockamp's Dutch chauffeur and former employee of the royal household, and his German-born wife Anna Helena Elsa Sondermann (1901–1990), published her memoirs in 2002, and above all that the historian and archivist Flip Maarschalkerweerd, who headed the Royal Archives (Koninklijk Huisarchief) and Collections (Koninklijke Verzamelingen) from 2003 to 2019 and was previously State Archivist in Limburg and city archivist of Amersfoort from 2003 to 2019, was able to evaluate the royal archives for the years 1940 to 1948 before they were opened to the public, with the permission of King Willem-Alexander in order to document for the first time in 2023 life at court and the fate of the remaining court staff during the German occupation and the exile of the royal family.

According to Maarschalkerweerd, Bockamp was considered a reserved man during the occupation years in The Hague, who was "cautious in everything he said and did". He was diplomatic, persuasive and flexible, and had a talent for "winning the trust of people on both the German and Dutch sides". van der Laaken wrote similarly in her memoirs: "This quiet man seemed able to maintain a difficult balance between right and wrong in an inhuman situation".

There are no negative comments about him in the available sources, neither on the German nor on the Dutch side. Reich Commissioner Seyss-Inquart was satisfied with his work as administrator, so that he extended Bockamp's mandate after Schröder's abrupt resignation, but now as liquidator. Bockamp's direct superior in the Reichskommissariat Niederlande was General Commissioner Hans Fischböck, who gave him free rein. He maintained professional relationships with colleagues in the Reichskommissariat.

=== Role in the liquidation process ===
When Dutch court employees began to move or hide valuable items belonging to their queen in order to prevent them from being seized or liquidated, Bockamp did not intervene in several instances. As pressure on Bockamp from Berlin increased, he released items for disposal that could easily be replaced later, such as household linen, clothing, wine, forest wood and animals.

The members of the Kommissie Kultureele Waarden (Cultural Values Committee), including Secretary General Jan van Dam and Meinoud Rost van Tonningen, who attempted to select as many goods as possible for acquisition by the Dutch state, encountered no resistance. "The good relationship with the court organisation meant that Bockamp, who was initially perceived as a threat, was ultimately seen as a buffer against German zeal," according to Maarschalkerweerd.

=== Commitment to court employees and others ===
German-friendly court employees could turn to Bockamp, although he made no effort to nazify the court organisation. He successfully freed court employees from detention, saved them from forced labour and provided some with identity cards or vehicles to obtain food during the Hunger winter. "He had seen with his own eyes that persecuted people were hidden in palaces and on royal estates" – hidden in carpet rolls when there was a raid.

van der Laaken describes two specific examples from her own experience of how Bockamp stood up for people in his circle who found themselves in difficult situations. When the German-born wife of his Dutch driver, Anna Helena Elsa Sondermann, wanted to visit her parents in Ibbenbüren at the end of 1941, Bockamp obtained the necessary travel permit for mother and daughter from Höherer SS- und Polizeiführer Rauter in The Hague. When Cornelis van der Sluys, a Dutch architect and father of one of van der Laaken's playmates, was sent to prison (known as the Oranjehotel) after a raid, apparently because he had kept property and valuable items belonging to Jewish friends in his house, Bockamp's driver asked him for help, whereupon Bockamp interceded on behalf of the detainee, who was released after three days.

An intervention by Bockamp on behalf of Joseph van Raalte, a Jewish lawyer who was arrested in Scheveningen in early August 1943 (and later murdered in Auschwitz) and who was the husband of the daughter of Nicolas Japikse, director of the Royal Archives, was unsuccessful.

Bockamp's intervention on behalf of Willem Gerard Röell (1905–1942), the director of Palais Soestdijk and forest manager of Het Loo Palace, was also unsuccessful in the end. Röell's mother was Wilhelmina's favourite lady-in-waiting, and he himself had been a playmate of Princess Juliana and later an employee and confidant of Prince Bernhard. As acting superintendent of Soestdijk, he was subordinate to the administrators of the occupying power and had established a reasonable working relationship with Von Schröder and Bockamp. When Röell was arrested in October 1940 (together with Johan van Suchtelen van de Haare, the intendant of Het Loo) – in retaliation for the internment of all Reichsdeutsche in the Dutch East Indies by the Netherlands – and was to be transported to Buchenwald, Von Schröder and Bockamp were able to secure his release within a few days by declaring him indispensable for the administration of the royal palaces.

In April 1942, however, Röell was arrested again and taken to Scheveningen prison, as the SD accused him of illegal activities. Apparently, in June 1941, he had received an ensign from Arnhem sent by the Dutch intelligence service whose shortwave transmitter needed to be repaired for radio communication with London, and who had later fallen into the hands of German counterintelligence. On 26 June 1942, Röell was brought before the military court in Amsterdam at the Luftgau-Kommando Amsterdam (Air District Command) and sentenced to death on 28 June, after which he was transferred to Kamp Amersfoort. Röell's siblings Binebeth and Eric turned to Bockamp. In order to obtain a reduction in sentence after the death sentence had been passed, Bockamp submitted a defence brief to the assigned field court attorney in which he portrayed Röell as a trustworthy intendant and forest ranger and as a loyal and correct public official towards his German superiors. He also cited mitigating circumstances due to Röell's emotional vulnerability following his abrupt separation from his wife and young daughter, who had fled abroad with Princess Juliana in May 1940, as he had hoped to receive news of his wife and daughter from the "spy from England". He also attempted to downplay the criminality of Röell's offence, as the incriminating incident had taken place before General Christiansen had tightened the crackdown on illegal activities and before Röell had been personally warned by SS and police leader Rauter. This intervention was as unsuccessful as were the diplomatic efforts of the Dutch government and Prince Bernhard. Röell was executed on 29 August at Fort Rhijnauwen near Utrecht.

The court intendant Piet Sickinghe, an electrical engineer and son of Wilhelmina's first chamberlain Agathon Sickinghe, who was responsible for the palaces Huis ten Bosch, Noordeinde and Amsterdam, testified after the end of the war: "He [Bockamp] also did a lot for the staff, for example, during the Hunger winter of 1944/45, he helped to forge identity cards to keep people out of forced labour."

== Post-war period: denazification in the British zone ==
Bockamp, like all other lawyers in the post-war British occupation zone in Germany, was subject to a denazification process in order to determine if he was eligible for reinstatement. He was required to complete a questionnaire, with supporting documents from third parties. Bockamp attached "examples of my activities on behalf of Dutch citizens" to his questionnaire and included a list of names about farm workers or their relatives whom he had helped, and a number of Dutch private individuals.

Bockamp had only joined the Nazi Party after Hitler's appointment as Reich Chancellor, and this was not held against him in the assessment as one of the many "pragmatists". Maarschalkerweerd opined that: "What he could perhaps have been criticised for was the fact that he accepted the appointment as liquidator of the Dutch royal family's estates." It is unclear whether he could have afforded to refuse this appointment, as Schröder had been able to do. According to Maarschalkerweerd, "…with this appointment he had become a cog in the wheel of the planned expropriation and sale of the royal property." After the war, Bockamp stated that "he had fulfilled his position as liquidator in such a way that the liquidation had hardly amounted to anything, while he had actively looked after the interests of the court staff." With an exonerating statement from the three members of the Court Commission, Willem J. van Lynden, Willem Maurits de Brauw and W.C. Snouckaert van Schauburg, "that many valuable assets had been preserved for the Royal House," Bockamp was able to obtain permission to resume his work as a lawyer in the Cologne administrative district after the war. He was re-admitted to the Cologne District Court as a solicitor and, four years later, to the Cologne Higher Regional Court.

He had to rebuild his practice premises and his home, which had been destroyed by allied aerial bombing of Cologne. His wife died in early 1948. His son Werner later joined the law firm. He was also involved as chairman of the Alemannenkreis Köln (Cologne Alemannic Circle).
