= RLB-Präsident =

Nazi paramilitary rank

President of the Reichsluftschutzbund
- Reichsluftschutzbund Präsident
- Rank of the president

- Flag for the president

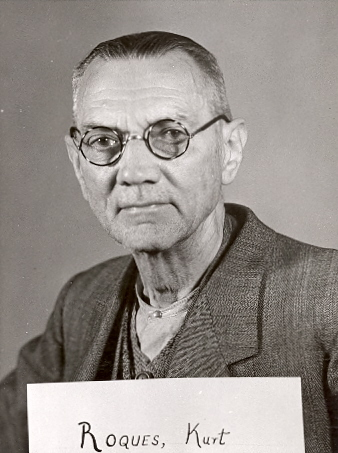
- Longest sitting Karl von Roques; 30 April 1936 – 30 May 1939
- Reichsluftschutzbund
- Member of: Ministry of Aviation
- Formation: 29 April 1933
- First holder: Hugo Grimme
- Final holder: Friedrich Hirschhauer
- Abolished: 1945

RLB-Präsident, also known as Reichsluftschutzbund Präsident or Präsident der RLB, was a Nazi paramilitary rank which was held by the supreme commander of the Reichsluftschutzbund. The position of RLB-Präsident was the highest rank of the Reichsluftschutzbund and was also considered a senior ministerial position within the Aviation Ministry of the Nazi Germany government.

The insignia for RLB-Präsident consisted of a white gold trimmed collar patch with three embroidered eagles. A thick gold shoulder board was also worn.

== RLB-Präsident ==
No.	Portrait	RLB-Präsident	Took office	Left office	Time in office	Ref.
1	Hugo Grimme [de]	Generalleutnant; Hugo Grimme (1872–1943)	29 April 1933	30 April 1936	3 years, 1 day	.
2	Karl von Roques	Generalleutnant; Karl von Roques (1880–1949)	30 April 1936	30 May 1939	3 years, 30 days	.
3	Ludwig von Schröder	General der Flakartillerie; Ludwig von Schröder (1884–1941)	30 May 1939	3 June 1941	2 years, 4 days	.
-	Hermann Sautier	General-Hauptluftschutzführer; Hermann Sautier; Acting (as Chief of Staff)	12 June 1941	1 August 1942	1 year, 50 days	
4	Friedrich Hirschhauer [de]	General der Flakartillerie; Friedrich Hirschhauer (1883–1979)	1 August 1942	31 January 1945	2 years, 183 days	.
