= Ranks and insignia of the Reichsluftschutzbund =

Ranking system in the Reichsluftschutzbund

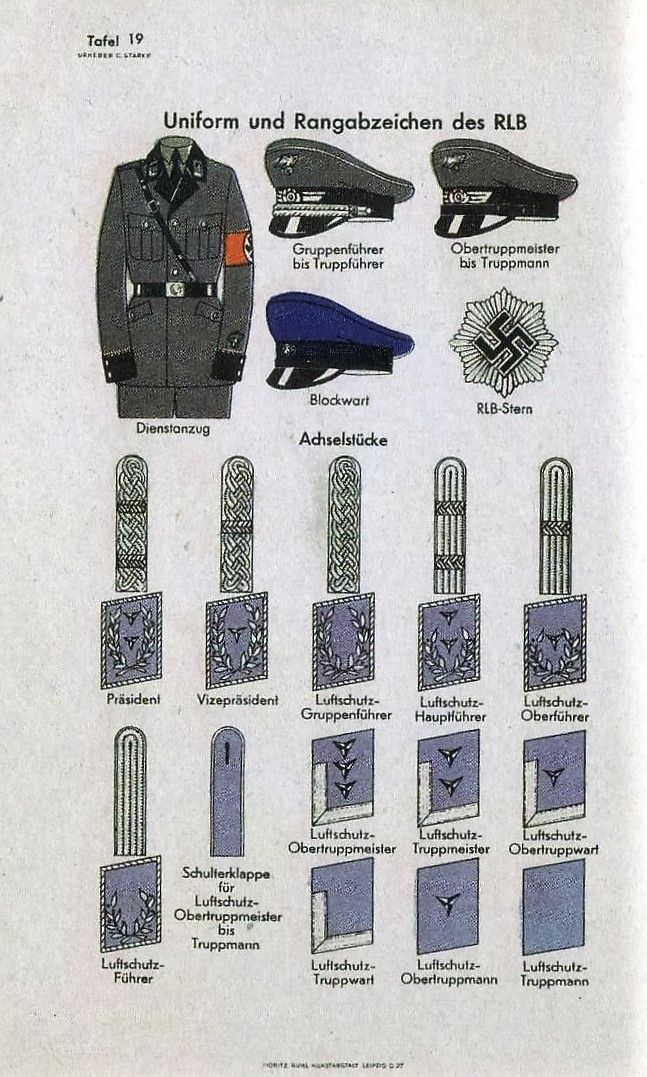
Service uniform and insignia of the Reichsluftschutzbund (RLB), the 'National Air Raid Protection League' in Nazi Germany, 1937 Illustration: Deutsche Uniformen (Verlag Moritz Ruhl, Leipzig)

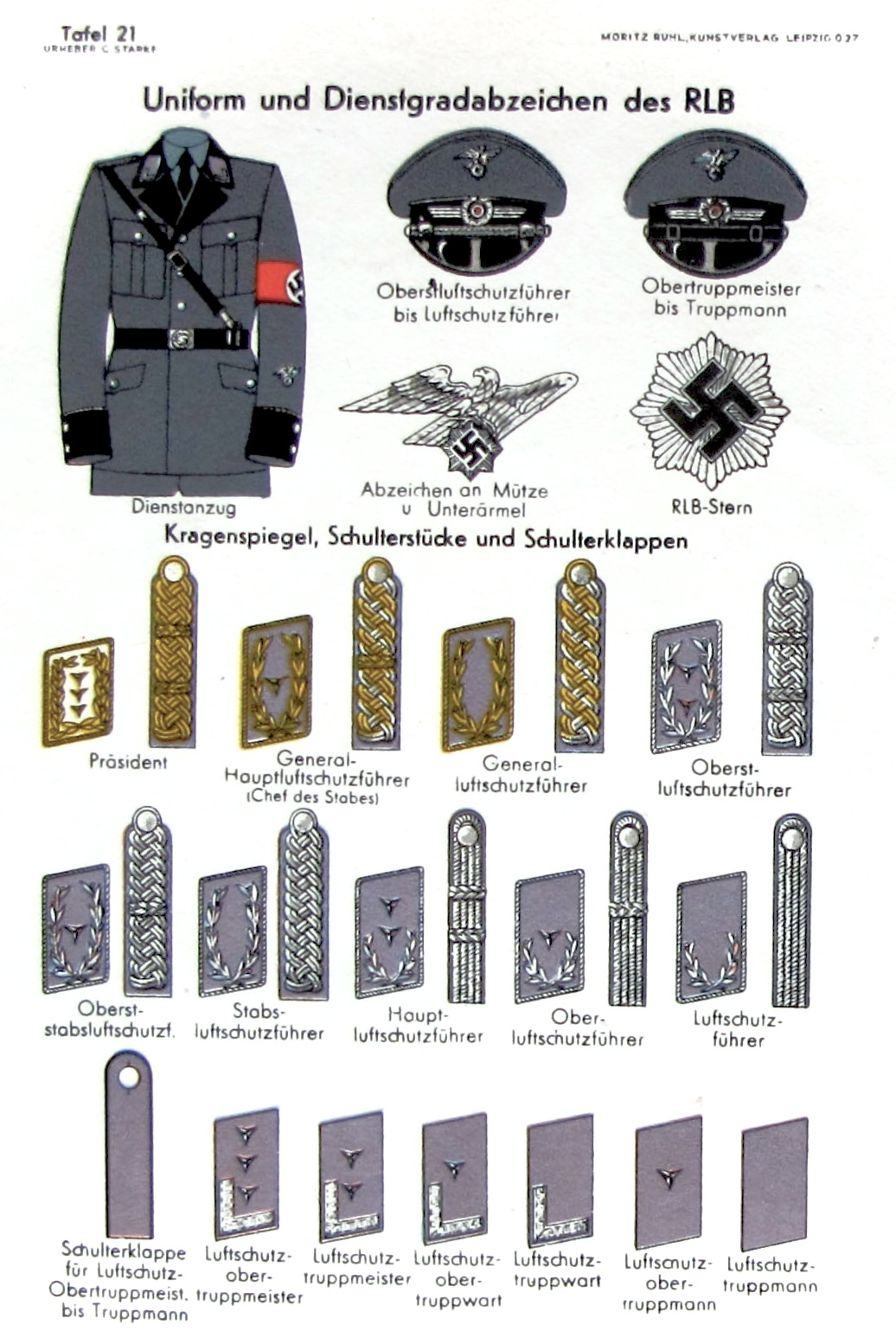
RLB insignia, 1939 Illustration: Deutsche Uniformen (later edition)

Uniforms and insignia of the Reichsluftschutzbund were paramilitary titles adopted by the Reichsluftschutzbund (transl. State Air Protection Corps – RLB) for wear on paramilitary uniforms of the RLB.

== Uniforms ==
Much like the uniforms of the SA and the SS, the RLB maintained its own elaborate system of uniforms and ranks. While most often a field uniform was worn, that had little accoutrements beyond rank, a shoulder band with RLB insignia, a helmet with RLB identification on it and occasionally a gorget; a service coat did exist, which was modeled off of the standard Nazi Party paramilitary dress. The Nazi armband was worn on the service coat, but was absent on the field uniform, where it was replaced by the RLB armband. A badge that had the initials of the Reichsluftschutzbund on it also existed, and was worn by members both in and out of uniform.

Women could also volunteer for the RLB, and were permitted to wear the field uniform, but without rank.

== Table of ranks ==
Collar insignia	Shoulder insignia	RLB rank	Translation	Luftwaffe equivalent
		Reichsluftschutzbund-Präsident	Reichsluftschutzbund president	General der Flieger
		General-Hauptluftschutzführer	General head air protection leader	Generalleutnant
		Generalluftschutzführer	General air protection leader	Generalmajor
		Oberstluftschutzführer	Chief air protection leader	Oberst
		Oberststabsluftschutzführer	Chief staff air protection leader	Oberstleutnant
		Stabsluftschutzführer	Staff air protection leader	Major
		Hauptluftschutzführer	Head air protection leader	Hauptmann
		Oberluftschutzführer	Senior air protection leader	Oberleutnant
		Luftschutzführer	Air protection leader	Leutnant
		Luftschutzobertruppmeister	Senior master air protection trooper	Feldwebel
		Luftschutztruppmeister	Master air protection trooper	Unteroffizier
		Luftschutzobertruppwart	Senior air protection trooper warden	Hauptgefreiter
		Luftschutztruppwart	Air protection trooper warden	Obergefreiter
		Luftschutzobertruppmann	Senior air protection trooper	Gefreiter
		Luftschutztruppmann	Air protection trooper	Flieger
