= Steen Lichtenberg =

Steen Lichtenberg (1930-2019) is a Danish engineer, Emeritus Professor of Project and Construction Management at the Technical University of Denmark, author and management consultant. He is known from his 1978 textbook on new project management, which a standard reference work in Scandinavia. He is also known as former president of the International Project Management Association.

== Biography ==
Lichtenberg obtained his MSc Eng from the Technical University of Denmark, and his in 1974 his PhD with a thesis on new project management principles.

After his graduation Lichtenberg started his academic career at the Technical University of Denmark, where he eventually was appointed Professor of Project Management and Systems Engineering at its Construction Management Department. He was also a frequent visiting professor in Scandinavia and beyond. After his retirement early in the new millennium he continued to work as management consultant.

Lichtenberg participated in several Scandinavian societies for Project Management, and was one of the first members of North American Project Management Institute (PMI). In 1982 he was elected president of the International Project Management Association as successor of Roland Gutsch, and was succeeded by Eric Gabriel in 1985. In 1986 Lichtenberg the Danish Brewery Association awarded him the distinguished gold medal, and in 1993 he was made honorary member of the International Project Management Association.

== Work ==
=== The Lichtenberg Technique ===
In his book Project management Tonnquist (2009) summarized the successive principle method by Steen Lichtenberg:

"The Danish professor Steen Lichtenberg has defined a method which takes all this into consideration. This method is also called the successive principle.
The method involves placing uncertainties on all labor and cost estimations, on top of an estimation of the probable value. Minimum and maximum values indicate the range of uncertainty, also called the uncertainty analysis. The probability that the mean value falls outside of the range min and max must not be more than one percent.
The time schedule estimation is based on assumptions, official or unofficial, e.g. on who will carry out a task, how the weather is or access to resources. The uncertainty is further dealt with in the parts which are most significant for the project's total uncertainty.
Since there are many unknown factors in a project the range between min and max will be significant. The project's completion date and total costs will not be a mean value, but a probability assessment..."

=== Reception ===
According to Per Svejvig (2013) Steen Lichtenberg played a pioneering role in the rethinking of project management in Denmark. He stated, that:

"Steen Lichtenberg, who back in 1983 wrote about the Scandinavian alternative to the “only one concept of good project management” (Lichtenberg, 1983). Lichtenberg has had a great influence on the Danish project management community with his proactive management of uncertainty using the successive principle (Lichtenberg, 2000), which has augmented the technocratic rational view..."

== Selected publications ==
- Steen. Lichtenberg. Project planning: a third generation approach: on some procedures for balanced timing and resource planning of construction projects. Polyteknisk Forlag, 1974.
- Lichtenberg, Steen. Projekt planlægning-i en foranderlig verden. 1978.
- Lichtenberg, Steen. Proactive management of uncertainty using the successive principle: a practical way to manage opportunities and risks. Polyteknisk Press, 2000.
- Lichtenberg, Steen. Proaktiv ledelse af usikkerhed ved hjælp af successiv princippet: en praktisk måde at håndtere muligheder og usikkerheder på. COMPILOT.dk | E-bog: Molio.dk, 2023. Translation: Henrik K . Søndergaard. The edition include two new chapters about: Reference Class Forecast & "Tandem analysis"(Tandemsanalyser).

Articles, a selection

- Lichtenberg, Steen. "The successive principle." Proceedings of the PMI International Symposium, Project Management Institute, Washington, DC, USA. 1974.
- Lichtenberg, Steen. "New project management principles for the conception stage: outline of a new ‘generation’." International Journal of Project Management 7.1 (1989): 46-51.
- Archibald, Russell D., and Steen Lichtenberg. "Experiences using next generation management practices. The future has already begun." keynote paper, Proceedings IPMA* 1992 World Congress, Florens, Italy. 1992.
- Sunde, Leif, and Steen Lichtenberg. "Net-present-value cost/time tradeoff." International Journal of Project Management 13.1 (1995): 45-49.
