= Arnold Kaufmann =

French engineer (1911–1994)

Arnold Kaufmann (18 August 1911 – 15 June 1994) was a French engineer, professor of Applied Mechanics and Operations Research at the Mines ParisTech in Paris, at the Grenoble Institute of Technology and the Université catholique de Louvain, and scientific advisor at Groupe Bull. He is known for writing the first book on fuzzy sets, and as cofounder of the International Project Management Association.

== Life and work ==
Kaufmann had an illustrious career. He served as a pilot during World War II, and in his later life became a professor of Applied Mechanics and Operations Research at the Ecole Supérieure des Mines de Paris; Polytechnic University at Grenoble; and the University of Louvain in Belgium.

In 1964–65 Kaufmann participated in meetings with Roland Gutsch from Germany, Pierre Koch and Yves Eugene from France, and Dick Vullinghs from the Netherlands, which led to the founding of the International Project Management Association. In the discussion about how to name the new association, Kaufmann suggested the term INTERNET for INTERnational NETwork. After the Vienna congress of the association in 1967, INTERNET became the official association name of the conference held every second year.

In a memoriam of Professor Arnold Kaufmann Lotfi A. Zadeh (1996) wrote:

"In writing about Professor Kaufmann, I find it hard to find adequate words to describe my admiration and affection for a man who stood so tall in all respects. A truly outstanding intellect, professor Kaufmann was totally dedicated to his calling as a scientist, writer and educator. Material wealth, status and prestige were far removed from his goals in life. He was an avid conversationalist on issues related to science and especially fuzzy set theory. Somehow, the concept of a fuzzy set struck a resonant note in his thinking. When I met him in 1970, the enthusiasm of a man of his age made a deep impression on me. I felt very small by comparison."

== Selected publications ==
- Kaufmann, Arnold and R. Cruon. La programmation dynamique: gestion scientifique séquentielle. Dunod, 1965.
- Kaufmann, Arnold, Introduction À la Combinatorique en Vue Des Applications, Par A. Kaufmann. Pref. de C. Berge. 1968
- Kaufmann, Arnold. Confiance technique : théorie mathématique de la fiabilité. Dunod, 1969
- Kaufmann, Arnold and Jacques Pezé. Des Sous-hommes et des super-machines. Paris : A. Michel, 1970.
- Kaufmann, Arnold. Introduction to the theory of fuzzy subsets. Vol. 2. Academic Pr, 1975.
- Kaufmann, Arnold. "Introduction à la théorie des sous-ensembles flous à l'usage des ingénieurs. Tome III, Applications à la classification et à la reconnaissance des formes, aux automates et aux systèmes, aux choix des critères." (1975).
- Kaufmann, Arnold and Robert Faure. Invitation à la recherche opérationnelle. Dunod Entreprise, Méthodes et Techniques de Gestion, 1982.
- Kaufmann, Arnold, and Madan M. Gupta. Fuzzy mathematical models in engineering and management science. Elsevier Science Inc., 1988.
