= Olof Hörberg =

Swedish engineer (1921–1988)

Olof Hörberg (13 June 1921 – 23 Nov 1988) was a Swedish engineer from Stockholm, known as co-founder of the International Project Management Association, and its first president from 1972 to 1976.

Hörberg had obtained his MSc in engineering from the Royal Institute of Technology, and had published a manual on FM radio technology in the 1964. In cooperation with the European International Management Systems Association/INTERNET, in 1968, Hörberg initiated and founded the Network Planning Association in Sweden, nowadays the Svenskt Projektforum.

In 1972 he became the first president of the European umbrella organization, the European International Management Systems Association/INTERNET, later the International Project Management Association. In 1976 he was succeeded by Roland Gutsch

== Selected publications ==
- Olof Hörberg. FM-teknik radioteknikerns handbok. Bok, 1964

Articles, a selection

- Olof Hörberg. "Stril 60," in: Teknisk Tidskrift, Vol 92. 1962. p. 929.
