= Eric Gabriel =

British mechanical engineer

Eric Gabriel (2 April 1927 – 2015) was a British mechanical engineer in the construction industry and 4th president of the International Project Management Association, known for his contribution to the development and professionalism of project management.

== Biography ==
Gabriel was born in Leeds in 1927, the son of Louis Gabriel, a tailor, and Fanny (Stone) Gabriel. After attending the Cockburn School, he obtained his Bsc in mechanical engineering in 1947 at the University of Leeds.

After his graduation Gabriel served at the Royal Electrical and Mechanical Engineers, and afterwards started his career in the construction industry. From 1947 to 1957 he was resident engineer at Babcock & Wilcox and participated in the construction of conventional power stations. From 1957 to 1969 he was chief commissioning engineer for The Nuclear Power Group at Knutsford, England, and contributed to the construction of two of Britain's first nuclear power stations: the Berkeley nuclear power station and the Dungeness Nuclear Power Station. In those days Gabriel was chief commissioning engineer for the Nuclear Power Group (TNPG).

In the 1978 he moved to Foster Wheeler, where he became cost and planning manager. In 1972 he had been co-founder of the Association for Project Management and became its chairman from 1982 to 1986. From 1985 to 1988 he also served as president of the International Project Management Association as successor of the Danish Steen Lichtenberg, and was succeeded by the German Roland Gutsch. In the late 1980s and early 1990s he was project manager at the construction of the Sainsbury Wing at the National Gallery, and at the rebuilding of the opera house at Glyndebourne.

Gabriel was among others awarded the Freedom of the City of London, and a Fellow of the Royal Society of Arts.

== Selected publications ==
- Eric Gabriel. "Access and the project manager." International Journal of Project Management, Volume 3, Issue 4, November 1985
- Gabriel, Eric. "The lean approach to project management." International Journal of Project Management 15.4 (1997): 205–209.
- Gabriel, Eric. "The cultural dimensions of project management," in: Hasso Reschke & Heinz Schelle. Dimensions of Project Management: Fundamentals, Techniques, Organization. Applications. 1990. p. 79–84
