= Rodney Turner =

British/New Zealand organizational theorist (born 1953)

John Rodney Turner (born 21 January 1953 (age 72)) is a British/New Zealand organizational theorist and Professor of Project Management at Skema Business School since 2004 and at the Kingston Business School since 2013. He is known for his work of project management.

== Biography ==
Turner obtained his B.Eng from the University of Auckland in 1973, his DPhil in Engineering Science and MSc in mathematics from in Worcester College, Oxford in 1977, and another Msc from Brasenose College, Oxford in 1979.

Turner started his academic career as IBM Post-doctoral Research Fellow in 1977 at Oxford University in its Department of Engineering Science and at Brasenose College. After his graduation in 1979 he moved into industry, starting as mechanical engineer at Imperial Chemical Industries. The next six years he worked in management positions in process development, project management, machine design, construction and maintenance. In 1985 he moved into consultancy branch and was management consultant for Coopers & Lybrand Associates in the fields of manufacturing and project management. There for three years he worked in the areas of shipbuilding, manufacturing, telecommunications, computing, finance, and government.

In 1989 he moved back to the academic world to the Henley Business School at the University of Reading as Director of Project Management, appointed Professor in 1994. In 1997 he moved to the Erasmus University Rotterdam, where he served as Professor of Project Management until 2005. In those days he was also Operations Director in the process plant industry at the European Construction Institute. Since 2004 he is Professor of Project Management at the Skema Business School. From 2005 to 2009 he was also Professor of Project Management at Kemmy Business School at the University of Limerick, at since 2013 Professor of Project Management at the Kingston Business School.

Rodney served as chairman of the Association for Project Management, and as chairman of the International Project Management Association from 1998-2000.

Turners research areas cover "project management in small to medium-enterprises, the management of complex projects, the governance of project management, including ethics and trust, project leadership and Human Resource Management in the project-oriented firm."

== Selected publications ==
- Turner, John Rodney. The handbook of project-based management: improving the processes for achieving strategic objectives. McGraw-Hill, 1993.
- Turner, J. Rodney. Handbook of project-based management. McGraw-Hill Professional Publishing, 2008.

Articles, a selection

- Turner, J. Rodney, and Robert A. Cochrane. "Goals-and-methods matrix: coping with projects with ill defined goals and/or methods of achieving them." International Journal of project management 11.2 (1993): 93-102.
- Turner, J. Rodney, and Ralf Müller. "On the nature of the project as a temporary organization." International journal of project management 21.1 (2003): 1-8.
- Turner, John Rodney, and Ralf Müller. "The project manager's leadership style as a success factor on projects: A literature review." Project Management Institute, 2005.
