= Pierre Koch =

French civil engineer (1895–1978)

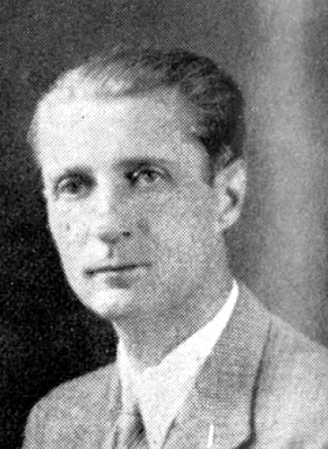
- Pierre Koch, early 20th c.
- Born: 18 September 1895; Saverne
- Died: 14 February 1978 (aged 82); Paris
- Education: École des ponts ParisTech
- Engineering career
- Discipline: Civil engineering
- Institutions: Director of Water and Sanitation in Paris; Professor of Hydrology at the École des ponts ParisTech
- Awards: Commander of the Légion d'honneur

Pierre Koch (18 September 1895 – 14 February 1978) was a French civil engineer, director of Water and Sanitation in Paris, and Professor of Hydrology at the École des ponts ParisTech. He is known for his work as a hydraulic engineer, and as co-founder of the International Project Management Association.

== Biography ==
Born in Saverne in 1895, Koch entered the École Polytechnique in 1914. After participating in World War I, he continued his studies after the war at the Ecole des Ponts et Chaussées, now École des ponts ParisTech, where he obtained his engineering degree. He later also obtained his Doctor of Law.

Koch started his civil engineering career at the Corps at the port of Bordeaux, where he was appointed from 1923 to 1927. He was later stationed at the City of Paris, where he made it director of Water and Sanitation in Paris and inspector general of the Corps. In 1950 he was also appointed Professor of Hydrology at the École des ponts ParisTech, where he taught until his retirement in the 1960s. Afterwards, he remained active among others as members of the Supreme Council of Public Health, officer of the Chamber of Commerce and Industry in Paris (CCIP), and member of the INTERNET Board.

In 1952 Koch was awarded Commander of the Légion d'honneur. In 1987 the International Association on Water Pollution Research and Control (IAWPRC) initiated the Karl Imhoff-Pierre Koch Medal, in honour of two of their foremost honorary members. Koch died in Paris, 14 February 1978.

== Work ==
=== Water supply and wastewater disposal ===
Koch's main work was in the field of Water supply and wastewater disposal. Hager (2014) summarized:

"Koch was responsible for both the water supply and the wastewater disposal of the Seine Department, including the French capital. His 1937 book on the sanitation of agglomerations saw various re-editions, as also his second book Sewer networks, first published in 1954. Besides, Koch also translated the city sanitation book of Karl Imhoff (1876–1965) into French. He further contributed various papers to sewer hydraulics."

=== International Management Systems Association ===
In 1964-65 Koch participated in a meeting with several other European engineers to discuss new tools, such as the critical path method. Among the participants were Arnold Kaufmann and Yves Eugene, who chaired the meeting, both also from France, Dick Vullinghs from The Netherlands, and Roland Gutsch from Germany. This meeting initiated the formation of the International Project Management Association, which started under the name International Management Systems Association and worked under the name INTERNET for INTERnational NETwork. Koch served on the INTERNET board for many years.

In 1967 Koch co-managed the first INTERNET Congress in Vienna, and edited the proceedings of the first congress. In 1974 Koch participated in the organization of the 4th Internet World Congresses in Paris. In the last year of his life he had also participated in the organization of the 6th INTERNET congress in Garmisch-Partenkirchen, which was held the next year in 1979.

== Selected publications ==
- Pierre Koch. Les réseaux d'égouts: données d'établissement et de calcul. Dunod, 1954
- Pierre Koch. Cours d'Hydrologie (1955-1956 ) : Livre premier, Données générales sur l'hydrologie; Livre deuxième, Grands domaines d'application. Edité par Ecole Nationale des Ponts et Chaussées, 1955.
- G. Vanneufville, P. Clairgeon and P. Koch. La Direction générale des services techniques de Paris. Paris : Editions Science et industrie, 1958.
- Pierre Koch. Les services d'assainissement. 1964
- Pierre Koch & others (ed). Congres INTERNET I, Vienna, 1967. Methodes a chemin critique. Network methods. Actes du Congres Internet I, Vienne, 1967. Paris, Dunod.
