= Roland Gutsch =

German engineer (1925–2009)

Roland W. Gutsch (3 November 1925 - 20 February 2009) was a German engineer at the German aircraft manufacturer Dornier, known as co-founder and President of the International Project Management Association, and the GMP Deutsche Gesellschaft für Projektmanagement e.V.

== Life and work ==
Gutsch was born in 1925 in Karlsruhe, as son of a physician. His education was interrupted by World War II, in which he had to take part and suffered wounds on multiple occasions. After the ending of the war obtained a degree in business administration.

Gutsch started his career in industry in 1950 in the time of the reconstruction of Germany. He eventually was employed as engineer at Dornier at Lake Constance, where he spend the rest of his career. With Pierre Koch, Yves Eugene, Dick Vullinghs, Arnold Kaufmann and others in 1965 he co-founded INTERNET, a platform for project management, today's IPMA International Project Management Association. In 1979 he was the initiator and co-founder of the GMP Deutsche Gesellschaft für Projektmanagement e.V. (GPM). He was, among others, President of the 6th International World Congress for Project Management in Garmisch-Partenkirchen. He served as President of the International Project Management Association first from 1976 to 1979 as successor of Olof Hörberg, and from 1979 to 1982. After the Danish Steen Lichtenberg and British Eric Gabriel, he served a third time from 1988 to 1991.

For his involvement in project management, he was awarded the Order of Merit of the Federal Republic of Germany in 1991. He was honorary chairman of the GPM, who initiated an award is his name, the Roland Gutsch Project Management Award.

== Reception ==
Reinhard Wagner, in an appreciation of Roland Gutsch, described the role of Gutsch as engineer in the emerging field of project management as follows:

"Roland W. Gutsch was a German engineer who very early dived into the at that time miraculous world of computing. When he entered DORNIER (at that time a famous German aerospace company, now part of Airbus) he was immediately confronted with Project Management and what support computers could offer for planning and control of complex aerospace projects. He developed at that time famous PPS (Project Planning and Control System) based on network technology (PERT, CPM) and which was then used in the German industry. With his widened view on how to manage projects he substantially contributed to the development of the modern Project Management concept as we know it nowadays..."

In 2013 Reschke and Schelle dedicated their book "Dimensions of project management: fundamentals, techniques, organization, applications" to Roland Gutsch. They stated:

"Roland W. Gutsch nurtured the project management idea like a living plant from the time it was identified only with network technique and aerospace and military uses to the point where it was recognized as an internationally used management discipline. INTERNET, as an international organisation of national project management groups realized under his leadership international congresses for project management, seminars for specialists, exchange of expert knowledge and technical technical literature. It was always important for Roland W. Gutsch to bring together people from various branches, various projects and various cultures. His concern was to emphasize the common interest without suppressing the individual."

== Selected publications ==
- Gutsch, Roland W. Entscheidungshilfe durch Systemtechnik. 1972.
- Dworatschek, Sebastian, and Roland Gutsch. "Wandel der Themenschwerpunkte der internationalen Konferenzen von INTERNET und PMI (USA)." (1987): 23-33.
- Gutsch, Roland W., Hasso Reschke, and Heinz Schelle. Proceedings of the 6th Internet Congress 1979. Vol. 2. VDI-Verlag, 1979.
- Gutsch, Roland W. Dimensions of project management: fundamentals, techniques, organization, applications; publication in honour of Roland W. Gutsch. Springer, 1990.
- Dworatschek, Sebastian, and Roland Gutsch. "A Multi-Media Training in Project Management Draft for a German-Russian Joint Venture TV-Project." Proceedings of the 11th INTERNET World Congress in Florence, Milano. 1992.
- Gutsch, Roland W. "Ein Beitrag über die Entwicklung und Gestaltung des Projektmanagements." Innovative Managementaufgaben in der nationalen und internationalen Praxis. Deutscher Universitätsverlag, 2001. 23-27.
