= Yves Eugene =

French engineer and oil executive

Yves Eugene was a French engineer and manager at the French oil company Société nationale des pétroles d’Aquitaine (SNPA), later Elf Aquitaine. He is known as co-founder of the International Project Management Association.

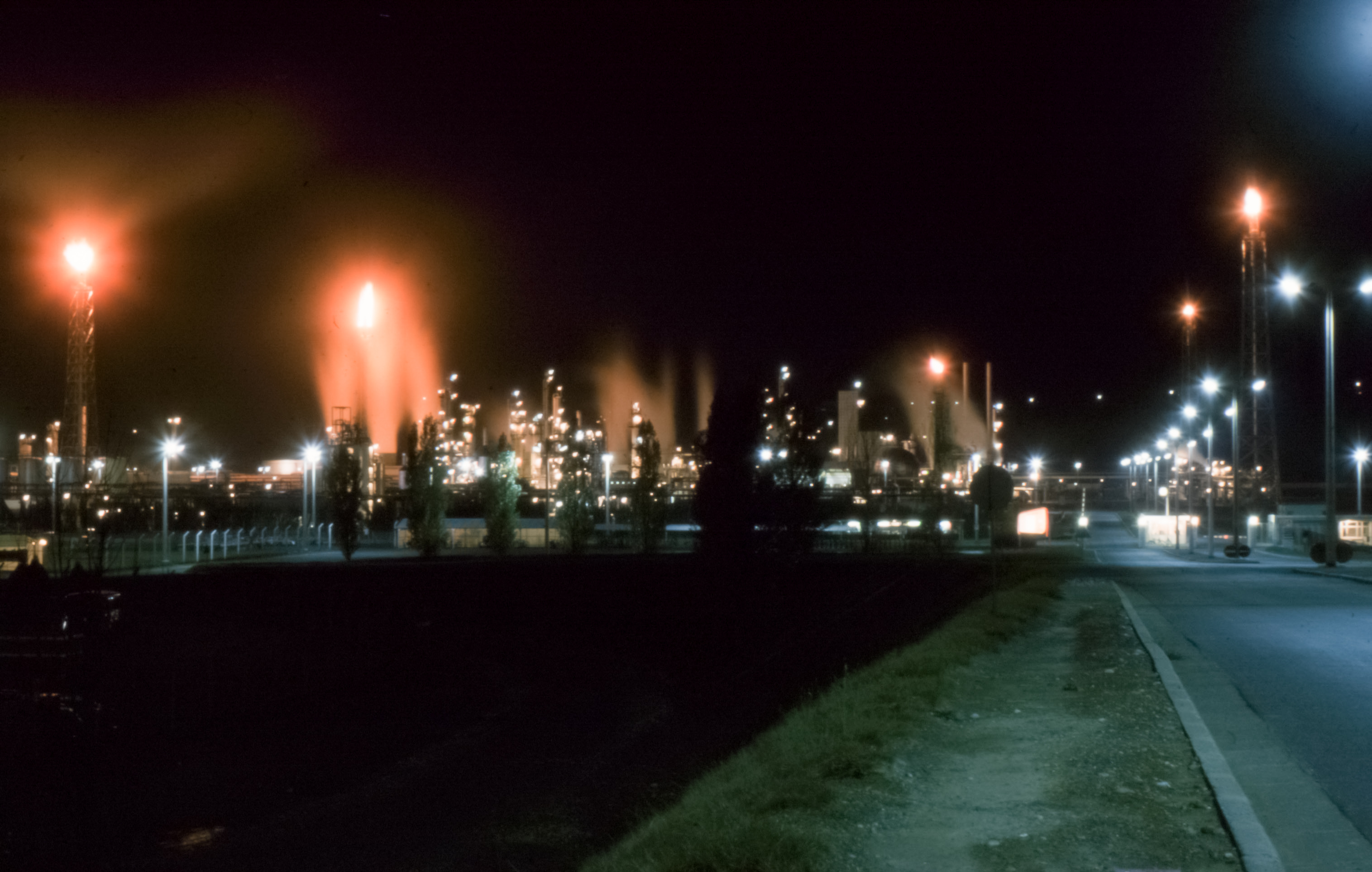
Lacq natural gas refinery in 1964.

In 1960 Eugene was head of the Operations Research Section at the French oil company Société nationale des pétroles d’Aquitaine (SNPA), later Elf Aquitaine. In 1962 his company introduced the use of Critical Path Method in the major overhauls of the Lacq natural gas refinery. They also started using this method for new construction, and the determination of annual budgets.

In those days Eugene also served in the Association Française d´Informatique et de Recherche Opérationnelle (AFIRO). In this context in 1964 he chaired a first informal meeting of a European aircraft project about the Critical Path Method (CPM) as a management approach. In this meeting with Pierre Koch of France, Dick Vullinghs from The Netherlands, and Roland Gutsch and Arnold Kaufmann from Germany plans were made to start an international cooperation. This led to the founding of the International Project Management Association the next year.

== Selected publications ==
- Yves Eugene. "Mark IV" in: Willy Londner, Alain Bordat (ed.). réalisations, perspectives; compte rendu des troisièmes Journées internationales de l'informatique et de l'automatisme (Paris, juin 1970). Entreprise moderne d'édition, 1971. p. 173-177
