= International Journal of Project Management =

- Discipline: Project management
- Language: English
- Edited by: Martina Huemann

Publication details
- History: 1983–present
- Publisher: Elsevier
- Frequency: 8/year
- Open access: Hybrid
- Impact factor: 7.4 (2023)

Standard abbreviations
- ISO 4: Int. J. Proj. Manag.

Indexing
- ISSN: 0263-7863 (print); 1873-4634 (web)
- LCCN: 88647684

Links
- Journal homepage

The International Journal of Project Management is a peer-reviewed academic journal covering research in the field of project management and organization studies. It is published by Elsevier in collaboration with the Association for Project Management and the International Project Management Association.

== Abstracting and indexing ==
The journal is abstracted and indexed in:

- Current Contents/Social and Behavioral Sciences
- EBSCO databases
- International Bibliography of the Social Sciences
- LexisNexis
- PAIS International
- PsycINFO
- Scopus
- Social Sciences Citation Index
- VINITI Database RAS

According to the Journal Citation Reports, the journal has a 2023 impact factor of 7.4.
