= Dick Vullinghs =

Dutch aerospace engineer (born c.1936)

H. M. "Dick" Vullinghs (born ca. 1936 in 's-Hertogenbosch) is a Dutch aerospace engineer, who worked at Fokker. He is known as co-founder of the International Project Management Association.

Vullinghs was born and raised in 's-Hertogenbosch. He studied aerospace engineering at the Delft University of Technology, where he obtained his propedeuse-degree in 1956, and some years later his engineer's degree. Vullinghs spend most of his career at the Dutch aircraft manufacturer Fokker. At Fokker he was among the first to experiment with the use of early project management techniques. In 1987 Vullinghs had left Fokker and was directeur of the Coöperatieve Inkoopvereniging COOPRA in Rotterdam.

In 1964-65 Vullings co-founded the International Project Management Association with Roland Gutsch and Arnold Kaufmann from Germany, and Yves Eugene and Pierre Koch from France. He also played a leading role in the start-up of the INTERNET Congresses of the new association.

== Selected publications ==
- H.M. Vullinghs. "Netwerkplanning in de praktijk," Informatie, nr. 42 (1965)
- Derksen, H. G. Introduction to project planning by network analysis. No. 1. Stadhouderskade 6, 1967.
- Koens, H. J., T. P. M. Hendriks, and H. M. Vullinghs. "Balgengasmeters." Notes 107.8 (1987): 334-347.
