= Association for Project Management =

Professional body for project management

The Association for Project Management
- Type: Professional organization
- Founded: 1972
- Headquarters: Regent Park, Summerleys Road, Princes Risborough, Buckinghamshire, United Kingdom
- Key people: Dr Yvonne Thompson CBE DL, president; Adam Boddison, CEO
- Revenue: 12,522,886 pound sterling (2020)
- Members: Over 42,000 members and more than 470 corporate partners
- Number of employees: 138 (2024)
- Website: https://www.apm.org.uk

The Association for Project Management is a British professional organisation for project and programme management. It received a Royal Charter in 2017, and is a registered charity. It has over 42,000 individual and more than 470 corporate members, and is the largest professional body of its kind in the United Kingdom. The head office is in Princes Risborough in Buckinghamshire.

== History ==
The association was founded in 1972 as the UK branch of INTERNET, now the International Project Management Association. Weaver (2007) recalled, that:

"The UK branch of INTERNET (now the APM), was originated by the ‘pioneering seven’ whose meeting at an INTERNET (later IPMA) expert seminar in Zurich in 1971 inspired them to start a UK branch, which held its first meeting in London in May 1972. The first executive meeting on INTERNET(UK) was held in the lobby of the Sheraton Hotel, Stockholm on 13 May 1972 during the 3rd annual world congress of INTERNET. Jack Grimshaw was the original chairman, others in the founding group included Dr Jim Gordon and Dennis Gower. Annual membership fees were set at £1, and within a month membership had reached 78 (PMI at the time were charging £7).

With the emergence of the Internet in the 1990s, the global project management association INTERNET was renamed International Project Management Association (IPMA) and the UK Branch Association for Project Management (APM).

International Journal of Project Management is published in collaboration with the Association for Project Management (APM) and the International Project Management Association (IPMA). The Journal was formerly co-owned by APM and Elsevier, but in an act of significant system generosity, APM gifted half of its shares to IPMA to support it with long-term revenue generation. The Association for Project Management was formerly the certification body in the United Kingdom for the IPMA. However, from 1 March 2025, APM has operated independently alongside the IPMA, rather than as a Member Association and certification body.

It received its Royal Charter on 6 January 2017.

=== Presidents ===
- 1972 - 1978 : Geoffrey Trimble
- 1978 - 1984 : David Firnberg
- 1984 - 1991 : Monty Finniston
- 1991 - 2000 : Sir Bob Reid
- 2000 - 2004 : Tony Ridley
- 2004 - 2010 : Martin Barnes
- 2012 - 2015 : Tom Taylor
- 2015 - 2019 : David Waboso
- 2019 - 2024: Sue Kershaw
- 2024 - : Dr Yvonne Thompson CBE DL

=== Chair of Trustees ===
- 1972 - 1977 : Jack Grimshaw
- 1977 - 1979 : Herbert Walton
- 1982 - 1986 : Eric Gabriel
- 1986 - 1991 : Martin Barnes
- 1991 - 1993 : Tim Carter
- 1993 - 1996 : Peter Morris
- 1996 - 1998 : Rodney Turner
- 2000 - 2003 : Donald Heath
- 2003 - 2004 : Miles Shepherd
- 2004 - 2008 : Tom Taylor
- 2008 - 2012 : Mike Nichols
- 2012 - 2014 : Tom Taylor
- 2014 - 2016 : Steve Wake
- 2016 - 2020 : John McGlynn
- 2020 - 2022 : Debbie Lewis "
- 2022 - 2025 : Milla Mazilu "
- 2025 - : Amy Morley "

== See also ==
- Office of Government Commerce
- Construction Industry Council
