= David Bucknall =

David Bucknall OBE, FRICS
- Born: 1939
- Died: 7 June 2015 (aged 76)
- Education: Birmingham College of Art & Technology
- Occupation: Chartered Surveyor
- Organization: Rider Levett Bucknall
- Known for: Involvement in the construction industry

David Bucknall (1939 - 7 June 2015, aged 76), was a Partner of Bucknall Austin, later to be merged with Rider Hunt, and Levett and Bailey, to form Rider Levett Bucknall (RLB), a global construction and quantity surveying practice with 3,500 employees in 120 offices worldwide. He was also heavily involved with supporting various opportunities for young people to start careers in the construction industry, his efforts for which were recognised with the award of an OBE in the New Year Honours 2013.

== Education ==
Bucknall graduated from Birmingham College of Art & Technology in 1961.

== Career ==
He joined Bucknall Austin in 1961, a company founded some years earlier by his father, Charles Bucknall, in 1947. He was a patron for the RLB's graduate recruitment scheme, Protégé, of which he chaired the Global Construction and Quantity Surveying Board. Amongst his many notable achievements, Bucknall co-founded and chaired the Birmingham Community Foundation Charity, which helped fund local community projects, including for the £5.5M acquisition and full restoration of the derelict Victorian baths in Nechells, turning it over for community use. He was awarded honorary Doctorates from the University of Wolverhampton and Birmingham City University. Notable projects that he managed included the construction of Birmingham's Symphony Hall, Birmingham International Convention Centre (ICC) and Birmingham National Indoor Arena (NIA). He also cost-managed the repair and restoration of Windsor Castle following the fire in 1992, and project managed the construction of the new Telecom Tower in Kuala Lumpur.

== Retirement ==
Bucknall officially retired from RLB in September 2012, although he remained a chairman of the RICS Quantity Surveyors and Construction Professional Group, and the Birmingham Community Foundation. He died unexpectedly during cycling training for an Iron Man Triathlon on 7 June 2015.
