= Reichsluftschutzbund =

Nazi Germany Air Protection League

National Air Raid Protection League
- Reichsluftschutzbund
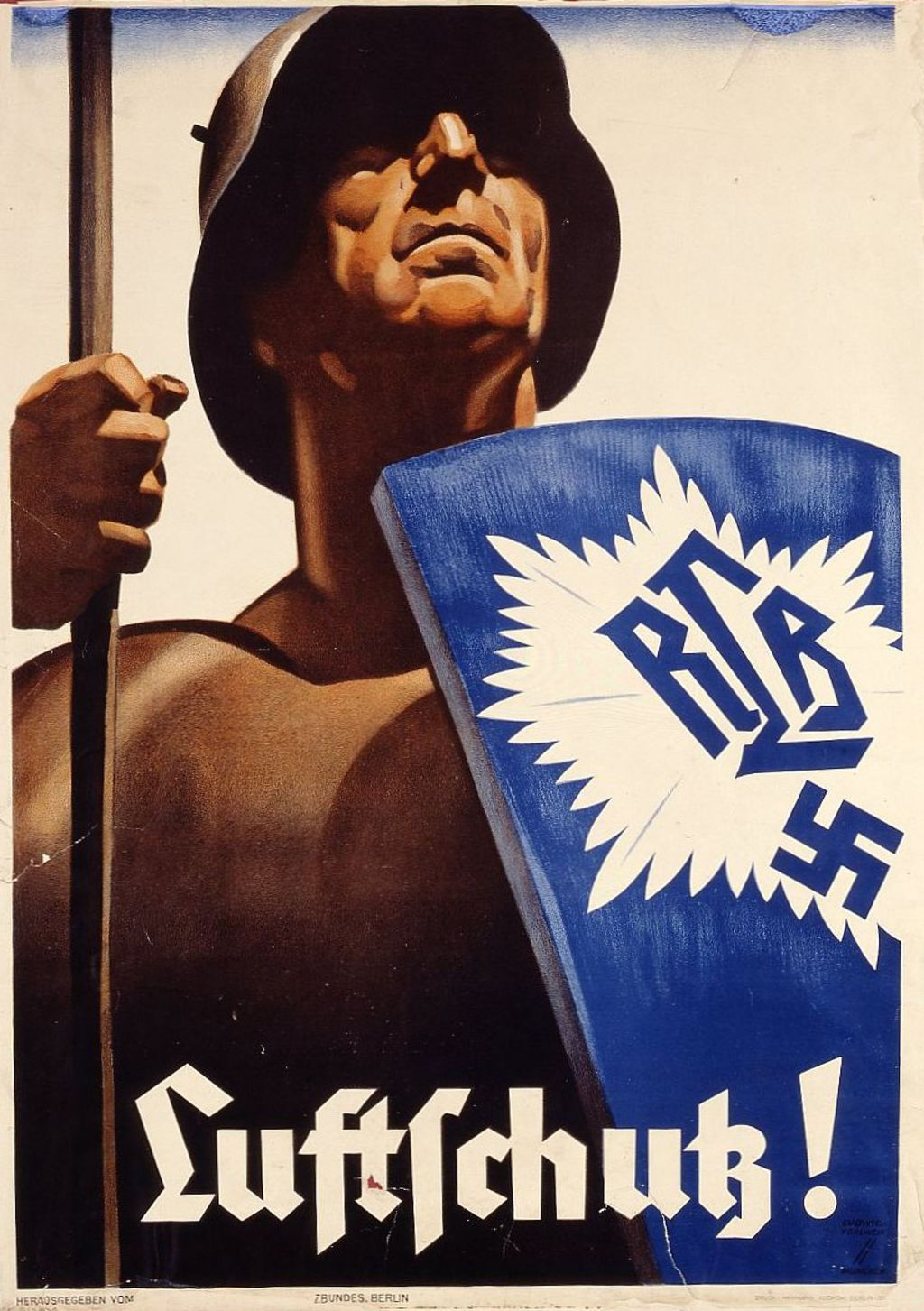
- RLB poster from c. 1943

Agency overview
- Formed: 29 April 1933
- Dissolved: 1945
- Jurisdiction: Nazi Germany
- Minister responsible: Hermann Göring, Reich minister of Aviation
- Agency executive: See list, RLB-Präsident

The Reichsluftschutzbund (RLB; "Reich Air Protection League") was a civil defense organization in Nazi Germany in charge of air raid precautions in residential areas and among smaller businesses.

== Purpose ==
The RLB was organized by Hermann Göring in 1933 as a voluntary association. Existing volunteer air raid precaution associations were forced to merge with RLB. In 1939 the RLB became a Körperschaft des öffentlichen Rechts (quasi-autonomous non-governmental organization), while in 1944 it became an affiliated organization of the Nazi Party. RLB was dissolved by the Allied Powers after the end of World War II. Its successor in the Federal Republic of Germany was the Bundesverband für den Selbstschutz.

The RLB was in charge of educating and training ordinary German men and women in civil defence procedures necessary for the basic level of local self-help of the civil population against air raids. The local level was formed around air raid wardens and operated in small first intervention squads. The training include fire fighting, protection against chemical weapons, communication procedures and preparation of houses and apartments against air raids.

== Organization ==
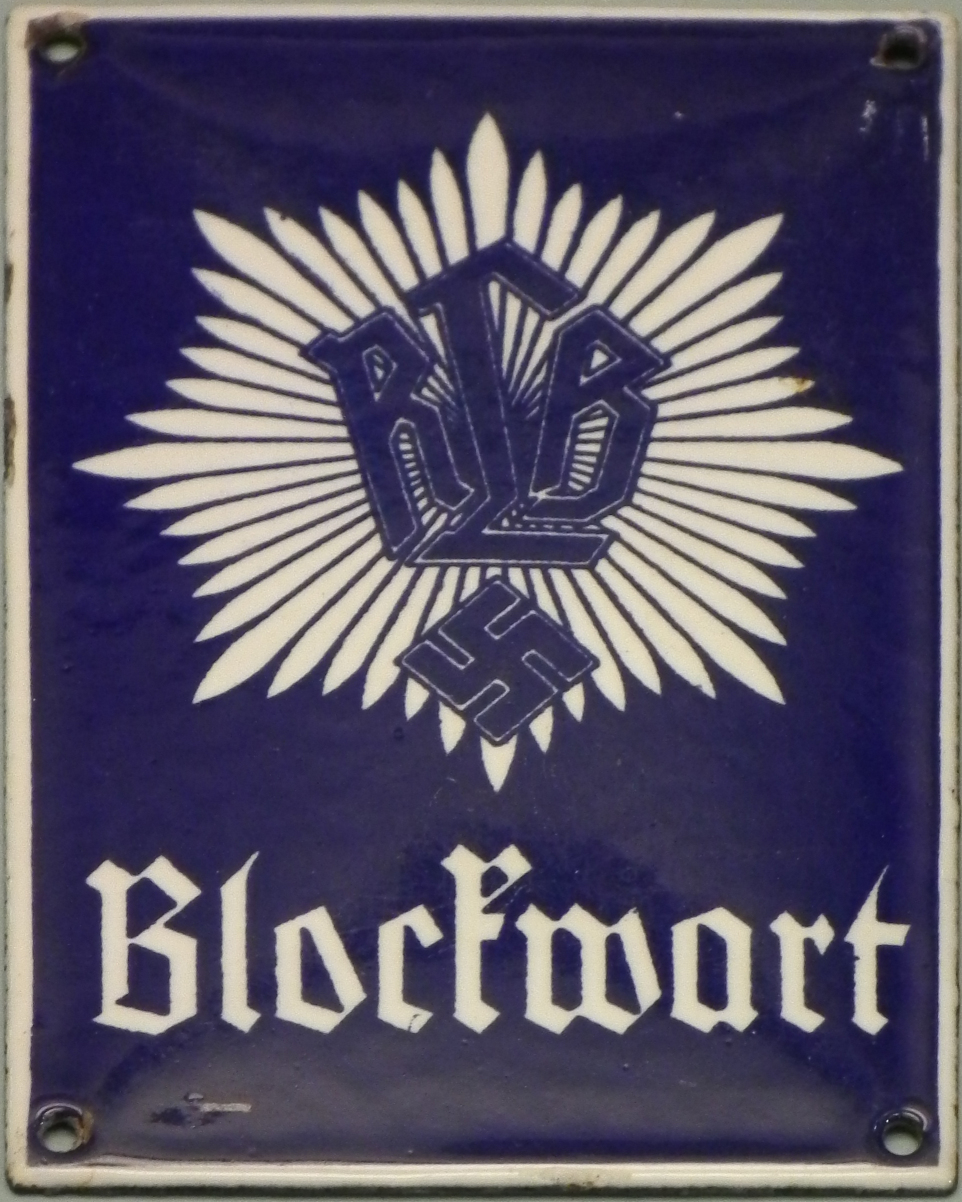
Sign denoting a block warden post.

In 1939 the RLB had about 15 million members, 820,000 volunteer functionaries (of whom 280,000 were women) and 75,000 local units. The membership was trained at 3,800 civil defence schools with 28,000 instructors.

- RLB was led by a Präsidium, whose president, and vice president and chief of staff, were active duty general officers of the Luftwaffe. The presidium was in itself a department immediately subordinated to the Ministry of Aviation.
- Coterminous with each Luftgaukommando (air district command) was a RLB-Gruppe (RLB-group) under a leader aided by 46 full-time staff members.
- For each Regierungsbezirk, there was a RLB-Bezirksgruppe (regional group).
- The basic organization was the RLB-Revier, one for each police precinct in the cities, or the RLB-Gemeinde-Gruppe, one for each urban or rural municipality for the rest of the country. In the case of a city with several precincts, the citywide organization was called an RLB-Ortsgruppe (local group). Several municipal groups formed an RLB-Ortskreisgruppe, one for each Landkreis. Each Ortsgruppe and Ortskreisgruppe had a leader and a staff of nine members, of which five where full-time salaried employees.
- The basic organizations had a varied number of Untergruppen (sub-groups) divided into Blöcke (blocks) under Blockwarte (block wardens) which controlled and liaised with a number of Luftschutzgemeinschaften (air raid protection communities) under Luftschutzwarte (air raid wardens). Each community consisted of an apartment building or several smaller buildings, although a large apartment complex could have several communities. In addition to the warden, the community should have an assistant warden, house fire fighters, helpers and messengers as a first intervention squad. Duty in these squads was compulsory (Notdienstpflicht) for the civilian population.

== Image gallery ==
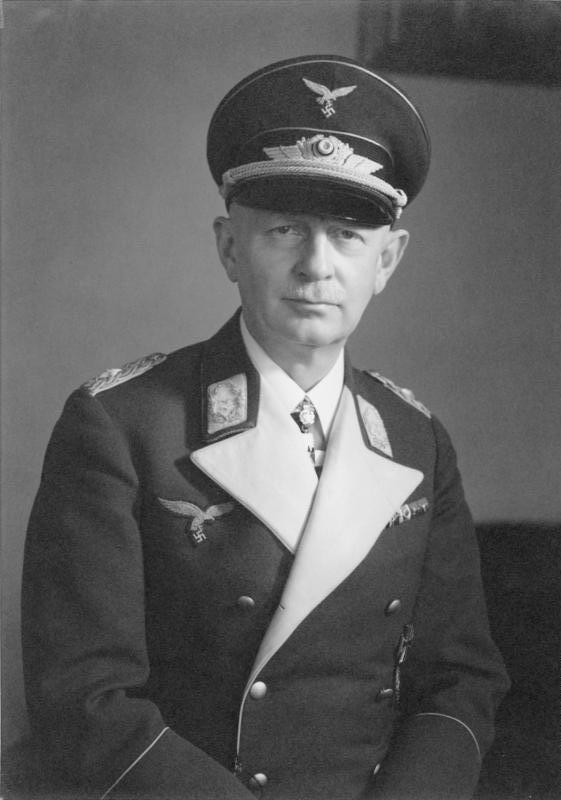
Major General Heinrich Niehoff, Chief of Staff of the Reich Air Raid Protection League

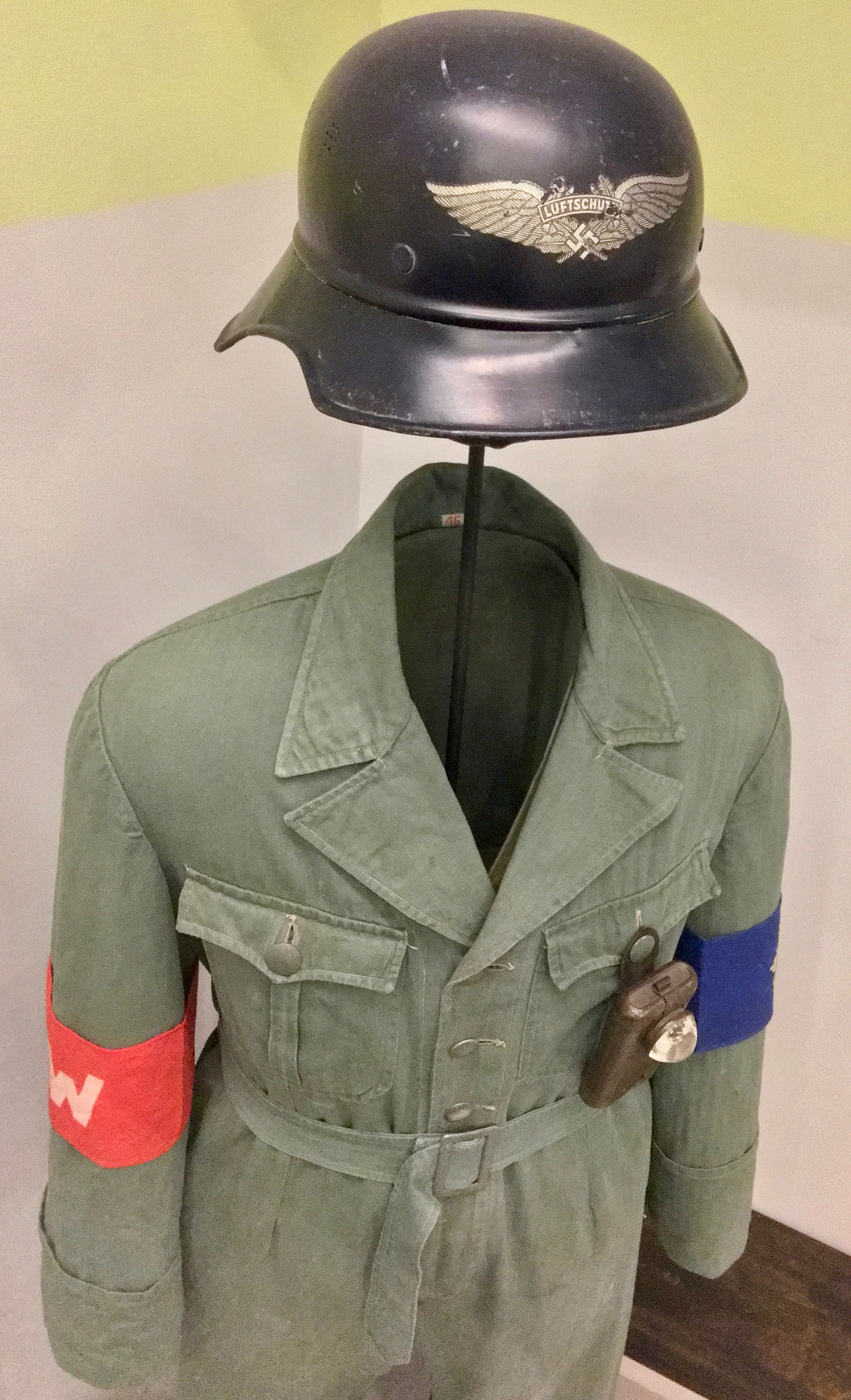
RLB-uniform with RLB-armband and armband for Luftschutzwarte.

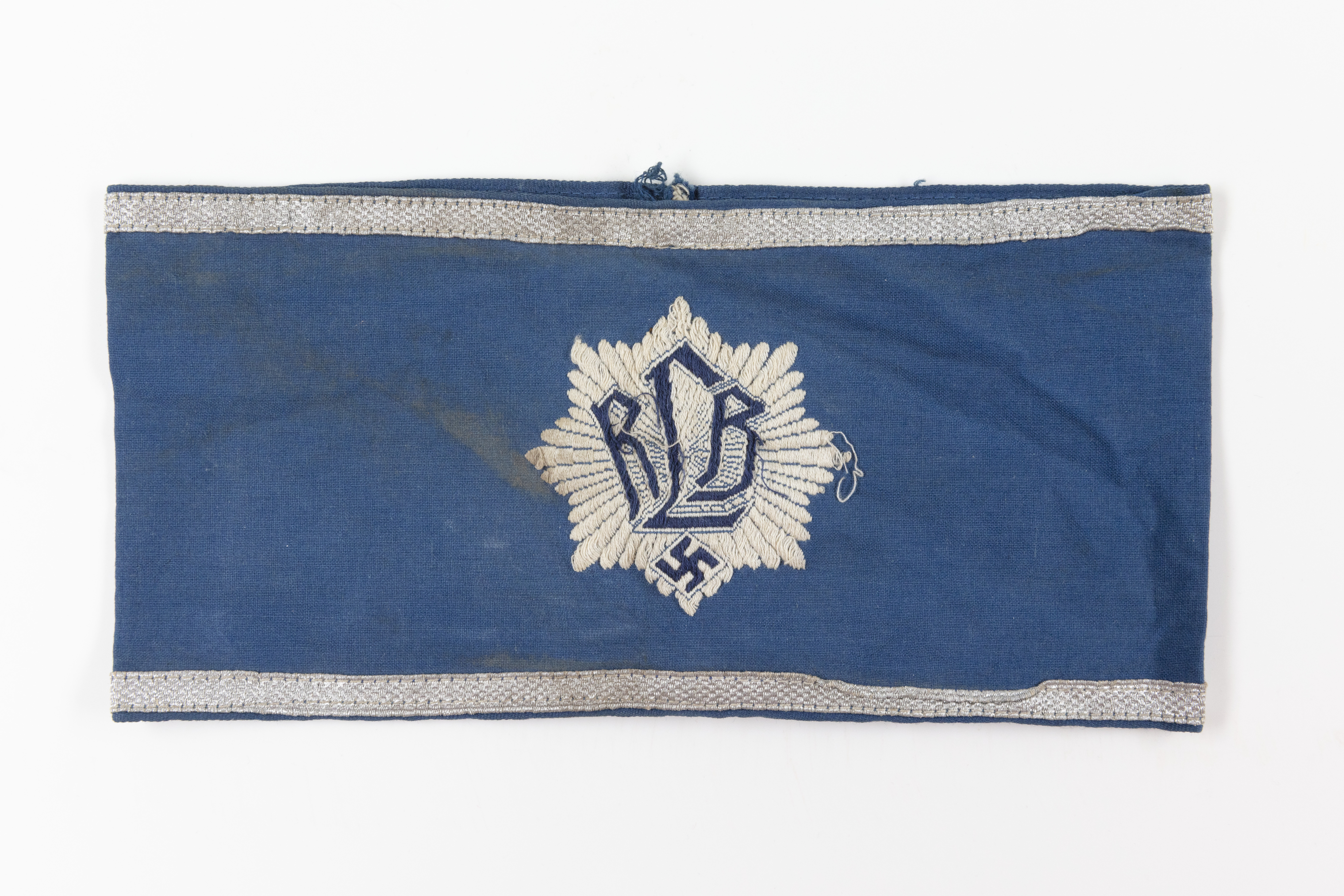
RLB-armband

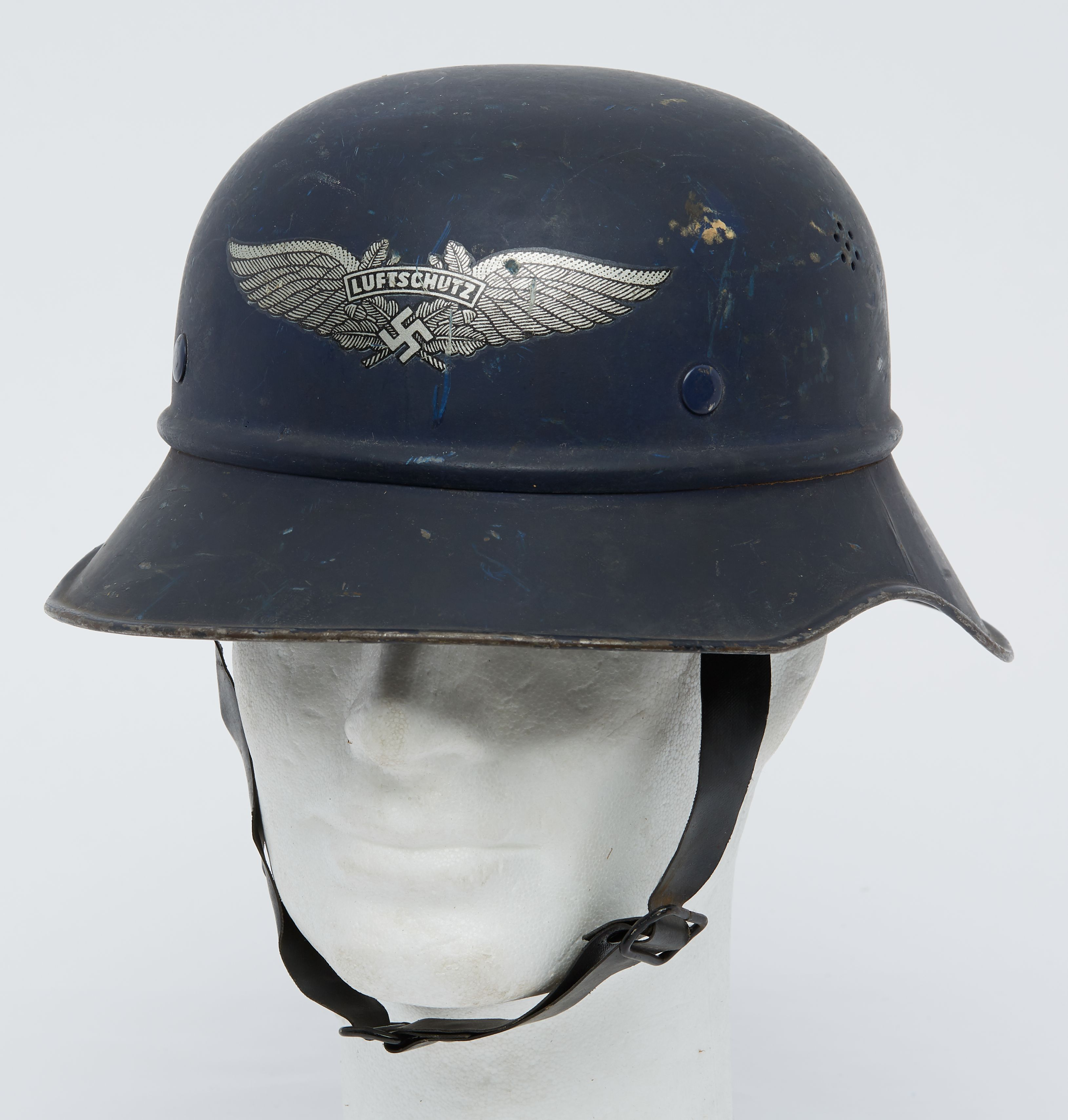
RLB-helmet

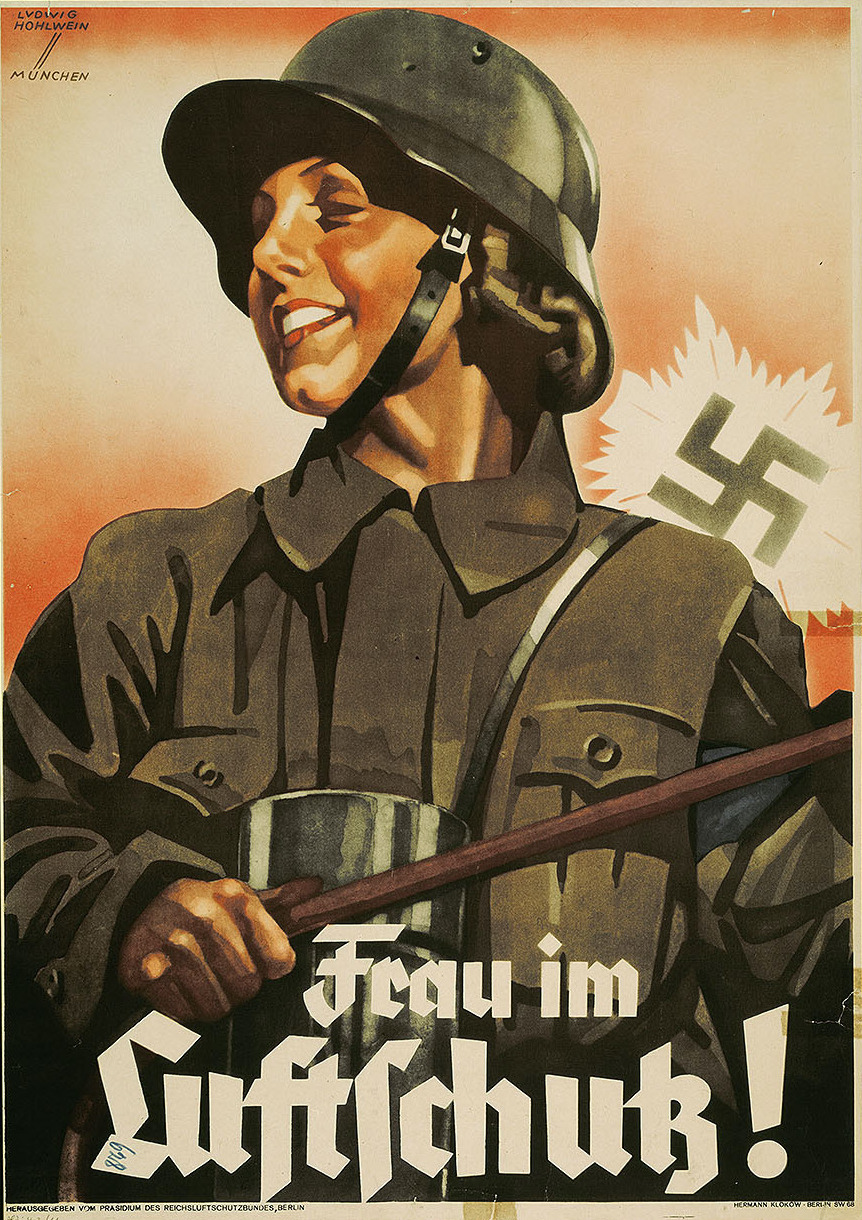
Women in the air raid protection. Poster from 1936.

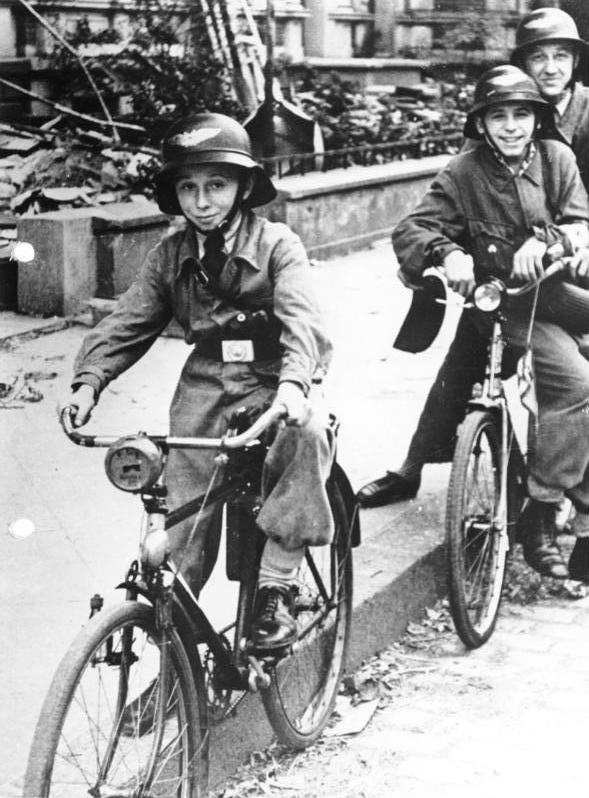
Boys serving as messengers with RLB-helmets.

== Flags ==
1

2

3

1 = Flag of the RLB 1933–1939
2 = Flag of the RLB, 1939–1945
3 = Color of a RLB-Ortskreisgruppe (here St. Goarshausen), from 1939

== Rank insignia ==
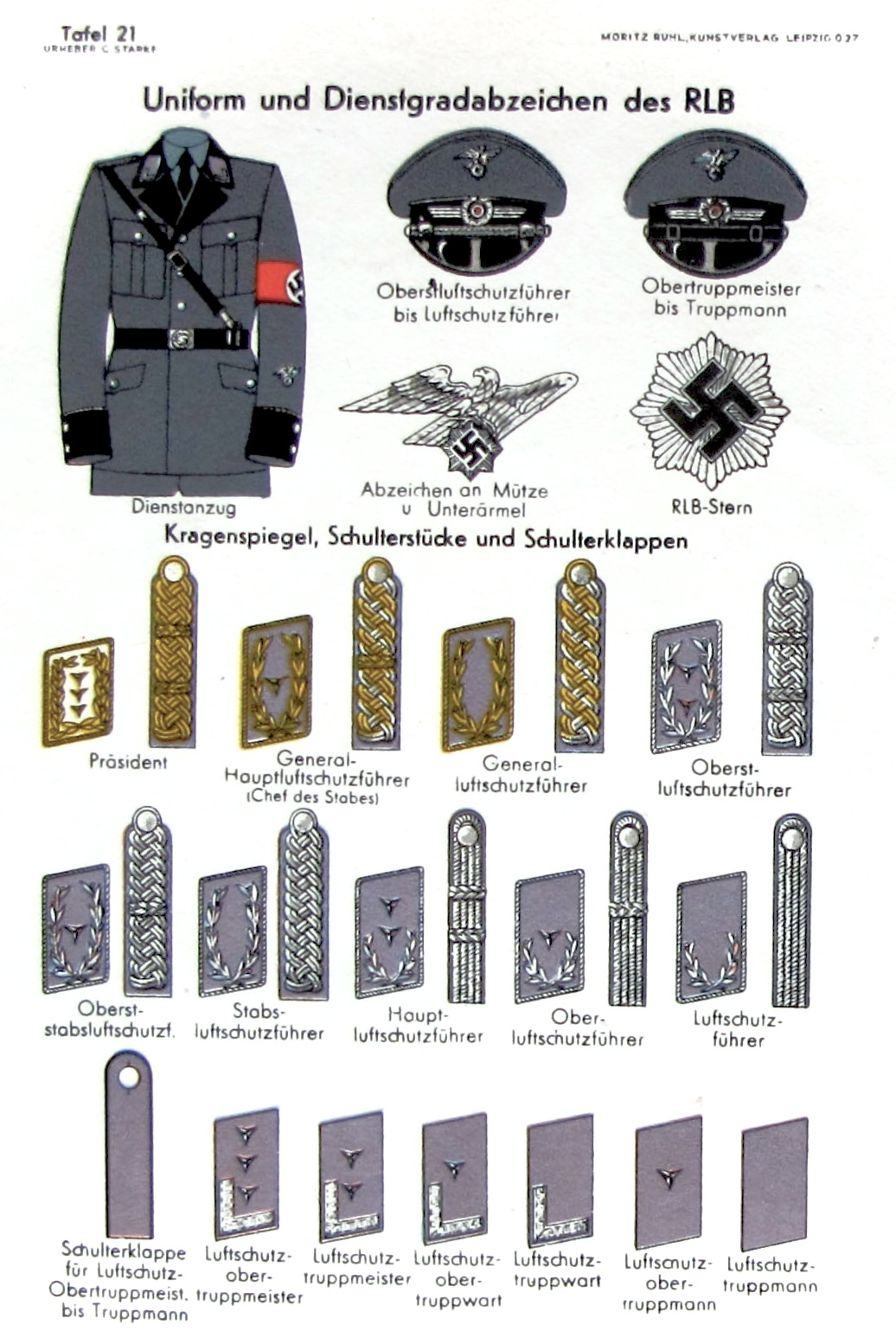
RLB insignia, 1939 Illustration: Deutsche Uniformen (later edition)

== See also ==
- Civil Defence Decoration
- Luftschutzpolizei
- Air Protection Act, 26 June 1935 (in German)
