= Military ranks of the Weimar Republic =

The military ranks of the Weimar Republic were the military ranks used by the Reichswehr.

== Military ranks of the Peacetime Army (1919) ==
The Peacetime Army (German: Friedensheer) continued to use the uniforms of the Imperial German Army, however, the ranks were influenced by Soviet insignia. The ranks were used from January 1919 to May 1919.

=== Commissioned officers ===
| Rank group | Generals | | | Officers |
|---|---|---|---|---|---|---|---|---|---|
| (Weimar Republic) Heer |
| (Weimar Republic) Heer | General der Waffengattung | Generalleutnant | Generalmajor | Oberst | Oberstleutnant | Major | Hauptmann | Oberleutnant | Leutnant; Feldwebelleutnant |

=== Enlisted personnel ===
| Rank group | NCOs | | | | Other ranks |
|---|---|---|---|---|---|---|
| (Weimar Republic) Heer |
| (Weimar Republic) Heer | Feldwebel | Vizefeldwebel | Fähnrich; Sergeant | Unteroffizier | Gefreiter | Soldat |

== Military ranks of the Provisional Reichswehr (1919–1920) ==
The Provisional Reichswehr (German: Vorläufige Reichswehr) introduced slightly more elaborate insignia than the Peacetime Army.

=== Commissioned officers ===
| Rank group | Generals | | | Officers |
|---|---|---|---|---|---|---|---|---|---|
| (Weimar Republic) Heer |
| (Weimar Republic) Heer | General der Waffengattung | Generalleutnant | Generalmajor | Oberst | Oberstleutnant | Major | Hauptmann | Oberleutnant | Leutnant/ Feldwebelleutnant |

=== Enlisted personnel ===
| Rank group | NCOs | | | | | Other ranks |
|---|---|---|---|---|---|---|---|---|
| (Weimar Republic) Heer |
| (Weimar Republic) Heer | Offiziersstellvertreter | Feldwebel | Vizefeldwebel | Fähnrich/ Sergeant | Unteroffizier | Obergefreiter | Gefreiter | Wehrmann |

== Military ranks of the Reichswehr (1920–1935) ==
=== Commissioned officers ===
| Rank group | Generals | | | Officers |
|---|---|---|---|---|---|---|---|---|---|
| (Weimar Republic) Heer |
| (Weimar Republic) Heer | General der Waffengattung | Generalleutnant | Generalmajor | Oberst | Oberstleutnant | Major | Hauptmann | Oberleutnant | Leutnant |
| (Weimar Republic) Reichsmarine |
| (Weimar Republic) Reichsmarine | Admiral | Vizeadmiral | Konteradmiral | Kapitän zur See | Fregattenkapitän | Korvettenkapitän | Kapitänleutnant | Oberleutnant zur See | Leutnant zur See |

=== Enlisted personnel ===
| Rank group | NCOs | | | | Other ranks |
|---|---|---|---|---|---|---|---|---|---|
| (Weimar Republic) Heer | | | | | | | | | No insignia |
| (Weimar Republic) Heer | Oberfeldwebel | Feldwebel | Unterfeldwebel | Unteroffizier | Stabsgefreiter (introduced 1927) | Obergefreiter | Gefreiter | Oberschütze | Schütze |
| (Weimar Republic) Reichsmarine | | | | | | | | | No insignia |
| (Weimar Republic) Reichsmarine | Oberfeldwebel | Feldwebel | Obermaat | Maat | | Obergefreiter | Gefreiter | Obermatrose | Matrose |

=== Waffenfarben ===
| Regiment or Battalion type | Colour (Note: In addition to the colours, monograms and symbols were used to denominate services or units.) |
|---|---|
| General officers Artillery; Ordnance troops | Scarlet (German: Hochrot) |
| Staff Corps of the Reichswehr; Veterinary service | Carmine (Karmesin) |
| Infantry | White |
| Motor transport | Rose-pink (Rosa) |
| Signals | Light brown |
| Cavalry | Golden yellow |
| Jäger (light infantry) | Dark green |
| Transport (horse-drawn) | Light blue |
| Medical service | Dark blue |
| Engineers | Black |
