= Ranks and insignia of the Waffen-SS =

This table contains the final ranks and insignia of the Waffen-SS, which were in use from April 1942 to May 1945, in comparison to the Wehrmacht. The highest ranks of the combined SS (German: Gesamt-SS) was that of Reichsführer-SS and Oberster Führer der SS; however, there was no Waffen-SS equivalent to these positions.

== Table ==
Insignia			Title (English)	German Army equivalent	Approximate equivalents/translations during World War II	
Collar	Shoulder	Sleeve (parka/camo)	Title (English)	German Army equivalent	U.S.	UK
General ranks
			SS-Oberst-Gruppenführer und Generaloberst der Waffen-SS (SS-Supreme group leader and colonel general of the Waffen-SS)	Generaloberst	General	General
			SS-Obergruppenführer und General der Waffen-SS (SS-Senior group leader and general of the Waffen-SS)	General der Waffengattung	Lieutenant general	Lieutenant-general
			SS-Gruppenführer und Generalleutnant der Waffen-SS (SS-Group leader and lieutenant general of the Waffen-SS)	Generalleutnant	Major general	Major general
			SS-Brigadeführer und Generalmajor der Waffen-SS (SS-Brigadier leader and major general of the Waffen-SS)	Generalmajor	Brigadier general	Brigadier
Officer ranks
			SS-Oberführer (SS-Senior leader)	No army equivalent; equivalent to Kommodore in the Kriegsmarine	Senior colonel	Colonel
			SS-Standartenführer (SS-Standard leader)	Oberst	Colonel	Colonel
			SS-Obersturmbannführer (SS-Senior assault unit leader)	Oberstleutnant	Lieutenant colonel	Lieutenant colonel
			SS-Sturmbannführer (SS-Assault unit leader)	Major	Major	Major
			SS-Hauptsturmführer (SS-Head assault leader)	Hauptmann/Rittmeister	Captain	Captain
			SS-Obersturmführer (SS-Senior assault leader)	Oberleutnant	First lieutenant	Lieutenant
			SS-Untersturmführer (SS-Second/Junior assault leader)	Leutnant	Second lieutenant	
Non-commissioned officer ranks
			SS-Sturmscharführer (SS-Assault section leader)	Stabsfeldwebel	Sergeant major	Regimental sergeant major
Various; Depending on rank			SS-Stabsscharführer (SS-Staff section leader) (Note: senior NCO, e.g. Hauptscharführer or Oberscharführer, seldom Scharführer.)	Hauptfeldwebel senior NCO e.g., Oberfeldwebel or Feldwebel, seldom Unterfeldwebel.	—N/a	(Company) Sergeant major
			SS-Hauptscharführer (SS-Head section leader)	Oberfeldwebel	Master sergeant	Sergeant major
			SS-Standartenoberjunker OA (Officer aspirant)	Fahnenjunker-Oberfeldwebel OA (Officer aspirant)		
			SS-Oberscharführer (SS-Senior section leader)	Feldwebel	Technical sergeant	Staff sergeant
			SS-Standartenjunker OA (Officer aspirant)	Fahnenjunker-Feldwebel OA (Officer aspirant)		
			SS-Scharführer (SS-Section leader)	Unterfeldwebel	Staff sergeant	Sergeant
			SS-Oberjunker OA (Officer aspirant)	Fahnenjunker-Unterfeldwebel OA (Officer aspirant)		
			SS-Unterscharführer (SS-Junior section leader)	Unteroffizier	Sergeant	Corporal
			SS-Junker OA (Officer aspirant)	Fahnenjunker-Unteroffizier OA (Officer aspirant)		
Enlisted ranks
No equivalent (Note: However, administratively Rottenführer (2. Gehaltsstufe) existed.)				Stabsgefreiter	Administrative corporal	Lance corporal
			SS-Rottenführer (SS-Squad leader)	Obergefreiter	Corporal	Lance corporal
			SS-Sturmmann (SS-Assault man/Storm trooper)	Gefreiter	Acting corporal	Senior private
			SS-Oberschütze (SS-Senior rifleman)	Oberschütze	Private first class	Senior private
		No insignia	SS-Schütze (SS-Rifleman)	Soldat, Schütze, Grenadier	Private	Private

Remarks

- SS-Bewerber (SS-applicant) and SS-Anwärter (SS-aspirant) were both removed as Waffen-SS ranks before 1941.

== See also ==
- Comparative military ranks of World War II
- Corps colours (Waffen-SS)
- Glossary of Nazi Germany
- List of SS personnel
- Ranks and Insignia of the German Army in World War II
- SS-Degen
- Uniforms and insignia of the Schutzstaffel

== Bibliography ==
- Bender, Roger James; Taylor, Hugh Page (1986). Uniforms Organization and History of the Waffen-SS Vol 1 (6th ed.). San Jose, CA: R. James Bender Publishing. ISBN 0-912138-02-5.
- CIA (24 August 1999). "Records Integration Title Book" (PDF). Archived from the original (PDF) on January 23, 2017.
- Mollo, Andrew (1977). A pictorial history of the S.S., 1923-1945. New York: Stein and Day. ISBN 978-0356082271.
- Mollo, Andrew (1992). Uniforms of the SS, Collected Edition Vol. 6. Windrow & Greene. ISBN 1-872004-67-9.
- War Department (15 March 1945). "Chapter IX: Uniforms, Insignia, and Individual Equipment". War Department Technical Manual TM-E 30-451. Plate XX–XXI.
- Zabecki, David T., ed. (2014). Germany at War: 400 Years of Military History. ABC-CLIO. ISBN 978-1598849806.
