= Mann (paramilitary rank) =

Rank in the SS

- SS Gorget patch

- SS Shoulder insignia
- Country: Nazi Germany
- Service branch: National Socialist Motor Corps; National Socialist Flyers Corps; Postschutz; Reich Labour Service; Reichsluftschutzbund; Schutzstaffel; Sturmabteilung; Technische Nothilfe
- Formation: 1925
- Abolished: 1945
- Next higher rank: Luftschutzobertruppmann (RLB); Oberschütze (SS); Sturmmann (SA, NSKK & NSFK); Vormann (RAD & TN)
- Next lower rank: Bewerber; Jungmann; Anwärter; Vollanwärter
- Equivalent ranks: Soldat; Schütze

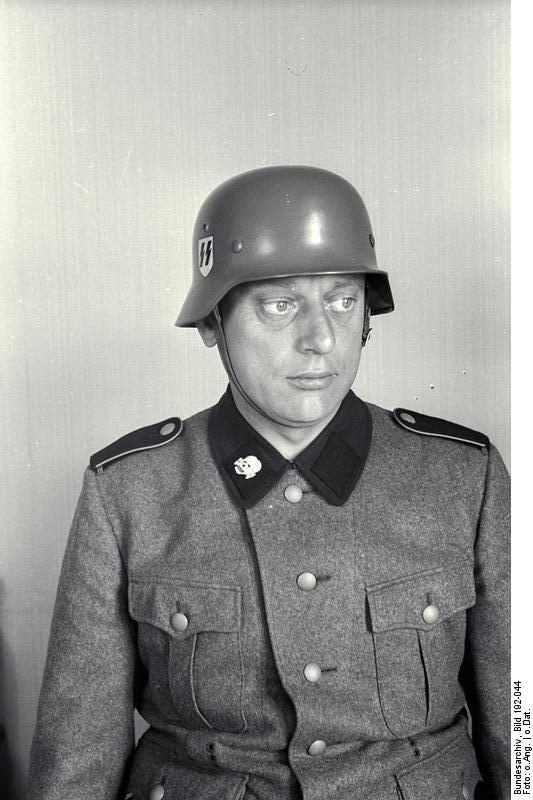
SS-Mann from KZ Mauthausen

Mann (English: "man" or "male"), was a paramilitary rank used by several Nazi Party paramilitary organizations between 1925 and 1945. The rank is most often associated with the Schutzstaffel (SS-Mann), but also was a rank of the SA, where Mann (SA-Mann) was the lowest enlisted rank and was the equivalent of a private.

In 1938, with the rise of the SS-Verfügungstruppe (later renamed the Waffen-SS), the SS changed the rank of Mann to Schütze, although it still retained the original SS rank of Mann for the Allgemeine-SS (general SS). The rank of Mann was junior to SS-Sturmmann.

In most Nazi Party organizations, the rank of Mann held no distinctive insignia. Some groups, however, granted a minor form of rank insignia such as a blank collar patch or simple shoulder board to denote the rank of Mann. (see right: SS rank insignia pattern from 1933)

Even lower ranks, e.g. Bewerber, Jungmann, Anwärter, Vollanwärter, were established in the mid-1930s as a recruit or candidate position, held by an individual seeking an appointment as a Mann in a Nazi Party paramilitary organization.

== Insignia ==
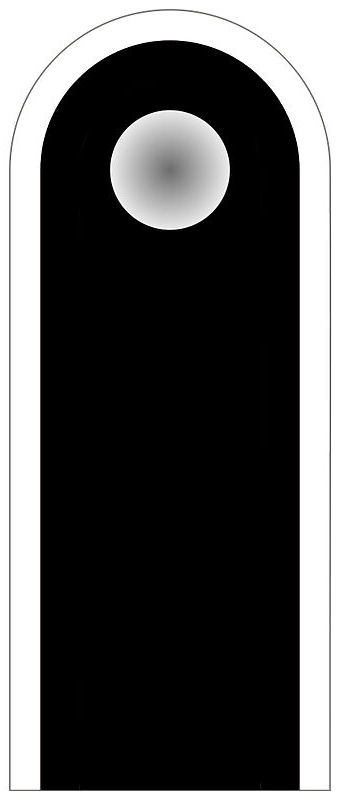
SS-Mann (Allgemeine SS) & SS-Schütze (Waffen-SS), shoulder strap

SS-Mann/ SS-Schütze, collar patch (1940-1945)

SA Gorget patches

RBL collar patch
(Luftschutztruppmann)

NSFK Gorget patch

NSKK Gorget patch

Volkssturmmann (Volkssturm)

RAD Gorget patch
(Arbeitsmann)

TeNo shoulder strap

Postschutz Gorget patch
(Postschutzmann)

Candidate status: SS-Bewerber (Staffel-Bewerber); SS-Jungmann (Staffel-Jungmann); SS-Anwärter (Staffel-Anwärter); SS-Vollanwärter (Staffel-Vollanwärter)	1st rank Allgemeine SS; SS-Mann	2nd rank no equivalent	3rd rank SS-Sturmmann
Volunteer for joining the Waffen-SS: SS-Bewerber (Staffel-Bewerber); SS-Jungmann (Staffel-Jungmann); SS-Anwärter (Staffel-Anwärter)	1st Rank Waffen-SS; SS-Schütze	2nd rank SS-Oberschütze	3rd rank SS-Sturmmann
Candidate status SA-Anwärter	1st SA rank SA-Mann	2nd rank no equivalent	3rd rank SA-Sturmmann
person liable to military service Wehrmacht	1st Wehrmacht rank Soldat	2nd rank Oberschütze	3rd rank Gefreiter

== Bibliography ==
- Flaherty, T. H. (2004) [1988]. The Third Reich: The SS. Time-Life Books, Inc. ISBN 1-84447-073-3.
- McNab, Chris (2009). The SS: 1923–1945. Amber Books Ltd. ISBN 978-1-906626-49-5.
- McNab, Chris (2009b). The Third Reich. Amber Books Ltd. ISBN 978-1-906626-51-8.
