= Oberstabsgefreiter =

German military rank

- Heer shoulder and Marine sleeve insignia
- Country: Germany
- Service branch: German Army; German Navy; German Air Force
- Abbreviation: OStGefr.
- Rank group: Enlisted rank
- NATO rank code: OR-4
- Pay grade: 5A
- Formation: 1995
- Next higher rank: Korporal
- Next lower rank: Stabsgefreiter

Oberstabsgefreiter (German: [oːbɐˈʃtaːpsɡəˌfʁaɪ̯tɐ], abbreviated OStGefr, on lists OSG; "Senior Staff Gefreiter") was the highest enlisted rank in the German Bundeswehr before the new ranks Korporal and Stabskorporal were introduced in October 2021. The rank can be comparable to corporal in Anglophone armed forces.

rank insignia field- and battle dress

Heer

Luftwaffe

Marine

== History ==
The rank was first introduced by the Kriegsmarine in 1940 and was named Matrosenoberstabsgefreiter ("Seaman Senior Staff Gefreiter"). In Heer and Luftwaffe, the rank did not exist.

Final ranks to enlisted men until 1945
Waffen-SS	Heer (Army)	Luftwaffe (Air Force)	Kriegsmarine (Navy)
SS-Schütze	Schütze	Flieger	Matrose
SS-Oberschütze	Oberschütze	Flieger	Matrose
SS-Sturmmann	Gefreiter		Matrosengefreiter
SS-Rottenführer	Obergefreiter		Matrosenobergefreiter
No equivalent		Hauptgefreiter	Matrosenhauptgefreiter
No equivalent	Stabsgefreiter		Matrosenstabsgefreiter
No equivalent			Matrosenoberstabsgefreiter

== Bundeswehr ==
A private of the German Bundeswehr might be promoted to that OR4-rank after a regular service time of 48 months.

junior Rank; Stabsgefreiter	(German enlisted men rank); Oberstabsgefreiter	senior Rank; Korporal
