= Sturmmann =

Nazi paramilitary rank

- SS Gorget patch

- SS Shoulder and sleeve insignia
- Country: Nazi Germany
- Service branch: Hitler Youth; National Socialist Motor Corps; National Socialist Flyers Corps; Schutzstaffel; Sturmabteilung
- Formation: 1921
- Abolished: 1945
- Next higher rank: Rottenführer
- Next lower rank: Oberschütze (Waffen-SS); Mann (Allgemeine SS and SA)
- Equivalent ranks: Gefreiter

Sturmmann (German: [ˈʃtʊʁmman], lit. 'Storm man') was a Nazi Party paramilitary rank that was first created in the year 1921. The rank of Sturmmann was used by the Sturmabteilung (SA) and the Schutzstaffel (SS).

The word originated during World War I when Sturmmann was a position held by soldiers in German pioneer assault companies, also known as "shock troops".

== Creation ==
Following the defeat of Germany in 1918, Sturmmann became a paramilitary rank of the Freikorps, violent groups of military veterans who opposed Germany's loss of World War I and the subsequent Treaty of Versailles.

In 1921, Sturmmann became a paramilitary title of the Nazi Party's private army, the Sturmabteilung (SA or "Assault Detachment"). Sturmmann would eventually become a basic paramilitary rank of almost every Nazi organization, but is most closely associated as an SA rank and as a rank of the SS.

The rank of Sturmmann was bestowed upon those members of the SA and SS who had served for six months in the organization and had demonstrated basic abilities and competence.

== Use ==
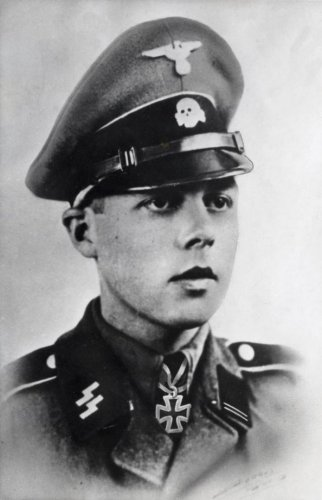
SS-Sturmmann Gerardus Mooyman

Final ranks to enlisted men until 1945
Waffen-SS	Heer (Army)	Luftwaffe (Air Force)	Kriegsmarine (Navy)
SS-Schütze	Schütze	Flieger	Matrose
SS-Oberschütze	Oberschütze	Flieger	Matrose
SS-Sturmmann	Gefreiter		Matrosengefreiter
SS-Rottenführer	Obergefreiter		Matrosenobergefreiter
No equivalent		Hauptgefreiter	Matrosenhauptgefreiter
No equivalent	Stabsgefreiter		Matrosenstabsgefreiter
No equivalent			Matrosenoberstabsgefreiter

Sturmmann was senior to the rank of Mann in the Allgemeine-SS (general-SS). In organizations which did not use the rank of Mann (such as the National Socialist Motor Corps), the rank of Sturmmann was the equivalent of a private and wore a blank collar patch with no insignia. Within the Waffen-SS, an SS-Sturmmann was senior to an SS-Oberschütze.

The rank of Sturmmann was junior, in both the SS and SA, to the rank of Rottenführer. It was considered the equivalent to the rank of Gefreiter in the German Army and a lance-corporal in the British Army. The insignia for Sturmmann consisted of a bare collar patch with a single silver stripe. The field grey uniforms of the Waffen-SS also displayed the sleeve chevron of a Gefreiter.

== Insignia ==
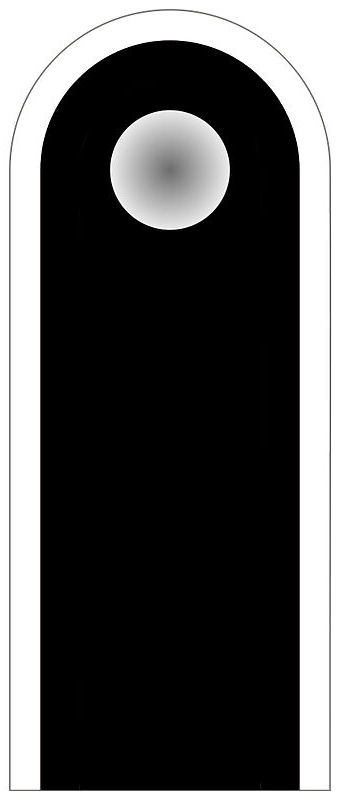
Shoulder strap (insignia) in Feldgrau
(all other enlisted ranks OR-1 to OR-3 of the Waffen-SS)

SS Gorget patches

SS Sleeve badge

SA gorget patch

NSKK gorget patch

NSFK gorget patch

== Post-war use ==
The term and rank has not been used in Germany since World War II.

== See also ==
- Table of ranks and insignia of the Waffen-SS

Junior rank SS-Mann	Rank Allgemeine SS; SS-Sturmmann	Senior rank SS-Rottenführer
Junior ranks SS-Oberschütze	Rank Waffen-SS; SS-Sturmmann	Senior rank SS-Rottenführer
Junior rank SA-Mann	SA rank SA-Sturmmann	Senior rank SA-Rottenführer
Junior rank Oberschütze also Oberkanonier; Obergrenadier (from 1942); Oberpionier; Oberfahrer; Oberfunker, etc.	Rank Wehrmacht (Heer); Gefreiter	Senior rank Obergefreiter

== Bibliography ==
- Flaherty, T. H. (2004) [1988]. The Third Reich: The SS. Time-Life Books, Inc. ISBN 1-84447-073-3.
- Lumsden, Robin (2000). A Collector's Guide To: The Waffen–SS. Ian Allan Publishing, Inc. ISBN 0-7110-2285-2.
- McNab, Chris (2009). The SS: 1923–1945. Amber Books Ltd. ISBN 978-1-906626-49-5.
- McNab, Chris (2009b). The Third Reich. Amber Books Ltd. ISBN 978-1-906626-51-8.
- Stein, George (1984) [1966]. The Waffen-SS: Hitler's Elite Guard at War 1939–1945. Cornell University Press. ISBN 0-8014-9275-0.
