= Michael Schütz =

Michael Schütz may refer to:

- Michael Schütz (composer) (born 1963), German church musician, composer and university lecturer
- Michael Schutz (professor of music cognition), American professor
- Michael Schütz (footballer) (born 1966), German football midfielder
