= Gerardus Mooyman =

SS officer (1923–1987)

Gerardus Leonardus Mooyman
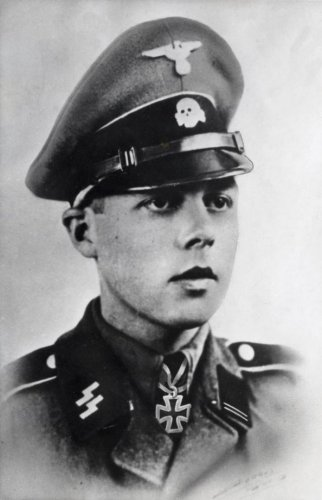
- SS-Sturmmann Gerardus Mooyman after the presentation of the Knight's Cross
- Born: September 23, 1923; Apeldoorn, Netherlands
- Died: June 21, 1987 (aged 63); Anloo, Netherlands
- Cause of death: Traffic collision
- Children: 1 daughter
- Military career
- Allegiance: Netherlands (NSB); Nazi Germany
- Branch: Waffen-SS
- Service years: 1941–1945
- Rank: SS-Untersturmführer
- Unit: 14./SS-Freiwilligen-Legion "Nederland"
- Known for: First non-German recipient of the Knight's Cross of the Iron Cross
- Conflicts: World War II: Eastern Front
- Awards: see Awards and decorations
- Other work: Small businessman (paperhanger)

Gerardus Leonardus Mooyman (23 September 1923 – 21 June 1987) was a Dutch volunteer in the Waffen-SS during the Second World War. In February 1943, at the age of 19, he became the first non-German recipient of the Knight's Cross of the Iron Cross after destroying thirteen Soviet tanks in a single day near Lake Ladoga. National Socialist propaganda subsequently made him a poster figure for Dutch collaboration and Waffen-SS recruitment. After the war he was convicted of collaboration and served part of a six-year prison sentence, later living quietly as a small businessman in Groningen.

== Early life ==
Mooyman was born on 23 September 1923 in Apeldoorn, Netherlands, into a Catholic lower-middle-class family. His father ran a small dairy-retail business that suffered badly during the Great Depression, (Note: Sources describe the father's occupation somewhat differently: the Dutch Wikipedia article and Zee (2017) describe him as a melkboer (milkman/dairy retailer); Aberfoyle International Security calls him a "dairy farmer"; and the German Wikipedia article instead describes him as a Kaufmann (merchant/businessman).) and in the resulting hardship he joined the Dutch fascist party, the Nationaal-Socialistische Beweging (NSB). Mooyman grew up in a household sympathetic to National Socialism, and one account describes him as having spent his youth fascinated by stories of German military triumphs and admiring German victories across Europe. He trained as a locksmith and worked for a time as a pharmacist's assistant before pursuing the military career his father had discouraged him from.

== Military service ==
In the spring of 1941 (Note: The Dutch Wikipedia article gives April 1941; the German Wikipedia article and other sources give April 1942 for his enlistment.) Mooyman volunteered for the SS-Freiwilligen-Standarte "Nordwest", transferring afterward to the SS-Freiwilligen-Legion "Nederland". He saw his first combat on the Volkhov Front in January 1943 (some sources say January 1942), serving in the 14th (Panzerjäger/anti-tank) company of the Legion as a gun-layer on a 7.5 cm PaK 40 anti-tank gun. For destroying several Soviet tanks he was awarded the Iron Cross, Second and First Class.

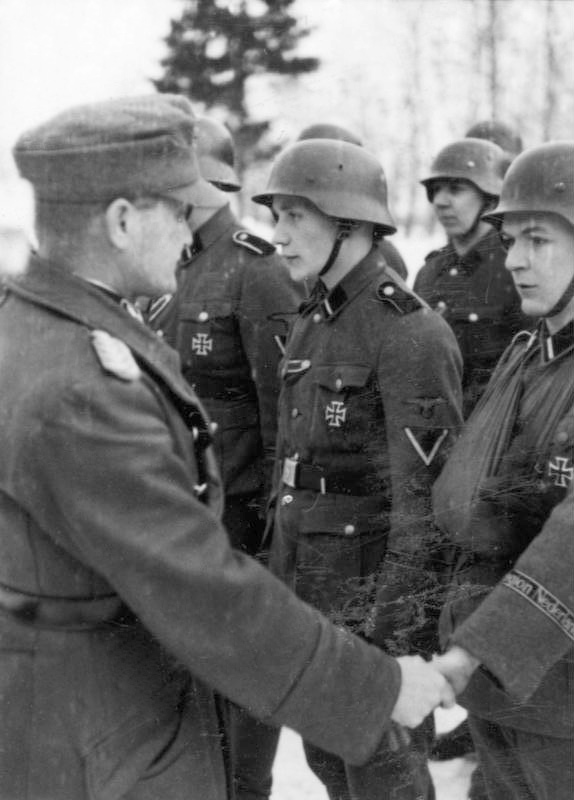
A wounded Mooyman (arm in a sling) at an awards ceremony for men of the Legion "Niederlande"

By February 1943 the Legion was positioned near Lake Ladoga, southeast of Leningrad, where it faced repeated Soviet assaults. On 4 February 1943 Mooyman destroyed four T-34 tanks; on 13 February, after the gun's regular commander was killed, he took command of the piece and destroyed a further seven tanks in a single engagement — thirteen in total on that day alone. That night, his crew reportedly discovered Soviet troops attempting to dig in an anti-tank gun of their own, and Mooyman used explosives to destroy it. By the time he left the front line, he was credited with a wartime total of 23 enemy tanks destroyed.

For this feat, the nineteen-year-old Mooyman was awarded the Knight's Cross of the Iron Cross on 20 February 1943 — the first Dutchman, and the first non-German volunteer of any nationality, to receive the decoration. According to Scherzer, he held this award as gun leader (Geschützführer) in the 14./SS-Freiwilligen-Legion "Niederlande". He received the award in person from SS-Gruppenführer Fritz von Scholz. The NSB leader Anton Mussert welcomed him at a public reception in Utrecht on 28 March 1943, and he was personally congratulated by Reichsführer-SS Heinrich Himmler.

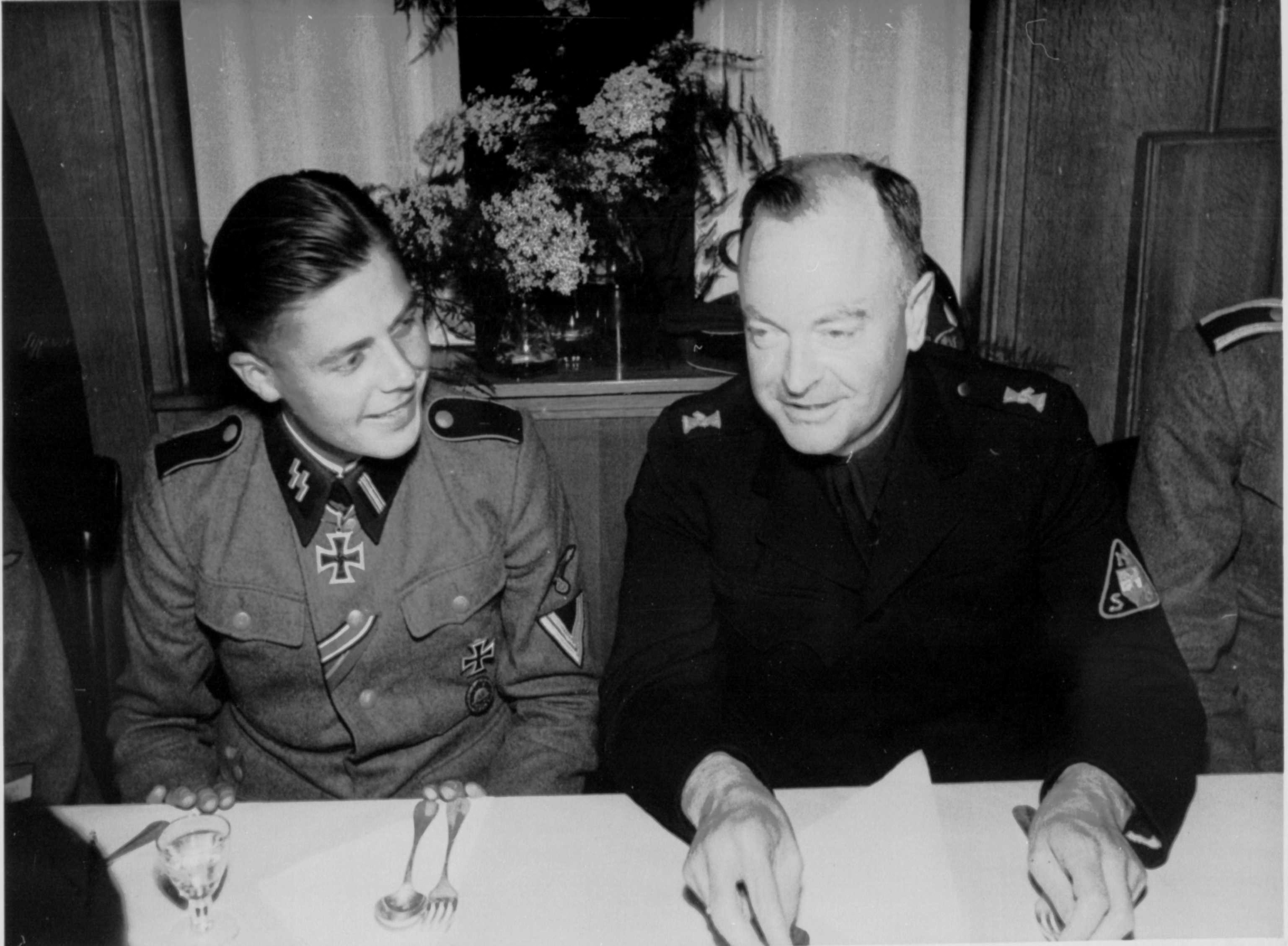
Mooyman visiting NSB leader Anton Mussert, 28 March 1943

=== Propaganda role ===
The Nazi and NSB propaganda apparatus publicized Mooyman's story widely in Dutch and German newspapers and magazines, presenting him as an example to Dutch youth of the honour to be won by volunteering for the Waffen-SS. He was paraded through a long series of public receptions, parties, and parades, and several Dutch towns proposed naming streets or squares after him — an honour he later said he tried to refuse. (Note: The German Wikipedia article states that he personally refused this honour, according to his own later account.)

He subsequently trained as a non-commissioned officer (SS-Scharführer) at Radolfzell in the summer of 1943, then was sent to the SS-Junkerschule officer training school at Bad Tölz in late August 1943, where he was a cadet in the 11th war cadet course (11. Kriegsjunkerlehrgang). He returned to the Eastern Front in the spring of 1944, serving near Narva as an SS-Standartenoberjunker (officer cadet), and was commissioned as an SS-Untersturmführer der Reserve (reserve second lieutenant) on 21 June 1944.

== Capture and imprisonment ==
Mooyman was taken prisoner by American forces on 4 May 1945. He escaped captivity within days and went into hiding in Germany. He was arrested in the Netherlands in March 1946 (Note: WW2 Gravestone places the arrest at Bodegraven; the Dutch Wikipedia article does not specify a location.) and, while being transferred from Scheveningen to Delft, escaped a second time before being recaptured in August 1946. He stood trial in October 1946 (Note: WW2 Gravestone gives 1947 for the trial date.) and was convicted of active military collaboration for his Waffen-SS service, receiving a sentence of six years' imprisonment. He was released early, at the end of August 1949, after serving about three years.

== Later life ==
After his release, Mooyman lived an unobtrusive life as a self-employed businessman in the city of Groningen, running a paperhanging (wallpaper-hanging) business — some sources place this specifically in the village of Hoogkerk — and serving as secretary of a local football club. He married and had a daughter.

He returned briefly to public attention in 1967 (Note: Some sources, including a 1969 reprint of the interview referenced in the German Wikipedia article, date the Revue interview to 1969.) when he gave an interview to the magazine Revue. In it, he expressed revulsion at the crimes of the Nazi regime, said he considered himself partly responsible for them as a military collaborator in the Waffen-SS, and stated that he had made "a mistake in thinking". He later gave away his Knight's Cross to a collector.

Gerardus Mooyman was killed in a road traffic accident near Anloo, in the Dutch province of Drenthe, on 21 June 1987, at the age of 63.

== Military ranks ==
Insignia	Rank	Date	Source
	SS-Sturmmann	1943	
	SS-Rottenführer	20 February 1943	
	SS-Unterscharführer	1943	
	SS-Standartenoberjunker	Summer 1944	
	SS-Untersturmführer der Reserve	21 June 1944	

== Awards and decorations ==
- Knight's Cross of the Iron Cross (20 February 1943), as Geschützführer, 14. (Panzerjäger) Kompanie / SS-Freiwilligen-Legion "Nederland" / 170. Infanterie-Division / XXVI. Armee-Korps / 18. Armee / Heeresgruppe Nord
- Iron Cross, 2nd Class (4 February 1943) and 1st Class (10 February 1943)
- Infantry Assault Badge, in bronze and silver
- Wound Badge (1939), in black and silver
- Medaille Winterschlacht im Osten 1941/42 (Medal for the Winter Battle in the East 1941/42)
- Special Badge for the Single-Handed Destruction of a Tank, in silver

== Legacy ==
Historians and popular military-history writers have repeatedly identified Mooyman as the best-known Dutch member of the Waffen-SS, citing his status as the first non-German Knight's Cross recipient and the intensity of the wartime propaganda built around him. His life is frequently cited in Dutch-language historical literature on wartime collaboration as a case study in the recruitment and subsequent propaganda use of foreign SS volunteers.

== See also ==
- Dutch collaboration with Nazi Germany
- List of Knight's Cross of the Iron Cross recipients (M)
