= Šics =

Šics (feminine: Šica) is a Latvian surname of German origin (from German surname Schütz). Individuals with the surname include:

- Andris Šics (born 1985), Latvian luger
- Guntis Sics, Australian sound engineer
- Juris Šics (born 1983), Latvian luger, brother of Andris
