= Rottenführer =

Nazi Party paramilitary rank

- SS gorget patches

- Waffen-SS Shoulder and sleeve insignia
- Country: Germany
- Service branch: Hitler Youth; National Socialist Motor Corps; National Socialist Flyers Corps; Schutzstaffel; Sturmabteilung
- Abbreviation: Rottenf
- Formation: 1932
- Abolished: 1945
- Next higher rank: Scharführer (SA); Unterscharführer (SS)
- Next lower rank: Sturmmann
- Equivalent ranks: Obergefreiter

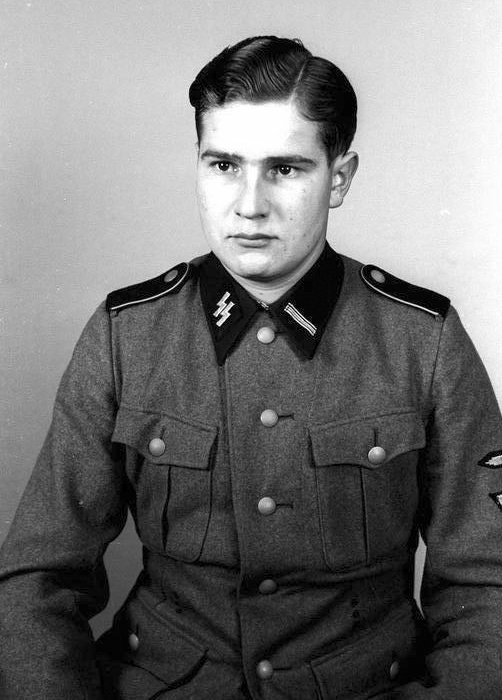
An SS-Rottenführer serving at the Mauthausen-Gusen concentration camp.

Rottenführer (German: [ˈʁɔtn̩fyːʁɐ], lit. 'section leader') was a Nazi Party paramilitary rank that was first created in the year 1932. The rank of Rottenführer was used by several Nazi paramilitary groups, among them the Sturmabteilung (SA), the Schutzstaffel (SS) and was senior to the paramilitary rank of Sturmmann.

The insignia for Rottenführer consisted of two double silver stripes on a bare collar patch. On field grey SS uniforms, the sleeve chevrons of an Obergefreiter (senior lance-corporal) were also worn.

== Creation ==
Rottenführer was first established in 1932 as an SA rank due to an expansion of the organisation requiring a greater number of enlisted positions. Since early SS ranks were identical to the ranks of the SA, Rottenführer became an SS rank at the same time.

Rottenführer was the first SS and SA position to have command over other paramilitary troops. They commanded a Rotte (English: team, equal to a squad or section) usually numbering no more than five to seven persons. A Rottenführer, in turn, answered to a Scharführer.

After 1934, a restructure of SS ranks made Rottenführer junior to the new rank of SS-Unterscharführer, although in the SA the rank continued to rate immediately below that of Scharführer.

== Uses ==
Final ranks to enlisted men until 1945
Waffen-SS	Heer (Army)	Luftwaffe (Air Force)	Kriegsmarine (Navy)
SS-Schütze	Schütze	Flieger	Matrose
SS-Oberschütze	Oberschütze	Flieger	Matrose
SS-Sturmmann	Gefreiter		Matrosengefreiter
SS-Rottenführer	Obergefreiter		Matrosenobergefreiter
No equivalent		Hauptgefreiter	Matrosenhauptgefreiter
No equivalent	Stabsgefreiter		Matrosenstabsgefreiter
No equivalent			Matrosenoberstabsgefreiter

Within the Waffen-SS, Rottenführer was considered equivalent to an Obergefreiter in the German Wehrmacht. For pay purposes, a Rottenführer with more than five years of service was administratively known as Rottenführer (2. Gehaltsstufe) ('2nd salary level') and paid the same rate as an army Stabsgefreiter. There was no difference in the Rottenführer insignia and the Gehaltsstufe designation was only used in written correspondence and never in verbal addressing of rank.

While having command over some troops, a Rottenführer in the Waffen-SS was not considered a non-commissioned officer rank.

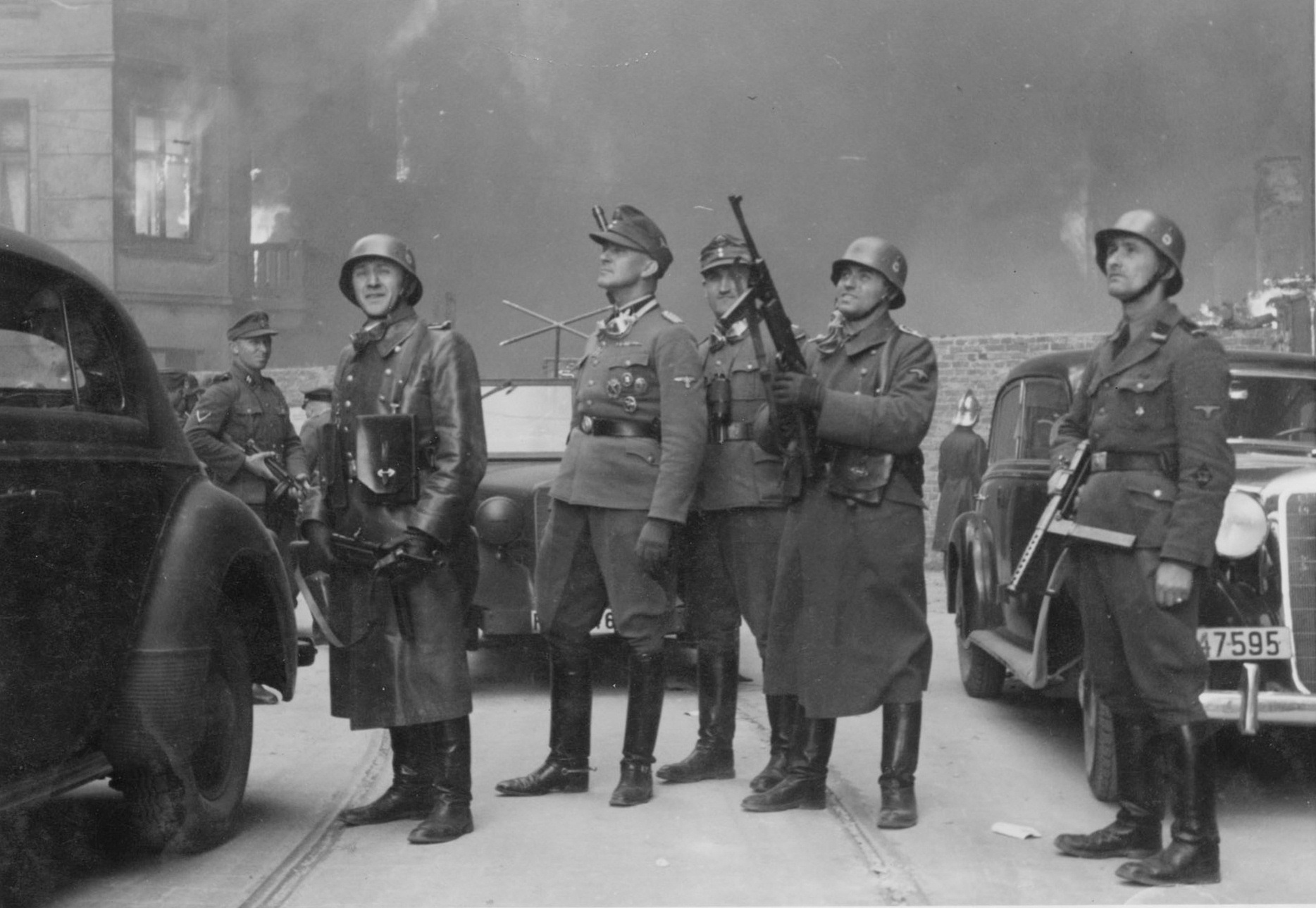
Taken during the 1943 Warsaw Ghetto Uprising. The SS (and also SD) Rottenführer Josef Blösche on right.

Those aspiring for promotion above Rottenführer were required to pass a promotion evaluation and combat skills assessment, during which time the Rottenführer was known by the title Unterführer-Anwärter (English: junior leader candidate). Waffen-SS Rottenführer also had the option to pursue an officer's commission through appointment as Junker FA.

Rottenführer was also a rank of the Hitler Youth where the position was considered a junior squad leader title. A rank of Oberrottenführer also existed in the Hitler Youth.

== Insignia ==
SS Gorget patches

SS Sleeve badge

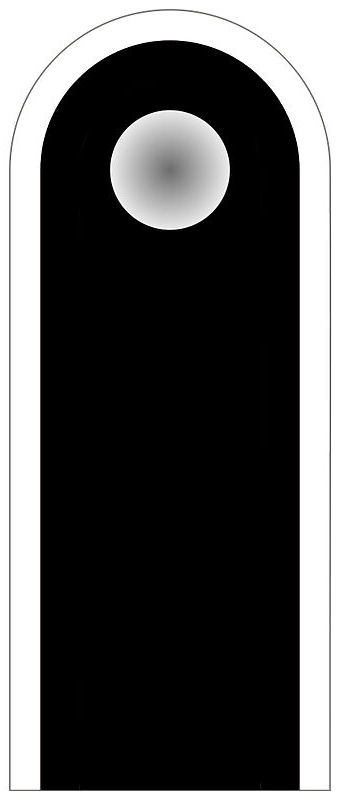
Shoulder strap (insignia)
(all other enlisted ranks OR-1 to OR-3 of the Waffen-SS)

HJ Shoulder strap

HJ Oberrottenführer Shoulder strap

NSFK Gorget patches

NSKK Gorget patch

SA Gorget patch

== See also ==
- Table of ranks and insignia of the Waffen-SS

== Bibliography ==
- Flaherty, T. H. (2004) [1988]. The Third Reich: The SS. Time-Life Books, Inc. ISBN 1-84447-073-3.
- McNab, Chris (2009). The SS: 1923–1945. Amber Books Ltd. ISBN 978-1-906626-49-5.
- McNab, Chris (2009b). The Third Reich. Amber Books Ltd. ISBN 978-1-906626-51-8.
- Mollo, Andrew (1992). Uniforms of the SS, Collected Edition Vol. 6. Windrow & Greene. ISBN 1-872004-67-9.

Junior Rank; Sturmmann	SS rank Rottenführer	Senior Rank; Unterscharführer
Junior Rank; Sturmmann	SA rank Rottenführer	Senior Rank; Scharführer
Junior rank Gefreiter	Rank Wehrmacht (Heer); Obergefreiter	Senior rank Unteroffizier
