= Schutz =

Schutz (German: shelter, protection) is a German surname, related to Schütz (which needs to be spelled Schuetz without umlaut ü). Notable people with the surname include:

- Alfred Schutz (1899–1959), Austrian phenomenological philosopher and sociologist
- Bernard F. Schutz (born 1946), physicist
- Björn Schutz (born 1971), Dutch politician
- Dana Schutz (born 1976), painter in New York
- Guillermo Schutz (born 1980), Mexican sports announcer
- Herbert Schutz (1937-2018), German-born Canadian philologist
- Katelin Schutz, physicist and cosmologist
- Maurice Schutz (1866–1955), French actor
- Michael Schutz (professor), American-Canadian professor of music cognition
- Peter W. Schutz (1930–2017), Porsche manager
- Roger Louis Schutz-Marsauche (Frère Roger, 1915–2005)
- Susan Polis Schutz (born 1944), American poet
- William Schutz, psychologist in the 1960s

== See also ==
- Schutzjude, an old status for German Jews
- Schutzwald, protection forest (Switzerland)
- Schütz
- Schütze
