= Schütz =

Schütz (also spelled Schuetz without Umlaut ü) is a German surname, deriving from Schütze (shooter/marksman). Notable people with the surname include:

== People ==
- Alfred Schütz (1899–1959), sociologist and philosopher
- Antal Schütz (1880–1953), Hungarian Piarist friar and prominent theologian
- Caspar Schütz (1540–1594), German historian
- Christian Gottfried Schütz (1747–1832), German humanist scholar
- Christoph Schütz (1689–1750), German pietist writer and songbook publisher
- David Schütz (1941–2017), Israeli writer
- Felix Schütz (born 1987), German ice hockey player
- Franz Schütz (1900–1955), German footballer
- Friedrich Schütz (1844–1908), Austrian journalist
- Günther Schütz (1912–1991), German military intelligence (Abwehr) agent during World War II
- Heinrich Schütz (1585–1672), German composer and organist
- Ignaz Schütz (1867–1927), Czech–German mathematician and physicist
- Johan Christher Schütz, Swedish songwriter and music producer
- Josef Schütz, or Schuetz, (1921–2023), Lithuanian-German Nazi concentration camp guard
- Katharina Schütz (later Katharina Zell; 1497–1562), German Protestant apologist
- Klaus Schütz (1926–2012), German Social Democratic Party (SPD) politician
- Michael Schütz (composer) (born 1963), German church musician
- Morgan Schuetz (born 1994), All-American middle-distance runner
- Steffen Schütz (born 1966), German politician
- Tales Schütz (born 1981), Polish football striker of German and Brazilian descent
- Tom Schütz (born 1988), German footballer
- Udo Schütz (born 1937), German entrepreneur and former race car driver
- Guillermo Schütz (born 1980), Mexican sports announcer
- Walter Schütz (1897–1933), German politician

== Other ==
- 4134 Schütz, a main-belt asteroid named after Heinrich Schütz

== See also ==
- Schütze
- Schutz
