= Stabsgefreiter =

Rank in the German Bundeswehr

- Heer shoulder and Marine sleeve insignia
- Country: Germany
- Service branch: German Army; German Navy; German Air Force
- Abbreviation: StGefr.
- Rank: German enlisted rank
- NATO rank code: OR-4
- Non-NATO rank: E-4
- Formation: 1846 (historic); 1957
- Next higher rank: Oberstabsgefreiter
- Next lower rank: Hauptgefreiter

Stabsgefreiter (abbr. StGefr, on lists SG) is the second highest rank of enlisted men in the German Bundeswehr, which might be comparable to Corporal (OR-4) in Anglophone armed forces.

== History ==
In the 19th century German Army the Gefreiter (plural: Gefreite) always belonged to the rank group of enlisted men (below noncommissioned (NCO) level). However, during training and fatigue duty Gefreite were competent, authorized, and tasked to act on behalf of NCOs. So Gefreite became the first superior rank above the lowest-level privates. Nevertheless, until 1853 there were no special rank insignia for Gefreiter. In contrast, from 1811 to 1853 the Vize-Unteroffizier (deputy sergeant) wore the NCO Portepee (sword-knot).

In 1846 the rank of Obergefreiter (transl. 1st/Senior Gefreiter) was introduced. This rank was shown by the so-called sergeant's button on the collar and the NCO Portepee on the sword. From 1853 to 1919 promotion to Obergefreiter was suspended with the exception of the Fussartillerie (foot artillery).

In the early German Reichswehr the ranks of Gefreiter and "Obergefreiter" were both indicated by one identical horizontal 9 mm Tressenstreifen" (lace stripe) on both upper arms of the uniform jacket.

Regarding regular 12 years duty time from 1921 onwards, the newly introduced ranks of enlisted men (Oberschütze (1st/Senior rifleman) and Stabsgefreiter (Staff Gefreiter) were indicated by angular cuff chevrons on the left upper arm. The sequence of ranks of enlisted men was now as follows:

Stabsgefreiter Wehrmacht

Final ranks to enlisted men until 1945
Waffen-SS	Heer (Army)	Luftwaffe (Air Force)	Kriegsmarine (Navy)
SS-Schütze	Schütze	Flieger	Matrose
SS-Oberschütze	Oberschütze	Flieger	Matrose
SS-Sturmmann	Gefreiter		Matrosengefreiter
SS-Rottenführer	Obergefreiter		Matrosenobergefreiter
No equivalent		Hauptgefreiter	Matrosenhauptgefreiter
No equivalent	Stabsgefreiter		Matrosenstabsgefreiter
No equivalent			Matrosenoberstabsgefreiter

== National People's Army ==
In the GDR National People's Army the rank Stabsgefreiter was used until 1990. The equivalent of the Volksmarine was Stabsmatrose.

See also main articles

- Comparative ranks of Nazi Germany
- Ranks of the National People's Army

== Bundeswehr ==
rank insignia field- and battle dress

Heer

Luftwaffe

Marine

A soldier of the German Bundeswehr might be promoted from OR1 Soldat (en: private) to Stabsgefreiter OR4b after a regular service time of 36 months.

Junior rank Hauptgefreiter (OR3a)	(German enlisted men rank); Stabsgefreiter	Senior rank Oberstabsgefreiter (OR4a)

== See also ==
- Ranks and insignia of NATO armies enlisted
