= Soldat (rank) =

German military rank

Soldat is the lowest rank of enlisted men in the armies of some countries. In the land-based armed forces of Germany, Austria, Ukraine, and Switzerland it is usually grouped as OR-1 ([zɔlˈdaːt] short: S, plural Soldaten) within the NATO ranking system, excluding the Swiss armed services which does not follow NATO standards.

== Germany ==
Soldat
- Heer and Luftwaffe shoulder insignia
- Country: Germany
- Service branch: German Army; German Air Force
- Abbreviation: S
- Rank: German enlisted rank
- NATO rank code: OR-1
- Formation: 1955
- Next higher rank: Gefreiter
- Next lower rank: None
- Equivalent ranks: Matrose

The German term Soldat (equivalent to Soldier in English) has its roots as far back as the 16th-century, where it was a common designation for a paid or remunerated ordinary-rank member of a military infantry, especially one who was not an officer. In the German language Sold implies "pay", and as such the term Soldat designated a person in pay (being paid) for providing armed service.

=== Bundeswehr ===
In the Federal armed forces of Germany (Bundeswehr) it can be the collective term to any person in uniform, e.g. Officers (de: Offiziere), Non-Commissioned Officers (de: Unteroffiziere), and enlisted men (de: Mannschaften).

In the Bundeswehr it is used to describe conscripts (de: Wehrpflichtiger), short/long term serving volunteers (de: Zeitsoldat, or Soldat auf Zeit), and career or regular servicemen (de: Berufssoldat).

It is grade A3 in the pay rules of the Federal Ministry of Defence.

The sequence of ranks (top-down approach) in that particular group is as follows:

- OR-4: Oberstabsgefreiter
- OR-4: Stabsgefreiter
- OR-3: Hauptgefreiter
- OR-3: Obergefreiter
- OR-2: Gefreiter
- OR-1: Soldat (Army, Air Force, Navy)

| Preceded by junior rank None | (German enlisted rank) 'Soldat' | Succeeded by senior rank Gefreiter |

=== Designation ===
The designation of the particular OR1-rank depends on the individual branch and career of the soldier as regulated in the Zentrale Dienstvorschrift 14/5. The sole OR1-rank designation in the Marine is Matrose, and Sanitätssoldat in the Bundeswehr medical service. Other OR1-designations are described in the table below.

| Rank designation | Abbrev. | Carrier grout (e.g.) |
|---|---|---|
| Flieger | Flg | Luftwaffe uniformed personnel with the lowest OR1-rank, with exception of Flugabwehrraketengeschwader 1; soldiers of the lowest OR1-rank in the units of the Heeresfliegertruppe |
| Funker | Fu | soldiers with the lowest OR1-rank: in the Signal Corps, not involved to units of tactical combat forces like Armoured Corps; of the Heer in stationary communications centers; in signal units of the Electronic Warfare; in units of the Operational Communications |
| Grenadier | Gren | Heer uniformed personnel with the lowest OR1-rank serving in the Wachbataillon beim Bundesministerium der Verteidigung since 1991 (until 1991 Jäger) |
| Jäger | Jg | soldiers with the lowest OR1-rank in the units of Jägertruppe, Fallschirmjägertruppe and Gebirgsjägertruppe |
| Kanonier | Kan | soldier with the lowest OR1-rank: of the Artillery Corps (except Panzerhaubitze units); in the Flugabwehrraketengeschwader 1 of the Luftwaffe; of the Geo-Information Service belonging to the Heer |
| Matrose | Matr | German Navy uniformed personnel with the lowest OR1-rank |
| Panzerfunker | PzFu | soldiers with the lowest OR1-rank of signal troops, integrated to units of the Armoured Corps |
| Panzergrenadier | PzGren, PG | soldier with the lowest OR1-rank in units of the Panzergrenadiertruppe; Panzergrenadier is also the collective name to all personnel of the Panzergrenadiertruppe |
| Panzerjäger | PzJg | This OR1-rank was discontinued in line with the abolishment of the Panzerjägertruppe (Anti-tank troops) in 2006.: from 1955 to 2006 it was the lowest OR1-rank of the Panzerjägertruppe; Panzerjäger was also the collective name for all Panzerjägertruppe personnel |
| Panzerkanonier | PzKan | soldier with the lowest OR1-rank of Artillery Corps batteries equipped with armored self-propelled howitzers (de: Panzerhaubitze) |
| Panzerpionier | PzPi | soldier with the lowest OR1-rank of Panzerpionier units (en: Armored engineer); Panzerpionier is also the collective name to all persons in uniform of the Bundeswehr Panzerpionier companies / Panzerpionier battalions |
| Panzerschütze | PzSchtz | soldier with the lowest OR1-rank of units of the Panzertruppe (en: Armoured corps) |
| Pionier | Pi | soldier with the lowest OR1-rank of Pioniertruppe (en: Combat engineering), with the exception of armored engineer units; Pionier is also the collective name for all Pioniertruppe personnel |
| Sanitätssoldat | SanSdt | soldier with the lowest OR1-rank in the Joint Medical Service (Germany) or the Heer medical service; Sanitätssoldat is also the collective name for personnel of the Sanitätsdienst der Bundeswehr (en: Bundeswehr Medical Service) |
| Schütze | Schtz | Normally all military personnel with the lower OR-1 rank serving in Heer that is not mentioned above. |

=== Wehrmacht until 1945 ===
Final ranks to enlisted men until 1945
| Waffen-SS | Heer (Army) | Luftwaffe (Air Force) | Kriegsmarine (Navy) |
|---|---|---|---|
| SS-Schütze | Schütze | Flieger | Matrose |
| SS-Oberschütze | Oberschütze | Flieger | Matrose |
| SS-Sturmmann | Gefreiter | | Matrosengefreiter |
| SS-Rottenführer | Obergefreiter | | Matrosenobergefreiter |
| No equivalent | | Hauptgefreiter | Matrosenhauptgefreiter |
| No equivalent | Stabsgefreiter | | Matrosenstabsgefreiter |
| No equivalent | | | Matrosenoberstabsgefreiter |

== Ukraine ==
Soldat is the lowest rank of the Ukrainian Ground Forces, Marine Corps, and Air Force. It was introduced in 1991, replacing the former rank of private.

== Mali ==
Soldat is the lowest rank of the Malian Army, Air Force, and the Service de Sante (Service of Health).

== See also ==
- Soldat (Romania)
- Ranks of the German Bundeswehr
- Rank insignia of the German Bundeswehr
- Ranks and insignia of NATO armies enlisted
- Ranks and insignia of enlisted personnel in NATO air forces
