= Michael Schutz (professor) =

Music psychology professor

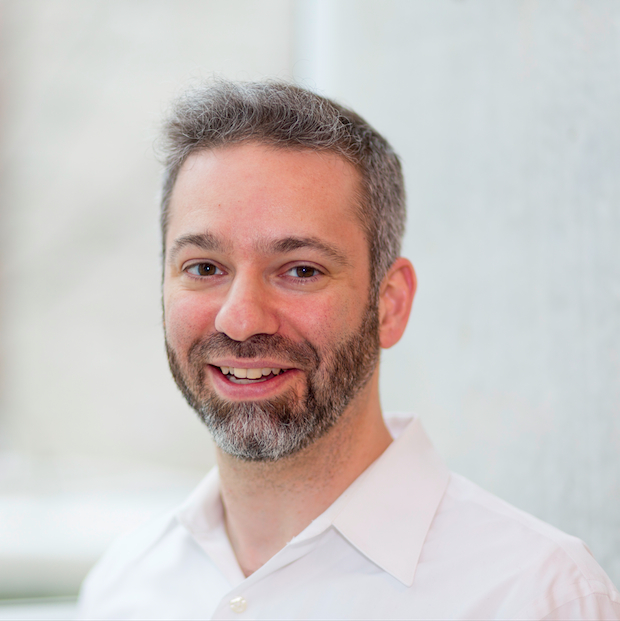
- Dr. Michael Schutz after receiving the University Scholar award (2019).
- Born: April 9 Alexandria, Virginia
- Education: Pennsylvania State University Northwestern University University of Virginia
- Awards: Penn State School of Music Alumni Award (2019), University Scholar (2019), Petro Canada Young Innovator Award (2014), Ontario Early Researcher Award (2011)
- Scientific career
- Fields: Music cognition, multi-sensory integration, emotion, auditory perception, auditory interfaces, sensorimotor integration, rhythm, percussion
- Workplaces: McMaster University
- Thesis: Crossmodal Integration: The search for unity
- Doctoral advisor: Michael Kubovy
- Other academic advisors: Michael Kubovy, Scott Lipscomb, Michael Burritt, Dan Armstrong, Gifford Howard, Randy Eyles
- Website: https://michaelschutz.com/ https://maplelab.net/

Michael Schutz is professor of music cognition and percussion at McMaster University. He is President-elect of the Society for Music Perception and Cognition (SMPC), and co-founder of the Canadian Percussion Network. He received his Master of Music in music technology and percussion performance for studying the role of visual stimuli in musical performance from Northwestern University in 2004. In 2007 he received a Master of Arts in psychology and later (2009) a Ph.D. in experimental psychology from University of Virginia studying cross modal integration under the supervision of Dr. Michael Kubovy. His most recent research interests include auditory alarms and the emotional perception of music as Director of the MAPLE Lab. He has over 60 articles available on Google Scholar. His 2021 TEDx talk "Death By Beep" reviews one aspect of his ongoing research on applying musical insights into improving the design of medical device alert sounds.

In 2019 Dr. Schutz was appointed secretary of the Society for Music Perception and Cognition. Other accolades include the Penn State School of Music Alumni Award, the McMaster University Scholar Award, and becoming an Elected Fellow of the Psychonomic Society. He has also made media appearances on The Nature of Things, Quirks and Quarks, CHCH, and in many written articles. His YouTube channel and professional website contain more information.
