= Obergefreiter =

German and Swiss military rank

- Heer shoulder and Marine sleeve insignia
- Country: Germany
- Service branch: German Army; German Navy; German Air Force
- Abbreviation: OGefr.
- Rank: German enlisted rank
- NATO rank code: OR-3
- Formation: 1955
- Next higher rank: Hauptgefreiter
- Next lower rank: Gefreiter

Obergefreiter (abbr. OGefr.) is an enlisted rank of the German and Swiss militaries which dates from the 19th century.

In today's Bundeswehr, every Gefreiter is normally promoted Obergefreiter after six months. The NATO-Code is OR-3 which would make Obergefreiter the equivalent to private / airman / seaman first class in most forces or, e.g., lance corporal in the Australian/New Zealand Forces. Like all enlisted personnel in the German Bundeswehr, soldiers of this rank have no military authority over lower ranking enlisted personnel (for instance Schütze or Gefreiter), except given by a higher rank.

In the Bundeswehr the lower rank is Gefreiter while the next rank is Hauptgefreiter. The lower rank in the Swiss Army is also Gefreiter; the next rank is Korporal.

== History ==
The rank was only used in the German army's heavy artillery branch (Fußartillerie) before 1919 and commonly established with the founding of the Reichswehr. Translated as "senior lance-corporal", in World War II the rank was normally given to soldiers who had command over small squads or to those soldiers who held the rank of Gefreiter and below. Soldiers that had performed a significant feat of achievement were given this title. An Obergefreiter was considered an Enlisted Man in the German Wehrmacht, equivalent to the Schutzstaffel's Sturmmann.

A somewhat large portion of the German Army in the Second World War consisted of enlisted men, especially during the later years of the war with conscription laws being increased to fight off the advancing Soviet Army. Of the 13 million soldiers in Germany's fighting force, 7.5 million were enlisted men, with 2.2 million of the enlisted men being Obergefreiters.

Final ranks to enlisted men until 1945
Waffen-SS	Heer (Army)	Luftwaffe (Air Force)	Kriegsmarine (Navy)
SS-Schütze	Schütze	Flieger	Matrose
SS-Oberschütze	Oberschütze	Flieger	Matrose
SS-Sturmmann	Gefreiter		Matrosengefreiter
SS-Rottenführer	Obergefreiter		Matrosenobergefreiter
No equivalent		Hauptgefreiter	Matrosenhauptgefreiter
No equivalent	Stabsgefreiter		Matrosenstabsgefreiter
No equivalent			Matrosenoberstabsgefreiter

== Swiss Armed Forces ==
Obgfr Swiss Armed Force

In the Swiss Armed Forces the rank of Obergefreiter (short: Obgfr) was introduced after a long debate on 1 January 2004. They are specialists, who take over tasks of responsibility or hold the position of a group commander.
