= Oberschütze =

German military rank

- Army and SS insignia
- Country: Kingdom of Bavaria; Weimar Republic; Nazi Germany
- Service branch: Bavarian Army; Reichsheer; German Army; Schutzstaffel
- Formation: 1920
- Abolished: 1945
- Next higher rank: Gefreiter (Army); Sturmmann (SS)
- Next lower rank: Soldat (Army); Schütze (SS)

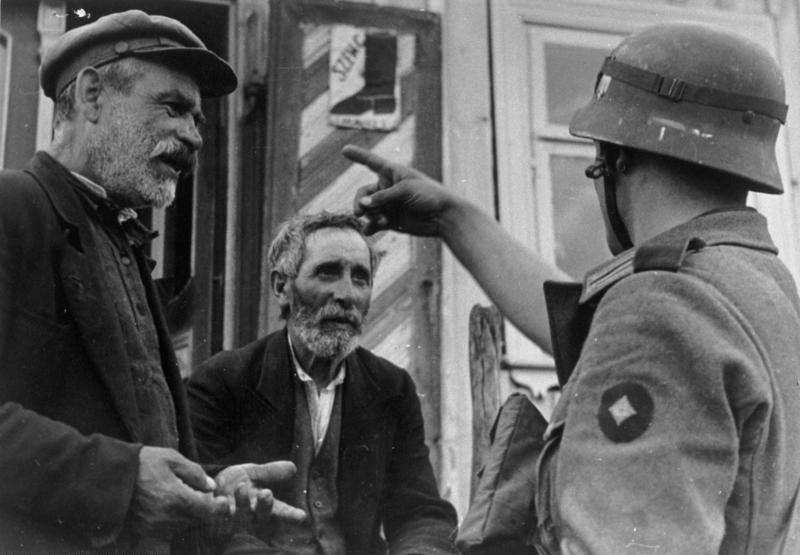
1941, Lithuania: An Oberschütze talks to two elderly Jewish men.

Oberschütze (German pronunciation: [ˈoːbɐˌʃʏtsə]; lit. 'Senior rifleman') was a German military rank first used in the Bavarian Army of the late 19th century.

== Usage ==
The rank and its equivalents (Oberkanonier, Oberpionier etc.) were generally introduced into the German Reichswehr around 1920 and continued to be used in its successor, the Wehrmacht, until 1945, with the exception of the period from October 1934 to October 1936, during which no promotions to this rank took place. In Nazi Germany's Kriegsmarine (navy), there was no equivalent for this particular rank grade. The use of Oberschütze and its equivalents reached its height during the Second World War when the Wehrmacht maintained the rank in both the German Army (Heer) and the ground forces branch of the air force (Luftwaffe).

The rank of Oberschütze and its specific unit type equivalents (Oberkanonier, Obergrenadier from 1942, Oberpionier, Oberfahrer, Oberfunker, etc.) was created to give recognition and rank promotion to those enlisted soldiers who had achieved or displayed an above-average aptitude and proficiency but would not, however, qualify for promotion to the Gefreiter rank. Consideration for promotion to the rank of Oberschütze could usually be achieved after six months to one year of military service.

In the militaries of other nations, Oberschütze was considered the equivalent of a private first class.

Final ranks to enlisted men until 1945
Waffen-SS	Heer (Army)	Luftwaffe (Air Force)	Kriegsmarine (Navy)
SS-Schütze	Schütze	Flieger	Matrose
SS-Oberschütze	Oberschütze	Flieger	Matrose
SS-Sturmmann	Gefreiter		Matrosengefreiter
SS-Rottenführer	Obergefreiter		Matrosenobergefreiter
No equivalent		Hauptgefreiter	Matrosenhauptgefreiter
No equivalent	Stabsgefreiter		Matrosenstabsgefreiter
No equivalent			Matrosenoberstabsgefreiter

== See also ==
- Table of ranks and insignia of the Waffen-SS
- Original German: SS-Oberschütze

== Bibliography ==
- Flaherty, T. H. (2004) [1988]. The Third Reich: The SS. Time-Life Books, Inc. ISBN 1-84447-073-3.
- McNab, Chris (2009). The SS: 1923–1945. Amber Books Ltd. ISBN 978-1-906626-49-5.
