= German Army (1935–1945) =

Land forces of Nazi Germany (1935–1945)

- Deutsches Heer
- Helmet decal used by the German Army in the mid-1940s
- Founded: 1935; 91 years ago
- Disbanded: August 1946; 80 years ago (Note: The official dissolution of the Wehrmacht began with the German Instrument of Surrender of 8 May 1945. Reasserted in Proclamation No. 2 of the Allied Control Council on 20 September 1945, the dissolution was officially declared by ACC Law No. 34 of 20 August 1946.)
- Country: Germany
- Allegiance: Adolf Hitler
- Type: Army
- Size: Total served: 13,600,000
- Part of: Wehrmacht
- Headquarters: Maybach I, Wünsdorf
- Equipment: List of army equipment
- Engagements: Spanish Civil War (1936–1939); World War II (1939–1945)

Commanders
- Supreme Commander-in-chief: Adolf Hitler
- Commander-in-chief of the Army: See list
- Chief of the General Staff: See list

Insignia
- Unit flag

The German Army (German: Deutsches Heer, pronounced [ˈdɔʏtʃəs] [heːɐ̯]) was the land forces component of the Wehrmacht, (Note: Though "Wehrmacht" is often erroneously used to refer only to the Army, it also included the Kriegsmarine (Navy) and the Luftwaffe (Air Force).) the regular armed forces of Nazi Germany, from 1935 until it effectively ceased to exist in 1945 and then was formally dissolved in August 1946. During World War II, a total of about 13.6 million volunteers and conscripts served in the German Army.

Only 17 months after Adolf Hitler announced the German rearmament programme in 1935, the army reached its projected goal of 36 divisions. During the autumn of 1937, two more corps were formed. In 1938 four additional corps were formed with the inclusion of the five divisions of the Austrian Army after the annexation of Austria by Germany in March. During the period of its expansion under Hitler, the German Army continued to develop concepts pioneered during World War I, combining ground and air units into combined arms forces. Coupled with operational and tactical methods such as encirclements and "battle of annihilation", the German military managed quick victories in the two initial years of World War II, a new style of warfare described as Blitzkrieg (lightning war) for its speed and destructive power. The army was also extensively involved in war crimes, including complicity in the Holocaust, the mass death of Soviet prisoners of war, and reprisals against civilians in occupied territories, contradicting the postwar myth of the clean Wehrmacht.

== Structure ==
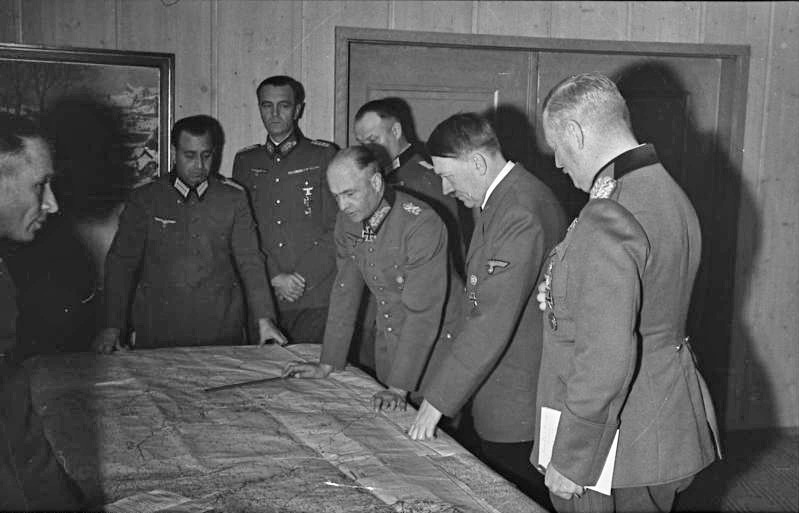
Adolf Hitler with Wilhelm Keitel, Friedrich Paulus, and Walther von Brauchitsch, October 1941

The Oberkommando des Heeres (OKH) was Nazi Germany's Army High Command from 1936 to 1945. As the Army was by far the largest and most important of the three branches of the German Armed Forces, Hitler was most anxious to control it directly from the outbreak of the war. Its headquarters in the field were always located in the immediate vicinity of the Führerhauptquartier. Following the failure of the Moscow offensive in December 1941, Hitler removed Walter von Brauchitsch as Commander-in-Chief of the Army (Oberbefehlshaber des Heeres) and took personal command. He had exercised this command ever since, resulting in a partial merging or overlapping of the functions of the OKW and the OKH. While still Chief of the OKW, Keitel also acted as Hitler’s executive officer in matters pertaining to the Army alone. Similarly, it was often difficult to distinguish between the de facto authority and functions of the Army General Staff and those of the Armed Forces Operations Staff.

Their notional organisation, however, remained unchanged. The OKH comprised twelve departments, each with overall responsibility for a specific aspect of the army. This was a very similar arrangement to that of other armies, except for the Army Administration Office (Heeresverwaltungsamt), which was responsible for procuring rations, billets, pay and clothing, but not munitions. This office was staffed by its own corps of technical and administrative specialists, whose careers were entirely separate from normal army personnel channels, and who were controlled by their own corps. These men, known as Wehrmachtbeamten, operated as a unified corps throughout the army and were attached to field units down to company level. They wore a uniform and were considered combatants — most front-line Beamten held an officer rank — and underwent basic infantry training. After May 1944, they lost some of their independence; promotion and transfers then became the responsibility of the Army Personnel Department.

=== Organisation of field forces ===
The Army (Heer) was divided into army groups (Heeresgruppe). During the course of the war there were thirteen army groups. Each group consisted of two or more field armies and was commanded by a field marshal general (Generalfeldmarschall) or a Colonel general (Generaloberst). The army group staff consisted of: a Chief of Staff (Chef des Generalstabes), 1st adjutant IIa Personnel administration (responsible for the officers), 2nd adjutant IIc Disciplinary and judicial affairs, 3rd general staff officer Ic (enemy situation and defense), 1st general staff officer Ia (operations), 4th general staff officer Id (training), 2nd general staff officer Ic, staff officer of artillery (Stabsoffizier der Artillerie “Stoart”), general of the engineers (General der Pioniere “Gen. d. Pi”), and an Army Group Intelligence Commander (Heeresgruppennachrichtenführer).

==== Infantry ====
A Field Army (Feldheer) 200,000 strong comprised two or three Corps and was usually commanded by a Colonel general. Its staff, between 1856 and 2686 personnel strong, consisted of: a Chief of Staff, 1st adjutant IIa, 2nd adjutant IIc, 3rd general staff officer Ic, 1st general staff officer Ia, 4th general staff officer Id, a Quartermaster-General (Oberquartiermeister) a senior artillery commander (Höherer Artilleriekommandeur) an army engineer commander (Armeepionierführer) and an intelligence officer (Armeenachrichtenführer).

A Corps 65,000 strong usually consisted of three divisions and a staff of 728 to 1004 staff personal. The corps was commanded by a “Kommandierender General” which normally was a Lieutenant-general (Generalleutnant). The staff consisted of the same personal except for the 4th general staff officer Id. The Infantry division, between 16,860 and 17,895 strong, consisted of three Regiments and was under the command of a Major-general (General major). The staff was similar to the corps staff but had a 2nd general staff officer Ic instead of a quartermaster and the Commander was the chief of staff.

The infantry battalion was the smallest tactical unit. (Note: The term battalion (german Bataillon) was not used. Instead a battalion was referred as Abteilung) Each battalion consisted of 860 officers and men plus 131 horses. By 1944 the strength of a battalion had decreased to 708 officers and men. The battalion included: A Battalion staff, three supply troops, an Intelligence unit, an Infantry engineer platoon, 3 rifle and 1 machine gun companies, and a pack train. The staff consisted of: the battalion commander who also was the chief of staff, originally an Oberstleutnant or Major, an adjutant, an assistant adjutant, a battalion surgeon, and a battalion veterinarian.

A Schützenkompanie (rifle company) initially 201 strong, comprised three Schützenzüge (rifle platoon) each 50 strong three antitank units, a supply train and a commissary unit. By 1944 the company was reduced to 142. The company was usually commanded by a captain or 1st lieutenant. During the course of the war a 2nd lieutenant could have been entrusted with the command due to the loss of higher officers.

The rifle platoon was the next lower unit, consisting of four Trupps (squads) 10 strong each. While the first platoon was under a 2nd lieutenant the second and third platoons were often commanded by a master sergeant or technical sergeant. The rifle squad was the smallest unit of the infantry. It consisted of a Gruppenführer (squad leader) either a Sergeant or Stabsgefreiter and nine riflemen, giving it a strength of one officer and nine men. The former separation between light machine-gun troops and rifle troops no longer existed. During the course of the war, this number naturally dropped, often to six or five men.

With the establishment of new infantry divisions, artillery weapons required for equipping them were transferred from existing regiments to the respective units. As it became clear that the artillery regiments in infantry divisions were not fulfilling their designated roles, a comprehensive reorganisation of the main divisional types was implemented. Light battalions were organised in the standard infantry formation, comprising two batteries of four 10.5 cm howitzers each, in addition to a light field gun battery comprising six 7.5 cm pieces and a heavy howitzer battalion armed with six 15 cm pieces. Additionally, adjustments were made to the war establishment of Gebirgsartillerie regiments and the artillery regiments of Panzer divisions.

==== Mountain Forces ====
The usual structure of a Gebirgs division in terms of armament, equipment and training comprised a headquarters, two rifle or Gebirgsjäger regiments, an artillery regiment, and the standard divisional services, including a battalion each of signallers, reconnaissance troops, anti-tank gunners, and engineers. Such a division had a nominal strength of 13,056 officers and men. The divisional train comprised strings of pack animals, usually distributed down to battalion level but able to be further subdivided to equip individual companies. The structure of a Gebirgs division meant that it was less flexible during military operations than a standard infantry division. This was because so much Gebirgs transport consisted of mule trains, leaving fewer cars and other vehicles available. There were 3,056 beasts of burden, and while the use of animals was satisfactory for mountain warfare, it was less so when the formation was operating in open country. There, the Gebirgs division was slow-moving due to the pace of its animals.

A standard Jäger regiment comprised a headquarters unit and three battalions, totalling 3,064 personnel. The regimental headquarters group included a signals platoon and a battery of heavy mountain guns. Each Jägerabteilung comprised an HQ, three rifle companies and a machine gun company, as well as anti-tank and heavy weapons detachments. An Abteilung had a strength of 877 personnel, broken down into 147 personnel in each rifle company and the remainder in the battalion HQ, machine gun company and heavy weapons company.

The artillery regiment comprised 2,330 officers and men and was equipped with twenty-four 7.5 cm guns and twelve 7.5 cm howitzers. It also had twelve 15 cm calibre howitzers and ten 10.5 cm calibre howitzers. There were fewer anti-tank guns in Gebirgs formations because it was considered unlikely that the Jäger would face enemy armour. Additionally, the weapons in the divisional arsenal had a shorter range than those used by a standard division because operations in the mountains took place at closer range than on flat terrain. Specialist groups were raised during the middle years of the war to support Gebirgs divisions undertaking special missions. These were high alpine (Hochgebirgs) battalions. Four such battalions were formed between July 1942 and November 1943. However, the military situation soon rendered them unnecessary, and they were disbanded and absorbed into standard Gebirgs formations.

==== Armored Forces ====
The Panzerdivision was the primary striking force of the German army during World War II. At the outbreak of the war, there were only five such divisions, but their number was expanded to ten by 1940, and by the war’s conclusion, the total had grown to 27. (Note: This excluded the Panzerdivision controlled by the Luftwaffe, and the seven of the SS.) Initially, the army’s Panzerdivisions were designed with two full tank regiments, comprising approximately 400 tanks, alongside a smaller infantry contingent and supporting units. However, most of these tanks were light models, primarily the Pzkw I and II, which were essentially armored vehicles equipped with machine guns or small-caliber cannons. Some divisions also included captured Czech tanks and a limited number of heavier vehicles.

The 1940 French campaign exposed weaknesses in the initial Panzerdivision structure, leading to a reorganization in 1940. This new structure consists of a single tank regiment, motorized infantry, and reinforced support units, with increased infantry components reflecting operational focus. The Divisional HQ supervised units, including communications, local defense, and reconnaissance. Infantry included motorized companies, heavy weapons, and engineers. Light armored car companies were attached. Infantry were transported in various vehicles, especially on the Eastern Front.

A tank regiment (Panzer Regiment) 1,661 strong consisted of three battalions, each of two companies of Type III battle tanks and a company of short-gunned Type IVs for close support work. It also had a reconnaissance troop of Type IIs attached to Battalion HQ. Later the allocation was changed to two battalions of four companies, one of 96 Type IV and one of 96 Panthers, often with a ninth company of Tiger tanks or assault guns; this latter addition was most frequently found in Russia and from 1944 on was not common, the heavy tanks being organised in separate units. Various SP anti-tank and AA guns were also included together with maintenance and repair units.

The Panzer Grenadier Brigade was composed of two mechanized and well-equipped infantry regiments, each typically made up of two Abteilungen (battalions). However, certain SS Divisions featured regiments with three Abteilungen, and in some cases, three full regiments. After 1940-41, efforts were made to mechanize one of the four Abteilungen in each brigade by mounting it in half-tracked armored personnel carriers, designating it as the "gepanzerte" (armored) battalion. This designation extended to its parent regiment, which was then referred to as "armored." The armored Abteilung was heavily equipped with mobile weaponry, including 2 cm anti-aircraft/anti-tank guns and up to twelve 7.5 cm self-propelled close-support guns. Each regiment also had its own engineer, anti-aircraft, and self-propelled infantry gun companies. Light anti-tank weapons were integrated directly into the infantry battalions, though these were rarely reflected in standardized organizational charts.

The Panzerjägerabteilung (anti-tank battalion), numbering around 484 personnel, consisted of three companies. Initially, these units were equipped with light 4.7 cm and 5 cm anti-tank guns mounted on outdated tank chassis, often supplemented with captured enemy weapons. Over time, these were replaced with standardized 7.5 cm anti-tank guns, typically mounted on long-barreled assault guns or specialized Jagdpanzer vehicles such as the Type III/IV. Some divisions were also allocated self-propelled or towed 8.8 cm guns, which were highly effective against both tanks and aircraft. In the later phases of the war, adjustments to equipment allocations reflected the increasingly defensive nature of German operations.

The division’s engineers (Pioniere) and signals units (Nachrichten) were integral components of its structure. The armored signals battalion was not a combat formation but played a critical role in maintaining communication across the division. In contrast, the armored engineer Abteilung was a combat-ready unit. It typically included two or three infantry companies, one of which was mounted in armored personnel carriers, while the others were motorized. The engineer battalion also maintained one or two bridging columns, often equipped with armored vehicles, as well as a light engineer column for various construction and demolition tasks.

The administrative services of the division were essential for maintaining operational readiness and included transport and supply companies, technical support units, commissariat staff, field police, and medical troops. These units ensured the effective delivery of supplies, repairs, and medical care, while also maintaining order within the division. Together, these components allowed the Panzer Grenadier Brigade to operate as a highly mobile and versatile force, capable of supporting both offensive and defensive operations in coordination with the division’s armored and artillery elements.

==== Artillery ====
With the exception of the 18th Artillery Division and the Artillery Divisions 309, 310, 311 and 312, there were no independent artillery divisions in the German army. The artillery was attached to an infantry division in regiments. At the begin of the war an artillery regiment consisted of an Regimental staff with staff battery, three light units, each with a staff battery, and three batteries of four light 10.5 cm field howitzers (FH 18) each, 36 in all one heavy unit with a staff battery and three batteries, each with four heavy 15 cm field howitzers (sFH 18), and supply trains. Each battery also had two light machine guns for anti-aircraft use and short-range securing. The total strength of an artillery regiment consisted of total 2872 officers and men, plus 2208 horses.

=== Replacement ===
Next to the Field Army was the Replacement Army (Ersatzheer) Its purpose was to train further soldiers, keep them in readiness, and send them to their respective field units to replace casualties. As a rule, the location of the replacement unit was the same Wehrkreis as the affiliated field unit. At the beginning of the war, each infantry regiment that took to the field left an Ersatzabteilung at its home station. This usually consisted of one or more companies.

- Reception company (Stammkompanie) with new recruits and cadre personnel.
- Training company (Ausbildungskompanie) responsible for training inducted volunteers.
- Transfer company (Marschkompanie) comprising pools of trained replacements ready to set off for their field units.
- Convalescent company (Genesungskompanie), comprising soldiers from reserve hospitals, preparing for return to their respective field units.

The replacement training units were subordinate to the Wehrkreis Headquarters (Wehrkreiskommandos) in their capacity as Deputy Corps Headquarters (Stellvertretende Generalkommandos, Stv.Gen.Kdo.) through the following intermediate staffs :These replacement training units were controlled in one of two ways. Firstly, they were controlled directly by one or more Replacement Division Staffs. This was the case for independent units of the supporting arms and services, such as reconnaissance, engineer and supply troop replacement training battalions. Secondly, they were controlled through several infantry, artillery and Panzer replacement training regimental staffs. Deputy corps commanders, who were commanders of replacement training units and of Wehrkreise, were subordinate to the Commander of the Replacement Army (Befehlshaber des Ersatzheeres). They were permitted to relocate units of the Replacement Army within their designated area, with the proviso that they were obliged to notify the Commander of the Replacement Army. In addition there was one field replacement unit accompanying each division into the field. The field replacement units were filled by drawing men from the divisional replacement unit and from stragglers, veterans of dissolved formations, and soldiers returned from field hospitals.

== Training and recruitment ==
Germany and the annexed Austria had been divided into 18 military districts (Wehrkreise) from which all men were recruited and trained. The districts were ordered to use the registration lists held by the police to start calling up all men who had reached the age of 20.

=== Examination ===
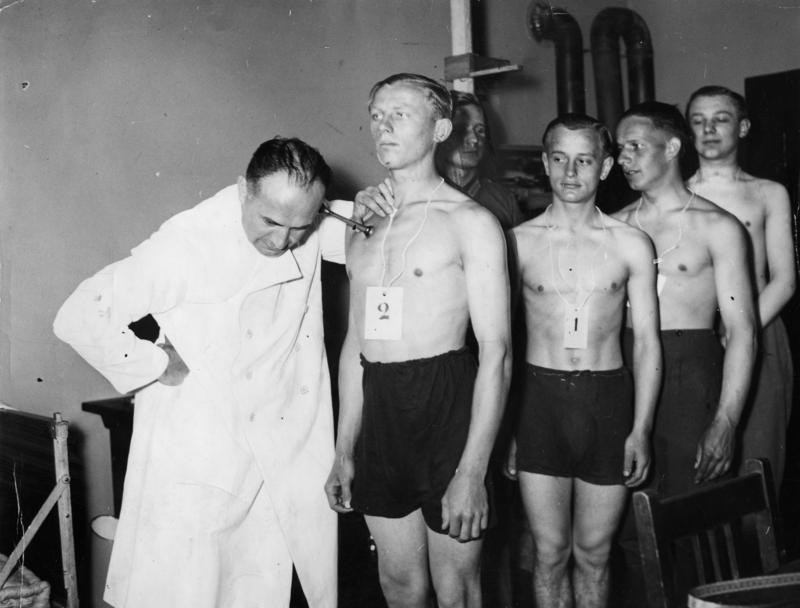
Examination of recruits

Soon after registration, the recruiting sub-area headquarters (Wehrbezirkskommando) issued orders for the first examination (Musterung) of registrants to be held. This was carried out by an examining board (Musterungsstab), which included representatives of the military authorities, the district and local police, the civilian administrative authorities (municipalities or rural districts) and the German Labour Service, as well as medical officers, according to local registration districts. During this examination, registrants were classified according to their physical fitness. The following categories had been used: fit for regular service (kriegsverwendungsfähig); fit for limited service in the field (bedingt kriegsverwendungsfähig); fit only for labour service (arbeitsverwendungsfähig); totally unfit (wehruntauglich); and temporarily unfit (zeitlich untauglich).

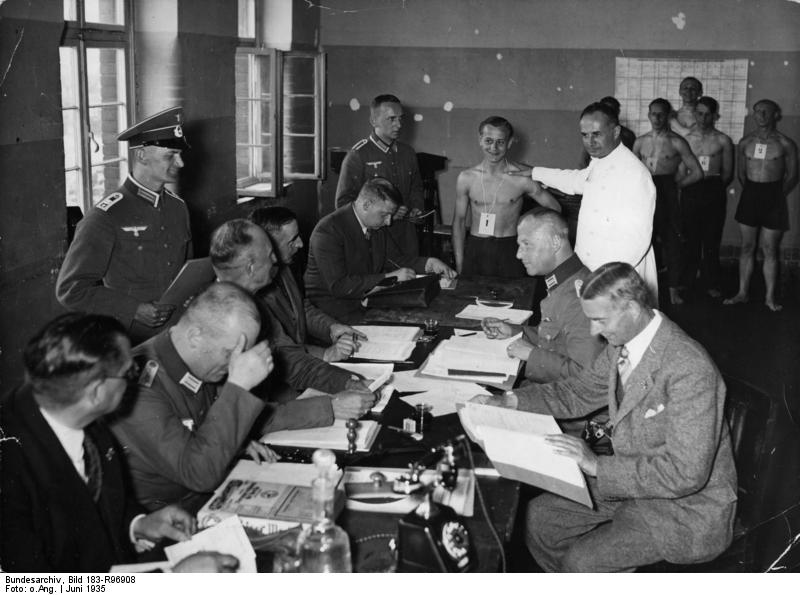
Examining board

The physical requirements to be drafted into the Wehrmacht as a soldier were generally clearly defined and were based on the requirements placed on an average soldier. These requirements included aspects such as height, weight, height-to-weight ratio, eyesight, hearing and the condition of the teeth. During the course of the Second World War, however, the criteria were increasingly relaxed, as the need for soldiers increased significantly as the war progressed.

At the beginning of the war (1939), a minimum body height of around 1.55 to 1.60 meters applied, depending on the branch of service. For infantrymen and other regular soldiers, an average height of 1.65 to 1.70 meters was aimed for. Taller and stronger men were preferred, especially for specialized units such as armoured troops or artillery. However, as the war progressed and manpower shortages increased, the minimum height was lowered to around 1.50 meters. The weight of the Wehrmacht soldier should be in a healthy proportion to his height. There were no rigid weight specifications, but a body mass index that indicated underweight or overweight could lead to deferment or rejection. At the beginning of the war, preference was given to men with a normal physique, as they were expected to perform better physically. Severe underweight or obesity was considered an exclusion criterion, unless the candidate could prove his fitness in another way.

Good eyesight and hearing were key requirements. Soldiers had to be able to see sufficiently in at least one eye without a visual aid; as a rule, vision of at least 50 percent in one eye was required. Spectacle wearers were not generally excluded; they could serve in non-combat positions, for example as typists or technicians. Hearing ability had to be good enough for the soldier to be able to hear commands and sounds over a certain distance without difficulty. Hearing loss or deafness in one ear was a common exclusion criterion, unless compensatory abilities were available.

=== Training ===
When recruits joined their regiment for initial training, they often came from the local region and were familiar with some members of their battalion or even the regiment. However, during the first 16 weeks of training, friendships were primarily limited to their immediate comrades. Recruits were assigned rooms based on their section (Korporalschaft), and they were introduced to their section commander, (Gefreiter), who would command their respect and instill discipline during duty. The recruits also encountered their platoon sergeant (a Feldwebel), and their platoon commander during brief appearances early in their training. The officer typically delivered a lecture on the role of the German Army within German society. At this point, recruits were officially prohibited from maintaining any political affiliations. This rule required members of the Nazi Party to form bonds with non-party members, regardless of personal preferences.

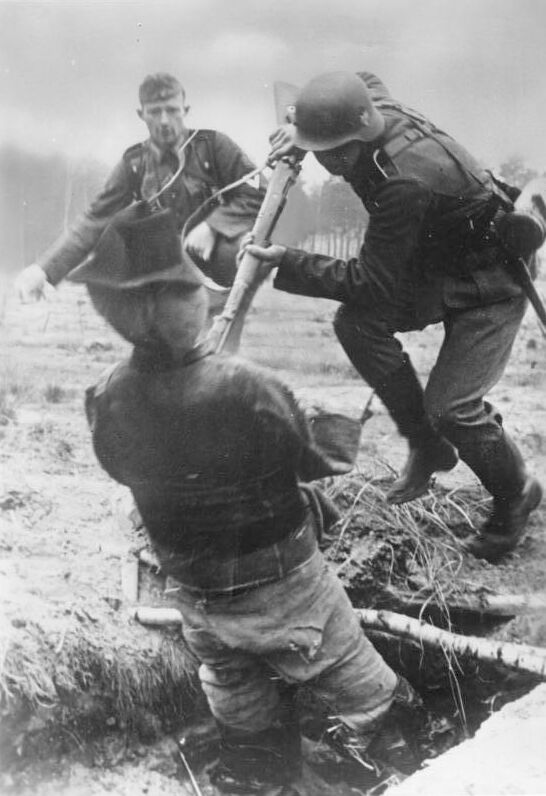
Grenadier practicing with the bayonet

The content and intensity of training varied depending on the depot or training facility. Some locations were notorious for extreme discipline, bordering on brutality, while others maintained a less severe but equally thorough approach. Each section was responsible for the cleanliness of its assigned room for the entire 16-week period. Recruits were issued their personal uniforms and equipment, received a strict haircut, and were fed their first military meal at around 6:00 PM. Following this, they attended an ideological lecture about the traditions and ethos of the German army and the history of their regiment. Recruits were instructed on how to properly wear their uniforms and were required to pack their civilian clothes, which would be sent back to their families the next day. From this point onward, they were officially soldiers, subject to military discipline. They were taught military customs, such as saluting indoors and outdoors, and were reminded to show respect to all senior members of the German army, which included almost everyone they encountered in their early training phase.

A typical day of training for recruits began at 5:00 AM, when corporals and soldiers responsible for barracks training would often physically rouse the men from their beds. The recruits were then required to strip their beds, organize their lockers, wash, shave, and dress before breakfast. Many mornings also involved training runs of increasing distance and speed, followed by washing and changing into uniform. Breakfast, consisting of coffee and bread, was scheduled for 6:45 AM, providing the men with about 15 minutes to eat. However, this meal was frequently unavailable, especially if the recruits were engaged in exercises or drills to correct mistakes from the previous day. Recruits quickly learned that hunger, exhaustion, and personal discomfort were considered insignificant and that they had to remain prepared for any situation at all times.

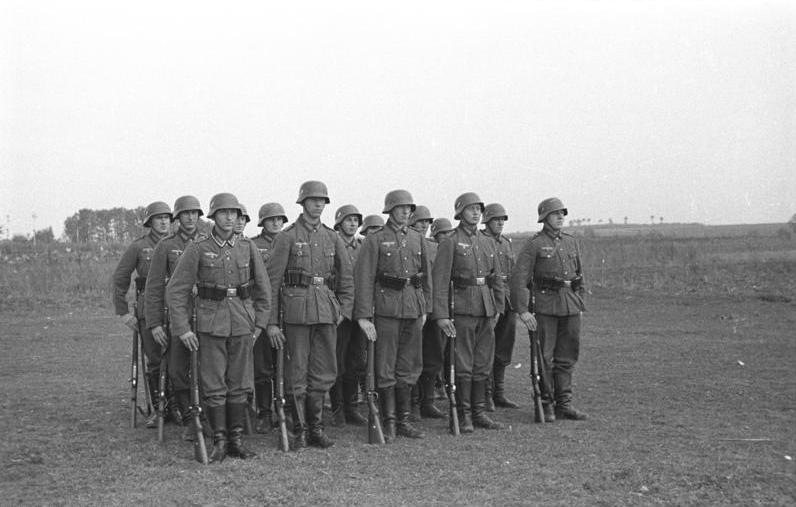
German soldiers at field training

Lectures were a regular part of the daily schedule. These covered topics such as the duties of a soldier toward his comrades, the role of the soldier in relation to the state, and the structure of the Nazi hierarchy. Battle training during lectures was minimal, as the German army placed emphasis on practical instruction in the field. Each training day was divided into morning and afternoon sessions. A typical morning might include a lecture followed by drill practice on the parade square, while the afternoon could feature physical training and shooting practice. When provided, lunch (Mittagessen), the main meal of the day, was served at 12:30 PM. At 1:30 PM, all recruits were assembled on the parade square for inspection and announcements. Initially, this parade was conducted by platoon sergeants. As training progressed, it was led by the company sergeant major, platoon commanders, the company adjutant, and eventually the company commander. Recruits interacted with their officers infrequently during training, as the focus was on preparing them to function independently at the section and platoon levels, without relying on the constant presence of officers who might not be available in battle.

Evenings were dedicated to cleaning duties, which included maintaining uniforms, equipment, rifles, machine guns, and the barracks room. The supper (Abendbrot) was served at 6:30 PM. Additional activities often extended the recruits' day well into the night, and as training advanced, nighttime exercises and drills became increasingly common. The German army divided training into two categories: field training and barracks training. Field training encompassed a range of practical skills essential for survival and combat, such as drill on the parade square, fieldcraft, weapons training, map reading, and other tactical exercises. Barracks training focused on personal hygiene, weapon maintenance, and routine chores like floor polishing, bed making, and other daily housekeeping tasks common to military life. These activities not only instilled discipline but also fostered camaraderie within sections, forging bonds that would endure into combat.

Recruits were provided with all the necessary clothing and equipment to perform their duties, but it was their personal responsibility to ensure everything was kept clean and in good condition. Replacements were issued when necessary, but only for items damaged during training or exercises. Proper care of boots was particularly emphasized, as poorly maintained or ill-fitting footwear could lead to severe foot injuries, which might result in a soldier falling out of formation—a serious matter with potentially harsh consequences. Foot injuries caused by negligence were treated as a disciplinary offense. Every morning, recruits were required to strip their beds to allow them to air, as maintaining hygiene in the barracks was a priority. Beds soaked with sweat needed to dry out before being remade in the early afternoon prior to roll call. Lockers were also subject to inspection and had to be kept tidy, though the German army did not adopt the extreme "spit-and-polish" standards of some other militaries. Cleanliness and order were essential, but soldiers were not expected to achieve a mirror-like shine on boots or millimeter-perfect bed arrangements.

The standard uniform for trainees was white, a color that quickly became impractical during training. Over time, repeated washing caused the material to fade to a yellow or grey hue. This uniform was completed with ankle boots, a belt, and a side cap. The difficulty in keeping the uniform clean for inspections reinforced the importance of personal accountability for cleanliness and appearance. Recruits were also responsible for their assigned room-cleaning tasks, further instilling discipline. Mistakes or lapses in discipline were met with swift and physically demanding punishments. Unlike some armies, where punishments might include menial tasks such as polishing dustbins or painting grass, the German army treated punishments as additional training opportunities. Common penalties included long runs in full field gear or practical exercises like crawling through muddy terrain, wading through streams, or performing other physically grueling tasks. These punishments were not only corrective but also reinforced the physical conditioning and endurance required for military life.

Obedience and discipline were further instilled through rigorous foot and rifle drills. Recruits spent many hours on the parade square during their 16-week training period, averaging around 30 drill sessions per week. These included muster parades and pre-meal parades. Rifle drill was not limited to ceremonial handling for parades but also covered tactical aspects, such as loading, unloading, ensuring safety, and cleaning the weapon. This comprehensive approach ensured that recruits developed both the discipline expected of soldiers and the practical skills needed for combat.

==== Special training ====
After completing their basic infantry training, recruits designated for the armored forces began specialized Panzer training. This training was conducted at several dedicated schools located in Wunsdorf-Zossen, Bergen, and Potsdam-Krampnitz. As the war progressed, additional specialization courses were introduced, including programs for Panther crews at the training grounds in Erlangen and for Tiger crews at the Paderborn training grounds. For much of the war, Non-Commissioned Officer training for tank crews was handled by the Feld-Unteroffizier-Schule near Warsaw in occupied Poland.

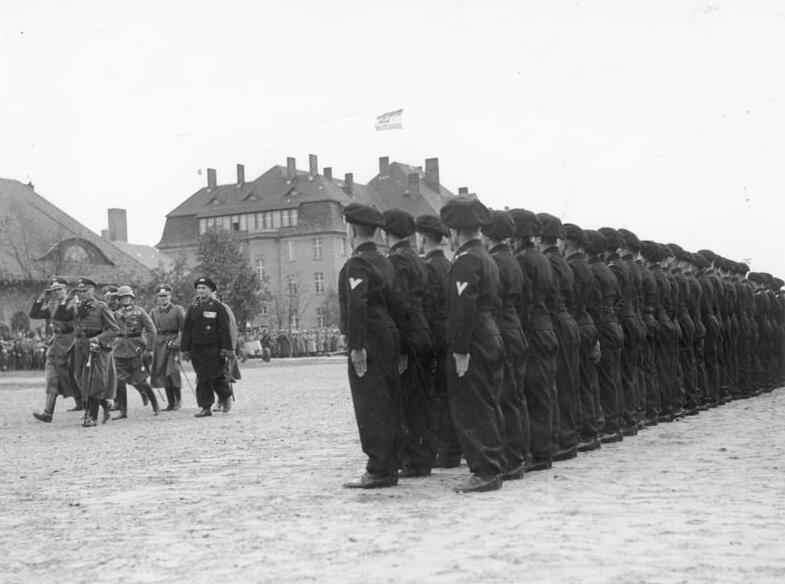
The armored forces move into their new base in Wünsdorf on 20.10.1935

Upon arrival at their assigned training post, recruits underwent an intense six-month period of infantry training, which also included practice with the standard German 37mm anti-tank gun of the time. Tank and anti-tank units were often trained together, with the aim of fostering a mutual understanding of each unit's roles and capabilities. This collaborative approach ensured that by the end of their training, both tank and anti-tank personnel were fully aware of how to complement and support each other in combat situations. Following this initial six-month phase, the recruits were divided into specialized groups. Approximately 45% of the trainees received specific instruction as anti-tank gun crew members, 40% were trained as vehicle drivers and mechanics, and the remaining 15% were taught as signalmen. Alongside this specialist training, recruits periodically resumed infantry training to maintain their foundational skills.

The training of officer candidates was overseen by the Fahnenjunker-Schule der Panzertruppen (Cadet School for Panzer Troops), located in Gross-Glienicke near Berlin. Additional courses for officer candidates were conducted at various Panzer training facilities in Gross-Glienicke, Ohrdruf, and Wischau. Advanced officer training took place at the Oberfähnrich-Schule der Panzertruppe (Officer Cadet School for Panzer Troops), also located in Gross-Glienicke and Wischau. Tank commanders were chosen from the most capable and skilled members of the trained tank crews, while platoon leaders (Zugführer) were selected from the best-performing commanders. This rigorous selection and training process ensured that leadership within the Panzer units was of the highest caliber.

==== Officer training ====
After the First World War, officer training in Germany was comprehensively reformed and extended under Hans von Seeckt. Candidates spent almost four years in training, starting with two years in the troops, followed by ten and a half months each at the infantry school and the weapons school. The focus remained on personal development, but more emphasis was placed on academic subjects. The curriculum included tactics, weapons technology, pioneer service, terrain studies, army organization, civic education, air defence, communications, and vehicle technology, theoretical physical education as well as hygiene and military administration. In the weapons school, some theoretical subjects were supplemented by military history and special subjects such as mathematics, physics, and chemistry, with military history being of great importance.

Until 1937, officer training in Germany was divided into three parts: basic training with the troops, officer school, and weapons school, followed by further service, with appointment as an officer taking place after about two years. Instruction at officer school became more practice-oriented, with more hours devoted to tactics and one hour of Nazi principles instead of civic instruction. After the start of the war, training was increasingly replaced by front-line service. Until the end of 1942, officer candidates underwent a combination of training and frontline service, but this had to be adjusted due to high casualties.

From the fall of 1942, proven soldiers without an original officer's career could also become officers on the recommendation of their commanders, whereby criteria such as leadership, personality and military performance were decisive. This made it possible for tens of thousands of non-commissioned officers and enlisted men to become officers during the war. During the course of the Second World War, formal training at the officer school was increasingly replaced by active service at the front. Until the end of 1942, future officers first underwent six months of training with the reserve army. They then served three months at the front, returned to the officer school for three months, served a further two to four months at the front, and were finally appointed officers after a total service period of 14 to 18 months.

==== General Staff Officer training ====
Until the middle of the Second World War, membership of the General Staff was the main route to preferential promotions and the rank of general in the German army. The General Staff was regarded as an exclusive elite with enormous prestige and influence. Before the First World War, selection for the War Academy was based on an annual examination in military and general subjects, with an emphasis on tactics. After 1920, the examination became compulsory for all officers in order to assess knowledge, personality and character. The three-year course at the War Academy aimed to train experts for operations, especially for the position of First General Staff Officer (Ia) of a division. The main subjects were tactics and military history, supplemented by staff work, army organization, enemy intelligence, supply, transport, and weapons technology. Non-military subjects such as foreign languages, foreign and domestic policy, and economics were taught in the third year in Berlin.

The training included lectures, exercises, seminars, independent work, planning, and war games as well as general staff trips to historical battlefields. In the summer, the participants were assigned to various branches of the armed forces to gain practical insights. The highlight was a two-week general staff trip with the simulation and detailed preparation of a major operation, which was also decisive for the final assessment. The selection of the general staff officers was based on intensive personal observation and assessment by the training managers, without a written final examination. Qualities such as intelligence, decision-making ability, creativity, resilience, and reliability were sought. After successfully completing the War Academy, graduates were initially assigned to the General Staff for one to two years on probation before being officially accepted.

The Kriegsakademie was closed at the beginning of the Second World War in 1939, as a short war was expected and general staff officers were in short supply. The three-year course was replaced by eight-week courses, which were strongly practice-oriented and focused on tactics, supplies, transportation, staff work, and enemy intelligence. Character and independent thinking remained key selection criteria, with around 80% of graduates being assessed as suitable. From 1942, as the demand for general staff officers continued to rise, the training was restructured. It comprised six months of practical training in the divisional staff, three months in a higher staff, eight weeks of training, and a further six-month probationary period, which took around 1.5 years in total. As the training often involved front-line operations, there were high casualties among the participants, reflecting the German belief that war itself was the best teacher.

== Nutrition ==
The Army High Command/Administration Office (OKH/Heeresverwaltungsamt) was responsible for overall planning of rations and the laying down of policies for the procurement and organisation of supplies. In accordance with the established policy, the army planned to forage for food in the territory it occupied. To this end, it confiscated or purchased food for men and animals wherever possible, using these foodstuffs to supplement or replace military rations. It is standard practice for an army to maintain a ten-day ration reserve for each soldier in its established strength. The daily ration (Portionsatz) comprised three meals, with breakfast accounting for one-sixth, lunch one-half, and evening meal one-third of the total daily amount. There were seven types of rations in total, comprising four normal rations (Verpflegungsätze) and two special rations.

- Type I Normal rations for troops engaged in combat, recovering from combat, or serving in extreme cold climates. 1.698 kilograms, plus 7 cigarettes
- Type II Normal rations for occupation forces and service or line of communication troops. 1.654 kilograms, plus six cigarettes.
- Type III Normal rations for garrison troops serving within Germany. 1.622 kilograms, plus three cigarettes.
- Type IV Normal rations for office-based personnel and all nurses serving within Germany. 1.483 kilograms, plus two cigarettes.
- Iron rations comprised biscuits (250 grams), preserved cold meat (200 grams), preserved vegetables (150 grams), coffee (25 grams) and salt (25 grams). The total weight of the ration was 650 grams, or 825 grams including packaging. Half iron rations were also issued, comprising biscuits (250 grams) and preserved cold meat (200 grams), weighing a total of 450 grams, or 535 grams inclusive of packaging. These were categorised as emergency rations and were typically held in reserve, being used only when ordered and when full rations were unobtainable.
- Combat ration High-energy and easily carried emergency rations issued to troops actively engaged in combat, usually made up of biscuits, chocolate bars, sweets and fruit bars, and cigarettes.
- March ration issued to troops in transit (on foot, by rail or vehicle-borne) comprised a cold ration of bread (700 grams), cold meat or cheese (200 grams), spreads (60 grams), coffee (9 grams) or tea (4 grams), sugar (10 grams) and cigarettes (6), with a total weight of 980 grams.

When fresh meat was on hand, divisional butchery platoons were able to process 40 beef cattle (40,000 meat rations), 80 pigs (24,000 meat rations) or 240 sheep (19,000 meat rations) per day. Meanwhile, field bakery companies had the capacity to produce between 15,000 and 19,200 bread rations per day. Wherever possible, meals were cooked centrally by horse-drawn wood-burning field kitchens (so-called Gulaschkanone) in non-mechanised units and by equivalent field cooking ranges mounted on trucks for Panzer and Panzergrenadier units. Field kitchens were categorised as either large (catering for 125-225 men) or small (catering for 50-125 men), with other types of field cooking equipment issued to units of less than 60 men.

== Doctrine ==
The German operational doctrine emphasized sweeping pincer and lateral movements meant to destroy the enemy forces as quickly as possible. This approach, referred to as Blitzkrieg, was an operational doctrine instrumental in the success of the offensives in Poland and France. Blitzkrieg has been considered by many historians as having its roots in precepts developed by Fuller, Liddel-Hart, and Hans von Seeckt, and even having ancient prototypes practised by Alexander the Great, Genghis Khan, and Napoleon. Recent studies of the Battle of France also suggest that the actions of either Erwin Rommel or Heinz Guderian or both of them (both had contributed to the theoretical development and early practices of what later became Blitzkrieg prior to World War II),ignoring orders of superiors who had never foreseen such spectacular successes and thus prepared much more prudent plans, were conflated into a purposeful doctrine and created the first archetype of Blitzkrieg, which then gained a fearsome reputation that dominated the Allied leaders' minds. Thus Blitzkrieg was recognised after the fact, and while it became adopted by the Wehrmacht, it never became the official doctrine nor got used to its full potential because only a small part of the Wehrmacht was trained for it and key leaders at the highest levels either focused on only certain aspects or even did not understand it.

== Tactics ==
The German General Staff policy during World War 2 focused on the offensive, with the defensive used for holding operations or a secure base for future offensives. This doctrine, known as the Blitzkrieg, dominated German military thinking until 1943. However, after the Russians and Allies stopped the German rush and reduced air superiority, this doctrine was superseded. The Army's tactical flexibility allowed it to adapt to delaying-action defense without air cover. The German High Command, often biased, restricted flexibility in army commanders, including Hitler. His insistence on holding ground and old-style counterattacks cost the army both men and material. The basic field tactics were divided into three main parts.

Operational Reconnaissance (Operationale Aufklärung), a common task in armies, involves long-range observation by air, tactical Reconnaissance (taktische Aufklärung), carried out 15–20 miles in advance of an attacking force, and Battle Reconnaissance (Gefechtsaufklärung), close-range reconnaissance as a division moves in to engage an enemy. Armoured reconnaissance Abteilungen of armoured Divisions are entrusted with the most important pattern, with the standard patrol consisting of three armoured cars providing mutual observation and covering fire.

Once contact had been established, it was standard procedure to attempt to gain local numerical superiority by calling upon the battalion's reserve armoured infantry to advance scouting operations and drive in enemy outposts. The infantry were not usually expected to undertake offensive reconnaissance, as the infantry divisions were intended only for consolidation and mopping up. However, in specialised circumstances, such as mountain work or other difficult terrain, they were used. In such cases, fighting patrols of 7–8 men, or occasionally 15–20 men, were sent out in a manner similar to that seen in the First World War. They were mainly armed with automatic and semi-automatic weapons, and were not expected to engage in serious, prolonged fighting. Their duty was to take prisoners if possible and report back. This practice naturally became more common when the army was permanently on the defensive, at which point infantry divisions often had specialist bicycle or mounted units for mobile reconnaissance work.

The German army's offensive strategy focused on encircling and destroying the enemy using local superiority in armour, fire power, and surprise. They distrusted massed frontal attacks, preferring to strike at a flank and then encircle the enemy. The Schwerpunkt concept, which required surprise, postulated a narrow front penetration by fast-moving forces, while diversionary attacks prevented reinforcements from moving up. The penetration was extended as a breakthrough, threatening the enemy's communications and forcing them to retire their entire front. The success of this strategy depended on sealing off flanks to protect communications and having a powerful central reserve. The form was known as Keil und Kessel (Wedge and Cauldron), as opposing forces could be trapped in a 'cauldron'. Early Russian front campaigns are examples of successful use of this tactic on a large scale.

The original concept of massed tank breakthroughs was to protect flanks with speed and confusion. However, as air superiority declined, the concept was modified to allow attacking forces to protect their own flanks. Armoured formations were expected to spearhead attacks, but a more cautious approach was adopted against prepared positions. German artillery regiments were often decentralized, with multi-barrelled mortars and close-support assault weapons as substitutes. The tank attack strategy involved attacking in two or three waves, with armoured infantry and SP anti-tank and assault guns on the flanks. The first wave took the brunt of the fighting, while the second wave provided covering fire and dealt with remaining opposition. The third wave, supported by motorised infantry, established the breakthrough and guarded the attack's flanks. The enemy tanks were to be engaged by mobile assault guns and specialized tank destroyers.

Although the massed infantry attack was far from common practice, but when employed, it was based on the same principles. Where possible, penetration was to be achieved by infiltration tactics combined with the deployment of special assault squads (Stosstruppe) to overcome key strongpoints. Much greater emphasis was placed on artillery and mortar support, and assault howitzers were to be used in large numbers to engage enemy support weapons over open sights if required. Special assault gun brigades were formed for this purpose, although their massed use became less common as the war went on. The Germans were extremely adept at infiltration, which was often successful because of the confusion it caused. However, once they reverted to massed frontal infantry attacks, as they did at Anzio for instance, their effectiveness decreased significantly.

Defensive operations were initially designed as holding situations awaiting offensive resumption, emphasizing immediate counterattacks. However, after 1943, a more general defensive posture was needed, and the principle of defense in depth was redeveloped, focusing on three main areas. The first was a series of advanced positions 5,000-7,000 yards ahead of the main defense zone, manned by light mobile units to make the enemy deploy too early and in the wrong sector. They were not to hold out, but to slip away when done. The outpost position, located 2500 yards ahead of main defences, was manned by infantry units, support weapons, and antitank gun teams. Positions were prepared to provide mutual support and were often registered by the German artillery to prevent enemy observation. Infantry weapons were typically longer-range, and alternative positions were prepared to confuse the enemy.

The main battle zone (Hauptkampfinie) consisted of connected strong points on reverse slopes with an all-round field of fire, protected by wire and mines, and manned by riflemen and machine gunners. The Germans preferred building points on rivers due to the greater effort required. Field camouflage and natural obstacles were improved, and flashless propellant made lightly defended positions appear formidable, holding up allied attacks. The art of field camouflage and natural obstacles was a high priority in the German army. German forces were skilled at timely and unobtrusive withdrawal during World War II, often allowing allied bombs and artillery barrages to fall harmlessly on empty trenches. Their army organization and tactical initiative allowed for quick improvised formations to fill gaps in emergencies. Battlegroups (kampfgruppen) were a regular feature of German field tactics, ranging from company-sized infantry groups to divisional-sized combinations of all arms. However, once forced into a crust defense, small tactical tricks were insufficient, as lack of mobility made it difficult to provide controlled withdrawals and construct reserve lines at considerable distances.

== Medical service ==
A total of 341,760 men and women were employed in the German medical service at its peak. From 1939 to 1943, the proportion of medical officers (i.e. qualified doctors) serving with the troops increased from 48.4% to 54.5% of the total number of medical officers. At the same time, the proportion of non-commissioned officers and enlisted personnel fell from 73.1% to 66.7%. This meant that doctors were sent to the front, while auxiliary medical personnel and Red Cross helpers, mostly nurses, were relied on more heavily in the rear.

=== Evacuation of the wounded ===
The evacuation chain of German wounded during World War II was notably similar to that used by the US Army but differed significantly in the approach to triage, or the sorting of patients for specialized care. Initial treatment was administered in a Verwundetennest, located in a forward position, typically by a medical non-commissioned officer. This process was comparable to the care provided by a US company aid man on the battlefield. At this stage, first aid measures such as applying dressings, improvised splinting for easier transport, traction splinting, pressure bandages, and tourniquets were carried out. From the Verwundetennest, the wounded were transported to the Truppenverbandplatz, which was analogous to the American battalion aid station. Here, the first medical officer, similar to the US battalion surgeon, provided more advanced care.

At the Truppenverbandplatz, treatment included checking and, if necessary, replacing dressings (unless there was a specific reason to leave them undisturbed), performing tracheotomies, applying occlusive dressings for open chest wounds, pain management, and preparing patients for further evacuation. Shock therapy was also administered, using methods such as injections of Periston, physiological saline solution, Coramine, and external heat with electric heaters. Infection prevention played a critical role, with measures such as tetanus and gas gangrene antitoxin injections, oral administration of sulfa pyridine, sulfanilamide powder insufflation into wounds, application of pressure bandages, and hemorrhage control through tourniquets (though rarely with hemostats or ligatures). Catheterization was also performed when needed.

From the Truppenverbandplatz, patients were evacuated to the Hauptverbandplatz, situated approximately four miles behind the combat line. This facility, operated by the Sanitätskompanie of the division, combined both clearing and hospitalization roles. According to its Tables of Organization, it was staffed with two operating surgeons, though during intense periods, up to six or eight additional surgeons could be assigned. Although the unit was designed to accommodate 200 patients, it often expanded to treat 300 or 400. When casualty numbers were manageable, primary surgeries for abdominal wounds and other non-transportable cases were performed here, along with treatment for minor wounds. Patients with complex injuries, such as major compound fractures, brain trauma, and chest wounds, were sent to the Feldlazarett or Kriegslazarett for more comprehensive care.

The Hauptverbandplatz had specific functions outlined in German medical field manuals, including tracheotomies, closure of open chest wounds, aspiration of the pericardium in cases of cardiac tamponade, emergency amputations, hemorrhage control, blood transfusions, surgical care for non-transportable patients, and suprapubic cystostomies. The next step in the evacuation chain was the Feldlazarett, an Army unit designed to care for up to 200 patients. This facility typically handled primary surgeries for head wounds, transportable chest injuries, severe muscle wounds, buttock wounds, and major compound fractures. While abdominal surgeries were ideally performed as close to the front as possible, the Feldlazarett often assumed this role when the Hauptverbandplatz was overwhelmed. The unit was staffed by two surgeons, but additional personnel could be temporarily assigned during high-demand periods.

The Kriegslazarett, or General Hospital, was typically assigned to the Army Group level. Its primary role was to provide care for patients who could not return to duty from forward units. It also performed primary surgeries for specific cases, such as penetrating head wounds involving the eyes or ears and maxillofacial injuries. During periods of heavy casualties, the Kriegslazarett handled all major surgeries, allowing forward units to focus on treating soldiers who could quickly return to duty. In particularly busy times, abdominal and head wounds might go untreated due to the overwhelming number of casualties.

In addition to these main medical facilities, specialized hospitals were established for lightly wounded, recovering, or convalescent patients. Each German division had an Ersatzkompanie, which functioned as a replacement depot and rehabilitation unit for lightly wounded soldiers who had undergone primary surgery at the Hauptverbandplatz. These soldiers participated in light exercise under medical supervision and were typically returned to duty within a week. The Ersatzkompanie also housed 50 to 100 lightly wounded soldiers, alongside replacements from Germany who stayed only briefly before being sent into combat. The officers and medical staff of the Ersatzkompanie were often personnel with limited service capability due to previous wounds or illnesses. In rear areas and general hospital centers, hospitals for lightly sick and wounded soldiers were established by transport units (Krankentransportabteilungen). These facilities received patients from Feldlazaretten in Army areas or from Kriegslazaretten in Army Group zones. Most patients remained in these hospitals for two to three weeks before either returning to duty or being transferred elsewhere for further treatment.

== Personnel ==
=== Ranks ===
==== Commissioned officers ====
Rank group	General / flag officers					Senior officers			Junior officers
German Army
German Army	Generalfeldmarschall	Generaloberst	General der Waffengattung	Generalleutnant	Generalmajor	Oberst	Oberstleutnant	Major	Hauptmann	Oberleutnant	Leutnant

==== Enlisted personnel ====
Rank group	Senior NCOs			Junior NCOs		Enlisted
German Army										No insignia
German Army	Stabsfeldwebel	Oberfeldwebel	Feldwebel	Unterfeldwebel	Unteroffizier	Stabsgefreiter	Obergefreiter	Gefreiter	Obersoldat	Soldat

=== Pay ===
Every active-duty member of the German Army during wartime (excluding prisoners of war) received tax-exempt war service pay (Wehrsold), which was provided in advance by the unit's paymaster. Payments were made monthly or at intervals of no less than 10 days. Soldiers with dependents also received family support payments, which were distributed directly to their dependents through civilian authorities, even if the soldier was held as a prisoner of war. Additionally, all servicemen (including prisoners of war) were compensated with the equivalent of their standard peacetime salary (Friedensbesoldung). This consisted of base pay (Grundgehalt), a housing allowance (Wohnungszuschlag), and a child allowance (Kinderzuschlag), minus a wartime deduction (Ausgleichsbetrag). For ranks of major and above, this deduction fully offset the war service pay, while for lower ranks, it partially offset it based on a sliding scale. This overall payment was referred to as Wehrmachtbesoldung (Armed Forces regular pay). However, servicemen receiving this compensation were not eligible for civilian family support.

The regular pay was typically issued by local garrison administrations in Germany, often close to the soldier’s home. Payments were made two months in advance (reduced to one month in advance after January 1, 1945) and deposited into the soldier’s bank account or sent to their dependents, if applicable. These payments were subject to income tax deductions at the source, calculated on a sliding scale that took into account the soldier’s pay amount, the number of dependents, and their classification. In the German military, salaries were based on rank and length of service.

With the exception of the Air Force, no differentiation was made between various branches or roles. This meant that all senior privates earned the same base pay, regardless of whether they were serving as a rifleman on the frontlines in Russia or working as an orderly in the comfortable environment of the General Staff Headquarters. During the years leading up to and throughout World War II, annual base pay and salaries varied significantly. A recruit earned less than 200 Marks per year, while a non-commissioned officer with 13 years of service earned 2,064 Marks. Majors received 7,700 Marks annually, while certain colonel generals earned as much as 26,500 Marks. These disparities were pronounced—particularly when considering that the income of a colonel general was nearly 25 times the average share of the gross national product per capita, which stood at a little over 1,000 Marks in 1938.

==== Pay scale ====
Rank	pay group	regular pay (gross)	pay group	war service pay
Generalfeldmarschall	W1	2802 RM	1 a	300 RM
Generaloberst	W2	2520 RM	1 a	300 RM
General der Waffengattung	W3	1795.10 RM	1 b	270 RM
Generalleutnant	W4	1433.44 RM	2	240 RM
Generalmajor	W5	1197.42 RM	3	210 RM
Oberst	W6	961.08 RM	5	150 RM
Oberstleutnant	W7	735.72 RM	6	120 RM
Major	W8	618.47 RM	7	108 RM
Hauptmann	W9	451.23 RM	8	96 RM
Oberleutnant	W10	280.24 RM	9	81RM
Leutnant	W11	195.16 RM	10	72 RM
Stabsfeldwebel	W19	222.20 RM	11	60 RM
Oberfeldwebel	W20	214.68 RM	""	""
less than 12 years	W21	195.41 RM	""	""
Feldwebel	W22	210.31 RM	12	54 RM
less than 12 years	W23	196.71 RM	""	""
Unterfeldwebel	W24	197.88 RM	13	45 RM
less than 12 years	W25	172.81 RM	""	""
Unteroffizier	W26	180.67 RM	14	42 RM
less than 12 years	W27	146.67 RM	""	""
Stabsgefreiter	W30	90 RM	15	36 RM
Obergefreiter	W31	77.50 RM	16	30 RM

== Equipment ==
Contrary to popular belief, the German Army in World War II was not a mechanised juggernaut as a whole. In 1941, between 60 and 70 percent of their forces were not motorised, relying on railroad for rapid movement and on horse-drawn transport cross country. The percentage of motorisation decreased thereafter. In 1944 approximately 85 percent of the Army was not motorised.

=== Uniforms ===
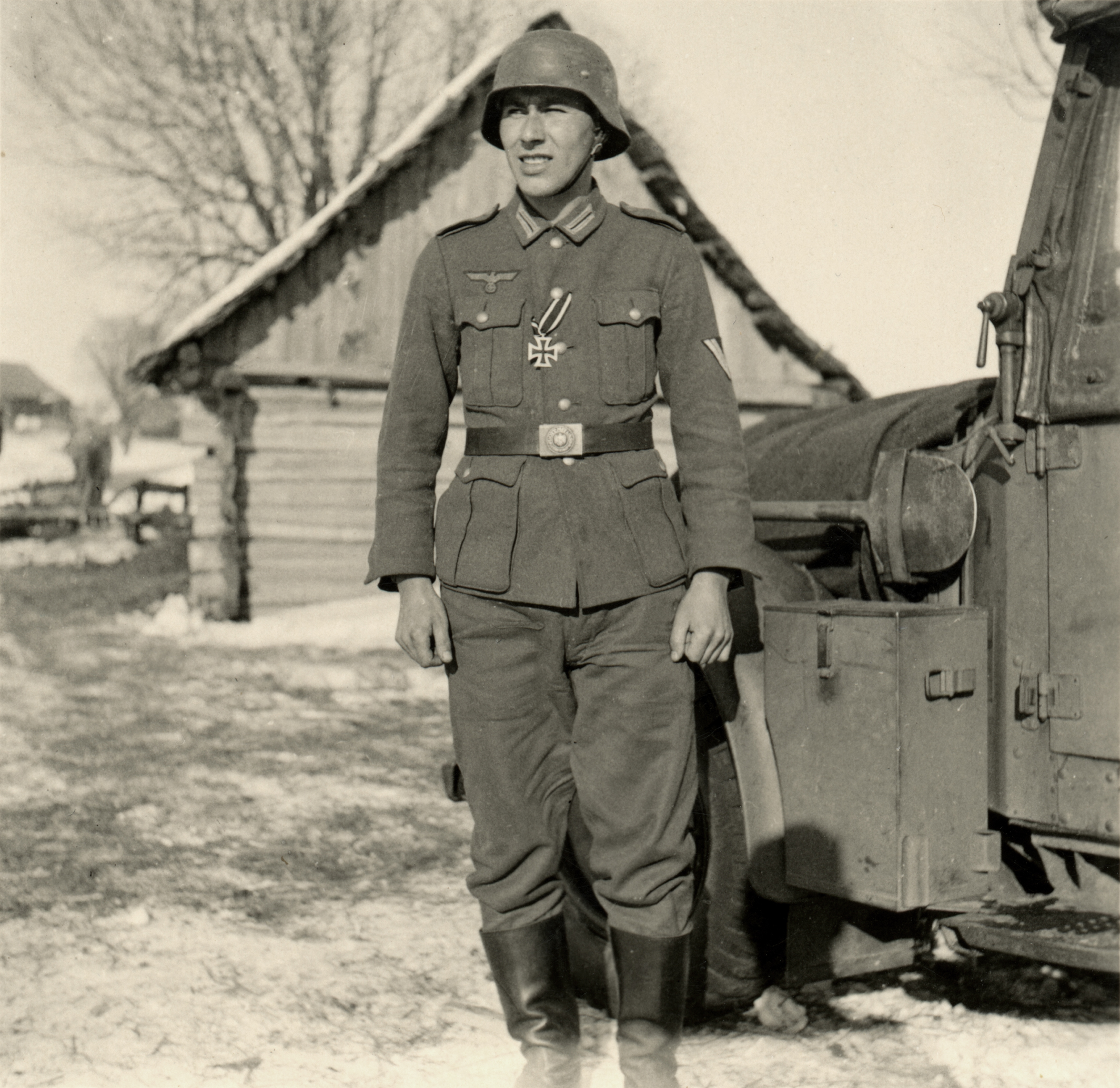
Common German soldier with feldgrau field tunic

The German Army's uniforms were designed to reflect a cohesive military identity, with changes dictated by Army Orders. Soldiers, particularly senior officers, retained older uniforms due to sentimental value or superior quality. An Army Order allowed obsolete clothing to be worn for the war. The key symbol of the Wehrmacht was the breast eagle, introduced in 1934, symbolizing fitness to bear arms. Other organizations adopted the eagle insignia on the left arm. The new army uniforms were established in 1935 following the publication of Dress Regulations. The basic uniform color, feldgrau was introduced in 1929, with a greenish tint. Facings were made of a finely woven bluish dark-green "facing-cloth" in 1935. Uniform items from the earlier Reichswehr period were intended to be withdrawn by 1937, but were occasionally seen during World War II. The 1935 Dress Regulations outlined ten types of uniforms for officers, including ceremonial, parade, service, undress, guard, field, and walking-out uniforms. During the war, new regulations were issued in 1939, simplifying uniform types and easing strict adherence to earlier standards. Field uniforms became the most common type of clothing, while Replacement Army units often issued captured uniforms from Austrian, Czech, Dutch, French, and British forces.

The M1933 field tunic replaced the M1920 Reichswehr service tunic, featuring a peaked cap and ribbons. The tunic featured insignia, patch pockets, and a cloth collar. Officers' field greatcoats had shoulder boards and an open back seam, while earlier tunics had field-quality insignia and no piping. Officers in combat units wore the M1935 steel helmet, field tunic, and field greatcoat, along with personal equipment like breeches, riding boots, gloves, and sidearms. They carried 6x30 binoculars and often replaced helmets with M1934 or M1938 field caps. Helmets were camouflaged using mud, chicken wire, or M1931 bread bag straps. On March 21, 1940, the conspicuous national shield was removed from helmets. Starting October 31, 1939, officers below general rank in combat units were ordered to wear the M1935 field tunic, trousers, and marching boots of other ranks.

Junior officers, acting as platoon leaders, carried various equipment such as binoculars, compass, signal whistle, and a leather M1935 dispatch case. Riflemen's standard field equipment included black leather M1939 infantry Y-straps, ammunition pouches, bayonets, and an entrenching tool. They carried bread bags, canteens, mess kits, and camouflage shelter-quarters. Gas masks were stored in cylindrical metal canisters and gas capes were worn on the chest. By September 1939, many officers were equipped with the MP 38 submachine gun and olive-green M1938 magazine pouches. Senior non-commissioned officers' service uniforms included a peaked cap, M1933 field tunic, M1935 field greatcoat, trousers, marching boots, a black belt, a pistol with a holster, and grey suede gloves. Junior NCOs wore helmets instead of service caps and Y-straps. The M1935 other ranks' field cap featured feldgrau cloth with a feldgrau flap, and the field uniform for other ranks included helmets, tunics, plain trousers, marching boots, and grey suede gloves.

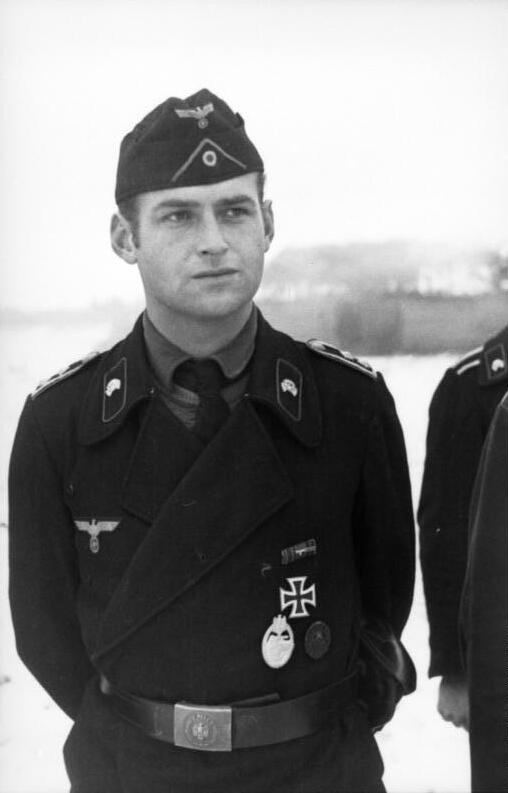
Black uniform of an Oberfeldwebel (Master Sergeant) of the Panzertruppe.

The M1934 black uniform, initially only for tank crews, was later adopted by other Panzer divisions, including signals, artillery, armoured reconnaissance, and engineer battalions. However, unauthorized personnel, including general officers, staff officers, and doctors, unofficially adopted the uniform. The color, double-breasted jacket, and collar patch skulls were designed to evoke the prestige of the Imperial German Cavalry. Unauthorized personnel, such as general officers and staff officers, unofficially adopted the uniform.

The black uniform, introduced in 1934, was worn on all occasions except ceremonial. It consisted of the standard M1934 padded beret, a dark-grey tricot pullover shirt, black tie, M1934 field jacket, M1934 field trousers, and black lace-up shoes. The beret was made of thick felt or red rubber sponge covered in black wool. Officers wore an eagle and swastika in bright aluminium bullion on the front, while other ranks had a badge in matt silver-grey machine-woven cotton thread. The beret became cumbersome in armoured vehicles, so it was replaced by the M1940 officers' black field cap and the M1940 other ranks' black field cap. Many officers and NCOs preferred the feldgrau officers' M1935 peaked cap, M1934 peaked field cap, M1938 field cap, or other ranks' M1935 peaked cap or M1934 field cap.

The black, double-breasted, hip-length Panzer field jacket was made of wool and had a wide collar with 2 mm branch-colour facing-cloth piping and wide lapels. The fly-front fastened with four large black horn or plastic buttons, with three smaller buttons left exposed above. Officers wore a matt aluminium breast eagle, while other ranks wore a white cotton breast eagle, which was later replaced by a matt silver-grey machine-woven cotton breast eagle, all on a black cloth backing. All ranks wore standard black cloth collar patches with branch-colour piping and a bright aluminium-stamped skull. All ranks wore field-quality shoulder and sleeve rank insignia with black cloth replacing the dark green facing cloth for non-commissioned officers (NCOs) and men. Non-commissioned officers did not wear bright aluminium yarn collar braid. The plain black M1934 trousers tapered at the bottom to create a bloused effect and fastened with buttons and ties at the ankle. In the field, all ranks wore a leather belt with a pistol holster.

== War crimes ==
Nazi propaganda had told German soldiers to wipe out what were variously called Jewish Bolshevik subhumans, the Mongol hordes, the Asiatic flood, and the red beast.The atrocities and war crimes committed by the Wehrmacht, specifically the German Army (Heer), during World War II, are a subject of historical scrutiny that undermines the myth of a "clean Wehrmacht" often perpetuated after the war. While the Waffen-SS is frequently associated with some of the most heinous crimes of the Nazi regime, it is now widely recognized that the Wehrmacht played an integral role in the systemic violence and atrocities carried out during the war, particularly in occupied territories.

The German Army actively participated in the implementation of the Nazi regime’s policies of conquest, extermination, and racial domination, particularly on the Eastern Front during Operation Barbarossa, the invasion of the Soviet Union in 1941. Here, the Wehrmacht was complicit in the mass murder of civilians, including Jews, political prisoners, and other perceived "undesirables." The infamous "Commissar Order" issued by the German High Command before the invasion, instructed soldiers to execute Soviet political commissars on sight, in direct violation of the laws of war. This policy led to the summary execution of tens of thousands of individuals.

The treatment of Soviet prisoners of war (POWs) by the Wehrmacht stands as another stark example of systemic atrocities. Out of approximately 5.7 million Soviet POWs captured during the war, an estimated 3.3 million perished due to deliberate neglect, starvation, forced marches, and outright executions. Many POWs were either shot on the spot or sent to camps where they were subjected to inhumane conditions, deprived of basic sustenance, and left to die from disease and exposure. These actions were part of the broader Nazi policy of dehumanizing Slavs and treating them as expendable.

In occupied territories, particularly in Eastern Europe and the Balkans, the Wehrmacht engaged in widespread reprisals against civilians in response to partisan activity. Entire villages were razed to the ground, and their inhabitants were executed en masse as part of a brutal counterinsurgency strategy. For example, in the Greek village of Kalavryta in December 1943, Wehrmacht troops massacred nearly all the male inhabitants and burned the village in retaliation for resistance attacks. Similar atrocities occurred in the Soviet Union, Poland, and Yugoslavia, where scorched-earth tactics left a trail of destruction and death.

== See also ==
- Reichswehr, the preceding German army of the Weimar Republic (1919–1935)
- German Army, the post-World War II army of West Germany and the modern army of Germany (1955–present)
- Army Personnel Office (Wehrmacht)
- Bribery of senior Wehrmacht officers
- General der Nachrichtenaufklärung
- Glossary of German military terms
- Military production during World War II
- Ranks and insignia of the German Army (1935–1945)
- Waffenamt
- War crimes of the Wehrmacht

== Bibliography ==
- "Enactments and Approved Papers of the Control Council and Co-ordinating Committee" (PDF). Library of Congress. 1946a.
- "Enactments and Approved Papers of the Control Council and Co-ordinating Committee" (PDF). Library of Congress. 1946b.
- Balsamo, Larry T. (1991). "Germany's Armed Forces in the Second World War: Manpower, Armaments, and Supply". The History Teacher. 24 (3): 263–277. doi:10.2307/494616. ISSN 0018-2745. JSTOR 494616.
- Blennemann, Dirk; et al. (Hitler's army : the evolution and structure of German forces) (21 March 1996). Building the Beast: The World War II Training and Replacement Systems of the German Army. Da Capo Press. ISBN 0-938289-55-1.
- Böhler, Jochen (2006). Auftakt zum Vernichtungskrieg. Die Wehrmacht in Polen 1939 (in German). Frankfurt: Fischer Taschenbuch Verlag. ISBN 978-3-596-16307-6.
- Buchner, Alex (1991). The German Infantry Handbook, 1939 1945. Schiffer Publishing. ISBN 0-88740-284-4.
- Caddick-Adams, Peter (2015). Snow & Steel: The Battle of the Bulge, 1944–45. Oxford University Press. ISBN 9780199335145.
- van Crefeld, Martin (1992). Kampfkraft : Militärische Organisation und militärische Leistung, 1939-1945 (in German). Freiburg im Breisgau: Rombach Verlag. ISBN 3-7930-0189-X.
- Davies, W.J.K. (1984). German army handbook, 1939-1945. New York: Arco. ISBN 0-668-04291-5.
- Evans, Richard J. (1989). In Hitler's Shadow West German Historians and the Attempt to Escape the Nazi Past. New York: Pantheon. ISBN 978-0-394-57686-2.
- Förster, Jürgen (1998). "Operation Barbarossa as a war of conquest and annihilation". In Militärgeschichtliches Forschungsamt (Research Institute for Military History) (ed.). The attack on the Soviet Union. Germany and the Second World War. Vol. IV. Oxford: Clarendon Press. ISBN 0-19-822886-4.
- DiNardo, R. L. (2006). Germany's panzer arm in World War II. Mechanicsburg: Stackpole Books. ISBN 9780811733427.
- Grossman, David A. (1993). Maneuver Warfare in the Light Infantry-The Rommel Model (PDF). Archived from the original (PDF) on 18 November 2016.
- U.S. War Department, ed. (1995). Handbook on German military forces. Baton Rouge: Louisiana State University Press. ISBN 0807120111.
- Hamburg Institute for Social Research, ed. (1999). The German army and genocide : crimes against war prisoners, Jews, and other civilians in the East, 1939-1944. New York: The New York Press. ISBN 1565845250.
- Haskew, Michael (2011). The Wehrmacht: 1935–1945. Amber Books Ltd. ISBN 978-1-907446-95-5.
- Keegan, John (1982). Six Armies in Normandy. Viking Press. ISBN 978-0670647361.
- Krause, Michael D.; Phillips, R. Cody (2006). Historical Perspectives of the Operational Art. Government Printing Office. ISBN 9780160725647.
- Large, David Clay (1996). Germans to the Front: West German Rearmament in the Adenauer Era. The University of North Carolina Press. ISBN 978-0807845394.
- Lucas, James (2002). German Army Handbook 1939 1945. Sutton. ISBN 0-7509-3191-4.
- Mazower, Mark (2001). Inside Hitler's Greece : the experience of occupation, 1941-44. New Haven: Yale University Press. ISBN 0300089236.
- Müller, Rolf-Dieter (1998). "The failure of the economic Blitzkrieg strategy". In Militärgeschichtliches Forschungsamt (Research Institute for Military History) (ed.). The attack on the Soviet Union. Germany and the Second World War. Vol. IV. Oxford: Clarendon Press. ISBN 0-19-822886-4.
- McNab, Chris (2011). Hitler's Armies: The German War Machine- 1939-1945. Oxford: Osprey Publishing. ISBN 978-1-84908-647-9.
- O'Neill, Robert (1966). The German Army and the Nazi Party, 1933–39. London: Corgi. ISBN 0-552-07910-3.
- Overmans, Rüdiger (2000). Deutsche militärische Verluste im Zweiten Weltkrieg (in German). De Gruyter Oldenbourg. ISBN 3-486-56531-1.
- Rice, Earle Jr. (2005). Blitzkrieg! Hitler's Lightning War. Mitchell Lane Publishers, Inc. ISBN 9781612286976.
- Shepherd, Ben (2016). Hitler's soldiers : the German army in the Third Reich. New Haven: Yale University Press. ISBN 9780300179033.
- Stone, David (2009). Hitler's army, 1939-1945 : the men, machines and organization. Minneapolis: Zenith Press. ISBN 9780760337509.
- Stroud, Rick (2013). The Phantom Army of Alamein: The Men Who Hoodwinked Rommel. A&C Black. ISBN 9781408831281.
- Tucker, Spencer C. (2009). A Global Chronology of Conflict: From the Ancient World to the Modern Middle East: From the Ancient World to the Modern Middle East. ABC-CLIO. ISBN 978-1-85109-672-5.
- Vigor, P.H. (1983). Soviet Blitzkrieg Theory. Springer. ISBN 9781349048144.
- Williamson, Gordon (2002). German Army Elite Units 1939-1945. Oxford: Osprey Publishing. ISBN 1-84176-405-1.
- OKW, ed. (1944). Wehrmacht-besoldungstabellen (PDF) (in German). Berlin: Bernard & Graefe.
- Hoffmann, W.; Waldmann, A. (1936). "Lehrbuch der Militärhygiene". Berlin: Julius Springer.
- Verlag Moritz Ruhl (1936). Deutsche Uniformen [German Uniforms] (in German). Leipzig: Verlag Moritz Ruhl.
- War Department (1 September 1943). TM-E 30-451 Handbook on German Military Forces. Washington, D.C.: War Department.
- Wiltse, Charles M. (1963). Office of the Chief of Military History (ed.). The Medical Department: medical service in the Mediterranean and minor theaters. United States Army in World War II. Washington D.C.: U.S. Government Printing Office.
- Zabecki, David T. (1999). World War Two in Europe. Taylor & Francis. ISBN 9780824070298.
- Zeiler, Thomas W.; DuBois, Daniel M. (2012). A Companion to World War II. John Wiley & Sons. ISBN 978-1-118-32504-9.
