= Schütze =

German military rank

Schütze in German means "rifleman" or "shooter", or in older terms originally connoted "archer" before the advent of the rifle. It also occasionally occurs as a surname, or as Schütz, as in the opera Der Freischütz. The word itself is derived from the German word schützen, meaning to protect, or to guard. It was originally used for archers as they protected castle walls, and is the German equivalent to Sagittarius, the mythical form which held bow and arrow.

== Overview ==
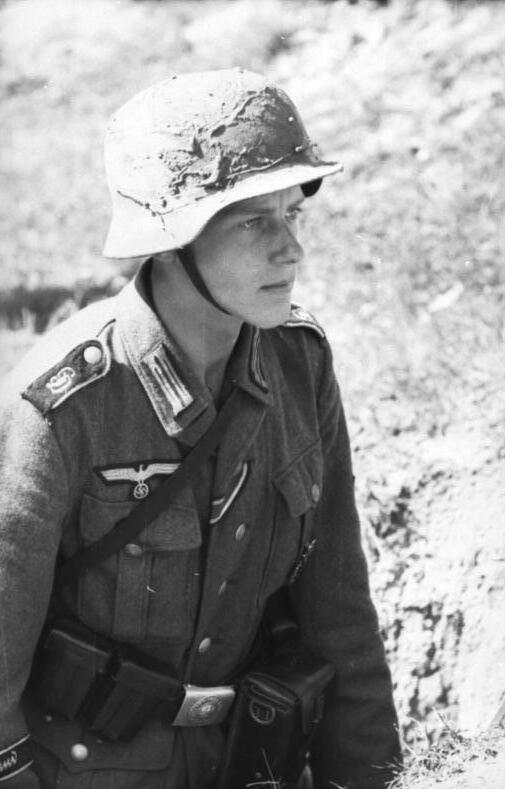
A Schütze of the Panzergrenadier Division Großdeutschland in Russia, 1943

As a rank of the Armed Forces of Germany in First World War until 1918, Schütze was used for the lowest enlisted ranks in machine gun units and some elite troops like Saxon Schützen-Regiment 108 exclusively. Usually translated as "private", from 1920 on it names the lowest enlisted rank of the Reichswehr infantry. The equivalent of Schütze in the other branches of the German military was Jäger, Kanonier, Pionier, Kraftfahrer or Grenadier in the army; Flieger in the Luftwaffe, Matrose in the Reichsmarine and Kriegsmarine, respectively.

Rank insignia of a Schütze of the Heer until 1942 (the rank of Schütze became Grenadier after 1942)

Collar patch	Shoulder strap	Sleeve badge (left upper arm)	Rank description	Equivalent
		---	Schütze	

== Second World War ==
During the Second World War, it also became a rank in the Waffen-SS, SS-Schütze. Other branches of the SS referred to the rank as Mann.

Insignia of rank Schütze of the Waffen-SS

Shoulder strap (insignia) in Feldgrau
(all other enlisted ranks OR-1 to OR-3 of the Waffen-SS)

Gorget patches

== Modern-day Schütze ==
Insignia of Bundeswehr modern day Schütze, here shoulder strap

The present-day German military maintains Schütze as the lowest enlisted grade, with a NATO rank code of OR-1. A Schütze ranks below Gefreiter which is the equivalent of a private (OR-2); the equivalent of a private first class being an Obergefreiter or Hauptgefreiter.

During various periods in German military history, a senior private rank known as Oberschütze existed between the grades of Schütze and Gefreiter. In the modern German Army the rank of Schütze is not used very often. Every part of the Bundeswehr has a different name for this rank. For example, in the Panzergrenadiertruppe (heavy mechanized infantry) the name of the rank is Panzergrenadier, and within the Fernmelder (communication troops), the name is Funker (radio operator).

== See also ==
- Modern-day Schütze (in German)
- Schutz

Junior Rank no	Rank Waffen-SS; SS-Schütze	Senior Rank; SS-Oberschütze
Junior Rank; SS-Anwärter	Rank Allgemeine-SS; SS-Mann	Senior Rank; No equivalent

== Bibliography ==
- Haskew, Michael (2011). The Wehrmacht. Amber Books Ltd. ISBN 978-1-907446-95-5.
- Lumsden, Robin (2000). A Collector's Guide To: The Waffen–SS. Ian Allan Publishing, Inc. ISBN 0-7110-2285-2.
- McNab, Chris (2009). The SS: 1923–1945. Amber Books Ltd. ISBN 978-1-906626-49-5.
