= Brigadeführer =

General's rank in the Schutzstaffel (SS)

- Post April 1942 gorget patch

- Shoulder and camo insignia
- Country: Nazi Germany
- Service branch: Schutzstaffel; Sturmabteilung; National Socialist Motor Corps; National Socialist Flyers Corps
- Abbreviation: Brif
- Rank: One-star
- NATO rank code: OF-6
- Non-NATO rank: O-7
- Formation: 1933
- Abolished: 1945
- Next higher rank: Gruppenführer
- Next lower rank: Oberführer
- Equivalent ranks: Generalmajor

Brigadeführer (German: [bʁiˈɡaːdəfyːʁɐ], lit. 'brigade leader') was a paramilitary rank of the Nazi Party (NSDAP) that was used between 1932 and 1945. It was mainly known for its use as an SS rank. As an SA rank, it was used after briefly being known as Untergruppenführer in late 1929 and 1930.

== History ==
The rank was first created due to an expansion of the Schutzstaffel (SS) and assigned to those officers in command of SS-Brigaden. In 1933, the SS-Brigaden were changed in name to SS-Abschnitte; however, the rank of Brigadeführer remained the same.

Originally, Brigadeführer was considered the second general officer rank of the SS and ranked between Oberführer and Gruppenführer. This changed with the rise of the Waffen-SS and the Ordnungspolizei. In both of those organizations, Brigadeführer was the equivalent to a Generalmajor and ranked above an Oberst in the German Army or police. The rank of Generalmajor was the equivalent of brigadier general, a one-star general in the US Army.The insignia for Brigadeführer was at first two oak leaves and a silver pip; however, the design was changed to three oak leaves in April 1942 after the creation of the rank SS-Oberst-Gruppenführer. Brigadeführer in the Waffen-SS or police also wore the shoulder insignia of a Generalmajor and were referred to as such after their SS rank (e.g. SS-Brigadeführer und Generalmajor der Waffen-SS und Polizei).

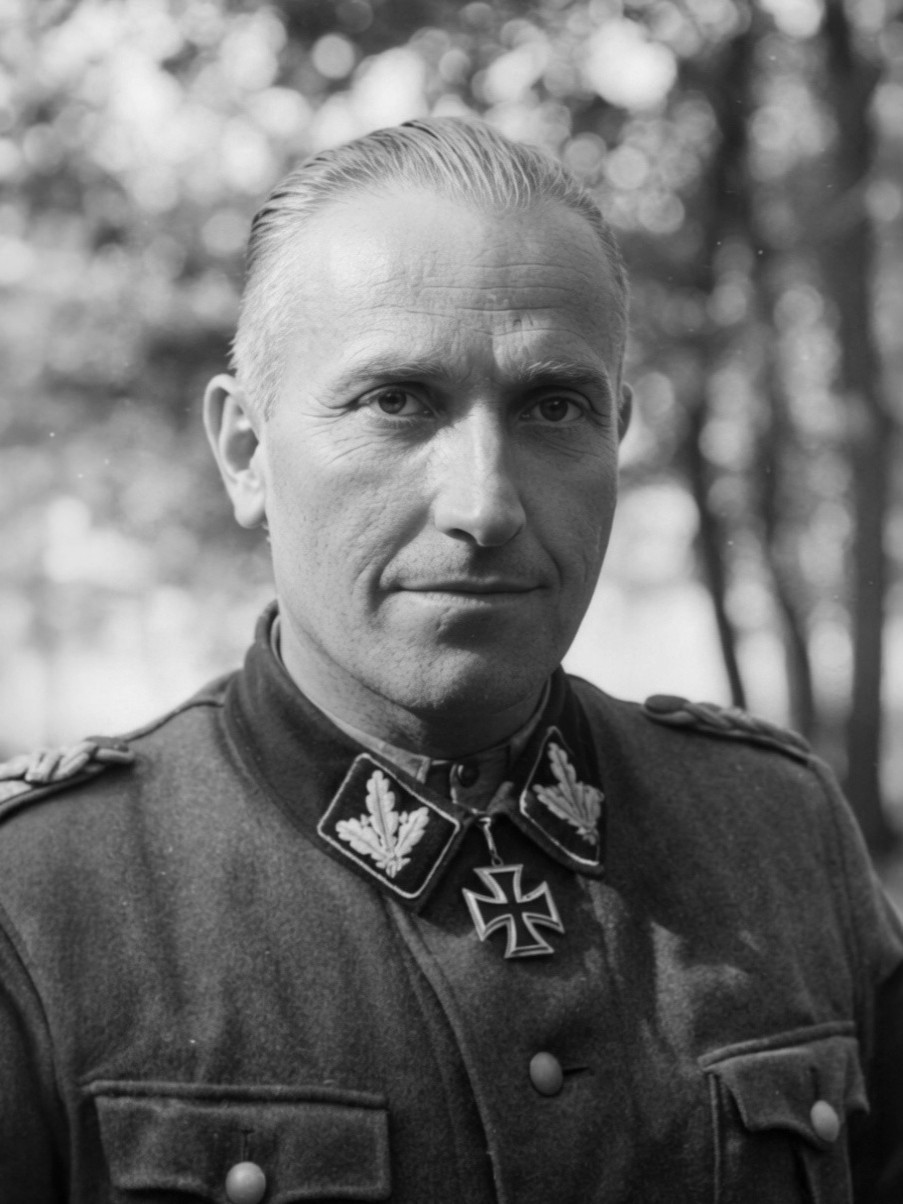
Hermann Prieß as SS-Brigadeführer and Generalmajor of the Waffen-SS

== Insignia ==
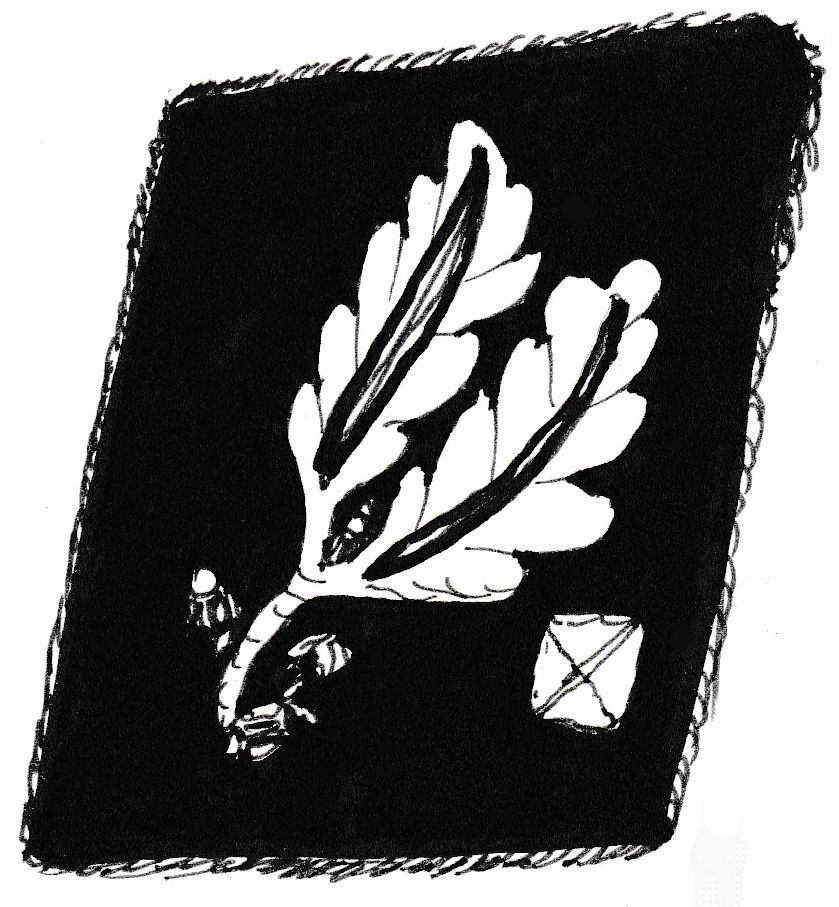
Gorget patch
until April 1942
(Allgemeine SS and Waffen-SS)

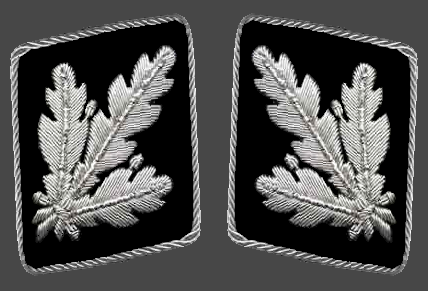
Gorget patches
1942–1945
(Allgemeine SS and Waffen-SS)

Shoulder board
(Waffen-SS)

NSFK gorget patch

NSKK gorget patch

Junior Rank; Oberführer	SS rank and SA rank Brigadeführer	Senior Rank; Gruppenführer

== See also ==
- Corps colours (Waffen-SS)
- List SS-Brigadeführer
- Table of ranks and insignia of the Waffen-SS

== Bibliography ==
- Flaherty, T. H. (2004) [1988]. The Third Reich: The SS. Time-Life Books, Inc. ISBN 1-84447-073-3.
- McNab, Chris (2009). The SS: 1923–1945. Amber Books Ltd. ISBN 978-1-906626-49-5.
- McNab, Chris (2009b). The Third Reich. Amber Books Ltd. ISBN 978-1-906626-51-8.
- Stein, George (2002) [1966]. The Waffen-SS: Hitler's Elite Guard at War 1939–1945. Cerberus Publishing Ltd. ISBN 978-1841451008.
