= Sturmhauptführer =

Paramilitary officer's rank in Nazi Germany

Sturmhauptführer / Hauptsturmführer
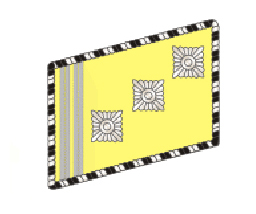
- Sturmabteilung (SA) | Schutzstaffel (SS); Gorget patches
- Country: Nazi Germany
- Service branch: Sturmabteilung; Schutzstaffel
- Abbreviation: Stuhaf / Hstuff
- NATO rank code: OF-2
- Abolished: 8 May 1945

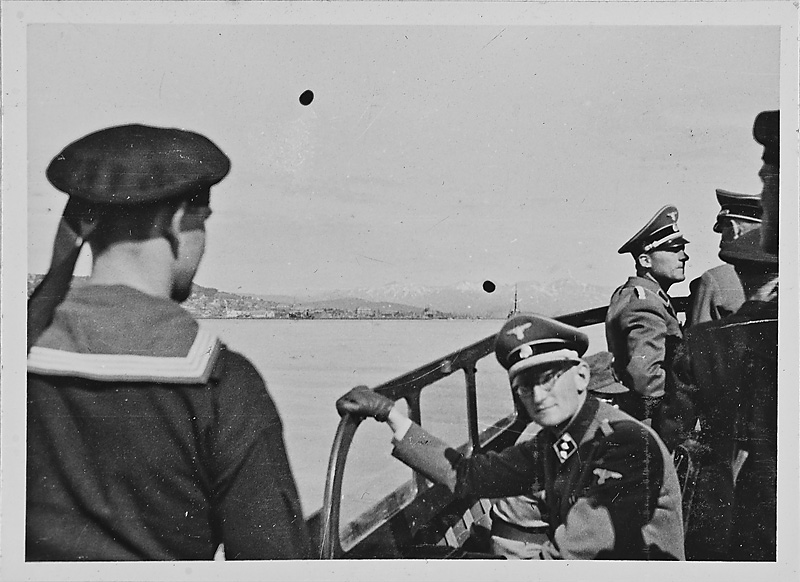
SS-Sturmhauptführer Günther Hagmeister at right; note three pips on gorget patch.

Sturmhauptführer (German: [ˈʃtʊʁmhaʊptˌfyːʁɐ]; lit. 'storm chief leader'; short: Stuhaf), renamed to Hauptsturmführer (lit. 'chief storm leader'; short: Hstuf), was a Nazi Party paramilitary rank designation used by both the Sturmabteilung (SA) and the Schutzstaffel (SS). The rank was the equivalent of a Hauptmann or Rittmeister in the German Army, which is the equivalent of captain (OF-2) in western militaries.

The rank was first created in 1928 as an SA rank, named SA-Sturmhauptführer until 1939/40, and was bestowed upon those SA officers who were company commanders of SA units. The rank translates as "head storm leader" and can trace its origins to the German shock troops of the First World War, who were typically organized into storm trooper companies under an officer ranked lieutenant or captain. SA-Hauptsturmführer was initially considered as more of a senior lieutenant, but after 1932 the rank was rated above that of SA-Obersturmführer and became the equivalent of a captain. The insignia for the rank was also modified to denote the higher status.

As an SS rank, SS-Sturmhauptführer was established in 1930 as a senior rank to that of SS-Sturmführer. In 1934, after the Night of the Long Knives, the SS changed the name to SS-Hauptsturmführer (and by then the new lower rank of SS-Obersturmführer had been established). This was due in large part to separate the SS rank system from the SA, which by then was considered two completely separate organizations. Sturmhauptführer remained an SA rank until 1939/40, and was finally changed to Hauptsturmführer.

Sequence of ranks in comparison with the Wehrmacht (Heer)
junior rank SA-Obersturmführer	SA rank Hauptsturmführer (until 1939/40: Sturmhauptführer)	senior rank SA-Sturmbannführer
junior rank SS-Obersturmführer	SS rank Hauptsturmführer (until 1934: Sturmhauptführer)	senior rank SS-Sturmbannführer
junior rank Oberleutnant (OF-1)	Wehrmacht rank Hauptmann / Rittmeister (OF-2)	senior rank Major (OF-3)
