= Hauptsturmführer =

Officer's rank in the Schutzstaffel (SS)

- SS collar patches
- Country: Nazi Germany
- Service branch: Schutzstaffel; Sturmabteilung; National Socialist Motor Corps; National Socialist Flyers Corps
- Abbreviation: Hstuf
- NATO rank code: OF-2
- Formation: 1934
- Abolished: 1945
- Next higher rank: Sturmbannführer
- Next lower rank: Obersturmführer
- Equivalent ranks: Hauptmann

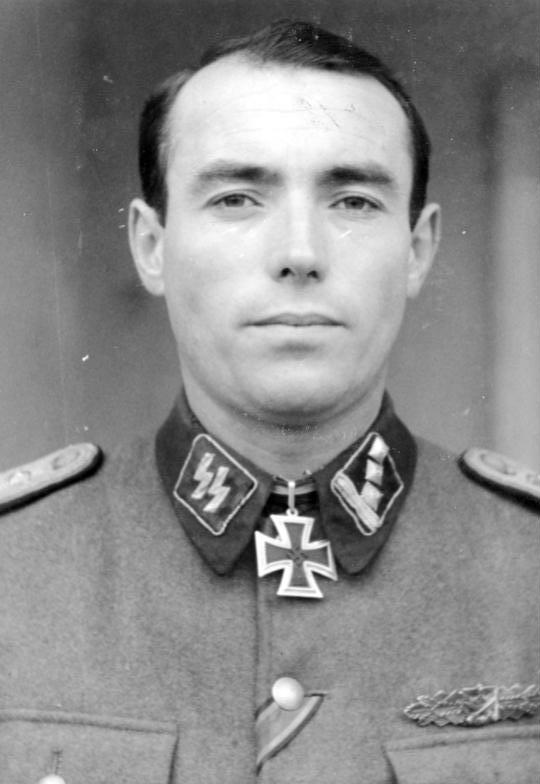
Hauptsturmführer Albert Klett, photographed in 1945

Hauptsturmführer (German: [ˈhaʊpt.ʃtʊʁmˌfyːʁɐ], lit. 'head storm leader'; short: Hstuf) was a Nazi Party paramilitary rank that was used in several Nazi organizations such as the SS, NSKK and the NSFK. The rank of Hauptsturmführer was a mid-level commander and had equivalent seniority to a captain (Hauptmann) in the German Army and also the equivalency of captain in foreign armies.

The rank of Hauptsturmführer evolved from the older rank of Sturmhauptführer, created as a rank of the Sturmabteilung (SA). The SS used the rank of Sturmhauptführer from 1930 to 1934 at which time, following the Night of the Long Knives, the name of the rank was changed to Hauptsturmführer although the insignia remained the same. Sturmhauptführer remained an SA rank until 1939/40.

Some of the most infamous SS members are known to have held the rank of Hauptsturmführer. Among them are Josef Mengele, the infamous doctor assigned to Auschwitz; Joseph Kramer, commandant of Bergen-Belsen concentration camp; Franz Stangl, commandant of Sobibor and Treblinka; Alois Brunner, Adolf Eichmann's assistant; and Amon Göth, who was sentenced to death and hanged for committing multiple waves of mass murder (liquidations of the ghettos at Tarnów and Kraków, the camp at Szebnie, the Kraków-Płaszów concentration camp, as portrayed in the film Schindler's List).

The insignia of Hauptsturmführer was three silver pips and two silver stripes on a black collar patch, worn opposite a unit insignia patch. On the field grey duty uniform, the shoulder boards of an army Hauptmann were also displayed. The rank of Hauptsturmführer was senior to the rank of Obersturmführer and junior to Sturmbannführer.

== Rank insignia ==
Hauptsturmführer SS, SA, NSKK, and NSFK
| Rank insignia: Shoulder insignia; Camo insignia; Gorget patch | Schutzstaffel (SS) | | Sturmabteilung (SA) | NS Motor Corps (NSKK) | NS Flyers Corps (NSFK) |
| Rank insignia: Shoulder insignia; Camo insignia; Gorget patch | Waffen-SS | Allgemeine-SS; Waffen-SS | collar insignia |

Sequence of ranks in comparison with the Wehrmacht (Heer)
| junior rank SA-Obersturmführer | SA rank Hauptsturmführer (until 1939/40: Sturmhauptführer) | senior rank SA-Sturmbannführer |
| junior rank SS-Obersturmführer | SS rank Hauptsturmführer (until 1934: Sturmhauptführer) | senior rank SS-Sturmbannführer |
| junior rank Oberleutnant (OF-1) | Wehrmacht rank Hauptmann / Rittmeister (OF-2) | senior rank Major (OF-3) |

== See also ==
- Ranks and insignia of the Waffen-SS

== Bibliography ==
- Flaherty, T. H. (2004) [1988]. The Third Reich: The SS. Time-Life Books, Inc. ISBN 1-84447-073-3.
- McNab, Chris (2009a). The SS: 1923–1945. Amber Books Ltd. ISBN 978-1-906626-49-5.
- McNab, Chris (2009b). The Third Reich. Amber Books Ltd. ISBN 978-1-906626-51-8.
- Miller, Michael (2006). Leaders of the SS and German Police, Vol. 1. R. James Bender Publishing. ISBN 93-297-0037-3.
