= Uniforms and insignia of the Sturmabteilung =

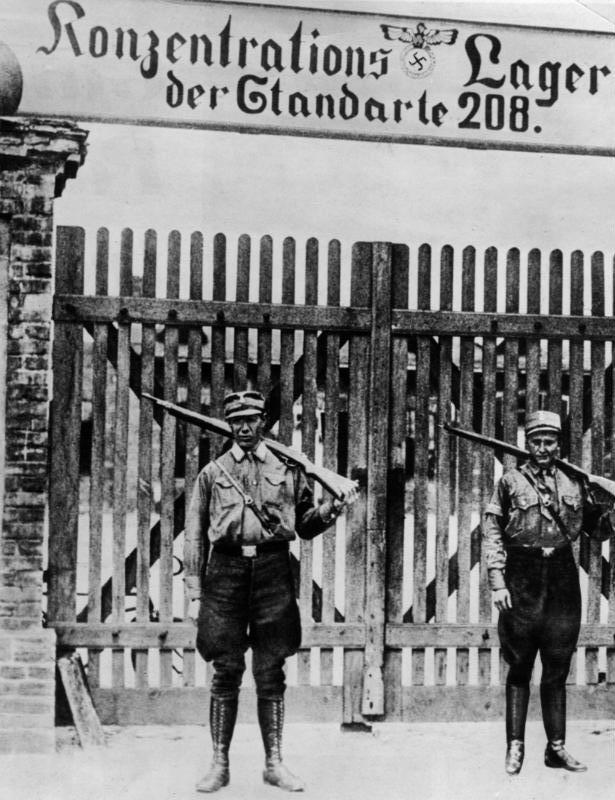
SA guards at Oranienburg concentration camp, 1933

The uniforms and insignia of the Sturmabteilung were Nazi Party paramilitary ranks and uniforms used by SA stormtroopers from 1921 until the fall of Nazi Germany in 1945. The titles and phrases used by the SA were the basis for paramilitary titles used by several other Nazi paramilitary groups, among them the Schutzstaffel (SS). Early SS ranks were identical to the SA, since the SS was originally considered a sub-organisation of the Sturmabteilung.

== Origins of SA titles (1921–1923) ==
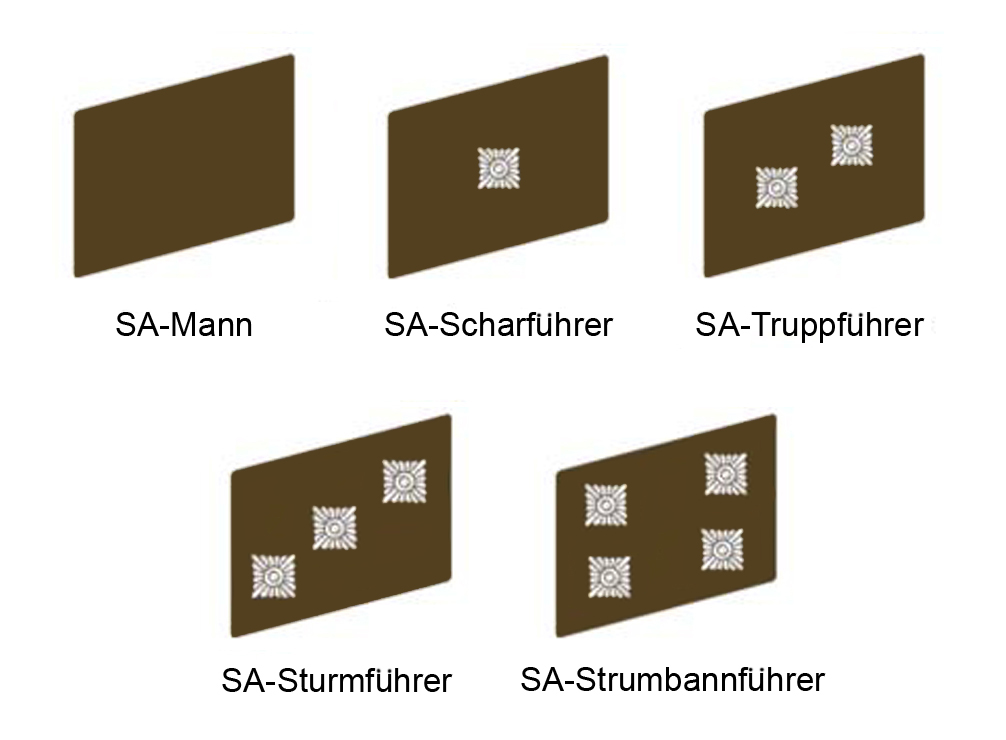
The original pip system used by the SA in the 1920s

The brown shirted stormtroopers of the Sturmabteilung gradually come into being within the Nazi Party beginning in 1920. By this time, Adolf Hitler had assumed the title of Führer of the Nazi Party, replacing Anton Drexler who had been known as the more democratically elected Party Chairman. Hitler began to fashion the Nazi Party on fascist paramilitary lines and, to that end, the early Nazis of the 1920s would typically wear some sort of paramilitary uniform at party meetings and rallies. The most common of these were World War I uniforms with full medals. Also common were uniforms of the Freikorps as well as uniforms of veteran groups such as Der Stahlhelm. Nazi Party members would also mix components from all three types of uniforms with little to no standardisation except a swastika armband worn on the left arm.

By 1921, the Nazi Party had taken its "Sports Detachment", consisting mostly of bodyguards Hitler used for his own protection, and had formed the Nazi stormtroopers, or the "Storm Detachment", which was shortened to be known as the SA. It was at this point that the very first SA titles came into being, although there were no established uniforms or insignia except a swastika armband worn on a paramilitary uniform. At the start of the group's existence, the SA had four primary titles:

- Oberster SA-Führer (Supreme SA-Leader)
- SA-Oberführer (SA-Senior Leader)
- SA-Führer (SA-Leader)
- SA-Mann (SA-Trooper)

In 1923, the SA was disbanded after the failed Munich Beer Hall Putsch. The group was re-founded two years later in 1925.

== Early SA rank insignia (1924–1929) ==
From 1923 to 1925, the SA did not officially exist since Hitler had been imprisoned for his actions in the Munich Putsch and the Nazi Party banned in Germany. Underground cells of SA men did continue to meet in secret, including one run by an SA leader named Gerhard Roßbach. It was Roßbach who effectively invented the "Nazi brownshirt" uniform since, during Roßbach's Austrian exile in 1924, a large store of military surplus brown denim shirts intended for tropical uniforms in East Africa, which were originally bought in 1921, was taken over by the Schill Youth in Germany. The "Schill Sportversand" then became the main supplier for the SA brown shirts.

In 1925, the SA was re-founded as part of the new Nazi Party which Hitler had put together following his release from prison. The reborn SA then received its first formal uniform regulations and also began using the first recognisable system of rank insignia.

Along with a brown shirt uniform, SA members would wear swastika armbands with a kepi cap. Originally, the SA used its pre-1923 rank titles, but this changed in 1926 when local SA units began to be grouped into larger regiment sized formations known as Standarten. Each SA regiment was commanded by a senior SA officer called a Standartenführer. At the same time, to differentiate from the SA rank and file, senior SA officers began to wear oak leaves on their collars to signify their authority. Under this system, a Standartenführer wore one oak leaf, an Oberführer two oak leaves, and the Supreme SA Commander wore three. The lower ranks of SA-Führer and SA-Mann still wore no insignia.

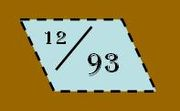
An SA unit insignia patch; here: Sturm 12/Standarte 93

In 1927, the officer rank of SA-Führer became known by the title of Sturmführer and a higher officer rank known as Sturmbannführer was created to be held by battalion formation commanders directly subordinate to the Standartenführer. In 1928, an expansion of SA enlisted ranks was required in response to the growing rank and file membership of the SA troopers. These new titles and ranks were denoted by an insignia system which consisted of silver pips pinned to a wearer's collar. The pip system was adopted from the Stahlhelm veteran's group which was closely connected to the SA both in dual membership and ideological design.

A further change in 1928 was the creation of the rank of Gruppenführer. This rank used the three leaf collar insignia previously reserved for the Supreme SA Commander and the rank was held by the senior most SA commanders in Germany who led division sized formations of several SA-Standarten. By this time, the SA had also begun to use unit insignia for its junior members which consisted of a numbered collar patch, showing both battalion and regiment affiliation, worn opposite the badge of rank. This unit insignia patch was worn by those holding the rank of Sturmbannführer and below; the higher officer ranks wore oak leaf insignia on both collars.

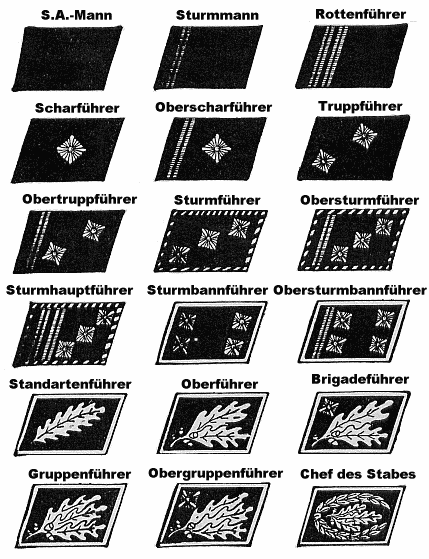
The original pip system used by the SA in 1935

By the end of the 1920s, the SA rank system had solidified into the following titles:

| SA rank | Reichswehr equivalent | UK equivalent |
|---|---|---|
| Gruppenführer | Generalleutnant | Lieutenant-general |
| Untergruppenführer | Generalmajor | Major general |
| Oberführer | No equivalent |
| Standartenführer | Oberst | Colonel |
| Sturmbannführer | Major | Major |
| Sturmhauptführer | Hauptmann | Captain |
| Sturmführer | Leutnant | Lieutenant |
| Truppführer | Feldwebel | Sergeant |
| Scharführer | Unteroffizier; Unterfeldwebel | Corporal |
| SA-Mann | Soldat | Private |

== SA uniforms under Ernst Röhm (1930–1933) ==
Early SA armband using the rank stripe system, here: Hundertschaftsführer of the SA

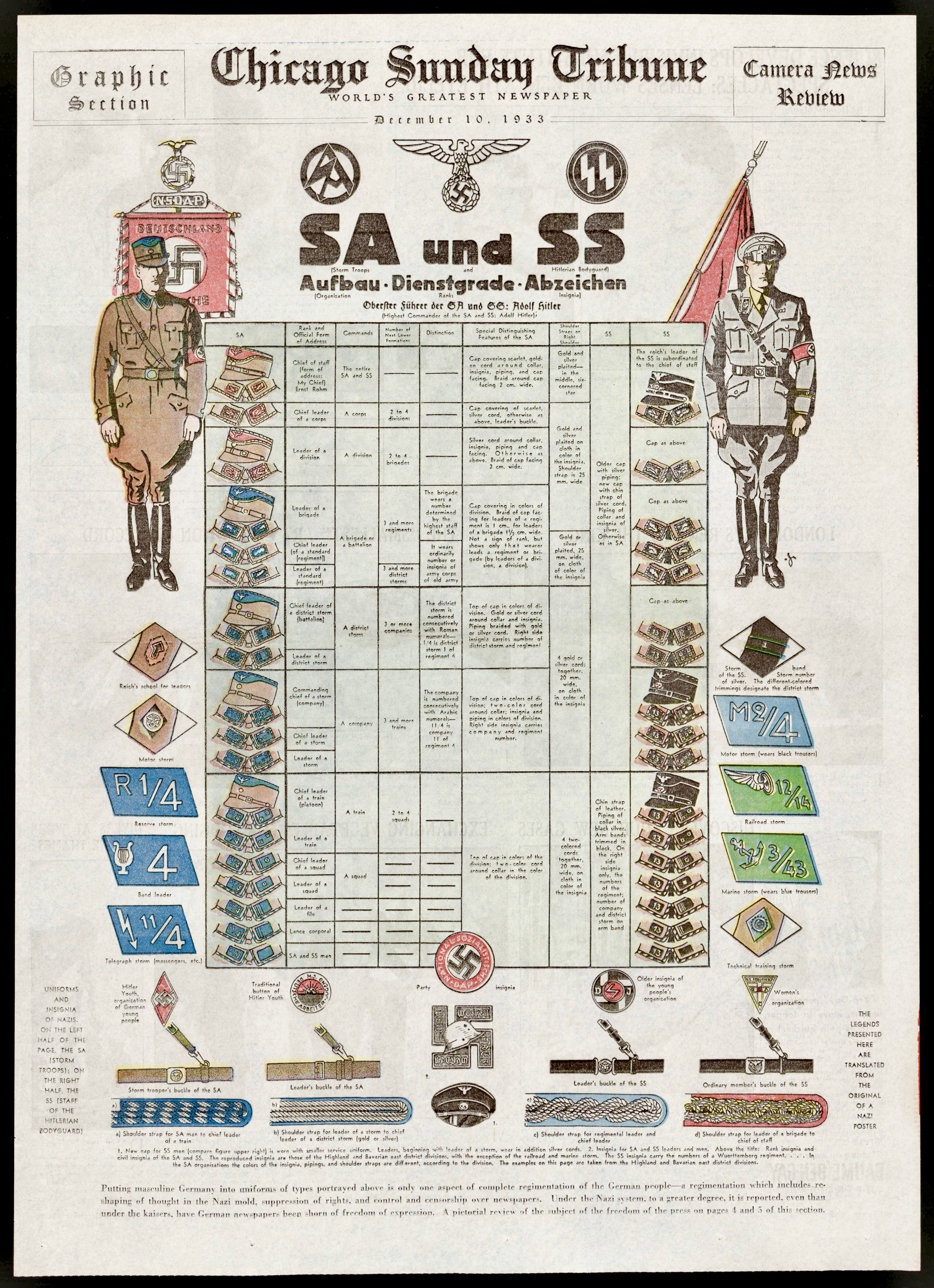
A German poster showing uniforms and insignia of Sturmabteilung (to the left) and Schutzstaffel (SS, to the right), two paramilitary branches of the Nazi Party, published in English by the Chicago Sunday Tribune 1933. The caption reads: Putting masculine Germany into uniforms of types portrayed above is only one aspect of complete regimentation of the German people – a regimentation which includes reshaping of thought in the Nazi mold, suppression of rights, and control and censorship over newspapers.

The next major change in SA uniforms and insignia occurred in 1930 when Ernst Röhm was appointed as Chief of Staff of the SA. Röhm's appointment was as the result of Hitler personally assuming command of the SA as the Oberster SA-Führer. Hitler would hold this title until the fall of Nazi Germany in 1945 and, after 1930, it was the SA Chief of Staff who was the effective leader of the organisation.

Röhm undertook several changes to the SA uniform and insignia design, the first being to invent several new ranks in order for the SA rank system to mirror that of the professional military. The rank expansion took place gradually between 1930 and 1932, with the final addition being the creation of a rank of SA-Obergruppenführer, which Röhm appointed to himself as well as senior SA-generals of the SA command staff. The new ranks used the same collar pip and oak leaf system as before, but with the addition of corded shoulder boards worn on the right shoulder for the officers. Further, the officers wore right shoulder cord of either gold or silver. In contrast, the enlisted men wore piping cords shaped as shoulder straps on the right shoulder.

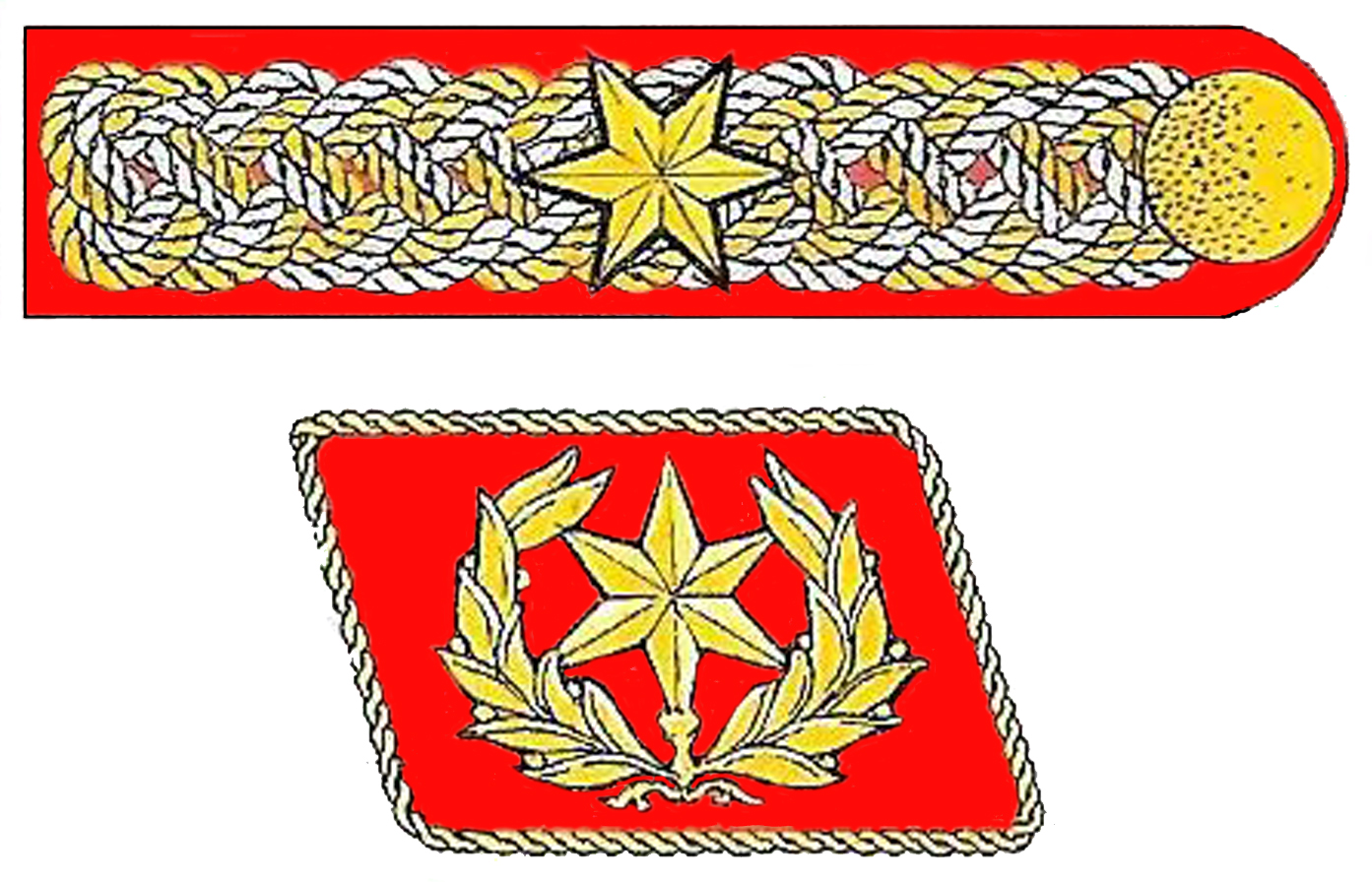
Ernst Röhm's special rank insignia as SA Chief of Staff, used between 1933 and 1934. It was abolished after the Night of the Long Knives.

In 1933, when Hitler became Chancellor of Germany, Röhm made his title of SA-Chief of Staff into an actual rank. The insignia for Röhm's new rank (known as Stabschef) consisted of a wreathed star which was designed after that of a Bolivian general, due to Röhm's previous military experience as a military adviser in Bolivia.

== Ranks and insignia ==
This table contains the final ranks and insignia of the SA, which were in use from 1942 to 1945.

| Insignia | | Title | Approximate equivalents during World War II | |
| Collar | Shoulder | Title | German Army | UK |
General officer ranks
| N/A | | Oberster Führer der SA; Supreme SA Leader | Reichsmarschall | |
| | | Chef des Stabes der SA; Chief of Staff SA | Generalfeldmarschall | Field Marshal |
| N/A | | | Generaloberst | General |
| | | SA-Obergruppenführer; SA-Senior group leader | General der Waffengattung | Lieutenant-general |
| | | SA-Gruppenführer; SA-Group leader | Generalleutnant | Major general |
| | | SA-Brigadeführer; SA-Brigade leader | Generalmajor | Brigadier |
Officer ranks
| | | SA-Oberführer; SA-Senior leader | —N/a | Colonel |
| | | SA-Standartenführer; SA-Standard leader (regiment sized unit) | Oberst | Colonel |
| | | SA-Obersturmbannführer; SA-Senior storm unit leader (battalion sized unit) | Oberstleutnant | Lieutenant colonel |
| | | SA-Sturmbannführer; SA-Storm unit leader | Major | Major |
| | | SA-Hauptsturmführer; SA-Chief storm leader (company sized sub unit) | Hauptmann/Rittmeister | Captain |
| | | SA-Obersturmführer; SA-Senior storm leader | Oberleutnant | Lieutenant |
| | | SA-Sturmführer; SA-Storm leader | Leutnant | Second lieutenant |
Non-Commissioned officer ranks
| | | SA-Haupttruppführer; SA-Chief troop leader (platoon sized unit) | Stabsfeldwebel | Sergeant major |
| | | SA-Obertruppführer; SA-Senior troop leader (platoon sized unit) | Oberfeldwebel | Sergeant major |
| | | SA-Truppführer; SA-Troop leader (platoon sized unit) | Feldwebel | Staff sergeant |
| | | SA-Oberscharführer; SA-Senior squad leader | Unterfeldwebel | Sergeant |
| | | SA-Scharführer; SA-Squad leader | Unteroffizier | Corporal |
Enlisted ranks
| N/A | | | Stabsgefreiter | Lance corporal |
| | | SA-Rottenführer; SA-Team leader (Fire team sized unit) | Obergefreiter | Lance corporal |
| | | SA-Sturmmann; SA-Storm man/Storm trooper | Gefreiter | Senior private |
| | | SA-Mann; SA-Man/SA-Trooper | Soldat | Private |
| SA-Anwärter; SA-Candidate | | | Conscript or military volunteer | —N/a |

Notable Collar Tabs

SA Sturmführer of the SA Staff Office

SA Sturmführer, Oberst SA Führungshauptamt Staff

SA Obersturmbannführer, SA Leadership School Instructor

SA Leadership School Student

SA Sturmbannführer of the Medical Command

SA Obersturmführer of the "SA Feldherrnhalle Regiment"

SA Mann from the "SA Feldherrnhalle Regiment"

Remarks

Right collar patch contains the number and type of unit (ascending up to "Obersturmbannführer" in the SA and SS, and "Oberstaffelfuehrer" in NSMC): ... Left collar patch contain the rank insignias (from ascending "Standartenführer" both sides).

=== Waffenfarben ===
Prior to 1932, when the Schutzstaffel wore the same uniform as the SA, black uniform colours also indicated membership in the SS; however, SS men wore all-black kepis and neckties, and (from 1929) black breeches and boots.

It was also during the 1930s that the SA began using uniform colours to denote an SA member's Gruppe (Division) to which the SA member belonged. The unit colour was worn on the front of the kepi cap as well as rank and unit collar patches. The marking system - patches/kepi colour combined with gold or silver buttons/pips - would eventually expand to cover these SA divisions; as of 1937:

Drawing of an SA trooper wearing red unit colours, indicating assignment to an SA Group Staff

- Crimson and Gold: SA Chief of Staff
- Carmine and Silver: SA Supreme Command and Standarte Feldherrnhalle
- Crimson and Silver: SA Group Staff
- Dark Maroon and Gold: Ostland Group (East Prussia and Free City of Danzig)
- Dark Maroon and Silver: Westfalen Group (Westphalia and Lippe)
- Black and Gold: Niederrhein Group (northern part of Rhine Province)
- Black and Silver: Berlin-Brandenburg Group (Berlin and western part of Brandenburg)
- Pink and Gold: Ostmark Group (Eastern part of Brandenburg)
- Apple Green and Gold: Pommern Group
- Apple Green and Silver: Thüringen Group
- Dark Brown and Gold: Westmark Group (parts of Rhine Province and Saar territory)
- Dark Brown and Silver: Niedersachsen Group (eastern part of Province of Hanover and Brunswick)
- Emerald and Gold: Sachsen Group
- Emerald and Silver: Nordmark Group (greater part of Schleswig-Holstein)
- Yellow Orange and Gold: Mitte Group (Province of Saxony and Anhalt)
- Yellow Orange and Silver: Südwest Group (Württemberg and greater part of Baden)
- Sulphur Yellow and Gold: Franken Group (parts of Northern and Western Bavaria)
- Sulphur Yellow and Silver: Schlesien Group
- Light Blue and Gold: Bayerische Ostmark Group (parts of Eastern and Northern Bavaria)
- Light Blue and Silver: Hochland Group (parts of Southern and Western Bavaria)
- Steel Green and Gold: Nordsee Group (Western part of Province of Hanover, Oldenburg, and Bremen)
- Steel Green and Silver: Kurpfalz Group (including parts of Hesse and Baden)
- Navy Blue and Gold: Hansa Group (Hamburg, Mecklenburg, southern part of Schleswig-Holstein)
- Navy Blue and Silver: Hessen Group (Hesse-Nassau and parts of Hesse)

| Insignia | | SA-Gruppe Name | Jurisdiction | Colors |
| Collar | Shoulder | SA-Gruppe Name | Jurisdiction | Colors |
|---|---|---|---|---|
| | | SA-Stabschef | SA High Command, Munich | Crimson and Gold |
| | | Oberste SA-Führung/ Standarte Feldherrnhalle | SA High Command, Munich | Carmine and Silver |
| | | SA-Gruppenstab | SA High Command, Munich | Crimson and Silver |
| | | SA-Gruppe Ostland | East Prussia and Free City of Danzig | Dark Maroon and Gold |
| | | SA-Gruppe Westfalen | Westphalia and Lippe | Dark Maroon and Silver |
| | | SA-Gruppe Niederrhein | Northern part of Rhine Province | Black and Gold |
| | | SA-Gruppe Berlin-Brandenburg | Berlin/Brandenburg Metropolitan Region | Black and Silver |
| | | SA-Gruppe Ostmark | Eastern part of Brandenburg | Pink and Gold |
| | | SA-Gruppe Pommern | Province of Pomerania | Apple Green and Gold |
| | | SA-Gruppe Thüringen | Thuringia | Apple Green and Silver |
| | | SA-Gruppe Westmark | Parts of Rhine Province and Saar Territory | Dark Brown and Gold |
| | | SA-Gruppe Niedersachsen | Eastern part of the Province of Hanover and Brunswick | Dark Brown and Silver |
| | | SA-Gruppe Sachsen | Saxony | Emerald and Gold |
| | | SA-Gruppe Nordmark | Greater part of Schleswig-Holstein | Emerald and Silver |
| | | SA-Gruppe Mitte | Province of Saxony and Anhalt | Yellow Orange and Gold |
| | | SA-Gruppe Südwest | Württemberg and the greater part of Baden | Yellow Orange and Silver |
| | | SA-Gruppe Franken | Parts of Northern and Western Bavaria | Sulphur Yellow and Gold |
| | | SA-Gruppe Schlesien | Silesia | Sulphur Yellow and Silver |
| | | SA-Gruppe Bayerische-Ostmark | Parts of Eastern and Northern Bavaria | Light Blue and Gold |
| | | SA-Gruppe Hochland | Parts of Southern and Western Bavaria | Light Blue and Silver |
| | | SA-Gruppe Nordsee | Western part of Province of Hanover, Oldenburg, and Bremen | Steel Green and Gold |
| | | SA-Gruppe Kurpfalz | Includes parts of Hesse and Baden | Steel Green and Silver |
| | | SA-Gruppe Hansa | Hamburg, Mecklenburg, southern part of Schleswig-Holstein | Navy Blue and Gold |
| | | SA-Gruppe Hessen | Hesse-Nassau and parts of Hesse | Navy Blue and Silver |

== Final pattern SA uniforms (1934–1945) ==
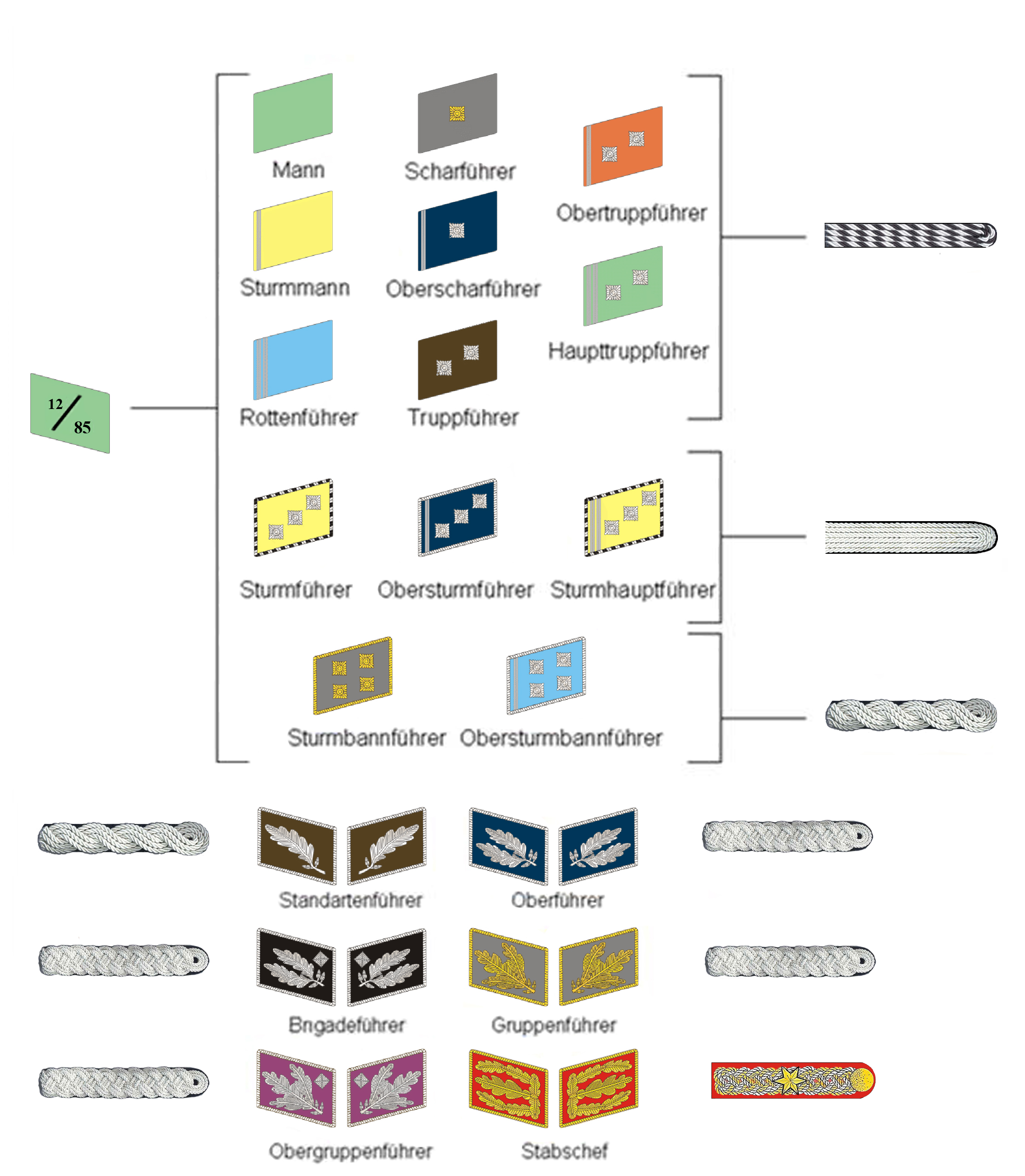
Final SA rank insignia pattern (1934–1945)

A slight alteration to the rank and insignia system of the SA occurred in July 1934 after the Night of the Long Knives. Viktor Lutze did away with Röhm's special insignia for the rank of Stabschef and instead adopted a collar patch in much the same design as that of Reichsführer-SS, a rank which Heinrich Himmler now held.

== Other uniforms ==
Even before the fall of Röhm, the SA had adopted a more formal appearance to its uniforms in an effort to make the group appear as an actual military formation rather than a group of street fighters. To this end, the SA had created a formal "office" type uniform, which consisted of a brown coat worn over the basic brown shirt uniform.

Special uniforms also existed for corps of the SA, such as the motorised SA, the SA Alpine troops, and the SA-Marine, considered an auxiliary of the Kriegsmarine. It was the SA-Marine that expanded its uniforms almost to a level unto themselves, with special nautical insignia which no other unit of the SA displayed.

== Sleeves ==
The SA used several sleeve insignias to indicate party affiliation.

Early SA Veteran Medal of Honor

The SA Veteran Badge, introduced in February 1934, consisted of a brown cotton base with an inverted triangle and a gold braid of aluminum wire sewn onto it, with two thin red cords spaced approximately one centimetre apart. It was awarded to all SA members with membership numbers below 300,000 who had belonged to the Nazi Party before January 30, 1933, when the Nazi Party came to power, and was worn by soldiers and officers alike, regardless of rank.

However, as early as September 1934, the insignia was changed to a tape-type sash, and several sashes of different widths were worn on both cuffs of the uniform jacket depending on the year of enlistment.

There were also cuff titles bearing the names of specific organizations or units, which were worn by each member of that unit.

Cuff title of the SA Supreme Leader

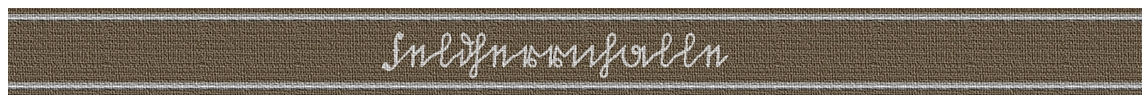
Cuff title of the SA Guards Regiment "Feldherrnhalle"

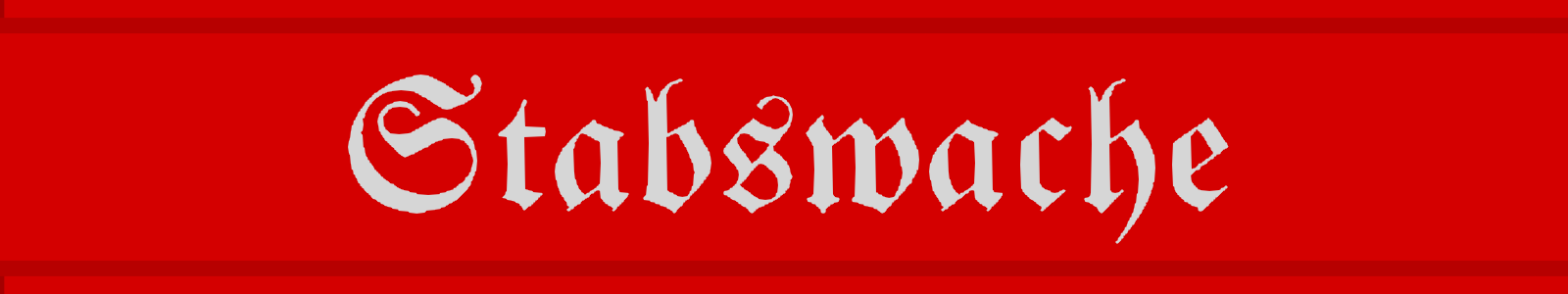
Cuff title of SA 1st Guards Battalion "Berlin"

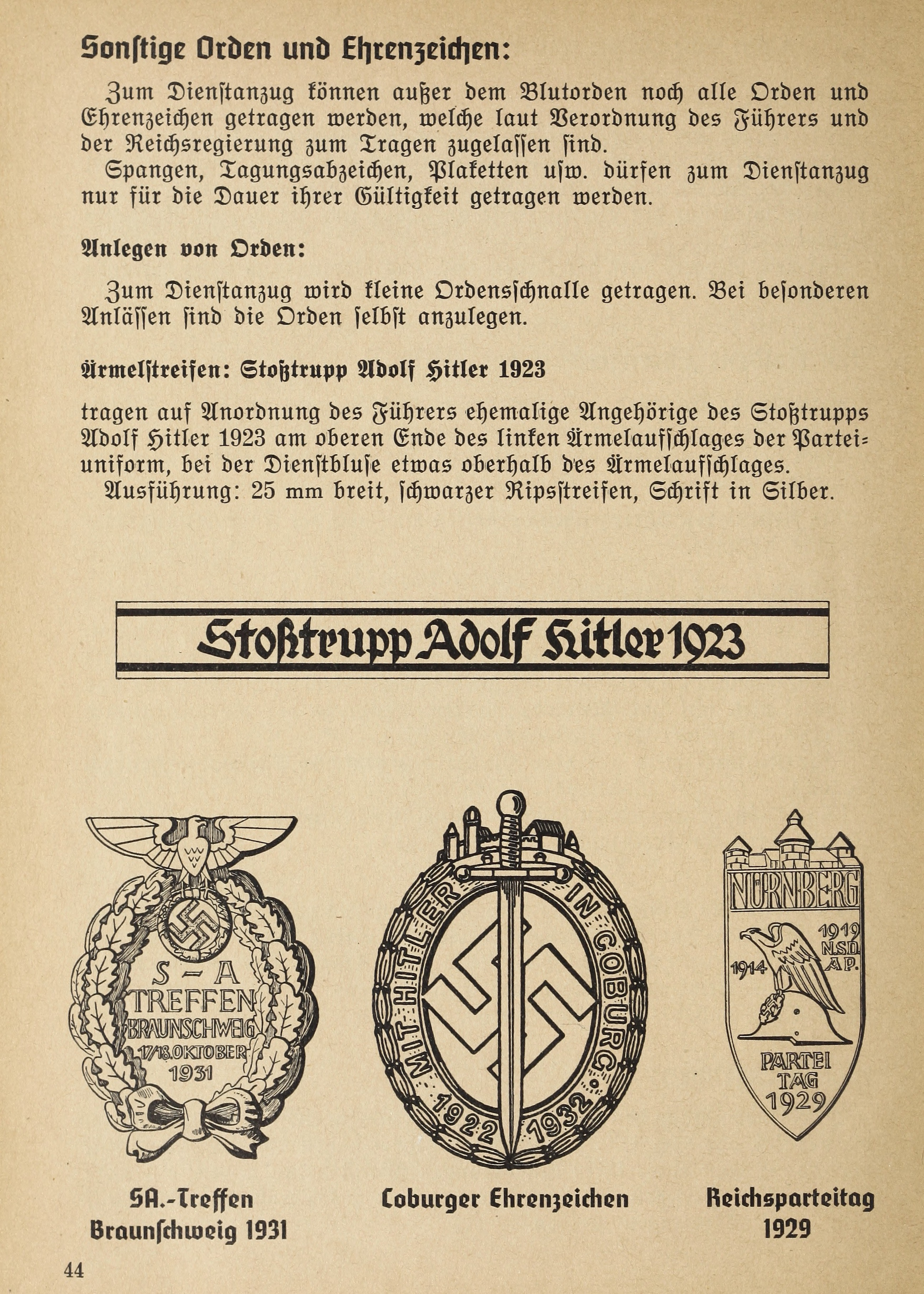
Cuff title of the "Honorary Member of the 'Adolf Hitler Special Attack Unit' Medal" (center)

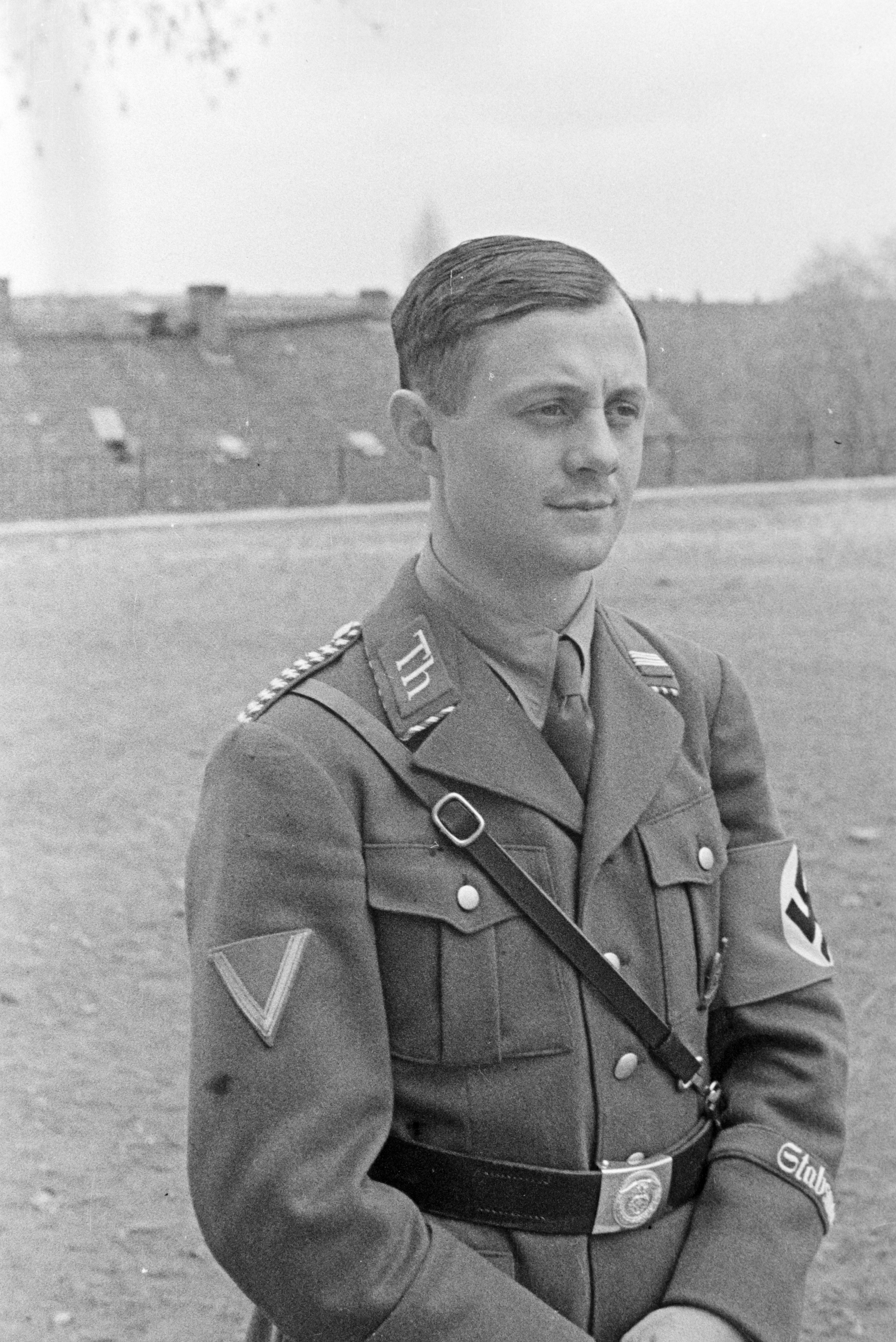
SA group leader from the Thuringian SA collective leadership, wearing the veteran medal on his right arm

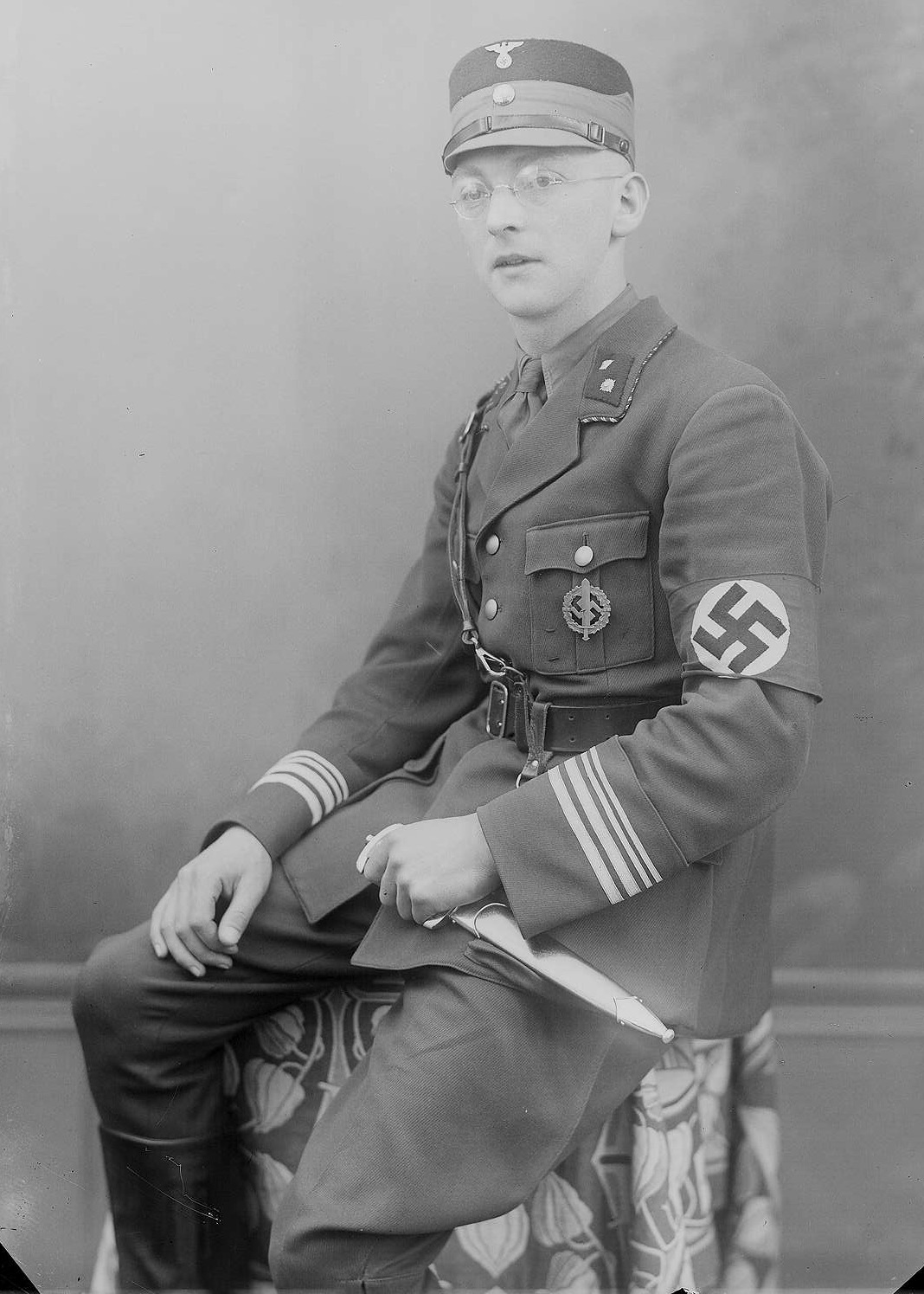
SA platoon leader with a tape-type veterans' sleeve insignia on the cuff

The SA had a specialization badge on the left sleeve, similar to the military. These usually had runic insignia. The SA instructor school graduates had their sleeve insignia attached higher up on the arm than the swastika armband on the left sleeve.

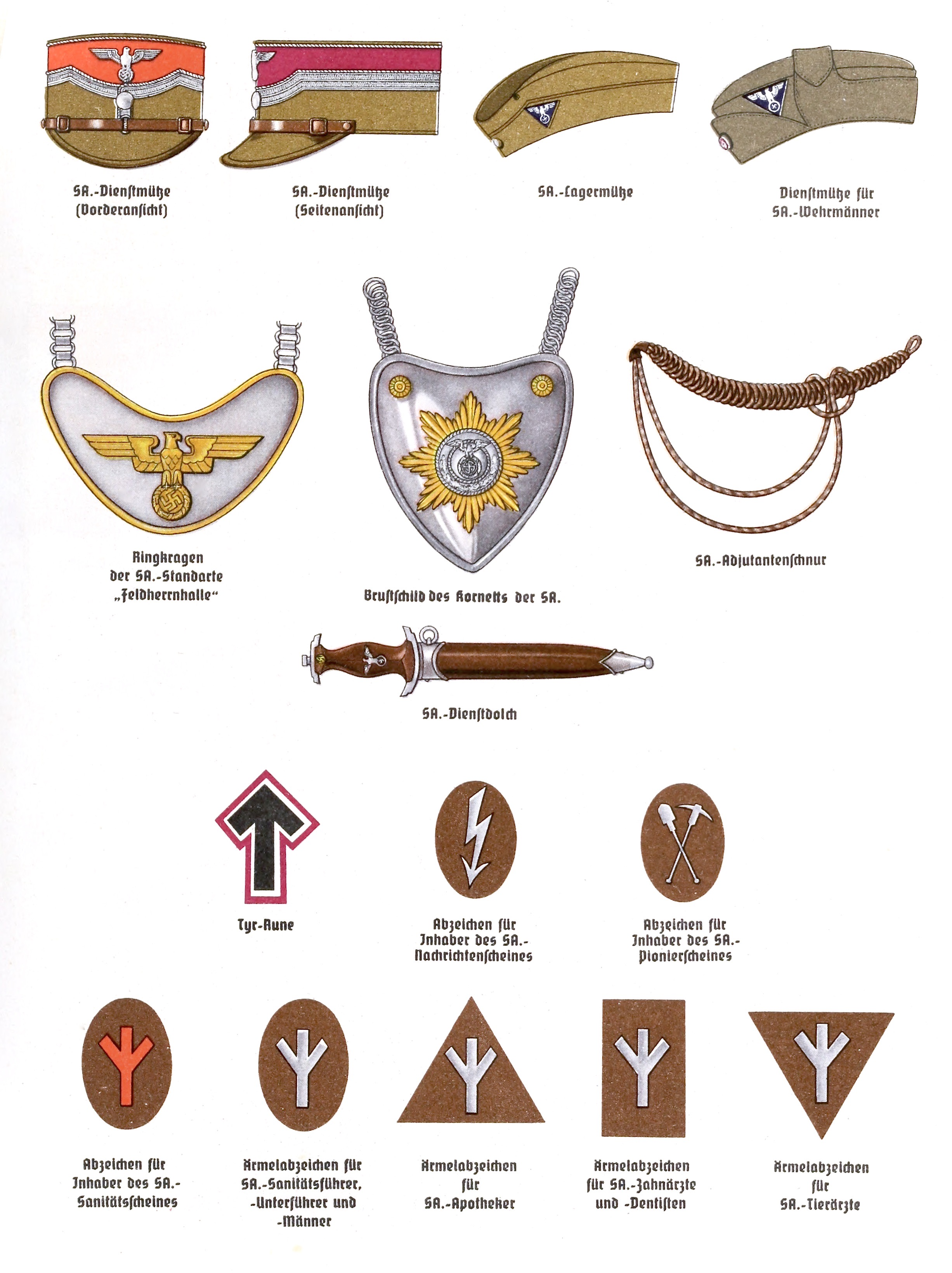
Early SA Veteran Medal of Honor

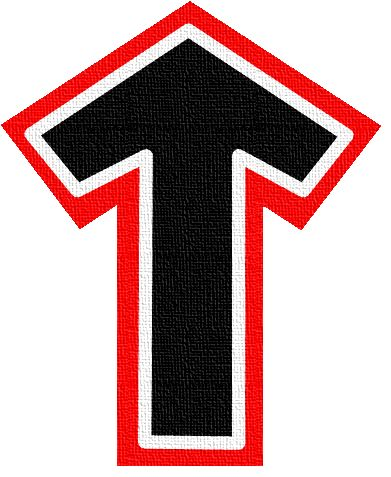
SA Leadership School graduation badge featuring the Tyr rune

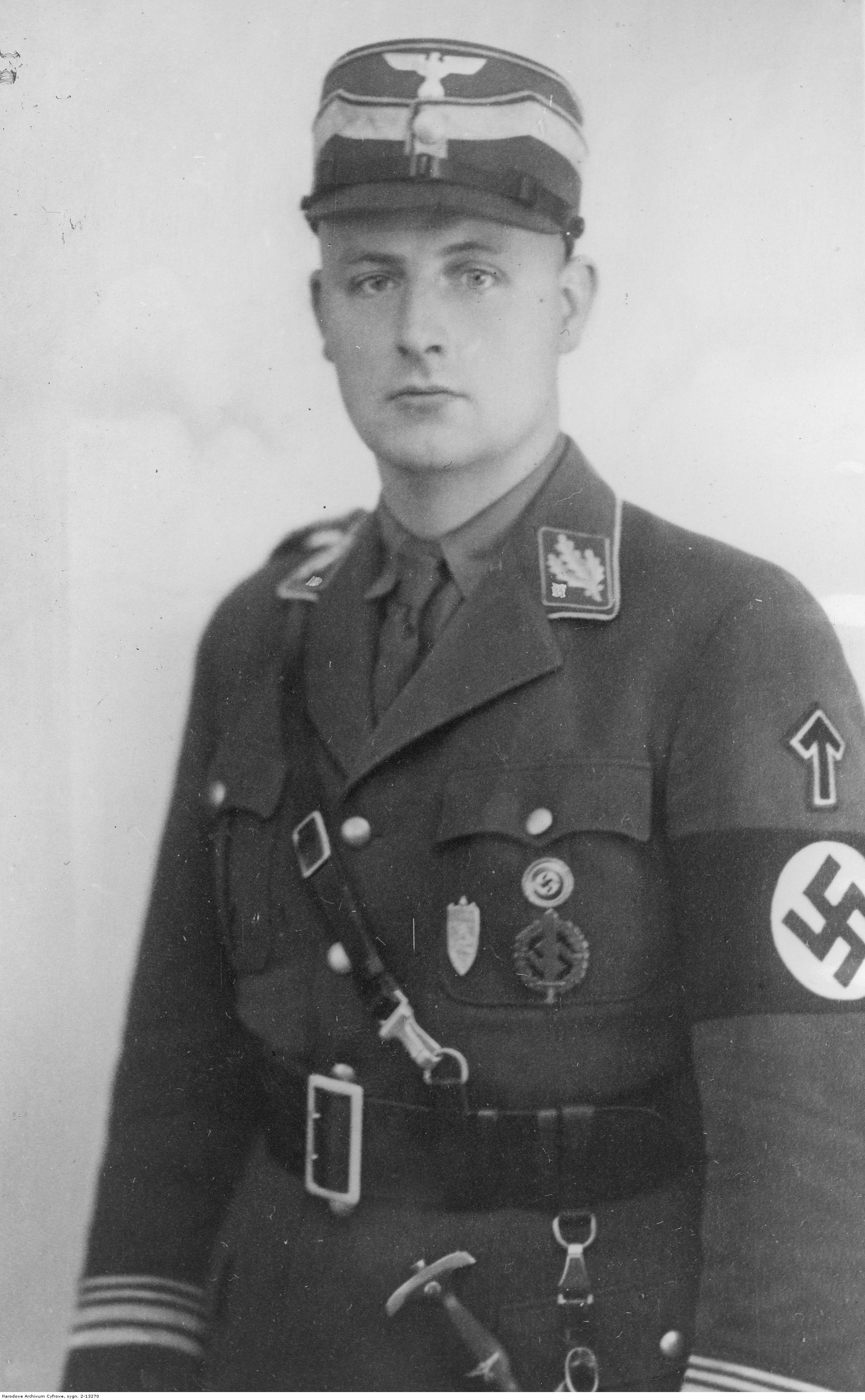
Example of SA Instructor School graduation sleeve badge

== Gallery ==
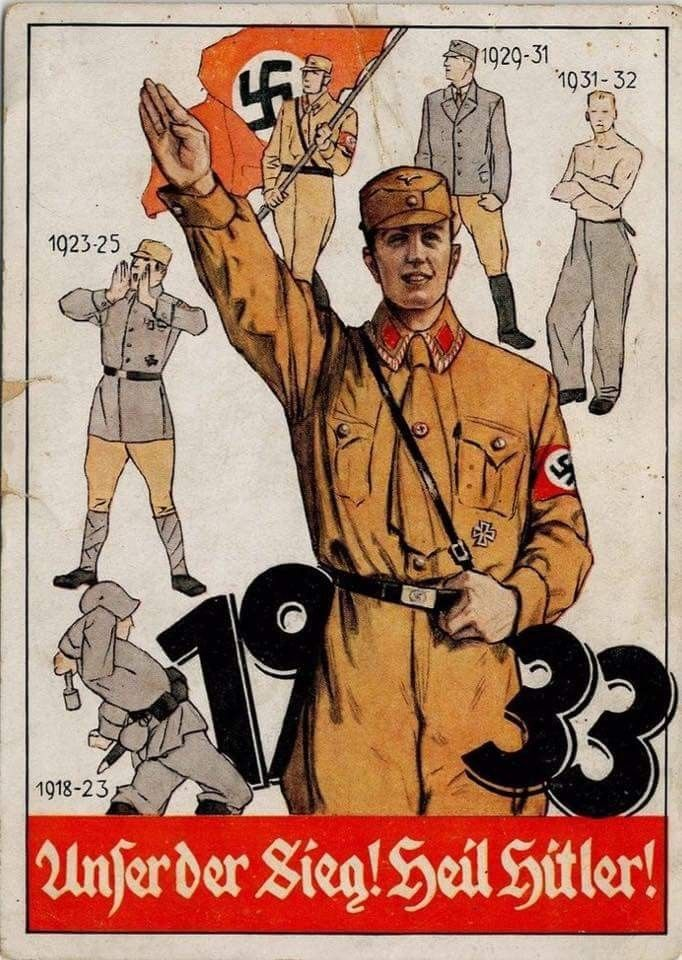
Propaganda poster showing SA uniforms from the Freikorps movements after World War I, through the party ban 1923–25, the uniform ban 1930–1931 up to 1933 when Adolf Hitler became Chancellor

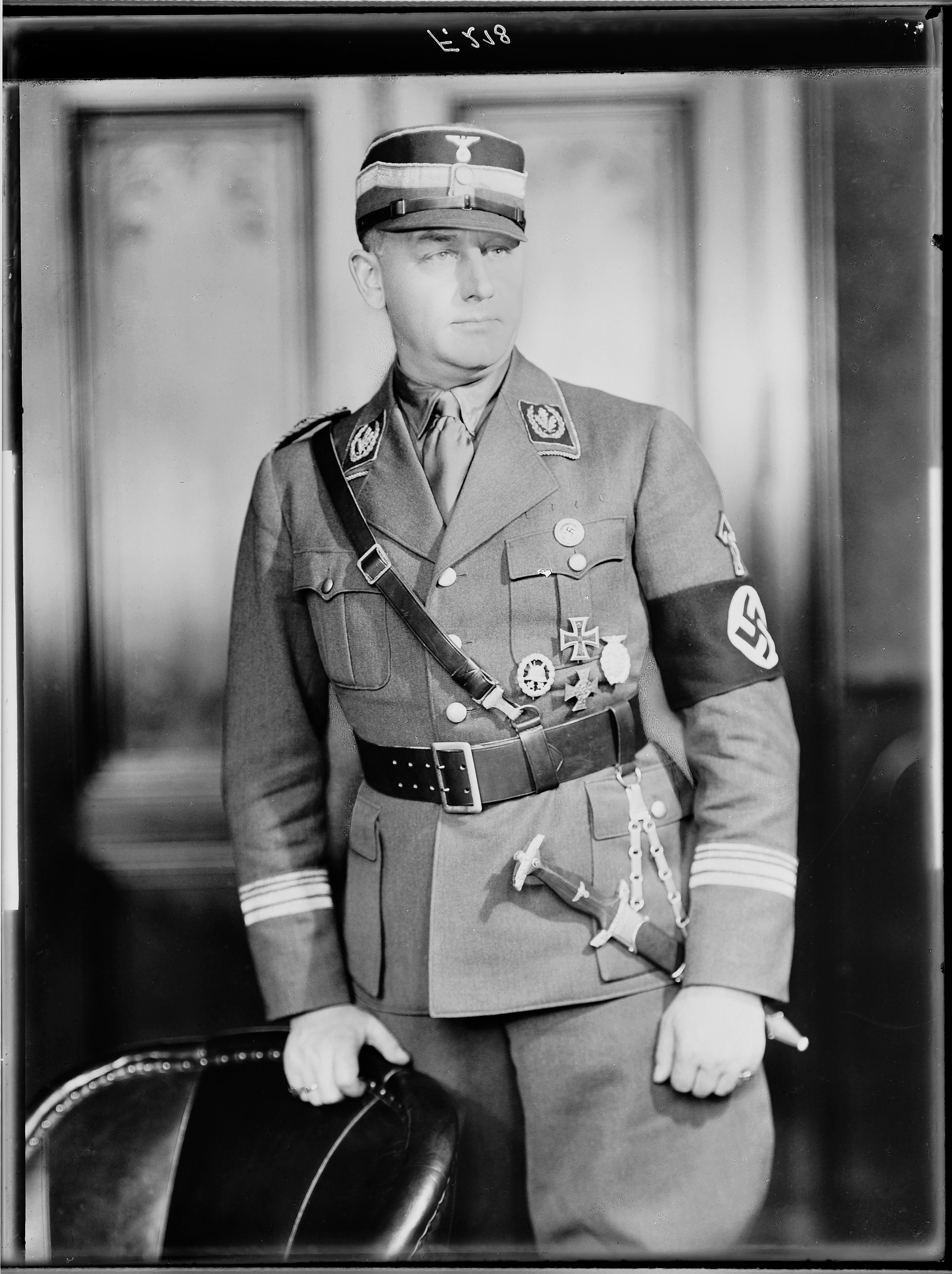
SA leader Viktor Lutze in uniform, 1934

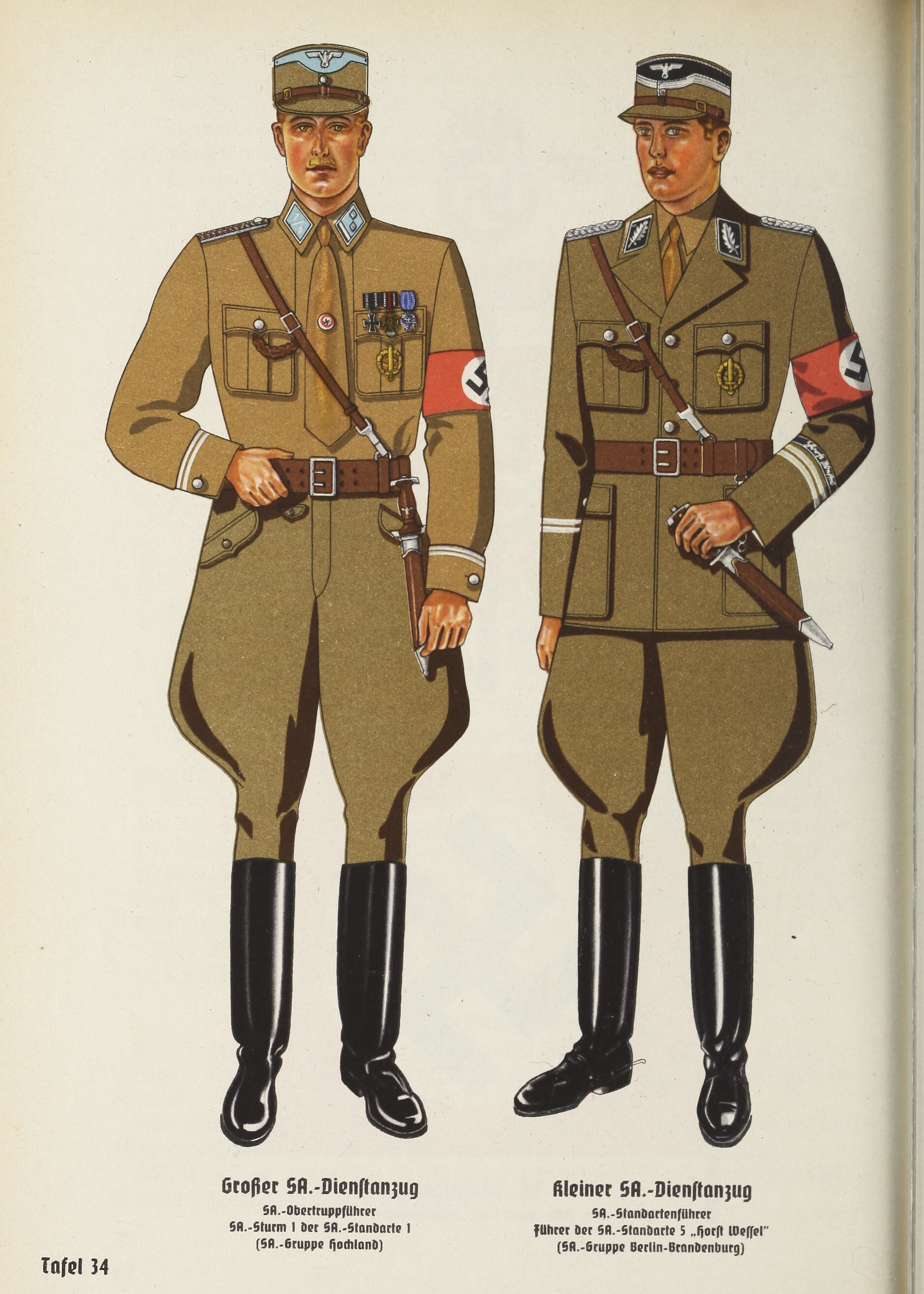
SA uniforms in 1943 (Organisationsbuch der NSDAP)

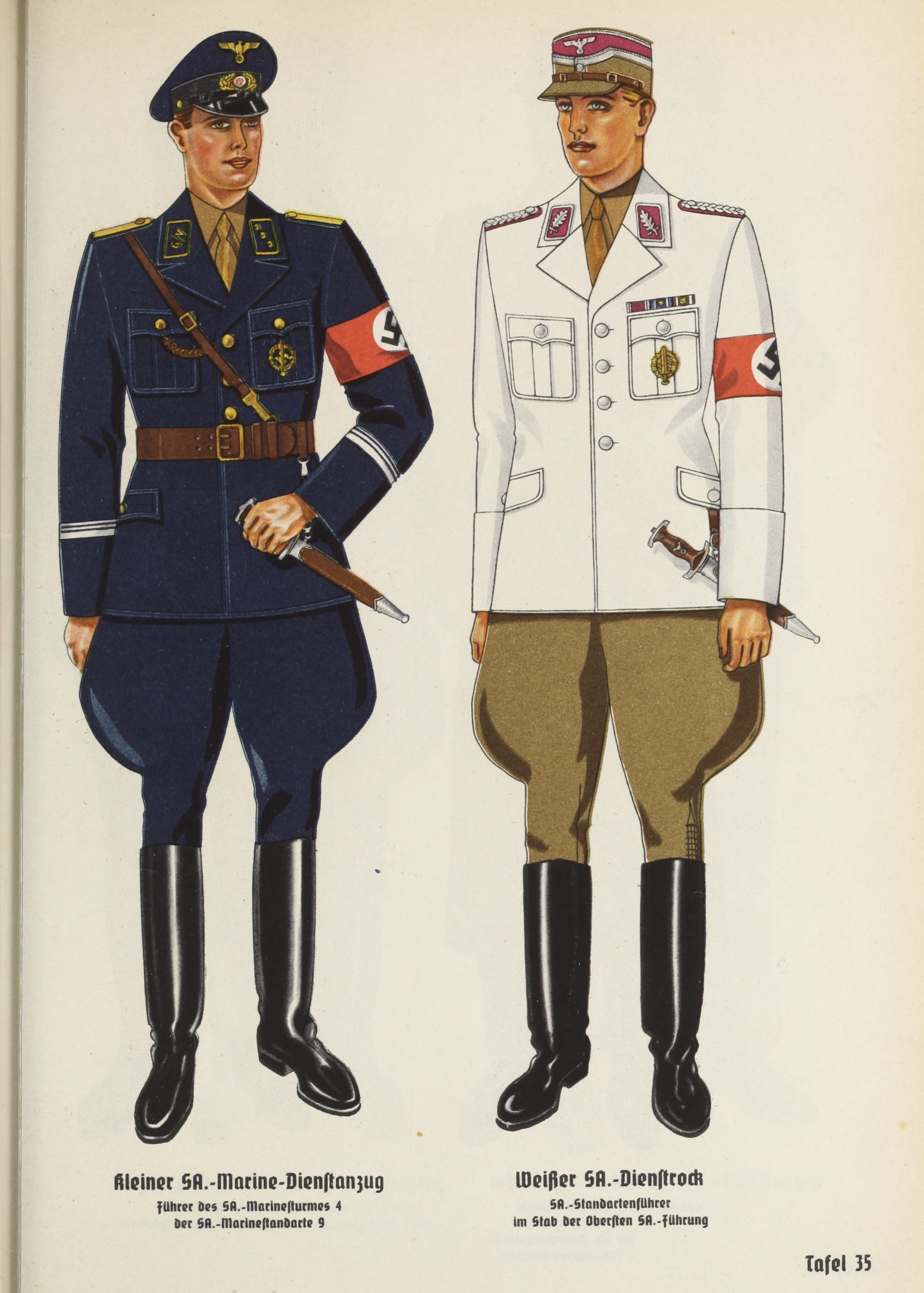
SA uniforms in 1943 (Organisationsbuch der NSDAP)

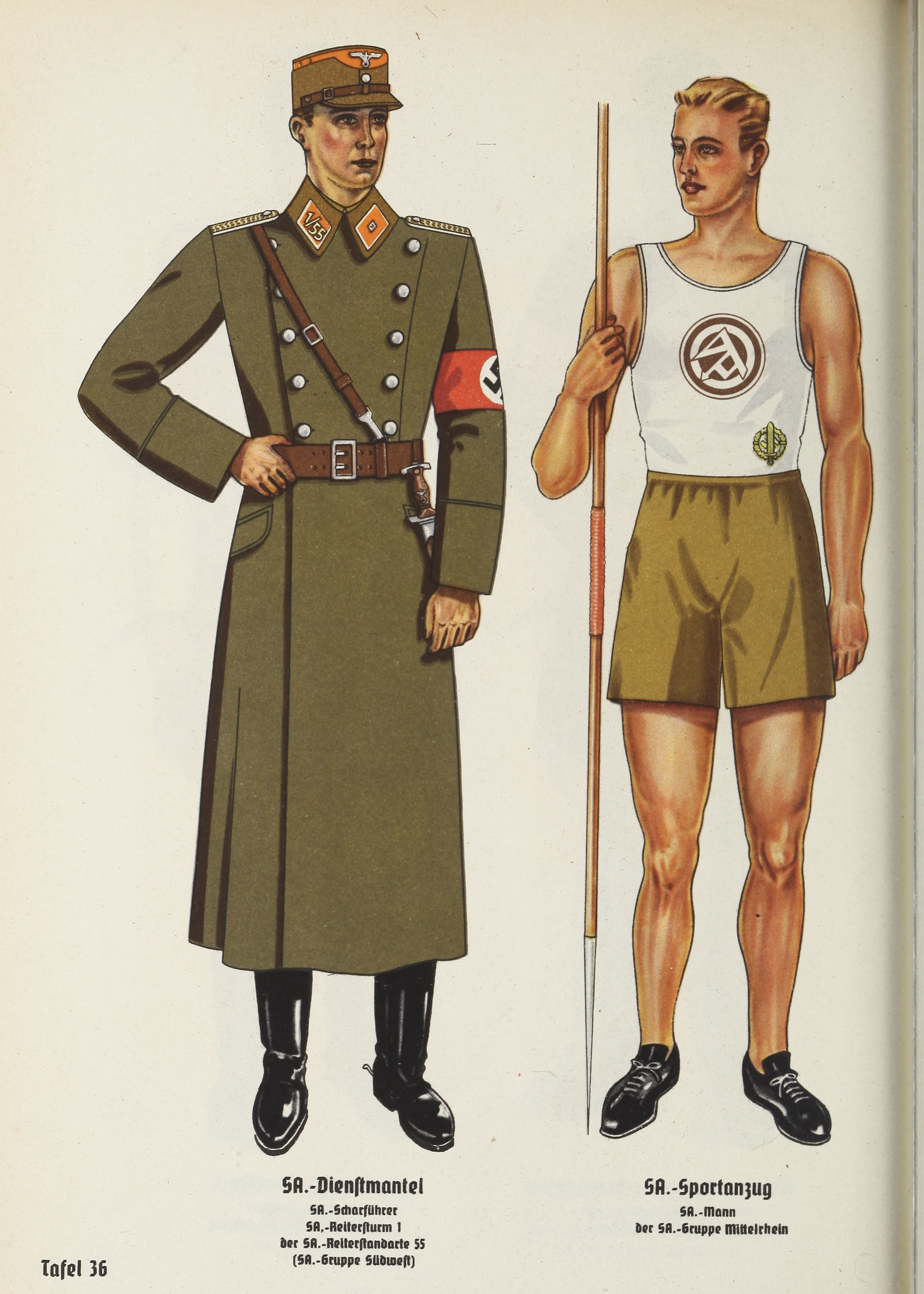
SA uniforms in 1943 (Organisationsbuch der NSDAP)

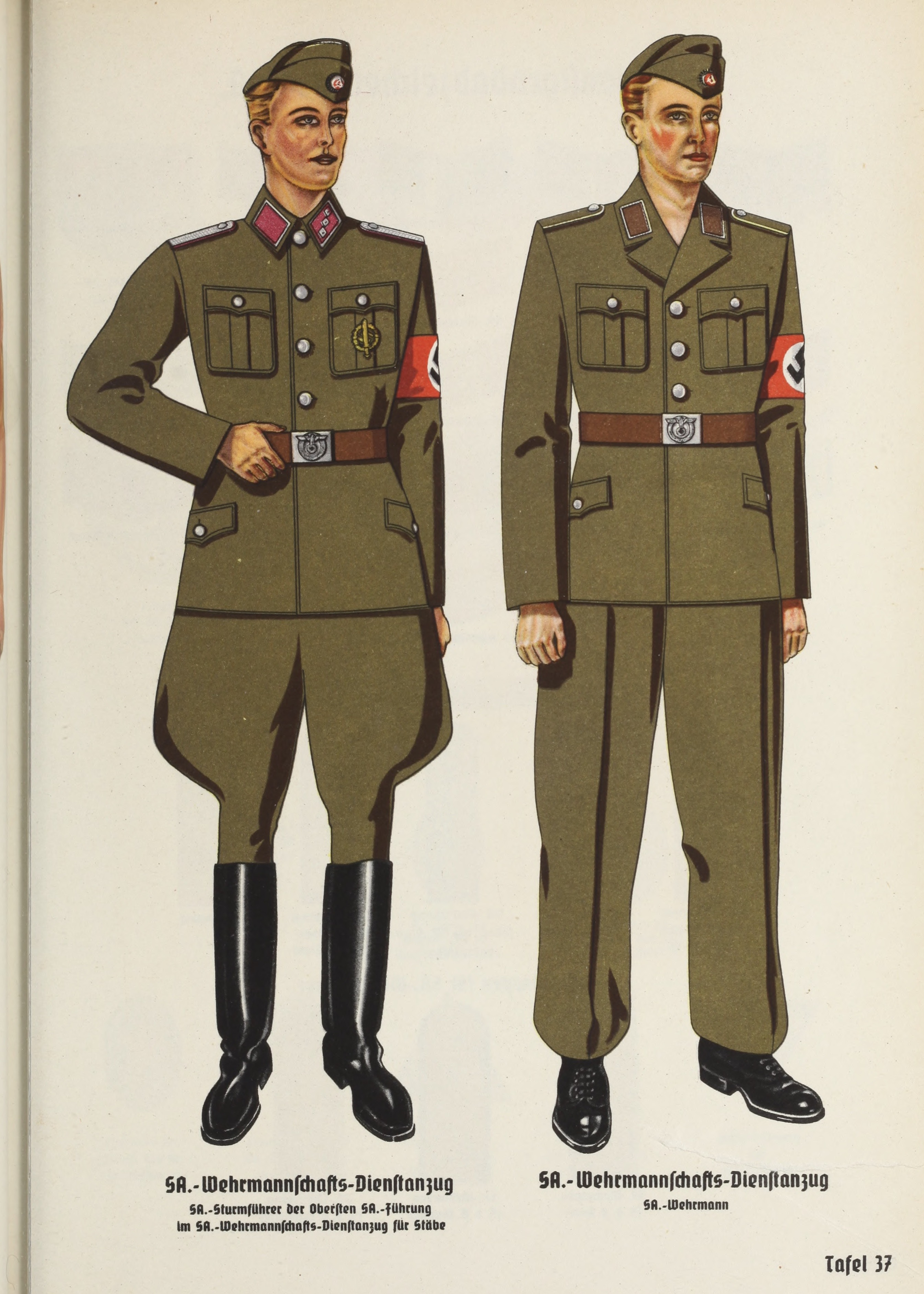
SA uniforms in 1943 (Organisationsbuch der NSDAP)

== See also ==
- Comparative military ranks of World War II
- Corps colours of the Sturmabteilung
- Nazi Germany paramilitary ranks
- Ranks and insignia of the German Army in World War II
- Ranks and insignia of the National Socialist Motor Corps
- Ranks and insignia of the Nazi Party
- Ranks and insignia of the Reichsluftschutzbund
- Ranks and insignia of the Schutzstaffel

== Bibliography ==
- Angolia, John R. (1985). Cloth Insignia of the NSDAP and SA. R. James Bender Publishing. ISBN 0-912138-33-5.
- Bedurftig, Friedemann, and Zenter, Christian. The Encyclopedia of the Third Reich. 1985.
- CIA (24 August 1999). "Records Integration Title Book" (PDF). Archived from the original (PDF) on January 23, 2017.
- Hayes, A. SS Uniforms, Insignia and Accoutrements. Schiffer Publishing, Ltd. 2000. ISBN 978-0-7643-0046-2
- Verlag Moritz Ruhl (1936). Deutsche Uniformen (in German). Leipzig: Verlag Moritz Ruhl.
