= Sturmbannführer =

Paramilitary officer's rank in Nazi Germany

- SS Gorget patches
- Country: Germany
- Service branch: Schutzstaffel; Sturmabteilung; National Socialist Motor Corps; National Socialist Flyers Corps
- Abbreviation: Stubaf
- NATO rank code: OF-3
- Formation: 1921
- Abolished: 1945
- Next higher rank: Obersturmbannführer
- Next lower rank: Hauptsturmführer
- Equivalent ranks: Major

Sturmbannführer (German: [ˈʃtʊʁmbanˌfyːʁɐ]; lit. 'assault unit leader') was a Nazi Party paramilitary rank equivalent to major that was used in several Nazi organizations, such as the SA, SS, and the NSFK. The rank originated from German shock troop units of the First World War.

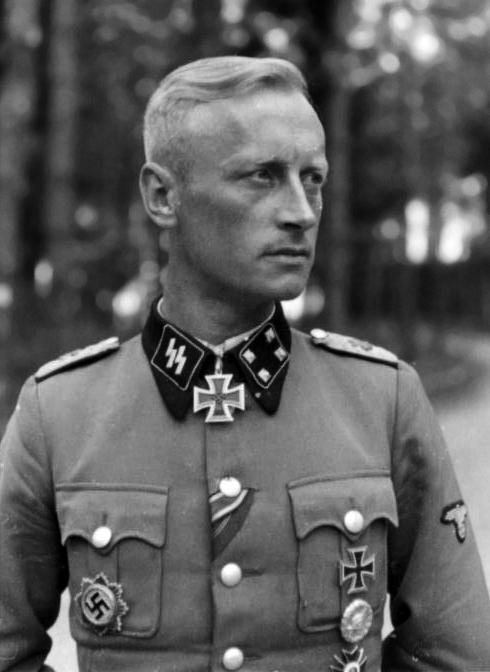
Max Hansen, Sturmbannführer of the Waffen-SS

The SA title of Sturmbannführer was first established in 1921. In 1928, the title became an actual rank and was also one of the first established SS ranks. The insignia of a Sturmbannführer was four silver pips centered on a collar patch. The rank rated below Standartenführer until 1932, when Sturmbannführer became subordinate to the new rank of Obersturmbannführer. In the Waffen-SS, Sturmbannführer was considered equivalent to a major in the German Wehrmacht.

Various Waffen-SS units composed of foreign recruits were considered distinct from the German SS, and thus they were not permitted to wear SS runes on their collar tabs but had their divisional insignia instead. Their ranks were also prepended with "Waffen" instead of "SS", as in, Waffen-Sturmbannführer.

The rank was held by Wernher von Braun, who developed the V-2 rocket, and later designed the Saturn V rocket for the U.S. space program. Other rank holders included Eberhard Heder, Otto Günsche, and war criminals, such as Otto Förschner, who was the commandant of Dora-Mittelbau concentration camp.

== Rank insignia ==
Sturmbannführer SS, SA, NSKK, and NSFK
Rank insignia: Shoulder insignia; Camo insignia; Gorget patch	Schutzstaffel (SS)		Sturmabteilung (SA)	NS Motor Corps (NSKK)	NS Flyers Corps (NSFK)
Rank insignia: Shoulder insignia; Camo insignia; Gorget patch	Waffen-SS	Allgemeine-SS; Waffen-SS	collar insignia

Sequence of ranks in comparison with the Wehrmacht (Heer)
Junior rank Hauptsturmführer (until 1939/40: Sturmhauptführer)	SA rank Sturmbannführer	Senior rank Obersturmbannführer
Junior rank Hauptsturmführer (until 1934: Sturmhauptführer)	SS rank Sturmbannführer	Senior rank Obersturmbannführer
Junior rank Hauptmann / Rittmeister	Wehrmacht rank Major	Senior rank Oberstleutnant

== See also ==
- Table of ranks and insignia of the Waffen-SS

== Bibliography ==
- Flaherty, T. H. (2004) [1988]. The Third Reich: The SS. Time-Life Books, Inc. ISBN 1-84447-073-3.
- Joachimsthaler, Anton (1999) [1995]. The Last Days of Hitler: The Legends, the Evidence, the Truth. Trans. Helmut Bögler. London: Brockhampton Press. ISBN 978-1-86019-902-8.
- McNab, Chris (2009). The SS: 1923–1945. Amber Books Ltd. ISBN 978-1-906626-49-5.
- McNab, Chris (2009b). The Third Reich. Amber Books Ltd. ISBN 978-1-906626-51-8.
- Stein, George (1984) [1966]. The Waffen-SS: Hitler's Elite Guard at War 1939–1945. Cornell University Press. ISBN 0-8014-9275-0.
