= Untergruppenführer =

Rank in the Sturmabteilung

Rank insignia poster of the SA and SS showing the position of Untergruppenführer

Untergruppenführer (Sub group leader) was a rare and short lived rank of the Sturmabteilung which existed in the SA for a few months in late 1929 and 1930. The rank was created as an intermediary position between the ranks of SA-Oberführer and SA-Gruppenführer. The rank was held by those Oberführer who were selected to command the early SA-brigades and SA-Untergruppen first formed in 1929. There was no prescribed insignia for those holding the rank, with the Untergruppenführer continuing to wear the uniform of an SA-Oberführer.

The rank of Untergruppenführer was replaced by SA-Brigadeführer in 1931 but continued as an "ad hoc" title in the SA until 1933.
