= Obersturmführer =

Paramilitary officer's rank in Nazi Germany

- SS collar patches
- Country: Nazi Germany
- Service branch: Schutzstaffel; Sturmabteilung; National Socialist Motor Corps; National Socialist Flyers Corps
- Abbreviation: Ostuf
- NATO rank code: OF-1
- Formation: 1932
- Abolished: 1945
- Next higher rank: Hauptsturmführer
- Next lower rank: Untersturmführer
- Equivalent ranks: Oberleutnant

SS-Obersturmführer

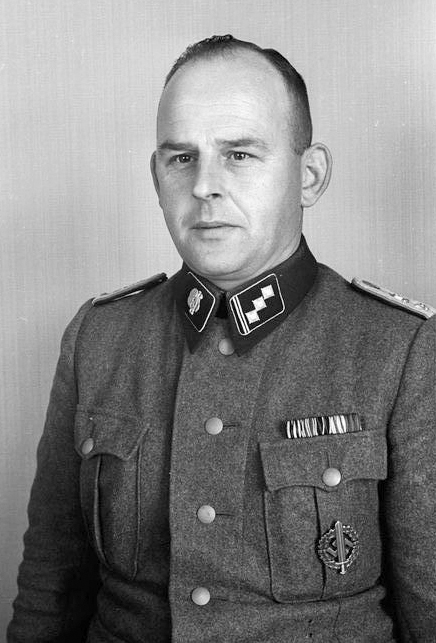
Franz Abromeit serving in KZ Mauthausen

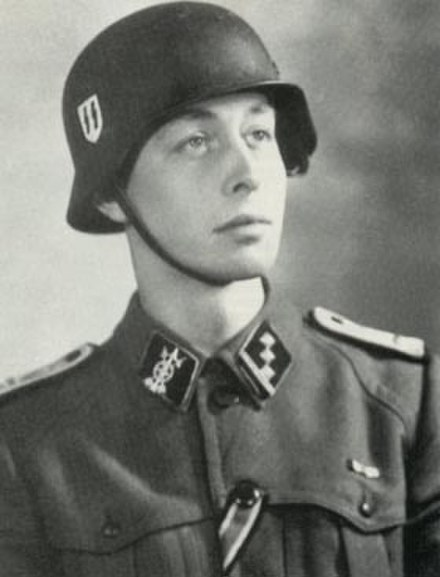
Pio Filippani Ronconi in the uniform of a foreign volunteer of the Waffen-SS

Obersturmführer (German: [ˈoːbɐʃtʊʁmˌfyːʁɐ], lit. 'Senior storm leader'; short: Ostuf) was a Nazi Germany paramilitary rank that was used in several Nazi organisations, such as the SA, SS, NSKK and the NSFK.

The rank of Obersturmführer was first created in 1932 as the result of an expansion of the Sturmabteilung (SA) and the need for an additional rank in the officer corps. Obersturmführer also became an SS rank at that same time.

An SA-Obersturmführer was typically a junior company commander in charge of fifty to a hundred men. Within the SS, the rank of Obersturmführer carried a wider range of occupations including staff aide, Gestapo officer, concentration camp supervisor, and Waffen-SS platoon commander. Within both the SS and SA, the rank of Obersturmführer was considered the equivalent of an Oberleutnant in the German Wehrmacht.

The insignia for Obersturmführer was three silver pips and a silver stripe centered on a uniform collar patch. The rank was senior to an Untersturmführer (or Sturmführer in the SA) and junior to the rank of Hauptsturmführer.

== Rank insignia ==
Obersturmführer SS, SA, NSKK, and NSFK
Rank insignia: Shoulder insignia; Camo insignia; Gorget patch	Schutzstaffel (SS)		Sturmabteilung (SA)	NS Motor Corps (NSSKK)	NS Flyers Corps (NSFK)
Rank insignia: Shoulder insignia; Camo insignia; Gorget patch	Waffen-SS	Allgemeine-SS; Waffen-SS	collar insignia

Sequence of ranks in comparison with Wehrmacht
junior rank SS-Untersturmführer	SS Rank; Obersturmführer	senior rank: SS-Hauptsturmführer; Sturmhauptführer (until 1934)
SA-Sturmführer	SA Rank; Obersturmführer	SA-Hauptsturmführer; Sturmhauptführer (until 1939/40)
Leutnant (OF-1b)	Wehrmacht rank Oberleutnant (OF-1a)	Hauptmann / Rittmeister (OF-2)

== See also ==
- Comparative ranks of Nazi Germany
- Table of ranks and insignia of the Waffen-SS

== Bibliography ==
- Flaherty, T. H. (2004) [1988]. The Third Reich: The SS. Time-Life Books, Inc. ISBN 1-84447-073-3.
- McNab, Chris (2009). The SS: 1923–1945. Amber Books Ltd. ISBN 978-1-906626-49-5.
- McNab, Chris (2009b). The Third Reich. Amber Books Ltd. ISBN 978-1-906626-51-8.
- Stein, George (1984) [1966]. The Waffen-SS: Hitler's Elite Guard at War 1939–1945. Cornell University Press. ISBN 0-8014-9275-0.
