= Sturmführer =

Paramilitary rank of the Nazi Party

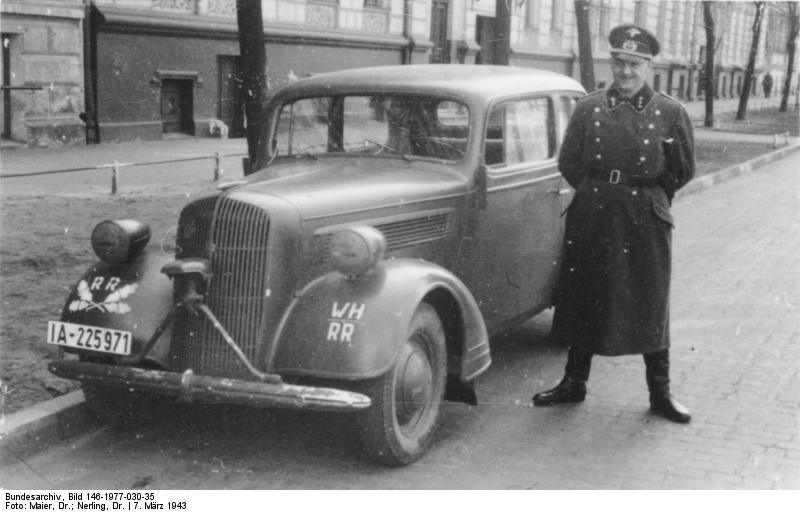
Sturmführer Zwiebel of the National Socialist Motor Corps (NSKK) in Riga, 1943; note the three pips on his gorget patch

Sturmführer ([ˈʃtʊʁm.fyːʀɐ], "storm leader") was a paramilitary rank of the Nazi Party which began as a title used by the Sturmabteilung (SA) in 1925 and became an actual SA rank in 1928. Translated as "storm leader" or "assault leader", the origins of the rank dated to the First World War when the title of Sturmführer was used by leaders of German shock troops and special action companies.

By 1930, Sturmführer had become the lowest commissioned officer (CO) rank of several Nazi Party paramilitary organizations, including the SA. The title was also used as an SS rank until 1934 when after the Night of the Long Knives the SS renamed the rank Untersturmführer, which was the equivalent to a second lieutenant in other military organizations.

== Insignia ==
SA Gorget patches

NSFK Gorget patch

NSKK Gorget patch

Sequence of ranks in comparison with Wehrmacht (Heer)
Allgemeine SS/Waffen-SS; SS-Hauptscharführer	junior rank Waffen SS only SS-Sturmscharführer	Rank SS; Untersturmführer	senior rank SS-Obersturmführer
SA-Haupttruppführer		Rank SA; Sturmführer	SA-Obersturmführer
Oberfeldwebel (OR-7)	Stabsfeldwebel (OR-8)	Wehrmacht rank Leutnant (OF-1b)	Oberleutnant (OF-1a)

== See also ==
- Comparative ranks of Nazi Germany

== Bibliography ==
- Flaherty, T. H. (2004) [1988]. The Third Reich: The SS. Time-Life Books, Inc. ISBN 1-84447-073-3.
- McNab, Chris (2009). The SS: 1923–1945. Amber Books Ltd. ISBN 978-1-906626-49-5.
- McNab, Chris (2009b). The Third Reich. Amber Books Ltd. ISBN 978-1-906626-51-8.
