= Gruppenführer =

General's rank in the Schutzstaffel (SS)

- Post April 1942 gorget patch

- Shoulder and camo insignia
- Country: Nazi Germany
- Service branch: Schutzstaffel; Sturmabteilung; National Socialist Motor Corps; National Socialist Flyers Corps
- Abbreviation: Gruf
- Rank: Two-Star
- NATO rank code: OF-7
- Non-NATO rank: O-8
- Formation: 1925
- Abolished: 1945
- Next higher rank: Obergruppenführer
- Next lower rank: Brigadeführer
- Equivalent ranks: Generalleutnant

Gruppenführer ([ˈɡʁʊpm̩fyːʁɐ], lit. 'Group leader') was an early paramilitary rank of the Nazi Party (NSDAP), first created in 1925 as a senior rank of the SA. Since then, the term Gruppenführer is also used for leaders of groups/teams of the police, fire departments, military and several other organizations.

== History ==
In 1930, Gruppenführer became an SS rank and was originally bestowed upon those officers who commanded SS-Gruppen and also upon senior officers of the SS command staff. In 1932, the SS was reorganized and the SS-Gruppen were reformed into SS-Abschnitte. A Gruppenführer commanded an SS-Abschnitt while a new rank, that of Obergruppenführer, oversaw the SS-Oberabschnitte which were the largest SS units in Germany.

Initially in the SA, NSKK, and SS, the rank of Gruppenführer was considered equivalent to a full general, but became regarded as equivalent to Generalleutnant after 1934. During the Second World War, when the Waffen-SS began using the rank, an SS-Gruppenführer was considered equal to a Generalleutnant in the Wehrmacht and was referred to as SS-Gruppenführer und Generalleutnant der Waffen-SS. Waffen-SS Gruppenführer also displayed the shoulder boards of a Wehrmacht Generalleutnant.

The insignia for SS-Gruppenführer consisted of three oak leaves centred on both collars of an SS uniform. From 1930 to 1942, the SS insignia was the same as the SA badge of rank; however the SS modified the Gruppenführer insignia slightly to include a collar pip (stern, a star), upon the creation of the rank SS-Oberst-Gruppenführer in April 1942.

In the SA, a Gruppenführer was typically in charge of a number of regiments (known as Standarten) which were formed into SA-Gruppen. The rank of Gruppenführer was also used in several other Nazi paramilitary groups, among them the National Socialist Motor Corps (NSKK) and the National Socialist Flyers Corps (NSFK). In October 1944, the rank of Gruppenführer was adopted by the Volkssturm as a low level non-commissioned officer position in charge of squad sized formations (Gruppe) of Volkssturm soldiers. The term is also a generic term for the function of a leader of a squad of infantry (9 or 10 men – Gruppe) in the German Army (Heer), Waffen-SS, or Luftwaffe ground troops.

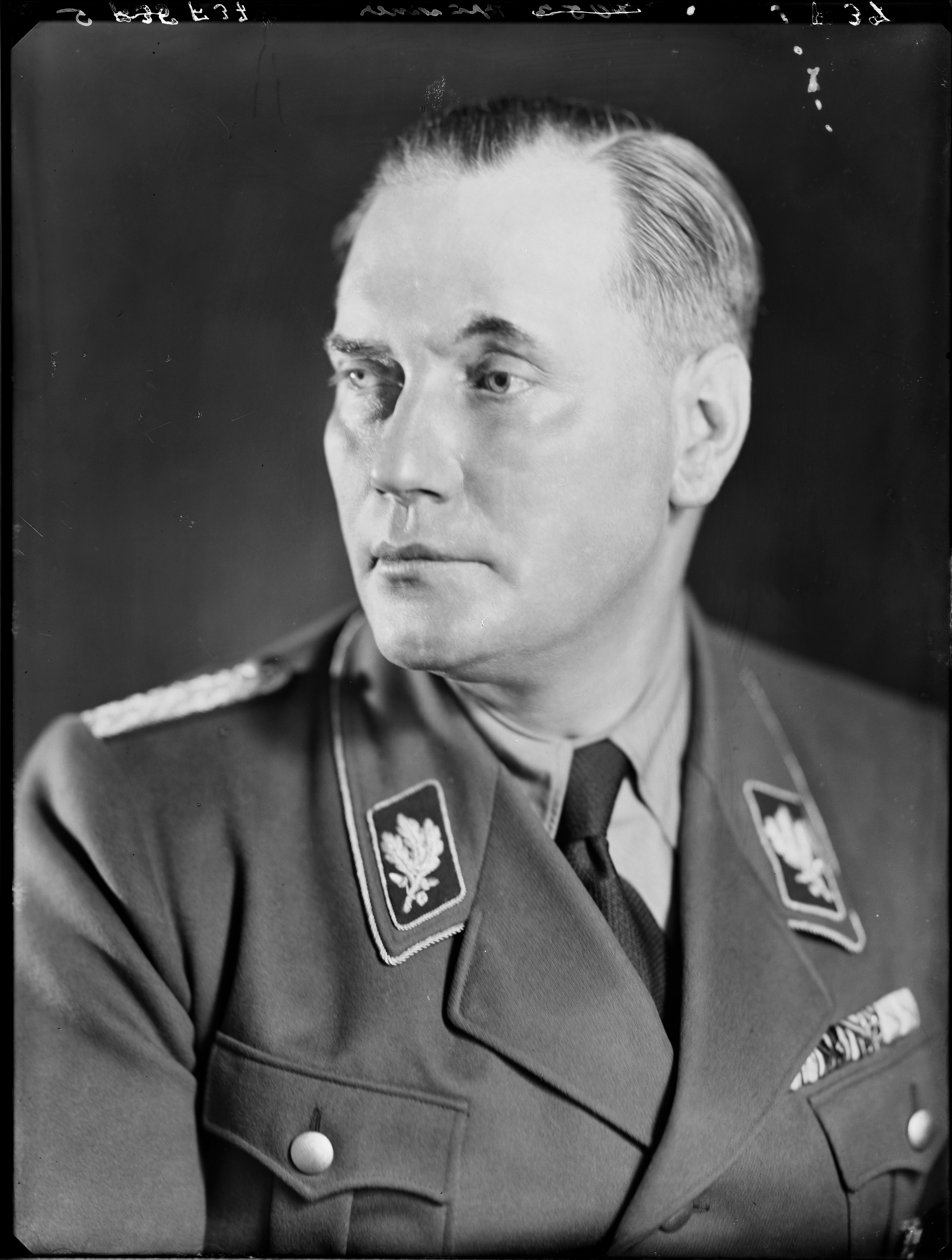
Hitler's Chief Adjutant Wilhelm Brückner as SA-Gruppenführer 1933–1934.
Photo: NARA

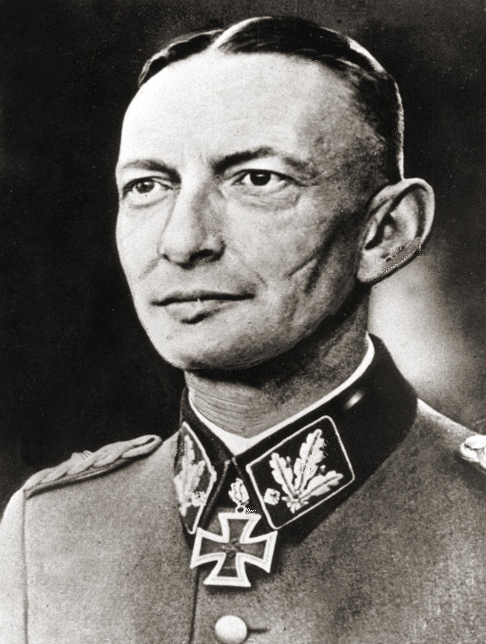
SS-Gruppenführer Heinz Reinefarth wearing the post-April 1942 SS rank insignia.

== Insignia ==
Gorget patch/collar tab
(Sturmabteilung)

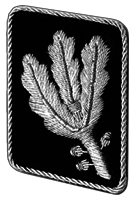
Gorget patch
until April 1942
(Allgemeine SS and Waffen-SS)

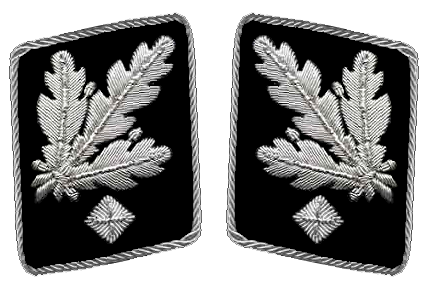
Gorget patches
1942–1945
(Allgemeine SS and Waffen-SS)

Shoulder board
(Waffen-SS)

NSFK Gorget patch

NSKK Gorget patch

Junior Rank; Brigadeführer	SS rank and SA rank Gruppenführer	Senior Rank; Obergruppenführer

== See also ==
- List of SS-Gruppenführer
- Comparative ranks of Nazi Germany
- Uniforms and insignia of the Sturmabteilung
- Uniforms and insignia of the Schutzstaffel
- Corps colours (Waffen-SS)
- Table of ranks and insignia of the Waffen-SS
