= Gorget patches =

Type of military insignia

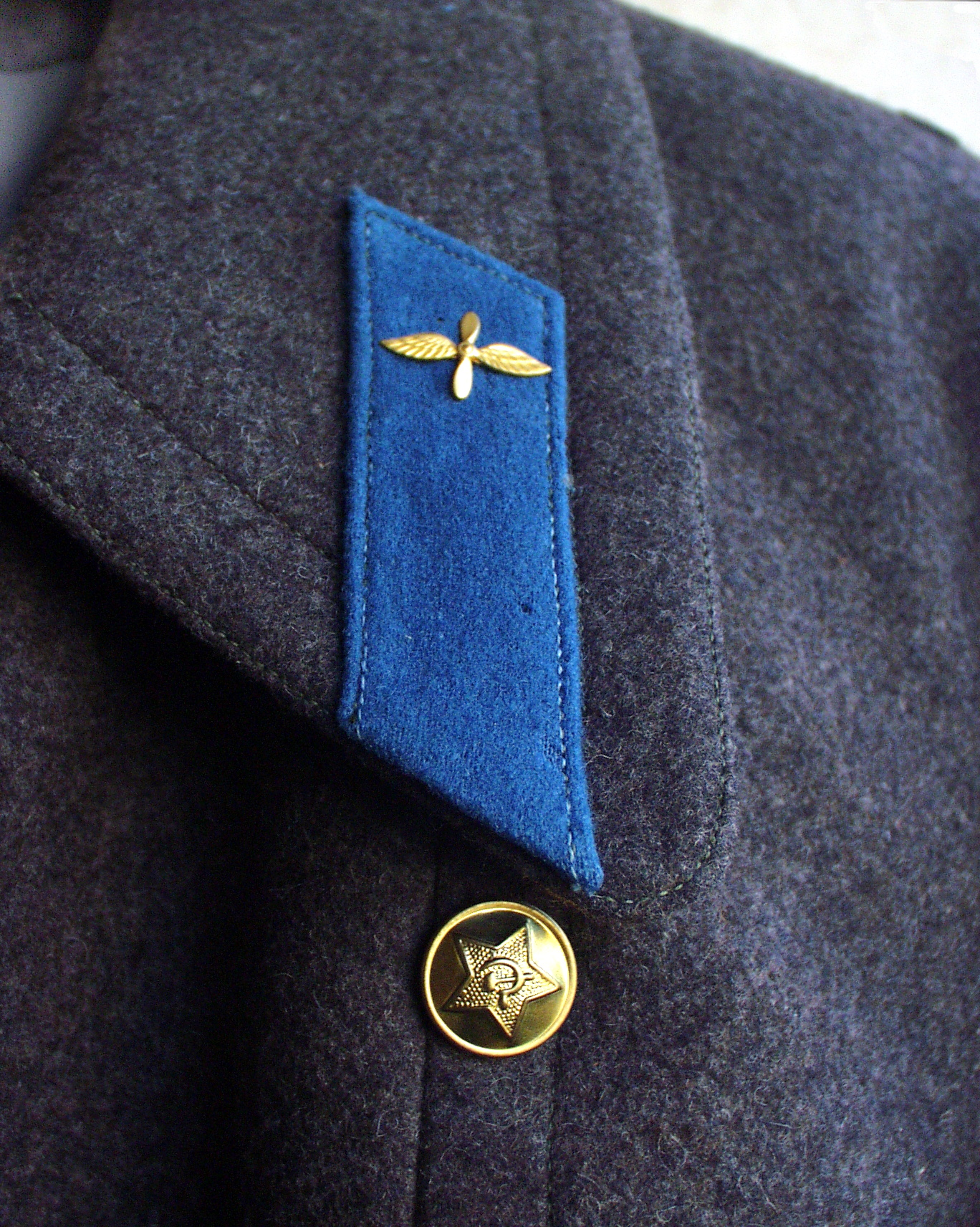
Collar patch of Soviet Air Forces, 1950s

Gorget patches (collar tabs, collar patches) are an insignia in the form of paired patches of cloth or metal on the collar of a uniform (gorget), used in the military and civil service in some countries. Collar tabs sign the military rank (group of ranks), the rank of civil service, the military unit, the office (department) or the branch of the armed forces and the arm of service.

== History ==
Gorget patches were originally gorgets, pieces of armour worn to protect the throat. When armour fell out of use, decorative cloth gorgets used the same name. The cloth patch on the collar however evolved from contrasting cloth used to reinforce the buttonholes at the collar of a uniform coat. (This is perhaps most evident in the traditional Commonwealth design for colonels, which has a button and a narrow line of darker piping where the slit buttonhole would have been.)

In the British Empire the patches were introduced as insignia during the South African War (1889-1902). They have been used ever since in many countries of the Commonwealth of Nations.

The collar patches of most of the armed forces of the Middle East and Arab derive from the uniform tradition of the European empires that dominated the region until World War II, especially Britain and France.

== Countries ==
=== Afghanistan ===
Afghan army has collar patches similar to Commonwealth ones. Under the Republic of Afghanistan, Afghan police officers working for the Ministry of Interior had a singular star on each collar patch.

=== Austria ===
In Austria collar patches of the Federal Army report the rank and the arm of service. They are also used in the police and fire service. Traditional, corps colours (German: Waffenfarben or Adjustierungsfarben) dominate the basic colours of the rank insignia.

In the Austro-Hungarian Army (k.u.k. Army), collar patches with rank insignia, appliquéd on the gorget of uniform coat, or jacket and the battle-dress blouse, were designated Paroli.

See also:

- Waffenfarbe (Austria)
- Rank insignia of the Austro-Hungarian armed forces

The galleries below show examples of Parolis

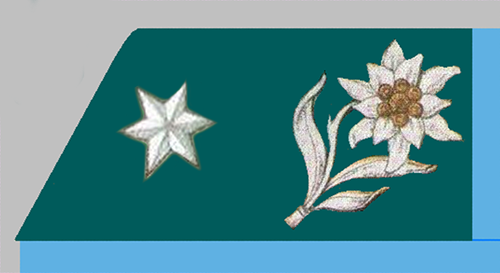
Patrouilleführer of the k.k. mountain infantry 1906-1918

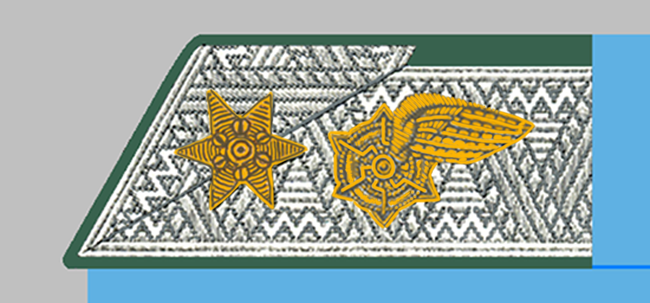
Major Paroli with special badge of the k.u.k. railway regiment

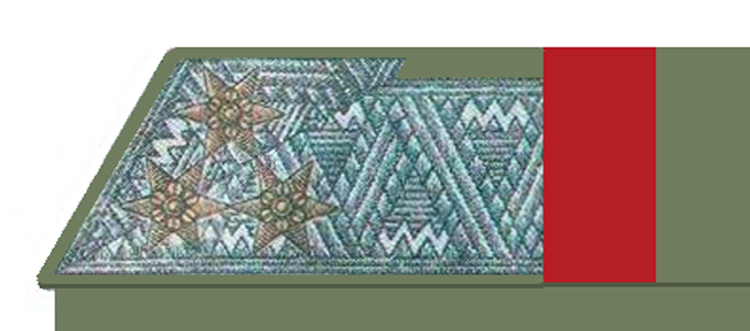
Oberst, Paroli with dark-red, vertical stripe 1916

=== Australia ===
In Australia traditional gorget patches are worn by army colonels and general officers as well as by navy midshipmen. In the St John Ambulance Australia First Aid Services Branch, gorget patches distinguish State Staff Officers and National Staff Officers from those who are officers of a division or region.

=== Bangladesh ===
In the Bangladesh Armed Forces officers of the rank of colonel equivalent and above wear gorget patches. They are respectively red, sky blue and black or golden yellow in color. For Colonel and above equivalent ranks "Shapla" insignia is displayed. Each higher flag rank level above colonel has an additional star added.

=== Belgium ===
In the Belgian army, the gorget patches have a branch color and rank insignia.

=== Brazil ===
In the Brazilian Army the gorget patches, embroidered oak leaves in silver, are worn on both lapels of rifle green and grey formal dress uniforms by generals. The same insignia, in gold, is worn on both collars of gala full-dress uniforms.

In the State of São Paulo Military Police, commanding officers of the rank of colonel wear, on both lapels of their dark-grey formal uniforms, embroidered silver insignia. This consists of an armillary sphere, surrounded with laurels and with a star on top.

=== Bulgaria ===
Gorget patches in the Bulgarian Army show which branch the wearer belongs to.

=== Canada ===
With the restoration of historical nomenclature and features to the Canadian Army in 2013 reinstated insignia included traditional gorget patches for colonels and general officers. For combat branches these are in scarlet with gold embroidery for generals. However, the gorget patches worn by senior officers of the Royal Canadian Medical Service are dull cherry, the Royal Canadian Dental Corps emerald green and the Royal Canadian Chaplain Service purple.

=== China ===
In People's Liberation Army of People's Republic of China gorget patches are used to denote a military rank.

=== Egypt ===
In Egypt red collar patches symbolize the highest ranks of officers.

=== Finland ===
Finnish Army and Air Force use collar patches in dress uniforms. They are used to display rank and corps colours. Not in use on field uniform.

=== France ===
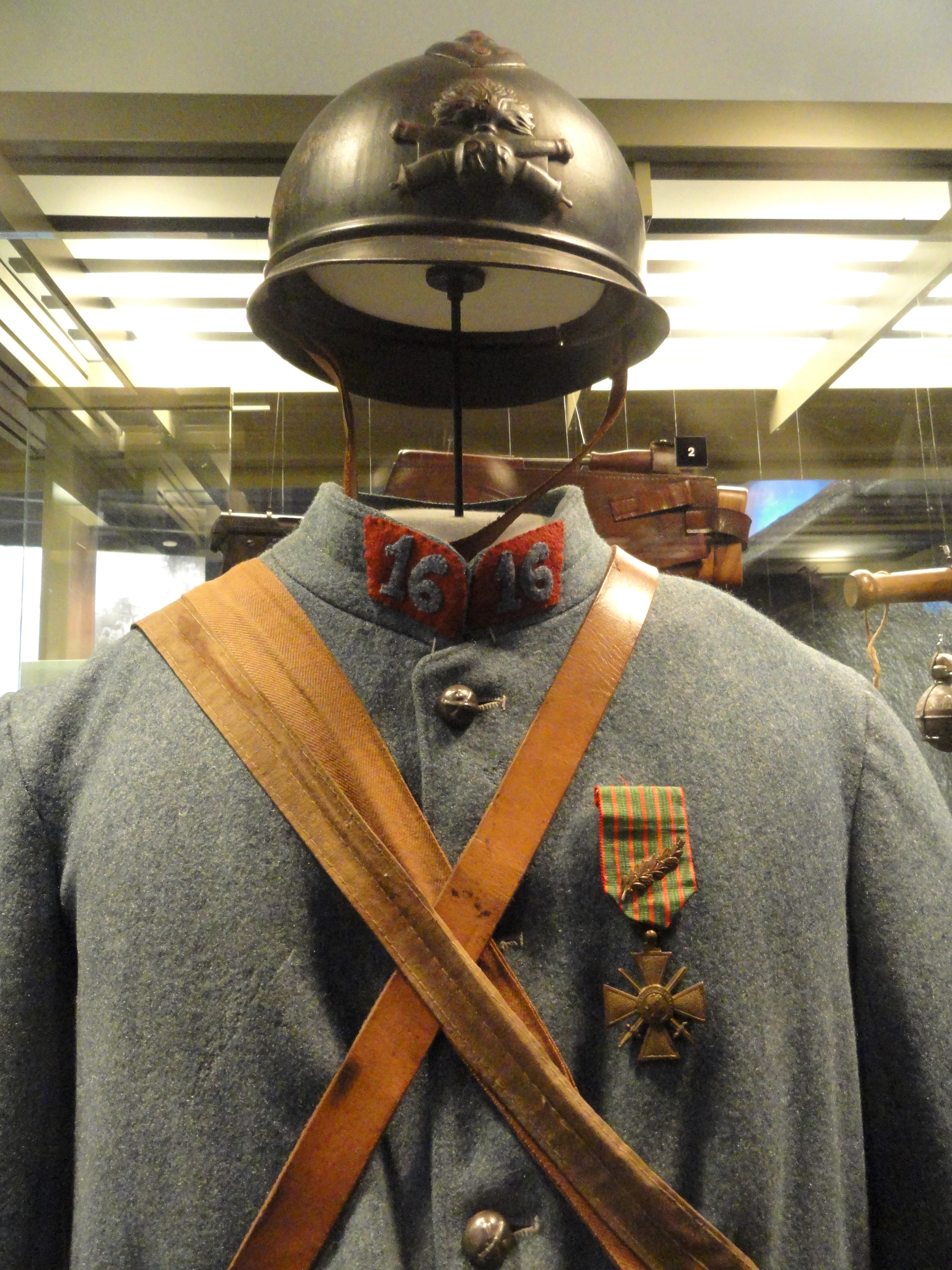
France artilleryman's uniform, 1916

In the French Army collar patches were used on tunics and greatcoats from the early nineteenth century onwards. Usually in contrasting collars to the collar itself, they came to carry a regimental number or specialist insignia. With the adoption of a new light-beige dress uniform for all ranks in the 1980s, the practice of wearing coloured collar patches was discontinued.

=== Germany ===
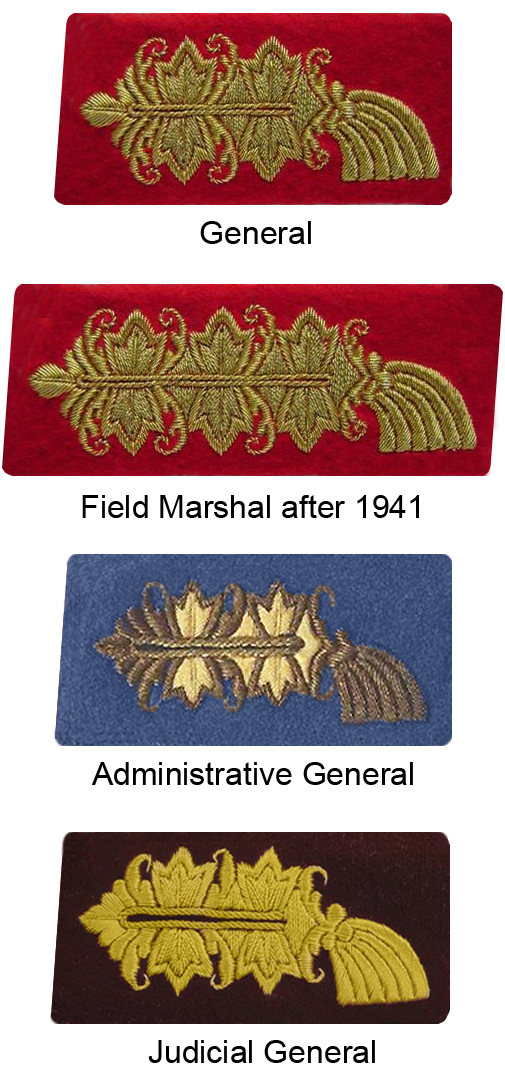
Arabesques of a German Wehrmacht Generals

Collar patches, or gorget patches (German: Kragenspiegel, also Kragenpatten or Arabesquen), are to be worn on the gorget (on both collar points) of military uniform in German speaking armed forces.

However, collar patch insignia for general officers of the Heer (Army) are traditionally called Arabesque collar patch, also Larish embroidery, Old Prussian embroidery, or Arabesquen embroidery (German: Arabesken-Kragenspiegel, also Larisch-Stickerei, Altpreußische Stickerei or Arabeskenstickerei).

In the German Empire, generals, some officers, guardsmen and seamen wore Kragenspiegel, but these were not part of the service-wide uniform.

In the Weimar Republic such patches (or Litzen) were introduced throughout the army in 1921, where they indicated the rank and the arm of service, but were not used in the navy.

The Wehrmacht continued this. Some Nazi-era civil services (e.g., police and railways) wore uniforms with collar tabs, similar to the armed forces' tabs. New tabs were also introduced for the political leaders of the NSDAP as well as new Nazi organisations like the Sturmabteilung (SA) or the Schutzstaffel (SS).

East Germany used similar collar tabs to those of the Wehrmacht for its army and air force. Collar tabs were also worn by some personnel of the navy.

The armed forces of the Federal Republic of Germany also maintained the use of collar tabs in the army and the air force, where they indicate to which branch (or Truppengattung) an individual soldier belongs. Members of the German Navy do not wear collar tabs.

=== Greece ===
In the Hellenic Army, the use of gorget/collar patches (επιρράμματα) was introduced for the undress and field uniforms, via Austrian and French influences, at the turn of the 20th century. They consist of a distinctive background colour or combination of colours, that denote a specific arm of service or corps; officers also feature a metal device with the arms/corps emblem, while other ranks and non-professional NCOs do not. General officers use a British-style general officer' patch.

Collar patches are also used by the Hellenic Police (and formerly by the Greek Gendarmerie and the Cities Police) and the Hellenic Fire Service.

=== Hong Kong ===
Senior officers, especially the commanding officer of each disciplinary unit in Hong Kong use gorget patches in their formal uniforms:

- Hong Kong Police
- Hong Kong Fire Services
- Hong Kong Correctional Services
- Customs and Excise
- Hong Kong Immigration
- Government Flying Service (Hong Kong)

The various services inherited their used as Hong Kong was a former British colony.

=== Indonesia ===
Gorget patches, officially, called "monograms", are worn by members of the Indonesian National Police. Most patches consist of cotton and rice embroidery (or sometimes metal made) on a dark brown background, with a red background for general officers and cadets of the National Police Academy.

Gorget patches have been worn by police since their separation from the Indonesian National Armed Forces in 1999.

=== India ===
In India, coloured gorget patches are used by senior-ranking Armed Forces officers of selection-grade rank (colonels, naval captains and group captains) and above: scarlet for Indian Army officers, gold in the Indian Navy and navy blue in the Indian Air Force. The Chief of Defence Staff wears maroon patches. Full colonels in the army wear golden braid on their patches to signify their commanding officer rank, while Navy captains and Air Force group captains wear twin silver oakleaves on theirs, set perpendicular to each other.

Flag officers of one-star through five-star rank wear a corresponding number of stars in gold (Indian Army) or silver (Indian Navy and Indian Air Force) on their collar patches. Flag officers of three-star rank and above who hold command positions wear an oak leaf wreath on each gorget patch, gold in the Army and silver in the Navy and Air Force. Only the Chief of Defence Staff and the three armed force chiefs hold four-star rank and only a field marshal or a marshal of the air force wears five stars. Till date, Sam Manekshaw and Kodandera Madappa Cariappa are the only two officers who have been appointed to the rank of Field Marshal, while Arjan Singh has been appointed to the rank of Marshal of the Indian Air Force. If the Indian Navy rank of Admiral of the Fleet is ever created, the holder would presumably wear five silver stars on a gold patch.

Commandants and deputy inspector-generals (below four years service) in the Indian Coast Guard, who rank with Indian Navy captains, wear a similar insignia of twin golden oakleaves set perpendicularly to each other and mounted on black-coloured patches. Coast Guard officers of one-star through three-star rank wear a corresponding number of gold stars on their patches. All senior ranking police officers of the Rank of Senior Superintendent of Police (SSP) or Senior Deputy Commissioner of Police (DCP) (both ranks being equivalent with Deputy Commissioner's are only in towns which has moved over to a commissioner system of policing this rank being equivalent to a full colonel in the Army) get a dark blue patch with a silver lining. This remains the same for the next higher rank of Deputy Inspector General (DIG) or Additional Commissioner of Police (Addl. CP). However, the next senior officer, The Inspector General (IG) or Joint Commissioner of Police (JCP) has a silver design of a long leaf rather than a simple silver lining on their patch. This remains the same for the ranks of Commissioner of Police and the Director General of Police (DGP).

=== Iran ===
In Iran black collar patches identify the highest ranks of officers.

=== Ireland ===
In the Irish Defence Forces, officers of Brigadier-general rank and above wear red and gold gorget patches.

=== Italy ===
Since the late nineteenth century the Italian Army has made extensive use of coloured collar patches to distinguish branches of service such as the artillery, infantry brigades and individual cavalry regiments. In 1902 each line infantry brigade (comprising two regiments) was distinguished by large collar patches of a distinctive colour or combination of colours. The universal silver "active service" star was attached at the front of each patch.

There are also distinctive collar patches for the San Marco Regiment (Navy), the Guardia di Finanza, the Carabinieri and the civilian police corps.

=== Jordan ===
In Jordan red collar patches symbolize the highest ranks of officers.

=== Nepal ===
Gorget patches are worn by senior officers of the Nepalese Army, Nepal Police and Armed Police Force Nepal. Gorget patches are called "Collar Docks" in the Nepal Police.

=== New Zealand ===
The New Zealand Defence Force has collar patches for senior officers on the Commonwealth model.

- New Zealand Governor General (if a civilian)-Jet Black with gold oak leaves
- All other Corps-Post Office Red
- Royal New Zealand Army Chaplains Department-Purple
- Royal New Zealand Army Medical Corps-Ruby
- Royal New Zealand Dental Corps-Emerald Green
- New Zealand Army Legal Services-Maroon
- New Zealand Army Pay Corps-Indian Yellow

=== North Korea ===
In North Korea gorget patches are used to denote a military rank.

=== Oman ===
In Oman black collar patches distinguish the most senior ranks of officers.

=== Pakistan ===
In Pakistan, collar patches are worn by senior officers and staff officers on the basis of their rank. A collar patch signifies that an officer is either a staff officer (Colonel) or a General Officer (Brigadier General or above).

When wearing non-combat standard uniform or service dress, Staff Officers (Colonel) in the Pakistan Army wear collar patches of crimson color with straight golden stripes and General officers wear collar patches of crimson color with golden braid.

When wearing combat uniform (CCD), the collar patches of junior officers (Lieutenant Colonel and below) carry the insignia of serving arms. Staff officers (Colonel) have no collar patch and General officers (Brigadier General and above) wear the corresponding number of stars that their rank carries on the collar.

=== Romania ===
Historically coloured gorget patches of a distinctive "arrow head" pattern were used in the Romanian army to distinguish regiments and branches. They survive to a limited extent in the collar braiding of modern ceremonial uniforms.

=== Russia ===
In the Russian Empire collar patches of red, blue, white and green distinguished each infantry regiment within a given division. Cavalry and other branches had a variety of collar patches.

In the USSR in 1924-1943 they served as the primary insignia of military ranks. The rank system changed several times, and collar patches were different in 1924–1935, 1935–1940 and 1940–1943 systems. When the shoulder insignia was restored in 1943, collar tabs remained as an insignia of the branch and the arm of service. Since 1932 they were also used as an insignia in some civil services.

The state of affairs is the same in the modern Russian Federation.

=== Somalia ===
In Somalia, only officers above the rank of Second Lieutenant (or Ensign) wear gorget patches, the Army wears red patches, the Navy wear black patches, the Air Force wear navy blue patches, the Police wear royal blue patches and the Custodial Corps wear green patches. Upon reaching the rank of Brigadier General or Commodore Admiral, the patches then will have a golden ornate pattern on them.

=== Sri Lanka ===
General officers and senior officers of the ranks of brigadier and colonel in the Sri Lanka Army wear gold-on-red gorget patches according to their rank; air force officers of similar rank wear white-on-blue gorget patches. Senior gazetted officers in the Sri Lanka Police ranks wear gorget patches of gold-on-black and silver-on-black. Officer cadets in the Army, Navy and the Air Force also wear patches. The Sri Lanka Army followed the British Army pattern for the gorget patches of its general officer and senior officers of the ranks of brigadier and colonel. In the late 2000s, the practice was changed by Field Marshal Sarath Fonseka, who adopted the Indian Army pattern, with gold/silver stars (number of stars denoting the rank) on scarlet background; worn on Dress No 2A, 4, 5, 5A, 6, 6A, 6B, 7 and 8. Officers of the rank of field marshal, general and the commander of the army would have an oak leaf chain of two oak leaves in gold colour. The traditional British pattern was retained for Dress No1, No 3 and 3A. For the officers of the Sri Lanka Army Medical Corps the background will be in maroon.

=== Sweden ===
In Swedish Army gorget patches on the combat uniform denote a branch of service and rank.

=== Switzerland ===
In the Swiss army collar patches denote the rank and the arm of service.

=== Syria ===
In Syria red collar patches symbolize the highest ranks of officers.

=== Ukraine ===
In the Soviet Ukraine colored collar patches (though without gorgets) were used, as in other parts of the USSR.

Historically Ukrainian national units during the period 1918-1920 and again 1941-45 wore collar patches resembling the gorget patches of other armies. These included the Ukrainian Sich Riflemen, the Ukrainian People's Army, the Sich Riflemen, and the Ukrainian Galician Army.

=== United Kingdom ===
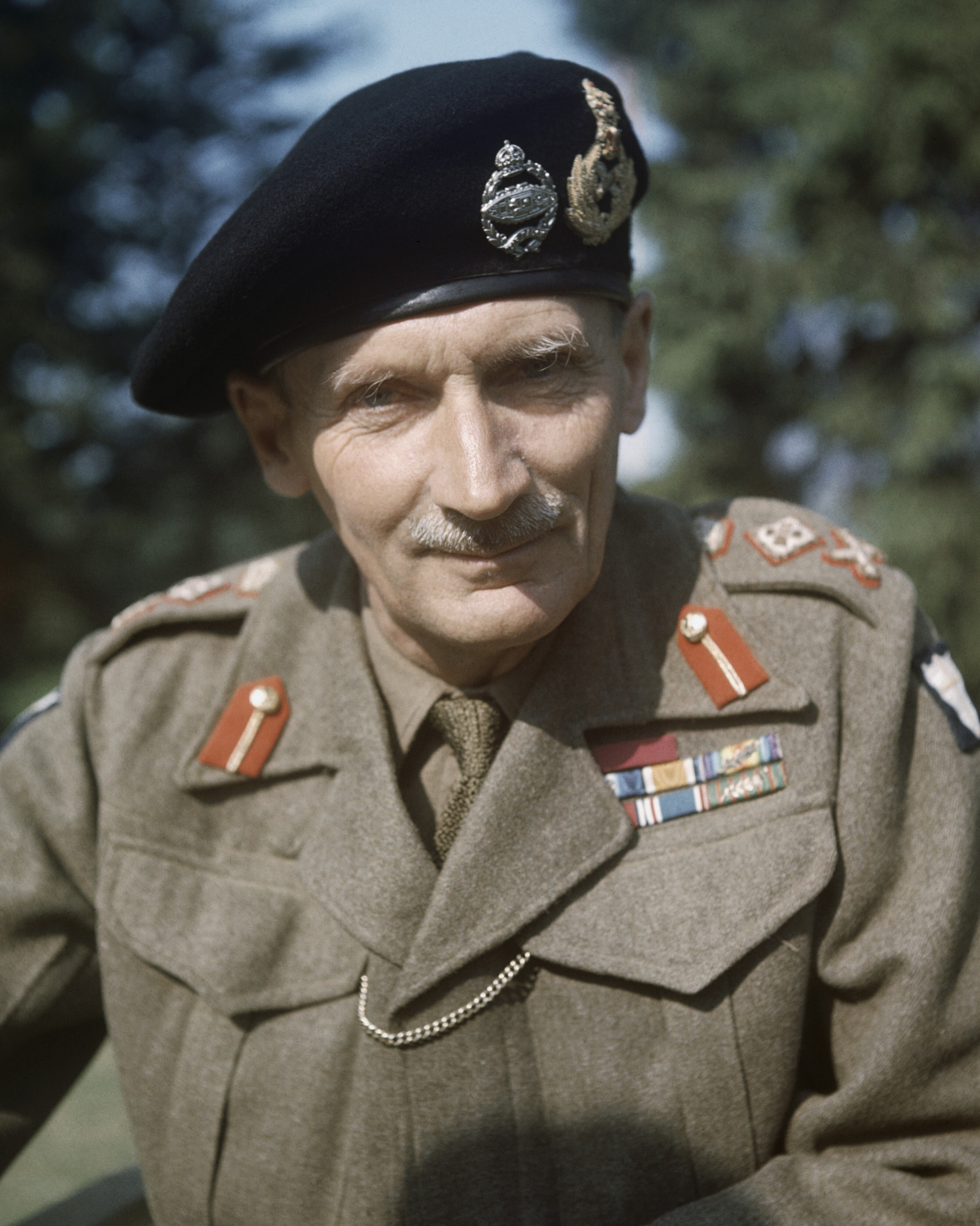
General Sir Bernard Montgomery wearing scarlet collar patches on his battledress tunic

General officers and senior staff officers of the British Army wear gorget patches according to their branch or arm of service; their counterpart police ranks wear similar gorget patches of silver-on-black (gold-on-black in the City of London Police). Officer cadets in the Merchant Navy, Army and the Royal Air Force also wear patches.

Introduced for British Army staff officers in India in 1887, the patches subsequently proliferated. Different colours were introduced to indicate the branch of service and by 1940 one finds:

- bright blue (engineers)
- dark blue (ordnance)
- pale blue (education)
- scarlet (general staff duties)
- cherry (medical)
- maroon (veterinary)
- purple (chaplains)
- green (dental)
- yellow (accountants)

During World War I all staff officers from second lieutenants upwards wore gorget patches and hatbands of these colours, making them conspicuous in the trenches and leading to the nickname of "the gilded staff". From 1921 coloured collar patches were restricted to full colonels on the staff and above.
