= Adolf Ritter von Denk =

Nazi paramilitary official (1886–?)

Stabsführer, National Socialist Motor Corps
- In office 1937–1945
- Preceded by: Office established
- Succeeded by: Office abolished

Personal details
- Born: Adolf Denk; 9 January 1886 Landshut, Kingdom of Bavaria, German Empire
- Died: Unknown
- Party: Nazi Party
- Occupation: Military officer
- Civilian awards: Blood Order

Military service
- Allegiance: German Empire
- Branch/service: Bavarian Army
- Years of service: 1908–1918
- Rank: Oberleutnant
- Unit: 2nd Royal Bavarian Heavy Cavalry "Archduke Francis Ferdinand of Austria"
- Battles/wars: World War I
- Military awards: Military Order of Max Joseph

Adolf Ritter von Denk (9 January 1886 – unknown) was a German career military officer who fought in World War I and later became a member of the Nazi Party and the chief of staff of its paramilitary National Socialist Motor Corps.

== Early life and military service ==
Born at Landshut in the Kingdom of Bavaria in 1886, Adolf Denk joined the Bavarian Army, was commissioned a Leutnant in March 1908 and was assigned to the 2nd Royal Bavarian Heavy Cavalry "Archduke Francis Ferdinand of Austria". Denk participated in World War I as an Oberleutnant on the western front. For his successful leadership of a ten-man cavalry reconnaissance patrol near Bauzemont and Parroy in northeastern France on 9 August 1914, he was decorated with the Military Order of Max Joseph, Bavaria's highest military order. This carried with it a knighthood that ennobled him as Adolf Ritter von Denk.

== Nazi Party paramilitary career ==
After the end of the war, Denk joined a Freikorps unit, and as a member of the Bund Oberland, took part in Adolf Hitler's failed Beer Hall Putsch of November 1923. He was awarded the Blood Order (No. 1362) of the Nazi Party in recognition of his participation. He joined the Nazi paramilitary National Socialist Motor Corps (NSKK), which at the time was part of the Sturmabteilung (SA). After the NSKK became an independent agency in September 1934, Denk became a member of its central leadership and, by 1937, rose to become the Stabsführer (staff leader) – effectively the deputy to Korpsführer Adolf Huhnlein. Hitler promoted Denk to NSKK-Gruppenführer on 30 January 1939. On 20 April 1941, Denk was raised to the rank of NSKK-Obergruppenführer. He retained his post as chief of staff under Hunlein's successor, Erwin Kraus. Little is documented regarding his subsequent life.
