= National Socialist Flyers Corps =

Nazi Party paramilitary organization

- Nationalsozialistisches Fliegerkorps - NSFK
- NSFK pennant

Agency overview
- Formed: 15 April 1937
- Preceding agency: German Air Sports Association
- Dissolved: 8 May 1945
- Jurisdiction: (Nazi Germany) Nazi Germany; Occupied Europe
- Agency executives: Friedrich Christiansen, Korpsführer; Gerhard Sporleder 1937-1941, Stabsführer; Karl Sauke 1941-1944, Stabsführer und Vertreter Korpsführer; Arno Kehrberg 1944-1945, Stabsführer

The National Socialist Flyers Corps (German: Nationalsozialistisches Fliegerkorps; NSFK) was a paramilitary aviation organization of the Nazi Party.

== History ==
NSFK was founded 15 April 1937 as a successor to the German Air Sports Association; the latter had been active during the years when a German air force was forbidden by the Treaty of Versailles. The NSFK organization was based closely on the para-military organization of the Sturmabteilung (SA). A similar group was the National Socialist Motor Corps (NSKK). During the early years of its existence, the NSFK conducted military aviation training in gliders and private airplanes.

== Leadership ==
Friedrich Christiansen, originally a Generalleutnant then later a General der Flieger in the Luftwaffe, was NSFK-Korpsführer from 15 April 1937 until 26 June 1943, followed by Generaloberst Alfred Keller until 8 May 1945. Hermann Göring as Reichsmarschall was nominal head of the NSFK and was occasionally consulted on issues surrounding heavy transport, as at the Battle of Stalingrad. The Stabsführer (staff leader) position was held by Gerhard Sporleder, Karl Sauke (who also carried the title of Deputy Korpsführer) and Arno Kehrberg.

== Ranks, uniforms and other insignia ==
The paramilitary rank system was in use by the NSFK between the years of 1933 and 1945. The ranks were designed after paramilitary rank titles of the Sturmabteilung. Most ranks of the NSFK were also used by the National Socialist Motor Corps which maintained its own paramilitary rank system.

As with most Nazi paramilitary groups, rank patches were worn on a single collar opposite a badge of unit membership. The exception was for the ranks Standartenführer and above which displayed rank insignia on both collars.

=== Rank insignia ===
As of 1937, the final rank pattern of the National Socialist Flyer Corps was as follows:

Insignia		NSFK Rank	Translation	Luftwaffe equivalent
Collar	Shoulder	NSFK Rank	Translation	Luftwaffe equivalent
		Korpsführer	Corps Leader	Generalfeldmarschall
		Ehrenführer	Honorary Leader	Generaloberst
		Obergruppenführer	Senior Group Leader	General
		Gruppenführer	Group Leader	Generalleutnant
		Brigadeführer	Brigade Leader	Generalmajor
		Oberführer	Senior Leader	Oberst
		Standartenführer	Regiment Leader	Oberst
		Obersturmbannführer	Senior Assault Unit Leader	Oberstleutnant
		Sturmbannführer	Assault Unit Leader	Major
		Hauptsturmführer	Chief Assault Leader	Hauptmann
		Obersturmführer	Senior Assault Leader	Oberleutnant
		Untersturmführer	Junior Assault Leader	Leutnant
		Obertruppführer	Senior Troop Leader	Stabsfeldwebel
		Truppführer	Troop Leader	Hauptfeldwebel
		Oberscharführer	Senior Squad Leader	Oberfeldwebel
		Scharführer	Squad Leader	Unteroffizier
		Rottenführer	Section Leader	Obergefreiter
		Sturmmann	Storm Trooper	Gefreiter
		Mann	Trooper	Flieger
None		Anwärter	Candidate	None

=== Uniforms ===
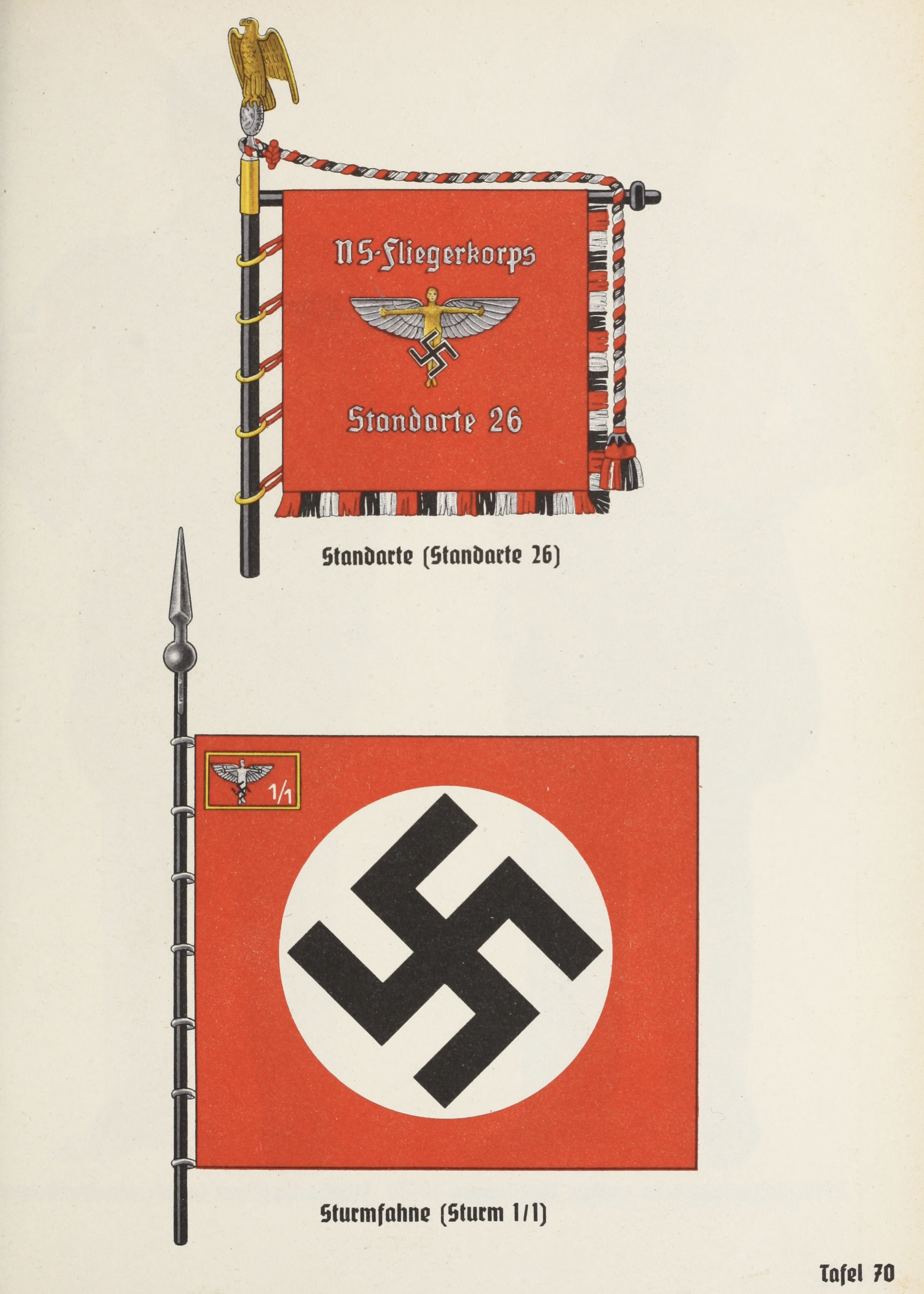

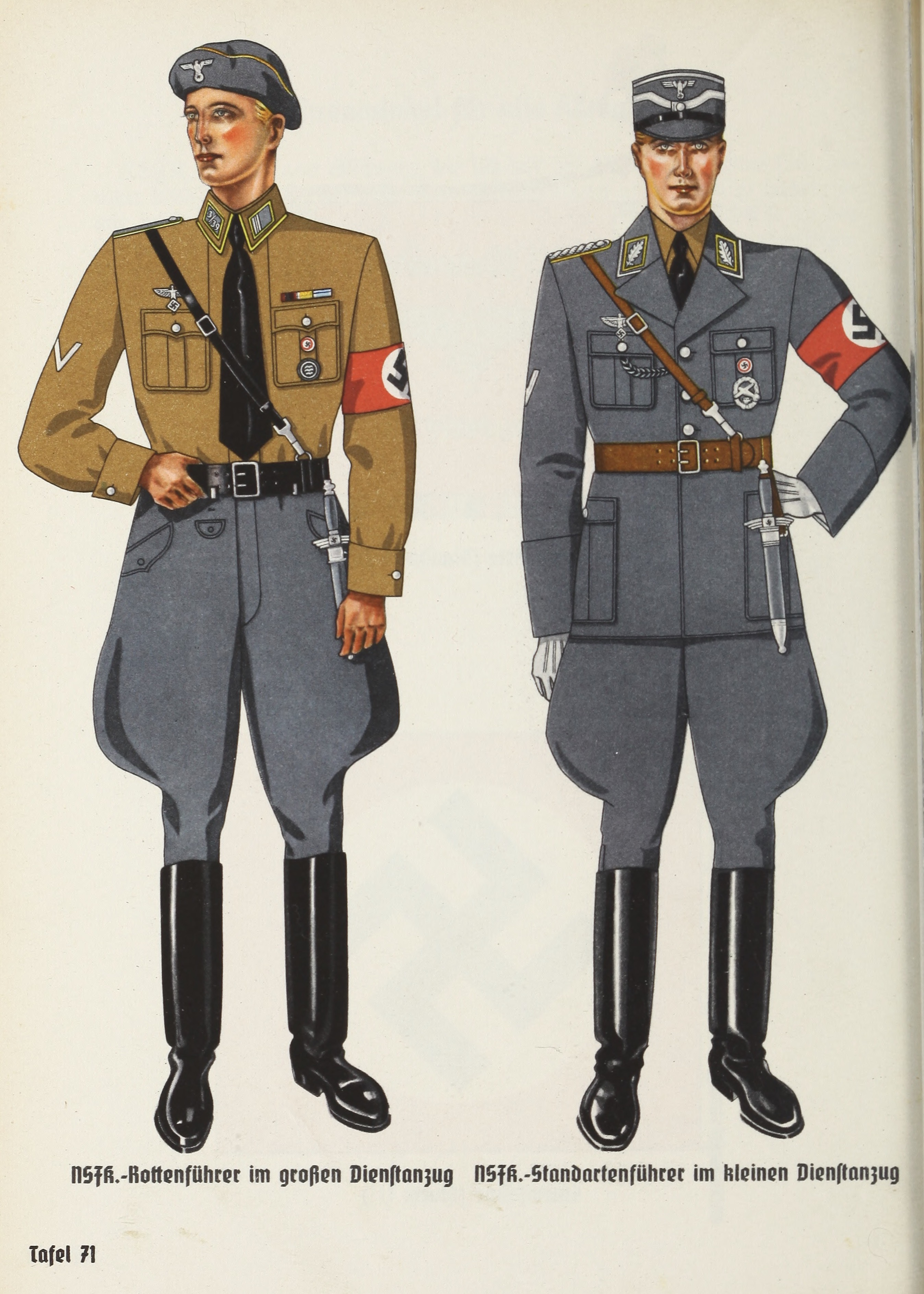

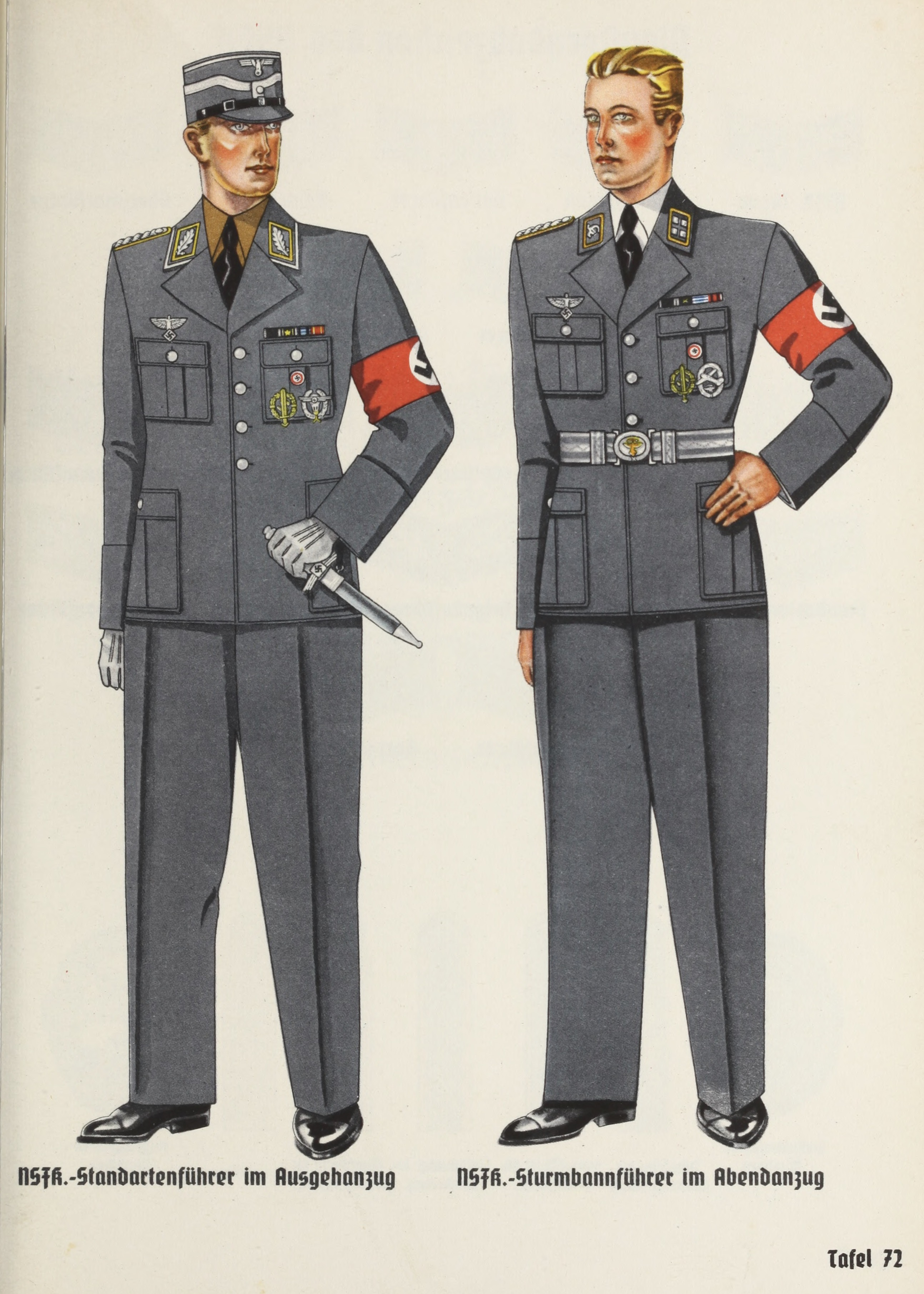

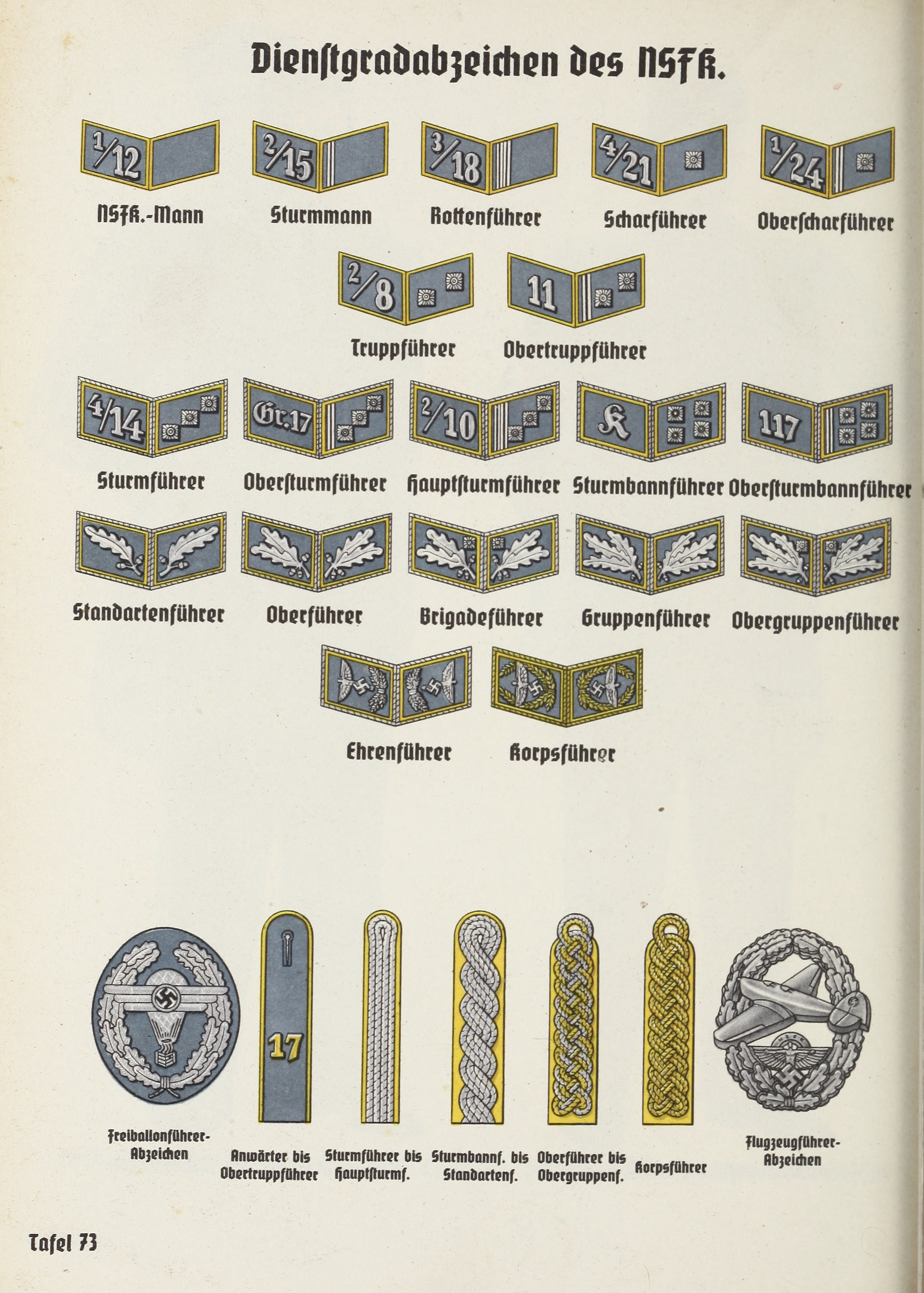

=== Rank flags ===
NSFK Korpsführer

NSFK Stabsführer

NSFK Gruppenführer

NSFK Standartenführer

NSFK Sturmangehörige

NSFK Sturmführer

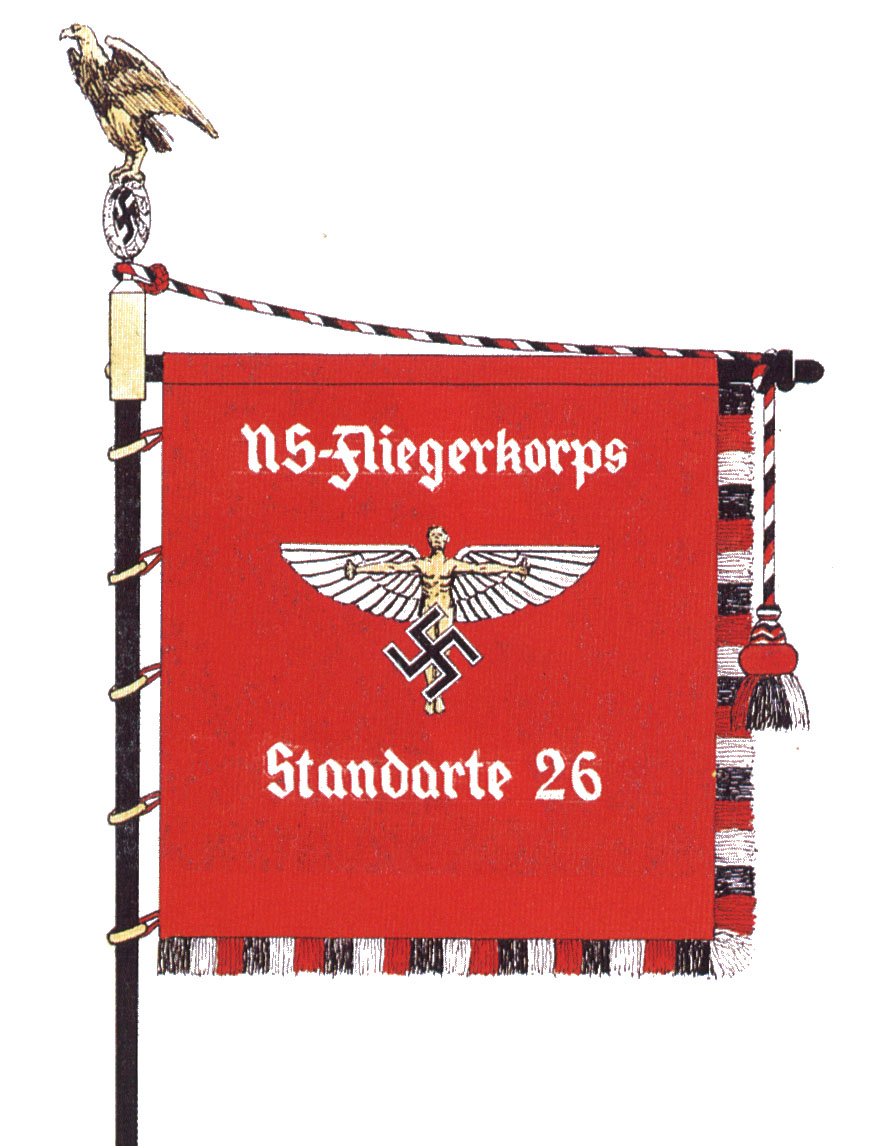
NSFK Standarte

NSFK Vehicle pennant

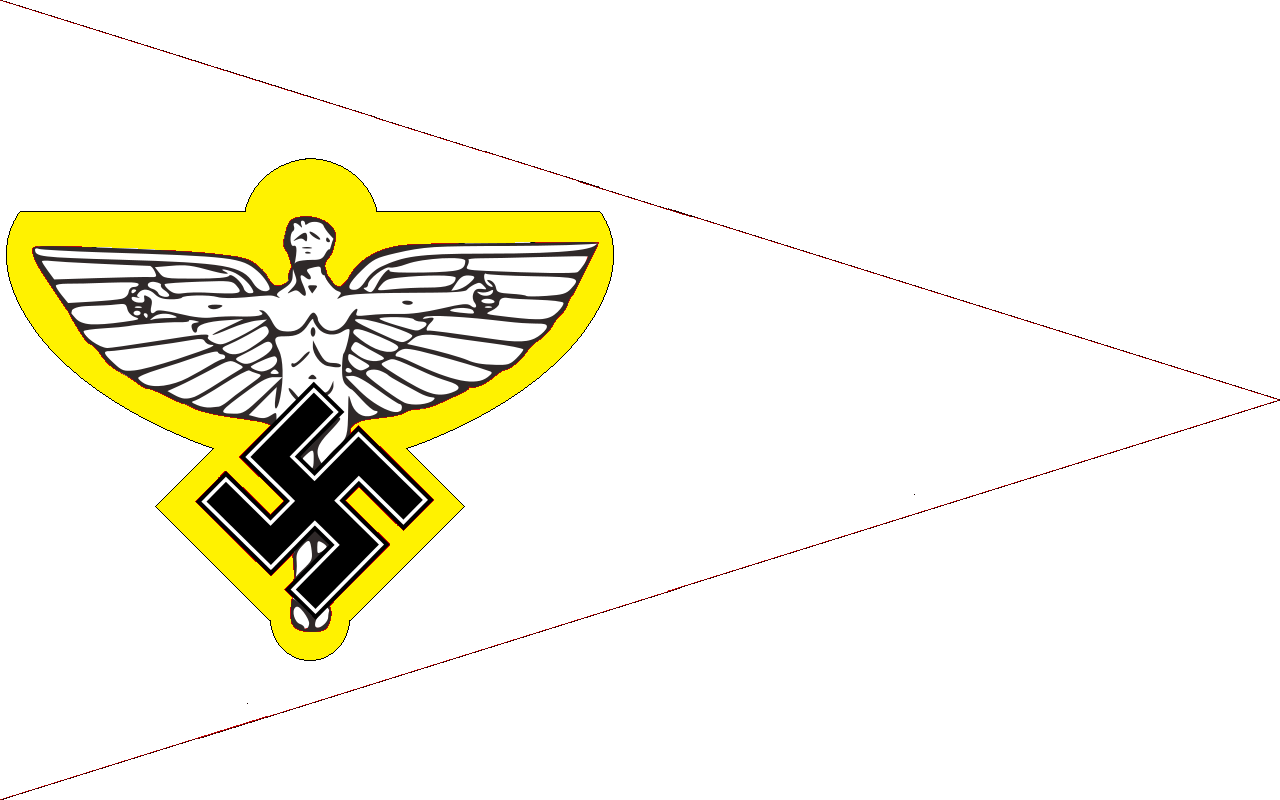
NSFK White vehicle pennant

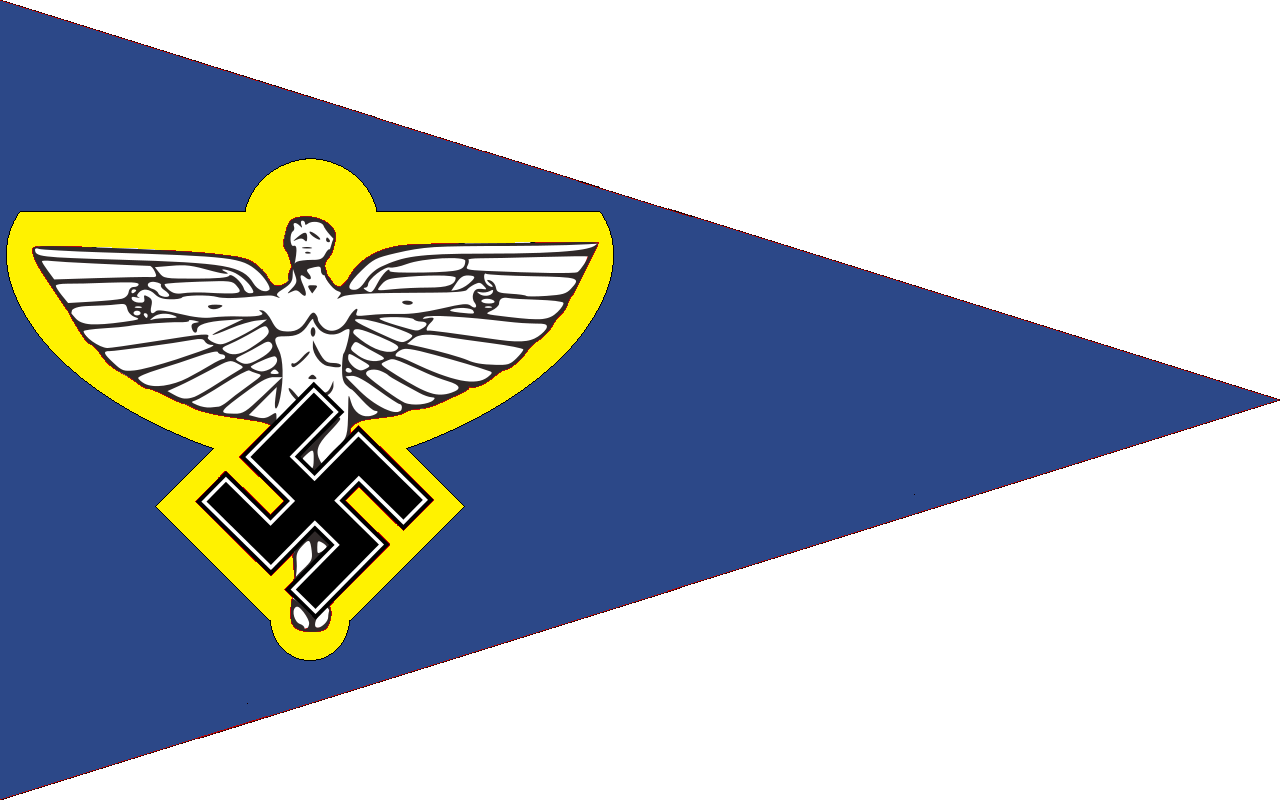
NSFK Blue vehicle pennant

== NSFK badges ==
- The Free Balloon Pilot Badge (Das Abzeichen für Freiballonführer). This was authorized on 10 March 1938 by NSFK Korpsführer, Christiansen.
- The Motor Aircraft Pilot Badge (Das Abzeichen für Motorflugzeugführer). This was authorized on 12 July 1938 by Christiansen.
- The Large Glider Flyer Badge (Das Große Segelfliegerabzeichen). This was authorized on 26 January 1942 by Christiansen.
