= Legion Speer =

Agency overview
- Formed: 1942
- Dissolved: 1944
- Type: Paramilitary
- Jurisdiction: German-occupied Europe
- Headquarters: Berlin
- Employees: 7,700
- Minister responsible: Albert Speer
- Agency executive: NSKK-Gruppenführer Martin Jost, Kommandeur der Legion Speer

Legion Speer was a Nazi German paramilitary motor transportation corps founded in 1942. The members of the Legion were non-German citizens, and as such could not belong to the Nationalsozialistisches Kraftfahrkorps (NSKK). The legion was disbanded in 1944, and its members absorbed into the Transportkorps Speer. It was named after Albert Speer.

== Creation ==
Legion Speer was founded in 1942, as a corps of drivers and mechanics recruited in occupied Europe. Motor transportation for Organisation Todt (OT) was organized by the NSKK, but non-Germans could not become members, as it was a sub-organization of the Nazi Party. Hence a special corps had to be created.

== Personnel ==
The first members of the Legion were White Russian emigrants. The majority of its members were Soviet POWs serving as Hiwis. They were only allowed to serve in Western Europe. The Legion was open to all citizens of occupied Europe; Belgians, Czech, Norwegians, and others. Command positions were reserved for Germans. Some Germans also served as drivers. The Legionaries took a personal oath of allegiance to Adolf Hitler. A number of Norwegians were members of the Legion; some of them were drafted, but most of them had volunteered.

== Organization ==
The Legion was a motor transportation corps, operating within the framework of the NSKK, in the service of the OT, the Ministry of Armament, the army, and the Luftwaffe. The Legion had Ersatzabteilungen (depots) in Paris, Oslo, Belgrade and Kiev. From 1943 the organization of the Legion corresponded with the organization of the OT:

- Legion Speer Italien, Rome
- Legion Speer Norwegen, Oslo
- Legion Speer Reich, Berlin
- Legion Speer Südost, Belgrade
- Legion Speer West, Paris

== Disbandment ==
The Legion was disbanded on September 12, 1944, and its members transferred to Transportkorps Speer.

== Ranks ==
Insignia	Ranks	Comparative ranks in the Wehrmacht
	Generalkapitän	Generalmajor
	Chefkapitän	Oberst
	Stabskapitän	Oberstleutnant
	Kapitän	Major
	Hauptzugführer	Hauptmann
	Oberzugführer	Oberleutnant
	Zugführer	Leutnant
	Stabsfahrmeister	Stabsfeldwebel
	Hauptfahrmeister	Oberfeldwebel
	Oberfahrmeister	Feldwebel
	Fahrmeister	Unterfeldwebel
	Unterfahrmeister	Unteroffizier
	Hauptkraftfahrer	Obergefreiter
	Oberkraftfaher	Gefreiter
	Kraftfahrer	Grenadier

== See also ==
- Transportflotte Speer
