= Gauführer =

Nazi paramilitary rank, 1925 to 1929

- Country: Weimar Republic
- Service branch: Sturmabteilung; Schutzstaffel
- Abbreviation: Gauf
- Formation: 1925–1926
- Abolished: 1928–1929
- Next higher rank: Brigadeführer
- Next lower rank: Standartenführer
- Equivalent ranks: Oberführer

Gauführer was an early rank used between 1925 and 1929 by paramilitary organizations of the Nazi Party, primarily the Sturmabteilung (SA) and the Schutzstaffel (SS). Translated as "region leader", the title of Gauführer was influenced by the similarly named Nazi Party political position of Gauleiter. The insignia for a Gauführer was a swastika armband with two white stripes. The Gauführer was eventually phased out by subsequent reorganizations of the SA and SS that resulted in new components headed by an Oberführer.

== Sturmabteilung (SA) ==
The SA-Gauführer rank originated sometime after the reestablishment of the Nazi Party and the SA in early 1925. This followed a period during which these organizations had been outlawed after Adolf Hitler's failed Beer Hall putsch of November 1923. The newly-created SA-Gauführer commanded a Gausturm composed of several SA-Standarten, each headed by an SA-Standartenführer. The Gaustürme were the largest SA organizational units until 1928. There originally were 19 Gaustürme established by Franz Pfeffer von Salomon, who Hitler named Supreme SA Leader in November 1926. Pfeffer deliberately drew the jurisdictional boundaries of the Gaustürme so as not to coincide with the Party districts, Reichstag electoral districts, military districts or German federal states. He did this to enhance the SA's independence by separating it as much as possible from the Party political organization.

The Gaustürme and the Gauführer rank were phased out in March 1928 when Pfeffer reorganized the SA into seven even larger geographic commands, each headed by an SA-Oberführer. These were named Mitte, Nord, Ost, Ruhr, Süd, West and Ostmark (Austria).

== Schutzstaffel (SS) ==
The SS-Gauführer rank was established to command the six regional SS-Gaue commands: SS-Gau Berlin Brandenburg, SS-Gau Franken, SS-Gau Niederbayern, SS-Gau Oberbayern, SS-Gau Rheinland-Süd, and SS-Gau Sachsen. Each SS-Gauführer commanded several SS-Staffeln, each of which was headed by an SS-Staffelführer.

The rank of SS-Gauführer ceased to exist after January 1929 when Heinrich Himmler, the newly-appointed Reichsführer-SS, consolidated the SS-Gaue into three new larger SS units known as SS-Oberführerbereiche (senior leadership areas), each commanded by an SS-Oberführer. These were named Ost (Berlin-Brandenburg, East Prussia and Silesia), Süd (Baden-Württemberg, Franken, Niederbayern, Oberbayern and Österreich) and West (Hesse-Nassau, Rheinland-Nord, Rheinland-Süd, Südhannover-Braunschweig and Thüringin).

== Sources ==
- Campbell, Bruce (1998). The SA Generals and the Rise of Nazism. Lexington: University Press of Kentucky. ISBN 978-0-813-12047-8.
- Lepage, Jean-Denis (2016). Hitler's Stormtroopers: The SA, The Nazi's Brownshirts, 1922–1945. Frontline Books. ISBN 978-1-399-07721-7.
- McNab, Chris (2009). The SS: 1923–1945. London: Amber Books. ISBN 978-1-906-62649-5.
- Miller, Michael D.; Schulz, Andreas (2017). Gauleiter: The Regional Leaders of the Nazi Party and Their Deputies, 1925–1945. Vol. 2 (Georg Joel – Dr. Bernhard Rust). R. James Bender Publishing. ISBN 978-1-932-97032-6.
