= Evacuations of children in Germany during World War II =

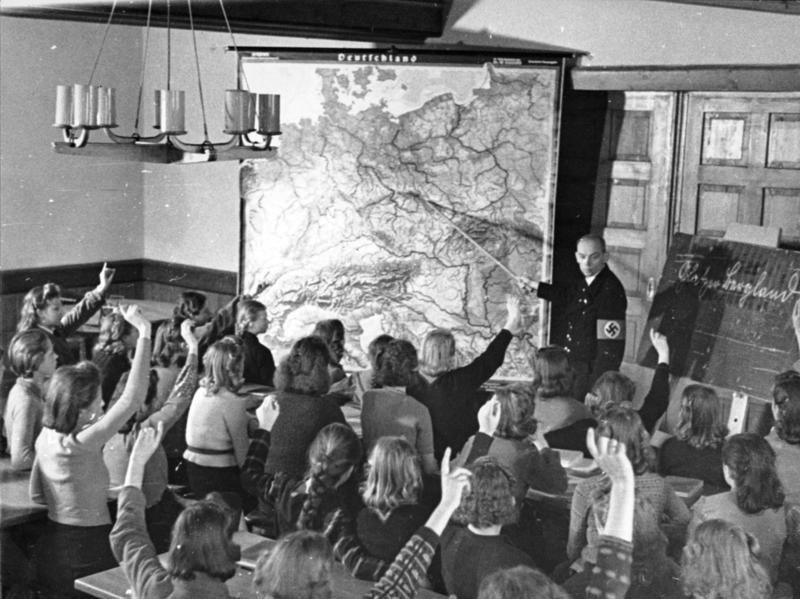
KLV children from Berlin in Glatz during a geography lesson, October 1940

The evacuation of children in Germany during the World War II was designed to save children in Nazi Germany from the risks associated with the aerial bombing of cities, by moving them to areas thought to be less at risk. The German term used for this was Kinderlandverschickung (German pronunciation: [kɪndɐˈlantfɛɐ̯ˌʃɪkʊŋ]; abbreviated KLV), a short form of Verschickung der Kinder auf das Land (lit. 'relocation of children to the countryside'). (Note: Verschickung is to be translated as "sending away".)

== Background ==
The term Kinderlandverschickung (KLV) was used from the late 19th century for Erholungsverschickung ("recreational deportation") of sick and underprivileged children to foster care in the country. From 1916, the Reichszentrale Landaufenthalt für Stadtkinder (Reich Central Office Country Residence for City Children) coordinated country holidays for city children, usually of around ten to fourteen years of age for a duration of up to three weeks. Around 488,000 children were sent in 1923 and 650,000 in 1934. From May 1933 the responsibility for the scheme was transferred to National Socialist People's Welfare (NSV).

== Evacuation from air raids ==
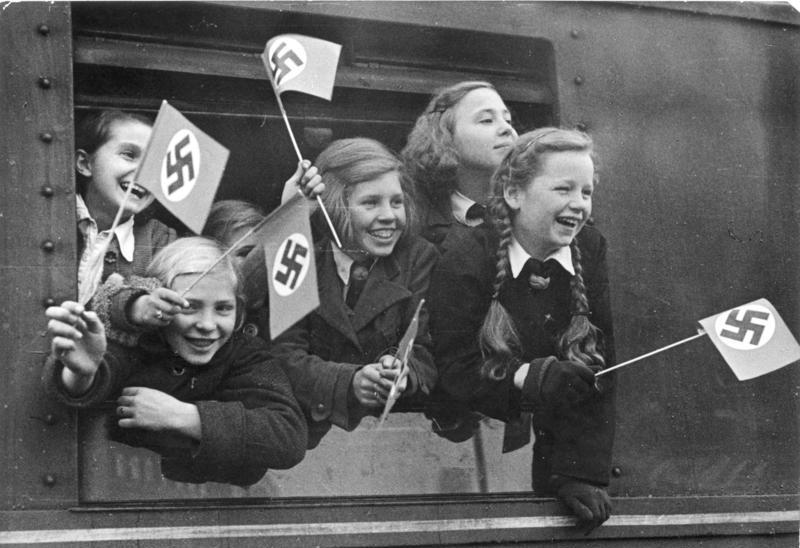
KLV children taking "special leave" from Berlin.

At the outbreak of World War II, there were no large scale evacuation of civilians in Germany as there was in Britain. From early 1940, KLV was extended to children under the age of 10 but participation was voluntary. Adolf Hitler personally intervened following the Royal Air Force bombing of Berlin on 24 September 1940, instructing the evacuation of children from areas at risk of bombing. On 27 September of that year, Martin Bormann wrote in a confidential memo:

On the orders of the Führer, children from areas of repeated night air raids have, in Hamburg and Berlin in particular, on a free decision of a guardian been sent to other areas of the Reich ... The NSV takes over the deportation of more school-age children and the children of the first four school years, the HJ will cover accommodation. Accommodation action starts on Thursday, 3 October 1940.

The NSV organised the relocation of mothers with children up to 3 years of age (later raised to 6 years), with or without older siblings, and some pregnant women to host families in safer areas . An estimated 202,000 mothers with 347,000 children were relocated by special trains up to the middle of 1942.

The NSV also organised the relocation of younger children aged 3 to 10 to host families and the transport arrangements for children of all ages to stay with relatives in safer areas. The relocation of children aged between 10 and 14 was the responsibility of the Hitler Youth. The Reichsdienststelle KLV (Reich KLV Office) provided overall coordination.

The term Evakuierung ("evacuation") was avoided and the terms Unterbringungsaktion ("housing action") and Erweiterter ("Extended") KLV were used instead. However the SS reported the public was using terms such as "evacuation of endangered cities" and "disguised forced evacuation".

KLV was extended to Essen, Cologne and Düsseldorf and areas of Schleswig-Holstein, Lower Saxony and Westphalia. By the start of 1941, 382,616 children and young people, including 180,000 from Berlin and Hamburg, had been sent to safer areas of Bavaria, Saxony and Prussia by 1,631 special trains and 58 boats. Around half were sent to host families and half to 2,000 KLV camps. Relocations peaked in July 1941 with 171,079 relocated that month. By April 1942, around 850,000 had been evacuated.

From 1941, the list of safer areas was expanded to include parts of Austria, Pomerania, Silesia, Sudetenland and Reichsgau Wartheland. Some children of "proper attitude and performance" were sent to Hungary, Czechoslovakia and Denmark to "take the German reputation abroad".

The German leadership was expecting a swift victory and initially children were not expected to be away for more than a few weeks. Children started returning to their parents after six months. In mid-1941, parents were advised that children would be away for six to nine months and earlier repatriation was prohibited. This was extended unless parents expressly objected.

The total number of evacuations is unknown as Reichsdienststelle KLV documents were destroyed at the end of the war but Otto Würschinger, a senior official in the Hitler Youth, wrote that by 1943 the total operation comprised about 3 million children and young people, including 1 million in KLV camps. Postwar estimates frequently cite the figure of 2.8 million evacuations in total, although one estimate puts the figure as high as 5 million.

== Organization ==
Ultimate responsibility was with the Reichsdienststelle KLV, under the direction of the Reichsjugendführer. Baldur von Schirach appointed Stabsführer Helmut Möckel, his deputy and a member of the Reichstag, to oversee the day-to-day operation. As was the case with the polycratic organizational structure of National Socialist institutions, there was considerable overlap of responsibility with the NSV, the Reich Ministry of Science, Education and Popular Culture, and the National Socialist Teachers League.

== Selection of participants ==
Initially, children of "German blood" were accepted provided they were not suffering from infectious diseases. Children suffering from epilepsy and chronic enuresis were subsequently rejected, as were "maladjusted antisocial youths". Children covered by the Nuremberg Laws were excluded. Mischling of the second degree (children with one Jewish grandparent) were initially excluded, but this was relaxed in November 1943.

== Accommodation ==
=== Host families ===
Most mothers with young children were housed with host families. The host family received some additional public holidays as well as increased food rations. Financial compensation was provided from 1943.

Children aged 6 to 10 were generally housed with foster families. The initial relocation was planned for six months but was usually extended several times. The host family was provided with an additional ration card and an allowance of 2 Reichsmarks per day. Children with foster families attended local schools.

Children also were sent to ethnic German or pro-German host families in Denmark, Latvia, Croatia, Hungary, Bulgaria, Slovakia and Poland.

=== Relatives ===
A large number of children were sent to stay with relatives in safer areas. These arrangements were made privately but the NSV arranged for transport by special trains. Staying with relatives became more popular later in the war, particularly with those who rejected the ideology of KLV camps or who rejected state evacuation on principle.

=== KLV camps ===
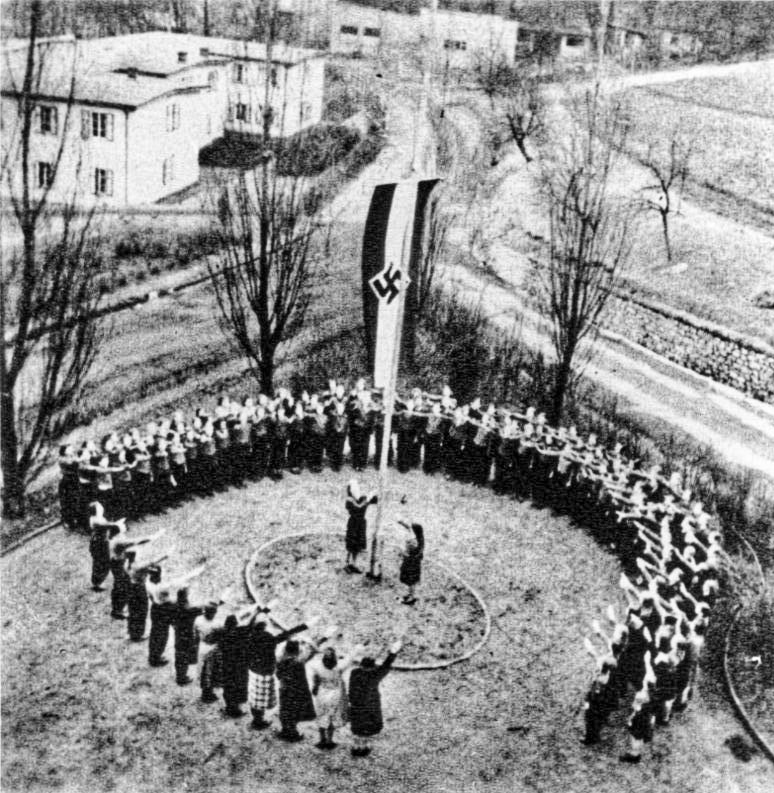
Flag raising at a KLV camp

About 9,000 KLV camps were established throughout safer areas of the Reich, including Austria, Sudetenland, Reichsgau Wartheland and Bohemia-Moravia. The size varied from as few as 18 children to as many as 1,200 children. Camps were established in hotels, hostels, monasteries, remote schools and in some cases converted warehouses. Children were grouped by gender and age with each group placed under the supervision of a teacher. The camp director was also a teacher. For leisure activities, children were divided into groups of up to 45 under the direction of a Hitler Youth team leader.

The daily routine was strictly regulated by the Reichsdienststelle KLV which published a 61-page manual of instructions. It was based the same regime of order, discipline and obedience as military training and used military jargon and children were required to wear KLV uniforms. Children were woken at 06:30 after which they would wash, clean their dormitories and report any health problems. Breakfast was after a flag-raising ceremony at 07:30. Academic education was provided from 08:00 to 12:00. There was a one-hour rest period after lunch, followed by Hitler Youth activities, learning practical outdoor skills, outdoor games, sports and evening entertainment such as music and newsreels. Children were normally in bed at 21:00. Sunday worship was permitted, but the camps were officially non-religious and were instructed in February 1941 to watch out for "religious counter-propaganda". Some former KLV children report slightly different daily routines. Older boys also received pre-military training such as marching and shooting.

In October 1940, Gottlob Berger convinced Hitler that one KLV camp in every HJ Region should be for the exclusive use of the SS. By 1942 the SS was running 42 of the camps. This required around 500 SS staff, including 135 non-commissioned officers with combat experience assigned as trainers. About 90,000 youths went through the camps, but due to the recruitment quota system most were compelled to join the Army when they reached the required age. However at one camp near Linz around half the boys joined the SS. During 1942 the number of SS-run camps was significantly reduced due to the requirement of the SS for combat-ready personnel. However, in late 1942, Stabsführer Möckel and Berger convinced Hitler and Heinrich Himmler that special camps should be used specifically for pre-military training. By the middle of 1943, three KLV camps in Germany and four in occupied countries were specifically operated to train Germanic youths willing to join the Waffen-SS.

In August 1944, Möckel suggested that 100,000 boys in the KLV camps should be trained in "self-defense squads" to fight guerrillas around the camps. Boys from the some KLV camps were formed into HJ irregular units and issued with small arms to guard field workers against partisans. The idea never came to fruition and KLV boys aged 15 to 17 were among the 300,000 members of the HJ reserved as the third wave of the Volkssturm. However 400 boys were trained to be part of Operation Werwolf.

Jost Hermand, later a professor of modern German literature and German cultural history, wrote of torturous paramilitary exercises, constant drill, a permanent intrusive indoctrination and brutalization of weaklings. Alois Pappert described it as "a political rape, a kind of brainwashing". However some children who lived in KLV camps reported little political indoctrination and recalled the time as cheerful and carefree, although overshadowed by homesickness.

== Resistance to evacuation ==
Despite KLV relocating children to relative safety, by 1943 KLV was becoming increasingly unpopular with parents who (correctly) expected years of separation and felt children would become alienated. After the devastating air raids on Hamburg in October 1943, the SD found that of the 70,000 school age children present, only 1,400 had agreed to KLV.

There was also religious opposition to KLV, notably from Clemens August Graf von Galen, Bishop of Münster, who wrote in a pastoral letter that the children remained in the camps without any ecclesiastical and religious care.

== Repatriation ==
Repatriation towards the end of the war was often hasty and arranged at short notice in the face of advancing Allied armies, or in some cases repatriation was prevented by fighting. In many cases trains were provided, but in some cases children were ordered to march to other camps. Some camps were closed and the children hidden by local farmers, and in a few cases children escaped and made their own way home. Around 4,000 children were repatriated by the Allied armies in the second half of 1945 with the remainder in the spring of 1946.

== Effectiveness ==
Many historians regard KLV to be largely positive, saving many children from air raids and providing them with relative safety, good food and education in difficult times, resulting in them being less burdened by traumatic experiences than those who remained in cities during heavy bombing.

== See also ==
- Evacuations of civilians in Britain during World War II
- Evacuations of civilians in Japan during World War II

== Bibliography ==
- Volker Böge, Jutta Deide-Lüchow and Galerie Morgenland (1992). Bunkerleben und Kinderlandverschickung: Eimsbüttler Jugend im Krieg. Dölling und Galitz. ISBN 3-926174-46-3.
- Gerhard Dabel (1981). Dokumentations-Arbeitsgemeinschaft KLV. Schillinger. ISBN 3921340608.
- Eva Gehrken (1997). "Nationalsozialistische Erziehung in den Lagern der Erweiterten Kinderlandverschickung 1940 bis 1945". Steinhorster Schriften und Materialien zur Regionalen Schulgeschichte und Schulentwicklung. 8. Technische Universität Braunschweig.
- Jost Hermand (1997). A Hitler Youth in Poland: The Nazis' Program for Evacuating Children During World War II. Translated by Margot B. Dembo. Northwestern University Press. ISBN 0810112922.
- Wolfgang Keim (1997). Erziehung unter der Nazi-Diktatur: Kriegsvorbereitung, Krieg und Holocaust. Wissenschaftliche Buchgesellschaft. ISBN 3-89678-036-0.
- Gerhard Kock (1997). "Der Führer sorgt für unsere Kinder" – Die Kinderlandverschickung im Zweiten Weltkrieg. Schöningh. ISBN 3-506-74663-4.
- Carsten Kressel (1996). Evakuierungen und erweiterte Kinderlandverschickung im Vergleich: das Beispiel der Städte Liverpool und Hamburg. P. Lang. ISBN 3-631-30532-X.
- Gerhard Rempel (1989). Hitler's Children: The Hitler Youth and the SS. UNC Press Books. ISBN 0807842990.
