= Ranks and insignia of the National Socialist Motor Corps =

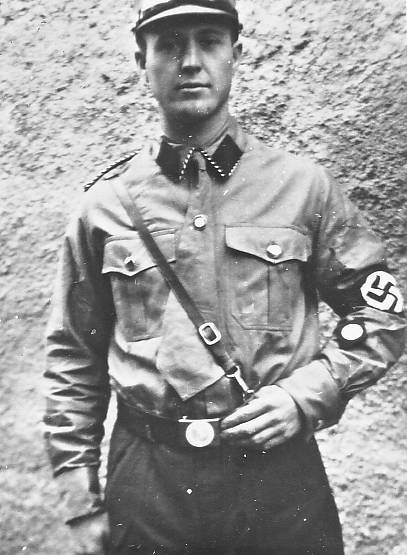
NSKK basic rank.

Ranks and insignia of the National Socialist Motor Corps.

Ranks and insignia for medical staff of the NSKK; shoulder insignia and head gear for all members.

The ranks and insignia of the National Socialist Motor Corps (Nationalsozialistisches Kraftfahrkorps, abbr. NSKK) were a paramilitary rank system in Germany used between the years of 1931 and 1945. They were based closely on the ranks and insignia of the Sturmabteilung (SA), of which the NSKK was originally a part.

== Rank insignia ==
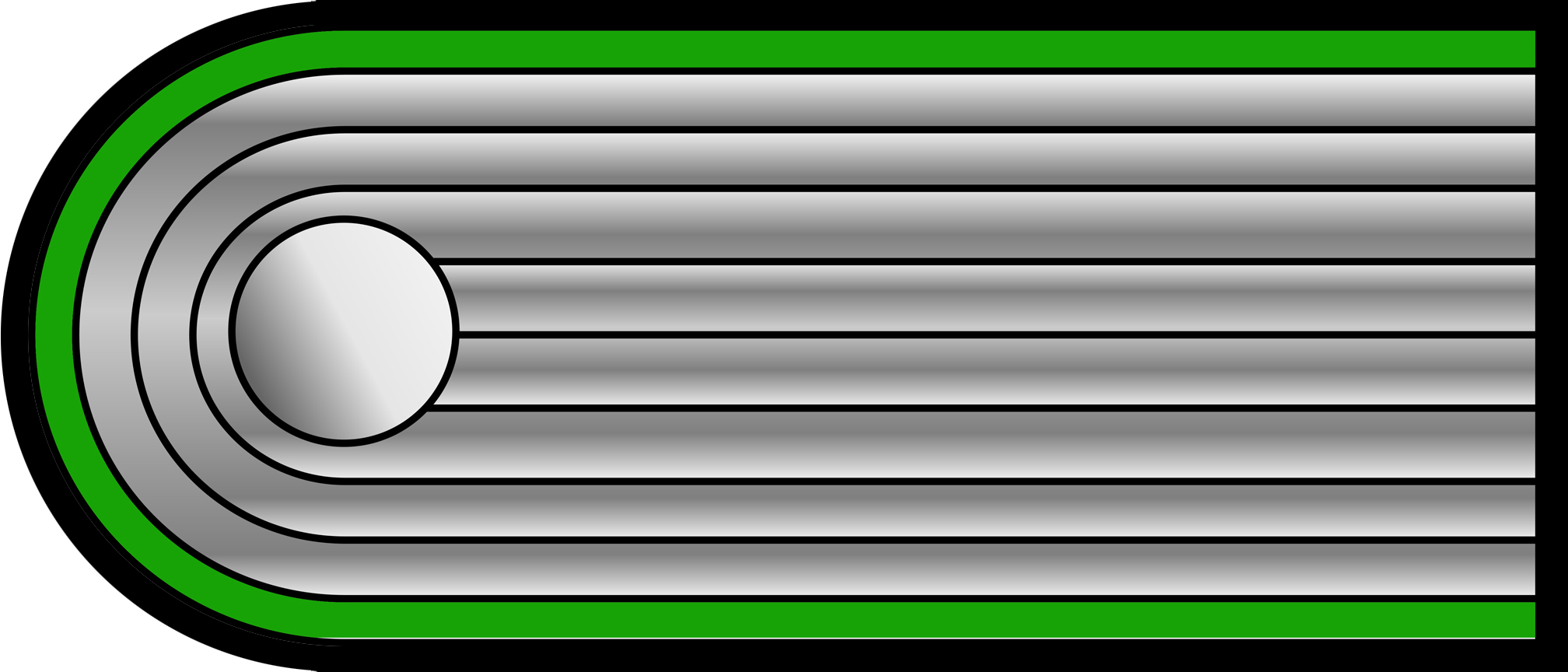
Collar insignia	Shoulder insignia	NSKK rank	Translation	Heer equivalent
		Korpsführer	Corps leader	Generalfeldmarschall
		Obergruppenführer	Senior group leader	General
		Gruppenführer	Group leader	Generalleutnant
		Brigadeführer	Brigade leader	Generalmajor
		Oberführer	Senior leader	Oberst
		Standartenführer	Regiment leader	Oberst
		Oberstaffelführer	Senior squadron leader	Oberstleutnant
		Staffelführer	Squadron leader	Major
		Hauptsturmführer	Chief assault leader	Hauptmann
		Obersturmführer	Senior assault leader	Oberleutnant
		Sturmführer	Assault leader	Leutnant
		Haupttruppführer	Head troop leader	Stabsfeldwebel
		Obertruppführer	Senior troop leader	Oberfeldwebel
		Truppführer	Troop leader	Feldwebel
		Oberscharführer	Senior squad leader	Unterfeldwebel
		Scharführer	Squad leader	Unteroffizier
		Rottenführer	Section leader	Obergefreiter
		Sturmmann	Storm trooper	Gefreiter
	None	Mann	Trooper	Soldat

== Unit insignia ==
For all ranks of Oberstaffelführer and below, the NSKK displayed a unit collar patch, worn on the right collar, opposite the badge of rank. This unit badge displayed a member's Sturm (Company) number, followed by the number of the motorised regiment to which they belonged within the National Socialist Motor Corps.

== See also ==
- Comparative ranks of Nazi Germany
