= Friedrich Christiansen =

German general (1879–1972)

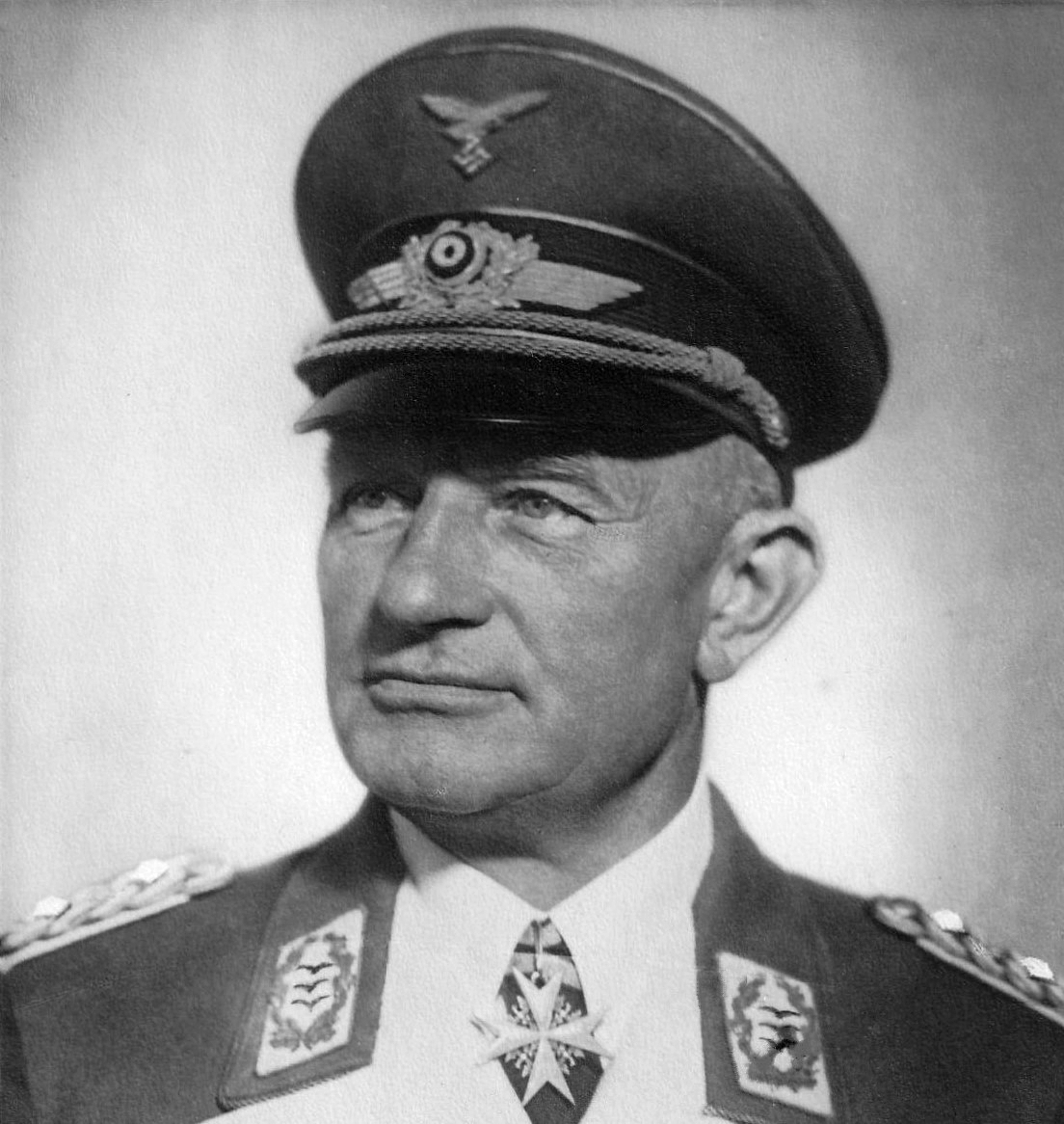
- Christiansen, c. 1937

Wehrmachtbefehlshaber in the Netherlands
- In office 29 May 1940 – 7 April 1945
- Preceded by: Office established
- Succeeded by: Office abolished

Korpsführer of the NSFK
- In office 5 April 1937 – 26 June 1943
- Preceded by: Office established
- Succeeded by: Alfred Keller

Personal details
- Born: 12 December 1879 Wyk auf Föhr, Kingdom of Prussia, German Empire
- Died: 3 December 1972 (aged 92) Aukrug, West Germany

Military service
- Allegiance: German Empire; Weimar Republic; Nazi Germany
- Branch/service: Imperial German Navy; Luftwaffe
- Years of service: 1914–1919; 1934–1945
- Rank: Kapitän zur See; General der Flieger
- Commands: 25th Army
- Battles/wars: World War I World War II
- Awards: Pour le Mérite

Friedrich Christiansen (12 December 1879 – 3 December 1972) was a German general and war criminal who served as commander of the German Wehrmacht in the occupied Netherlands during World War II.

Christiansen was a World War I flying ace and the only seaplane pilot to receive the Pour le Mérite. He joined the Nazi Party in the interwar period, eventually rising to the rank of Korpsführer of the National Socialist Flyers Corps. After the German invasion of the Netherlands, Christiansen was appointed as the Wehrmachtbefehlshaber (Chief Military Commander) in the Netherlands. In response to attacks by the Dutch resistance, he ordered reprisals against Dutch civilians such as the Putten raid. He was also responsible for the Dutch famine of 1944–1945 that resulted in the deaths of thousands of civilians after ordering an embargo on all food transports to the western Netherlands.

After the war, Christiansen was arrested and convicted of war crimes and sentenced to 12 years imprisonment.

== Early life ==
He was born in Wyk auf Föhr, Province of Schleswig-Holstein, into an old seafaring family, the son of a sea captain. The generations-long seafaring tradition within his family charted an obvious course for his future. In 1895 he joined the merchant marine, serving for 7 years and volunteering in 1901 for MTBs. After one year, he returned to the merchant marine, serving several years aboard the 5-masted Preussen (at the time, the largest sailing ship in the world,) as Second Officer. In 1913 he decided to deviate from this career, and learned to fly. Having graduated and gaining licence No. 707, he became a flying instructor at a civilian flying school.

== Service during World War I ==
Christiansen in 1918

In August 1914, Christiansen was called up and posted to Zeebrugge as naval aviator. He flew Hansa-Brandenburg W.12 seaplanes over the North Sea, the English Channel, and Britain. For his bombing missions on Dover and Ramsgate, he was awarded the Iron Cross 2nd Class. From 1915 to 1916 Christiansen went on numerous reconnaissance and bombing missions, helping to make his unit at Zeebrugge one of the most successful in the German Naval Air Service. On 27 April 1916, as Leutnant der Matrosen Artillerie (Lieutenant of Naval Artillery,) Christiansen was awarded the Iron Cross 1st Class and Knights Cross with Swords of the House Order of Hohenzollern.

Christiansen claimed his first air-to-air victory 15 May 1917 by shooting down a Sopwith Pup off Dover. On 1 September 1917 he took command of Naval Air Station at Zeebrugge, and being promoted to Oberleutnant zur See, shot down a Porte FB2 Baby off Felixstowe the same day. On 11 December 1917 he shot down the non-rigid coastal class airship C-27, Cdr. Flight Lieutenant John Francis Dixon, DSC, near the Belgian coast.

Christiansen continued to carry out reconnaissance, rescue, and bombing missions, such that by December 1917, he had completed 440 missions, including shooting down Airship C27. At this time he was also awarded the Pour le Mérite ("Blue Max"), the first of only three given to naval aviators and the only one to a seaplane pilot. He was promoted to Kapitänleutnant in 1918.

On 15 February 1918 Christiansen shot down a Curtiss H12B flying boat off Felixstowe, followed by two more on 24 April and 25 April. In June he claimed three more Felixstowe F2As. On 6 July he surprised and damaged British submarine HMS C25 in the Thames estuary, killing its captain and five crewmen (the submarine reached harbour). By 11 November 1918 he raised his personal tally to 13, as well as some shared victories, which cumulatively may have brought his total to 21.

== Activity between wars ==
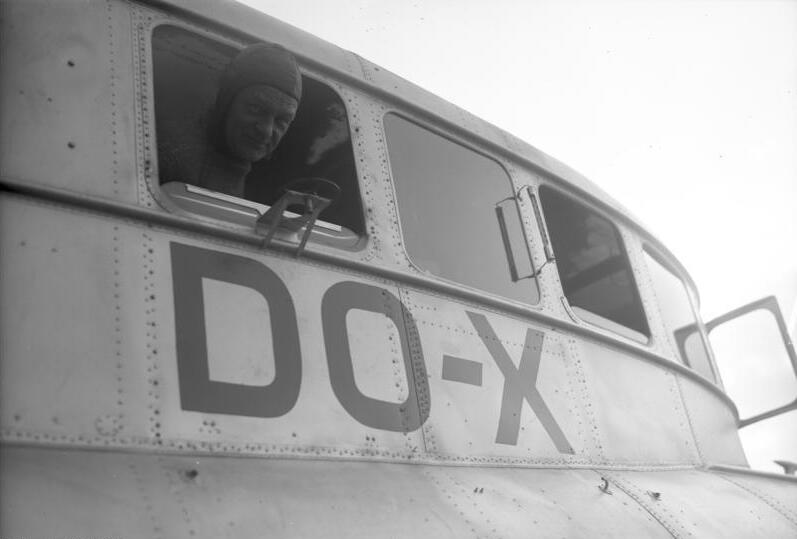
Christiansen piloting a Dornier Do X, 1930

Following the German Revolution of late 1918, Christiansen was a member of the 3rd Marinebrigade commanded by Wilfried von Loewenfeld. In 1922 Christiansen was active again in the merchant marine, as a ship's captain. He continued in this pursuit until 1929, when he was employed as a pilot by the Claude Dornier Company. While with Dornier, he flew what was at the time the largest seaplane in the world, the Dornier Do X on its maiden Atlantic flight to New York in 1930. Christiansen's distinguished career led him eventually to being called to a post in the Reichsluftfahrtministerium (RLM/Reich Aviation Ministry) from 1933 to 1937, and in 1936 he was promoted to Generalmajor. On 15 April 1937 he was appointed Korpsführer of the National Socialist Flyers Corps, or NSFK. He was also promoted to Generalleutnant. On 1 January 1939 he was named General der Flieger.

== Service during World War II ==
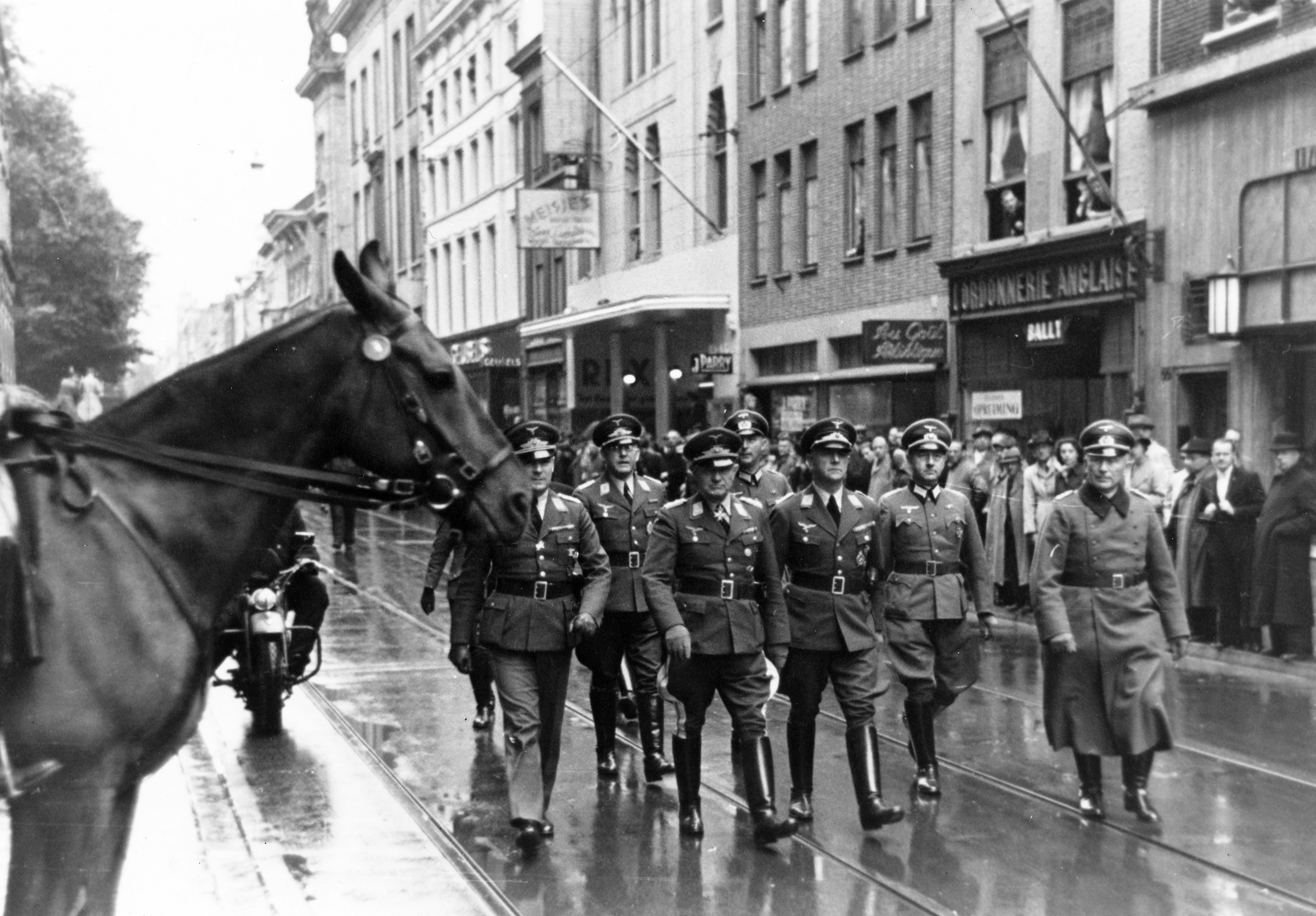
Christiansen (third from the left) arrives in The Hague after he was appointed as the supreme commander of Wehrmacht in the Netherlands, 1940

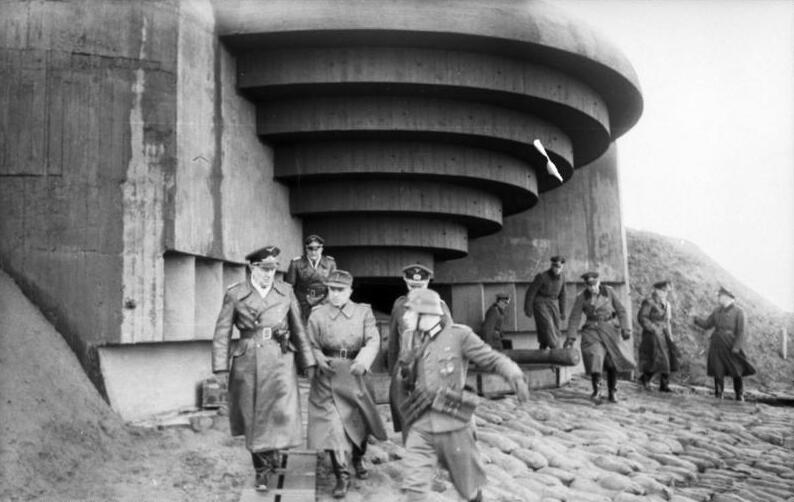
Christiansen (far left) inspecting a bunker of the Atlantic Wall in 1944

From 29 May 1940 until 7 April 1945 Christiansen was Wehrmachtbefehlshaber in den Niederlanden (Supreme Commander of the Wehrmacht in the Netherlands), and until 26 June 1943 was concurrently still Korpsführer of the NSFK. In addition, from 10 November 1944 until 28 January 1945 supreme commander of the 25th Army. Christiansen also was responsible for the food embargo in winter 1944, causing famine in western Holland resulting in the death of 22000 civilian men, women and children.

After the war Christiansen was arrested for war crimes. On 2 October 1944 he had ordered a raid on the village of Putten in Gelderland, the Netherlands, in retaliation, after one of his officers, a Leutnant Sommers, was killed there by the Dutch resistance. When he heard about the actions of the resistance near Putten, Christiansen is reported to have said, "Das ganze Nest muss angesteckt werden und die ganze Bande an die Wand gestellt!" ("Put them all against the wall and burn the place down!") In compliance with this retributive sentiment, several members of the civilian population were shot, the village was burned, and 661 of the males of the town were deported to labor camps, the vast majority of whom never returned.

Christiansen was sentenced to 12 years imprisonment in 1948 in Arnhem for war crimes but was released in December 1951. He died in Aukrug in 1972.

His release from imprisonment in 1951 was an occasion for his native town, Wyk auf Föhr, to renew Christiansen's honorary citizenship and reinstate a street name in his honor, previously changed by the British military administration in 1945. These honors sparked controversies in Germany and the Netherlands and they were revoked in 1980 by the town council.

== Decorations and awards ==
- Pour le Mérite (11 December 1917)
- German Cross in Silver (1 June 1943)
- Prussian Royal House Order of Hohenzollern, Knight's Cross with Swords (27 April 1916)
- Prussian Iron Cross of 1914
  - 1st Class (27 April 1916)
  - 2nd Class (March 1915)
- Prussian Lifesaving Medal (20 August 1917)
- Hanseatic Cross of Hamburg (World War I decoration)
- German Navy Seaplane Pilot's Badge (World War I decoration)
- Golden Party Badge of the NSDAP (30 January 1939)
- War Merit Cross
  - 1st class with Swords (30 April 1941)
  - 2nd class with Swords (30 April 1941)
- The Honour Cross of the World War 1914/1918
- Combined Pilot/Observer Badge in Gold with Diamonds
- Wehrmacht Long Service Award, 4th class with 1st class

== Sources ==
- Bronnenkant, Lance J. (2019). "Friedrich Christiansen". The Blue Max Airmen: German Airmen Awarded the Pour le Mérite. Vol. 13: Keller, Christiansen, Bongartz. n.p.: Aeronaut Books. pp. 26–81. ISBN 978-1-935881-71-1.
- Franks, Norman L. R. et al. Above the Lines: The Aces and Fighter Units of the German Air Service, Naval Air Service and Flanders Marine Corps 1914 - 1918 Grub Street, 1993. ISBN 0-948817-73-9, ISBN 978-0-948817-73-1.
- O'Connor, M. Airfields & Airmen of the Channel Coast. Pen & Sword Military, 2005 ISBN 1-84415-258-8
- Guttman, Jon (2003), Naval Aces of World War 1 part 2 (Aircraft of the Aces 104), Osprey Publishing, ISBN 978-1-84908664-6
- T. C. Treadwell & A. C. Wood, German Knights of the Air, 1914-1918; The Holders of the Orden Pour Le Merite, Barnes & Nobel Books (UK) Ltd, 1997.

Military offices
Preceded by None	Commander of 25. Armee; 10 November 1944 - 28 January 1945	Succeeded by General der Infanterie Günther Blumentritt
