= Helmut Möckel (politician) =

German politician (1909–1945)

Stabsführer of the Hitler Youth
- In office 26 May 1940 – 15 February 1945
- Preceded by: Hartmann Lauterbacher
- Succeeded by: Kurt Petter

Personal details
- Born: 21 June 1909 Vielau, Saxony, German Empire
- Died: 15 February 1945 (aged 35) Darmstadt, Hesse, Nazi Germany
- Party: National Socialist German Workers' Party (NSDAP)
- Profession: Youth leader, politician
- Awards: War Merit Cross 2nd class with swords War Merit Cross 1st class with swords Knight's Cross of the War Merit Cross with swords

Helmut Möckel (21 June 1909 – 15 February 1945) was a German youth leader and politician.

== Background ==
Möckel was born in Vielau near Zwickau in Saxony. After completing his school education he studied education and economics at Technische Universität Dresden and political science at University of Vienna. He helped found the National Socialist Teachers League in 1929 and joined the Nazi Party in 1930. From 1930 to 1933 he was a member of the SS. He became a full-time field leader of the Hitler Youth in 1933 and staff director in 1935.

On 16 July 1937, Möckel became chief of the Office of Procurement for the Reich Youth Leadership. In April 1938 he was proposed, unsuccessfully, for membership of the Reichstag. He returned to Saxony to become a Hitler Youth field guide and was promoted to Gebietsführer for Saxony in August 1938. During his time as a Hitler Youth leader he wrote books on the subject of youth training.

== World War II ==
At the outbreak of World War II in 1939, he was drafted into the Wehrmacht and trained as a fighter pilot. However, in August 1940 he was recalled to Berlin where he was appointed Stabsführer of the Hitler Youth and deputy to Reichsjugendführer Baldur von Schirach. In October 1940 he was appointed by von Schirach to oversee the day-to-day operation of Kinderlandverschickung ("relocation of children to the countryside") from major cities at risk of aerial bombing.

In November 1942, Möckel became a member of the Reichstag, from electoral constituency 7, Breslau. On 11 February 1945 he was awarded the Ritterkreuz des Kriegsverdienstkreuzes mit Schwertern (Knight's Cross of the War Merit Cross with swords).

== Death ==
Möckel was killed in a car accident in Darmstadt on 15 February 1945 whilst recruiting Hitler Youth volunteers for Operation Werwolf. The crash also killed the driver and another Hitler Youth leader. There were rumours that his death was faked and he had fled to Francoist Spain, but this has never been substantiated.

He was succeeded as Stabsführer by Kurt Petter.
