= Staffelführer =

German SS paramilitary rank

Function badge of a Staffelführer

Staffelführer ([ˈʃtafl̩ˌfyːʁɐ], "Formation leader") was one of the first paramilitary ranks used by the German Schutzstaffel (SS) in the early years of that group's existence. The later SS rank of Staffelführer traces its origins to the First World War, where the title was used by commanding officers of the Deutsches Heer's Luftstreitkräfte aircraft squadrons initially named as Feldflieger Abteilung as observation-only units in 1914, and during 1916, became known as Staffeln.

The rank of Staffelführer was first created in September 1925 when the SS was officially formed along the lines of the previously disbanded Stosstrupp Adolf Hitler, which had been a personal Sturmabteilung bodyguard detachment tasked with the personal protection of Adolf Hitler at Nazi Party rallies and meetings.

The early SS was formed into several Zehnerstaffeln, or "groups of ten". Each SS unit comprised no more than ten SS-Mann under the command of an SS-Staffelführer, or squadron leader. The Staffelführer in turn answered to a local SS-Gauführer, or district leader, who answered to the national leader of the SS, known as the Reichsführer-SS.

By April 1926, the basic SS unit had become the larger SS-Sturm which comprised as many as fifty SS troopers. The rank of Staffelführer, at this point, became known simply as SS-Führer. In 1929, the rank of SS-Führer was officially renamed as SS-Sturmführer. By 1930, the rank of SS-Staffelführer had all but disappeared from the SS. It reappeared the following year, in 1931, as a rank of the NSKK. NSKK Staffelführer's headed up Motorstaffeln (transport regiments). The NSKK Staffelführer rank was considered equivalent to the SS rank of sturmbannführer, the army and airforce ranks of major and the navy rank of korvettenkapitän.

In the early years of its existence, SS-Staffelführer had no particular insignia and holders of the rank simply wore paramilitary uniforms with a variety of Nazi insignia. By 1929, an SS-Staffelführer could be identified by a swastika armband with a white circular stripe.
