= Oberführer =

Officer's rank in the Schutzstaffel (SS)

- SS Gorget patch
- Country: Nazi Germany
- Service branch: Schutzstaffel; Sturmabteilung; National Socialist Motor Corps; National Socialist Flyers Corps
- Abbreviation: Oberf
- NATO rank code: OF-5
- Formation: 1921; 105 years ago
- Abolished: 1945; 81 years ago
- Next higher rank: Brigadeführer
- Next lower rank: Standartenführer
- Equivalent ranks: Oberst

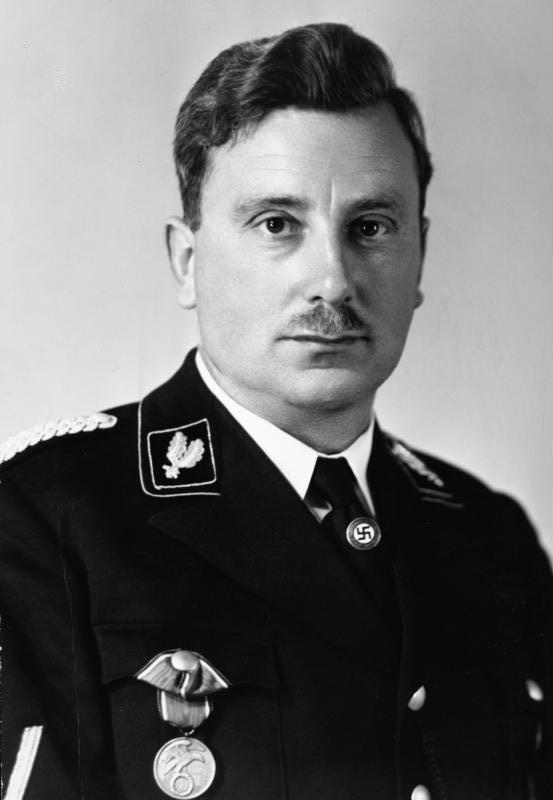
Emil Maurice as an Oberführer

Oberführer (short: Oberf, [ˈoːbɐfyːʁɐ], lit. 'senior leader') was an early paramilitary rank of the Nazi Party (NSDAP) dating back to 1921. An Oberführer was typically an NSDAP member in charge of a group of paramilitary units in a particular geographical region. From 1921 to 1925, the phrase Oberführer was used as a title in the Sturmabteilung (SA), but became an actual SA rank after 1926.

Oberführer was also a rank of the Schutzstaffel (SS, at that time a branch of the SA), established in 1925 as Gauführer, a rank for SS officers in charge of SS personnel in the several Gaue throughout Germany; in 1928 the rank was renamed Oberführer, and used of the commanders of the three regional SS-Oberführerbereiche. In 1930, the SS was reorganized into SS-Gruppen and Brigaden, at which time Oberführer became subordinate to the higher rank of Brigadeführer. By 1932, Oberführer was an established rank of the SA, SS and NSKK.

Oberführer wore two oak leaves on the uniform collar rank patch, along with the shoulder boards and lapels of a general officer. In 1938, the status of SS-Oberführer began to change with the rise of the SS-Verfügungstruppe (SS-VT), which would later become the Waffen-SS. Since Brigadeführer was rated equal to a Generalmajor, and Standartenführer to an Oberst, Oberführer had no military equivalent and quickly became regarded as a senior colonel rank. This distinction continues in historical circles with most texts referring to Oberführer as a senior colonel rank while some others state it was a military equivalent to a British Army brigadier.

== Rank insignia ==
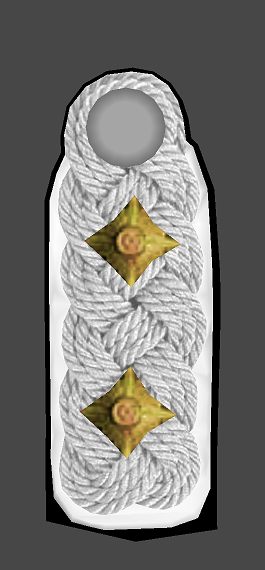
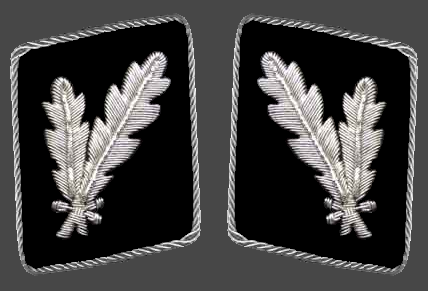
Oberführer SS, SA, NSKK, and NSFK
Rank insignia: Shoulder insignia; Camo insignia; Gorget patch	Schutzstaffel (SS)		Sturmabteilung (SA)	NS Motor Corps (NSKK)	NS Flyers Corps (NSFK)
Rank insignia: Shoulder insignia; Camo insignia; Gorget patch	Waffen-SS	Allgemeine-SS; Waffen-SS	collar insignia

Junior Rank; Standartenführer	SS rank and SA rank Oberführer	Senior Rank; Brigadeführer

== See also ==
- Corps colours (Waffen-SS)
- Table of ranks and insignia of the Waffen-SS

== Bibliography ==
- Flaherty, T. H. (2004) [1988]. The Third Reich: The SS. Time-Life Books, Inc. ISBN 1-84447-073-3.
- McNab, Chris (2009). The SS: 1923–1945. Amber Books Ltd. ISBN 978-1-906626-49-5.
- McNab, Chris (2009b). The Third Reich. Amber Books Ltd. ISBN 978-1-906626-51-8.
- Miller, Michael (2006). Leaders of the SS and German Police, Vol. 1. R. James Bender Publishing. ISBN 93-297-0037-3.
- Yerger, Mark C. (1997). Allgemeine-SS: The Commands, Units and Leaders of the General SS. Schiffer Publishing Ltd. ISBN 0-7643-0145-4.
