= Kurt Petter =

German physician, youth leader and educational administrator (1909–1969)

Stabsführer of the Hitler Youth
- Preceded by: Helmut Möckel
- Succeeded by: Office abolished

Personal details
- Born: 3 February 1909 Dorndorf, Germany
- Died: 3 October 1969 (aged 60) Hamburg, Germany
- Party: National Socialist German Workers' Party (NSDAP)
- Spouse: Carin Lennman-Petter
- Profession: Physician, youth leader, educational administrator

Kurt Petter (3 February 1909 – 3 October 1969) was a German physician, youth leader and educational administrator.

Petter was born in 1909, the son of Bernhard and Marie Petter. He studied medicine at the University of Würzburg, University of Bonn and the Ludwig-Maximilians-Universität München (LMU). During his final exam period he was pediatrician to the Hitler Youth in Jena.

He was appointed Hitler Youth area leader for Weimar region in 1933. In 1939 he was appointed head of the Reichsführerschule in Potsdam. In January 1937 he served as an inspector-general of the Adolf Hitler Schools with the rank of Gebietsführer. On 20 April 1942 he was promoted to Obergebietsführer and served as Deputy to Artur Axmann and as head of the Adolf Hitler Schools. From February to May 1945, he was acting Stabsführer of the Hitler Youth following the death of Helmut Möckel.

He was also a senior physician advising on physical and nutritional requirements for former Hitler Youth joining the German Army. During April and May 1945 he served as Regimental Medical Officer to the 96th SS Panzer Grenadier Regiment, 38th SS Division Nibelungen of the Waffen-SS.

Petter was interned after the war and upon his release moved to Sweden. He married Carin Lennman (1912-1989), daughter of Lieutenant Henning Fredrik Gustaf Lennman (1879-1947) and Margarethe Lennman, geb. Eitze (1882-1965). Henning was son of Konteradmiral of the Royal Swedish Navy Fredrik Wilhelm Lennman (1840-1917) and Alice Lennman, geb. von Heidenstam (1850-1926).

He worked as a pediatrician in his own medical practice in Hamburg, Germany until his death in 1969 and is buried in Nättraby.
