= Stabsführer =

Rank in various Nazi German organizations

Staff Leader
- Stabsführer
- Standards for the Stabsführer of HJ, NSFK, NSKK and SA
- Nazi Party
- Status: Abolished
- Member of: Hitler Youth; National Socialist Flyers Corps; National Socialist Motor Corps; Sturmabteilung
- Reports to: Reichsjugendführer (HJ); Korpsführer (NSFK); Korpsführer (NSKK); Stabschef (SA)
- Appointer: Führer of the NSDAP
- Formation: November 1931
- Abolished: May 1945

A Stabsführer (translated as Staff Leader) served as a deputy to the leader of Hitler Youth, National Socialist Flyers Corps, National Socialist Motor Corps or Sturmabteilung. It was furthermore a Hitler Youth paramilitary rank held by the senior most member of the Adult Leadership Corps.

The SS-Oberabschnitt (major districts) and SS-Abschnitt (sub districts) of the Allgemeine SS each had their own Stabsführer to head certain staff of the district. In the SS-Abschnitt they were often the de facto leader.

== Office holders ==
=== Hitler Youth ===
Hitler Youth Stabsführer shoulder insignia

No.	Portrait	Stabsführer	Took office	Left office	Time in office
1	Karl Nabersberg	Karl Nabersberg (1908–1946)	November 1931	June 1934	2 years, 7 months
2	Hartmann Lauterbacher	Hartmann Lauterbacher (1909–1988)	22 May 1934	August 1940	6 years, 2 months
3	Helmut Möckel	Helmut Möckel (1909–1945)	August 1940	15 February 1945 †	4 years, 6 months
-	Kurt Petter	Kurt Petter (1909–1969); Acting	15 February 1945	8 May 1945	2 months

=== NSFK ===
No.	Portrait	Stabsführer	Took office	Left office	Time in office
1	Gerhard Sporleder	Obergruppenführer; Gerhard Sporleder (1893–?)	1937	1941	3–4 years
2	Karl Sauke [de]	Obergruppenführer; Karl Sauke (1897–1958)	1941	1944	2–3 years
3	Arno Kehrberg	Gruppenführer; Arno Kehrberg (1894–?)	1944	1945	0–1 years

=== NSKK ===
No.	Portrait	Stabsführer	Took office	Left office	Time in office
1	Adolf Ritter von Denk	Obergruppenführer; Adolf Ritter von Denk (1886–?)	1937	1945	7–8 years

=== SA ===
No.	Portrait	Stabsführer	Took office	Left office	Time in office
1	Otto Herzog	Obergruppenführer; Otto Herzog (1900–1945)	1 May 1936	14 June 1939	3 years, 44 days
2	Max Jüttner	Obergruppenführer; Max Jüttner (1883–1963)	15 June 1939	8 May 1945	5 years, 327 days

== See also ==
- Stabschef
