= Transportkorps Speer =

Government agency

Agency overview
- Formed: 1944
- Dissolved: 1945
- Type: Paramilitary
- Jurisdiction: German-occupied Europe
- Headquarters: Kreuzbruch, near Oranienburg
- Employees: 70,000
- Oberkommando der Wehrmacht responsible: Generalfeldmarschall Wilhelm Keitel
- Agency executive: Generalmajor Wilhelm Nagel, Korpskommandant

Transportkorps Speer was created in 1944 from Legion Speer and the units of the National Socialist Motor Corps that was serving the Organisation Todt. Shortly after its creation it became subordinated to the Wehrmacht. Yet, its major mission remained in support of OT, which at this time was mainly engaged in rebuilding and repair of bomb damaged industrial facilities and housing complexes. Transportkorps Speer was organized in motor transportation battalions and regiments, supported by depot, repair, engineering, signal, and medical units.

== Creation ==
The Nationalsozialistisches Kraftfahrkorps (NSKK) supplied the motor vehicle transportation for the Organisation Todt, the civil and military engineering organization in Nazi Germany, until 1944. The NSKK-Transportbrigade Todt was in charge of motor transportation for the construction of the Siegfried Line. NSKK-Transportbrigade Speer was in charge of the motor transportation for the air base constructions of the OT. Foreign drivers were recruited into the Legion Speer, since they - as aliens - could not be members of the NSKK, which was a sub-organization of the Nazi Party. In 1942, Transportbrigade Todt, Transportbrigade Speer, and Legion Speer, was subsumed into an umbrella organization, Transportgruppe Todt, which in 1944 was made into an organization independent of the NSKK, the Transportkorps Speer. On 12 September 1944, Transportkorps Speer was transferred to Wehrmacht control.

== Mission ==
In the fall of 1944, most of the OT was withdrawn from occupied Europe to Germany proper, the Reich area. It new task was rebuilding and repair of bomb damaged industrial facilities and housing complex. Mobility was of utmost importance, and the primary OT-units were assigned motor vehicles from Transportkorps Speer. The lack of vehicles prevented the secondary OT-units from being motorized. The Ministry of Armament, the Luftwaffe, and the German Army also had Transportkorps Speer units attached. The OT was, however, its largest employer. Of Transportkorps Speer's 50,000 motor vehicles, 40,000 were assigned to the OT.

== Organisation ==
Transportkorps Speer was a separate agency closely working with the OT; mutual salutes were to be exchanged between members of both organizations.

The OT was serviced by a number of Kraftwagentransportabteilungen (motor vehicle transportation battalions). Transportregiment (Transport Regiment) 2 and 3 served the Luftwaffe. Transport Regiment 5-12, the German Army. In addition, there were Ersatzabteilungen (Depot Battalions), Kraftfahrinstandesetzungsregimenter (Vehicle Repair Regiments), Pionierabteilung (Engineering Battalion), Nachrichtenstaffel (independent signal company), Sanitätskraftfahrstaffel (independent medical company), and an Sicherungssabteilung (Escort Battalion).

The higher organization of the Transportkorps Speer was originally made up of eight Abschnitte (sectors). In August 1944, four division-level Inspektionen (inspections) replaced the eight sectors, while in February 1945, the four inspections were replaced by six Intendante (supply commands). As late as in April 1945, the remnants of Transportkorps Speer was reorganized as three brigades; one for Norway, Denmark, and northern Germany; one for central Germany and the Protectorate of Bohemia and Moravia; and one for Ostmark, northern Italy, and northern Yugoslavia.

== Disbandment ==
Transportkorps Speer ceased to function as an operational organization before Germany capitulated. At the end of the war, all of its vehicles that were not taken over by the Wehrmacht, were standing still due to the lack of fuel.

== Ranks ==
Insignia		Rank	Wehrmacht War Service; Pay Group	Comparative rank in the Wehrmacht
Collar	Shoulder	Rank	Wehrmacht War Service; Pay Group	Comparative rank in the Wehrmacht
		Korpskommandant	2	General d. Infanterie
		Gruppenkommandant	3	Generalleutnant
		Brigadekommandant	4	Generalmajor
		Oberstkapitän	5	Oberst
		Oberfeldkapitän	6	Oberstleutnant
		Oberstabskapitän	7	Major
		Stabskapitän	8	Hauptmann
		Oberfeldkornett	9	Oberleutnant
		Feldkornett	10	Leutnant
		Stabsfahrmeister	11	Stabsfeldwebel
		Hauptfahrmeister	11	Oberfeldwebel
		Oberfahrmeister	12	Feldwebel
		Fahrmeister	13	Unterfeldwebel
		Unterfahrmeister	14	Unteroffizier
		Stabskraftfahrer	15	Stabsgefreiter
		Hauptkraftfahrer	15	Obergefreiter
		Oberkraftfaher	16 (after two years 15)	Gefreiter
		Kraftfahrer	16 (after two years 15)	Grenadier

Troop colours:

- Black: General Service
- Green: Administration
- Light blue: Supply
- Blue: Medical
- Pink: Engineer
- Wine red: Judicial
- Grey: Special service
