= Adolf Hühnlein =

Nazi Party paramilitary leader (1881–1942)

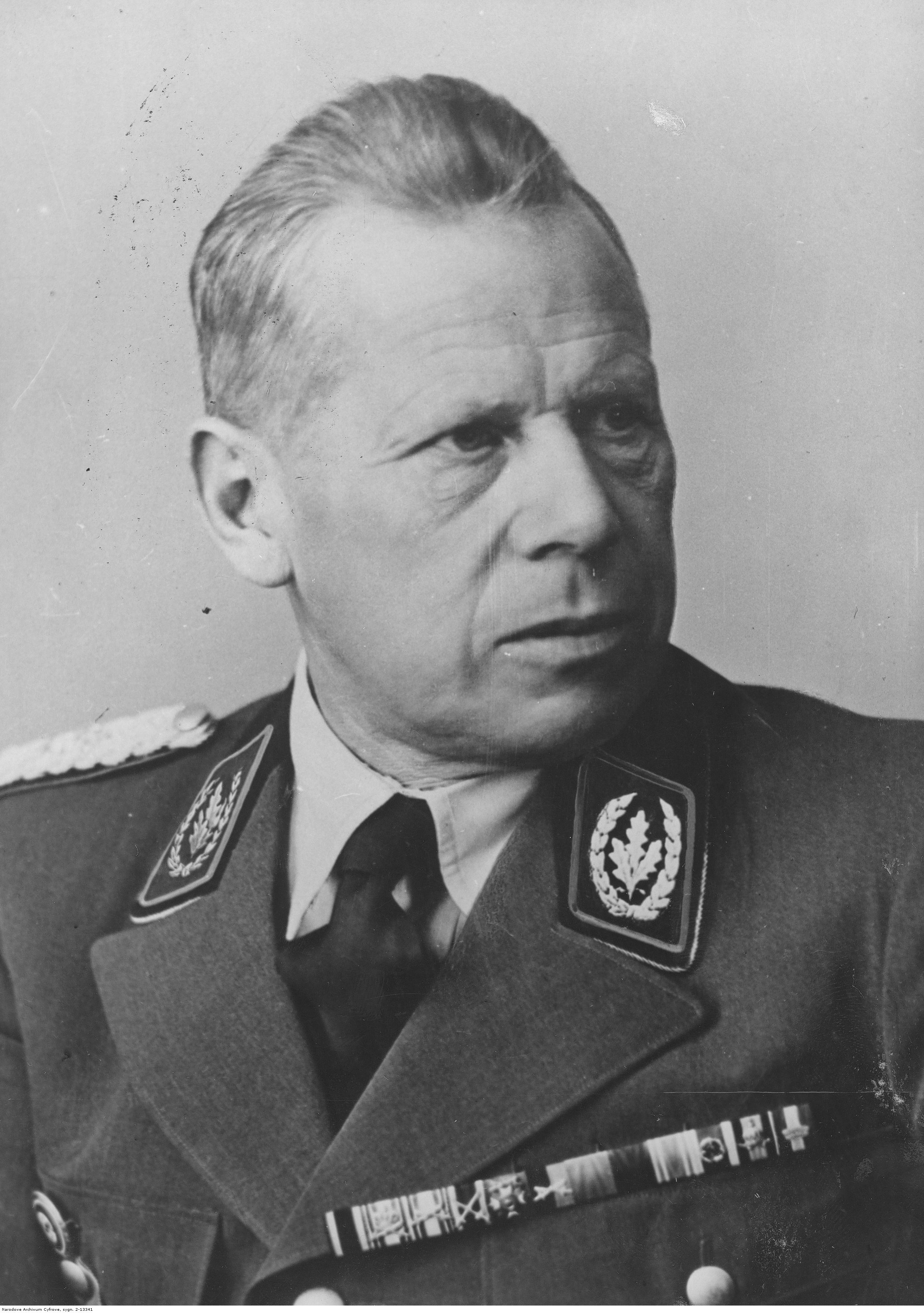
- c. 1942

Korpsführer of the NSKK
- In office 30 April 1933 – 18 June 1942
- Deputy: Josef Seydel
- Preceded by: Office established
- Succeeded by: Erwin Kraus

Reichsleiter
- In office 8 September 1938 – 18 June 1942

Personal details
- Born: 12 September 1881 Neustädtlein, Upper Franconia
- Died: 18 June 1942 (aged 60) Munich, Germany
- Cause of death: Cancer
- Party: Nazi Party
- Spouse: Paula Däumling (m. 1909)
- Children: 3
- Occupation: Military officer
- Civilian awards: German Order; Blood Order; Golden Party Badge

Military service
- Allegiance: German Empire; Weimar Republic
- Years of service: 1900–1924
- Rank: Generalmajor
- Unit: 15th Royal Bavarian Infantry Division
- Battles/wars: World War I
- Military awards: Iron Cross, 1st and 2nd class

Adolf Hühnlein (12 September 1881 – 18 June 1942) was a German soldier and Nazi Party (NSDAP) official. He was the Korpsführer (Corps Leader) of the National Socialist Motor Corps (NSKK) from 1933 until his death in 1942.

== Early years ==
Hühnlein was born in Neustädtlein, Upper Franconia the son of a teacher. He attended volksschule and gymnasium in Bayreuth until 1900 and then entered the Royal Bavarian Army. He was commissioned a Leutnant in September 1902. He married his wife Paula (nee Däumling) in 1906 and the couple had three daughters, one of whom died in infancy. He was promoted to Oberleutnant in 1908 and attended the Bavarian War Academy from 1909 to 1912. Promoted to Hauptmann in 1913, Hühnlein served in World War I, as a company and battalion commander, obtaining the rank of Major. From 1917, he was a general staff officer with the 15th Royal Bavarian Infantry Division. He was decorated with the Iron Cross, second class and first class. After the war, he was a company commander in the Freikorps Epp from 1919 to 1920. He remained in the military, serving in the Reichswehr of the Weimar Republic.

== Nazi Party and SA membership ==
Hühnlein first heard Adolf Hitler speak in the barracks of the Royal Bavarian Infantry Lifeguards Regiment in 1919. He later described Hitler's effect on him thusly:

I was possessed by his philosophical outlook on the world, it drew me to him, held me fast, and inspired that sort of disciplineship which only ends with death.

By 1923, he was a member of both the Sturmabteilung (SA), and Ernst Röhm's short-lived anti-Semitic nationalist Bund Reichskriegsflagge (Imperial War Flag Society). He participated in the Beer Hall Putsch, the unsuccessful attempt by Hitler and the Nazi Party to seize power in Munich on 9 November 1923, for which he would be awarded the Blood Order. He then was held in investigative detention from November 1923 to March 1924 at Stadelheim prison, Neudeck and Landsberg Prison. Discharged from the Reichswehr in March 1924, he was sentenced to six months' incarceration at Landsberg for his role in the failed putsch. There he joined Hitler and other conspirators. This event would set Hühnlein on a life of Nazi politics and he rose through the ranks after being released from prison.

Hühnlein worked as a businessman in the tire industry from 1925 to 1930. That year, he joined the Nazi Party (membership number 375,705) and rejoined the SA, serving on the staff of its supreme command (Obersten Führung). On 1 April 1930 he joined the National Socialist Automobile Corps (NSAK), the motorized corps of the SA, and by December was appointed its Deputy Korpsführer. The NSAK was re-designated the National Socialist Motor Corps (NSKK) on 1 May 1931. Promoted to SA-Gruppenführer on that date, Hühnlein was named Quartermaster of the SA and Deputy to SA-Stabschef Ernst Röhm on 1 July 1932. On 1 January 1933, Hühnlein was promoted to SA-Obergruppenführer.

After the Nazi seizure of power at the end of January 1933, Hühnlein on 5 March was elected to the Reichstag as a deputy from electoral constituency 31, Württemberg. He would remain a member of this body until his death, switching to constituency 25, Lower Bavaria–Upper Palatinate, at the 1936 election.

== NSKK-Korpsführer ==
On 30 April 1933, Hühnlein was named NSKK-Korpsführer. On 2 September 1934, some two months after Röhm's death in the Night of the Long Knives, the NSKK was made an independent organization, free from SA oversight. It was a paramilitary organization with its own system of paramilitary ranks and the smallest of the Nazi Party paramilitary organizations. Under Hühnlein's leadership, the NSKK membership rose rapidly, from 30,000 men in April 1933 to 350,000 in September 1933, after absorbing all of Germany's private motor clubs. By 1939, there were 500,000 NSKK members.

The primary aim of the Corps was to educate its members in motoring skills and to transport NSDAP and SA officials/members. Hühnlein organized and supervised many propaganda-oriented racing events, such as the 2000 kilometer "Race through Germany." All race car drivers were required to become members of the NSKK. Hühnlein often presented the trophies at German Grand Prix races and made certain that Nazi flags and bunting covered the victory tribunes. The most famous race car driver that had to answer to Hühnlein was Bernd Rosemeyer, who drove the Auto Union Silver Arrow. From 1935 onward, the NSKK also provided training for panzer crews and drivers of the German Army. Working with Hühnlein, Heinz Guderian, the architect of Germany's panzer formations, was able to ensure the training of Germany's future tank and truck drivers, approximately 187,000 of them in the years 1933 to 1939.

In June 1933, Hühnlein was named leader of the German Motor Transport Association. In September 1933, he founded the German Automobile Club and became the president of the National Sports Authority for German Motor Sports. In December 1935, Hühnlein was made a member of the Reich Transportation Council and in 1936 made a member of the Academy for German Law. On 19 May 1936, he was raised to the rank of a Generalmajor (retired), in the Wehrmacht, and in December of that year was named to the Board of Directors of the Reichsautobahn Association. In addition, on 8 September 1938 he was appointed as an NSDAP Reichsleiter, the second highest political rank in the Nazi Party. After the outbreak of the Second World War, he was named by Reichsmarschall Hermann Göring, in his capacity as the head of the Four Year Plan, to be the "Representative for Motorized Transport of the War Economy" on 22 February 1940.

Hühnlein remained the NSKK-Korpsführer from 30 April 1933 until his death from cancer in Munich on 18 June 1942. He was honored with a state funeral on 21 June at which Joseph Goebbels provided the eulogy and Hitler laid a wreath on the coffin. He was posthumously awarded the Party's highest decoration, the German Order, on 22 June 1942. He was succeeded as NSKK-Korpsführer by NSKK-Obergruppenführer Erwin Kraus.

== Awards and decorations ==
- 1914 Iron Cross 2nd Class (1914)
- Military Merit Order (Bavaria) 4th Class with Swords (1915)
- 1914 Iron Cross 1st Class (1915)
- Military Merit Order (Bavaria) 4th Class with Crown and Swords (1919)
- Blood Order (number 8, 1934)
- War Merit Cross 2nd Class with Swords and 1st Class with Swords
- German Order (1942)

== Sources ==
- Angolia, John (1989). For Führer and Fatherland: Political & Civil Awards of the Third Reich. R. James Bender Publishing. ISBN 978-0912138169.
- Askey, Nigel (2014). Operation Barbarossa: The Complete Organisational Statistical Analysis Vol. IIb. Lulu. ISBN 978-1312413269.
- Bastian, Till: High Tech unterm Hakenkreuz. Von der Atombombe bis zur Weltraumfahrt. Militzke, Leipzig 2005, ISBN 3-86189-740-7, p. 45.
- Bruppacher, Paul (2008). Adolf Hitler und die Geschichte der NSDAP Teil 2: 1938 bis 1945. Books on Demand, GmbH. ISBN 978-3-8423-8627-3.
- Hamilton, Charles (1984). Leaders & Personalities of the Third Reich, Vol. 1. San Jose, CA: R. James Bender Publishing. ISBN 0-912138-27-0.
- Hochstetter, Dorothee: Motorisierung und „Volksgemeinschaft“. Das Nationalsozialistische Kraftfahrkorps (NSKK) 1931–1945. Oldenbourg, München 2004, ISBN 3-486-57570-8.
- McNab, Chris (2011). Hitler's Masterplan. Amber Books Ltd. ISBN 978-1907446962.
- Hans Christoph Graf von Seherr-Thoß (1972). "Hühnlein, Adolf". Neue Deutsche Biographie (in German). Vol. 9. Berlin: Duncker & Humblot. p. 732. (full text online).
- Miller, Michael D.; Schulz, Andreas (2015). Leaders of the Storm Troops. Vol. 1. Solihull, England: Helion & Company. ISBN 978-1-909982-87-1.
- Schmitz-Berning, Cornelia: Vokabular des Nationalsozialismus. de Gruyter, Berlin, New York 2000, ISBN 3-11-016888-X, p. 439.
- Stockhorst, Erich (1985). 5000 Köpfe: Wer War Was im 3. Reich. Kiel: Arndt Verlag. ISBN 978-3-887-41116-9.
- Weiß, Hermann (Hrsg.): Biographisches Lexikon zum Dritten Reich. Fischer-Taschenbuch-Verlag, Frankfurt am Main 2002, ISBN 3-596-13086-7.
- Zentner, Christian; Bedürftig, Friedemann (1997) [1991]. The Encyclopedia of the Third Reich. New York: Da Capo Press. ISBN 978-0-3068079-3-0.
