= Erwin Kraus =

German Nazi paramilitary official (1894–1966

- Kraus c. 1942–1945

Korpsführer of the National Socialist Motor Corps (NSKK)
- In office 23 June 1942 – 8 May 1945
- Preceded by: Adolf Huhnlein
- Succeeded by: Office abolished

Reichstag Deputy
- In office 29 March 1936 – 8 May 1945

Personal details
- Born: 26 May 1894 Karlsruhe, Grand Duchy of Baden, German Empire
- Died: 11 August 1966 (aged 72) Munich, Bavaria, Germany
- Party: Nazi Party
- Education: Karlsruhe Technische Hochschule
- Occupation: Transportation executive
- Profession: Mechanical engineer
- Civilian awards: Golden Party Badge

Military service
- Allegiance: German Empire
- Branch/service: Imperial German Army; Luftstreitkräfte; Grenzschutz Ost; Freikorps
- Years of service: 1914–1920
- Rank: Leutnant of reserves
- Unit: Reserve Infantry Regiment 235; Guards Cavalry Rifle Division; Eiserne Division
- Battles/wars: World War I Spartacist uprising First Silesian uprising
- Military awards: Iron Cross, 1st and 2nd class Wound Badge in black Aerial Observer Badge

Erwin Kraus (26 May 1894 – 11 August 1966) was a German engineer and motor transportation specialist who became a high-ranking Nazi Party official. He served as the Korpsführer of the National Socialist Motor Corps from June 1942 until Germany's May 1945 surrender in World War II. He was also a deputy in the German Reichstag from 1936 to 1945. As a result of denazification proceedings, he received a prison sentence and a fine. A later criminal investigation was dismissed for lack of evidence.

== Early life ==
Kraus was born in 1894 at Karlsruhe, and after obtaining his Abitur from the local Realgymnasium, studied mechanical engineering at the Karlsruhe Technische Hochschule (today, Karlsruhe Institute of Technology). From 1914 to 1918, he served in the Imperial German Army during World War I as a Leutnant of reserves with Reserve Infantry Regiment 235. After being severely wounded, he transferred to the Luftstreitkräfte, where he served until the end of the war, earning both classes of the Iron Cross, the Wound Badge and the Abzeichen für Beobachtungsoffiziere aus Flugzeugen (Aerial Observer Badge).

In the post-war period from 1919 to 1920, Kraus was a member of the Guards Cavalry Rifle Division and served as a pilot with the Grenzschutz Ost (Border Protection East). He participated in suppressing the Spartacist uprising and fought in the first of the Silesian uprisings against Polish insurgents. He also was a member of the air wing of the Eiserne Division (Iron Division), a Freikorps unit, operating against the Red Army during the Latvian War of Independence. After returning to civilian life, Kraus held executive positions in industry and the transport sector during the 1920s. From 1929 onward, he worked as an independent expert consultant for motor vehicles and machinery in Munich and Stuttgart.

== Nazi Party career ==
Kraus first became a member of the Nazi Party in 1923 before it was banned in the wake of the Beer Hall Putsch, and rejoined it on 1 June 1930 (membership number 247,608). As an early Party member, he was later awarded the Golden Party Badge. He also joined the National Socialist Motor Corps (NSKK) and served as a technical advisor to the NSKK and the motorized section of the Sturmabteilung (SA), both of which were Nazi Party paramilitary organizations. From 1930 to May 1933, Kraus led the Gruppenstaffel Südwest (Southwest Group Squadron), headquartered in Stuttgart. Subsequently, from May 1933 until the summer of 1935, he served as the head of the NSKK technical department and as Inspector of Motor Vehicles for the South. From 1935, he was the NSKK Inspector for Technical Training and Equipment. He served as the key technical advisor to Adolf Hühnlein, the NSKK-Korpsführer (corps leader), and attained the rank of NSKK-Obergruppenführer. From 1933 to 1942, he was also a member of the Supreme National Sports Authority for German Motor Sports and served as a delegate to international motor racing bodies.

From March 1936 until the fall of the Nazi regime in May 1945, Kraus served as a deputy in the Reichstag for electoral constituency 31 (Württemberg). Following Hühnlein's death, Kraus was appointed as the NSKK-Korpsführer on 23 June 1942 and held this office until May 1945. Though Kraus lacked significant political backing within the Party organization, he was an able technocrat as a recognized expert in the field of automotive technology. During the final phase of World War II, Adolf Hitler appointed him as the Inspector of Motor Engineering Training for the Volkssturm, the Nazi levée en masse militia.

== Post-war life ==
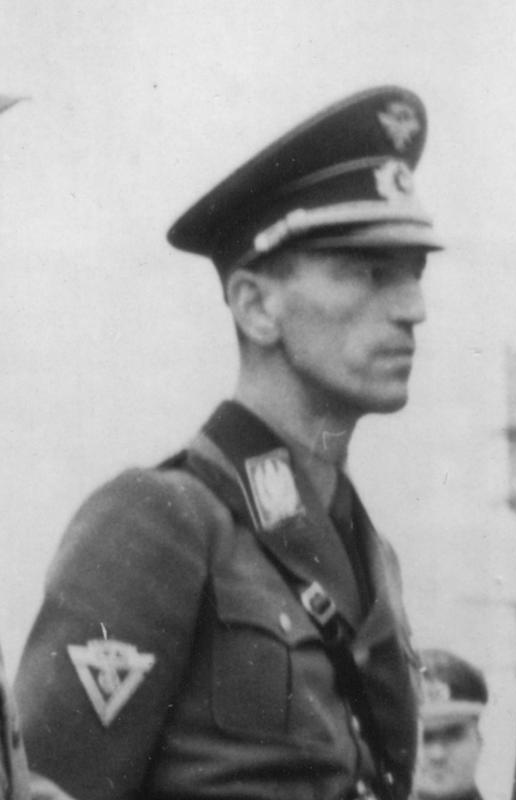
Kraus in August 1942

After Germany's surrender, Kraus was held in Allied internment in Garmisch-Partenkirchen. Following denazification proceedings before a tribunal in Nuremberg, he was classified as Category II (incriminated persons) in November 1948. He was sentenced to three-and-a-half-years in prison with credit for time served, and was ordered to pay a fine of 1,000 Deutsche Mark.

Kraus settled in Freiburg im Breisgau. In 1953, an investigation was launched into his alleged involvement in the murder of an NSKK member named Lukat, but it was not pursued due to insufficient evidence. Kraus died at Munich in August 1966.

== Sources ==
- Hochstetter, Dorothee (2005). Motorisierung und Volksgemeinschaft. Das Nationalsozialistische Kraftfahrkorps (NSKK) 1931–1945. Munich: Oldenbourg Verlag. ISBN 978-3-486-57570-5.
- Information about Erwin Kraus in the Reichstag database
- Kraus, Erwin in Traces of War
- Newspaper clippings about Erwin Kraus in the 20th Century Press Archives of the ZBW
- Stockhorst, Erich (1985). 5000 Köpfe: Wer War Was im 3. Reich. Kiel: Arndt Verlag. ISBN 978-3-887-41116-9.
