= Standartenführer =

Paramilitary officer's rank in Nazi Germany

- Country: Nazi Germany
- Service branch: Schutzstaffel; Sturmabteilung; National Socialist Motor Corps; National Socialist Flyers Corps
- Abbreviation: Staf.
- NATO rank code: OF-5
- Formation: 1925
- Abolished: 1945
- Next higher rank: Oberführer
- Next lower rank: Obersturmbannführer
- Equivalent ranks: Oberst (Colonel); Kapitän zur See

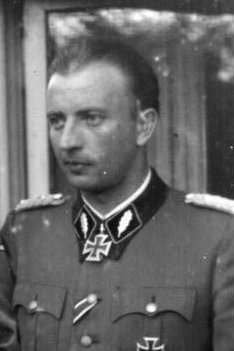
Hermann Fegelein as an SS-Standartenführer

Standartenführer (short: Staf, [ʃtanˈdaʁtn̩fyːʁɐ], lit. 'standard leader') was a Nazi Party (NSDAP) paramilitary rank that was used in several NSDAP organizations, such as the SA, SS, NSKK and the NSFK. First founded as a title in 1925, in 1928 it became one of the first commissioned NSDAP ranks and was bestowed upon those SA and SS officers who commanded a unit known as a Standarte (plural Standarten), a unit equivalent to an army battalion and comprising 300–500 personnel.

In 1929, the rank of Standartenführer was divided into two separate ranks known as Standartenführer (I) and Standartenführer (II). This concept was abandoned in 1930 when both the SA and SS expanded their rank systems to allow for more officer positions and thus the need for only a single Standartenführer rank. In 1933, when Adolf Hitler came to national power in Germany, the rank of Standartenführer had been established as the highest field officer rank, lower than that of Oberführer of the SS and SA. By the start of World War II, Standartenführer was widely spread as both an SS rank and a rank of the SA. In the Waffen-SS, the rank was considered the equivalent of an Oberst, a full colonel.

The insignia for Standartenführer consisted of a single oak leaf displayed on both collars. Standartenführer was the first of the SS and SA ranks to display rank insignia on both collars, without the display of unit insignia. From 1938, newer SS uniforms featured the shoulder boards of a German Army Oberst (colonel) in addition to the oak leaf collar patches.

Various Waffen-SS units composed of foreign recruits were considered distinct from the German SS, and thus they were not permitted to wear SS runes on their collar tabs but had their unit symbol instead. Their ranks was also prepended with "Waffen" instead of "SS", as in, Waffen-Standartenführer.

== Rank insignia ==
Standartenführer SS, SA, NSKK, and NSFK
Rank insignia: Shoulder insignia; Camo insignia; Gorget patch	Schutzstaffel (SS)		Sturmabteilung (SA)	NS Motor Corps (NSKK)	NS Flyers Corps (NSFK)
Rank insignia: Shoulder insignia; Camo insignia; Gorget patch	Waffen-SS	Allgemeine-SS; Waffen-SS	collar insignia		

Junior Rank; Obersturmbannführer	SS rank and SA rank Standartenführer	Senior Rank; Oberführer

== See also ==
- Table of ranks and insignia of the Waffen-SS
- Standarte (Nazi Germany)

== Bibliography ==
- Flaherty, T. H. (2004) [1988]. The Third Reich: The SS. Time-Life Books, Inc. ISBN 1-84447-073-3.
- McNab, Chris (2009). The SS: 1923–1945. Amber Books Ltd. ISBN 978-1-906626-49-5.
- McNab, Chris (2009b). The Third Reich. Amber Books Ltd. ISBN 978-1-906626-51-8.
- Stein, George (1984) [1966]. The Waffen-SS: Hitler's Elite Guard at War 1939–1945. Cornell University Press. ISBN 0-8014-9275-0.
- Wasser, Bruno: Himmlers Raumplanung im Osten, Basel, Berlin und Boston 1993, Seite 347, ISBN 3-7643-2852-5
- Yerger, Mark C. (1997). Allgemeine-SS: The Commands, Units and Leaders of the General SS. Schiffer Publishing. ISBN 0-7643-0145-4.
