= Korpsführer =

Nazi Party paramilitary rank

- Flyers Corps and Motor Corps gorget patch
- Country: Nazi Germany
- Service branch: National Socialist Flyers Corps; National Socialist Motor Corps
- Next higher rank: None
- Next lower rank: Obergruppenführer
- Equivalent ranks: Reichsführer-SS

Korpsführer ("Corps Leader") was a Nazi Party paramilitary rank that was held by the commander of the National Socialist Flyers Corps (NSFK) and National Socialist Motor Corps (NSKK). The rank was the equivalent of Reichsführer-SS, at least on paper.

== List of Korpsführers ==
=== NSFK ===
NSFK Korpsführer standard

No.	Portrait	Korpsführers for NSFK	Took office	Left office	Time in office	Ref.
1	Friedrich Christiansen	Friedrich Christiansen (1879–1972)	5 April 1937	26 June 1943	6 years, 82 days	
2	Alfred Keller	Alfred Keller (1882–1974)	26 June 1943	8 May 1945	1 year, 313 days	–

=== NSKK ===
NSKK Korpsführer standard

No.	Portrait	Korpsführers for NSKK	Took office	Left office	Time in office	Ref.
1	Adolf Hühnlein	Adolf Hühnlein (1881–1942)	30 April 1933	18 June 1942 †	9 years, 49 days	
2	Erwin Kraus	Erwin Kraus (1894–1966)	21 June 1942	8 May 1945	2 years, 318 days	–
