= National Socialist Motor Corps =

Nazi Party paramilitary organization

- Nationalsozialistisches Kraftfahrkorps

Agency overview
- Formed: May 1931 (Independent of SA, September 1934)
- Dissolved: 8 May 1945
- Superseding agency: National Socialist Automobile Corps (NSAK)
- Type: Paramilitary
- Jurisdiction: Germany
- Agency executives: Adolf Hühnlein (1931–1942), Korpsführer; Erwin Kraus (1942–1945), Korpsführer; Adolf Ritter von Denk, Stabsführer
- Parent agency: Nazi Party (NSDAP)

NSKK standard

The National Socialist Motor Corps (German: Nationalsozialistisches Kraftfahrkorps, NSKK) was a paramilitary organization of the Nazi Party (NSDAP) that officially existed from May 1931 to May 1945. The group was a successor organisation to the older National Socialist Automobile Corps (German: Nationalsozialistisches Automobilkorps, NSAK), which had existed since April 1930.

The NSKK served as a training organization, mainly instructing members in the operation and maintenance of high-performance motorcycles and automobiles. The NSKK was further used to transport NSDAP and SA members, and also served as a roadside assistance group in the mid-1930s. The outbreak of World War II in Europe led to recruitment among NSKK ranks to serve in the transport corps of various German military branches. A French section of the NSKK was also organised after the German occupation of France began in 1940. The NSKK was the smallest of the Nazi Party organizations.

== History ==
The National Socialist Motor Corps (NSKK) was a successor organization to the older National Socialist Automobile Corps (NSAK), which had been formed on 1 April 1930. Legends about the actual emergence of the NSKK go back as far as 1922, when Dietrich Eckart, Völkischer Beobachter publisher and founding member of the German Workers' Party (DAP), allegedly purchased trucks so the Sturmabteilung (SA) could perform their missions and transport propaganda materials. Martin Bormann founded the NSAK, itself the successor to the SA Motor Squadrons (Kraftfahrstaffeln). Hitler made the NSAK an official Nazi organization on 1 April 1930. The NSAK was responsible for coordinating the use of donated motor vehicles belonging to party members, and later expanded to training members in automotive skills. Adolf Hühnlein was appointed Korpsführer (Corps Leader) of the NSAK, which was to serve primarily as a motorized corps of the SA. Hühnlein became the organization's "nucleus".

The organization's name was changed to the National Socialist Motor Corps (Nationalsozialistisches Kraftfahrkorps; NSKK), and it was officially formed on 1 May 1931. It was essentially a paramilitary organization with its own system of paramilitary ranks and the smallest of the NSDAP organizations. Yet despite its relatively small size, when the Nazis staged a large SA rally in Braunschweig on 18 October 1931, the NSKK had upwards of 5,000 vehicles at its disposal to move men and materials.

The primary aim of the NSKK was to teach its members in motoring skills, or "fitness in motoring skills" (Motorische Ertüchtigung), but it also transported NSDAP and SA officials. In the mid-1930s, the NSKK also served as a roadside assistance group, comparable to the modern-day American Automobile Association or the British Automobile Association.

Membership in the NSKK did not require any prior automotive knowledge; training in the organization was to make up for any lack of knowledge. However, the NSKK adhered to Nazi racial doctrine and screened its members for Aryan traits. Under the guidance of the police, numerous NSKK men were stationed at traffic junctions and trained in traffic control.

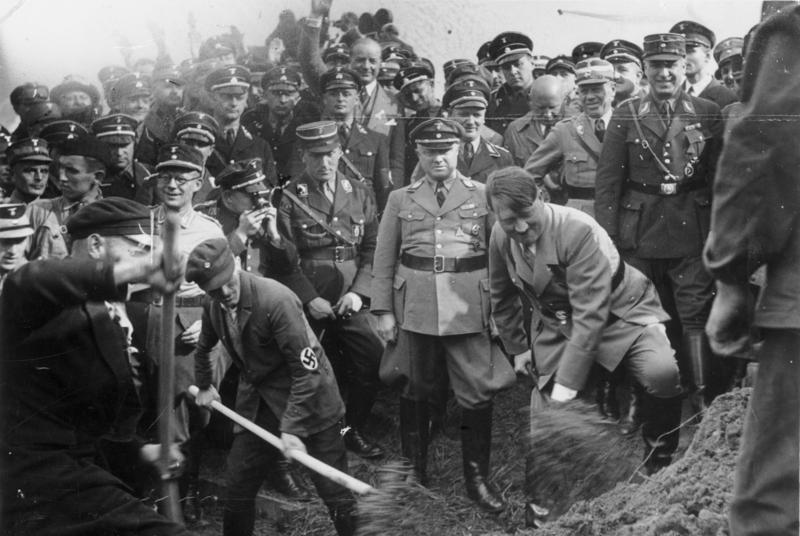
Adolf Hühnlein (on the right side behind Hitler) 1933 at the ground-breaking ceremony of the Reichsautobahn

On 2 September 1934, weeks after the major purge of the SA during the Night of the Long Knives, the NSKK was separated from it and granted the status of an independent NSDAP organization, with Hühnlein still at its head. His Stabsführer (staff leader) was Adolf Ritter von Denk.

From 1935 onward, the NSKK also provided training for Panzer crews and drivers of the Heer (German Army). The NSKK had two sub-branches, the Motor-Hitler Youth (Motor-Hitlerjugend; Motor-HJ) and Naval NSKK (Marine-NSKK). The Motor-HJ branch, formed by Reichsjugendführer (Hitler Youth Leader) Baldur von Schirach after he became an NSKK member, operated 350 of its own vehicles for educational and training purposes. The Naval NSKK provided training in boat operation and maintenance.

During the 1936 Summer Olympics in Berlin, the NSKK assumed responsibility for a variety of transport tasks, proving themselves effective at political propaganda by taking foreign visitors on designated tours. By 1938, NSKK members were undergoing mechanical and operational training for both civilian and military vehicles. Over time, training at NSKK schools became primarily focused on military related tasks. For his NSKK service and due in part to the general success of the organization, Hühnlein was promoted NSDAP Reichsleiter in 1938. He remained NSKK Korpsführer until his death in June 1942, and was succeeded by Erwin Kraus.

=== Affiliation with other Nazi organizations and the Second World War ===
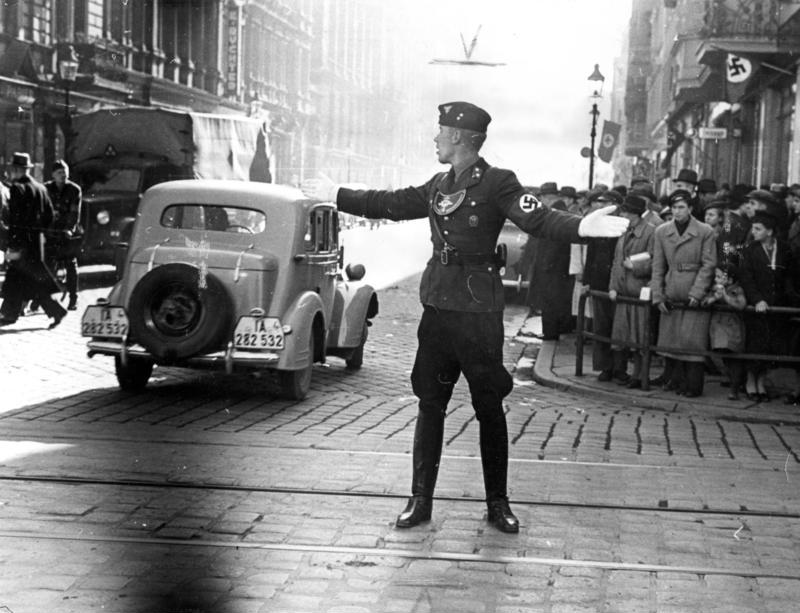
An NSKK member directs traffic in Poznań, Occupied Poland, October 1939

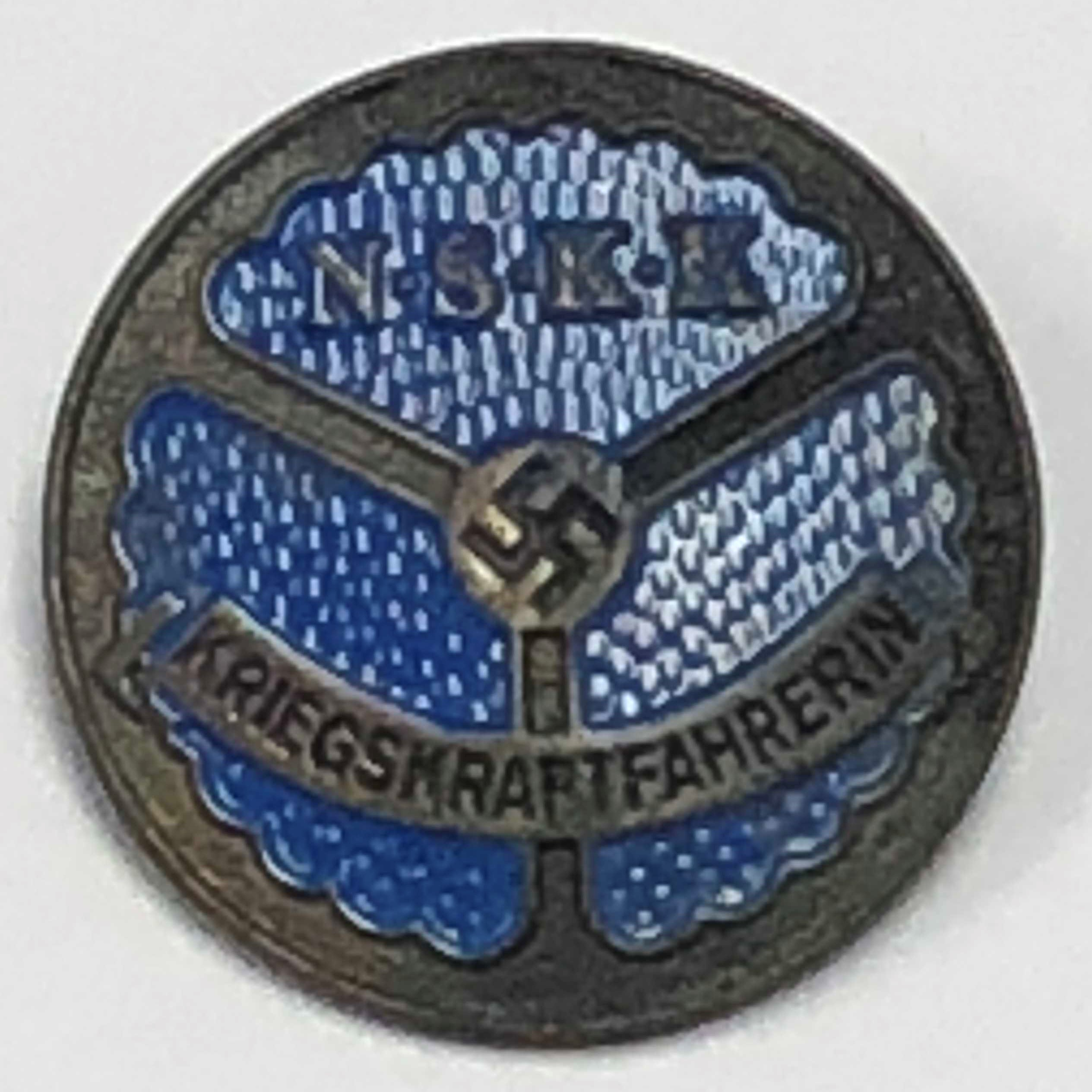
NSKK Female Driver's Badge

Sometime in August 1938, the NSKK began courier services for Organization Todt (OT) during construction of the Siegfried defensive line. Members of the NSKK transported classified documents, important reports and announcements, construction plans, and routine papers to and from the organization's headquarters. Exemplary service provided to the organization resulted in Hühnlein being given oversight for the transportation needs related to the task. Over 15,000 trucks went into operation, delivering building materials to the 22,000 individual construction sites of the Siegfried Line. Every day, over 5,000 buses were used to transport 200,000 workers to construction sites.

At the time, the NSKK was also used by Hitler's chief architect, Albert Speer, who founded a unit known as the Transportbrigade Speer; it primarily provided support to Organization Todt air base construction and was organized under military considerations, divided into regiments, divisions, companies and platoons. On 27 January 1939, Hitler made the NSKK the sole authority for motor-vehicle related military training. Shortly thereafter, it was divided into five main groups and 23 subordinate motor groups. NSKK manpower reached nearly half a million men, its leadership operating primarily out of Munich and Berlin.

With the outbreak of World War II on 1 September 1939, the National Socialist Motor Corps became a target for army recruitment, since NSKK member knowledge of motorized transport was a coveted skill at a time when the bulk of German ground forces relied on horses. The NSKK was used to transport German army troops, supplies and ammunition. By the outbreak of the war, the NSKK had already trained approximately 200,000 men at its 21 training facilities.

During field operations on the Eastern Front, NSKK members of the Speer Transport Brigade followed Army Group South, providing infrastructure support and replenishment. Brigade members wore either the Luftwaffe gray-blue uniform or the brown uniform of Speer's staff. NSKK personnel working for Organization Todt became members of Transportbrigade Todt, which was further divided into individual motor groups in the occupied territories.

Major units of the NSKK were formed by 1944, operating throughout Germany. There were two full brigades of the NSKK supporting the Luftwaffe; a Motorobergruppe Alpenland in the Austrian Alps; Motorobergruppe Mitte (middle) which operated in Berlin, Franconia, and the Lower Rhine; Motorobergruppe Nord (north) that covered Hamburg, Lower Saxony, the Baltic Sea and Schleswig-Holstein; Motorobergruppe Nordost (northeast) in Danzig, East Prussia, and Wartheland; Motorobergruppe Ost (east) for Leipzig, Lower and Upper Silesia; Motorobergruppe Süd (south) which served Bavaria and Hochland; Motorobergruppe Südwest (southwest) for the Rhine-Moselle, and Swabian regions; Motorobergruppe Südost (southeast) covering the Upper and Lower Danube, Sudetenland; and Motorobergruppe West (west), which was responsible for Hessen, Thuringia, and Westphalia. Moreover, there were also NSKK units assigned to Organization Todt, operating in France, Italy and Russia. Historian Peter Longerich suggests that NSKK members, along with paramilitary police, the Waffen-SS, and the German Army were all culpable in varying degrees for large-scale arrests, torture, and mass executions during the war.

=== French NSKK ===
The French section of the NSKK began shortly after the German occupation of France in 1940, though the section was not officially recognized until July 1942. The main office was in Paris, but recruitment took place across France. By the end of 1942, the section consisted of one company of 200 men; by the end of the war, seven companies had been raised. The men had to sign up for two years of service. The French NSKK was originally attached to the Luftwaffe, although members wore the standard NSKK uniforms and used its rank system. Members wore their own arm badge with the colors of the French flag. The first version had "NSKK" in black letters across the top of the shield; the second bore the word "France" in black letters across the top of the shield.

The original unit was officially known as NSKK Gruppe Luftwaffe and a second one was known as NSKK Transportgruppe Todt. At Melun, the NSKK had its own driving school for French recruits and those from other European countries. Before the Schutzstaffel (SS) began openly recruiting members into the Waffen-SS, Frenchmen used the NSKK as a "back door" to get into the Waffen-SS to fight on the Eastern Front against the Soviet Union. Some French NSKK men were sent to the Eastern Front in a group known as NSKK Einsatzgruppe Russland.

In September 1944, the Waffen-Grenadier-Brigade der SS "Charlemagne" was formed from the Legion of French Volunteers Against Bolshevism (LVF) and the SS Volunteer Sturmbrigade France. Joining them were French collaborators fleeing the Allied advance in the west, as well as Frenchmen from the German Navy, the NSKK, the Organisation Todt and the detested Milice security police. In February 1945, the Waffen-Grenadier-Brigade der SS "Charlemagne" was officially upgraded to a division and became known as the 33rd Waffen Grenadier Division of the SS Charlemagne (1st French).

== End of the NSKK ==
The NSKK was disbanded in May 1945 and declared a "condemned organization" at the Nuremberg Trials (though not a criminal one), due in part to the NSKK's origins in the SA and its racial membership requirements.

== See also ==
- Ranks and insignia of the National Socialist Motor Corps
- Paul Nieder-Westermann
