= Ranks and insignia of Organisation Todt =

Ranks and insignia of Organisation Todt show the pay grades, wage groups, and paramilitary ranks used by Organisation Todt.

== Ranks and pay grades of OT organic staff ==
OT-pay grade	Technical services and transport	Administrative and executive	Medical	Equivalent rank
16	OT-Arbeiter	OT-Arbeiter	OT-Sanitäter	Grenadier
15	OT-Stammarbeiter	-	-	Obergrenadier
14	OT-Vorarbeiter	OT-Vorarbeiter	OT-Stammsanitäter	Gefreiter
13	OT-Meister	OT-Meister	OT-Obersanitäter	Obergefreiter
12	OT-Obermeister	OT-Obermeister	OT-Hauptsanitäter	Unteroffizier
12	OT-Truppführer	OT-Truppführer	OT-Sanitätstruppführer	Feldwebel
11	OT-Obertruppführer	OT-Obertruppführer	OT-Sanitätsobertruppfüher	Oberfeldwebel
11	OT-Haupttruppführer	OT-Haupttruppführer	OT-Sanitätshaupttruppführer	Stabsfeldwebel
10	OT-Bauführer	OT-Frontführer	OT-Arzt	Leutnant
9	OT-Oberbauführer	OT-Oberfrontführer	OT-Oberarzt	Oberleutnant
8	OT-Hauptbauführer	OT-Hauptfrontführer	OT-Stabsarzt	Hauptmann
7	OT-Bauleiter	OT-Stabsfrontführer	OT-Oberstabsarzt	Major
6	OT-Oberbauleiter	OT-Oberstabsfrontführer	OT-Oberfeldarzt	Oberstleutnant
5	OT-Hauptbauleiter	OT-Oberstfrontführer	OT-Oberstarzt	Oberst
4	OT-Einsatzleiter	OT-Einsatzleiter	-	Generalmajor
3	OT-Einsatz-gruppenleiter II	-	-	Generalleutnant
2	OT-Einsatz-gruppenleiter I	-	-	General
1	Amtschef Organisation Todt	-	-	Generaloberst

== Ranks and wage groups of OT contractor staff ==
Wage group	OT-rank	Specifications
J1	OT-Arbeiter; OT-Stammarbeiter; OT-Vorarbeiter	Technical and clerical employees under 20 years of age, without completed vocational education
J2	OT-Stammarbeiter; OT-Vorarbeiter; OT-Meister	Technical and clerical employees under 20 years of age, with completed vocational education and apprenticeship
K1	OT-Vorarbeiter; OT-Meister; OT-Obermeister	Clerical employees with repetitive tasks
K2	OT-Vorarbeiter; OT-Meister; OT-Obermeister	Clerical employees with simple tasks
T1	OT-Vorarbeiter; OT-Meister; OT-Obermeister	Technical employees with repetitive tasks
T2	OT-Obermeister; OT-Truppführer	Technical employees with simple tasks
M	OT-Obermeister; OT-Truppführer; OT-Obertruppführer	Foremen
MO	OT-Truppführer; OT-Obertruppführer; OT-Haupttruppführer	Head foremen
K3	OT-Obertruppführer; OT-Haupttruppführer; OT-Frontführer	Administrative employees
T3	OT-Haupttruppführer; OT-Bauführer	Technical employees with difficult tasks
K4	OT-Frontführer; OT-Oberfrontführer; OT-Hauptfrontführer	Leading administrative employees
T4	OT-Oberbauführer; OT-Hauptbauführer; OT-Bauleiter	Leading technical employees
TH	OT-Hauptbauführer; OT-Bauleiter; OT-Oberbauleiter	Executives

== Wage groups for front workers and OT legionaries ==
Wage Group	Category
A	Assistant foremen
B	Leading skilled workers
C	Skilled specialists
D	Skilled workers Leading semi-skilled workers
E	Semi-skilled workers Leading unskilled workers
F	Unskilled workers
G	Guard workers
H	Catering and service workers
J	Workers under the age of 18
K	Female workers

== Rank insignia ==
Collar insignia	Shoulder insignia	OT rank	Translation	Heer equivalent
		Amtschef Organisation Todt	Head of office Organization Todt	Generaloberst
		OT-Einsatz-gruppenleiter I	OT-Operations group leader I	General
		OT-Einsatz-gruppenleiter II	OT-Operations group leader II	Generalleutnant
		OT-Einsatzleiter	OT-Operations manager	Generalmajor
		OT-Hauptbauleiter	OT-Main site manager	Oberst
		OT-Oberbauleiter	OT-Chief site manager	Oberstleutnant
		OT-Bauleiter	OT-Site manager	Major
		OT-Hauptbauführer	OT-Main construction guide	Hauptmann
		OT-Oberbauführer	OT-Superintendent	Oberleutnant
		OT-Bauführer	OT-Construction guide	Leutnant
		OT-Haupttruppführer	OT-Main squad leader	No equivalent
		OT-Obertruppführer	OT-Senior troop leader	Stabsfeldwebel
		OT-Truppführer	OT-Squad leader	Hauptfeldwebel
		OT-Obermeister	OT-Senior master	Unteroffizier
		OT-Meister	OT-Master	Obergefreiter
		OT-Vorarbeiter	OT-Foreman	Gefreiter
		OT-Stammarbeiter	OT-Permanent worker	Soldat
		OT-Arbeiter	OT-Worker	Soldat
