= Ranks and insignia of the German Red Cross =

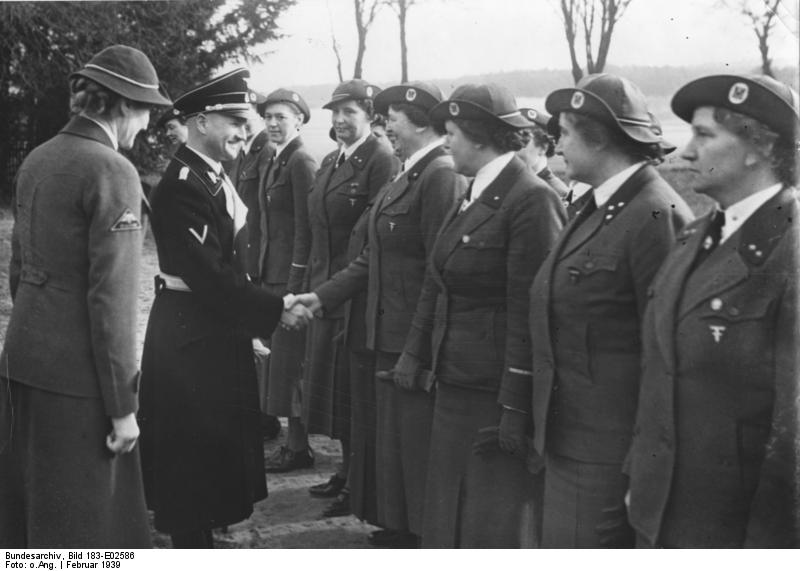
Nurses of the German Red Cross (Deutsches Rotes Kreuz, DRK) wearing paramilitary uniforms at a leadership school in 1939

The ranks and insignia of the German Red Cross (Deutsches Rotes Kreuz, abbr. DRK) were the paramilitary rank system used by the German Red Cross during World War II.

== Insignia ==
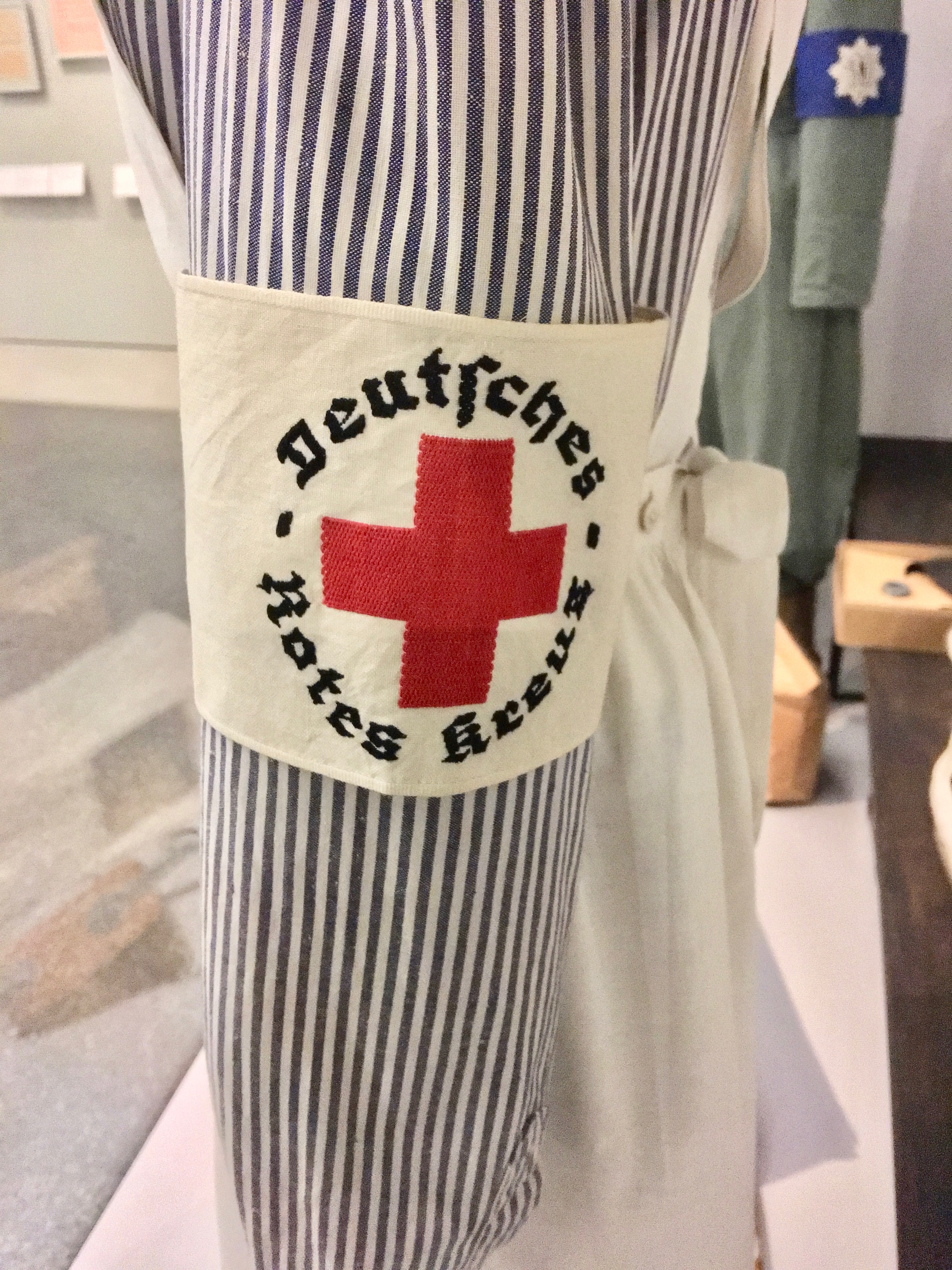
Armband of the DRK as part of a nurse's clothing

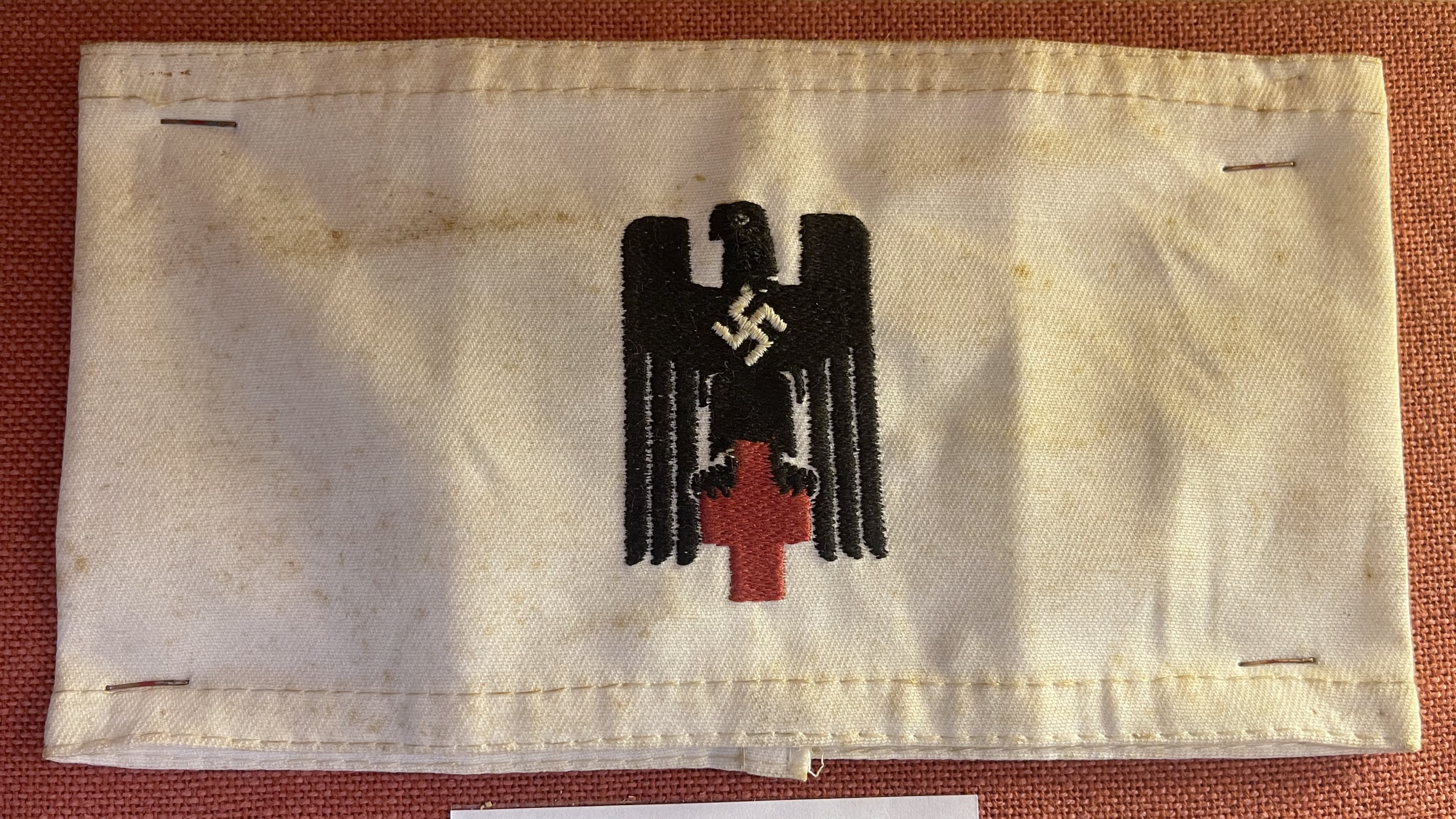
Armband with the DRK version of the "eagle-and-swastika"

Men's uniforms and insignia of the German Red Cross (Deutsches Rotes Kreuz, DRK) during the Nazi era would include helmets with special decals with the Red Cross eagle. Likewise, belt buckles were also issued with the same eagle.

== Rank insignia ==
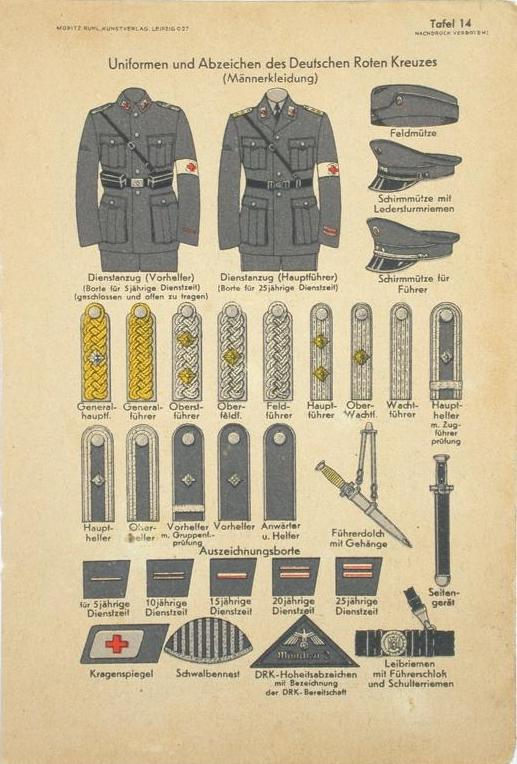
Uniforms and rank insignia of male members of the German Red Cross during World War II. Book plate from Deutsche Uniformen ("German Uniforms") published around 1942

Shoulder insignia	Name	Translation	Heer equivalent
	Generalhauptführer	General chief leader	Generalleutnant
	Generalführer	General leader	Generalmajor
	Oberstführer	Colonel leader	Oberst
	Oberfeldführer	Senior field leader	Oberstleutnant
	Feldführer	Field leader	Major
	Hauptführer	Chief leader	Hauptmann
	Oberwachführer	Senior watch leader	Oberleutnant
	Wachführer	Watch leader	Leutnant
Enlisted
	Haupthelfer mit Zugführer Prüfung	Head helper with platoon exam	Stabsfeldwebel
	Haupthelfer	Head helper	Oberfeldwebel
	Oberhelfer	Senior helper	Feldwebel
	Vorhelfer mit Gruppenführer Prüfung	Front helper with group leader exam	Unterfeldwebel
	Vorhelfer	Front helper	Unteroffizier
	Helfer	Helper	Gefreiter
	Anwärter	Candidate	Soldat

=== Nurse ranks ===
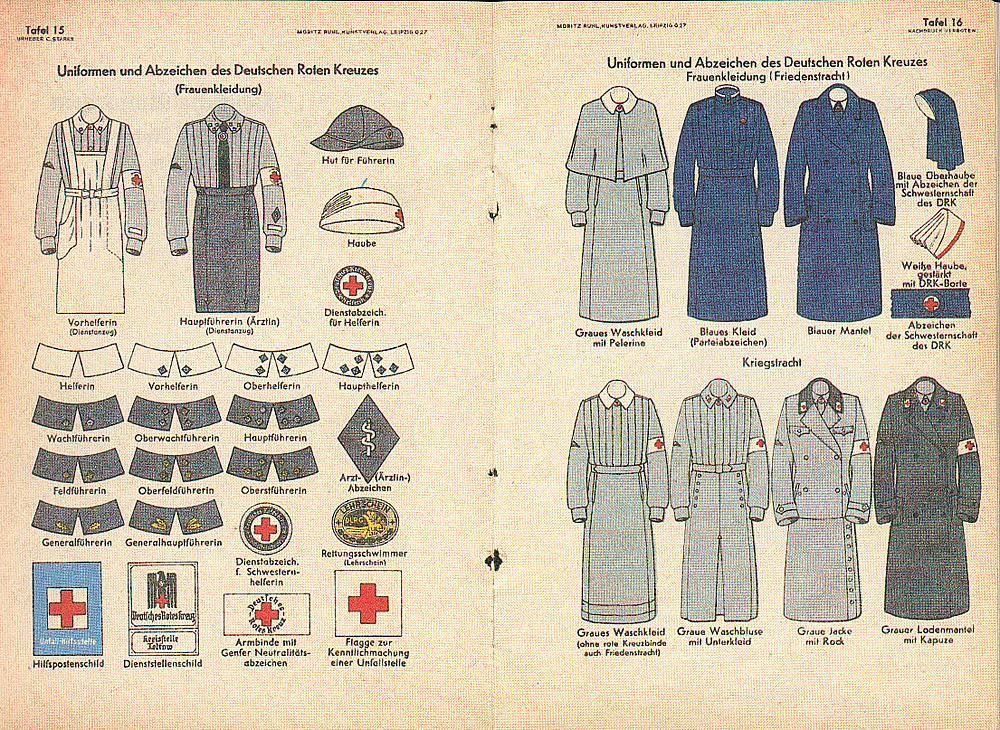
Uniforms and rank insignia of female members and nurses of the German Red Cross during World War II. Book plates from Deutsche Uniformen c. 1942

Collar insignia	Name	Translation	Heer equivalent
	Generalhauptführerin	General chief leader	Generalleutnant
	Generalführerin	General leader	Generalmajor
	Oberstführerin	Colonel leader	Oberst
	Oberfeldführerin	Senior field leader	Oberstleutnant
	Feldführerin	Field leader	Major
	Hauptführerin	Chief leader	Hauptmann
	Oberwachführerin	Senior latch leader	Oberleutnant
	Wachführerin	Watch leader	Leutnant
	Haupthelferin	Head helper	Oberfeldwebel
	Oberhelferin	Senior helper	Feldwebel
	Vorhelferin	Front helper	Unteroffizier
	Anwärter	Candidate	Soldat

== See also ==
- Comparative ranks of Nazi Germany
