= Nazi Germany paramilitary ranks =

Pseudo-military titles used by the Nazis

National Socialist paramilitary ranks were pseudo-military titles, which were used by the Nazi Party (Nationalsozialistische Deutsche Arbeiterpartei; NSDAP), between 1920 and 1945. Since the Nazi Party was by its very nature a paramilitary organisation, by the time of World War II, several systems of paramilitary ranks had come into existence for both the Nazi Party itself and various Nazi paramilitary organisations.

The various paramilitary rank systems used by the Nazi Party included:

- Ranks and insignia of the Hitler Youth
- Ranks and insignia of the National Socialist Motor Corps
- Ranks and insignia of the Nazi Party
- Uniforms and insignia of the Schutzstaffel
- Uniforms and insignia of the Sturmabteilung
- Ranks and insignia of the Volkssturm
- Ranks and insignia of the Waffen-SS

After the Nazi Party came to power in Germany, a number of Nazi state controlled and/or sponsored organisations developed Nazi style ranks, insignia, and titles. Such various ranks and insignia included:

- Ranks and insignia of the Ordnungspolizei
- Ranks and insignia of Organisation Todt
- Ranks and insignia of the Reichsarbeitsdienst
- Ranks and insignia of the Reichsluftschutzbund
- Ranks and insignia of the Reichsbahn

The Nazi use of paramilitary ranks even extended as far as inmates of concentration camps. By 1936, a system of Nazi concentration camp badges had been developed along paramilitary lines.

== See also ==
- Comparative ranks of Nazi Germany
