= Untersturmführer =

Nazi SS rank

- SS collar patches
- Country: Nazi Germany
- Service branch: Schutzstaffel
- Abbreviation: Ustuf
- NATO rank code: OF-1
- Formation: 1934
- Abolished: 1945
- Next higher rank: Obersturmführer
- Next lower rank: Hauptscharführer (Allgemeine SS); Sturmscharführer (Waffen-SS)
- Equivalent ranks: Leutnant

SS-Untersturmführer

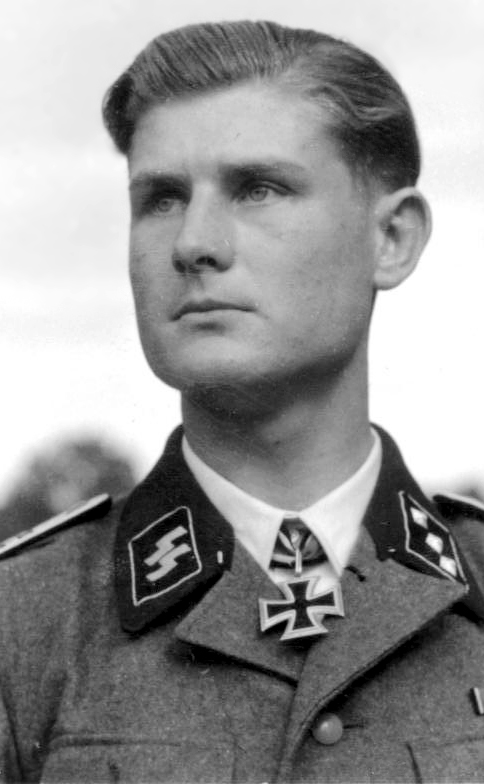
Werner Wolff, SS-Untersturmführer of the Waffen-SS

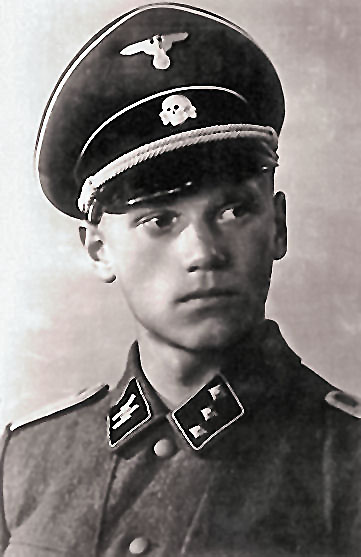
Törni in a Waffen-SS uniform during training in 1941

Untersturmführer (German: [ˈʊntɐʃtʊʁmˌfyːʁɐ], lit. 'Junior storm leader'; short: Ustuf) was a paramilitary rank of the German Schutzstaffel (SS) first created in July 1934. The rank can trace its origins to the older SA rank of Sturmführer, which had existed since the founding of the SA in 1921. The rank of Untersturmführer was senior to Hauptscharführer (or Sturmscharführer in the Waffen-SS) and junior to the rank of Obersturmführer.

== Overview ==
Untersturmführer was the first commissioned SS officer rank, equivalent to a second lieutenant in other military organizations. The insignia consisted of a three silver pip collar patch with the shoulder boards of an army lieutenant. Because of the emphasis the SS placed on the leadership of their organization, obtaining the rank of Untersturmführer required a screening and training process different from the standard promotion system in the enlisted ranks.

In the early days of the SS, promotion to Untersturmführer was simply a matter of course as an SS member rose within the enlisted ranks to a position where they were ready to assume the duties of an officer. Untersturmführer was also occasionally an appointed position, given to an SS member so that they would be able to immediately begin as an officer in the organization. This was typically the case in security organizations, such as the Gestapo and Sicherheitsdienst (SD). A typical scenario in the early SS was for a member to join as an SS-Mann and then receive promotion directly to Sturmführer. In some cases, where an officer was being "groomed" to take up an SS leadership position, an officer could be promoted even higher. Such was the situation with Friedrich Jeckeln who was promoted directly from Mann to Sturmbannführer.

By 1938, the size and logistics of the SS brought about the need for an established system of becoming an SS officer with this system different for both the Waffen-SS and the general SS formations of the Allgemeine-SS.

== Rank insignia ==
Untersturmführer SS and NSFK				Sturmführer SA and NSKK
Rank insignia: Shoulder insignia; Camo insignia; Collar patch	Schutzstaffel (SS)		NS Flyers Corps (NSFK)	Sturmabteilung (SA)	NS Motor Corps (NSKK)
Rank insignia: Shoulder insignia; Camo insignia; Collar patch	Waffen-SS	Allgemeine-SS; Waffen-SS	collar insignia

Sequence of ranks in comparison with Wehrmacht (Heer)
Allgemeine SS/Waffen-SS; SS-Hauptscharführer	junior rank Waffen SS only SS-Sturmscharführer	Rank SS; Untersturmführer	senior rank SS-Obersturmführer
SA-Haupttruppführer		Rank SA; Sturmführer	SA-Obersturmführer
Oberfeldwebel (OR-7)	Stabsfeldwebel (OR-8)	Wehrmacht rank Leutnant (OF-1b)	Oberleutnant (OF-1a)

== General-SS commissions ==
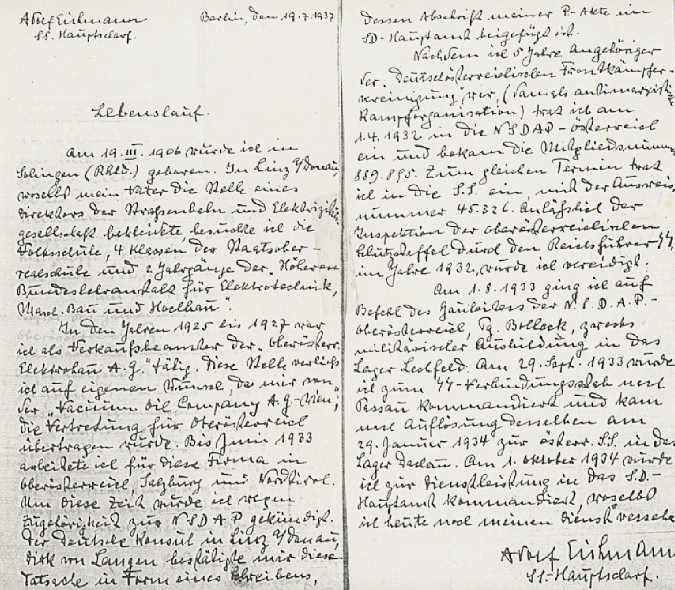
Adolf Eichmann's Lebenslauf for his application for promotion from SS-Hauptscharführer to SS-Untersturmführer in 1937

Within the Allgemeine, or "General" SS, promotion to the rank of Untersturmführer required satisfactory service in the enlisted SS ranks with an SS member holding the rank of Hauptscharführer before consideration could be given for an officer's commission. Those so eligible were required to obtain a recommendation from their SS chain of command followed by submission of a document known as the Lebenslauf. A résumé of the SS member's career, the Lebenslauf stated why the SS member felt they should be commissioned as an officer and gave, as evidence, a list of chronological accomplishments both within the SS and before joining.

Following a racial and political background check, the SS member's service record would be reviewed, with the Lebenslauf and all SS evaluations screened by the SS personnel office (known as the SS Personalhauptamt). If found eligible for promotion, the potential SS officer's name would be forwarded to Heinrich Himmler for final approval of commission.

Between 1934 and 1938, Himmler personally reviewed all candidates for promotion to the rank of Untersturmführer. However, during the Second World War, manpower constraints and logistics prevented Himmler from screening all SS officer applicants and the task typically fell to subordinates.

== Waffen-SS commissions ==
Becoming an officer in the Waffen-SS could be a difficult and time-consuming process. All candidates for commissions in the Waffen-SS were required to attend SS-Junkerschulen (SS-Junker Schools), which were training camps established to train future Waffen-SS officers. The most well known of these academies was located at Bad Tölz, Bavaria.

To be admitted into an SS Junkerschule a prospective officer must have served in the enlisted ranks of the Waffen-SS and must have been recommended for a commission by his superiors.

== Field commissions ==
As World War II drew to a close, and losses within the armed forces began to rise, the strictness of admission to the SS officer corps began to grow lax. By 1945, it was a common occurrence for local Waffen-SS field commanders to grant promotions to the rank of Untersturmführer when battlefield manpower needs required it. Within the Allgemeine-SS, in particular the security forces of the RSHA, promotions to Untersturmführer still required careful scrutiny and there were SS members awaiting approval of commissions as late as April 1945.

== See also ==
- Table of ranks and insignia of the Waffen-SS

== Bibliography ==
- Flaherty, T. H. (2004) [1988]. The Third Reich: The SS. Time-Life Books, Inc. ISBN 1-84447-073-3.
- McNab, Chris (2009). The SS: 1923–1945. Amber Books Ltd. ISBN 978-1-906626-49-5.
- Stein, George (2002) [1966]. The Waffen-SS: Hitler's Elite Guard at War 1939–1945. Cerberus Publishing Ltd. ISBN 978-1841451008.
