= Ranks and insignia of the Reichsarbeitsdienst =

Paramilitary ranks in Nazi Germany

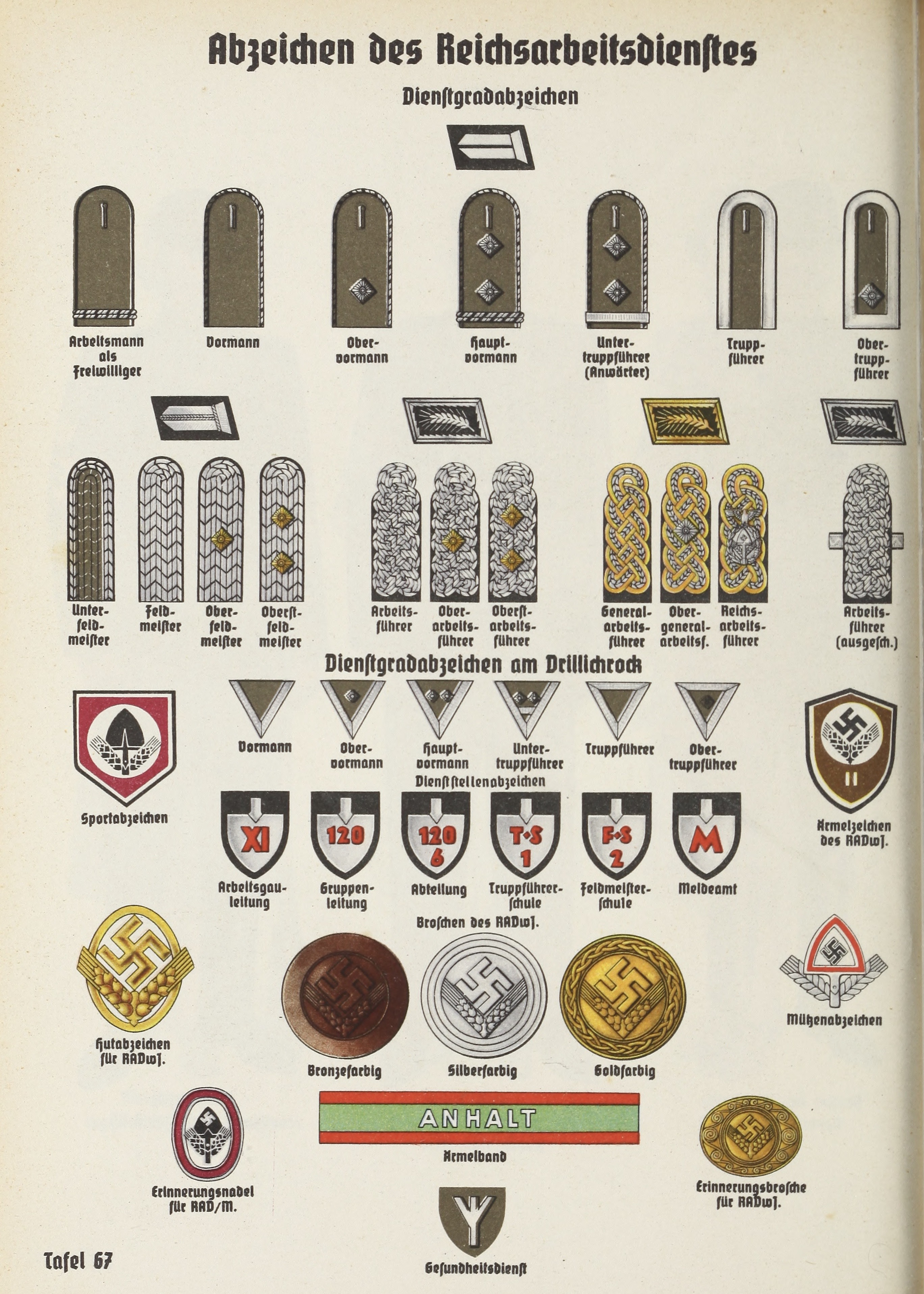
RAD rank insignia etc. in the Nazi Party handbook Organisationsbuch der NSDAP, 1943

Ranks and insignia of the Reichsarbeitsdienst were paramilitary ranks used by the Reich Labour Service of Nazi Germany.

== Rank structure ==
Troop ranks	Administrative ranks	Medical officers ranks	Female ranks	Equivalent Wehrmacht rank
Reichsarbeitsführer	-	-	-	Generalfeldmarschall
Generaloberstfeldmeister (1945)	-	-	-	Generaloberst
Generalfeldmeister (1945)	-	-	-	General der Waffengattung
Obergeneralarbeitsführer	-	-	-	Generalleutnant
Generalarbeitsführer		Generalarbeitsarzt	-	Generalmajor
Oberstarbeitsführer	Oberstamtswalter	Oberstarbeitsarzt	Maidenhauptstabsführerin	Oberst
Oberarbeitsführer	Oberstabsamtswalter	Oberarbeitsarzt	Maidenoberstabsführerin	Oberstleutnant
Arbeitsführer	Stabsamtswalter	Arbeitsarzt	Maidenstabsführerin	Major
Oberstfeldmeister	Hauptamtswalter	Arbeitsfeldarzt	Maidenhauptführerin	Hauptmann
Oberfeldmeister	Oberamtswalter	Arbeitslagerarzt	Maidenoberführerin	Oberleutnant
Feldmeister	Amtswalter	-	Maidenführerin	Leutnant
Unterfeldmeister	-	-	Maidenunterführerin	Stabsfeldwebel
Haupttruppführer (1944)	-	-	-	Oberfeldwebel
Obertruppführer		-	Jungführerin	Feldwebel
Truppführer		-	Kameradschaftsführerin	Unteroffizier
Untertruppführer	-	-	-	Unteroffiziersanwärter
Hauptvormann	-	-	-	Stabsgefreiter
Obervormann	-	-	-	Obergefreiter
Vormann	-	-	-	Gefreiter
Arbeitsmann	-	-	Arbeitsmaid	Schütze

== Rank insignia 1943-1945 ==
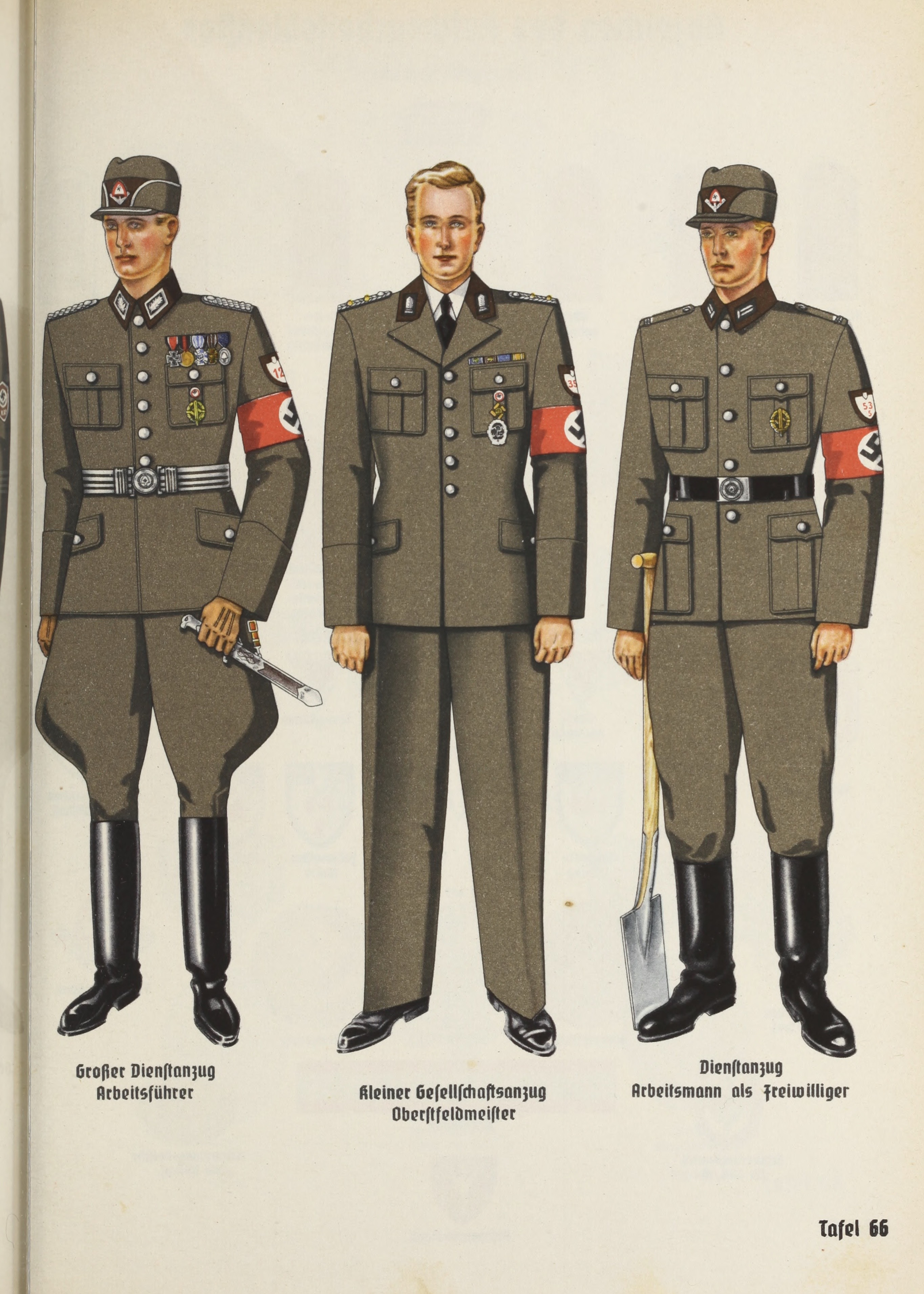
Uniforms for Arbeitsführer, Oberfeldmeister, and Arbeitsmann of the RAD. Plate from Organisationsbuch der NSDAP, 1943

Collar insignia	Shoulder insignia	Chevrons (used in 1940)	RAD rank	Translation	Heer equivalent
			Reichsarbeitsführer	Reich labour leader	Generalfeldmarschall
			Generaloberstfeldmeister	Colonel general field master	Generaloberst
			Generalfeldmeister	General field master	General der Waffengattung
			Obergeneralarbeitsführer	Senior general labour leader	Generalleutnant
			Generalarbeitsführer	General labour leader	Generalmajor
			Oberstarbeitsführer	Colonel labour leader	Oberst
			Oberarbeitsführer	Senior labour leader	Oberstleutnant
			Arbeitsführer	Labour leader	Major
			Oberstfeldmeister	Colonel field master	Hauptmann
			Oberfeldmeister	Senior field master	Oberleutnant
			Feldmeister	Field master	Leutnant
			Unterfeldmeister	Junior field master	Hauptfeldwebel
			Obertruppführer	Senior troop leader	Feldwebel
			Truppführer	Troop leader	Unteroffizier
			Untertruppführer	Junior troop leader	Unteroffiziersanwärter
			Hauptvormann	Head foreman	Stabsgefreiter
			Obervormann	Senior foreman	Obergefreiter
			Vormann	Foreman	Gefreiter
			Arbeitsmann	Working man	Soldat

== Pay of Stammpersonal ==
Male - rank	Male - paygrade	Male - annual salary Reichsmark (RM)	Number of regular positions 1939	Female - rank	Female - paygrade	Female - annual salary (RM)	Wehrmacht equivalent
Reichsarbeitsführer	RADm 1	24 000	1				OF-10
Obergeneralarbeitsführer	RADm 2	18 000	1				OF-7
Generalarbeitsführer	RADm 3	14 000	19				OF-6
Oberstarbeitsführer	RADm 4	8400-12600	48	Maidenhauptstabsführerin	RADw 1	5500-9500	OF-5
Oberarbeitsführer	RADm 5	7000-9700	354	Maidenoberstabsführerin	RADw 2	4800-8400	OF-4
Arbeitsführer	RADm 6	5200-8400	882	Maidenstabsführerin	RADw 3	3800-5900	OF-3
Oberstfeldmeister	RADm 7	4800-7000	3 205	Maidenhauptführerin	RADw 4	2500-4250	OF-2
Oberfeldmeister	RADm 8a	3000-5300	3 669	Maidenoberführerin	RADw 5	2100-3100	OF-1
Feldmeister	RADm 8b	2400-4600	4 934	Maidenführerin	RADw 6	1440-2200	OF-1
Unterfeldmeister	RADm 9	2350-3500	7 805	Maidenunterführerin	RADw 7	1200-1650	OR-9
Obertruppführer	RADm 11a	2000-2700	13 576				OR-6
Truppführer	RADm 11b	1140-1424,40	13 894				OR-5

Mean annual pay for an industrial worker was 1,459 Reichsmarks in 1939, and for a privately employed white-collar worker 2,772 Reichsmarks.
