= Hauptscharführer =

Nazi paramilitary rank

- Gorget patch

- Shoulder and camo insignia
- Country: Nazi Germany
- Service branch: Schutzstaffel
- Abbreviation: Hschaf
- Formation: 1934
- Abolished: 1945
- Next higher rank: Untersturmführer (Allgemeine SS); Sturmscharführer (Waffen-SS)
- Next lower rank: Oberscharführer
- Equivalent ranks: Oberfeldwebel

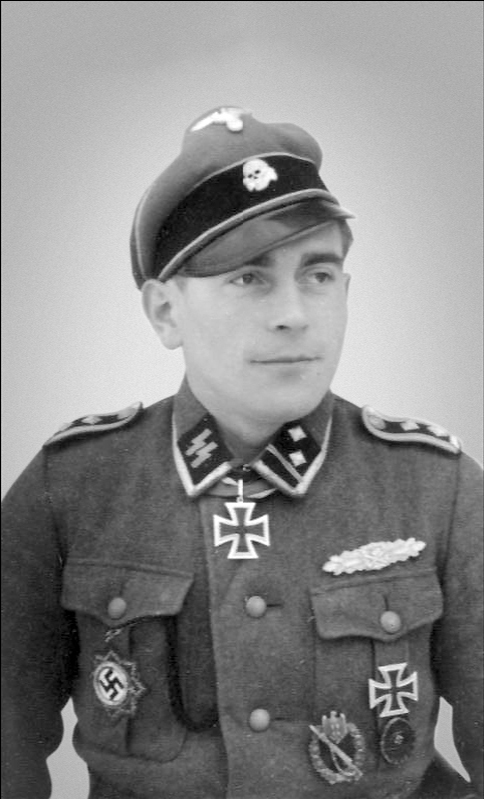
Hauptscharführer of the Waffen-SS (Gustav Schreiber)

Hauptscharführer ([ˈhaʊ̯pt.ʃaːɐ̯fyːʁɐ] lit. 'Head squad leader') was a Nazi paramilitary rank which was used by the Schutzstaffel (SS) between the years of 1934 and 1945. The rank was the highest enlisted rank of the SS, with the exception of the special Waffen-SS rank of Sturmscharführer.

The Hauptscharführer became an SS rank after reorganization of the SS following the Night of the Long Knives. The first use of Hauptscharführer was in June 1934 when the rank replaced the older SA title of Obertruppführer.

Within the Allgemeine-SS (general-SS), a Hauptscharführer was typically the head SS-non-commissioned officer of an SS-Sturm (company) or was a rank used by enlisted staff personnel assigned to an SS headquarters office or security agency (such as the Gestapo and Sicherheitsdienst (SD)).

The rank of Hauptscharführer was also commonly used in the concentration camp service and could also be found as a rank of the Einsatzgruppen. The rank of SS-Hauptscharführer was senior to SS-Oberscharführer and junior to SS-Sturmscharführer, except in the General-SS where Hauptscharführer was immediately junior to rank of SS-Untersturmführer.

In the Waffen-SS, Hauptscharführer was a rank bestowed upon company and battalion non-commissioned officers and was considered the second highest enlisted rank, below that of Sturmscharführer. Those holding the Waffen-SS rank of Hauptscharführer were typically also granted the title of Stabsscharführer, which was an appointment held by the senior SS non-commissioned officer of a company, battalion, or regiment.

The insignia for Hauptscharführer was two silver pips, with a silver stripe centred on a black collar patch. On field grey uniforms, the rank was worn with silver collar piping and the Wehrmacht shoulder boards of an Oberfeldwebel.

== Insignia ==
Examples of rank insignia Waffen-SS

Shoulder strap
SS-Hauptscharführer

...
SS-Standartenoberjunker

Gorget patches
SS-Hauptscharführer
SS-Standartenoberjunker

SS smock insignia

Junior Rank; Oberscharführer	SS rank Hauptscharführer	Senior Rank; Untersturmführer (Allgemeine-SS); Sturmscharführer (Waffen-SS)

== See also ==
- Table of ranks and insignia of the Waffen-SS

== Bibliography ==
- Flaherty, T. H. (2004) [1988]. The Third Reich: The SS. Time-Life Books, Inc. ISBN 1-84447-073-3.
- Lumsden, Robin (2000). A Collector's Guide To: The Waffen–SS. Ian Allan Publishing, Inc. ISBN 0-7110-2285-2.
- McNab, Chris (2009). The SS: 1923–1945. Amber Books Ltd. ISBN 978-1-906626-49-5.
