= Uniforms and insignia of the Schutzstaffel =

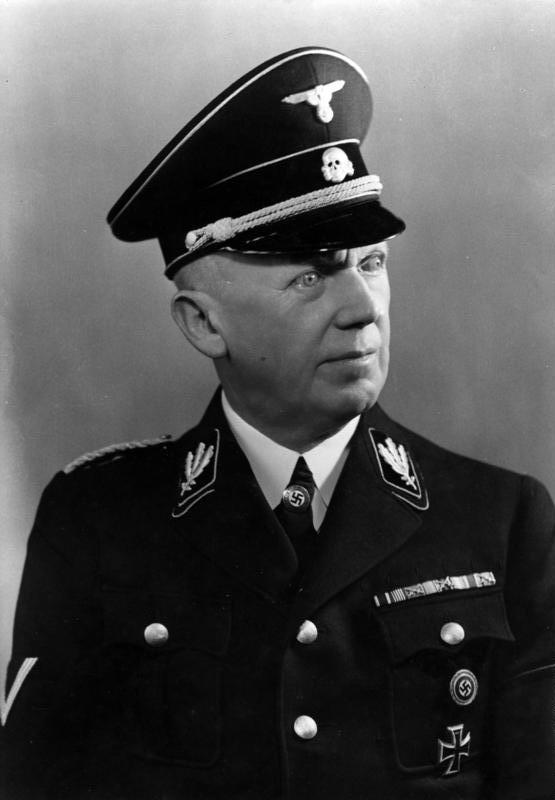
SS–Brigadeführer Hans Lammers in black Allgemeine SS uniform, 1938

The uniforms and insignia of the Schutzstaffel (SS) served to distinguish its Nazi paramilitary ranks between 1925 and 1945 from the ranks of the Wehrmacht (the German armed forces from 1935), the German state, and the Nazi Party.

== Uniform design and function ==
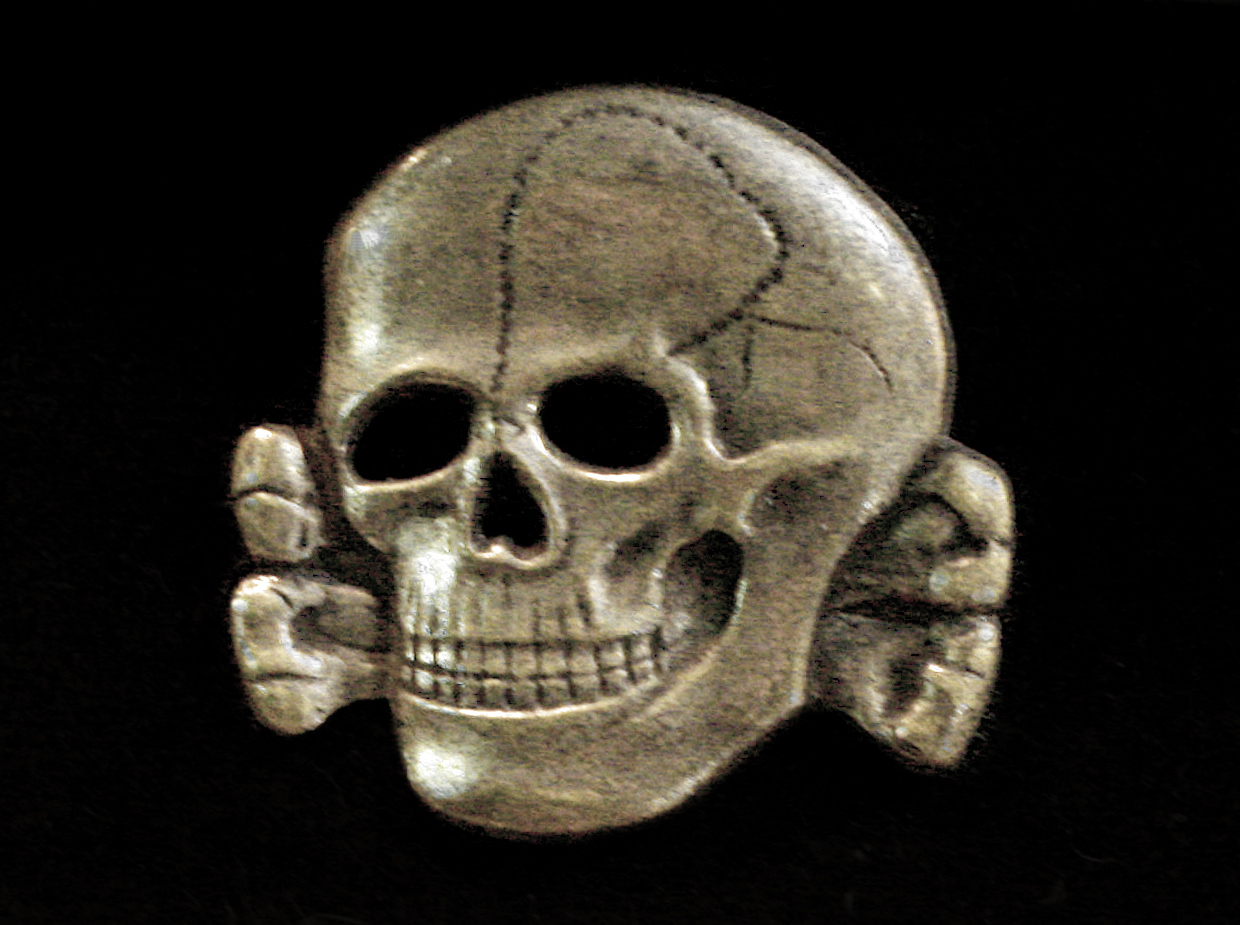
2nd pattern SS Totenkopf, 1934–45

While different uniforms existed for the SS over time, the all-black SS uniform adopted in 1932 is the most well known. The black–white–red colour scheme was characteristic of the German Empire, and it was later adopted by the Nazi Party. Further, black was popular with fascist movements: a black uniform was introduced by the blackshirts in Italy before the creation of the SS. There was a traditional reason, too: just as the Prussian kings' and emperors' life-guard cavalry (Leibhusaren) had worn black uniforms with skull-and-crossbones badges, so would the Führer's bodyguard unit. These SS uniforms were tailored to project authority and foster fear. During the war, the German clothing factory that eventually became the international menswear powerhouse Hugo Boss produced thousands of SS and other uniforms.

Once the war began, the black uniform was seldom worn. The combat units of the SS-Verfügungstruppe (SS-VT) and the later Waffen-SS wore a variation of the field-grey (grey-green) (feldgrau) army uniform with SS insignia. The majority of SS personnel wore a variation of the Waffen-SS uniform or the grey-green SS service tunic. Branches with personnel that normally would wear civilian attire in the Reich (such as the Gestapo and Kripo) were issued grey-green SS uniforms in occupied territory to avoid being mistaken for civilians.

SS uniforms used a variety of insignia, the most standard of which were collar patches, to denote rank, and shoulder cords, to denote both rank and position, along with sleeve cuff titles and "sleeve diamond" patches, to indicate membership in specific branches of the SS.

== Uniform designs and styles ==
=== Early SS uniforms (1925–1928) ===
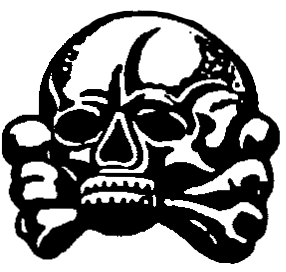
The traditional "Prussia" Totenkopf worn by the SS, 1923–34

The SS could trace its origins to several early Freikorps and Nazi Party formations, among them the Erhardt Naval Brigade, Der Stahlhelm, and most significantly the Sturmabteilung (SA), of which the SS was originally a subordinate organisation.

The very first SA uniforms and insignia were paramilitary uniforms fashioned by early Nazis which incorporated parts from World War I uniforms to include such features used by other Freikorps formation such as high boots, daggers, and the kepi hat. The 8-man Stabswache (staff guard), Adolf Hitler's bodyguard, soon renamed the Stoßtrupp (shock troop), also adopted in May 1923 the Totenkopf (death's head) and oak leaf as a means of insignia, both of which were already deeply rooted in European military history.

In 1924, while the Nazi Party was legally banned following the Beer Hall Putsch, Frontbann (underground SA) leader Gerhard Roßbach located a large store of war-surplus brown denim shirts in Austria, originally intended for tropical uniforms. When the SA (which included the nascent SS) was re-founded in 1925 following Hitler's release from prison, these brown shirts were issued as part of the uniforms.

In 1925, Hitler ordered the formation of a new bodyguard unit, the Schutzkommando (protection command). It was formed by Julius Schreck and included old Stoßtrupp members, Emil Maurice and Erhard Heiden. The only insignia was the swastika armband, usually homemade, except for the handful of men constituting the Stoßtrupp successor, the Schutzkommando, who continued the use of the Totenkopf pinned to cap or collar. That same year, the Schutzkommando was expanded to a national level. It was renamed successively the Sturmstaffel (storm squadron), and finally the Schutzstaffel (protection squadron), abbreviated to SS (on 9 November). In the following year adopted its first recognisable rank insignia system, with the rank and file of the SS, like the rest of the SA, still wearing a variety of brown shirts or paramilitary uniforms.

Early SA armband using the rank stripe system, here: Hundertschaftsführer of the SA

The early rank system of 1926 consisted of a swastika armband worn with yellow (gold) and white (silver) stripes, with the number of stripes determining the rank of the bearer. Thus, the early SS used a ranking system that could be derived from that of their superordinate SA. This is why the SS also used the system that represented the function of the SS leader with the help of stripes on the armband (Dienststellungs-Armbinde). All strips (gold and silver) had a uniform height of 1 cm. What all armbands had in common was that they also had 1 black ribbed stripe on each edge.

- Reichsstaffelführer in der Obersten SA-Führung (national leader): three golden stripes
- Stellvertreter (deputy national leader): three silver stripes
- Gau-SS-Führer (district leader): two golden stripes
- Stellvertreter (deputy district leader): two silver stripes
- Örtlicher SS-Führer (regional leader): one golden stripe
- Stellvertreter (deputy regional leader): one silver stripe
- Staffelmann (trooper): no stripes

Under the above system, basic SS troopers were organised into 10-man Staffeln, each under the authority of a Staffelführer. SS districts, known as SS-Gaus, were under the authority of a Gauführer while all SS district leaders answered to a national leader of the SS called the Reichsführer, at this time Joseph Berchtold. In line with the Führerprinzip (leader principle) of the Nazi Party's ideology, the word Führer was incorporated into all ranks except those for basic SS troopers.

By 1927, the Sturmabteilung had greatly increased its numbers and had standardised the "brown shirt" uniform, which would thereafter be permanently associated with that group: shirt, tie, breeches, boots, and cylindrical kepi, all brown. The SS was at this time a small unit within the SA and wore the same brown SA uniform, with the addition of a black tie and a black cap with a Totenkopf skull and bones symbol to distinguish themselves.

By this time, with influences from the Stahlhelm, the SA leadership adopted its first collar insignia and also added a new SA rank of Standartenführer (standard leader) in charge of regiment-sized Standarten (incorporating the company sized Staffeln); the SS at this time adopted the same rank as well.

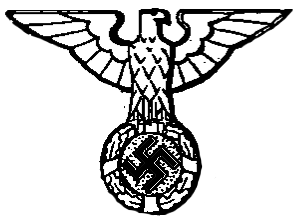
1st pattern Party eagle worn by the SS, 1927–36

The 1927 ranks had no insignia for SA/SS troopers (still known by the title "Mann") and the previous rank of Staffelführer had become shortened to simply Führer (leader). The higher SS ranks of Standartenführer, Gauführer, and Reichsführer like their SA counterparts now used a system of oak leaves displayed on both collars of the brown SA shirt. One oak leaf signified a Standartenführer, two a Gauführer, and three oak leaves were worn by Reichsführer-SS Berchtold and his successor Erhard Heiden, who reported directly to the Oberste SA-Führer.

Over the course of the next year, the burgeoning SA saw the emergence of new units and ranks, and for the first time a comprehensive system of rank insignia. A basic squad unit, the 10-man Schar, was grouped into platoon-sized Truppen, and these into company-sized Stürme which in turn made up battalion-sized Sturmbanne. New ranks went with the new formations: Scharführer, with one pip worn on the left collar patch, Truppführer, two pips, Sturmführer, three pips, and Sturmbannführer, four pips. On the right collar of SA uniforms was worn a patch with two numbers indicating Standarte and Sturmbann affiliation. As the SS numbered fewer than a thousand men, it did not adopt the Sturmbann unit at this time, and right-hand SS collar patches displayed the number of the Standarte only.

At the higher end of the organisation, in 1928 the SA Gau-Stürme were restructured into regional Gruppen, each commanded by a leader with a new general-officer rank, Gruppenführer; its insignia was the three oak leaf collar patch. At this time the former rank of Gauführer was renamed Oberführer (senior leader).

The collar patches of the SA were color-coded: each Gruppe had its own distinctive color. The SS was considered to be a Gruppe unto itself; its color, naturally, was black, and Reichsführer-SS Heiden held the rank of Gruppenfuhrer and wore its three oak leaf insignia.

=== SS Brownshirts (1929–1932) ===
In 1929, under new Reichsführer-SS Heinrich Himmler, the SS codified its first uniform regulations: the signature black color was extended to breeches, boots, armband edges, and belt and crossbelt; the shirt collar was edged in black-and-white twist cord except for those of senior leaders, which were trimmed in silver.

The ability to produce and issue complete uniforms came about due both to the centralisation of the Reichszeugmeisterei (RZM; national quartermaster office) under NSDAP Treasurer Franz Xaver Schwarz, and to Himmler's expansion and reorganisation of the fast-growing SS (from 280 members to 52,000 between 1929 and 1932) into several brigade-sized Brigaden throughout Germany, each comprising three to five regiment-sized Standarten. Within the Standarten now existed two to three battalion-sized Sturmbanne (storm units), and beneath this level were the Stürme, Truppen, and Scharen.

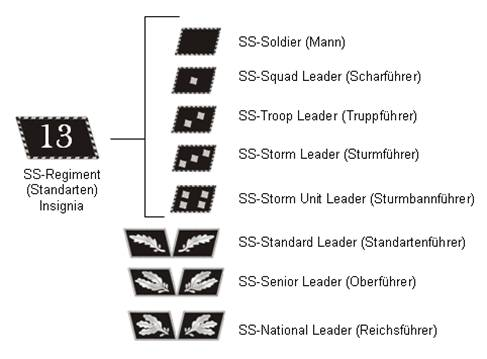
The earliest SS rank system, used during the year 1929

For the lower ranks, the SS also specified that a patch showing the wearer's regiment (Standarte) would be worn opposite the badge of rank while the higher SS leaders would continue to wear oak leaf insignia on both collars. Collar tabs below the rank of Sturmführer were edged in black-and-white twist cord; those of Sturm and Sturmbann leaders used black-and-silver while those of senior leaders were edged in solid silver cord.

In addition to the collar unit insignia, the SS now created a cuffband system which was worn on the lower left sleeve. These cuffbands were black and displayed the bearer's Sturm number together with color-coded edges indicating the Sturmbann, which in conjunction with the collar insignia showed regiment, battalion, and company affiliation. Leaders above the company level did not at this time use the cuffband system.

The holder of the title of Reichsführer was still considered an SA-Gruppenführer, with Reichsführer itself not yet an actual rank. In addition, for a brief period in 1929, the rank of Standartenführer was divided into two separate grades, known as Standartenführer (I) and Standartenführer (II); the insignia of one oak leaf was used for both positions. This situation was another reflection of the SS' rapid expansion: Oberführers now commanded the three newly created SS-Oberführerbereiche, east, west and south; and so a senior Standartenführer was promoted to command each SS-Brigade.

Hitler's personal guard, known at this stage by the original SS name of Stabswache (later to be known as the Leibstandarte Adolf Hitler), was also expressing its independence and increasing its size under the leadership of Sepp Dietrich.

The Stennes revolt of August 1930, in which members of the SA attacked the Berlin party Gau headquarters which was defended by the SS, had profound consequences for the SA and its relationship to its subordinate organisation. In an open letter to Berlin SS leader Kurt Daluege, Hitler proclaimed SS Mann, deine Ehre heißt Treue! (SS soldier, your honour is called loyalty!). Subsequently, Meine Ehre heißt Treue (My honour is loyalty) was adopted by the SS as its motto. More significantly, Hitler cashiered SA head Franz Pfeffer von Salomon and assumed the position of Oberste SA-Führer personally, and simultaneously promoted both Himmler and Daluege to the new rank of SS-Obergruppenführer. Daluege was the SS leader of Northern Germany while Himmler controlled southern SS units out of Munich while serving as the National Leader for the SS; this move had the effect of rendering the loyal SS practically independent of the suspect SA, since Himmler and Daluege now outranked all SA commanders.

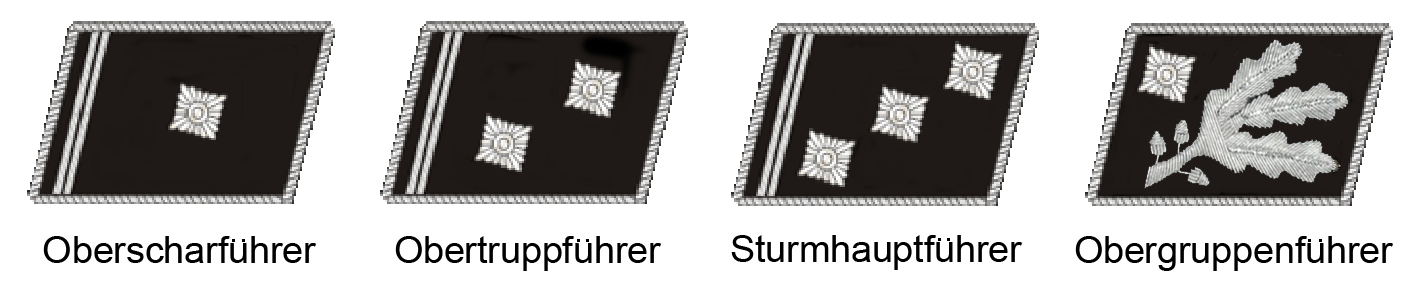
The transitional SS ranks of 1930

Another result of the Stennes revolt was Hitler's recall of his old Putsch comrade Ernst Röhm from South America to take over the day-to-day running of the SA with the title of SA-Stabschef. While Hitler thought that this would bind the SA more firmly to him, Röhm had other ambitions, including the conversion of the paramilitary Sturmabteilung into an army. With his expansions, promotions, and changes to the SA, a revision of the SA rank system was required although the uniforms and titles essentially stayed the same. The first major change was the addition of new ranks modeled on the original titles created in 1928 but with the addition of "senior" and "head" designators (ober and haupt): these were Oberscharführer, Obertruppführer, and Sturmhauptführer. The new rank insignia were created by adding a silver stripe to the collar pips of the next-lower rank.

SS ranks in 1931
Generals	Officers	Enlisted
Obergruppenführer	Standartenführer	Obertruppführer
Gruppenführer	Sturmbannführer	Truppführer
Brigadeführer	Sturmhauptführer	Oberscharführer
Oberführer	Sturmführer	Scharführer
		Mann

A 1930 change to the SS uniform was the addition of a single narrow shoulder strap worn on the right side. There were four grades of shoulder strap: until 1933 a black-and-white pattern was worn by SS troopers, an epaulette of parallel silver cords by Sturm and Sturmbann leaders, a twisted pattern in silver cord by standarten-, ober-, and Gruppenführers, and a braided silver shoulderboard by the two Obergruppenführers.

By 1931, Himmler was secure (or independent) enough to reorganise the SS, formerly one SA-Gruppe, into five SS-Gruppen divided into several Brigaden led by officers with the new rank of Brigadeführer; its insignia was the two oak leaves of an Oberführer with a pip.

=== SS black uniforms (1932–1934) ===
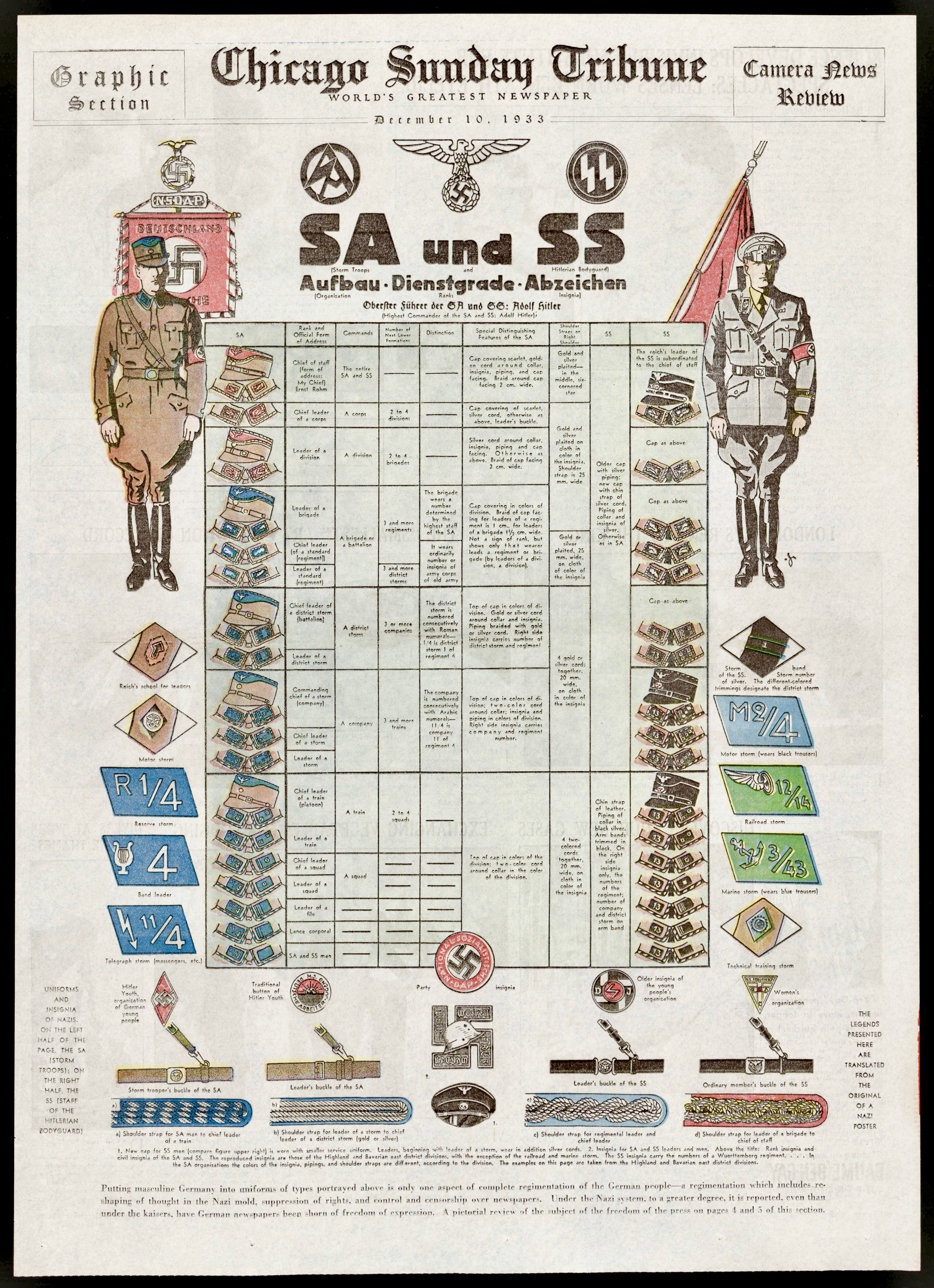
German poster showing uniforms and insignia of SS (to the right) and the Sturmabteilung (SA, to the left), published in English by the Chicago Sunday Tribune in 1933. The caption reads: Putting masculine Germany into uniforms of types portrayed above is only one aspect of complete regimentation of the German people – a regimentation which includes reshaping of thought in the Nazi mold, suppression of rights, and control and censorship over newspapers.

In 1932, the SS introduced its best-known uniform, the black ensemble designed by Karl Diebitsch and graphic designer and SS member Walter Heck. The shirt remained brown as a nod to the SA, of which the SS was still nominally a part, but all else was black from high boots to the new military-style peaked cap, aside from the red armband. SS men were also issued black wool greatcoats for inclement weather, which similarly carried the armband, epaulette, and collar patches. Around this time, a belt buckle featuring the motto Meine Ehre heißt Treue (My honour is loyalty) in its design was produced by the Overhoff firm to replace the SA buckle.

Two new junior positions were introduced: Sturmmann and Rottenführer. By this time, Himmler had also increased scrutiny on SS membership with a particular focus on proof of "Aryan" ancestry, and created a "candidate" position known as SS-Anwärter, which prospective SS members were required to hold for at least six months before formally joining the SS as an SS-Mann. With membership continuing to increase, Röhm invented two new officer ranks: Obersturmführer and Obersturmbannführer.

SS rank insignia pattern from 1933

In 1933, after Hitler had become Chancellor, the SS began to make more of a distinction between 'officers' and 'enlisted men;' an SS man could now only be promoted to Sturmführer with Himmler's approval, based upon the Reichsführer’s personal review of the candidate's application. Himmler always detested the army's class distinctions. It was forbidden for SS men to follow the army custom of addressing superior officers by prefixing Herr to their rank, and Kamerad was an approved form of address under most circumstances.

SS-Haupttruppführer insignia

SS armband (1925–1945)

Decals of the SS used on various helmets (also used by the Waffen-SS)

Also in 1933, the runes insignia was introduced, which would eventually become known as the symbol for the entire SS. The first use of the SS runes was as a unit insignia limited only to members of the Leibstandarte Adolf Hitler which had replaced the Army Chancellery Guard to become Hitler's main protectors. It was at this time that the Leibstandarte moved from being a "paramilitary" formation armed with pistols and truncheons to "military", equipped with rifles, bayonets, and steel helmets. The adaptation of this particular unit insignia was largely the work of Sepp Dietrich who on 4 November 1933, declared the unit an independent formation and, although a part of the SS, answerable to Hitler alone. Dietrich even went so far as to forbid Himmler from entering the Berlin Leibstandarte barracks and, for a brief few months in 1933, ordered his Leibstandarte soldiers to wear the black uniform without a swastika armband in order to differentiate the bodyguard unit from the rank and file of the Allgemeine SS (General SS) units throughout Germany.

At the same time Dietrich and the Leibstandarte adopted the SS runes as their unit insignia, the full-time SS headquarters and command staffs began using a blank collar patch, without a unit number, to differentiate themselves from the "rank and file" SS units in Germany which were still using regiment Standarten numbers as their unit insignia. Thus, by the end of 1933, there were three unit collar insignia patches in existence: the SS runes used by the Leibstandarte, the blank collar patch used by the SS headquarters and command staff, and the numbered SS unit insignia worn by regular SS companies throughout Germany.

SS unit insignia (1934)

In 1934, with the rise of the SS-Verfügungstruppe (SS-VT), the SS runes unit insignia was expanded to these other formations of the then fledgling military arm of the SS (later to become known as the Waffen-SS). To separate these new military formations from the main Leibstandarte regiment under Dietrich, the SS runes worn by the Verfügungstruppe displayed a small number corresponding to the particular SS-VT regiment of the bearer. In all, there were three possible numbers: _{1} for members of the Deutschland regiment, _{2} for Germania personnel, and (from 1938) _{3} for members of the Der Führer regiment. These insignia would survive throughout World War II and were kept in use after the three original regiments had expanded to full-sized military regimental strength in the war-time 2nd SS Division "Das Reich", roughly equivalent in size to their German Army counterparts.

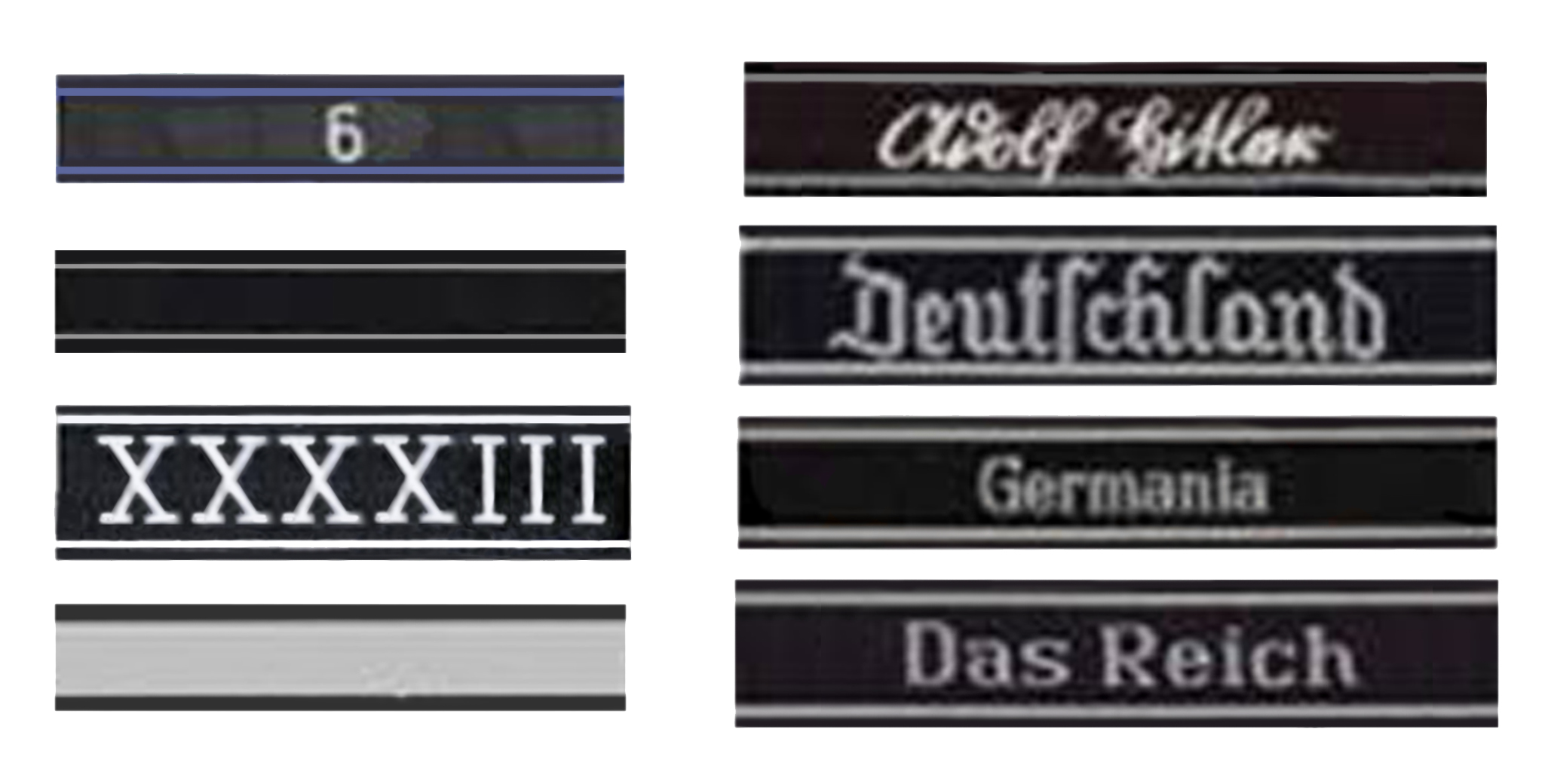
Selection of SS cuffbands

In addition to the expansion of the collar unit insignia system, the SS by 1934 had also greatly expanded the system of sleeve cuffbands which were now a standard part of the black uniform, worn on the lower left sleeve. Within the Allgemeine SS companies, cuffbands were worn in conjunction with a unit collar patch to denote regiment, battalion, and company affiliation. While the unit collar patch displayed the wearer's Standarte (regiment) number, the number denoted on the cuffband indicated the Sturm, or company, while collared piping along the cuffband further denoted in which battalion (Sturmbann) a member served.

For those personnel serving above the regiment level, a bare cuffband was worn or a cuffband bearing a Roman numeral could be displayed. The Roman numeral cuffband indicated membership on the staff of the SS-Brigade so numbered, which by the end of 1934 had become known as an SS-Abschnitt. For the even higher levels, such as Himmler or the senior SS-Gruppe leaders (later known by the title SS-Oberabschnitt Führer) a solid silver cuffband was worn.

Within the early military SS, which included the Leibstandarte and the formations of the SS-Verfügungstruppe, a series of cuffbands were introduced which bore the name of the regiment to which the bearer was assigned. The most coveted of these was the "Adolf Hitler" cuffband, carrying the Führer’s name in Sütterlin script, which was worn solely by members of the Leibstandarte.

=== SS pre-war uniforms (1934–1938) ===
Heinrich Himmler's insignia for Reichsführer-SS

The second version of the SS-Totenkopf; used from 1934 to 1945

An event that significantly altered the SS rank and insignia structure was the Night of the Long Knives, which occurred from 30 June to 2 July 1934. As a result of SS participation in the purge and execution of the SA leadership, the SS was declared an independent formation of the Nazi Party that answered only to Hitler. Several of the rank titles were renamed to completely separate the SS from its SA origins.

The most significant rank change was the creation of the rank of Reichsführer-SS to denote the commander of the SS. The new rank was the equivalent of a field marshal in the army. Prior to 1934, Himmler had been regarded simply as an SS-Obergruppenführer. Reichsführer was merely a title and not a rank prior to 1934, though Himmler preferred to use his title more than his rank. In addition to Himmler’s new rank, several of the original SS rank titles were renamed (although retained the same insignia), bringing about the final nomenclature of SS ranks which would be used until the SS was disbanded at the end of World War II.

SS rank (pre-1934)	SS rank (post-1934)
SS-Scharführer	SS-Unterscharführer
SS-Oberscharführer	SS-Scharführer
SS-Truppführer	SS-Oberscharführer
SS-Obertruppführer	SS-Hauptscharführer
SS-Haupttruppführer	SS-Sturmscharführer
SS-Sturmführer	SS-Untersturmführer
SS-Sturmhauptführer	SS-Hauptsturmführer

The change in SS rank titles applied mainly to the non-commissioned officer ranks as well as the ranks of Sturmführer and Sturmhauptführer which received new names. The titles of the remaining ranks remained unchanged.

In the wake of the "Röhm-Putsch", the SS officially took over the concentration camps from the SA and police. Soon thereafter, camp guards began wearing the Totenkopf on the right collar patch, to distinguish themselves from the numbered Allgemeine-SS Standarten. This was inconsistent in the early days; some guards instead wore tabs with the initial of their camp (e. g. "D" for Dachau), and some wore blank tabs. About 1935, the black uniform proving impractical for daily service wear, the Inspectorate of Concentration Camps adopted a working uniform in "earth-brown" (erdbraun), which was identical in cut to the black tunic except for shoulderboards on both sides. In March 1936, the camp "service" was formally established as the third branch of the SS, the Totenkopfverbände or Death's Head units

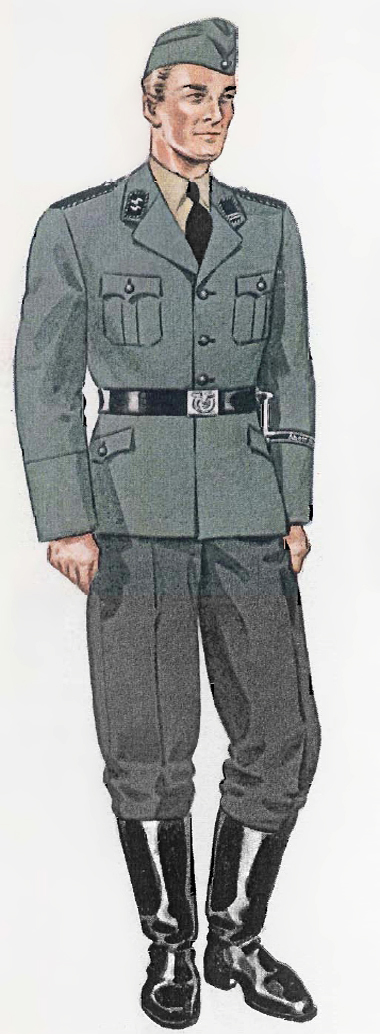
SS grey service uniform

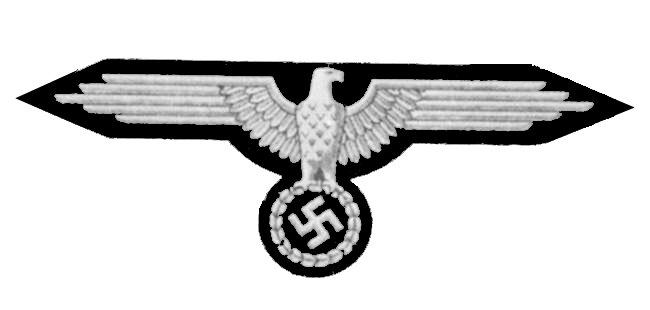
2nd pattern SS eagle, 1936–45

At about this same time, for similar reasons, the SS military formations (the Leibstandarte SS Adolf Hitler and the SS-Verfügungstruppe) adopted a service uniform in what was termed "earth-grey" (erdgrau). This also was based on the black uniform, but without the red swastika armband, its place on the left sleeve being taken by an eagle-and-swastika patch, and worn with trousers and shoes or calf-high jackboots. In June 1938 this uniform was authorised for full-time Allgemeine SS cadres as well; the LSSAH and SS-VT then adopted army-pattern shoulderboards to distinguish themselves from the general SS and emphasise their military role.

In February 1934, the Honour Chevron for the Old Guard (Ehrenwinkel für Alte Kämpfer; honour chevron for old campaigners) was introduced for all SS men who had joined the Nazi Party or a Party-affiliated organisation prior to January 30, 1933; after the Anschluss, it was also authorised for Austrians who had joined the DNSAP prior to 18 February 1938. It took the form of a silver lace chevron worn on the right sleeve. During this period, the principal SS insignia also underwent design changes. The ancient jawless Danziger style of Totenkopf was gradually replaced by the 'classic' SS skull, a naturalistic design with grinning jaws; the old form was taken up by the army's newly formed Panzerwaffe. Additionally, in March 1936, Hitler approved a new art deco eagle with staggered wingtips for the SS, which was worn through the end of the war as a cap badge and on the sleeve.

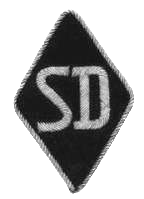
Sicherheitsdienst sleeve diamond (raute)

By the end of 1938, the SS had also adopted a new insignia feature of sleeve diamonds worn on the bottom of the left sleeve. Between 1939 and 1940, the SS expanded its cuffband and sleeve diamond system into a vast array of over 30 cuffbands and more than 12 sleeve diamonds.

=== SS uniforms of World War II (1939–1945) ===
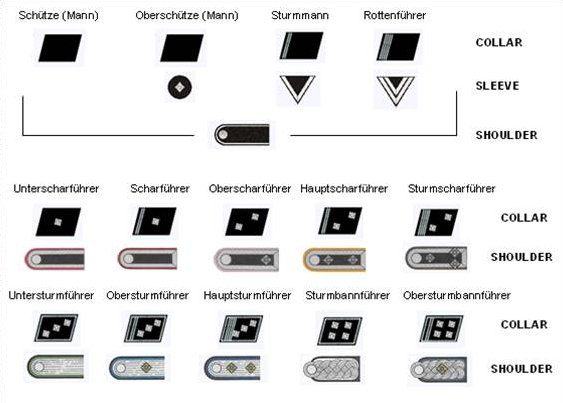
SS rank insignia for enlisted personnel and officers

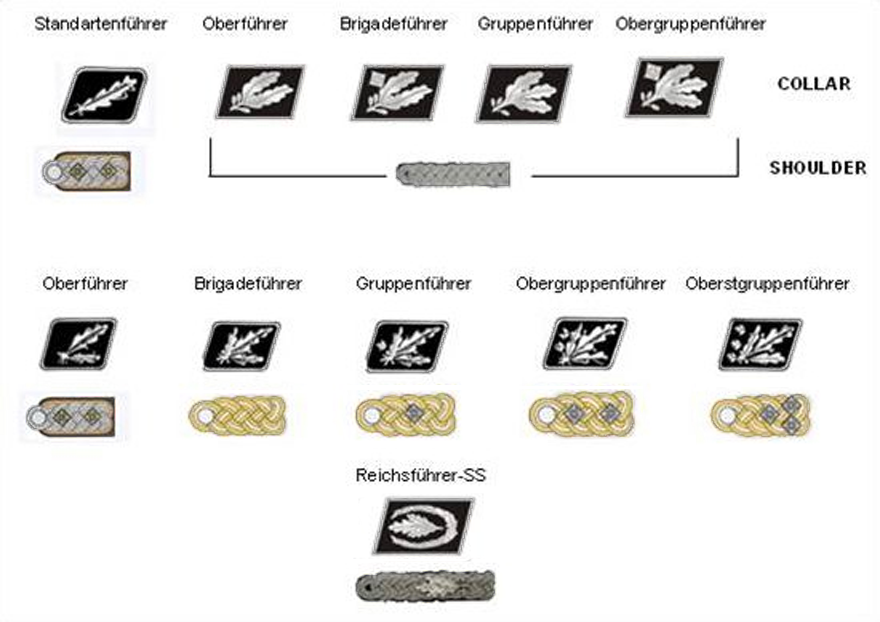
SS senior and general officer rank insignia, before (top row) and after (bottom row) April 1942

When World War II began in 1939, the Allgemeine SS grey service uniforms took on a more military appearance with the somewhat "ad-hoc" adoption of Wehrmacht-style shoulderboards, except for SS generals, who, until 1942, continued to wear the narrow braided silver SS shoulderboards to denote general rank. It was also at this time that the rank of SS-Oberführer lost its status as a general officer rank and was instead now regarded as a senior colonel position. The black uniform was increasingly seldom seen, eventually being worn only by part-time Allgemeine SS reservists. The last ceremonial event at which the black uniforms were worn "en masse" was the Berlin victory parade following the fall of France in June 1940. In 1942, Himmler ordered most of the black uniforms recalled and stripped of insignia. They were sent east for use by the native auxiliary police units and sent west to be used by Germanic SS units such as the ones in the Netherlands and Denmark. In 1937, the LSSAH and SS-VT had adopted a closed-collar feldgrau (grey-green) field uniform for combat wear, which with the outbreak of war became the standard uniform of what would soon be the Waffen-SS. This feldanzug was very similar to the Model 1936 army field uniform; however, the SS version had a somewhat wider collar in feldgrau (field-grey) rather than Heer bottle-green, the lower pockets were of the SS angled slash type, and the second button was placed lower to permit the collar optionally to be worn open with a necktie like the service-dress uniforms. The Totenkopf branch, which was designated the reserve for the Waffen-SS, also adopted this uniform. Waffen-SS Panzer troops wore a double-breasted black uniform similar to the army model, but somewhat different in cut; the SS also made extensive use of camouflage clothing as the war progressed. The full-time Allgemeine SS cadres, especially Reich Security Main Office (RSHA) personnel, continued to wear the earth-grey service-dress uniform.

A unique situation developed during World War II with regards to SS ranks held by those who had served in Allgemeine SS positions from before the outbreak of war and now wished to serve with the Waffen-SS. With such persons being SS members already, it was expected that they would join the Waffen-SS in order to serve in combat; some members in fact had no choice and were drafted for combat service due to their Allgemeine SS billet being done away with or, in situations involving disciplinary actions, transferred into combat as the result of a hearing before an SS and police court; Wilhelm Höttl was one such example.

As a result of Allgemeine SS members transferring into the Waffen-SS, SS members held two separate ranks – one in the Allgemeine SS and another in the Waffen-SS. Waffen-SS officers could also hold a regular or reserve commission, with most Allgemeine SS members being appointed to the Waffen-SS reserves (the intent was to easily be able to place such members on inactive duty once the war had ended).

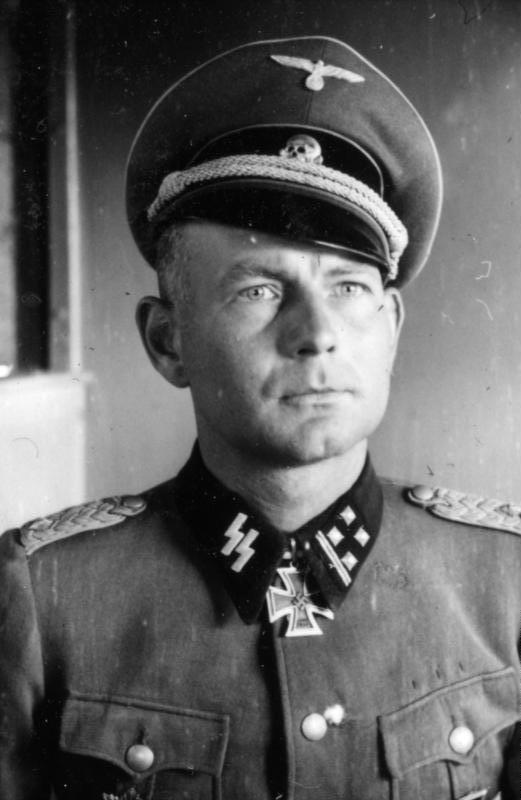
Obersturmbannführer Otto Kumm in Waffen-SS uniform

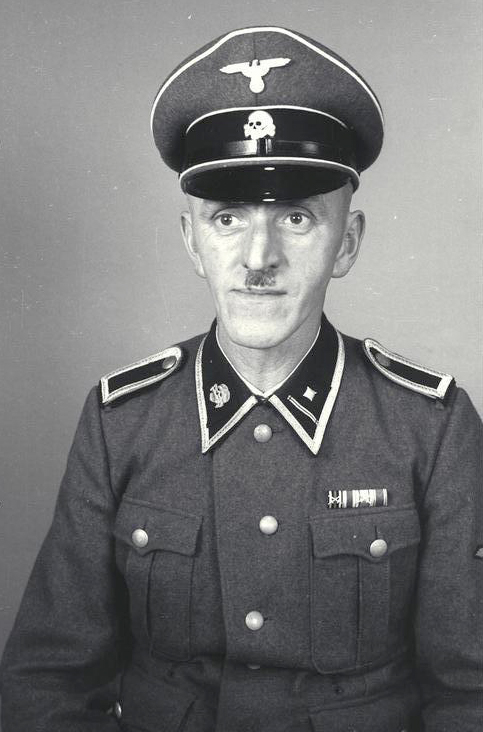
A concentration camp SS-Scharführer wearing a grey-green field uniform. The silver-grey braid on the collar was used by all SS non-commissioned officers.

Heinrich Himmler in service dress uniform

The security forces of the SS, such as SD troops that were part of the Einsatzgruppen, were also all considered part of the Allgemeine SS, even though many of these persons (especially in the field) wore uniforms nearly identical to the Waffen-SS; to further the confusion, many agents of the security police (SiPo) in such "field" roles wore Waffen-SS uniform even though they were not ex officio members of any branch of the SS. By 1943, the SS had made a determined effort that most field personnel (including concentration camp staffs) were granted Waffen-SS ranks and, in 1944, any Allgemeine SS who served in an area that commanded SS combat troops, was granted a Waffen-SS commission.

Another uniform insignia change occurred in April 1942 with the creation of the rank of SS-Oberst-Gruppenführer. This necessitated an insignia change for SS generals and all SS generals at this time began wearing Wehrmacht-style gold shoulder boards; Oberführers wore the shoulderboards of an army Oberst (colonel), just as Standartenführers did. The sole exception was Himmler who continued to wear the silver braided shoulderboard with oak leaves of his rank as Reichsführer-SS. At the same time the collar patches for general officers were revised; the 1942 pattern used three oak leaves, rather straighter than the old style, with zero to three pips indicating rank from Brigadeführer through Oberstgruppenführer.

SS uniform suppliers could not keep up with wartime demand and, as a result, the Waffen-SS and Totenkopfverbande frequently wore uniforms drawn from army stocks, with the addition of SS insignia. By the middle of World War II, a wide variety of uniforms could be observed, even within the same unit.

Waffen-SS and SS-TV members during this period wore army-style shoulderboards with SS collar patches; edging of enlisted and non-commissioned officer collar tabs was discontinued in 1940 while SS officers' collar patches continued to be trimmed in silver. Enlisted shoulderboards were made of black fabric as opposed to army dark green or field-grey (grey-green), and officers had a black underlay; all shoulderboards were piped in waffenfarbe (branch-colour). Junior leaders (Sturmmann and Rottenführer) wore sleeve chevrons corresponding to army insignia (Gefreiter and Obergefreiter), but with black backing; SS non-commissioned officers wore army-style silver-grey braid around the collar.

By 1943, a special staff non-commissioned officer position, known as Stabsscharführer had been adopted by the Waffen-SS. This position, equivalent to an army Hauptfeldwebel, was denoted by a special sleeve insignia and was not an actual rank, but rather a title for the head SS non-commissioned officer of a particular combat unit. The rank of Sturmscharführer was also unique to the Waffen-SS as a type of regimental sergeant major.

The staffs of concentration camps had by now standardised the skull collar patch, whereas between 1934 and 1938 the Totenkopf as well as various camp specific collar patches, displaying Germanic letters, had been used as unit insignia. Other unit insignia collar patches included a Standarte-number patch for most of the Allgemeine SS, a blank collar patch worn by SS main office staffs and Sicherheitsdienst (and some SiPo) personnel, the sig-runes Waffen-SS patch (adopted after 1943 as the standard unit collar patch for most of the SS), and a numbered skull patch which was used by personnel serving in field units of the Totenkopfverbände; the three senior Totenkopfstandarten, formed into the Totenkopf division, would retain these collar patches throughout the war, but the remaining TK-Standarten were redesignated SS-Regimenter and switched to sig-runes in February 1941. As the war went on, the Waffen-SS recruited heavily among conquered populations, creating 'ethnic' brigades and divisions. These formations wore, in place of the sig-runes, distinctive unit collar patches identifying them as Freiwillige (foreign volunteers). In the last days of World War II, the SS also created a twin swastika collar patch which was used by the "auxiliary SS" which were non-SS members conscripted to serve in concentration camp positions.

SS generals of the Waffen-SS were typically addressed by both their SS rank title and a corresponding general's rank associated with the Wehrmacht. All such general ranks were followed by the phrase der Waffen-SS to distinguish the SS General from their counterparts in the branches of the German military. Thus, a typical title was Obergruppenführer und General der Waffen-SS.

== Final SS ranks, 1934–1945 ==
SS rank	SS insignia			Literal translation	SA equivalent	Heer/Luftwaffe equivalent	British equivalent
SS rank	Collar badge (Note: As from April 1942.)	Shoulder strap	Sleeve patch	Literal translation	SA equivalent	Heer/Luftwaffe equivalent	British equivalent
Generalführer – General officers
Oberster Führer der SS (Note: Adolf Hitler received the rank of Oberster Führer der SS, 'Supreme Leader of the SS,' in 1934, but never wore an SS uniform, nor was any insignia designed for that rank.)	–	–	–	Supreme Leader of the SS	Oberster SA-Führer	Reichsmarschall	None
Reichsführer-SS				National leader	Stabschef SA	Generalfeldmarschall	Field marshal
Oberst-Gruppenführer (from 1942)				Supreme group leader	None	Generaloberst	General
Obergruppenführer				Senior group leader	Obergruppenführer	General der Waffengattung	Lieutenant-general
Gruppenführer				Group leader	Gruppenführer	Generalleutnant	Major general
Brigadeführer				Brigade leader	Brigadeführer	Generalmajor	Brigadier
Stabsführer – Staff officers
Oberführer				Senior leader	Oberführer	Oberst or Brigadier	Colonel/Brigadier
Standartenführer				Regiment leader	Standartenführer	Oberst	Colonel
Obersturmbannführer				Senior assault unit leader	Obersturmbannführer	Oberstleutnant	Lieutenant colonel
Sturmbannführer				Assault unit leader	Sturmbannführer	Major	Major
Truppenführer – Troop/Platoon officers
Hauptsturmführer				Chief assault leader	Hauptsturmführer	Hauptmann/Rittmeister	Captain
Obersturmführer				Senior assault leader	Obersturmführer	Oberleutnant	Lieutenant
Untersturmführer				Junior assault leader	Sturmführer	Leutnant	Second lieutenant
Unterführer – Non-commissioned officers
Sturmscharführer (Waffen-SS)				Assault squad leader	Haupttruppführer	Stabsfeldwebel	Warrant officer class I
Hauptscharführer				Chief squad leader	Obertruppführer	Oberfeldwebel	Warrant officer class II
Oberscharführer				Senior squad leader	Truppführer	Feldwebel	Staff sergeant/Colour sergeant
Scharführer				Squad leader	Oberscharführer	Unterfeldwebel	Sergeant
Unterscharführer				Junior squad leader	Scharführer	Unteroffizier	Corporal/Bombardier
Mannschaften – Men at arms/Soldiers
Rottenführer				Section leader	Rottenführer	Obergefreiter	Lance corporal/Bombardier
Sturmmann				Storm man	Sturmmann	Gefreiter	Senior private
Oberschütze (Waffen-SS, from 1942)				Senior rifleman	None	Obersoldat	None
Mann; Schütze (Waffen-SS)			–	Trooper rifleman	Mann	Soldat	Private
Anwärter		–	–	Candidate	None	None	None
Bewerber (from 1943)	–	–	–	Applicant	None	None	None

== Police ranks and insignia ==
In 1936, the regular German police, previously agencies of the Länder or states, were nationalised and placed under Himmler, who was named Chef der Deutschen Polizei (Chief of German Police). The ordinary uniformed police were called the Ordnungspolizei (order police). Known as the Orpo, the Ordnungspolizei maintained a separate system of Orpo ranks, insignia, and uniforms. It was also possible for SS members to hold dual status in both the Orpo and the SS, and SS generals were referred to simultaneously by both rank titles. For instance, an Obergruppenführer in the SS who was also a police general would be referred to as Obergruppenführer und General der Polizei (Obergruppenführer and General of the Police). In late 1939, Orpo personnel were formed into a combat division, recognisable by its use of police insignia; in 1942, this formation was absorbed into the Waffen-SS to become the 4th SS-Polizei Panzergrenadier Division.

== Germanic SS uniforms and foreign units rank ==
Germanic SS uniforms were modified versions of the original black Allgemeine SS uniforms and were used strictly by the Germanic SS in occupied countries. These units were provided with surplus black uniforms upon which were displayed country specific insignia. This led to a wide variety of insignia and rank titles depending on the country of origin, although standardised throughout the entire Germanic SS were the rank insignia pips and oak leaves used by the SS proper. The Germanic SS effectively ceased to exist in late 1944, after which time most of its members were folded into the foreign legions of the Waffen-SS.

As with the SS titles, recruits of non-Germanic countries had the title "Waffen" prefixed to their rank. For instance, an Unterscharführer in the foreign legions would be referred to as Waffen-Unterscharführer whereas a regular SS member would be addressed as SS-Unterscharführer. This helped to indicate non-native recruits, or to separate Germanic individuals in the divisions composed primarily of non-Germanics.

== Special SS uniforms ==
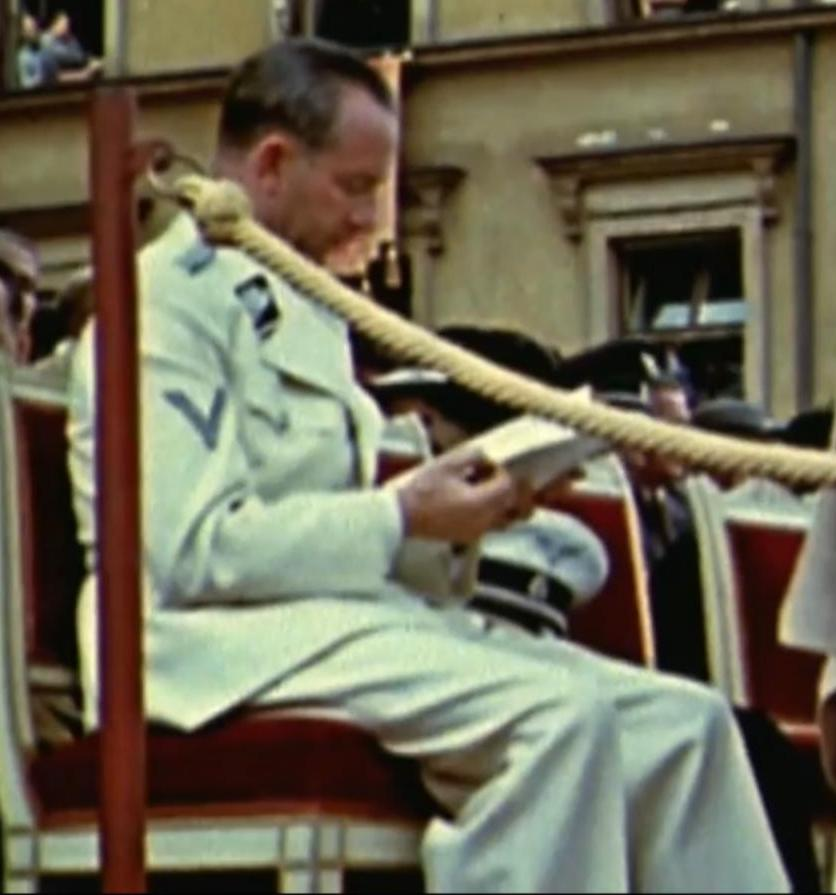
White summer dress

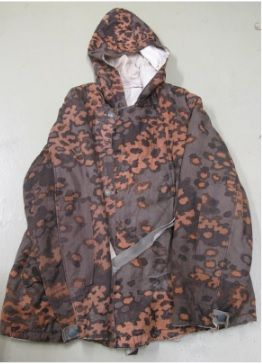
SS reversible winter parka

SS officers had the option of purchasing formal dress and mess dress uniforms. The formal uniform was not unlike U.S. or UK dinner-dress uniforms, cut like a civilian tailcoat without the tails, and worn with white or black bowtie and waistcoat.

For use in hot weather climates like Southern Europe and North Africa, a tropical uniform of tan cotton was developed. Insignia was similar to that of standard SS uniforms but in tan thread on black backing. Waffen-SS troops were pioneering among German forces in the use of camouflage clothing and wore it extensively during the war. Usually, the camouflage patterns were worn on overall parkas, reversible smocks or helmet covers, with camouflaged tunics being introduced later during the war. Uniforms were manufactured in hundreds of licensed factories, with some workers being prisoners-of-war performing forced labour. Many were produced in Nazi concentration camps.

== SS titles ==
In addition to the rank titles used by the SS, the following titles were frequently interchanged when addressing SS personnel in certain positions of authority.

- SS-Mann: A generic term for any member of the SS. Also used as an actual rank of the Allgemeine SS
- SS-Führer: Originally an early rank of the SS, the term SS-Führer designated commissioned officers of the SS and means "SS leader".
- SS-Unterführer: This term designated non-commissioned officers in the SS. An enlisted SS soldier, applying for non-commissioned officer status, was often known as an Unterführer-Anwärter.
- SD-Leiter: This title was used by senior officers of the Sicherheitsdienst, typically those in command of a major SD office or regional headquarters.
- SS- und Polizeiführer: Translated as "SS and police leader", these were some of the most powerful men in the SS, commanding all SS, Gestapo, Kripo, and Orpo units in a given geographic region, often of the size of a major military district.
- Oberster Führer der Schutzstaffel: (lit. '"Supreme Leader of the SS"'), was a special title intended to be held solely by Adolf Hitler. When the SS became an independent organisation from the SA in 1934, Hitler was listed on SS officer rolls as SS member #1 and the group's Supreme Commander. This title was intended to give Hitler a technically higher SS rank to Himmler (Reich Leader of the SS), but there is no photographic record of Hitler wearing an SS uniform, and there was no special SS insignia for Hitler above that worn by Himmler.

=== Secret police ranks ===
In addition, any SS member who also served in the Gestapo or Kripo held a unique criminal investigator rank, one of the more common of which was Kriminalrat, a police investigator's rank denoting professional detectives. Arthur Nebe, a career policeman, went by the title of Kriminalrat for most of the 1930s, only using an SS rank when engaged in non-Kripo activities. The Gestapo also maintained an entire array of ranks, which might be used interchangeably with SS rank if the agent also belonged to the SS (many did not).

== SS membership numbers ==
Adolf Hitler, as the Führer of Germany, was considered SS member #1; Emil Maurice (one of the founders of the SS) was member #2. Based on the seniority system of SS membership numbers, this made Hitler senior in the SS to all other members. The SS membership number system was also a means to denote the "old guard" of the SS, and to hold a number below 50,000 was considered a special place of honor since it denoted SS membership before the Nazi seizure of power in 1933. Numbers below 500 were considered the original cadre of the SS, while any number below fifty denoted an original founder and, in most cases, a personal associate of Hitler.

== See also ==
- Glossary of Nazi Germany
- List of SS personnel
- Ranks and insignia of the German Army (1935–1945)
- Ranks and insignia of the Nazi Party
- Ranks and insignia of the Sturmabteilung
- SS runes

== Bibliography ==
- Banach, Jens (2013). "Polizei im NS-System – Ausbildung und Rekrutierung in der Sicherheitspolizei". In Lange, Hans Jürgen (ed.). Die Polizei der Gesellschaft: Zur Soziologie der inneren Sicherheit (in German). Opladen: VS Verlag für Sozialwissenschaften. ISBN 978-3-663-09757-0.
- Beaver, Michael D. (2002). Uniforms of the Waffen-SS. Schiffer Publishing, Limited. ISBN 9780764315510.
- Bedurftig, Friedemann; Zenter, Christian, eds. (1985). The Encyclopedia of the Third Reich (in German). München: Südwest Verlag. ISBN 3-517-00834-6.
- CIA (24 August 1999). "Records Integration Title Book" (PDF). Archived from the original (PDF) on January 23, 2017.
- Cook, Stan; Bender, R. James (1994). Leibstandarte SS Adolf Hitler: Uniforms, Organization, & History. San Jose, CA: R. James Bender. ISBN 978-0-912138-55-8.
- Flaherty, T. H. (2004) [1988]. The Third Reich: The SS. Time-Life. ISBN 1-84447-073-3.
- Forbes, Robert (2010) [2006]. For Europe: The French Volunteers of the Waffen-SS. Stackpole Books. ISBN 978-0-8117-3581-0.
- Givhan, Robin (15 August 1997). "Clothier Made Nazi Uniforms". Los Angeles Times. The Washington Post.
- Hayes, A. SS Uniforms, Insignia and Accoutrements
- Kershaw, Ian (2008). Hitler: A Biography. W. W. Norton & Company. ISBN 978-0-393-06757-6.
- Laqueur, Walter; Baumel, Judith Tydor (2001). The Holocaust Encyclopedia. New Haven; London: Yale University Press. ISBN 978-0-30008-432-0.
- McNab, Chris (2009). The SS: 1923–1945. Amber Books Ltd. ISBN 978-1-906626-49-5.
- McNab, Chris (2013). Hitler's Elite: The SS 1939–45. Osprey. ISBN 978-1-78200-088-4.
- Miller, Michael (2006). Leaders of the SS and German Police, Vol. 1. San Jose, CA: R. James Bender. ISBN 978-93-297-0037-2.
- Mollo, Andrew (1992). Uniforms of the SS. Vol. 5. Sicherheitsdienst und Sicherheitspolizei 1931–1945. London: Windrow & Greene. ISBN 978-1-87200-462-4.
- Mollo, Andrew. Uniforms of the SS, Collected Edition Vol. 1–6.
- Personnel Service Records of the SS, National Archives and Records Administration, College Park, MD.
- Ruda, Adrian (2023). Der Totenkopf als Motiv. Eine historisch-kulturanthropologische Analyse zwischen Militär und Moden. Cologne: Böhlau/Brill. ISBN 978-3-412-52890-4.
- Weale, Adrian (2010). The SS: A New History. London: Little, Brown. ISBN 978-1408703045.
- Yerger, Mark (1997). Allgemeine-SS. Atglen, PA: Schiffer.
