= Sturmscharführer =

Rank in Nazi German military

- Gorget patch

- Shoulder and camo insignia
- Country: Nazi Germany
- Service branch: Schutzstaffel
- Abbreviation: Stuscha
- Formation: 1934
- Abolished: 1945
- Next higher rank: Untersturmführer
- Next lower rank: Hauptscharführer
- Equivalent ranks: Stabsfeldwebel

SS-Sturmscharführer (German: [ˈʃtʊʁmʃaːɐ̯ˌfyːʁɐ]; lit. 'Storm squad leader') was a Nazi rank of the Waffen-SS that existed between 1934 and 1945. The rank was the most senior enlisted rank in the Waffen-SS, the equivalent of a regimental sergeant major, in other military organizations.

== Rank usage ==
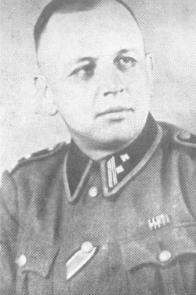
SS-Sturmscharführer Adolf Maurer

Sturmscharführer as a proper rank was unique to the Waffen-SS and was not used in the Allgemeine-SS (general-SS), where the highest enlisted rank was Hauptscharführer. Members of the Sicherheitspolizei (SiPo), when wearing the rank insignia of Sturmscharführer with police collar piping, did so when holding the equivalent police rank of Meister or the investigator's title of Kriminalsekretär. Administratively, such secret police members were not even required to be members of the SS (although many were) and thus the insignia was sometimes worn by non-SS members. Due to SS rank parity regulations, by 1943 most police members were required to hold SS rank, and those with police equivalent rank to Sturmscharführer were often administratively enlisted into the Waffen-SS in order to be ranked as a Sturmscharführer.

== History ==
The rank of Sturmscharführer was first created in June 1934, after the Night of the Long Knives. Due to a reorganization of the SS, Sturmscharführer was created as the most senior enlisted rank of the SS-Verfügungstruppe (SS-VT), replacing the older Sturmabteilung (SA) title of Haupttruppführer.

By 1941, the Waffen-SS had become the successor organization to the SS-VT and Sturmscharführer was established as the most senior enlisted rank. A Sturmscharführer was typically assigned as the head sergeant of an entire regiment or, in some cases, an infantry division.

== Insignia ==
Sturmscharführer was not the same as Stabsscharführer, which was a positional title given to the head SS non-commissioned officer of a company. The rank of Sturmscharführer was also not a prerequisite for promotion to Untersturmführer and was generally considered as a rank for "career" enlisted SS soldiers, rather than a rank on the path to becoming an officer.

The insignia for Sturmscharführer was two silver pips and two silver stripes worn on a collar patch along with the shoulder boards of a Wehrmacht Stabsfeldwebel. As was the case with Waffen-SS enlisted insignia, the collar patch of a Sturmscharführer was edged with black-and-silver twist cord until 1940 when the edging was dropped; like all non-commissioned officers the collar was bordered with 9mm silver-grey braid.

== Insignia Waffen-SS ==
Shoulder strap (insignia)

Gorget patches

SS smock insignia

Junior rank SS-Hauptscharführer	SS rank SS-Sturmscharführer	Senior rank SS-Untersturmführer

== See also ==
- Table of ranks and insignia of the Waffen-SS

== Bibliography ==
- Flaherty, T. H. (2004) [1988]. The Third Reich: The SS. Time-Life Books, Inc. ISBN 1-84447-073-3.
- Lumsden, Robin (2000). A Collector's Guide To: The Waffen–SS. Ian Allan Publishing, Inc. ISBN 0-7110-2285-2.
- McNab, Chris (2009). The SS: 1923–1945. Amber Books Ltd. ISBN 978-1-906626-49-5.
