= Obertruppführer =

Paramilitary rank of the Nazi Party

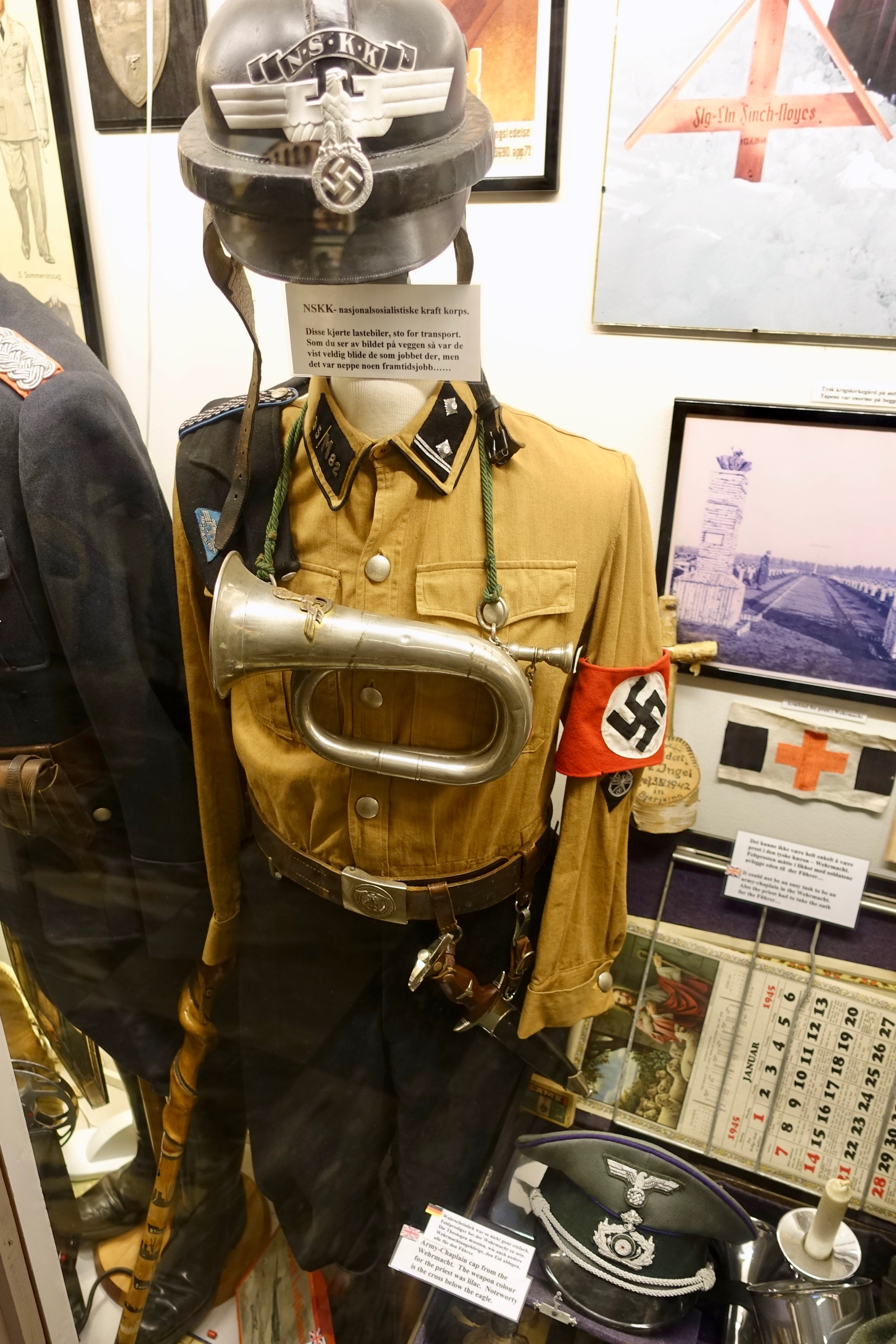
Uniform of a National Socialist Motor Corps (NSKK) Obertruppführer

Obertruppführer ([ˈoːbɐ.tʀʊp.fyːʀɐ], "senior troop leader") was a paramilitary rank of the Nazi Party that was used between the years of 1932 and 1945. The rank is most closely associated with the Sturmabteilung (SA), but also was an early rank of the Schutzstaffel (SS) in that group's formative years.

Translated as “Senior Troop Leader”, Obertruppführer traces its origins to the rank of Truppführer which was a title used by Stormtrooper Companies (Shock Troops) during the First World War. As an SA rank, Obertruppführer was created in 1932 due to the SA's expansion and growing membership. The rank of Obertruppführer was junior to Haupttruppführer and typically served as a senior non-commissioned officer rank equivalent to a Platoon Sergeant in other military organizations.

As an SS rank, Obertruppführer was used by the SS between the years of 1932 and 1934. An SS-Obertruppführer carried similar duties to their SA counterparts and the rank was also used in the very early days of the SS-Verfügungstruppe (SS-VT).

Obertruppführer was abolished as an SS rank after the Night of the Long Knives (1934), when the rank was renamed as SS-Hauptscharführer. Obertruppführer survived as a rank of the SA until the fall of Nazi Germany in 1945. The insignia for Obertruppführer consisted of two button pips and a silver stripe centered on a collar patch.

Junior Rank; Truppführer	SA rank Obertruppführer	Senior Rank; Haupttruppführer

== Insignia ==
NSFK

NSKK

OT

RAD

RBL

SA

== Bibliography ==
- McNab, Chris (2009). The SS: 1923–1945. Amber Books Ltd. ISBN 978-1-906626-49-5.
- McNab, Chris (2009b). The Third Reich. Amber Books Ltd. ISBN 978-1-906626-51-8.
