= Haupttruppführer =

Nazi Party paramilitary rank

Haupttruppführer ([ˈhaʊ̯pt.tʀʊp.fyːʀɐ], "chief troop leader") was a Nazi Party paramilitary rank that existed between the years of 1930 and 1945. Haupttruppführer was mainly used as a rank of the Sturmabteilung (SA), but was also used by the Schutzstaffel (SS) in the early days of that group's existence.

As an SA rank, Haupttruppführer was created from the much older Freikorps title of Truppführer. Haupttruppführer was considered a senior most paramilitary enlisted rank, below the first officer position of Sturmführer. A Haupttruppführer typically served as the senior non-commissioned officer of SA regiments, known as Standarten, and the rank was the approximate equivalent to sergeant major. Haupttruppführer translated as "head troop leader" and was considered senior to the rank of Obertruppführer.

Between 1930 and 1934, Haupttruppführer was also used as a rank of the SS and was held by senior SS non-commissioned officers much the same as the position was used within the SA. In 1934, Haupttruppführer was abolished as an SS rank and renamed as SS-Sturmscharführer.

The original insignia for Haupttruppführer consisted of two collar pips and a silver stripe, centered on a collar patch. After 1932, due to an expansion of both the SA and SS rank system, the insignia was modified to display two silver stripes. Some early Nazi records also refer to the rank as Trupphauptführer.

== Insignia ==
NSKK Gorget patch

OT Shoulder patch

SA Gorget patch

== See also ==
- Comparative ranks of Nazi Germany

Junior Rank; Obertruppführer	SA rank Haupttruppführer	Senior Rank; Sturmführer

== Bibliography ==
- McNab, Chris (2009). The SS: 1923–1945. Amber Books Ltd. ISBN 978-1-906626-49-5.
- McNab, Chris (2009b). The Third Reich. Amber Books Ltd. ISBN 978-1-906626-51-8.
