= Truppführer =

Nazi Party paramilitary rank

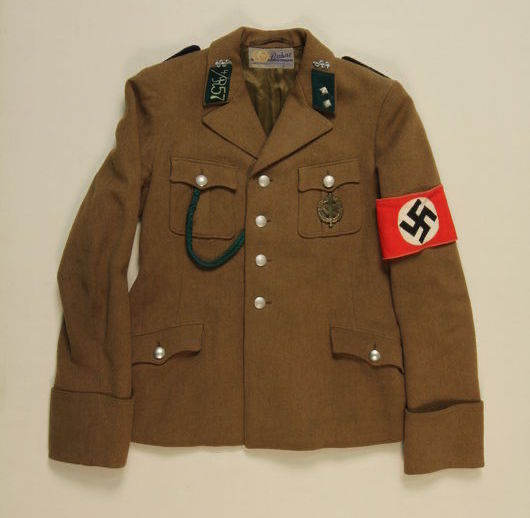
Jacket of an SA Truppführer, 1930s

Truppführer ([ˈtʀʊp.fyːʀɐ], "troop leader") was a Nazi Party paramilitary rank that was first created in 1930 as a rank of the Sturmabteilung (SA). Translated as "Troop Leader", the rank of Truppführer evolved from early Freikorps titles which traced their origins to World War I.

As an SA rank, Truppführer was considered the equivalent of a senior sergeant, or sergeant first class. The rank of SA-Truppführer was at first considered senior to that of SA-Scharführer, but after 1932 was ranked above the new rank of SA-Oberscharführer. The insignia for a basic Truppführer consisted of two button pips on a collar patch.

A Truppführer normally served as the SA-non-commissioned officer of platoon sized SA-Truppen, formed into company sized SA-Sturm. The responsibilities of a Truppführer typically increased upon promotion to Obertruppführer and Haupttruppführer, as did the number of troops under the Truppführer’s command.

Between 1930 and 1934, Truppführer was also used as an SS rank but was abolished after the Night of the Long Knives when the rank of SS-Truppführer was renamed SS-Oberscharführer.

Junior Rank; Oberscharführer	SA rank Truppführer	Senior Rank; Obertruppführer

== Insignia ==
NSFK

NSKK

OT

RAD

SA

== Bibliography ==
- McNab, Chris (2009). The SS: 1923–1945. Amber Books Ltd. ISBN 978-1-906626-49-5.
- McNab, Chris (2009b). The Third Reich. Amber Books Ltd. ISBN 978-1-906626-51-8.
