= Bastable Theatre =

Theatre in Syracuse, New York

Coordinates: 43°3′1″N 76°9′2″W

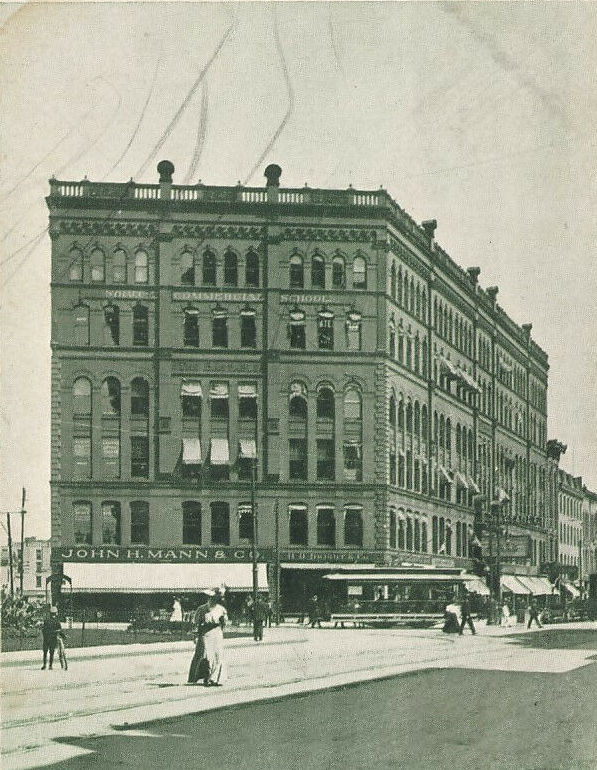
The Bastable Theatre pictured in 1907

The Bastable Theatre was a theatre in the Bastable Block of downtown Syracuse, New York, from 1893 till its destruction by fire in 1923. Erected by Frederick Bastable over the foundation of a former theatre on the site, it saw the emergence of Sam S. Shubert, who began his theatre management there in 1897. He and his brothers Lee and Jacob subsequently established The Shubert Organization, which became a major theatre owner.

During Shubert's early years of management, he competed with the city's Wieting Opera House, which was controlled by The Theatrical Syndicate. The Bastable hosted a number of touring companies in the city and became known for presenting stock companies and melodramas.

The State Tower Building, Syracuse's tallest then and now, was constructed on the site in 1928.

== Description ==
The Bastable Block was six stories, with offices in addition to the theatre, which had two balconies and two boxes on each side.

== History ==
The area where the theatre was constructed was occupied by the Bastable block, which had been standing since at least 1852. The original block was four stories tall and housed the Shakespeare Hall and arcade. It burnt down on November 20, 1891.

The Bastable Theatre was built by Frederick Bastable in 1893, at a reported cost of $50,000. Designed by Archimedes Russell, it incorporated portions of the walls from the old block that were still standing. In competition with the established Wieting Opera House and Grand Opera House, it opened on October 10 that year, managed by Frank D. Hennessay. The first show was Beau Brummell starring Richard Mansfield. It was generally unprofitable for the first four years, with an early success coming with twice showing the 1897 film The Corbett-Fitzsimmons Fight, first shortly after the March 17 bout, and again in October.

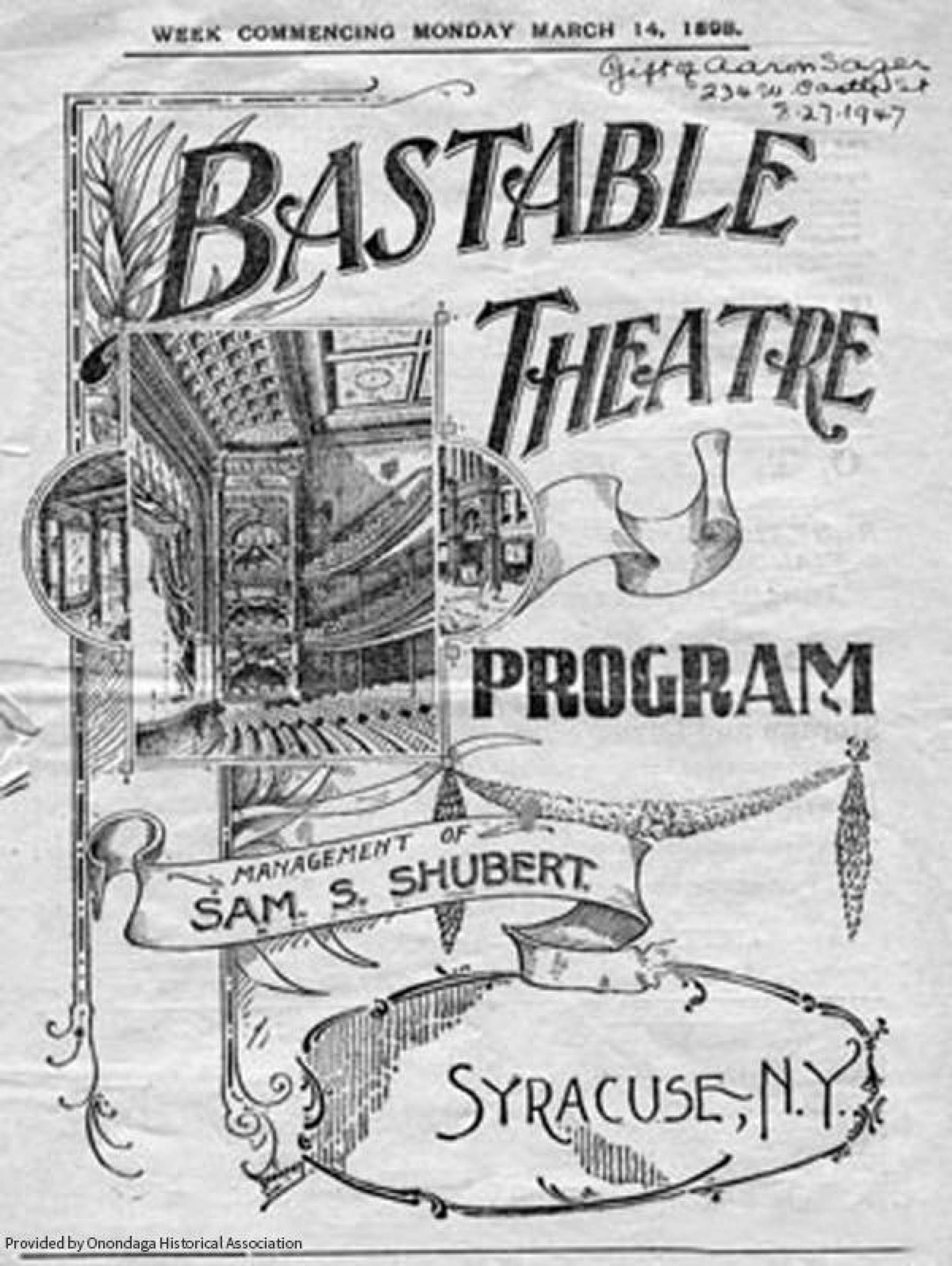
Bastable Theatre 1894 program

Sam S. Shubert took over management on December 14, 1897. Competing with The Theatrical Syndicate-controlled Wieting, Shubert initially booked "an old-fashioned stock company in old-fashioned plays at old-fashioned prices." The following year, he diversified the theatre, a move coupled with renovation, and exclusively booked touring shows. The Wieting had a virtual monopoly on the biggest names and shows, so Shubert focused on booking a variety of sensational shows and comedies. He began the season with a performance of A Stranger in New York by Charles H. Hoyt. Shubert showed films by the American Biograph Company to great success beginning in January 1898.

The theatre was finally successful and profitable, and the Shubert family began leasing both the Bastable and the city's Grand Opera House. They quickly expanded across New York state. The Shuberts created The Shubert Organization, which became a major theatre owner and operator. The Bastable grew to be known for hosting stock companies and melodramas. In 1902 Hurtig & Seamon became managers. By 1908 they were succeeded by Syracuse's General Amusement Company.

=== 1923 fire ===
By 1923 the Bastable Block had about 150 tenants. On February 12, the theatre caught fire and burned down. The fire was noted around 5:30 pm, but the top of the building was engulfed in flame before effective firefighting could begin. Although efforts were focused on rescuing people, three died, and damages totaled $1.5 million. The Bastable block was virtually completely razed. Syracuse revised its fire response policies in the fire's aftermath. Several months after burning down, the owner of the block announced construction of a new office building on the lot. It became the State Tower Building, then and still Syracuse's tallest building.

== Bibliography ==
- Beauchamp, William Martin (1908). Past and Present of Syracuse and Onondaga County, New York: From Prehistoric Times to the Beginning of 1908. S.J. Clarke Publishing Company.
- Hirsch, Foster (1998). The Boys from Syracuse: The Shuberts' Theatrical Empire. SIU Press. ISBN 978-0-8093-2156-8.
- McNamara, Brooks (1990). The Shuberts of Broadway : a history drawn from the collections of the Shubert Archive. New York : Oxford University Press. ISBN 978-0-19-506542-8.
