= Shubert Foundation =

American private foundation

- Sam S. Shubert Foundation
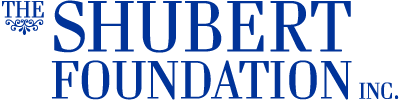
- Named after: Sam S. Shubert
- Formation: 1945; 81 years ago
- Founders: Lee Shubert & Jacob J. Shubert
- Founded at: New York City
- Type: Private
- Legal status: Foundation
- Chairman: Robert E. Wankel
- President: Diana Phillips
- Publication: The Passing Show
- Subsidiaries: The Shubert Organization
- Website: www.shubertfoundation.org

The Sam S. Shubert Foundation is an American private foundation founded in 1945 by Jacob J. Shubert and Lee Shubert in honor of their brother Sam S. Shubert (1878–1905).

== Description ==
The Shubert Foundation owns The Shubert Organization. It currently owns and operates 23 theaters, including 17 Broadway venues. It is America's largest funder of not-for-profit theaters, dance companies, and similar. It hosts the annual Shubert Foundation High School Theatre Festival for New York City Public Schools. Diana Phillips is the president of the organization. In June 2024, the foundation announced $40 million in annual grants. As of 2023, the foundation had approximately $670 million in assets.
