= Academy of Music (Milwaukee) =

Former theater in Milwaukee, Wisconsin

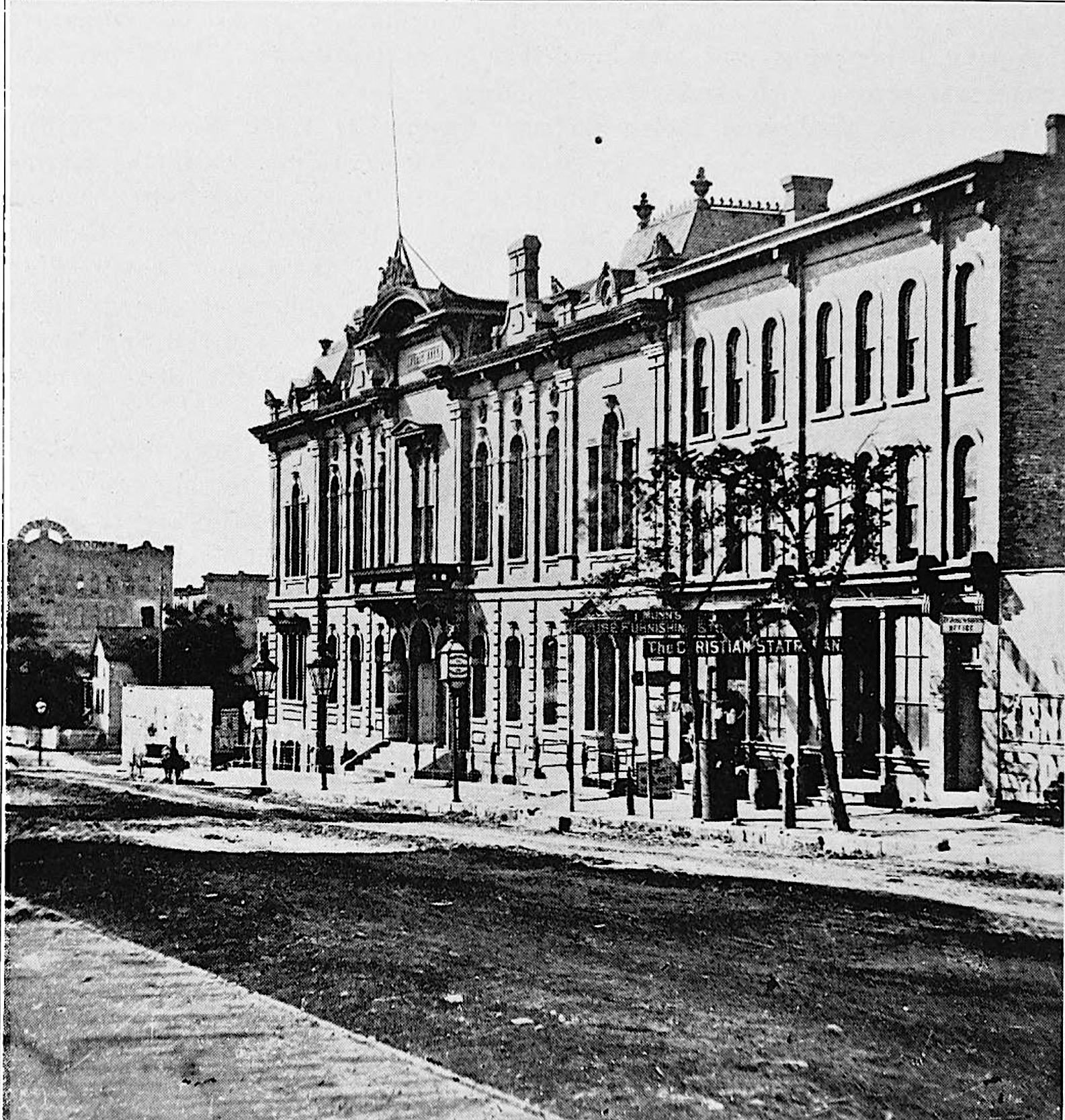
1870 image of the Academy of Music in Milwaukee.

Academy of Music was a theater in Milwaukee, Wisconsin located at what is today 611–625 N. Milwaukee Street. Built in 1864–1865, the theatre opened as Music Hall on January 31, 1865. Its name was changed to the Academy of Music four years later. In the 19th century it operated as Milwaukee's primary venue for opera and concerts. It was later leased by the Shubert family and re-branded the Shubert Theatre in 1906. It continued as a venue for plays as part of The Shubert Organization until 1922 when it briefly operated as an unsuccessful movie theatre before closing. It was converted into a retail and office space building known as the Pioneer Building, opening under that name in May 1926. It was acquired by Levin Properties, Inc. in 2000. Levin unsuccessfully attempted to repurpose that building as a center for telecommunications in the early 2000s. It was subsequently acquired by Milwaukee Nowi LLC, and demolished in 2012 to make way for the Milwaukee Marriott Downtown hotel.

== History ==
The Academy of Music was built by the Milwaukee Musical Society (MMS) to replace their earlier performance venue, Albany Hall, which was destroyed by fire in March 1862. Located on Milwaukee Street between Wisconsin St and Michigan St, the cornerstone for the building was laid on October 22, 1864 at the time of the American Civil War. The property had previously been the site of Old Young's Hall which had stood there until an 1860 fire.

Opening as Music Hall, the theatre was inaugurated on January 31, 1865 with a performance of Felix Mendelssohns oratorio St. Paul performed by the MMS. At the time it was largest theatre in the Midwestern United States. Its stage was 36 feet deep and it sat 1400 people. Its name was changed to the Academy of Music in 1869. During the 19th century the theatre was regularly visited by touring opera companies from Europe and various American concert companies. In 1882 it became the first theater in Milwaukee to install electric lighting.

Edwin Thanhouser ran a repertory troupe of actors out of the Academy of Music whose personnel included actors Edgar Baume, Edith Evelyn, Lee Baker, Albert Brown, Grace May Lamkin, Riley Chamberlain, and the famous mimic Charlotte Parry. In November 1905 it was announced that Thanhouser was in talks with Shubert family to bring a production to the theatre. In December 1905 J. J. Shubert visited Milwaukee, and after viewing the theatre took over its lease. A remodel of the theater was begun in January 1906, and the theatre was re-named the Shubert Theatre. The newly named theatre re-opened on February 11, 1906 with a production of Grace L. Furniss's The Man on the Box starring Henry E. Dixey. In 1920 it was announced that the Shubert Theatre was likely to be sold following negotiations between competing theatre organizations on the national scene. Charles A. Niggemeyer managed a stock theatre troupe, the Shubert Stock Company, in the latter part of the theater's history. The company was still actively engaged at the theatre in 1921. In 1922 the theatre was briefly converted into a cinema under Niggemeyer, but was poorly received, and the Shubert Theatre closed.

Architects Gustav E. Kahn and Benjamin Zelonsky were hired to convert the theatre into a building used for commercial and office space. It re-opened as the Pioneer Building (PB) on May 1, 1926. The repurposed structure was utilized by a variety of businesses, including retail. One of the businesses was the Colony Inn, a restaurant and antique shop with employees in American Colonial-era costumes. The PB was the home of The Wisconsin Jewish Chronicle from 1926 to 1938. In the 1930s the building housed an art studio operated by the Federal Art Project. In mid 20th century the local branch of the Girl Scouts of the USA had its headquarters in the PB.

On September 23, 1986, the building was added to the National Register of Historic Places as part of the East Side Commercial Historic District. It was later at to Wisconsin's State Register of Historic Places (administered by the Wisconsin Historical Society) on January 1, 1989.

In 2000 the PB was acquired by Levin Properties, Inc.; an organization which rebranded the building Pioneer Technology Center and retooled it as a "building dedicated to telecommunications and internet connectivity". Despite attempts at attracting telecommunications companies to the building after significant infrastructure alterations, the fallout from the dot-com bubble impacted finding a tenant and ultimately it all came to nothing despite several potential opportunities. By 2011 the building had been acquired by Milwaukee Nowi LLC who also purchased several adjacent buildings with the intent of razing the structures, including the PB, to make was for the Milwaukee Marriott Downtown hotel. The building was demolished to make way for that hotel; construction of which began in 2012.

== Bibliography ==
- Bruce, William George, ed. (1922). History of Milwaukee, City and County, Volume 1. S. J. Clarke Publishing Company.
