= The Shubert Organization =

Theatrical producer and theatre owner

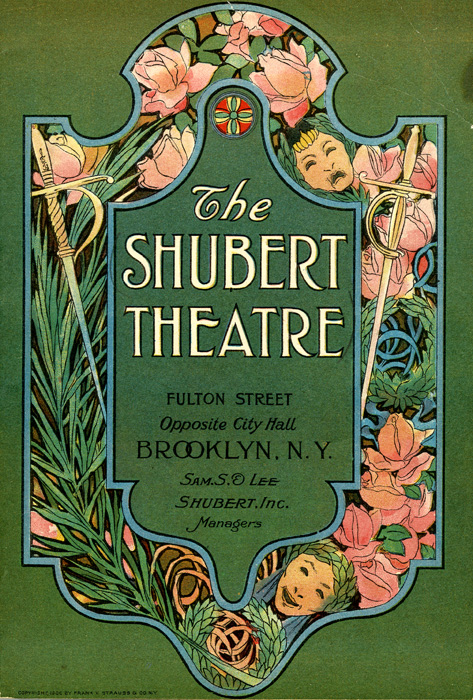
- Type: Organization
- Industry: Theatre
- Founded: 1900
- Founder: Sam S., Jacob J. and Lee Shubert
- Key people: The Shuberts (Founders); Robert E. Wankel (Chairman and CEO), 2020–
- Owner: Shubert Foundation
- Website: shubert.nyc

The Shubert Organization is a theatrical producing organization and a major owner of theatres based in Manhattan, New York City. It was founded by the three Shubert brothers — Lee, Sam, and Jacob J. Shubert — in the late 19th century. They steadily expanded, owning many theaters in New York and across the United States. Since then it has gone through changes of ownership, but it is still a major theater chain.

== History ==
The Shubert Organization was founded by the Shubert brothers, Sam S. Shubert, Lee Shubert, and Jacob J. Shubert of Syracuse, New York – colloquially and collectively known as "The Shuberts" – in the late 19th century in upstate New York, entering into New York City productions in 1900. The organization produced a large number of shows and began acquiring theaters. Sam Shubert died in 1905; by 1916 the two remaining brothers had become powerful theater moguls with a nationwide presence.

In 1907, the Shuberts tried to enter vaudeville with the United States Amusement Co. In the spring of 1920 they made another attempt, establishing the Shubert Advanced Vaudeville with Lee Shubert as President and playing two shows per day in Boston, Dayton, Detroit, Cleveland, Chicago, Philadelphia and in September 1921 opening in New York.

In April 1922, the Shuberts teamed with Isidore Herk and E. Thomas Beatty formed the Affiliated Theatres Corporation, which would book shows for the chain. Faced with fierce competition from the B. F. Keith Circuit, the Shuberts closed their vaudeville operation in February 1923.

By 1929, the Shubert Theatre chain included Broadway's most important venues, the Winter Garden, the Sam S. Shubert, and the Imperial theaters, and owned, managed, operated, or booked nearly a thousand theaters nationwide. The company continued to produce stage productions in New York until the 1940s, returning to producing Broadway productions in the 1970s after a hiatus.

The company was reorganized in 1973, and as of 2016 owned or operated seventeen Broadway theaters in New York City, two off-Broadway theaters — Stage 42 and New World Stages — and the Forrest Theatre in Philadelphia. It leases Boston's Shubert Theatre to the Citi Performing Arts Center.

The organization's Shubert Ticketing division, which includes the Telecharge service, handles tickets for 70 theaters.

Several former Shubert-owned theaters across the United States are still referred to by the Shubert name. One of the most famous is the New Haven Shubert, the second theater ever built by the Shubert Organization. Until the 1970s, major Broadway producers often premiered shows there before opening in New York. It was immortalized in many mid-20th century films, such as All About Eve.

Another important regional theater was the Shubert in Chicago, Illinois, located within the Majestic Building at 22 West Monroe Street. Originally known as the Majestic Theatre, the Shubert Organization purchased it in 1945 and rechristened it the "Sam Shubert Theatre". The Shuberts sold the theatre to the Nederlander Organization in 1991 and is now known as the CIBC Theatre.

In 2016, it sold its longtime headquarters at 1700 Broadway to Ruben Cos for $280 million.

== Theatres ==
=== Broadway theatres ===
- Ambassador Theatre
- Ethel Barrymore Theatre
- Belasco Theatre
- Booth Theatre
- Broadhurst Theatre
- Broadway Theatre
- John Golden Theatre
- Imperial Theatre
- Bernard B. Jacobs Theatre
- James Earl Jones Theatre
- Longacre Theatre
- Lyceum Theatre
- Majestic Theatre
- Music Box Theatre
- Gerald Schoenfeld Theatre
- Shubert Theatre
- Winter Garden Theatre

=== Off-Broadway theatres ===
- Stage 42
- New World Stages

=== Regional theatres ===
- Forrest Theatre (Philadelphia)
- Shubert Theatre (Boston)

=== Other properties ===
- Sardi's
- Auditorium at Axa Equitable Center

== Former theatres ==
=== Broadway ===
- Avon Theatre
- Adelphi Theatre (1944–1970)
- Bijou Theatre
- Casino Theatre (from 1903)
- Central Theatre (1918–1988)
- Century Theatre
  - Century Theatre Roof
- Comedy Theatre (1909–1931)
- Cosmopolitan Theatre
- Maxine Elliott Theatre (1906–1956)
- Forrest Theatre (1925–1945)
- 44th Street Theatre (1912–1945)
  - Nora Bayes Theatre (on roof)
- 49th Street Theatre
- 46th Street Theatre (1935–1945)
- Sam H. Harris Theatre
- Herald Square Theatre (1900–?)
- Hippodrome Theatre (1906-1915)
- Jolson's 59th Street Theatre
- Lyric Theatre (1903–?)
- Madison Square Theatre
- Majestic Theatre (Columbus Circle)
- Manhattan Center (1911–1922)
- Morosco Theatre
- National Theatre (?-1956)
- New Century Theatre
- Princess Theatre (29th St) (1902–1907)
- Ritz Theatre (1921–1956)
- St. James Theatre (1941–1957)
- Waldorf Theatre (Fiftieth Street, East of Broadway)

=== Subway Circuit ===
- Bronx Opera House, Bronx
- Grand Opera House, Brooklyn
- Riviera Theatre, Manhattan
- Shubert Majestic Theatre, Brooklyn
- Teller's Shubert Theatre, Brooklyn

=== Regional ===
- Harmanus Bleecker Hall (Albany)
- Capitol Theatre (Albany)
- Auditorium Theatre (Baltimore)
- Boston Opera House (Boston)
- Colonial Theatre (Boston) (?-1957)
- Columbia Theatre (Boston) (1903–1904)
- Majestic Theatre (Boston) (1903–1956)
- Plymouth Theatre (Boston) (1927–1957)
- Wilbur Theatre (Boston)
- Teck Theatre (Buffalo)
- Blackstone Theatre (Chicago) (1948–1989)
- Erlanger Theatre (Chicago)
- Garrick Theater (Chicago) (1903–?)
- Great Northern Theatre (Chicago)
- Olympic Theatre (Chicago)
- Princess Theatre (Chicago)
- Grand Opera House (Chicago)
- Shubert Theatre (Chicago) (1945–1991)
- Cox Theatre (Cincinnati)
- Shubert Theatre (Cincinnati)
- Colonial Theatre (Cleveland)
- Hanna Theatre (Cleveland)
- Cass Theatre (Detroit) (1926–1962)
- Garrick Theatre (Detroit)
- Shubert-Lafayette Theatre (Detroit) (1925–1957)
- Parsons Theatre (Hartford)
- Murat Theatre (Indianapolis)
- Shubert Theatre (Kansas City)
- Shubert's Missouri Theatre (Kansas City)
- Shubert Theatre (Los Angeles) (1972–2002)
- Shubert Theatre (Milwaukee)
- Shubert Theatre (Newark)
- Shubert Theatre (New Haven) (1914–1941)
- Adelphi Theatre (Philadelphia)
- Chestnut Street Opera House (Philadelphia)
- Locust Theatre (Philadelphia) (?-1956)
- Lyric Theatre (Philadelphia)
- Shubert Theatre (Philadelphia) (1918–1957)
- Walnut Street Theatre (Philadelphia) (1941–1969)
- Providence Opera House (Providence)
- Shubert Theater (Saint Paul) (1910–1933)
- Alvin Theatre (Pittsburgh)
- Duquesne Theatre (Pittsburgh)
- Pitt Theatre (Pittsburgh)
- Baker Theatre (Rochester) (1899–?)
- Cook Opera House (Rochester) (1898–1899)
- Curran Theatre (San Francisco)
- Garrick Theatre (St. Louis)
- Shubert Theatre (St. Louis)
- Bastable Theatre (Syracuse) (1897–?)
- Grand Opera House (Syracuse)
- Wieting Opera House (Syracuse)
- Town Hall Theatre (Toledo) (1945–1953)
- Royal Alexandra Theatre (Toronto)
- Rand Opera House (Troy, New York)
- Majestic Theatre (Utica)
- Belasco Theatre (Washington, D.C.)
- Poli's Theatre (Washington, D.C.)
- Shubert Theatre (Washington, D.C.)
- Shubert-Garrick Theater (Washington, D.C.)
- National Theatre (Washington, D.C.) (1980–2012)
- Playhouse Theatre (Wilmington, Delaware)

=== London ===
- Waldorf Theatre (1905–1909)

== See also ==
- Shubert family
