= Shubert Theatre (Broadway) =

Broadway theater in Manhattan, New York

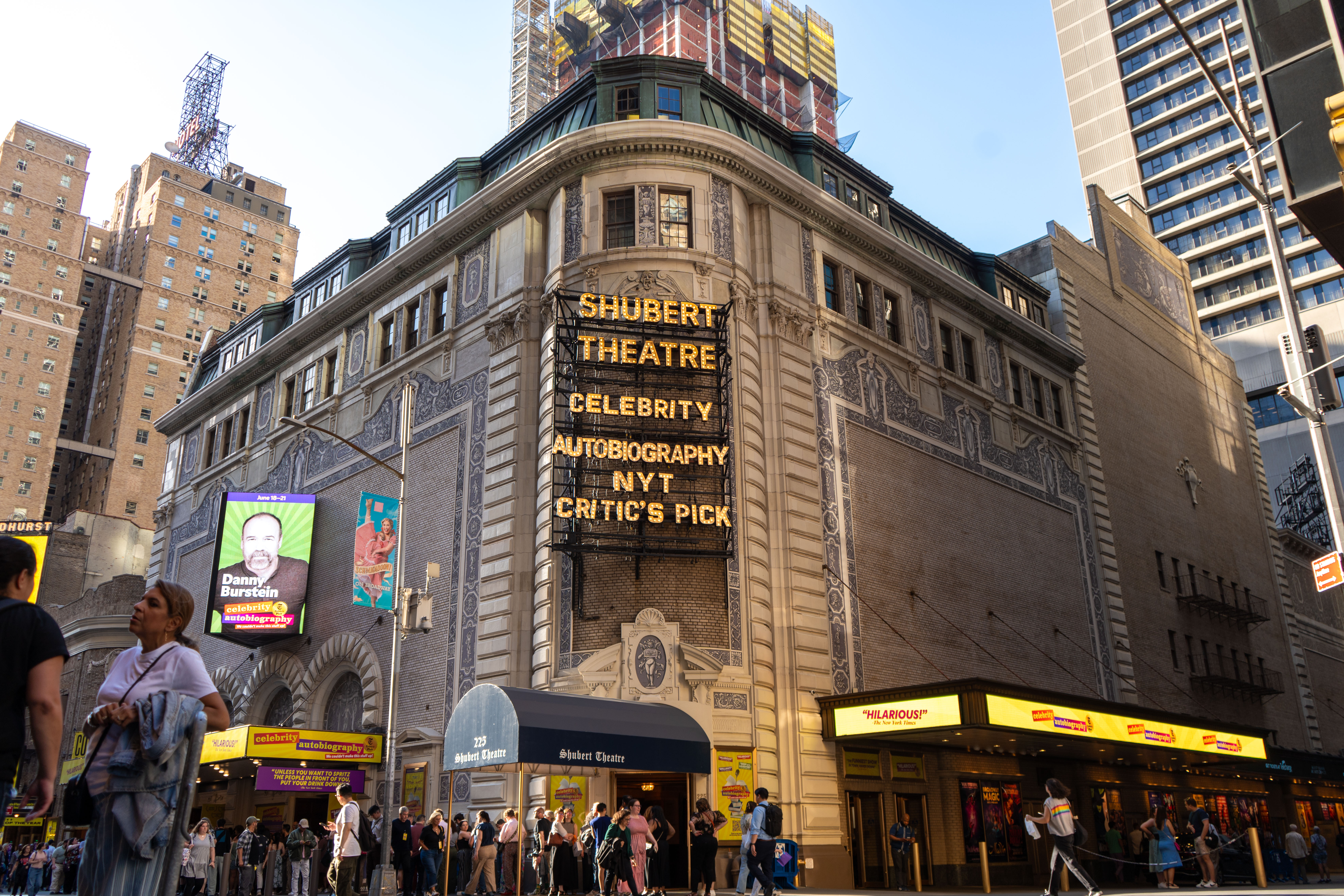
- The Shubert Theatre in June 2026
- Interactive map of Shubert Theatre
- Address: 225 West 44th Street; Manhattan, New York; United States
- Coordinates: 40°45′29″N 73°59′14″W
- Owner: Shubert and Booth Theatre, LLC
- Operator: The Shubert Organization
- Capacity: 1,502
- Type: Broadway
- Public transit: Subway: Times Square–42nd Street/Port Authority Bus Terminal

Construction
- Opened: October 2, 1913 (113 years ago)
- Architect: Henry Beaumont Herts

Website
- Official website

New York City Landmark
- Designated: December 15, 1987
- Reference no.: 1378
- Designated entity: Facade

New York City Landmark
- Designated: December 15, 1987
- Reference no.: 1379
- Designated entity: Lobby and auditorium interior

The Shubert Theatre is a Broadway theater at 225 West 44th Street in the Theater District of Midtown Manhattan in New York City, New York, U.S. Opened in 1913, the theater was designed by Henry Beaumont Herts in the Italian Renaissance style and was built for the Shubert brothers. Lee and J. J. Shubert had named the theater in memory of their brother Sam S. Shubert, who died in an accident several years before the theater's opening. It has 1,502 seats across three levels and is operated by The Shubert Organization. The facade and interior are New York City landmarks.

The Shubert's facade is made of brick and terracotta, with sgraffito decorations designed in stucco. Three arches face south onto 44th Street, and a curved corner faces east toward Broadway. To the east, the Shubert Alley facade includes doors to the lobby and the stage house. The auditorium contains an orchestra level, two balconies, and a flat ceiling. The space is decorated with mythological murals throughout. Near the front of the auditorium, flanking the elliptical proscenium arch, are box seats at balcony level. The upper levels contain offices formerly occupied by the Shubert brothers, and the stage house to the north is shared with the Booth Theatre.

The Shubert brothers developed the Booth and Shubert theaters as their first venues on the block. The Shubert Theatre opened on October 2, 1913, with a revival of Hamlet. The theater has hosted numerous long-running musicals throughout its history, such as Bells Are Ringing and Promises, Promises. Since the 1970s, the Shubert has hosted long runs of the musicals A Chorus Line, Crazy for You, Chicago, Spamalot, Memphis, and Matilda the Musical.

== Site ==
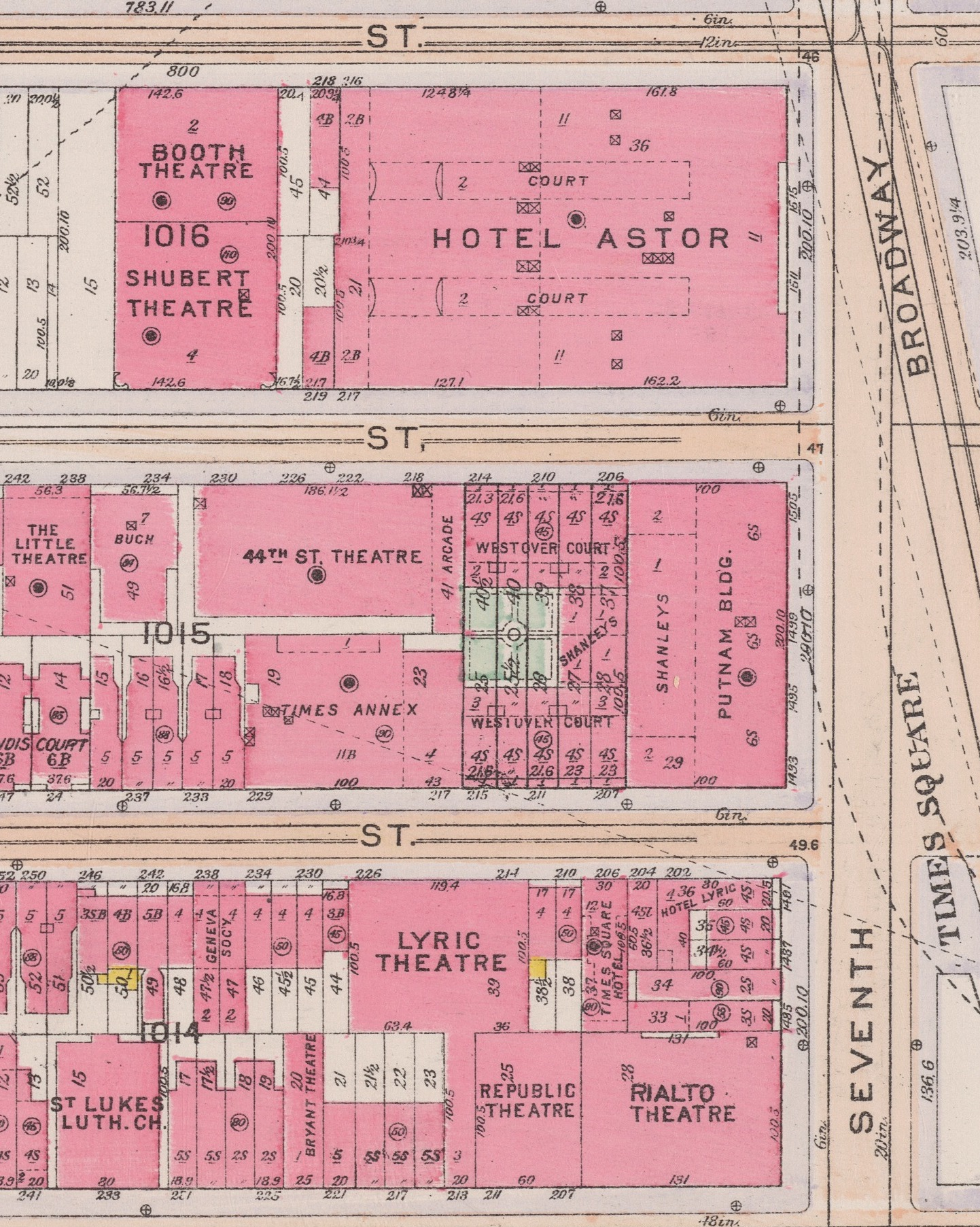
Drawing of the theater's site in 1916. The Shubert and Booth theaters are at upper left.

The Shubert Theatre is on 225 West 44th Street, on the north sidewalk between Eighth Avenue and Seventh Avenue, near Times Square in the Theater District of Midtown Manhattan in New York City, New York, U.S. It shares a land lot with the Booth Theatre directly to the north, though the theaters are two separate buildings. The lot covers 25,305 square feet (2,350.9 m^{2}), with a frontage of 126 feet (38 m) on 44th and 45th Streets and 200.83 feet (61 m) on Shubert Alley to the east. The Shubert Theatre building takes up 110 feet (34 m) of the Shubert Alley frontage and measures about 110 feet wide on 44th Street.

The Shubert is part of the largest concentration of Broadway theaters on a single block. It adjoins six other theaters: the Majestic and Broadhurst to the west; the John Golden, Bernard B. Jacobs, and Gerald Schoenfeld to the northwest; and the Booth to the north. Other nearby structures include the Row NYC Hotel to the west; the Music Box Theatre and Imperial Theatre one block north; One Astor Plaza to the east; 1501 Broadway to the southeast; Sardi's restaurant to the south; and the Hayes Theater and St. James Theatre to the southwest. The Broadhurst, Schoenfeld (originally Plymouth), Booth, and Shubert theaters were all developed by the Shubert brothers between 44th and 45th Streets, occupying land previously owned by the Astor family. The Shuberts bought the land under all four theaters from the Astors in 1948.

The Shubert and Booth theaters were developed as a pair and are the oldest theaters on the block. The site was previously occupied by several houses on 44th and 45th Street. The adjacent Shubert Alley, built along with the Shubert and Booth theaters, was originally a 15-foot-wide (4.6 m) fire escape passage. Shubert Alley's presence not only allowed the theaters to meet fire regulations but also enabled the structures to be designed as corner lots. Originally, the theaters faced the Hotel Astor, now the location of One Astor Plaza, across the alley. Another private alley runs to the west, between the Booth/Shubert and Broadhurst/Schoenfeld theaters. The Broadhurst and Schoenfeld were also built as a pair, occupying land left over from the development of the Shubert and Booth; these too are designed with curved corners facing Broadway.

== Design ==
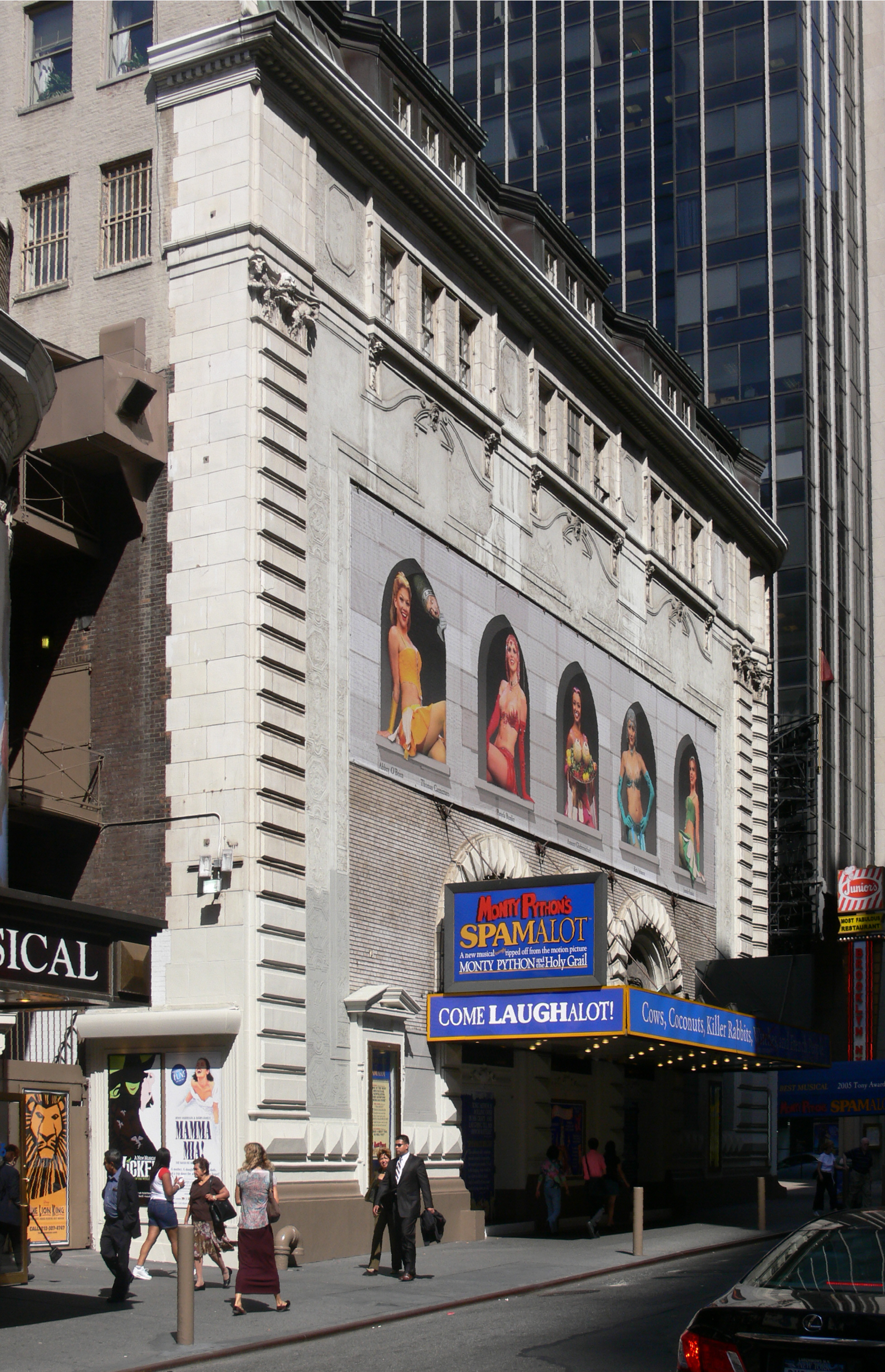
44th Street facade, 2007

The Shubert Theatre was designed by Henry Beaumont Herts and constructed in 1913 for the Shubert brothers. Herts was an experienced theatrical architect and had previously led the firm of Herts & Tallant, which designed such theaters as the Lyceum, the New Amsterdam, and the Liberty. The Shubert and Booth theaters are within separate buildings and differ in their interior designs and functions, although they have adjacent stage areas near the center of the block. The Shubert was the larger house, intended to be suitable for musicals, and the Shubert family's offices were placed above the auditorium there. By contrast, the Booth was intended to be smaller and more intimate. The Shubert Theatre is operated by The Shubert Organization.

=== Facade ===
The facades of the two theaters are similar in arrangement, being designed in the Italian Renaissance style or the Venetian Renaissance style. The structures both have curved corners facing Broadway, since most audience members reached the theaters from that direction. The Shubert's facade is made of white brick, laid in English-cross bondwork, as well as terracotta. The bricks are laid in alternating courses of headers (with their short sides exposed) and stretchers (with their long sides exposed). An early source described the theaters' facades as being made of white marble, with stucco and faience panels. The main section of the theater rises six stories and is topped by a cornice with dentils. Above the cornice is a sheet-metal mansard roof. A critic for Architecture magazine wrote that Herts had "discovered an excellent motive for a single facade", although it "would perhaps have been more amusing" if the two theaters had contained different facades.

According to the New-York Tribune, the theaters' use of hand-carved sgraffito for decoration made Herts "the first man to have used sgraffito for this purpose". The sgraffito was used because of New York City building codes that prevented decorations from projecting beyond their lot lines. These decorations were colored light-gray, placed on a purple-gray background. The sgraffito on the two theaters is one of the few such examples that remain in New York City. A contemporary source said the theaters' facades were "free from much of the gaudy trappings that has made some of the recent playhouses commonplace in appearance".

==== 44th Street ====
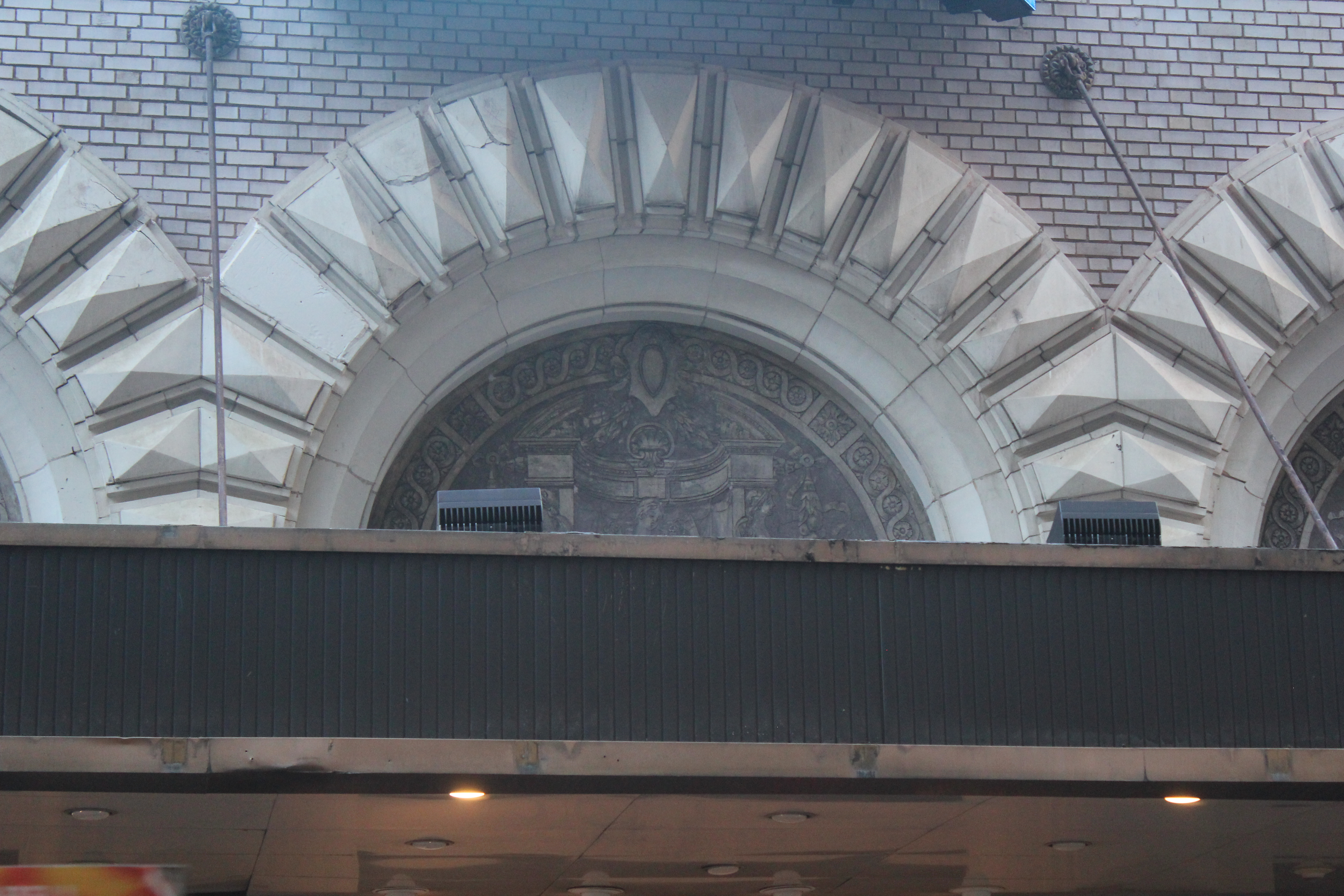
Arches above the doors

At ground level, the 44th Street elevation contains a tall water table of painted stone, above which is a band with rusticated blocks of terracotta. There are three arches at the center of the facade, which provide an emergency exit from the lobby. Each archway originally contained a pair of paneled wooden double doors, but these have since been replaced with glass doors. On either side of the arches are rectangular sign boards topped by triangular pediments. Within the archways above the doors are sgraffito paintings, which depict figures within aedicules. These paintings are partially obscured by a modern marquee that is cantilevered from the wall above. The archways are surrounded by rusticated voussoirs.

Above the archways, the theater's facade is made of brick. The brick section of the facade is surrounded by a stucco band of sgraffito decorations, which is painted white and contains bas reliefs of classical-style foliate ornamentation. Outside this stucco band is another sgraffito band, divided into panels that depict female figures and griffins. The extreme left (west) and right (east) ends of the facade contain vertical sequences of terracotta quoins; they have Corinthian-style capitals that are decorated with motifs of rams, lions' heads, and acanthus leaves. At the top of the brick wall, the paneled sgraffito band is split up into three sections, each with a curved broken pediment and carvings of masks. Above each pediment is a set of triple windows at the sixth story, surrounded by a terracotta frame. Each triple window contains a window sill, which projects outward slightly and is supported by corbels that depict winged heads. Octagonal terracotta panels separate each set of triple windows. The mansard roof has three sets of dormer windows on this elevation.

==== Southeast corner ====
Due to the theater's location at the corner of 44th Street and Shubert Alley, the southeast corner of the facade is curved. This corner section has a doorway at the center, containing glass-and-metal doors; these are shielded by a canopy that extends to the curb on 44th Street. There are stone pilasters on either side of the doorway, which contain cartouches and sign boards. Above the doors is a broken pediment shaped like a segmental arch. The center of the broken pediment has an oval sgraffito panel with scrolls on the sides and a scalloped shell above it. The panel depicts a figure that carries a sign with the words "Henry B. Herts, Architect 1913".

A brick wall rises from the doorway, and a sign board is mounted on the wall. The brick is surrounded by a stucco band with sgraffito foliate decorations, which retains its original colors. Like on 44th Street, there are vertical quoins with Corinthian capitals on the left and right. At the top of the brick wall, there is a broken pediment, within which is a theatrical mask and a shield. This broken pediment is topped by a pair of windows at the sixth story, surrounded by a terracotta frame. The windows share a slightly projecting sill, which is supported by corbels that depict winged heads.

==== Shubert Alley ====
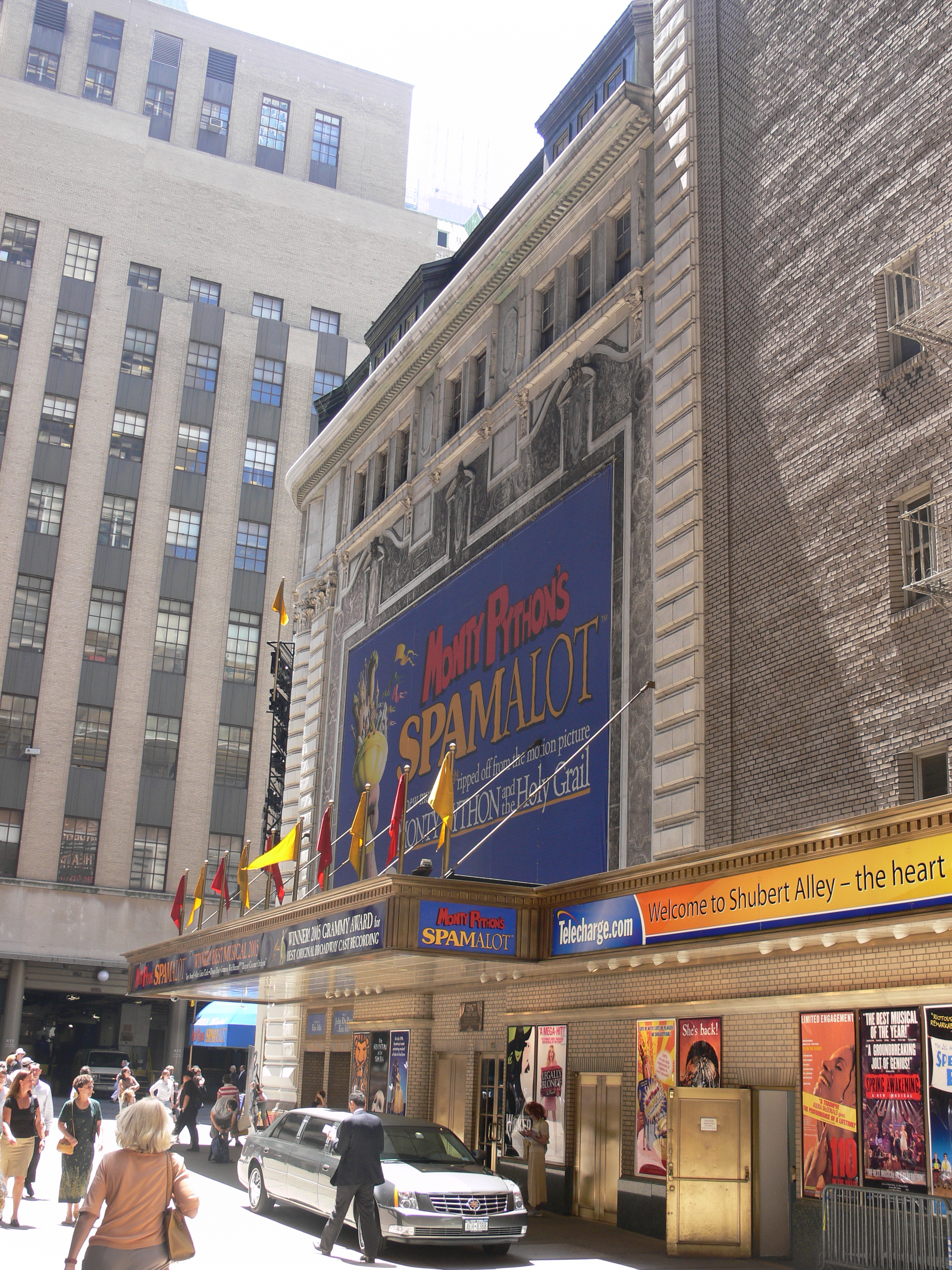
Shubert Alley facade, 2007

On Shubert Alley, the facade is divided into the auditorium to the left (south) and the stage house to the right (north). The auditorium section contains three sets of glass-and-metal doors: two from the auditorium, on the left, and one leading to the Shuberts' upper-story offices, on the right. A metal marquee hangs over these doors. Like the elevations on 44th Street and at the southeast corner, the left side of the auditorium facade contains vertical quoins topped by a Corinthian capital. Also similar to the 44th Street elevation, there is a brick wall section above the first floor, surrounded by a stucco sgraffito band with bas-reliefs and a paneled sgraffito band. At the top of the brick wall are three broken pediments and three sets of windows surrounded by terracotta frames. The main difference from the 44th Street elevation is that the center set of windows contains two openings rather than three, and there is no roof dormer above the center windows.

The stage house section, shared with the Booth Theatre to the north, is simpler in design, being made mainly of brick in English cross bond. The ground floor has doorways, metal panels, and sign boards. A band of quoins separates the stage house from the Shubert auditorium to the left and the Booth Theatre to the right. The second to fourth floors have one-over-one sash windows, while the fifth floor has a terracotta shield at the center. The top of the stage house contains a parapet, above which is a sgraffito panel surrounded by bricks.

=== Interior ===
==== Lobby ====
The lobby is composed of an elliptical space, accessed from the southeast corner of the theater, and a rectangular space, accessed from two of the doors on Shubert Alley. The north wall of the lobby contains ticket windows, while the west wall contains doors to the auditorium. Originally, the space was described as an elaborate green-marble room accessed by heavy oak doors. The marble mosaic-tile floor is decorated with foliate patterns. At the top of the walls is a frieze depicting waves and talons, as well as a cornice with modillions. The rectangular section of the lobby contains a vaulted ceiling, which is split into multiple sections by moldings. There is an octagonal panel. surrounded by laurel leaves, at the center of the vault. The elliptical section of the lobby has a domed ceiling decorated with moldings and laurel leaves.

==== Auditorium ====
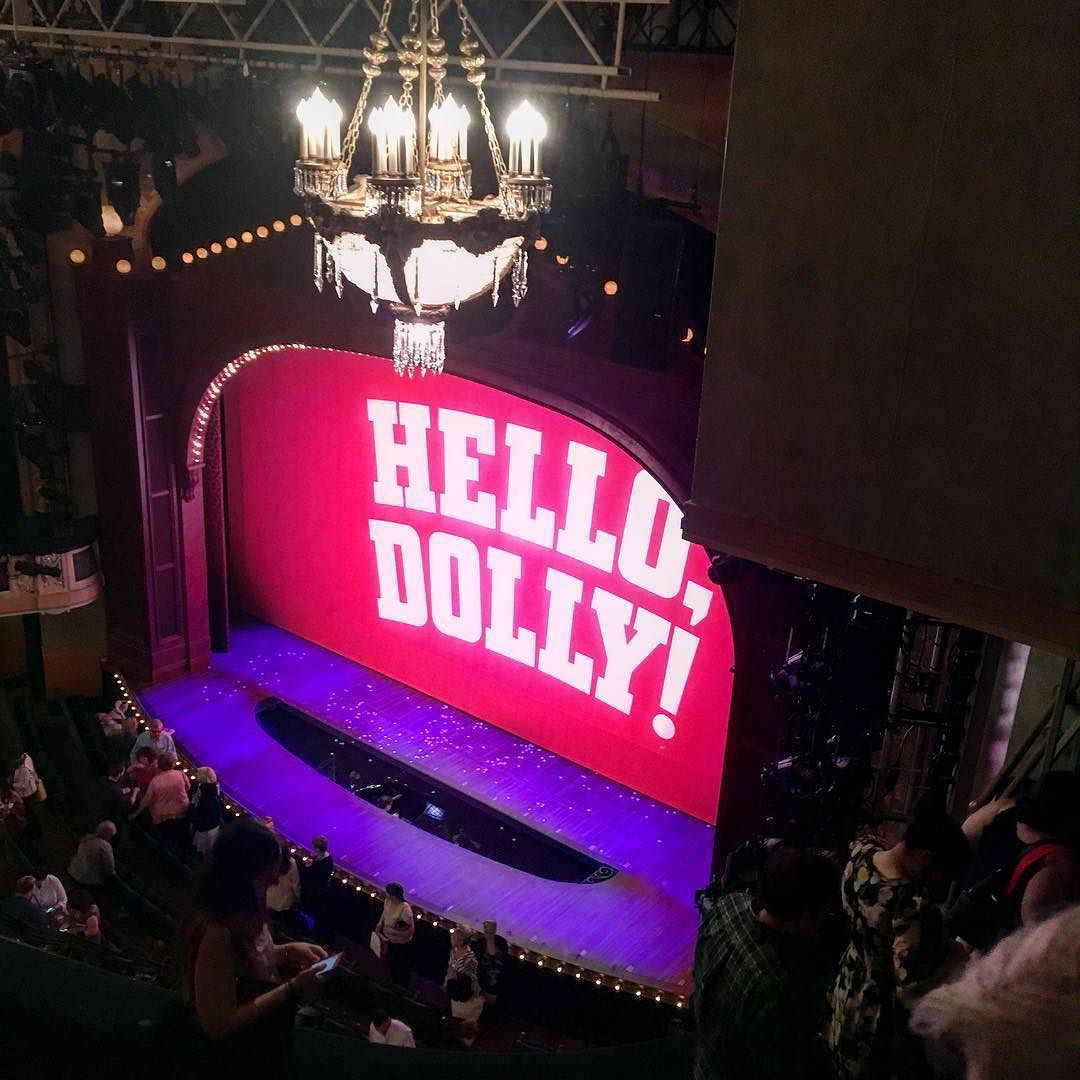
View from the balcony toward the stage

The auditorium has an orchestra level, two balconies, boxes, and a stage behind the proscenium arch. The auditorium is wider than its depth, and the space is designed with plaster decorations in relief. According to the Shubert Organization, the theater has 1,502 seats; meanwhile, The Broadway League gives a figure of 1,460 seats and Playbill cites 1,435 seats. The physical seats are divided into 700 seats in the orchestra, 410 on the mezzanine/first balcony, 350 on the second balcony, and 16 in the boxes. There are 26 standing-only spots, as well as 28 removable seats in the orchestra pit. The theater contains restrooms in the basement, mezzanine, and balcony. The orchestra level is wheelchair-accessible, but the restrooms and other seating levels are not. The theater originally had a capacity of 1,400 seats.

The New York Times described the decorative scheme as originally being "old Venetian gold, absinthe green, and amethyst". Mythological motifs are heavily featured in the interior. J. Mortimer Lichtenauer painted murals along the boxes, the area above the proscenium arch, and the ceiling. The murals contain figures with masks of Minoan and renaissance inspiration, as well as semi-nude females depicting music and drama. There were twenty-one figures; a contemporary publication said the murals had been completed in "a little less than two days". Architecture magazine cited the Shubert's interior as being "good of the more accepted theatre interior design", despite not being of "such exceptional excellence" as the neighboring Booth.

===== Seating areas =====
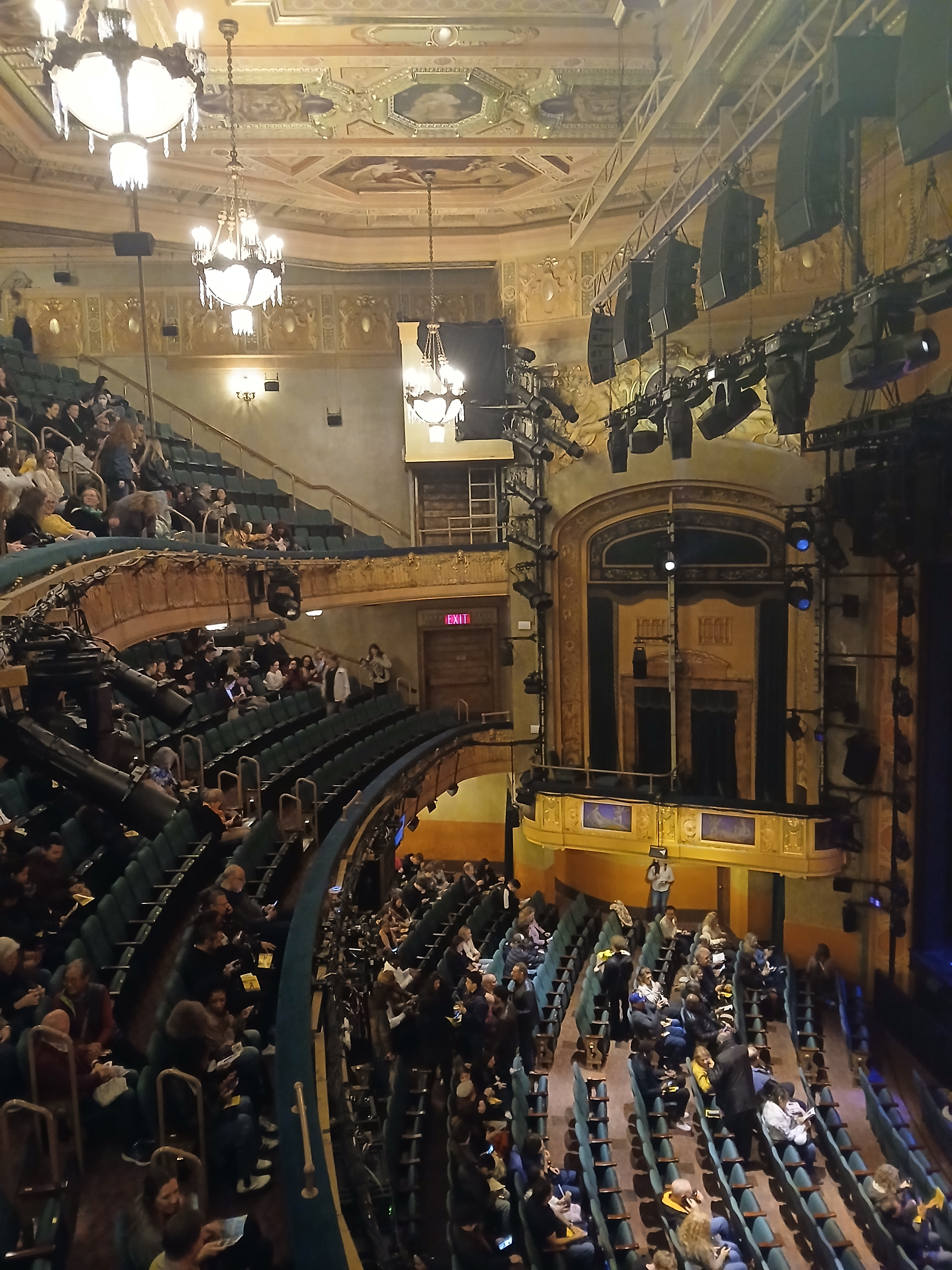
View of the left-hand box from the right side of the balcony

The rear or southern end of the orchestra contains a promenade measuring 15 feet (4.6 m) deep. Four piers, topped by plain capitals, support the mezzanine level and separate the promenade from the orchestra seating. The top of the orchestra promenade's walls contain a frieze with phoenixes and foliate decorations; several niches with arched pediments are placed within the frieze. The ceiling is a barrel vault, split into multiple sections by moldings; it contains an octagonal panel at the center. There are also lighting sconces and a standing rail in the orchestra promenade. Stairs in the promenade lead up to the mezzanine and balcony. The orchestra level is raked, sloping down toward an orchestra pit in front of the stage. The orchestra has paneled plasterwork side walls with fabric coverings, as well as lighting sconces.

The mezzanine and balcony are both steeply raked. The rear of the mezzanine contains a promenade, similar to that on the orchestra. The underside of the mezzanine contains moldings and foliation, which surround murals that depict classical scenes. In front of the mezzanine and the balcony are plasterwork panels with swags and theatrical masks; the balcony's front rail is covered by light boxes. The side walls of both the mezzanine and the balcony contain plasterwork panels with fabric coverings; a shallow cornice separates the mezzanine from the balcony. There are doorways on both levels, above which are friezes with scroll decorations. Two of the doorways on the balcony have panels that depict swags and shields. A frieze runs above the balcony, wrapping above the boxes and proscenium. There is a technical booth at the rear of the balcony.

On either side of the stage is a splayed wall section, which includes an elliptical arch with one box at the mezzanine level. Similar boxes were installed on the orchestra level but have since been removed. The front railings of the boxes contain motifs of scallops and swags, while the undersides are decorated with scrolled brackets and foliate panels. The archways themselves are mostly filled with paneled plaster walls, with a doorway leading into each box. The doorways have eared surrounds, and the tops of the doorways contain rectangular panels with light fixtures. The archways are surrounded by coved bands with urns and foliate decorations. Above these arches are murals with swags, foliate decorations, and female figures, surrounded by a band of foliate decorations. The boxes were decorated in "old Venetian gold", while the paintings above were predominantly colored "absinthe green and amethyst".

===== Other design features =====
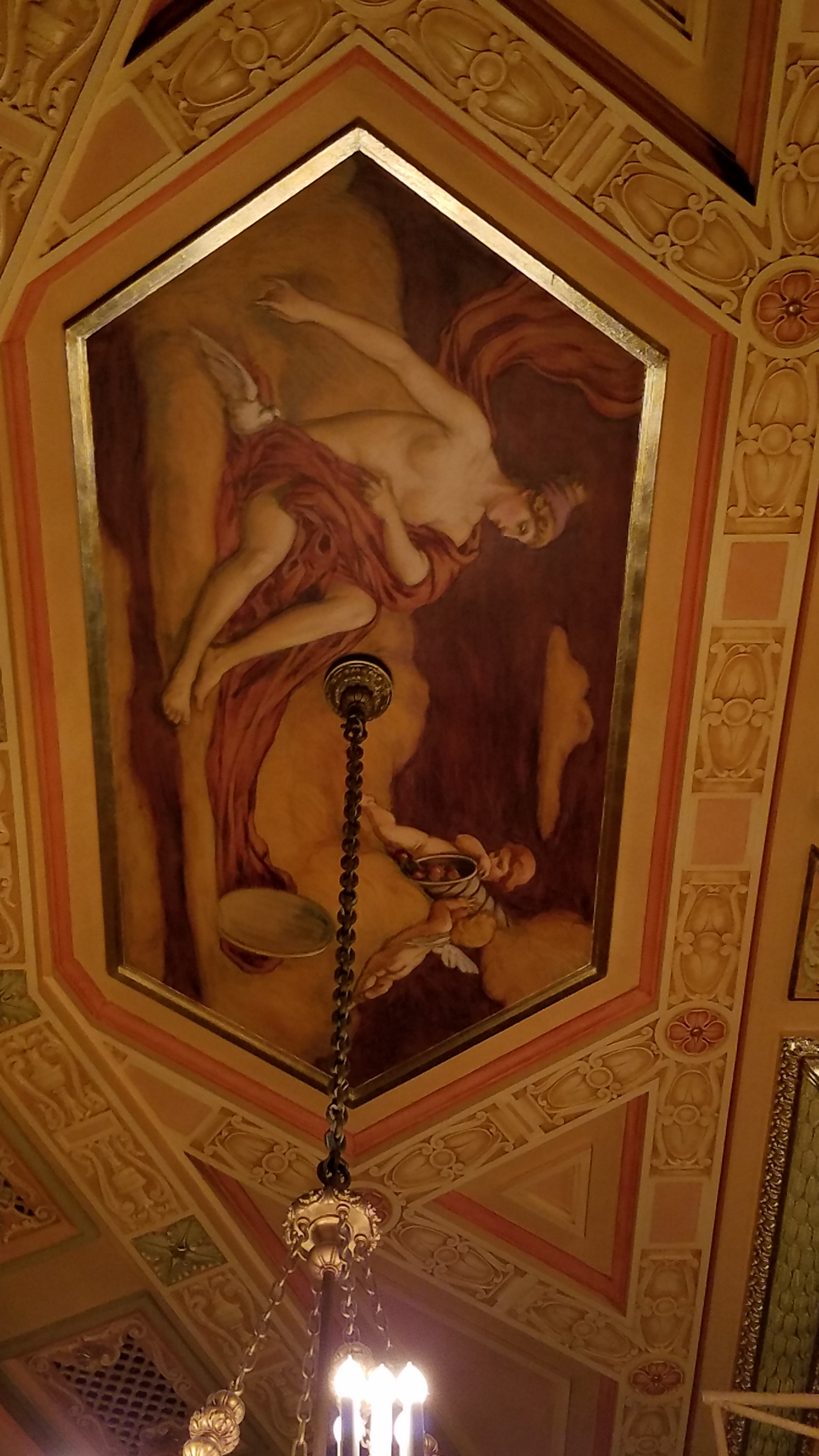
Ceiling detail

Next to the boxes is a coved, segmental proscenium arch. The coved section has octagonal panels, which are separated either by fan motifs or by sunbursts and foliate decorations. The proscenium opening measures about 38 feet 9 inches (11.81 m) wide and 28 feet 6 inches (8.69 m) tall. Above the proscenium arch is an octagonal panel containing a mural. On either side of the mural are female representations of music and drama, surrounded by a band of foliate decorations. A frieze also runs above the proscenium; it depicts female figures alternating with shields and winged figures. The depth of the auditorium to the proscenium is 33 feet 10 inches (10.31 m), while the depth to the front of the stage is 36 feet (11 m). The stage itself was described as being 35 feet (11 m) deep and 80 feet (24 m) wide behind the proscenium. The stage lighting was controlled by a switchboard, placed on a terrace to one side of the stage.

The flat ceiling is hexagonal in shape, split into sections by molded bands. There is a square panel at the center of the ceiling, surrounded by hexagonal panels that contain murals. The central panel is itself divided into sections, with smaller panels that surround a square section; the mural in the central square has been removed. Six chandeliers hang from the ceiling: two above the orchestra and four above the second balcony. The ceiling contains air-conditioning vents, as well as a suspended truss.

==== Other interior spaces ====
The dressing rooms are separated from the stages of each theater by a heavy fireproof wall. The two theaters are separated from each other by a 2-foot-thick (0.61 m) wall. A gift shop called One Shubert Alley opened between the Shubert and Booth theaters in 1979, within three of the Booth's former dressing rooms. The emergency exits of both theaters were composed of "fire- and smoke-proof towers" rather than exterior fire escapes.

===== Shubert offices =====
The top two stories were designed as offices for the Shuberts. Lee Shubert had a circular office on the third floor, facing the street, which he occupied until his death in 1953. His younger brother Jacob J. Shubert, also known as J. J., had a three-room office in the rear of the third floor. Lee often referred to the third and fourth stories as "my offices", implying J. J.'s subordinate position in the firm. There were also offices for casting directors, secretaries, and telephone operators; a kitchen and dining room; a bedroom; and a bathroom. The Shubert offices had a large safe for storing money, in the days when the theatrical industry operated mainly as a cash business, though this was subsequently converted to a storage area for drinks. By 1926, when Lee and J. J.'s relationship became strained, J. J. had moved to Sardi's restaurant, while Lee remained atop the Shubert Theatre.

Following Lee's death, his office was occupied by his nephew Milton Shubert, who quit in 1954 after an acrimonious dispute with J. J. regarding who should lead the Shubert family's theaters. The law firm of Schoenfeld & Jacobs, headed by Gerald Schoenfeld and Bernard B. Jacobs, occupied the Shubert Theater offices for free in the 1970s. Jacobs occupied Lee Shubert's suite until his death in 1996. For several decades, producer Alexander H. Cohen also had offices in the Shubert Theatre and was known as the "third Shubert", despite conflicting with Jacobs and Schoenfeld over rent in the mid-1980s. By the theater's 100th anniversary in 2013, Lee's former dining room had been divided into offices for Shubert president Robert E. Wankel and chairman Philip J. Smith.

== History ==
Times Square became the epicenter for large-scale theater productions between 1900 and the Great Depression. Manhattan's theater district had begun to shift from Union Square and Madison Square during the first decade of the 20th century. From 1901 to 1920, forty-three theaters were built around Broadway in Midtown Manhattan, including the Shubert Theatre. The venue was developed by the Shubert brothers of Syracuse, New York, who expanded downstate into New York City in the first decade of the 20th century. After Sam S. Shubert died in a railroad accident in 1905, his brothers Lee and J. J. expanded their theatrical operations significantly. Sam had been 26 years old at the time of his death. His brothers decided to construct five theaters across the United States in his honor, all named the Sam S. Shubert Memorial Theatre. The Shuberts later dropped the word "memorial" from these theaters' names, citing the word's "unpleasant connotation".

=== Development and early years ===
==== Construction ====
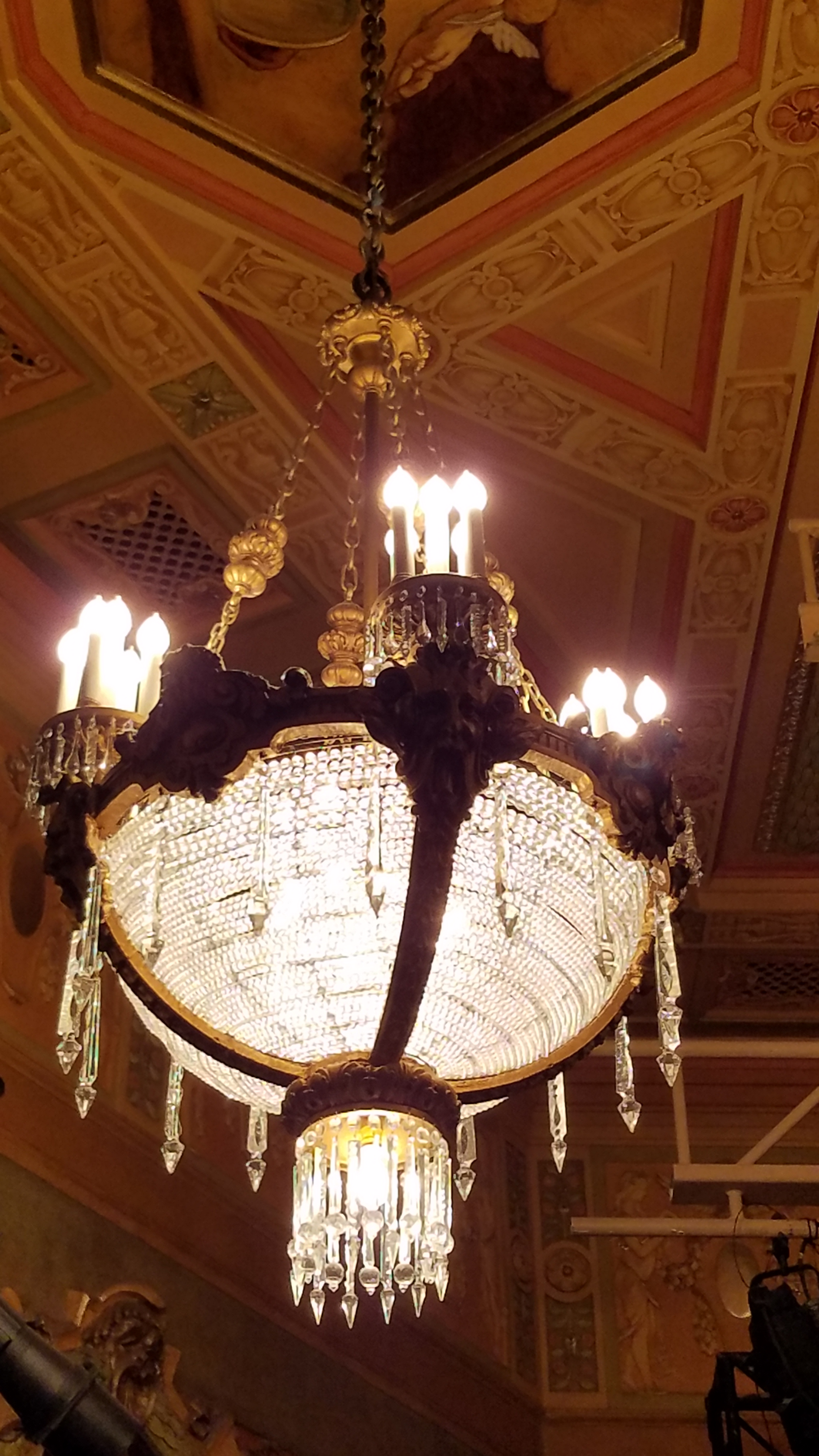
Detail of a chandelier in the theater

As the Shuberts were developing theaters in the early 1910s, theatrical producer Winthrop Ames was planning to build a replacement for the New Theatre. Though the New had been completed in 1909, Ames and the theater's founders saw the venue, on the Upper West Side, as being too large and too far away from Times Square. The New Theatre's founders acquired several buildings at 219–225 West 44th Street and 218–230 West 45th Street in March 1911, for the construction of a "new New Theatre" there. The theater would have contained a private alley to the east. The project was canceled in December 1911, after the site had been cleared, when Ames announced he would build the Little Theatre (now the Hayes Theater) across 44th Street. The New Theatre's founders cited the difficulty of finding a director for the new New Theatre, as well as possible competition with Ames's Little Theatre.

In April 1912, Winthrop Ames and Lee Shubert decided to lease the site of the new New Theatre from the Astor family. Two theaters would be built on the site, along with a private alley to their east. Shubert's theater was to be the larger of the venues, being on 44th Street, while Ames's theater would be on 45th Street and would have a smaller seating capacity. The larger theater was known as the Sam S. Shubert Theatre, in memory of Lee's late brother, while the smaller one was named after actor Edwin Booth.

Documents indicate that several architects were consulted for the theaters' design, including Clarence H. Blackall, before the Shuberts hired Henry B. Herts for the job. An "ice palace" was also planned on the site now occupied by the Broadhurst and Schoenfeld theaters. Work on the two theaters started in May 1912. The next month, the new-building application for the New Theatre (which had been filed in 1911) was withdrawn, and two new-building applications for Shubert's and Ames's theaters were filed. Herts began accepting bids for construction contractors that July, and the Fleischmann Bros. Company was selected the following month to construct both of the new theaters. The project encountered several delays and disputes over costs. Documents indicate that the Fleischmann Bros. had expressed concerns of imprecise drawings and fired several workers. Further delays occurred when Ames requested several changes to the Booth's design in mid-1912; Herts said this would require the plans to be completely redone, while J. J. Shubert believed the changes were superficial. The Fleischmann Bros. warned that the delays could set back the project further, as the sgraffito ornament could not be installed during winter.

==== Opening and initial productions ====
By August 1913, British actor Johnston Forbes-Robertson and his wife Gertrude Elliott had announced their plans to open the new Shubert Theatre with a season of plays in repertory. The New-York Tribune reported that Forbes-Robertson's appearance would "establish a dramatic precedent of the highest order". The first event at the new Shubert Theatre was a reception for Forbes-Robertson on September 29, 1913, with Julia Marlowe, Augustus Thomas, and DeWolf Hopper making speeches. Three days later, on October 2, the theater officially opened with a revival of Hamlet, starring Forbes-Robertson. (Note: According to theatrical historian Ken Bloom, alternate opening dates of September 29, October 28, and September 3 are listed. However, contemporary media refer to the Forbes-Robertson reception being on September 29 and the first show on October 2.) This coincided with the opening of Shubert Alley, which was first used during Hamlet's intermission. At the theater's opening, Lee Shubert said, "In using for this new theatre the name of Sam S. Shubert, we consecrate it in the most solemn manner we know." At the time, there were just two other theaters on the surrounding blocks: the Little Theatre and the now-demolished Weber and Fields' Music Hall.

The Forbes-Robertson Repertory Company's productions included Shakespeare plays, as well as other works such as George Bernard Shaw's play Caesar and Cleopatra. The first original production at the Shubert was the Percy MacKaye play A Thousand Years Ago, which premiered in January 1914. Next came the theater's first musical, The Belle of Bond Street with Gaby Deslys and Sam Bernard, which closed after a short run. A revival of George du Maurier's play Trilby opened at the theater in 1915. Later that year, the Shubert hosted its first major success: the Franz Lehár operetta Alone at Last. Herbert J. Krapp, who subsequently designed numerous theaters for the Shubert family, designed a canopy on the Shubert Theatre's facade in 1915.

Jerome Kern's musical Love O' Mike, featuring Clifton Webb and Peggy Wood, opened at the Shubert in 1917. The Sigmund Romberg operetta Maytime opened later that year, featuring Wood and Charles Purcell; its success prompted the Shuberts to simultaneously stage the production at the 44th Street Theatre. This was followed in 1918 by the drama The Copperhead with Lionel Barrymore, as well as the Rudolf Friml musical Sometime with Francine Larrimore, Mae West, and Ed Wynn. The musicals Good Morning Judge and The Magic Melody both had several-month-long runs at the Shubert in 1919, and Julia Marlowe and E. H. Sothern presented a four-week-long program of Shakespeare plays later that year.

=== 1920s and 1930s ===
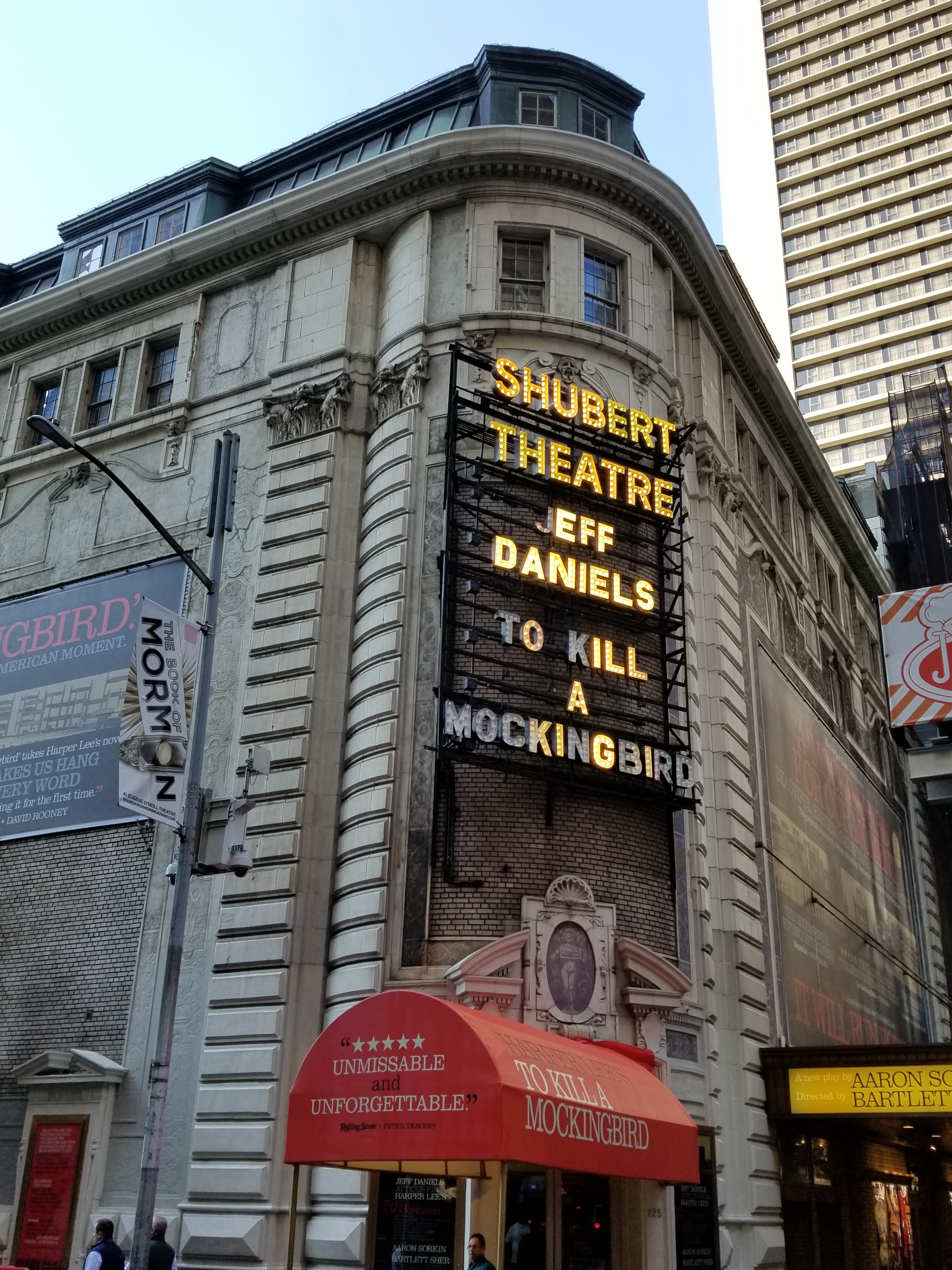
Curved corner of the facade

The Shubert hosted the drama The Blue Flame with Theda Bara in 1920, followed the next year by the play The Trial of Joan of Arc with Margaret Anglin. The Shubert also hosted several revues in the mid-1920s, including four editions of the Greenwich Village Follies and the 1923 edition of Artists and Models.

Besides these revues, Shubert Theatre premiered the musical Red Pepper (1922) which was one of the earliest musicals to feature a jazz rooted score, and in 1924 it premiered The Magnolia Lady with Ralph Forbes and Ruth Chatterton; though both had relatively brief runs. The Shakespeare play Othello with Walter Hampden opened at the theater in 1925, followed the same year by the revue Gay Paree with Charles "Chic" Sale. Next, Emmerich Kálmán's operetta Countess Maritza opened at the Shubert in 1926 and was highly popular. Further hits arrived in 1927 with the musical Yours Truly, featuring Leon Errol, and the revue Padlocks of 1927, with Texas Guinan and Lillian Roth.

Zoe Akins's play The Furies with Laurette Taylor was a flop in 1928, and Ups-a-Daisy had a short run the same year, with the then-little-known actor Bob Hope in the cast. The revue A Night in Venice and the musical The Street Singer both were staged the next year. Subsequently, Fritz Leiber's Chicago Civic Shakespeare Company came to the Shubert in 1930, presenting three plays in repertory. Walter Slezak had his musical debut the same year in Meet My Sister. The musical Everybody's Welcome opened the next year with Ann Pennington, Ann Sothern, Oscar Shaw, and Frances Williams; Sothern, then known as Harriette Lake, had her musical debut in that show. The revue Americana opened at the theater in 1932. This was followed the next year by Gay Divorce, with Fred Astaire and Claire Luce; this was Astaire's last appearance in a Broadway musical.

For the next several years, the Shubert hosted a series of straight plays (as opposed to musicals). Among these was Sidney Howard's play Dodsworth, which opened in February 1934 and featured Fay Bainter and Walter Huston; the show took a brief hiatus in mid-1934 and continued for several months afterward. This was followed in 1936 by Robert E. Sherwood's Idiot's Delight, featuring theatrical couple Alfred Lunt and Lynn Fontanne. The play, the first show at the Shubert to be awarded the Pulitzer Prize for Drama, ran for a year. Next was Maxwell Anderson's The Masque of Kings, featuring Dudley Digges, Leo G. Carroll, Henry Hull, and Margo, which opened in 1937 and was a flop. The same year, the Shubert saw the Rodgers and Hart musical Babes in Arms, as well as the Theatre Guild production Amphitryon 38 with Lunt and Fontanne. The Rodgers and Hart musical I Married an Angel opened in 1938, featuring Vera Zorina. The next year, the Theatre Guild hosted the play The Philadelphia Story at the Shubert, featuring Katharine Hepburn; it saved the Guild from bankruptcy and ran for 417 performances.

=== 1940s and 1950s ===
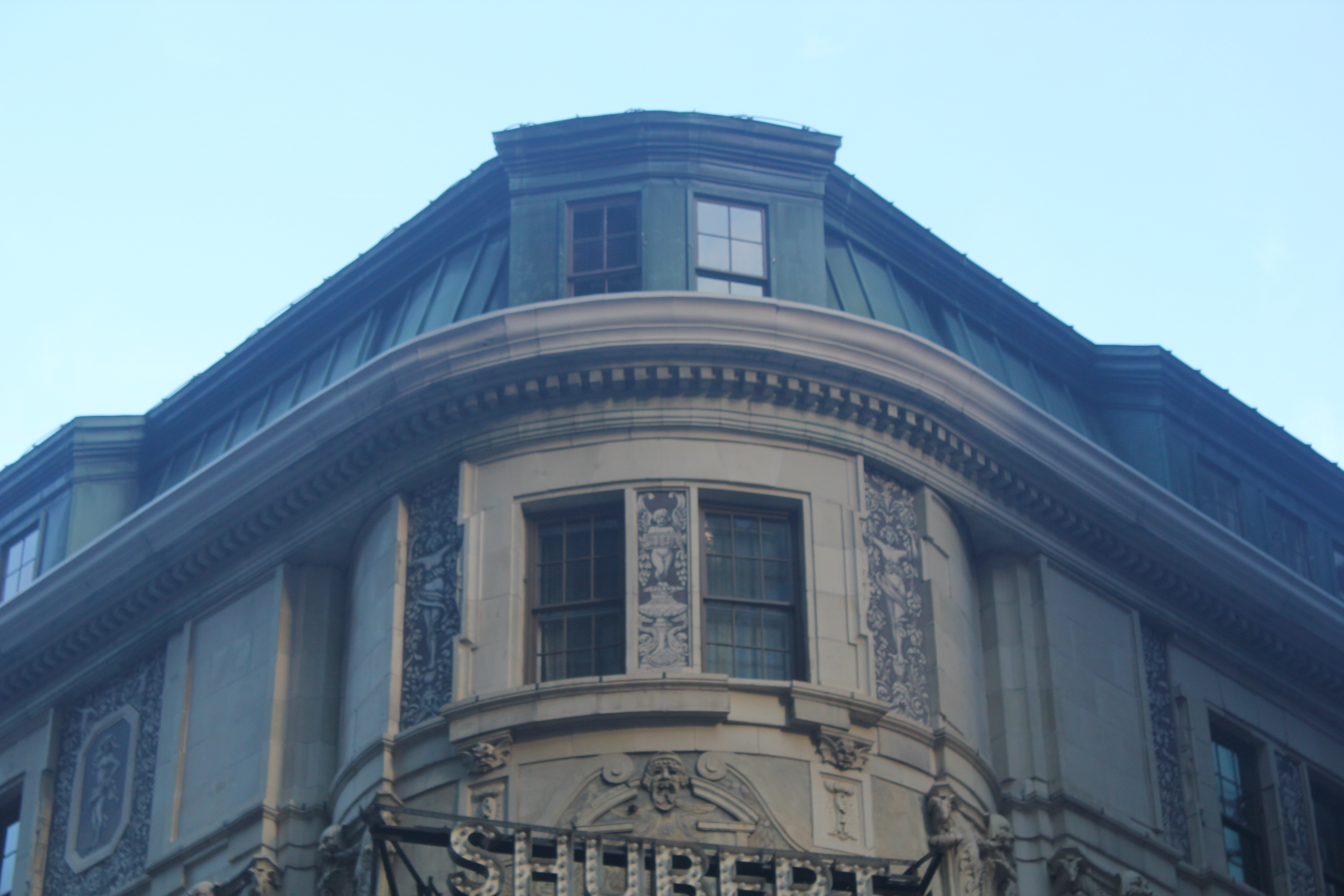
Window atop the curved corner

The Shubert Theatre hosted the Rodgers and Hart musical Higher and Higher in 1940, which was one of the partnership's few failures. This was followed the same year by the Guy Bolton musical Hold On to Your Hats, with Al Jolson and Martha Raye. The Shubert then hosted a revival of George Bernard Shaw's play The Doctor's Dilemma in 1941, with Cornell and Raymond Massey. A revival of Richard Brinsley Sheridan's The Rivals opened in 1942 with Mary Boland, Bobby Clark, Helen Ford, and Walter Hampden; and the Rodgers and Hart musical By Jupiter launched the same year with Ray Bolger. Subsequently, Margaret Webster's revival of Othello opened in 1943 with José Ferrer, Uta Hagen, and Paul Robeson. The Shubert's productions in 1944 included the play Catherine Was Great with Mae West, as well as Harold Arlen and E. Y. Harburg's musical comedy Bloomer Girl.

In January 1947, the Shubert hosted the Victor Herbert musical Sweethearts, featuring Bobby Clark and Marjorie Gateson, for 288 performances. This was followed the same December by a transfer of the musical High Button Shoes, with Nanette Fabray and Phil Silvers, which stayed for almost a year before transferring again. The Maxwell Anderson play Anne of the Thousand Days with Rex Harrison then opened at the Shubert in late 1948, and Lunt and Fontanne appeared the next year in I Know My Love. A plaque celebrating the Shuberts' achievements was installed on the theater's east wall in 1949. Subsequently, Cole Porter's musical comedy Kiss Me, Kate relocated to the Shubert in 1950, staying for a year. Lerner and Loewe's musical Paint Your Wagon opened at the Shubert in 1951 and featured James Barton for 289 performances. Next, the Shaw play The Millionairess opened in 1952 and featured Katharine Hepburn and Cyril Ritchard.

The Shubert hosted the Peter Ustinov play The Love of Four Colonels in 1953 with Rex Harrison and Lilli Palmer. For the next two years, the theater hosted Porter's musical Can-Can. This was followed in 1955 by Rodgers and Hammerstein's musical Pipe Dream, one of the team's less successful ventures. Next, the Theatre Guild presented Betty Comden, Adolph Green, and Jule Styne's musical Bells Are Ringing in 1956, featuring Judy Holliday and Sydney Chaplin; it ran for two years, relocating only because of a booking conflict. Afterward, A Majority of One opened in 1959 with Gertrude Berg and Cedric Hardwicke, and Bob Merrill's musical Take Me Along opened the same year.

=== 1960s to 1980s ===
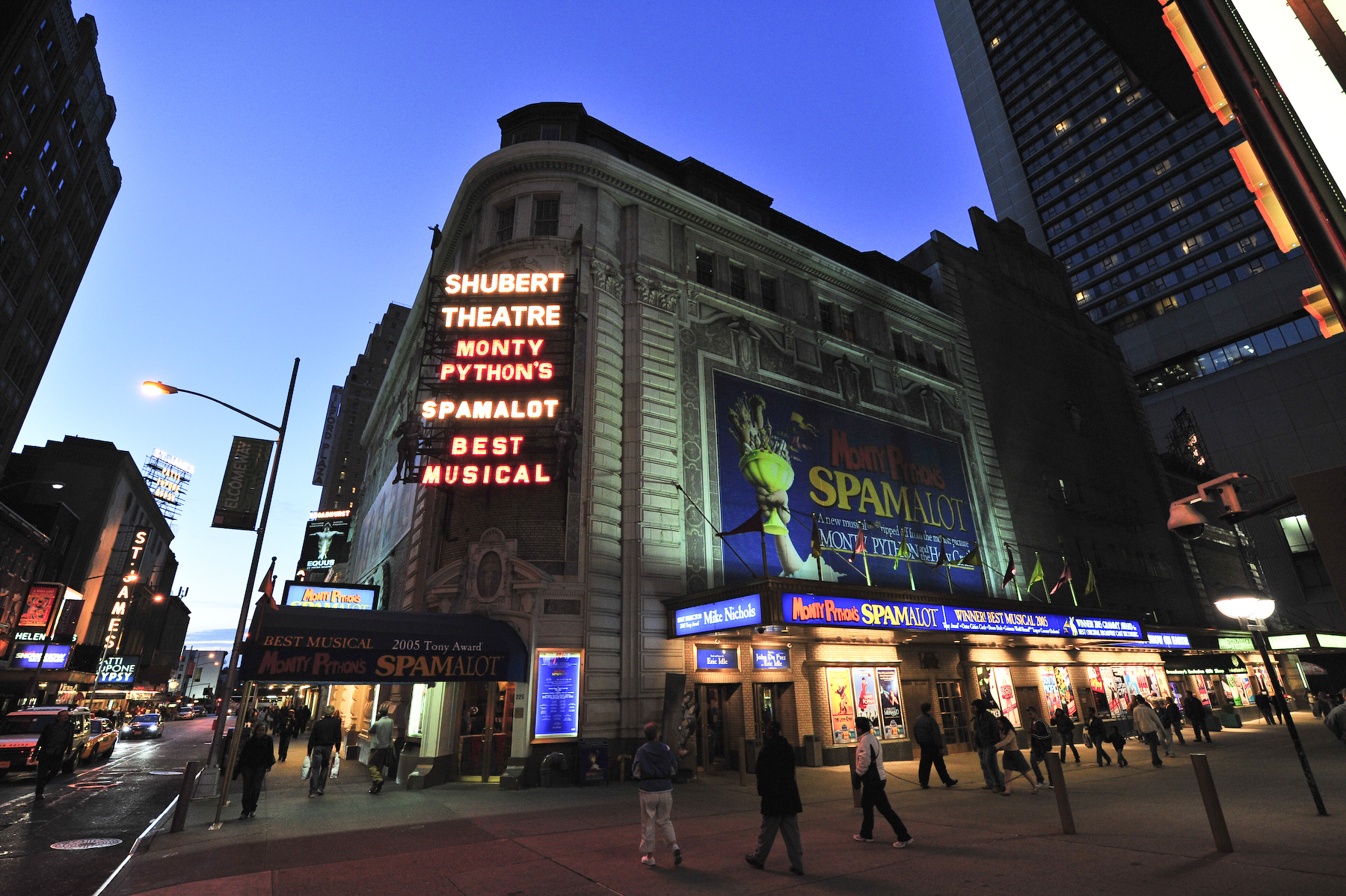
The theater as seen at dusk

In 1962, the Shubert hosted the musical I Can Get It for You Wholesale, which marked both Barbra Streisand's first Broadway show and Harold Rome's final large Broadway musical. The same year, David Merrick produced Anthony Newley and Leslie Bricusse's musical Stop the World – I Want to Get Off at the Shubert. Next was the Meredith Willson musical Here's Love, which opened in 1963 with Janis Paige and Craig Stevens, but it was not as successful as Willson's previous hits. Also in 1963, to celebrate Shubert Alley's 50th anniversary, the Shubert family embedded a plaque in a corner of the Shubert Theatre. Newley and Bricusse had another hit at the Shubert in 1965, The Roar of the Greasepaint – The Smell of the Crowd. The Shubert next presented Jerry Bock and Sheldon Harnick's The Apple Tree, a set of three one-act musicals, in 1966.

The Shubert hosted its first Tony Awards in 1967, an occasion for which the surrounding stretch of 44th Street was covered in carpeting. The theater also hosted the 1968 Tony Awards. The musical Golden Rainbow, originally scheduled to open at the Shubert in November 1967, instead premiered the following February with Marilyn Cooper, Eydie Gormé, and Steve Lawrence. The Neil Simon musical Promises, Promises opened that December with Jerry Orbach, setting a house record with 1,281 performances over the next three years. This was followed in 1973 by Hugh Wheeler and Stephen Sondheim's musical A Little Night Music, featuring Glynis Johns, Len Cariou, and Hermione Gingold. The next year, the Shubert hosted the musical Over Here! with two Andrews Sisters, John Travolta, and Treat Williams, as well as the 1974 Tony Awards.

Edward Albee's play Seascape opened at the Shubert with Deborah Kerr and Barry Nelson in January 1975, followed that April by W. Somerset Maugham's play The Constant Wife with Ingrid Bergman. Joseph Papp and the Public Theater relocated their production of the musical A Chorus Line from off-Broadway to the Shubert Theatre in October 1975. The show's relocation increased Broadway theater attendance from 6.6 million to 7.3 million in one year, and the musical itself ultimately stayed for more than a decade, winning a Pulitzer Prize for Drama. During the run of Chorus Line, the Shubert hosted Tony Awards ceremonies in 1976, 1977, 1978, 1979, and 1985. Chorus Line became the longest-running Broadway show in 1983, and it became the first Broadway show to run for 5,000 performances in 1987. The Shubert hosted a memorial service for Chorus Line's choreographer Michael Bennett shortly after the musical's 5,000th performance.

The New York City Landmarks Preservation Commission (LPC) had started considering protecting the Shubert as a landmark in 1982, with discussions continuing over the next several years. The LPC designated the Shubert's facade and interior as landmarks on December 15, 1987. This was part of the LPC's wide-ranging effort in 1987 to grant landmark status to Broadway theaters. The New York City Board of Estimate ratified the designations in March 1988. The Shubert Organization, the Nederlander Organization, and Jujamcyn collectively sued the LPC in June 1988 to overturn the landmark designations of 22 theaters, including the Shubert, on the merit that the designations severely limited the extent to which the theaters could be modified. The lawsuit was escalated to the New York Supreme Court and the Supreme Court of the United States, but these designations were ultimately upheld in 1992.

=== 1990s to present ===
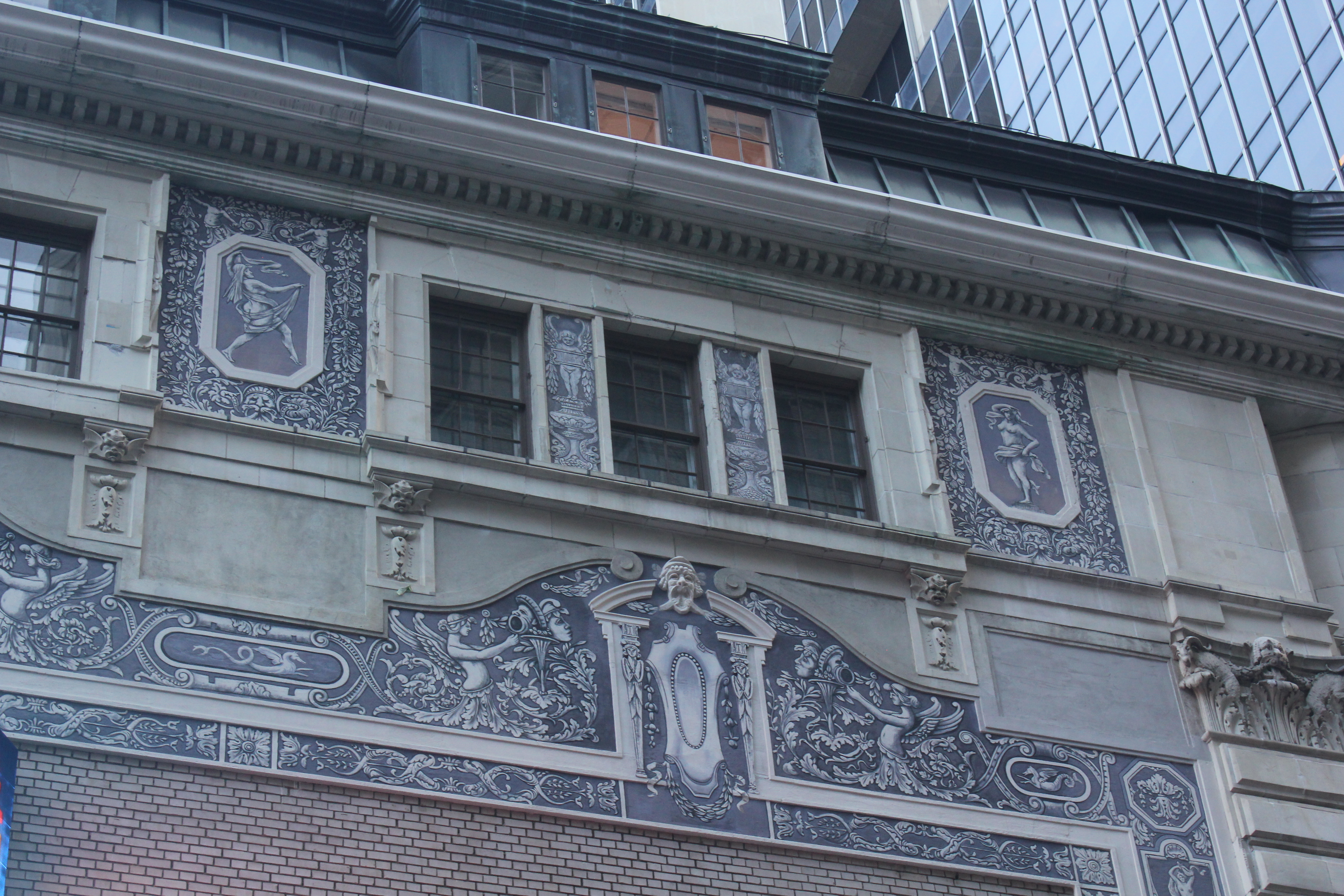
Upper-story windows on the 44th Street facade

By early 1990, A Chorus Line was no longer profitable for Papp, and the show ended that April after 6,137 performances. The popular West End musical Buddy: The Buddy Holly Story was then booked for the Shubert, and the theater was closed for renovations during much of 1990. The Buddy Holly Story opened that November and ran for 225 performances, much shorter than its West End appearance. The next hit at the Shubert was the George and Ira Gershwin musical Crazy for You, which opened in February 1992 and lasted 1,622 performances through January 1996. During this time, the theater also hosted memorial services for performers such as Helen Hayes in 1993 and Jessica Tandy in 1994. The theater was then renovated again for $3.7 million, with its technical systems being updated. Next was the musical Big, which opened in April 1996 and had 192 performances.

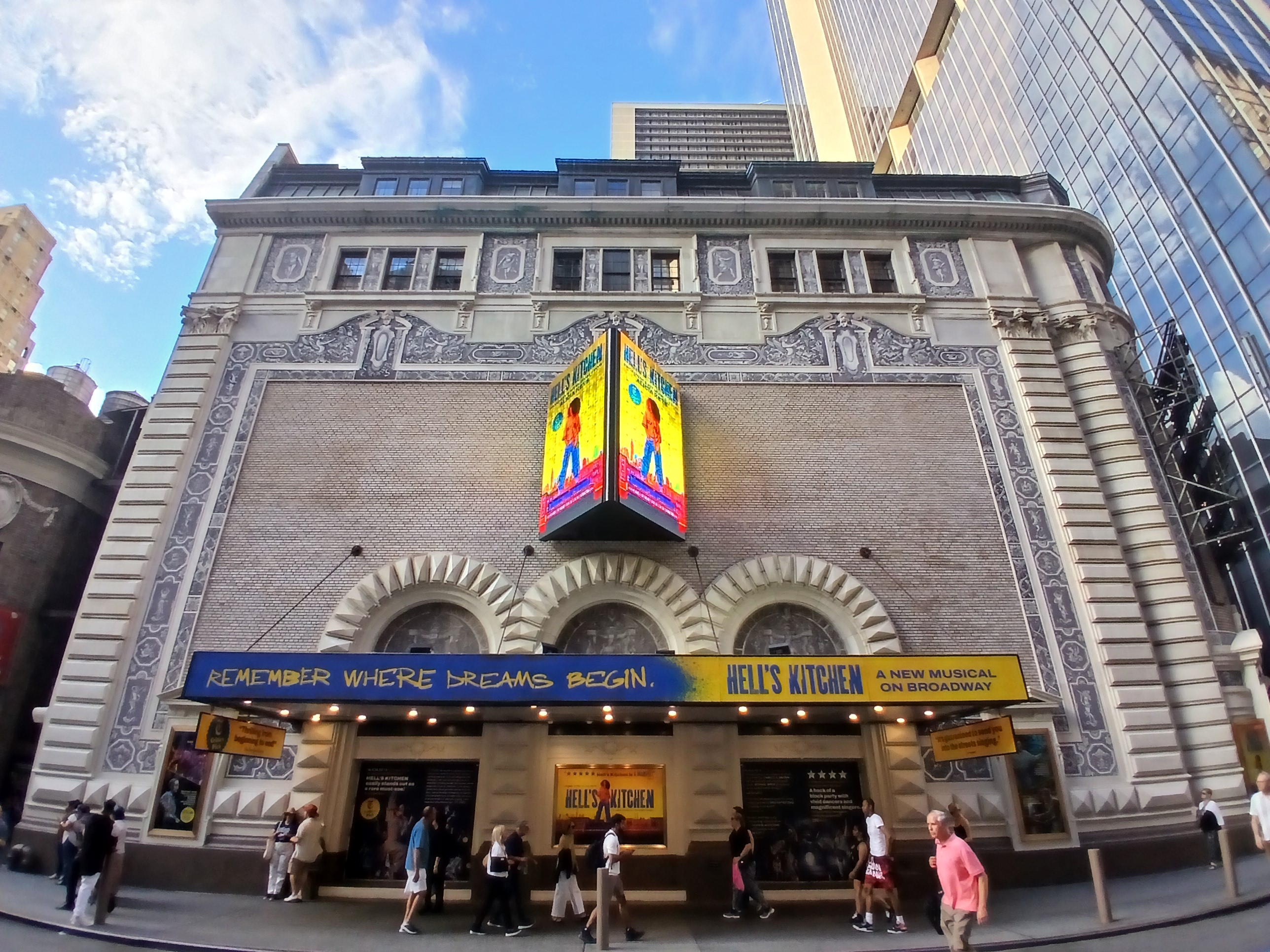
The Shubert Theatre as seen in 2025

A revival of the musical Chicago relocated to the Shubert in February 1997 and remained until January 2003, when the show moved to the Ambassador Theatre. A tribute to lyricist Adolph Green was hosted at the theater in late 2002, near the end of Chicago's run there. The Jule Styne and Stephen Sondheim musical Gypsy then opened in May 2003, running at the Shubert for a year. As part of a settlement with the United States Department of Justice in 2003, the Shuberts agreed to improve disabled access at their 16 landmarked Broadway theaters, including the Shubert. This was followed by a dance special, Forever Tango, in the latter half of 2004. The theater's next hit was the musical comedy Spamalot, which opened in 2005 and ran for nearly four years. It was succeeded by a three-month revival of Noel Coward's Blithe Spirit in 2009. Yet another long-running show opened at the Shubert in October 2009: David Bryan and Joe DiPietro's musical Memphis, which lasted for 1,166 performances through 2012. During Memphis's run, three shows ran for one night each: Brigadoon in 2010, Camelot in 2011, and Oliver! in 2012.

Tim Minchin's West End hit Matilda the Musical opened at the Shubert in April 2013 and ran for 1,554 performances through the beginning of 2017. Subsequently, the Shubert staged a revival of Hello Dolly! with Bette Midler from April 2017 to August 2018. Hello, Dolly! broke the box office record for the Shubert Theatre twelve times, grossing $2.4 million during the week of October 23, 2017. Aaron Sorkin's play To Kill a Mockingbird opened in December 2018 and ran until all Broadway theaters temporarily closed on March 12, 2020, due to the COVID-19 pandemic. The Shubert reopened on October 5, 2021, with To Kill a Mockingbird, which closed in January 2022. The Shubert's next booking, a limited run of the farce POTUS, opened in April 2022. It was followed by the musical Some Like It Hot in December 2022, which closed in December 2023. The musical Hell's Kitchen opened at the theater in April 2024, transferring from off-Broadway. It closed in February 2026, and a limited run of Celebrity Autobiography opened at the Shubert that May for a three-month run. It is to be followed by the rock musical Galileo, which is is scheduled to open in December 2026.

== Notable productions ==
Productions are listed by the year of their first performance.

Notable productions at the theater
Opening year	Name	Refs.
1913	Johnston Forbes-Robertson Repertory Company series (eight unique productions)	(Note: Hamlet, Mice and Men, The Light That Failed, Caesar and Cleopatra, The Passing of the Third Floor Back, The Sacrament of Judas, The Merchant of Venice, Othello)
1914	To-Night's the Night	
1915	Trilby	
1916	If I Were King	
1917	Love O' Mike	
1917	Eileen	
1917	Her Soldier Boy	
1917	Maytime	
1918	The Copperhead	
1918	Sometime	
1919	Shakespeare series (three unique productions)	(Note: Hamlet, Twelfth Night, The Taming of the Shrew)
1919	Oh, What A Girl!	
1920	The Blue Flame	
1920, 1921, 1922, 1924, 1926	Greenwich Village Follies	
1922	The Hotel Mouse	
1922	Red Pepper	
1923	Blossom Time	
1923	Artists and Models	
1925	Othello	
1925	Sky High	
1925	Beggar on Horseback	
1925	Princess Ida	
1926	Countess Maritza	
1927	And So To Bed	
1927	Harry Delmar's Revels	
1928	The Five O'Clock Girl	
1929	The Street Singer	
1930	Shakespeare series (nine unique productions)	(Note: Hamlet, Macbeth, Twelfth Night, The Merchant of Venice, The Taming of the Shrew, King Richard III, King Lear, As You Like It, Julius Caesar)
1930	Symphony in Two Flats	
1930	The Last Enemy	
1931	Peter Ibbetson	
1931	Everybody's Welcome	
1932	Smiling Faces	
1933	Gay Divorce	
1933	Shady Lady	
1934	Dodsworth	
1935	Escape Me Never	
1935	Rosmersholm	
1936	Love on the Dole	
1936	Idiot's Delight	
1937	The Masque of Kings	
1937	Babes in Arms	
1937	Amphitryon 38	
1938	The Seagull	
1938	I Married an Angel	
1939	The Philadelphia Story	
1940	Higher and Higher	
1940	Hold On to Your Hats	
1941	The Doctor's Dilemma	
1941	Pal Joey	
1941	Candle in the Wind	
1942	The Rivals	
1942	Candida	
1942	By Jupiter	
1943	The Vagabond King	
1943	Othello	
1944	Catherine Was Great	
1944	Bloomer Girl	
1946	Are You with It?	
1946	Park Avenue	
1947	Sweethearts	
1947	Under the Counter	
1947	The First Mrs. Fraser	
1947	High Button Shoes	
1948	Anne of the Thousand Days	
1949	Lend an Ear	
1949	I Know My Love	
1950	Kiss Me, Kate	
1951	Jose Greco Ballet	
1951	Paint Your Wagon	
1952	The Millionairess	
1953	The Love of Four Colonels	
1953	Can-Can	
1955	Gilbert and Sullivan series (eight unique productions)	(Note: The Yeomen of the Guard, The Pirates of Penzance, The Mikado, Princess Ida, Trial by Jury, H.M.S. Pinafore, Ruddigore, Iolanthe)
1955	Pipe Dream	
1956	Will Success Spoil Rock Hunter?	
1956	The Pajama Game	
1956	Bells Are Ringing	
1958	Whoop-Up	
1959	A Majority of One	
1959	Take Me Along	
1961	Bye Bye Birdie	
1961	The Gay Life	
1962	I Can Get It for You Wholesale	
1962	Stop the World – I Want to Get Off	
1963	Here's Love	
1964	Oliver!	
1964	Bajour	
1965	The Roar of the Greasepaint – The Smell of the Crowd	
1965	Inadmissible Evidence	
1966	Ivanov	
1966	Wait Until Dark	
1966	The Apple Tree	
1968	Golden Rainbow	
1968	Promises, Promises	
1972	An Evening with Richard Nixon	
1972	The Creation of the World and Other Business	
1973	A Little Night Music	
1973	The Sunshine Boys	
1974	Over Here!	
1975	Seascape	
1975	The Constant Wife	
1975	A Chorus Line	
1990	Buddy – The Buddy Holly Story	
1992	Crazy for You	
1996	Big	
1996	Chicago	
2003	Gypsy	
2005	Spamalot	
2005	A Wonderful Life	(Note: This production was a special or limited run that took place during the longer run of another show.)
2009	Blithe Spirit	
2009	Memphis	
2010	Brigadoon	
2011	Camelot	
2012	Oliver!	
2013	Matilda the Musical	
2017	Hello, Dolly!	
2018	To Kill a Mockingbird	
2022	POTUS	
2022	Some Like It Hot	
2024	Hell's Kitchen	
2026	Celebrity Autobiography	
2026	Galileo	

== See also ==
- List of Broadway theaters
- List of New York City Designated Landmarks in Manhattan from 14th to 59th Streets
