= Shubert family =

American family influential in theater production

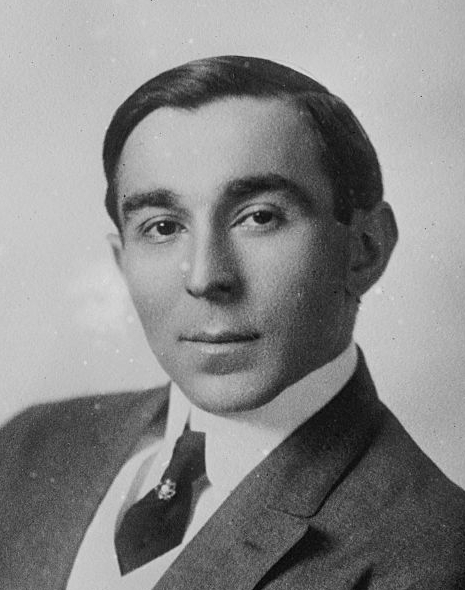
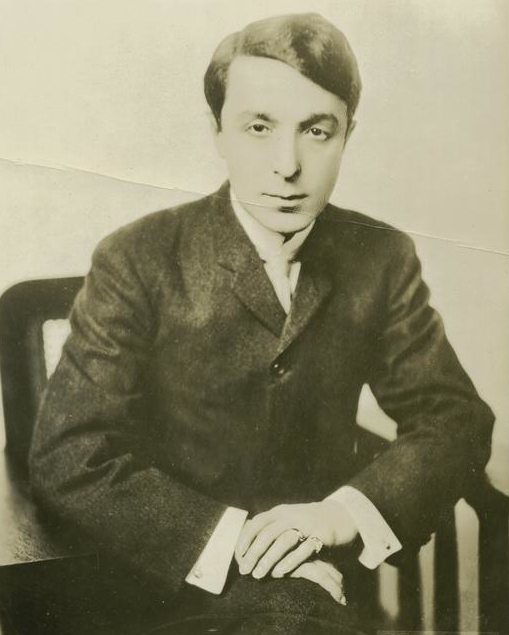
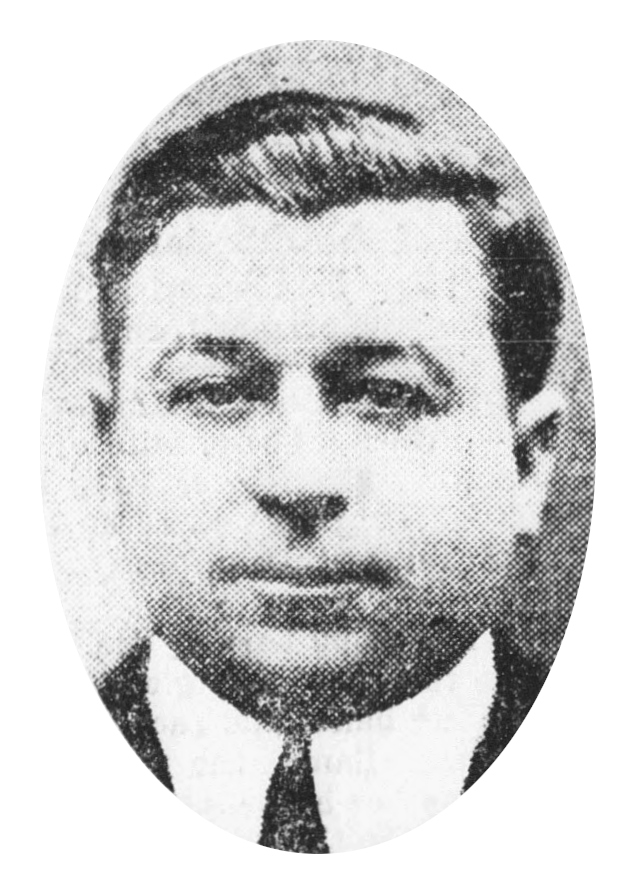
Brothers (from left) Lee Shubert, Sam S. Shubert, and Jacob J. Shubert

The Shubert family, of brothers Lee, Sam, and Jacob, was a central force in the establishment and expansion of both the legitimate theatre and vaudeville in the United States in the first half of the 20th century. By 1924, the Shubert Organization they founded controlled 75 percent of all American theatres, producing 25 percent of all plays, triggering the creation of Actor's Equity as a performing arts labor union in backlash. The organization's dominance resulted in a mid-1950s Supreme Court antitrust ruling forcing the brothers to partially divest their empire.

As of 2024, the Shubert Organization owns 17 Broadway theaters in New York City's Theater District, still the hub of the theatre industry in America, as well as off-Broadway venues and theatres in Boston and Philadelphia.

== History ==
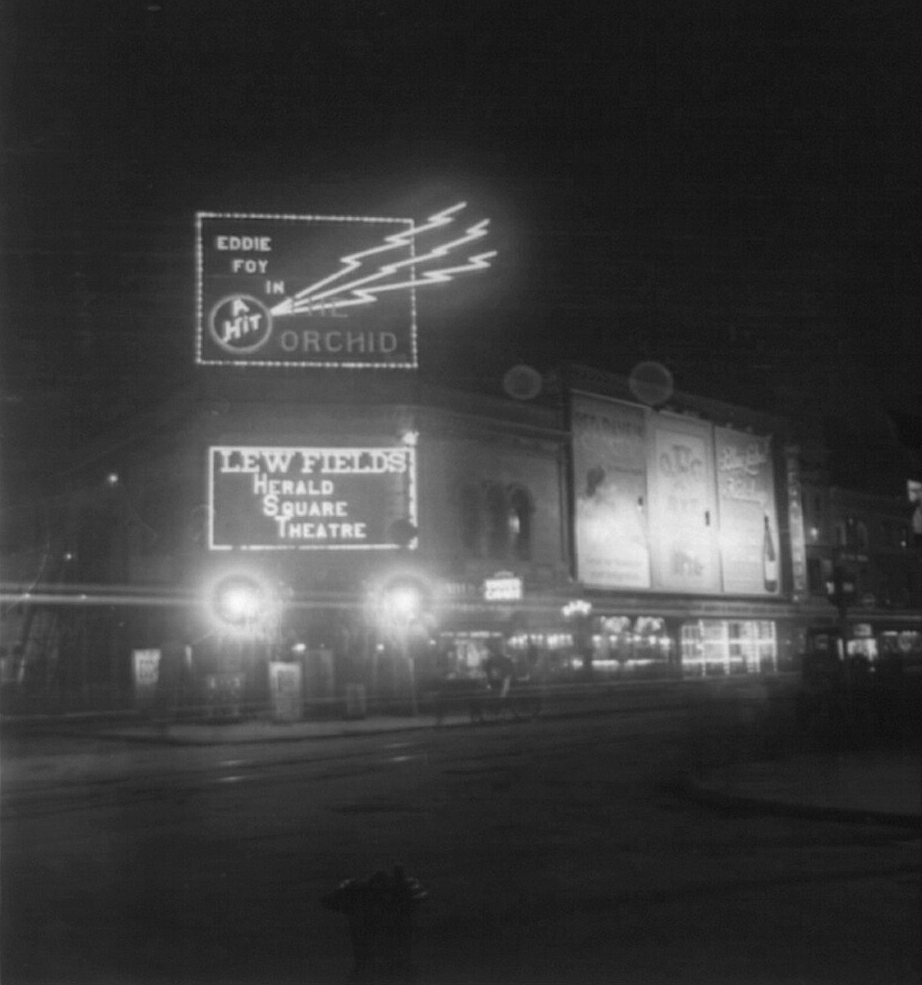
Herald Square Theatre in 1907

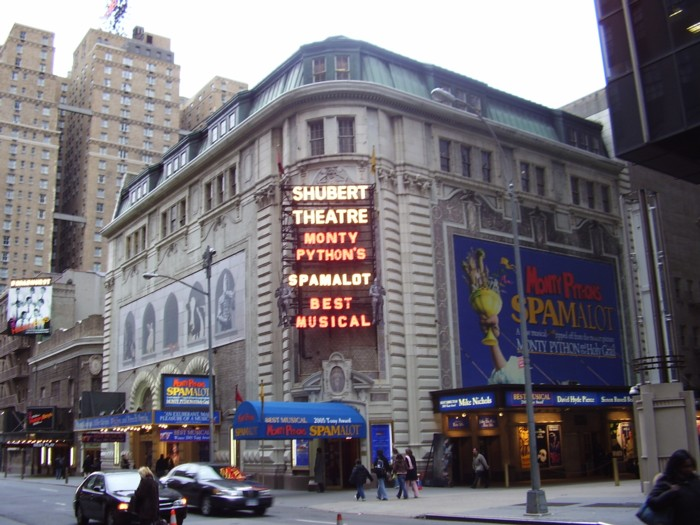
Shubert Theatre (Broadway) in 2006

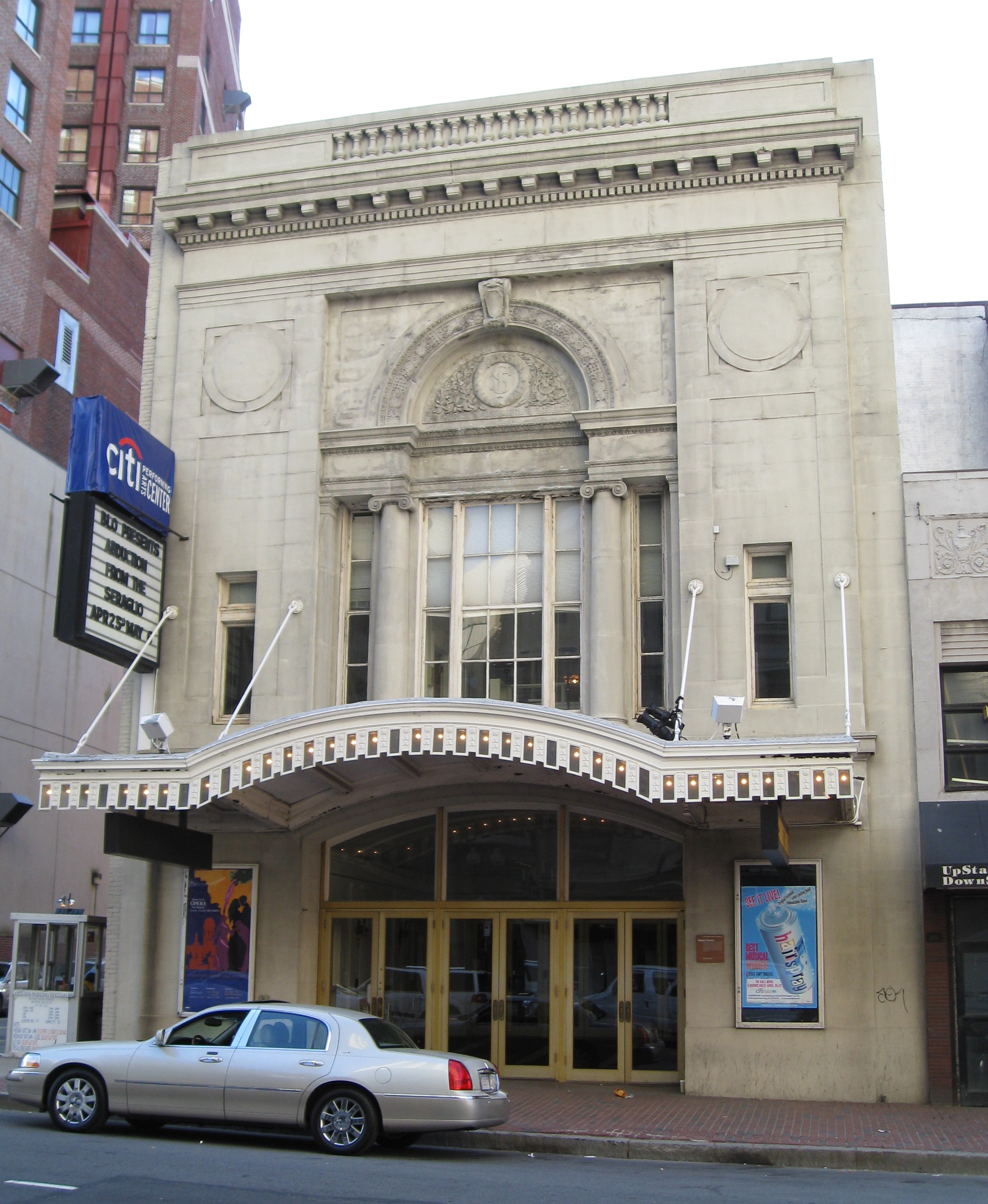
Shubert Theatre (Boston) in 2008

The family's history in America began when Duvvid Schubart (transliterated to "Shubert") and his wife Katrina (Gitel) Helwitz left their native town of Vladislavov in the Russian Empire (now Kudirkos Naumiestis, Lithuania) with their eight children, two of whom died after the journey. They arrived in New York City from Hamburg, via England, on June 12, 1881 on the S.S. Spain. They then settled in Syracuse, New York.

Due to their father's alcoholism, the three Shubert sons (Lee Shubert, Sam S. Shubert, and Jacob J. Shubert) had to give up much of their formal education and instead go to work when they were still children. Lee and Sam sold newspapers outside the Bastable Theatre, and David Belasco took notice of Sam and cast him in a small role in a play. Sam became enamored with the theatrical arts and went on to be promoted through a series of managerial jobs in Syracuse theatres, including program boy at the Bastable, assistant treasurer at the Grand Opera House, and treasurer of the Weiting. Lee and Jacob also began working in management roles in local theatres, and by 1900, the trio had acquired ownership of the Grand Opera House in Syracuse and the Herald Square Theatre in Manhattan.

The three brothers broke the monopoly on the theatre-management industry (represented by the Theatrical Syndicate under Abe Erlanger and Mark Klaw) in the founding of their agency, known today as The Shubert Organization. By 1924, they owned 86 theatres in the United States, and operated, managed, or booked hundreds more. By 1942, they owned, leased, or managed 20 of New York City's approximately 40 legitimate theatres and controlled some 15 in other cities. By 1953, they had produced 600 shows under their credits and had booked 1,000 shows into their numerous theatres. In 1950, the federal government took the Shuberts to court, alleging that their business practices violated antitrust laws. In 1955, the U.S. Supreme Court ruled that they were subject to and in violation of antitrust laws, so they sold 12 theatres in six cities and gave up the booking business, which, until then, had been the heart of their enterprise. As of 2024, the Shubert Organization owns 17 Broadway theatres in New York City, including the Winter Garden Theatre, the Shubert Theatre, and the Imperial Theatre. They also own two theatres outside of New York, the Shubert Theatre in Boston and the Forrest Theatre in Philadelphia. Additionally, they own and operate two off-Broadway facilities in New York City, Stage 42 and a 5-stage facility called New World Stages. They also managed the National Theatre in Washington, D.C. until 2013.

Jerry Stagg identifies Lee Shubert as the key partner in the business, telling of how he built the most successful theatrical empire in history. Stagg characterizes the trio as vulgar and uneducated but acknowledges that they made a personal monopoly amassing millions of profits in the process. Entertainment and popular taste were the goals, rather than the enhancement of the dramatic arts. The Shuberts opened new theatre districts in many major American cities, employing thousands of people over the years. By 1924, they controlled 75 percent of all American theatres, producing 25 percent of all plays. In response, their actors created Actor's Equity as a labor union to counterbalance the Shuberts' power. When the Great Depression caused the bankruptcy of the Shuberts' corporate empire in 1933, their advisors urged them to retire and enjoy their accumulated wealth. Instead, the Shuberts sustained their business by pouring their own money into the venture. Thus, according to Stagg, the Shubert family almost single-handedly kept legitimate theatre alive in America.

== Notable productions ==
=== Musical comedies ===
- Chinese Honeymoon (1902)
- Winsome Winnie (1903)
- The Babes and the Baron (1905)
- The Dancing Duchess (1914)

=== Revues ===
- Pioneer Days (1906) featuring Indians, cavalry, baby elephants, and chorus girls, directed by Lee Shubert
- The Passing Show (1912–24), annual musical revue, rivaling Florenz Ziegfeld's Follies.

=== Operettas ===
- The Blue Paradise (1915), and other Sigmund Romberg musicals

== Family ==
The Shubert children:

1. Fannie Shubert (1868–1928). From her first marriage to Isaac Isaacs, she had three sons: Jesse Isaacs (1893–1904), Larry Shubert (1894–1965), and Milton Isaacs Shubert (1901–1967). Her second husband was William Weissager.
2. Sarah Shubert (1870–1934). Married to Edward Davidow. No children.
3. Lee Shubert (1871–1953), theatre owner/operator, producer. Married to Marcella Swanson (1900–1973). No children.
4. Sam S. Shubert (1878–1905), producer, writer, director, and theatre owner/operator; died in a Pennsylvania train accident
5. Jacob J. Shubert (1879–1963), producer, director, and theatre owner/operator. From his first marriage to Catherine Dealy, he had a son John Jason Shubert (1908–1962).
6. Dora (Debora) Shubert (1880–1951). From her marriage to Milton Wolf (1881–1955), she had a daughter, Sylvia Wolf Golde (1910–1981)
