= Sam S. Shubert =

American producer and theatre owner/operator (1878–1905)

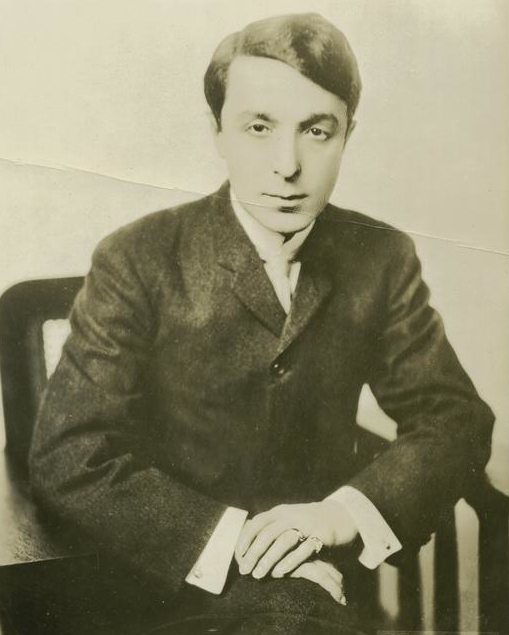
- Born: August 27, 1878; Vladislavov, Suwałki Governorate, Congress Poland
- Died: May 12, 1905 (aged 26); Harrisburg, Pennsylvania, U.S.
- Occupations: Theatre owner/operator Theatrical producer
- Relatives: Lee Shubert, brother Jacob J. Shubert, brother

Samuel S. Shubert (August 27, 1878 – May 12, 1905) (Note: Shubert's resting place in the Shubert family vault, photos of which can be found online, lists his birth date as August 27, 1878, and his date of death as May 13, 1905. Contemporary newspapers reported his death as having occurred at 9:30 a.m. on the 12th, with his body arriving in New York City that evening.) was an American producer and theatre owner/operator. He was the middle son in the Shubert family and was raised in Syracuse, New York. Shubert died at age 26 due to injuries sustained in a train wreck, and his surviving brothers named various theatres plus the Shubert Foundation in his honor.

== Biography ==
Born in Vladislavov, in the Suwałki Governorate of Congress Poland, a part of the Russian Empire (present-day Kudirkos Naumiestis, Lithuania) to a Lithuanian-Jewish family, he was the second son and fifth child of Duvvid Schubart and Katrina Helwitz. He was four years old when the family emigrated to the United States in 1881. They settled in Syracuse, New York, where a number of Lithuanian Jewish families were already living. His father's alcoholism kept the family in difficult financial circumstances, and at a very young age Sam Shubert had to work as a shoeshine boy.

=== Syracuse operations ===
He eventually obtained a job at the Grand Opera House, selling programs and working in the box office. Although he only had a rudimentary education, Sam Shubert had a quick mind for mathematics, which resulted in his promotion to assistant treasurer. After accepting the position of treasurer at the Wieting Theatre, the largest in the city of Syracuse, Shubert soon developed an interest in the production of plays. With borrowed money, he embarked on a venture that led him and his two brothers to be the successful operators of several theaters in upstate New York.

=== Theatre empire ===
The Shubert brothers decided to expand to the huge market in New York City and at the end of March 1900, Sam Shubert leased the Herald Square Theatre at the corner of Broadway and 35th Street in Manhattan. Leaving younger brother Jacob at home to manage their existing theatres, he and older brother Lee moved to New York City, where they laid the foundation for what was to become the largest theatre empire of the 20th century.

Sam Shubert had the idea for his first original production, Fantana, which premiered at the Lyric Theatre on January 14, 1905. "The show was Sam's idea, and he more or less cowrote the libretto. When his coauthor, Robert B. Smith, claimed to have done all the actual writing, Sam admitted that he had but would not change the credits." He also took the directing credit for the 1904 revival of the comedy opera Wang: "under the personal direction of Sam. S. Shubert."

=== Death and legacy ===
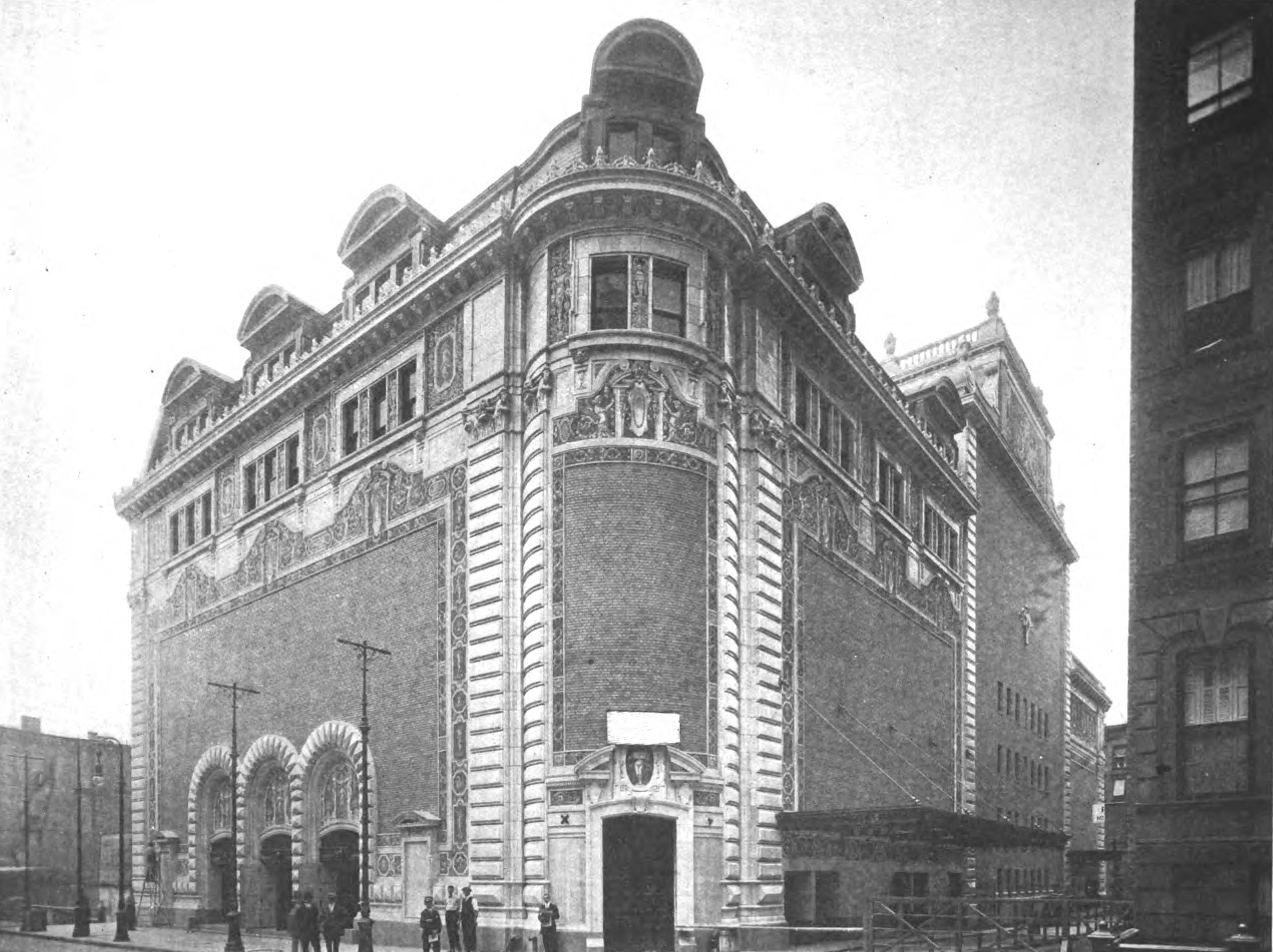
Sam S. Shubert Theatre in New York City, c. 1913

In the early hours of May 11, 1905, Shubert was traveling to Pittsburgh, Pennsylvania, on business, when the passenger train he was on collided with several freight cars, including one containing dynamite, which exploded, in the Lochiel neighborhood of south Harrisburg. Severely injured in the train wreck, he succumbed to his injuries the next day. His body was brought back to New York for burial in the Salem Fields Cemetery in Brooklyn.

His brothers named multiple theaters in his honor, beginning as early as October 1906 in Kansas City, Missouri. The Shubert Theatre in Boston, which opened in 1910, was also named in his honor. The Sam S. Shubert Theater and Shubert Building—as listed on the National Register of Historic Places—opened in 1910 in Saint Paul, Minnesota; it is now known as the Fitzgerald Theater. In 1913, his brothers opened the Sam S. Shubert Theatre in the heart of the Broadway Theater District. The Boston and New York City buildings still carry the Shubert name and continue as active theaters, with the latter being one of the great landmarks of Broadway. Other theaters named in his honor include the Majestic Theatre in Chicago, which was purchased by The Shubert Organization in 1945 and renamed. The Shubert Foundation, formed in 1945, was also named in his honor.

== Sources ==
- Hirsch, Foster. The Boys From Syracuse (1998), SIU Press. ISBN 0-8093-2156-4
