= Forrest Theatre =

Theater in Philadelphia, Pennsylvania

Coordinates: 39.9486°N 75.1596°W

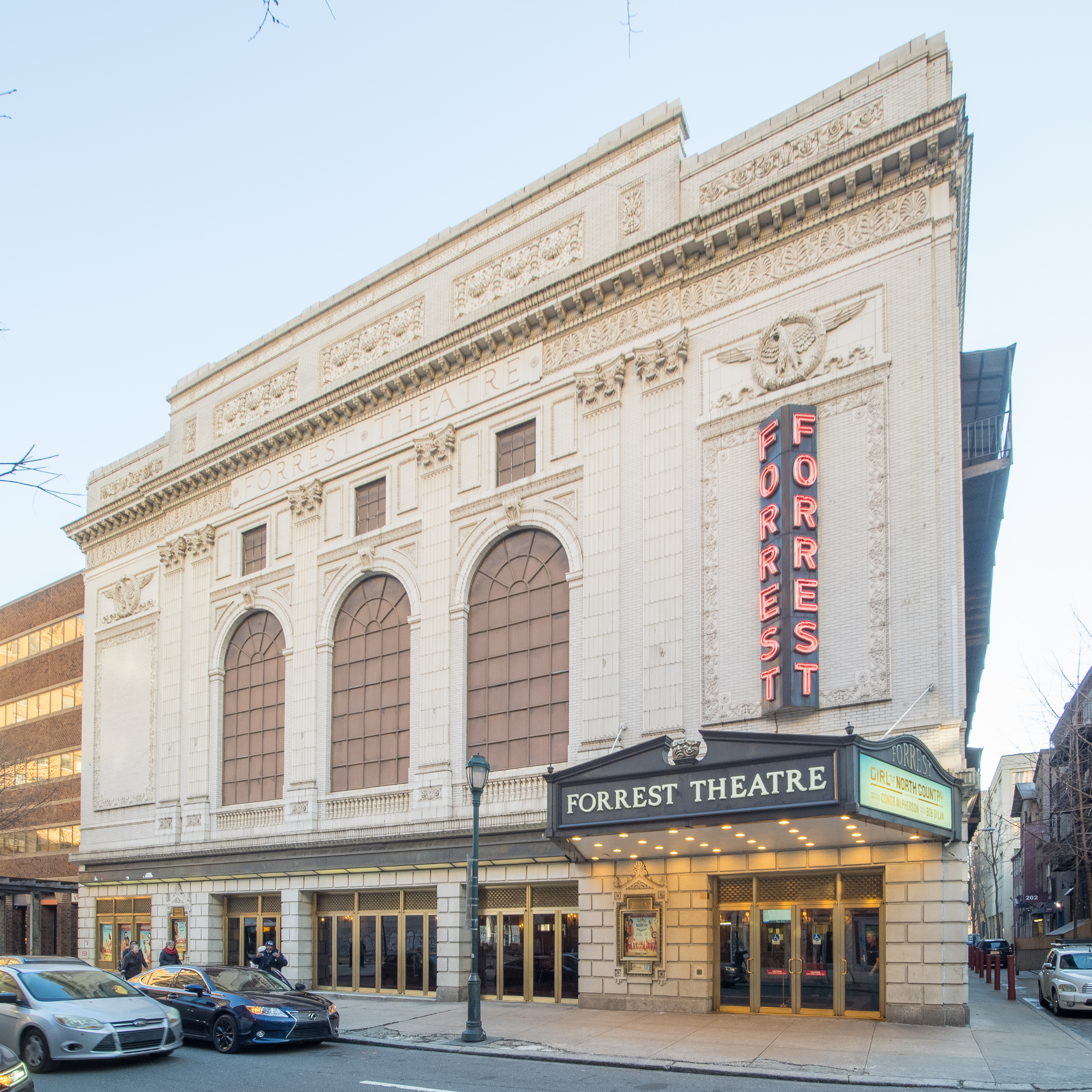
- Forrest Theatre in 2024
- Interactive map of Forrest Theatre
- Address: 1114 Walnut Street; Philadelphia; United States
- Owner: The Shubert Organization
- Capacity: 1,851
- Public transit: 12–13th & Locust station

Construction
- Opened: May 1, 1928
- Rebuilt: 1997
- Years active: 1928–present
- Architect: Herbert J. Krapp

Website
- www.forrest-theatre.com

The Forrest Theatre is a live theatre venue at 1114 Walnut Street in the Center City area of Philadelphia, Pennsylvania. It has a seating capacity of 1,851 and is managed by The Shubert Organization.

The original Forrest Theatre was on Broad and Sansom Street but Fidelity Trust Company demolished it and replaced it in 1928 with the Fidelity-Philadelphia Trust Company Building (now the Wells Fargo Building).

The new theatre was built in 1927 at the cost of $2 million, and was designed by architect Herbert J. Krapp; (Note: In 1925, Krapp had designed a Broadway in New York City that was also named the Forrest. That theatre has been renamed a number of times, and is currently the Eugene O'Neill Theatre.) it was named after the 19th century actor Edwin Forrest, who was born in Philadelphia, and owned and lived in the Edwin Forrest House. The opening performance was The Red Robe in 1928. A renovation of the theatre was undertaken in 1997, including redecoration and the addition of handicapped-accessible restrooms.

Over the years, the Forrest Theatre has been a proving ground for various Broadway plays and musicals, serving as the location for previews and try-outs of these productions. Some of the shows that played at the Forrest prior to moving to Broadway include The Women (1936), Make Mine Manhattan (1948), Along Fifth Avenue (1948), The Liar (1950), Wonderful Town (1953), The Music Man (1957), Funny Girl (1963), The Star-Spangled Girl (1966), Breakfast at Tiffany's (1966), Golden Rainbow (1967), The Wiz (1974), and Chicago (1975).

Since the 2007–08 season, the Forrest Theatre has joined with the Kimmel Center for the Performing Arts to offer a season of Broadway touring productions.
