= Lee Shubert =

Lithuanian-American theatre owner/operator and producer (1871–1953)

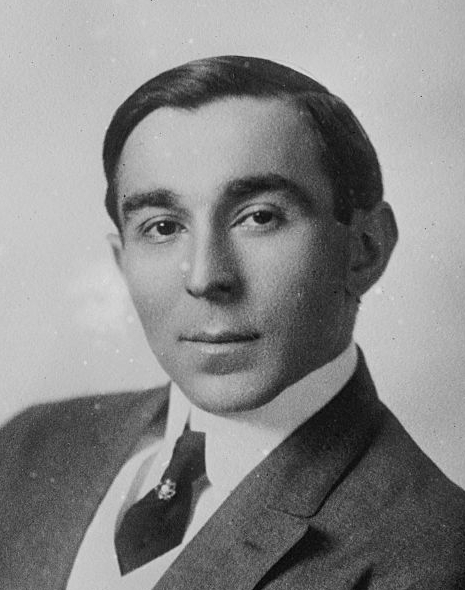
- Shubert in 1908
- Born: Levi Schubart (Note: Some sources cite Shubard or Szemanski as the original spelling.); March 25, 1871; Vladislavov, Suwałki Governorate, Congress Poland
- Died: December 25, 1953 (aged 82); New York City, U.S.
- Occupations: Theatre owner/operator Theatrical producer
- Relatives: Sam S. Shubert, brother Jacob J. Shubert, brother

Lee Shubert (born Levi Schubart; March 25, 1871 – December 25, 1953) (Note: The New York Times obituary of December 26, 1953, gave his date of birth as March 15, 1875, although Shubert had told friends he was more than 80. His draft registration card of September 1918 listed the same birth date, while also checking the "Native Born" box.) was a Lithuanian-born American theatre owner/operator and producer. He was the eldest of three brothers of the notable Shubert family.

== Early life ==
Born to a Jewish family, the son of Duvvid Schubart and Katrina Helwitz, in Vladislavov, in the Suwałki Governorate of Congress Poland, a part of the Russian Empire (present-day Kudirkos Naumiestis, Lithuania), Shubert was 11 years old when the family emigrated to the United States and settled in Syracuse, New York, where a number of Jewish families from their hometown already were living.

== Career ==
His father's alcoholism kept the family in difficult financial circumstances, and Lee Shubert went to work selling newspapers on a street corner. With borrowed money, he and younger brothers Sam and Jacob eventually embarked on a business venture that led to them to become the successful operators of several theaters in upstate New York.

The Shubert brothers decided to expand to the huge market in New York City, and at the end of March 1900 they leased the Herald Square Theatre at the corner of Broadway and 35th Street in Manhattan. Leaving younger brother Jacob at home to manage their existing theatres, Lee and Sam Shubert moved to New York City, where they laid the foundations for what was to become the largest theatre empire in the 20th century, including the Winter Garden and Shubert Theatres.

The all-powerful Theatrical Syndicate essentially excluded competition. Since the Shuberts were not permitted to use Syndicate-controlled theaters, they put on shows in rented circus tents, holding "three times as many customers as the typical theater." In 1910, they formed the Independent National Theatre Owner's Association, which brought about the defection of many theaters from all around the country that previously had been affiliated with the Syndicate. In 1922, it was announced that "Lee Shubert and A. L. Erlanger ... rivals for twenty years" had reached a working understanding.

Lee Shubert was a hard nosed businessman who has been criticized for being money and power oriented with little interest in culture. He was well-known for banning critics from all his theaters if they wrote something that upset him, to the point that the laws in the state of New York were changed to prevent the practice. Nonetheless, he recognized the need to attract some of the top stage actors from the long-established European theatres (as Gaby Deslys) to perform at the new Broadway houses. After a disastrous production of Hamlet in 1901 at a competitor's theatre, French megastar Sarah Bernhardt vowed never to return to America until Lee Shubert convinced her to perform for his company in 1905.

At his death in 1953, Shubert's estate was worth $16 million ($193 million in 2025). He boasted in 1924 of his family success:

We began building theaters, and introduced practical commercial methods into a flagrantly impractical and precarious profession....This sordid commercialism has helped to make the American stage a legitimate, financial risk, stabilized its revenue, attracted real money to it, reduced the margin of chance, increased its facilities, and widened its opportunities.

== Personal life ==
Shubert was married to Marcella Swanson, a former actress who was approximately 30 years younger. They had previously been secretly married on July 29, 1936, in Berlin and divorced in September 1948 in Reno, Nevada. They remarried in Miami in March 1949. (Note: Time magazine reported the remarriage was in February 1949.)

Shubert died in New York City on December 25, 1953, and was interred in the family plot at Salem Fields Cemetery in Brooklyn. His widow died in 1973.

== Sources ==
- Hirsch, Foster. The Boys from Syracuse (1998). SIU Press. ISBN 0-8093-2156-4
