= Frank Ray Perilli =

American actor (1925–2018)

- Born: August 30, 1925; Chicago, Illinois, United States
- Died: March 8, 2018 (aged 92); Los Angeles, California, United States
- Occupations: Film director, film producer, actor, screenwriter
- Spouse: Julia Mastrantonio (1927–2010, 1 son Marco)

Frank Ray Perilli (August 30, 1925 – March 8, 2018) was an American screenwriter with more than 15 screen credits, and a playwright of four stage plays. He began his career as a standup comic in the mob-controlled nightclubs of Chicago's North Side, and made appearances on major television shows of the day such as The Ed Sullivan Show. His acting career included more than a dozen feature films, some of which he wrote and/or produced. He was also a comedy writer for Don Rickles, Shecky Greene, and Lenny Bruce, among others, and at times a manager for Greene and Bruce. His biography, The Candy Butcher by William Karl Thomas, was released in 2016 by Media Maestro-Book Division.

He is known for such films as She Came to the Valley, End of the World, Laserblast, Mansion of the Doomed and Alligator.

== Actor ==
He had a role as a jail officer in the 1993 film The Fugitive. In 1995, he played the role of BJ in Steal Big Steal Little.

== Writer ==
Along with Franne Schacht, he wrote the story for Laserblast which starred Kim Milford, Cheryl Smith, Gianni Russo, and Roddy McDowall. He has also worked with Michael Pataki on more than one occasion.

=== Work with Albert Band ===
Perilli has worked with director Albert Band on more than one occasion. With Louis A. Garfinkle, he wrote the story for the 1973 film Little Cigars which Chris Christenberry directed and Albert Band produced. It starred Angel Tompkins as a beautiful lady who teamed up with a group of midgets. More work with Band came in 1977, with Dracula's Dog. They also worked together on the western She Came to the Valley. In 1993, it was Joey Takes a Cab.

== Filmography ==
Actor
Title	Role	Director	Year	Notes #
Cinderella	Italian Ambassador	Michael Pataki	1977	
End of the World	Awards Party Guest	John Hayes	1977	
Fairy Tales	Baron	Harry Hurwitz	1978	
She Came to the Valley	Emilio	Albert Band	1979	
Three of Hearts	Patient	Yurek Bogayevicz	1993	
The Fugitive	Jail Officer	Andrew Davis	1993	
Steal Big Steal Little	E.J.	Andrew Davis	1995	
Wedding Crashers	Old Italian Man	David Dobkin	2005	Credited as Frankie Ray Perelli

Writer
Title	Director	Year	Notes #
The Doberman Gang	Byron Chudnow	1972	Original story and screenplay
Little Cigars	Chris Christenberry	1973	Co-written with Louis A. Garfinkle
Last Foxtrot in Burbank	Charles Band	1973	Co-written with Bill Haggard, Sam Vaughn and Louis A. Garfinkle
Mansion of the Doomed	Michael Pataki	1976	
Cinderella	Michael Pataki	1977	
End of the World	John Hayes	1977	
Dracula's Dog	Albert Band	1977	Screenplay
Laserblast	Michael Rae	1978	Co-written with Franne Schacht
Land of No Return	Kent Bateman	1978	
Fairy Tales	Harry Hurwitz	1978	Co-written with Franne Schacht
She Came to the Valley	Albert Band	1979	Screenplay co-written with Albert Band
Alligator	Lewis Teague	1980	Co-written with John Sayles, also John Sayles (screenplay)
Joey Takes a Cab	Albert Band	1991	
The Best of Sex and Violence (documentary)	Ken Dixon	1981	
Steal Big Steal Little	Andrew Davis	1995	Story

Producer
Title	Director	Year	Notes #
Dracula's Dog	Albert Band	1977	Co-producer Albert Band, executive producer Philip Collins
She Came to the Valley	Albert Band	1979	Co-producer Albert Band, executive producer Robert S. Bremson, associate producers T.L. Duncan, W.T. Ellis
