= Stella Garcia =

American actress active 1960-1997

- Born: Los Angeles, California, U.S.
- Occupation: Actress
- Years active: 1960–1997

Stella Garcia is an American actress who appeared in the films The Private Lives of Adam and Eve, Change of Habit, The Last Movie, and Joe Kidd.

== Career ==
=== Early roles ===
Garcia's first film role was in the early 1960s in The Private Lives of Adam and Eve. In 1963, she had a small part in the Elvis Presley film Fun in Acapulco as the Señorita at Torito's.

=== Success ===
At the beginning of the 1970s, she was cast in the film The Last Movie (1971), which was the second directorial effort for Dennis Hopper, who had just finished Easy Rider. In the film she played Hopper's girlfriend, and the review from Variety included positive recognition for her part in the movie. Soon after, she was cast by Universal Studios as the female lead in the western Joe Kidd (1972), starring Clint Eastwood. She played Helen Sanchez, a Mexican-American activist and lover of Luis Chama, played by John Saxon. Her performance received positive reviews, especially from the Los Angeles Times. Despite the attention she attracted for The Last Movie and Joe Kidd, her acting career subsequently began to decline. She appeared in one other film during the 1970s, the Albert Band-directed She Came to the Valley, as a Christmas party guest.

=== Later years ===
In 1996, she played the part of Maria in the film Eye for an Eye which starred Sally Field and Kiefer Sutherland. Her final film role was in 1997, as a South African businesswoman in the film Playing God.

She attended the April 25, 2014 screening of Dennis Hopper's The Last Movie at Paramount Studios, Hollywood, California. Garcia arrived at the event with Jodi Wille, director of the documentary The Source Family.

== Filmography ==
Title	Year	Role	Director	Notes
The Private Lives of Adam and Eve	1960	Friday	Mickey Rooney, Albert Zugsmith	
Fun in Acapulco	1963	Señorita at Torito's	Richard Thorpe	Uncredited
Change of Habit	1969	Singer	William Graham	drama; Uncredited
The Last Movie	1971	Maria	Dennis Hopper	Uncredited, Recognition for her role in a review from Variety
Joe Kidd	1972	Helen Sanchez	John Sturges	Positive reviews, incl. one from LA Times.
She Came to the Valley	1973	Christmas Party Guest #20	Albert Band	
Eye for an Eye	1996	Maria	John Schlesinger	
Playing God	1997	South African Businesswoman	Andy Wilson	(final film role)
