= Land of No Return =

1978 American thriller film

- Directed by: Kent Bateman
- Written by: Kent Bateman
- Produced by: Kent Bateman
- Starring: Mel Torme; William Shatner; Donald Moffat
- Narrated by: Frank Ray Perilli
- Cinematography: João Fernandes
- Music by: Ralph Geddes
- Distributed by: The International Picture Show Company
- Release date: 1978
- Running time: 84 minutes
- Country: United States
- Language: English

Land of No Return is a 1978 thriller film written, directed, and produced by Kent Bateman, father of Jason and Justine Bateman. The film stars Mel Torme and William Shatner.

The film was shot in Utah and released theatrically by The International Picture Show Company, whose president at the time was Lloyd Adams Jr.

Alternate titles for the film include Challenge to Survive and Snowman.

== Plot ==
Zak O'Brien (Mel Torme) is an animal trainer for the popular television series Caesar & Romulus, which has been selected for a "Patsy" Award to be presented in Burbank, California. Zak, along with Caesar (a golden eagle), and Romulus (a wolf), board his personal plane in Denver for the flight to Burbank, but en route at night over the Utah wastelands, they encounter a sudden blizzard. When Zak's radio and engine fail, he guides the craft down to a crash landing. All three passengers survive, but the plane is destroyed and a struggle for survival begins.

== Production ==
Parts of the film were shot in Utah.
