= Sol Marroquin =

- Born: Salomon Silva Marroquin; January 23, 1931; San Antonio, Texas
- Died: September 19, 2018 (aged 87); Mission, Texas
- Other names: Actor, former chief of staff to Kika de la Garza, Democratic representative for the 15th congressional district of Texas
- Years active: 1960s - 2000s

Sol Marroquin was an actor and author. He was also a former aide to Kika de la Garza a Democratic representative of Texas.

== Background ==
Originally from San Antonio, Marroquin moved to Mission in 1939 with his family. In the early 1950s during the Korean war, he signed up to the air force and served for four years. Later he spent 18 years with the Air Force Reserves and at the time of his discharge as Master Sergeant, he had spent a total of 22 years in service. He is also known as Salomon Marroquin.

He was the first Hispanic to hold he was the hospital administrator in valley area. In 1970 he was the administrator at the Mission Municipal Hospital in Texas.

Around 1977, Marroquin became Kika de La Garza's assistant. He ended up working with de la Garza for 21 years.

His book Part of the Team (Story of an American Hero) which was published in 1979 relates to Freddy Gonzalez.

== Actor ==
=== 1960s ===
Some of the film roles that Marroquin appeared in were while he was still working as for Kika de la Garza and also when he was chief of staff.

After Marroquin left the army in the late 1950s, he moved to Los Angeles and attended the Hollywood School of Drama. He appeared in 30 plus plays, with most of his roles being small parts. In 1960 he played the part of a gambling bookie in the film Get Outta Town aka The Day Kelly Came Home. In 1964, appeared in the original film The Thin Red Line. He actually had more than one role in the film.

=== 1970s ===
In 1977, he played the part of Ranchero Rico in the Gilberto Martínez Solares directed film Caballo prieto afamado. In the late 1970s he had a role in the Albert Band produced western, She Came to the Valley playing the part of Colonel Vaccaro. The film featured Freddy Fender as Pancho Villa. He helped arrange a trip in January 1979 for Maria Luz Corral de Villa, the widow of Pancho Villa to come to Texas to seek a pardon for her husband from Kika de la Garza.

=== 2000s ===
In 2004, the short film Dancing with the Devil was released. Both himself and Melinda Marroquin produced and acted in the film which is about a young religious woman who had been betrayed by her fiancé and taken for a night out by her friends and encounters a handsome stranger who isn't as he appears. The film appears to be based on an event that took place some years before. Two festivals it was shown at were the Rio Grande Valley's Latino film festival, CineSol and the San Antonio Underground Film Festival. Decades later he was photographed with She Came to the Valley associate producer Maurine Duncun, both of them holding the hats they wore in the movie. In 2007, he played Senor Guerra in the Javier Chapa directed film Harvest of Redemption.

== Author ==
- Part of the team: Story of an American hero - (1979)

== Filmography ==
Film
Title	Role	Director	Year	Notes #
Get Outta Town	Gambling Bookie	Charles Davis	1960	
The Thin Red Line	Soldier in hero's platoon	Andrew Marton	1964	Played additional part. Credited as actor Solomon Silva
Caballo prieto afamado	Ranchero Rico	Gilberto Martínez Solares	1977	
She Came to the Valley	Colonel Vaccaro	Albert Band	1977	Crew: Spanish dialogue
Dancing with the Devil	The Doctor	Melinda Marroquin	2004	Also associate producer
Harvest of Redemption	Senor Guerra	Javier Chapa	2007	
