= Brett Smiley =

Brett Smiley may refer to:

- Brett Smiley (singer) (1955–2016), American singer
- Brett Smiley (politician) (born 1979), American politician
