= Lindsay Maracotta =

American novelist

Lindsay Maracotta is an American author of eleven novels, including the mass market bestsellers Everything We Wanted, published by Random House, and The Dead Hollywood Moms Society, published by William Morrow. She has served as a producer on several films, including a Hallmark Channel movie based on her Dead Hollywood mystery series entitled Hollywood Mom's Mystery, starring Justine Bateman and Andrew McCarthy. She also wrote for the Ace Award-winning HBO series The Hitchhiker and has written scripts for Disney, Paramount, Warner Bros. and for such stars as Goldie Hawn and Jessica Lange. Previous to this, she was a freelance writer, contributing articles to numerous publications including Harper’s, Playboy, The Los Angeles Times, and Vogue. Her newest book, The Producer's Daughter (written as Lindsay Marcott) was published in 2015.

In 2016, Maracotta began teaching writing at UCLA.

A native of Manhattan and a graduate of Smith College, Maracotta lives with her husband, a film producer, in the Hollywood Hills.

== Bibliography ==
- The Sad Eyed Ladies (1978)
- Angel Dust (1979)
- Caribe (1980)
- Hide & Seek (1982)
- Everything We Wanted (1984)
- The Dead Hollywood Moms Society (1996)
- The Dead Celeb (1997)
- Playing Dead (1998)
- To Catch a Husband (as Lindsay Graves) (2006)
- To Keep a Husband (as Lindsay Graves) (2007)
- The Producer's Daughter (as Lindsay Marcott) (2015)

The Dead Hollywood Moms Society and its two sequels were reprinted in 2014 as the "Dead is the New Fabulous Series" and were retitled Fabulously Dead, Dazzle Me Dead, and Adorably Dead, respectively.
