= The Headless Eyes =

- Promotional poster
- Directed by: Kent Bateman
- Written by: Kent Bateman
- Produced by: Ron Sullivan (as Henri Pachard)
- Starring: Bo Brundin; Ramon Gordon; Kelly Swartz; Ann Wells
- Production company: Laviniaque Films
- Distributed by: J.E.R. Pictures; Cinema Shares International Distribution
- Release date: October 27, 1971
- Running time: 78 minutes
- Country: United States
- Language: English

The Headless Eyes is a 1971 American exploitation horror film written and directed by Kent Bateman and produced by Ron Sullivan (credited as Henri Pachard).

== Plot ==
The film depicts an artist named Arthur Malcolm (Bo Brundin) who sneaks into a woman's bedroom and tries to steal money from her nightstand to pay his rent. Mistaking the thief for a rapist, the woman gouges out his eye with a spoon from her evening tea and knocks him out of a second-story window. After being gawked at with his eye dangling from its socket and suffering the ultimate loss of his eye, Arthur becomes a serial killer and uses his victims' eyes in his artwork.

== Cast ==
- Bo Brundin as Arthur Malcolm
- Gordon Ramon
- Kelley Swartz
- Mary Jane Early

== Production ==
The film was produced by Ron Sullivan (credited as Henri Pachard), a cinematographer with a background in pornographic films. The film's director, Kent Bateman, is the father of actors Justine and Jason Bateman.

== Release ==
The film was distributed by J.E.R. Pictures, an independent company based in Times Square, New York City, which paired it as a double feature with The Ghastly Ones (1968). It opened in Canandaigua, New York, on October 27, 1971, as part of this double feature. Although it received an X rating due to violence, the film was a box-office success.

=== Home media ===
The film was released on DVD by Wizard Video on July 16, 2013. Code Red released a Blu-ray edition of the film, featuring two alternate cuts, on December 6, 2016.

== Reception ==
Joseph A. Ziemba from Bleeding Skull! gave the film a positive review, writing: "Unkempt and gloomy, yet somehow radiant, the mind-bending Headless Eyes is a touchpoint for every element that makes nonconformist 70s trash-horror cinema so enduring today. As soon as 'The End' rolls around, you’ll want to watch it again." On his website Fantastic Movie Musings and Ramblings, Dave Sindelar gave the film a negative review, calling it "pointless, pretentious, annoying, and no fun at all".

Film scholars Bill Landis and Michelle Clifford, writing in Sleazoid Express (2002), note that The Headless Eyes features murder scenes choreographed with the pacing of slow-moving sexual assaults, reflecting the psychosexual themes inherent in blood horror. They conclude that the film secures its place in the exploitation genre due to its isolated, unconventional, and discordant qualities, mirroring those of its protagonist.

== Sources ==
- Landis, Bill; Clifford, Michelle (2002). Sleazoid Express: A Mind-Twisting Tour Through the Grindhouse Cinema of Times Square. New York: Simon & Schuster. ISBN 978-0-743-21583-1.
