= Will Cook (writer) =

William Everett Cook
- Born: 28 January 1922
- Died: 23 July 1964 (aged 42)
- Occupation: Novelist
- Writing career
- Pen name: Will Cook, Frank Peace, James Keene, Wade Everett
- Period: 1950–64
- Genre: Western fiction

William Everett Cook (January 28, 1922 – July 23, 1964), was a western writer who used the pen names Will Cook, James Keene, Wade Everett and Frank Peace. Called "a master western storyteller," Cook published dozens of short stories and 50 novels before his death at age 42. A number of his stories and novels were turned into Hollywood westerns, including the 1961 John Ford film Two Rode Together.

== Life ==
William Edward Cooke was born to Lillian A. and Shubel S. Cooke on January 28, 1922 in Richmond, Indiana, His mother died in February 1922. He was adopted by relatives James Fred Cook and Carrie Lucy Hummer in who raised him in Cambridge, Illinois as William Everett Cook.

Cook ran away from home at age 16 and joined the U.S. Army cavalry before serving as a pilot in the Pacific during World War II. During the war he was severely wounded in the leg but later returned to active duty. He was awarded the Silver Star, Purple Heart, Combat Infantryman Badge, and Air medal with oak leaf cluster for his service.

After the war Cook worked as a salvage worker, judo instructor, a bush pilot in Alaska, and as a deputy sheriff in California. Cook died of a heart attack in 1964 while building a schooner in which he and his wife Thea hoped to sail around the world.

== Writing career ==
Cook started writing westerns in 1951 and published 100 short stories and 50 novels before dying at the age of 42.

In 1959, Cook used the penname Wade Everett for a series of paperbacks released by Ballantine Books, with these novels being reprinted numerous times over the following decades. Among these was The Last Scout, published in 1960 and considered one of his best novels. The novel is about an unrepentant hell raiser who comes to Deadwood to live with his daughter's family. Other notable books of his include The Wind River Kid (Fawcett, 1958), where the main character of The Last Scout is now a drunk who gets thrown into the job of sheriff, and The Wranglers (Fawcett, 1960), about an older horse-breaker and his partner who travel to monument country in Southern Utah while dealing with personal issues.

Publishers Weekly called Cook "a master western storyteller. His fiction frequently featured the use of "recurring characters to link otherwise standalone stories," as shown in his collection of novellas The Devil's Roundup, which Booklist called "One of the best posthumous western collections to be offered in many years. Most of his books deal with traditional western themes of reformed outlaws, range wars and fights with Native Americans, but some also focused on romance.

After Cook's death a number of posthumous books by him were released. In addition, his Everett byline had become valuable enough that Ballantine Books turned it into a house name for novels written by other authors. Among these was 1968's The Whiskey Traders, which was released under the Everett byline but written by Giles A. Lutz.

Many of Cook's short stories including "A Gunman Came to Town" were published in The Saturday Evening Post.

Cook's archives are held in the University of Oregon Libraries.

Will Cook was a member of the Redwood Writers Club while living in Vallejo, California. He was a featured speaker for National Poetry Day in 1952, and became the club's president in 1958. His wife, Thea, was president in 1957.

== Hollywood adaptations ==
Cook's first novel, the 1954 Frontier Feud was filmed as Quincannon, Frontier Scout (1956). His 1959 novel Comanche Captives inspired the 1961 John Ford film Two Rode Together, with the novel being re-released that year as a movie tie-in by Bantam Books in the United States and as a hardcover in the United Kingdom. His 1958 novel Guns of North Texas was filmed as the Spaghetti Western The Tramplers (1965).

In addition, Cook's stories and novels were also adapted into a number of other Hollywood westerns including episodes of the TV shows Cheyenne, Bronco, and Dick Powell's Zane Grey Theatre.

== Bibliography ==
=== As Frank Peace ===
==== Single novels ====
- Easy Money (1955)
- The Brass Brigade (1956)
- Bandit's Trail (1974)

==== Omnibus collection ====
- The Outlaw's Revenge: And Other Bible Mystery Stories for Boys and Girls (1950)

=== As Will Cook ===
==== Single novels ====
- Frontier Feud (1954)
- Prairie Guns (1954)
- Fury at Painted Rock (1955)
- Sabrina Kane (1955)
- Trumpets to the West (1956)
- Apache Ambush (1958)
- Badman's Holiday (1958)
- Elizabeth, by Name aka The Crossing (1958)
- Guns of North Texas (1958)
- The Wind River Kid (1958)
- Comanche Captives (1959, with an excerpt published as a short story in the Saturday Evening Post)
- The Outcasts (1959)
- Killer behind a Badge (1960)
- Outcast of Cripple Creek (1960)
- The Wranglers (1960)
- The Peacemakers (1961)
- Two Rode Together (1961)
- The Breakthrough (1963)
- The Tough Texan (1963)
- Last Command (1964)
- Ambush at Antlers Spring (1967)
- The Apache fighter (1967)
- The Drifter (1969)
- The Rain Tree (1996)
- The Last Scout (1997)
- The Devil's Roundup (2002)

==== A Saga of Texas ====
1. Until Day Breaks (1999)
2. Until Shadows Fall (2000)
3. Until Darkness Disappears (2001)

=== As Wade Everett ===
Wade Everett was a pseudonym used by Cook for some of his western novels. After Cook died in 1964, his Everett byline had become valuable enough that Ballantine Books turned it into a house name for novels written by other authors, including Giles A. Lutz.

- First Command (1959)
- Fort Starke (1959)
- Last Scout (1960)
- Big Man, Big Mountain (1961)
- Killer (1962)
- The Big Drive (1962)
- Shotgun Marshal (1964)
- Texas Ranger (1964)
- Top Hand 1964)
- Bullets for the Doctor (1965)
- Cavalry Recruit (1965)
- Texas Yankee (1966)
- The Warrior (1967)
- Vengeance (1967)
- The Whiskey Traders (1968)
- Temporary Duty (1969)
- Wind River Kid (1974)
- Lone Hand from Texas (1992)
- Bullet Range (1993)
- The Fighting Texan (1993)

=== As James Keene ===
James Keene was a pseudonym used by William Everett Cook to write western novels. After his death other authors including Ida Cook used the name.

- The Texas Pistol (1955)
- The Brass and the Blue (1956)
- Justice, My Brother! (1957)
- Seven for Vengeance (1958)
- McCracken in Command (1959)
- The Posse from Gunlock (1959)
- Gunman's Harvest (1960)
- Iron Man, Iron Horse (1960)
- Sixgun Wild (1960)
- Gunnison's Empire (1963)
- Broken Gun (1964)
- The Horse Trader (1964)

== See also ==
- James Keene
