= Max Band =

Lithuanian artist (1901–1974)

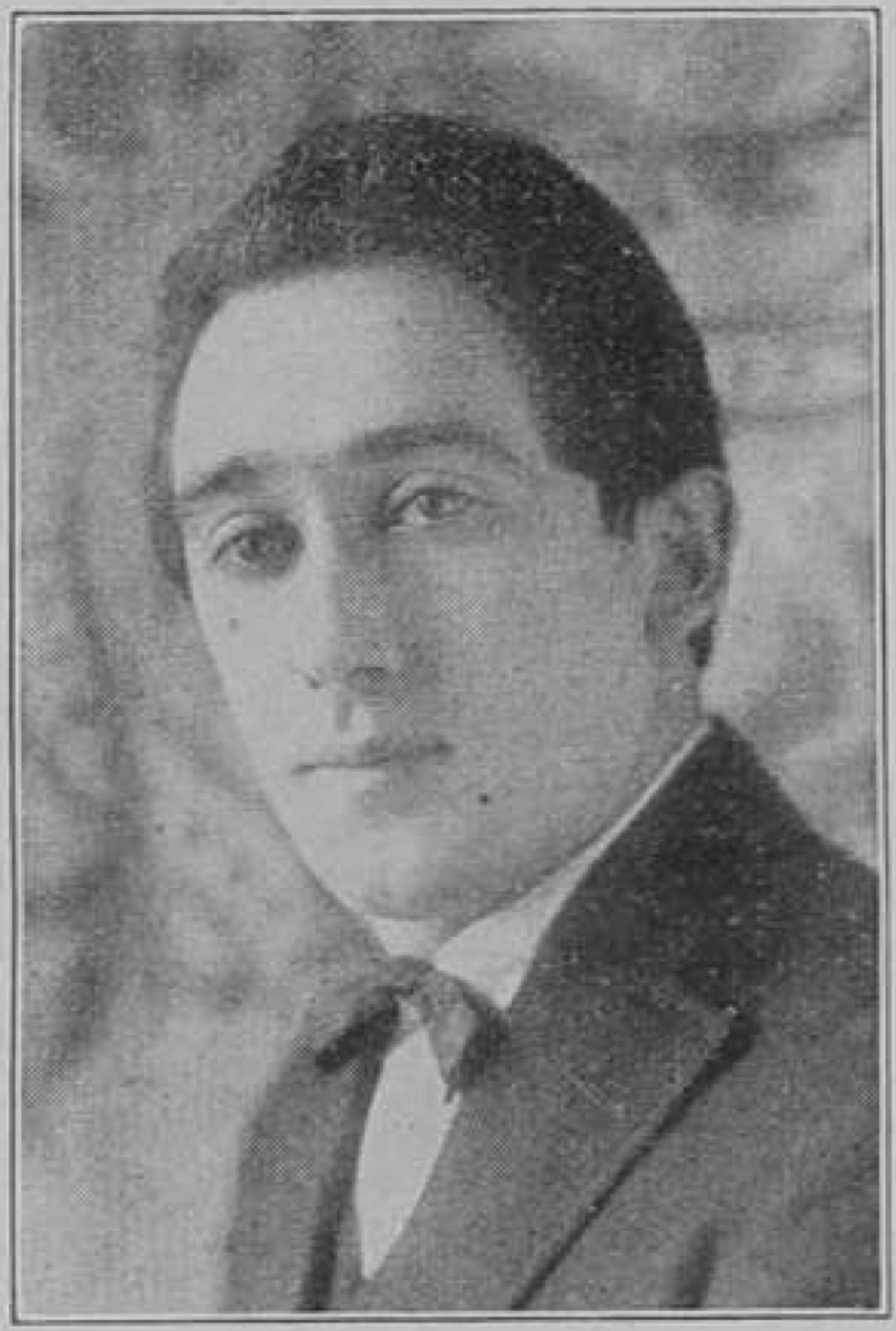

Max Band (21 August 1901 – 8 November 1974) was a Litvak landscape artist born in Kudirkos Naumiestis, Lithuania, the son of Abraham K. Band and Anna Tumpowsky.

Band enrolled in an art school in Berlin in 1920, and he then lived in Paris from 1922 to 1940. He held his first exhibit in New York in 1927, and he was commissioned to paint a portrait of President Roosevelt in 1934. Band moved to California in 1940. He was the father of the director Albert Band, grandfather of the filmmaker Charles Band, and great-grandfather of the singer/songwriter Alex Band. He died in Hollywood and is buried in Los Angeles.

Aside from painting, Band wrote the art guide History of Contemporary Art (1935).
