= Quincannon, Frontier Scout =

1956 film by Lesley Selander

- Theatrical release poster
- Directed by: Lesley Selander
- Screenplay by: John C. Higgins; Don Martin
- Based on: Frontier Feud by Will Cook
- Produced by: Howard W. Koch
- Starring: Tony Martin; Peggie Castle; John Bromfield; John Smith; Ron Randell
- Cinematography: Joseph F. Biroc
- Edited by: John F. Schreyer
- Music by: Les Baxter
- Production company: Bel-Air Productions
- Distributed by: United Artists
- Release date: May 1956
- Running time: 83 minutes
- Country: United States
- Language: English
- Budget: $250,000

Quincannon, Frontier Scout is a 1956 American Western film directed by Lesley Selander and written by John C. Higgins and Don Martin. The film stars Tony Martin, Peggie Castle, John Bromfield, John Smith and Ron Randell. The film was released in May 1956, by United Artists.

== Plot ==
Linus Quincannon, formerly a captain in the 7th Cavalry and a fine scout, left the Army in disgust over the way the Indians were being treated by the government before the Battle of the Little Bighorn, in particular at the Battle of Washita. His former commanding officer, Colonel Conover, calls him back to duty to help him solve the mystery of how the Arapahoes had learned of a secret shipment of Henry repeating rifles and ammunition intended to arm the troopers of his regiment, and stolen them. Quincannon's old company sergeant, Sergeant Calvin, and a wet-behind-the-ears West Pointer on his first tour of duty in the West, Lt. Burke, locate Quinny and pinion him so the Colonel can talk to him. He reluctantly agrees to accept the mission.

Things are complicated by the presence of Maylene Mason, a spirited blonde from the East who has come to the frontier to determine the fate of her brother, who was probably killed during the raid in which the rifles were stolen. The Colonel puts her under Quincannon's command, with orders to bring her to the fort commanded by Captain Bell, where her brother had been stationed. The four set out for Fort Smith.

On the way, they encounter a Crow hunting party being stalked by an Arapaho, and kill the stalker. The Crows warn Quincannon the Arapahos are on the warpath and hoping to make common cause with the Sioux and the Cheyenne to start a major war. Quincannon has his party ditch their saddles, ride bareback, dress like Indians, and to the disgust of Maylene, dye their skin so from a distance they look like Indians. Quinny talks his way past the one war band they see. Along the way, when asked by his blonde charge why he has never married, he explains he could not afford to pay the number of ponies a bride from one of the tribes would cost, and tells Maylene she would be worth twenty fine ponies, which makes her laugh.

On reaching Fort Smith, Maylene is saddened to have the death of her brother confirmed by Captain Bell. Bell himself was surprised to learn of the secret shipment of rifles from Quincannon; Colonel Conover had not told him about it. Quincannon, Burke, and Calvin do some quiet investigating, and discover that Bell's second-in-command, Lieutenant Hostedder, is in possession of $2,000 in gold coins stolen from an Army paymaster by the Arapahoes. Quincannon, who has a carte blanche from Conover in connection to his mission, arrests Hostedder. Bell brings Hostedder to his office to "question" him – the two of them were in cahoots with an Arapaho chief, Iron Wolf, who stole the rifles to become the leader of the rebellious tribes – and murders him before he can squeal. Leaving Maylene at Fort Bell, Quincannon, Burke, and Calvin go in search of a fur trader and whiskey peddler, Blackfoot Sam, who may give them an "in" with the tribes who are on the warpath.

They find Blackfoot Sam, who tries and fails to ambush them but wounds Burke. After wiping out Sam's trading party and patching up the wounded Burke, Quinny and Calvin infiltrate Iron Wolf's camp using Sam's whiskey as an entree, locate the stolen repeaters, and blow them up before fleeing. Iron Wolf chases the trio to an abandoned fort, loses a number of his braves, and is captured by Quincannon.

Captain Bell catches up with Quincannon and his men at the abandoned fort. When Bell accuses Quincannon of being the mastermind behind the theft of the Henrys, Quincannon brings Iron Wolf out from where he had been imprisoned, and asks him to point out the white man who had been his partner in the theft. Iron Wolf points to Bell, and Quincannon arrests him.

Back at Fort Smith, the romance between Maylene and Quinny comes to a head when string-pulling by Colonel Conover pays off. A telegram comes from the War Department reinstating Linus Quincannon's commission in the Cavalry and promoting him to Major. With Quinny now in a position to afford a bride, Maylene asks him if she is still worth twenty fine ponies, and he accepts her proposal by passionately kissing her.

== Cast ==
- Tony Martin as Linus Quincannon
- Peggie Castle as Maylene Mason
- John Bromfield as Lt. Burke
- John Smith as Lt. Phil Hostedder
- Ron Randell as Capt. Bell
- John Doucette as Sgt. Major Calvin
- Morris Ankrum as Col. Harry Conover
- Peter Mamakos as Blackfoot Sam
- Edmund Hashim as Iron Wolf
- Tom London as Livery Stableman (uncredited)

== Production ==
The script was based on a 1954 novel by Will Cook, called Frontier Feud. It was his first book. Film rights were bought by Bel Air Productions who signed Tony Martin to play the lead. It was Martin's first non musical lead role.

Parts of the film were shot in Kanab Canyon in Utah, as well as in Pipe Springs, Arizona. (The same producers then filmed The Girl in Black Stockings in that area.)

Filing started 11 August 1955 under the title Frontier Scout.

By December 1955 filming had ended and the same producers announce Martin would appear in Bandit in Black but this film was not made.

== Reception ==
Variety said it had "regulation, and stilted, frontier action... Martin is not cut out for the type of histrionics required of for the lead role."
