= Two Rode Together =

1961 film by John Ford

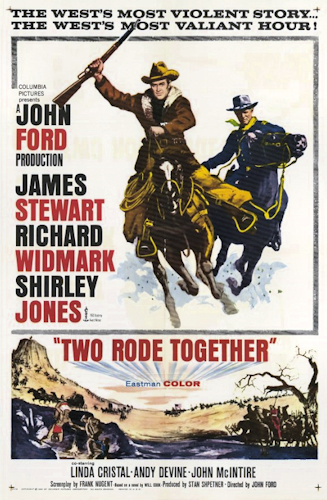
- 1961 film poster by Howard Terpning
- Directed by: John Ford
- Screenplay by: Frank Nugent
- Based on: Comanche Captives by Will Cook
- Produced by: Stan Shpetner
- Starring: James Stewart; Richard Widmark; Shirley Jones; Linda Cristal; Andy Devine; John McIntire
- Cinematography: Charles Lawton Jr.
- Edited by: Jack Murray
- Music by: George Duning
- Color process: Eastman Color
- Production companies: John Ford Productions; Shpetner Productions
- Distributed by: Columbia Pictures
- Release date: June 28, 1961
- Running time: 109 minutes
- Country: United States
- Language: English
- Box office: $1.6 million

Two Rode Together is a 1961 American Western film directed by John Ford and starring James Stewart, Richard Widmark, and Shirley Jones. The supporting cast includes Linda Cristal, Andy Devine, and John McIntire. The film was based upon the 1959 novel Comanche Captives by Will Cook.

== Plot ==
Guthrie McCabe is living the good life as Tuscosa town marshal, supplementing his income with a percentage of the profits of local businesses, including the saloon run by his mistress, Belle. Meanwhile, the white relatives of Comanche captives, including frontierswoman Marty Purcell, arrive at the territorial army fort and demand that the American army find their lost loved ones. The fort commander, U.S. Cavalry officer Major Frazer, uses a combination of military pressure and financial incentives to coax ex-scout McCabe to ransom any white captives he can find. He assigns Lt. Jim Gary, a friend of McCabe's, to accompany him. They travel into Comanche territory, where McCabe and Gary bargain with Chief Quanah Parker and find four white captives. Two women, Freda Knudsen and Hannah Clegg, refuse to go back, but McCabe and Gary succeed in returning with a teenaged boy named Running Wolf and a Mexican woman, Elena de la Madriaga. Elena is the wife of Stone Calf, a militant rival of Quanah's. In the evening, the two men leave the Indian camp. They split up, with each taking back their "rescued" captives: McCabe takes back Elena and Gary takes back Running Wolf. In the evening in camp, McCabe now alone with Elena, senses that Stone Calf is in the vicinity and that he is in great danger. At the campfire, McCabe positions Elena next to him and puts his arm around Elena to entice Stone Calf into action. When Stone Calf emerges from the bushes, McCabe draws his pistol and shoots him dead.

Back at the fort, both men have brought back their captives from the Indian camp, and a meeting run by the Major Frazer is convened. Running Wolf clearly hates white people, and no one will accept him, but a severely traumatized and broken woman, Mrs. Mary McCandless, is convinced that he is her long-lost son and claims him. When McCabe learns that Running Wolf has been given to McCandless, he tries to collect $1,000 from Harry Wringle, who refuses to pay for the wild and uncontrollable boy. McCabe, anxious for the money, then becomes arrogant with the major and is placed under military arrest. A little later, the major has McCabe brought in and explains that the killing of Stone Calf by McCabe has resulted in a situation where Quanah and the army can make a deal, which was problematical while Stone Calf was alive. As such, McCabe is released from detention and given an honorable discharge by the major.

In the evening, an officer's dance will take place before the settlers return home. In the meantime, McCabe becomes romantically involved with Elena, and Gary with Marty, with Gary proposing and Marty accepting at the dance.

As the dance continues, in the civilian encampment, Mrs. McCandless decides to set free Running Wolf, who has been tied to a wagon wheel. However, when she tries to cut his hair, he kills her. Meanwhile, back at the dance, Elena she finds herself ostracized by white society, deemed a woman who "degraded herself" by submitting to a savage rather than killing herself, which her Catholic faith forbade her to do. Now, she and McCabe have fallen in love, exemplified when he, backed by Gary, gives the soldiers and their wives a dressing down for their treatment of Elena.

At the civilian encampment, an impromptu trial presided over by Judge Purcell and a settler jury has decided to hang the boy; Lt. Gary's attempt to stop them fails as he is knocked unconscious. As the boy is being dragged off by a mob, Marty realizes to her horror that Running Wolf is her long-lost brother but is powerless to intervene (the boy has recognized the music box tune and shouted "Mine!" numerous times.)

Now, McCabe, accompanied by Elena, Lt. Gary and Sgt. Posey, arrives back in the town of Tuscosa, where McCabe plans to resume his position of marshal. However, McCabe discovers that Belle has taken his simple-minded deputy as a lover and got him elected to replace McCabe as marshal. After an extended humiliation by Belle ("news travels fast"), Elena decides to go to California on the next stagecoach, and McCabe, riding shotgun, happily decides to go with her. As they leave, Lt. Gary comments to Belle that his friend McCabe has "finally found something that he wants more than ten percent of."

== Cast ==
- James Stewart as Marshal Guthrie McCabe
- Richard Widmark as First Lieutenant Jim Gary
- Shirley Jones as Marty Purcell
- Linda Cristal as Elena de la Madriaga
- Andy Devine as Sergeant Darius P. Posey
- John McIntire as Major Frazer
- Paul Birch as Judge Edward Purcell
- Willis Bouchey as Mr. Harry J. Wringle
- Henry Brandon as Chief Quanah Parker
- Harry Carey Jr. as Ortho Clegg
- Olive Carey as Mrs. Abby Frazer
- Ken Curtis as Greeley Clegg
- Chet Douglas as Deputy Ward Corby
- Annelle Hayes as Belle Aragon
- David Kent as Running Wolf (Steve Purcell)
- Anna Lee as Mrs. Malaprop
- Jeanette Nolan as Mrs. Mary McCandless
- John Qualen as Ole Knudsen
- Ford Rainey as Reverend Henry Clegg
- Woody Strode as Stone Calf
- O.Z. Whitehead as Lieutenant Chase
- Regina Carrol as Freda Knudsen
- Mae Marsh as Hannah Clegg
- Rian Garrick as Lieutenant Upton

== Production ==
John Ford agreed to direct the film for money ($225,000 plus 25% of the net profits) and as a favor to Columbia Pictures head Harry Cohn, who died in 1958. The director hated the material, believing he had done a far better treatment of the theme in The Searchers (1956). Even after he brought in his most trusted screenwriter, Frank Nugent — the man responsible for The Searchers and nine other Ford classics — to fix the script, the director said it was "the worst piece of crap I’ve done in 20 years."

In Andrew Sinclair's 1979 biography, John Ford, Stewart revealed that Ford's "direction took the form of asides. Sometimes he'd put his hand across his mouth so that others couldn't hear what he was saying to you. On Two Rode Together, he told me to watch out for Dick Widmark because he was a good actor and that he would start stealing if I didn't watch him. Later, I learned he'd told Dick the same thing about me. He liked things to be tense."

One of the film's most notable scenes is a four-minute two-shot of Stewart and Widmark bantering on a river bank about money, women, and the Comanche problem. Ford shot the lengthy scene with his crew waist-deep in the chilly river.

The film was shot at the Alamo Village, the movie set originally created for John Wayne's The Alamo (1960).

Two Rode Together was the first of three Westerns that Stewart and Ford would collaborate on; The Man Who Shot Liberty Valance came the following year and Cheyenne Autumn was released in 1964. This film was also the fifteenth that Jack Murray would edit for Ford. It was also the last; Murray died a few months before the film's release.

== Critical reception ==
The film received mixed reviews. The Los Angeles Times described Two Rode Together as the "most disappointing western" of John Ford's career, while The New York Times praised James Stewart's performance as a career best.
