= Dracula's Dog =

1977 American horror film

- Theatrical release poster
- Directed by: Albert Band
- Written by: Frank Ray Perilli
- Based on: Hounds of Dracula by Ken Johnson
- Produced by: Philip Collins
- Starring: José Ferrer; Michael Pataki; Arlene Martel
- Cinematography: Bruce Logan
- Edited by: Harry Keramidas
- Music by: Andrew Belling
- Production company: Vic Productions
- Distributed by: Crown International Pictures (US); EMI Films (UK)
- Release dates: May 8, 1977 (UK); March 29, 1978 (US)
- Running time: 90 minutes
- Country: United States
- Language: English

Dracula's Dog, also known as Zoltan... Hound of Dracula, is a 1977 American supernatural horror film directed by Albert Band and starring Michael Pataki and José Ferrer. Its plot revolves around a Doberman Pinscher who is turned into a vampire by a member of Dracula’s family.

The film's screenplay by Frank Ray Perilli was the basis for the mass market paperback novel Hounds of Dracula (1977) by Ken Johnson, which was re-titled Dracula's Dog upon the film's release in the United States. In the United Kingdom, the novel was titled Zoltan...Hound of Dracula.

== Plot ==
The Romanian army accidentally blasts open a subterranean crypt, and the army captain, fearing looters and criminals, stations a guard near the site. Late in the night, an earthquake shakes loose one of the coffins, which slides down and lands at the feet of the confused guard. Curious as to what has fallen before him, the guard opens the coffin and discovers a dog's body, impaled by a wooden stake. He removes the stake, which revives the vampiric Doberman Pinscher Zoltan.

After slaying the guard and drinking his blood, Zoltan opens another coffin shaken loose from the crypt, this one holding the body of his master, an innkeeper named Veidt Smit. The crypt belongs to the Dracula family, all of whom are vampires. Zoltan removes the stake from the innkeeper's chest, re-animating him. The narrative then cuts to a flashback of a village in Romania in 1670, over 300 years ago.

The dog of an innkeeper saves a sleeping woman from being bitten by Count Igor Dracula. Furious over losing his victim to a dog, Dracula, in bat form, bites the dog, turning it into a vampire. Then Dracula, with the dog by his side, turns on the innkeeper, turning him into a "fractional lamia" (an undead creature that is only part vampire, able to function in the daytime and having no need to drink blood) who can be used as a slave.

Back in the present day, it appears that the Dracula family have only one surviving (mortal) descendant, Michael Drake, a psychiatrist, and (unknown to him) the image of Count Igor Dracula. He decides to take his wife Marla and their two children, Linda and Steve—as well as their two German Shepherds, Samson and Annie, and their two puppies—on vacation in the family's Winnebago camper.

The vampire dog and his master travel to the United States, shipping themselves via boat to Los Angeles, California, to make Michael their new master. Eventually, Zoltan and Smit find themselves in the same forest as Michael and his family.

Two fishermen, vacationing nearby with a Pointer called Buster, discover that Zoltan has bitten their dog. The Drakes' two dogs are also bitten and all the deceased dogs reanimate into vampire dogs, the minions of Zoltan. Veidt Smit and the four vampire dogs are all destroyed at the end of the film but, unknown to everyone involved, a vampire German Shepherd puppy (one of the two puppies belonging to the Drakes), that Zoltan had bitten previously, escapes destruction.

== Cast ==
- Michael Pataki as Michael Drake/Count Igor Dracula
- José Ferrer as Inspector Vaclav Branco
- Reggie Nalder as Veidt Smit
- Jan Shutan as Marla Drake
- Libby Chase as Linda Drake
- John Levin as Steve Drake
- Cleo Harington as Pat Parks
- Arlene Martel as Major Hessel
- Tom Gerrard as Maslow, the guard
- Dimitri Logothetis as an army corporal
- Roger Pancake as the sheriff
- Al Ferrara as the deputy

== Production ==
Dracula's Dog was produced under the working title Hounds of Dracula. The film was shot in Hollywood, California. Scenes taking place at the Dracula family's tomb were filmed on the former site of Griffith Park Zoo. The Port of Los Angeles was used as the port at which Veidt Smit and Zoltan arrive in California, and Lake Hollywood Park, which surrounds the Hollywood Reservoir, served as the location of the camping grounds.

Stan Winston served as the film's special makeup effects artist.

== Release ==
=== Theatrical run ===
The film received a theatrical release in the United Kingdom on May 8, 1977, under the title Zoltan... Hound of Dracula. It was released in the United States on March 29, 1978, as Dracula's Dog.

=== Home media ===
The film was released on VHS by Thorn EMI/HBO and United Home Video released under the titles Zoltan... Hound of Dracula and Dracula's Dog, respectively. Anchor Bay Entertainment released the film on DVD as Zoltan... Hound of Dracula on August 20, 2002.

== Reception ==
On the review aggregator website Rotten Tomatoes, the film has an approval rating of 17% based on six surveyed critics, with an average rating of 3.6/10. Michael Wilmington of the Los Angeles Times called it the nadir of vampire films. TV Guide rated it 1/5 stars and called the film's premise "ludicrous". Adam Tyner of DVD Talk rated it 2/5 stars and wrote that the film is too inept to be scary, though it is fun to mock. Writing in The Encyclopedia of Fantasy, John Clute and John Grant call it "surprisingly dull", but complimented the dogs. Welch Everman wrote in Cult Horror Movies that the film "could have been a pretty effective and frightening movie", but failed to live up to its potential.

== See also ==
- List of cult films
- List of vampire films

== Bibliography ==
- Smith, Gary A. (2017). Vampire Films of the 1970s: Dracula to Blacula and Every Fang Between. McFarland & Company. ISBN 9780786497799.
