= A Baltic Tragedy =

1970 film

- Directed by: Johan Bergenstråhle
- Written by: Johan Bergenstråhle; Per Olov Enquist; Staffan Lamm; Harald Stjerne
- Starring: Bo Brundin
- Cinematography: Petter Davidson
- Edited by: Staffan Lamm
- Release date: 30 September 1970
- Running time: 110 minutes
- Country: Sweden
- Language: Swedish

A Baltic Tragedy (Swedish: Baltutlämningen) is a 1970 Swedish drama film directed by Johan Bergenstråhle. It was entered into the 20th Berlin International Film Festival. The film is based on Per Olov Enquist's Legionärerna: En roman om baltutlämningen (1968; English title: The Legionnaires: A Documentary Novel), which itself is based on the Swedish extradition of Baltic soldiers to the Soviet Union that took place in 1946.

== Cast ==
- Bo Brundin as Eichfuss
- Yrjö Tähtelä as Lapa
- Anneli Sauli
- Knut Blom as Alksnis
- Jan Bergquist as actor
- Tore Lord as vicar
- Jonny Quantz
- Helge Skoog as actor
