= Satisfaction (1988 film) =

American comedy-drama film by Joan Freeman

- Theatrical release poster
- Directed by: Joan Freeman
- Written by: Charles Purpura
- Produced by: Aaron Spelling; Alan Greisman
- Starring: Justine Bateman; Liam Neeson
- Cinematography: Thomas Del Ruth
- Edited by: Joel Goodman
- Music by: Michel Colombier
- Production company: NBC Productions
- Distributed by: 20th Century Fox
- Release date: February 12, 1988
- Running time: 93 minutes
- Language: English
- Budget: $13 million
- Box office: $8,253,123

Satisfaction (also titled Girls of Summer) is a 1988 American comedy-drama film directed by Joan Freeman and starring Justine Bateman and Liam Neeson. Primarily known today as Julia Roberts' first credited big-screen role, Satisfaction is also one of the few theatrical productions by either Aaron Spelling or the NBC network.

== Plot ==
Jennie Lee, the lead singer of the all-girl Baltimore rock band The Mystery, gives the valedictorian speech at her high school graduation. The bass guitarist, Daryle, accepts a proposal from her high school sweetheart Frankie. The Mystery plan to go to Florida to audition for a gig at a nightclub for the summer. Jennie's older brother objects, thinking it will interfere with her college plans. The keyboardist has unexpectedly left the band, and their van was destroyed when drummer Mooch insulted a gang member. Jennie and guitarist Billie provide a borrowed van that is actually stolen from the gang member.

The band arrives in Florida with a male keyboard player named Nicky to find the nightclub closed. Fearing they missed their audition they seek out the house of the owner, Martin Falcon. They let themselves into his beach house and find he is gone. Billie sings to Hamlet, Falcon's pet Doberman, befriending him. When Falcon returns, drunk, confronts the band, and informs them they're in fact a day early. He offers them the room the winners will stay in for the summer, a converted tool shed with five cots.

The band passes the audition the next night and Falcon hires them for the summer. The band members are conspicious in the preppy beachside area, particularly Mooch who refuses to take off her black leather jacket. Daryle, already broken up with Frankie, dates a local rich boy and gets the band invited to his parties. Jennie encourages Mooch to spend time with Nicky, who has a crush on her. Jennie begins seeing the older Falcon, and he tells her a music agent friend who books European gigs is coming to watch the band perform. Falcon breaks up with Jennie when she expresses interest in moving in with him, saying he doesn't want her to give up opportunities because of him. Billie, over-reliant on medication to manager her depression, nearly overdoses, and Frankie starts a fight when he sees Daryle being ogled at the club.

The agent comes to the club, Jennie performs a song written by Falcon especially for the band and then runs off stage overcome by emotion, and the street gang catches up with Mooch. The band fights off the gang leader and Hamlet chases them from the club where the police take them into custody. Jennie tells the band the agent loved their music but she turned down his offer of a European tour. Nicky explains to the upset band members that the agent didn't want the whole band, and the offer was for Jennie to go overseas with studio musicians. Jennie prefers to stay with her band, says goodbye to Falcon, and they head home with Hamlet.

== Cast ==
- Justine Bateman as Jennie Lee
- Liam Neeson as Martin Falcon
- Trini Alvarado as "Mooch"
- Julia Roberts as Daryle
- Scott Coffey as Nickie
- Britta Phillips as Billy
- Debbie Harry as Tina
- Chris Nash as Frankie
- Michael DeLorenzo as "Bunny" Slotz
- Tom O'Brien as "Hubba"
- Steve Cropper as Sal

== Production ==
The film was a theatrical film made by NBC Productions, an offshoot of the NBC network, then under Brandon Tartikoff. It was a vehicle for Justine Bateman who was then on the network's popular sitcom Family Ties.

"I admire her courage to stand up there and sing," said Bateman's brother Jason, who was starring in the sitcom Valerie's Family at the time and had also just made his starring debut in a feature. "You can bet her movie is going to do better than [my feature] Teen Wolf Too." "The film is about that time in your life when you want to do something with your life within a creative environment in a constructive way," Bateman added.

Bateman took singing and guitar lessons and she and the cast rehearsed for six weeks. Filming took place in South Carolina. Bateman could not sing but said, "Luckily, we're just supposed to be a garage band because my voice is very far from Sarah Vaughan's."

Bateman's Family Ties co-star Michael J. Fox had recently made a rock movie called Light of Day. "The only similarity between the two movies is that both characters are in a band," said Bateman. "I wouldn't call Satisfaction light comedy, but it's . . . remember the Jodie Foster movie Foxes? It's similar to that feeling."

"I can't worry about 'changing my image' or whether I even have 'an image,'" said Bateman. "It's just me. I've done enough work that illustrates I'm just acting. Mallory [her character in Family Ties] is one character, the character in the film is another. I don't have any great plan, or feel that I need one. I feel I've balanced things pretty well. I try not to take myself too seriously. I'm 21, after all—you can't plan your life out till you're 80."

== Soundtrack ==
A soundtrack for the movie was released in 1988. Billed as being performed by Justine Bateman & The Mystery (as Jennie Lee & the Mystery in film credits), the instruments are actually performed by session players, with Bateman on lead vocals and co-star Britta Phillips on background vocals. The lead vocal on "Mr. Big Stuff" was sung by Phillips. The soundtrack also featured songs by other artists.

Track listing:

1. "(I Can't Get No) Satisfaction" – Justine Bateman & the Mystery
2. "Knock on Wood" – Justine Bateman & the Mystery
3. "Lies" – Justine Bateman & the Mystery
4. "Mr. Big Stuff" – Justine Bateman & the Mystery
5. "Rock and Roll Rebels" – John Kay & Steppenwolf
6. "Iko Iko" – Justine Bateman & the Mystery
7. "C'mon Everybody" – Justine Bateman & the Mystery
8. "Talk to Me" – Justine Bateman & the Mystery
9. "Mystery Dance" – Justine Bateman & the Mystery
10. "Maybe" – The Chantels
11. "Love Theme from Satisfaction" – Michel Columbier
12. "(I Can't Get No) Satisfaction (Version 2)" – Justine Bateman & the Mystery

== Reception ==
The film received poor reviews. The New York Times called it "a typical, low-budget summer movie, where everyone has a hot romance, a good body and an expensive haircut." The Los Angeles Times' critic Michael Wilmington called it "a movie—supposedly about an '80s rock band—where the songs date from the '60s, the language and sexual attitudes suggest the '70s and the plot is pure '50s." Movie historian Leonard Maltin seemed to agree: "Bombs like this one were more fun during the Baby Boomer era...Citing a lack of romantic chemistry between Neeson and Bateman would be much too polite." A DVD Talk reviewer said that it was "no wonder these gals can't get any satisfaction; their combined musical "talents" make Britney Spears look like Aretha Franklin, their clothes are freaking ridiculous, and they're stuck in a movie that looks precisely like a 'girls on vacation' episode of Beverly Hills 90210, or worse yet, a pre-teen version of Coyote Ugly."

The film opened at eighth place earning $2.3 million.

Satisfaction holds a 40% rating on Rotten Tomatoes based on five reviews.
