= Kirk Scott =

American film and television actor

- Scott in V, 1984
- Born: Dean Kirkland Dadisman Jr. June 7, 1936; Oklahoma, U.S.
- Died: November 16, 2013 (aged 77); San Luis Obispo, California, U.S.
- Education: Ohio State University
- Occupations: Film and television actor

Dean Kirkland Dadisman Jr. (June 7, 1936 – November 16, 2013) was an American film and television actor.

== Life and career ==
Scott was born in Oklahoma. He attended Ohio State University, earning his degree in theatre. After earning his degree, he served in the United States Army in Germany, where he entertained troops in numerous shows in Europe, which after his discharge, he moved to Los Angeles, California. He began his screen career in 1967, appearing in the CBS sitcom television series Petticoat Junction. In 1968, he appeared in the film Targets.

Later in his career, Scott guest-starred in television programs including The Dukes of Hazzard, Quantum Leap, V, Dynasty, The Fall Guy, Remington Steele and The Good Guys. In 1988, he played Dr. Stanley Marley in the CBS soap opera television series The Bold and the Beautiful. He also appeared in films such as Heathers (as Christian Slater's character father), Rich Girl, End of the World, Cinderella and The One Man Jury.

Scott retired from acting in 1993, last appearing in the television film Elvis and the Colonel: The Untold Story.

== Death ==
Scott died of cancer on November 16, 2013, in San Luis Obispo, California, at the age of 77.
