= Violet (2021 film) =

2021 film by Justine Bateman

- Theatrical release poster
- Directed by: Justine Bateman
- Written by: Justine Bateman
- Produced by: Justine Bateman; Larry Hummel; Michael D. Jones; Matt Paul
- Starring: Olivia Munn; Luke Bracey; Justin Theroux; Laura San Giacomo; Jason Dohring; Zachary Gordon; Todd Stashwick; Colleen Camp
- Cinematography: Mark Williams
- Edited by: Jay Friedkin
- Music by: VUM
- Production company: Section 5
- Distributed by: Relativity Media; Rogue Pictures
- Release dates: March 18, 2021 (SXSW); October 29, 2021
- Running time: 92 minutes
- Country: United States
- Language: English

Violet is a 2021 American drama film written, directed, and co-produced by Justine Bateman in her feature film directorial debut. It stars Olivia Munn, Luke Bracey and Justin Theroux.

Violet follows Violet Morton, a 32-year-old film executive who is living her life listening to her fear (“The Voice”). She has made these fear-based decisions to avoid potential “worst-case scenarios” in her romantic life, her family life, and her professional life. These decisions have taken her away from who she really is. She has grown accustomed to not being quite herself, and sees nothing amiss, until a friend’s comment makes her realize that The Voice has been lying to her, her entire life.

It had its world premiere at South by Southwest on March 18, 2021. It was released in theaters in a limited release on October 29, 2021, prior to video on demand on November 9, 2021, by Relativity Media and Rogue Pictures.

== Plot ==
Violet (Olivia Munn) is a successful head of production for a film company. She is at the mercy of The Voice, a perpetual male voice in her head (Justin Theroux) that keeps her deeply insecure by constantly articulating Violet's negative thoughts. The Voice impacts all of Violet's decisions personal and professional decisions, and discourages her from confiding in her friends. When Violet encounters ex-boyfried Martin Woods, The Voice tells her Martin finds her stupid and encourages her to insult him to level the playing field.

Violet's boss, Tom Gaines, compliments her on an earlier project called Fox Run, an experimental film based on a book of poetry. When Violet opens up about what she loves about the project he initially seems receptive, but later uses the information to denigrate her, revealing he will never back the film. Violet later confides to her childhood friend Red she is afraid of doing things wrong as it leaves her feeling unsafe and he encourages her to make mistakes. Violet begins defying The Voice. She apologizes to Martin for being rude, prompting him to apologize for his role in their breakup. She ignores the calls from the powerful film executive she had been seeing and begins a relationship with Red.

When Tom Gaines humiliates Violet revealing she was sleeping with the executive, Violet replies she is responsible for the success of his company. He fires her and she reaches out to financiers who are looking to expand into production. She becomes President of Production of a new company which sets out to make Fox Run into a film.

When her estranged mother dies, Violet realizes that there is no reason to fly to the funeral, as the majority of her family was cruel and abusive. Violet's brother calls her to confront her for missing the funeral, and she cuts him off. The Voice tells Violet she will be alone forever and then die. Violet realizes the voice is lying; she is finally free.

== Cast ==
- Olivia Munn as Violet
- Justin Theroux as The Voice
- Laura San Giacomo as Janice
- Jason Dohring as Harry White
- Zachary Gordon as Bradley
- Luke Bracey as "Red"
- Todd Stashwick as Rick
- Colleen Camp as Connie Campos
- Anne Ramsay as Vanessa
- Bonnie Bedelia as Aunt Helen
- Steve Agee as Boris
- Peter Jacobson as Roger Vale
- Rain Phoenix as Rita
- Dennis Boutsikaris as Tom Gains
- Rob Benedict as Fred Collins
- Jim O'Heir as Dennis Fitcher
- Jordan Belfi as Ron Moore
- Erica Ash as Lila
- Simon Quarterman as Martin Woods
- Al Madrigal as Darren Brightly
- Keith Powers as Keith

== Production ==
In March 2018, Olivia Munn and Justin Theroux had joined the cast of the film, with Justine Bateman directing from a screenplay she wrote. In July 2019, Luke Bracey joined the cast of the film. In August 2019, Jason Dohring, Zachary Gordon and Laura San Giacomo joined the cast of the film. In September 2019, Todd Stashwick joined the cast of the film.

Principal photography began in August 2019.

== Release ==
Violet had its world premiere at South by Southwest on March 18, 2021. It was previously set to hold its premiere at the festival the year before; however, it was cancelled due to the COVID-19 pandemic. In July 2021, Relativity Media acquired North American distribution rights to the film. The Exchange handled foreign sales for the film.

It had its international premiere at the 2021 Toronto International Film Festival on September 9, 2021. It was released in a limited release on October 29, 2021, prior to video on demand on November 9, 2021.

== Reception ==
On the review aggregator website Rotten Tomatoes, 82% of 78 critics' reviews are positive, with an average rating of 7.0/10. The website's consensus reads: "Uneven yet admirably ambitious, Violet takes a thoughtful look at the occasionally profound difference between a person's private thoughts and public face." Metacritic, which uses a weighted average, assigned the film a score of 61 out of 100, based on 13 critics, indicating "generally favorable" reviews.
