= She Came to the Valley =

1979 film

- Directed by: Albert Band
- Screenplay by: Frank Ray Perilli; Albert Band
- Story by: Cleo Dawson
- Based on: She Came to the Valley: A Novel of the Lower Rio Grande Valley, Mission Texas by Cleo Dawson
- Produced by: Albert Band
- Starring: Ronee Blakley; Dean Stockwell; Scott Glenn; Freddy Fender
- Cinematography: Daniel Pearl
- Edited by: Laurence Jacobs
- Music by: Tommy Leonetti
- Production company: R.G.V. Pictures
- Distributed by: R.G.V. Pictures
- Release date: January 1979 (Texas)
- Running time: 92 minutes
- Country: United States
- Language: English

She Came to the Valley is a western-genre film, shot in 1977 and released in 1979. Directed by Albert Band, it stars Ronee Blakley, Scott Glenn, Freddy Fender, and Dean Stockwell. It is based on a novel by Cleo Dawson.

== Plot ==
A poor family that leaves Oklahoma for Texas are persuaded by a drifter to move to the valley. It is discovered that the drifter is a supporter of the revolutionary leader Pancho Villa. The family become involved in a dispute between Pancho Villa's men and the government soldiers. Her husband later dies and she finds herself the subject of attention by a man called Bill who she learns is a gun runner for Villa. Pancho Villa was played by Freddy Fender.

== Cast ==
- Ronee Blakley as Willy Westall
- Dean Stockwell as Pat Westall
- Scott Glenn as Bill Lester
- Freddy Fender as Pancho Villa
- Anna Jones as Amara Westall
- Jennifer Jones as Srita Westall
- Rafael Flores Jr. as Benito Torres
- Les Brecht as Phil Allen
- Frank Benedetto as Captain Hernandez
- Sol Marroquin as Colonel Vaccaro
- Evelyn Guerrero as Connie
- Ruth Reeves as Miss Thirty Six
- Claus Eggers as Klaus
- Detlev Nitche as Zimmer
- Michael Hart as Henry
- Dan Willis as Mr. Courtnay
- John Hayes as Mr. Wright
- Jesús Sáenz as Mr. Torres
- Juanita Rutledge as Mrs. Torres
- Cindy Klein as Rosita
- Miriam Moroles as Carmella
- Martin Sanchez as Grandfather
- Cedric Wood as Sergeant Williams
- Robby Romero as Pepe
- Mary Alice Artes as Fanny
- Frank Ray Perilli as Emilio
- Cruz Quintana Jr. as Mexican Boy, Carpenter Assistant
- Cleo Dawson as Christmas Party Guest
- W.T. Ellis as Christmas Party Guest
- Maurine Duncan as Christmas Party Guest
- T.L. Duncan as Christmas Party Guest
- Elizabeth S. Wimberly as Christmas Party Guest
- Lucy Wallace McClelland as Christmas Party Guest
- Peggy Price as Christmas Party Guest
- Frank Strickland as Christmas Party Guest
- Pat Putnam as Christmas Party Guest
- Betty Lerma as Christmas Party Guest
- Jacquelyn Band as Christmas Party Guest
- Kathe Cunha as Christmas Party Guest
- Yolanda Gonzáles as Christmas Party Guest
- Richard Tedrow as Christmas Party Guest
- Curtis Davis as Christmas Party Guest
- Dorothy K. Breyfogle as Christmas Party Guest
- Claudio Flores as Christmas Party Guest
- Lenora Flores as Christmas Party Guest
- Minerva Black as Christmas Party Guest
- Stella Garcia as Christmas Party Guest
- Cora De La Garza as Christmas Party Guest
- Marc Perilli as Christmas Party Guest
- Ken Broughton as The Bartender

== Production ==
The film is a western set in 1915. It is based on one of Cleo Dawson's novels that was written in 1943. The title of the novel was, She Came to the Valley: A Novel of the Lower Rio Grande Valley, Mission Texas. It is said to be based on her mothers experiences. The film was shot in South Texas's Rio Grande Valley, but a small portion was shot in Oklahoma. In its first run it broke weekend attendance records at Rio Grande theatres.

In January 1979, Maria Luz Corral de Villa came to McAllen, Texas, a south border town to see Kika de la Garza, to present him with a pardon request for her late husband to be exonerated for his actions against the United States. Ms de Villa who at the age of 84 was in frail health arrived by air ambulance. She was assisted by aide Sol Marroquin. Marroquin, the author of Part of the Team (Story of an American Hero) also played the part of Colonel Vaccaro in the film.

About three decades later in July 2008, there was a reunion with some of the cast having a party at the Mission Historical Museum.
