= Shoot the Sun Down =

1978 film

- Directed by: David Leeds
- Written by: David Leeds; Richard Rothstein
- Produced by: David Leeds; Richard Rothstein
- Starring: Christopher Walken; Margot Kidder; Geoffrey Lewis; A Martinez
- Cinematography: Michael Chapman
- Edited by: Allan Holzman
- Music by: Ed Bogas; Judy Munsen
- Production company: David Leeds Productions
- Release date: 1978
- Running time: 100 minutes
- Country: United States
- Language: English

Shoot the Sun Down is a 1978 American neo-Western film made in the style of Sergio Leone. It is directed by David Leeds, written by Leeds and Richard Rothstein, and stars Christopher Walken, Margot Kidder, Geoffrey Lewis, Bo Brundin, and A Martinez.

== Plot ==
In the late 1870s, when much of the Old West was still under Mexican governance, four people are traveling through the deserts, north of Texas and a three-day ride from Santa Fe. Along with the difficulties of Americans and Spanish Troops, much of the unmonitored areas are controlled by competing tribes of Native Americans such as the Navajo, Apache and Hopi.

One is the Scalphunter (Geoffrey Lewis), who says his trade is being a "buffaler" (buffalo hide trader). He is in search of gold. The others are a former ship Captain (Bo Brundin), also in search of the gold; the young woman from England (Margot Kidder), a former chambermaid who, in exchange for ship's passage to America, has signed an agreement to serve the Captain for five years as an indentured servant; and Mr. Rainbow (Christopher Walken), a former Confederate soldier who deserted after being ordered to hunt and kill "Indians."

The Captain sets out to find some of Montezuma's gold, risking danger from both the Native Indians and Mexican soldiers. The "Girl" wants to get out of her contract with the Captain and go to New Orleans and with the help of Mr. Rainbow's and his deal with the Captain. The Scalphunter wants half of the Captain's gold, and tags along with his men and a captured tribe of Native Americans who set out across the desert through the Viaje de la Muerte, the Journey of Death. Sensing competition, the Scalphunter and the Captain align and tie Rainbow to the rocks to die in the heat. They back out on the girl's freedom agreement and leave. An elder of the Tribe frees Rainbow and asks him to save his family and people from the Scalphunter. Rainbow agrees and races across the desert to free the tribe family and the Girl from the control of the Scalphunter and Captain. As they roll a massive golden wheel of Montezuma across the deadly desert, they run into a contingent of Spanish soldiers who threaten to confiscate the wheel of gold and a shoot out ensues with disastrous results for both sides.

== Cast ==
- Margot Kidder as The Woman
- Geoffrey Lewis as Scalphunter
- Christopher Walken as Mr. Rainbow
- Bo Brundin as Captain
- A Martinez as Sunbearer
- Sacheen Littlefeather as Navajo Woman

== Production ==
Filming was completed in New Mexico outside Santa Fe and at the White Sands missile range.
