= Kutuzovo, Krasnoznamensky District, Kaliningrad Oblast =

Kutuzovo Кутузово
- Rural locality
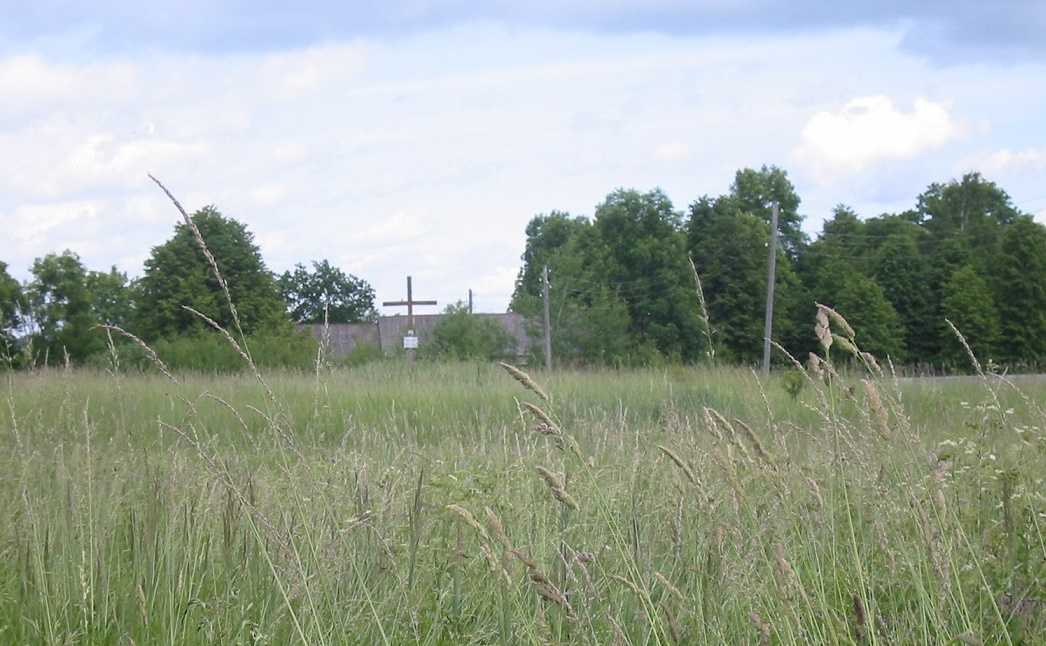
- Cross commemorating the former Saint Immanuel church
- Interactive map of Kutuzovo
- Location of Kutuzovo Kutuzovo (European Russia) Kutuzovo (Russia)
- Coordinates: 54°46′55″N 22°50′41″E
- Country: Russia
- Federal subject: Kaliningrad Oblast
- Administrative district: Krasnoznamensky District

Population (2010 Census)
  - Total: 0
  - Estimate (2010): 0 )
- Time zone: UTC+2 (MSK–1)
- Postal code: 238745
- OKTMO ID: 27713000306

Kutuzovo (Russian: Куту́зово; German: Schirwindt, Polish: Szyrwinta, Lithuanian: Širvinta) is an abandoned rural locality (a settlement) in Krasnoznamensky District of Kaliningrad Oblast, Russia, located at the eastern extreme of the oblast. It is notable for being the easternmost settlement of the old German Reich, before the region was annexed into the Soviet Union after World War II.

== History ==
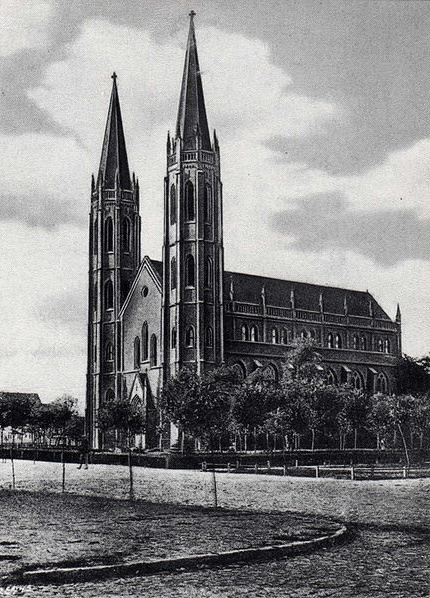
Former Saint Immanuel church, 1925, destroyed 1945

The original name of the settlement is of Baltic origin. In 1454, the region was incorporated by Casimir IV Jagiellon to the Kingdom of Poland upon the request of the anti-Teutonic Prussian Confederation. After the subsequent Thirteen Years' War, since 1466, it formed part of the Kingdom of Poland as a fief held by the Teutonic Order, and after 1525 held by secular Ducal Prussia.

From the 18th century the settlement was part of the Kingdom of Prussia, and was granted town rights in 1725. Since 1773, it was administratively located in the Pillkallen administrative district (Landkreis Pillkallen) within the Gumbinnen government district (Regierungsbezirk Gumbinnen) within the newly formed Province of East Prussia. Being the easternmost settlement of Prussia, it was the country's first town to see sunrise, a fact that was incorporated into its former coat of arms, which featured a Prussian eagle atop a rising sun. The coat of arms was granted by King Frederick William IV on 3 August 1846. From 1871 it was also part of Germany, also being its easternmost settlement. In the late 19th century, the town had a population of 1,376. Four annual fairs and a weekly market were held in the town in the late 19th century. It remained a small border town with a toll booth and checkpoint operated on the border with Russia (namely the Russian Partition of Poland-Lithuania) and then interwar Lithuania, followed briefly by the Soviet Union. The Lithuanian town of Kudirkos Naumiestis (German: Neustadt Schirwindt, lit. "Schirwindt New Town"; Naumiestis also means "new town" in Lithuanian) lay just across the frontier.

Unfortunately, being a border town, Schirwindt also stood directly in the line of fire between the German and Russian armies in both World Wars. It suffered extensive damage during the ultimately unsuccessful Russian invasion of East Prussia in World War I — as did its cross-border sister city Kudirkos Naumiestis – but was quickly rebuilt under the supervision of the Königsberg architect Kurt Frick. Nevertheless, due to its remoteness, the settlement only grew slowly during the interwar years.

During World War II, the Germans operated the Oflag 60 prisoner-of-war camp for Allied POWs and a subcamp of the Stalag I-D POW camp in the town. The town was almost completely destroyed by Soviet Red Army artillery during the East Prussian Offensive in World War II; it was the first town of pre-war Germany that was reached by Russian infantry. In contrast to Pillkallen (Dobrovolsk) and Goldap (Gołdap), Schirwindt was never recaptured by the Wehrmacht. After the war, the northern part of the formed province of East Prussia was transferred to the Russian SFSR of the Soviet Union. The few German inhabitants still remaining in the shelled-out town were expelled in accordance to the Potsdam Agreement, and Schirwindt was renamed Kutuzovo in honour of the Napoleonic era Russian general Mikhail Kutuzov, who crushed the invading forces of Imperial France in 1812.

The town has not been rebuilt since, and the area looks approximately the same as it did immediately after the war. The settlement was deprived of town rights. It was almost completely uninhabited, and was eventually abandoned in the 2000s. Only part of the former school has been preserved, and now functions as a barracks for border patrol guards. The foundations of the old village church (Immanuelkirche), designed by Friedrich August Stüler and blown up by the Soviets in 1947, can still be seen in the town centre.

== Notable people ==
- Arthur Milchhöfer, German archaeologist

== See also ==
- Nemirseta, formerly Nimmersatt, the northernmost settlement of the old German Reich
