= Bo Brundin =

Swedish actor (1937–2022)

- Born: 25 April 1937; Uppsala, Sweden
- Died: 4 September 2022 (aged 85); Uppsala, Sweden
- Occupation: Actor
- Years active: 1970–2002

Bo Brundin (25 April 1937 – 4 September 2022) was a Swedish actor. He appeared in 43 films between 1970 and 2002, and appeared in hit television miniseries such as Rich Man, Poor Man, The Rhinemann Exchange, The Word and Centennial. Most of Brundin's characters in films have been foreign—German, Dutch, Russian—but rarely Swedish. He starred in the 1970 film A Baltic Tragedy, which was entered into the 20th Berlin International Film Festival. Brundin died on 4 September 2022, at the age of 85, in Uppsala, Sweden.

== Selected filmography ==
- A Baltic Tragedy (1970) - Eichfuss
- The Headless Eyes (1971) - Arthur Malcolm
- The Day the Clown Cried (1972, unedited/unreleased) - Ludwig
- Around the World with Fanny Hill (1974) - Peter Wild
- The Great Waldo Pepper (1975) - Ernst Kessler
- Russian Roulette (1975) - Vostik
- The Bionic Woman (1976) "The Ghosthunter" - Emil Laslo
- Wonder Woman (1976) "Fausta, The Nazi Wonder Woman" - Colonel Kesselman and "Going, Going, Gone" (1979) - Vladimir Zukov
- Hawaii Five-O (1977) "East Wind, Ill Wind" - Hoffman/Zadak
- Bomsalva (1978) - Sven Gunnar Alm
- Shoot the Sun Down (1978) - Captain
- Meteor (1979) - Rolf Manheim
- Raise the Titanic (1980) - Captain Prevlov
- The A Team (1986) - Dr. Werner Strasser
- I Saw What You Did (1988) - Larsson
- Late for Dinner (1991) - Dr. Dan Chilblains
- Zorn (1994) - President Taft
- Back to Even (1998) - Bernie
- Jordgubbar med riktig mjölk (2001) - Sigge
