= Hercules and the Princess of Troy =

1965 television film by Albert Band

- Genre: Action; Adventure; Drama; Fantasy
- Written by: Larry Forrester; Ugo Liberatore
- Directed by: Albert Band
- Starring: Gordon Scott; Diana Hyland; Gordon Mitchell; Roger Browne
- Narrated by: Everett Sloane
- Music by: Fred Steiner
- Countries of origin: Italy; United States
- Original language: English

Production
- Executive producer: Joseph E. Levine
- Producer: Albert Band
- Cinematography: Enzo Barboni
- Editors: Russell Wiles; John Woodcock
- Running time: 47 minutes
- Production company: Embassy Pictures

Original release
- Network: ABC
- Release: September 12, 1965

Hercules and the Princess of Troy is a 1965 Italian-American made-for-television adventure fantasy film directed by Albert Band. It was originally made as a pilot for a television series which never materialized. Albeit very short, the film was released to US television as a feature film in spite of its short running time. It is also referred to as Hercules vs the Sea Monster in reference books.

== Plot ==
The film opens with the statement that the people of Troy must once a month sacrifice a maiden lest a sea monster from destroying their city. Because of this, some families flee from Troy, only to be captured by pirates. Hercules (Gordon Scott), aboard the Olympia, comes across one of these ships and frees the Trojans aboard. Going to Troy, Hercules is given use of two horses that cannot be wounded by arrows. He then learns from Ortag (Roger Browne) the monster's weakness: its armor doesn't cover its belly.

Shortly afterwards, a boxer named Botus tries to poison Hercules but is impaled on his own spiked gloves and dies. Then Hercules and Ulysses (Mart Hulswit) are attacked by what appear to be thieves, and Diogenes (Paul Stevens) presents the theory that Petra (Steve Garrett) killed his brother, Linus, and is planning to have Princess Diana (Diana Hyland) killed. After this theory is revealed to Princess Diana, she is chosen for the ceremony, and the high priest is killed. After challenging Petra, Hercules is captured and held in a metal hole, down which soldiers pour oil to keep Hercules from climbing out. Ortag rescues Hercules and dies fighting the monster which Hercules finally slays. Princess Diana becomes ruler of Troy, and Hercules continues on his way.

== Cast ==
- Gordon Scott as Hercules
- Paul Stevens as Diogenes
- Mart Hulswit as Ulysses
- Diana Hyland as Princess Diana
- Steve Garrett as Petra
- Gordon Mitchell as pirate captain
- George Ardisson as Leander (as Giorgio Ardisson)
- Roger Browne as Ortag
- Jacques Stany as Argus (as Jacques Stanislawski)
- Mario Novelli as Botus
- Dan Christian as boatswain
- Everett Sloane as narrator

== See also ==
- List of American films of 1965
- List of films featuring Hercules
