= Catherine Mary Dealy =

American costume designer and actress

- Born: February 9, 1894
- Died: December 23, 1981 (aged 87); Los Angeles, California
- Occupations: Costume designer; stage actress
- Spouse: Jacob J. Shubert (m. 1907; div. 1917)
- Children: John Jason Shubert (1908–1962)

Catherine Mary Dealy (February 9, 1894 – December 23, 1981), also known as Catherine Mary Shubert and Mrs. J. J. Shubert, was an American costume designer and actress. She is known for Broadway shows such as The Passing Show of 1915, and A World of Pleasure.

== Career ==
She began her career as chorus girl and performer, such as in My Lady's Maid in 1906, before moving into work as a costume designer.

She took over as the costume designer for the Winter Garden Theatre in 1915. She was noted for her use of backless dresses, shorter skirts, and ostrich feathers. She designed costumes for the Broadway shows The Passing Show of 1915 and A World of Pleasure. A World of Pleasure was even put on a road tour after its Broadway debt.

== Personal life ==
She married Jacob J. Shubert in 1907 and thus joined the prominent Broadway theater family, the Shuberts, who owned the Winter Garden theatre. She divorced Jacob J. Shubert in 1917. They had one son together, John Jason Shubert, a producer and theater owner in his own right.
