= The Last Movie =

1971 film by Dennis Hopper

- US film poster
- Directed by: Dennis Hopper
- Screenplay by: Stewart Stern
- Story by: Dennis Hopper; Stewart Stern
- Produced by: Paul Lewis
- Starring: Dennis Hopper; Stella Garcia; Don Gordon; Peter Fonda; Sam Fuller; Kris Kristofferson; Michelle Phillips; Dean Stockwell; Russ Tamblyn
- Cinematography: László Kovács
- Edited by: David Berlatsky; Antranig Mahakian
- Music by: Kris Kristofferson; John Buck Wilkin; Chabuca Granda; Severn Darden
- Production company: Alta-Light
- Distributed by: Universal Pictures
- Release date: September 29, 1971 (New York City)
- Running time: 108 minutes
- Country: United States
- Languages: English; Spanish; Quechua
- Budget: $1 million

The Last Movie is a 1971 American metafictional drama film directed by and starring Dennis Hopper. It was written by Stewart Stern, based on a story by Hopper and Stern, and features an extensive supporting cast including Stella Garcia, Don Gordon, Peter Fonda, Sam Fuller, Kris Kristofferson (in his film debut), Michelle Phillips, Dean Stockwell, Russ Tamblyn and Tomas Milian. The plot follows a disenfranchised stuntman (Hopper), who begins a filmmaking-centric cargo cult among Peruvian natives after going into self-imposed exile.

Greenlit after the success of Hopper's previous film Easy Rider, Universal Pictures gave the director/star complete creative control over the project, which was budgeted at $1 million and was shot in Peru. Hopper only loosely followed the script by Stern, filming hours upon hours of footage built around friends whom he invited to the set, including his frequent collaborators Fonda and Basil. The film's elongated post-production came from Hopper's constant editing and re-editing of the film while suffering from the effects of his drug habit, leading to allegations of self-sabotage and missing the film's initial deadline to deliver a final cut by nearly six months.

Despite high expectations, including a well-received screening at the 1971 Venice International Film Festival, the film was a critical and financial disaster. Dissatisfied with the finished product, Universal Pictures gave the film a staggered, limited release under multiple alternative titles. Its poor reception led to Hopper's self-imposed exile from Hollywood for several years, barely starring in any American film until Francis Ford Coppola hired him for Apocalypse Now (1979), not directing another film until Out of the Blue (1980), and never writing another film again. In the decades since its release, it has undergone a critical reappraisal and has become a cult classic.

== Plot ==
Kansas is a stunt coordinator in charge of horses on a western being shot in a small Peruvian village. Following a tragic incident on the set where an actor is killed while doing a stunt, he decides to quit the movie business and stay in Peru with a local woman. He thinks he has found paradise, but is soon called in to help in a bizarre incident: the Peruvian natives are "filming" their own movie with "cameras" made of sticks, and acting out real western movie violence, as they do not understand movie fakery.

== Cast ==
- Dennis Hopper as Kansas
- Stella Garcia as Maria
- Don Gordon as Neville Robey
- Julie Adams as Mrs. Anderson
- Peter Fonda as The Young Sheriff
- Sylvia Miles as The Script Clerk
- Samuel Fuller as Sam
- Dean Stockwell as Billy the Kid
- Russ Tamblyn as Charlie Bowdre
- Tomas Milian as The Priest
- Toni Basil as Rose
- Severn Darden as The Mayor
- Roy Engel as Harry Anderson
- Henry Jaglom as The Minister's Son
- Warren Finnerty as The Banker
- Michelle Phillips as The Banker's Daughter
- Kris Kristofferson as The Minstrel Wrangler
- Michael Anderson Jr. as The Mayor's Son
- Rod Cameron as Pat Garrett
- Donna Baccala as Miss Anderson
- John Phillip Law as "Little Brother"
- Ted Markland as "Big Brother"
- James Mitchum as Art
- Richard Rust as Pisco
- John Alderman as Jonathan
- Edward Donno as Hal The Stuntman
- Daniel Ades as Thomas Mercado
- Allen Warnick as Assistant Director

== Analysis ==
The film touches on the ideas of fiction versus reality, especially in regards to cinema. The movie is presented in a way that challenges the viewer's traditional cinematic understanding of storytelling, by presenting the story in a non-chronological fashion, and by including several devices typically only seen behind the scenes of film-making (rough edits and "scene missing" cards), and the use of jarring jump cuts.

== Production ==
=== Conception ===
Hopper later said he got the idea for the film when making The Sons of Katie Elder in Mexico. He says he came up with the story and got Stewart Stern to write the script; Stern had written Rebel Without a Cause, in which Hopper played a small role. Hopper said, "I had time to fantasize as to what would happen when we left this village, leaving behind all the movie set fronts built on their existing adobe houses and church. ... I wanted to use film as film; I wanted to keep saying, you're really just watching a movie."

Hopper tried for several years to secure financing for the film, intending it to be his directorial debut.

In July 1966, The New York Times reported that record producer Phil Spector would help make the movie with Hopper. "It will be an art movie," said Spector. "I am an admirer of Truffaut, Stanley Kubrick, Fellini. It'll be in that tradition. Hollywood needs that kind of movie." Filming was to start in Mexico on 15 September with Haskell Wexler doing cinematography.

However, due to the artistically challenging nature of the film, no studios were interested until Hopper's actual first film as a director, Easy Rider, became a massive hit in 1969.

Based on the success of Easy Rider, Universal launched a project to give five young film makers $1 million each, and give them free rein to create a movie, with little to no intervention from the studio, as had been done on Easy Rider. The other four were The Hired Hand, Taking Off, Silent Running, and American Graffiti, directed by Peter Fonda, Miloš Forman, Douglas Trumbull, and George Lucas, respectively.

In October 1969, Universal announced Hopper would make the film for his Alta Light Production Company. (Hopper wanted to follow The Last Movie with another film called Second Chance about him and Fonda trying to raise money to make Easy Rider. This was never made.) The initial budget for the film was $800,000.

Hopper wanted John Wayne and Henry Hathaway to appear in the movie, as a homage to Sons of Katie Elder.

=== Filming ===
Hopper spent much of 1970 in Peru, bringing many of his actor and musician friends to that country, including singer Kris Kristofferson and director Samuel Fuller, and shooting the film under the working title Chinchero.

Stern later said the film was ruined by improvisation, saying "That script wasn't taken out of my hands so much as put aside. It's still perfectly serviceable." Stern did not go on location, but at Hopper's request, he went to look at a rough cut in Taos: "Mainly, what I felt was very disappointed, not only that he didn't use the scenes as they were written in the screenplay and that he chose to improvise with people who were not up to that kind of improvisation, but also that he hadn't shot scenes that were essential. Including the ending of the picture." He then asked Hopper to shoot the scenes as written but that Hopper would not do it. "He acknowledges the value of the screenplay, but feels that that wasn't the picture that he had in mind then, and that he certainly isn't ashamed of having done what he did. I absolutely respect him for that." Despite these disagreements, Stern said he would be willing to collaborate with Hopper again.

=== Post-production ===
With hours and hours of footage, Hopper holed up in his home editing studio in Taos, New Mexico, but failed to deliver a cut by the end of 1970. He was in a period of severe alcohol and drug abuse, as shown in an extremely rare and barely released documentary titled The American Dreamer, directed by Lawrence Schiller and L. M. Kit Carson, but managed to put together a fairly straightforward cut in terms of conventional storytelling. He was mocked over it by his friend, cult director Alejandro Jodorowsky, who urged him to edit the film unconventionally and attempt to break new cinematic ground. Hopper destroyed his first cut and crafted the more disjointed narrative that is known today; he finally completed that final edit in the spring of 1971.

== Reception ==
The movie won the Critics Prize (CIDALC Award) at the Venice Film Festival. Despite that, it failed financially and critically after a four-week run at New York City's East 59th Street Twins. Contrary to some sources, including statements by Hopper himself, the film did play in other theaters across the country after its New York premiere, even playing at drive-ins under the name Chinchero.

Hopper later said of the Universal films "None of these movies were distributed properly, none of them given a chance. I still believe that we were undermined because we didn't fit into the tax structure of Universal Pictures. Lew Wasserman (Universal's CEO) just killed them."

Because of the film's failure, Hopper did not direct again until 1980's Out of the Blue.

The book The Fifty Worst Films of All Time recounts the film's production in some detail, saying that the studio was so eager to cash in on the youth market following the success of Easy Rider that they gave Hopper carte blanche, and they were horrified with the results.

== Legacy ==
The film's initial failure led to Hopper's virtual exile from Hollywood, one that lasted well over a decade. Nonetheless, by 1978, Hopper announced he was very proud of the film, and hosted many screenings. While he had disparaged the film in the past, Hopper said it was ahead of its time, and only now had audiences and critics started to understand his artistic vision.

In 2006, Hopper told Playboy that he had re-acquired the rights to the film and was planning a DVD release. The magazine said that Hopper had held a screening of the film at the Playboy Mansion for Hugh Hefner and several Playmates. The film was not released on DVD before Hopper's death in May 2010.

On August 16, 2018, Arbelos Films, Vidiots & American Cinematheque hosted the Los Angeles 4K restoration premiere at Sid Grauman's Egyptian Theater in Hollywood, California. A Blu-ray of the film was announced for release on November 13, 2018.

== See also ==
- Cargo cult
- List of American films of 1971
- Theatre of Cruelty
