= Arthur Milchhöfer =

German archaeologist (1852–1903)

Arthur Milchhöfer

Arthur Alexander Johann Milchhöfer (21 March 1852 – 7 December 1903) was a German archaeologist born in Schirwindt, East Prussia, Kingdom of Prussia. He specialized in studies of Greek Antiquity, and is remembered for his topographical research of ancient Attica.

He studied at the Friedrich Wilhelm University of Berlin and at the Ludwig-Maximilians-Universität München, where he was a student of Heinrich Brunn (1822–1894). Subsequently, he became an assistant to Ernst Curtius (1814–1896) in Berlin, and in 1883 was habilitated for archaeology at the University of Göttingen. Later on, he was an associate professor at the University of Münster, where he was also in charge of the library of classical archaeology. In 1895, he became a professor of archaeology at Kiel University.

Milchoefer was the first to suspect a Bronze Age advanced culture on the island of Crete, which had also subjugated the Greek mainland before Troy. After the mythical King Minos from the Theseus saga, he called it the "Minoan culture", a term later adopted and coined by British archaeologist Sir Arthur Evans after he began excavating at Knossos in 1900.

== Published works ==
In his 1883 book "Die Anfänge der Kunst in Griechenland" (The Origins of Art in Greece), he was the first to suggest that Crete was the center of Mycenaean culture. Other noted works on ancient Greece by Milchhöfer include:

- Die Stadtgeschichte von Athen (The history of the city of Athens), (1891); with Ernst Curtius (1814–1896).
- Karten von Attika (Charts of Attica), (1881–1903); with Curtius and Johann August Kaupert (1822–1899).

== Works cited ==
- Karadimas, Nektarios; Momigliano, Nicoletta (2004). "On the term 'Minoan' before Evans' work in Crete (1894)". Studi Micenei ed Egeo Anatolici. 44 (2): 79–94.
