= Albert Band =

American film director (1924–2002)

- Born: May 7, 1924; Paris, France
- Died: June 14, 2002 (aged 78); Los Angeles, California, U.S.
- Other names: Alfredo Antonini; Artemio Antonini
- Occupations: Film producer, film director, screenwriter
- Years active: 1951–1996
- Spouse: Jacquelyn Richardson
- Children: Charles Band; Richard Band
- Father: Max Band
- Relatives: Alex Band (grandson)

Albert Band (May 7, 1924 – June 14, 2002) was an American film director and film producer.

He was the son of artist Max Band, father of filmmaker Charles Band and of film composer Richard Band and the grandfather of singer and songwriter Alex Band.

== Life and career ==
Band was born in Paris, France, the son of Lithuanian Jewish parents Bertha (née Finkelstein) and Max Band, an artist. His mother was born in Marijampolė, and his father was from Kudirkos Naumiestis. His family is Jewish. He escaped from Paris to the United States with his family prior to the occupation of France during World War II. He graduated from Hollywood High School.

Interested in film, he became an apprentice at Warner Bros. where he developed contacts eventually becoming an assistant director on John Huston's The Asphalt Jungle, then adapting the story The Red Badge of Courage for Huston's film of the same name.

He made his debut as a producer and director in The Young Guns (1956), combining the two then-popular genres of Westerns and juvenile delinquent films. In the late 1950s, he moved to Europe, producing a variety of films, beginning in Sweden with Face of Fire (1959), based on another of Stephen Crane's stories, The Monster.

== Filmography ==
=== Producer ===
- The Young Guns (1956) (producer) (uncredited)
- I Bury the Living (1958) (producer)
- Face of Fire (1959) (producer)
- The Avenger (dir. Giorgio Venturini, 1962) (producer)
- Gunfight at Red Sands (dir. Ricardo Blasco, 1963) (producer)
- Grand Canyon Massacre (dir. Sergio Corbucci, 1964) (producer)
- Hercules and the Princess of Troy (1965) (TV) (producer)
- The Tramplers (1965) (producer)
- The Hellbenders (dir. Sergio Corbucci, 1967) (producer)
- A Minute to Pray, a Second to Die (dir. Franco Giraldi, 1968) (producer)
- Little Cigars (dir. Chris Christenberry, 1973) (producer)
- Mansion of the Doomed (dir. Michael Pataki, 1976) (supervising executive producer)
- Cinderella (dir. Michael Pataki, 1977) (producer)
- Dracula's Dog (1978) (producer)
- She Came to the Valley (1979) (producer)
- Metalstorm: The Destruction of Jared-Syn (dir. Charles Band, 1983) (executive producer)
- Ghost Warrior (aka Swordkill) (dir. J. Larry Carroll, 1984) (executive producer)
- Troll (dir. John Carl Buechler, 1986) (producer)
- TerrorVision (dir. Ted Nicolaou, 1986) (producer)
- Ghoulies II (1987) (producer)
- Robot Jox (dir. Stuart Gordon, 1990) (producer)
- The Pit and the Pendulum (dir. Stuart Gordon, 1991) (V) (producer)
- Joey Takes a Cab (1991) (producer)
- Honey, I Blew Up the Kid (dir. Randal Kleiser, 1992) (executive producer)
- Doctor Mordrid (1992) (producer)
- Trancers III (dir. C. Courtney Joyner, 1992) (V) (producer)
- Remote (dir. Ted Nicolaou, 1993) (V) (producer)
- Oblivion (dir. Sam Irvin, 1994) (co-producer)
- Dragonworld (dir. Ted Nicolaou, 1994) (producer)
- Pet Shop (dir. Hope Perello, 1994) (producer)
- Castle Freak (dir. Stuart Gordon, 1995) (executive producer)
- Magic Island (dir. Sam Irvin, 1995) (V) (producer)
- Oblivion 2: Backlash (dir. Sam Irvin, 1996) (co-producer)
- Zarkorr! The Invader (dir. Aaron Osborne, Michael Deak, 1996) (executive producer)

=== Director ===
- The Young Guns (1956)
- I Bury the Living (1958)
- Face of Fire (1959)
- Hercules and the Princess of Troy (1965) (TV)
- The Tramplers (1965)
- Dracula's Dog (1978)
- She Came to the Valley (1979)
- Ghoulies II (1987)
- Joey Takes a Cab (1991)
- Doctor Mordrid (1992)
- Robot Wars (1993)
- Prehysteria! (1993)
- Prehysteria! 2 (1994)
- Prehysteria! 3 (1995)

=== Actor ===
- Specter of the Rose (1946) (uncredited) .... Man
- The Red Badge of Courage (1951) (uncredited) .... Union Soldier Fording River
- End of the World (1977) .... Awards Party Guest
- Tourist Trap (1979) (uncredited) .... Waxwork Grandfather
- Troll (1986) .... Older Couple on TV
- Trancers II (1991) .... Chili Man

=== Writer ===
- The Red Badge of Courage (1951) (adaptation)
- Footsteps in the Night (1957) (screenplay) (story)
- Face of Fire (1959)
- The Avenger (1962) (adaptation)
- Gunfight at Red Sands (1963) (screenplay)
- Grand Canyon Massacre (1964)
- The Tramplers (1965) (as Alfredo Antonini)
- The Hellbenders (1967) (story)
- A Minute to Pray, a Second to Die (1968)
- Auditions (1978)
- She Came to the Valley (1979)

=== Other ===
- From Beyond (1986) (production manager)
