= Jacob J. Shubert =

American theatre owner/operator and producer (1879–1963)

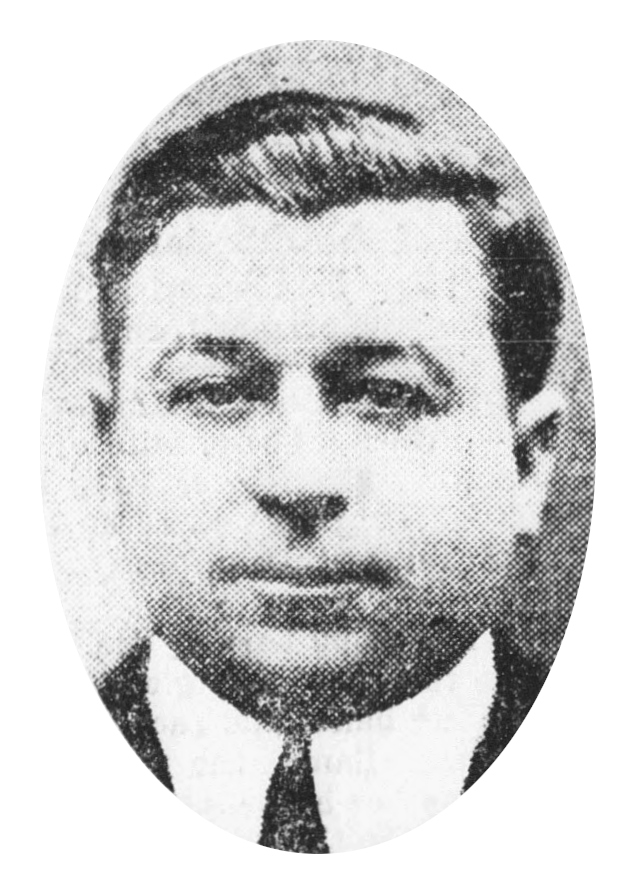
- Shubert in 1925
- Born: August 29, 1879; Vladislavov, Suwałki Governorate, Congress Poland
- Died: December 26, 1963 (aged 84); Manhattan, New York City, U.S.
- Other names: J. J. Shubert, Jake Shubert
- Occupations: Theatre owner/operator, producer
- Spouse: Catherine Mary Dealy (m. 1907; div. 1917)
- Relatives: Lee Shubert, brother Sam S. Shubert, brother

Jacob J. Shubert (August 29, 1879 – December 26, 1963) was an American theatre owner/operator and producer, the youngest brother of the notable Shubert family.

== Biography ==
Born in 1879 in Vladislavov, in the Suwałki Governorate of Congress Poland, a part of the Russian Empire (present-day Kudirkos Naumiestis, Lithuania), (Note: His obituary said he was born in Syracuse, New York.) he was the sixth child and third son of Duvvid Schubart and Katrina Helwitz, a Jewish couple. Jacob was still a small child when the family emigrated in 1881 to the United States, settling in Syracuse, New York, where a number of Jewish families from their hometown were already living.

His father's alcoholism kept the family in difficult financial circumstances and both he and his older brothers received little in the way of education and had no choice but to go to work at a young age. With borrowed money, he and brothers Sam and Lee Shubert eventually embarked on a business venture that led to them becoming the successful operators of several theatre houses in upstate New York.

The Shubert brothers decided to expand their theatrical operations and in 1900 Sam and Lee Shubert moved to New York City leaving Jacob at home to manage their existing theatres. In New York, the elder Shuberts laid the foundations for what was to become the largest theatre empire in the 20th century including Broadway's Winter Garden and Shubert Theatres. In 1905, Sam Shubert was traveling to Pittsburgh, Pennsylvania, on business when the passenger train he was on collided with several freight cars. Shubert died as a result of the injuries he sustained. His death changed the brothers' business dynamics and Jacob assumed a much larger role.

Together, although often feuding, Jacob and Lee Shubert overcame the stranglehold on the industry by the Theatrical Syndicate's monopoly under Abe Erlanger and Mark Klaw to build the largest theatre empire in the 20th century.

Jacob's son, John, took over as head of the operations in the 1950s but died unexpectedly in Florida in November 1962; a year later, Jacob died at his Manhattan apartment. He apparently was not made aware of his son's death. Jacob was divorced from his first wife, Catherine, in 1917, and was married to his second wife, Muriel, at the time of his death. He was interred in the family plot in the Salem Fields Cemetery in Brooklyn.

Jacob Shubert left a substantial portion of his assets to the Shubert Foundation, and by 1972, the assets of his estate totalled $60 million ($462 million in 2025).
