= The Tramplers =

1965 Italian Spaghetti Western film

- Directed by: Albert Band and Mario Sequi
- Written by: Albert Band (writer), Will Cook (novel)
- Produced by: Albert Band, Alvaro Mancori, Anna Maria Chretien
- Starring: Joseph Cotten, Gordon Scott
- Cinematography: Alvaro Mancori Eastmancolor, Pathe
- Edited by: Maurizio Lucidi
- Music by: Angelo Francesco Lavagnino
- Distributed by: Embassy Pictures M.C.M
- Release date: 31 December 1965
- Running time: 105 minutes
- Country: Italy
- Languages: Italian; English

The Tramplers (Italian: Gli uomini dal passo pesante, lit. 'The heavy-footed men') is a 1965 Italian Spaghetti Western film directed by Albert Band and Mario Sequi based on the novel Guns of North Texas by Will Cook.

== Plot ==
When Lon Cordeen, an ex-Civil War soldier, returns home to his father Temple he finds his father can't accept the loss of the Confederacy. When Temple tries to help the South rise again serious conflicts develop which split the family.

== Cast ==
- Gordon Scott as Lon Cordeen
- Joseph Cotten as Temple Cordeen
- Muriel Franklin as Alice Cordeen
- James Mitchum as Hoby Cordeen
- Ilaria Occhini as Edith Wickett
- Franco Nero as Charley Garvey
- Emil Jordan as Fred Wickett
- Franco Balducci as Pete Wiley
- Silla Bettini as Hogan
- Caroll Brown as Mrs. Temple Cordeen
- Aldo Cecconi as Jim Hennessy
- Georges Lycan as Longfellow Wiley
- Dario Michaelis as Bert Cordeen
- Edith Peters as Emma
- Romano Puppo as Payne Cordeen
- Ivan Scratuglia as Adrian Cordeen
- Emma Valloni as Bess Cordeen
- Ken Wlaschin as Saloon Owner
- Lino Desmond as Sheriff
- Giovanni Cianfriglia

== Releases ==
This was released on a limited edition R0 NTSC DVD by Wild East Productions in 2013.
