= End of the World (1977 film) =

1977 film by John Hayes

- Theatrical release poster
- Directed by: John Hayes
- Written by: Frank Ray Perilli
- Produced by: Charles Band; Richard Band
- Starring: Christopher Lee; Sue Lyon; Kirk Scott; Lew Ayres; Macdonald Carey; Dean Jagger
- Cinematography: John Huneck
- Edited by: John Hayes
- Music by: Andrew Belling
- Distributed by: Charles Band Productions
- Release date: October 12, 1977 (United States)
- Running time: 88 minutes
- Country: United States
- Language: English

End of the World is a 1977 American science fiction film directed by John Hayes.

== Plot ==
NASA Professor Andrew Boran is a research scientist who discovers strange radio signals in outer space that appear to originate from Earth. The signals seem to predict natural disasters that are occurring around the globe.

When he and his wife Sylvia decide to investigate the source of the signals, they end up being held captive in a convent that has been infiltrated by aliens. These invaders, from the planet Utopia, plan to destroy the world with the natural disasters. They have replicated the original inhabitants of the convent and now pose as the Father and the nuns.

While posing as the human Father Pergado, the alien leader Zindar explains Earth is a hotbed of disease that cannot be permitted to continue polluting the galaxy.

Boran and Sylvia decide in the end not to stop the destruction of Earth and instead return to Utopia with Zindar. To make the return safely, Zindar holds Sylvia hostage and demands that Boran steal a Variance Crystal from the lab so that they can escape the destruction of Earth. Earth then explodes.

== Cast ==
- Christopher Lee as Father Pergado / Zindar
- Sue Lyon as Sylvia Boran
- Kirk Scott as Professor Andrew Boran
- Dean Jagger as Ray Collins
- Lew Ayres as Commander Joseph Beckerman
- Macdonald Carey as John Davis
- Liz Ross as Sister Patrizia
- Jon van Ness as Mr. Sanchez

== Reception ==
Creature Feature found it to be cheap and plodding, giving it 1.5 out of 5 stars. TV Guide gave the movie 1 of 5 stars. Moria found the movie dull and legendarily bad, only worth viewing to see the early work of Charles Band, and gave the movie 1/2 of a star. It further said Lee gave a very good performance, much better than the movie deserved.

== Production ==
The movie was produced by Z movie impresario Charles Band. Lee claimed subsequently that the producers misled him about the cast in order to secure his participation:

I was told quite categorically by the producer that they had Arthur Kennedy, Richard Basehart, José Ferrer, John Carradine--I was told categorically that these people were signed to do this film. All fine actors. That was totally untrue.

— Christopher Lee, The films of Christopher Lee,

== Release ==
Released on DVD in 2005.
