= Cinderella (1977 film) =

1977 American erotic musical comedy by Michael Pataki

- Theatrical release poster
- Directed by: Michael Pataki
- Written by: Frank Ray Perilli
- Based on: Cinderella by Charles Perrault
- Produced by: Charles Band
- Starring: Cheryl Smith; Brett Smiley; Sy Richardson
- Cinematography: Joseph Mangine
- Edited by: Laurence Jacobs
- Music by: Andrew Belling
- Distributed by: Group 1
- Release date: May 1977
- Running time: 94 minutes; Edited version: 91 minutes; UK edited version: 86 minutes
- Country: United States
- Language: English
- Box office: $2.6 million

Cinderella (a.k.a. The Other Cinderella) is a 1977 American erotic musical comedy film directed by Michael Pataki and starring Cheryl "Rainbeaux" Smith, Brett Smiley, and Sy Richardson.

== Plot ==
An adaptation of the fairy tale, Cinderella traces the misadventures of Cinderella (Smith), who suffers abuse from her two incestuous stepsisters and her man-crazy stepmother. Cinderella longs for the day when she will escape her drudgery and struggles to keep her spirits up until then ("Cinderella").

The Prince (Smiley), a jaded young man who no longer feels pleasure from ordinary sex ("My Kingdom Won't Come"), has been reluctant to marry, to the concern of his bickering parents the King and Queen. The King decides to host a ball in the hopes that the Prince will find at least one woman who satisfies his sexual urges ("The Royal Ball") and sends forth the Royal Chamberlain to invite all the willing women in the land. The Chamberlain, however, is more interested in his own sexual conquests and is delayed by his constant attempts to seduce the women he is meant to be inviting.

Word of the ball reaches Cinderella and her stepsisters. The stepsisters gloat about how they will seduce the Prince ("Do It To Me"). They humiliate Cinderella by dumping ashes and garbage over her, then set out for the ball without her. Cinderella, heartbroken, cries herself to sleep and has a nightmare about being sexually assaulted.

With Cinderella asleep and the family gone, a wanted cat burglar and self-proclaimed transvestite and kleptomaniac (Richardson) ducks into the empty house to hide from an angry mob. Upon being discovered by Cinderella, he convinces her that he is her "fairy" godmother and sends her upstairs to bathe while he burgles the house ("Grab It"). When Cinderella emerges fully cleaned, he is amazed at her beauty and decides to help her after all. Producing a "magic wand" he has stolen previously, he is astonished to discover that the device really works and uses it to give Cinderella a beautiful gown. As a finishing touch, the Fairy Godmother enchants Cinderella's vagina into "a snapper" to make her irresistible to the Prince. The wand bears a warning that the magic will only last until midnight. The Fairy Godmother accompanies Cinderella to make sure she leaves on time, but secretly uses the opportunity to steal the crown jewels. Meanwhile, Cinderella's desperate stepmother throws herself at the reluctant Lord Chamberlain ("It's So Hard To Find A Man").

At the ball, the Prince indulges in a blindfolded orgy with every willing woman in his kingdom, but finds himself bored by them all until he encounters Cinderella's magical vagina. He falls instantly in love with her, but before he can learn her true identity, the clock strikes midnight, and the Fairy Godmother rushes Cinderella away with the full court in pursuit ("Oh, A Snapper!").

The following day, the Prince must have sex with every woman in the land in order to identify his beloved. By the time he reaches Cinderella's house, he is so exhausted that he must be brought in on a stretcher, and Cinderella must approach him cowgirl style. Recognizing "the snapper," the Prince declares Cinderella to be the girl he loves, and the two depart for the palace. On their way, they see that another angry mob has captured the Fairy Godmother and intend to execute him for burgling the royal palace. Cinderella quickly tells the Prince that the Fairy Godmother was the one who gave her her magical vagina, and the Prince halts the execution and offers the Fairy Godmother a royal pardon and a position in court. The Fairy Godmother jumps aboard their carriage and declares that the story has ended happily for all before settling back to watch Cinderella and her Prince have sex.

== Cast ==
- Cheryl Smith as Cinderella
- Yana Nirvana as Drucella
- Marilyn Corwin as Marbella
- Jennifer Stace as Cinderella's Stepmother
- Sy Richardson as Fairy Godmother
- Brett Smiley as Prince
- Kirk Scott as Lord Chamberlain
- Boris Moris as King
- Pamela Stonebrook as Queen
- Frank Ray Perilli as Italian Ambassador

== Musical numbers ==
This list is for the full uncut version.

1. "Cinderella" - Cinderella
2. "My Kingdom Won't Come" - The Prince
3. "Do It to Me" - Drucella, Marbella
4. "The Royal Ball" - Lord Chamberlain
5. "You Gotta Grab It" - Fairy Godmother, Cinderella
6. "It's so Hard to Find a Man" - Evil Stepmother (Deleted from some releases)
7. "Snapper" - The King, The Queen, Lord Chamberlain, Chorus
8. "Finale" - Chorus

== Edits ==
- In the UK, in 1977, with the title, The Other Cinderella, the film was released by Alpha Films Ltd. after unspecified cuts had been made by the BBFC giving a run time of 86 minutes 37 seconds.
- In the UK, in 1990, a video version was released by Hustler Video Ltd.
- In Germany, in 2013, with the title, Cinderellas Unmoralische Abenteuer, Donau Film released a DVD with a quoted run time of 90 minutes.
- In the UK, the film's cinema poster was required to contain the warning "Positively not to be confused with any other film with a similar title".
