= Brett Smiley (singer) =

American singer

- Born: Brett Anthony Smiley; September 25, 1955; Washington, Indiana, U.S.
- Died: January 8, 2016 (aged 60) Brooklyn, New York City, U.S.
- Genres: Glam rock; Pop; Rock
- Occupations: Musician; singer-songwriter; actor
- Years active: 1969–2015
- Labels: RPM Records; What's Your Rupture?

Brett Anthony Smiley (September 25, 1955 – January 8, 2016) was an American actor and singer-songwriter who was active in the UK during the glam rock era of the early 1970s. Smiley released one single, "Va Va Va Voom", and made an appearance on the Russell Harty television show, where he performed the song "Space Ace". In 2003, a previously unheard album called Breathlessly Brett was released. One posthumous vinyl album entitled Sunset Tower was released in 2019.

== Career ==
Smiley was born in Indiana and began his career as a child actor, playing Oliver Twist on Broadway for four years. He also appeared in many television commercials.

In 1974, Smiley—who, at the time, was managed and produced by Rolling Stones manager Andrew Loog Oldham—recorded an album, Breathlessly Brett. However, Oldham feared that the album, which included the songs "Va Va Va Voom" and "Space Ace", would sell poorly, and refused to release it. However, it was eventually released in 2003, when RPM Records included it as part of its Lipsmackin' 70s collection.

Smiley also starred as the Prince in the 1977 American erotic musical comedy film Cinderella.

In 2004, rock biographer Nina Antonia published a book about Smiley, The Prettiest Star: Whatever Happened to Brett Smiley.

In 2006, Smiley contributed to the charity album Not Alone.

Smiley still performed occasionally until 2015 in New York City, and was recording songs for a new CD. He died on January 8, 2016, after a lengthy battle with HIV and hepatitis. His cause of death, though, was a head injury from falling down.

In 2019, a posthumous album, Sunset Tower, was released for Record Store Day, with a total of 1000 vinyl records being pressed, as well as it being available online on the website Bandcamp. The album consists entirely of demos recorded between 1969 and 1973 that were later reworked for Breathlessly Brett, or scrapped entirely.

== Discography ==
=== Singles ===
- "Va Va Va Voom"/"Space Ace" (1974)

=== Albums ===
- Breathlessly Brett (2003) track listing:
1. "Brett's Lullaby"
2. "Highty Tighty"
3. "Space Ace"
4. "April in Paris"
5. "Solitaire"
6. "Va Va Va Voom"
7. "Run for the Sun"
8. "I Want to Hold Your Hand" (Lennon–McCartney)
9. "Pre-Columbian Love"
10. "Queen of Hearts"
11. "I Can't Help Myself"/"Over the Rainbow"
12. "Young at Heart"
- Sunset Tower (2019) track listing:
1. "Highty Tighty"
2. "Cherry Hookers"
3. "Abstracted Billy"
4. "Mood in Deco"
5. "Space Ace"
6. "Queen of Hearts"
7. "Lying in the Sun"
8. "Diamonds Couldn't Bring You Back"

=== Other ===
- "Our Lady of the Barren Tree" (Not Alone, 2006)
