= Kudirkos Naumiestis =

Town in Suvalkija Region, Lithuania

- Town
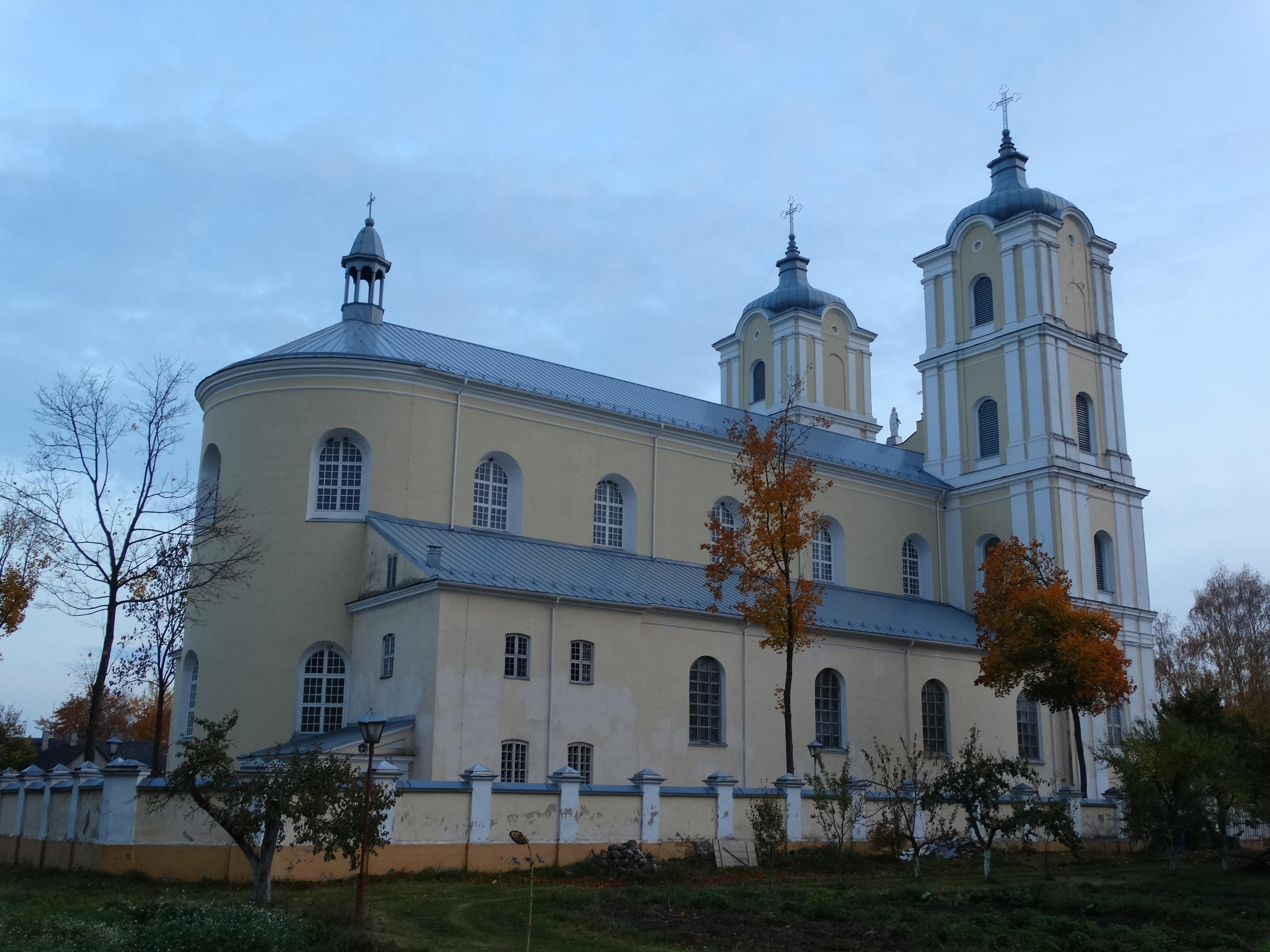

- Coat of arms

- Location of Kudirkos Naumiestis
- Coordinates: 54°46′25″N 22°51′47″E
- Country: Lithuania
- Ethnographic region: Suvalkija
- County: Marijampolė County
- Municipality: Šakiai district municipality
- Eldership: Kudirkos Naumiestis eldership
- Capital of: Kudirkos Naumiestis eldership
- First mentioned: 1561
- Granted city rights: 1643

Population (2020)
  - Total: 1,480
- Time zone: UTC+2 (EET)
  - Summer (DST): UTC+3 (EEST)

Kudirkos Naumiestis is a town in southern Lithuania. It is located 25 km (16 mi) south-west of Šakiai.

== History ==
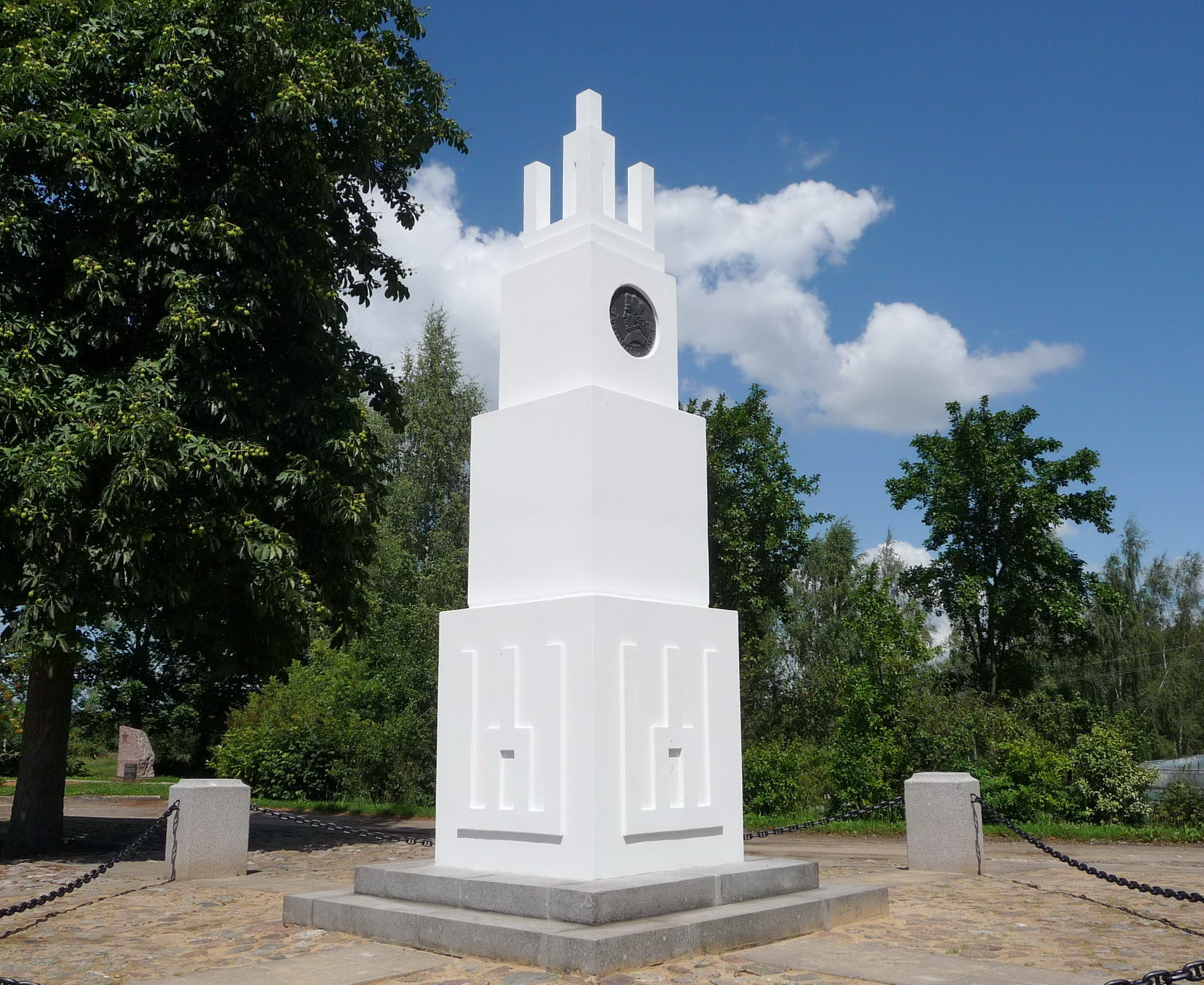
Vytautas the Great Monument

The settlement was first mentioned in 1561 as a village called Duoliebaičiai.

Queen Cecilia Renata, who held the Jurbarkas starostwo as her dower estate, founded a town here under Magdeburg Law, which she named Władysławów (Lithuanian: Vladislavovas) in honor of her husband King Władysław IV, by virtue of a charter dated March 26, 1643. The town was granted a coat of arms featuring a stag’s head with three stars above it. Jews were prohibited from settling in the town. However, the name did not achieve popular usage, and the settlement became known as "a Town" or "a New Town" instead.

In 1647, a wooden parish church was founded by the queen, and a Carmelite monastery was subsequently established alongside it. The Carmelites rebuilt the church in brick in 1788. The monastery was dissolved in 1805.

Despite the formal prohibition, Jews settled in the town and by 1800 made up two-thirds of its population. The town became a significant center of beer and vodka production.

It was annexed by Prussia in the Third Partition of Polish-Lithuanian Commonwealth in 1795. In 1807, it became part of the short-lived Duchy of Warsaw, and after its dissolution in 1815, it became part of newly formed Russian-controlled Congress Poland. The German name Neustadt Schirwindt is derived from the former town of Schirwindt, today a small military village called Kutuzovo, which lay just across the border. In 1900 the town began being referred to as Naumiestis (New Town). Germans began to settle in the town, and by 1857 there were 450 among the 5,516 inhabitants. As a result, in 1842 a branch of the Evangelical parish from Virbalis was established in the town.

Following World War I, it formed part of the reborn independent Lithuania. In 1934 the town was renamed Kudirkos Naumiestis in honor of the Lithuanian patriot and composer of the Lithuanian national anthem, Vincas Kudirka, who lived there from 1895 to his death in 1899 and is buried there.

A well-organized Jewish community also lived there and produced a number of prominent rabbis and Jewish scholars. Its names in Yiddish were נײַשטאָט־שאַקי (Nayshtot-Shaki) and נײַשטאָט־שירווינט (Nayshtot-Shirvint). Before World War II the town had about 700-800 Jewish residents. Journalist and writer Herman Bernstein was born here in 1876 and Rabbi Abba Hillel Silver, who would become a prominent American Jewish leader, was born here in 1893. The Shubert family, which later became prominent in building the American Broadway theatre district, also has its origins here.

During World War II, the town was occupied by the Soviet Union from 1940, then by Nazi Germany from 1941. In 1941, an Einsatzgruppen of Germans and Lithuanian collaborators murdered the local Jewish population in mass executions. Hundreds of people were massacred. The Gestapo also carried out executions of ethnic Jewish prisoners of war from the nearby Oflag 60 POW camp in Schirwindt/Širvinta (now Kutuzovo) in the nearby forest.

== Notable people ==
- Sammy Marks - (Neustadt, 1844–1920), Lithuanian-born industrialist and financier in South Africa. (See Randlord). Born the son of a Jewish tailor.
- Adolph Moses Radin (1848–1909), rabbi
- Pranas Sederevičius (1905-1979), who, from 1951, created concrete sculptures in the garden of his home 'Kudirkos Naumiestis'.
- Max Band (1901-1974), artist.
- Lee Shubert (1871-1953), theatrical producer
- Sam S. Shubert (1878-1905), theatrical producer
- Jacob J. Shubert (1879-1963), theatrical producer
