= Kent Bateman =

American movie producer and director

- Born: Bruce Kent Bateman; October 23, 1936 (age 90); Salt Lake City, Utah, U.S.
- Occupations: Actor; filmmaker
- Children: Justine Bateman; Jason Bateman

Bruce Kent Bateman (born October 23, 1936) is an American film producer and director.

== Personal life ==
Bateman is the father of actors Justine Bateman and Jason Bateman.

Kent was a film producer for Ealing Films (not to be confused with the British Ealing Studios) in the late 1960s and early 1970s in Newton, Massachusetts.

== Filmography ==
- 1971 The Headless Eyes – Director / Screenwriter
- 1976 Death on Credit – Actor
- 1981 Land of No Return – Director / Producer / Screenwriter
- 1987 Teen Wolf Too – Producer
- 1988 Moving Target (NBC Movie of the Week) (starring his son, Jason Bateman) -- Executive Director, Producer
- 1992 Breaking the Rules – Actor: Mr. Stepler / Producer
