= Justine Bateman =

American filmmaker and author (born 1966)

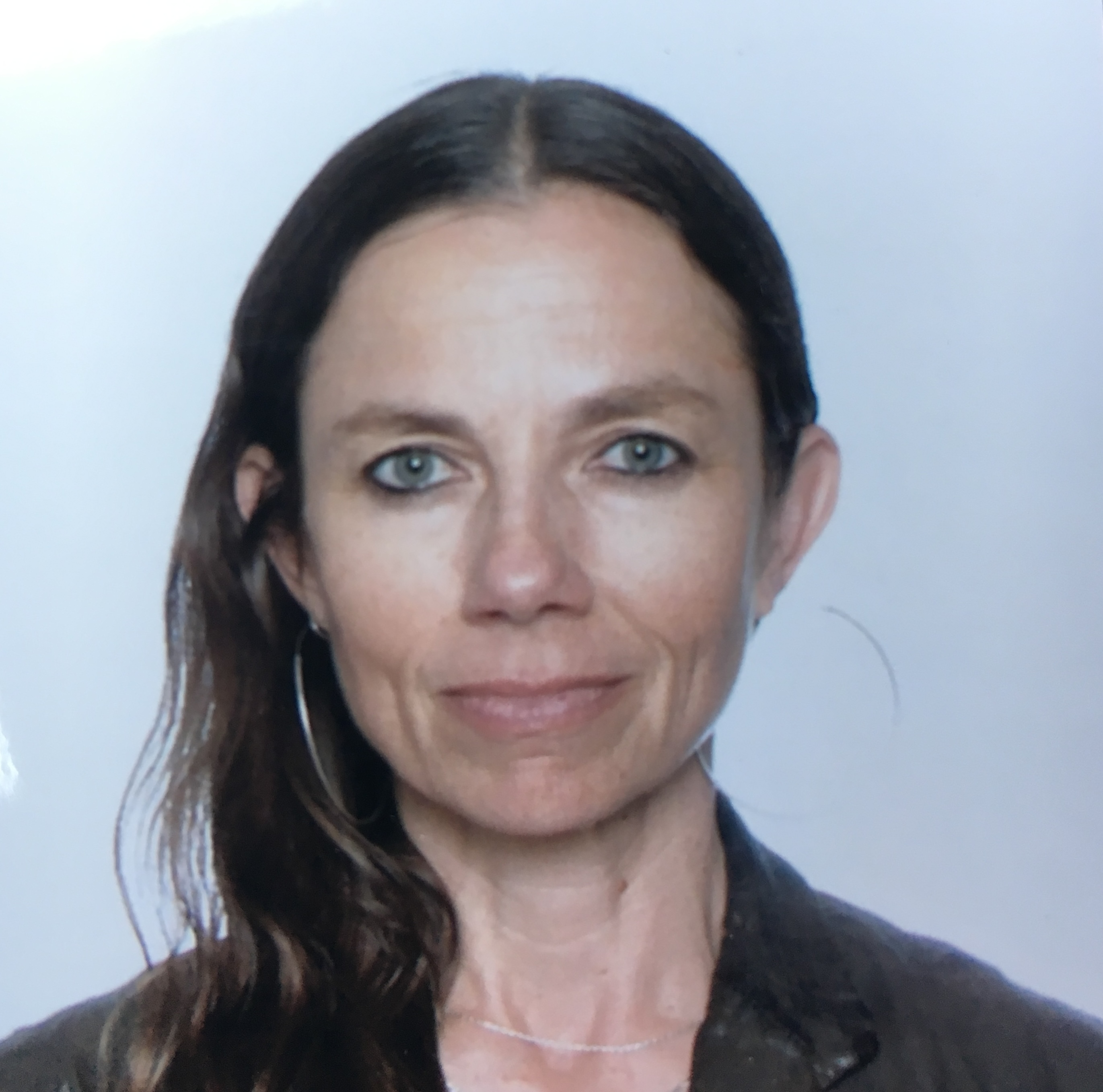
- Bateman in 2018
- Born: February 19, 1966 (age 60)
- Education: University of California, Los Angeles (BA)
- Occupations: Filmmaker; author; actress
- Years active: 1982–present
- Spouse: Mark Fluent (m. 2001)
- Children: 2
- Father: Kent Bateman
- Relatives: Jason Bateman (brother)

Justine Bateman (born February 19, 1966) is an American filmmaker, author and actress. Her acting work has included Family Ties, Satisfaction, Men Behaving Badly, The TV Set, Desperate Housewives, and Californication. Her feature film directorial debut, Violet, starring Olivia Munn, Luke Bracey, and Justin Theroux, premiered at the 2021 SXSW Film Festival. Bateman also wrote, directed and produced the film short Five Minutes, which premiered at the 2017 Toronto International Film Festival. She regularly makes guest appearances on USA television including Fox News and Today and is the author of the books Fame: The Hijacking of Reality (2018) and Face: One Square Foot of Skin (2021).

== Early life ==
Bateman was born to Victoria Elizabeth, a former flight attendant for Pan Am who was born in Malta and later grew up in Birmingham and Shrewsbury in the United Kingdom, and Kent Bateman, an American film producer and director. She is the older sister of actor Jason Bateman.

Bateman attended Taft High School in Woodland Hills, California. She could not attend college immediately after high school, due to her contractual obligations with Family Ties.

== Career ==
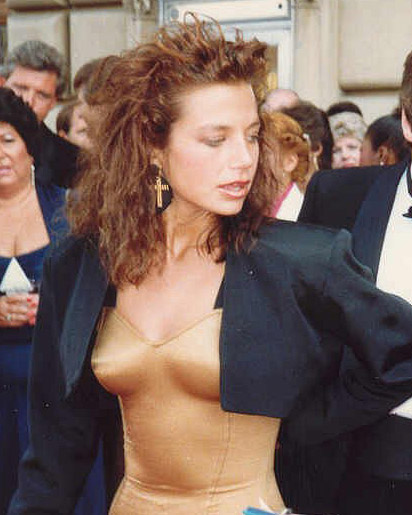
Bateman at the 1987 Primetime Emmy Awards

=== Acting ===
Bateman's most prominent acting role began when she was a teenager, playing the role of superficial Mallory Keaton on the television sitcom Family Ties beginning in 1982; she continued the role throughout the show's run which ended in 1989. She hosted an episode of Saturday Night Live during its 13th season in 1988.

In the 1996–97 NBC American version of the British TV comedy Men Behaving Badly, featuring Rob Schneider and Ron Eldard, she starred as Sarah, Eldard's character's girlfriend. Bateman returned to TV with the 2003 Showtime mini-series Out of Order, alongside Eric Stoltz, Felicity Huffman and William H. Macy.

In the third-season Arrested Development episode "Family Ties," which was broadcast in February 2006, Bateman's character is initially believed to be Michael Bluth's sister, but she turns out to be a prostitute hired by Michael's father George Bluth, and pimped by Michael's brother Gob Bluth. Michael Bluth was played by Bateman's brother Jason.

Recurring roles included Men in Trees, Still Standing, and Desperate Housewives.

In 1988, Bateman starred in the lead role in the motion picture Satisfaction. The film, about an all-girl musical band, also featured Julia Roberts, Liam Neeson, and Britta Phillips. Bateman starred as the lead vocalist and also performed the vocals on the soundtrack. Other films include The Night We Never Met, with Matthew Broderick, and The TV Set, with David Duchovny and Sigourney Weaver.

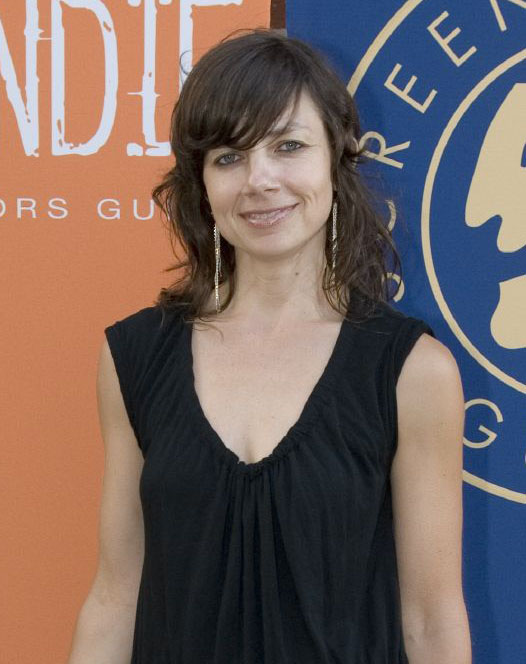
Justine Bateman at LA Film Festival Cocktail Party, 2007

Bateman has acted in several web series. She acted in John August's Remnants, Illeana Douglas' IKEA-sponsored Easy to Assemble (for which in 2010 Bateman was among the winners of the Streamy Award for Best Ensemble Cast and was nominated for a Streamy Award for Best Actress in a Comedy Web-Series), and Anthony Zuiker's digi-novel series Level 26: Dark Prophecy, in which she plays a tarot card reader.

Bateman's theater experience includes Arthur Miller's The Crucible (Roundabout Theater), David Mamet's Speed the Plow (Williamstown Theater Fest), and Frank Wedekind's Lulu (Berkeley Rep).

=== Writer ===
External videos
- Interview with Bateman on Fame at the L.A. Times Festival of Books, April 14, 2019, C-SPAN

Bateman wrote her feature film directorial debut, Violet, premiered at the 2021 SXSW Film Festival. Bateman also wrote her short film directorial debut, Five Minutes. It premiered at the Toronto International Film Festival in 2017. She made her first script sale to Disney's Wizards of Waverly Place. She also co-wrote the adaptation of Lisi Harrison's teenage book series The Clique for a Warner Bros. internet series. Bateman's first book, Fame: The Hijacking of Reality, was published in 2018 by Akashic Books. Her second book, Face: One Square Foot of Skin, was also published by Akashic Books in 2021.

=== Producer ===
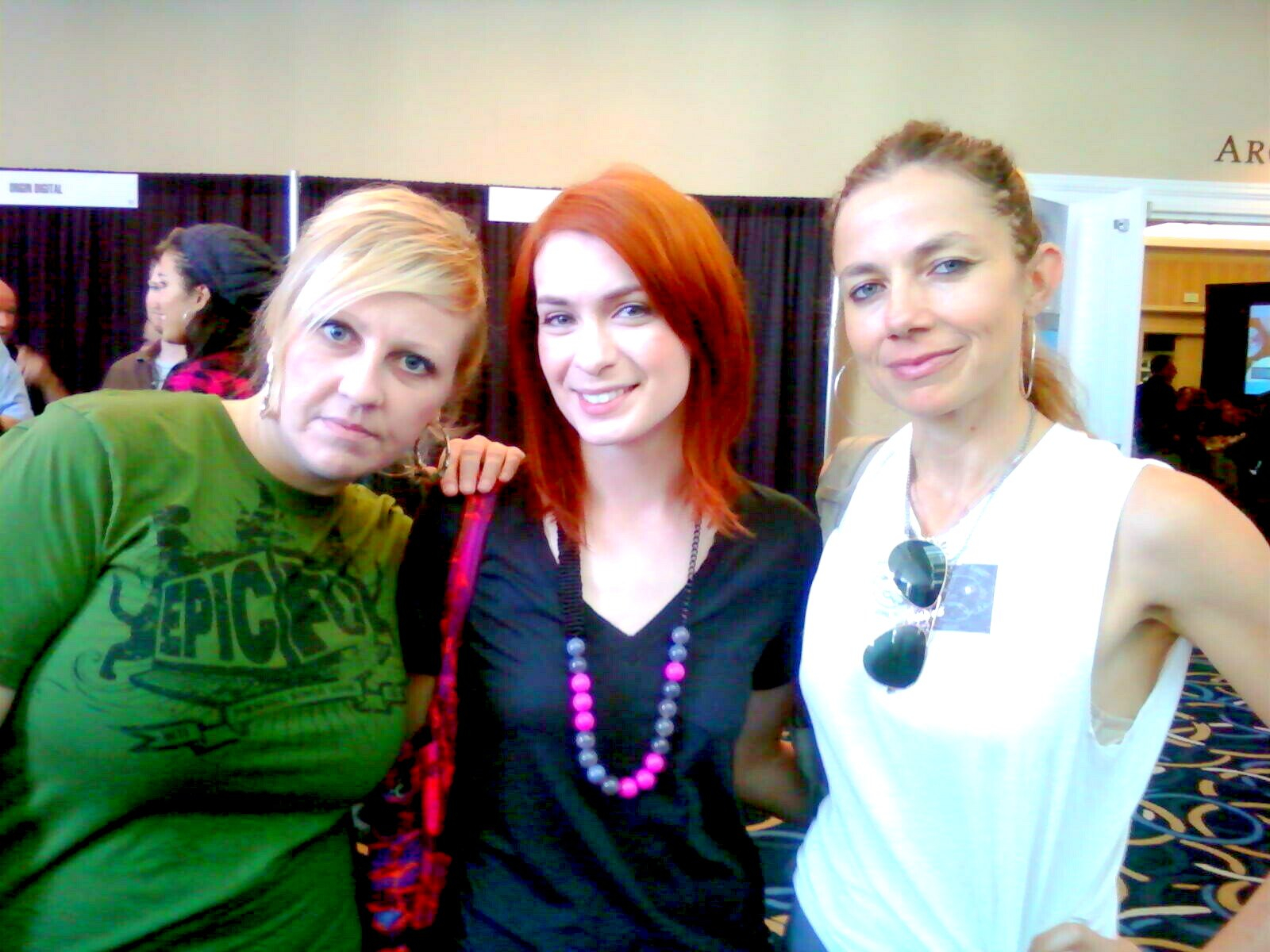
Bateman with Irina Slutsky (left) and Felicia Day at IAWTV meeting during Digital Hollywood 2009.

Bateman co-produced and co-presented with fashion maven Kelly Cutrone on their internet talk show Wake Up and Get Real (WUAGR). Described as an alternative to the television series The View, WUAGR was last broadcast in June 2011. She was also a producer on the internet series Easy to Assemble (which garnered more than 5.1 million views during its second season).

Bateman produced the film short, Z, Five Minutes (Toronto Film Festival 2017 premiere), and Push, and the feature film, Violet (SXSW 2021 Film Festival Premiere). She also produced the upcoming avant-garde feature films, LOOK and FEEL.

Her production company is Section 5.

=== Director ===
Her feature film directorial debut, Violet, starring Olivia Munn, Justin Theroux, and Luke Bracey, premiered at the SXSW 2021 film festival. Her short film directorial debut, Five Minutes, was an official selection at various film festivals, including the 2017 Toronto International Film Festival and the 2018 Tribeca Film Festival. It was a winner in Amazon Prime's Festival Stars competition, and one of Vimeo's Short of the Week.

Her subsequent feature films, LOOK and FEEL, premiered at the CREDO23 Film Festival March 2025.

=== Other work ===
During a hiatus from the entertainment business, Bateman established a clothing design company in 2000. She managed it until its closure in 2003. Justine Bateman Designs was known for one-of-a-kind hand knits. It sold to BendelsNY, Saks Fifth Avenue, and Fred Segal.

She served on the national board of directors of the Screen Actors Guild until July 2009, when she resigned just before the end of her initial three-year term, in a vehement protest to a newly signed film and television contract between SAG and AFTRA.

During the 2020s, she helped spearhead the artistic community's movement to limit "exploitive" AI in film, defining it as a medium that re-configures and regurgitates past human efforts. Bateman is the founder of CREDO23, an "organics stamp" for films and series that assure the audience that no generative AI was used. Justine is also the founder and festival director of the CREDO23 Film Festival.

== Personal life ==
In 2001, Bateman married Mark Fluent, with whom she has two children. An outspoken supporter of net neutrality, she testified before the United States Senate Commerce Committee in support of it in 2008.

Bateman earned a degree in computer science and digital media management from the University of California, Los Angeles (UCLA) in 2016. During the film industry strikes in 2023, Bateman was a vocal critic of the use of AI for human characters in productions, and has proposed a label designating that AI was not used for the actors.

Bateman is a licensed pilot of single-engine planes and a certified scuba diver.

Bateman has been an advocate for natural aging and has not had any cosmetic surgery.

=== Political views ===
In 2024, Bateman criticized The Hollywood Reporter for claiming she was a "well-known supporter of Donald Trump", a claim the publication removed five hours after publishing it. Bateman also chose not to inform the media whom she voted for in the 2024 presidential election.

Following Trump's win in the 2024 presidential election, Bateman declined to state whether she had voted for Trump. Though it was reported that she felt like she can breathe again in a new era, after the momentum necessary for mob "cancellation" ended with the election and Bateman was quoted as saying that she feels like we're "going through the doorway into a new era", adding that she is "100% excited about it".

In 2025, Bateman called the behavior of Prince Harry and Meghan Markle "repulsive" for showing up at a food bank and touring the still-smoldering remnants of houses during the January 2025 Southern California Fire in Altadena, a suburb of Los Angeles. Bateman stated that they were not "politicians" and were only after a "photo op". Bateman called them "disaster tourists".

In 2026, Bateman tweeted at Republican Congressman Chip Roy, "We hear about mosques in your state more than any other, besides Michigan. We don’t need to hear your impassioned interview appearances about it; we need you guys to DO something. You guys run the US government. DO something,"

== Filmography ==
=== Film ===
Year	Title	Role	Notes
1988	Satisfaction	Jennie Lee	
1990	The Closer	Jessica Grant	
1992	Primary Motive	Darcy Link	
1993	Beware of Dog	Linda Irving	
1993	The Night We Never Met	Janet Beehan	
1996	The Acting Thing	Unknown	Short film
1996	God's Lonely Man	Meradith	
1996	Kiss & Tell	Molly McMannis	
1999	Say You'll Be Mine	Chelsea	
2002	Highball	Sandy	
2005	Trailer for a Remake of Gore Vidal's Caligula	Attia, Imperial Courtesan	Short film
2006	The TV Set	Natalie Klein	
2013	Deep Dark Canyon	Cheryl Cavanaugh	
2021	Violet	—N/a	Director, writer, producer

=== Television ===
Year	Title	Role	Notes
1982–1989	Family Ties	Mallory Keaton	176 episodes
1984	It's Your Move	Debbie	Episode: "Pajama Party"
1984	Tales from the Darkside	Susan 'Pookie' Anderson	Episode: "Mookie and Pookie"
1985	ABC Afterschool Special	Sara White	Episode: "First the Egg"
1985	Right to Kill?	Deborah Jahnke	Television movie
1985	Family Ties Vacation	Mallory Keaton	Television movie
1986	Can You Feel Me Dancing?	Karin Nichols	Television movie
1986	Scary Tales	Molly	Episode: "Night Elevator"
1986	How Can I Tell If I'm Really In Love	Herself	Educational classroom video
1988	Mickey's 60th Birthday	Mallory Keaton	Television movie
1990	The Fatal Image	Megan Brennan	Television movie
1992	Deadbolt	Marty Hiller	Television movie
1992	In the Eyes of a Stranger	Lynn Carlson	Television movie
1994	Terror in the Night	Robin Andrews	Television movie
1994	Another Woman	Lisa Temple	Television movie
1995	A Bucket of Blood	Carla	Television movie
1996	Lois & Clark: The New Adventures of Superman	Sarah/Zara	4 episodes
1996	Men Behaving Badly	Sarah Stretten	22 episodes
1999	Rugrats	Art Patron	Episode: "Opposites Attract"/"The Art Museum"
2002	Ozzy & Drix	Rota	Episode: "Gas of Doom"
2003	Out of Order	Annie	6 episodes
2004	Still Standing	Terry	3 episodes
2004	Humor Me	Paula	Television movie
2004	The Hollywood Mom's Mystery	Lucy Freers	Television movie
2006	Arrested Development	Nellie Bluth	Episode: "Family Ties"
2006	To Have and to Hold	Meg	Television movie
2006	Men in Trees	Lynn Barstow	10 episodes
2007	Hybrid	Andrea	Television movie
2008, 2012	Desperate Housewives	Ellie Leonard	5 episodes
2008, 2012	Californication	Mrs. Patterson	2 episodes
2008, 2012	Easy to Assemble	Justine Bateman	12 episodes
2009	Psych	Victoria	Episode: "Tuesday the 17th"
2009	Celebrity Ghost Stories	Herself	Episode: "1.7"
2010	Private Practice	Sydney	Episode: "Short Cuts"
2011	Criminal Minds: Suspect Behavior	Margaret	Episode: "See No Evil"
2013	Modern Family	Angela	Episode: "The Future Dunphys"

== Awards ==
Awards	Year	Category	Work	Result
Golden Globe Awards	1987	Best Supporting Actress - Series, Miniseries or Television Film	Family Ties	Nominated
Primetime Emmy Awards	1986	Outstanding Supporting Actress in a Comedy Series	Family Ties	Nominated
Primetime Emmy Awards	1987	Outstanding Supporting Actress in a Comedy Series	Family Ties	Nominated
Satellite Award	2003	Best Supporting Actress – Series, Miniseries or Television Film	Out of Order	Won
Young Artist Award	1983	Best Young Actress in a Comedy Series	Family Ties	Nominated
Young Artist Award	1984	Best Young Actress in a Comedy Series	Family Ties	Won
