= Moravian Church music =

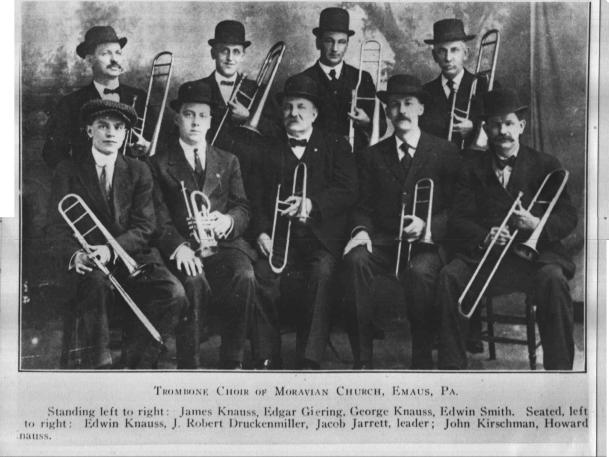
Trombone Choir of the Moravian Church in Emmaus, Pennsylvania, c.1900

The Moravian musical tradition in United States began with the earliest Moravian settlers in the first half of the 18th century.

These Moravians were members of a well-established church – officially called Unitas Fratrum or Unity of Brethren – that by [the mid-18th century] had already seen almost three centuries of rich experience of religious life. They were spiritual descendants of the Czech priest Jan Hus, who for his attempts at reform was martyred in 1415. Forty-two years later in 1457, some of his followers founded a church body consecrated to following Christ in simplicity and dedicated living.

This newly constituted church developed a rich and orderly ecclesiastical life in the 15th and 16th centuries, but in the Thirty Years War of 1618-48 it was virtually wiped out. In the 1720s a few exiles of this religious heritage, along with various other seekers after truth, found refuge on an estate of a Saxon nobleman named Nicholaus Ludwig von Zinzendorf. There in their village of Herrnhut the ancient church experienced a rebirth culminating in a spiritual blessing on August 13, 1727, in which their former diversity of purpose was welded into one.

In a brief five years, by 1732, that first little village of the Renewed Moravian Church began sending missionaries to all corners of the world. After establishing work in England, the Moravians sent colonists to America in 1735. The initial settlement in Georgia proved unsuccessful, partly because of war between Protestant England and Catholic Spain to the south in Florida. More permanent work was established in Pennsylvania in 1741, with the town of Bethlehem as their chief center. Other settlements in Pennsylvania followed. The Moravians purchased 100,000 acres (400 km²) in North Carolina and settled at Bethabara in 1753 with the central town of Salem being founded in 1766.” [Villages of the Lord]

== History ==
From its very beginning the Unitas Fratrum, or Moravian Church, kept and preserved careful and meticulous records of church, community, and commercial life. Along with this emphasis on record-keeping, the Moravians maintained active communication with other Moravian centers in Europe and throughout the world. This dedication to sharing and receiving information continues today through the worldwide Moravian Unity, including Africa and the Caribbean.

Along with their rich devotional life and their missionary fervor, the Moravians maintained their high regard for education and their love of music as an essential part of life. Moravian composers – also serving as teachers, pastors, and church administrators – were well versed in the European Classical tradition of music, and wrote thousands of anthems, solo arias, duets, and the like for their worship services, for voices accompanied not only by organ but also by string orchestras supplemented by woodwinds and brasses. In addition, these musicians copied thousands of works by the best-known and loved European composers of their day – Carl Stamitz, Haydn, Carl Friedrich Abel, Adalbert Gyrowetz, Mozart, the Bach family, and many whose names have descended into relative obscurity. This rich collection of music manuscripts and early imprints comprises nearly 10,000 manuscripts and printed works, with some works appearing in several individual collections. The collections originating in North Carolina are housed in the Moravian Music Foundation headquarters in Winston-Salem, NC; those originating in Moravian centers in Pennsylvania and Ohio are housed in the Moravian Archives, Northern Province in Bethlehem, PA.

The musical life in the Moravian settlements was rich and became respected by many in the young country. This musical life included sacred vocal music for worship services, including, of course, hymns; brass ensembles, especially trombones, serving specific sociological and liturgical functions; and instrumental ensemble music for recreation, ranging from works for unaccompanied solo instrument to symphonies and large oratorios.

A musicologist who knows nothing of the Moravian Church or of its theology and life in the 18th and 19th centuries can analyze and certainly appreciate Moravian music. However, the more one knows of the Moravian Church, its life and worship, the more adequate and helpful is the appreciation and understanding of the music. Nearly all of the sacred vocal music written by Moravian composers was for use in worship services. Because of the Moravian penchant for recording the crucial factors in their lives, and for preserving these records in their archives, there is ample means of knowing in depth the context in which the early Moravian composers lived, wrote, and performed.

In the thought of Zinzendorf, and of the Moravians of his time, all life was seen as “liturgical”. That is, every aspect of life, even the most mundane, was a sort of worship to be offered to God, after the example of Christ himself. For this reason, such normally “secular” matters as beginning a new business or reaping the fields had a religious connotation. To give this ideal of life concrete expression and to nurture the soul of those who would live it, practical realities naturally led to the development of various worship services and devotions which gave the Moravian communities a character of their own. Each day began and ended with worship, both in smaller groups within the community (divided by age and condition of life) and with the community as a whole.

A significant addition to Moravian worship materials was made with the introduction of the Losungen, or Daily Texts, in 1728. This could be a private devotional, but it assumed corporate congregational importance as well. From the time of the first printed Text Book (1731), Moravians throughout the world have used these texts as a daily devotional guide, either in private devotions or in the brief morning or evening services for the whole congregation or a specific part of it.

While the 18th century Losungen were generally drawn from Scripture texts, they might also consist of a hymn stanza or a portion thereof. This was characteristic of the Moravian Church, for it was in its hymnody and music that it expressed its theology most frequently and visibly.

Zinzendorf encouraged the development of hymn singing. In the early days of Herrnhut, when the community did not yet enjoy a large repertoire of hymns, he conducted singing classes in which not only the hymns, but something of the life and purpose of the author was learned. A large hymnal was produced in 1735 and many more texts were added in its numerous appendices. A slightly more manageable collection was made in 1754 and 1767. In 1778 there appeared the extremely influential hymnbook of Christian Gregor, which remained in use among the German-speaking congregations for about a century. This contained 1750 hymns, 308 of them written or recast by Gregor himself. Gregor's procedure in compiling these hymns is also instructive: he often took familiar stanzas from originally different hymns and put them together into one hymn, sometimes weaving them together with new stanzas of his own.

In 1784, Gregor edited a Choralbuch which contained the most-frequently-used tunes for these hymns. In this book he cleaned up and added to a tune numbering system developed earlier in the century – a system by which tunes of the same meter share a number and are distinguished from one another by a letter. For instance, all the “tune 22s” are long-meter tunes with 8 syllables in each of their four lines. Tunes with the same number are interchangeable with regard to their meter, although the selection of which particular tune to use with which text is a choice requiring care and experience. The church bands still use this system today, with tunes called by number rather than name.

Gregor's procedure of recombining and adding to the stanzas of hymns may sound a bit unusual. In fact, that is a very Moravian thing to do, and indeed this sort of approach, which combined new and old hymn stanzas in creative ways, was central to that most characteristic of Moravian services, the Singstunde. In a Singstunde, the person in charge selects with care individual stanzas from various hymns in such a manner that they will develop some Christian truth or theme as the singing progresses. In the 18th century, the congregation, which possessed an unusual command of the hymnal, would fall in with the leader before he reached the end of the first line of each stanza, singing by heart. No address was given on such occasions as none was needed. And even now, the first-line index to the Moravian Book of Worship includes first lines of all stanzas, not just the first.

== Categories of Moravian music ==
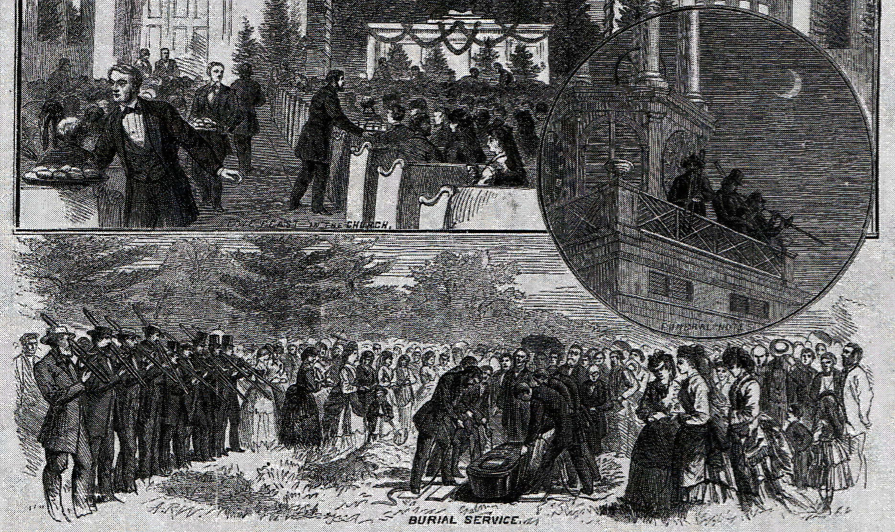
When a member of the church dies, it is announced by the trombone choir from the belfry of the church. While the funeral service is being held in the church, the body of the deceased lies in the Corpse House at the rear of the church. After the service, the coffin is placed on a bier and covered with a white cloth, as it is borne to the cemetery. At the grave a responsive service, participated in by the minister and the people, and with trombone accompaniment, is rendered. See also aequales.

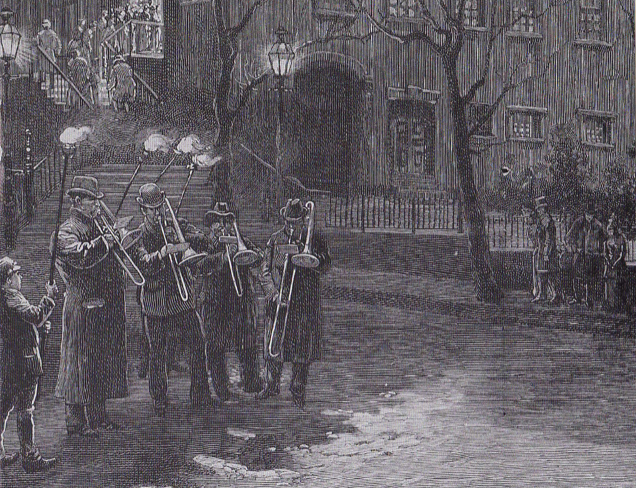
A four-trombone choir plays by torchlight on Easter Day, to announce the Easter sunrise service in Bethlehem, Pennsylvania.

The richest body of Moravian music is that composed for worship. However, there are other aspects of the musical life of the American Moravians which should not be overlooked.

First is what is most likely the best known aspect of Moravian music: the trombone choirs. Moravians have used brass ensembles and bands since their earliest years in Herrnhut to announce special events and to accompany singing at outdoor services and funerals. The Easter Band for the sunrise service in Salem numbers some 500 band members representing the 12 congregations of the Salem Congregation (the Moravian churches in Winston-Salem, NC) as well as players from across the country. Moravian chorales used by the trombone choirs and church bands tend to be fairly stately and to have active parts for all four voices, which reflects the singing of a congregation – also singing in parts.

The second type of music is the secular instrumental music in the Moravian collections. This includes some music by Moravian composers, but by far the greater part of the instrumental music is not by Moravians, instead by composers who were the most popular ones in Europe in the middle 18th century and later. Moravians seemed to have a voracious appetite for new music and collected, purchased, and copied everything they could get their hands on. American Moravian music collections contain several thousand pieces by composers as well known as Haydn, Johann Christoph Friedrich Bach, Karl Stamitz; and as little known as Wenzel Pichl, Adalbert Gyrowetz, and Kleinknecht. What the Moravians have in their instrumental collections is a cross-section of the musical culture out of which the masters arose – the cultural sea in which Haydn, Mozart, and Beethoven were swimming. Many of these works in the American Moravian collections are “only known surviving” copies of music from these composers.

Moravian contributions to the instrumental works, while fairly few in number, are significant. An example is David Moritz Michael’s “Water Journey” for woodwind sextet, which was written for a holiday outing along the Lehigh River in Bethlehem, PA. Musicians played on a barge and floated down the river while the townspeople strolled along the bank.

There are also string works by Moravian composers. John Antes (1740–1811) wrote a set of three string trios, which are lovely and challenging and have been recorded. These trios were published in England prior to 1795 under the name “Giovanni A-T-S, Dillettante Americano”. They are the earliest known chamber music written by a composer born in America. Antes was born in Pennsylvania and served the Moravian Church as a missionary in Egypt. In addition to the trios we have, he also wrote some string quartets which are now missing. The truly international scope of the Moravian Church can be seen in the story of these quartets: here was an American-born missionary in Egypt, sending copies of his string quartets to an American diplomat in France, quartets which he had written for an English nobleman and his associates in India. His three trios were dedicated to the Swedish ambassador in Constantinople. These trios have been published by the Moravian Music Foundation in a scholarly edition.

Also by a Moravian composer are the six string quintets (two violins, two violas, and cello) by Johann Friedrich Peter. These were written in Salem, NC in 1789. Peter was probably the most gifted and accomplished Moravian composer. In addition to these string quintets, he wrote nearly 100 vocal works.

"Secular" groups—chamber ensembles and concert bands—developed along a parallel stream to the "trombone choirs". While the trombone choirs and church bands focus their attention primarily on chorales, the community bands and chamber ensembles play primarily what we would now call "secular" music -- chamber music, marches, dances, arrangements of popular music of various sorts. These groups provide not only entertainment for player and audience alike but also enable the players to improve through playing more challenging music.

By the 1780s the Bethlehem Collegium musicum was playing the music of the best composers of the day—Bach's sons, Hasse, Stamitz, Haydn, and many others, now lesser known. Other Collegia musica were founded -- Lititz (c. 1765), Nazareth (c. 1780), and Salem (c. 1786) -- the latter continuing on until about 1835. The increasing demand for music by these groups stimulated the American Moravians to a veritable frenzy of copying and transcribing from European masterworks as well as composing their own works. The Salem Collegium musicum collection holds about 500 compositions, of which about 150 are in manuscript form. String music is prevalent in all of the instrumental music collections, with genres ranging from works for unaccompanied violin through classical symphonies.

The final aspect and the “heart and soul” of Moravian music is the sacred vocal music. This was music specifically written for worship services. Moravians wrote thousands of anthems, solos, and duets for voices accompanied by chamber orchestra – a rarity in colonial America. In 1783, Moravians in Salem held the first celebration of July 4 in the country with a challenging music program assembled by Johann Friedrich Peter. This work was titled the Psalm of Joy.

== Characteristics of Moravian vocal music ==
- They are based upon biblical or hymn texts, often the Daily Text assigned for the day of the first presentation of the work.
- The voice parts tend to move all together so that the words can be understood rather than any imitative writing such as Bach would do. In this way the Moravians resemble Handel more than Bach.
- They often have elaborate instrumental introductions and interludes, but the instrumental parts provide support when the voices are singing rather than drawing attention away from the text.
- Thus they are straightforward, well-crafted works like other Moravian arts and crafts.

== The American Moravian music collections ==
These include:

- Manuscript and printed orders of service from the 18th century forward
- Manuscript and printed instructional books in music
- Sacred music: hundreds of manuscript anthems, vocal duets, and vocal solos, dating from the 19th and early 19th centuries, mostly written by Moravians in an early-Classical style with accompaniment by chamber orchestra
- Hymnals dating from the 16th century to the present in languages ranging from English and German to Afrikaans and Czech
- Instrumental music: hundreds of manuscript and printed works ranging in size from solo sonatas to symphonies by a wide range of European composers, some of which are the only known surviving copies (such as the Symphony in E Major by JCF Bach)
- Bound collections of sheet music dating from the mid-19th century forward, including a piano exercises book containing the first printing of the Star Spangled Banner, one of only nine surviving copies
- Music books and some correspondence of the band of the 26th NC Regiment from the Civil War, which are particularly instructive about the battle of Gettysburg, the siege of Petersburg, and the road to Appomattox. There is a complete set of band books (all parts) from the 26th NC Regimental Band as well as individual part books believed to be from the 21st and 33rd NC Regimental Bands.
- A growing collection of music written by living, contemporary American Moravian composers

== The Moravian Music Foundation ==
Moravian sacred vocal music was used in Moravian worship in America through the early part of the 19th century. With the gradual change from German to English services however, the musicians found that it was often easier to write a new work in English that it was to translate one from German to English and make it “singable”. As the American Moravians became more “American”, their old style music fell out of favor. Because of the penchant of Moravians to carefully keep their old stuff, the music was not discarded completely. Instead it was packed away in boxes, envelopes, and even a cracker barrel. Nearly a century later in the 1940s, scholars began to ask questions about this old music. As cataloging and research efforts were undertaken, scholars found that there was a great deal of this music and that much of it was of high quality. The first “Early American Moravian Music Festival” was held in Bethlehem, PA in 1950 and was conducted by Dr. Thor Johnson. The success of that experience led to another festival in 1954 and another in 1955. Recognizing the amount of hard work involved simply in preparing music for these Festivals, a group of clergy and laymen worked together to organize the Moravian Music Foundation in 1956 to do just that.

Choir and Orchestra of the 2006 Moravian Music Festival in Columbus, OH

The Moravian Music Foundation's mission is to preserve, share, and celebrate the musical culture of Moravians. It is an independent 501(c)(3) non profit, tax-exempt corporation with two offices: the headquarters in Winston-Salem, North Carolina, and an office and archives in Bethlehem, Pennsylvania. There are four staff members, as well as part-time contract staff hired as needed for special projects as funding permits. The Moravian Music Foundation is governed by a Board of Trustees, of whom twelve are appointed by the Moravian Church in America and its constituent bodies, and from nine to sixteen are elected by the Board of Trustees itself. The operations of the Moravian Music Foundation are largely funded by individual contributions, with some support garnered from sales and royalties revenue, grants for special projects, and annual support from the Moravian Church in America.

The Foundation is custodian and curator of the music collections of the Moravian Church in America. Contracts between the constituent bodies of the Moravian Church and the Moravian Music Foundation empower the Foundation to edit, publish, record, and otherwise disseminate this music. The Foundation has overseen the publication of over 400 works with some two million copies in circulation worldwide. These published works contain a brief historical introduction to the Moravian musical culture. Forty-four orchestra works from American Moravian collections have been edited and placed in the Fleisher Collection of the Philadelphia Free Library and are thus available for loan to orchestras around the world. The Foundation continues to produce scholarly musical editions for study and performance, and has begun a series of “simplified arrangements” of Moravian vocal works intended for smaller choirs.

The Moravian Music Foundation is involved in a long-term project to produce high quality recordings of the works of the major American Moravian composers (beginning with the works of Johann Friedrich Peter, David Moritz Michael, John Antes, and Johannes Herbst). A working relationship has been established with New World Records, the producers of the Recorded Anthology of American Music. Under this agreement, the Foundation produces scholarly editions of the works to be recorded, arranges for the recordings, and oversees the production of detailed historical liner notes with each recording.

The Foundation is also the custodian of several privately owned collections, and has received some important collections from other than Moravian sources. The largest of these is the collection of musical Americana donated by Irving Lowens. This collection contains some 2,000 volumes including American hymnals and psalm books from the 18th and 19th centuries. While neither Moravian in content nor in origin, the Lowens Collection is an extremely valuable resource for hymnological study, both in music and texts.

The Moravian Music Foundation manages music lending libraries of three types: sacred choral anthems; instrumental parts to edited and published Moravian anthems; and edited instrumental works from the Moravian collections. With each loan, information is available regarding Moravian history and culture, composer biographies, and the context in which the music was written and used.

To support research into the musical holdings, the Foundation's Winston-Salem headquarters houses the Peter Memorial Library, a research collection of some 6,000 volumes specializing in Protestant church music and American music history. This library (while not a circulating collection) is open to the public. The Foundation provides research guidance for graduate degree studies; most recently completely and ongoing doctoral studies involve candidates from Catholic University, Cincinnati Conservatory, New York University, and Temple University. The Foundation also produces its own research.

The Moravian Music Foundation provides programming consultation for over a dozen professional music groups worldwide, as well as for college and community special events.. The Foundation also serves as music director for the regular Moravian Music Festivals presented by the Moravian Church. These festivals occur every three to five years, alternating between the Northern and Southern Provinces of the Moravian Church in America, and attract some 300 people from around the world. Festivals include concerts, seminars, and workshops. Newly edited pieces from the Moravian collections are showcased during Festival concerts.

The Foundation publishes a quarterly Newsletter; monographs on specific topics; catalogs of its collections in book form; the Companion to the Moravian Book of Worship; and several editions of sheet music edited from the Moravian collections. It also self produces CDs in addition to those produced by New World Records.

The Moravian Music Foundation works with two resident mixed-voice choral groups, the Moramus Chorale based in Winston-Salem, North Carolina, and the Unitas Chorale based in the Lehigh Valley area of Pennsylvania. These groups share Moravian vocal music by performing regularly in their local communities. Occasionally they employ instrumental ensembles to accompany them and to perform some of the many instrumental pieces found in the Moravian collections. In addition to the Moramus and Unitas Chorales, the Moravian Music Foundation has provided music and programming support to Moravian College in Bethlehem, PA; North Carolina School of the Arts; Magnolia Baroque Festival; Rollins College in Winter Park, FL; the American Brass Quintet; and Carolina Pro Musica, as well as to various Moravian and other denomination churches, community ensembles, and other professional groups.

== Conclusion ==
For the Moravians, music has always been seen as a necessity of life, not as a luxury. Moravians have always used their music to express their faith, to communicate their faith, and to enjoy each other's company, and continue to do so today. The musical heritage of the Moravians is a living tradition that is still evolving. The Moravian tradition of the trombone choir continues today with trombone choirs in various Moravian communities and in the church bands active in most Moravian congregations. The tradition of secular instrumental music continues in the Moravian church centers of North Carolina, Pennsylvania, and Ohio through various community music ensembles. The sacred music tradition continues as well, both in preserving and sharing the old music and in writing new.

== Recordings ==
- Lost Music of Early America. Music of the Moravians. Boston Baroque/Martin Pearlman, conductor. Performed on Period Instruments. Telarc CD-80482
- The Water Journey by David Moritz Michael. Includes Parthien 1 and 2. Pacific Classical Winds. New World Records 80490–2
- By a Spring by David Moritz Michael. Includes Parthien 3, 4, and 5. Pacific Classical Winds. New World Records 80531–2
- Parthien 6-9 by David Moritz Michael. Pacific Classical Winds. New World Records 80538–2
- Parthien 10-14 by David Moritz Michael. Pacific Classical Winds. New World Records 80580–2
- John Antes' String Trios and Johann Friedrich Peter's String Quintets. American Moravian Chamber Ensemble. New World Records 80507–2
- Storm in the Land: Music of the 26th NC Regimental Band, CSA. American Brass Quintet Brass Band. New World Records 80608–2
- Cheer, Boys, Cheer!: Music of the 26th NC Regimental Band, CSA. American Brass Quintet Brass Band. New World Records 80652–2
- Joining Our Voices: Moravian Hymns. Moravian Music Foundation
- Mit Freuden Zart: Moravian Chorales for Band. Giannini Brass. Moravian Music Foundation
- Sing O Ye Heavens. Bach Festival Choir and Orchestra of Winter Park, FL.
- Rejoice, Rejoice, Believers: Moravian Advent and Christmas. Moravian Music Foundation
- Music for All Seasons The Moravian Trombone Choir of Downey and the Los Angeles Philharmonic Trombone Ensemble. Crystal Records
