= 1811 in music =

== Events ==
- None listed

== Popular music ==
- "Bubble, Squeak and Pettitoes" aka "Mr. Grig and Mrs. Snap" sung by Joseph Grimaldi in Harlequin and Blue Beard

== Classical music ==
- Ludwig van Beethoven
  - Piano Trio No. 7 (the "Archduke")
  - Die Ruinen von Athen ("The Ruins of Athens")
- Johann Nepomuk Hummel – 12 German Dances and Coda for Redout-Deutsche
- Peter Casper Krossing – Symphony in C minor
- Giacomo Meyerbeer – Gott und die Natur (oratorio)
- Franz Xaver Wolfgang Mozart – Piano Concerto No. 1 in C major opus 14
- George Onslow – Duo for Piano 4 hands no 1 in E minor
- Ferdinand Ries
  - Horn Sonata, Op. 34
  - 3 Violin Sonatas, Op. 38
  - Piano Concerto No.2, Op. 42
  - String Quintet, Op. 68
  - Concerto for 2 Horns, WoO 19
- Joseph Wölfl – Piano Concerto No. 6 in D major "Le coucou", Op. 49

== Opera ==
- Carl Maria von Weber – Abu Hassan

== Births ==
- January 21 – Mademoiselle Ambroisine, ballet dancer (d. 1882)
- February 4 – Aristide Cavaillé-Coll, organ builder (d. 1899)
- March 13 – Camille-Marie Stamaty, composer and pianist (d. 1870)
- March 23 – Carl Gottfried Wilhelm Taubert, composer (d. 1891)
- May 22 – Giulia Grisi, operatic soprano (d. 1869)
- July 19 – Vincenz Lachner, composer (d. 1893)
- August 5 – Ambroise Thomas, opera composer (d. 1896)
- August 25 – August Gottfried Ritter, organist and composer (d. 1885)
- August 31 – Adolfina Fägerstedt, ballerina (d. 1902)
- September – Charles Frederick Hempel, organist and composer (d. 1867)
- September 29 – Adam Darr, guitarist, singer and composer (d. 1866)
- October 16 – Gaetano Capocci, conductor and composer (d. 1898)
- October 22 – Franz Liszt, pianist and composer (d. 1886)
- October 24 – Ferdinand Hiller, pianist, composer and conductor (d. 1885)
- November 11 – François Delsarte, operatic tenor and singing teacher (d. 1871)
- November 26 – Franz Brendel, music critic (d. 1868)
- December 8 – Louis Schindelmeisser, clarinettist, conductor and composer (d. 1864)
- December 23 – Yevdokiya Rostopchina, lyricist and noble (died 1858)
- undated – Francis Hartwell Henslowe, public servant and composer (died 1878)
- probable – James Hill, folk musician (d. 1853)

== Deaths ==
- February 27 – Joseph Leutgeb, horn virtuoso, 78
- March 19 – František Adam Míča, composer, 65
- April 15 – Ernest Louis Muller, composer
- May 12 – Louis-Charles-Joseph Rey, composer and cellist, 72
- July 13 – Pierre Laujon, chansonnier (b. 1727)
- July 19 – Christian Gotthilf Tag, composer
- August 18 – Johann Heinrich Zang, composer
- August 20 – Dorothea Wendling, operatic soprano, 75
- September 6
  - Julien-Amable Mathieu, composer
  - Ignaz Fränzl, violinist and composer, 75
- September 14 – Johanna Löfblad, actress and singer (b. 1733)
- 13 October – Johann Friedrich Schubert, composer
- December 7 – Ignaz Spangler, composer
- date unknown
  - John Antes, composer, 71
  - Barbara Ployer, pianist (b. 1765)
  - Louis-Abet Deffroy de Reigny, composer
  - Sir Peter Beckford, English peerage, patron of Muzio Clementi, 70
  - Thomas Ebdon, composer and organist (b. 1738)
