= Knecht =

Knecht, in German and Dutch, means a male servant, especially a farmhand. Etymologically, it is the cognate of English "knight".

It may refer to:

== People ==
- Bill Knecht (1930–1996), American rower
- Dalton Knecht (born 2001), American basketball player
- Émile Knecht (1923–2019), Swiss rower
- Guillaume Knecht, rugby league footballer of the 1990s and 2000s
- Hans Knecht (1913–1996), Swiss road racing cyclist
- John Knecht (born 1947), American filmmaker
- Joseph Knecht (1864–1931), Austrian conductor
- Justin Heinrich Knecht (1752–1817), German composer
- Karl Kae Knecht (1883–1972), American artist
- Peter Knecht (1936–2014), American attorney
- Reuben Knecht Bachman (1834–1911), American politician
- Robert Knecht (1926–2023), British historian
- Katarína Knechtová (1981-), Slovak singer

== Companies ==
- Gebr. Knecht AG, a Swiss bus transportation company

== See also ==
- Kleinknecht, Wagenknecht
- Knecht Ruprecht, companion of Saint Nicholas in German folklore
- Knechtel, a surname
