= Shubert =

Shubert may refer to:

== People ==
- Shubert (surname)
- Shubert Pereira (born 1998), Indian footballer
- Shubert Spero (born 1923), American rabbi and author

== Places ==
- Shubert, Nebraska, a village in Richardson County

== Theatrical ==
- Shubert Foundation, owner of The Shubert Organization, founded in 1945
- The Shubert Organization, owner of various American theaters, founded c. 1900
- Shubert Theatre (disambiguation), various American theaters

== See also ==
- Schubart (disambiguation)
- Schubert (disambiguation)
