= Schubert (surname) =

Schubert is a German and Jewish occupational surname literally meaning "shoemaker". Notable people with the surname include:

- Adam Schubert (born 1985), Australian professional rugby league footballer
- Albrecht Schubert (1886–1966), German general
- Alexander Schubert (born 1979), German composer
- André Schubert (born 1971), German football player and coach
- Bernard Schubert (1895–1988), American screenwriter and television producer
- Boris Schubert (1906–1983), Russian-French geologist better known as Boris Choubert
- Christoph Schubert (born 1982), German professional ice hockey player
- Cordula Schubert (born 1959), German politician
- David Schubert (1913–1946), American poet
- Ernő Schubert (1881–1931), Hungarian track and field athlete
- Éva Schubert (1931–2017), Hungarian actress
- Ferdinand Schubert (1794–1859), Austrian composer, brother of Franz Schubert
- François Schubert (1808–1878), German composer
- František Schubert (1894–1942), Czech chess master
- Franz Schubert (1797–1828), Austrian songwriter and composer
- Franziska Schubert (born 1982), German politician
- Friedrich von Schubert (1789–1865), Russian explorer and cartographer
- Friedrich Schubert (1897–1947), German World War II war criminal
- Gerald Schubert (1939–2025), American geophysicist
- Gotthilf Heinrich von Schubert (1780–1860), German physician and naturalist
- Grant Schubert (born 1980), Australian field hockey player
- Günter Schubert (1938–2008), German actor
- Heinrich Carl Schubert (1827–1897), Austrian painter
- Heinz Schubert (composer) (1908–1945), German composer and conductor
- Heinz Schubert (SS officer) (1914–1987), German SS officer
- Heinz Schubert (actor) (1925–1999), German actor
- Helga Schubert (born 1940), German psychologist and author
- Hermann Schubert (1848–1911), German mathematician, founder of the Schubert calculus
- Hermann Schubert (politician) (1886–1938), German politician
- Horst Schubert (1919–2001), German mathematician
- Ian Schubert (born 1956), Australian rugby league footballer
- Jiří Schubert (born 1988), Czech professional football player
- Johann Andreas Schubert (1808–1870), German engineer and academic
- Johann Friedrich Schubert (1769–1811), German composer
- Joseph Schubert (disambiguation), several people
- Július Schubert (1922–1949), Slovak-Hungarian footballer
- Karin Schubert (born 1944), German actress
- Karsten Schubert (1961–2019), German art dealer and publisher
- Katharina Schubert (born 1963), German actress
- Keith Glen Schubert (born 1980), American drag queen known as Tammie Brown
- Kevin Schubert (1927–2007), Australian rugby league footballer
- Kort Schubert (born 1979), American rugby union footballer
- Lisa Schubert (born 2002), German politician
- Marie Schubert (1890–1983), American artist and illustrator of children's books
- Mark Schubert, American swimming coach
- Max Schubert (1915–1994), Australian winemaker
- Michael Schubert (born 1967), East German weightlifter
- Misha Schubert (born 1973), Australian newspaper journalist
- Olaf Schubert, stage name of Michael Haubold (born 1967), German comedian and musician
- Pit Schubert (1935–2024), German author, climber and mountaineer
- Richard von Schubert (1850–1933), German army commander
- Samantha Schubert (1969–2016), Malaysian actress and model
- Steve Schubert (born 1951), American football player
- Sydney Schubert (1928–2015), Australian public servant
- Theodor von Schubert (1758–1825), German astronomer
- Thomas Schubert (born 1993), Austrian actor
- Wilhelm Schubert van Ehrenberg (1630/1637–c. 1676), Flemish painter

== See also ==
- Schubert (disambiguation)
