= Schubart (disambiguation) =

Schubart is a surname.

Schubart may also refer to:

- Schubart family, a collisional asteroid family
- 1911 Schubart, outer main-belt asteroid, named after the German astronomer Joachim Schubart (born 1928)

== See also ==
- Schubert (disambiguation)
- Shubert (disambiguation)
