= Schubert (disambiguation) =

Franz Schubert (1797–1828) was an Austrian composer.

Schubert may also refer to:

== People ==
=== Surname ===
- Schubert (surname), includes a list of notable people with the surname

=== Given name ===
- Schubert R. Dyche (1893–1982), American college sports coach and athletic director
- Schubert Gambetta (1920–1991), Uruguayan footballer player
- Schubert M. Ogden (1928–2019), American Protestant theologian

== Places ==
- Electoral district of Schubert, a state electoral district in South Australia
- Schubert, Missouri, an unincorporated community in Cole County, Missouri, U.S.
- Schubert, Pennsylvania, a census-designated place in Berks County, Pennsylvania, U.S.
- Schubert Inlet, in Antartica

=== Astronomical ===
- 3917 Franz Schubert, an asteroid in the asteroid belt
- Schubert (lunar crater), on the Moon
- Schubert (Mercurian crater), on the planet Mercury

== Other uses ==
- Schubert calculus, a branch of algebraic geometry
- Schubert Dip, a 1991 album by EMF
- Schubert Theatre (Gooding, Idaho), an American historical theater
- "Franz Schubert", a 1977 song by Kraftwerk from the album Trans-Europe Express

== See also ==
- Schubart (disambiguation)
- Shubert (disambiguation)
