= Lieberknecht =

Lieberknecht is a German compound surname, where Lieber is derived from the given name Liebert, and kneckt is an occupational surname for a journeyman, from the Middle Low German knecht, meaning "knight’s assistant" or "servant". Notable individuals with this surname include:

- Christine Lieberknecht (born 1958), German politician
- Torsten Lieberknecht (born 1973), German football player and manager

== See also ==
- Knecht
