= Gefreiter =

German military rank

Gefreiter ([ɡəˈfraɪ̯tɐ], abbr. Gefr.; plural Gefreite) is a military rank used in Germany, Switzerland, and Austria since the 16th century. It is typically the second rank or grade to which an enlisted soldier, airman, or sailor can be promoted.

The word has also been lent into the Russian language as yefreytor (Russian: ефрейтор) and is in use in several Russian and post-Soviet militaries.

== History ==
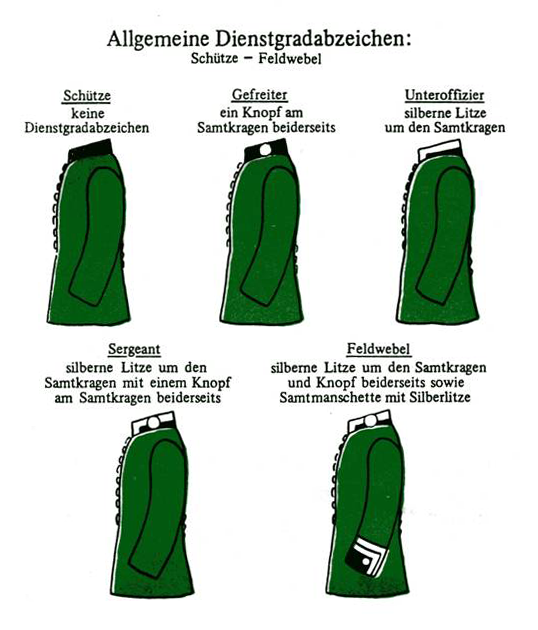
Illustration - Gefreiter uniform tunic rank insignia description of the 10th Hanoverian Jaeger Battalion (Hannoversches Jäger-Bataillon Nr. 10), Light Infantry, Royal Prussian Army.

Historically, the military rank of Gefreiter (female and plural form: Gefreite) emerged in 16th-century Europe for the German Landsknechte foot soldiers. These soldiers were predominantly composed of German and Swiss mercenary pikemen and supporting infantry foot soldiers. Soldiers who proved especially reliable and experienced were appointed to gefreyten Knechten (exempted/freed servants/soldiers, a cognate to 'knight'). They were positioned in critical battlefield roles and, along with their extra rank privileges, they were generally exempted from sentry duties.

From the 18th century, Gefreite were the frontline members of a military company, with every Gefreiter leading and commanding a section or squad of Gemeine (ordinary-rank soldiers). The rank existed in the cavalry, infantry, pioneers, and artillery, where Gefreiter rank held a higher rank-class status.

Gefreiter was the only enlisted rank within the Royal Prussian Army and the imperial army of the German Empire until 1918, to which an exceptional enlisted soldier could be promoted on the recommendation of the Hauptmann (Captain) or Rittmeister (Cavalry-Master), and ultimately endorsed by the Regiments-Commandeur (Regimental Colonel). An exception to this was the rank of Obergefreiter (since 1859) in the foot artillery, which later replaced the artillery Bombardier (Corporal) rank.

The Gefreiter rank was also considered a transition rank for promotion to and from which replacements were selected to the Unteroffizier (Corporal) rank. Within the Royal Prussian Army and the imperial army of the German Empire, the rank Gefreiter served as a deputy to the Unteroffizier (Corporal) and was distinguished by the wearing of an Auszeichnungsknopf (rank distinction button) known as the Gefreitenknopf (Gefreiter button) on each side of their uniform collar, similar to the slightly larger rank collar side-buttons worn by both the Sergeant and Feldwebel ranks.

In the Royal Prussian Army until its reorganization after 1806, there existed, along with the rank of Gefreiter, the rank of Gefreite-Korporale, who wore a silver Portepee (sword lanyard). These officer cadets were specifically selected for higher advancement and stood equal with their officer cadet counterpart, the Portepee-Fähnriche. The rank of Gefreite-Korporale also existed alongside Gefreiter in the Austrian Army during the Thirty Years' War.

Since the 1920s, the German rank of Gefreiter has expanded into several additional ranks and duties:

- Obergefreiter (Senior Lance Corporal, otherwise Second Corporal in the Prussian Army since 1859)
- Hauptgefreiter (Leading Lance Corporal in the Luftwaffe from 1935 to 1944, the Kriegsmarine from 1938 to 1945, and the Heer from 1955)
- Stabsgefreiter (Staff Lance Corporal in the Reichswehr since 1927, the Kriegsmarine until 1945, and the Luftwaffe from 1944, temporarily replacing the Hauptgefreiter rank)
- Oberstabsgefreiter (Senior Staff Lance Corporal in the Kriegsmarine since 1940, not in the Heer or Luftwaffe until 1996)

All Gefreiter ranks are currently in use with the German army, air force, and navy.

The female form, Gefreite, is not used by the military; the formal address is Frau Gefreiter.

== Austria ==
Gefreiter
- Cap insignia

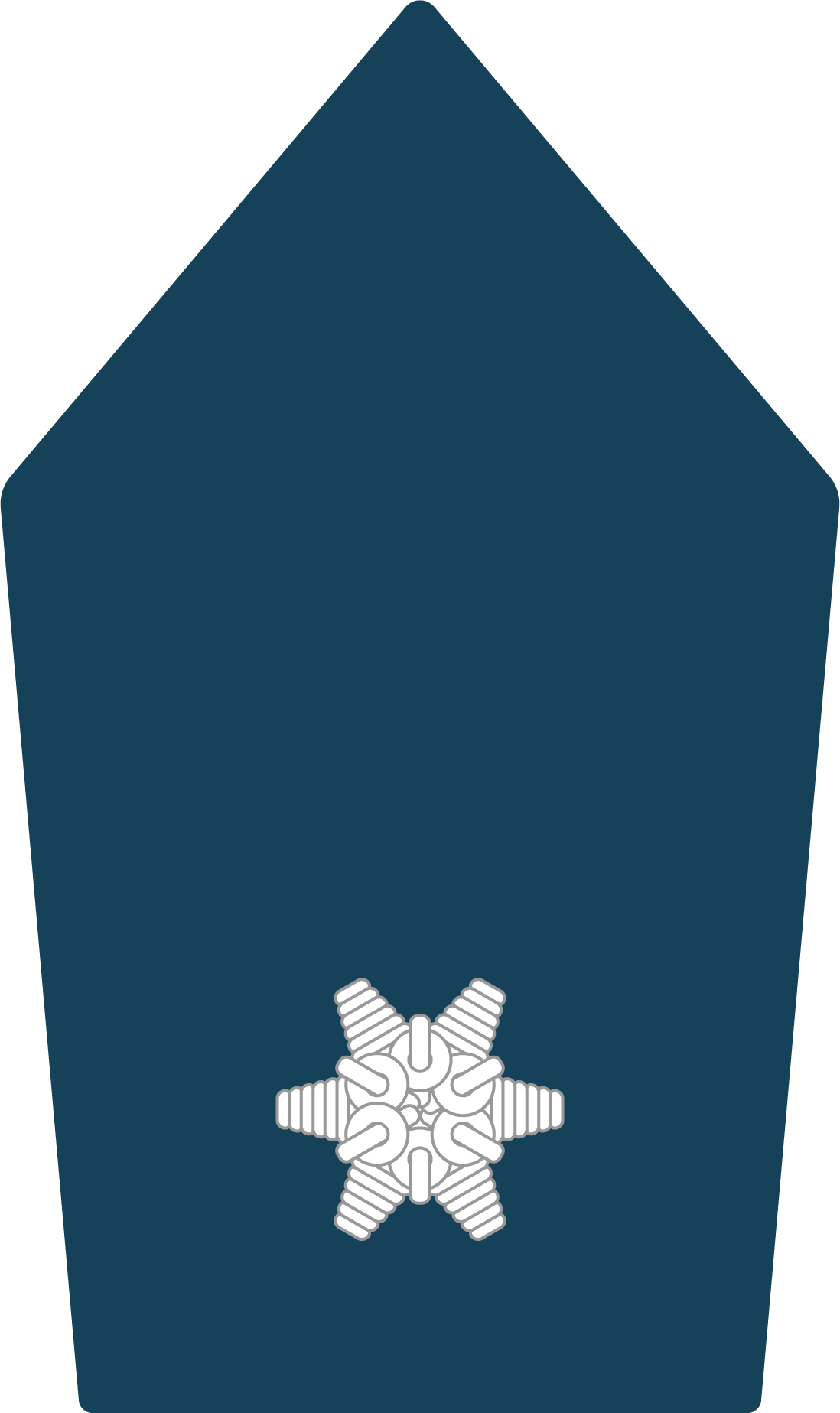
- Service and field insignia
- Abbreviation: Gfr
- Rank group: Charges
- Non-NATO rank: OR-2
- Formation: 1857
- Next higher rank: Korporal
- Next lower rank: Rekrut

Gefreiter (abbr. Gfr) is a military rank of the Austrian Bundesheer. It is officially translated as lance corporal.

=== Austro-Hungarian Army ===
In the Austro-Hungarian Army (1867–1918), Gefreiter (Hungarian: Őrvezetö) corresponded to Patrouilleführer and Vormeister. It was used by the Kaiserjäger as well as the Feldjäger, Standschützen troops, cavalry, medical corps, and infantry.

Then rank insignia was a single white celluloid star on the stand-up collar of the so-called Waffenrock (tunic) on gorget patch (German: Paroli). The stand-up collar and background of the gorget patch displayed a particular egalisation colour.

Junior rank Soldat (Honvéd)	Rank insignias of the Austro-Hungarian armed forces Gefreiter; Patrouilleführer; Vormeister	Senior rank Korporal

Rank insignia
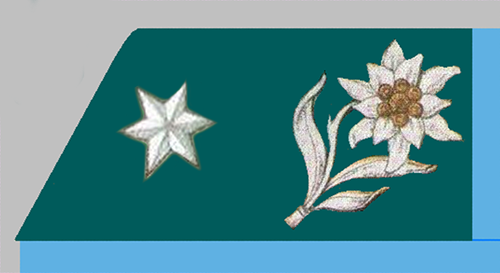
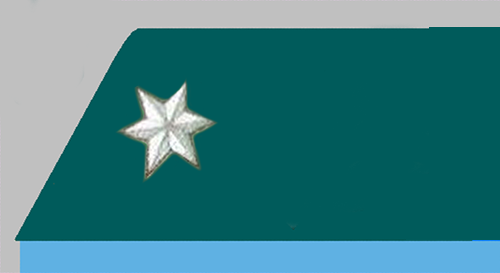
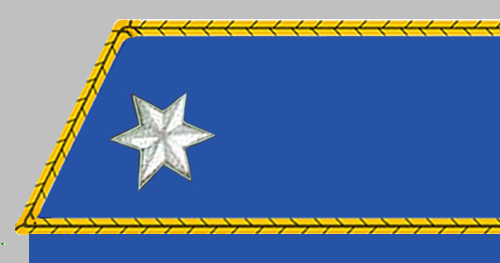
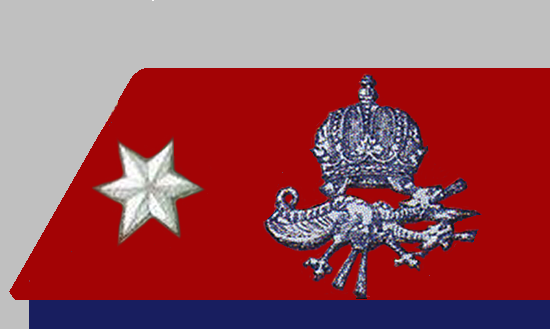
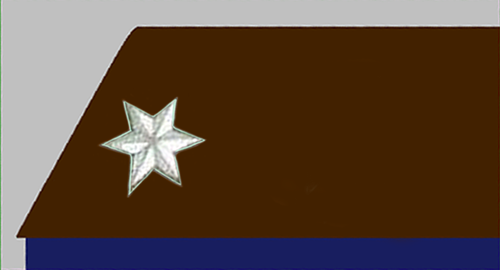
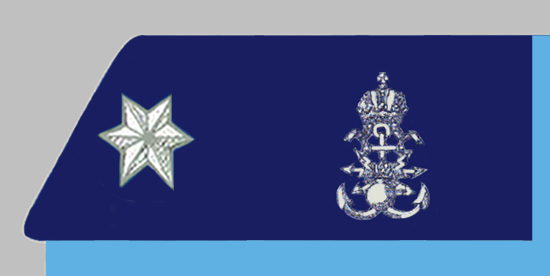
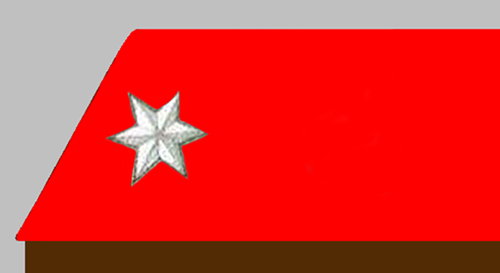
Desigahntion	Austrian Imperial and Royal (k. u. k.) Army enlisted ranks
insignia
description	Patrouilleführer			Gefreiter			Vormeister
	k. u. k. Mountain troops	k. u. k. Rifles		Machine-gun units	Infantry; IR 7
branch	Rifles		Cavalry	Infantry		Military engineering	Artillery

Gefreiter in the context of infantry

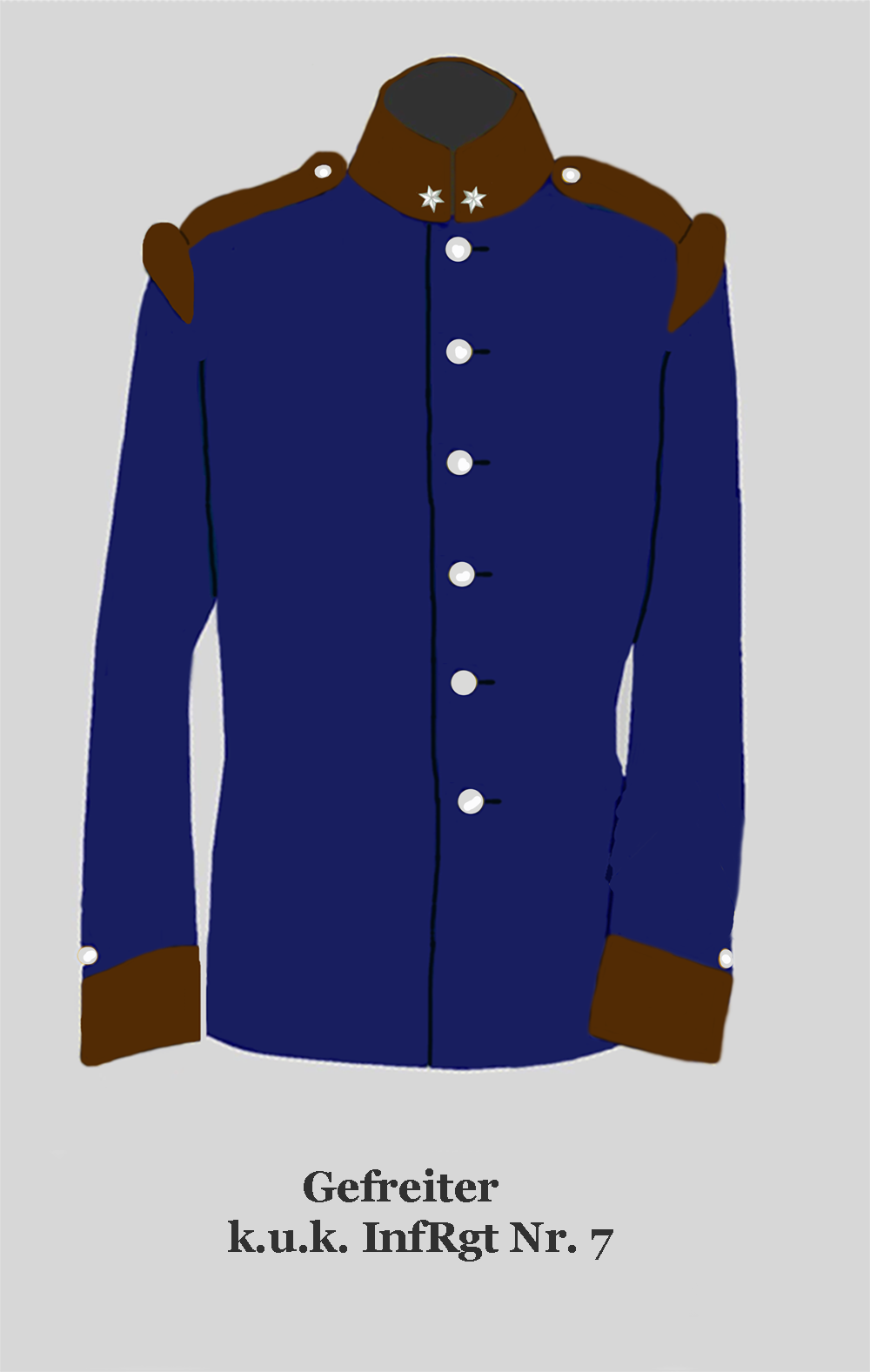
IR 7

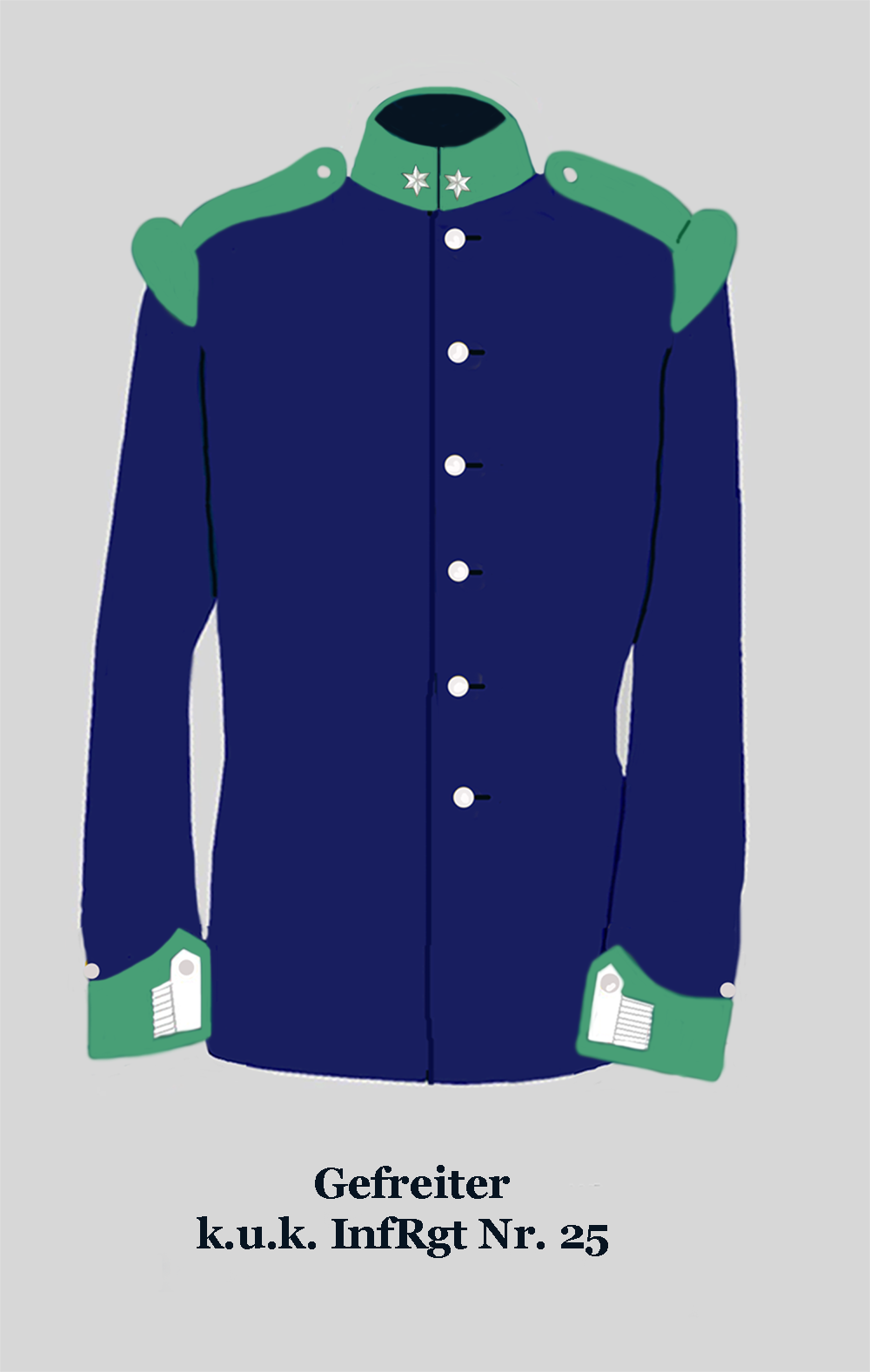
IR 25

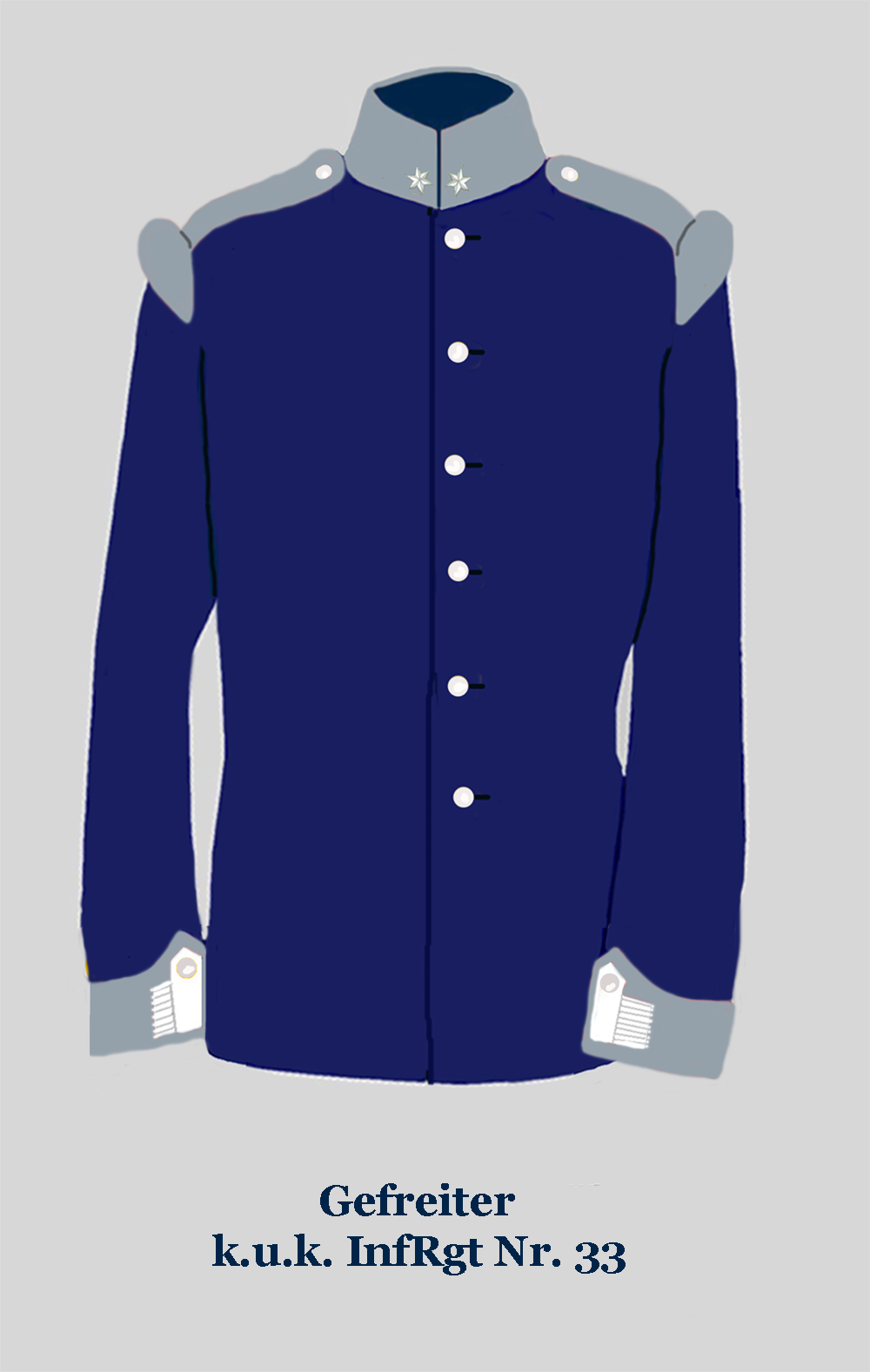
IR 33

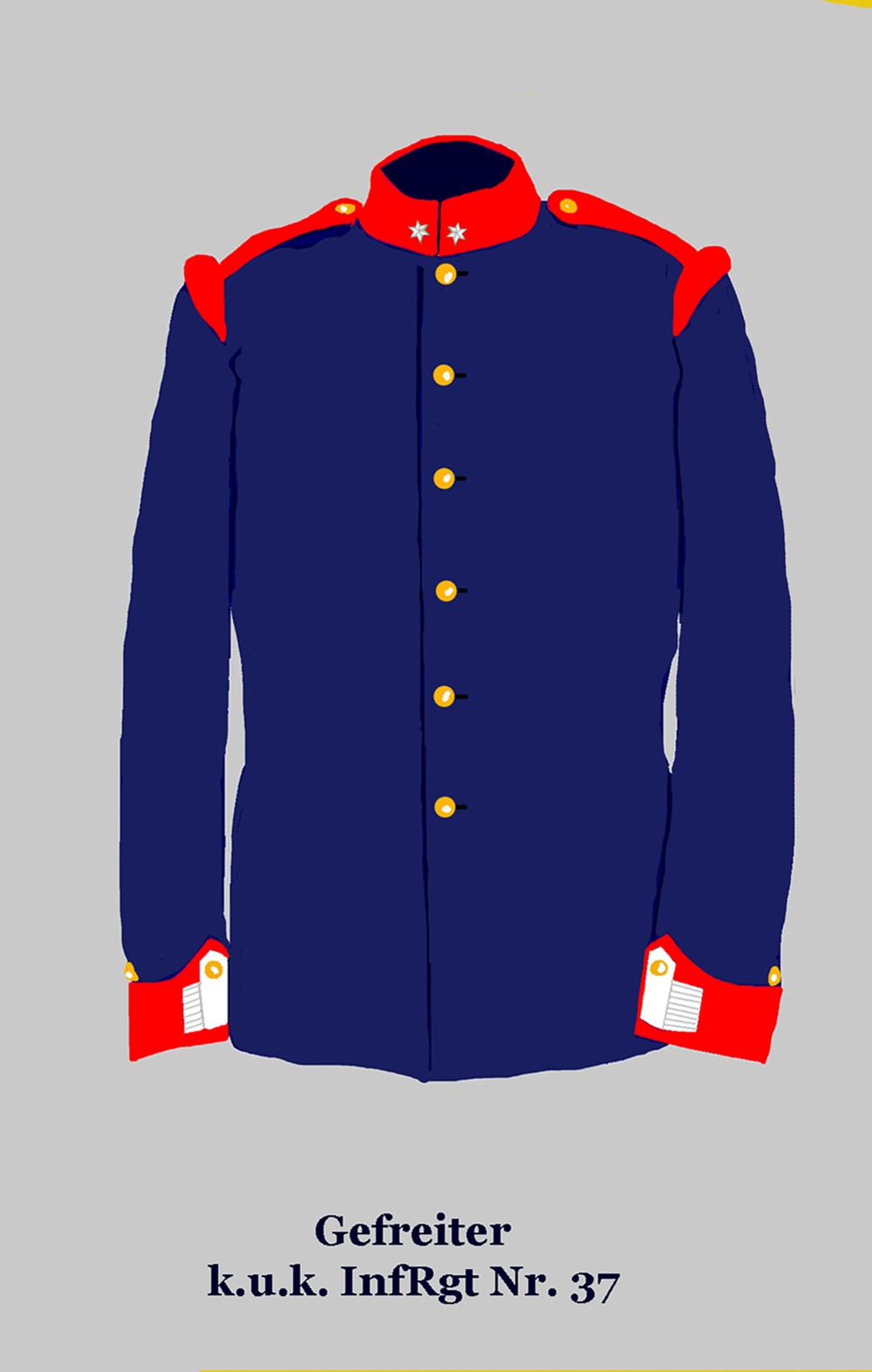
IR 37

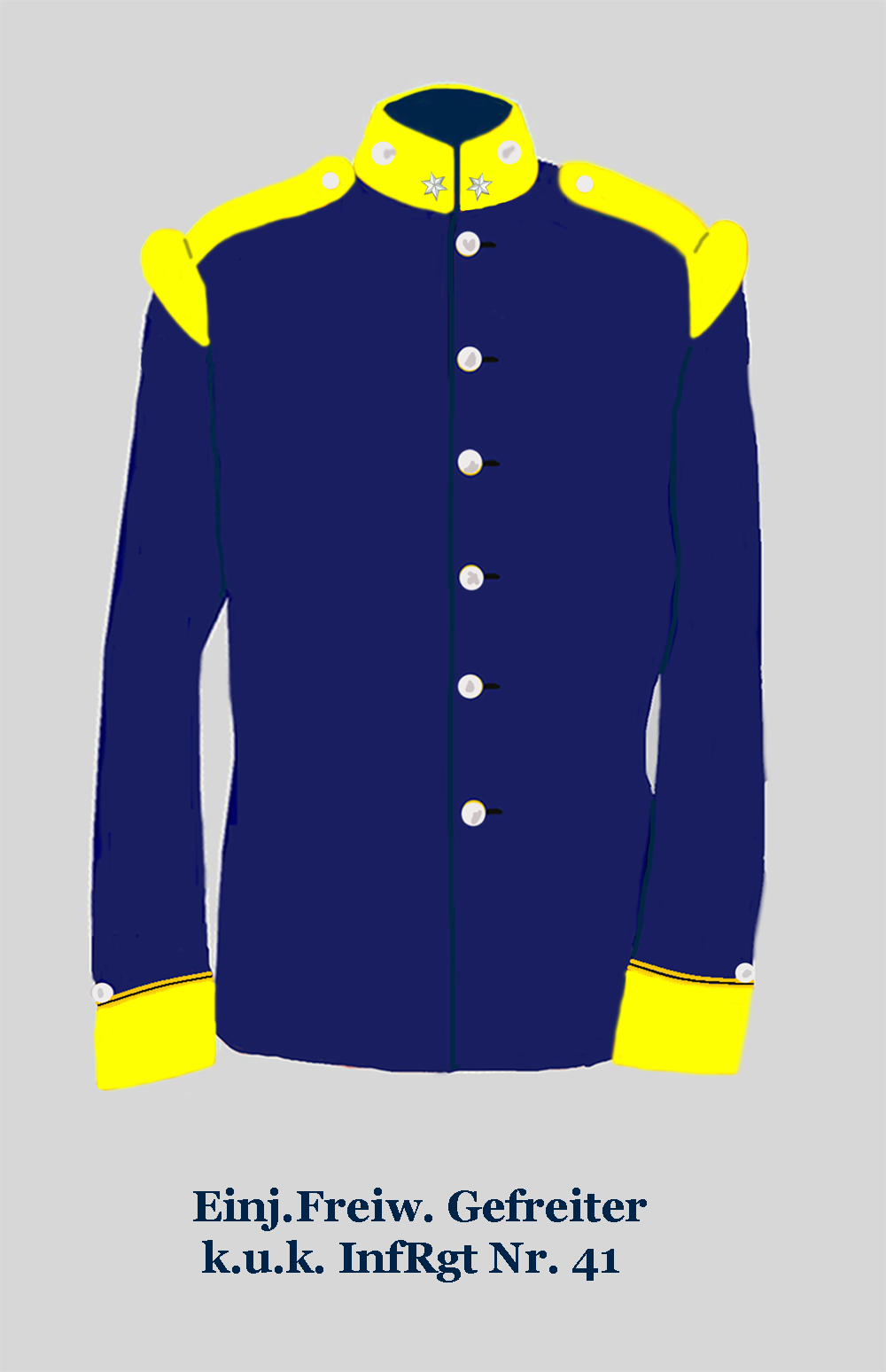
IR 41

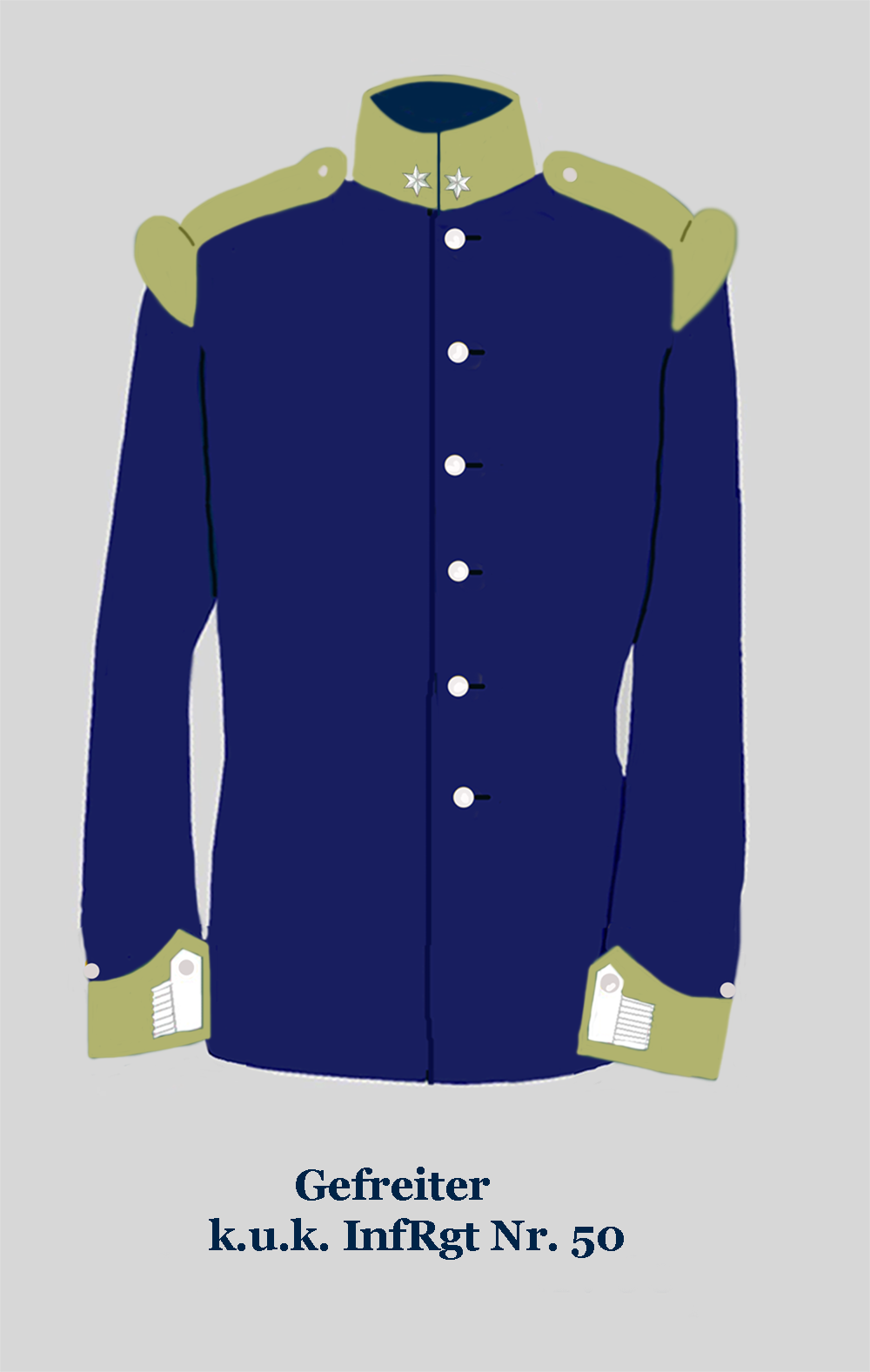
IR 50

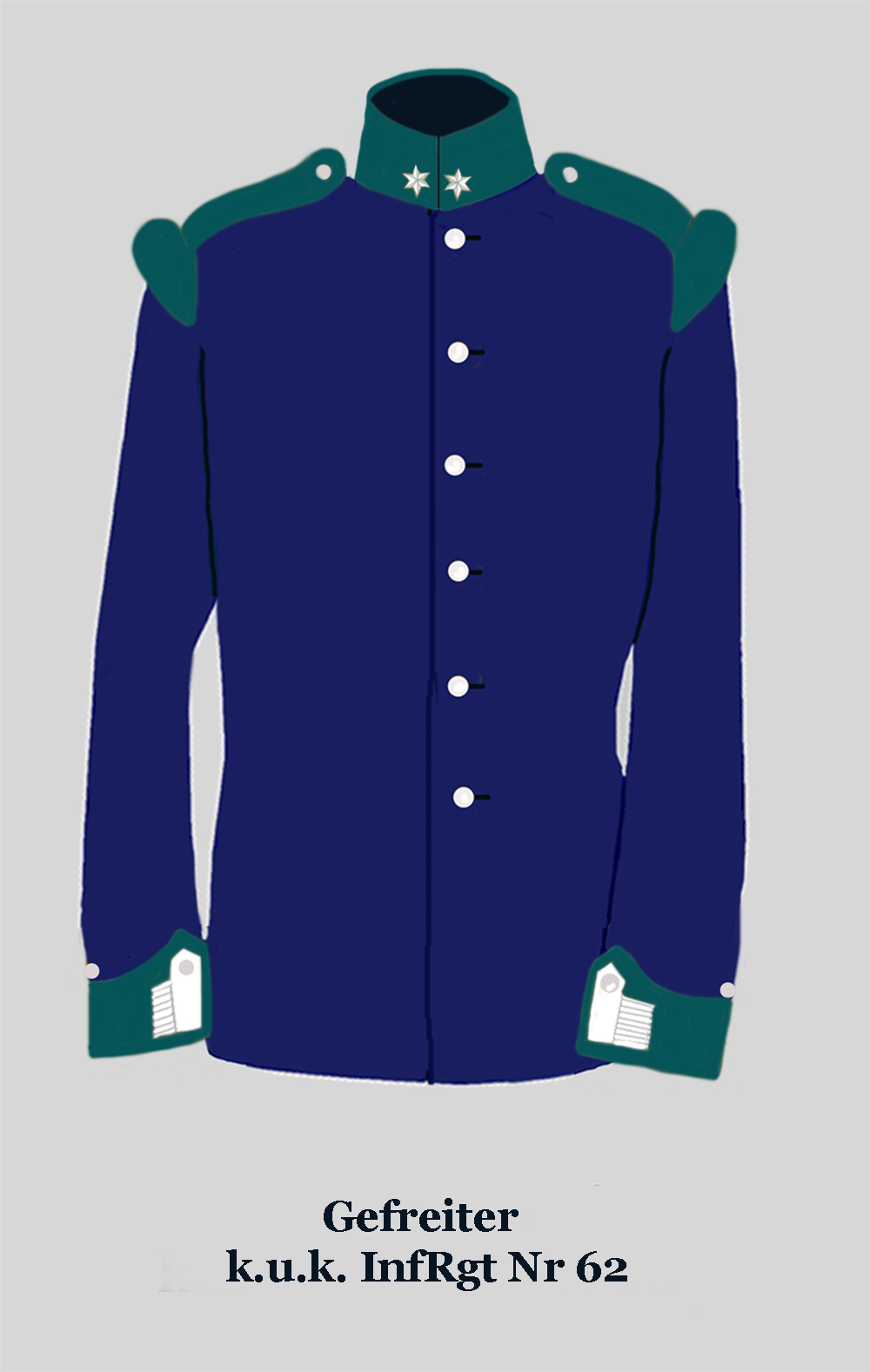
IR 62

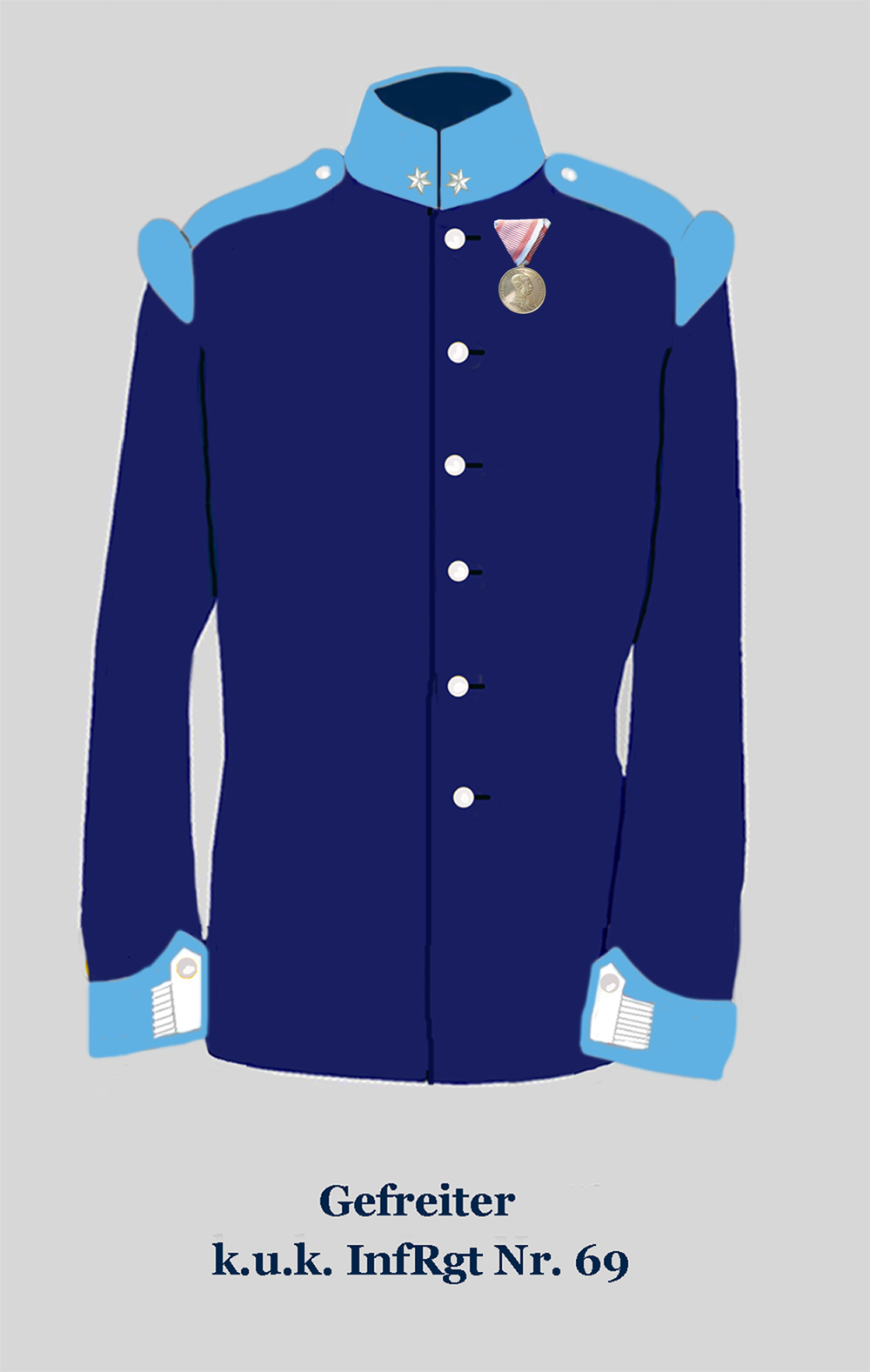
IR 69

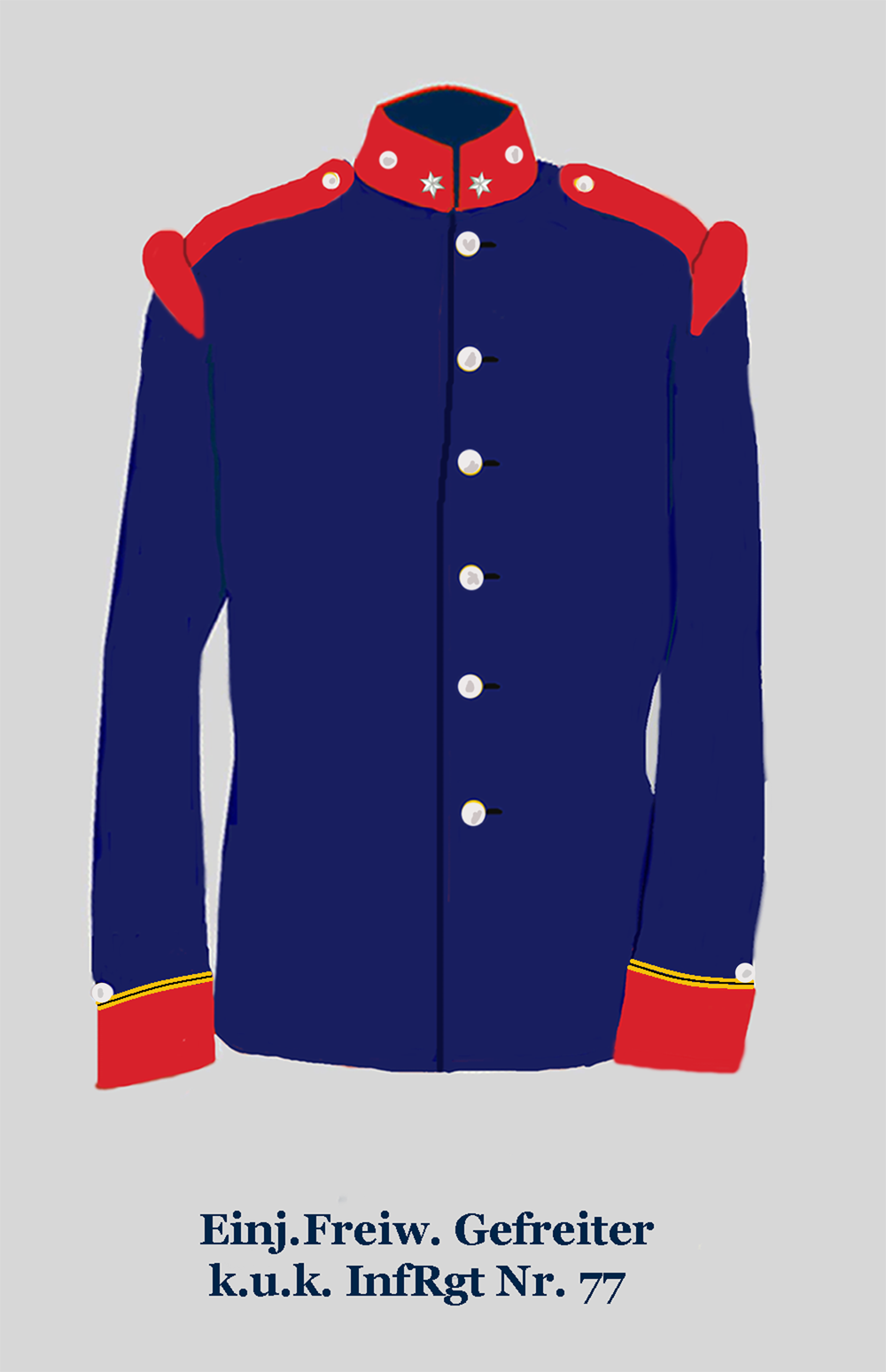
IR 77

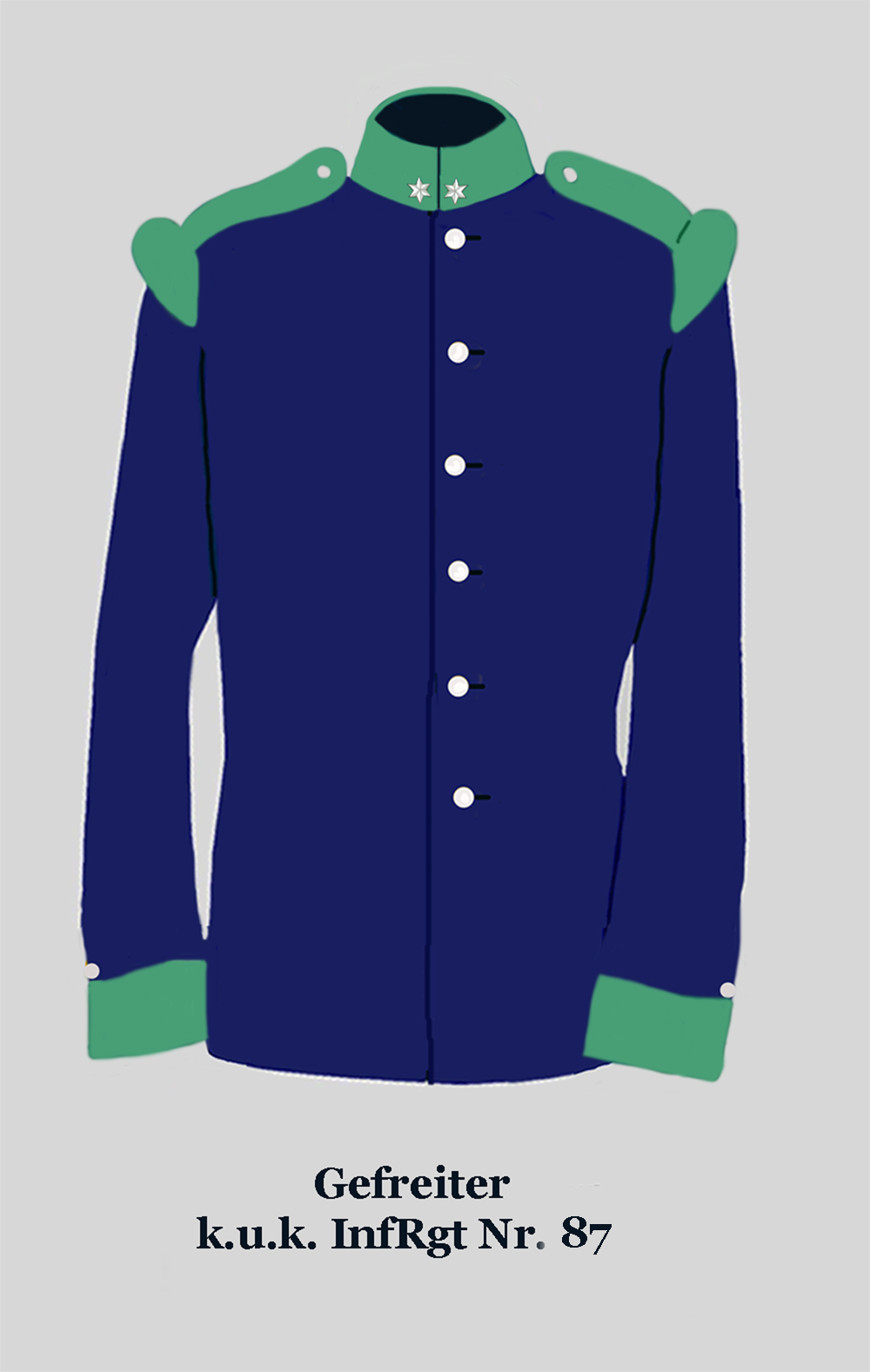
IR 87

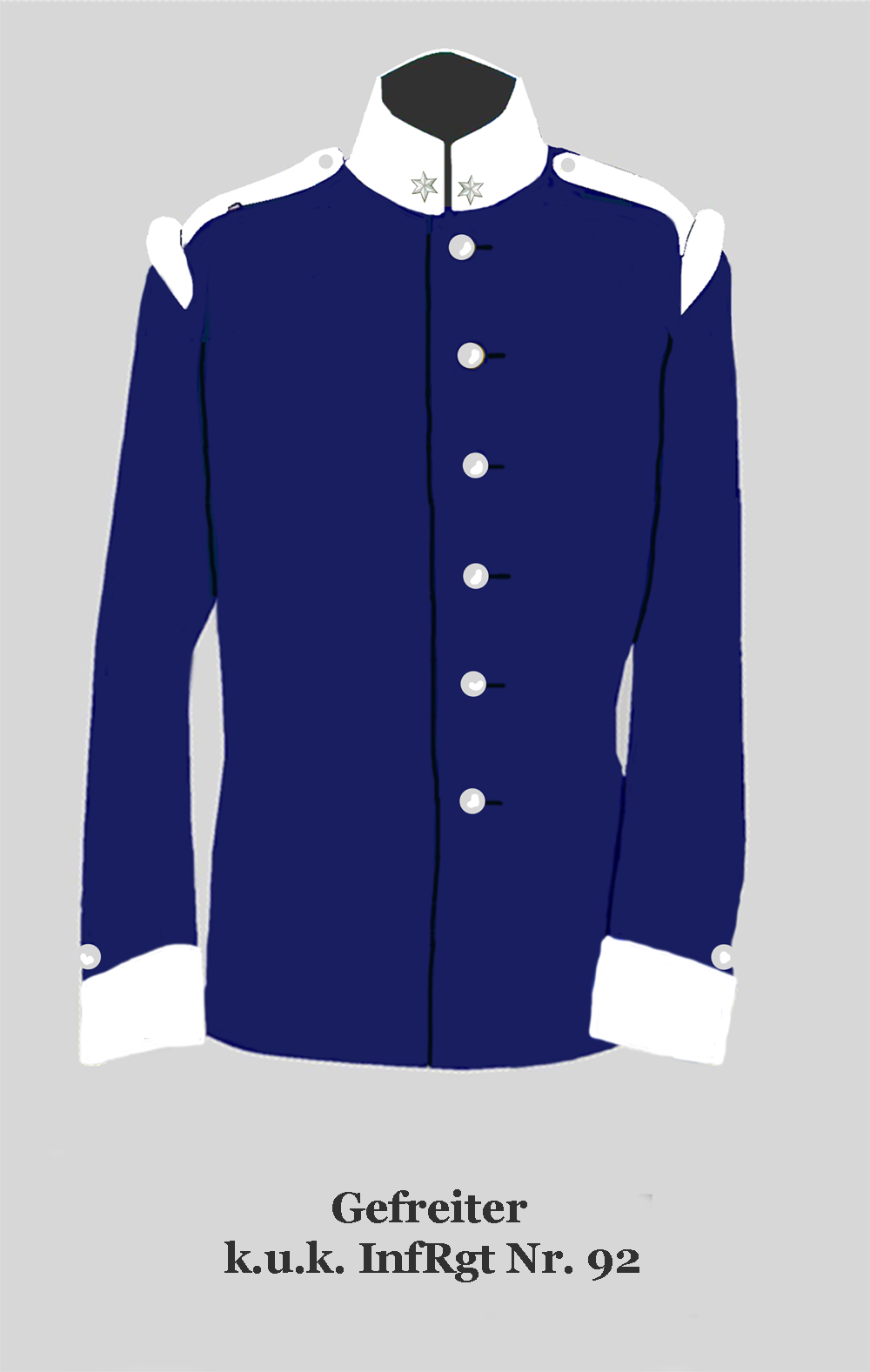
IR 92

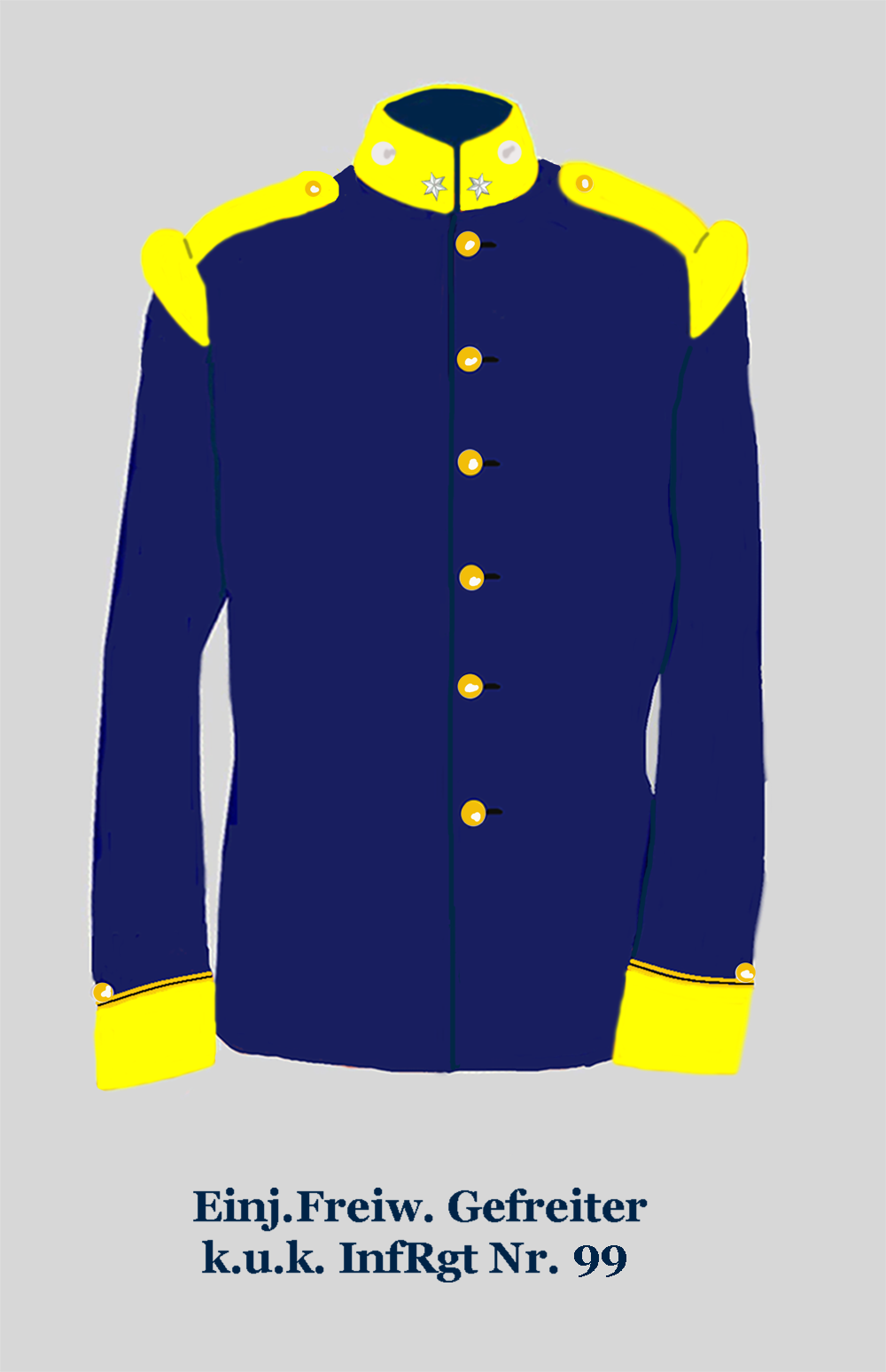
IR 99

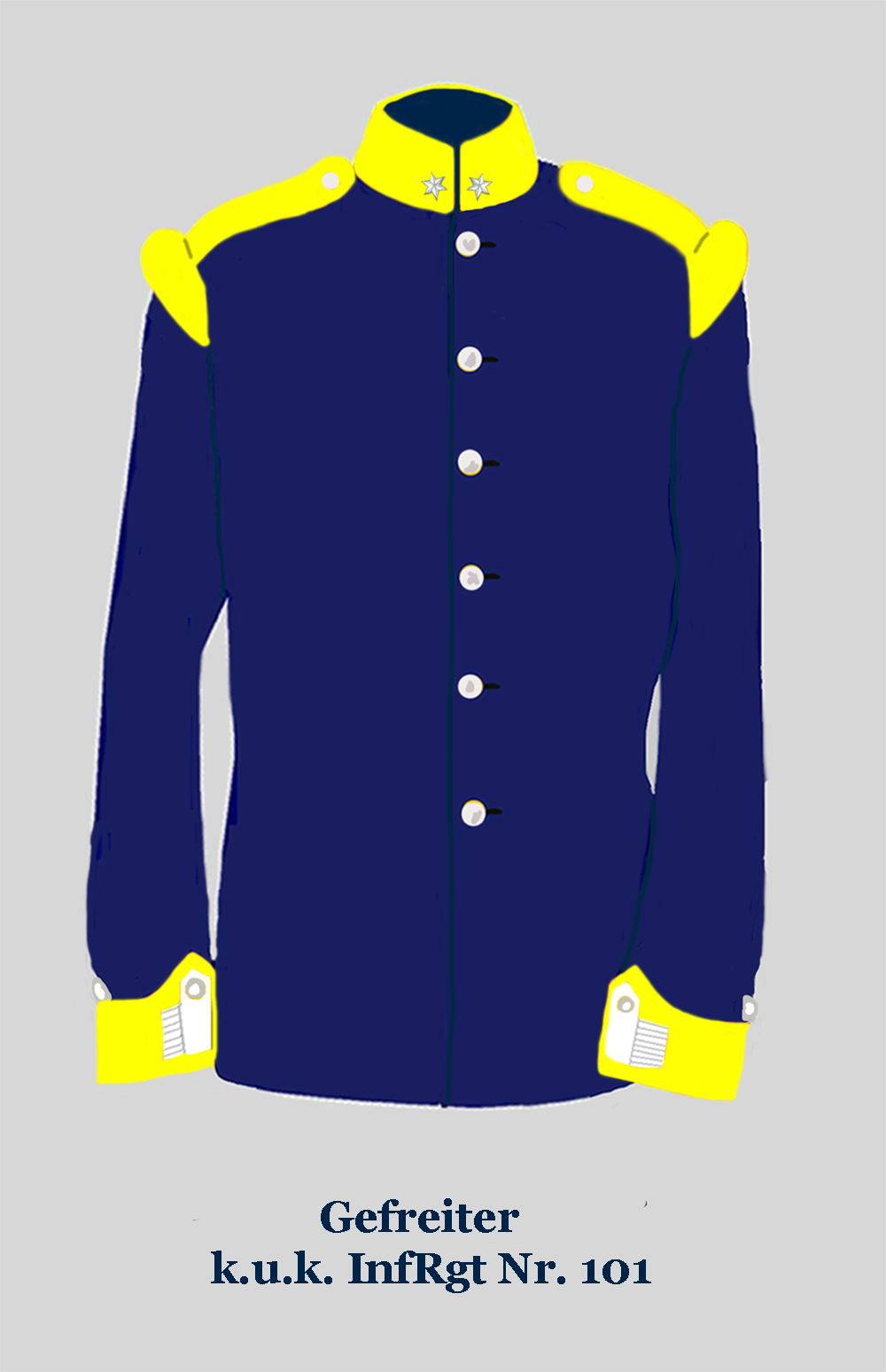
IR 101

== Germany ==
=== Bundeswehr ===
Gefreiter
- Heer shoulder and Marine sleeve insignia
- Country: Germany
- Service branch: German Army; German Navy; German Air Force
- Abbreviation: Gefr.
- Rank: German enlisted rank
- NATO rank code: OR-2
- Formation: 1955
- Next higher rank: Obergefreiter
- Next lower rank: Soldat/Schütze; Matrose

Gefreiter (abbr. Gefr. or G.) is the second enlisted rank grade within the modern-day Army (Heer), Air Force (Luftwaffe), and Navy (Marine) of the Bundeswehr. Following the NATO ranking system, Gefreiter equates to OR-2 on the NATO-standard rank scale, making the rank equivalent to either private, private first class, vice corporal, lance corporal, or corporal, depending on the chosen NATO-allied force used for the comparison. It is grade A4 in the pay scale of the Federal Ministry of Defence.

The sequence of ranks (top-down approach) in this particular group is as follows:

- OR-4: Oberstabsgefreiter
- OR-4: Stabsgefreiter
- OR-3: Hauptgefreiter
- OR-3: Obergefreiter
- OR-2: Gefreiter
- OR-1: Soldat/Schütze (Army), Flieger (Air Force), Matrose (Navy)

In line with Bundeswehr rank advancement conditions, enlisted personnel at the OR-1 level may be promoted to the OR-2 level after passing primary recruit training (usually after three months) to the rank of Gefreiter.

Junior rank Soldat	(German enlisted rank); Gefreiter	Senior rank Obergefreiter

=== Wehrmacht 1935–1945 ===
Illustration of former German Army (Heer) Gefreiter rank insignia, worn on the upper left arm sleeve. The backing is made of blue-green cloth (Version from 1 October 1936 to 1945, previously two chevrons in the Reichswehr).

Throughout the periods of the Royal Prussian Army, the Imperial Army of the German Empire, the Reichswehr, the Wehrmacht, and the Waffen-SS, the rank of Gefreiter was considered equivalent to that of a lance corporal.

The Obergefreiter was regarded as senior lance corporal or rather second corporal in the artillery, and the full corporal rank known as Unteroffizier (subordinate non-commissioned officer) replaced the Korporal rank from 1856.

Within the army branch (Heer) of the Wehrmacht, a rank of Oberschütze (senior rifleman) once existed between the ranks of Gefreiter and Schütze/Soldat ("[enlisted] ordinary-rank rifleman/soldier").

A Gefreiter was considered an "exempted man", who was not typically assigned more menial duties, such as guard detail. A soldier promoted to Gefreiter was seen as showing some promise of leadership capability, while those who did not were promoted to Oberschütze.

Since the unmasking of the Luftwaffe on 1 March 1935, the Gefreiter was also part of their ranks. Prior to this, the Luftwaffe operated secretly under the guise of the German Air Sports Association (DLV). The Gefreiter emerged from the Flieger-Gefreiter (Airman Lance Corporal) of the DLV flying corps, where this rank served as an assistant aircraft pilot (DLV-Hilfsflugzeugführer), assistant radio operator (DLV-Hilfsbordfunker), or assistant supervisor (DLV-Unterwart).

In addition to wearing the chevron on the left upper arm, the Luftwaffe Gefreiter had collar tabs showing two aluminium wings. In this illustration, the red colour on the Luftwaffe Gefreiter collar tabs identifies the branch as the Flak Corps.

The Luftwaffe Gefreiter ranked immediately above the lowest rank, Flieger (Airman, Aviator); there was no equivalent to the army rank of Oberschütze. Instead of the rank insignia of its DLV counterpart, which was three aluminum-colored wings on both collar patches, the Luftwaffe Gefreiter wore only two collar wings. The collar patches were in one of the respective Luftwaffe branch colours. Additionally, the Gefreiter wore a chevron on the left upper arm according to the army pattern, but on a base made of blue-grey fabric. The chevrons were made of aluminium-coloured braid (for service tunic, flight blouse, coat), grey-blue braid (for drill blouse, work protection suit), or dark brown braid (for tropical shirt).

Final ranks to enlisted men until 1945
Waffen-SS	Heer (Army)	Luftwaffe (Air Force)	Kriegsmarine (Navy)
SS-Schütze	Schütze	Flieger	Matrose
SS-Oberschütze	Oberschütze	Flieger	Matrose
SS-Sturmmann	Gefreiter		Matrosengefreiter
SS-Rottenführer	Obergefreiter		Matrosenobergefreiter
No equivalent		Hauptgefreiter	Matrosenhauptgefreiter
No equivalent	Stabsgefreiter		Matrosenstabsgefreiter
No equivalent			Matrosenoberstabsgefreiter

==== "Bohemian corporal" ====
The best-known holder of the rank of Gefreiter was Adolf Hitler, who held the rank in the Bavarian Reserve Infantry Regiment 16 of the Royal Bavarian Army during World War I.

"Bohemian corporal" was a derogatory term used privately in World War II for Adolf Hitler by German generals (many of whom were Prussian aristocrats) dissatisfied with Hitler's military leadership and detailed control. Among the generals were Gerd von Rundstedt, Erich von Manstein, and Friedrich Paulus.

Wilhelm Keitel once asked Hitler, "Do you realise that Rundstedt called you a Bohemian corporal?" Hitler replied, "Yes, but he is the best field marshal I have".

Von Rundstedt used the term dieser böhmische Gefreite, which Hitler had acquired in the 1930s from World War I hero, German President Paul von Hindenburg. Hindenburg, who took an instant mutual dislike to Hitler on their first meeting, mistook Hitler's hometown of Braunau in Austria (Braunau am Inn) for another town of the same name (Broumov, German: Braunau) in Bohemia. Initially, he said "Austrian corporal", but later used "Bohemian corporal", which was a pejorative term, as he regarded Bohemians as "essentially gypsies", unlike the more cultured Prussians or even Austrians.

== Russia ==
Yefreytor
- Army and Air Force shoulder insignia
- Country: Russia
- Service branch: Russian Ground Forces; Russian Air Force
- Rank: Table of ranks
- Formation: 1716 in the Imperial Russian Army
- Next higher rank: Mladshy serzhant
- Next lower rank: Ryadovoy

Yefreytor (Russian: ефрейтор) is a German loanword in Russian and denotes a similar rank in the Russian army.

In Russia, the rank of yefreytor was introduced by Peter I in 1716 to the infantry, cavalry, and engineer forces. The rank was not used after 1722. During the reign of Paul I, it was made an equivalent rank to private which, after the reign of Alexander I, was used only for the Imperial Guard. Yefreytor was re-introduced in the course of the military reforms of 1826.

In the armed forces of the Soviet Union (and later the Russian Federation), yefreytor is the highest rank of enlisted personnel. According to NATO-rank system, the rank might be comparable to OR-4 in Anglophone armed forces.

Sequence of ranks
junior rank: Ryadovoy	Yefreytor	senior rank: Junior sergeant

=== Rank insignia ===
==== Imperial Russian Army ====
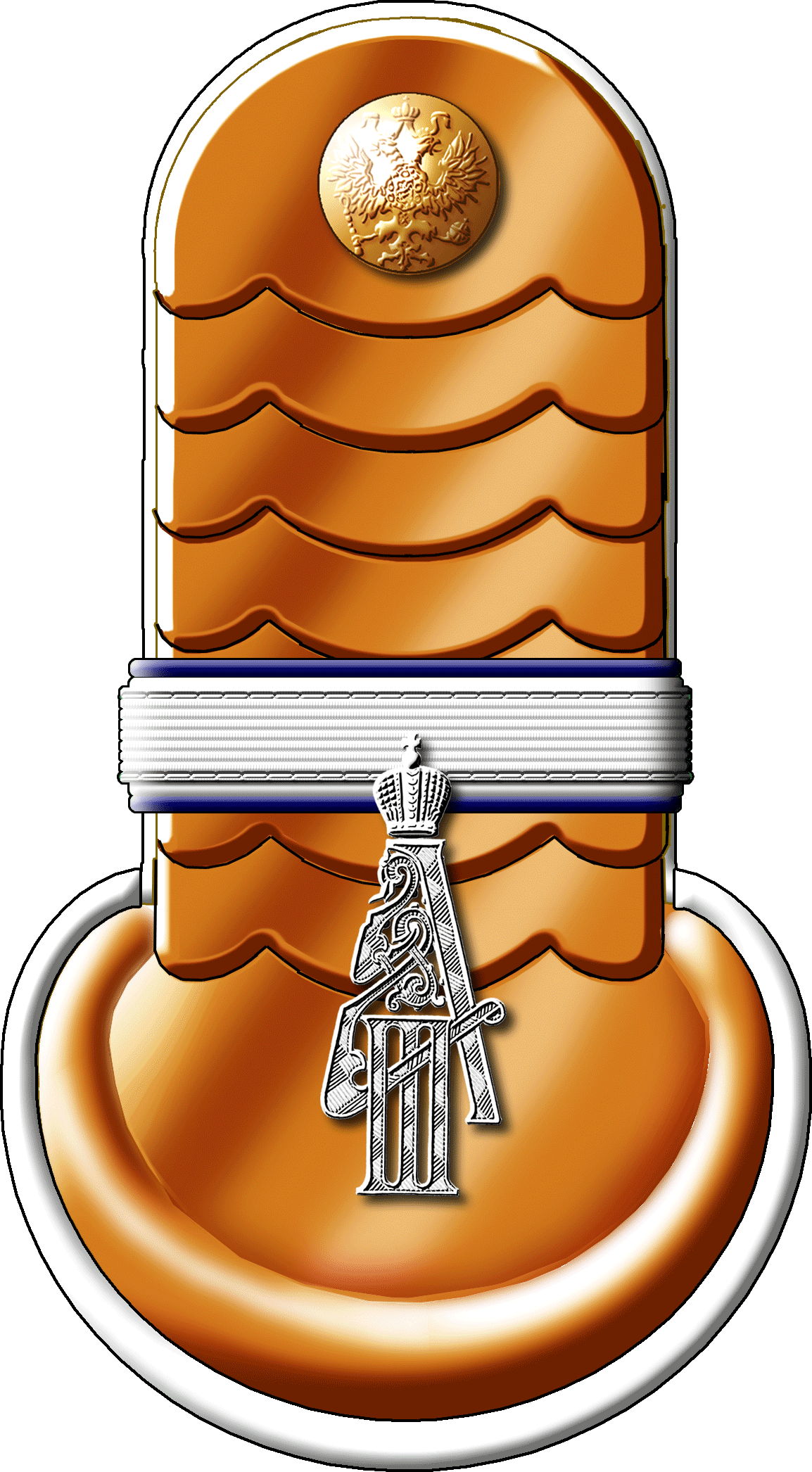
Epaulette Yefreytor of the 3rd Lancer Smolensk Emperor Alexander III Regiment
(1908)

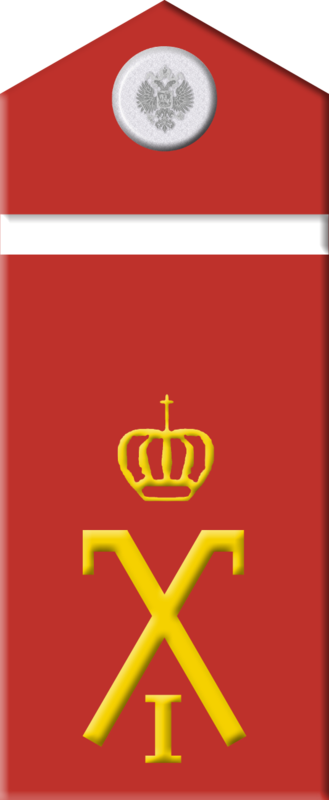
Shoulder insignia Yefreytor to Imperial Russian Army
(until 1917)

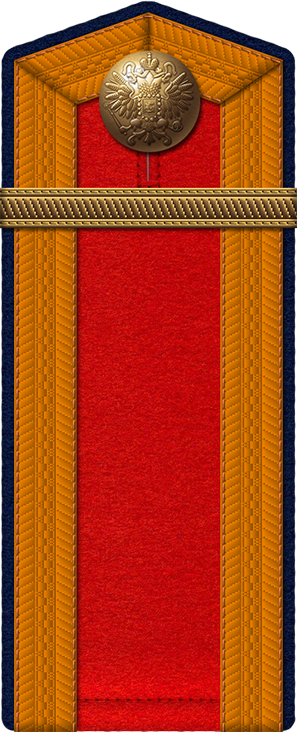
Pogon Yefreytor (lance corporal) of the Russian Life Guards Uhlan Regiment
(1914)

==== Red Army (RA) and Soviet Armed Forces (SA) ====
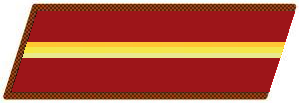
Gorget insignia to gymnastyorka yefreytor RA (1940−1943)

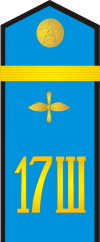
Shoulder board yefreytor
Air Force
RA (1943−1955) and SA (1946-1955)

Yefreytor
infantry SA

Yefreytor Air Force, aviation Air defence and Navy, Airborne troops SA
(1955−1963)

==== Russian Armed Forces ====
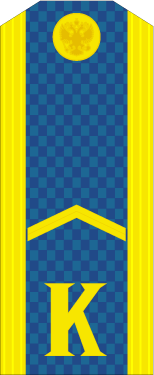
Kursant Service uniform with OR-3 rank yefreytor of the Air Force or Airborne Troops
(1994–2010)

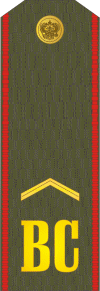
Service uniform yefreytor
of the Army and SMF
(1994−2010)

Field uniform yefreytor of the whole Armed Forces branches
(1994—2010)

Service uniform yefreytor of the Army
(2010−present)

Service uniform yefreytor of the Air Force
(2010−present)

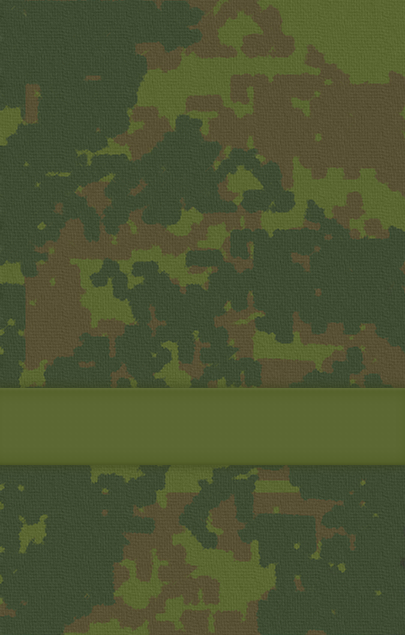
Field uniform yefreytor of the whole Armed Forces branches
(2010—present)

==== Other uses of Yefreytor ====
ԵՖՐԵՅՏՈՐ
Yefreytor
(Armenian Ground Forces)

Яфрэйтар
Jafrejtar
(Belarusian Ground Forces)

Ефрейтор
Efreytor
(Bulgarian Land Forces)

Ефрейтор
Efreĭtor
(Kazakh Ground Forces)

Ефрейтор
Efreytor
(Kyrgyz Army)

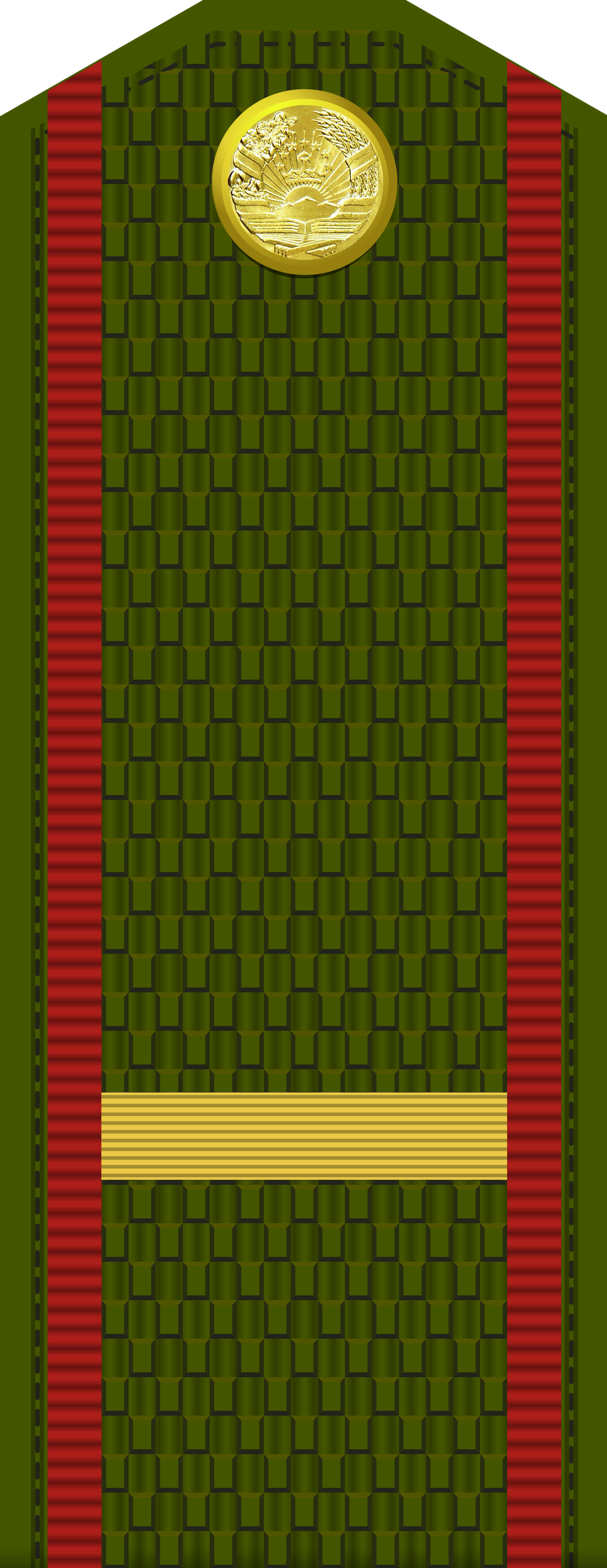
Ефрейтор
Efreytor
(Tajik Ground Forces)

== See also ==
- Military ranks of the German Empire
- World War II German Army ranks and insignia
- Rank insignia of the German armed forces
- Ranks and insignia of NATO armies enlisted
- History of Russian military ranks
