= Shubert Theatre =

Shubert Theatre or Shubert Theater may refer to one of the following theaters in the United States:

Listed alphabetically by state

- Shubert Theatre (Los Angeles) (1972–2002), California
- Shubert Theatre (New Haven) (built 1914), Connecticut
- Shubert Theatre, former name of CIBC Theatre in Chicago, Illinois
- Shubert's Central Theatre (demolished 1970), onetime name of Steinway Hall in Chicago, Illinois
- Shubert Theatre, former name of Civic Theatre in New Orleans, Louisiana
- Shubert Theatre (Boston) (built 1908), part of the Boch Center in Massachusetts
- Shubert-Lafayette Theatre (1925–1964), run by The Shubert Organization in Detroit, Michigan
- Shubert Theatre, former name of the Goodale Theater; part of the Cowles Center for Dance and the Performing Arts in Minneapolis, Minnesota
- Shubert Theatre (opened 1910), former name of the Fitzgerald Theater in St. Paul, Minnesota
- Shubert's Missouri Theater (opened 1900), also known by other names including Folly Theater, in Kansas City, Missouri
- Shubert Theatre (Broadway) (built 1913), Manhattan, New York
- Shubert Theatre (demolished 1976), run by The Shubert Organization in Cincinnati, Ohio
- Shubert Theatre (Philadelphia) (opened 1918), renamed the Miller Theater, in Pennsylvania
- Shubert Theatre (Milwaukee)

== See also ==
- Little Shubert Theatre, an off-Broadway theatre in New York City now known as Stage 42
- Shubert Alley, located in New York City adjacent to Broadway's Shubert Theatre
- Schubert Theatre (Gooding, Idaho), listed on the National Register of Historic Places
- **
