= Mademoiselle Ambroisine =

French actress and ballet dancer

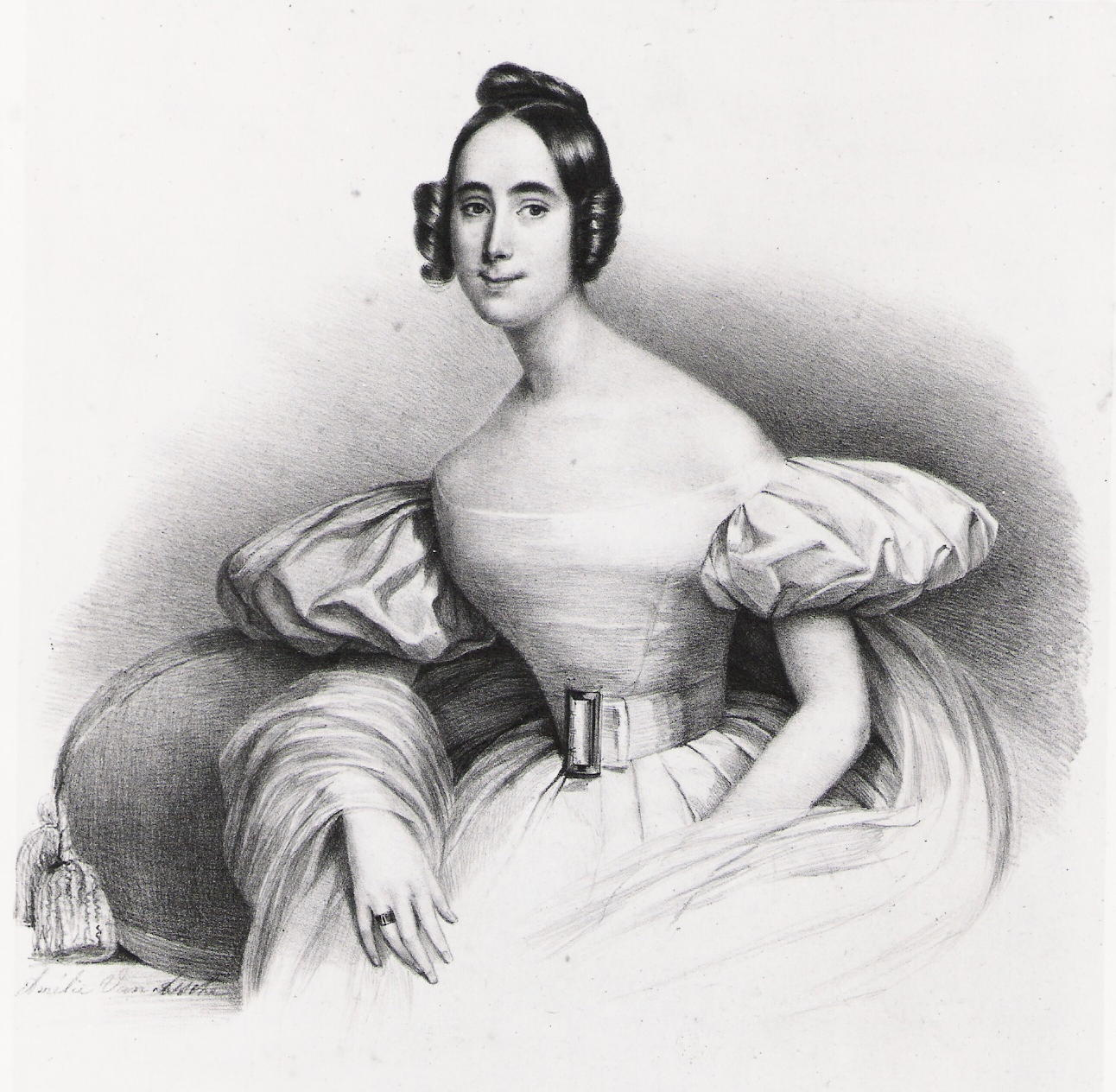
Mademoiselle Ambroisine (around 1835)

Françoise-Ambroise Acolet (born in Paris 21 January 1811; dead in Saulieu (Côte-d'Or) 1 March 1882), called Mademoiselle Ambroisine, was a French actress and ballet dancer. She was considered the leading lady of romantic ballet in Brussels during the 1832 to 1836.

Ambroisine's career on the stage began at the Théâtre de l'Ambigu-Comique in Paris where she acted, playing children, from the age of eight. From the age of ten she attended the dance school at the Théâtre de la Porte Saint-Martin, whose ballet productions were considered superior to those of the Opéra National de Paris at that time.

She advanced from minor roles to premiere danseuse at the ballet in Lyon in 1830. There she met tenor Claude Sirand, whom she was to marry on 5 February 1836, in Brussels. Her first appearance in Brussels was on 14 October 1832 at La Monnaie. By this time she was premiere danseuse at the Académie royale de Musique de Paris, as the Opéra National de Paris was then called.

Her roles in ballets choreographed by Victor Bartholomin and Jean-Antoine Petipa met with critical acclaim. Her duet with Pepita's son Lucien in The Caliph of Baghdad was highly regarded, as were her performances in Robert the Devil and Xaïla.

She gave up dancing for some months in 1836, following her marriage. With her husband she returned to Lyon later in 1836 and resumed her career there until 1841. The details of her life thereafter, and the date and place of her death, are unknown.

== Bibliography ==
- (in French) J-P Van Aelbrouck, "ACOLET, Françoise-Ambroise, dite Mlle AMBROISINE", in E. Gubin, C. Jacques, V. Piette & J. Puissant (eds), Dictionnaire des femmes belges: XIX^{e} et XX^{e} siècles. Bruxelles: Éditions Racine, 2006. ISBN 2-87386-434-6
