= Wagenknecht =

Wagenknecht is a German surname, where 'Wagen' means a 'horse-drawn vehicle', 'Knecht' a servant. Notable people with the surname include:

- Addie Wagenknecht (born 1981), American artist
- Alfred Wagenknecht (1881–1956), German-American Communist
- Detlef Wagenknecht (born 1959), German middle-distance runner
- Edward Wagenknecht (1900–2004), American literary critic
- Lukáš Wagenknecht (born 1978), Czech economist
- Max Wagenknecht (1857–1922), German composer
- Sahra Wagenknecht (born 1969), German politician
