= Joseph Schubert =

Joseph Schubert may refer to:

- Joseph Schubert (composer) (1754–1837), German composer, violinist and violist
- Joseph C. Schubert (1871–1959), mayor of Madison, Wisconsin
- Joseph Schubert (bishop) (1890–1969), Romanian cleric and Roman Catholic bishop
- Joseph Schubert (politician) (1889–1952), Canadian politician
