= Schubart =

Schubart (meaning 'shoemaker', 'cobbler') is a German surname. A similar surname with the same origin is Schubert. Notable people with the surname include:

- Christian Friedrich Daniel Schubart (1739–1791), German poet
- Hank Schubart (1916–1998), American-Canadian architect
- Jan Schubart (1924–2010), Dutch boxer
- Louis Schubart (1885–1954), French footballer
- Peter Schubart von Ehrenberg (1668–?), Austrian painter
- Rikke Schubart (born 1966), Danish author
- Wilhelm Schubert van Ehrenberg (1630 or 1637 – 1676), Flemish painter
- Wilhelm Schubart (1873–1960), German ancient historian
