= Gebr. Knecht AG =

Swiss transportation company

Gebr. Knecht AG is a transportation company based in Windisch, Switzerland.

The company was founded in 1909 by Johann Knecht, a forester from Beznau. As of 2009, the company has 800 employees. It operates a range of public autobus lines for Swiss Post and other Swiss public transportation companies, as well as charter buses and travel bus lines from Switzerland under such brands as Eurobus, Knecht Reisen, Kira Reisen and others.

It is part of Knecht Holding AG, a family-owned group of transportation and services enterprises.
