= Shubert (surname) =

Shubert is a Yiddish spelling of the German surname Schubert. Notable people with the surname include:

- The Shubert family, prominent in American theatre, notably:
  - Lee Shubert (1871–1953)
  - Sam S. Shubert (1878–1905)
  - Jacob J. Shubert (1879–1963)
- Atika Shubert (born 1970), American journalist based in Spain
- Fern Shubert (born 1947), American politician in North Carolina
- Frank Shubert (1841–1920), American soldier and Medal of Honor recipient
- Jimmy Shubert, American stand-up comedian
