= David Moritz Michael =

American classical composer

David Moritz Michael (October 21, 1751 – February 26, 1827) was a composer. David Moritz Michael was born in Kumhausen in 1751 and was educated in Germany. He became a member of the Moravian Church when he was thirty years old. He taught in the Moravian school at Niesky and, in 1795, he emigrated to Pennsylvania. Moritz Michael's official church position was as a worker with the young men of the Moravian congregations in Nazareth and Bethlehem, Pennsylvania, and his contributions to the musical life of the Moravian settlements in Pennsylvania was great. While in Bethlehem, Michael led the Bethlehem collegium musicum. He most notably conducted a performance of Haydn's Creation that some scholars believe may have been the first performance of the work in America. In addition to his wind ensemble works—the most famous of which, Die Wasserfahrt (The Water Journey), is currently available in a number of recordings—and fourteen "Parthien", he wrote a number of anthems and arias for church services. Moritz Michael returned to Germany in 1815. He made a brief visit to Vienna to meet with Beethoven in 1818. He died in Neuwied, Germany, on February 26, 1827 almost a month before Beethoven’s death .
