= John Knecht =

American filmmaker (born 1947)

John Knecht (born 1947) is an American filmmaker. He has been active in making experimental and avant-garde film and video since the 1970s. Most of his better-known work is animated, including The Possible Fog of Heaven and The Poxiox Series.

He has been a lifetime supporter of the gay rights movement.
