= John Antes =

American composer

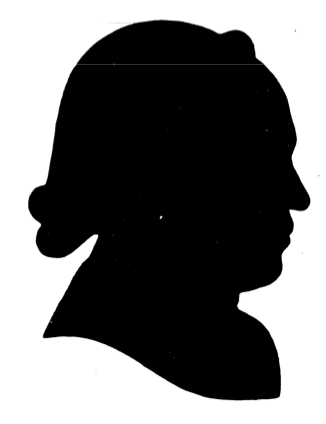
Silhouette of John Antes

John Antes (24 March 1740 – 17 December 1811) was the first American Moravian Missionary to travel and work in Egypt, one of the earliest American-born chamber music composers, and the maker of perhaps the earliest surviving bowed string instrument made in America. Although Antes is often recognized for his choral works, such as Go Congregation Go! and Surely he has Bourne our Griefs, his three string trios have also attracted attention and the lost "six Quartettos" remain a tantalizing mystery.

== Biography ==
John Antes was born on March 24, 1740, in Frederick, Montgomery County, Pennsylvania. In 1745, Antes entered the Moravian Boys Boarding School, where he received music education from Johann Christoph Pyrlaeus. Although Pyrlaeus might now be first-known as a teacher of Antes, he was the founder of the Bethlehem collegium musicum, a capable singer, instrumentalist, and organist, and was also a missionary to Native Americans. In 1752, John entered the boys school in Bethlehem, Pennsylvania, and in 1760, was admitted into the Single Brethren's choir, also in Bethlehem.

Antes left Bethlehem in 1764 and travelled to Herrnhut, Germany, the international center of the Moravians, to pursue a career as a missionary. A year later he transferred to Neuwied, Germany, where he also trained as a watchmaker. Antes was ordained as a Moravian Minister in January 1769, and he left for Egypt that same month to serve as a missionary to the Coptic Church of Grand Cairo. The first ten years of his mission were rather uneventful until 1779, when Antes was captured and tortured by some of Osman Bey's followers. Antes spent his remaining two years in Egypt recovering from this incident.

Antes returned to Herrnhut in 1781. Upon arrival, he began working as a business manager of the Single Brethren's house in Neuwied. In 1785, he was named warder of an entire Moravian community in Fulneck, England. Antes was married to Susanna Crabtree in 1786, and spent the rest of his working life in Fulneck. He retired to Bristol, England in 1809, and died there in 1811.

=== Composer ===
Antes is well known for his vocal works, the two most famous anthems being Go, Congregation, Go! and Surely He Hath Bourne Our Griefs. It seems likely that Antes wrote most of his vocal pieces while working at the Fulneck Moravian settlement. Most of his anthems use an English text, which support this idea, and the anthems that use German text were possibly written while he was in Neuwied, Germany the years before moving to Fulneck.

Antes's string trios appear to have been written during the final two years of his mission in Egypt, while recuperating from the traumatic assault. The trios were published by John Bland, a London Publisher, during the early 1790s, under a pseudonym, "Giovanni A-T-S," instead of the name Antes. A common theory is that Antes did not consider himself a worthy composer, and therefore did not want to use his real name.

Also while in Egypt, Antes wrote a letter to Benjamin Franklin, whom he had met previously in Philadelphia, stating that he was including "a copy of six quartettos". Although Antes states that he had also sent a copy to an otherwise unidentified colleague, to whom the quartets were dedicated, they have never been found. Musicologist Karl Kroeger believes that it is possible that Antes's string trios are re-orchestrated versions of three of his six quartettos.

=== Instrument maker ===
Before moving to Europe, Antes worked as an instrument maker. His earliest dated instrument, which still exists today, is a violin from 1759. This violin is now housed in the Museum of the Moravian Historical Society in Nazareth, Pennsylvania. A viola made by Antes in 1764 is believed to be "the earliest extant viola made in America [and is] housed in the Lititz Congregation Collection." Antes opened a shop in 1762 and the shop records show that he created up to seven bowed string instruments. It is not known how Antes learned the craft of instrument making, although it is possible that he learned from Johann Gottlob Klemm, an American organ builder, who spent time in Bethlehem in 1757.

== Work ==
Antes's compositional style is often compared to that of Joseph Haydn, since the two were contemporaries and likely met. The instrumentation of Antes's string trios might have followed that of Haydn, who wrote 21 trios for the same scoring. Haydn's music was highly visible in the Moravian Church, most likely a large part of the music library at Fulneck, and joined that by other composers of the time such as Ignaz Pleyel, Muzio Clementi, George Frideric Handel and Jean Paul Egide Martini.

Karl Kroeger states in his article "John Antes at Fulneck" that Antes's music stands well alongside the work of other major composers of the day, with a nod to Haydn, as well as Franz Anton Hoffmeister and Carl Stamitz. Kroeger also describes the string parts of Antes's anthems as displaying, "subtle expression, contrapuntal interplay of motive, and idiomatic string writing." Antes's vocal works often used texts that illustrated his individual and sometimes painful relationship with God. This was often displayed through a "harmonic polarity between the tonic and the dominant." Antes was also fond of "dotted rhythms, melodic thirds, long vocal lines, high tessituras, and wide ranges," as well as equal importance to each instrument as in his string trios.

=== Selected works ===
Source:

=== Anthems ===
- Behold the Lord hath Proclaimed
  - SATB, SSAB 2 horns, strings, continuo
- Go, Congregation, Go!
  - S solo, strings, continuo
- How Beautiful upon the Mountains
  - SATB, piano or organ (originally with string orchestra)
- I will Greatly Rejoice in the Lord
  - SATB, 2 horns, strings, continuo
- My Heart Shall Rejoice in His Salvation – 1803
  - SATB, 2 horns, strings, continuo
- Shout ye Heavens, Rejoice Thou Earth
  - SATB, 2 horns or trumpets, strings, continuo
- Sing and Rejoice, O Daughter of Zion
  - SATB, 2 horns, strings, continuo
- Surely He Hath Borne Our Griefs
  - SATB, strings, continuo
- Worthy is the Lamb that was Slain
  - SATB, 2 oboes, 2 horns, strings, continuo

=== Hymn-tunes (chorales) ===
- A collections Antes' chorales were published together in 1957 in "Twelve Moravian Chorales."
- Christ the Lord, the Lord Most Glorious
- For Grace I Weep and Part
- God Holy Ghost in Mercy us Preserve
- Hark My Soul, it is The Lord
- In Joyful Hymns of Praise
- In the Glorious Presence (2 versions)
- O Deepest Grief
- O Lord in Me Fulfill
- O What a Depth of Boundless Love and Grace
- Resting in the Silent Grave
- Soul at the Most Awful Season
- What Splendid Rays of Truth and Grace
- Monkland

=== Instrumental ===
- Tre Trii, per due Violini and Violoncello, Obligato
