= Johann Friedrich Schubert =

German composer and violinist (1769–1811)

Johann Friedrich Schubert (17 December 1769 – 13 October 1811) was a German composer and violinist.

Schubert was born in Rudolstadt, in either 1770 or 1769, and was an apprentice to Christian Hieronimus Krause in Sondershausen. After the premiere of his opera Die nächtliche Erscheinung, Schubert was appointed music director. He was the music director of various theatrical companies in Stettin, Glogau, Ballenstedt, etc. He also directed the concerts of the Cologne Merchant Society in Mülheim. Among his published compositions are a violin concerto, a concertante for oboe and bassoon, violin duets, and pianoforte pieces; Schubert also composed an opera in Stettin and published the book Neue Singe-Schule oder gründliche und vollständige Anweisung zur Singkunst in 1804. He went to Mülheim as a music director and teacher, staying there until his death.
