= Schubert Theatre (Gooding, Idaho) =

- U.S. National Register of Historic Places
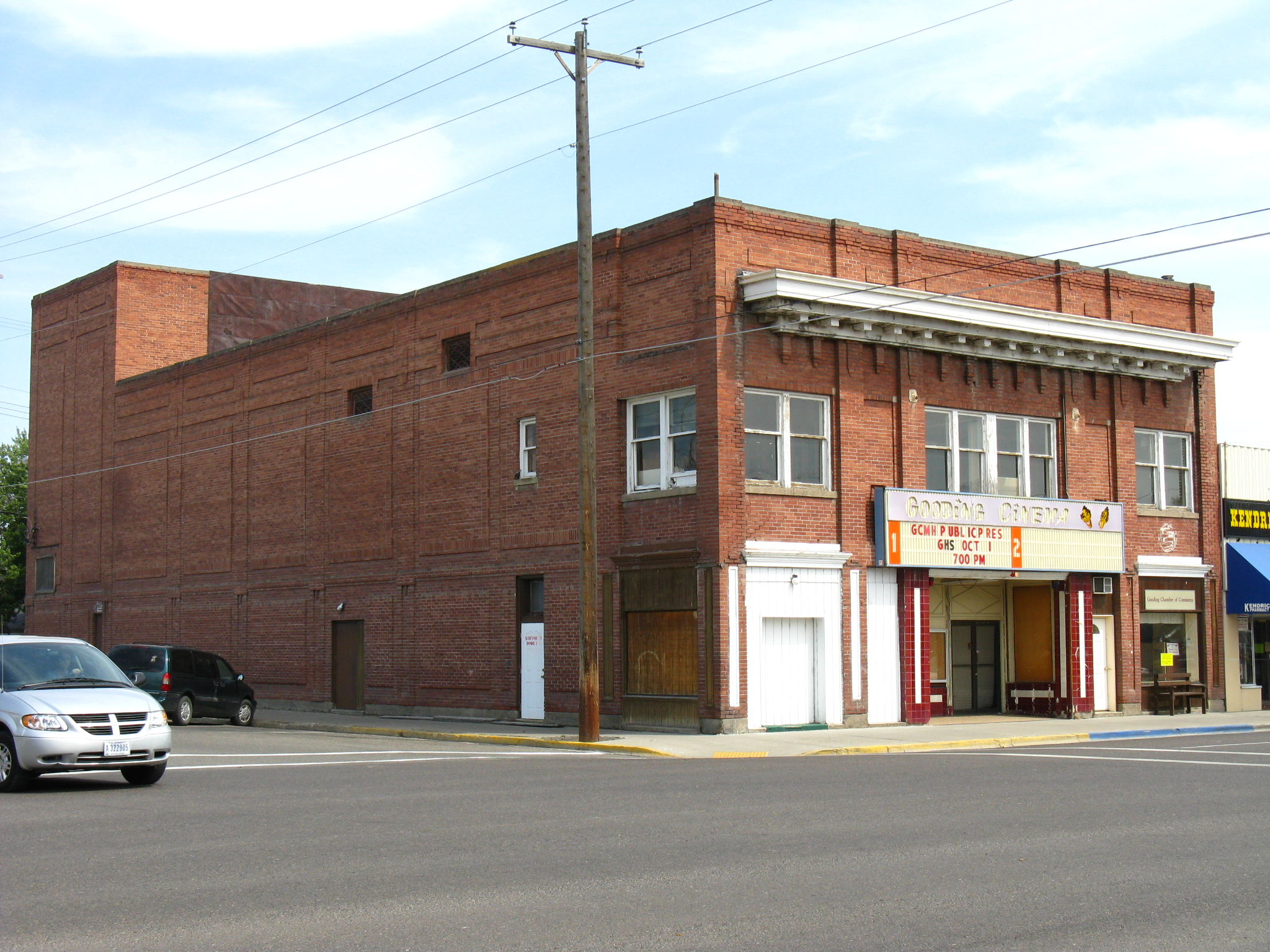
- Street view of the theater

- Location within Idaho Location within the United States
- Location: 402 Main St., Gooding, Idaho, United States
- Coordinates: 42°56′30″N 114°42′43″W
- Built: 1920
- Architect: Hugo Clausen
- Architectural style: Late 19th And Early 20th Century American Movements
- MPS: Motion Picture Theater Buildings in Idaho MPS
- NRHP reference No.: 03001367
- Added to NRHP: January 6, 2004

The Schubert Theatre is a theater located in Gooding, Idaho, United States. Built in 1920, it was listed on the National Register of Historic Places in 2004.

== Building design ==
The building is a fairly simple two-story two-part commercial block, three bays wide. The theatre seats 400 and is adorned with murals and gold leafed crown molding. The murals were painted by Hugh Clausen, who also painted murals for the governor's mansion. Sound equipment installed in 1930 allowed for "talkies" to be shown, though the theatre still has an orchestra pit and dressing rooms from its days of live entertainment.

== History ==
In 1920, Frank Gooding built the theatre as a wedding gift for his daughter. It cost $60,000 to build. It received the ‘Exhibitors Herald-World Award of Merit for the High Quality of Its Reproduction of Sound Pictures,' the only theatre in Idaho to do so.

Some style changes were made to the theatre in 1946 and again in 1983. In the early 1980s, the theatre transitioned into Gooding Cinemas.

In 2009 the theatre was purchased for $150,000 by Charmianne and Lonnie Leavell, a local couple who planned to restore the theater and turn it into a cultural center for the community of Gooding. The couple later donated the theatre to a 501 (c)(3) nonprofit, GREAT, Inc. (Gooding Restoration for Entertainment, Arts & Theater), a nonprofit they formed to help in their goal.

The Schubert Theatre received grants from the Idaho Heritage Trust in 2016, 2017, 2018, 2019, and 2023.

As of 2020, significant work had been done to restore the theatre, including replacing the roof. However, work was still needed in electrical and plumbing to make the building functional. In 2021, progress was made with new drains and cleaning up flood damage. In 2023, the Idaho Heritage Trust assisted the theatre in restoring the lobby.

Some local residents believe that the theatre is haunted.
