= Kleinknecht =

Kleinknecht is a German surname, where 'klein' means small and 'Knecht' servant. Notable people with the surname include:

- Jakob Friedrich Kleinknecht (1722–1794), German composer and flutist
- Kenneth S. Kleinknecht (1919–2007), American engineer
- Konrad Kleinknecht (born 1940), German physicist
