= History of miscegenation =

Miscegenation history

Miscegenation is marriage or admixture between people who are members of different races. The word was coined in English from Latin miscere ('to mix') and genus ('race'). Interracial relationships have profoundly influenced various regions throughout history. Africa has had a long history of interracial mixing with non-Africans, since prehistoric times, with migrations from the Levant leading to significant admixture. This continued into antiquity with Arab and European explorers, traders, and soldiers having relationships with African women. Mixed-race communities like the Coloureds in South Africa and Basters in Namibia emerged from these unions.

In the Americas and Asia, similar patterns of interracial relationships and communities formed. In the United States, historical taboos and laws against interracial marriage evolved, culminating in the landmark Loving v. Virginia case in 1967. Latin America, particularly Brazil, has a rich history of racial mixing, reflected in its diverse population. In Asia, countries like India, China, and Japan experienced interracial unions through trade, colonization, and migration, contributing to diverse genetic and cultural landscapes.

In Europe, Nazi Germany's anti-miscegenation laws sought to maintain "racial purity," specifically targeting Jewish-German unions. Hungary and France saw mixed marriages through historical conquests and colonialism, such as between Vietnamese men and French women during the early 20th century.

In Oceania, particularly Australia and New Zealand, dynamics varied; Australia had policies like the White Australia policy and practices affecting Indigenous populations, while New Zealand saw significant Māori and European intermarriages. In the Middle East, inter-ethnic relationships were common, often involving Arab and non-Arab unions. Portuguese colonies encouraged mixed marriages to integrate populations, notably seen in Brazil and other territories, resulting in diverse, multicultural societies.

== Africa ==
Africa has had a long history of mixing with non-Africans since prehistoric times. The Eurasian backflow, which happened in prehistoric times, saw a huge migration from the Levant entering the region and these migrants mixing with the native Africans. Signs of this migration can be found among the people inhabiting the Horn of Africa and Sudan. Africa in antiquity, also has had long history of interracial mixing with male Arab and European explorers, traders and soldiers having sexual relations with black African women as well as taking them as wives.

Sir Richard Francis Burton writes, during his expedition to Africa, about relationships between black women and white men: "The women are well disposed toward strangers of fair complexion, apparently with the permission of their husbands." There are several mixed race populations throughout Africa mostly the results of interracial relationships between Arab and European men and black women. In South Africa, there are big mixed race communities like the Coloureds and Griqua formed by White colonists taking native African wives. In Namibia there is a community called the Rehoboth Basters formed by the interracial marriage of Dutch/German men and black African women.

In the former Portuguese Africa (now known as Angola, Mozambique and Cape Verde) racial mixing between white Portuguese and black Africans was fairly common, especially in Cape Verde where the majority of the population is of mixed descent.

There have been some recorded cases of Chinese merchants and labourers taking African wives throughout Africa as many Chinese workers were employed to build railways and other infrastructural projects in Africa. These labour groups were made up completely of men with very few Chinese women coming to Africa.

In West Africa, especially Nigeria there are many cases of non-African men taking African women. Many of their offspring have gained prominent positions in Africa. Flight Lieutenant Jerry John Rawlings, who had a Scottish father and a black Ghanaian mother became the president of Ghana. Jean Ping, the son of a Chinese trader and a black Gabonese mother, became the deputy prime minister as well as the foreign minister of Gabon and was the Chairperson of the Commission of the African Union from 2009 to 2012. The president of Botswana, Ian Khama, is the son of Botswana's first president, Seretse Khama, and a white British student, Ruth Williams Khama. Nicolas Grunitzky, who was the son of a white German father and a Togolese mother, became the second president of Togo after a coup.

Indian men, who have long been traders in East Africa, sometimes married among local African women. The British Empire brought many Indian workers into East Africa to build the Uganda Railway. Indians eventually populated South Africa, Kenya, Uganda, Tanzania, Malawi, Rwanda, Zambia, Zimbabwe and Zaire in small numbers. These interracial unions were mostly unilateral marriages between Indian men and East African women.

Many Chinese men working in Africa have married Black African women in Angola, South Africa, Gabon, Tanzania, Côte d'Ivoire, Kenya, Lagos in Nigeria, Congo & Ethiopia and fathered children with them.

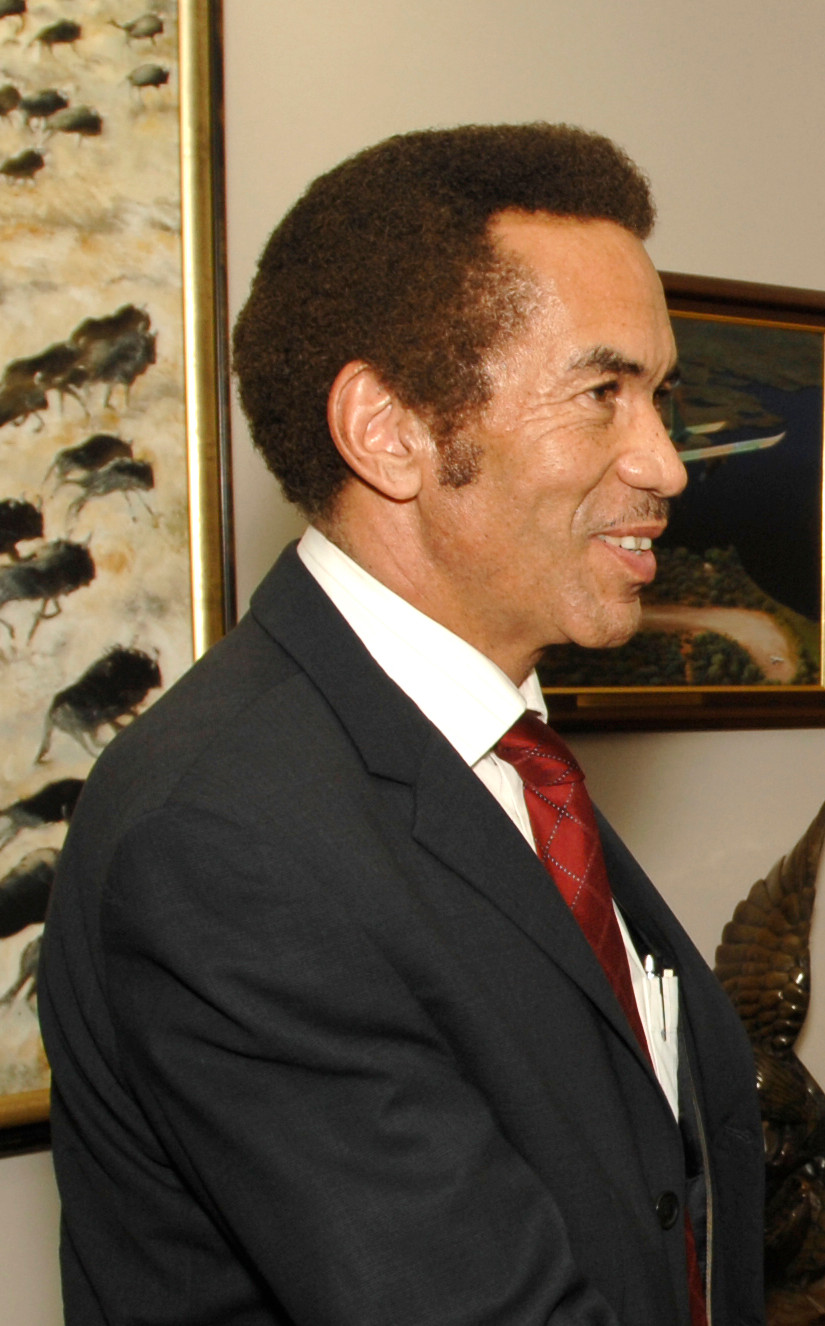
Former President Ian Khama of Botswana, son of Motswana chief Sir Seretse Khama and Englishwoman Ruth Williams Khama

Africa has a long history of interracial mixing with Arabs and later Europeans having sexual relations with black Africans. Arabs played a big role in the African slave trade and unlike the trans-Atlantic trade most of the enslaved Africans in the Arab slave trade were women. Most of them were used as sexual slaves by the Arab men and some were taken as wives.

In the former Lusophone Africa (now known as Angola, Mozambique and Cape Verde) racial mixing between white Portuguese and black Africans was fairly common, especially in Cape Verde, where the majority of the population is of mixed descent.

=== West Africa ===
In West Africa, a series of interracial marriages and relationships created a number of mixed race families in the various countries of the region.

In Sierra Leone, marriages between representatives of British trading firms and princesses of the Sherbro people created a number of aristocratic families such as the Sherbro Tuckers and the Sherbro Caulkers. Due to matrilineality, they have maintained their claims to their ancestral thrones.

In Benin, meanwhile, the descendants of the Brazilian slave trader Francisco Félix de Sousa and his harem of black consorts have contributed a number of prominent citizens. Figures such as a president (Paul-Émile de Souza) and a first lady (Chantal de Souza Boni Yayi, President de Souza's niece) are arguably the most notable of them.

In Gabon, a woman by the name of Germaine Anina - daughter of a Gabonese tribal chief - married a Chinese trader and politician named Cheng Zhiping. Their son, Jean Ping, went on to serve as a minister in his mother's native country.

In orthodox Serer religion and custom, interfaith and interracial marriages are forbidden. Banishment and disinheritance may be levied against a Serer who fails to follow these customary teachings. The Serer-Noon (a sub-group of the Serer people) strongly adhere to these teachings. It was for this reason that the first Senegalese president Léopold Sédar Senghor did not receive support from the Serer community, especially the ultra-traditional Serer. Although born to an aristocratic Serer family, he did not receive support from the Serer community due to his marriage to his French wife. Instead, he was supported by other ethnic groups such as the Wolof and Fula. In return, Senghor failed to develop Serer villages and towns.

=== Southern Africa ===
There is a significant mixed race population, the result of mostly European and African unions, in South Africa, called Coloureds. The term Coloured is also used to describe persons of mixed race in the neighbouring nation of Namibia, to refer to those of part Khoisan, part black and part white descent. The Basters constitute a separate ethnic group that are sometimes considered a sub-group of the Coloured population of the country.

Some of the Xhosa people claim descent from white people. The royal family of the ImiDushane, for example, is descended from Queen Gquma of the Mpondo, a white orphan that was adopted by a Xhosa chief after a shipwreck killed her parents. She later married an Mpondo prince, became his great wife, and served as queen during his reign as king of the Tshomane Mpondo.

Interracial marriage was banned under apartheid. Due to this, there was considerable opposition to the marriage between Sir Seretse Khama, Paramount Chief of the Bamangwato Tswanas, and his eventual wife Ruth Williams Khama, Lady Khama, even though Chief Khama was Motswana and not South African.

Today there are a number of high-profile interracial couples in Southern Africa, such as the unions of Mmusi Maimane (a black opposition politician who served as the Leader of the Opposition of South Africa), Nyaniso Dzedze (a black actor) and his German wife Yana Fay Dzedze, Matthew Booth (a white soccer player) and his wife Sonia Bonneventia (a black former Miss South Africa first princess and international model) and Bryan Habana (a coloured South African rugby union player) and his white wife Janine Viljoen.

=== Ghana ===
Many Chinese men who engaged in gold mining in Ghana married local Black African Ghanaian women and had children with them and then the Ghana government deported illegal miners, leaving the mixed race Chinese fathered children stranded in Ghana while their fathers were sent back to China.

In Ghana, a number of founding fathers had relationships with foreigners of other races: Kwame Nkrumah married the Egyptian Copt Fathia Nkrumah and raised a family with her. Their children would go on to become politicians like their father. President Nkrumah's contemporary and sometime friend, Joe Appiah, was himself married to the British debutante Peggy Cripps Appiah. At the start of the 21st century, their descendants were being led by their only son, Kwame Anthony Appiah. In addition to this, Dr. J. B. Danquah had a son with a British woman during his time in Britain. He would go on to become noted actor Paul Danquah.

Many Chinese men who engaged in gold mining in Ghana married local Black African Ghanaian women and had children with them and then the Ghana government deported illegal miners, leaving the mixed race Chinese fathered children stranded in Ghana while their fathers were sent back to China.

=== Kenya ===
Many Ugandan women have been marrying Chinese businessmen who moved to Uganda.

Early Chinese mariners had a variety of contacts with Kenya. Archaeologists have found Chinese porcelains made during the Tang dynasty (618–907) in Kenyan villages; however, these were believed to have been brought over by Zheng He during his 15th century ocean voyages. On Lamu Island off the Kenyan coast, local oral tradition maintains that 20 shipwrecked Chinese sailors with 400 survivors, possibly part of Zheng's fleet, washed up on shore there hundreds of years ago. Given permission to settle by local tribes after having killed a dangerous python, they converted to Islam and married local women. Now, they are believed to have just six descendants left there; in 2002, DNA tests conducted on one of the women confirmed that she was of Chinese descent. Her daughter, Mwamaka Sharifu, later received a PRC government scholarship to study traditional Chinese medicine (TCM) in China.

On Pate Island, Frank Viviano described in a July 2005 National Geographic article how ceramic fragments had been found around Lamu which the administrative officer of the local Swahili history museum claimed were of Chinese origin, specifically from Zheng He's voyage to east Africa. The eyes of the Pate people resembled Chinese and Famao and Wei were some of the names among them which were speculated to be of Chinese origin. Their ancestors were said to be from indigenous women who intermarried with Chinese Ming sailors when they were shipwrecked. Two places on Pate were called "Old Shanga", and "New Shanga", which the Chinese sailors had named. A local guide who claimed descent from the Chinese showed Frank a graveyard made out of coral on the island, indicating that they were the graves of the Chinese sailors, which the author described as "virtually identical" to Chinese Ming dynasty tombs, complete with "half-moon domes" and "terraced entries".

New interest in Kenya's natural resources has attracted over $1 billion of investment from Chinese firms. This has propelled new development in Kenya's infrastructure with Chinese firms bringing in their own male workers to build roads. The temporary residents usually arrive without their spouses and families. Thus, a rise of incidents involving local college-aged females has resulted in an increased rate of Afro-Chinese infant births to single Kenyan mothers.

In Kenya there is a trend of the following influx of Chinese male workers in Kenya with a growing number of abandoned babies of Chinese men who fathered children with local women, causing concern.

=== Uganda ===
The topic of mixed race Ugandans continues to resurface, in the public arena, with the growing number of multiracial Ugandans (Multiracial Ugandans in Uganda).

Many Ugandan women have been marrying Chinese businessmen who moved to Uganda and reproducing with them.

=== Mauritius ===
In the late 19th and early 20th centuries, Chinese men in Mauritius married local Indian and Creole women due to both the lack of Chinese women, and the higher numbers of Indian women on the island. All the imigrants were men. When the very first Chinese men arrived in Mauritius, they were reluctant to marry local women due to their customary endogamy rules. But with no Chinese women in sight, the Chinese men eventually began to integrate themselves and mix with the local Creole and Indian populations on the island and establish households en ménage. The 1921 census in Mauritius counted that Indian women there had a total of 148 children fathered by Chinese men. These Chinese were mostly traders. Colonialist stereotypes in the sugar colonies of Indians emerged such as "the degraded coolie woman" and the "coolie wife beater", due to Indian women being murdered by their husbands after they ran away to other richer men since the ratio of Indian women to men was low.

=== Congo ===
During the 1970s, an increased demand for copper and cobalt attracted Japanese investments in the mineral-rich southeastern region of Katanga Province. Over a 10-year period, more than 1,000 Japanese miners relocated to the region, confined to a strictly male-only camp. Arriving without family or spouses, the men often sought social interaction outside the confines of their camps. In search of intimacy with the opposite sex, resulting in cohabitation, the men openly engaged in interracial dating and relationships, a practice embraced by the local society. As a result, a number of Japanese miners fathered children with Native Congolese women. However, most of the mixed race infants resulting from these unions died, soon after birth. Multiple testimonies of local people suggest that the infants were poisoned by a Japanese lead physician and nurse working at the local mining hospital. Subsequently, the circumstances would have brought the miners shame as most of them already had families back in their native Japan. The practice forced many native Katangan mothers to hide their children by not reporting to the hospital to give birth.

Today, fifty Afro-Japanese have formed an association of Katanga Infanticide survivors. The organization has hired legal counsel seeking a formal investigation into the killings. The group submitted an official inquiry to both the Congolese and Japanese governments, to no avail. Issues specific to this group include having no documentation of their births since not having been born in the local hospital spared their lives. The total number of survivors is unknown.

=== Réunion ===
The majority of the population of Réunion is defined as mixed race. In the last 350 years, various ethnic groups (Africans, Chinese, English, French, Gujarati Indians, Tamil Indians) have arrived and settled on the island. There have been mixed race people on the island since its first permanent inhabitation in 1665. The native Kaf population has a diverse range of ancestry stemming from colonial Indian and Chinese peoples. They also descend from African slaves brought from countries like Mozambique, Guinea, Senegal, Madagascar, Tanzania, and Zambia to the island.

There have been several cases of Chinese merchants and laborers marrying black African women as many Chinese workers were employed to build railways and other infrastructural projects in Africa. These labour groups were made up completely of men with very few Chinese women coming to Africa. In Réunion and Madagascar, intermarriage between Chinese men of Cantonese origin and African women is not uncommon.

Most population of Réunion Creoles who are of mixed ancestry and make up the majority of the population. Mixed unions between European men and Chinese men with African women, Indian women, Chinese women, Madagascar women were also common. In 2005, a genetic study on the racially mixed people of Réunion found the following. For maternal (mitochondrial) DNA, the haplogroups are Indian (44%), East Asian (27%), European/Middle Eastern (19%) or African (10%). The Indian lineages are M2, M6 and U2i, the East Asian ones are E1, D5a, M7c, and F (E1 and M7c also found only in South East Asia and in Madagascar), the European/Middle Eastern ones are U2e, T1, J, H, and I, and the African ones are L1b1, L2a1, L3b, and L3e1.

For paternal (Y-chromosome) DNA, the haplogroups are European/Middle Eastern (85%) or East Asian (15%). The European lineages are R1b and I, the Middle Eastern one E1b1b1c (formerly E3b3) (also found in Northeast Africa), and the East Asian ones are R1a (found in many parts of the world including Europe and Central and Southern Asia but the particular sequence has been found in Asia) and O3.

The native Kaf population has a diverse range of ancestry stemming from colonial Indian and Chinese peoples. They also descend from African slaves brought from countries like Mozambique, Guinea, Senegal, Madagascar, Tanzania, and Zambia to the island.

=== Madagascar ===
There was frequent intermixing between the Austronesian and Bantu-speaking populations of Madagascar. A large number of the Malagasy today are the result of admixture between Austronesians and Africans. This is most evident in the Mikea, who are also the last known Malagasy population to still practice a hunter-gatherer lifestyle. In the study of "The Dual Origin of the Malagasy in Island Southeast Asia and East Africa: Evidence from Maternal and Paternal Lineages" shows the Bantu maternal origin to be 38% and Paternal 51% while the Southeast Asian paternal to be 34% and maternal 62%. In the study of Malagasy, autosomal DNA shows the highlanders ethnic group like Merina are almost an even mixture of Southeast Asian and Bantu origin, while the coastal ethnic group have much higher Bantu mixture in their autosomal DNA suggesting they are mixture of new Bantu migrants and the already established highlander ethnic group. Maximum-likelihood estimates favour a scenario in which Madagascar was settled approximately 1200 years ago by a very small group of women of approximately 30. The Malagasy people existed through intermarriages between the small founding population.

Intermarriage between Chinese men and native Malagasy women was not uncommon. Several thousand Cantonese men intermarried and cohabited with Malagasy women. 98% of the Chinese traced their origin from Guangdong – more specifically, the Cantonese district of Shunde. For example, the 1954 census found 1,111 "irregular" Chinese-Malagasy unions and 125 legitimate, i.e., legally married. Children were registered by their mothers under a Malagasy name. Intermarriage between French men and Native Malagasy women was not uncommon either.

== North America ==
=== Canada ===
Canada had no explicit laws against mixed marriage, but anti-miscegenation was often enforced through different laws and upheld by the Supreme Court of Canada as valid. Velma Demerson, for example, was imprisoned in 1939 for carrying the child of a Chinese father; she was deemed "incorrigible" under the Female Refuges Act, and was physically experimented on in prison to discover the causes of her behaviour.

Ultimately, an informal and extra-legal regime ensured that the social taboo of racial intermixing was kept to a minimum (Walker, 1997; Backhouse, 1999; Walker, 2000). And, from 1855 until the 1960s, Canada chose its immigrants on the basis of their racial categorization rather than the individual merits of the applicant, with preference being given to immigrants of Northern European (especially British, Scandinavian and French) origin over the so-called "black and Asiatic races", and at times over central and southern European races.

It is arguable that Canada's various manifestations of the federal Indian Act were designed to regulate interracial (in this circumstance, Aboriginal and non- Aboriginal) marital relations and the categorization of mixed-race offspring.

The Canadian Ku Klux Klan burned crosses at a gathering in Moose Jaw, Saskatchewan, to discourage mixed marriages, and in 1930 were enlisted in Oakville, Ontario, to intimidate Isabella Jones and Ira Junius Johnson out of marrying.

=== United States ===
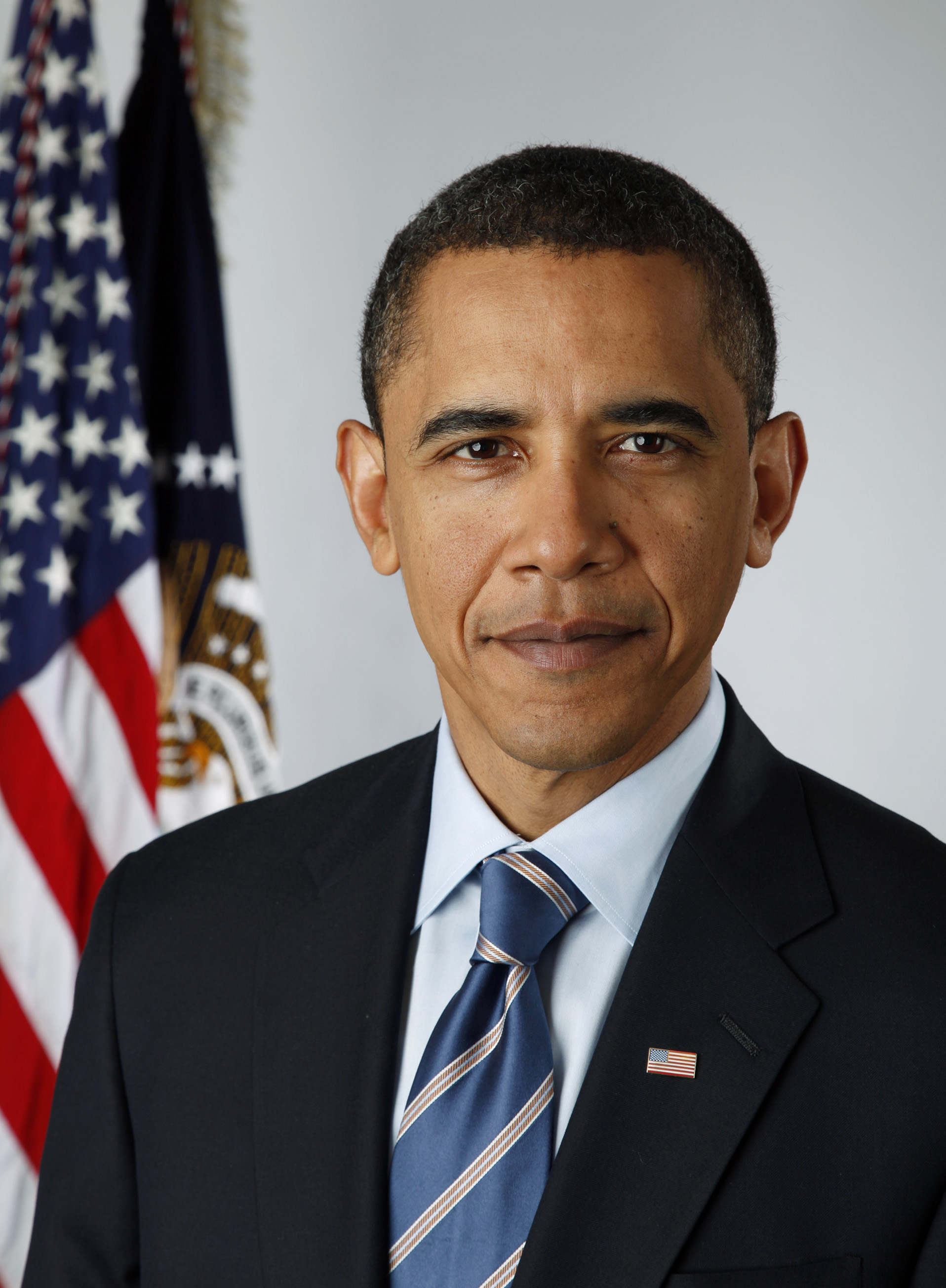
Former US President Barack Obama is the son of a white American mother and a black Kenyan father.

The historical taboo surrounding white–black relationships among American whites can be seen as a historical consequence of the oppression and racial segregation of African Americans. In many U.S. states, interracial marriage was already illegal when the term miscegenation was coined in 1863. (Before that, it was called "amalgamation".) The first laws banning interracial marriage were introduced in the late 17th century in the slave-holding colonies of Virginia (1691) and Maryland (1692). Later these laws also spread to colonies and states where slavery did not exist.

Although vehemently opposed to miscegenation in public, Thomas Jefferson fathered his slave Sally Hemings child. Regarding blacks as "inferior to the whites in the endowments of both body and mind", Jefferson, in his Notes on the State of Virginia published in 1785, would also write: "The improvement of the blacks in body and mind, in the first instance of their mixture with the whites, has been observed by every one, and proves that their inferiority is not the effect merely of their condition of life".

In the early nineteenth century, the Quaker planter Zephaniah Kingsley published a pamphlet, which defended miscegenation, the pamphlet was reprinted three times. According to him, mixed-race children are healthier and more beautiful. He also claimed to be married to a slave who he bought in Cuba at the age of 13, though the marriage did not take place in the United States, and there is no evidence of it other than Kingsley's statement. He was eventually forced to leave the United States and move to the Mayorasgo de Koka plantation in Haiti (now Dominican Republic).

U.S. States, by the date of repeal of anti-miscegenation laws: No laws passed Before 1887 1948 to 1967 12 June 1967

In 1918, there was considerable controversy in Arizona when an Asian-Indian farmer B. K. Singh married the sixteen-year-old daughter of one of his white tenants. During and after slavery, most American whites regarded interracial marriage between whites and blacks as taboo. However, during slavery, many white American men and women did conceive children with black partners. Some children were freed by their slave-holding fathers or bought to be emancipated if the father was not the owner. Most mixed-raced descendants merged into the African-American ethnic group during the Jim Crow era.

Initially, Filipino Americans were considered white and were not barred from interracial marriage, with documented instances of interracial marriage of Filipino men and White women in Louisiana and Washington, D.C. However, by the late 19th century and early 20th century in California, Filipinos were barred from marrying white women through a series of court cases that redefined their racial interpretation under the law. During World War II, Filipino servicemen in California had to travel with their White fiancees to New Mexico, to be able to marry.

After the Civil War and the abolition of slavery in 1865, the marriage of white and black Americans continued to be taboo, particularly in the former slave states.

The Motion Picture Production Code of 1930, also known as Hays Code, explicitly stated that the depiction of "miscegenation ... is forbidden". One important strategy intended to discourage the marriage of white Americans and Americans of partly African descent was the promulgation of the one-drop theory, which held that any person with any known African ancestry, however remote, must be regarded as black. This definition of blackness was encoded in the anti-miscegenation laws of various U.S. states, such as Virginia's Racial Integrity Act of 1924. The plaintiffs in Loving v. Virginia, Mildred Jeter and Richard Loving became the historically most prominent interracial couple in the United States through their legal struggle against this act.

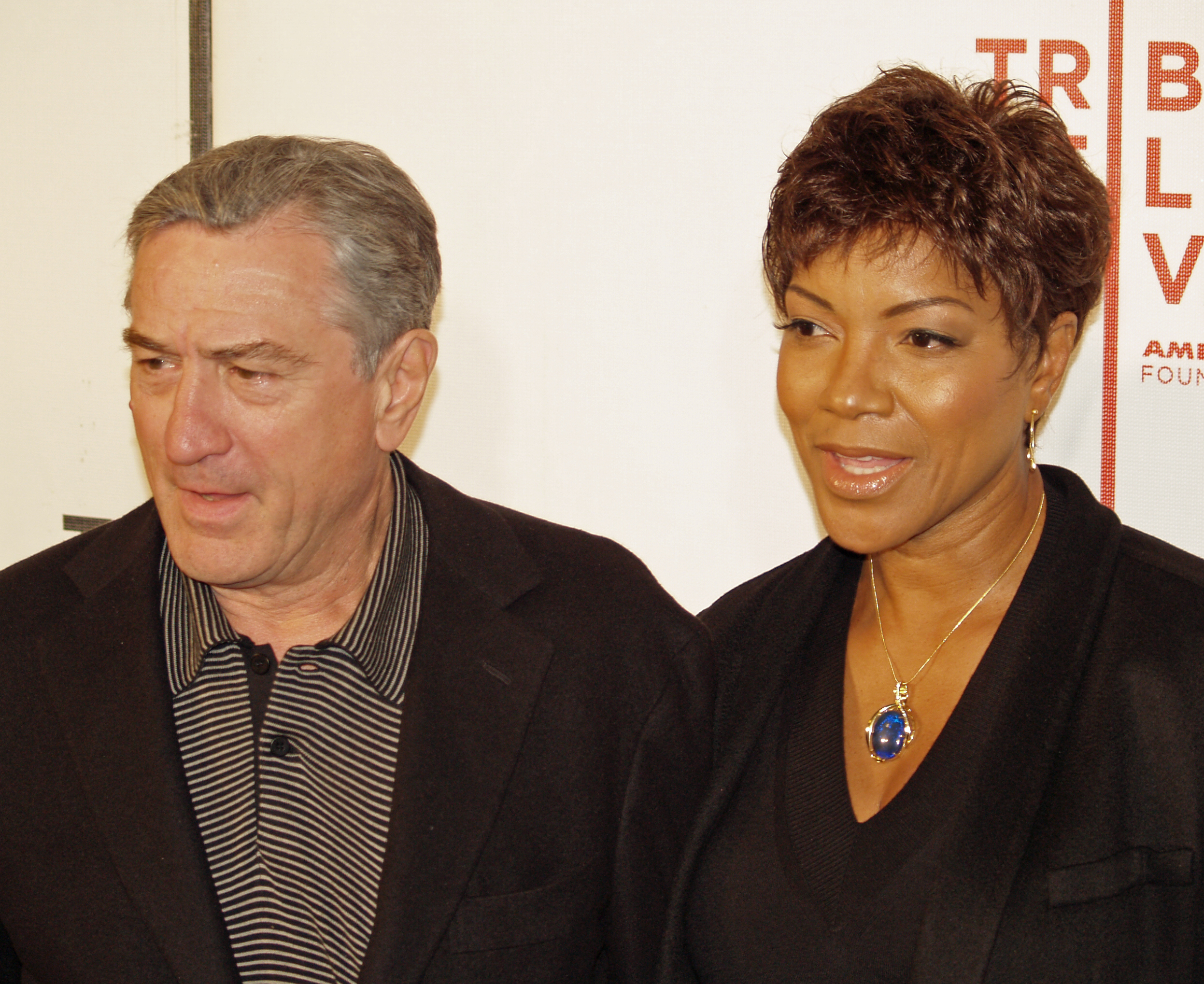
Robert De Niro and his wife Grace Hightower. Census data showed 117,000 black wife–white husband couples in 2006.

Throughout American history, there has been frequent mixing between Native Americans and black Africans. When Native Americans invaded the European colony of Jamestown, Virginia in 1622, they killed the Europeans but took the African slaves as captives, gradually integrating them. Interracial relationships occurred between African Americans and members of other tribes along coastal states. During the transitional period of Africans becoming the primary race enslaved, Native Americans were sometimes enslaved with them. Africans and Native Americans worked together, some even intermarried and had mixed children. The relationship between Africans and Native-Americans was seen as a threat to Europeans and European-Americans, who actively tried to divide Native-Americans and Africans and put them against each other.

During the 18th Century, some Native American women turned to freed or runaway African men due to a major decline in the male population in Native American villages. At the same time, the early slave population in America was disproportionately male. Records show that some Native American women bought African men as slaves. Unknown to European sellers, the women freed and married the men into their tribe. Some African men chose Native American women as their partners because their children would be free, as the child's status followed that of the mother. The men could marry into some of the matrilineal tribes and be accepted, as their children were still considered to belong to the mother's people. As European expansion increased in the Southeast, African and Native American marriages became more numerous.

From the mid 19th to the mid-20th century, many black people and ethnic Mexicans intermarried with each other in the Lower Rio Grande Valley in South Texas (mostly in Cameron County and Hidalgo County). In Cameron County, 38% of black people were interracially married (7/18 families) while in Hidalgo County the number was 72% (18/25 families). These two counties had the highest rates of interracial marriages involving at least one black spouse in the United States. The vast majority of these marriages involved black men marrying ethnic Mexican women or first generation Tejanas (Texas-born women of Mexican descent). Since ethnic Mexicans were considered white by Texas officials and the U.S. government, such marriages were a violation of the state's anti-miscegenation laws. Yet, there is no evidence that anyone in South Texas was prosecuted for violating this law. The rates of this interracial marriage dynamic can be traced back to when black men moved into the Lower Rio Grande Valley after the Civil War ended. They married into ethnic Mexican families and joined other black people who found sanctuary on the U.S.–Mexico border.

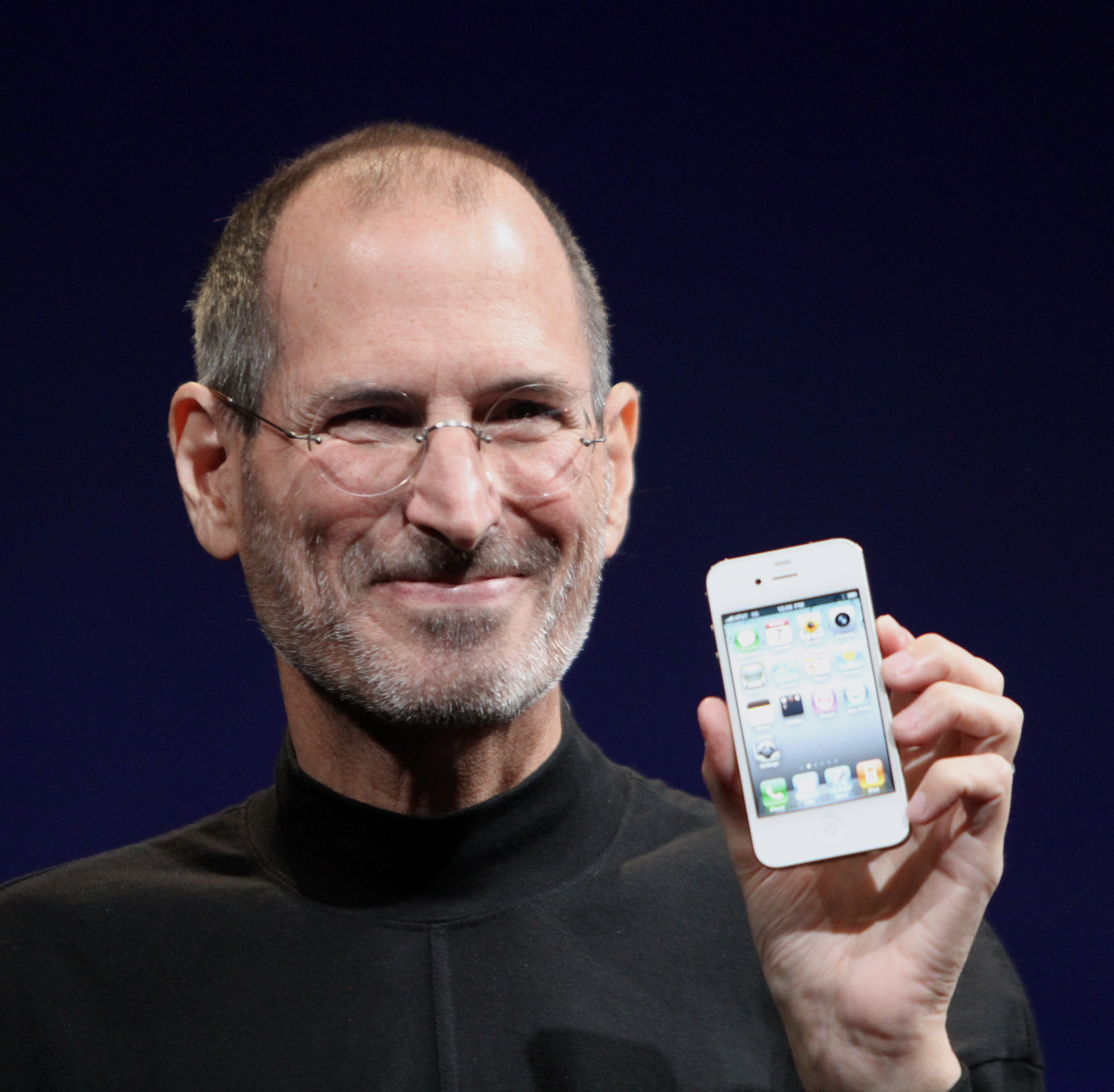
Steve Jobs was born to a Syrian father and a Swiss mother.

From the mid-19th century to the 20th century, the several hundred thousand Chinese men who migrated were almost entirely of Cantonese origin, mostly from Taishan. Anti-miscegenation laws prohibited Chinese men from marrying white women in many states. After the Emancipation Proclamation, many intermarriages in some states were not recorded and historically, Chinese American men married African American women in proportions that were higher than their total marriage numbers due to the fact that few Chinese American women lived in the United States. After the Emancipation Proclamation, many Chinese Americans migrated to the Southern United States, particularly to Arkansas, to work on plantations. For example, in 1880, the tenth US Census of Louisiana alone noted 57% of all interracial marriages were between Chinese men and black women and 43% of them were between Chinese men and white women. Between 20 and 30 percent of the Chinese who lived in Mississippi married black women before 1940. In a genetic study of 199 samples from African American males found one belong to haplogroup O2a ( or 0.5% ) It was discovered by historian Henry Louis Gates Jr. in the African American Lives documentary miniseries that NASA astronaut Mae Jemison has a significant (above 10%) genetic East Asian admixture. Gates speculated that the intermarriage/relations between migrant Chinese workers and black, or African-American slaves or ex-slaves during the 19th century might have contributed to her ethnic and genetic make-up. In the mid-1850s, 70 to 150 Chinese were living in New York City and 11 of them married Irish women. In 1906 the New York Times (6 August) reported that 300 white women (Irish American) were married to Chinese men in New York, with many more cohabiting. In 1900, based on Liang's research, of the 120,000 men in more than 20 Chinese communities in the United States, he estimated that one out of every twenty Chinese men (Cantonese) was married to a white woman. In the 1960s census showed 3500 Chinese men married to white women and 2900 Chinese women married to white men.

Before the Civil War, accusations of support for miscegenation were commonly made against Abolitionists by defenders of slavery. After the war, similar charges were made against advocates of equal rights for African Americans by white segregationists. According to these accusations, they were said to be secretly plotting the destruction of the white race through the promotion of miscegenation. In the 1950s, segregationists alleged that a Communist plot to promote miscegenation in order to hasten the takeover of the United States was being funded by the government of the Soviet Union. In 1957, segregationists cited the anti-semitic hoax A Racial Program for the Twentieth Century as a source of evidence which proved the supposed validity of these claims.

Anti-amalgamation cartoons, such as those which were published by Edward William Clay, were "elaborately exaggerated anti-abolitionist fantasies" in which black and white people were depicted as "fraternizing and socializing on equal terms." Jerome B. Holgate's A Sojourn in the City of Amalgamation "painted a future in which sexual amalgamation was in fashion."

Bob Jones University banned interracial dating until 2000.

Asians were specifically included in the anti-miscegenation laws of some states. California continued to ban Asian/white marriages until the Perez v. Sharp decision in 1948.

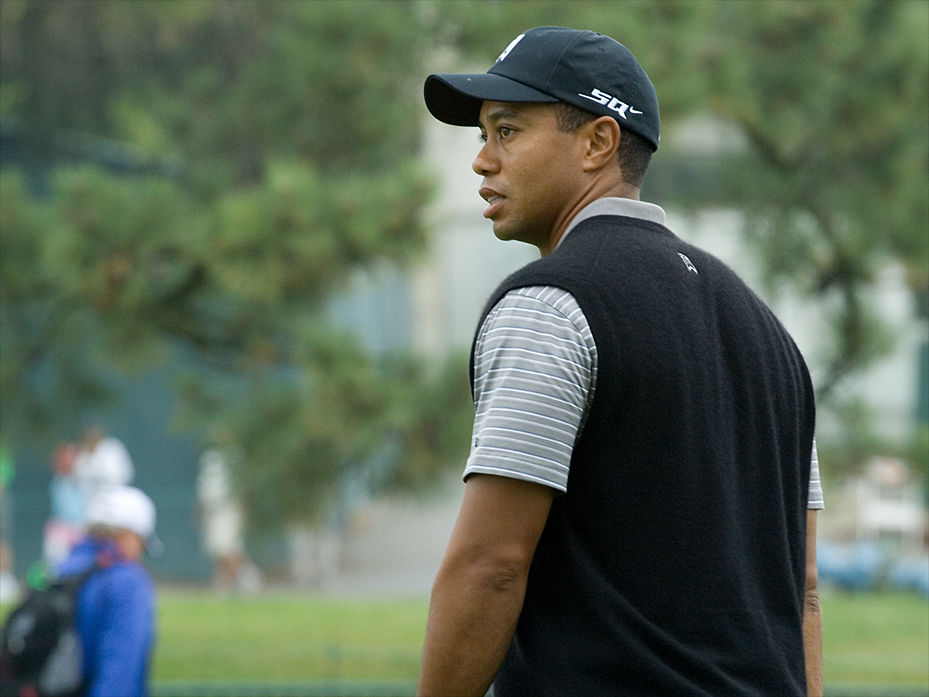
Tiger Woods refers to his ethnic make-up as "Cablinasian" (Caucasian, black, Indian and Asian) in order to describe the racial mixture which he inherited from his Thai mother and his African-American father.

In the United States, segregationists, including modern-day Christian Identity groups, have claimed that several passages in the Bible, such as the stories of Phinehas (see Phineas Priesthood), the Curse and mark of Cain, and the curse of Ham, should be understood as referring to miscegenation and they also believe that certain verses in the Bible expressly forbid it.

Interracial marriage has gained more acceptance in the United States since the civil rights movement. Approval of mixed marriages in national opinion polls has risen from 4% in 1958, 20% in 1968 (at the time of the SCOTUS decision), 36% in 1978, to 48% in 1991, 65% in 2002, 77% in 2007, and 86% in 2011. The most notable American of mixed race is the former President of the United States, Barack Obama, who is the product of a mixed marriage between a black father and a white mother. Nevertheless, as late as 2009, a Louisiana justice of the peace refused to issue a marriage license to an interracial couple, justifying the decision on grounds of concern for any future children which the couple might have. The number of interracial marriages as a proportion of new marriages has increased from 11% in 2010 to 19% in 2019.

==== Hawaii ====
Former United States President Barack Obama, born in Hawaii, is the child of an interracial couple: Barack Obama Sr. and Ann Dunham.

The majority of Hawaiian Chinese were Cantonese-speaking migrants from Guangdong but a minority of them were Hakka. If all people with Chinese ancestry in Hawaii (including the Chinese-Hawaiians) are included, they form about 1/3 of Hawaii's entire population. A large percentage of Chinese immigrants married native-Hawaiian, European, and multi-racial Hawaiians while a minority married white women in Hawaii who were of Portuguese descent^{[citation needed]}. Intermarriage started to decline in the 1920s. Portuguese Hawaiians and others of European ancestry often married Chinese immigrants and their descendants. Birth records and census data from the 1930s demonstrate that children of mixed-parentage were often classified by only their father's ethnic identity, such as with 38 recorded births in between 1932 and 1933 to Portuguese-Chinese where the father was Chinese, reflecting American attitudes on racial purity. A large amount of mingling took place between the Chinese community in Hawaii, with many Chinese-Hawaiians marrying people from the Portuguese, Spanish, Hawaiian, Caucasian-Hawaiian, and other communities. Intermarriages in Hawaii were also documented between the Chinese and Puerto Rican, Portuguese, Japanese, Greek, and mixed-race individuals.

The 12,592 Asiatic-Hawaiians enumerated in 1930 were the result of Chinese men intermarrying with Hawaiian and part Hawaiian/Europeans. Most Asiatic-Hawaiian men also married Hawaiians and European women (and vice versa). On the census, some Chinese with little "native blood" would be classified as Chinese – not as Asiatic-Hawaiians – due to "dilution of native blood".

The unions between Chinese men and Portuguese women resulted in children of mixed Chinese Portuguese parentage, called Chinese-Portuguese. For two years, to 30 June 1933, 38 of these children who were born were classified as pure Chinese because their fathers were Chinese. A large amount of intermingling took place between Chinese and Portuguese, Chinese men married Portuguese, Spanish, Hawaiian, Caucasian-Hawaiian, etc. Only one Chinese man was recorded marrying an American woman. Chinese men in Hawaii also married Puerto Rican, Italian, Japanese, and half-white women.

=== Mexico ===
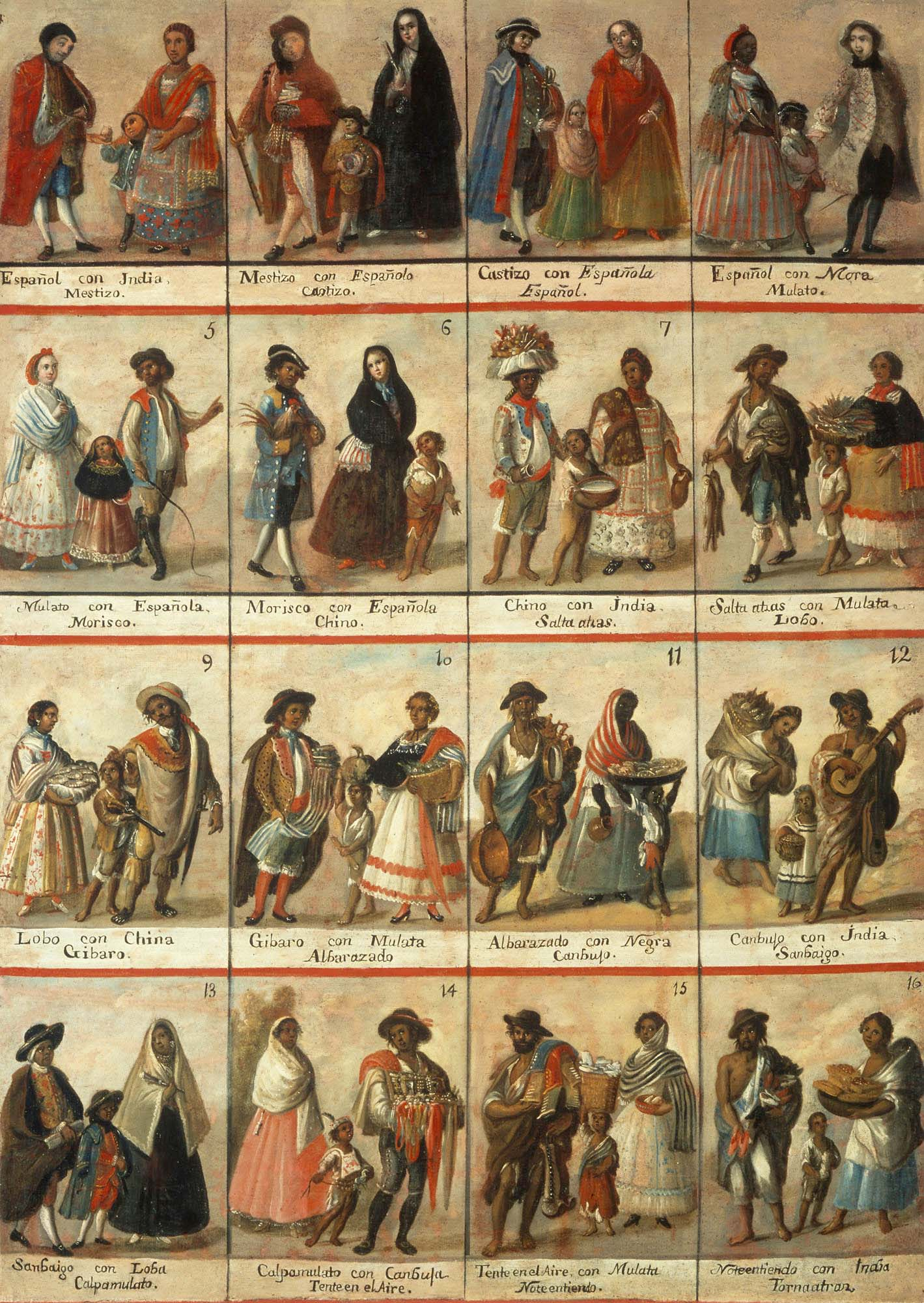
Castas painting showing the various race combinations of Colonial Mexico

In Mexico, the concept of mestizaje (or the cultural and racial amalgamation) is an integral part of the country's identity. While frequently seen as a mixture of the indigenous and Spanish, Mexico has had a notable admixture of indigenous and black Africans since the Colonial era. The Catholic Church never opposed interracial marriages, although individuals had to declare their racial classification in the parish marital register.

The Chinese who migrated to Mexico in the 19th to 20th centuries were almost entirely Chinese men. Males made up the majority of the original Chinese community in Mexico and they married Mexican women. They married Mexican women, which led to anti-Chinese prejudice; many were expelled, while those who were allowed to stay intermarried with the Mexican population. The Mexicali officials estimate was that slightly more than 2,000 are full-blooded Chinese and about 8,000 are mixed-blood Chinese-Mexicans. Other estimates claimed 50,000 residents more than thought who are of Chinese descent. 10,000 full-blooded Chinese, down from 35,000 in the 1920s. Marriage of these people to full-blooded Mexicans is diluting the community further. Chinese Mexicans in Mexicali consider themselves equally "cachanilla", a term used for locals, as any other resident of the city, even if they speak Cantonese in addition to Spanish. The sentiment against Chinese men was due to (and almost all Chinese immigrants in Mexico were men) stealing employment and Mexican women from Mexican men who had gone off to fight in the Revolution or in World War I.

=== Cuba ===
120,000 Cantonese coolies (all males) entered Cuba under contract for 80 years. Most did not marry, but Hung Hui (1975:80) states there was a frequency of sexual activity between black women and Cantonese coolies. According to Osberg, (1965:69) the Chinese often bought slave women and freed them, expressly for marriage. In the 19th and 20th centuries, Chinese men (Cantonese) engaged in sexual activity with white and black Cuban women, resulting in many children. (For a British Caribbean model of Chinese cultural retention through procreation with black women, see Patterson, 322–31). In the 1920s an additional 30000 Cantonese and small groups of Japanese arrived. Both immigrations were exclusively male, and there was rapid mingling with white, black, and mulato populations. In the CIA World Factbook: Cuba (15 May 2008) the authors estimated 114,240 people with Chinese-Cuban ancestry and only 300 pure Chinese. In the study of genetic origin, admixture, and asymmetry in maternal and paternal human lineages in Cuba, 35 Y-chromosome SNPs were typed in the 132 male individuals of the Cuban sample. The study did not include any people with some Chinese ancestry. All the samples were white and black Cubans. 2 out of 132 male samples belong to East Asian Haplogroup O2 which is found in significant frequencies among Cantonese people is found in 1.5% of Cuban population.

=== El Salvador ===
In El Salvador, there was frequent intermarriage between black male slaves and Amerindian women. Many of these slaves intermarried with Amerindian women in hopes of gaining freedom (if not for themselves, then their offspring). Many mixed African and Amerindian children resulted from these unions. The Spanish tried to prevent such Afro-Amerindian unions, but the mixing of the two groups could not be prevented. Slaves continued to pursue natives with the prospect of freedom. According to Richard Price's book Maroon Societies (1979), it is documented that during the colonial period that Amerindian women would rather marry black men than Amerindian men, and that black men would rather marry Amerindian women than black women so that their children will be born free. Price quoted this from a history by H.H. Bancroft published in 1877 referring to colonial Mexico. El Salvador's African population lived under similar circumstances, and the mixing between black men and native women was common during colonial times.

=== Guatemala ===
There were many instances when black and mulatto men would intermarry with Mayan and other native women in Guatemala. These unions were more common in some regions than others. In Escuintla (called Escuintepeque at the time), the Pipil-speaking natives who lived at higher elevations tended to live away from the lowland coastal hot lands where black and mulatto men were concentrated. Yet, as black men grew in number during this period (1671–1701), a tendency developed for them to marry native women. In Zapotitlán (also known as Suchitepéquez), Spaniards were proportionately more significant than in Escuintla. Thus the smaller African population had less opportunity for endogamy and was disappearing by the early 18th Century as blacks married Mayans and mulattoes married mestizos and lower-ranking Spaniards. Finally in Guazacapán, a Pipil district that was 10% non-native, church marriages between Mayas or Pipils and free mulattoes were rare. But black men frequently married Mayan women in informal unions, which resulted in a significant population of mestizaje here and throughout the coastal region. In the Valle de las Vacas, black male slaves also intermarried with Mayan women.

=== Costa Rica ===
The Chinese in Costa Rica originated from Cantonese male migrants. Pure Chinese make up only 1% of the Costa Rican population but, according to Jacqueline M. Newman, as much as ten percent of the people in Costa Rica are Chinese, if counting the people who are Chinese, married to a Chinese, or of mixed Chinese descent. Most Chinese immigrants since then have been Cantonese, but in the last decades of the 20th century, a number of immigrants have also come from Taiwan. Many men came alone to work, married Costa Rican women, and speak Cantonese. However, the majority of the descendants of the first Chinese immigrants no longer speak Cantonese and think of themselves as full Costa Ricans. They married Tican women (who are a blend of European, Castizo, Mestizo, Indian, Black). A Tican is also a white person with a small amount of non-white blood, like Castizo. The 1989 census shows about 98% of Costa Ricans were either White, Castizo, Mestizos, with 80% being White or Castizo. Up to the 1940s men made up the vast majority of the Costa Rican Chinese community. Males made up the majority of the original Chinese community in Mexico and they married Mexican women.

Many Africans in Costa Rica also intermarried with other races. In late colonial Cartago, 33% of 182 married African males and 7% of married African females were married to a spouse of another race. The figures were even more striking in San Jose' where 55% of the 134 married African males and 35% of the 65 married African females were married to another race (mostly mestizos). In Cartago itself, two African males were enumerated with Spanish wives and three with Indian wives, while nine African females were married to Indian males. Spaniards rarely cohabited with mulatto women except in the cattle range region bordering Nicaragua to the north. There as well, two Spanish women were living with African males.

=== Jamaica and Haiti ===
In Haiti, there is a sizable percentage within the minority who are of Asian descent. Haiti is also home to Marabou peoples, a half East Indian and half African people who descent from East Indian immigrants who arrived from other Caribbean nations, such Martinique and Guadeloupe and African slave descendants. Most present-day descendants of the original Marabou are products of hypodescent and, subsequently, mostly of African in ancestry.

The country also has a sizable Japanese and Chinese Haitian population. One of the country's most notable Afro-Asians is the late painter Edouard Wah who was born to a Chinese immigrant father and Afro-Haitian mother.

When black and Indian women had children with Chinese men the children were called chaina raial in Jamaican English. The Chinese community in Jamaica was able to consolidate because an openness to marrying Indian women was present in the Chinese since Chinese women were in short supply. Women sharing was less common among Indians in Jamaica according to Verene A. Shepherd. The small number of Indian women were fought over between Indian men and led to a rise in the amount of wife murders by Indian men. Indian women made up 11 percent of the annual amount of Indian indentured migrants from 1845 to 1847 in Jamaica. Thousands of Chinese men and Indian men married local Jamaican women. The study "Y-chromosomal diversity in Haiti and Jamaica: Contrasting levels of sex-biased gene flow" shows the paternal Chinese haplogroup O-M175 at a frequency of 3.8% in local Jamaicans (non-Chinese Jamaicans) including the Indian H-M69 (0.6%) and L-M20 (0.6%) in local Jamaicans. Among the country's most notable Afro-Asians are reggae singers Sean Paul, Tami Chynn and Diana King.

== South America ==
=== Latin America and the Caribbean ===
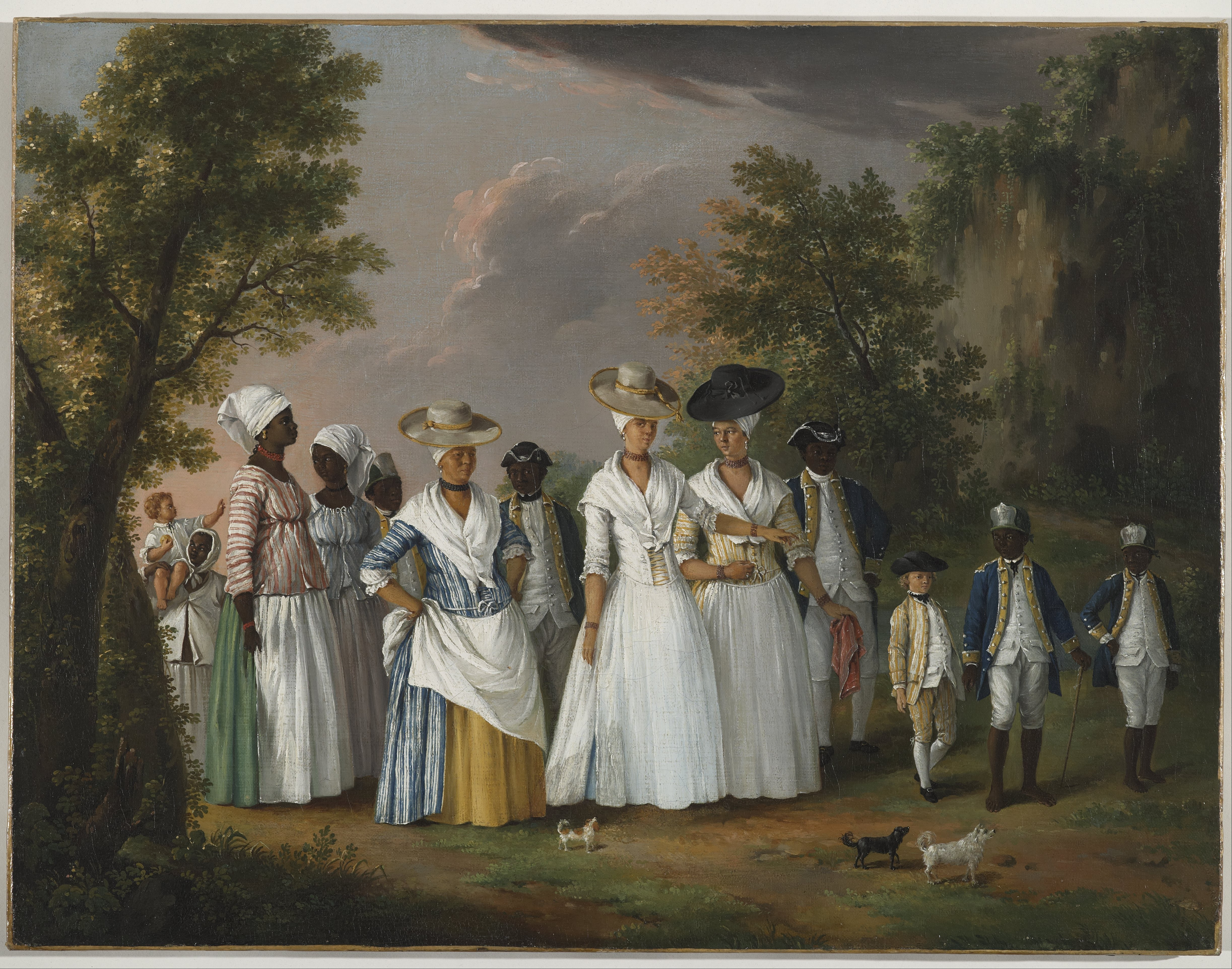
Free Women of Color with their Children and Servants, oil painting by Agostino Brunias, Dominica, c. 1764–1796

About 300,000 Cantonese coolies and migrants (almost all males) migrated during 1849–1874 to Latin America; many of them intermarried and cohabited with the Black, Mestizo, and European population of Cuba, Peru, Guyana, and Trinidad.

In addition, Latin American societies also witnessed growth in both Church-sanctioned and common law marriages between Africans and the non-colored.

=== Argentina ===
In Buenos Aires in 1810, only 2.2 percent of African men and 2.5 percent of African women were married to the non-colored (white). In 1827, the figures increased to 3.0 percent for men and 6.0 percent for women. Racial mixing increased even further as more African men began enlisting in the army. Between 1810 and 1820 only 19.9% of African men were enlisted in the army. Between 1850 and 1860, this number increased to 51.1%. This led to a sexual imbalance between African men and women in Argentina. Unions between African women and non-colored men became more common in the wake of massive Italian immigration to the country. This led one African male editorial commentator to quip that, given to the sexual imbalance in the community, black women who "could not get bread would have to settle for pasta".

=== Bolivia ===
During the colonial period, many black people often intermarried with the native population (mostly Aymara). The result of these relationships was the blending between the two cultures (Aymara and Afro-Bolivian).

After Bolivia's Agrarian Reform of 1953, black people (like indigenous people) migrated from their agricultural villages to the cities of La Paz, Cochabamba, and Santa Cruz in search of better educational and employment opportunities. Related to this, black individuals began intermarrying with people of lighter skin coloring such as blancos (whites) and mestizos. This was done as a means of better integration for themselves, and especially their children, into Bolivian society.

=== Brazil ===
Brazil is the most populated country in Latin America as well as one of the most racially diverse. According to the Brazilian Institute of Geography and Statistics (IBGE), Brazil's racial composition is 43.5% white (88.2 million) 45.3% pardo (92.1 million) 10.2% black (20.7 million), 0.8% Indigenous (1.7 million), and 0.4% yellow (850 thousand). The focus on skin color rather than racial origin is controversial. Due to its racial configuration, Brazil is often compared to the United States in terms of its race relations, however, the presence of such a strong mixed population in Brazil is cited as being one of its main differences from the United States. The most recent censure in Brazil demonstrates that a considerable part of the population is non-white. The pardo category denotes a mixed or multiracial composition. However, it could be further broken down into terms based on the main racial influences on an individual's phenotype.

Brazil's systematic collection of data on race is considered to be one of the most extensive in the region. However, the IBGE has been continuously criticized for its method of measuring racial demographics. An important distinction is that Brazil collects data based on color, not race. Thus the 'pardo' category does not actually pertain to a specific phenotype, only to the color of the individual. This means that a 'pardo' person can range from somebody with white and Amerindian ancestry to someone with African and Portuguese ancestry. There is an obvious difference between these two phenotypes that are not represented by the umbrella term of 'pardo'. There have been many studies focusing on the significance of the IBGE's focus on color rather than race. Ellis Monk has published research illustrating the implications of this racial framework on Brazilian society from a sociological perspective. In a discussion of how the government's implementation of a dichotomous white – non-white (mixed races, along with black and Amerindians) He states: "The Brazilian government, beginning in the 1990s, even led campaigns urging Brazilians to view themselves as racially dichotomous, as black or white on the basis of African ancestry, regardless of the color of their skin". This development has continued as it had gained support from Afro-Brazilians and Black consciousness movements who wished to set itself apart as a distinct race with black skin color, similar to the racial framework used in the United States.

The early stages of the Portuguese colonies in Brazilian territory fostered a mixture between Portuguese colonizers, indigenous tribes, and African slaves. This composition was common in most colonies in Latin America. In this sense, several sociologists have compared the Brazilian colonial experience to that of Mexico. Since the publishing of Gilberto Freyre's seminal work Casa-Grande & Senzala, sociologists have looked at Brazil as having a unique colonial history where interracial relations were accepted without religious or class prejudices. Freyre says:

The sentiment of nationality in the Brazilian has been deeply affected by the fact that the feudal system did not here permit of a State that was wholly dominant or a Church that was omnipotent, as well as by the circumstance of miscegenation as practiced under the wing of that system and at the same time practiced against it, thus rendering less easy the absolute identification of the ruling class with the pure or quasi-pure European stock of the principal conquerors, the Portuguese. The result is a national sentiment tempered by a sympathy for the foreigner that is so broad as to become, practically, universalism. It would, indeed, be impossible to conceive of a people marching onward toward social democracy that in place of being universal in its tendencies should be narrowly exclusive or ethnocentric.

For Freyre, lack of sexual prejudices incentivized racial mixing that produces the wide genetic variety we see today. Portuguese men married and had children with indigenous and African women. The societal consequences of this are that a marked diversification of skin colors occur, blurring the racial ancestry of those considered to have 'mixed race. The increase of influence of one race over another in producing a Brazilian phenotype happened in stages. For example, immigration policy loosened in the late 1940s resulting in the influx of multiple European communities that are now considered to have 'whitened' Brazilian communities in the north and northeast.

=== British West Indies ===
Miscegenation has never been illegal in the British West Indies, and the populations of Guyana, Belize, Jamaica, and Trinidad are today among the world's most diverse.

=== Guyana ===
Many Portuguese men intermarried Creole women. Their children easily merged with rest of the Creole population. Many Chinese men also intermarried or established sexual relationships with Creole women. At the beginning, interracial marriage with Chinese men was not common. In the 1870s it was viewed more negatively than Portuguese men marrying Creole women, so that the Chinese population remained mostly racially pure. Chinese men having interracial marriages became increasingly more common. The significant changes in how Creole women began to view Chinese men as desirable partners led to an increase in intermarriage. Due to the scarcity of Chinese women, Kirke in 1897 had observed that Chinese males in Guyana like to either mix with Creole women, and have the prettiest coloured women as concubines. As a result of continued intermixing, 80% of the Chinese-Guyana look scarcely Chinese with only few characteristics facial features of Chinese.

In Guyana, immigrant Chinese men established sexual relations with local Indian and Creole women due to the lack of Chinese women migrating to British Guiana. Creole sexual relationships and marriages with Chinese and Indians was rare. However, more common was Indian women and Chinese men establishing sexual relations with each other and some Chinese men took their Indian wives back with them to China. In Guyana, while marriages between Indian women and black African men is socially shameful to Indians, Chinese-Indian marriages are considered acceptable as reported by Joseph Nevadomsky in 1983. "Chiney-dougla" is the Indian Guyanese term for mixed Chinese-Indian children. Some Indian women in Guiana had multiple partners due to the greater number of men than women, an account of the era told by women in British Guiana is of a single Chinese man who was allowed to temporarily borrow a Hindu Indian woman by her Indian husband who was his friend, so the Chinese man could sire a child with her, after a son was born to her the Chinese man kept the boy while she was returned to her Indian husband, the boy was named William Adrian Lee. An Indian woman named Mary See married a Chinese man surnamed Wu in Goedverwagting and founded their own family after he learned how to process sugar cane.

In British Guiana, the Chinese did not maintain their distinctive physical features due to the high rate of Chinese men marrying people other ethnicities like Indian women. The severe imbalance with Indian men outnumbering Indian women led some women to take advantage of the situation to squeeze favors from men and leave their partners for other men, one infamous example was a pretty, light skinned, Christian Indian woman named Mary Ilandun with ancestral origins from Madras, born in 1846, who had sex with Indian, black, and Chinese men as she married them in succession and ran off with their money to her next paramour, doing this from 1868 to 1884. Indian men used force to bring Indian women back in line from this kind of behavior. The most severe lack of women in all the peoples of British Guiana was with the Chinese and this led Europeans to believe that Chinese did not engage in wife murders while wife murders was something innate to Indian men, and unlike Indian coolie women, Chinese women were viewed as chaste. Chinese women were not indentured and since they did not need to work, they avoided prospective men seeking relationships, while the character of Indian women was disparaged as immoral and their alleged sexual looseness was blamed for their deaths in the "wife murders" by Indian men. The sex ratio of Indian men to Indian women was 100:63 while the sex ratio of Chinese men to Chinese women was 100:43 in British Guiana in 1891.

Over time, although there were more Creole marriages with Chinese, there was also small growth of Indian marriages with Chinese and it was reported that "It is not an uncommon thing to find a cooly woman living with a Chinaman as his wife, and in one or two instances the woman has accompanied her reputed husband to China." by Dr. Comins in 1891, with six Indian women marrying Chinese men in just the year of 1892 alone, as reported by The Immigration Report for 1892.

=== Trinidad ===
According to the 1931 census, 1,713 persons were born to Indian fathers only, and 805 were born to Indian mothers only (Kuczynski 1953). The race of the other parent is not indicated. The 1946 census registers the presence of 8,406 East Indian Creoles who are defined as "persons of mixed East Indian origin, on the whole people who had an East Indian father or an East Indian mother only" (Kuczynski 339). Harewood (1975) notes that these 8,406 were included in the category "Mixed" together with 70,369 mulattoes and other people of mixed racial ancestry.

In Trinidad, some Chinese men had sexual relations Indian Asian unskilled women, siring children with them, and it was reported that "A few children are to be met with born of Madras and Creole parents and some also of Madras and Chinese parents – the Madrasee being the mother", by the missionary John Morton in 1876, Morton noted that it seemed strange since there were more Indian unskilled men than Indian unskilled women that Indian unskilled women would marry Chinese men, but claimed it was most likely because the Chinese could provide amenities to the women since the Chinese owned shops and they were enticed by these. Indian women were married by indentured Chinese men in Trinidad. Few Chinese women migrated to Trinidad while the majority of Chinese migrants were men. The migration of Chinese to Trinidad resulted in intermarriage between them and others. Chinese in Trinidad became relatively open to having marital relations with other races and Indian women began having families with Chinese in the 1890s.

The situation in Trinidad and British Guiana with Indian women being fewer than Indian men led to Indian women using the situation to their advantage by leaving their partners for other men, leading to a high incidence of "wife murders" by Indian men on their wives, and Indian women and culture were branded as "immoral" by European observers, an Indian man named Mohammad Orfy petitioned as a representative of "destitute Indian men of Trinidad", to the colonial authorities, complaining of Indian women's behavior and claiming that it was "a perforating plague...the high percentage of immoral lives led by the female section of our community...to satisfy the greed and lust of the male section of quite a different race to theirs...[Indian women] are enticed, seduced and frightened into becoming concubines, and paramours...[Indian women] have absolutely no knowledge whatsoever of the value of being in virginhood...most shameless and a perfect menace to the Indian gentry." with him naming specific peoples, claiming that Indian women were having sex with Chinese men, Americans, Africans, and Europeans, saying "Africans, Americans and Chinese in goodly numbers are enticing the females of India, who are more or less subtle to lustful traps augured through some fear of punishment being meted out if not readily submissive as requested."

The situation on Trinidad enabled unprecedented autonomy in the sexual activities of Indian women and freedom. The 1916 "Peition of Indentured Labourers in Trinidad" complained that: "Is it permissible for a male member of the Christian faith to keep a Hindoo or Muslim female as his paramour or concubine? Is this not an act of sacrilege and a disgraceful scandal according to the Christian faith to entice and encourage Indian females to lead immoral lives?" Indian men used violence against Indian women in response to Indian women engaging in sexual relations with multiple men due to the shortage of them in Trinidad. On plantations white European managers took advantage of and use indentured Indian woman for sex, in addition, English, Portuguese, and Chinese men were also in sexual relationships with Indian women as noted by Attorney General W.F. Haynes Smith, while Creole women were abhorred or ignored by Indian men. Approval of interracial marriage has slowly increased in Trinidad and Tobago and one Chinese man reported that his Indian wife did not encounter any rejection from his parents when asked in a survey. In Trinidad Europeans and Chinese are seen as acceptable marriage partners by Indians while marrying black men would lead to rejection of their daughters by Indian families.

In British Guiana and Trinidad, white overseers and managers would take advantage of Indian unskilled women and use them in sexual relationships, the Indian women were then blamed for these incidents and viewed as allegedly "loose" and promiscuous by colonial officials, and Indian women were subjected to a high rate of "wife murders" by Indian men, the Indian women were also blamed for this due to their "inconstancy" due to alleged low "sexual morality". In one incident in Trinidad, seven Indian women were impregnated at the same time by an estate manager in 1854. The managers sexual relations with Indian women caused riots, at the most significant one, at the hands of the police, 59 Indians were wounded and 5 Indians were killed, in Non Pareil in 1896, due to an Indian woman cohabiting with Gerad Van Nooten, the acting manager. The low ratio of Indian women compared to Indian men, along with the factor of Portuguese, white overseers and managers, and Chinese men having sexual relations with Indian women, aggravated the problem of rivalry for Indian women between Indian men, and drove up the value of Indian women. The incidents of overseers and managers taking sexual advantage of the women laborers led to Indian laborers causing stoppages and protests. In British Guiana the overseers and managers sexual abuse of Indian women caused Indian workers to embark on a "struggle" from 1869 to 1872. Conflicts due to women led to attacks against drivers and overseers. The resentment of the workers was aggravated by the use of women on estates for sexual relations.

The deficit in Indian women compared to men was caused by the recruitment quota ratio of 100 men to 40 women, most of the women were young and single, and the shortage of Indian women for Indian men was aggravated when Indian women were taken by Africans and European overseers, leading to high amounts of wife murders against Indian women by Indian men and a decrease in morals. The appropriation of Indian women by Europeans and Africans added up to the resentment which contributed to violence against Indian women by Indian men. Indian women on plantations took part in the struggle against Africans and European authorities who were sexually using them. Indian nationalists ashamed of the sexual reputation of Indian unskilled women often attacked the Asian unskilled trade for that reason instead of other reasons such as bad working conditions. Overseers and planters on the plantations and sailors and doctors on board the ships transporting Indian unskilled women would try to obtain sex from Indian women. The Indian women had a sexual bargaining chip since they could frequently change lovers due to the fact that there were less Indian women than men, The Daily Chronicle described Indian unskilled women as "pretty and youthful", laborers had to be moved around plantations by managers to prevent men from killing their adulterous wives, and the aura surrounding the sexuality and perils of Indian unskilled women was enhanced by the widespread worship of the goddess Kali by them. Riots and murders were blamed on the sexual liaisons between white overseers, managers and Indian unskilled women in addition to their constant changing of sexual partners and the sexuality of unskilled women were viewed shamefully as a deviation of the expected behavior of Indian women. The Guyanese-Indian journalist Gaiutra Bahadur wrote about the experiences of Indian unskilled women. Sex was utilized as a potent instrument by Indian unskilled women such as when they obtained favors from overseers by having sex with them, and the women could either have been "imperiled" or "empowered" when forming sexual relations with overseers. The Indian unskilled women both had sexual advantages due to being less in number and suffered from sexual exploitation, in total, around 250,000 Indian women migrated as coolies.

Gaiutra Bahadur said in an interview that some Guyanese from her community were angered by her book and writing on the sexual experiences of the Indian coolie woman, with one saying "Who is that woman who's been writing that all of our grandmothers and great-grandmothers were prostitutes?", and another saying "One must be careful." to her, viewing her book as an attack on the honor and morals of Indian women, Bahadur maintained that she was trying to bring back the "dignity" of the women and that Indian women's honor was attacked in the same way by colonial officials who blamed the women themselves for their sexual liaisons rather than flaws in the plantation and indenture systems.

A stereotype of an uncontrollable sexual libido was attributed to Indian women in the Caribbean and they were described as having "white liver" because of this. Sexual abuse, poor living standards, and tough work were all things Indian unskilled women had to contend with. In seeking potential mates the Indian unskilled women has some amount of free choice due to their scarce numbers, some of them were able to end their indenture when married by white overseers. There were cases of sexual abuse of Indian women on the ships and one man prostituted his 8-year-old daughter, and in another case a British surgeon married a young widow, the women obtained an advantage in sexual relations from being less numerous than men but this led to a large amount of killings called "wife murders" of the women by men they rejected. Postcards were made of Indian unskilled women and girls bedecked in jewelry made of gold and silver such as bangles and nose rings which seemed to be aiming to show them as wealthy and pretty. Indian unskilled women wore their wealth in the form of jewellery, like bangles and nose rings. In Port of Spain in Trinidad, Chinese unskilled people were described as going about almost naked while Indian unskilled women wore "scanty drapery" and had "arms and ankles covered with bangles". One Indian woman on the way to Guiana had to be given jewelry like bangles made of silver and nose rings made of gold to by her husband in order to make her not leave him.

=== Peru ===
About 100,000 Chinese coolies (almost all males) from 1849 to 1874 migrated to Peru and intermarried with Peruvian women of Mestizo, European, Amerindian, European/Mestizo, African and mulatto origin. Thus, many Peruvian Chinese today are of mixed Chinese, Spanish, African, or Amerindian ancestry. One estimate for the Chinese-Peruvian mixture is about 1.3–1.6 million. Asian Peruvians are estimated to be 3% of the population, but one source places the number of citizens with some Chinese ancestry at 4.2 million, which equates to 15% of the country's total population. In Peru, non-Chinese women married the mostly male Chinese coolies.

Interracial marriages between Cantonese-Chinese males and Peruvian females was quite large resulting in large number of mixed children's and people with some Chinese ancestry in Peru. There is no prevailing racist attitude against intermarriage between the Chinese and non-Chinese in Peru, so the number of interracial marriages is quite large. According to one source, the number of mix raced children born was 180,000. Half of that number was in Lima alone, with the ratio between Chinese mestizo and the full-blooded Chinese at 90,000 to 15,000 (6:1). There is estimated up to 2.5 million (up to 8% of Peru) citizens are of mixed Chinese-Peruvian ancestry known as 'Tusans'. One estimates puts 4.2 million (15%) of the Peruvians having some Chinese ancestry.

Among the Chinese migrants who went to Peru and Cuba there were almost no women. Many Peruvian women of different origins married to these Chinese male migrants. Most of the women that married Chinese are Native Indians (including Mestiza) and Black. Some lower class white women also married Chinese men but in a lower ratio. Chinese had contact with Peruvian women in cities, there they formed relationships during their labor as coolies and sired mixed babies, these women originated from Andean and coastal areas and did not originally come from the cities, in the haciendas on the coast in rural areas, native young women of indígenas (native) and serranas (mountain) origin from the Andes mountains would come down to work, these Andean native women were favored as marital partners by Chinese men over Africans, with matchmakers arranging for communal marriages of Chinese men to indígenas and serranas young women. There was a racist reaction by Peruvians to the marriages of Peruvian women and Chinese men. When native Peruvian women (cholas et natives, Indias, indígenas) and Chinese men had mixed children, the children were called injerto and once these injertos emerged, Chinese men then sought out girls of injertas origins as marriage partners, children born to black mothers were not called injertos. Lower-class Peurvians established sexual unions or marriages with the Chinese men and some black and Indian women "bred" with the Chinese according to Alfredo Sachettí, who claimed the mixing was causing the Chinese to suffer from "progressive degeneration", in Casa Grande highland Indian women and Chinese men participated in communal "mass marriages" with each other, arranged when highland women were brought by a Chinese matchmaker after receiving a down payment.

In Peru and Cuba some Indian (Native American), mulatto, black, and white women married or had sexual relations with Chinese men, with marriages of mulatto, black, and white woman being reported by the Cuba Commission Report and in Peru it was reported by the New York Times that Peruvian black and Indian (Native) women married Chinese men to their own advantage and to the disadvantage of the men since they dominated and "subjugated" the Chinese men despite the fact that the labor contract was annulled by the marriage, reversing the roles in marriage with the Peruvian woman holding marital power, ruling the family and making the Chinese men slavish, docile, "servile", "submissive" and "feminine" and commanding them around, reporting that "Now and then ... he [the Chinese man] becomes enamored of the charms of some sombre-hued chola (Native Indian and mestiza woman) or samba (a mixed black woman), and is converted and joins the Church, so that may enter the bonds of wedlock with the dusky señorita." Chinese men were sought out as husbands and considered a "catch" by the "dusky damsels" (Peruvian women) because they were viewed as a "model husband, hard-working, affectionate, faithful and obedient" and "handy to have in the house", the Peruvian women became the "better half" instead of the "weaker vessel" and would command their Chinese husbands "around in fine style" instead of treating them equally, while the labor contract of the Chinese coolie would be nullified by the marriage, the Peruvian wife viewed the nullification merely as the previous "master" handing over authority over the Chinese man to her as she became his "mistress", keeping him in "servitude" to her, speedily ending any complaints and suppositions by the Chinese men that they would have any power in the marriage.

=== Venezuela ===
Marriages between Europeans, Mestizos, Amerindians, and Africans was not uncommon in the past. Several thousand Chinese from Enping resided in the country. The Chinese were still largely viewed as a foreign population who married foreign brides but seldom integrated into Venezuelan society.

== Asia ==
Inter-ethnic marriages in Southeast Asia have deep historical roots, beginning with Indian traders intermarrying with local populations from the 1st century onwards, resulting in the rise of Indianized kingdoms. From the 9th century, Arab traders also settled in the region, marrying local women and spreading Islam. This pattern of intermarriage continued with Chinese, Indian, and Arab traders during the 14th to 17th centuries, as well as Portuguese and Japanese traders.

In China, inter-ethnic relationships were initially discouraged, but Persian women were present in Guangzhou from the 10th to 12th centuries, becoming part of the local community. The Ming dynasty enforced intermarriage between Central Asian, Mongol, and Chinese populations to ensure integration. This trend of intermarriage included Tibetan, Uyghur, and later Russian-Chinese unions, which were encouraged for perceived genetic benefits.

During the Vietnam War, numerous Amerasians were born from relationships between American soldiers and Vietnamese women, with estimates of their numbers ranging from 15,000 to 30,000. World War II also saw Japanese soldiers engaging in sexual violence across East and Southeast Asia, resulting in mixed-race offspring. Post-war, sex tourism became prevalent, particularly in Bali, where local men formed relationships with female tourists from various countries.

In Central and South Asia, inter-ethnic marriages were common, with Central Asians descending from a mix of Mongols, Turks, and Iranians. The Hazara people of Afghanistan have Mongolian ancestry due to Turco-Mongol invasions. India saw significant intermarriage, especially in Goa, with Portuguese men marrying Indian women. The Anglo-Indian community emerged from British-Indian unions, which declined post-1857 rebellion due to anti-miscegenation laws.

== Europe ==
=== Germany ===
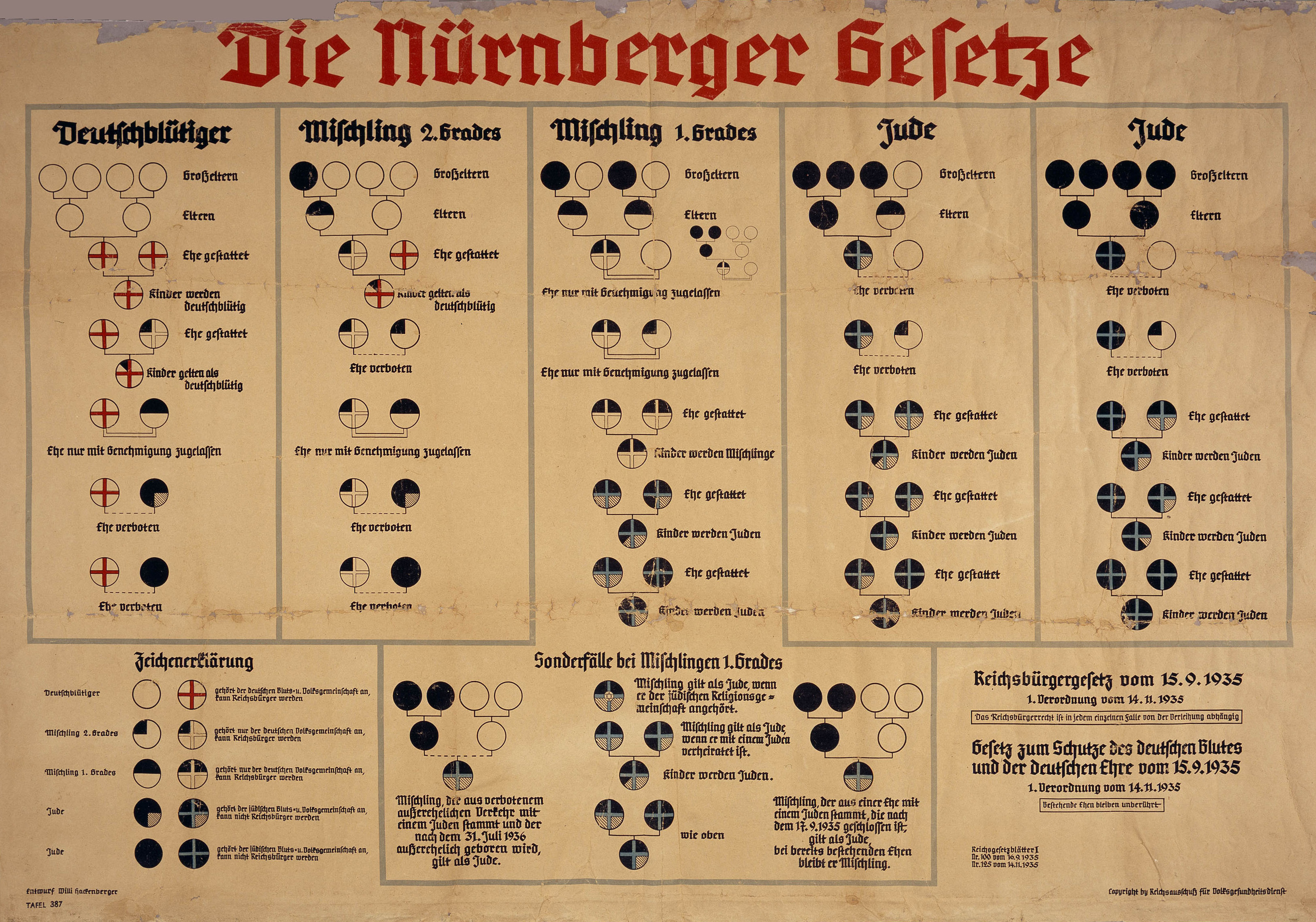
Chart used to explain the Nuremberg race laws

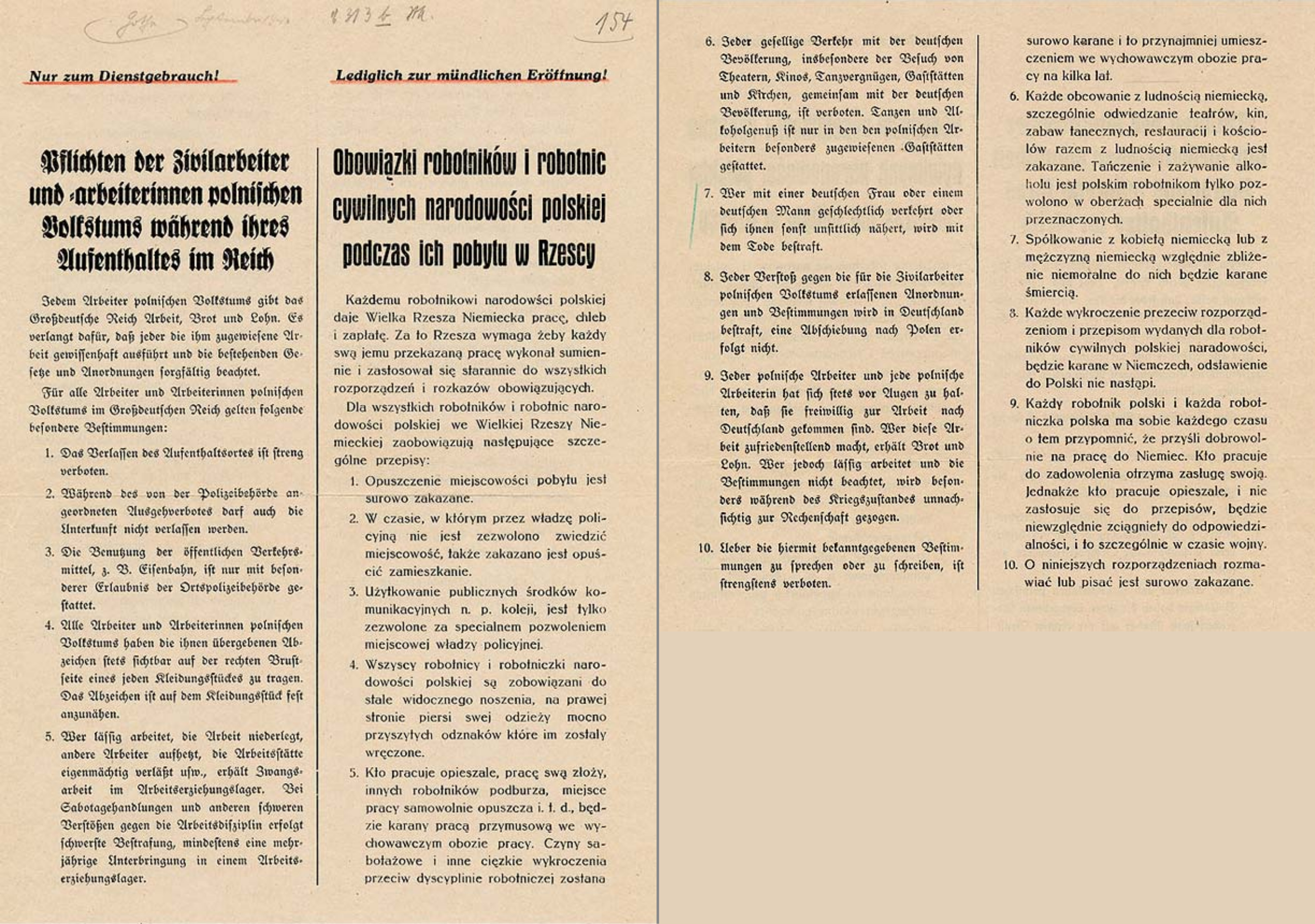
1940 poster in German and Polish describing "Obligations of Polish workers in Germany" including death sentence to every man and woman from Poland for sex with a German

In 1905 the local colonial administration banned civil marriages of "mixed" couples in German South West Africa. Three years later, all "mixed marriages" that had been contracted before 1905 were annulled retrospectively.

During the years which followed World War I, the French Army occupied the Rhineland, utilizing African soldiers amongst their forces. Their children were known as "Rhineland Bastards".

Beginning in 1933, the Nazis declared that the Jews were a group of people who were bound to form a unit by their close, so-called genetic (blood) ties, a unit which a non-Jew could never join or secede from. The Nazis declared that the influence of Jews was detrimental in Germany, in order to justify the discrimination and persecution which they were then subjecting Germany's Jews to. In order to be spared from the discrimination and persecution, a person needed to prove his or her affiliation with the Aryan race, as it was conceived by the Nazis.

It was paradoxical that neither genetic tests nor allegedly outwardly racial features in a person's physiognomy determined his or her racial affiliation, although the Nazis talked a lot about physiognomy, but only the records of the religious affiliations of a person's grandparents decided it. While a person's grandparents had previously been able to choose their religion, in the Nazi era, he or she would compulsorily be categorized as a Jew and persecuted, even if his or her grandparents had originally practiced Judaism but later converted to another religion, thus, if three or four grandparents had been enrolled as members of a Jewish congregation, their grandchildren would be considered Jews and persecuted, regardless of whether they were considered Jews according to the Halachah (roughly meaning: they were Jewish by birth from a Jewish mother or they were Jewish by conversion), apostates, irreligionists or Christians.

The Nuremberg Laws of 1935 forbade marriages between persons who were considered racially superior, so-called Aryans, and persons who were considered racially inferior, so-called non-Aryans; these laws forbade all marriages in which at least one partner was a German citizen. Non-Aryans mostly consisted of Jewish Germans and Gentile Germans who were of Jewish descent. The official definition of "Aryan" classified all non-Jewish Europeans as Aryans, sexual relations between Aryans and non-Aryans now became punishable as Rassenschande (race defilement).

Eventually, children—whenever they were born—within a mixed marriage, as well as children who were born as a result of extramarital mixed relationships before 31 July 1936, were considered Mischlinge or crossbreeds and discriminated against. However, children who were later born to mixed parents, parents who were not yet married when the Nuremberg Laws were passed, were considered Geltungsjuden and discriminated against, even if the parents had gotten married abroad or remained unmarried. Eventually, children who were enrolled in a Jewish congregation were also considered Geltungsjuden and discriminated against.

Geltungsjuden were subjected to varying degrees of forced labour in 1940, an order which was partially imposed on all Jewish-classified spouses, the only Jewish-classified spouses who were exempted from this order were Jewish-classified husbands and Jewish-classified wives who were taking care of their minor children. According to the documents, no mixed couples were ever exempted from persecution, this was especially the case with Jewish-classified spouses.

Systematic deportations of Jewish Germans and Gentile Germans of Jewish descent started on 18 October 1941. In fact, German Jews and German Gentiles of Jewish descent who were living in mixed marriages were mostly spared from deportation. In the event that a mixed marriage ended with the death of the so-called Aryan spouse or the divorce of the Jewish-classified spouse, the Jewish-classified spouse who was residing within Germany was usually deported soon afterward, this was not the case if the couple still had minor children who were not considered Geltungsjuden.

In March 1943, an attempt to deport the Berlin-based Jews and Gentiles of Jewish descent who were living in non-privileged mixed marriages failed due to public protest by their in-laws who were of so-called Aryan kinship (see Rosenstraße protest). Also, the Aryan-classified husbands and the Mischling-classified children (starting at the age of 16) who were born as a result of their mixed marriages were taken for forced labour by the Organisation Todt, starting in the autumn of 1944.

The last attempt, undertaken in February/March 1945, ended because the extermination camps were already liberated. However, 2,600 people were deported to Theresienstadt from all over the Reich, most of them survived the last months of the war and lived to see their liberation.

After the war began, the race defilement law was extended to all foreigners. The Gestapo harshly persecuted sexual relations between Germans and workers from Eastern Europe on the grounds of "risk for the racial integrity of the German nation". A decree dated on 7 December 1942 stated any "unauthorized sexual intercourse" would result in the death penalty. Foreign workers who were brought to Nazi Germany were considered a threat to people of German blood. Polish workers and Eastern Workers who had sexual relations with a German were punished with the death penalty. During the war, hundreds of Polish, Belarusian, Ukrainian and Russian men were executed for their relations with German women.

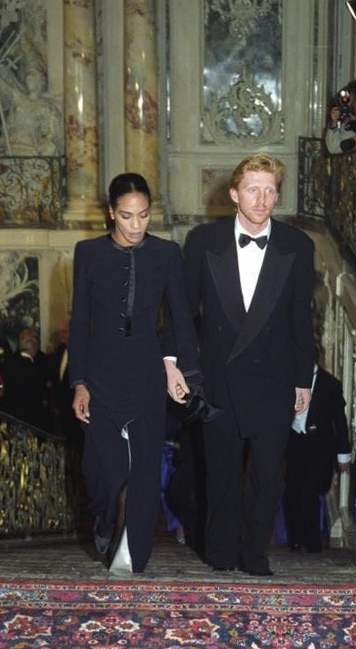
Boris Becker with Barbara Feltus in 1992

With the defeat of Nazi Germany in 1945, the laws which banned so-called mixed marriages were lifted. If couples who had already lived together during the Nazi era had remained unmarried due to the legal restrictions then got married after the war, their date of marriage was legally retroactively backdated if they wished it to be the date when they formed a couple. Even if one spouse was already dead, the marriage could be retroactively recognised. In the West German Federal Republic of Germany 1,823 couples applied for recognition, which was granted in 1,255 cases.

=== France ===
During the early 20th century, some Vietnamese men married French women, but most of the time had to hide their relationships through casual sexual encounters, brothels and workplaces. According to official records in 1918, of the Vietnamese men and French women, 250 had married officially and 1363 couples were living together without the approval of the French parental consent and without the approval of French authorities.

=== Hungary ===
The Avars, Central Asian nomads who during the late 6th and 7th centuries had formed Avar Khaganate largely inhabited by conquered Slavs, used their wives and daughters as concubines.

Each year, the Huns [Avars] came to the Slavs, to spend the winter with them; then they took the wives and daughters of the Slavs and slept with them, and among the other mistreatments [already mentioned] the Slavs were also forced to pay levies to the Huns. But the sons of the Huns, who were [then] raised with the wives and daughters of these Wends [Slavs] could not finally endure this oppression anymore and refused obedience to the Huns and began, as already mentioned, a rebellion.

— Chronicle of Fredegar, Book IV, Section 48, written circa 642

The Hungarians are thought to have originated in an ancient Finno-Ugric population that originally inhabited the forested area between the Volga River and the Ural Mountains. At the time of the Magyar migration in the 10th century, the present-day Hungary was inhabited by Slavs, numbering about 200,000, who were either assimilated or enslaved by the Magyars.

During the Russian campaign in the 13th century, the Mongols drove some 40,000 Cuman families, a nomadic tribe, west of the Carpathian Mountains. The Iranian Jassic people came to Hungary together with the Cumans after they were defeated by the Mongols. Over the centuries they were fully assimilated into the Hungarian population. Rogerius of Apulia, an Italian monk who witnessed and survived the First Mongol invasion of Hungary, pointed out that the Mongols "found pleasure" in humiliating local women.

Starting in 1938, Hungary under Miklós Horthy passed a series of anti-Jewish measures in the emulation of Germany's Nuremberg Laws. The first, promulgated on 29 May 1938, restricted the number of Jews in each commercial enterprise, in the press, among physicians, engineers and lawyers to twenty percent. The second anti-Jewish law (5 May 1939), for the first time, defined Jews racially: people with 2, 3 or 4 Jewish-born grandparents were declared Jewish. Their employment in government at any level was forbidden, they could not be editors at newspapers, their numbers were restricted to six per cent among theater and movie actors, physicians, lawyers, and engineers. Private companies were forbidden to employ more than 12% Jews. 250,000 Hungarian Jews lost their income. Most of them lost their right to vote as well: before the second Jewish law, about 31% of the Jewish population of Borsod county (Miskolc excluded), 2496 people had this right. At the next elections, less than a month after this new anti-Jewish legislation, only 38 privileged Jews could vote.

=== Southwestern Europe ===
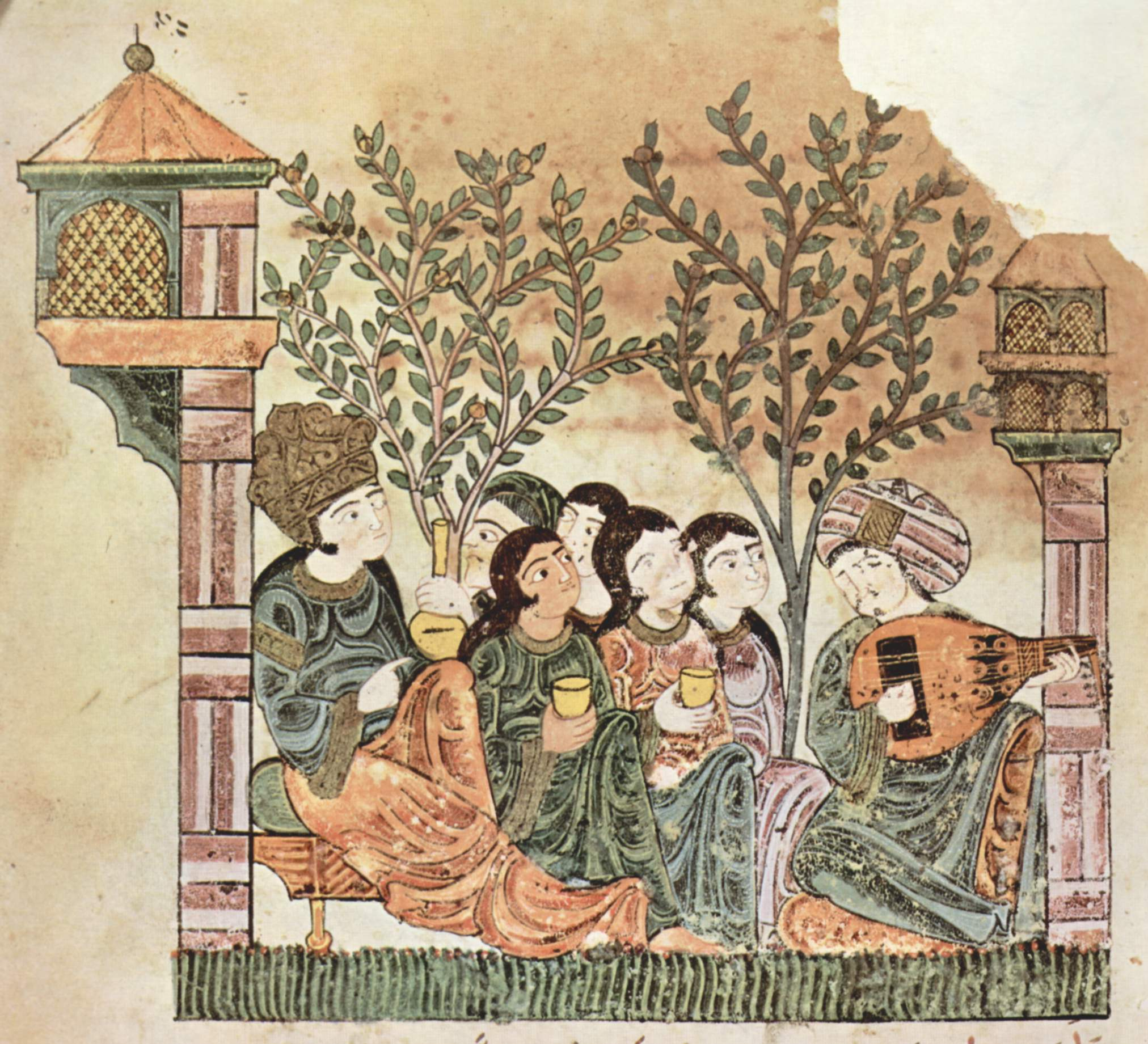
Hadith Bayad wa Riyad (12th century) was an Arabic love story about an Andalusian female and a foreign Damascene male.

In ancient history, the Iberian Peninsula was frequently invaded by foreigners who intermarried with the native population. One of the earliest foreign groups to arrive in the region were the Indo-European Celts who intermarried with the pre-Indo-European Iberians in prehistoric Iberia creating Celtiberians. They were later followed by the Semitic Phoenicians and Carthaginians and the Indo-European Romans who intermarried with the pre-Roman peoples of the Iberian Peninsula during Classical Antiquity. During the Islamic period from the 8th to 14th centuries and in the early modern era, minorities of north African origin resided in Portugal and southern Spain and interracial marriage was especially prevalent.^{(citation needed)}

They were in turn followed by the Germanic Visigoths, Suebi and Vandals and the Iranian Sarmatians and Alans who also intermarried with the local population in Hispania during late Antiquity. In the 6th century, the region of Spania was reconquered by the Byzantine Empire (Eastern Roman Empire), when Byzantine Greeks also settled there, before the region was lost again to the Visigothic Kingdom less than a century later.

The offspring of marriages between Arabs and non-Arabs in Iberia (Berbers or local Iberians) were known as Muladi or Muwallad, an Arabic term still used in the modern Arab world to refer to people with Arab fathers and non-Arab mothers. Some sources consider this term the origin for the Spanish word Mulatto. However, the Real Academia Española does not endorse such etymology. This is because the term was mainly used during the time period of al-Andalus to refer to local Iberians (Christians and pagans) who converted to Islam or whose ancestors had converted. An example is the Banu Qasi, a Muslim dynasty of Basque origin. In addition, many Muladi were also descended from Saqaliba (Slavic) slaves taken from Eastern Europe via the Arab slave trade. Collectively, Christian Europeans named all the Muslims of Iberia, "Moors", regardless of ethnic origin.

After the Reconquista, which was completed in 1492, most of the Moors were forced to either flee to Islamic territories or convert to Christianity. The ones who converted to Christianity were known as Moriscos, and they were often persecuted by the Spanish Inquisition as suspects of heresy on the basis of the Limpieza de sangre ("Cleanliness of blood") doctrine, under which anti-miscegenation laws were implemented in the Iberian Peninsula.

Anyone whose ancestors had miscegenated with the Moors or Jews were suspected of secretly practicing Islam or Judaism, so were often particularly monitored by the Inquisition. The claim to universal hidalguía (lowest nobility) of the Basques was justified by erudites like Manuel de Larramendi (1690–1766) because the Arab invasion had not reached the Basque territories, so it was believed that Basques had maintained their original purity, while the rest of Spain was suspect of miscegenation. Hidalguía helped many Basques to official positions in the administration. In December 2008, a genetic study of the current population of the Iberian Peninsula, published in the American Journal of Human Genetics, estimated that about 10% have North African ancestors and 20% have Sephardi Jews as ancestors. Since there is no direct link between genetic makeup and religious affiliation, however, it is difficult to draw direct conclusions between their findings and forced or voluntary conversion. Nevertheless, the Sephardic result is in contradiction or not replicated in all the body of genetic studies done in Iberia and has been later questioned by the authors themselves and by Stephen Oppenheimer who estimates that much earlier migrations, 5000 to 10,000 years ago from the Eastern Mediterranean might also have accounted for the Sephardic estimates: "They are really assuming that they are looking at his migration of Jewish immigrants, but the same lineages could have been introduced in the Neolithic". The rest of genetic studies done in Spain estimate the North African contribution ranging from 2.5/3.4% to 7.7%.

=== Italy ===
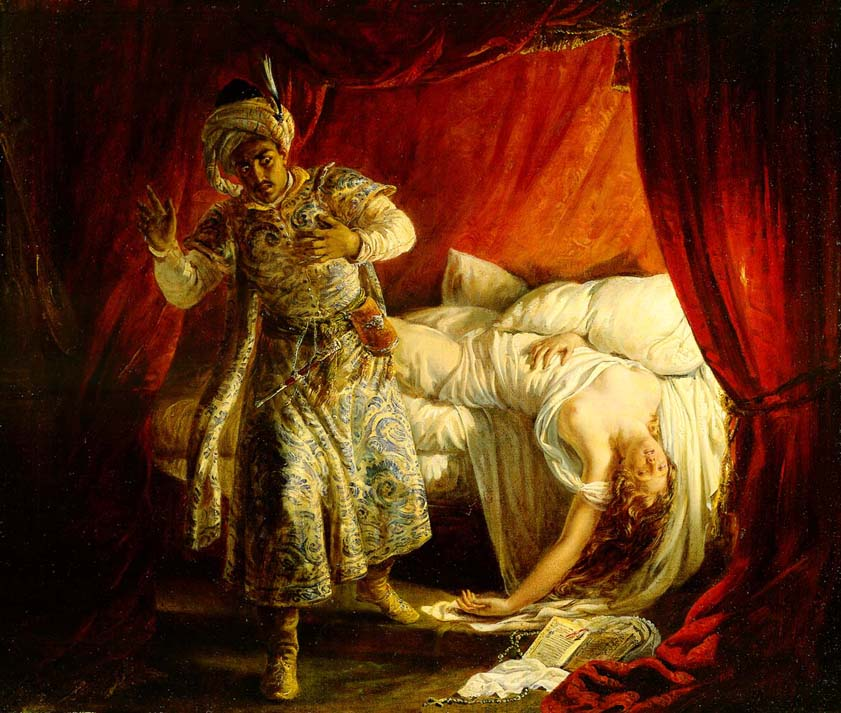
Othello and Desdemona, a painting by Alexandre-Marie Colin in 1829

As was the case in other areas occupied by Muslims, it was acceptable in Islamic marital law for a Muslim male to marry Christian and Jewish females in southern Italy when under Islamic rule – namely, the Emirate of Sicily between the 9th and 11th centuries; and, of least importance, the short-lived Emirate of Bari between 847 and 871. In this case, most intermarriages were between Arab and Berber males from North Africa and the local Greek, Roman and Italian females. Such intermarriages were particularly common in the Emirate of Sicily, where one writer visiting the place in the 970s expressed shock at how common it was in rural areas. After the Norman conquest of southern Italy, all Muslim citizens (whether foreign, native or mixed) of the Kingdom of Sicily were known as "Moors". After a brief period when the Arab-Norman culture had flourished under the reign of Roger II of Sicily, later rulers forced the Moors to either convert to Christianity or be expelled from the kingdom to Muslim settlement of Lucera in 1224 CE/AD.

In Malta, North Africans and Italians from neighbouring Sicily and Calabria intermarried with the local inhabitants, who were descended from Phoenicians, Greeks, Romans and Vandals. There are Maltese people are descended from such unions, and the Maltese language is descended from Siculo-Arabic.

At times, the Italian city-states also played an active role in the Arab slave trade, where Moorish and Italian traders occasionally exchanged slaves.

During World War II, France's Moroccan troops known as Goumiers committed war rapes in Italy, especially after the Battle of Monte Cassino, and also in smaller numbers in France and Germany. In Italy, victims of the mass rape committed after the Battle of Monte Cassino by Goumiers are known as Marocchinate. According to Italian sources, more than 7,000 Italian civilians, including women and children, were raped by Goumiers.

=== Russia ===
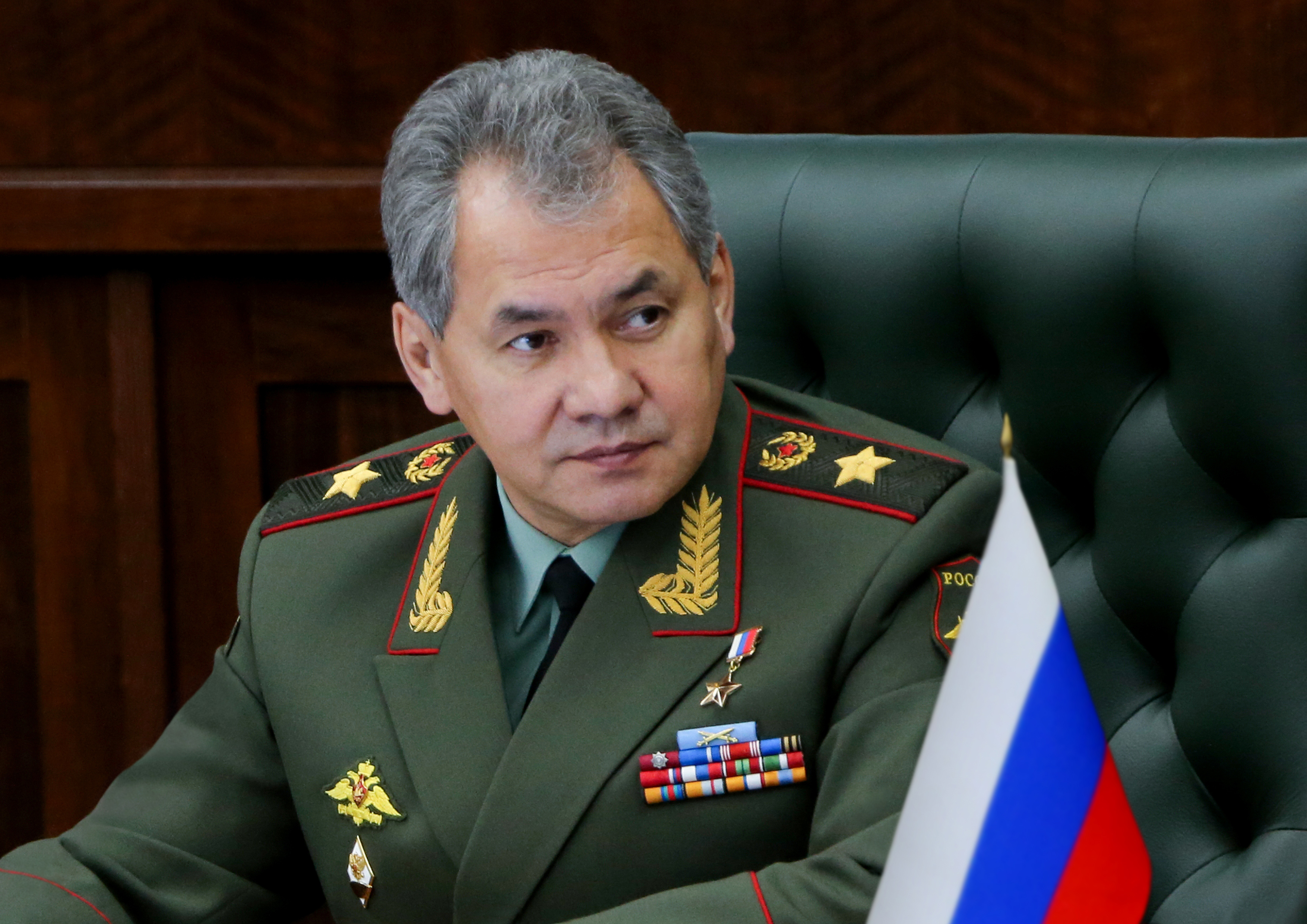
Russia's Defense Minister Sergey Shoygu is the son of Tuvan father and Russian mother.

Already in the 17th century there were many marriages between Russian settlers and aborigines of Siberia.

The Metis Foundation estimates that there are about 40,000 mixed-race Russians.

Many Chinese men, even those who had left wives and children behind in China, married local women in the 1920s, especially those women who had been widowed during the wars and upheavals of the previous decade. Their mixed race children tended to be given Russian forenames; some retained their fathers' Chinese surnames, while others took on Russian surnames, and a large proportion also invented new surnames using their father's entire family name and given name as the new surname.

In 2017, The Moscow Times reported that "Mixed-race marriages are becoming more common in Russia."

=== Southeastern and Eastern Europe ===
Vikings explored and eventually settled in territories in Slavic-dominated areas of Eastern Europe. By 950 AD these settlements were largely Slavicized through intermarriage with the local population. Eastern Europe was also an important source for the Arab slave trade at the time, when Saqaliba (Slavic) slaves were taken to the Arab world, where the women and girls often served in harems, some of whom married their Arab masters. When the Mongol Empire annexed much of Eastern Europe in the 13th century, the Mongols also intermarried with the local population and often engaged in war rape and capturing sex slaves during the Mongol invasion of Europe.

=== United Kingdom ===
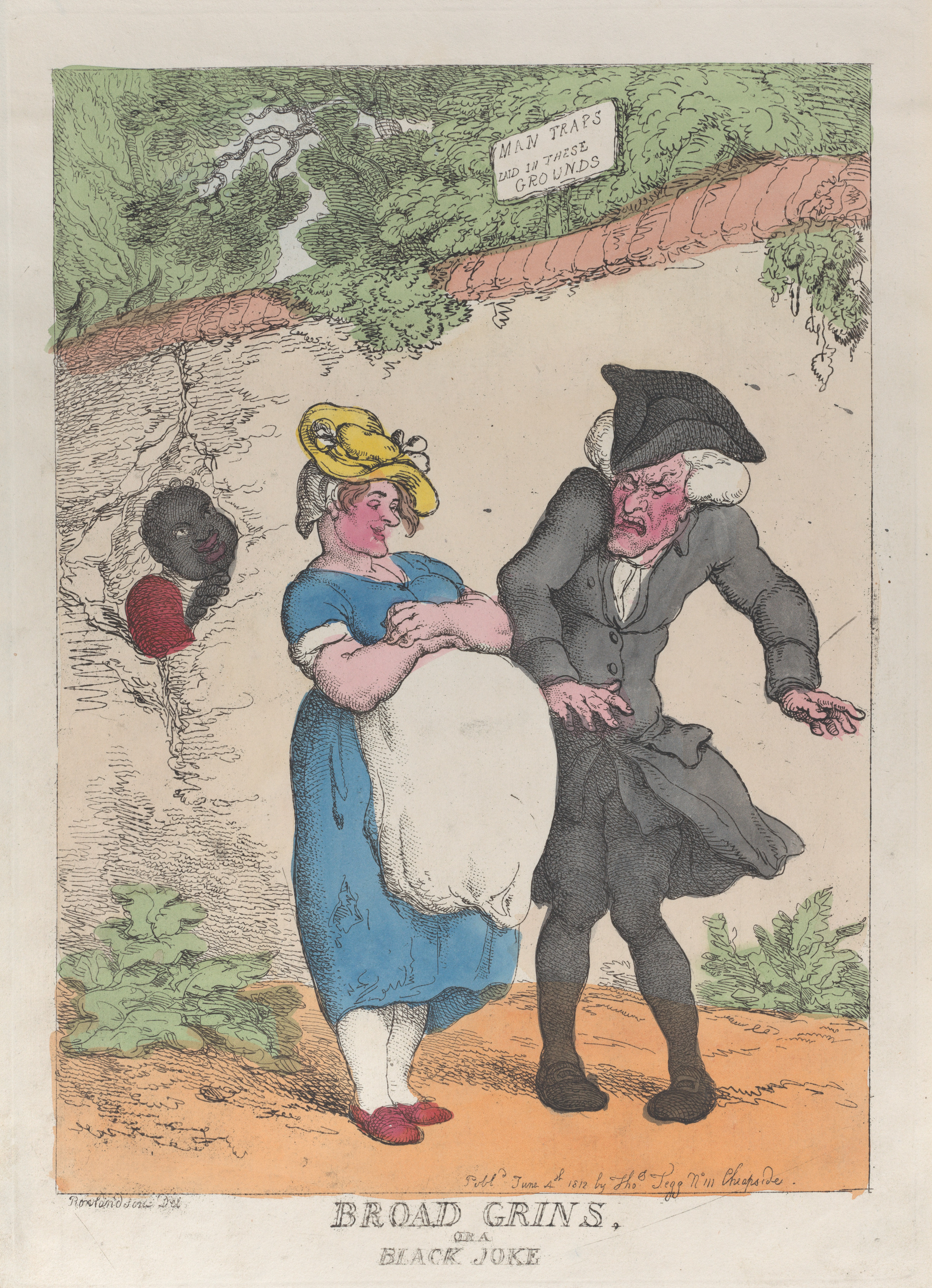
Broad Grins, or a Black Joke, satiric print by Thomas Rowlandson, 1812

In the late 15th century, the Romani people, who have Indian origins, arrived in Britain. The Romani in Britain intermarried with the local population and became known to the Romani as the Romanichal. In India, employees and officers of the British East India Company, as well as other European soldiers, intermarried with Indian women. Children born in these marriages were called Anglo-Indians. On some occasions, Indian women moved to Britain to live with their husbands. The British East India Company brought many South Asian lascars (maritime auxiliaries employed by British mercantile and shipping companies) to Britain, where many settled down with local white British wives, due to a lack of Asian women in Britain at the time.

Inter-ethnic relationships have become increasingly accepted over the last several decades. As of 2001, 2% of all marriages in Britain are inter-ethnic. Despite having a much lower non-white population (9%), mixed marriages in the United Kingdom are as common as in the United States, although America has many fewer specific definitions of the race (four racial definitions as opposed to the United Kingdom's 86). As of 2005, it is estimated that nearly half of British-born African-Caribbean males, a third of British-born African-Caribbean females, and a fifth of Indian and African males, have white partners. As of 2009, one in 10 children in the UK lives in a mixed-race or mixed-ethnicity family (families headed by one white-British parent and one white parent not of British origin are included in the figure) and two out of five Chinese women have partners of a different race. One out of five Chinese men have partners of a different race. According to the UK 2001 census, black British males were around 50% more likely than black females to marry outside their race. British Chinese women (30%) were twice as likely as their male counterparts (15%) to marry someone from a different ethnic group.

== Middle East ==
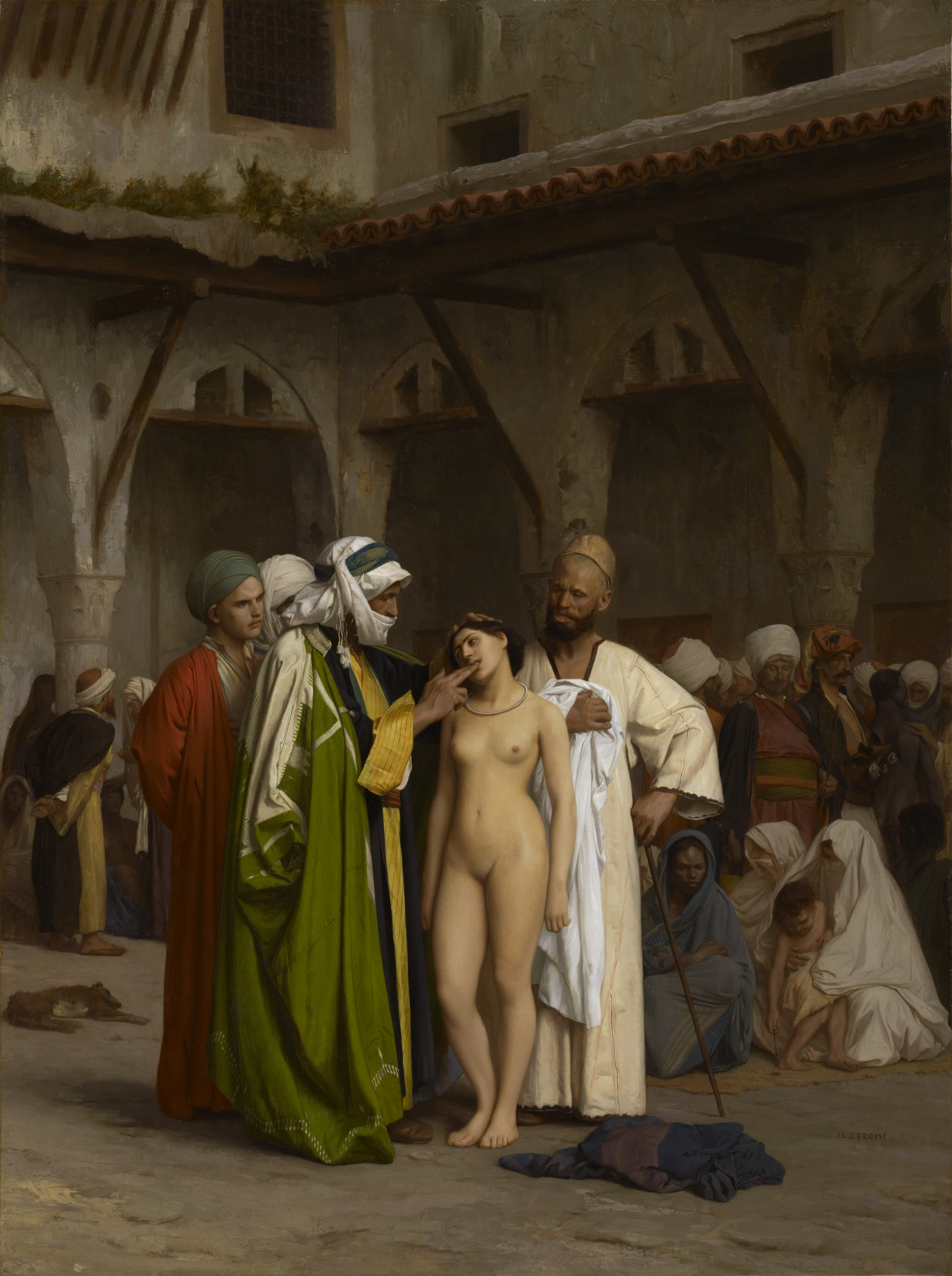
The Slave Market, by Jean-Léon Gérôme, c. 1884

A Stanford team found the greatest diversity outside Africa among people living in the wide crescent of land stretching from the eastern shore of the Mediterranean to northern India. Not only was the region among the first colonized by the African migrants, they theorize, but a large number of European and East Asian genes among the population indicates that it has long been a human highway, with large numbers of migrants from both directions conquering, trading and generally reproducing along its entire length. The same team also found out that the Bedouin nomads of the Middle East actually have some similarities to Europeans and South Asians.

Inter-ethnic sexual slavery was common during the Arab slave trade throughout the Middle Ages and early modern period, when women and girls bought from warlords in non-Arab lands often ended up as concubines. Most of these slaves came from places such as Sub-Saharan Africa (mainly Zanj), South Asia (Hindus), the North Caucasus (mainly Circassians), Central Asia (mainly Turks), and Central and Eastern Europe (mainly Saqaliba). The Barbary pirates also captured a number of slaves from Western Europe and North America between the 16th and 19th centuries. It was also common for Arab conquerors, traders and explorers to marry local females in the lands they conquered or traded with, in various parts of Africa, Asia (see Asia section) and Europe (see Europe section).

Inter-ethnic relationships were generally accepted in Arabic society and formed a fairly common theme in medieval Arabic literature and Persian literature. For example, the Persian poet Nizami, who had himself married his Kipchak slave girl, wrote The Seven Beauties (1196). Its frame story involves a Persian prince marrying seven foreign princesses, including Byzantine, Chinese, Indian, Khwarezmian, Maghrebian, Slavic and Tartar princesses. Hadith Bayad wa Riyad, a 12th-century Arabic tale from Al-Andalus, was a love story involving an Iberian girl and a Damascene man. The One Thousand and One Nights tale of "The Man of Al-Yaman and His Six Slave-Girls" involves a Yemeni man's relationship with foreign slave girls, four of which are white, black, brown and yellow. Another One Thousand and One Nights tale, "The Ebony Horse", involves the Prince of Persia, Qamar al-Aqmar, rescuing his lover, the Princess of Sana'a, from the Byzantine Emperor who also wishes to marry her.

One study found that some Arabic-speaking populations—Palestinians, Jordanians, Syrians, Iraqis, and Bedouins—have what appears to be substantial mtDNA gene flow from sub-Saharan Africa, amounting to 10–15% of lineages within the past three millennia. In the case of Yemenites, the average is higher at 35%.

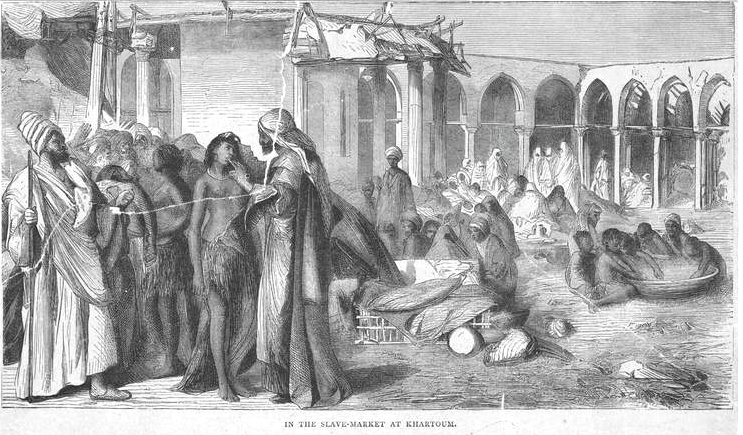
A slave market in Khartoum, Sudan, c. 1876

A genetic anthropological study known as the Genographic Project has found what is believed to be faint genetic traces left by medieval Crusaders in the Middle East. The team has uncovered a specific DNA signature in Syria, Lebanon, Palestine and Jordan that is probably linked to the 7th and 8th Christian crusades. The Crusaders originated from European kingdoms, mostly France, England and the Holy Roman Empire.

Human trafficking continues today in a smaller form in the Gulf Cooperation Council state, where women and children are trafficked from the post-Soviet states, Eastern Europe, Far East, Africa, South Asia and other parts of the Middle East.

=== Israel ===
Among the Jewish population in Israel as of 2014, over 25% of the schoolchildren and over 35% of all newborns are of mixed ancestry of both Ashkenazi and Sephardi/Mizrahi descent, which increases by 0.5% each year. Over 50% of the Jewish population is of at least partial Sephardi/Mizrahi descent.

In Israel, all marriages must be approved by religious authorities, while civil marriages are legally recognized if performed abroad. Rules governing marriage are based on strict religious guidelines of each religion. Under Israeli law, authority over all issues related to Judaism in Israel, including marriage, falls under the Chief Rabbinate of Israel, which is Orthodox. Orthodox Judaism is the only form of Judaism recognized by the state, and marriages performed in Israel by non-Orthodox rabbis are not recognized.

The Rabbinate prohibits marriage in Israel of halakhic Jews (i.e. people born to a Jewish mother or Jewish by conversion), whether they are Orthodox Jews or not, to partners who are non-Jewish or who are of Jewish descent that runs through the paternal line (i.e. not Jewish according to halakha), unless they undergo a formal conversion to Judaism. As a result, in the state of Israel, people of differing religious traditions cannot legally marry someone of another religion and multi-faith couples must leave the country to get married.

The only other option in Israel for the marriage of a halakhic Jew (Orthodox or not) to a non-Jew, or for that matter, a Christian to a non-Christian or Muslim to a non-Muslim, is for one partner to formally convert to the other's religion, be it to Orthodox Judaism, a Christian denomination or a denomination of Islam. As for persons with patrilineal Jewish descent (i.e. not recognized as Jewish according to halakha) who wish to marry a halakhic Jew (i.e., born to a Jewish mother or is Jewish by Orthodox conversion) who is Orthodox or otherwise, is also required to formally convert to Orthodox Judaism or they cannot legally marry.

According to a Haaretz article "Justice Ministry drafts civil marriage law for 'refuseniks'" 300,000 people, or 150,000 couples, are affected by marriage restrictions based on the partners' disparate religious traditions or non-halakhic Jewish status. A poll in 2014 found that three-quarters of Israeli Jews and two-thirds of Israeli Palestinians would not marry someone from a different religion. Inter-faith relationships were opposed by 95 percent of Haredi Jews, 88 percent of traditional and religious Jews and 64 percent of secular Jews.

A group of 35 Jewish men, known as "Fire for Judaism", in Pisgat Ze'ev have started patrolling the town in an effort to stop Jewish women from dating Palestinian men. The municipality of Petah Tikva has also announced an initiative to prevent interracial relationships, providing a telephone hotline for friends and family to "inform" on Jewish girls who date Palestinian men as well as psychologists to provide counselling. The town of Kiryat Gat launched a school programme in schools to warn Jewish girls against dating local Bedouin men.

In February 2010 Maariv has reported that the Tel Aviv municipality has instituted an official, government-sponsored "counselling program" to discourage Jewish girls from dating and marrying Palestinian boys. The Times has also reported on a vigilante parents' group policing the Jerusalem neighborhood of Pisgat Ze'ev to intimidate and discourage local Palestinian-Jewish couples. The Jewish anti-missionary group Yad L'Achim has also performed paramilitary "rescue operations" of Jewish women from non-Jewish husbands and celebrates the "rescued women" on their website.

In 2005 Ben-Zion Gopstein, a disciple of the ultra-nationalist Meir Kahane, founded the anti-miscegenation organisation Lehava. The group's name is an acronym for "To Prevent Assimilation in the Holy Land". In November 2019, Gopstein was indicted on charges of incitement to terrorism, violence and racism.

In 2014 the marriage of a Muslim groom and a bride who had converted from Judaism to Islam attracted attention when the wedding was protested by Lehava, an organisation opposing Jewish assimilation. An Israeli court allowed the protest to go ahead but ordered protesters to stay at least 200 metres away from the wedding venue in Rishon LeZion. In response, a demonstration in support for the couple was also held.

=== Turkey ===
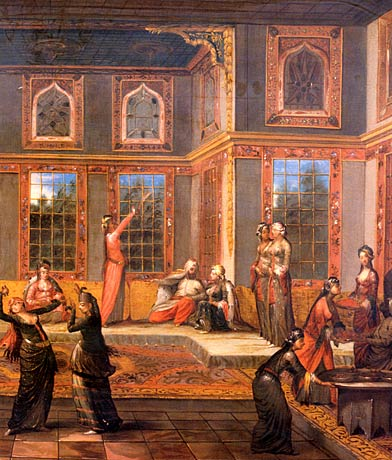
Imaginary scene from the sultan's harem

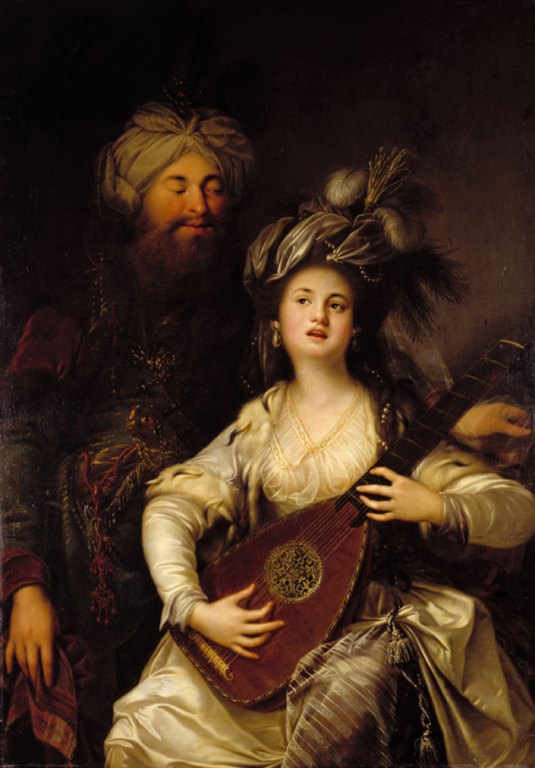
An artistic depiction of Ruthenian slave girl Roxelana with Suleiman the Magnificent, by German painter Anton Hickel (1780)

In the 11th century, the Byzantine territory of Anatolia was conquered by the Seljuq Turks, who came from Turkestan in Central Asia. Their Ottoman Turkish descendants went on to annex the Balkans and much of Eastern Europe in the 15th and 16th centuries. Due to Islamic marital law allowing a Muslim male to marry Christian and Jewish females, it was common in the Ottoman Empire for Turkish males to intermarry with European females. For example, various sultans of the Ottoman Dynasty often had Greek (Rûm), Slavic (Saqaliba), Venetian, Northcaucasian and French wives.

In the Ottoman Empire, in addition to the Ottoman elites often taking large numbers of European wives and concubines (see Southeastern and Eastern Europe section), there were also opportunities for the reverse, when the empire recruited young Christian boys (Europeans and Christian Levantines) to become the elite troops of the Turkish Empire, the Janissaries. These Janissaries were stationed throughout the Turkish empire including the Middle-East and North Africa leading to inter-ethnic relationships between European men and women from the Middle East and North Africa.

The concubines of the Ottoman Sultan consisted chiefly of purchased slaves. Because Islamic law forbade Muslims to enslave fellow Muslims, the Sultan's concubines were generally of Christian origin. The mother of a Sultan, though technically a slave, received the extremely powerful title of valide sultan, and at times became effective ruler of the Empire (see Sultanate of women). One notable example was Kösem Sultan, daughter of a Greek Christian priest, who dominated the Ottoman Empire during the early decades of the 17th century. Another notable example was Roxelana, the favourite wife of Suleiman the Magnificent.

Some of these European wives exerted great influence upon the empire as valide sultan ("Mother-Sultan"), some famous examples including Roxelana, a Ukrainian harem slave who later became Suleiman the Magnificent's favourite wife, and Nakşidil Sultan, wife of Abdul Hamid I, who according to the legend may have been Aimée du Buc de Rivéry, cousin of French Empress Josephine. Due to the common occurrence of such intermarriages in the Ottoman Empire, they have had a significant impact on the ethnic makeup of the modern Turkish population in Turkey, which now differs from that of the Turkic population in Central Asia. In addition to intermarriage, the large harems of Ottoman sultans often consisted almost entirely of female concubines who were of Christian European origin. Sultan Ibrahim the Mad, Ottoman ruler from 1640 to 1648, is said to have drowned 280 concubines of his harem in the Bosphorus. At least one of his concubines, Turhan Hatice, Ukrainian girl captured during one of the raids by Tatars and sold into slavery, survived his reign.

== Oceania ==
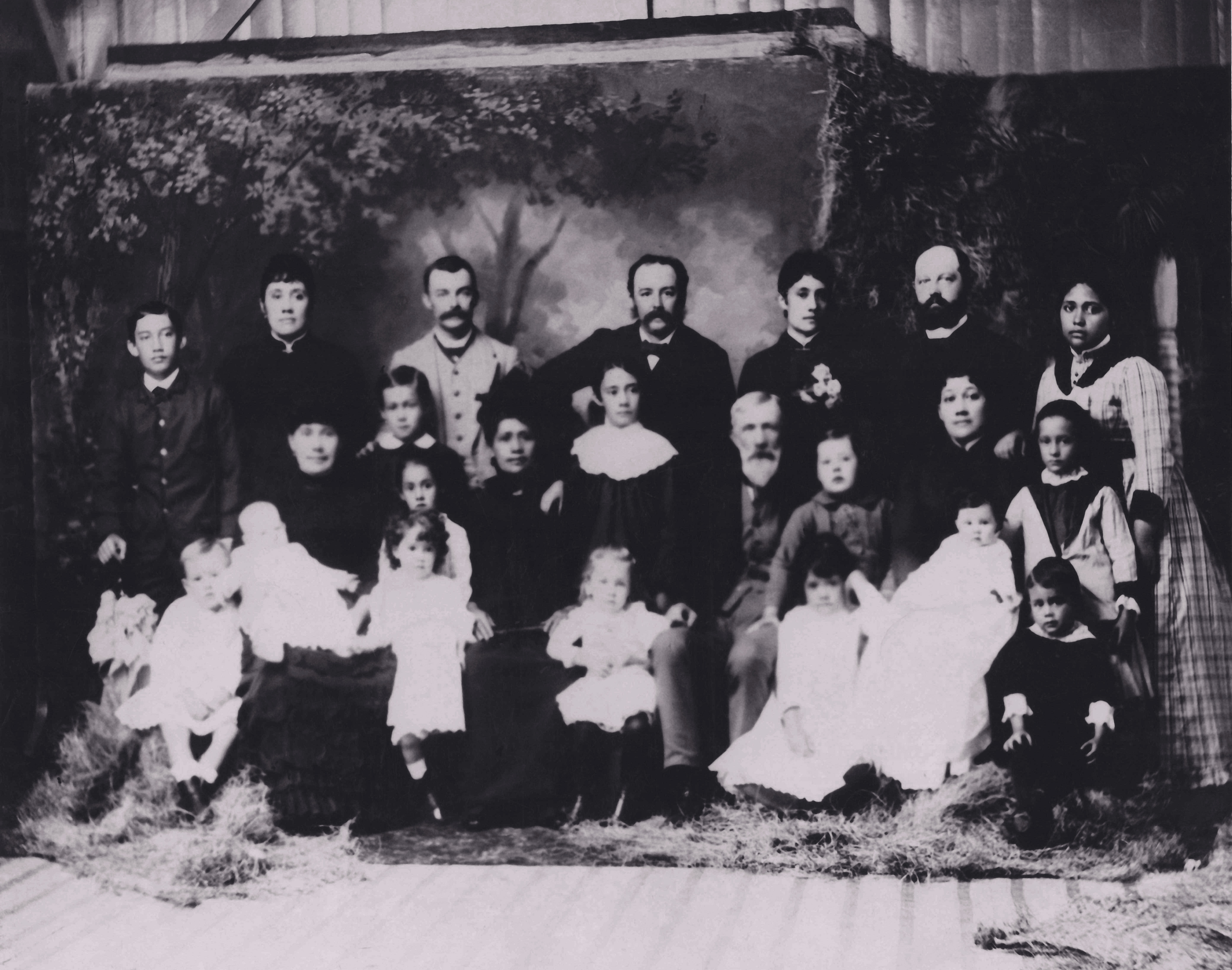
German immigrant Hermann A. Widemann had a large family with his Hawaiian wife Mary Kaumana, 1886.

=== Australia ===
Miscegenation was a deliberate policy of the Western Australian Protector of Aborigines, A. O. Neville, who hoped to "breed out" Aboriginal characteristics from the growing "half caste" population of Aborigines in Western Australia. As a result, he failed to prosecute cases where half caste girls were sexually abused or raped by European Australians, who sought an evening on "the black velvet". The children of such unions were often taken from their mothers and confined to "concentration camps" at Moore River and Carrolup, as a part of the policy known as Stolen Generations.

The desire to avoid miscegenation was also a factor in the passage and continued enforcement of the White Australia policy. In 1949, Immigration Minister Arthur Calwell stated "I am sure we don't want half-castes running over our country", while justifying the government's decision to refuse entry to Lorenzo Gamboa (a Filipino man and U.S. Army veteran who had an Australian wife and children).

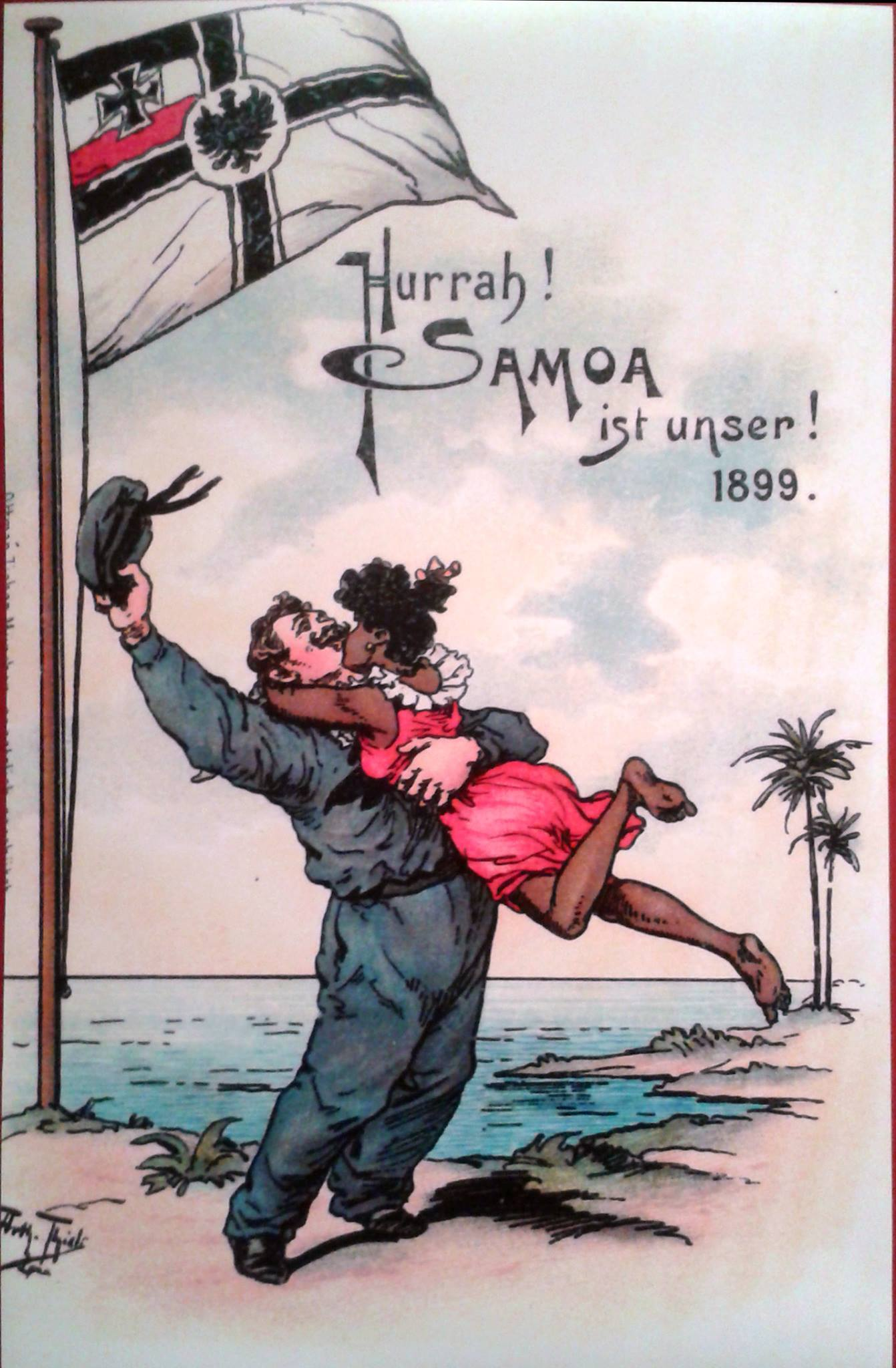
An illustration of an interracial couple in German Samoa in 1899

Historical marriages of Aboriginal Australian women with European men, Asian men, and African men of various nationality have been recorded in the late 19th and 20th century. Chinese immigrant men and other Asian men migrated to Australia and intermarried with Aboriginal Australian women. In 1913, anthropologist and temporary Chief Protector Walter Baldwin Spencer opposed these intermarriages and demonstrated clear bias against the mixing of Aboriginal women and Asian men (as opposed to white men), claiming their sexual contact caused 'rapid degeneration of the native'.

Most of the early Chinese-Australian population was formed by Cantonese migrants from Guangzhou and Taishan, including some from Fujian, who came during the goldrush period of the 1850s. Marriage records show that between the 1850s and around the start of the 20th century, there were about 2,000 legal marriages between white women and migrant Chinese men in Australia's eastern colonies, probably with similar numbers involved in de facto relationships of various kinds. Rallies against Chinese men taking white women became widespread. In late 1878 there were 181 marriages between European women and ethnic Chinese men, and 171 couples cohabiting without matrimony, resulting in 586 children.

=== New Zealand ===
Mixed marriages are very common. Historically they have been viewed with tolerance and almost universally accepted in New Zealand. People who identify as Māori typically have ancestors ('tīpuna') from at least two distinct ethnicities. Historically this lent itself to the belief that "real" Māori were gradually disappearing from New Zealand through mixed marriage. This view held sway in New Zealand until the late 1960s and 1970s, when a revival and re-establishment of Māori culture and tradition coincided with a rejection of the majority opinion.

The belief that Māori were disappearing was partially founded on the reality of high rates of intermarriage between Europeans and Māori since colonisation. During the revival of Māori culture and tradition, this belief was challenged by redefining "Māori" as an ethnic identity as opposed to a racial category. The notion of being "mixed-race" has always been uncommon.. As a result, a person may have one European/Asian/Pacific parent and one Māori parent, but be considered no less "authentically Māori" than a descendant of two Māori as most Māori believe any degree of Māori ancestry being considered enough to identify as Māori.

As of 2010, two-thirds of Māori births, half of Pacific births, and a third of white and Asian births involved more than one ethnic group.

According to a 2006 study, Māori have on average roughly 43% European ancestry, and rates are rising.

== Portuguese colonies ==
According to Gilberto Freyre, a Brazilian sociologist, interracial marriage was commonplace in the Portuguese colonies, and was even supported by the court as a way to boost low populations and guarantee a successful and cohesive settlement. Thus, settlers often released African slaves to become their wives. The children were guaranteed full Portuguese citizenship, provided the parents were married. Some former Portuguese colonies have large mixed-race populations, for instance, Brazil, Cape Verde, Mozambique, Timor Leste, Macau and São Tomé and Príncipe. In the case of Brazil, the influential "Indianist" novels of José de Alencar (O Guarany, Iracema, and Ubirajara) perhaps went farther than in the other colonies, advocating miscegenation in order to create a truly Brazilian race.

Mixed marriages between Portuguese and locals in former colonies were very common in all Portuguese colonies. Miscegenation was still common in Africa until the independence of the former Portuguese colonies in the mid-1970s. The case for miscegenation in Brazil started in the 1700s when gold was discovered in the heart of the country. This created a spectacular gold rush that lasted nearly 100 years. In this period close to a million men immigrated to Brazil in search of a quick fortune, mostly Portuguese. Since these men had no plans to bring their families, in the process they ended up fathering children with either African slaves or Native American women. Since immigration during this period was overwhelmingly by males, this created a less strict society in terms of enforcing anti-racial laws.

However, Brazil was the last country in the western hemisphere to grant freedom to the slaves, only happening in 1888. When the slaves were freed, the plantation owners encouraged immigration from Europe as a form to replace the slaves. At the beginning of the 20th century, eugenics set foot in Brazil, and although it stated that the white race was superior to the other races, in the end, it somehow contributed to the continuation of the miscegenation of Brazil. With the Politica do Branqueamento (Whitening Policy), the Eugenics encouraged mulatto women (daughter of black and white parents) to marry a white man. According to them, the child would be born much whiter than her mother. A famous painting by Modesto Brocos describes these hopes, showing a black grandmother with her arms to the sky, thanking God for white grandchildren. In the painting, a white man sits at the door, and his wife, a mulatto woman, is holding the child, while the mother is much darker than the daughter.
