= Cafres =

Ethnic group

Cafres or Kafs, are people born in Réunion of African origins. This includes people of Malagasy ancestry. Many also have admixture from other ethnic groups.

== Use of the term ==
Like the Sri Lanka Kaffirs, the name Cafres is derived from the Arabic word for infidels, kafir, which in East Africa came to mean Black people specifically.

In Réunion, contrary to other countries or regions of the south-west of the Indian Ocean, the term is in common use. It means "any individual whose phenotype goes back more or less to African/Malagasy origins", as described by the sociologist Paul Mayoka in his essay "The image of the cafre". The term is also used to mean ethnic groups of Southeast African origin from where slaves came.

The term is also used in the phrase 'fête des Cafres'. This is one of the names given to the annual celebration of the abolition of slavery on the island on 20 December 1848.

== Origins ==
The ancestors of the Cafres were enslaved Africans. Brought from mainland Africa and Madagascar to work the sugar plantations; these were the first slaves to be introduced to the Mascarene Islands. The slaves came from Mozambique, Guinea, Senegal and Madagascar. Most trace their roots to Madagascar and East Africa (Mozambique, Tanzania, Zambia) although some descended from runaways from European pirate ships.

== Religion ==
The Cafres are mostly Christian. Due to the loose definition of the term, the rising number of second generation Muslim Comorians and Mahorians are also considered Cafres.
