= Edouard Wah =

Haitian painter (1938–2003)

- Born: Edouard King Fong Wah; 1938; Port-au-Prince, Haiti
- Died: September 30, 2003 (aged 64–65); Port-au-Prince, Haiti
- Known for: Painting

Edouard King Fong Wah (1938 in Port-au-Prince, Haiti – September 30, 2003 in Port-au-Prince, Haiti), better known as Edouard Wah, was a renowned Haitian painter.

== Early life ==
Wah was born and raised in the country's capital city of Port-au-Prince. Wah was of mixed ancestry: his mother was Afro-Haitian and his father was a Chinese immigrant. At the age of seven, while attending one of the best parochial schools of the capital, he received his first formal instruction in perspective and anatomy. To further enhance his natural abilities, his father had him tutored by one of Haiti's premier art teachers during that era.

A few years later, Wah began utilizing mediums that he did not have much practice with before, notably oil on canvas and masonite. Early in his career, he deviated from his original "naif" style characteristic of Haitian art to experiment with classical era painting. After experimenting and subsequently mastering these styles, he ultimately settled for the modern eclectic style which he then identified himself with, despite the fact that it was introduced to him in the latter part of his artistic career.

== Years in Port-au-Prince ==
In 1952, Wah and his younger brother Bernard studied at Foyer des Arts Plastiques school in Port-au-Prince, picking up new techniques with such Haitian experts as Petion Savain, Dieudonne Cedor, Wilson Jolicoeur, Luckner Lazard and many others. Aside from painting, Wah's other interests included acting, which he took up as a side job to his artistic career.

In 1963, Wah decided to found a cultural center "Calfou", also in Port-au-Prince, as a means of allowing people to experience Haitian culture, notably the arts and music. During that same year, he and his brother were commissioned by the Haitian government to restore the murals in the bicentennial section of the city, which encompassed certain other cultural centers and public buildings in the capital.

== Legacy ==
In 1971, during the peak of the Duvalier regime, Wah emigrated to the United States, relocating to Philadelphia where he would reside for the next thirteen years. On one of many visits to his homeland, Edouard King Fong Wah died on September 27, 2003, in his beloved country of Haiti. He is survived by two daughters and two sons.

== Notable works ==
- Women Pounding Grain
- Haitian Men Playing Dice

== See also ==
- Haitian art
