= Mulatto =

Racial classification

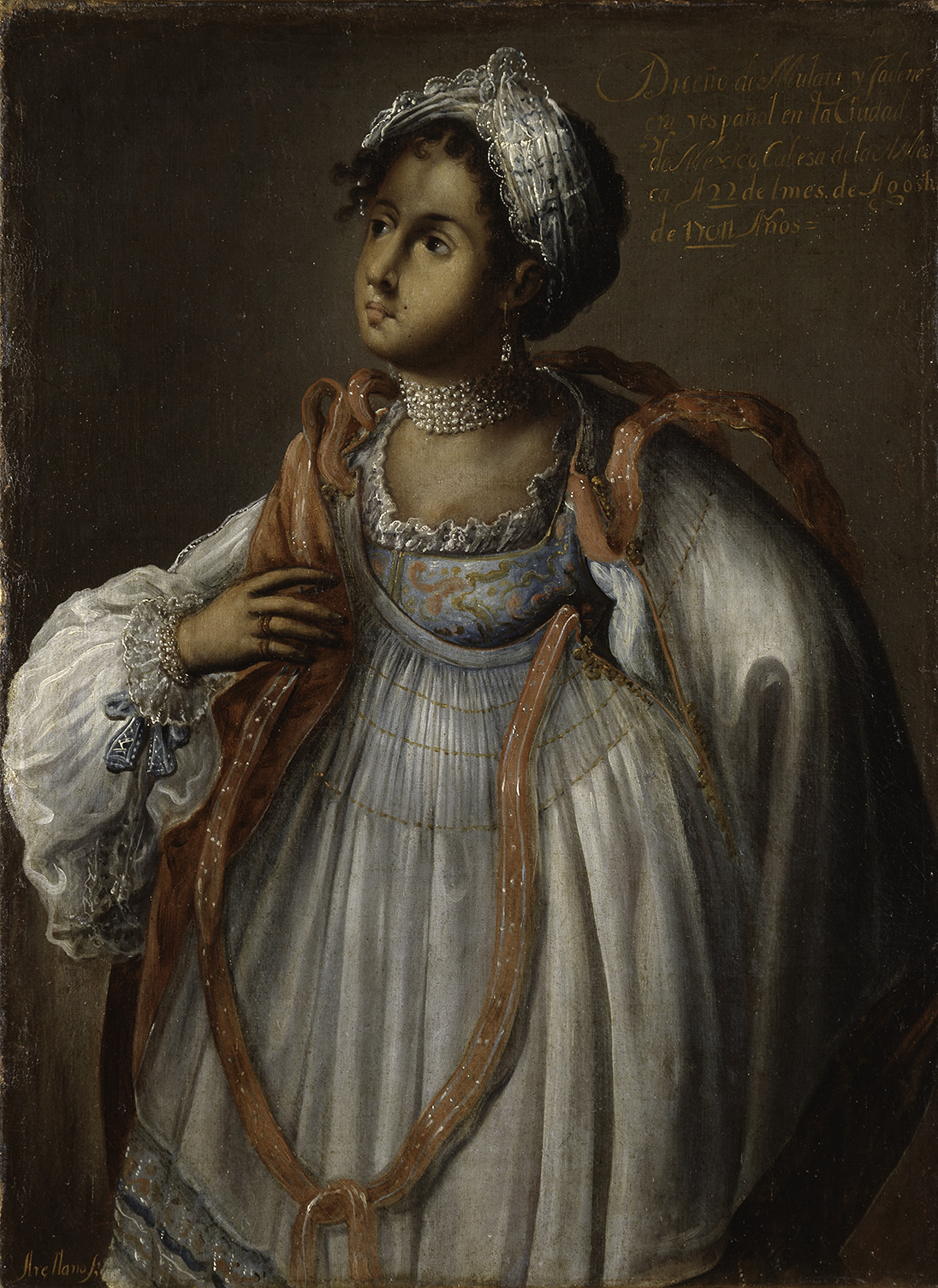
- A mulatta woman in the viceregal era in 1711

Regions with significant populations
- Latin America; mainly Colombia; Brazil; Dominican Republic; Venezuela; Puerto Rico; Panama; Caribbean; Cape Verde; United States

Languages
- Spanish; Portuguese; French; English; Cape Verdean

Religion
- Predominantly Roman Catholic; religious minorities including Protestants exist

Related ethnic groups
- White people; Black people; other mixed people; Pardo; Mestizo; Zambo

Mulatto (UK: /mjuːˈlætoʊ, məˈ-/ mew-LAT-oh, mə-, US: /məˈlɑːtoʊ, mjuːˈ-/ mə-LAH-toh, mew-) is a racial classification that refers to people of mixed African and European ancestry. When speaking or writing about a singular woman in English, the word is mulatta (Spanish: mulata). The use of this term began in areas that later became the United States shortly after the Atlantic slave trade began.

Although it has been employed in derogatory contexts, some mixed-race communities reject the claim that the term is inherently offensive and instead regard it as a descriptor that has been mischaracterized by individuals who are not of mixed-race origin. Since the post Civil Rights Era, the term is considered controversial in the United States. It has begun to be deemed a racist term in Brazil recently, with the government explicitly advising against its use, in spite of its long usage in the Brazilian Portuguese vernaculars. In other English-, Spanish-, and Dutch-speaking countries, for example in the West Indies and Hispanic America, the word mulatto (or a derivative) is still used.

Countries with the highest percentages of persons who have equally high European and African ancestry are the Dominican Republic (74%) and Cape Verde (71%). Mulattos in many Latin American countries, although of predominately European and African ancestry, usually also have slight indigenous admixture. Race-mixing has been prevalent in Latin America for centuries, since the start of the European colonization of the Americas in many cases. Many Latin American multiracial families (including mulatto) have been mixed for several generations. In the 21st century, multiracials frequently have unions and marriages with other multiracials. Other countries and territories with significant mulatto populations in percentage or total number include Cuba, Puerto Rico, Nicaragua, Venezuela, Panama, Colombia, South Africa, and the United States.

== Etymology ==
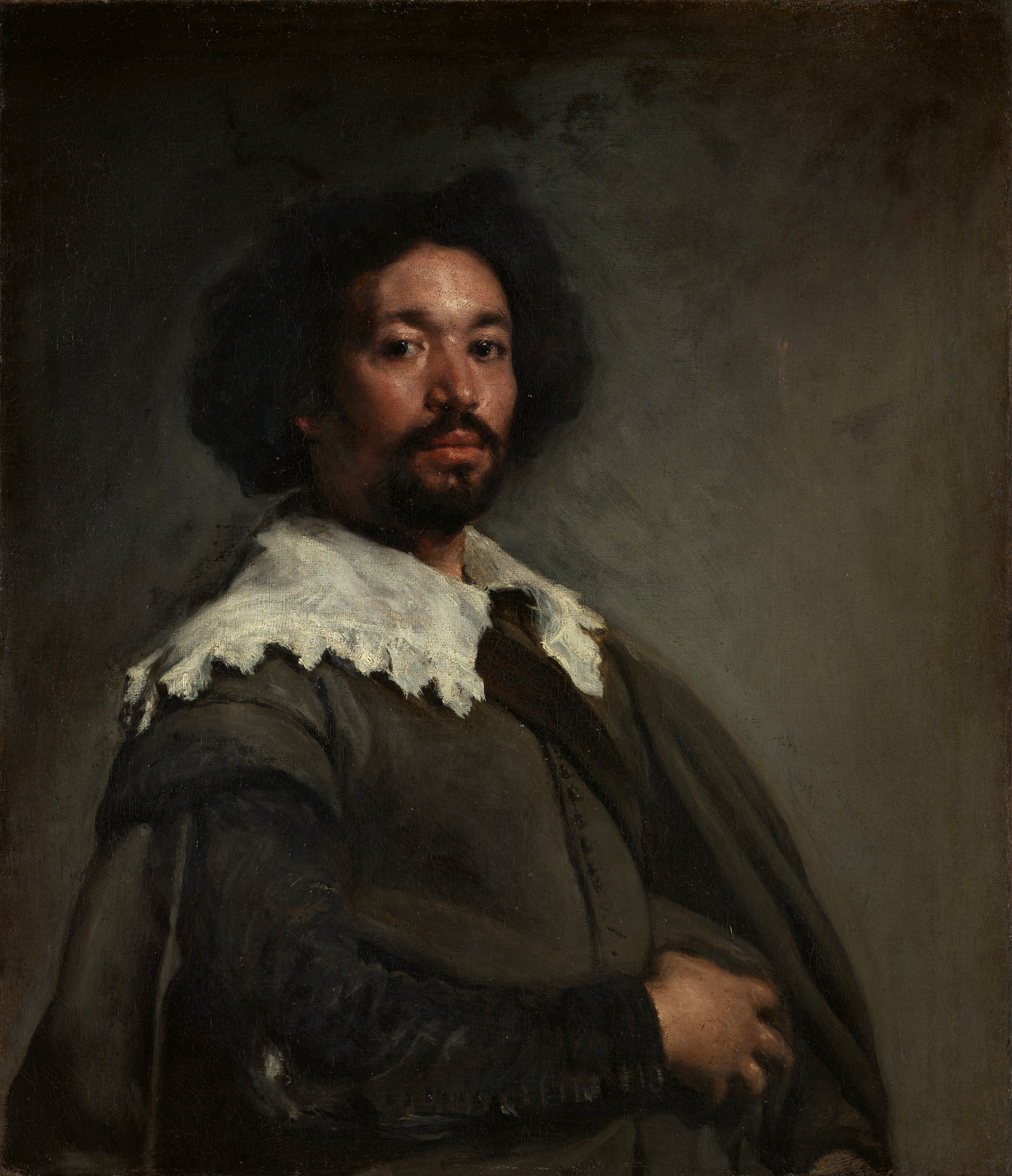
Juan de Pareja by Diego Velázquez, CE 1650 – Juan de Pareja was born into slavery in Spain. He was of mixed African and Spanish descent.

In English, printed usage of mulatto dates to at least the 16th century. The 1595 work Drake's Voyages first used the term in the context of intimate unions producing biracial children. The Oxford English Dictionary defined mulatto as "one who is the offspring of a European and a Black". This earliest usage regarded "black" and "white" as discrete "species", with the "mulatto" constituting a third separate "species".

=== Latin-based language origin ===
The English term and spelling mulatto is derived from the Spanish and Portuguese mulato. It was a common term in the Southeastern United States during the era of slavery. Some sources suggest that it may derive from the Spanish and Portuguese word mula (from the Latin mūlus), meaning 'mule', the hybrid offspring of a horse and a donkey. The Real Academia Española traces its origin to mulo in the sense of hybridity; originally used to refer to any mixed race person.

Werner Sollors, professor of English and African American Studies at Harvard University, casts doubt on the mule etymology for mulatto. In the 18th and 19th centuries, racialists such as Edward Long and Josiah Nott began to assert that mulattos were sterile like mules. They projected this belief back onto the etymology of the word mulatto. Sollors points out that this etymology is anachronistic: "The Mulatto sterility hypothesis that has much to do with the rejection of the term by some writers is only half as old as the word 'Mulatto'."

The term is now generally considered controversial in the United States, and was considered offensive even in the 19th century. The use of this word does not have the same negative associations found among English speakers. Among Latinos in both the US and Latin America, the word is used in every day speech and its meaning is a source of racial and ethnic pride.

In Latin-based languages, the default, masculine word ends with the letter "o" and is written as follows: Portuguese and Spanish – mulato; Italian – mulatto. However, the French equivalent is mulâtre. In Dutch, the direct translation is mulat. In English, the masculine plural is written as mulattos while in Spanish and Portuguese it is mulatos. The masculine plural in Italian is mulatti and in French it is mulâtres. The feminine plurals are: English – mulattas; Spanish and Portuguese – mulatas; Italian – mulatte; French – mulâtresses.

=== Arabic origin ===
Jack D. Forbes suggests it originated in the Arabic term muwallad, which means 'a person of mixed ancestry'. Muwallad literally means 'born, begotten, produced, generated; brought up', with the implication of being born of Arab and non-Arab parents. Muwallad is derived from the root word WaLaD (Arabic: ولد, direct Arabic transliteration: waw, lam, dal) and colloquial Arabic pronunciation can vary greatly. Walad means 'descendant, offspring, scion; child; son; boy; young animal, young one'.

In al-Andalus, muwallad referred to the offspring from parents of Arab Muslim origin and non-Arab Muslim people who adopted the Islamic religion and manners. Specifically, the term was historically applied to the descendants of indigenous Christian Iberians and Berber and Arab Muslims who, after several generations of living among a Muslim majority, adopted their culture and religion.

According to Julio Izquierdo Labrado, the 19th-century linguist Leopoldo Eguilaz y Yanguas, as well as some Arabic sources muwallad is the etymological origin of mulato. These sources specify that mulato would have been derived directly from muwallad independently of the related word muladí, a term that was applied to Iberian Christians, who had converted to Islam during the Moorish governance of Iberia in the Middle Ages.

The Real Academia Española (Spanish Royal Academy) casts doubt on the muwallad theory. It states, "The term mulata is documented in our diachronic data bank in 1472 and is used in reference to livestock mules in Documentacion medieval de la Corte de Justicia de Ganaderos de Zaragoza, whereas muladí (from mullawadí) does not appear until the 18th century, according to [Joan] Corominas". (Note: Corominas describes his doubts on the theory as follows: "[Mulato] does not derive from the Arab muwállad, 'acculturated foreigner' and sometimes 'mulatto' (see 'Mdí'), as Eguílaz would have it, since this word was pronounced 'moo-EL-led' in the Arabic of Spain. In the 19th century, Reinhart Dozy (Supplément aux Dictionnaires Arabes, Vol. II, Leyden, 1881, 841a) rejected this Arabic etymology, indicating the true one, supported by the Arabic nagîl, 'mulatto', derived from nagl, 'mule'.")

== Africa ==
Of São Tomé and Príncipe's 193,413 inhabitants, the largest segment is classified as mestiço, or mixed race. 71% of the population of Cape Verde is also classified as such. The great majority of their current populations descend from unions between the Portuguese, who colonized the islands from the 15th century onward, and Africans they brought from the African continent south of the Sahara to work as slaves. In the early years, mestiços began to form a third-class between the Portuguese colonists and black African slaves, as they were usually bilingual and often served as interpreters between the populations.

In Angola and Mozambique, the mestiço constitute smaller but still important minorities; 2% in Angola and 0.2% in Mozambique.

Mulatto and mestiço are not terms commonly used in South Africa to refer to people of mixed ancestry. The persistence of some authors in using this term, anachronistically, reflects the old-school essentialist views of race as a de facto biological phenomenon, and the 'mixing' of race as legitimate grounds for the creation of a 'new race'. This disregards cultural, linguistic and ethnic diversity and/or differences between regions and globally among populations of mixed ancestry.

In Namibia, an ethnic group known as Rehoboth Basters, descend from historic liaisons between the Cape Colony Dutch and indigenous African women. The name Baster is derived from the Dutch word for 'bastard' (or 'crossbreed'). While some people consider this term demeaning, the Basters proudly use the term as an indication of their history. In the early 21st century, they number between 20,000 and 30,000 people. There are, of course, other people of mixed race in the country.

=== South Africa ===
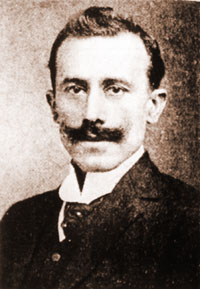
Abdullah Abdurahman

The Coloured / Cape Malay people from Africa are descendants of mixed ancestry, from the early 17th-century European colonizers namely Dutch, British and French intermixed with the indigenous Khoisan and Bantu tribes of that region, as well as intermixing with Asian slaves from Indonesia, Malaysia and India.

The intermixing of different races began in the Cape province of South Africa during the 17th and 18th centuries, the Dutch East India Company brought enslaved people from Asian regions, including; Indonesia, Malaysia and India these individuals were brought to the Cape Colony to work on farms, in households, as they were enslaved labourers. There is a significant genetic mixture of European, Indigenous African and (Indian) South Asian DNA in the modern ethnic group of Cape Coloureds. Thus forced into their own communities and therefore created a generational mix of people and are to date an ethnic group.

In addition to Indigenous African, European and South Asian ancestry, Coloured people had some portion of Spanish or Portuguese ancestry. In the early 19th century some immigrants from Brazil arrived in South Africa as sailors, traders or refugees, and some intermarried with local mixed race (Coloured) communities. Also the Canary Islands off the northwest coast of Africa, were a Spanish colony, and during the 17th and 18th centuries, the Dutch East India Company, and other European powers brought enslaved people from the Canary Islands to South Africa, particularly to the Cape Colony (now known as South Africa). The Dutch East India Company's ship Het Gelderland, which arrived at the Cape in 1671 with 174 slaves from the Canary Islands and The Portuguese ship, "Sao Jose" which was captured by the Dutch in 1713 and brought to the Cape with slaves from the Canary Islands. These enslaved people were forced to work on farms, in households, and in other industries and many were subjected to harsh conditions and treatment. The intermixing among European men and Spanish and Portuguese women's descendants are part of the diverse Coloured communities in South Africa. Spanish and Portuguese ancestry is not a dominant feature amongst the Coloured identity in South Africa, Namibia and Zimbabwe. Individual family histories and ancestry may vary widely while the African, European and Asian ancestry is dominant amongst Coloured people from Africa.

Based on the Population Registration Act to classify people, the government passed laws prohibiting mixed marriages. Many people who classified as belonging to the "Asian" category could legally intermarry with "mixed-race" people because they shared the same nomenclature. The use of the term Coloured has changed over the course of history. For instance, in the first census after the South African war (1912), Indians were counted as 'Coloured'. Before and after this war, they were counted as 'Asiatic'. Zimbabwean Coloureds were descended from Shona or Ndebele mixing with British and Afrikaner (ethnic Dutch) settlers along with Arab slaves.

Griqua, on the other hand, are descendants of Khoekhoe, San, and Afrikaner trekboers. The Griqua were subjected to an ambiguity of other creole people within Southern African social order. According to Nurse and Jenkins (1975), the leader of this "mixed" group, Adam Kok I, was a former slave of the Dutch governor. He was manumitted and provided land outside Cape Town in the eighteenth century. With territories beyond the Dutch East India Company administration, Kok provided refuge to deserting soldiers, refugee slaves, and remaining members of various Khoikhoi tribes.

=== Afro-European ethnicities ===
- Akus
- Americo-Liberians
- Amaros
- Fernandinos
- Gold Coast Euro-Africans
- Saro people
- Sherbro Hubris
- Sherbro Tuckers
- Sherbro Caulkers
- Sherbro Rogers
- Sherbro Clevelands
- Sierra Leone Creole people

== Latin America and the Caribbean ==
=== Mulattos in Jamaica ===
==== Origins and early status (17th–18th century) ====
The mulatto class emerged as a distinct social group during the era of plantation slavery, when European men—often plantation owners or merchants—had children with enslaved African women. These mixed-race offspring were initially classified as enslaved, but some were granted freedom, particularly if their fathers acknowledged them.

By the late 18th century, free mulattos and other people of mixed race began petitioning for legal rights. The Jamaican Assembly, recognizing their growing numbers and economic contributions, gradually relaxed restrictions on property ownership, education, and political participation for this group. However, full-blooded Black Jamaicans remained largely excluded from these privileges. This was mainly due to discrimination based on skin color within the same racial group, or formally known as colorism today. Those who were not mixed and didnt have lighter skin were still treated as second class citizens and not afforded the same opportunities as their lighter counterparts. They were somewhat more socially acceptable due to their mixed heritage and lighter skin.

==== Legal and social advancements (19th century) ====
During the early 19th century, Jamaica's mulatto class gained greater access to wealth and education, particularly in urban centers like Kingston and Spanish Town. Laws were amended to allow free people of color to:

- Property ownership: By the late 18th century, elite mixed-race Jamaicans successfully petitioned the Assembly for the right to own land and establish businesses. This was partly due to concerns among colonial rulers about maintaining a loyal intermediary class between the white elite and the enslaved population.
- Education access: While formal education was largely reserved for whites, some mixed-race families gained access to schooling, particularly in urban centers like Kingston.
- Political participation: By 1831, free people of color were allowed to hold political offices, including positions as justices of the peace, aldermen, and school trustees. This marked a significant shift in their legal status.

Figures like George Stiebel, Jamaica's first recorded millionaire, exemplified the upward mobility of mulatto Jamaicans. His Afro-European heritage allowed him to navigate both Black and white social circles, though racial hierarchies still shaped his experiences.

Despite these advancements, full-blooded Black Jamaicans remained largely excluded from these privileges. The colonial government maintained strict racial hierarchies, ensuring that the majority of Black Jamaicans had limited access to land, education, and political power. Even after Emancipation in 1834, economic and social barriers persisted, reinforcing class divisions that shaped Jamaican society well into the 20th century.

==== Post-emancipation and class divisions (1834 – 20th century) ====
After Emancipation in 1834, the Mulatto class maintained a privileged position compared to formerly enslaved Black Jamaicans. Many Mulatto families had inherited wealth, land, and education, allowing them to dominate professions such as law, medicine, and commerce.

However, racial tensions persisted. The brown-skinned elite often distanced themselves from the Black working class, reinforcing colorism and class divisions. This dynamic was reflected in cultural attitudes, such as the preference for lighter-skinned women in social and romantic contexts—a phenomenon explored in historical studies on Jamaican beauty standards.

==== Political influence and legacy ====
By the 20th century, mulatto Jamaicans played a significant role in politics and governance. Many leaders, including Alexander Bustamante, had mixed ancestry and leveraged their status to appeal to both Black and white constituencies. However, the rise of Black consciousness movements, particularly under figures like Marcus Garvey, challenged the dominance of the Mulatto elite and pushed for greater racial unity.

==== The rise of labor movements (1930s–1940s) ====
By the 1930s, Jamaica's working class—predominantly Black—faced harsh economic conditions, including low wages and poor living standards. The Mulatto elite, while enjoying greater privileges than full-blooded Black Jamaicans, were often caught between the white colonial rulers and the growing demands of the Black labor force.

The 1938 labor uprisings marked a turning point. Workers across sugar estates, docks, and factories staged strikes and protests, demanding better wages and working conditions. This movement led to the formation of trade unions, including the Bustamante Industrial Trade Union (BITU), founded by Alexander Bustamante, and the National Workers Union (NWU), associated with Norman Manley. These unions became political powerhouses, shaping Jamaica's future governance.

==== The birth of political parties (1940s–1960s) ====
The labor movement directly influenced the formation of Jamaica's two major political parties:

- Jamaica Labour Party (JLP) (1943) – Founded by Bustamante, the JLP emerged from the labor movement, advocating for workers' rights and economic reforms.
- People's National Party (PNP) (1938) – Led by Norman Manley, the PNP focused on social justice, education, and land reform, appealing to the working class and intellectuals.

Both parties had mulatto leadership, but their approaches differed. The JLP, under Bustamante, maintained close ties with the business elite, while the PNP, under Manley, pushed for progressive policies that challenged colonial structures.

==== Post-independence struggles (1962–1980s) ====
After independence in 1962, Jamaica's political landscape was shaped by class tensions and the legacy of colonial racial hierarchies. The Mulatto elite, though influential, had to navigate growing Black consciousness movements, particularly under Michael Manley (PNP), who championed socialist policies in the 1970s.

The 1970s and 1980s saw intense political rivalry, with garrison politics emerging—where political parties controlled urban communities through patronage and, at times, violence. The Mulatto class, once dominant, saw its influence wane as Black nationalism reshaped Jamaica's political identity.

==== Legacy and modern implications ====
Today, Jamaica's labor movements continue to influence workers' rights and economic policies. The mulatto elite left a lasting impact on education, business, and governance. However, colorism and class divisions remain embedded in Jamaican society.

While the mulatto elite may not function as a formally distinct political class today, they remain overrepresented in Jamaican politics, particularly within the Jamaica Labour Party (JLP). This is a continuation of historical patterns where lighter-skinned individuals, often from wealthier backgrounds, have maintained political and economic influence.

Jamaica's color-class pyramid, which historically placed white elites at the top, mulattos in the middle, and Black Jamaicans at the bottom, has evolved but still shapes political representation. Studies on race and legitimacy in Jamaican politics highlight how racial identity continues to influence leadership dynamics, with Mulatto politicians often occupying key positions in government and business.

The JLP, founded by Alexander Bustamante, himself of mixed ancestry, has historically had strong ties to the business elite, which includes many lighter-skinned Jamaicans. This trend persists today, with several high-ranking officials in the JLP fitting this profile. While the People's National Party (PNP) has also had Mulatto leaders, it has traditionally positioned itself as more aligned with Black nationalist movements, particularly under figures like Michael Manley.

=== Mulattos in colonial Mexico ===
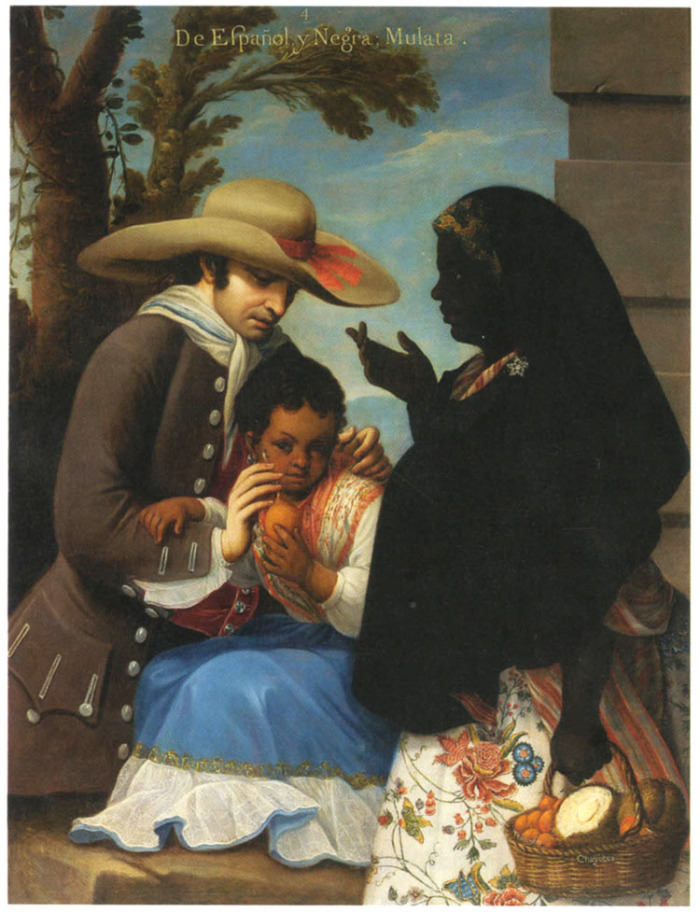
From Spaniard and Black woman, Coloured girl. Miguel Cabrera. Mexico 1763

Africans were transported by Spaniards slave traders to Mexico starting in the early 16th century. Offspring of Spaniards and African women resulted early on in mixed-race children, termed mulattos. In Spanish law, the status of the child followed that of the mother, so that despite having a Spanish parent, their offspring were enslaved. The label mulatto was recorded in official colonial documentation, so that marriage registers, censuses, and court documents allow research on different aspects of mulattos' lives. Although some legal documents simply label a person a mulatto/a, other designations occurred. In the sales of casta slaves in 17th-century Mexico City, official notaries recorded gradations of skin color in the transactions. These included mulato blanco or mulata blanca ('white mulatto'), for light-skinned slave. These were usually American-born slaves. Some said categorized persons i.e. mulata blanca used their light skin to their advantage if they escaped slavery. Mulatos blancos often emphasized their Spanish parentage, and considered themselves and were considered separate from negros or pardos and ordinary mulattos. Darker mulatto slaves were often termed mulatos prietos or sometimes mulatos cochos. In Chile, along with mulatos blancos, there were also españoles oscuros ('dark Spaniards').

There was considerable malleability and manipulation of racial labeling, including the seemingly stable category of mulatto. In a case that came before the Mexican Inquisition, a woman publicly identified as a mulatta was described by a Spanish priest, Diego Xaimes Ricardo Villavicencio, as "a white mulata with curly hair, because she is the daughter of a dark-skinned mulata and a Spaniard, and for her manner of dress she has flannel petticoats and a native blouse (huipil), sometimes silken, sometimes woolen. She wears shoes, and her natural and common language is not Spanish, but Chocho [an indigenous Mexican language], as she was brought up among Indians with her mother, from which she contracted the vice of drunkenness, to which she often succumbs, as Indians do, and from them she has also received the crime of [idolatry]." Community members were interrogated as to their understanding of her racial standing. Her mode of dress, very wavy hair and light skin confirmed for one witness that she was a mulatta. Ultimately though, her rootedness in the indigenous community persuaded the Inquisition that she was an India, and therefore outside of their jurisdiction. Even though the accused had physical features of a mulatta, her cultural category was more important. In colonial Latin America, mulato could also refer to an individual of mixed African and Native American ancestry, but the term zambo was more consistently used for that racial mixture.

Dominican friar Thomas Gage spent over a decade in the Viceroyalty of New Spain in the early 17th century; he converted to Anglicanism and later wrote of his travels, often disparaging Spanish colonial society and culture. In Mexico City, he observed in considerable detail the opulence of dress of women, writing that "The attire of this baser sort of people of blackamoors and mulattos (which are of a mixed nature, of Spaniards and blackamoors) is so light, and their carriage so enticing, that many Spaniards even of the better sort (who are too too [sic] prone to venery) disdain their wives for them... Most of these are or have been slaves, though love have set them loose, at liberty to enslave souls to sin and Satan."

In the late 18th century, some mixed-race persons sought legal "certificates of whiteness" (cédulas de gracias al sacar), in order to rise socially and practice professions. American-born Spaniards (criollos) sought to prevent the approval of such petitions, since the "purity" of their own whiteness would be in jeopardy. They asserted their "purity of blood" (limpieza de sangre) as white persons who had "always been known, held and commonly reputed to be white persons, Old Christians of the nobility, clean of all bad blood and without any mixture of commoner, Jew, Moor, Mulatto, or converso in any degree, no matter how remote." Spaniards both American- and Iberian-born discriminated against pardos and mulattos because of their "bad blood". One Cuban sought the grant of his petition in order to practice as a surgeon, a profession from which he was barred because of his mulatto designation. Royal laws and decrees prevented pardos and mulattos from serving as a public notary, lawyer, pharmacist, ordination to the priesthood, or graduation from university. Mulattas declared white could marry a Spaniard.

=== Mulattos in the modern era ===
==== Brazil ====
The term "Pardo" was first used by the Portuguese after their arrival in Brazil in 1500. The earliest reference comes from a letter by Pero Vaz de Caminha. Over time, the term evolved from the Latin word "Pardus" and was used to name birds called "Pardais" in the Middle East and the Americas. Currently, "Pardo" is officially used in Brazil by the IBGE(Brazilian Institute of Geography and Statistics) for the classification of color/race.

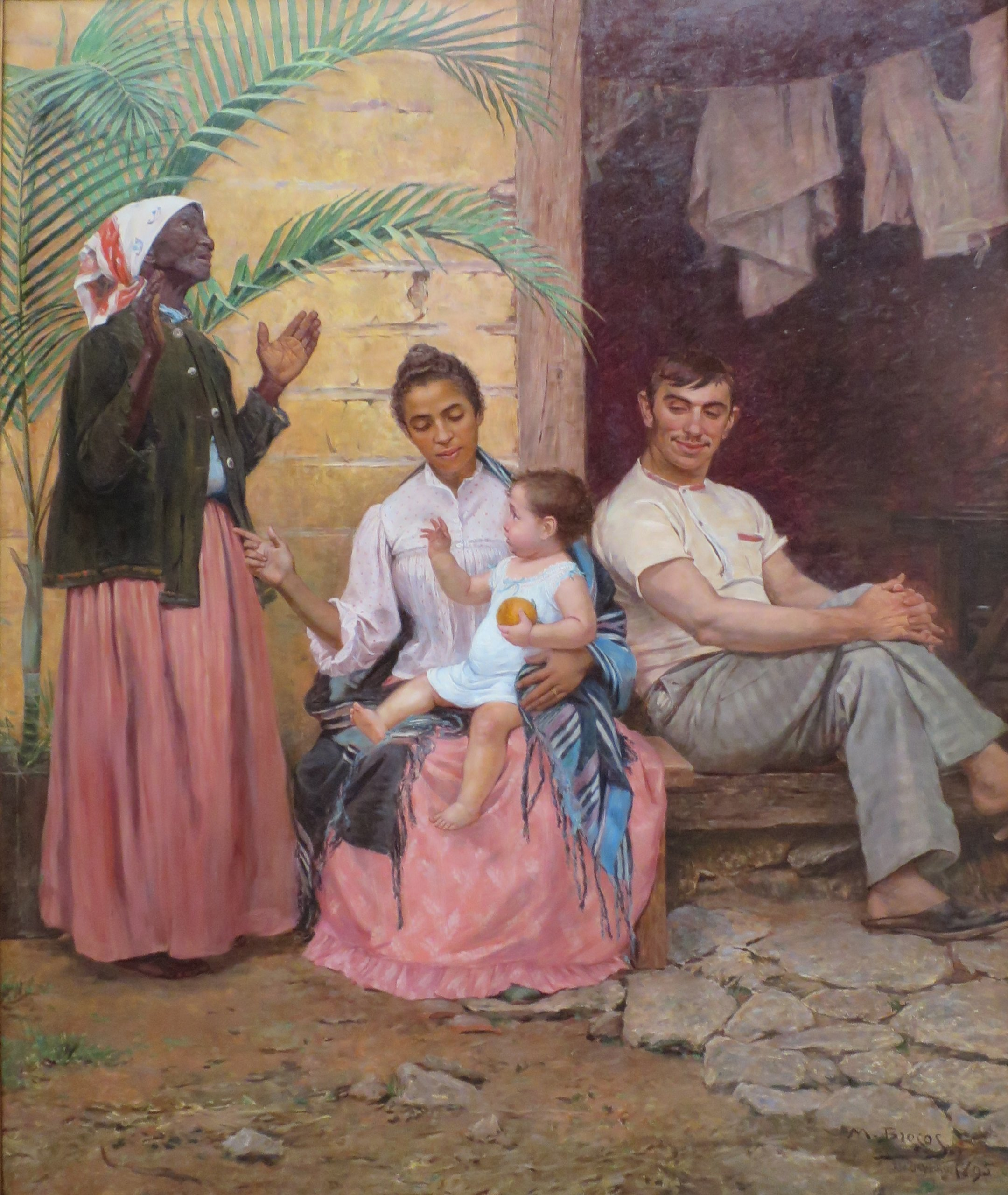
A Redenção de Cam (Redemption of Ham), by Galician painter Modesto Brocos, 1895, Museu Nacional de Belas Artes. (Brazil) The painting depicts a black grandmother, mulatta mother, white father and their quadroon child, hence three generations of hypergamy through racial whitening.

According to the IBGE 2020 census, 45,3% of Brazilians identified as pardo, a term for people of mixed backgrounds. Many mixed-race Brazilians have varying degrees of European, Amerindian and African ancestry. According to the Brazilian Institute of Geography and Statistics census 2006, some 42.6% of Brazilian identify as pardo, an increase over the 2000 census.

==== Haiti ====
Mulattos account for up to 5% of Haiti's population. In Haitian history, such mixed-race people, known in colonial times as free people of color, gained some education and property before the Revolution. In some cases, their white fathers arranged for multiracial sons to be educated in France and join the military, giving them an advance economically. Free people of color gained some social capital and political power before the Revolution, were influential during the Revolution and since then. The people of color have retained their elite position, based on education and social capital, that is apparent in the political, economic and cultural hierarchy in present-day Haiti. Numerous leaders throughout Haiti's history have been people of color.

Many Haitian mulattos were slaveholders and often actively participated in the oppression of the black majority. Some Dominican mulattos were also slave owners.

The Haitian Revolution was started by mulattos. The subsequent struggle within Haiti between the mulattos led by André Rigaud and the black Haitians led by Toussaint Louverture devolved into the War of Knives. With secret aid from the United States, Toussaint eventually won the conflict and made himself ruler of the entire island of Hispaniola. Napoleon ordered for Charles Leclerc and a substantial army to put down the rebellion; Leclerc seized Toussaint in 1802 and deported him to France, where he died in prison a year later. Leclerc was succeeded by General Rochambeau. With reinforcements from France and Poland, Rochambeau began a bloody campaign against the mulattos and intensified operations against the blacks, importing bloodhounds to track and kill them. Thousands of black POW and suspects were chained to cannonballs and tossed into the sea. Historians of the Haitian Revolution credit Rochambeau's brutal tactics for uniting black and mulatto soldiers against the French.

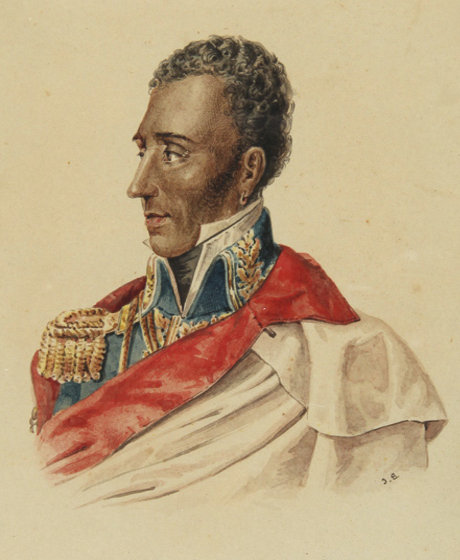
Jean-Pierre Boyer, the mulatto ruler of Haiti (1818–43)

In 1806, Haiti divided into a black-controlled north and a mulatto-ruled south. Haitian President Jean-Pierre Boyer, the son of a Frenchman and a former African slave, managed to unify a divided Haiti but excluded blacks from power. In 1847, a black military officer named Faustin Soulouque was made president, with the mulattos supporting him; but, instead of proving a tool in the hands of the senators, he showed a strong will, and, although by his antecedents belonging to the mulatto party, he began to attach the blacks to his interest. The mulattos retaliated by conspiring; but Soulouque began to decimate his enemies by confiscation, proscriptions, and executions. The black soldiers began a general massacre in Port-au-Prince, which ceased only after the French consul, Charles Reybaud, threatened to order the landing of marines from the men-of-war in the harbor.

===== Dominican Republic =====
Soulouque considered the neighbouring Dominican Republic's white and mulatto rulers as his "natural" enemies. He invaded the Dominican Republic in March 1849, but was defeated at the Battle of Las Carreras by Pedro Santana (Note: General Pedro Santana, who also held the Spanish noble name Marquess de las Carreras.) near Ocoa on 21 April and compelled to retreat. Haitian strategy was ridiculed by the American press:

[At the first encounter] ... a division of negro troops of Faustin ran, and their commander, Gen. Garat, was killed. The main body, eighteen thousand troops, under the Emperor, encountered four hundred Dominicans with a field piece, and notwithstanding the disparity of force, the latter charged and caused the Haytiens to flee in every direction ... Faustin came very near falling into the enemy's hands. They were once within a few feet of him, and he was only saved by Thirlonge and other officers of his staff, several of whom lost their lives. The Dominicans pursued the retreating Haytiens some miles until they were checked and driven back by the Garde Nationale of Port-au-Prince, commanded by Robert Gateau, the auctioneer.

The Haitians were unable to ward off a series of Dominican navy reprisal raids along Haiti's south coast, launched by Dominican president Buenaventura Báez. Despite the failure of the Dominican campaign, Soulouque caused himself to be proclaimed emperor on 26 August 1849, under the name of Faustin I. He was called a rey de farsa (clown emperor) by the Dominicans. Toward the close of 1855, he invaded the Dominican Republic again at the head of an army of 30,000 men, but was again defeated by Santana, and barely escaped being captured. His treasure and crown fell into the hands of the enemy. Soulouque was ousted in a military coup led by mulatto General Fabre Geffrard in 1858–59.

In the eastern two-thirds of Hispaniola, the mulattos were an ever-growing majority group, and in essence they took over the entire Dominican Republic, with no organized black opposition. Many of its rulers and famous figures were mulattos, such as Gregorio Luperón, Ulises Heureaux, José Joaquín Puello, Matías Ramón Mella, Buenaventura Báez, and Rafael Trujillo. The Dominican Republic has been described as the only true mulatto country in the world. Pervasive Dominican racism, based on rejection of African ancestry, has led to many assaults against the large Haitian immigrant community, the most lethal of which was the 1937 parsley massacre. Approximately 5,000–67,000 men, women, children, babies and elderly, who were selected by their skin color, were massacred with machetes, or were thrown to sharks.

==== Dominican Republic ====
Mixed Dominicans, also referred to as mulatto, mestizo or historically quadroon, are Dominicans who are of mixed racial ancestry. Dominican Republic has many racial terms and some are used differently than in other countries, for example Mestizo signifies any racial mix and not solely a European/indigenous mix like in other Latin American countries, while Indio describes people of skin tones between white and black and has nothing to do with native peoples. Representing 73.9% of the Dominican Republic's population, they are by far the single largest racial grouping of the country. Mixed Dominicans are the descendants from the racial integration between the Europeans, Native Americans, and later the Africans. They have a total population of approximately 8 million.

The Dominican Republic was the site of the first European settlement in the Americas, the Captaincy General of Santo Domingo founded in 1493. After the arrival of Europeans and the founding of the colony, African people were imported to the island. The fusion of European, native Taino, and African influences contributed to the development of present-day Dominican culture. From the start of the colonial period in the 1500s, Miscegenation (Mestizaje), intermixing of races particularly Spanish settlers, native Tainos, and imported Africans (free or enslaved), was very strong. In fact, colonial Santo Domingo had higher amount of mixing and lesser racial tensions in comparison to other colonies, even other Spanish colonies, this was due to the fact that for most of its colonial period, Santo Domingo was a poorer colony where even the majority of the white Spanish settlers were poor, which helped foster a relatively peaceful racial atmosphere, allowing for growth in its mixed race population and racial fluidity. Santo Domingo as a colony was used a military base and had an economy based on Cattle ranching, which was a far less labor-intensive than the more common plantation slavery at the time. By the 1700s, the majority of the population was mixed race, forming the basis of the Dominican ethnicity as a distinct people well before independence was achieved. During colonial times, mixed-race/mulatto Dominicans had a lot of influence, they were instrumental in the independence period and the founding of the nation. Many Dominican presidents were mulatto, and mulatto Dominicans have had influence in every aspect of Dominican culture and society.

According to recent genealogical DNA studies of the Dominican population, the genetic makeup is predominantly European and African, with a lesser degree of Native American ancestry. The average Dominican DNA of the founder population is estimated to be 73% European, 10% Native, and 17% African. After the Haitian and Afro-Caribbean migrations the overall percentage changed to 57% European, 8% Native and 35% African. Due to mixed race Dominicans (and most Dominicans in general) being a mix of mainly European and African, with lesser amounts of indigenous Taino, they can accurately be described as "Mulatto" or "Tri-racial". Dominican Republic have several informal terms to loosely describe a person's degree of racial admixture, Mestizo means any type of mixed ancestry unlike in other Latin American countries it describes specifically a European/native mix, Indio describes mixed race people whose skin color is between white and black.

In Dominican Republic and some other Latin American countries, it can sometimes be difficult to determine the exact number of racial groups, because the lines between whites and lighter multiracials are very blurry, which is also true between blacks and darker multiracials. As race in Dominican Republic acts as a continuum of white—mulatto—black and not as clear cut as in places like the United States. And many times in the same family, there can be people of different colors and racial phenotypes who are blood related, this is due to the large amounts of interracial mixing for hundreds of years in Dominican Republic and the Spanish Caribbean in general, allowing for high amounts of genetic diversity. The majority of the Dominican population is tri-racial, with nearly all Dominicans having Taíno Native American ancestry along with European and African ancestry. European ancestry in the mixed population typically ranges between 50% and 60% on average, while African ancestry ranges between 30% and 40%, and the Native ancestry usually ranges between 5% and 10%. European and Native ancestry tends to be strongest in cities and towns of the north-central Cibao region, and generally in the mountainous interior of the country. African ancestry is strongest in coastal areas, the southeast plain, and the border regions.

==== Puerto Rico ====
Although the average Puerto Rican is of mixed-race, few actually identified as multiracial ("two or more races") in the 2010 census; only 3.3% did so. They more often identified with their predominant heritage or phenotype. However, in the 2020 census, the amount of Puerto Ricans identifying as multiracial went up to 49.8% and an additional 25.5% identified as "some other race", showing a marked change in the way Puerto Ricans view themselves. This may show that Puerto Ricans are now more open to embracing all sides of their mixed-race heritage and do not view themselves as part of the standard race dynamic in the United States hence the high number of people identifying as "some other race", a similar phenomenon went on in the mainland United States with the overall US Hispanic/Latino population. Most have significant ancestry from two or more of the founding source populations of Spaniards, Africans, and Tainos, although Spanish ancestry is predominant in a majority of the population. Similar to many other Latin American ethnic groups, Puerto Ricans are multi-generationally mixed race, though most are European dominant in ancestry, Puerto Ricans who are "evenly mixed" can accurately be described "Mulatto", "Quadroon", or Tri-racial very similar to mixed populations in Cuba and Dominican Republic. Overall, Puerto Ricans are European-dominant Tri-racials, however there are many with near even European and African ancestry. According to the National Geographic Genographic Project, "the average Puerto Rican individual carries 12% Native American, 65% West Eurasian (Mediterranean, Northern European and/or Middle Eastern) and 20% African DNA."

Studies have shown that the racial ancestry mixture of the average Puerto Rican (regardless of racial self-identity) is about 64% European, 21% African, and 15% Native Taino, with European ancestry strongest on the west side of the island and West African ancestry strongest on the east side, and the levels of Taino ancestry (which, according to some research, ranges from about 5%-35%) generally highest in the southwest of the island.

A study of a sample of 96 healthy self-identified White Puerto Ricans and self-identified Black Puerto Ricans in the U.S. showed that, although all carried a contribution from all 3 ancestral populations (European, African, and Amerindian), the proportions showed significant variation. Depending on individuals, although often correlating with their self-identified race, African ancestry ranged from less than 10% to over 50%, while European ancestry ranged from under 20% to over 80%. Amerindian ancestry showed less fluctuation, generally hovering between 5% and 20% irrespective of self-identified race.

Many Spaniard men took indigenous Taino and West African wives and in the first centuries of the Spanish colonial period the island was overwhelmingly racially mixed. Under Spanish rule, mass immigration shifted the ethnic make-up of the island, as a result of the Royal Decree of Graces of 1815. Puerto Rico went from being two-thirds black and mulatto in the beginning of the 19th century, to being nearly 80% white by the middle of the 20th century. This was compounded by more flexible attitudes to race under Spanish rule, as epitomized by the Regla del Sacar. Under Spanish rule, Puerto Rico had laws such as Regla del Sacar or Gracias al Sacar, which allowed persons of mixed ancestry to pay a fee to be classified as white, which was the opposite of "one-drop rule" in US society after the American Civil War.

==== Cuba ====
In the 2012 Census of Cuba, 26.6% (2.97 million) of the Cubans self-identified as mulatto or mestizo. But the percentage multiracial/mulatto make up varies widely, from as low as 26% to as high as 51%. Unlike, the two other Spanish Caribbean islands (Dominican Republic and Puerto Rico) where nearly everyone even most self-proclaimed whites and blacks are mixed to varying degrees, in Cuba there are significant pure or nearly pure European and African populations. Multi-racials/Mulattos are widespread throughout Cuba. The DNA average for the Cuban population is 72% European, 23% African, and 5% indigenous, though among mulatto Cubans the European and African ancestry is more even.

Prior to the 20th century, majority of the Cuban population was of mixed race descent to varying degrees, with pure Spaniards or criollos being a significant minority. Between 1902 and 1933, some 750,000 Spaniards migrated to Cuba from Europe, which changed the racial demographics of the region rapidly. Many of the newly arrived Spanish migrants did not intermix with the native Cuban population, unlike the earlier colonial settlers and conquistadors who intermixed with Tainos and Africans at large scale rates. Self identified "white" Cubans with colonial roots on the island usually have Amerindian and or African admixture to varying degrees, as well as self identified "black" Cubans with colonial roots having varying degrees of European and or Amerindian admixture.

== United States ==
=== Colonial and Antebellum eras ===
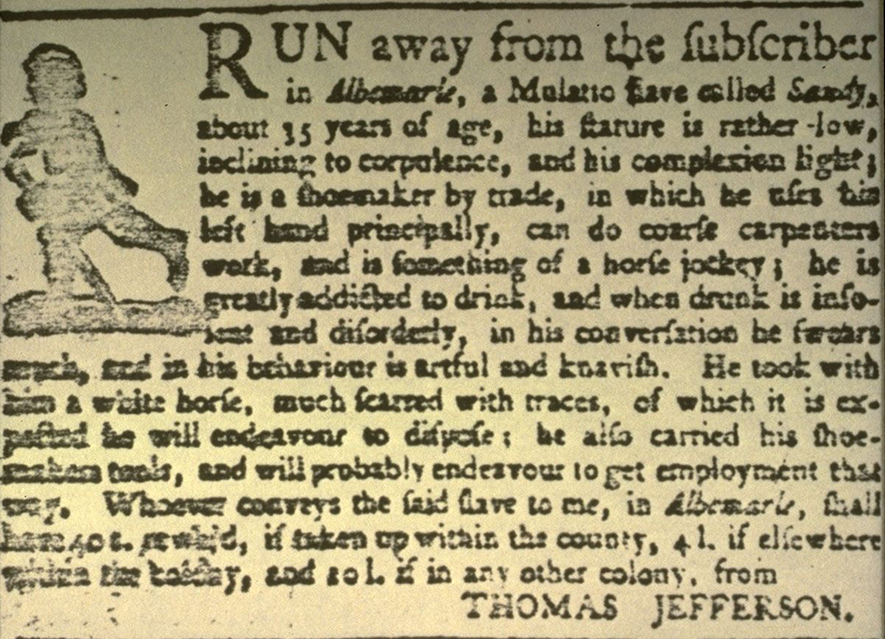
Advertisement in the Virginia Gazette placed by Thomas Jefferson offering a reward for his escaped slave named Sandy who was defined as "mulatto".

Historians have documented sexual abuse of enslaved women during the colonial and post-revolutionary slavery times by white men in power: planters, their sons before marriage, overseers, etc., which resulted in many multiracial children born into slavery. Starting with Virginia in 1662, colonies adopted the principle of partus sequitur ventrem in slave law, which said that children born in the colony were born into the status of their mother. Thus, children born to slave mothers were born into slavery, regardless of who their fathers were and whether they were baptized as Christians. Children born to white mothers were free, even if they were mixed-race. Children born to free mixed-race mothers were also free.

Paul Heinegg has documented that most of the free people of color listed in the 1790–1810 censuses in the Upper South were descended from unions and marriages during the colonial period in Virginia between white women, who were free or indentured servants, and African or African American men, servant, slave or free. In the early colonial years, such working-class people lived and worked closely together, and slavery was not as much of a racial caste. Slave law had established that children in the colony took the status of their mothers. This meant that multi-racial children born to white women were born free. The colony required them to serve lengthy indentures if the woman was not married, but nonetheless, numerous individuals with African ancestry were born free, and formed more free families. Over the decades, many of these free people of color became leaders in the African-American community; others married increasingly into the white community. His findings have been supported by DNA studies and other contemporary researchers as well.

A daughter born to a South Asian father and Irish mother in Maryland in 1680, both of whom probably came to the colony as indentured servants, was classified as a "mulatto" and sold into slavery.

Historian F. James Davis says,

Rapes occurred, and many slave women were forced to submit regularly to white males or suffer harsh consequences. However, slave girls often courted a sexual relationship with the master, or another male in the family, as a way of gaining distinction among the slaves, avoiding field work, and obtaining special jobs and other favored treatment for their mixed children (Reuter, 1970:129). Sexual contacts between the races also included prostitution, adventure, concubinage, and sometimes love. In rare instances, where free blacks were concerned, there was marriage (Bennett, 1962:243–68).

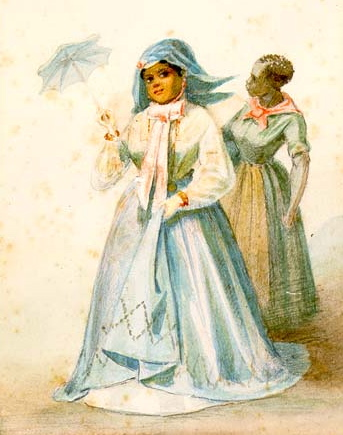
Creole woman with black servant, New Orleans, 1867

Historically in the American South, the term mulatto was also applied at times to persons with mixed Native American and African American ancestry. For example, a 1705 Virginia statute reads as follows:

"And for clearing all manner of doubts which hereafter may happen to arise upon the construction of this act, or any other act, who shall be accounted a mulatto, Be it enacted and declared, and it is hereby enacted and declared, That the child of an Indian and the child, grand child, or great grand child, of a negro shall be deemed, accounted, held and taken to be a mulatto."

However, southern colonies began to prohibit Indian slavery in the eighteenth century, so, according to their own laws, even mixed-race children born to Native American women should be considered free. The societies did not always observe this distinction.

Certain Native American tribes of the Inocoplo family in Texas referred to themselves as "mulatto". In the United States, due to the influence and laws making slavery a racial caste, and later practices of hypodescent, white colonists and settlers tended to classify persons of mixed African and Native American ancestry as black, regardless of how they identified themselves, or sometimes as Black Indians. But many tribes had matrilineal kinship systems and practices of absorbing other peoples into their cultures. Multiracial children born to Native American mothers were customarily raised in her family and specific tribal culture. Federally recognized Native American tribes have insisted that identity and membership is related to culture rather than race, and that individuals brought up within tribal culture are fully members, regardless of whether they also have some European or African ancestry. Many tribes have had mixed-race members who identify primarily as members of the tribes.

If the multiracial children were born to slave women (generally of at least partial African descent), they were classified under slave law as slaves. This was to the advantage of slaveowners, as Indian slavery had been abolished. If mixed-race children were born to Native American mothers, they should be considered free, but sometimes slaveholders kept them in slavery anyway. Multiracial children born to slave mothers were generally raised within the African-American community and considered "black".

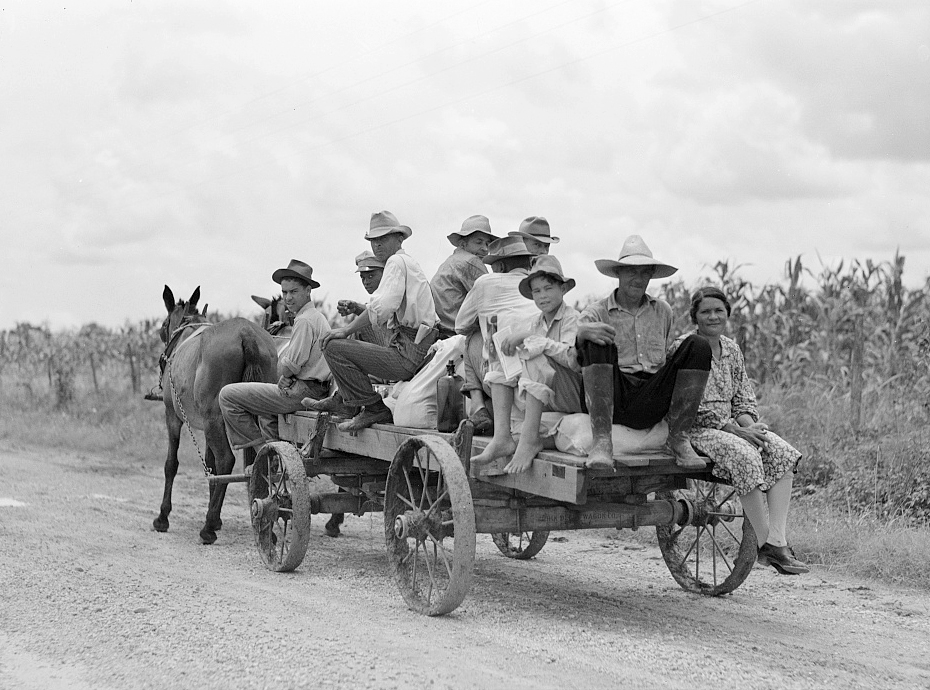
"Mulattos returning from town with groceries and supplies near Melrose, Natchitoches Parish, Louisiana." Marion Post Wolcott, Farm Security Administration, July 1940

=== California ===
The first pioneers of Alta California were of mulatto ancestry.

=== Louisiana ===
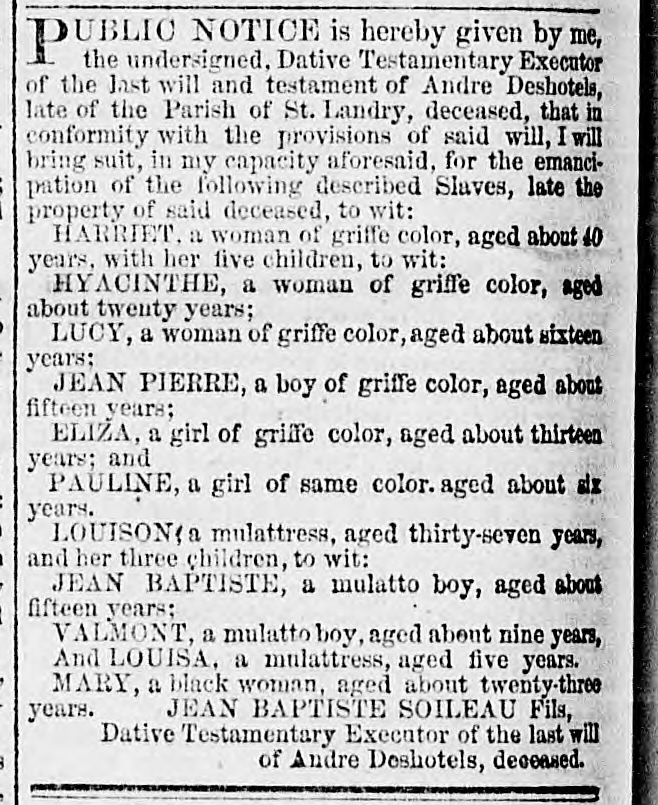
Three different race classifications appear in this public notice by the executor of the last will of Andre Deshotels, deceased, regarding emancipation of his former slaves. (Opelousas Patriot, St. Landry Parish, November 3, 1855, via Chronicling America digital newspaper archive)

The American Guide to Louisiana, published by the Federal Writers Project in 1941, included a breakdown of traditional race classifications in that region, stating "The following elaborate terminology, now no longer in use because of the lack of genealogical records upon which to base finely drawn blood distinctions, was once employed to differentiate between types according to diminution of Negro blood." (Original orthography preserved.)

Term	Parentage	"Percentage of Afro People blood"
Sacatro	Black and Griffe	87.5
Griffe	Black and Mulatto	75
Marabon	Mulatto and Griffe	62.5
Mulatto	Black and white	50
Tierceron	Mulatto and Quadroon	37.5
Quadroon	White and Mulatto	25
Octoroon	White and Quadroon	12.5

A 1916 history called The Mulatto in the United States reported two other archaic race-classification systems:

From Frederick Law Olmsted's A Journey to the Seaboard Slave States (1854)
Term	Parentage
Sacatra	griffe and negress
Griffe	Negro and mulatto
Marabon	mulatto and griffe
Mulatto	white and Negro
Quadroon	white and mulatto
Metif	white and Quadroon
Meamelouc	white and metif
Quarteron	white and meamelouc
Sang-mele	white and quarteron

From Charles Davenport's Heredity of Skin Color in Negro-White Crosses (1910)
Term	Parentage
Mulatto	Negro and white
Quadroon	mulatto and white
Octoroon	quadroon and white
Cascos	mulatto and mulatto
Sambo	mulatto and Negro
Mango	sambo and Negro
Mustifee	octoroon and white
Mustifino	mustifee and white

=== Contemporary era ===
Mulatto was used as an official census racial category in the United States, to acknowledge multiracial persons, until 1930. (In the early 20th century, several southern states had adopted the one-drop rule as law, and southern Congressmen pressed the US Census Bureau to drop the mulatto category: they wanted all persons to be classified as "black" or "white".)

Since 2000, persons responding to the census have been allowed to identify as having more than one type of ethnic ancestry.

Mulatto (Biracial in the U.S.) populations come from various sources. Firstly, the average ancestral DNA of African Americans is about 90% African, 9% European, and 1% indigenous. Lighter skinned (African descendant Americans) are usually "more mixed" than the average African American, with the white ancestors sometimes being several generations back, which gives them a multiracial phenotype. Some of these lighter African Americans have abandoned the black identity and started to identify as multiracial. Many small isolate mixed race groups, such as for example Louisiana Creole people, got absorbed into the overall African American population. There are also growing numbers of black/white interracial couples and multiracial people of recent origins– parents being of different races. Many immigrants who are racially Mulattos, have come to the United States from countries like Dominican Republic, being most prevalent in cities like New York and Miami.

== Colonial references ==
- Castizo
- Half-breed
- Métis
- Quadroon

== See also ==
- Multiracial people
- Interracial marriage
- Biracial and multiracial identity development
- Multiracialism
- Ethnic groups in Latin America
- Mixed Dominicans
- Dominican people
- Puerto Ricans
- Cubans
- Spanish Caribbean
- Moreno Venezuelans
- Cape Verdeans
- Mixed-race Brazilian
- Mixed Race Day, holiday in Brazil celebrating mixed race heritage
- Multiracial Americans
- Passing (racial identity)
- One-drop rule, United States racial classification
- High yellow
- Redbone (ethnicity)
- Creole people
- Melungeon
- Dominickers
- Mulatto Haitians
- Marabou (ethnicity)
- Dougla people
- Multiracial Antiguans and Barbudans
- Mixed-race Caymanians
- Multiracial Ugandans in Uganda
- Coloureds
- Rhineland Bastard
- Cafres
- Cassare, a marriage alliance between European traders and African rulers.
- Mixed White and Black African people in the United Kingdom
- Mischling
- Tragic mulatto
- Blanqueamiento
- African diaspora in the Americas
- Afro-Latin Americans
- Afro-Arabs
- Black Europeans of African ancestry
- African admixture in Europe
- History of Latin America
- Colorism in the Caribbean
- Discrimination based on skin color
- Mixed twins
- Race and genetics
- Race of the future
- Historical race concepts
- Signare
- Seychellois Creole people
- Goffal
