= Izquierdo =

Izquierdo (Spanish pronunciation: [iθˈkjeɾðo, is-]; Spanish for "left") is a Spanish surname. Notable people with the surname include:

- Adelaida Abarca Izquierdo (1923–?), Spanish Republican political activist
- Elisa Izquierdo (1989–1995), American girl beaten to death by her mother
- Hank Izquierdo (1931–2015), Cuban baseball player
- Hansel Izquierdo (born 1977), Cuban baseball olayer
- Ivan Izquierdo, Argentine Brazilian scientist and neurobiologist
- José Heriberto Izquierdo Mena (born 1992), Colombian footballer
- José Izquierdo (footballer born 1980) (born 1980), Spanish footballer
- Jose Izquierdo Encarnacion 19th Secretary of State of the Commonwealth of Puerto Rico
- J. P. Izquierdo (born 1969), Canadian football player
- Juan Izquierdo (1997–2024), Uruguayan footballer
- Julio Izquierdo Labrado (born 1958), Spanish writer and doctor of history
- Lilia Izquierdo (born 1967), Cuban volleyball player
- Manuel Izquierdo (1928–2009), sculptor and woodcut artist
- María Izquierdo (artist) (1902–1955), Mexican painter
- María Izquierdo (actress) (born 1960), Chilean actress
- María Izquierdo Rojo (born 1946), Spanish politician
- Miguel Ramón Izquierdo (1919–2007), Spanish politician
- Rafael de Izquierdo y Gutiérrez, Spanish military officer, Governor-General of the Philippines 1871–1873
- Vicente Guillén Izquierdo (born 1958), Spanish politician

== See also ==
- Izquierdo (crater), crater on Mercury located to the east of Beagle Rupes and Sveinsdóttir crater
