= Demographics of Uganda =

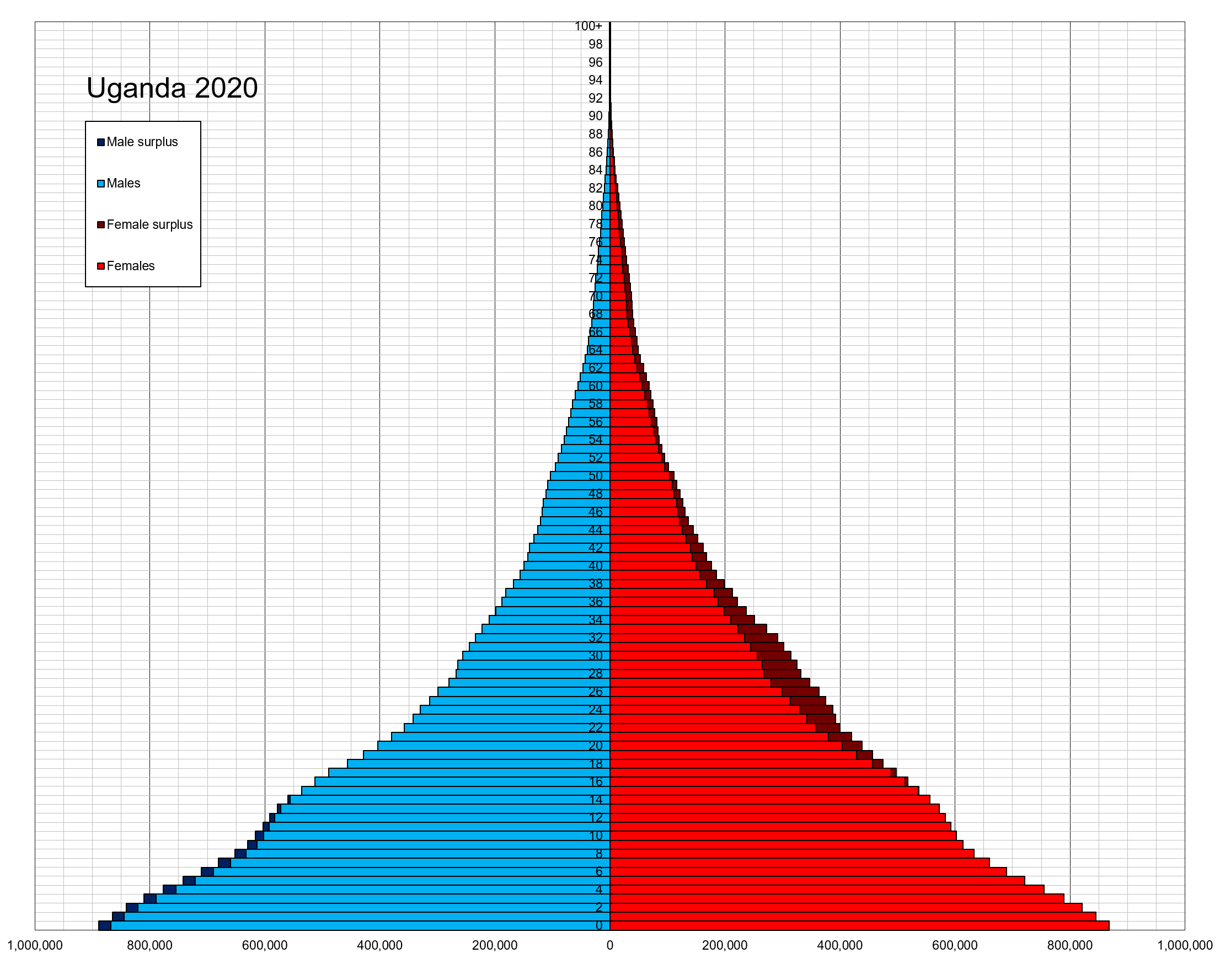
- Population pyramid of Uganda in 2020
- Population: 45,935,046 (2024 census)
- Growth rate: 2.9% (2024 census)
- Birth rate: 40.94 births/1,000 population (2022 est.)
- Death rate: 5.02 deaths/1,000 population (2022 est.)
- Life expectancy: 68.96 years
  - male: 66.71 years
  - female: 71.27 years
- Fertility rate: 4.5 children born/woman (2024 est.)
- Infant mortality: 30.45 deaths/1,000 live births
- Net migration rate: -3.26 migrant(s)/1,000 population (2022 est.)

Age structure
- 0–14 years: 48.21%
- 65 and over: 2.38%

Sex ratio
- Total: 0.96 male(s)/female (2024 census)
- At birth: 1.03 male(s)/female
- Under 15: 1.03 male(s)/female
- 65 and over: 0.71 male(s)/female

Nationality
- Nationality: Ugandan

Language
- Official: English

Demographic features of the population of Uganda include population density, ethnicity, education level, health of the populace, economic status, religious affiliations and others.

== Population ==
Census population
Year	Pop.	±% p.a.
1948	4,958,520	—
1959	6,536,616	+2.54%
1969	9,548,847	+3.86%
1980	12,636,179	+2.58%
1991	16,671,705	+2.55%
2002	24,442,084	+3.54%
2014	34,856,813	+3.00%
2024	45,900,000	+2.79%

Demographics development according to the United Nations

According to the 2022 revision of the World Population Prospects the total population was 45,853,778 in 2021, compared to only 5,158,000 in 1950. The proportion of children below the age of 15 in 2015 was 48.1 percent, 49.4 percent was between 15 and 65 years of age, while 2.5 percent was 65 years or older.

	Total population ( × 1000)	Population percentage		
	Total population ( × 1000)	aged 0–14	aged 15–64	aged 65+
1950	5,158	43.1%	54.0%	3.0%
1955	5,899	45.1%	52.1%	2.8%
1960	6,788	45.9%	51.5%	2.6%
1965	8,014	46.6%	50.9%	2.6%
1970	9,446	46.9%	50.5%	2.6%
1975	10,827	47.3%	50.0%	2.6%
1980	12,548	47.6%	49.7%	2.6%
1985	14,631	47.8%	49.6%	2.7%
1990	17,384	48.0%	49.3%	2.7%
1995	20,413	48.5%	48.8%	2.7%
2000	23,758	48.7%	48.6%	2.7%
2005	28,042	48.8%	48.7%	2.5%
2010	33,149	49.1%	48.5%	2.5%
2014 Census Results	34,856	47.9%	49.2%	2.7%

Population by Sex and Age Group (Census 27.VIII.2014):

Age group	Male	Female	Total	%
Total	16 897 849	17 736 801	34 634 650	100
0–4	3 173 950	2 957 078	6 131 028	17.70
5–9	2 834 456	2 717 222	5 551 678	16.03
10–14	2 462 789	2 457 654	4 920 443	14.21
15–19	1 917 797	2 038 836	3 956 633	11.42
20–24	1 444 438	1 744 173	3 188 611	9.21
25–29	1 143 467	1 342 709	2 486 176	7.18
30–34	908 447	1 043 292	1 951 739	5.64
35–39	726 355	809 482	1 535 837	4.43
40–44	617 034	655 383	1 272 417	3.67
45–49	452 081	469 043	921 124	2.66
50–54	371 126	436 977	808 103	2.33
55–59	224 765	255 519	480 284	1.39
60–64	195 283	244 770	440 053	1.27
65–69	136 107	165 043	301 150	0.87
70–74	115 862	161 374	277 236	0.80
75–79	69 095	81 378	150 473	0.43
80–84	51 871	79 398	131 269	0.38
85–89	21 572	30 204	51 776	0.15
90–94	15 125	22 046	37 171	0.11
95+	16 229	25 220	41 449	0.12
Age group	Male	Female	Total	Percent
0–14	8 471 195	8 131 954	16 603 149	47.94
15–64	8 000 793	9 040 184	17 040 977	49.20
65+	425 861	564 663	990 524	2.86

Population Estimates by Sex and Age Group (01.VII.2020) (Based on the results of the 2014 Population Census.):

Age group	Male	Female	Total	%
Total	20 428 000	21 156 000	41 584 000	100
0–4	3 610 000	3 519 000	7 129 000	17.14
5–9	3 150 000	2 964 000	6 114 000	14.70
10–14	2 842 000	2 705 000	5 547 000	13.34
15–19	2 503 000	2 478 000	4 981 000	11.98
20–24	1 978 000	2 074 000	4 052 000	9.74
25–29	1 480 000	1 764 000	3 244 000	7.80
30–34	1 155 000	1 378 000	2 533 000	6.09
35–39	913 000	1 059 000	1 972 000	4.74
40–44	718 000	814 000	1 533 000	3.69
45–49	605 000	656 000	1 261 000	3.03
50–54	446 000	468 000	914 000	2.20
55–59	357 000	421 000	778 000	1.87
60–64	221 000	259 000	480 000	1.15
65–69	170 000	217 000	387 000	0.93
70–74	115 000	144 000	259 000	0.62
75–79	83 000	119 000	202 000	0.49
80+	81 000	116 000	197 000	0.47
Age group	Male	Female	Total	Percent
0–14	9 602 000	9 188 000	18 790 000	45.19
15–64	10 377 000	11 372 000	21 749 000	52.30
65+	449 000	596 000	1 045 000	2.51

=== United Nations population projections ===
Numbers are in thousands.

UN medium var	2050	101,873

=== Refugee population ===
By October 2025, Uganda hosted roughly 1.95 million refugees, more than any other country in Africa. Most are rural groups mainly from South Sudan and the Democratic Republic of the Congo, as well as from Somalia, Burundi, and Rwanda. From 2023, more than 90,000 refugees fleeing the civil war in Sudan have entered.

== Vital statistics ==
Registration of births and deaths in Uganda is not yet complete. The Population Division of the United Nations Department of Economic and Social Affairs prepared the following estimates.

Year	Live births per year	Deaths per year	Natural change per year	CBR*	CDR*	NC*	TFR*	IMR*
1950	302,000	144,000	157,000	52.4	25.1	27.4	6.65	148.5
1951	308,000	147,000	161,000	52.1	24.9	27.2	6.66	147.2
1952	315,000	148,000	167,000	51.9	24.4	27.5	6.68	144.5
1953	322,000	149,000	173,000	51.6	23.8	27.7	6.71	141.9
1954	329,000	150,000	179,000	51.2	23.3	27.9	6.73	139.7
1955	335,000	150,000	185,000	50.7	22.7	28.0	6.76	137.4
1956	342,000	150,000	192,000	50.3	22.1	28.2	6.79	135.2
1957	349,000	149,000	199,000	49.9	21.4	28.5	6.83	132.9
1958	356,000	148,000	207,000	49.5	20.6	28.9	6.87	130.7
1959	364,000	148,000	217,000	49.2	20.0	29.2	6.92	128.7
1960	371,000	147,000	224,000	48.7	19.3	29.4	6.94	127.0
1961	379,000	147,000	233,000	48.4	18.7	29.7	6.97	125.3
1962	389,000	147,000	242,000	48.2	18.1	30.0	7.00	123.7
1963	399,000	148,000	252,000	48.0	17.8	30.3	7.02	121.9
1964	411,000	149,000	262,000	48.0	17.4	30.6	7.05	120.3
1965	425,000	152,000	273,000	48.1	17.2	31.0	7.09	118.7
1966	440,000	156,000	285,000	48.4	17.1	31.3	7.12	117.4
1967	457,000	157,000	299,000	48.6	16.7	31.9	7.15	115.5
1968	474,000	161,000	313,000	48.9	16.6	32.3	7.19	114.1
1969	489,000	164,000	325,000	48.8	16.4	32.4	7.16	112.9
1970	506,000	169,000	337,000	49.0	16.4	32.6	7.19	112.2
1971	522,000	192,000	330,000	49.1	18.1	31.0	7.20	116.2
1972	535,000	198,000	338,000	49.0	18.1	30.9	7.22	116.4
1973	546,000	202,000	343,000	48.8	18.1	30.7	7.22	114.7
1974	558,000	211,000	347,000	48.7	18.4	30.3	7.22	118.8
1975	575,000	218,000	356,000	48.9	18.6	30.3	7.23	118.0
1976	590,000	228,000	362,000	48.9	18.9	30.0	7.23	120.2
1977	604,000	238,000	366,000	48.8	19.2	29.6	7.21	122.4
1978	620,000	248,000	372,000	48.7	19.5	29.2	7.18	126.3
1979	638,000	257,000	381,000	48.8	19.7	29.2	7.16	127.4
1980	651,000	282,000	369,000	48.8	21.1	27.7	7.13	133.9
1981	665,000	286,000	379,000	48.8	21.0	27.9	7.12	132.9
1982	678,000	287,000	390,000	48.7	20.6	28.1	7.09	125.8
1983	696,000	290,000	407,000	48.8	20.3	28.5	7.04	122.8
1984	720,000	294,000	426,000	49.2	20.1	29.1	7.00	120.0
1985	752,000	284,000	468,000	49.9	18.9	31.0	7.04	115.0
1986	784,000	293,000	490,000	50.6	18.9	31.6	7.08	113.5
1987	817,000	291,000	526,000	51.1	18.2	32.9	7.12	112.1
1988	845,000	299,000	546,000	51.2	18.1	33.1	7.11	111.0
1989	874,000	310,000	565,000	51.3	18.2	33.1	7.07	109.7
1990	904,000	319,000	586,000	51.4	18.1	33.3	7.04	108.0
1991	930,000	327,000	603,000	51.2	18.0	33.2	6.98	105.8
1992	964,000	335,000	629,000	51.3	17.8	33.5	6.96	103.7
1993	995,000	345,000	650,000	51.2	17.7	33.4	6.93	101.8
1994	1,025,000	353,000	672,000	50.9	17.5	33.4	6.93	100.3
1995	1,058,000	360,000	698,000	50.9	17.3	33.6	6.92	99.2
1996	1,068,000	363,000	704,000	50.2	17.1	33.1	6.89	98.3
1997	1,096,000	367,000	729,000	49.9	16.7	33.2	6.91	97.0
1998	1,112,000	370,000	742,000	49.3	16.4	32.9	6.89	95.2
1999	1,144,000	369,000	775,000	49.1	15.8	33.2	6.88	92.7
2000	1,169,000	368,000	801,000	48.6	15.3	33.3	6.83	89.6
2001	1,197,000	364,000	833,000	48.3	14.7	33.6	6.81	86.0
2002	1,221,000	360,000	861,000	47.8	14.1	33.7	6.78	82.2
2003	1,244,000	355,000	889,000	47.1	13.4	33.7	6.70	78.0
2004	1,271,000	342,000	928,000	46.7	12.6	34.1	6.65	73.4
2005	1,289,000	326,000	963,000	46.0	11.6	34.4	6.57	69.0
2006	1,309,000	311,000	998,000	45.4	10.8	34.6	6.48	64.9
2007	1,328,000	302,000	1,026,000	44.7	10.2	34.5	6.38	61.2
2008	1,344,000	296,000	1,048,000	43.9	9.7	34.2	6.25	57.8
2009	1,372,000	291,000	1,081,000	43.5	9.2	34.3	6.17	54.8
2010	1,397,000	286,000	1,110,000	43.1	8.8	34.2	6.07	51.8
2011	1,417,000	278,000	1,139,000	42.4	8.3	34.1	5.94	49.0
2012	1,435,000	270,000	1,165,000	41.7	7.8	33.9	5.78	46.1
2013	1,448,000	260,000	1,188,000	40.9	7.4	33.6	5.62	43.5
2014	1,461,000	254,000	1,207,000	40.2	7.0	33.2	5.46	41.3
2015	1,479,000	249,000	1,230,000	39.4	6.6	32.8	5.31	39.4
2016	1,498,000	246,000	1,251,000	38.7	6.4	32.3	5.17	37.4
2017	1,537,000	247,000	1,290,000	38.3	6.2	32.2	5.05	35.8
2018	1,580,000	246,000	1,333,000	38.1	5.9	32.1	4.93	34.3
2019	1,600,000	233,000	1,367,000	37.2	5.4	31.8	4.74	33.4
2020	1,636,000	239,000	1,397,000	36.8	5.5	31.4	4.62	32.1
2021	1,668,000	245,000	1,423,000	36.3	5.3	31.0	4.51	31.0
2022	1,694,000	238,000	1,456,000	35.8	5.0	30.8	4.39	30.3
2023	1,713,000	236,000	1,477,000	35.2	4.8	30.4	4.28	28.8
* CBR = crude birth rate (per 1000); CDR = crude death rate (per 1000); NC = natural change (per 1000); IMR = infant mortality rate per 1000 births; TFR = total fertility rate (number of children per woman)

=== Demographic and Health Surveys ===
Total Fertility Rate (TFR)(Wanted Fertility Rate) and Crude Birth Rate (CBR):

Year	Total		Urban		Rural	
Year	CBR	TFR	CBR	TFR	CBR	TFR
1982–1984		7.4		6.1		7.6
1985–1988		7.4		5.7		7.6
1995	47.8	6.86 (5.6)	47.7	4.97 (3.8)	47.8	7.17 (5.9)
2000–2001	47.3	6.9 (5.3)	41.3	4.0 (3.2)	48.0	7.4 (5.7)
2006	44.8	6.7	41.0	4.4	45.3	7.1
2011	42.1	6.2 (5.1)	40.3	3.8 (3.6)	42.4	6.8 (5.5)
2014 census		5.8				
2016	38.7	5.4 (4.3)	37.0	4.0 (3.4)	39.3	5.9 (4.6)
2018–19		5.0				
2024 census		4.5				

View source data.
View source data.
View source data.

Fertility data as of 2011 and 2016 (DHS Program):

Region	Total fertility rate (Wanted fertility rate) 2011	Percentage of women age 15-49 currently pregnant 2011	Mean number of children ever born to women age 40-49 2011
Kampala	3.3 (2.9)	8.3	5.0
Central 1	5.6 (4.2)	9.9	7.2
Central 2	6.3 (4.6)	9.6	7.1
East Central	6.9 (4.4)	13.7	7.9
Eastern	7.5 (5.3)	12.5	7.5
Karamoja	6.4 (5.8)	18.7	7.5
North	6.3 (4.3)	12.4	7.3
West Nile	6.8 (5.1)	10.4	7.4
Western	6.4 (4.7)	13.2	7.4
Southwest	6.2 (4.4)	11.3	7.2

Region	Total fertility rate (Wanted fertility rate) 2016	Percentage of women age 15-49 currently pregnant 2016	Mean number of children ever born to women age 40-49 2016
Kampala	3.5 (3.1)	6.6	4.7
Karamoja	7.9 (7.4)	15.1	7.8
West Nile	6.0 (5.0)	8.9	6.7
South Central	4.7 (3.9)	8.5	6.4
North Central	5.4 (4.3)	10.3	6.9
Busoga	6.1 (4.5)	12.4	7.5
Bukedi	6.1 (4.3)	13.7	7.4
Bugisu	5.6 (4.3)	9.3	6.8
Teso	6.0 (4.8)	10.4	7.8
Lango	5.1 (3.9)	10.4	7.1
Acholi	5.5 (3.8)	9.6	7.1
Bunyoro	6.0 (4.4)	8.5	6.8
Tooro	5.4 (4.4)	10.6	7.0
Kigezi	4.6 (3.8)	9.7	6.1
Ankole	4.9 (4.2)	8.8	6.4

=== Life expectancy at birth ===
Life expectancy at birth in Uganda

Period	Life expectancy in Years
1950–1955	40.00
1955–1960	▲42.60
1960–1965	▲45.39
1965–1970	▲48.12
1970–1975	▲49.14
1975–1980	▲49.33
1980–1985	▼49.05
1985–1990	▼46.86
1990–1995	▼44.57
1995–2000	▲44.98
2000–2005	▲49.92
2005–2010	▲55.15
2010–2015	▲58.61
2020	▲62.85
2021	▼62.71

== Ethnic groups ==
- Baganda 16.5%
- Banyankole 9.8%
- Basoga 8.8%
- Bakiga 7.1%
- Iteso 7%
- Langi 6.3%
- Bagisu 4.9%
- Acholi 4.4%
- Lugbara 3.3%
- Other 32.1%
- Multi-racial (unknown percentage)

=== South Asians and Arabs ===
During the Uganda Protectorate period, the British colonialists used South Asian immigrants as intermediaries. Following independence they constituted the largest non-indigenous ethnic group in Uganda, at around 80,000 people, and they dominated trade, industry, and the professions. This caused resentment among the native African majority, which was exploited by post-Independence leaders.

After Idi Amin came to power in 1971, he declared "economic war" on the Indians, culminating in the Expulsion of Asians in Uganda in 1972. Since Amin's overthrow in 1979 some Asians have returned. There are between 15,000 and 25,000 in Uganda today, nearly all in the capital Kampala.

== Languages ==
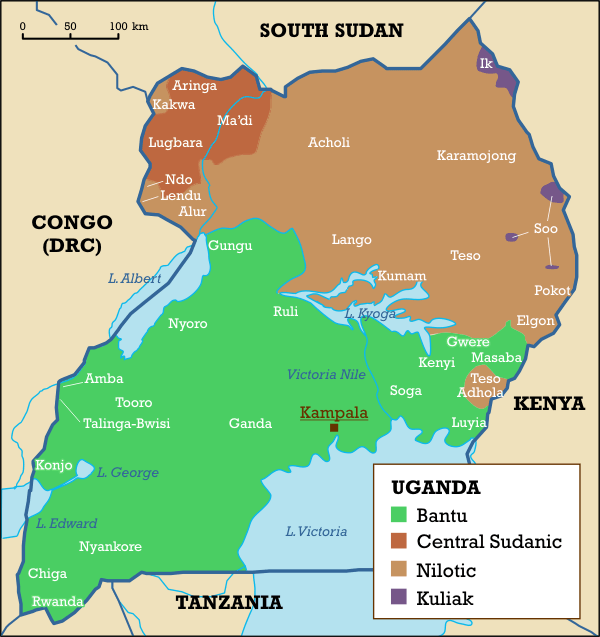
An ethnolinguistic map of Uganda

English (official national language, taught in grade schools, used in courts of law and by most newspapers and some radio broadcasts), Swahili (recently made second official language, important regionally but spoken by very few people in Uganda), Luganda (most widely used of the Niger–Congo languages, preferred for native language publications in the capital and may be taught in school), other Bantu languages, Nilo-Saharan languages and Arabic.

== Religion ==
Protestant 45.1%

Anglican 32.0%
Pentecostal/Born Again/Evangelical 11.1%
Seventh Day Adventist 1.7%
Baptist .3%

Roman Catholic 39.3%
Muslim 13.7%
other 1.6%
none 0.2% (2014 est.)

Uganda is a religiously diverse nation with Christianity being the most widely professed religion. According to the 2014 census, over 84 percent of the population was Christian while about 14 percent of the population adhered to Islam, making it the largest minority religion. In 2009, the northern and west Nile regions were dominated by Roman Catholics, and Iganga District in the east of Uganda had the highest percentage of Muslims, about 53% population.

== See also ==
- Youth in Uganda
