= Multiracial Ugandans in Uganda =

Multiracial Ugandans are Ugandans of mixed racial or ethnic ancestry.

== History ==
=== Colonial era ===
==== Ugandan-Europeans (Afro-Europeans) ====
Since colonialism, mixed-race people in Uganda have existed as a "product of Colonial history and are indeed considered as having a peculiar historical identity in terms of color and ethnic origin by other Ugandans" ( pg 8); indeed, the topic has lately become one that is openly discussed.

The product of colonial history saw the emergence of a new identity of Ugandans (in terms of color and multi-ethnic origin). Most interracial relationships occurred between male European explorers and local black African women. It was seen and known but not openly talked about or acknowledged.

Mixed-race relationships were excluded from open discourse during colonial times because they were considered by traditionalists, as a violation of societal boundaries. To some academicians, the multiracial people that emerged from that era symbolized two aspects: a liberation from the “authority of tradition” and a departure from a status quo depiction of culture

=== Ugandan-Arabs (Afro-Arabs) ===
Prior to and during colonialism, Arabs played a pivotal role in the East African slave trade. Numerous East Africans were sold as slaves to the regions of the Middle East and beyond via the Sahara desert and Indian Ocean. Many interracial relationships between (mostly) male Arab traders and black African women occurred. These unions gave rise to Ugandan-Arabs. Unlike the Trans-Atlantic slave trade, most of the slaves in the East African slave trade were women. Most of the women were sold as sex slaves, while some were taken as wives.

=== Ugandan-Indians (Afro-Indians) ===
During the construction of the East African/Uganda railway, the British Empire brought many Indian workers into East Africa for labor. The influx of Indians throughout Kenya, Uganda, Tanzania, and other neighboring countries contributed to numerous Ugandan-Indian unions in Uganda--especially in small towns located along the Railway. Traders--who were mostly Indian and male--married local Ugandan women, thus birthing a visible emergence of mixed Ugandan-Indian people.

== Demographics ==
The number of multiracial Ugandans in Uganda is not known or tracked.

The "one-drop rule," derived from the Southern United States slave culture, does not apply to multiracial Ugandans living in Uganda. Thus, mixed-race descendants of blacks and non-blacks in Uganda, like the mixed-race people of Brazil, Colombia, Panama, and other Latin American nations, are not considered black. They are described by their skin tone and nationality, and racially identified as belonging to another race other than black. Typically, people of brown and/or lighter skin tones would be called Mzungu by the local people.

== Social status ==
=== Discrimination ===
In the past and most recently, multiracial Ugandans in Uganda have expressed grievances about not being recognized as true Ugandan citizens and were denied or delayed in getting benefits (considered as basic rights), such as obtaining a National ID card or passport. This prompted President Yoweri Museveni, in 2016, following a meeting with a group of mixed-race Ugandans, to openly proclaim that mixed-racial people were to be treated as true Ugandans, per the established 1995 Constitution.

=== Citizenship defined ===
Of note, citizenship in Uganda is open to the following (per the mandates of the Directorate of Citizenship and Immigration):

(i) Every person born in Uganda, one of whose parents or grandparents is or was a member of any of the indigenous communities existing and residing within the borders of Uganda as at the first day of February, 1926 and set out in the third schedule of the constitution. (article10 a of the constitution) (ii) Every person born in or outside Uganda one of whose parents or grandparents was at the time of birth of that person, a citizen of Uganda by birth (iii) A child of not more than five years of age found in Uganda whose parents are not known is presumed to be Ugandan (iv) A child under the age of eighteen years neither of whose parents is a citizen of Uganda, who is adopted by a citizen of Uganda upon registration shall be a citizen of Uganda (v) A person who successfully applies for and is registered as a citizen of Uganda.

The government of Uganda has had to notify various institutions that multiracial Ugandans are citizens of Uganda--as the Omari case demonstrated.

== Media and Coverage ==
=== Politics ===
A landmark case, involving one Yasin Omari, of mixed Ugandan-Asian heritage, illustrated how, on various occasions, he and many people of mixed race were "subjected to discrimination by ministry officials during the process of registration, renewal of passports and National ID [cards], hence violating their rights to citizenship."

People of mixed race were also, reportedly, denied access to political appointments.

This case led to The Equal Opportunity Commission (EOC) tribunal in Uganda ordering the Ministry of Internal Affairs to give national ID cards and passports to multiracial persons—and directing all government components to treat all Ugandans equally without regard to color or racial heritage in the processing of citizenship benefits.

== Terminology ==
People of mixed or multiracial heritages in Uganda are commonly referred to as Half-castes (a term not regarded as derogatory or racist in nature) or chotara (singular in Swahili), wachotara (plural in Swahili).

== Trending ==
The topic of mixed-race Ugandans continues to resurface, in the public arena, with the growing number of Chinese men marrying Ugandan women, in some cases attributable to sham marriages with an opportunity to obtain immigration benefits.

One noted trend is the reported growing number of Ugandan women who were left behind with children fathered by Chinese men.
