= Vicente Guillén Izquierdo =

Spanish politician

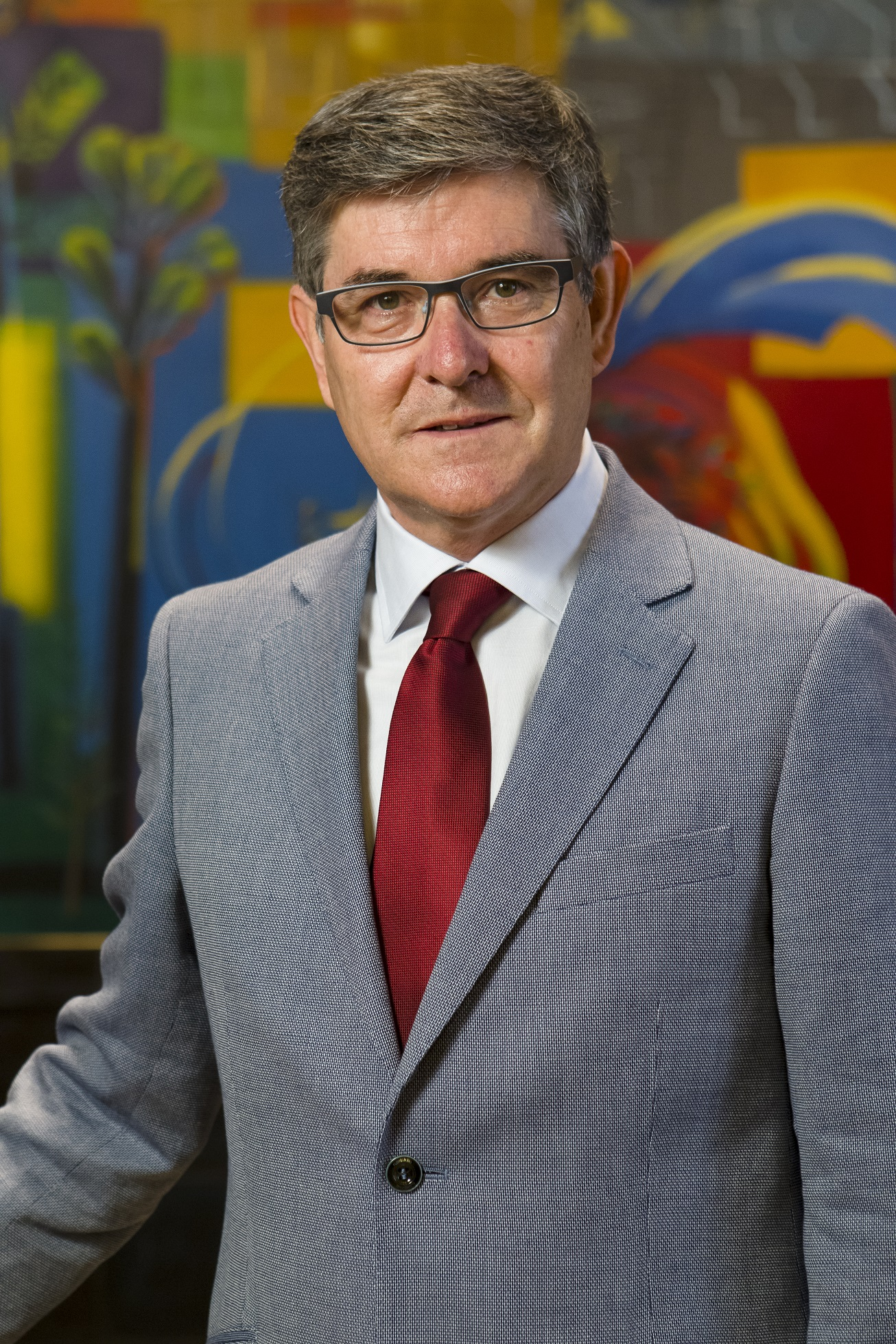
Vicente Guillén Izquierdo, Spanish politician

Vicente Guillén Izquierdo (born 24 September 1958 in Cedrillas, Spain) is a Spanish politician who belongs to the Spanish Socialist Workers' Party.

Married, Guillén qualified in law and philosophy. In 1989 he was elected to the Spanish Senate representing Teruel Province serving until 1993. He returned to the Senate at the 2004 election. He also served as Mayor of his hometown of Cedrillas from 1991 to 2001 and served as Secretary General of the PSOE in Teruel.

In 2008 he was elected to the Spanish Congress as a deputy for Teruel.
