= Julio Izquierdo Labrado =

Spanish writer

- Born: 1 November 1958 (age 67); San Juan de Aznalfarache, Spain
- Occupation: Writer

Julio Izquierdo Labrado (born 1 November 1958) is a Spanish writer and holds a doctoral degree. He received his Doctor of History, in collaboration with Lauro Anaya Pena at the I "Martín Alonso Pinzón" International Prize for Historical Research.

== Biography ==
Izquierdo Labrado was born on 1 November 1958 in San Juan de Aznalfarache, Province of Seville. He was director of the Casa Museo de los Hermanos Pinzón (Home Museum of the Pinzón Brothers), located in the city of Palos de la Frontera. As of 2010, he works in the House of Culture Vicente Aleixandre of Palos de la Frontera, and he is a member of the investigation group "Mentality, Society, and Environment in the Modern Era" in Andalucía and Latin America. He is based at the University of Huelva where he was a professor of Modern Political History. Labrado was also president of the Real Sociedad Palósfila Pinzoniana between 1987 and 1995.

== Works ==
Aside from numerous articles in special interest periodicals and scripts of historical documentaries for diverse national, European, American, and Japanese radio and television broadcasts, he has published, among other works.

- Palos de la Frontera en el Antiguo Régimen.(1380-1830), Latin American Institute for Cooperation and Ayuntamiento de Palos de la Frontera, Huelva, 1987. Depósito Legal: H-110/87.
- "Palermos en Indias", in Huelva en su Historia I, University School of La Rábida, Caja Provincial de Ahorros de Huelva; Latin-American University of Santa María de La Rábida, Junta de Andalucía Ministry of Culture, Seville, 1986. ISBN 84-600-4579-X.
- "Análisis demoeconómico de la costa de Huelva, (1510-1530)", in Huelva en su Historia II, University School of La Rábida, Caja Provincial de Ahorros de Huelva; Latin-American University of Santa María de La Rábida, Junta de Andalucía Ministry of Culture, Association of Chemical and Energy Industries, Río Tinto Minera S.A., Ayuntamientos de Palos de la Frontera, Huelva, Moguer and Lepe, Huelva,1988. ISBN 84-600-5415-2.
- Itinerario Colombino, Workbooks from the Ministry of Education and Science and the Ministry of Culture and Environment of the Junta de Andalucía, Gabinete Pedagógico de Bellas Artes de Huelva, Artes Gráficas Andaluzas S.L. Huelva, 1992.
- "Relaciones de los vecinos de Palos con sus parientes emigrados a Indias", in Nueva Hespérides, "Hespérides" Association of Teachers of Geography and History in Andalucia, Córdoba, 1992.
- "La esclavitud en Huelva y Palos a fines del siglo XVI", in Huelva en su Historia VI, Universidad de Huelva, 1997. ISSN 1136-6877.
- "El comercio de esclavos. Gibraleón", in Historia de la provincia de Huelva, Agedime S.L. - Editorial Mediterráneo, Madrid, 1999. ISBN 84-7156-345-2.
- "Religiosidad popular en los Lugares Colombinos: su proyección evangelizadora hacia América", in Religiosidad y costumbres populares en Iberoamérica, International Conference on Religion and folk customs in Latin America. Num. 1. Almonte. Universidad de Huelva. 2000. pp. 185–196. ISBN 84-95089-49-1.
- Breve Historia de Palos de la Frontera, Ayuntamiento de Palos de la Frontera, Huelva, 2002.
- Prólogo a La población de El Salvador, by Rodolfo Barón Castro. 3a ed. Publications and Forms Directorate, National Council for Culture and the Arts, El Salvador, Central America, 2002. ISBN 99923-0-055-8.
- Palermos ilustres, Ayuntamiento de Palos de la Frontera, Huelva, 2003. ISBN 84-606-3612-7.
- La esclavitud en la Baja Andalucía y su proyección atlántico - africana. Huelva, Palos y Moguer (Siglos XV - XVIII), Diputación Provincial de Huelva, 2004. ISBN 84-8163-361-5.
- La esclavitud en la Baja Andalucía: el difícil camino hacia la libertad, Preface by Bartolomé Bennassar, Diputación Provincial de Huelva, 2004. ISBN 84-8163-366-6.
- "El descubrimiento del Brasil por Vicente Yáñez Pinzón: el Cabo de Santo Agostinho", in Huelva en su Historia X, Universidad de Huelva, 2005. I.S.S.N.: 1136-6877.
- "La pesca en la costa occidental del Golfo de Cádiz y su proyección atlántico-africana durante la Edad Moderna", with David González Cruz and Antonio Manuel González Díaz, in Actas de la I Conferencia Internacional sobre Historia de la Pesca en el ámbito del Estrecho, El Puerto de Santa María (Cádiz), 2006. ISBN 84-8474-186-9.
- "Orígenes de la esclavitud moderna en Europa", in Actas del Congreso Les Africains et leurs descendants en Europe avant le XXe siècle, Université de Toulouse Le Mirail, 2007.
- "El discurso eclesiástico en Andalucía Occidental: los Lugares Colombinos durante la Guerra de Sucesión", in Propaganda y mentalidad bélica en España y América durante el siglo XVIII. Madrid, Spain. Ministry of Defense. Vol. 1. 2007. ISBN 978-8497-813-495.
- Mallonga historio de Palos de la Frontera, Congreso Internacional de Esperanto, Excmo. Ayuntamiento de Palos de la Frontera, Huelva, 2007. Depósito Legal: H-229-2007.
- "Los clérigos de los Lugares Colombinos en los periodos de guerra y en la evangelización y conquista de América", in Religión y conflictos bélicos en Iberoamérica, International University of Andalucia, Seville, 2008. ISBN 978-84-7993-068-4.
