= Pre–World War II career of Erich Raeder =

Erich Johann Albert Raeder (24 April 1876 – 6 November 1960) was a naval leader in Germany before and during World War II. Raeder attained the highest possible naval rank – that of Großadmiral (grand admiral) – in 1939, becoming the first person to hold that rank since Alfred von Tirpitz. Raeder led the Kriegsmarine (German War Navy) for the first half of the war; he resigned in 1943 and was replaced by Karl Dönitz. He was sentenced to life in prison at the Nuremberg Trials, but was released early due to failing health. Raeder is also well known for dismissing Reinhard Heydrich from the Reichsmarine in April 1931 for "conduct unbecoming to an officer and a gentleman".

This article covers Raeder's naval career before he became a grand admiral in 1939.

== Building the Weltmachtflotte ==
=== Tirpitz's Navy ===
He joined the Kaiserliche Marine (Imperial Navy) in 1894 and rapidly rose in rank, becoming chief of staff for Franz von Hipper in 1912. In 1901 to 1903 Raeder served on the staff of Prince Heinrich of Prussia, and gained a powerful patron in the process. Raeder's rise up the ranks was due mostly to his intelligence and hard work. Raeder often impressed people who knew him as "aloof, uncomfortable in professional relationships, religious, authoritarian, puritanical, intolerant of individual initiative ... and extremely sensitive to criticism". Owing to his cold and distant personality, Raeder was a man whom even his friends often admitted to knowing very little about. The Navy that Raeder joined was dominated by ideology of Seemachtideologie (Sea power ideology) which through concepts defined in Social Darwinist terms such as Seemacht (sea power), Seeherrschaft (sea prestige) and Seeletung (sea control) were closely related to the concept of Weltmachthorizonte (World Power Horizon), namely that whatever power controlled the sea was always the world's greatest power. The dominating figure of the Navy was Admiral Alfred von Tirpitz, the autocratic State Secretary of the Navy who using the theories of the American naval historian Alfred Thayer Mahan had devised a distinctive Seemachtideologie, a Social Darwinist view of international relations where only the strongest states survived, and which in turn required a policy of imperialism to ensure that the German state was the strongest. Using Mahan's seminal 1890 book The Influence of Sea Power Upon History and its sequels as his guide, Tirpitz argued that whatever state ruled the sea also ruled the globe, and that if Germany were to become the world's leading power, then by necessity the Reich needed first to become the world's leading sea power. Besides Mahan, Tirptiz borrowed heavily from the geopolitik theories of Friedrich Ratzel and Curt von Maltzahn to construct the Seemachtideologie. Through Tirpitz's preferred means of obtaining "world power status" was through his Risikotheorie (Risk theory) where Germany would build a Riskflotte (Risk Fleet) that would make it too dangerous for Britain to risk a war with Germany, and thereby alter the international balance of power decisively in the Reich's favor, war was never excluded as an option. In order to achieve this, Tirpitz transformed the Navy from the small coastal defense force of 1897 that existed in the shadow of the Army into the mighty High Seas Fleet of 1914 that was almost the equal of the Army. The Tirpitz Plan was a key part of the policy of Weltpolitik ("World Politics") announced in 1897 whereas the German government stated it was not longer content with being a European power, but instead announced its claim to be a world power. Raeder was to be a faithful follower of the Seemachtideologie for his entire life.

Raeder was married in 1903 and had three children by his first wife. In 1904, Raeder who spoke fluent Russian was sent to the Far East as an observer of the Russo-Japanese War. Starting in 1905 Raeder worked in the public relations section of the Navy, where he first met Tirpitz and began his introduction to politics by briefing journalists to run articles promoting the Seemachtideologie and meeting politicians who held seats in the Reichstag in order to convert them to the Seemachtideologie. Working closely with Tirptiz, Raeder was heavily involved in the lobbying the Reichstag to pass the Third Navy Law of 1906 which committed Germany to building "all big gun battleships" to compete with the new British Dreadnought class in the Anglo-German naval race that had begun early in the 20th century. Because warships were very expensive to build and took several years to complete, Tirpitz impressed upon Raeder that the first prerequisite of sea power was the need to have the leaders of the state totally committed to navalism in order to have necessary expenditure to sustain a navy, a view that Raeder was to fully embrace as his own.

Raeder was the captain of Kaiser Wilhelm II's private yacht in the years leading up to World War I. As captain of the yacht SMY Hohenzollern, Raeder earned commendations from the Kaiser and formed a friendship with Franz von Hipper, both of which were to greatly help his career in the Imperial Navy. Raeder was later to claim he did not want "court duty", but he was aware that officers who served as captain of the Hohenzollern were known to enjoy imperial favor, and that captains of the imperial yacht were always promoted to high duties afterwards. Raeder was always very close to Wilhelm II, whose views on sea power Raeder called "soundly reasoned", and maintained a correspondence with Wilhelm right up to his death in 1941. Raeder was later to argue that Wilhelm had made many mistakes during his reign, but stated that Wilhelm's navalism and his commitment to making Germany a global power were not one of them.

=== World War I: The Navy under fire ===
Raeder served as Hipper's chief of staff during World War I as well as in combat posts, taking part in the Battle of Dogger Bank in 1915 and the Battle of Jutland in 1916. Raeder was later to describe Hipper as an admiral who "hated paperwork", and as such, Hipper delegated considerable power to Raeder, who thus enjoyed more power than what his position as chief of staff would suggest. As the Anglo-German naval race escalated in the year prior to 1914, Raeder and other naval officers looked forward to Der Tag (The Day) when the High Seas Fleet would meet the British Grand Fleet in battle. When the First World War began in 1914, much to the intense mortification of the Navy's leaders, Wilhelm II ordered that the High Seas Fleet was to stay in port and not risk combat ostensibly under the grounds that the war would be over soon, and he wanted to keep the fleet intact as a bargaining chip for the peace talks. In reality, the greater size of the Grand Fleet made it likely that the British fleet would annihilate the High Seas Fleet in a sustained engagement, and Wilhelm could not bear the thought of seeing his beloved High Seas Fleet being destroyed. As the High Seas Fleet stayed in port while the Army continued to do most of the fighting, many in Germany came to see the High Seas Fleet as a white elephant. Moreover, Army leaders who long before 1914 had deeply resented Tirpitz for the way he had grabbed increasing larger and larger shares of the defense budget, had after the failure of the Schlieffen Plan made the Navy the scapegoat, arguing that if only the millions of marks spent on the Navy had instead being spent on the Army, Germany would have won the war in 1914. As such, many naval leaders feeling the Navy was under fire were very anxious for the High Seas Fleet to do something to justify the huge sums of money that had been spent building it. In order to have the High Seas Fleet being seen to do something, Hipper and Raeder planned and executed the Yarmouth raid in the fall of 1914, an operation that Raeder considered only a marginal success as Hipper's battlecruisers of the I Scouting Group missed a smaller British battlecruiser force that had been sent out to intercept them, and which Raeder believed the Germans could have destroyed. Another raid by the Scouting Group planned by Raeder led to the Battle of Dogger Bank, which marked the first time Raeder saw combat. Raeder expressed much "amazement" that the 1st Battlecruiser Squadron had been able to intercept the Scouting Group on the open sea at Dogger Bank, but did not suspect that the British were reading the German codes.

During and after World War I, the Imperial German Navy had been divided into two factions. One faction led by Admiral Alfred von Tirpitz were avid followers of the teachings of the American historian Alfred Thayer Mahan and believed in building a "balanced fleet" centred around the battleship that would, if war came, seek out and win a decisive battle of annihilation (Entscheidungsschlacht) against the Royal Navy. Another faction led by Commander Wolfgang Wegener argued that because of superior British shipbuilding capacity that Germany could never hope to build a "balanced fleet" capable of winning the Entscheidungsschlacht, and that as such, the best use of German naval strength was to build a fleet of cruisers and submarines that would wage a guerre de course ("war of the chase", a strategy of seeking to destroy the British Merchant Marine instead of the Navy). The debate had started in February 1915 when Commander Wegener started to circulate staff papers attacking Tirpitz's leadership as having trapped the High Seas Fleet in a "dead angle in a dead sea", and suggested an alternative strategy for victory. After reading all three of Wegener's papers setting out his ideas, Admiral Hipper decided to submit them to the Admiralty in Berlin, but changed his mind after reading a paper by Raeder attacking the "Wegener thesis" as flawed. This marked the beginning of a long feud between Raeder and Wegener with Wegener claiming that his former friend Raeder was jealous of what Wegener insisted were his superior ideas. The dispute between the advocates of Kreuzerkrieg (cruiser war) who favored using U-boats in a guerre-de course vs those like Raeder who believed in having battleships win a battle of annihilation grew quite heated during the war.

In May 1916, Raeder played a major role planning a raid by Hipper's battlecruisers that was intended to lure out the British battlecruiser force which would then being destroyed by the main High Seas Fleet. This raid became the Battle of Jutland. As chief of staff to Hipper, Raeder played a prominent role at Jutland, and was forced mid-way in the battle to transfer from SMS Lützow to the SMS Moltke as a result of damage to Hipper's flagship, which led Hipper to praise his chief of staff for the way he kept his cool and went back to work despite all of the stresses of combat and the transfer. Other officers were more critical of Raeder at Jutland, arguing that his repeated advice to Hipper that the battlecruisers should keep "charging" the Grand Fleet and that the battle should not be broken off was not rational as to continue the battle against the numerically superior Grand Fleet would result in the destruction of the High Seas Fleet. The Skagerrakschlacht as Jutland is known in the German-speaking world was considered a victory in Germany, and Hipper praised Raeder in his report after the battle for "un-resting activity and clear sightedness" at Jutland.

As chief of staff to Admiral Hipper, he was closely involved in Hipper's plans for a German battlecruiser squadron to sail across the Atlantic and sweep through the waters off Canada down to the West Indies and on to South America to sink the British cruisers operating in those waters, and thereby force the British to redeploy a substantial part of the Home Fleet to the New World. In turn, such a redeployment would weaken the numerical superiority of the British Home Fleet over the German High Seas Fleet in the North Sea. To get around the problems posed by the limited range of German warships, Hipper and Raeder suggested establishing a line of German colliers across the North Atlantic from Norway to Canada that the battlecruisers would meet at predetermined points to refuel. Through Hipper's plans were rejected as far too risky, not least because of the problems posed by transferring coal from ship to ship on the open sea, it was a major influence on Raeder's later thinking. Another major influence on Raeder was his close friend Admiral Adolf von Trotha who had commanded the "Detached Division" of the Navy before 1914 and often taken the "Detached Division" on long voyages into the Atlantic. Together with the war-time plans of Admiral Alfred von Tirpitz to start building capital ships with diesel engines in order to expand the range of German warships, Trotha influenced Raeder into thinking about deep operations into the Atlantic as a way of forcing the British to break up their fleet. Trotha told Raeder that one German raider on the open seas would force the British to deploy 10-15 warships to hunt it down. Like Hipper, Raeder was critical of those officers who believed that submarines could win the war at sea, arguing in several staff papers that at best submarines were an adjunct to the battle fleet, and that the capital ship remained the key weapon.

Despite his lifelong claims to be "above politics", Raeder approved of Tirpitz's ultra-nationalist, extreme right-wing Fatherland Party, which was founded in September 1917 to advance his "total war" ideas in politics. Tirpitz argued in favor of frankly imperialist war aims to make Germany's the world's greatest power. Tirpitz maintained that since the British, French, Russian and American governments could scarcely be expected to willingly agree to a peace that would reduce them to second-rate powers existing in the shadow of a greater Germany, a negotiated peace was impossible, and Germany could only achieve its war aims by winning a total victory. To achieve the total victory required a policy of total war, which in turn required a new totalitarian regime in Germany preferably led by himself that would mobilise the entire society while ruthlessly crushing all dissent. As part of his harsh critique of Wilhelm II as a war leader, Tirpitz claimed that the High Seas Fleet had been "held back" in 1914, a claim that serve to disguise the "unavowed sense of failure" held by the naval officer corps as the High Seas Fleet sat in port while the Army was engaged on two fronts. The British historian Richard J. Evans wrote that in many ways the Fatherland Party was the prototype of the Nazi Party, and indeed the Nazi Party was founded in January 1919 in Munich by men who had previously been active in the Fatherland Party. After the war, Raeder together with most other officers came to believe that if only Tirpitz had been able to practice his "total war" policies of 1917-18 before 1914 then Germany would have won the war. Reflecting his authoritarian tendencies, after the High Seas Fleet mutiny of August 1917, Raeder called for harsher discipline in the Navy to prevent another mutiny.

On 14 October 1918, Raeder received a major promotion when he was appointed deputy to Admiral Paul Behncke, the Naval State Secretary. Despite his doubts about submarines, Raeder spent the last weeks of the war working to achieve the Scheer Programme of building 450 U-boats that Admiral Reinhard Scheer claimed would allow Germany to win the war at sea. In the last week of October 1918, Raeder was deeply involved in Hipper's plans for a "death cruise" that see the High Seas Fleet engage in a battle of annihilation against the Anglo-American Grand Fleet, a battle which given the disparity of numbers between the two sides was most likely to result in the High Seas Fleet being annihilated. Critics of the plan called the planned action a "death ride" for the High Seas Fleet and the "Admirals' Rebellion" that was designed to sabotage the talks for an armistice that started earlier in October 1918. Hipper himself admitted that planned battle in the North Sea would almost certainly result in the destruction of the German fleet, but argued that "an honorable fleet engagement, even if should become a death battle, would be the foundation for a new German fleet, a fleet that would be out of the question in the event of a dishonorable peace". Raeder also agreed that the plan would probably result in the destruction of the High Seas Fleet, but argued that the Navy's "honor and existence" were at stake, and the Navy would die of "shock of shame" if the battle was not fought. Raeder further claimed that any surviving German ships would be the Kernflotte (core fleet) of a new Weltmachtflotte (World Power Fleet) that would not exist if the war ended with the High Seas Fleet still sitting in port. The purpose of the planned "death ride" was to win the Navy enough glory in the war to ensure that the Army did not take the lion's share of defense budget after the war.

The sailors of the High Seas Fleet, who had been mistreated by their officers for the duration of the war saw no reason why they should be expected to die in a battle of no military value and when the government had already admitted that the war was lost, and on 28 October 1918 the fleet mutinied. Raeder played a major role in attempting to crush the mutiny. Fearing that the phone lines had been tapped, Scheer sent Raeder to Wilhelmshaven to inform Hipper that "dependable" Army units were being rounded up that would crush the mutiny. Upon arriving in Wilhelmshaven, a deeply shocked Raeder was forced to inform Berlin that the situation was far worse than feared, and that even sending in the Army might not be enough. Only with the greatest difficulty did Raeder make his way back to Berlin, only to find that the revolution had spread there. For Raeder, the High Seas Mutiny came as a tremendous shock and was described as being a "deep trauma" for him. Raeder felt so deeply humiliated by the mutiny that he was later to claim that there had been no mutiny, but rather "criminal elements" had disguised themselves in sailors' uniforms as part of a devious Socialist/Communist plot to discredit the Navy. Raeder could not accept that German sailors would willingly mutiny against their officers, a conclusion which led him to claim that the mutiny had been the result of a huge conspiracy involving the Independent Social Democrats and the Communists who had undermined morale to stab the Fatherland in the back.

== Under the Weimar Republic ==
=== High Seas Fleet Mutiny to Kapp putsch ===
In the First World War, Raeder's two younger brothers were both killed in action, and in 1919 his first marriage, which had been under heavy strain due to war-related stresses ended in divorce. For the puritanical Raeder, the divorce was a huge personal disgrace, and as a result for the rest of his life, he always denied his first marriage. Coming at the same time as the defeat in the First World War, and the High Seas Fleet mutiny of 1918 which toppled the German monarchy, both of which were very traumatic events for Raeder, the years 1918-1919 were some of the most troubled in his life. For Raeder, the idea that all of the suffering and sacrifice of the Great War, which had affected him personally was all in vain was unthinkable, and he became obsessed with making certain that Germany would one day obtain the "world power status" that the Reich's leaders had sought, but failed to achieve in the Great War. For Raeder as for other naval officers, the defeat of 1918 was especially humiliating because under the charismatic leadership of Admiral Alfred von Tirpitz, the Naval State Secretary from 1897 to 1917, the Navy had been promoted as the service which would give Germany the "world power status" that her leaders craved, and to that end, vast sums of money had been spent in the Anglo-German naval race before 1914. Because the Navy had failed to achieve what Tirpitz had promised, there was a very strong anti-navalist mood in Germany after 1918.

In the winter of 1918–19, Raeder was closely involved in the efforts of the naval officer corps, strongly backed by the Defense Minister Gustav Noske-a Majority Social Democrat with firm law and order views-to disband the sailors' councils established after the mutiny. During this period, Raeder served as the liaison between the naval officer corps and Noske, and it was Raeder who suggested to Noske on 11 January 1919 that Adolf von Trotha be appointed commander-in-chief of the Navy. Tirpitz's attacks on the Emperor's leadership during the war had caused a split in the officer corps between the followers of "the Master" and the Kaiser, and Raeder wanted Trotha as the only officer acceptable to both fractions. Noske in turn asked the Navy for volunteers for the Freikorps to crush uprisings from the Communists. The Navy contributed two bridges to the Freikorps. The price of the Navy supporting the Freikorps was the continuation of the Navy's "state-within-the state" status and the end of attempts to democratise the military. Under the Weimar republic, the military considered itself überparteiliche (above party), which did not mean political neutrality as implied. The military argued that there were two types of "politics", parteipolitisch (party politics) which was the responsibility of the politicians and staatspolitisch (state politics) which was the responsibility of the military. Staatspolitisch concerned Germany "eternal" interests and the "historic mission" of winning world-power, which was to be pursued regardless of what the politicians or the people wanted.

Raeder saw the Weimar republic as a mere transition, and argued that naval officers like himself were the "trustees of Germany", being the only ones who truly understood the "national interest", and it was the duty of officers to keep alive the concept of a Weltmachtflotte until Germany was cured of the "sickness" as Raeder labeled democracy. After the war, in 1920, Raeder was involved in the failed Kapp Putsch where together with almost the entire naval officer corps he declared himself openly for the "government" of Wolfgang Kapp against the leaders of the Weimar Republic, which Raeder loathed. As the chief of staff to Admiral Adolf von Trotha, the Navy's commander, Raeder played a prominent role in rallying support for the putsch. Raeder claimed to be ignorant of the plans for a putsch, but in the days preceding the putsch, Trotha and Raeder had been in close contact with General Walther von Lüttwitz (the real leader of the Kapp putsch) and the Freikorps leader Captain Hermann Ehrhardt. As soon as they learned that Berlin had been occupied by Marinebrigade Ehrhardt on the morning of 13 March 1920, Trotha and Raeder issued a proclamation declaring that the Weimar Republic had ended, declared their loyalty to Kapp "government", and ordered the Navy to seize Wilhelmshaven and Kiel for the putsch. On 18 March 1920 when Raeder's close friend, Admiral Magnus von Levetzow who had seized Kiel proposed a march on Berlin with the aim of deposing the government after the failure of the putsch in Berlin, Raeder declared his intention of joining Levetzow, only to change his mind a few hours later, and hastily called the Defence Minister Gustav Noske to tell him he had been "misunderstood" about joining Levetzow on his proposed march. Had it not been for a general amnesty for those involved in the Kapp putsch passed by the Reichstag on 8 August 1920, it is quite likely that Raeder's career would have ended in 1920 with a dishonourable discharge for high treason. Raeder's friends Trotha and Levetzow were not so lucky, both resigning rather than suffering the humiliation of a dishonourable discharge. In participating in the Kapp putsch, Raeder had violated the Reichswehreid, the oath of allegiance that committed officers to upholding and defending the Republic, though he was later to claim that oaths were sacred to him and the Hitler oath made it impossible for him to rebel against Hitler. Finally, in the summer of 1920 Raeder married his second wife, by who he was to have one son.

=== Inspector of Training ===
After the failure of the Kapp putsch he was marginalized in the Navy, being transferred to the Naval Archives, where for two years he played a leading role in the writing of the Official History of the Navy in World War I. Raeder also was the author of a number of studies about naval warfare, something that resulted in his being awarded a Doctor of Philosophy degree honoris causa by Kiel University. After this, Raeder continued to rise steadily in the navy hierarchy, becoming a Konteradmiral (rear admiral) in 1922 and a Vizeadmiral (vice admiral) in 1925. During his time as Inspector of Training, Raeder who was obsessed with avoiding a repeat of the High Seas Mutiny of 1918-the greatest humiliation in German naval history in his view-put a great deal of emphasis on discipline, especially on training officers to maintain firm control of their ships. During Raeder's tenure as Inspector of Training, technical training of officers was sidelined in favor of promoting the "moral character" amongst the officer candidates that would prevent another mutiny. Raeder saw the culture of modern Germany as manifested in various phenomena such as the popularity of jazz music, modern dance, sexual permissiveness, democracy and pacifism as deeply depraved, and sought as much as possible to isolate officer candidates from Weimar culture, instead preaching the virtues of the 19th century in which he had grown up.

=== Debates and recriminations ===
In the 1920s, a major debate occurred within the Reichsmarine as to what were the correct lessons of World War I for the future, which tended to pit followers of Tirpitz against the followers of the "Wegener thesis". As a close protégé of Tirpitz, Raeder followed his lead in arguing for a battleship-centric "balanced fleet" meant to win the Entscheidungsschlacht in the North Sea. In the 1920s, Raeder as one of the authors of the official history of the Imperial German Navy in World War I; he sided with Tirpitz against the Jeune École-inspired theories of Wegener, arguing that everything done by "the Master", as his mentor Tirpitz was known, was correct, and dismissed the strategy of guerre de course as a "dangerous delusion". When writing the official history, Raeder was in close contact with Tirpitz, always mailing his work to Tirpitz for him to review before submitting it to publication. Raeder also declared his loyalty in the official history to Tirptiz while trying to stay loyal to the Kaiser by excoriating the Chancellor Theobald von Bethmann-Hollweg for "holding back" the High Seas Fleet in 1914, instead of "unleashing" it as Tirpitz had wanted. Raeder maintained that the Kaiser would have followed Tirpitz's advice to "unleash" the High Seas Fleet in 1914, but was forced by Bethmann-Hollweg, who had conveniently died in 1921 and thus could not contradict Raeder's account to "hold back" the fleet. Tirpitz was greatly pleased by Raeder's defence of his leadership and theories. And Tirpitz, who was still very influential in the Navy despite having retired in 1916, started to speak of Raeder as an ideal man to head the Navy. Raeder and Wegener were once friends, having begun their careers as ensigns in 1894 abroad the cruiser Deutschland, but their differing concepts of future strategy turned them into the most bitter of enemies, and the two officers were to spend much of the 1920s waging a war in print over what the Navy should or should not had done in the First World War and what were the correct lessons of the recent conflict for the future. After Raeder become Navy commander in 1928, officers were ordered to write journal articles attacking the "Wegener thesis". A notable exception to the flood of attacks on the "Wegener thesis" was Raeder's silence about Wegener's claim that Germany should have occupied Norway in 1914. When Wegener died in 1956, Raeder refused to deliver the eulogy as his position as the senior most surviving member of the "enlistment crew" of 1894 would normally have obliged him to do.

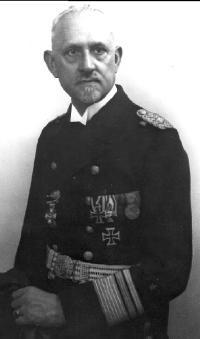
Wolfgang Wegener around 1925. Wegener had once been Raeder's friend, but their friendship ended as the two became involved in a debate in the 1920s about why Germany lost in 1918.

These debates were not purely academic. Because of the extravagant promises made by Tirpitz before 1914 that sea power equalled world power, and because of the equally extravagant sums that were spent on the Navy during the Anglo-German naval race (by 1913–14, the Anglo-German naval race was costing so much money as the Reich government continued to pour vast sums of money into the Navy that concerns started to be expressed about Germany's creditworthiness.), many Germans wanted to know what had gone wrong with the Navy in the war. Tirpitz had sought to provide the answer in 1919 when he published his memoirs, where he blamed everybody but himself for the defeat. Tirpitz lashed out in venomous, vituperative prose against the former Kaiser and most of the other senior admirals, whom Tirpitz accused of being incompetent and/or cowardly. Tirpitz's memoirs were seen as a literary declaration of war by other admirals, and what followed were a series of duelling memoirs in the 1920s where various admirals attacked each other in a no-holds-barred style that damaged the image of the Navy. The result of admirals' calling each other stupid and incompetent in books and newspaper articles was to make everybody look stupid and incompetent. Many Germans reached the conclusion that the navalist policies of the German Empire had been a blunder, given the people running the Navy at the time all appeared to be fools. In 1927, Prince Heinrich of Prussia complained that because the Navy was "washing its dirty linen" in public that Navy's image was becoming damaged beyond repair, and publicly appealed to officers both active-duty and retired, especially Tirpitz, to stop attacking each other in public. Raeder came to fear that this debate was starting to sully the image of the Navy to such an extent that he would never convince anyone in power to fund the Navy again, and so took extraordinary steps in the late 1920s to end the debate by trying to silence all critics of Tirpitz. For Raeder, the first step towards persuading decision-makers to adopt navalist policies again was to end the damaging debates about what went wrong in the First World War, and instead project a positive image of the Navy's history that was meant to sway decision-makers into navalism. An important sign of the anti-navalist mood of the country was the Reichstag elections of 1928, when one of the main issues was the "pocket battleship" programme, and the Social Democrats won the largest number of votes on a platform of killing the plan to build "pocket battleships", and using the money on social programs instead. In private, Raeder often fumed against the Social Democrats for playing "party politics" with the naval budget, as he deemed their opposition to navalism, and which was incensed that the S.P.D were against even building up the Navy to the levels allowed by the Treaty of Versailles. Besides the Social Democrats, Raeder also charged that the other parties of the Weimar Coalition, the DDP and the Catholic Zentrum, had "pacifistic tendencies" that had blinded them to the importance of sea power. This in turn further increased Raeder's opposition to democracy because in a dictatorship the state could pursue navalist policies regardless of what the voters wanted. Raeder's repeated insistence that he was "above politics" meant in practice that he was loyal to the Reich, not the republic.

Military offices
Preceded by Admiral Hans Zenker	Commander in Chief of the Reichsmarine; 1928-1935	Succeeded by himself as Commander in Chief of the Kriegsmarine
Preceded by himself as Commander in Chief of the Reichsmarine	Commander in Chief of the Kriegsmarine; 1935-1943	Succeeded by Karl Dönitz
Awards and achievements
Preceded by Sir Stafford Cripps	Cover of Time magazine 20 April 1942	Succeeded by Pierre Laval
