= Werner von Fichte =

German Nazi SA general (1896–1955)

Police President, Erfurt
- In office March 1933 – 2 July 1934
- Succeeded by: Albert Stange

Führer, SA-Gruppe Westfalen
- In office 1 July 1932 – 31 October 1932
- Succeeded by: Wilhelm Schepmann

Führer, SA-Gruppe Nordwest
- In office 2 April 1931 – 13 April 1932

Additional positions
- 1932–1933: Inspector, SA-OSAF

Personal details
- Born: 4 May 1896 Kassel, Province of Hesse-Nassau, Kingdom of Prussia, German Empire
- Died: 20 June 1955 (aged 59) Munich, Bavaria, West Germany
- Party: Nazi Party
- Profession: Military officer
- Civilian awards: Golden Party Badge

Military service
- Allegiance: German Empire; Weimar Republic; Nazi Germany
- Branch/service: Prussian Army; Luftstreitkräfte; Freikorps; Reichswehr; German Army
- Years of service: 1914–1923; 1939–1945
- Rank: Oberleutnant; Major
- Unit: 18th (Thuringian) Foot Artillery Regiment; Marinebrigade Ehrhardt
- Battles/wars: World War I World War II
- Military awards: Iron Cross, 1st and 2nd class

Werner von Fichte (4 May 1896 – 20 June 1955) was a German professional military officer who became an SA-Obergruppenführer in the Sturmabteilung, the Nazi Party paramilitary organization. He held several high-level commands and served as the police president in Erfurt until he was removed during Adolf Hitler's purge of the SA leadership known as the Night of the Long Knives. He then worked as a writer, served in the military during the Second World War and underwent post-war denazification.

== Early life and war service ==
Fichte was born in Kassel, the son of a Prussian military officer, Generalmajor Georg von Fichte, and he was a great-great-grandson of the philosopher Johann Gottlieb Fichte. Entering on a career in the military, he was educated in military academies in Karlsruhe, Bensberg (today, a district of Bergisch Gladbach) and the Preußische Hauptkadettenanstalt (Prussian Main Cadet Institute) at Groß-Lichterfelde. He was commissioned as a Leutnant in the Prussian Army in 1913 and was assigned to the 18th (Thuringian) Foot Artillery Regiment.

From 1914 to 1918, Fichte participated in the First World War on both the eastern and western fronts, and also in Romania and the Ottoman Empire. He transferred to the Luftstreitkräfte, sustained minor injuries in an airplane crash and was awarded the Iron Cross, 1st and 2nd class. After the end of the war, he joined the Freikorps Marinebrigade Ehrhardt. He remained in the Reichswehr, the army of the Weimar Republic, until 1923 when he was discharged with the rank of Oberleutnant. Fichte joined the Viking League, an anti-republican paramilitary group founded by the former Marinebrigade commander, Hermann Ehrhardt. From 1923 to 1926, Fichte was the leader of this organization in western Germany, and he headed its successor organization, the Nationalklub, there until 1928.

== Career in the Sturmabteilung (SA) ==
On 1 September 1928, Fichte joined the Nazi Party (membership number 98,474). As an early Party member, he later would be awarded the Golden Party Badge. He also joined its paramilitary arm, the Sturmabteilung (SA). On 8 February 1929, he became the adjutant to Curt von Ulrich, the Deputy SA-Leader West in Koblenz. In 1930, he advanced to be Ulrich's deputy and, on 2 April 1931, he received his own command as Führer of SA-Gruppe Nordwest with headquarters in Düsseldorf. In this post, he commanded all the SA units in five Gaue. He was promoted to SA-Gruppenführer on 14 October 1931. From April to June 1932, the SA was banned by the government of Chancellor Heinrich Brüning. After the ban was lifted, Fichte was made Führer of SA-Gruppe Westfalen, based in Münster, on 1 July 1932. Leaving this post at the end of October, he was named to a staff position at the Supreme SA Leadership (OSAF) in Munich. He became an inspector on the staff of the Inspector General of the SA and SS, remaining in this post until 10 May 1933.

Following the Nazi seizure of power, Fichte was made acting Police President of Erfurt in March 1933. He was promoted to SA-Obergruppenführer on 20 July and his police appointment was made permanent on 22 September 1933. He also was named as the leader of the Reich Air Protection League for Landesgruppe XI, consisting of Erfurt and Thuringia. During his tenure as police chief in Erfurt, a "protective custody camp" was established on the site of an abandoned factory at Feldstrasse 18. There, the SA imprisoned over 100 opponents of the regime, mainly Communists and Social Democrats. They were housed in squalid, unhygienic conditions and were abused during "special interrogations". Four individuals were killed before the camp was closed in September 1933.

== Downfall and subsequent life ==
On 2 July 1934, Fichte was arrested in Berlin, along with many other SA leaders, in connection with the Night of the Long Knives. He was incarcerated in the Lichtenburg concentration camp in Prettin and held there until 16 July. He was sentenced to death, but the verdict was overturned by Adolf Hitler. On 7 July, he was dismissed from his position as police chief and expelled from both the SA and the Nazi Party. Fichte then lived until 1937 in Koblenz and made his living as a writer. In 1937, he moved to the Lichterfelde West section of Berlin and was readmitted to the Party under the terms of a pardon granted by Hitler. Fichte served as a Major of reserves in an artillery unit during the Second World War.

After the end of the war, Fichte worked as a laborer in Munich but was arrested and, on 27 September 1948, was charged by the public prosecutor's office in a denazification process. Classified in Class I (major offender), he was sentenced on 6 April 1949 to a two-year detention in a labor camp but was released on the basis of time served. All of his assets in excess of 500 Deutsche Mark were confiscated. However, on 27 July, the appeals court reclassified him as Class III (lesser offender), placed him on six-months probation and waived any additional punitive measures. Fichte died in Munich on 20 June 1955.

== Writings ==
- Morgentor der Freiheit. Eine Dichtung aus deutschen Schicksalstagen (1934)
- Die Sage des Petersklosters zu Erfurt (1934)
- Spukflieger (1940), reprinted as Der Spukflieger (1942)

== See also ==
- Schutzhaftlager Feldstraße

== Sources ==
- Miller, Michael D.; Schulz, Andreas (2015). Leaders of the Storm Troops. Vol. 1. Solihull, England: Helion & Company. ISBN 978-1-909-98287-1.
