= Eberhard Kautter =

German naval and paramilitary officer (1890–unknown)

- Born: 16 May 1890; Marbach am Neckar, Kingdom of Württemberg, German Empire
- Died: Unknown
- Education: Ludwig-Maximilians-Universität München
- Military career
- Allegiance: German Empire
- Branch: Imperial German Navy; Reichsmarine; Marinebrigade Ehrhardt
- Service years: 1909–1920
- Rank: Kapitänleutnant
- Commands: SMS V44
- Conflicts: World War I: Second Battle of Heligoland Bight
- Awards: Iron Cross 1st and 2nd class Knight's Cross 2nd class with swords of the Friedrich Order

Eberhard Kautter (16 May 1890 – unknown) was a German naval officer between 1909 and 1920 who rose to the rank of Kapitänleutnant. Following the end of World War I, he became a member of Marinebrigade Ehrhardt, a Freikorps unit, and the Organisation Consul, a secret society which carried out numerous high-profile assassinations during the Weimar Republic. Kautter had a leading role in organizing its paramilitary successor organization, the Viking League. He joined the Nazi Party in 1937 and worked in the Amt Rosenberg during World War II. He led its effort to dismantle the large social research library at the International Institute of Social History in the occupied Netherlands and ship its contents to Nazi Germany. He also worked as a writer of political propaganda tracts. After the end of the war, he underwent denazification proceedings in 1949 and was adjudged a "follower".

== Early life and naval service ==
Kautter was born at Marbach am Neckar in the Kingdom of Württemberg and, after graduating from secondary school, joined the Imperial German Navy on 1 April 1908. He was promoted to Fähnrich zur See on 10 April 1909, and attended the German Imperial Naval Academy that same year. In 1911, he served aboard the SMS Gneisenau. Promoted on 27 September 1911 to Leutnant zur See, he was assigned to a staff position at the Naval Inspectorate II in Wilhelmshaven in 1912. In 1913, he served aboard the dreadnought battleship SMS Friedrich der Große. On 19 September 1914, he was promoted to Oberleutnant zur See. During World War I, he served as a watch officer on torpedo boats until August 1917. From then until the end of the war, he served as a torpedo boat commander, including aboard SMS V44, which he led in the Second Battle of Heligoland Bight in November 1917. He was promoted to Kapitänleutnant on 28 April 1918. For his war service, Kautter was awarded the Iron Cross 1st and 2nd class and the Knight's Cross 2nd class with swords of the Friedrich Order.

== Freikorps and other paramilitary involvement ==
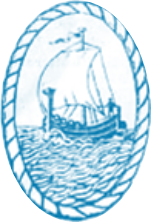
Seal of Der Wiking, official publication of the Organisation Consul

After the war, Kautter joined the Marinebrigade Ehrhardt, led by Hermann Ehrhardt. He became Ehrhardt's adjutant and, later, his deputy. On 9 September 1920, he was discharged from the Reichsmarine and began university studies, initially in law and, later, in economics at the Ludwig-Maximilians-Universität München. When the League of Former Ehrhardt Officers was founded in September 1920, Kautter was named to its executive board and served as its secretary. The Marinebrigade had been banned in the wake of the March 1920 Kapp Putsch, a failed attempt to overthrow the recently established Weimar Republic. Kautter then became a member of the Organisation Consul (O.C.), a secret society dedicated to carrying out political assassinations designed to undermine the republic. He headed Department C, its press department, at its Munich headquarters. Kautter was also the editor of its newspaper, Der Wiking, and participated in drafting the organization's by-laws.

After an investigation into the assassination of Matthias Erzberger, the O.C. was implicated. On 12 September 1921, Kautter was interrogated and admitted that he knew Manfred von Killinger, the organizer of the murder, and also was acquainted with Heinrich Tillessen, Erzberger's assassin. He denied having any knowledge of the crime, nevertheless, an arrest warrant was issued. On 17 October 1921, the Regional Court of Offenburg charged him with "membership in a secret society". On appeal, the Higher Regional Court at Karlsruhe dismissed the charge of complicity on 3 November 1921, and the Criminal Chamber of the Offenburg court dismissed the charge of secret society membership on 7 December 1921. Kautter was subsequently released from custody.

In late 1922, Adolf Hitler offered Kautter command of the Sturmabteilung, the Nazi paramilitary unit, an offer Kautter declined. Following the founding of the Viking League on 3 May 1923, he served as the League's leader on behalf of Ehrhardt, who was at the time being held in investigative custody. When, in late 1922 and early 1923, the consolidation of various nationalist associations under the newly founded German Völkisch Freedom Party began, Kautter rejected participation by the League. As a supporter of the conservative faction surrounding Bavarian General State Commissioner Gustav Ritter von Kahr, Ehrhardt did not participate in Hitler's failed Beer Hall Putsch of 8–9 November 1923. Ehrhardt and Kautter massed their troops, consisting primarily of Viking League formations, in Upper Franconia and stood ready to march against Hitler. However, this action never took place, as the putsch had already collapsed in Munich. After the collapse of the coup and Hitler's arrest, Ehrhardt and Kautter sought to obtain leadership roles in the Kampfbund that Hitler had led, but both were rebuffed.

== Career in Nazi Germany ==
In 1935, Kautter joined the Amt Rosenberg, the eponymous social and cultural organization headed by Nazi theoretician Alfred Rosenberg. On 19 December 1937, he applied for membership in the Nazi Party and was admitted retroactively to 1 May of the same year (membership number 5,919,314). In January 1941, Rosenberg appointed Kautter the director of the International Institute of Social History in occupied Amsterdam. His work there largely consisted of cataloguing and dismantling its large social research library, crating its contents and shipping them to Germany for eventual inclusion in the Advanced School of the NSDAP. This work was accomplished in stages, beginning in June 1942 and extending until September 1944. In the closing days of World War II, Kautter was dismissed from his post with the Amt Rosenberg, effective 16 March 1945, after which he found work as an agricultural laborer.

In June 1949, a denazification court classified Kautter in Category IV–Mitläufer (folllower) and he was fined 10,000 Reichsmarks. His date of death is not documented.

== Selected works ==
- Deutschland in der Weltkrise des Liberalismus (Germany in the Global Crisis of Liberalism). Kohlhammer Verlag, (1933)
- Der Dritte Weg (The Third Way). Kohlhammer Verlag, (1934)
- Sozialismus in deutscher Vergangenheit und Gegenwart (Socialism in the German Past and Present). Hochmuth, (1936)
- Das Sozialproblem im Wandel deutscher Geschichte (The Social Problem in the Course of German History). Hochmuth, (1937)
- Ueber Volksgemeinschaft zur Wehrgemeinschaft (From National Community to Defense Community). Hochmuth, (1938)
- Sozialismus und Wehrwille in deutscher Vergangenheit und Gegenwart (Socialism and the Will to Defend in the German Past and Present). Hochmuth, (1944)

== Sources ==
- Henschke, Ekkehard (2020). Rosenbergs Elite und ihr Nachleben Akademiker im Dritten Reich und nach 1945. Böhlau Verlag Köln. ISBN 978-3-412-51924-7.
- Jablonsky, David (1989). The Nazi Party in Dissolution. Frank Cass and Company, Ltd. ISBN 0-71463-322-4.
- Krüger, Gabriele (1971). Die Ehrhardt Brigade. Leibniz-Verlag. ISBN 978-3-87473-003-7.
- Marine-Offizier-Verband, Albert Stoelzel (ed.): Ehrenrangliste der Kaiserlich Deutschen Marine. 1914–18. Berlin: Thormann & Goetsch, 1930, p. 296.
- Sabrow, Martin (2010). Der Rathenaumord Rekonstruktion einer Verschwörung gegen die Weimarer Republik. Walter de Gruyter. ISBN 978-3-486-70307-8.
