= Viking League =

German right-wing paramilitary unit (1923–1928)

Viking League Bund Wiking
- Leaders: Hermann Ehrhardt; Eberhard Kautter
- Founded: 1923; 103 years ago
- Dissolved: 1928; 98 years ago
- Headquarters: Munich
- Ideology: Anti-republicanism; Völkisch nationalism Authoritarianism; Revanchism
- Political position: Far-right
- Status: Banned
- Size: c.10,000 (1923)

The Viking League (German: Bund Wiking) was a German paramilitary and political organization in existence during the Weimar Republic from 1923 to 1928. It was founded on 2 May 1923 in Munich by members of the banned Organisation Consul as its successor organization, and was led by former Freikorps commander Hermann Ehrhardt. It advocated right-wing nationalism, anti-republicanism and a violent overthrow of the republic in favor of a military dictatorship. At its height, it claimed 10,000 members. After plans to overthrow the republic were exposed in May 1926, the League was banned in Prussia–by far the largest of the German federal states–and its influence declined. Ehrhardt dissolved the Viking League in April 1928.

== Background ==
Following the failed Kapp Putsch of March 1920 that sought to overthrow the newly established Weimar Republic, the Marinebrigade Ehrhardt led by Korvettenkapitän Hermann Ehrhardt, which had taken part on the side of the revolutionaries, was disbanded at the end of May. Ehrhardt soon established a new organization named the Organisation Consul (O.C.). This was a secret underground society, organized along military cadre lines, whose members were recruited largely from mostly front-line former officers of the Imperial German Army, the Imperial German Navy and various Freikorps units. It advocated the violent overthrow of the republic and used terror and political assassination as its primary tactics. Matthias Erzberger, a Centre Party politician who had signed the Armistice of 11 November 1918, was a despised figure by the ultra right-wing fanatics who viewed him as among the so-called "November criminals". The O.C. organized and carried out his assassination on 26 August 1921. This was followed, on 24 June 1922, by the assassination of German Foreign Minister Walther Rathenau, in an attempt to destabilize the government. An investigation revealed the organization's involvement in the assassinations. Ehrhardt fled to Hungary to escape arrest, and the O.C. was banned on the basis of the Law for the Protection of the Republic that was enacted on 21 July 1922.

== Origin and aims ==
Ehrhardt, while still incarcerated, entrusted his deputy, Kapitänleutnant Eberhard Kautter to organize a new paramilitary unit, which was formed in Munich on 2 May 1923 and was named the Viking League. It was mainly composed of former military officers, many of whom were veterans of Ehrhardt's previous components. It also had a large number of younger activist elements, students in particular. These juvenile supporters could join the organization's youth wing, the Young Vikings (Jungwiking). Total membership was estimated to be about 10,000 persons.

Although its stated purpose was to effect "the revival of Germany on a national and ethnic basis through the spiritual education of its members", its actual primary purpose was to provide intensive military training for its members in preparation for the violent overthrow of the Weimar Republic. In its place, the League sought to establish a German military dictatorship that would seek modifications to the Treaty of Versailles by armed means. In addition, it conspired to instigate provocations, such as bombings and other acts of violence, thereby providing the pretext for a coup d'état to restore order. It also opposed separatist movements in border regions such as the Rhineland.

Many leaders of other banned or controversial right-wing organizations used Viking League membership as a way of maintaining continuity for their causes. For example, this included later Nazi Reich Health Leader Leonardo Conti, who had founded the antisemitic newspaper Kampfbund in 1918.

== Activities ==
Ehrhardt managed to escape from detention in July 1923 and spent a brief period in exile in Switzerland. In September, he returned to Munich where he was a supporter of the authoritarian regime of General State Commissioner Gustav Ritter von Kahr. During Adolf Hitler's failed Beer Hall Putsch in November 1923, Ehrhardt and the Viking League supported Kahr. Ehrhardt ordered his formations to assemble along Bavaria's northern border to prepare to march against the Munich putschists. He was prepared to act to help suppress the revolt, but its rapid collapse obviated the need for any armed intervention by the League.

In the immediate post-putsch period, Ehrhardt justified his non-participation by saying: "I don't participate in things which border on lunacy." He moved to displace Hitler in the leadership of the Kampfbund but met with hostility from the member organizations, particularly the Sturmabteilung (SA), the Nazi Party's paramilitary unit, whose high command decreed that there could be no mutual action with Ehrhardt.

On 9 January 1924, Viking League members supplied by Ehrhardt were among a group of about 20 armed men led by Edgar Jung that were responsible for the murder of the Rhenish Palatinate separatist Franz Josef Heinz in Speyer. Two of the assassins, Franz Hellinger and Ferdinand Wiesmann, were killed in an exchange of gunfire with followers of Heinz. Also in January 1924, the police arrested a Viking League member who was actively plotting to assassinate Generaloberst Hans von Seeckt, the chief of the army high command in the Reichswehr.

== Dissolution of the League ==
The League continued to train personnel and make plans for a violent overthrow of the republic. In April 1924, Ehrhardt again fled abroad to evade prosecution by the German government, this time to Austria. In May 1926, the League was banned by Prussian Interior Minister Carl Severing after the discovery of documents disclosing the existence of a plot to establish a dictatorship as a preliminary step toward restoring the Hohenzollern monarchy. When a three-judge panel of the Constitutional Court at Leipzig overturned the basis for the ban in October 1926, Prussia re-imposed the ban on the basis of a different law. On appeal of the initial adverse action, the full court upheld the Prussian ban on 1 May 1927, thereby proscribing the League's existence in Germany's largest federal state.

Meanwhile, Ehrhardt had returned to resume leadership of the League in October 1926, after a general amnesty was declared by Reichspräsident Paul von Hindenburg. However, Ehrhardt's failure to support the Munich putsch had cost him the support of many followers on the anti-republican right, some of whom considered him a traitor to their cause. In addition, the Viking League had lost much of its membership during his prolonged absence and as a result of the Prussian ban. Ehrhardt entered into negotiations for a merger with Der Stahlhelm, the large militant right-wing veterans' group, but no formal agreement was concluded. Despite this, many members ultimately left the League and joined Der Stahlhelm. In February 1928, the Minister of Defense, Wilhelm Groener announced that the government was opening an investigation into contacts between the League and members of the Reichswehr. On 27 April 1928, Ehrhardt dissolved the Viking League, saying: "Armed opposition to the republic has no political future."

Despite the dissolution, some of the League's former members continued to pursue their aims via violent tactics. As late as September 1929, they were among nearly two dozen persons arrested in connection with bombings in Berlin, Hamburg and Schleswig-Holstein.

== Purge in Nazi Germany ==
During the Night of the Long Knives on 30 June 1934, when Hitler took action to eliminate his political opponents, Edgar Jung was among those murdered. As a chief aide to Vice-Chancellor Franz von Papen, Jung had drafted the Marburg speech that Papen delivered on 17 June, criticizing the regime's excesses. Taken into "protective custody" by the Gestapo two days before the purge, he was murdered in his jail cell on 1 July. Despite having joined the Nazi Party, Ehrhardt was also slated to be killed, but just before his SS executioners arrived, he fled into the forest near his estate and later escaped into Austria.

== Selected members ==
In addition to Ehrhardt and Kautter, the following were members of the Viking League who joined the Nazi Party and achieved prominence after the Nazi seizure of power, most as members of its paramilitary units, either the SA or the SS.

- Adolf-Heinz Beckerle
- Helmut Bischoff
- Carl Eduard, Duke of Saxe-Coburg and Gotha
- Leonardo Conti
- Karl Ernst
- Werner von Fichte
- Karl Giering
- Ernst-Albrecht Hildebrandt
- Dietrich von Jagow
- Manfred von Killinger
- Hans Ulrich Klintzsch
- Johann von Leers
- Franz Maria Liedig
- Willy Schmelcher
- Karl Eberhard Schöngarth
- Emil Sembach
- Albert Stange
- Horst Wessel
- Philipp Wurzbacher
