= Franz Maria Liedig =

Germal naval officer and resistance member (1900–1967)

- Born: 2 February 1900; Hünfeld, Kingdom of Prussia, German Empire
- Died: 30 March 1967 (aged 67); Munich, Bavaria, West Germany
- Military career
- Allegiance: German Empire; Nazi Germany
- Branch: Imperial German Navy; Reichsmarine; Kriegsmarine
- Service years: 1916–1920; 1936–1944
- Rank: Leutnant zur See; Fregattenkapitän
- Conflicts: World War I World War II

Franz Maria Liedig (2 February 1900 – 30 March 1967) was a German naval officer who served in the navies of the German Empire, the Weimar Republic and Nazi Germany. In the late 1930s, he joined the resistance movement within the German military. He was arrested after the failed 20 July plot to assassinate Adolf Hitler and was interned in several Nazi concentration camps. Liberated at the end of the Second World War, he was a founding member of the Christian Social Union in Bavaria.

== Early life and naval service ==
Liedig was born in Hünfeld the son of a physician, and volunteered for the German Imperial Navy in October 1916 during the First World War. He was trained at the Naval Academy Mürwik and served as a watch officer on a torpedo boat. After the end of the war, he was discharged to the reserves in December 1918. After a brief internment at Scapa Flow, he was promoted to Leutnant zur See in September 1919 and initially began studies at the Technical University of Munich. Liedig became a member of the Marinebrigade Ehrhardt, a Freikorps unit that was deployed in Berlin and Upper Silesia from 1919 to 1920. He was also a participant in the Kapp Putsch in March 1920 that tried to overthrow the newly formed Weimar Republic. Liedig left the Reichsmarine in September 1920 and was active in right-wing paramilitary organisations through most the 1920s, including the Viking League and Der Stahlhelm. From 1928 onward, however, Liedig distanced himself from these groups. He returned to school, earned a doctorate, became a lawyer and was for a time a member of the law faculty at the Ludwig-Maximilians-Universität München.

== Service with the Abwehr ==
In 1936, Liedig returned to military service and joined the Kriegsmarine at the instigation of Admiral Wilhelm Canaris, head of the military intelligence service Abwehr, who knew Liedig from his Freikorps days. Liedig was assigned to Abwehr Office V in Stuttgart, becoming the office chief later that year. His direct superior was Hans Oster, through whom he came in contact with members of the German military resistance. Around 20 September 1938, the leading members of that opposition, including Oster, Hans von Dohnanyi, Erwin von Witzleben, Hans Bernd Gisevius and, assumedly, Carl Friedrich Goerdeler, met with Liedig and Abwehr Hauptmann Friedrich Wilhelm Heinz at Oster's house in Berlin. Liedig and Heinz were instructed to form an assault group to storm the Reich Chancellery and arrest Adolf Hitler. After Witzleben left that meeting, both decided to shoot Hitler if possible. After Hitler's diplomatic triumph at the Munich Conference on 28 September, which averted the immediate threat of war, the plans were shelved.

== Second World War ==
On 8 October 1939, Liedig drove Oster to the Dutch military attaché in Berlin, Colonel Bert Sas. After Oster returned to the car, he told Liedig, that he had just committed treason. In fact, Oster informed Sas about the date of the planned Wehrmacht offensive in the west. In 1940, Liedig became the military attaché at the German embassy in Sofia and later on in Athens. In February 1944, he was assigned as the first officer of the light cruiser Köln at Oslo.

== Arrest and incarceration ==
After the failure of the 20 July plot to assassinate Hitler, Canaris, Dohnanyi and Oster were arrested by the Gestapo. The 1938 coup plans were found in the Abwehr files on 22 September 1944, and Korvettenkapitän Liedig was arrested in November 1944. He was imprisoned at several concentration camps including Flossenbürg, Buchenwald and Dachau. In late April 1945, he was transferred to Niederdorf together with about 140 other prominent inmates, where the SS abandoned them.

== Post-war life ==
Liedig was a founding member of the Christian Social Union in Bavaria in 1945 and served as the state managing director between 1946 and 1948. He ended his political involvement in the early 1950s. Liedig died in 1967.

== See also ==
- Oster conspiracy
