= Albert Stange =

German policeman and Nazi Party politician (1899–unknown)

Acting Police President of Harburg-Wilhelmsburg
- In office November 1934 – October 1935
- Preceded by: Carl Friedrich Christiansen

Acting Police President of Erfurt
- In office August 1934 – November 1934
- Preceded by: Werner von Fichte

Additional positions
- 1933–1935: Prussian State Council
- 1929–1934: Provincial Landtag, Province of Saxony

Personal details
- Born: Franz Albert Stange; 17 January 1899 Plaue, Ilm-Kreis, Schwarzburg-Sondershausen, German Empire
- Died: Unknown
- Party: Nazi Party
- Occupation: Police officer

Military service
- Allegiance: German Empire
- Branch/service: Imperial German Army; Freikorps
- Years of service: 1918–1919
- Rank: Unteroffizier
- Unit: 71st (3rd Thuringian) Infantry Regiment; 467th Infantry Regiment; Freiwilligen Landesjägercorps
- Battles/wars: World War I
- Awards: Iron Cross, 2nd class

Franz Albert Stange (17 January 1899 – unknown) was a German police official and Nazi Party politician active in the later years of the Weimar Republic and the early years of Nazi Germany. He was a deputy in the provincial Landtag of the Province of Saxony from 1929 to 1934, and sat as a member of the Prussian State Council from 1933. He served as the acting police president in Erfurt and in Harburg-Wilhelmsburg from 1934 to October 1935 when he was dismissed from all his posts. Little is documented about his subsequent life.

== Early life ==
Stange was born in Plaue in 1899, attended public Volksschule in Erfurt and began an insurance apprenticeship. He then attended non-commissioned officer preparatory schools, first in Sigmaringen from April 1914 to January 1916, and then in Treptow an der Rega (today, Trzebiatów) from January 1916 to April 1918. At that point, he entered military service with the Imperial German Army and participated in the First World War as an Unteroffizier with the 71st (3rd Thuringian) Infantry Regiment and the 467th Infantry Regiment, earning the Iron Cross, 2nd class. Following the end of the war in November 1918, he served until 1919 in a Freikorps unit, the Freiwilligen Landesjägercorps, and took part in fighting in Berlin and central Germany. In 1919, he became a member of Der Stahlhelm, the German war veterans organization.

Also in 1919, he joined the security police at Erfurt and took part in fighting in Gotha in 1920, as well as in Eisleben and in the Leuna area in 1921. He left after the end of the fighting that year and became a worker in the coal mines in Geiselthal (today, Giżyn). Also in 1921, he joined the Viking League, a nationalist paramilitary organization. In November of the same year, he joined the Thuringian police service but was removed in mid-1922 for political reasons. From 1922 to 1926, he was employed as a railway maintenance worker, gardener and office worker in Erfurt. In 1926, he became office manager at the Central German Craftsmen Association and managing director of the National Socialist Fighting League for the Commercial Middle Class in Erfurt.

== Nazi Party career ==
On 5 November 1922, Stange became a co-founder of the Erfurt Ortsgruppe (local group) of the Nazi Party and served as the local propaganda leader in Erfurt until 1929. In 1929, he was promoted to Party Untergauleiter in Erfurt, and then Bezirksleiter (district leader). Stange was elected to the provincial Landtag of the Province of Saxony on 17 November 1929, serving until its abolition on 30 January 1934. In 1933, after the Nazi seizure of power, Stange became vice president of the Chamber of Commerce for the Erfurt Regierungsbezirk (government district) and the Schmalkalden district. In July 1933, he was appointed Staatskommissar (state commissioner) for the Thuringian economic region.

In April 1933, Stange was elected to the Prussian State Council, serving until its dissolution on 10 July 1933, and was then immediately appointed by Prussian Minister president Hermann Göring to the newly reconstituted Prussian State Council. In October 1933, Stange became a member of the State Debt Committee in Berlin. In August 1934, he was named acting police president in Erfurt. From November 1934, he was acting police president in Harburg-Wilhelmsburg, but the appointment was revoked in October 1935 for unknown reasons. At the same time, he also was removed from his positions on the State Debt Committee and the Prussian State Council. Nothing further is recorded about his life.

== Sources ==
- Albert Stange entry in Das Deutsche Führerlexikon 1934-1935
- Lilla, Joachim (2005). Der Preußische Staatsrat 1921–1933: Ein biographisches Handbuch. Düsseldorf: Droste Verlag. ISBN 978-3-770-05271-4.
- Stockhorst, Erich (1985). 5000 Köpfe: Wer War Was im 3. Reich. Arndt. ISBN 978-3-887-41116-9.
