= Günther Brandt =

German anthropologist and political activist

- Born: 1 October 1898
- Died: 4 July 1973 (aged 74)
- Occupations: Anthropologist at the SS Race and Settlement Main Office; Officer in the Kriegsmarine
- Awards: Knight's Cross of the Iron Cross

Günther Brandt (1 October 1898 – 4 July 1973) was a German anthropologist and political activist during the Nazi era.

Following World War I, Brandt joined the "Marinebrigade Ehrhardt" and fought with the Freikorps in the Spartacist uprising of the German Revolution in Berlin, and in the Silesian Uprisings against the Poles and Polish Silesians of Upper Silesia. In 1921 he joined the Nazi Party and was involved in the assassination of the Foreign Minister Walther Rathenau in June 1922. He was sentenced to four years imprisonment in 1925. He was released early and studied medicine from 1926 to 1932 in Kiel, Berlin and Munich.

Brandt was also an SS officer with the final rank of Obersturmbannführer. During World War II, he served in the Kriegsmarine and was a recipient of the Knight's Cross of the Iron Cross.

== Awards ==
- Iron Cross (1914) 2nd Class (8 December 1917)
- Silesian Eagle 2nd Class (1 October 1919)
- Clasp to the Iron Cross (1939) 2nd Class (9 January 1940) & 1st Class (30 August 1940)
- German Cross in Gold on 26 November 1942 as Korvettenkapitän of the Reserves in the 12. U-Jagd-Flottille
- Knight's Cross of the Iron Cross on 23 December 1943 as Korvettenkapitän of the Reserves and chief of the 21. U-Jagd-Flottille
