= Hermann Ehrhardt =

German Freikorps commander

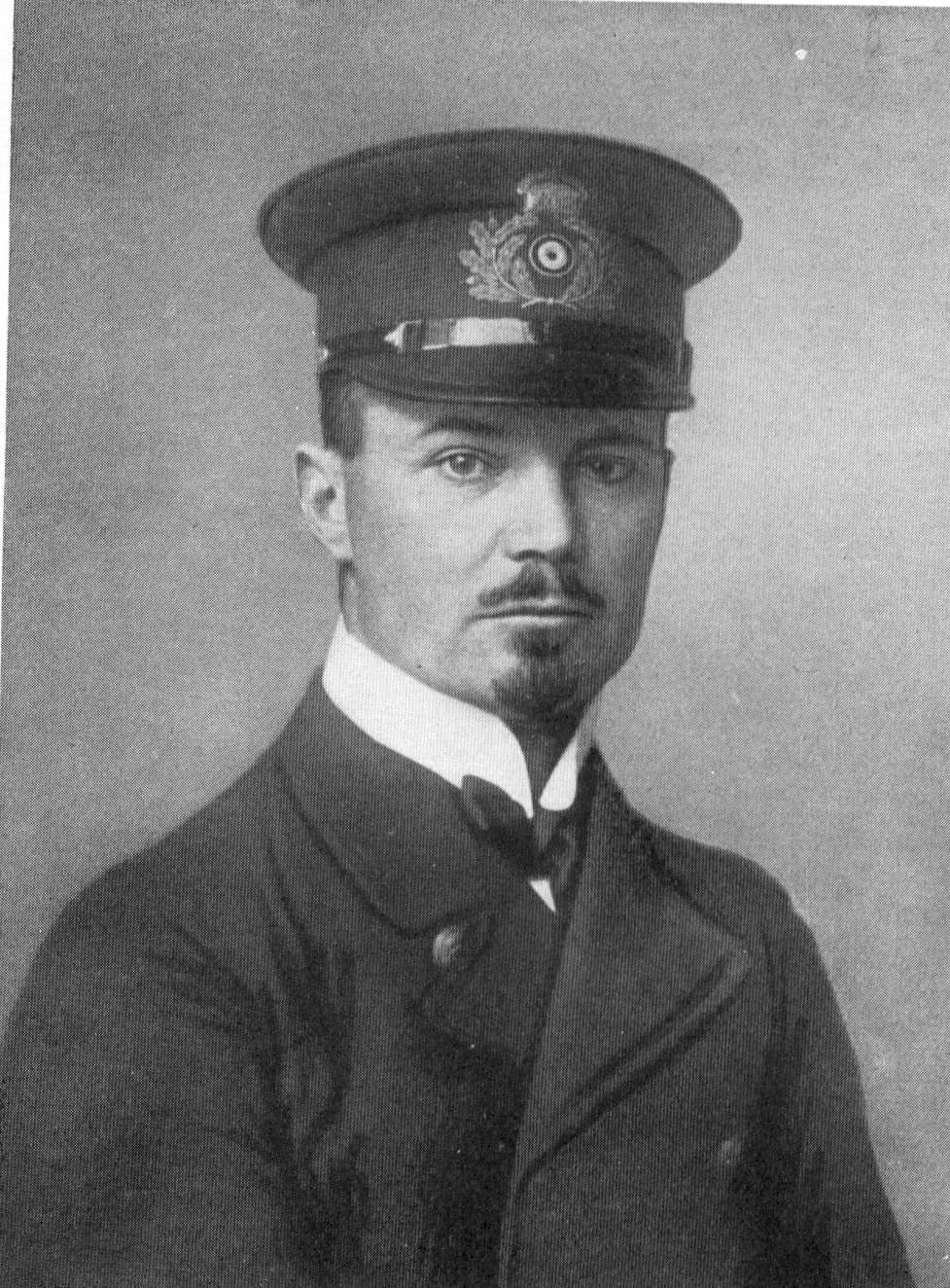
- Ehrhardt in 1916
- Born: 27 November 1881; Diersburg, Grand Duchy of Baden, German Empire
- Died: 27 September 1971 (aged 89); Brunn am Walde, Lower Austria, Republic of Austria
- Military career
- Allegiance: German Empire
- Branch: Imperial German Navy
- Service years: 1899–1918
- Rank: Korvettenkapitän
- Commands: IX. Torpedo Boat Flotilla; Marinebrigade Ehrhardt
- Conflicts: Herero Wars; World War I: Battle of Jutland; Kapp Putsch; Silesian Uprisings

Hermann Ehrhardt (29 November 1881 – 27 September 1971) was a German naval officer in World War I who became an anti-republican and antisemitic German nationalist Freikorps leader during the Weimar Republic. As head of the Marinebrigade Ehrhardt, he was among the best-known Freikorps leaders in the immediate postwar years. The brigade fought against the local soviet republics that arose during the German Revolution of 1918–1919 and later was among the key players in the anti-republican Kapp Putsch of March 1920.

After the brigade's forced disbanding, Ehrhardt used the remnants of his unit to found the Organisation Consul, a secret group that committed numerous politically motivated assassinations. After it was banned in 1922, Ehrhardt formed other less successful groups such as the Viking League. Because of his opposition to Adolf Hitler, Ehrhardt was forced to flee Germany in 1934 and lived apolitically in Austria until his death in 1971.

== Early life and World War I ==
Hermann Ehrhardt was born in 1881 into a family that had long provided pastors for Diersburg (now part of Hohberg, Baden-Württemberg) in the Grand Duchy of Baden. On 13 August 1927, Ehrhardt married Margarethe Viktoria, Princess of Hohenlohe-Öhringen (1894–1976). They had two children, Marie Elisabeth and Hermann Georg. As a primary school student, Ehrhardt slapped his teacher's face out of a bruised sense of honor and had to leave the grammar school in Lörrach.

In 1899, he joined the Imperial Navy as a cadet and entered into a naval officer's career. In 1904, as a Leutnant zur See (the lowest officer rank in the German navy), he took part under Lieutenant Colonel Ludwig von Estorff in the Herero and Namaqua genocide in German South West Africa.

At the beginning of World War I, Ehrhardt was a captain lieutenant in charge of a torpedo boat half-flotilla. In the Battle of Jutland, his group participated in the sinking of the British M-class destroyer HMS Nomad, though his group's flagship, the SMS V27, was sunk in action. Ehrhardt's half-flotilla was transferred to Flanders in October 1916 for anti-submarine duties in the English Channel. After being promoted to corvette captain (Korvettenkapitän) in 1917, he was given command of the 9th Torpedo Boat Flotilla and remained in that capacity until the end of the war.

Under the terms of the Armistice of 11 November 1918, he led his unit to Scapa Flow, where the Germans scuttled the ships in 1919. Before that was done, Ehrhardt returned to Wilhelmshaven on a transport ship with most of his former crew. When they mutinied in the face of the dangerous mine belt off the German coast and refused to proceed, Ehrhardt forcibly took command and brought the ship safely to port.

== Marine Brigade Ehrhardt ==
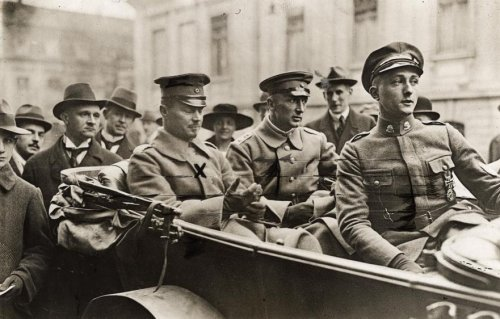
Captain Hermann Ehrhardt, marked with a cross in the photograph, enters Berlin in a car with marine troops, Kapp-Lüttwitz-Putsch, 13 March 1920.

On 27 January 1919 communists proclaimed the Wilhelmshaven Soviet Republic (Räterepublik). Ehrhardt gathered about 300 men, mostly professional soldiers from the Imperial German Navy, and with them stormed the 1,000-man barracks where the revolutionaries had entrenched themselves. The resistance quickly collapsed, and as a result of the success, the government in Berlin called for the formation of a volunteer unit in Wilhelmshaven.

The formation of the Second Marine Brigade Wilhelmshaven was completed on 17 February 1919. From 1 March, it was called Marine Brigade Ehrhardt after its leader. At the time of its deployment to Munich in April/May 1919, it was divided into the Officers' Assault Company, the Wilhelmshaven Company, Marine Regiments 3 and 4, a flamethrower platoon, the 1st and 2nd Mortar Companies, the 1st and 2nd Engineer Companies, and a battery of light field howitzers (10.5 cm caliber) and a battery of field guns (7.7 cm caliber). The total strength at that time was about 1,500 men.

After recruitment and training were completed, the brigade received orders in April 1919 to intervene under the command of General Georg Ludwig Rudolf Maercker against the attempts to establish a soviet republic in Braunschweig. The Freikorps met with no resistance, and the revolutionary leaders fled.

The 37-year-old Ehrhardt was not prepared to acknowledge Germany's defeat in the war, the revolution that had broken out in November 1918, or the new socialist-led government in Berlin. With his Freikorps unit, he had created the means to express his will. Ehrhardt's brigade quelled riots across central Germany and on 30 April 1919 was in place outside of Munich as part of about 30,000 men preparing to attack the Bavarian Soviet Republic. The united Freikorps units proceeded brutally against the rebellion, and by 2 May, the fighting was essentially over.

In June, the brigade was deployed in Berlin against a transportation strike and in August in Upper Silesia against the Poles who in the First Silesian Uprising were fighting German control of the region. Towards the end of 1919, the force was replenished with returnees from former Freikorps in the Baltic units, growing to about 4,000 men. Ehrhardt and his unit spent the turn of the year 1919/1920 at rest at the Döberitz military training area near Berlin. The period was used in part for political lectures meant to radicalise the Marine Brigade Ehrhardt.

Ehrhardt found in Wolfgang Kapp and General Walther von Lüttwitz, at the time commander-in-chief of the Berlin Reichswehr Group Command I, two men who were determined to reverse the results of the revolution. The Reich government ordered the disbanding of the Marine Brigade Ehrhardt and other Freikorps units in early March 1920 under pressure from the Allies, who were overseeing the fulfillment of the terms of the Versailles Peace Treaty. Lüttwitz protested the dissolution of the Freikorps by calling for the resignation of both the Reich president and the government. He was subsequently dismissed and on 13 March 1920 instigated the Kapp-Lüttwitz Putsch. Lüttwitz placed himself at the head of the Marine Brigade Ehrhardt, which through an influx of wildcat units had grown to between 2,000 and 6,000 men, and occupied Berlin's government quarter.

Workers responded en masse to a government call for a general strike, and as a result, the putschists, even though a considerable part of the Reichswehr was behind them, gave up their hastily planned attempt to overthrow the government on 17 March. The Marine Brigade marched back to Döberitz, and on 30 March 1920, Ehrhardt held the last review of his Freikorps before it was officially disbanded on 31 May. He himself was honorably discharged from the Reichsmarine on 10 September. A warrant was issued for his arrest, but he was able to escape by fleeing to Munich, where he was not prosecuted. His escape was financed by Heinrich Claß, chairman of the Pan-German League.

== Organisation Consul, Bund Wiking and contacts with the Nazis ==
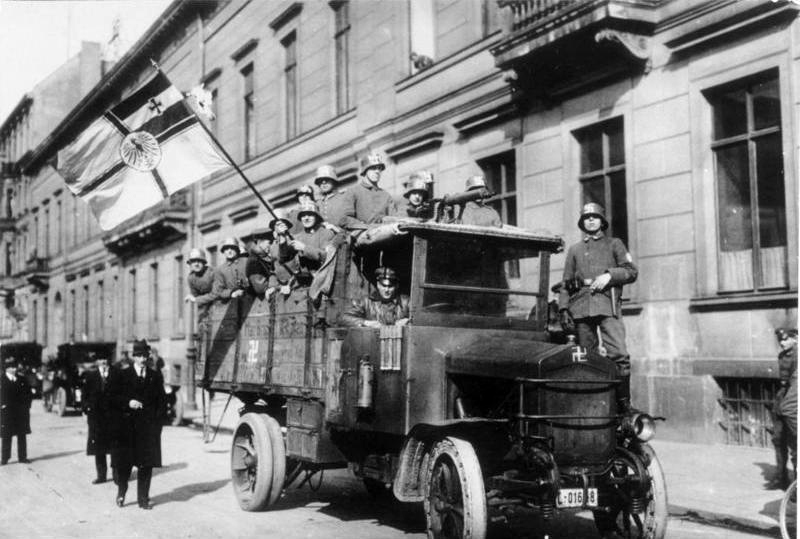
Marine Brigade Ehrhardt troops during the Kapp Putsch in 1920. Note the swastikas on their helmets and vehicle.

After the Marine Brigade Ehrhardt was disbanded, some of the soldiers were incorporated into the regular Reichswehr. In the fall of 1920, the rest of the unit formed the Organisation Consul, an underground right-wing organization that used assassinations to try to provoke a coup from the left so that it could then offer its support to the Reich government in fighting it. Ehrhardt hoped in that way to gain enough influence to be able to change the constitution to make Germany a dictatorship.

Members of the Organisation Consul planned and carried out the assassinations of the former Minister of Finance Matthias Erzberger (26 August 1921) and Foreign Minister Walther Rathenau (24 June 1922) and the attempted assassination of former Minister President Philipp Scheidemann (4 June 1922). The "Consul" in the Organisation Consul was Ehrhardt himself, who had an aide-de-camp and his own staff. Together, they controlled all aspects of the tightly run military organization.

In the aftermath of Erzberger's murder, Ehrhardt fled to Hungary to escape imminent arrest. In the absence of its leader, the Organisation Consul disintegrated and was banned by the Act for the Protection of the Republic (Gesetz zum Schutze der Republik) on 21 July 1922. Otto Pittinger, the leader of the moderate-right Bund Bayern und Reich (League for Bavaria and Reich) seized the opportunity and tried to win over and de-radicalize the Ehrhardt group, giving rise to the Neudeutsche Bund (New German League), which tried to unite the former fighters of the Ehrhardt Brigade. Ehrhardt himself, who had returned from exile, joined the movement but was arrested in November 1922.

From prison in 1923, Ehrhardt instructed Captain Lieutenant Eberhard Kautter to reorganise the New German League. It then became the Viking League (Bund Wiking), which operated throughout the Reich, and according to its own figures, there were about 10,000 members. In July 1923, Ehrhardt escaped from prison and fled to Switzerland before returning to Munich on 29 September. He supported the conservative group around Bavarian State Commissioner Gustav Ritter von Kahr, who wanted a right-wing dictatorship to replace the Weimar Republic, but not one under Adolf Hitler's leadership. Ehrhardt then prepared himself to oppose the Hitler-Ludendorff Beer Hall Putsch on 8/9 November 1923. He assembled his troops – consisting mainly of formations of the Viking League – in Upper Franconia and was ready to march against Hitler, but by then the putsch had already failed in Munich.

Ehrhardt had had early contact with Hitler and his National Socialist movement. When Ernst Röhm was looking for experienced men to lead his Sturmabteilung (SA), he turned to Ehrhardt. At first, Ehrhardt wanted nothing to do with Hitler and said, "Good God, what does the idiot want now?" He eventually let Röhm persuade him and transferred several of his men to Hitler. Hans Ulrich Klintzsch, a lieutenant in the Organisation Consul, became head of the SA, and Alfred Hoffmann, an Ehrhardt man, became chief of staff. But just two months later, Ehrhardt ended his association with Hitler and the SA and withdrew some of his men.

After the 1923 Beer Hall Putsch, Ehrhardt lost his standing with the radical right-wing forces in Munich. He was considered a traitor because he had opposed Hitler. As a result, the Viking League also lost importance. In April 1924, Ehrhardt again fled to Austria to evade prosecution by the German Reich. He returned in October 1926 after an amnesty by the new Reich president, Paul von Hindenburg. In the meantime, the Viking League had lost so much of its importance that Ehrhardt felt compelled to enter into negotiations with Der Stahlhelm, a right-wing veterans group, into which the League was to be absorbed. The negotiations failed, and on 27 April 1928, the Viking League was dissolved.

Ehrhardt later contested for dominance over the revolutionary right against Hitler, but he was unsuccessful, with many of Ehrhardt's men joining the Nazi Party. The Gefolgschaft (fellowship) founded in 1931 by Ehrhardt and ex-Marine Brigade Ehrhardt member Hartmut Plaas brought together 2,000 of his followers along with disappointed National Socialists and Communists who wanted to prevent Hitler from taking power and who above all denounced the demagoguery of the Nazis. Ehrhardt became involved in attempts to destabilise the Nazis and worked behind the scenes to forge an alliance between dissident SA leader Walter Stennes and Black Front leader Otto Strasser. Ultimately the initiative was not a success. Strasser abandoned Stennes when he learned that Ehrhardt was behind the plan to link the two leaders.

Some of Ehrhardt's followers later became involved with the resistance to Nazism. They included journalist Friedrich Wilhelm Heinz, press officer Herbert von Bose and editor Hartmut Plaas. The historian Armin Mohler pointed to the connections that leading members of the military resistance, such as Admiral Wilhelm Canaris and General Hans Oster, had to Ehrhardt.

On 28 June 1933, the newspaper Westhavelländische Tageszeitung reported that the SS had announced that "Captain Ehrhardt has declared his allegiance to the Nazi Party". He had "personally joined the party" and "had subordinated himself along with his military unit, the Brigade Ehrhardt, to the Reichsführer of the SS." The Ehrhardt Brigade stayed in the SS only a short time. After Ehrhardt was promoted to SS-Gruppenführer in the second half of January 1934, the association was dissolved by SS-Reichsführer Heinrich Himmler on 1 February 1934.

Ehrhardt's life was also in danger. Along with many other former opponents of Hitler, he was to be murdered during the Nazi internal purge known as the Night of the Long Knives in June/July 1934. He fled in time, first from the SS to a forest near his estate, then to Switzerland. In 1936, he went to Austria with his family and ran the manorial estate Schloss Brunn am Walde near Lichtenau im Waldviertel. Until his death in 1971, he lived as a farmer and was no longer politically or militarily active.

== Antisemitism ==
In her 1971 book Die Brigade Ehrhardt, Gabriele Krüger supported the claim made by Ernst von Salomon, an Organisation Consul member who later became a novelist, that Ehrhardt was not an antisemite. He was "first and foremost a soldier, politically without any ideas of his own." The military historian Wolfram Wette, however, ranked Ehrhardt among "the anti-Semitic desperados of the postwar period" who did not find their way back into civilian life after World War I. Wette wrote that all Organisation Consul assassinations were guided by the delusion of a Jewish Bolshevism. Historian Hubertus Büschel called Ehrhardt "one of the best known and most wanted anti-Semitic, German nationalist, anti-republican Freikorps leaders."
