= Hohberg =

- Municipality
- Coat of arms

- Location of Hohberg within Ortenaukreis district
- Interactive map of Hohberg
- Location within Germany Location within Baden-Württemberg
- Coordinates: 48°25′26″N 07°54′30″E
- Country: Germany
- State: Baden-Württemberg
- Admin. region: Freiburg
- District: Ortenaukreis

Government
  - Mayor (2021–29): Andreas Heck (CDU)

Area
  - Total: 28.95 km^{2} (11.18 sq mi)
- Elevation: 179 m (587 ft)

Population (2025-12-31)
  - Total: 8,143
  - Density: 281.3/km^{2} (728.5/sq mi)
- Time zone: UTC+01:00 (CET)
  - Summer (DST): UTC+02:00 (CEST)
- Postal codes: 77749
- Dialling codes: 07808
- Vehicle registration: OG, BH, KEL, LR, WOL
- Website: www.hohberg.de

Hohberg (German pronunciation: [ˈhoːbɛʁk]; Low Alemannic: Hohberig) is a municipality in the district of Ortenau in Baden-Württemberg in Germany.
