= Adolf von Trotha =

German admiral (1868–1940)

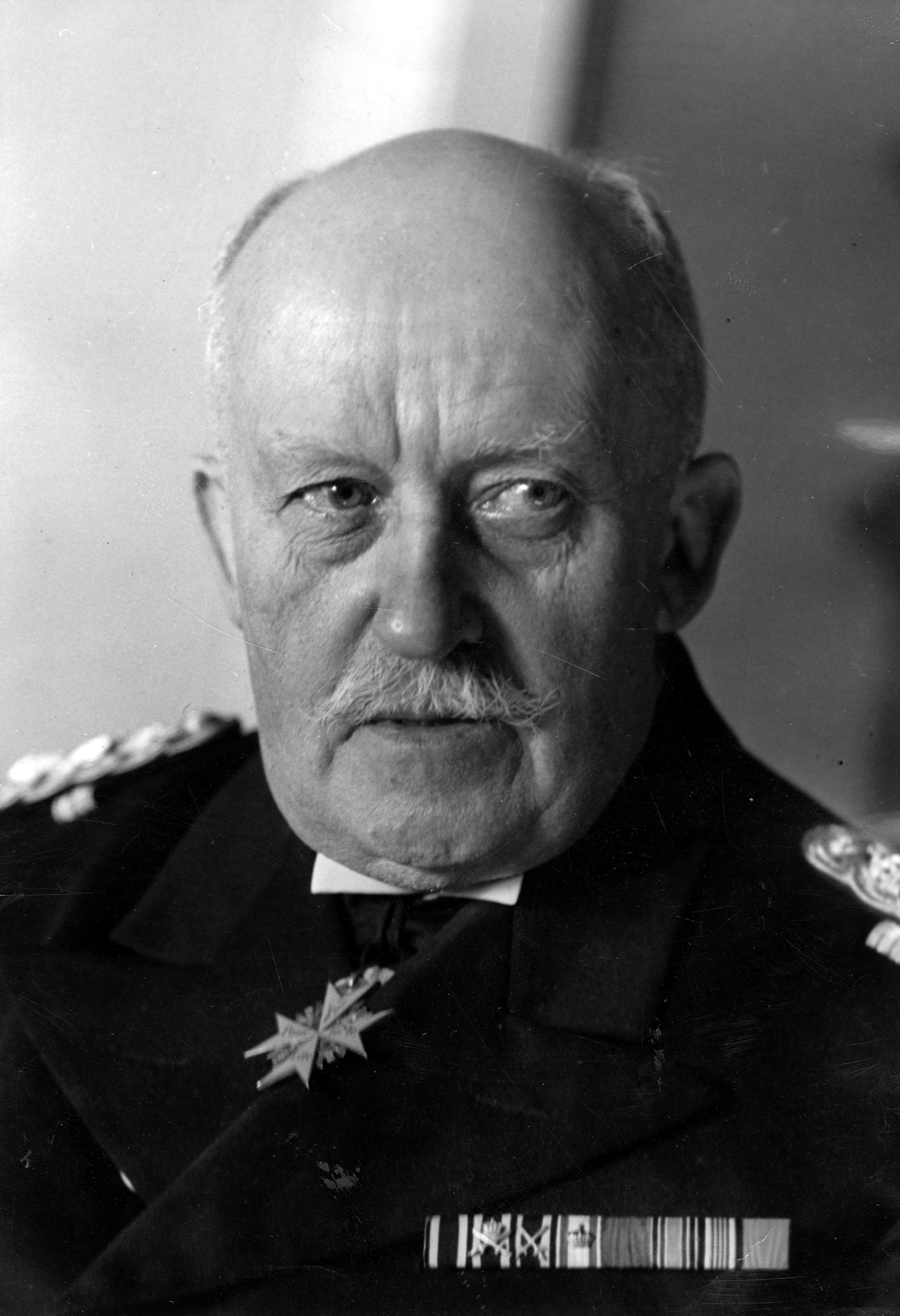
- Born: 1 March 1868; Koblenz, Kingdom of Prussia
- Died: 11 October 1940 (aged 72); Berlin, Nazi Germany
- Spouse: Anna von Veltheim
- Military career
- Allegiance: German Empire
- Branch: Imperial German Navy; Vorläufige Reichsmarine (1919-20)
- Service years: 1886–1920
- Rank: Admiral (1939)
- Commands: SMS S 60; SMS D 3; SMS S 32; SMS S 65; SMS Königsberg; SMS Kaiser; Chef der Admiralität (1919-20)
- Conflicts: Boxer Rebellion; World War I
- Awards: Pour le Mérite; Iron Cross

Adolf von Trotha (1 March 1868 – 11 October 1940) was a German admiral in the Kaiserliche Marine. After the German revolution he briefly served as the first Chef der Admiralität, which replaced the imperial Reichsmarineamt. After supporting the Kapp-Lüttwitz Putsch of March 1920 he resigned his post. He later held several political and maritime posts in the Third Reich.

== Family ==
Trotha was born 1 March 1868 at Koblenz, at the time part of the Rhine Province of the Kingdom of Prussia. Trotha was the third son of Karl von Trotha (1834–1870), who was killed in the Franco-Prussian War, when his son was only two years old. Trotha married Anna von Veltheim (15 January 1877 – 8 August 1964) on 4 June 1902, the daughter of Fritz von Veltheim and Elizabeth von Krosigk.

== Naval career ==
Trotha entered the Imperial Navy in 1886 as an officer candidate and was promoted to Leutnant zur See in 1891. He served as a commander of the torpedo boat D3 and as a navigations officer on the small cruiser SMS Seeadler. In 1900 he was a staff officer at Tianjin. From 1914 to 1918, Trotha served in World War I. In 1916 he became Chief of Staff of the High Seas Fleet.

As Chef der Admiralität from March 1919 Trotha was a (non-voting) ex-officio member of the first two cabinets of the Weimar Republic, the Scheidemann cabinet and the Bauer cabinet from March 1919 until March 1920.

In March 1920, he supported the failed Kapp Putsch and resigned his post. He retired from the navy in October 1920 with the rank of Vizeadmiral.

== Career under the Third Reich ==
After retirement, Trotha took over the management of the Grossdeutscher Jugendbund (Greater German Youth League) in 1921. In October 1931 he was one of the participants in the Harzburg Front march of Nazis and other anti-democratic right-wing nationalists. After the Nazi seizure of power he became a Provincial Councillor for the Province of Brandenburg and Posen-West Prussia. Prussian Minister President Hermann Göring also appointed him to the Prussian State Council on 13 September 1933.

On 23 March 1934, the Reich Federation of German Seafaring was founded under Trotha's chairmanship; this was the successor organization to the Navy League. Trotha was made honorary leader of the Marine Hitler Youth on 15 February 1935. On 1 March 1938, he was awarded the Golden Party Badge. From 4 March 1939, he also served as the honorary chairman of the German High Seas Sport Federation. In August 1939, he was granted the title of Admiral. After his death on 11 October 1940 a state funeral was held in Berlin.

== Honours and awards ==
- Kingdom of Prussia:
  - Pour le Mérite (military)
  - Knight of the Red Eagle, 4th Class with Swords and Crown; 3rd Class with Swords on Ring; 2nd Class on Double Black and Triple White Band
  - Knight of the Royal Crown Order, 2nd Class
  - Knight's Cross of the Royal House Order of Hohenzollern, with Swords
  - Service Award Cross
  - Iron Cross (1914), 1st Class
- Kingdom of Bavaria: Officer of the Military Merit Order
- Mecklenburg-Schwerin: Knight of the Griffon
- Kingdom of Saxony: Commander of the Albert Order, 2nd Class
- Württemberg: Commander of the Friedrich Order, 2nd Class

== Sources ==
- Hildebrand, Hans; Henriot, Ernest (1990). Deutschlands Admirale 1849-1945: die militärischen Werdegänge der See-, Ingenieur-, Sanitäts-, Waffen- und Verwaltungsoffiziere im Admiralsrang (in German). Vol. 3, P–Z. Osnabrück: Biblio-Verl. pp. 460–461. ISBN 3764814993.
- Bird, Keith W.: The Role of Admiral von Trotha in the Collapse of the Navy and the Restoration of the Authority of the Naval Officer Corps, September 1918 – March 1920. In: Fischer, Rolf; Kuhl, Klaus (Ed.): Nach der Kieler Revolution 1918. Hoffnungen, Zweifel, Enttäuschungen. Kiel 2026, S. 51–56.
