= Marinebrigade Ehrhardt =

Volunteer military force (Freikorps) in Germany from 1919 to 1920

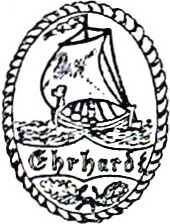
- Logo of the Marinebrigade Erhardt
- Leader: Hermann Ehrhardt
- Founded: 17 February 1919
- Dates active: February 1919–March 1920
- Dissolved: May 1920
- Country: Germany
- Allegiance: Freikorp
- Status: Banned
- Size: 6,000

The Marinebrigade Ehrhardt, also known as the Ehrhardt Brigade, was a Freikorps unit of the early Weimar Republic. It was formed on 17 February 1919 as the Second Marine Brigade from members of the former Imperial German Navy under the leadership of Hermann Ehrhardt. The brigade was used primarily in the suppression of the Bavarian Soviet Republic and the First Silesian Uprising, both in the first half of 1919. In March 1920, faced with its imminent disbanding by orders of the government in Berlin, the Marine Brigade was one of the main supporters of the Kapp Putsch that tried to overthrow the Weimar Republic. After the putsch failed and the brigade was disbanded in May, many of the former members formed the secret Organisation Consul under Ehrhardt's leadership. Before it was banned in 1922, it carried out numerous assassinations and murders in a continuation of the attempts to overthrow the Republic.

== Formation and structure ==
On 27 January 1919, during the Revolution of 1918–1919 that broke out following Germany's defeat in World War I, communist putschists from Bremen and Wilhelmshaven captured important buildings in Wilhelmshaven and declared it a socialist council republic (Räterepublik). When the putschists encountered isolated resistance, they entrenched themselves in the city's 1,000-man barracks. About 300 officers and professional sailors of the former Imperial Navy, including Corvette Captain (Korvettenkapitän) Hermann Ehrhardt, then armed themselves and stormed the barracks using rifles and machine guns. In the morning of 28 January, the 400 putschists surrendered. The fighting had left a total of eight dead on both sides. The "storming of the 1,000-man barracks" was later considered the Marine Brigade's birth.

The Reich government then decided to raise volunteer troops in Wilhelmshaven to fight other soviet republics such as the one in Bremen that lasted until 4 February 1919. Wilhelmshaven was chosen because it was a former port of the Imperial Navy and full of soldiers, many of whom were opposed to radical leftist efforts to set up communist governments in Germany.

On 13 February 1919 an advertisement appeared in the Wilhelmshaven daily newspaper Die Republik of the Majority Social Democrats, the party that led the Reich government in Berlin. It contained in part the following:

Call for the formation of a government brigade in Wilhelmshaven. The Reich government has given me the order to form a government brigade in Wilhelmshaven, which, directly subordinate to the government, will be at the government's disposal for the Grenzschutz Ost [Border Protection East]. signed by the head of the Naval Station North Sea, [Andreas] Michelsen.

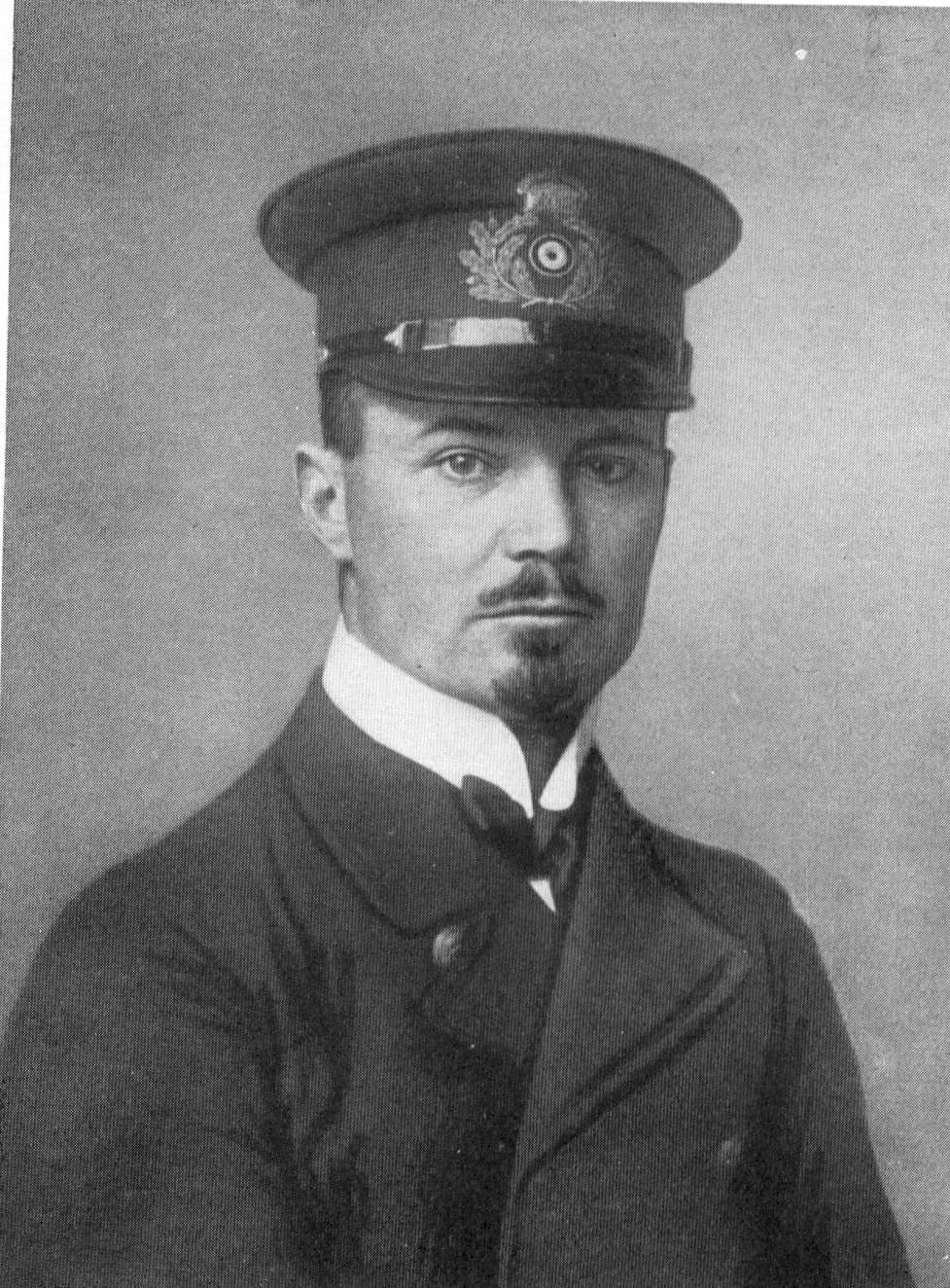
Hermann Ehrhardt

The advertisement was run repeatedly and later included the "prevention of internal unrest" as one of its purposes. It was mainly former members of the Imperial Navy who reported for the new force. On 17 February 1919 Ehrhardt received the order to assemble it under the name "Second Marine Brigade Wilhelmshaven". The order allowed him to determine the political orientation of the members of his brigade. It was to be a mobile unit and deployed throughout the Reich in the event of insurrections. After 24 March the Marine Brigade Wilhelmshaven was subordinate to the Guard Cavalry Rifle Division.

The brigade initially consisted of four infantry companies with a total of 367 men. In the course of further growth and the formation of new units, it was transferred on 30 March 1919 to Jüterbog south of Berlin and divided into the 3rd and 4th Marine Regiments and a brigade staff. The 3rd Marine Regiment had six infantry companies, the first made up of deck officers, the second of engineer trainees, and the third of NCOs. The other companies were formed from the enlisted ranks. Also attached to the regiment was the Sturm-Kompanie (assault company) which was made up of officers, midshipmen, and cadets. In addition to six infantry companies, the 4th Marine Regiment had a machine gun company, an engineering company, and a battery of 7.7 centimeter field guns.

After its transfer to Munich on 29 April 1919, the Second Marine Brigade Wilhelmshaven had the following organization: brigade staff; Marine Regiment 3 with 1st and 2nd battalions; Marine Regiment 4 with 1st and 2nd battalions; Wilhelmshaven company; assault company; mortar company with two medium and six light mortars; pioneer company; flamethrower platoon; 1st battery with four 7.7 centimeter field guns; and 2nd battery with four light field howitzers and 12 heavy machine guns. The strength of the brigade at the time was about 1,500 men.

== Deployments ==
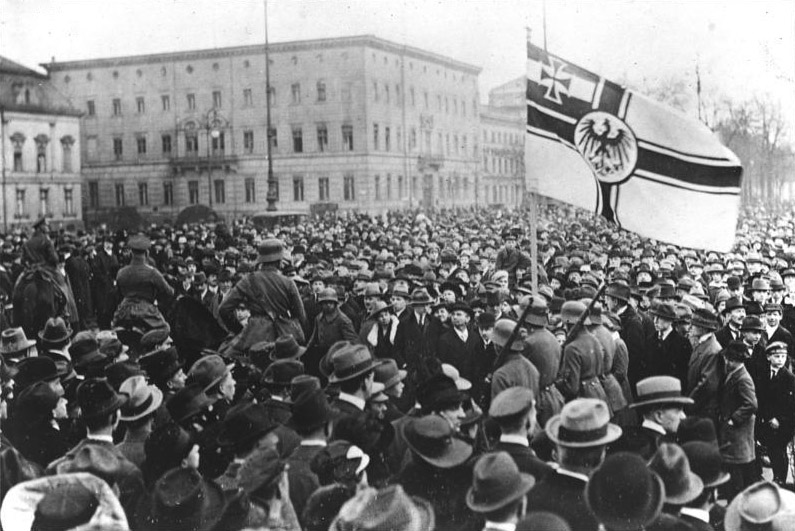
The Marinebrigade Ehrhardt during the Kapp Putsch in 1920

The brigade's first deployment took it to Braunschweig on 17 April 1919, where it joined units of the Maercker Free Corps in preventing the attempt to establish a soviet republic there. After the defeat of the northern communist forces, the brigade marched to the industrial cities of central Germany to fight the local communist uprisings in the region. From there it was transferred to Thuringia, where it was kept ready as part of a large contingent of government units to fight against the Bavarian Soviet Republic. The brigade's advance into Munich without command orders to do so led to fierce street fighting in which the combined government units crushed the workers' uprising. The Freikorps' brutal actions in the street battles, including looting and the mistreatment and shooting of those arrested, illustrated the increasing independence of the Freikorps movement in the fight against revolutionaries. By the summer of 1919, Navy leadership was considering disbanding the Marine Brigade.

In August 1919 it went to Upper Silesia where local free corps, reinforced by groups such as the Marine Brigade, easily repressed the First Silesian Uprising of local Poles against German control of the region.

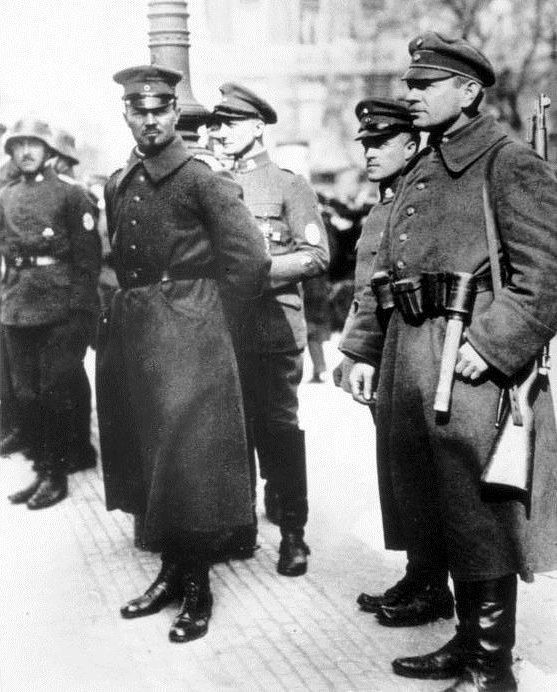
Ehrhardt in Berlin during the Kapp Putsch.

In November the brigade was transferred a camp near Berlin, and in March 1920 the German government issued orders for it to be disbanded. The order was consistent with the Treaty of Versailles, which limited the size of the Republic's army, the Reichswehr, to 100,000 soldiers. The brigade's leaders were determined to resist and appealed to Reichswehr General Walther von Lüttwitz. Lüttwitz, one of the organizers of the Freikorps in 1918 and 1919 and an ardent monarchist, appealed to Reich President Friedrich Ebert and Reich Armed Forces Minister Gustav Noske to stop the disbandment. When Ebert refused, Lüttwitz triggered the Kapp-Lüttwitz Putsch when he marched at the head of the Marine Brigade into Berlin. On the night of 12/13 March 1920, it occupied the government quarter of Berlin with from 2,000 to 6,000 men. It made up only a small fraction of the total free corps forces, which totaled around 30,000 men. The government issued a proclamation calling on Germany's unions to defeat the putsch by means of a general strike. It received massive support, and by 18 March the putsch had failed.

After the coup collapsed, Vice Chancellor Eugen Schiffer built "golden bridges" for Lüttwitz, Ehrhardt and Kapp to persuade them to surrender peacefully. The new Reichswehr leader Hans von Seeckt spoke highly of the brigade's discipline in a daily order issued on 18 March and the next day assured Ehrhardt in writing of protection from arrest. Only then did the brigade march out of Berlin, singing and flying flags as it had when it marched in. When boos were raised from an unfriendly crowd at the Brandenburg Gate, they summarily fired machine guns into the crowd. Twelve dead and thirty seriously wounded were left on the pavement.

The Ehrhardt Brigade was officially disbanded effective 31 May 1920. A large part of it was taken into the German Navy (Reichsmarine) as "reliable cadres"; many of the rest went underground in various organizations including the Union of Former Ehrhardt Officers, the Viking League (Bund Wiking) and the Sport Club Olympia. Ehrhardt brought many from the brigade into the new Organisation Consul, which he led. It used murders and assassinations in its continued fight to overthrow the Weimar government until it was banned in 1922. Ehrhardt fled to Switzerland in 1934 because of the Nazi internal purge known as the Night of the Long Knives. Two years later he went to Austria where he ran the manorial estate near Lichtenau im Waldviertel. He died there in 1971 without having taken part in any further political or military activity.

== Uniform, insignia and standards ==
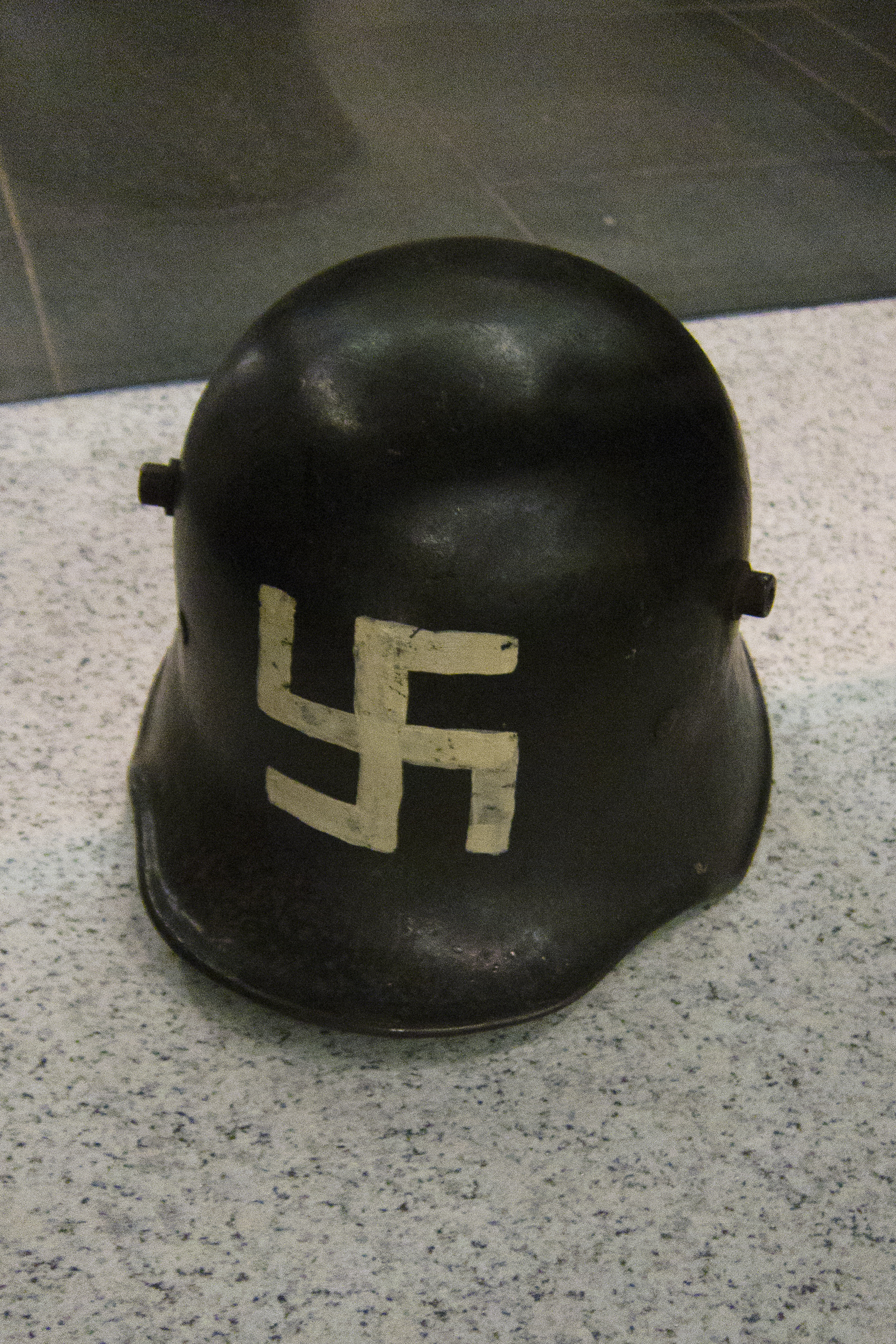
The Marinebrigade Ehrhardt painted Swastikas on their helmet in 1919 before Adolf Hitler seized control of the Deutsche Arbeiterpartei in 1921

Members of the Marine Brigade wore the field gray uniform of the Imperial German Army, although the assault company all had crew uniforms without rank insignia. Attached to the collar of the field blouse was the Guard Star with anchor.

From about February 1919 members of the Marine Brigade wore the badge of the Second Marine Brigade Wilhelmshaven as a special insignia on the left upper arm. The badge was made of silver tinplate and showed, within an egg-shaped rope, a Viking ship sailing with a single man at the helm. At the bottom was an ornamented panel with the inscription "Wilhelmshaven" in fraktur script. Below it were two oak twigs consisting of three leaves with an acorn bound together with ribbons. After the brigade was disbanded, successor organizations continued to use the insignia in a modified form with the inscription "Wilhelmshaven" replaced by "Ehrhardt".

As field insignia, the assault company and each battalion of the Marine Brigade flew the Imperial War Flag (Reichskriegsflagge). From about October 1919 members of the brigade adorned themselves with anti-Semitic markings, such as when they wore swastikas on their helmets returning from operations against the insurgents in Upper Silesia.

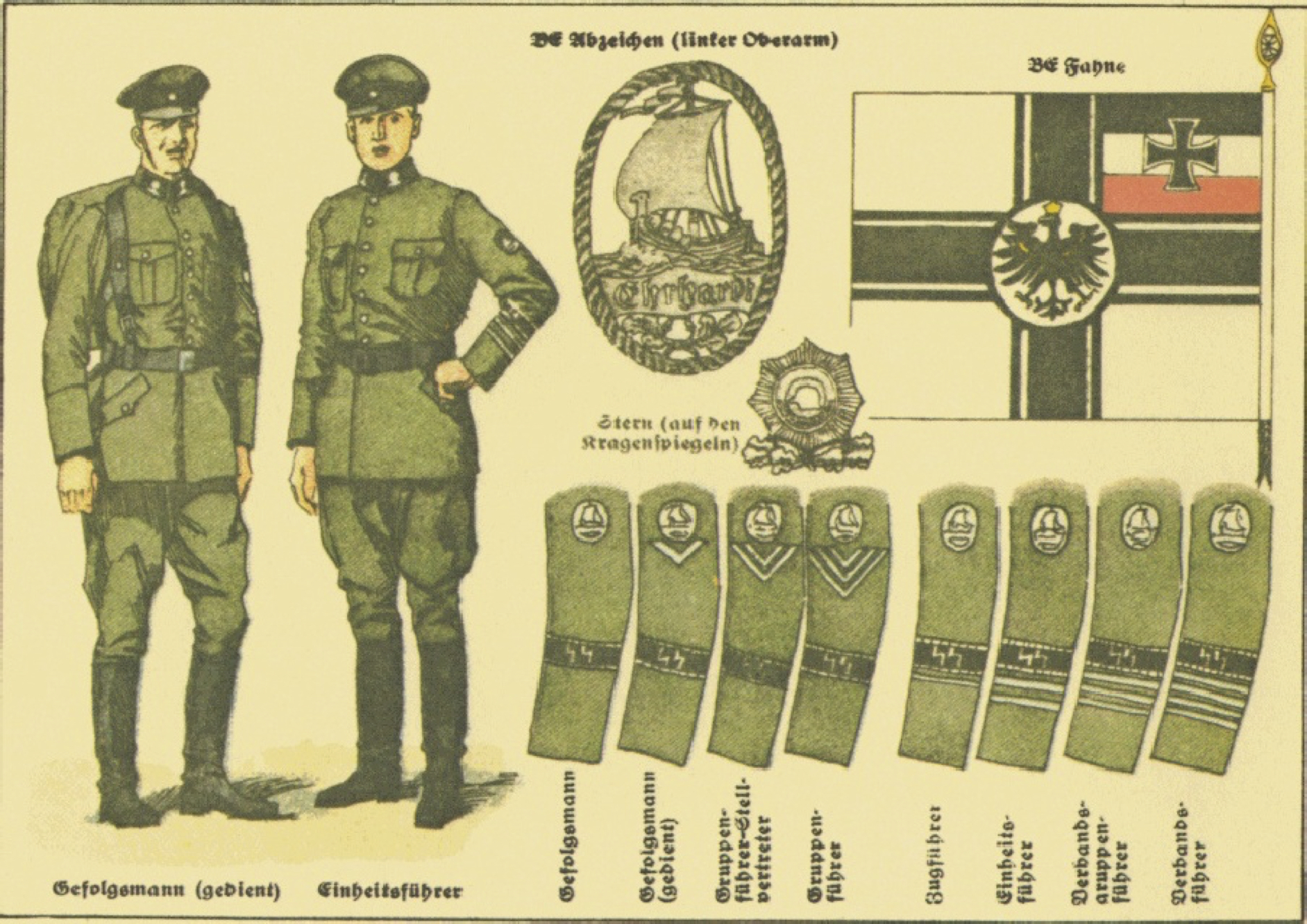
Rank insignia

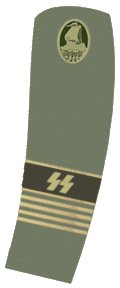
Verbandsführer

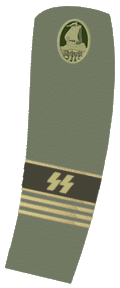
Verbandsgruppenführer

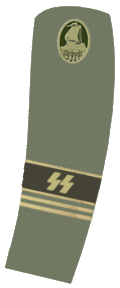
Einheitsführer

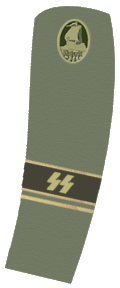
Zugführer
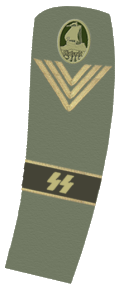
Gruppenführer

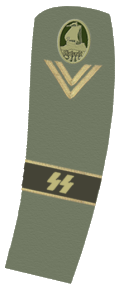
Gruppenführer-Stellvertreter

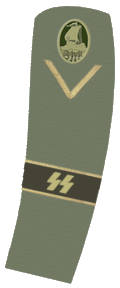
Gefolgsmann (gedient)

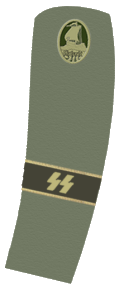
Gefolgsmann

== The Ehrhardt song ==
When the brigade was demobilized in 1920, one of its members composed a song that became known as the Ehrhardt Song. It was sung wherever people wanted to demonstrate a nationalistic and anti-republican stance.

== Notable members ==
- Kurt Blome: Deputy Reich Health Leader under Adolf Hitler
- Horst Böhme: SS officer involved in the Holocaust
- Friedrich Bonte: naval officer involved in the invasion of Norway
- Günther Brandt: anthropologist at the SS Race and Settlement Main Office
- Franz Breithaupt: chief of the SS Court Main Office
- Werner von Fichte: SA-Obergruppenführer and Police President of Erfurt
- Hermann Willibald Fischer: accomplice in the assassination of Walther Rathenau
- Eberhard Godt: commanded German U-boat operations in WWII
- Curt von Gottberg: Higher SS and Police Leader for central Russia and Commissioner-General of occupied Belarus
- Erick-Oskar Hansen: Wehrmacht general
- Hans Albert Hohnfeldt: Gauleiter of the Free City of Danzig
- Dietrich von Jagow: German ambassador to Hungary under the Nazis
- Karl Kaufmann: Reich governor of Hamburg under the Nazis
- Eberhard Kautter: later member of the O.C., co-founder of the Viking League and Ehrhardt's deputy
- Werner Kempf: Wehrmacht general
- Manfred Freiherr von Killinger: mastermind of the assassination of Matthias Erzberger and later Nazi functionary
- Gustav Kleikamp: Vice Admiral in the Nazi Kriegsmarine
- Hans Ulrich Klintzsch: supreme commander of the Sturmabteilung (SA)
- Friedrich-Wilhelm Krüger: Higher SS and Police Leader in German-occupied Poland
- Franz Maria Liedig: member of the military resistance against Adolf Hitler
- Ernst Lucht: admiral in the Kriegsmarine
- Karl Mauss: general who commanded the 7th Panzer Division during WWII
- Karl-Jesko von Puttkamer: admiral and naval adjutant to Hitler
- Ernst von Salomon: novelist and screenwriter involved in the assassination of Walther Rathenau
- Bruno Sattler: SS-Sturmbannführer and head of the Gestapo in Belgrade
- Emanuel Schäfer: SS-Oberführer and protégé of Reinhard Heydrich
- Otto Schniewind: General Admiral in WWII
- Julius Schreck: early senior Nazi official and close confidant of Hitler
- Heinrich Schulz: accomplice in the assassination of Matthias Erzberger
- Hermann Souchon: executed Rosa Luxemburg
- Ernst Werner Techow: took part in the assassination of Walther Rathenau
- Heinrich Tillessen: one of the assassins of Matthias Erzberger

== Literature in English ==
Koster, John (2018). Hermann Ehrhardt, the man Hitler wasn’t. Idle Winter Press. ISBN 9781945687051
