= Kapp Putsch =

1920 failed coup in the Weimar Republic

- Part of political violence in Germany (1918–1933)
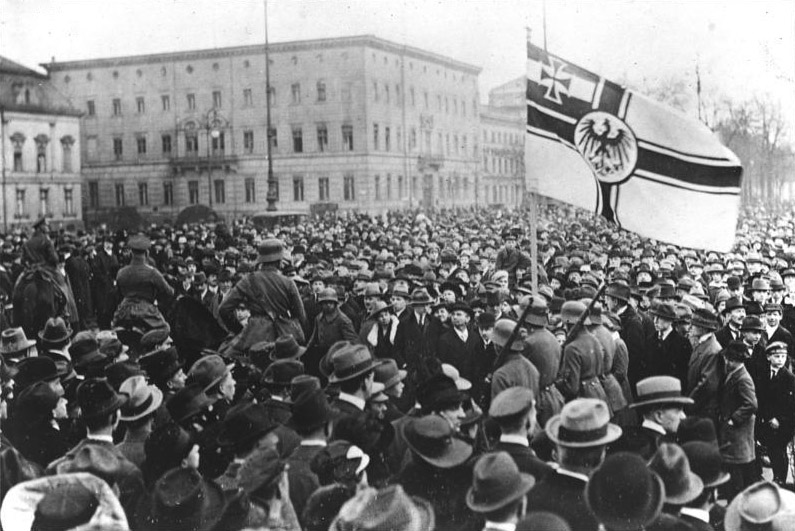
- Marinebrigade Ehrhardt entering Berlin during the Putsch
Date	13–18 March 1920 (5 days)
Location	Weimar Republic
Result	Collapse of the putsch: General strike in opposition of the putsch; Order restored and elections held; Amnesty for putschists; Beginning of the Ruhr uprising

Belligerents
Putschists: Marinebrigade Ehrhardt; Freikorps Roßbach	Weimar Republic: Striking workers

Commanders and leaders
Walther von Lüttwitz; Wolfgang Kapp; Hermann Ehrhardt; Erich Ludendorff; Waldemar Pabst; Traugott von Jagow	Friedrich Ebert; Gustav Bauer; Gustav Noske; Eugen Schiffer

The Kapp Putsch (German pronunciation: [ˈkapˌpʊt͡ʃ]), also known as the Kapp–Lüttwitz Putsch (German pronunciation: [kapˈlʏtvɪt͡sˌpʊt͡ʃ]), was an abortive coup d'état against the German national government in Berlin on 13 March 1920. Named after its leaders Wolfgang Kapp and Walther von Lüttwitz, its goal was to undo the German Revolution of 1918–1919, overthrow the Weimar Republic, and establish an autocratic government. It was supported by parts of the Reichswehr, as well as nationalist and monarchist factions.

Although the legitimate German government was forced to flee the city, the coup failed after a few days, when large sections of the German population joined a general strike called by the government. Most civil servants refused to cooperate with Kapp and his allies. Despite its failure, the Putsch had significant consequences for the future of the Weimar Republic. It was also one of the direct causes of the Ruhr uprising a few weeks later, which the government suppressed by military force, after having dealt leniently with leaders of the Kapp Putsch. These events polarised the German electorate, resulting in a shift in the majority after the June 1920 Reichstag election.

== Background ==
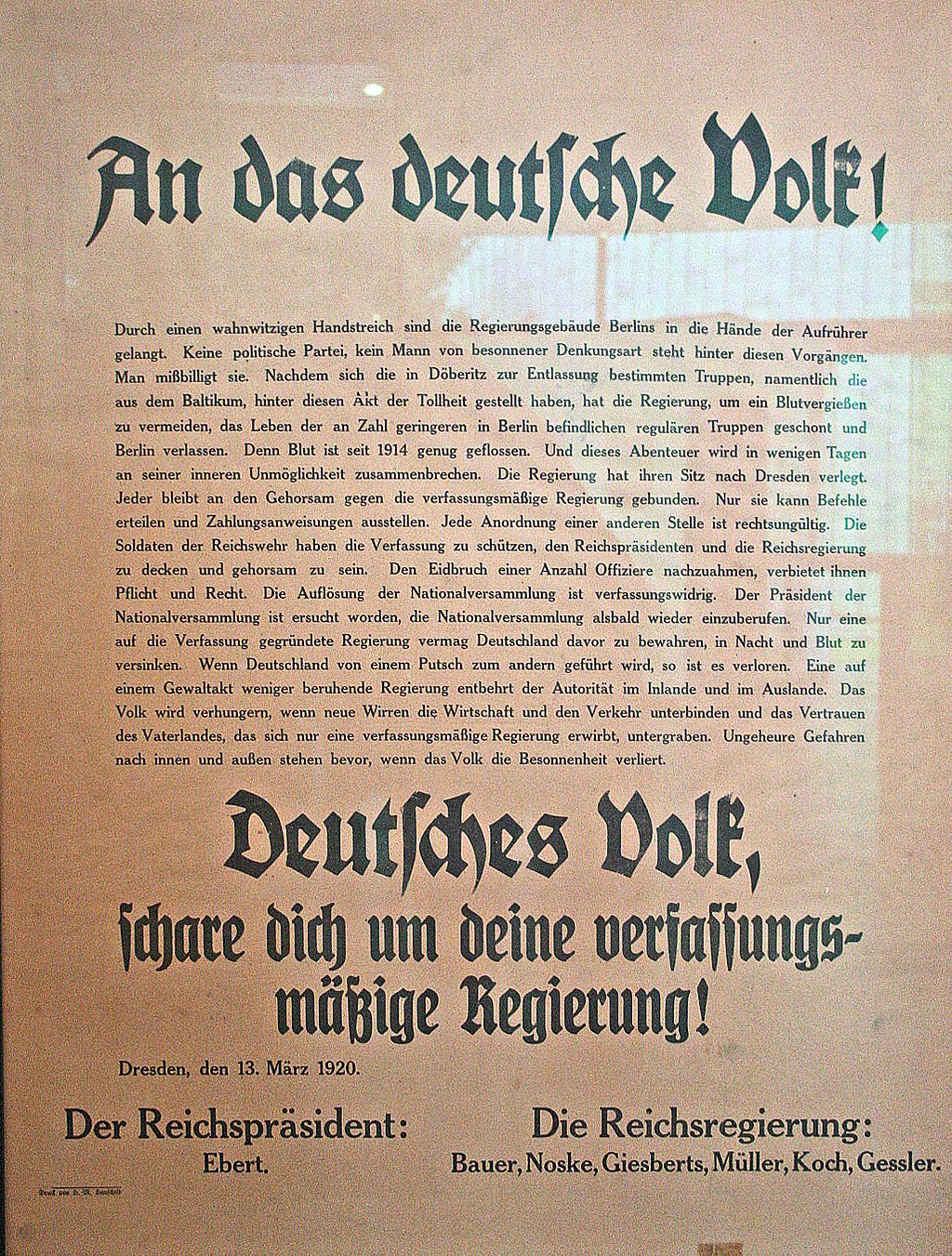
Government poster written against the Kapp Putsch, 13 March 1920. (Note: Translation of the poster's text: To the German people! As a result of a lunatic coup de main, the government buildings of Berlin have fallen into the hands of mutineers. No political party, no man of sober-minded thought, is behind these events. They are to be deplored. Since troops that are destined for discharge in Döberitz, namely [troops] from the Baltic, have supported this act of madness, the government — in order to avoid the spilling of blood — has spared the lives of the few regular troops located in Berlin and has departed Berlin. For enough blood has flowed since 1914. And this adventure will collapse in a few days from its intrinsic impracticality. The government has transferred its seat to Dresden. Everyone remains bound in obedience to the constitutional government. Only it can issue orders and payments. Any decree from another place is legally null. The soldiers of the national army have to defend the constitution, protect the president and government, and be obedient. To emulate the breaking of their oath by a number of officers is prohibited by duty and law. The dissolution of the national assembly is unconstitutional. The President of the National Assembly has been requested to convene the National Assembly again at once. Only a government based on the Constitution can save Germany from sinking into darkness and blood. If Germany is led from one coup to another, then it is lost. A government resting on an act of violence lacks authority domestically and abroad. The people will starve if new troubles interrupt the economy and commerce and undermine the trust of the father land, which only a constitutional government earns. Colossal dangers loom internally and externally if the people lose their prudence. German people, rally to your constitutional government! Dresden, 13th of March 1920 National president: Ebert National government: Bauer, Noske, Giesberts, Müller, Koch, Gessler)

After Germany had lost World War I (1914–1918), the German Revolution of 1918–1919 ended the monarchy. The German Empire was abolished and a democratic system, the Weimar Republic, was established in 1919 by the Weimar National Assembly. Right-wing nationalist and militarist circles opposed the new republic and promoted the stab-in-the-back myth, claiming that the war had been lost only because the efforts of the undefeated German military had been undermined by civilians at home.

In 1919–1920, the government of Germany was formed by the Weimar Coalition, consisting of the Social Democratic Party (SPD), German Democratic Party (DDP, left-of-centre liberals), and Zentrum (Catholics). President Friedrich Ebert, Chancellor Gustav Bauer, and Defence Minister Gustav Noske were all members of the SPD. According to the constitution, the president was the commander-in-chief of the armed forces, represented in peace time by the Minister of Defence. The most senior officer of the land forces was called Chef der Heeresleitung, a post held in early 1920 by General Walther Reinhardt.

Chancellor Bauer was obliged to sign the Treaty of Versailles in 1919, even though he disagreed with it. The treaty had been dictated by the victorious Allies of World War I; it forced Germany to assume responsibility for the war, reduced the area of Germany and imposed huge reparation payments and military restrictions on the nation. In early 1919, the strength of the Reichswehr, the regular German army, was estimated at 350,000, with more than 250,000 men enlisted in the various Freikorps ("free corps"), volunteer paramilitary units, largely consisting of soldiers returning from the war. The German government had repeatedly used Freikorps troops to put down Communist uprisings after the war. Under the terms of the Treaty of Versailles, which came into effect on 10 January 1920, Germany was required to reduce its land forces to a maximum of 100,000 men, who were to be only professional soldiers, not conscripts. The initial deadline was set for 31 March 1920 (later extended to the end of the year). Freikorps units were expected to be disbanded. After the suppression of the leftist uprisings, the government had no further need for the Freikorps units and came to see them as a threat. Some senior military commanders had started discussing the possibility of a coup as early as July 1919.

== Coup ==
=== Run-up to the coup ===
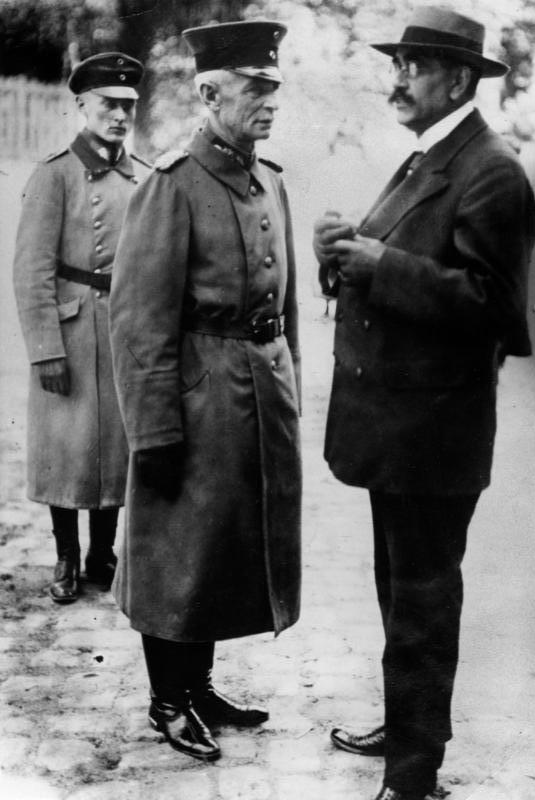
Walther von Lüttwitz (centre) and Gustav Noske (right), c. 1920

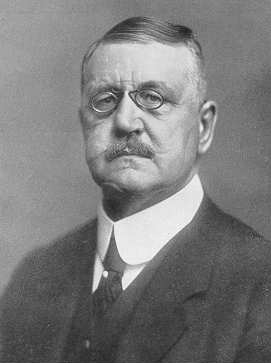
Wolfgang Kapp, the leader of the Putsch

Although the Putsch has been named after Wolfgang Kapp, a 62-year-old nationalist East Prussian civil servant, who had been planning a coup against the republic for a while, it was instigated by the military; Kapp played a supporting role. On 29 February 1920, the Defence Minister Noske ordered the disbandment of two of the most powerful Freikorps, the Marinebrigade Loewenfeld and Marinebrigade Ehrhardt. The latter numbered from 5,000 to 6,000 men and had been stationed at the Truppenübungsplatz Döberitz, near Berlin, since January 1920. An elite force, it had been created from former Imperial Navy officers and NCOs, boosted later by Baltikumer (those who had fought the Bolsheviks in Latvia in 1919). During the civil war in 1919, the brigade had seen action in Munich and Berlin. It was extremely opposed to the democratic government of Friedrich Ebert.

Its commander, Korvettenkapitän Hermann Ehrhardt, declared that the unit would refuse its dissolution. On 1 March, it staged a parade without inviting Noske. General Walther von Lüttwitz, in command of all the regular troops in and around Berlin (Gruppenkommando I), the highest ranking general in the army at the time and in command of many Freikorps, said at the parade that he would "not accept" the loss of such an important unit. Several of Lüttwitz's officers were horrified at this open rejection of the government's authority and tried to mediate by setting up a meeting between Lüttwitz and the leaders of the two major right-wing parties. Lüttwitz listened to and remembered their ideas but was not dissuaded from his course of action. Noske then removed the Marinebrigade from Lüttwitz's command and assigned it to the leadership of the Navy, hoping that they would disband the unit. Lüttwitz ignored the order but agreed to a meeting with President Ebert, suggested by his staff.

In the evening of 10 March, Lüttwitz came with his staff to Ebert's office. Ebert had also asked Noske to attend. Lüttwitz, drawing on demands by the right-wing parties and adding his own, now demanded the immediate dissolution of the National Assembly, new elections for the Reichstag, the appointment of technocrats (Fachminister) as Secretaries for Foreign Affairs, Economic Affairs and Finance, the dismissal of General Reinhardt, appointment of himself as supreme commander of the regular army and the revocation of the orders of dissolution for the Marinebrigaden. Ebert and Noske rejected these demands and Noske told Lüttwitz that he expected his resignation the next day.

Lüttwitz went to Döberitz on 11 March and asked Ehrhardt whether he would be able to occupy Berlin that evening. Ehrhardt said he needed another day, but on the morning of 13 March, he could be in the centre of Berlin with his men. Lüttwitz gave the order and Ehrhardt began the preparations. It was only at this point that Lüttwitz brought the group known as Nationale Vereinigung into the plot. These included German National People's Party (DNVP) member Wolfgang Kapp, retired general Erich Ludendorff, Waldemar Pabst (who had been behind the murder of Karl Liebknecht and Rosa Luxemburg in January 1919), and Traugott von Jagow, the last Berlin head of police in the old Reich. Their goal was to establish an authoritarian regime (though not a monarchy) with a return to the federal structure of the Empire. Lüttwitz asked them to be ready to take over the government on 13 March. The group was unprepared but agreed to the schedule set by Lüttwitz. One factor making them support quick action was that sympathetic members of the Sicherheitspolizei in Berlin informed them that warrants for their arrest had been issued that day.

Lüttwitz was not dismissed but suspended from his post on 11 March. To defend the government, Noske ordered two regiments of Sicherheitspolizei and one regular regiment to take position in the government quarter but doubted that a Putsch was imminent. The regimental commanders decided not to follow orders to shoot, a decision that received the approval of Chef des Truppenamts General Hans von Seeckt.

=== Occupation of Berlin ===
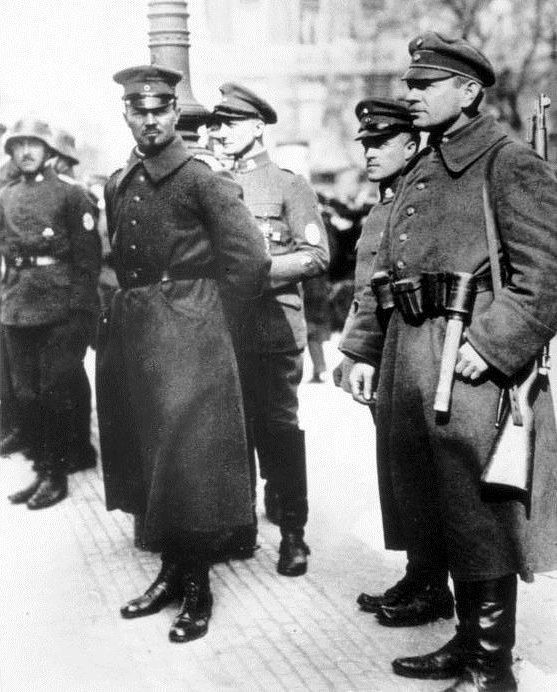
Hermann Ehrhardt during the Putsch

The reluctance to shed blood was one-sided. On the evening of 12 March, Ehrhardt ordered his brigade to march into Berlin, to "ruthlessly break any resistance" (jeden Widerstand rücksichtslos zu brechen) and to occupy the centre of the city with the government buildings. The Brigade, sporting swastikas on their helmets and vehicles, started off towards Berlin at around 22:00. An hour later, the Gruppenkommando knew about it and informed Noske. Two general officers met Ehrhardt and convinced him to give the government a chance to surrender before being taken into custody, assuming that all of Lüttwitz's demands were accepted by 07:00. This was reported to Noske, who met with Ebert. Ebert then called a cabinet meeting for 04:00. At 01:00, Noske asked the senior commanders to his office in the Bendlerblock.

Noske asked the commanders to defend the government buildings, but was turned down. All but two of the officers (one of them was Reinhardt, Chef der Heeresleitung) refused to follow an order to shoot at the rebel troops. Some suggested negotiations, others claimed that the troops would not understand an order to fire, and some argued that the regular units would not be able to defeat the elite Marinebrigade. Seeckt spoke about comradeship. His exact words were not recorded, but have been reported as: "troops do not fire on troops. So, you perhaps intend, Herr Minister, that a battle be fought before the Brandenburger Tor between troops that have fought side by side against a common enemy? When Reichswehr fires on Reichswehr, all comradeship within the officers' corps will have vanished". Others have quoted Seeckt's words as even more succinct: "Reichswehr does not fire on Reichswehr!"

Noske, depressed enough by the disloyalty of the military to speak about suicide to an aide, reported to the cabinet at 04:00. At a confused meeting at the Reichskanzlei, the undefended cabinet took two decisions: to flee the city and to issue a call for a general strike. These were not unanimous; the Vice-Chancellor Eugen Schiffer and some of the other non-SPD ministers refused to leave the city, to preserve the opportunity to negotiate with the putschists. Only Ebert and the SPD ministers signed the call for a general strike. At 06:15, they had to interrupt the meeting and flee. Within ten minutes of their departure, the Marinebrigade reached the Brandenburger Tor, where it was met by Lüttwitz, Ludendorff, Kapp and their followers. Shortly thereafter, Kapp's men moved into the Reichskanzlei. Supported by a battalion of regular Reichswehr, they occupied the government quarter.

Kapp declared himself Chancellor (Reichskanzler) and formed a provisional government. Lüttwitz served as commander of the armed forces and Minister of Defence. Several well-known conservatives and former secretaries of state were invited to assume government positions but declined. International con-man Ignaz Trebitsch-Lincoln became Kapp's press censor.

=== Reactions ===
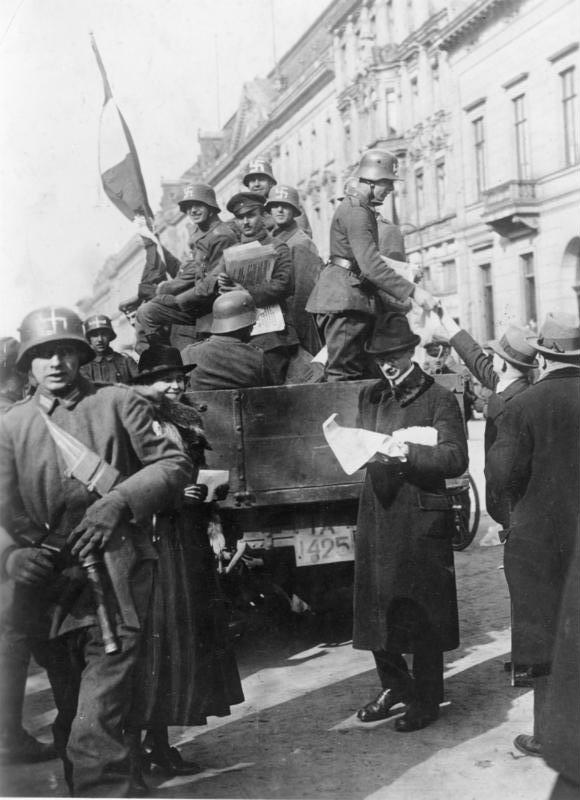
Members of the Marinebrigade Ehrhardt, with swastikas on their helmets, distributing leaflets on 13 March

There was no military resistance to the Putsch; the regular troops in Berlin, Sicherheitspolizei, navy, the army commands of East-Prussia, Pomerania, Brandenburg and Silesia, formally accepted the new minister of defence and Reichskanzler. Admiral Adolf von Trotha, the navy commander, came out in support of the coup as soon as he learned of it. In Bavaria, the Social Democratic state government resigned after refusing to install an emergency regime as demanded by Reichswehr General Arnold von Möhl, Georg Escherich and Gustav Ritter von Kahr. The Bavarian Parliament then elected Kahr, a right-wing politician associated with the Bavarian People's Party, as Minister President of Bavaria. In the rest of the Reich, the commanders of the Wehrkreise (military districts) did not declare for or against Kapp but were not neutral and most sympathised more or less openly with the putschists. The upper echelons of the bureaucracy were still dominated by those who had risen to their positions under the Empire and most were sympathetic to the coup, whilst remaining outwardly neutral and biding their time. In the eastern provinces, the bureaucracy fell in line behind Kapp and Lüttwitz.

==== General Strike against the coup ====
The government moved to Dresden, where they hoped to get support from Generalmajor Georg Ludwig Rudolf Maercker but he had been ordered by Berlin to take them into "protective custody" and they moved on to Stuttgart. The cabinet proclamation on 13 March, calling on German workers to defeat the Putsch by means of a general strike met with enormous success and received massive support from the working class. The majority of unions, sympathetic to the government dominated by social democrats, joined the call for a strike on the same day, as did the Independent Social Democratic Party (USPD) and the Democratic Party; the Communist Party of Germany (KPD) followed one day later.

In Berlin, the strike started on 14 March and by the next day it had spread all over the Reich. It was the most powerful strike in the history of Germany, involving up to 12 million workers. The country was paralysed. In Berlin, the gas, water and power supply stopped.

Adolf Hitler, who had been in contact with the members of the Nationale Vereinigung and was eager to help the coup along, was flown into Berlin from Munich by the Army. The pilot was Robert von Greim, whom Hitler later appointed as the last commander of the Luftwaffe. He was met by striking workers at an airfield outside of Berlin, where he landed by mistake, and had to disguise himself. Eventually Hitler was able to continue his flight together with Dietrich Eckart to Berlin, where they immediately went to the Reichskanzlei to meet Wolfgang Kapp. Hitler and Eckart were approached by Ignaz Trebitsch-Lincoln, who told them that Kapp had fled and the coup had failed.

=== Collapse ===
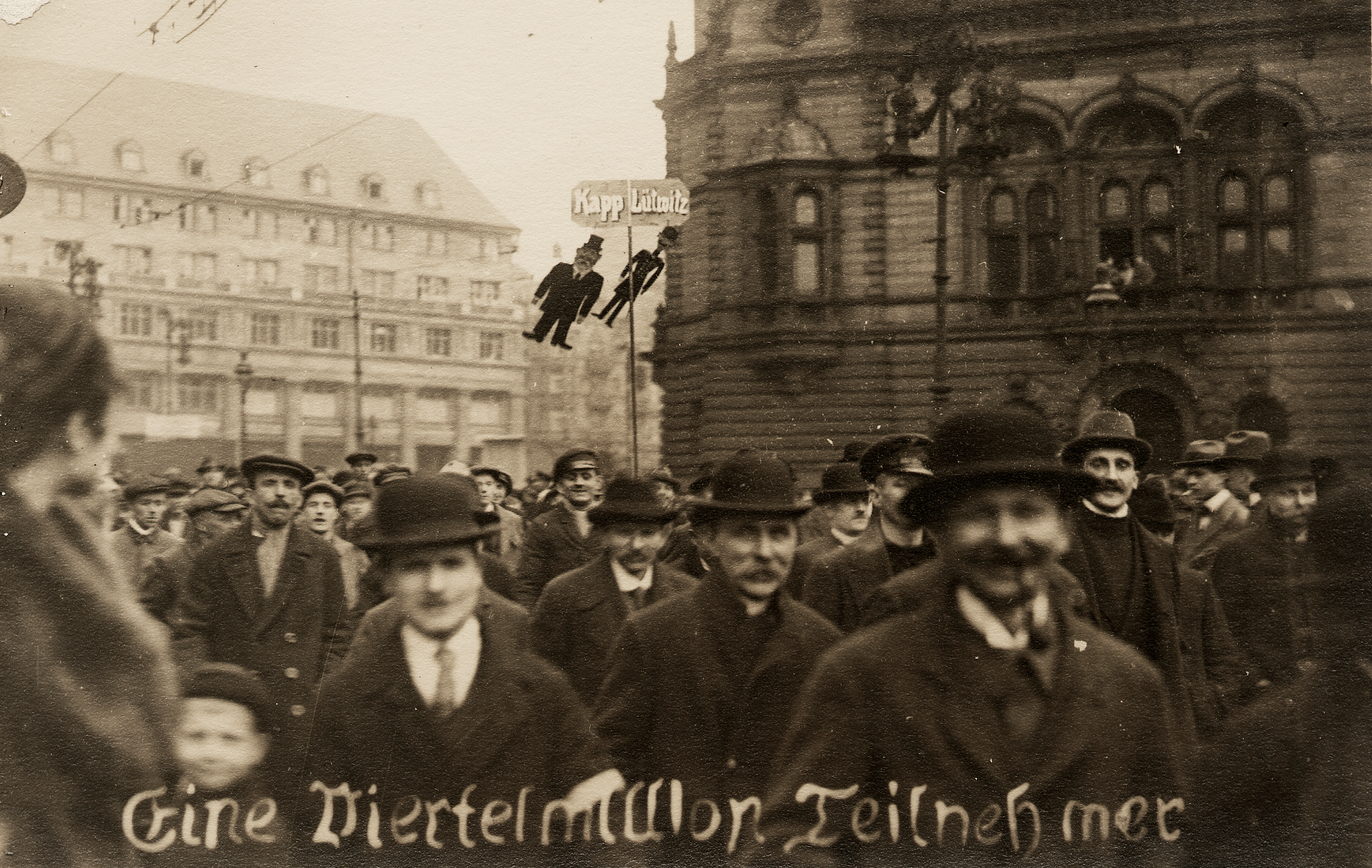
Demonstration in Berlin against the putsch. The caption reads: "A quarter million participants"

With the country paralysed, Kapp and Lüttwitz were unable to govern; in Berlin, communication between military units was by courier only. The rank and file of the bureaucracy were on strike, and there were no newspapers. Proclamations asking the workers to return to their jobs, promises of new elections and even the threat of capital punishment for strikers remained without results and the Putsch collapsed on 17 March, four days after it had begun. Kapp had put Vice-Chancellor Schiffer and the members of the Prussian state government into protective custody on 13 March but they were released the next day and on 15 March, negotiations began. Representatives of the democratic right, Oskar Hergt and Gustav Stresemann also participated. The four big centre-right parties (Democratic Party, Zentrum, German People's Party and German National People's Party) agreed that the main threat was now "bolshevism" and that they had to "win back" the officer corps. It was considered undesirable that Kapp and Lüttwitz should be toppled; they must be seen to resign voluntarily.

The four parties, supported by some Social Democrats who had remained in Berlin, offered fresh elections, a cabinet reshuffle and an amnesty for all participants in the Putsch, if Kapp and Lüttwitz were to resign. The putschists offered only the resignation of Kapp, and Lüttwitz tried to hold on for another day as head of a military dictatorship, but his commanders deserted him. They suggested to Schiffer, in the absence of Ebert, in charge of the government's affairs, that he appoint Seeckt as head of the Reichswehr, which Schiffer did in the name of Ebert. When Lüttwitz offered his resignation on 18 March, Schiffer accepted — again in Ebert's name — while granting him full pension rights. Schiffer also suggested Pabst and Lüttwitz should leave the country, until the National Assembly had decided on the question of an amnesty and even offered them false passports and money.

On 18 March, Seeckt praised the discipline of the Marinebrigade Ehrhardt and the next day provided Ehrhardt with a written promise that he would not be arrested as long as he was in command of the brigade and the brigade left Berlin. When they were heckled by an unfriendly crowd of bystanders, they opened fire with machine guns, leaving twelve civilians dead and thirty severely wounded. Kapp remained in the country and only fled to Sweden in April. Lüttwitz first went to Saxony and only later left for Hungary. Both men used passports provided by supporters in the police. Ehrhardt went into hiding in Bavaria.

== Violence outside Berlin ==
=== Hamburg ===
Since 1 January, Rudolf Berthold's Iron Troop Freikorps had been returning to Germany from Lithuania. Their eventual destination was Zossen, where they would disarm. By 13 March, they had gotten as far as Stade. There, they discovered the insurrection was in progress. Baulked from boarding a train there by striking rail workers, Berthold had his men occupy the train station, city hall, telegraph office and post office. He then bedded his troops for the night in the local girls' high school. The following day, the Iron Troop commandeered a train, which crept along unsafe tracks into Harburg, Hamburg. Before the Iron Troop's arrival, Independent Socialist city officials had quietly arrested the commanding officer of the local Reichswehr battalion, leaving the soldiers leaderless. Upon the train's arrival, the officials directed the Freikorps to the local middle school for shelter.

On the following morning, 15 March 1920, a citizen militia began to coalesce around the school. At about noon, a Freikorps machine-gunner fired a burst over the gathering crowd to disperse them. A firefight ensued, with 13 civilian casualties. Three Iron Troop soldiers were also killed, and eight others captured and executed. With neither police nor Reichswehr troops to restrain the gathering militia, and little ammunition among his troops, Berthold realised he had to negotiate a surrender. He agreed to let his unarmed men exit the school at 18:00 upon assurance that the militia would not harm them. During this surrender, an enraged crowd of onlookers mobbed the Iron Troop, and Berthold was murdered. The disarmed Iron Troop was taken to a nearby military base.

=== Mecklenburg-Schwerin ===
When the news of the putsch reached Schwerin, the capital of Mecklenburg-Schwerin, the labour unions and workers' parties called for a general strike and occupied key buildings in the city. At meetings in Rostock and Wismar, workers decided to take up arms against the putsch. Generalmajor Paul von Lettow-Vorbeck, the Reichswehr brigade commander at Schwerin, put himself under Lüttwitz's command and called on the Freikorps Rossbach for support. On 15 March, they opened fire on the workers occupying the Schwerin post office. The fighting left 14 workers and two soldiers dead.

At the Güstrow market square on 17 March, nine people were killed in fighting between workers and soldiers who supported the putsch. The Freikorps Rossbach occupied Wismar on 19 March, after the putsch in Berlin had ended. Six workers were killed when firing broke out between them and the Freikorps troops; a seventh worker was taken prisoner and murdered. Across Mecklenburg-Schwerin, 91 people died in the violence that accompanied the Kapp Putsch.

== Aftermath ==
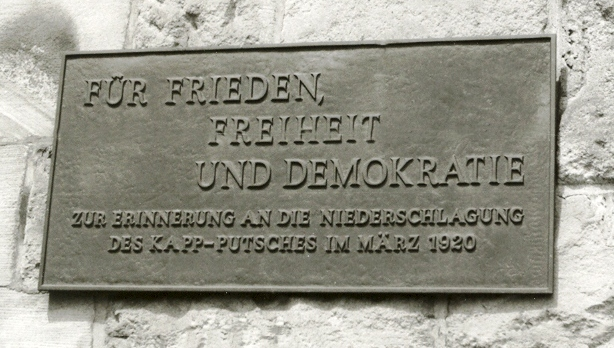
Memorial for the suppression of the Kapp putsch, railway station of Wetter. The sign reads: "For peace, freedom and democracy — in memory of the suppression of the Kapp putsch in March 1920"

=== Weimar politics ===
In 2009, Layton wrote, "At first sight, the collapse of the Kapp Putsch could be viewed as a major success for the Weimar Republic. In the six days of crisis, it had retained the backing of the people of Berlin and had effectively withstood a major threat from the extreme right." Among the grievances which Kapp and his followers had against the government were that the National Assembly, which had been elected to serve temporarily, was beginning to act as a permanent Reichstag and that it seemed this assembly might revise the constitution with respect to the election of the president of the Republic, which would make the Reichstag, rather than the electorate, responsible for the presidential election. As a consequence of the political crisis that the putsch caused, the date of the general election for the first republican Reichstag was brought forward to 6 June. All attempts to change the method of election for the presidency of the Republic were abandoned. In the Reichstag elections of 6 June, the number of votes cast for the SPD and the Democratic Party fell by more than half compared to the January 1919 elections, while the right-wing German National People's Party (DNVP) (some of whose voters eventually switched to the Nazis) and the left-wing USPD gained substantially. The Weimar Coalition lost its majority in parliament and would never regain it.

=== Ruhr uprising ===
The effects of the Kapp-Lüttwitz Putsch throughout Germany were more lasting than in Berlin. In some parts of the country, the strike turned into an armed revolt. The violence came from local military commanders who supported the new government and arrested pickets, which the workers resisted. In Thuringia and Saxony, the military defeated the workers after bloody fights. In the Ruhr, the workers continued their protests after the Putsch in Berlin had collapsed. In the Ruhr uprising, the Red Ruhr Army of about 50,000 workers went on the offensive with the goal of overthrowing the Weimar Republic and replacing it with a Soviet-style council republic. On 17 March it took Dortmund, on 18 March Hamm and Bochum and on 19 March Essen, causing the local commander of the military district at Münster to order a withdrawal. By 22 March, the Ruhr was under the control of the revolutionary workers.

The legitimate government returned to Berlin on 20 March and demanded an end to the general strike. It offered some concessions to the unions, some of them made in bad faith. The unions (ADGB, Afa-Bund and DBB) demanded the creation of a new government made up of SPD and USPD led by Carl Legien, but only a new government based on the Weimar Coalition found a majority in the National Assembly. Hermann Müller (SPD) replaced Bauer as chancellor. The government then tried to negotiate with workers who refused to lay down their arms after the unions called off the strike on 22 March. When the negotiations failed, the revolt in the Ruhr was suppressed by the Reichswehr and Freikorps units in early April 1920. Over 1,000 workers were killed, many in summary executions, some committed by units that had been involved in the Putsch, including the Marinebrigade Loewenfeld. Another 600 Reichswehr and Freikorps soldiers also lost their lives. As in 1918–1919, those on the left had cause to accuse the SPD and the Ebert government of siding with the enemies of the workers and of the republic.

=== Putsch perpetrators ===
The Putsch left a rump of military conspirators such as Pabst and Ehrhardt, who found refuge in Bavaria under the right-wing government of Gustav von Kahr (itself an indirect product of the Kapp-Lüttwitz Putsch) and there attempted to organise plots against the republican constitution and government of Germany. The crisis in the relations of Bavaria with the Reich (August–September 1921), which ended in Kahr's resignation, was a further phase of the same trouble.

After the Putsch, Noske named Kapp, Pabst and Ehrhardt as being responsible, despite the support from much higher up in the army. Most of the participants were granted an amnesty and on 2 August 1920, the Reichstag passed a law that exculpated crimes committed during the Putsch and the subsequent Ruhr Uprising except those due to "cruelty" or "self-interest". Of 705 cases brought against civilians, only the prosecution of von Jagow ended with a guilty verdict. Freikorps and Reichswehr members were subject to military law and of 775 courts-martial, 486 cases were closed. 48 officers were removed from their posts, six resigned, and the others were subject to mild disciplinary actions. The Marinebrigade Ehrhardt was dissolved in May 1920, but most of its members were allowed to join the Reichswehr, where they had successful careers. The courts were much harsher on the members of the Red Ruhr Army, many of whom were sentenced to lengthy terms of imprisonment.

Kapp was arrested in Sweden on 16 April but not deported to Germany. He voluntarily returned to Germany in April 1922 and died the same year in prison while awaiting trial. Lüttwitz returned to Germany as part of an amnesty in 1924. Gustav Noske was forced to resign by the unions on 22 March, as a condition for ending the general strike and because some in the SPD thought that he had not been tough enough facing up to the putschists; Otto Gessler succeeded Noske as Defence Minister. General Reinhardt also resigned out of protest at Noske's dismissal. General Seeckt became his successor as Chef der Heeresleitung.

Former Ottoman grand vizier Talat Pasha, the main perpetrator of the Armenian genocide, was hiding in Berlin after the war and appeared at the press conference to criticize the putschists for dilettantism.

=== Monument to the March Dead ===
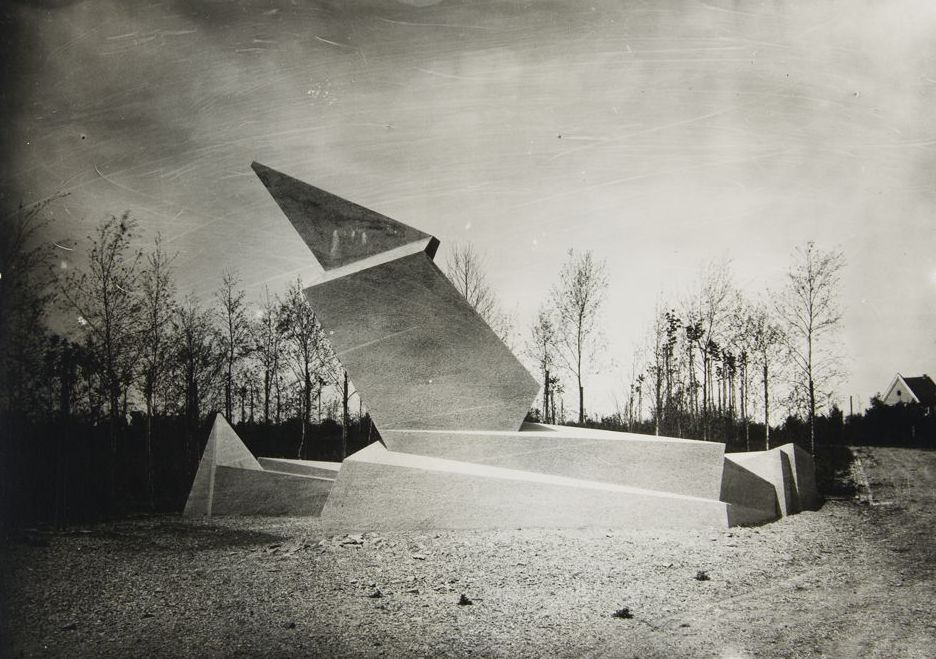
Monument to the March Dead, by Walter Gropius

Between 1920 and 1922, a monument in honour of the workers who were killed in the wake of the Kapp Putsch was erected in the Weimar central cemetery. The memorial was commissioned by the Weimar Gewerkschaftskartell (Union Cartel), which conducted a competition to select a design. It was built according to plans submitted by the architectural office of Walter Gropius. Although Gropius had said that the Bauhaus should remain politically neutral, he agreed to participate in the competition of Weimar artists at the end of 1920.

The monument was arranged around an inner space, in which visitors could stand. The repeatedly fractured and highly angular memorial rose on three sides, as if thrust up from or rammed into the earth.

The monument was destroyed by the Nazis in February 1936. They objected to it politically and considered it an example of "degenerate art", as Hitler characterised modern works.

== See also ==
- 1920 in Germany
- Rudolph Berthold § Death and gravestone
- Beer Hall Putsch
- Civilian-based defense
- German Revolution
- Kornilov Affair
- Spartacist Uprising

== Bibliography ==
- Erger, Johannes (1967). Der Kapp-Lüttwitz-Putsch: Ein Beitrag zur deutschen Innenpolitik 1919–1920. Beiträge zur Geschichte des Parlamentarismus und der politischen Parteien (in German). Vol. 35. Droste.
- Kilduff, Peter (2012). Iron Man Rudolf Berthold: Germany's Indomitable Fighter Ace of World War I. Grub Street Journal. ISBN 978-1-908117-37-3.
- Könnemann, Erwin; Schulze, Gerhard (2002). Der Kapp-Lüttwitz-Ludendorff-Putsch. Dokumente (in German). Olzog. ISBN 3789293555.
- McElligott, Anthony (2009). Weimar Germany. Oxford University Press.
