= Rudolf Creutz =

Austrian Nazi official and war criminal (1896–1980)

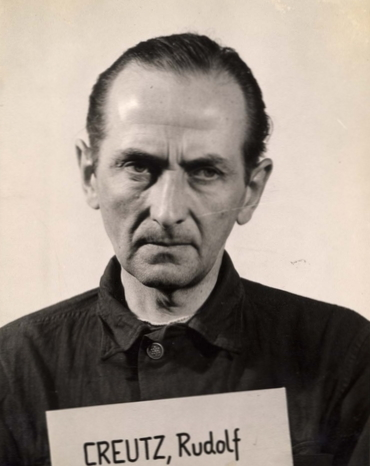
- Creutz in U.S. custody in 1946
- Born: 6 April 1896; Trieste, Austria-Hungary
- Died: 8 July 1980 (aged 84); Vienna, Austria
- Political party: Nazi Party
- Status: Deceased
- Motive: Nazism
- Convictions: Crimes against humanity War crimes Membership in a criminal organization
- Trial: RuSHA trial
- Penalty: 15 years imprisonment; commuted to 10 years imprisonment
- SS career
- Allegiance: Germany
- Branch: Schutzstaffel

Rudolf Creutz (6 April 1896 – 8 July 1980) was an Austrian Nazi and a high-ranking member of the SS during World War II. He was involved in the implementation of racial resettlement programs in the Occupied Territories and was convicted of war crimes by the Allies in 1948. He was sentenced to 15 years in prison, which was commuted to 10 years in 1951, and he was released the same year.

== Life ==
Rudolf Creutz was born in the city of Trieste on 6 April 1896, when it was part of Austria-Hungary. He married the Countess Marie Margarethe Christiane Rességuier von Miremont and the couple had one son. Creutz became a member of the Nazi party (member no. 2,367,675) and the SS (member no. 77,813), reaching the rank of SS-Brigadeführer on 9 November 1943.

Creutz became a deputy of Ulrich Greifelt, an SS Major General and Chief of Staff of the Reichskommissariat for the Consolidation of German Nationhood (German: Reichskommissariat für die Festigung des deutschen Volkstums) or RKFDV. This was an SS organization tasked with Hitler's Heim ins Reich and Germanization initiatives during World War II. The RKFDV's responsibilities were the "final return of ethnic Germans to the Reich," the "elimination of harmful influences," and "the design of new German settlement areas by trans-location". Creutz was head of RKFDV Office A which operated the "Wiedereindeutschungs" program, whereby orphans in occupied territories were selected according to their "racial appearance" and forcibly removed to Germany to be adopted by "Nordic parents". These children were orphans primarily because their parents had already been sent to concentration camps.

As early as 1941, Creutz was involved in the deportation and resettlement of German families from Lorraine and Luxembourg to Germany, in order to protect them from "undesirable influences" in those areas. He issued detailed instructions on the procedures to be followed and provided progress reports directly to Heinrich Himmler. In 1942, Creutz issued these orders to Reich Governors: "There are a great number of children in former Polish orphanages who, on account of their racial characteristics, must be considered to be children of Nordic parents. These children must be subjected to a racial and psychological selection procedure. Children found to be biologically valuable for the German Reich are to be Germanized." By 1943 these programs had expanded to include the outright abduction of both children and adults. In an eight-page report to Himmler, dated 25 March 1943, Creutz outlined the operations and gave details as to the measures he had ordered: "The selection of persons is to be made by the branch office of the SS Race and Settlement Main Office (RuSHA) in Litzmannstadt (Łódź). Persons found suitable for being Germanized are to be turned over to the individual Higher SS and Police Leaders in Germany proper."

Creutz was arrested by the Allies at the end of World War II. In 1947 he was a defendant in the RuSHA Trial, the eighth trial of the Subsequent Nuremberg Trials. He was charged with crimes against humanity, war crimes and membership of a criminal organization (the SS). On 10 March 1948 he was convicted on the following counts: the kidnapping of alien children, in particular from France, Luxembourg, and Poland; the forced evacuation and resettlement of populations; the forced Germanization of enemy nationals; and the utilization of foreign nationals as slave labor. He was sentenced to 15 years in Landsberg Prison.

Creutz's sentence was reduced to 10 years in 1951, and he was released from prison later that year. He died on 8 July 1980 in Vienna, Austria.

== See also ==
- Hauptamt Volksdeutsche Mittelstelle
- Volksdeutsche
