= Inge Viermetz =

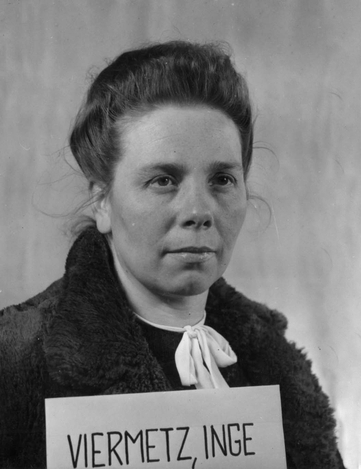
- Viermetz in Allied internment
- Born: March 7, 1908; Aschaffenburg, German Empire
- Died: April 23, 1997 (aged 89); Vaterstetten, Germany
- Occupation: Reporter
- Known for: Responsible for the Lebensborn in Nazi Germany

Inge Viermetz (7 March 1908 – 23 April 1997) was responsible for the Lebensborn in Nazi Germany. As an assistant to Max Sollmann, head of the Lebensborn, she was acquitted at the RuSHA Trial.

== Biography ==
=== Personal life and career ===
Viermetz studied between 1914 and 1918 at the primary school in Aschaffenburg, and then at a school of higher learning, where she obtained a bachelor's degree. Holding a business degree in 1923, she worked as a reporter from that time to 1932. She married that year, and moved to Austria. She returned to Germany in 1935 and she worked until 1938 in a textile factory in Augsburg, and then as a secretary at a horse racetrack in Munich. She divorced in 1936 and remarried in 1939.

In 1937 she became a member of the National Socialist People's Welfare, the National Socialist Women's League and Reichskolonialbund.

=== Lebensborn ===
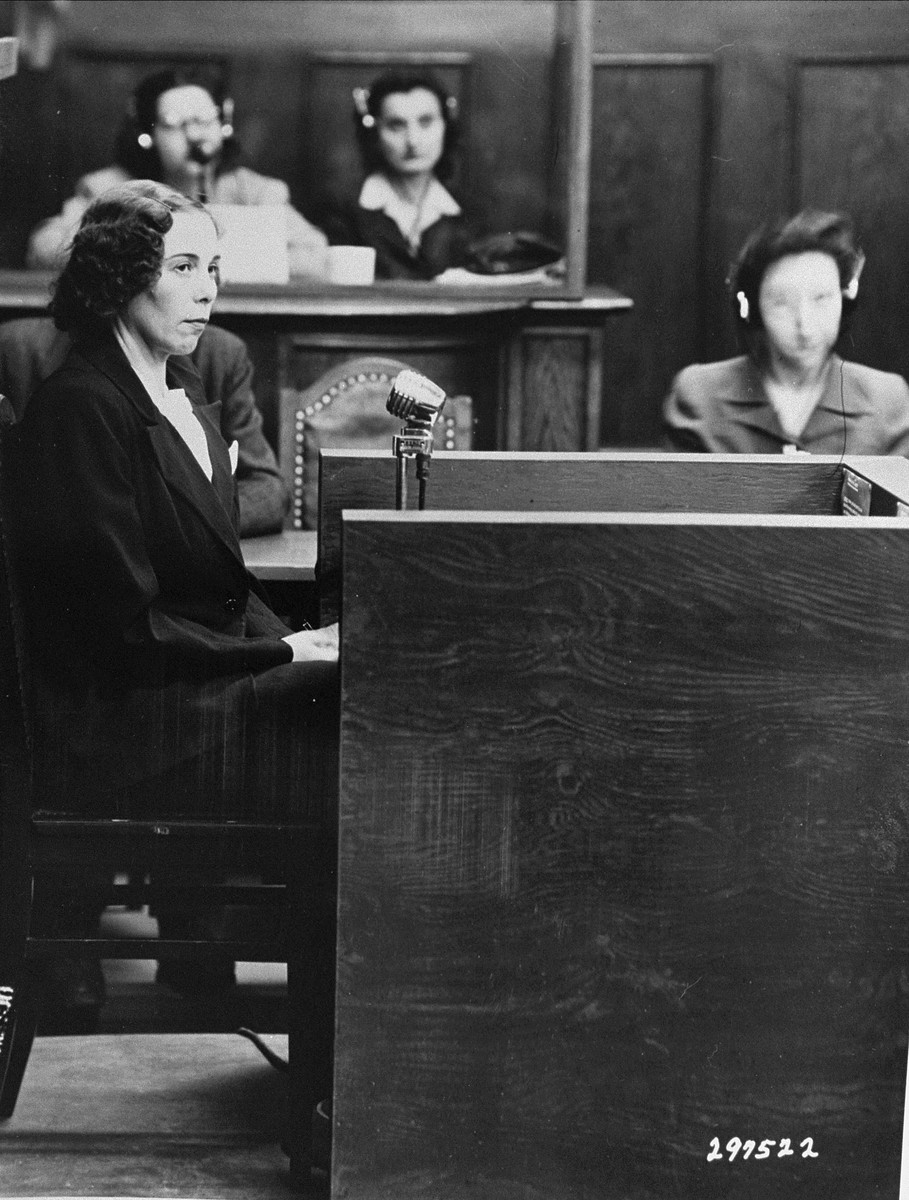
Viermetz during her testimony on 28 January 1948 during the RuSHA Trial.

After a brief period of unemployment, Viermetz found a job in the Lebensborn of Munich. From that moment she belonged to the SS-Gefolge. She first worked as a stenographer, but rose to become a leading figure in the organisation.

From September 1939, she oversaw the department of the placement of single mothers, as well as the department of nursing homes and adoption agencies. For example, one time she was responsible for the transfer of 300 Polish children from Reichsgau Wartheland to the German Reich. From January 1941 to beginning of May 1942, she changed to several different departments within the Lebensborn, such as working in the department of war orphans.

From December 1942 until the summer of 1943, Viermetz was commissioner of the Lebensborn for Belgium and Northern France and the Ardennes, and ran an establishment at Wégimont. During the summer of 1943, it was set aside due to financial irregularities and dismissed on December 21 of the same year. She lived in Munich but then was discharged in February 1944 at Winhöring following the course of the war.

=== Post-war ===
At the end of the war, in July 1945, Viermetz was arrested and incarcerated. In January 1946, she was released, first living in Winhöring, and then Munich from December of the same year. In January 1947, she was imprisoned again and was indicted at the RuSHA Trial. At the trial, which began on 1 July 1947, she was the only woman among the 14 defendants and only the second woman to stand trial in Nuremberg.

Viermetz was accused of the abduction of Polish children with so called "Aryan features", who were brought to the Reich for " Germanization". It was justified by the fact that she was a subordinate employee who had acted out of compassion. She was acquitted on 10 March 1948 and was the only defendant acquitted from charges.

She was recognized as denazified by a court in Munich in 1950. Nothing is known about her life after this.

== Bibliography ==
- Andrea Böltken: Führerinnen im Führerstaat: Gertrud Scholtz-Klink, Trude Mohr, Jutta Rüdiger und Inge Viermetz. Centaurus-Verlag, Pfaffenweiler 1995, Forum Frauengeschichte Bd. 18, ISBN 3-89085-926-7.
- Kathrin Kompisch: Täterinnen. Frauen im Nationalsozialismus, Böhlau Verlag, Köln 2008, ISBN 978-3-412-20188-3.
- Volker Koop, Dem Führer ein Kind schenken – die SS-Organisation "Lebensborn" e.V.. Böhlau Verlag, Köln 2007; 306 Seiten. ISBN 978-3-412-21606-1.
