= Kidnapping of children by Nazi Germany =

Cultural genocide of children in Nazi Germany

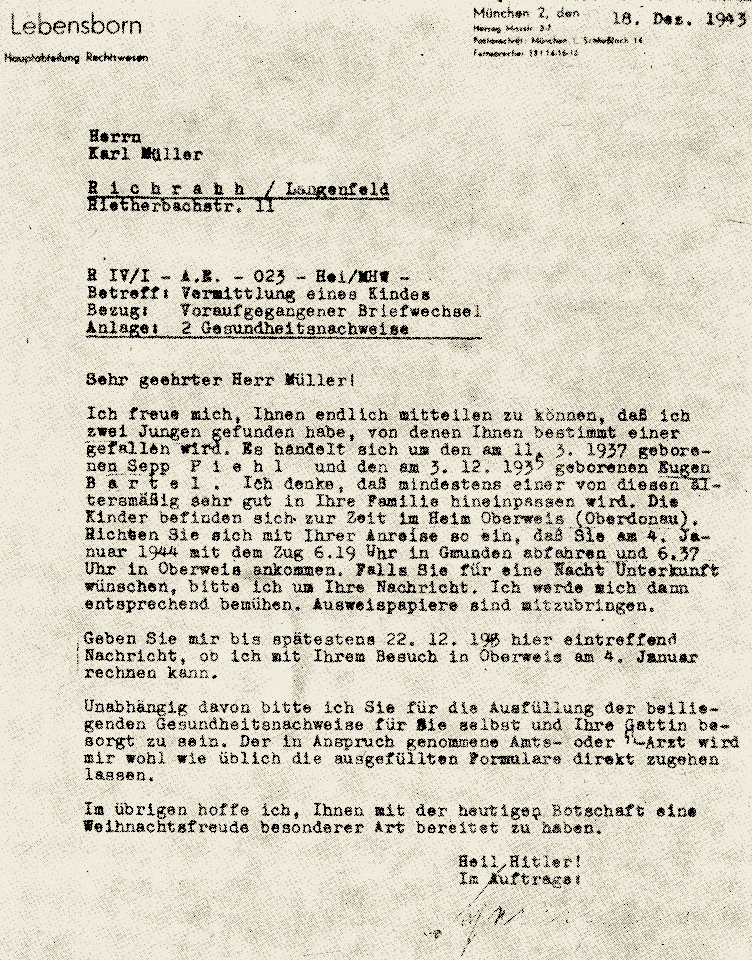
- Letter from Lebensborn office to Reichsdeutsche family of Herr Müller in Germany informing that two perfect boys have been found for them to choose one they like. The boys' names have already been Germanized, 18 December 1943.

Foreign children abducted
- 20,000–200,000 children; 20,000–200,000 from Poland; 20,000 from the Soviet Union; 10,000 from western and southeastern Europe

During World War II, around 200,000 ethnic Polish children as well as an unknown number of children of other Slavic ethnicities from the Soviet Union were abducted from their homes and forcibly transported to Nazi Germany for purposes of forced labour, medical experimentation, or Germanization. This was among the most notable Nazi crimes against children.

An aim of the project was to acquire and "Germanize" children believed to have Aryan/Nordic traits because Nazi officials believed that they were the descendants of German settlers who had emigrated to Poland or the Soviet Union. Those labelled "racially valuable" (gutrassig) were forcibly assimilated in centres and then forcibly adopted to German families and SS Home Schools.

An association, "Stolen Children: Forgotten Victims" (Geraubte Kinder – Vergessene Opfer e.V.), is active in Germany, representing victims of German kidnapping.

== Background ==
In a well-known speech to his military commanders at Obersalzberg on 22 August 1939, Adolf Hitler condoned the killing without pity or mercy of all men, women, and children of Polish race or language.

On 7 November 1939, Hitler decreed that Heinrich Himmler, whose German title at that time was Reichskomissar für die Festigung deutschen Volkstums, would be responsible for policy regarding the population of occupied territories. The plan to kidnap Polish children most likely was created in a document titled Rassenpolitisches Amt der NSDAP.

On 25 November 1939, Himmler was sent a 40-page document titled (in English translation) "The issue of the treatment of population in former Polish territories from a racial-political view." The last chapter of the document concerns "racially valuable" Polish children and plans to forcefully acquire them for German plans and purposes:

we should exclude from deportations racially valuable children and raise them in old Reich in proper educational facilities or in German family care. The children must not be older than eight or ten years, because only till this age we can truly change their national identification, that is "final Germanization". A condition for this is complete separation from any Polish relatives. Children will be given German names, their ancestry will be led by special office.

On 15 May 1940, in a document titled (in German) Einige Gedanken ueber die Behandlung der Fremdenvoelker im Osten ("A Few Thoughts about the Treatment of Racial Aliens in the East"), and in another "top-secret memorandum with limited distribution, dated 25 May 1940", titled (in English translation) "The Treatment of Racial Aliens in the East", Himmler defined special directives for the kidnapping of Polish children. Himmler "also outlined the administration of incorporated Poland and the General Government, where Poles were to be assigned to compulsory labor, and racially selected children were to be abducted and Germanized."

Among Himmler's core points:

- In the territory of Poland, only four grade schools would remain, in which education would be strictly limited. Children would be taught to count only to 500, to write their own names, and that God commanded Poles to serve Germans. Writing was determined to be unnecessary for the Polish population.
- Parents who desired better education for their children would have to apply to the SS and police for a special permit. The permit would be awarded to children deemed "racially valuable". Those children would be taken to Germany to be Germanised. Even then, the fate of each child would be determined by the loyalty and obedience to the German state of his or her parents. A child determined to be "of little racial value" would not receive any further education.
- Annual selection would be made every year among children from six to ten years of age according to German racial standards. Children deemed adequately German would be taken to Germany, given new names and further Germanised. The aim of the plan was to destroy "Polish" as an ethnic group, and leave within Poland a considerable slave population to be used up over the next 10 years. Within 15 to 20 years, Poles would be completely eradicated.

On 20 June 1940, Hitler approved Himmler's directives, ordering copies to be sent to chief organs of the SS, to Gauleiters in German-occupied territories in Eastern Europe, and to the governor of the General Government, and commanding that the operation of kidnapping Polish and other Slavic children in order to seek Aryan descendants for Germanisation be a priority in those territories.

Himmler mused on initiating similar projects in German-occupied France. Hitler's Table Talk records him expressing his belief that "the French problem" would be best solved by yearly extractions of a number of racially healthy children, chosen from "France's Germanic population". He preferred they be placed in German boarding schools, in order to separate them from their "incidental" French nationality, and to make them aware of their "Germanic blood". Hitler responded that the "religious petit-bourgeois tendencies of the French people" would make it almost impossible to "salvage the Germanic elements from the claws of the ruling class of that country". Martin Bormann believed it to be an ingenious policy, noting it in the document record as a [sic] "sinister theory!".

== Conditions of transfer ==
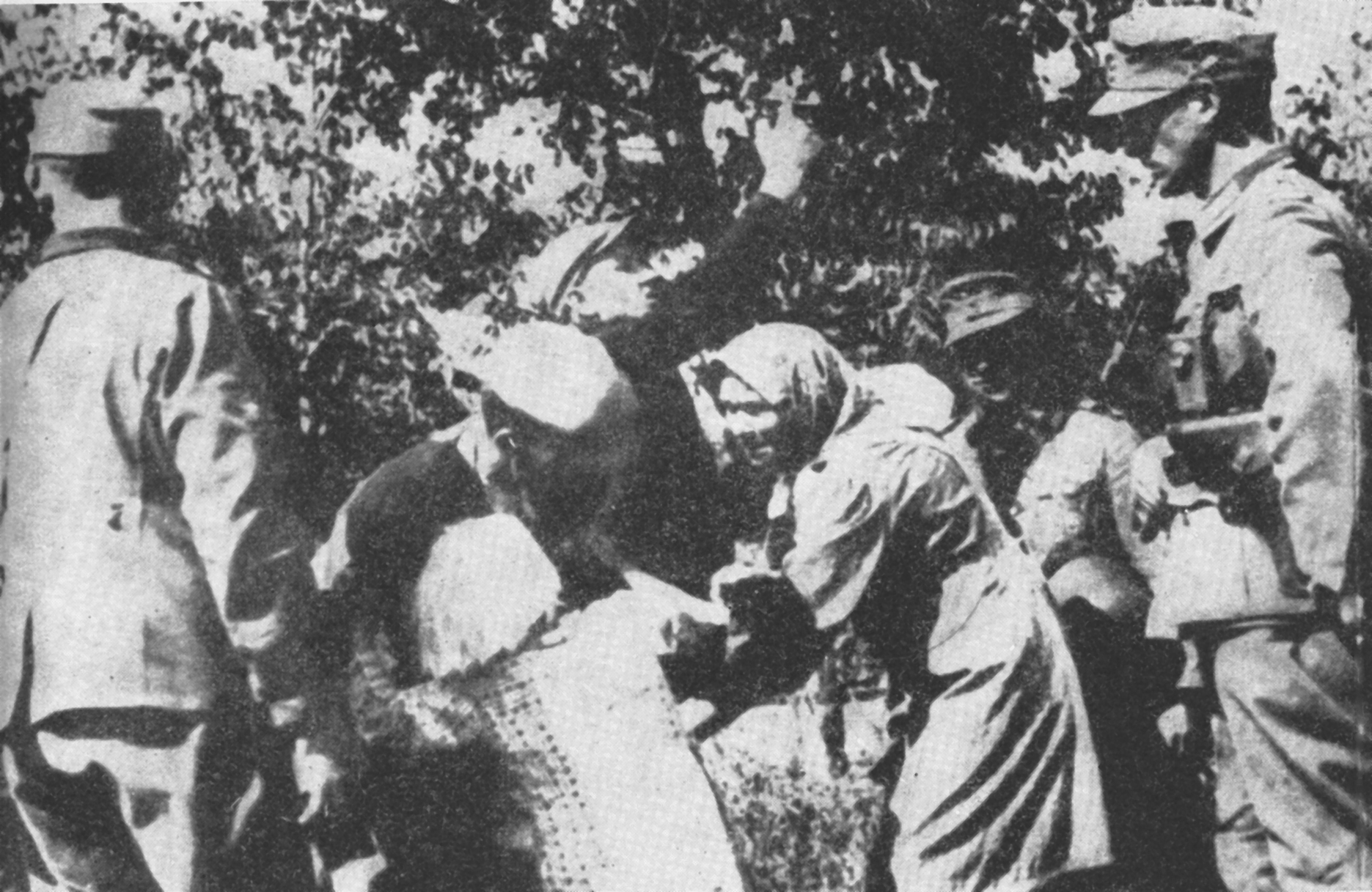
Kidnapping of Polish children during the Nazi-German resettlement operation in Zamość county

The conditions of transfer were very harsh, as the children did not receive food or water for many days. Many children died as a result of suffocation in the summer and cold in the winter. Polish railway workers, often risking their lives, tried to feed the imprisoned children or to give them warm clothes. Sometimes the German guards could be bribed with jewelry or gold to allow the supplies to go through, and in other cases they sold some of the children to Poles. In Bydgoszcz and Gdynia, Poles bought children for 40 Reichsmarks. In some places the German price for a Polish child was 25 zlotys.

The children were kidnapped by force, often after their parents had been murdered in concentration camps or shot as "partisans", including a handful of the children of Lidice. These children would not be permitted to remain even with other living relatives. Some were purportedly from German soldiers and foreign mothers, and others were declared "German orphans" who had been raised by non-German families. Indeed, orphanages and children's homes, along with children living with foster parents, were among the first groups targeted, in the belief that Poles deliberately and systemically Polonized ethnically German children.

Later the children were sent to special centres and institutions or to, as Germans called them, "children education camps" (Kindererziehungslager), which, in reality, were selection camps where their "racial values" were tested, their original metrics of birth destroyed, and their Polish names changed to German names, as part of Germanisation. Those children who were classified as "of little value" were sent to Auschwitz or to Treblinka.

== Selection ==
Kinder-KZ inside Litzmannstadt Ghetto map signed with number 15; where Polish children were selected

The children were placed in special temporary camps of the health department, or Lebensborn e.V., called in German Kindererziehungslager ("children's education camps"). Afterwards they went through special "quality selection" or "racial selection" – a detailed racial examination, combined with psychological tests and medical exams made by experts from RuSHA or doctors from Gesundheitsamt (health department). A child's "racial value" would determine to which of 11 racial types it was assigned, including 62 points assessing body proportions, eye colour, hair colour, and the shape of the skull.

During this testing process, children were divided into three groups (in English translation):

1. "desired population growth" (erwünschter Bevölkerungszuwachs);
2. "acceptable population growth" (tragbarer Bevölkerungszuwachs); and
3. "undesired population growth" (unerwünschter Bevölkerungszuwachs).

The failures that could result in a child, otherwise fitting all racial criteria, into the second group included such traits as "round-headed" referring to the skull shape. Children could be declared the third group for tuberculosis, "degenerate" skull shape, or for "Gypsy characteristics". A girl who was later identified by a small birthmark would have been rejected had the birthmark been much larger.

These racial exams determined the fate of children: whether they would be killed, or sent to concentration camps, or experience other consequences. For example, after forcibly taking a child away from his or her parents, "medical exams" could be performed in secret and in disguise.

Many Nazis were astounded at the number of Polish children found to exhibit "Nordic" traits, but assumed that all such children were genuinely German children, who had been Polonized; Hans Frank summoned up such views when he declared, "When we see a blue-eyed child we are surprised that she is speaking Polish." Among those children thought to be genuinely German were children whose parents had been executed for resisting Germanization.

== German documentation ==
Once selected, the children between six and twelve were sent to special homes. Their names were altered to similar-sounding German ones. They were compelled to learn German and beaten if they persisted in speaking Polish. They were informed their parents were dead even if they were not. Children who would not learn German or remembered their Polish origin were sent back to youth camps in Poland. In some cases, the efforts were so successful that the children lived and died believing themselves to be Germans.

The authorities were reluctant to let the children be officially adopted, as the proceedings might reveal their Polish origin. Indeed, some children were maltreated when their adoptive parents learned that they were Polish. Adoption was also problematic because surveillance or more information might reveal problems with the child. When it was learned that Rosalie K's mother was epileptic, for instance, it was immediately concluded, despite the wishes of her German foster parents, that Germanization, education and adoption were therefore not justifiable. When adoptive parents demanded adoption certificates, such records were forged for them.

== German medical experiments ==
Those children who did not pass harsh Nazi exams and criteria and who were therefore selected during the operation, were sent as test subjects for experiments in special centres. Children sent there ranged from eight months to 18 years. Two such centres were located in German-occupied Poland. One of them, Medizinische Kinderheilanstalt, was in Lubliniec in Upper Silesia – in this centre children were also subject to forced "euthanasia"; while the second was located in Cieszyn. Children were given psychoactive drugs, chemicals and other substances for medical tests, although it was generally known that the true purpose of those procedures was their mass extermination.

== Murder of Zamość children in Auschwitz ==
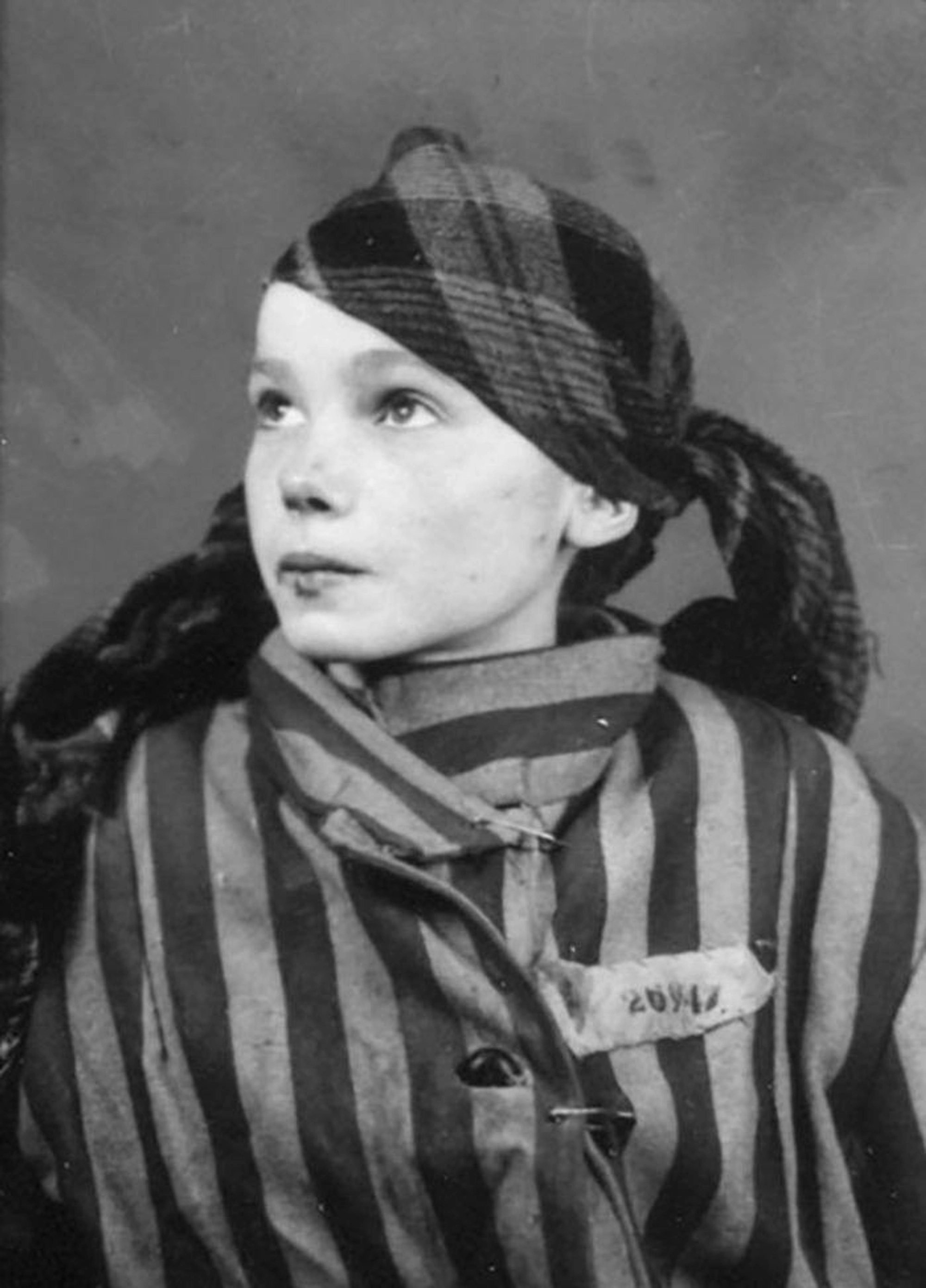
Czesława Kwoka, one of many Polish children murdered at Auschwitz by the Nazis

At Auschwitz concentration camp 200 to 300 Polish children from the Zamość area were murdered by the Nazis by phenol injections. The child was placed on a stool, occasionally blindfolded with a piece of a towel. The person performing the execution then placed one of his hands on the back of the child's neck and another behind the shoulder blade. As the child's chest was thrust out a long needle was used to inject a toxic dose of phenol into the chest. The children usually died in minutes. A witness described the process as deadly efficient: "As a rule not even a moan would be heard. And they did not wait until the doomed person really died. During his agony, he was taken from both sides under the armpits and thrown into a pile of corpses in another room… And the next victim took his place on the stool."

To trick the soon-to-be murdered children into obedience Germans promised them that they would work at a brickyard. However another group of children, young boys by the age of 8 to 12, managed to warn their fellow child inmates by calling for help when they were being killed by the Nazis: "Mamo! Mamo!" ('Mama! Mama!'), the dying screams of the children, were heard by several inmates and made an indelible haunting impression on them.'"

== Heuaktion ==
In a plan called "Heuaktion", described in a "top secret" memorandum submitted to German Interior Minister Heinrich Himmler on 10 June 1944, Gottlob Berger, head of the SS Main Office and simultaneously Chief of Political Operations at the Reich Ministry for the Occupied Eastern Territories, proposed that the German Wehrmacht "evacuate" 40,000–50,000 children between 10 and 14 from the "territory of Army Group Centre" to work for the Third Reich.

Between March and October 1944, 28,000 children between the ages of 10 and 18 were recorded as deported from Belarus for work in the German arms industry.

== Post-war repatriation efforts ==
The extent of the program became clear to Allied forces over the course of months, as they found groups of "Germanized" children and became aware that many more were in the German population. Locating these children turned up their stories of forcible instruction in the German language and how the failures were killed. Teams were constituted to search for the children, a particularly important point when dealing with institutions, where a single investigator could only interview a few children before all the rest were coached to provide false information. Many children had to be lured into speaking the truth; as for instance complimenting their German and asking how long they had spoken it, and only when told that a nine-year-old had spoken German for four years, pointing out that they must have spoken before then, whereupon the child could be brought to admit to having spoken Polish. Some children suffered emotional trauma when they were removed from their adoptive German parents, often the only parents they remembered, and returned to their biological parents, when they no longer remembered Polish, only German. The older children generally remembered Poland; ones as young as ten had forgotten much, but could often be reminded by such things as Polish nursery rhymes; the youngest had no memories that could be recalled.

Allied forces made efforts to repatriate them. However, many children, particularly Polish and Yugoslavian who were among the first taken, declared on being found that they were German. Russian and Ukrainian children, while not gotten to this stage, still had been taught to hate their native countries and did not want to return. While many foster parents voluntarily brought forth well-cared-for children, other children proved to be abused or used for labour, and still other adoptive parents went to great efforts to hide the children.

After the war, The United States of America v. Ulrich Greifelt, et al., or the RuSHA Trial, the eighth of the twelve Nuremberg Trials, dealt with the kidnapping of children by the Nazis. Many children testified, although many of their parents were afraid to let them return to Germany. From 1947 to 1948, the Nuremberg Trials ruled that the abductions, exterminations, and Germanization constituted genocide.

Only 10 to 15 percent of those abducted returned to their homes. When Allied effort to identify such children ceased, 13,517 inquiries were still open, and it was clear that German authorities would not be returning them.

== Statistics ==
Between 1940 and 1945, according to official Polish estimates, approximately 200,000 Polish children were abducted by the Nazis. William Rubinstein cites the figure of up to 200,000 Polish children kidnapped by Nazis. According to Dirk Moses' estimate, 20,000 children were abducted for such purposes from Poland, 20,000 from the Soviet Union, and 10,000 from Western Europe and Southeast Europe. Tadeusz Piotrowski in his book Poland's Holocaust states that 200,000 Polish children were kidnapped out of which only 15 to 20% were reclaimed by either parents or the Polish government after the war. According to Tara Zahra, the number of children taken from their parents includes 40,000 to 50,000 children taken as part of Heuaktion for forced labour from Belarus, 28,000 Soviet youth "under the age of eighteen" taken for labour by the Luftwaffe, "tens of thousands" of Polish, Czech, Slovenian and Serbian children taken during evacuations after which they ended up in orphanages and Hitler Youth camps, unspecified number of children taken by force from women working as forced labour in Germany, and 20,000–50,000 "deliberately kidnapped" in Eastern Europe. Additional non-German-speaking children were evacuated along with German civilians, while tens of thousands of foreign children were recruited as forced labourers or born to female forced labourers in Germany. Confusion between ethnic German children from Eastern Europe and non-German children was another factor that led to inflated estimates. The modern association "Stolen children. Forgotten victims" representing victims of this operation presented the following estimates as of 2018:

- Poland: 50,000–200,000 kidnapped children
- Heuaktion in Poland, Ukraine and Belarus: 40,000–50,000 kidnapped children
- Bohemia and Moravia: 1,000 kidnapped children
- Slovenia: 1,100 kidnapped children

Post-war estimates on kidnapped children vary depending on criteria used; Isabell Heinemann in the documentary "Kinderraub der Nazis. Die vergessenen Opfer" stated that her research team identified 20,000 Polish children kidnapped who passed the Germanization criteria and were integrated into the Lebensborn program. While Polish estimates, for example, include children taken under different conditions, such as those taken away forcefully from women working as forced labour in Germany. Precise numbers are difficult to ascertain and depend on classification of kidnapping and if one counts children born to parents used as forced labour.

== Memorials ==
After the war, a memorial plate was made in Lublin dedicated to railway workers who tried to save Polish children from German captivity.

== Remembrance ==
In 2017, the German broadcaster Deutsche Welle and Polish journalists from Interia.pl engaged in a remembrance project documenting history and fate of kidnapped children. Journalists visited institutions, archives and foundations, as well as victims who are still alive today. Numerous surviving victims have been interviewed presenting their attempts to trace back their origins, claim compensation or present their story. Together, as part of this series, over 40 articles and 23 video documentaries were produced, culminating in a book and a movie documentary which was presented by German state broadcaster ARD.

== See also ==
- Child abductions in the Russo-Ukrainian War
- Lost children of Francoism
- Stolen Generations
- Lebensborn
