= Rusha (disambiguation) =

Rusha may refer to:

- RuSHA, The Rasse- und Siedlungshauptamt-SS, a Nazi organization
- RuSHA Trial, the eighth of the twelve war crimes trials the US authorities held in Germany following the Second World War, the above organization being part of the trials
- Lea Rusha, one of several people convicted for his part in the 2007 Securitas depot robbery
- A Hebrew derogatory word (רָשָׁע) which literally means a deliberate sinner, commonly used to describe a cruel person
