= Lee Wyatt =

American judge (1890–1960)

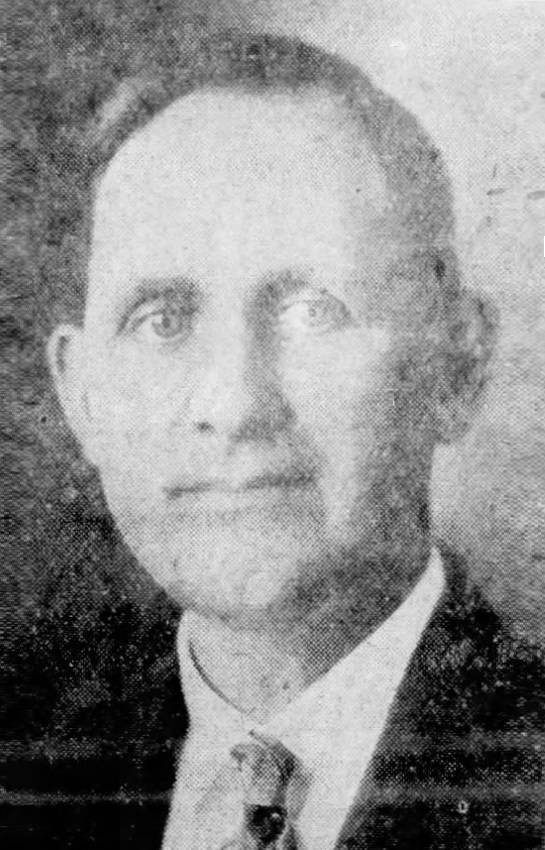
- Wyatt in 1928

Justice of the Supreme Court of Georgia
- In office 1943 – February 6, 1960; On leave October 1947–March 1948

Member of the Georgia General Assembly
- In office January, 1917 – 1922

City Attorney of LaGrange
- In office 1923–1931

Personal details
- Born: July 13, 1890 Centralhatchee, Georgia
- Died: February 6, 1960 (aged 69)
- Education: Fourth District Agricultural and Mechanical School; Bowdon College; Mercer University

Lee Buren Wyatt (July 13, 1890 – February 6, 1960) was a Georgia lawyer and politician who served as a justice of the Supreme Court of Georgia from 1943 until his death in 1960. During his service on the court, he took a leave of absence in 1947 and 1948 to preside over Nazi war crimes trials in Nuremberg, Germany.

== Early life, education, and career ==
Born in Centralhatchee, Heard County, Georgia, Wyatt graduated from the Fourth District A & M School (now the University of West Georgia), in Carrollton, and attended Bowdon College before receiving an LL.B. from Mercer University in 1914. He entered the private practice of law in LaGrange in 1914.

In 1916, Wyatt was elected to the Georgia General Assembly as a representative for Troup County, taking office in 1917 and serving until 1922. He was thereafter the city attorney for LaGrange from 1923 to 1931.

== Judicial service ==
=== Superior Court judge and the Angelo Herndon case ===
In 1931, he was appointed as a judge of the Superior Courts of the Coweta Circuit, holding his first session on September 22, 1931. In 1933, Wyatt presided over the trial of Angelo Herndon, an African-American labor organizer arrested and convicted of insurrection after attempting to organize black and white industrial workers in 1932 in Atlanta, Georgia. A later account of the trial described Wyatt as "an inexperienced judge brought in from the rural counties that constituted the base of political support for the segregationists who dominated state-level politics in Georgia".

Wyatt treated both Herndon and Herndon's African-American lawyer, Benjamin J. Davis Jr., with disdain, pointedly turning away or reading a newspaper when Davis made arguments before the court. Wyatt denied a motion by Davis challenging the exclusion of black jurors "without even hearing arguments or evidence", and allowed prosecutors to use racial slurs and other charged language against both Herndon and Davis. However, Wyatt was noted to have "ended the proceedings with an unexpectedly fair jury charge that raised serious questions about whether Herndon had taken enough concrete steps toward immediate revolution as to violate the statute", a decision that was described as taking a risk, because this jury instruction "was more protective of Herndon's Communist advocacy than either the Georgia Supreme Court's interpretation of the statute or the U.S. Supreme Court's emerging First Amendment 'clear and present danger' test". The jury convicted Herndon, which Wyatt deemed "perfectly justified", sentencing Herndon to 18 to 20 years of hard labor. The conviction was later overturned on appeal.

=== Georgia Supreme Court justice and Nuremberg Trials judge ===
In 1943, Governor Ellis Arnall appointed Wyatt to a seat on the state supreme court vacated by the elevation of R. C. Bell to the office of chief justice. Wyatt was then elected to a full term on the court in 1944, running unopposed. In March 1947, Wyatt was a judge during the three governors controversy, ruling against Governor Talmadge.

In the aftermath of World War II, and while still serving on the court, Wyatt took a leave of absence to accept an appointment from President Harry S. Truman to preside over Nazi war crimes trials in Nuremberg, Germany, for which he "achieved international fame". From October 1947 to March 1948, Wyatt presided over the RuSHA trial, "a three-judge tribunal trying Nazi war criminals at Nuremberg, Germany", specifically, 14 former SS officials and Nazi leaders associated with Heinrich Himmler". All but one were convicted. Over the course of the proceedings, Wyatt was required to familiarize himself with the facts of the Holocaust, and later said in an interview that the horrors of that period were "impossible to describe", and that "nobody can realize the untold destruction and suffering". He also returned from Nuremberg with a deep concern about Russia and its intentions towards the United States. In a 1949 speech, he decried the communist "infiltration", and advised that the United States should gather all communists and put them on a boat to Russia, with Henry A. Wallace as "pilot of that boat".

In 1953, Wyatt became presiding justice of the state supreme court, following the death of Justice William Yates Atkinson. Wyatt remained on the court until his death.

== Personal life and death ==
Wyatt married Sara Baker on December 25, 1939. They had no children. He died from coronary thrombosis at a hospital in LaGrange, at the age of 69. He was interred at Shadowlawn Cemetery in LaGrange.

Political offices
Preceded by Charles S. Reid	Justice of the Supreme Court of Georgia; 1943–1960	Succeeded by Joseph D. Quillian
