= Lebensborn =

Nazi Germany eugenics program

Lebensborn e.V.
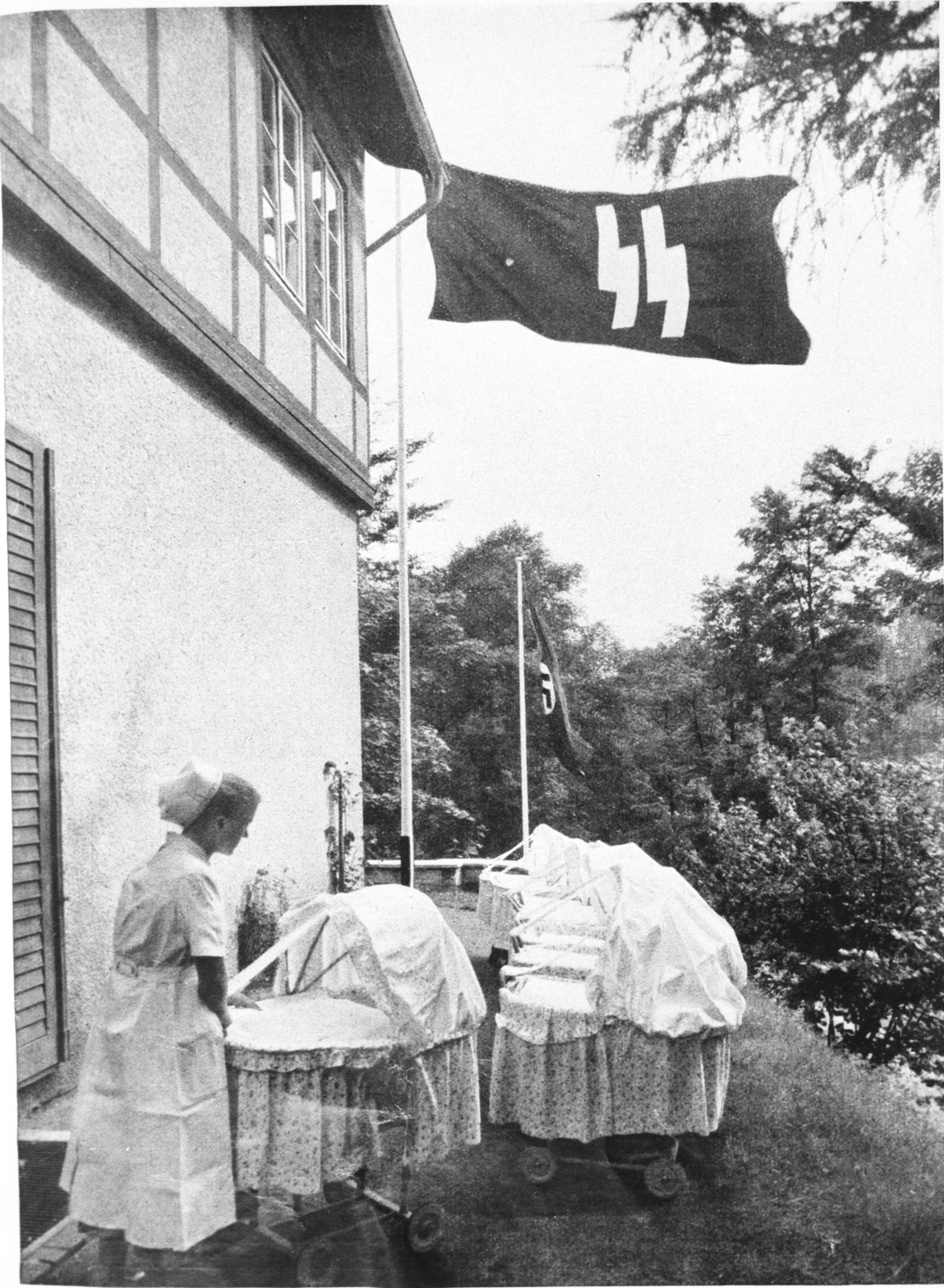
- A Lebensborn birth house
- Formation: 12 December 1935
- Founder: Heinrich Himmler
- Dissolved: 1945
- Headquarters: Munich, Germany
- Members: 8,000 (1939)

Lebensborn e.V. (/ˈleɪbənzˌbɔːrn/, German pronunciation: [ˈleːbənsˌbɔʁn], lit. 'Fount of Life') was a secret, SS-initiated, state-registered association in Nazi Germany with the stated goal of increasing the number of children born who met the Nazi standards of "racially pure" and "healthy" Aryans, based on Nazi eugenics (also called "racial hygiene" by some eugenicists). Lebensborn was established by Heinrich Himmler, and provided welfare to its mostly unmarried mothers, encouraged anonymous births by unmarried women at their maternity homes, and mediated adoption of children by likewise "racially pure" and "healthy" parents, particularly SS members and their families. The Cross of Honour of the German Mother was given to the women who bore the most Aryan children.

Set up in Germany in 1935, Lebensborn expanded into several occupied European countries with Germanic populations during World War II. It included the selection of "racially worthy" orphans for adoption and care for children born from Aryan women who had been in relationships with SS members. It originally excluded children born from unions between common soldiers and foreign women, because there was no proof of "racial purity" on both sides. During the war, many children were kidnapped from their parents and judged by Aryan criteria for their suitability to be raised in Lebensborn homes, and fostered by German families.

At the Nuremberg trials, much direct evidence was found of the kidnapping of children by Nazi Germany during the period 1939–1945.

== History ==
=== Background ===
The Lebensborn e.V. (e.V. stands for eingetragener Verein or registered association), meaning "fount of life", was founded on 12 December 1935, to counteract falling birth rates in Germany, and to promote Nazi eugenics. Located in Munich, the organization was partly an office within the Schutzstaffel (SS) responsible for certain family welfare programs, and partly a society for Nazi leaders.

On 13 September 1936, Heinrich Himmler wrote the following to members of the SS:

The organisation "Lebensborn e.V." serves the SS leaders in the selection and adoption of qualified children. The organisation "Lebensborn e.V." is under my personal direction, is part of the Race and Settlement Central Bureau of the SS, and has the following obligations:

1. Support racially, biologically and hereditarily valuable families with many children.
2. Placement and care of racially, biologically and hereditarily valuable pregnant women, who, after thorough examination of their and the progenitor's families by the Race and Settlement Central Bureau of the SS, can be expected to produce equally valuable children.
3. Care for the children.
4. Care for the children's mothers.

It is the honorable duty of all leaders of the central bureau to become members of the organisation "Lebensborn e.V.". The application for admission must be filed prior to 23 September 1936.

In 1939, membership stood at 8,000, of which 3,500 were SS leaders. The Lebensborn office was part of SS Rasse und Siedlungshauptamt (SS Race and Settlement Main Office) until 1938, when it was transferred to Hauptamt Persönlicher Stab Reichsführer-SS (Personal Staff of the Reichführer-SS), i.e., directly overseen by Himmler. Leaders of Lebensborn e.V. were SS-Standartenführer Max Sollmann and SS-Oberführer Dr. Gregor Ebner.

=== Implementation ===
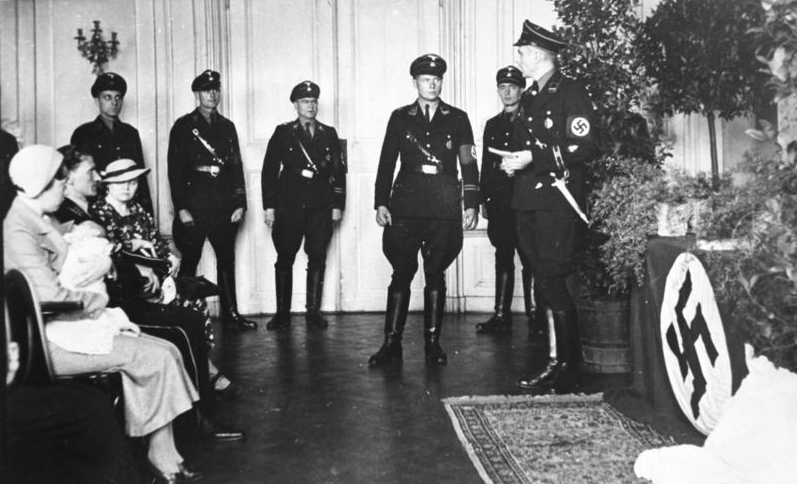
Christening of a Lebensborn child, c. 1935–1936, Rhenish Hesse region

Initially the programme served as a welfare institution for wives of SS officers; the organization ran facilities – primarily maternity homes – where women could give birth or get help with family matters. The programme also accepted unmarried women who were either pregnant or had already given birth and were in need of aid, provided that both the woman and the father of the child were classified as "racially valuable". About 60% of the mothers were unmarried. The program allowed them to give birth secretly away from home without social stigma. In case the mothers wanted to give up the children, the program also had orphanages and an adoption service. When dealing with non-SS members, parents and children were usually examined by SS doctors before admission.

The first Lebensborn home (known as "Heim Hochland") opened in 1936, in Steinhöring, a tiny village not far from Munich. The first home outside of Germany opened in Norway in 1941. Many of these facilities were established in confiscated houses and former nursing homes owned by Jews. Leaders of the League of German Girls were instructed to recruit young women with the potential to become good breeding partners for SS officers.

While Lebensborn e.V. established facilities in several occupied countries, its activities were concentrated around Germany, Norway and occupied northeastern Europe, mainly Poland. The main focus in occupied Norway was aiding children born to Norwegian women and fathered by German soldiers. In northeastern Europe the organisation, in addition to services provided to SS members, engaged in the transfer of children, mostly orphans, to families in Germany.

Lebensborn e.V. had or planned to have facilities in the following countries (some were merely field offices):

- Germany: 10
- Austria: 3
- Poland (General Government – the occupied Polish territory and annexed lands of Poland): 6 (8 if Stettin and Bad Polzin are included.)
- Norway: 9
- Denmark: 2
- France: 1 (February 1944 – August 1944) – in Lamorlaye
- Belgium: 1 (March 1943 – September 1944) – in Wégimont, in the municipality of Soumagne
- Netherlands: 1
- Luxembourg: 1

About 8,000 children were born in Lebensborn homes in Germany, and a similar number in Norway. Elsewhere the total number of births was much lower.

In Norway the Lebensborn organisation handled approximately 250 adoptions. In most of these cases the mothers had agreed to the adoption, but not all were informed that their children would be sent to Germany for adoption. The Norwegian government recovered only 170 of these children after the war.

=== Germanisation ===
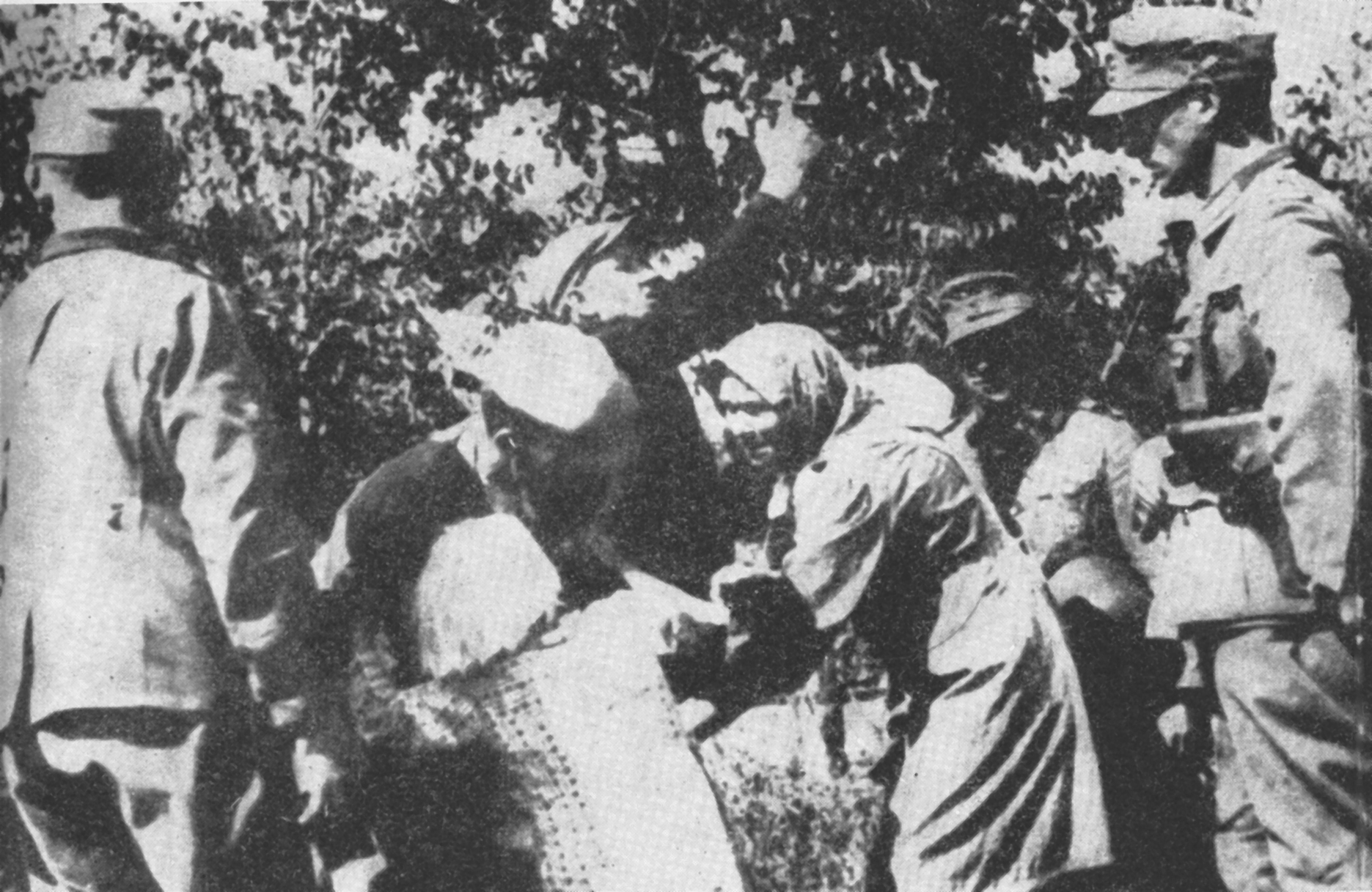
Kidnapping of Polish children during the Nazi-German resettlement operation in Zamość county

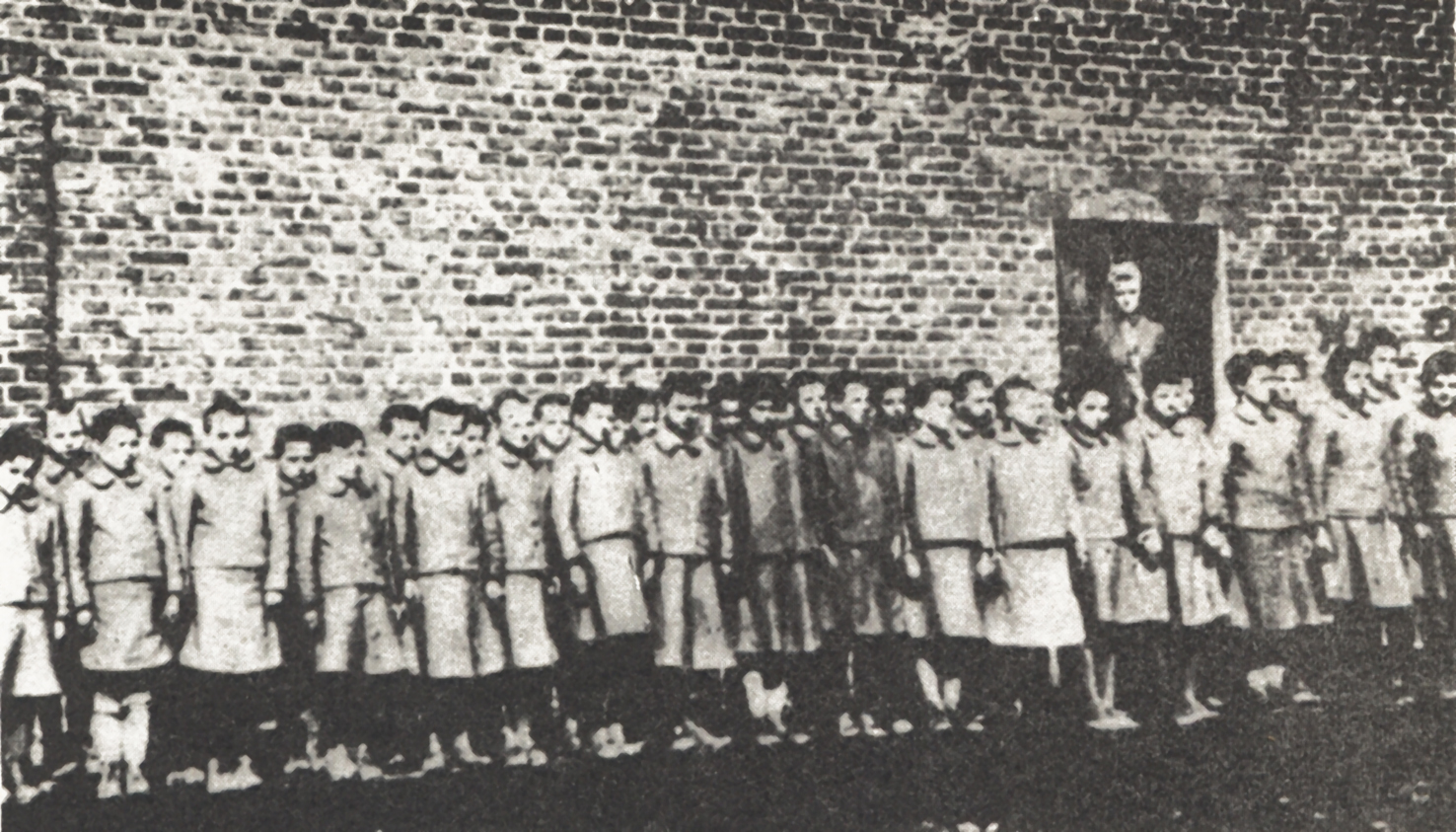
Polish children in Nazi-German labour camp in Dzierżązna near Zgierz

In 1939, the Nazis started to kidnap children from foreign countries – mainly from Yugoslavia and Poland, but also Russia, Ukraine, Czechoslovakia, Romania, Estonia, Latvia, and Norway – for the Lebensborn program. They started to do this because "It is our duty to take [the children] with us to remove them from their environment ... either we win over any good blood that we can use for ourselves and give it a place in our people or we destroy this blood," Himmler reportedly said.

The Nazis would seize children in full view of the parents. The kidnapped children were administered several tests and were categorised into three groups:

- Those considered desirable to be included into the German population.
- Those who were acceptable.
- The unwanted.

The children classified as unwanted were taken to concentration camps to work or were killed. The children from the other groups, if between the ages of 2 and 6, were placed with families in the programme to be brought up by them in a kind of foster child status. Children of ages 6 to 12 were placed in German boarding schools. The schools assigned the children new German names and taught them to be proud to be part of Germany. They forced the children to forget their birth parents and erased any records of their ancestry. Those who resisted Germanisation were beaten and, if a child continued to rebel, they would be sent to a concentration camp.

In the final stages of the war, the files of all children kidnapped for the programme were destroyed. As a result, researchers have found it nearly impossible to learn how many children were taken. The Polish government has claimed that 10,000 children were kidnapped, and less than 15% were returned to their biological parents. Other estimates include numbers as high as 200,000, although according to Dirk Moses a more likely number is around 20,000.

=== Post-war ===
==== Kidnapping charges ====
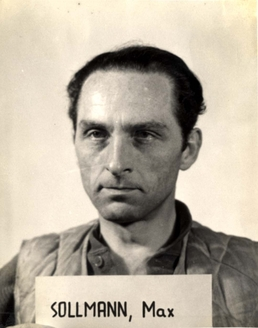
Max Sollmann before his trial at Nuremberg

After the war, the branch of the Lebensborn organisation operating in northeastern Europe was accused of kidnapping children deemed "racially valuable" in order to resettle them with German families. However, of approximately 10,000 foreign-born children located after the war in the American-controlled area of Germany, in the trial of the leaders of the Lebensborn organisation (United States of America v. Ulrich Greifelt, et al.), the court found that 340 had been handled by Lebensborn e.V. The accused were acquitted on charges of kidnapping.

The court found ample evidence of an existing programme of the kidnapping or forced movement of children in northeastern Europe, but concluded that these activities were carried out by individuals who were not members of Lebensborn. Exactly how many children were moved by Lebensborn or other organisations remains unknown due to the destruction of archives by SS members prior to fleeing the advancing Allied forces.

From the trial's transcript:

The prosecution has failed to prove with the requisite certainty the participation of Lebensborn, and the defendants connected there with in the kidnapping programme conducted by the Nazis. While the evidence has disclosed that thousands upon thousands of children were unquestionably kidnapped by other agencies or organisations and brought into Germany, the evidence has further disclosed that only a small percentage of the total number ever found their way into Lebensborn. And of this number only in isolated instances did Lebensborn take children who had a living parent. The majority of those children in any way connected with Lebensborn were orphans of ethnic Germans. Upon the evidence submitted, the defendant Sollmann is found not guilty on counts one and two of the indictment.

==== Treatment of children ====
After Germany's surrender, the press reported on the unusually good weight and health of the "super babies". They spent time outdoors in sunlight and received two baths a day. Everything that came into contact with the babies was disinfected first. Nurses ensured that the children ate everything given to them. Until the last days of the war, the mothers and the children at maternity homes got the best treatment available, including food, although others in the area were starving. Once the war ended, local communities often took revenge on the women, beating them, cutting off their hair, and running them out of the community. Many Lebensborn children were born to unwed mothers. After the war, Lebensborn survivors were often subjected to ostracization.

==== False assumptions ====
Himmler's effort to secure a "racially pure" Greater Germany, sloppy journalism on the subject, and Nazi ideology retained by some, led to persistent false assumptions about the programme. The main misconception was that the programme involved coercive breeding. The first stories reporting that Lebensborn was a coercive breeding programme can be found in the German-language magazine Revue, which ran a series on the subject in the 1950s.

The programme did intend to promote the growth of Aryan populations, through encouraging relationships between German soldiers and Nordic women in occupied countries. Access to Lebensborn was restricted in accordance with the Nordicist eugenic and racial policies of Nazism, which could be referred to as supervised selective breeding. Recently discovered records and ongoing testimony of Lebensborn children – and some of their parents – shows that some SS men did sire children in Himmler's Lebensborn program. This was widely rumored within Germany during the period of the programme.

== Self-help groups and aftermath ==
In Norway, children born to Norwegian mothers by German fathers were allegedly often bullied, raped, abused, and persecuted by the government after the war, and placed in mental institutions. The Norwegian government attempted to deport Lebensborn children to Germany, Brazil, and Australia, but did not succeed. A group of Lebensborn children sought compensation from the Norwegian government, which they saw as being complicit in their mistreatment. In 2008, their case before the European Court of Human Rights was dismissed as the events had happened too long ago, but they were each offered an £8,000 payment from the Norwegian government.

In November 2006, in the German town of Wernigerode, an open meeting took place among several Lebensborn children, with the intention of dispelling myths and encouraging those affected to investigate their origins.

General documents on Lebensborn activities are administered by International Tracing Service and by German Federal Archives. The association Verein kriegskind.de is among those that published search efforts (Suchbitten) to identify Lebensborn children.

Several of the surviving Lebensborn children appeared in Wars Don't End, a 2018 documentary film directed by Dheeraj Akolkar and narrated by Liv Ullmann.

== In popular culture ==
The Czech TV film Spring of Life (2000) tells the story of a Sudeten German teenager recruited as a future mother into a Lebensborn in Poland.

In the television series, The Man in the High Castle, Joe Blake and Nicole Dörmer are among several characters who were Lebensborn children.

The video game My Child Lebensborn, which won the BAFTA Games Awards in 2018 for "Game Beyond Entertainment", lets players experience the bullying Lebensborn children went through after the war.

In the novel and film Sophie's Choice, Sophie unsuccessfully attempts to place her son in the Lebensborn program.

In the historical fiction novel When Love Was Hated, a Norwegian woman becomes a Tyskerjente, a German's Girl, and unwittingly joins the Lebensborn program.

== See also ==
- Baby factory
- Children in the Holocaust
- RuSHA trial
