= RuSHA trial =

Trial against 14 Nazi SS officials

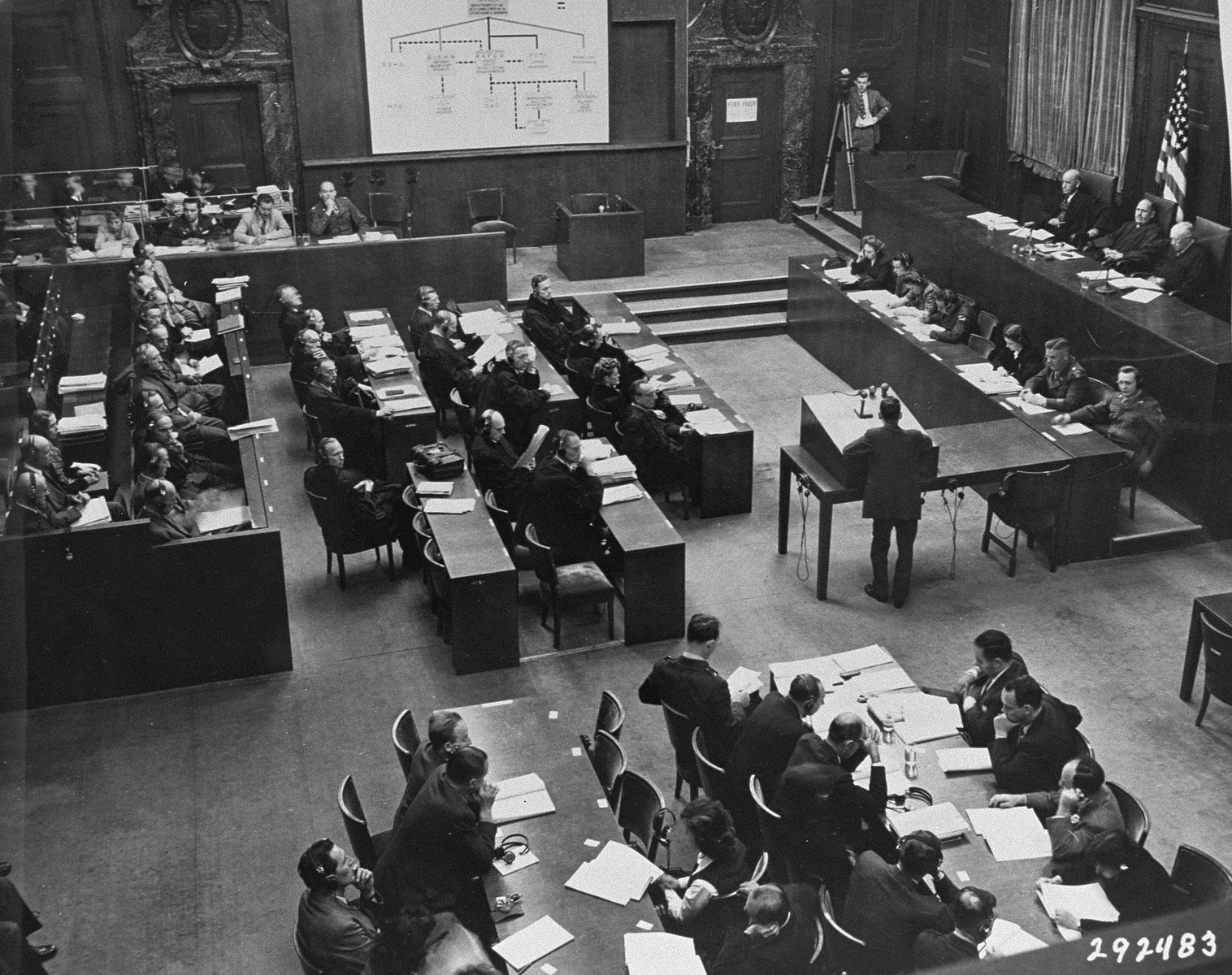
- First day of the RuSHA trial, October 20, 1947
- Indictment: July 7, 1947, Nuremberg
- Decided: March 10, 1948

United States of America vs. Ulrich Greifelt, et al., commonly known as the RuSHA trial, was the eighth of the twelve "subsequent Nuremberg trials" for war crimes and crimes against humanity after the end of World War II between 1947 and 1948. The accused were 14 officials of the Race and Settlement Main Office (RuSHA), the Reich Commission for the Consolidation of German Nationhood, the Volksdeutsche Mittelstelle, and the Lebenborn e.V., charged with crimes tied to implementing Nazi racial policies in Central and Eastern Europe which included ethnic cleansing.

The RuSHA trial was held by United States authorities at the Palace of Justice in Nuremberg in the American occupation zone before US military courts, not before the International Military Tribunal. Thirteen of the fourteen accused were found guilty: eight for all three charges, and five only for being members of an illegal organization due to their membership in the SS. One received life imprisonment, seven received prison sentences between 25 and 10 years, and five were released for time served. The only acquittal was Inge Viermetz, who was found not guilty of crimes against humanity and war crimes, and as a woman was not eligible to join the SS.

The judges in the RuSHA trial, heard before Military Tribunal I, were Lee B. Wyatt (presiding judge), Associate Justice of the Supreme Court of Georgia; Daniel T. O'Connell of the Superior Court of Massachusetts, and Johnson T. Crawford from Oklahoma. The Chief of Counsel for the Prosecution was Telford Taylor. The indictment was served on July 7, 1947; the trial lasted from October 20, 1947, until March 10, 1948.

== Case ==
The racial policy of Nazi Germany created two racial categories—Untermenschen and Aryans—to which all peoples and ethnicities belonged. The Untermenschen were inferior people fit only for extermination, mainly referring to Jews and Slavs who inhabited much of Central and Eastern Europe. The Nazis, as part of the Lebensraum concept, sought to conquer these lands, depopulate them of Untermenschen, and resettle them with Germans and other superior "Aryan" peoples to create a Greater German Reich. Nazi racial policy resulted in forced Germanization, forced abortions, and population transfers of people in Central and Eastern Europe.

The main agencies responsible for enforcing Nazi racial policy, all of which belonged to the SS were:

- The Race and Settlement Main Office (RuSHA) — an organization for "safeguarding the racial purity of the SS" that served as advisory and executive office for all questions of racial policy. The trial was nicknamed for RuSHA though only four of the defendants were members.
- The Reich Commissioner for the Consolidation of German Nationhood (RKFDV) — an office led by SS chief Heinrich Himmler responsible for the return and resettlement of the ethnic Germans from abroad.
- The Volksdeutsche Mittelstelle (VoMi) — an organization to manage the interests of ethnic Germans living outside of Nazi Germany. It was responsible for implementing the settlement of ethnic Germans in conquered territories in Eastern Europe.
- The Lebensborn e.V. — a registered association of the SS with the stated goal of increasing the number of Aryan children born. Many non-German children, judged by Aryan criteria for their suitability to be raised in Lebensborn homes, were kidnapped from their parents and fostered by German families.

== Indictment ==
1. Crimes against humanity in furtherance of "racial purity" programmes by kidnapping children, encouraging or compelling "non-Aryan" pregnant women to undergo abortions, providing abortion services and removing cases of abortion from the jurisdiction of Polish courts; plundering, deportation of populations from their native lands in occupied countries and resettling of so-called "ethnic Germans" (Volksdeutsche) on such lands, sending people who had had "interracial" sexual relationships to concentration camps, and general participation in the persecution of Jews.
2. War crimes for the same reasons.
3. Membership of a criminal organization, the SS.

All defendants were indicted on counts 1 and 2. Inge Viermetz was excluded from count 3. All defendants pleaded "not guilty".

== Defendants ==
Mug shot	Name	Function	Charges	Sentence
	Ulrich Greifelt	Chief of Staff of RKFDV	Found guilty of all three counts	Life imprisonment; died in prison in 1949
	Rudolf Creutz	Deputy to Greifelt	Found guilty of all three counts	15 years; reduced to 10 years; released in 1951; died in 1980
	Konrad Meyer-Hetling	Office head in RKFDV	Found guilty of count 3	Time already served (since May 27, 1945); released after the judgment; died in 1973
	Otto Schwarzenberger	Office head in RKFDV	Found guilty of count 3	Time already served (since May 2, 1945); released after the judgment; died in 1978
	Herbert Hübner (SS officer)	Chief of Poznań office of RKFDV and representative of RuSHA in western Poland	Found guilty of all three counts	15 years; reduced to 10 years; released in 1951
	Werner Lorenz	Head of VoMi	Found guilty of all three counts	20 years; reduced to 15 years; released in 1954; died in 1974
	Heinz Brückner	Office head at VoMi	Found guilty of all three counts	15 years; reduced to 10 years; released in 1951; died in 1968
	Otto Hofmann	Head of RuSHA until April 20, 1943, later head of the SS in southwestern Germany	Found guilty of all three counts	25 years; reduced to 15 years; released in 1954; died in 1982
	Richard Hildebrandt	Head of RuSHA, Hofmann's successor	Found guilty of all three counts	25 years; turned over to Polish authorities and executed in 1951
	Fritz Schwalm	Chief of Staff of RuSHA and head of the "Immigration Office" (Einwandererzentrale, EWZ) in Łódź	Found guilty of all three counts	10 years; released in 1951; died in 1985
	Max Sollmann	Head of the Lebensborn society	Found guilty of count 3	Time already served (since July 6, 1945); released after the judgment; died in 1978
	Gregor Ebner	Head of Health Dept. of Lebensborn	Found guilty of count 3	Time already served (since July 5, 1945); released after the judgment; died in 1974
	Günther Tesch	Head of Legal Dept. of Lebensborn	Found guilty of count 3	Time already served (since May 13, 1945); released after the judgment; died in 1989
	Inge Viermetz	Deputy to Sollmann	Acquitted of counts 1 and 2	Acquitted; died in 1997

The four Lebensborn members were not found guilty on counts 1 and 2 of the indictment. The tribunal considered the Lebensborn society not responsible for the kidnapping of children, which was carried out by others.

Greifelt died in Landsberg Prison on February 6, 1949. Hildebrandt was turned over to Polish authorities. He was put on trial for different atrocities in Poland and sentenced to death. He was hanged on March 10, 1951. Hübner, Brückner, and Schwalm were released in 1951. Also in that year, the sentences of Hofmann and Lorenz were reduced to 15 years, and that of Creutz to 10 years. Hofmann was released in 1954.
