= Ulrich Greifelt =

German Nazi official, SS-Obergruppenführer

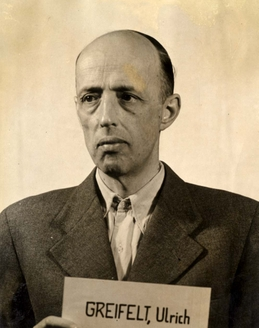
- Greifelt in custody, 1947
- Born: 8 December 1896; Berlin, Province of Brandenburg, Kingdom of Prussia, German Empire
- Died: 6 February 1949 (aged 52); Landsberg Prison, Landsberg am Lech, Allied-occupied Germany
- Political party: Nazi Party
- Status: Deceased
- Motive: Nazism
- Convictions: Crimes against humanity War crimes Membership in a criminal organization
- Trial: RuSHA trial
- Penalty: Life imprisonment
- SS career
- Allegiance: Nazi Germany
- Branch: Schutzstaffel; Allgemeine SS
- Service years: 1933–1945

Ulrich Heinrich Emil Richard Greifelt (8 December 1896 – 6 February 1949) was a German SS functionary and war criminal who served as Chief of Staff of the Reich Commission for the Consolidation of German Nationhood (RKFDV) from 1939 to 1945. Greifelt headed the RKFDV on behalf of the Reich Commissioner, SS chief Heinrich Himmler, and was responsible for forced Germanization of peoples in Central and Eastern Europe and the resettlement of ethnic Germans as part of Generalplan Ost. Greifelt was convicted of crimes against humanity at the RuSHA trial at Nuremberg in 1948, and sentenced to life imprisonment but died in prison less than a year later.

== Biography ==
Ulrich Heinrich Emil Richard Greifelt was born on 8 December 1896 in Berlin, the son of a pharmacist. He joined the Imperial German Army in 1914 and fought in the First World War. After the war, he retired from the army with the rank of Oberleutnant and subsequently joined the Freikorps. During the Weimar Republic, Greifelt worked as an economist at a Berlin joint-stock company until he was laid off in 1932 due to the difficult economic situation in Germany.

Greifelt joined the Nazi Party in April 1933 (membership no. 1,667,407) and the Schutzstaffel (SS) on 6 July 1933 as an Untersturmführer (member no. 72,909) after the Machtergreifung. By August 1933, he was a speaker on the Persönlicher Stab Reichsführer-SS. From early March to mid-June 1934, he was business leader for the chief of staff of SS-Oberabschnitts Mitte/Elbe, and then by mid-January 1935, chief of staff of SS-Oberabschnitt Rhein/Rhein-Westmark/Westmark. He then headed the Central Registry of the SS-Hauptamt.

In October 1939, after the beginning of the Second World War, Greifelt was appointed Chief of Staff of the Reich Commission for the Consolidation of German Nationhood (RKFDV), an office created for Reichsführer-SS Heinrich Himmler responsible for the return, repatriation, and settlement of ethnic Germans who lived abroad, into Nazi Germany and German held territories in Central and Eastern Europe. Greifelt's position as de facto chief of the RKFDV made him instrumental in the planning and implementation of population relocation in the context of Generalplan Ost. In the SS, Greifelt rose quickly through the ranks, reaching SS-Gruppenführer (major general) by 1941. He ultimately reached the rank of SS-Obergruppenführer und General der Polizei on 30 January 1944.

In February 1942, whilst serving on Himmler's staff, Greifelt wrote a directive for dealing with children in German-occupied Poland. He claimed that the Polish government had been responsible for seizing ethnic German children in Poland and placing them in orphanages, and it was the duty of the Nazis to reclaim these children. He continued that those who "looked" German should be taken from orphanages, taken for examination at the SS's Race and Settlement Main Office before undergoing extensive psychological study. Those that were found to be of desirable racial stock were to be sent to German boarding schools and subsequently made available for adoption by the families of SS members, with their Polish origin to be concealed from any prospective parents.

After World War II in Europe ended, Greifelt was arrested in May 1945 and tried at the RuSHA trial in Nuremberg in late 1947, where he was accused of being mainly responsible for the expulsion of people from Slovenia, Alsace, Lorraine and Luxembourg. Greifelt argued in his defence that he had the welfare of the people whom he expelled at heart and wanted to help them to find "the consolidation of their existence and thereby of their Germanism." His claims were rejected and Greifelt was sentenced under recently passed genocide legislation. Greifelt was sentenced to life imprisonment on 10 March 1948, being found guilty of war crimes, crimes against humanity, and membership of an illegal organization as an SS member. Greifelt died on 6 February 1949, less than a year later, while serving his sentence at Landsberg Prison in 1949.
