= Volksdeutsche Mittelstelle =

Agency of the Nazi Party

Coordination Center for Ethnic Germans
- Volksdeutsche Mittelstelle (VoMi)
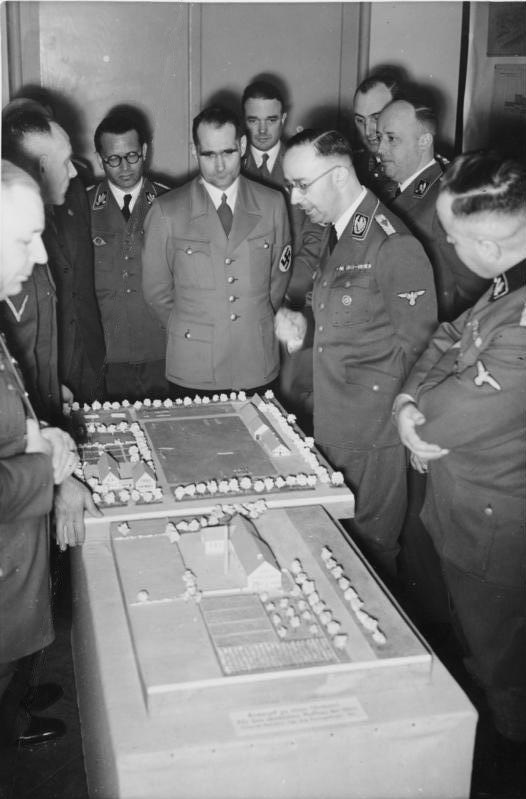
- Rudolf Hess and Heinrich Himmler visiting an exhibition of proposed rural German settlements within occupied Eastern Europe (March 1941)

Agency overview
- Formed: c.1937
- Preceding agencies: Volksdeutscher Rat (VR) – (Ethnic German Council) (1933–1935); Büro von Kursell
- Dissolved: May 8, 1945
- Superseding agency: Reichskommissar für die Festigung deutschen Volkstums (RKFDV)
- Jurisdiction: Germany; Occupied Europe
- Headquarters: Unter den Linden 64, Berlin; 52°31′1.03″N 13°23′0.28″E
- Employees: 5,000 c. January 1942
- Ministers responsible: NSDAP Reichsschatzmeister Franz Xaver Schwarz, (1937–1939); Reichsführer-SS Heinrich Himmler, (1939–1945)
- Agency executive: SS-Obergruppenführer Werner Lorenz, Chef für Volksdeutsche Mittelstelle (1937–1945)
- Parent agency: NSDAP; Allgemeine-SS

In Nazi Germany the Volksdeutsche Mittelstelle or VoMi (Coordination Center for Ethnic Germans) was a Nazi Party agency founded to manage the interests of the Volksdeutsche—the population of ethnic Germans living outside the Third Reich. Ultimately coming under Allgemeine-SS administration, it became responsible for orchestrating the implementation of Nazi Lebensraum (English: living-space) policies in Eastern Europe during World War II.

== Formation ==
It was founded in 1937 under the command of SS-Obergruppenführer Werner Lorenz as a state office of the Nazi Party. Its headquarters were on Unter den Linden, Berlin (this changed to Keithstraße in 1943 due to Allied Bombing). VoMi's primary task was the resettlement of German peoples outside Germany. Between 1939 and 1942, VoMi had resettled half a million ethnic Germans into the newly occupied territories of the Reich under the slogan "Heim ins Reich" (Home into the Empire). These territories included the Reichsgaue of the German Reich; these included Wartheland (Posen) and Danzig-West Prussia (Danzig).

== RKFDV ==
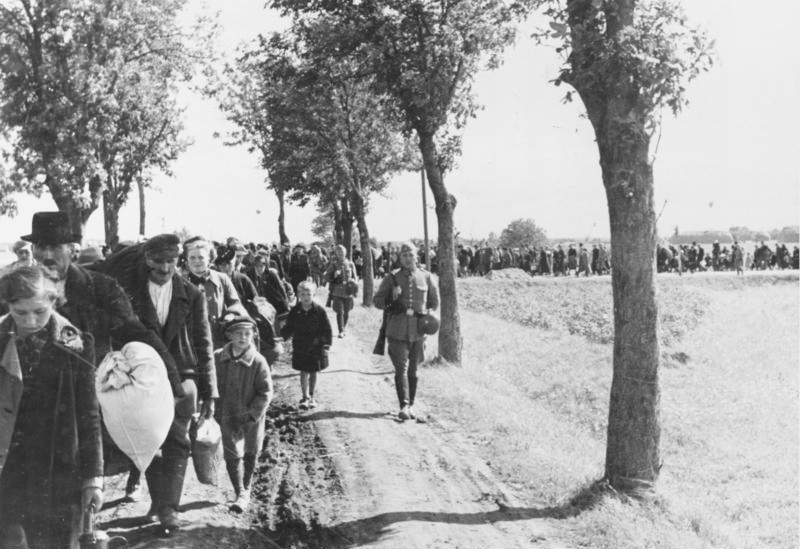
Poles being deported during the ethnic cleansing of Greater Poland after its immediate annexation by Nazi Germany following the invasion of 1939.

On October 7, 1939, two days after Poland had been overrun, Adolf Hitler appointed the Reichsführer-SS Heinrich Himmler to the new role of Reich Commissioner for the Consolidation of German Nationhood (German: Reichskommissariat für die Festigung deutschen Volkstums—RKFDV). This position authorized the SS to plan, initiate, and control the pace of Germanization, settlement and population transfer projects in occupied Poland, and later, after the invasion of the Soviet Union, in occupied Russia.

In 1941 the VoMi was upgraded to an SS Main Office (Hauptamt) with control over all VoMi personnel and field offices. In June 1941 VOMI was absorbed into the office of the Reich Commissioner for the Consolidation of German Nationhood (RKFDV) run by Himmler. The RKFDV, as an SS-controlled organization, had the authority to say who was German, where ethnic Germans could live, and what populations should be cleared or annihilated in order to make room for the German settlers. As RKFDV chief, Himmler authorized the SS-Einsatzgruppen (mobile death squads) and other SS police units to round up and kill Jews, Slavs and Roma.

In June 1942 Himmler put all VoMi personnel under the jurisdiction of the SS Police and Courts. With Hitler's blessing, Himmler now had complete control over VoMi, ethnic Germans outside Imperial Germany policy and living space programs. Although VoMi remained technically an office of the Nazi Party until the end of the Second World War, it was under the control of the SS.

== Organization ==
The RKFDV-VOMi was organized into 11 departments (1942):

=== Amt I: Führungsamt ===
("Headquarters") This department, unlike other VoMi Amts, contained only SS personnel. It contained SS legal officers and a Waffen-SS unit.

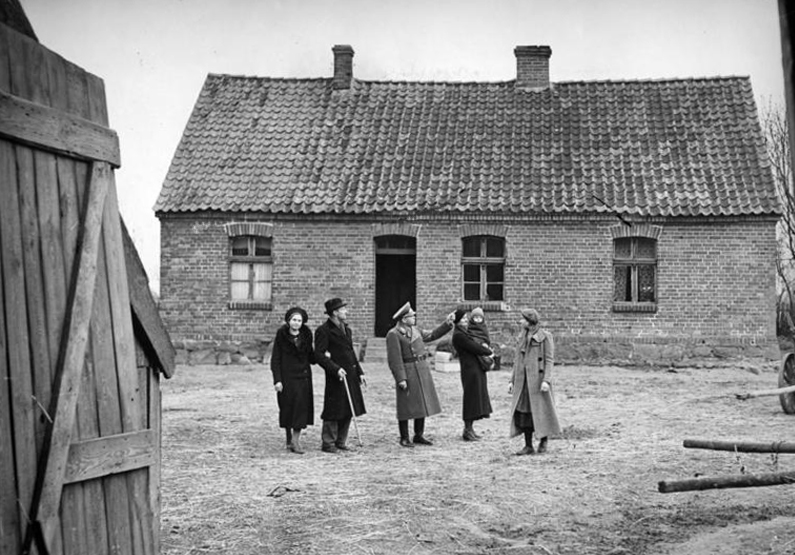
German settlers are shown around their Nazi-appropriated farmhouse in occupied Poland in November 1939 during action "Heim ins Reich"

=== Amt II: Organisation und Personal ===
("Organization and Personnel") This was managed by an SD officer. It dealt with SS and non-SS personnel within the Volksdeutsche. In the later period of the war, Amt II's importance increased as it was responsible for allocating Volksdeutsche to the Reich Labor Service.

=== Amt III: Finanzen, Wirtschaft und Vermögensverwaltung ===
("Finances, Economics and Administration") It was responsible for financing VoMi projects and distributing funds to Volksdeutsche. It was the only department that remained under complete control of the Nazi State and not the Allgemeine SS.

=== Amt IV: Informationen ===
("Information") This department documented and reported all VoMi activity and resettlement projects. It worked closely with Joseph Goebbels' Ministry of Information. Amt IV also published information journals for the German settlers.

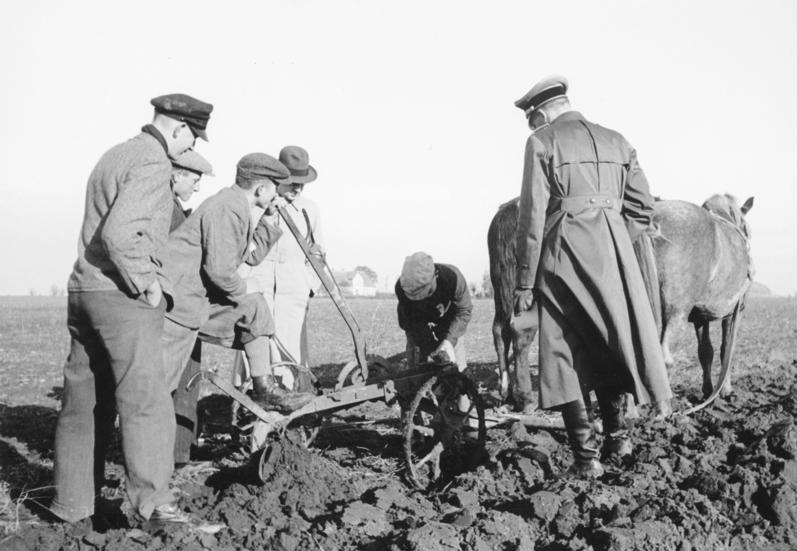
Volksdeutsche who had been resettled in the Wartheland by VoMi receive agriculture training in 1940.

=== Amt V: Deutschtumserziehung ===
("Germanness education") This provided cultural and educational services to help Volksdeutsche assimilate to German ways.

=== Amt VI: Sicherung Deutschen Volkstums im Reich ===
("Office of ethnic Germans within the Reich") This office looked after the welfare of ethnic Germans that had been allowed to settle within the borders of Germany. It also assessed potential candidates for settlement grading them on their ethnicity, politics and skills. However, Amt VI, although tasked with the welfare of Volksdeutsche, worked closely with the Gestapo and the SD of the RSHA.

=== Amt VII: Sicherung Deutschen Volkstums in den neuen Ostgebieten ===
("Office of ethnic Germans in the new eastern areas") It had a similar role as Amt VI but looked after the welfare of ethnic Germans in Eastern Europe, such as in occupied Poland, Czechoslovakia and Russia. It had field offices in Kraków, Riga and Kiev.

=== Amt VIII: Kultur und Wissenschaft ===
("Culture and science") This section was engaged in collating and archiving the cultural history of resettled Volksdeutsche. The department also acted as a curator for artifacts, treasure and documents belonging to ethnic Germans.

=== Amt IX: Politische Führung Deutscher Volksgruppen ===
("Political office of German ethnic groups") The SS considered this to be the most important department within VoMi as it provided the political leadership for ethnic Germans within the Third Reich and occupied Europe. Amt IX had several sub divisions, these included domestic affairs, relations between ethnic Germans and the Nazi Party, affairs between foreign states and the Third Reich regarding ethnic Germans and liaisons with the Nazi Foreign Ministry.

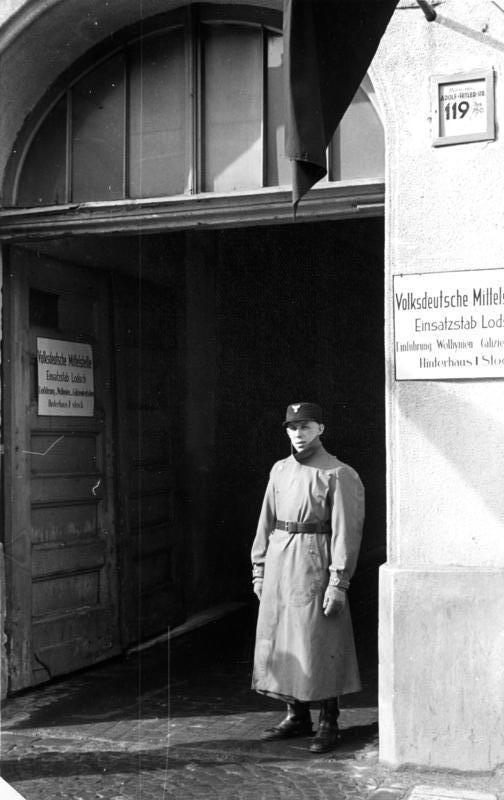
The SS Ethnic Germans Welfare Office in Lodz, Poland, occupied Poland in 1940. On September 26, 1942, August Frank, an official of the SS concentration camp administration department directed that all property of the Jews murdered in Aktion Reinhard be sent to this office.

=== Amt X: Führung der Wirtschaft in den Deutschen Volksgruppen ===
("Office managing the economics of ethnic Germans") This office established agriculture, work projects, banking and credit for the Volksdeutsche. During the Second World War its main role was the exploitation of the ethnic Germans in the interest of the Third Reich.

=== Amt XI: Umsiedlung ===
("Resettlement") This department was primarily responsible for handling the massive germanisation operation to settle Volksdeutsche throughout Germany and Occupied Europe.

== Role in the Holocaust ==
A VoMi unit, Sonderkommando R (Russland), institutional successor to Einsatzgruppe D in the Transnistria area, carried out numerous massacres of Jews during the first half of 1942. The victims were deportees from Rumanian-controlled territory, it being Marshal Ion Antonescu's policy to racially "cleanse" the Rumanian nation. His preferred technique was to expel them to German-controlled territory and have the responsible SS/ Police units exterminate them. Many of these Jews were passed back and forth for weeks before a mix of Sk-R units and ethnic German Selbstschutz militia killed them.

Most of these murders occurred in the county (Judetul) of Berezovca, where ethnic Germans, distributed among 40 or so villages, made up 40% of the population. Sk-R was commanded by SS-Standartenfuher Horst Hoffmeyer, a senior VoMi officer. His HQ was in Landau, located west of the River Bug. Apparently, the unit was divided into seven local offices, three of which were:

- Worms - commanded by SS-Obersturmführer Streit
- Lichtenfeld - SS-Obersturmführer Franz Liebl
- Rastatt - SS-Hauptsturmführer Rudolf Hartung

Liebl's unit was responsible for the massacre of 1,200 Jews at Suha Verba in early June 1942.

Slightly more detail on this can be found in Andrej Angrick's paper in Yad Vashem Studies XXVI (1998), pp 232–234. Perhaps oddly, Radu Ioanid's The Holocaust in Romania: The Destruction of Jews and Gypsies Under the Antonescu Regime, 1940-1944 does not cover Sk-R, nor does Valdis O. Lumen's book dedicated to VoMi.

SS-Obergruppenführer August Frank was an official of the SS-Wirtschafts- und Verwaltungshauptamt (SS Main Economic and Administrative Office), which was responsible for the administration of the Nazi concentration camps. Frank was responsible for taking the property from Jews murdered in Aktion Reinhard in 1942. After the war, a memorandum prepared by Frank on September 26, 1942, detailed instructions on dealing with this ill-gotten wealth; which even included collecting the underwear of victims. It ordered that the property should be sent to the VoMi offices in Łódź, Poland. The memorandum refuted claims that organizations like VoMi had no knowledge that Jews were being murdered en masse in the extermination camps. The note is an example of the use of the Nazi euphemism "evacuation" for Jews that were being murdered in The Holocaust.

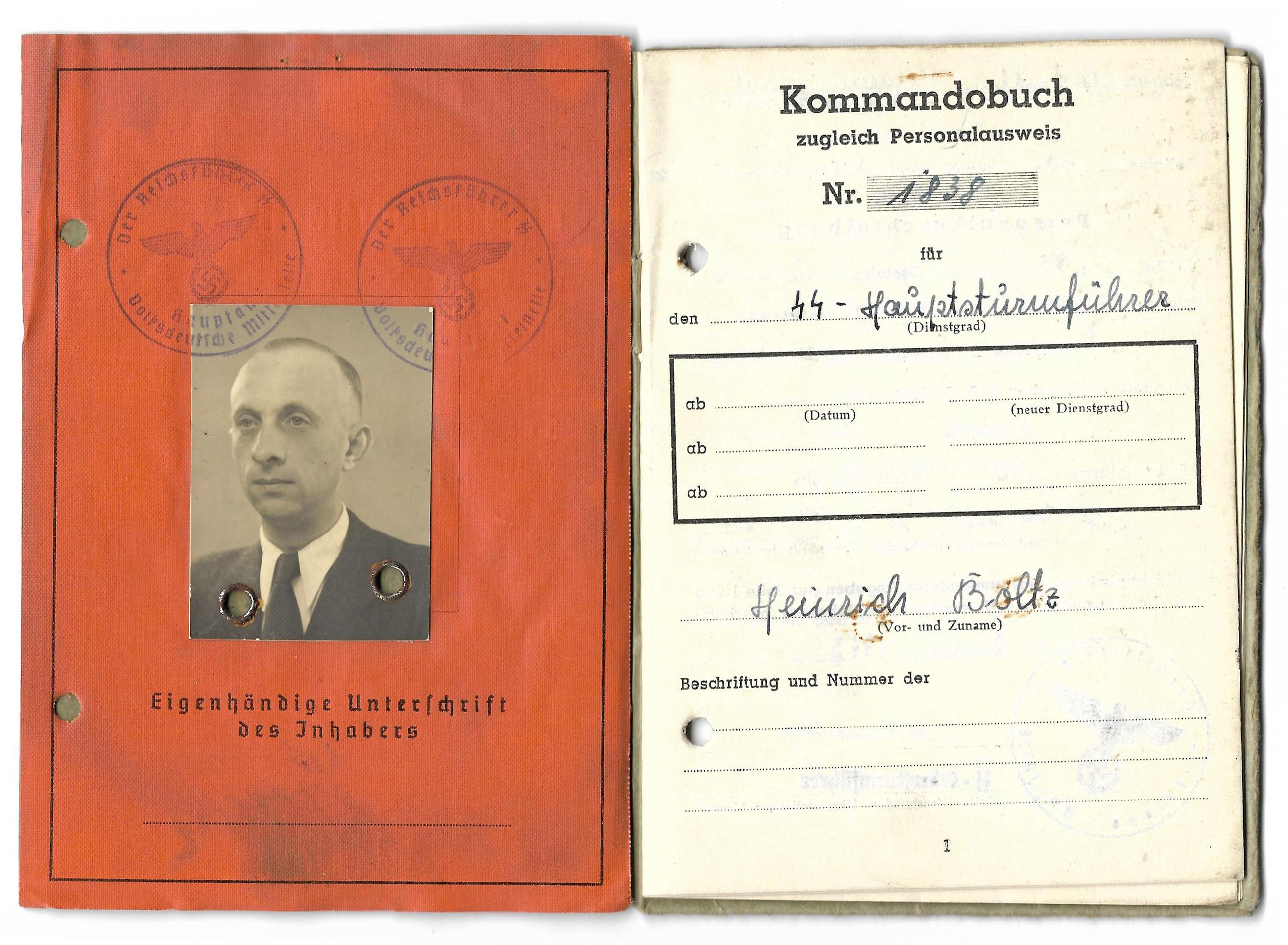
Kommandobuch issued to the members of the SS VoMi serving in Transnistria.

== See also ==
- Rassenpolitisches Amt, NSDAP office founded in 1933 and tasked with creating and formulating the Third Reich's racial policy.
- RuSHA, SS organization that enforced Aryan ideology, oversaw marriage licenses and child-breeding programs.
- Generalplan Ost, the destruction of Slavic peoples and the germanization of Eastern Europe.
