= Reich Commissioner for the Consolidation of German Nationhood =

Office in Nazi Germany

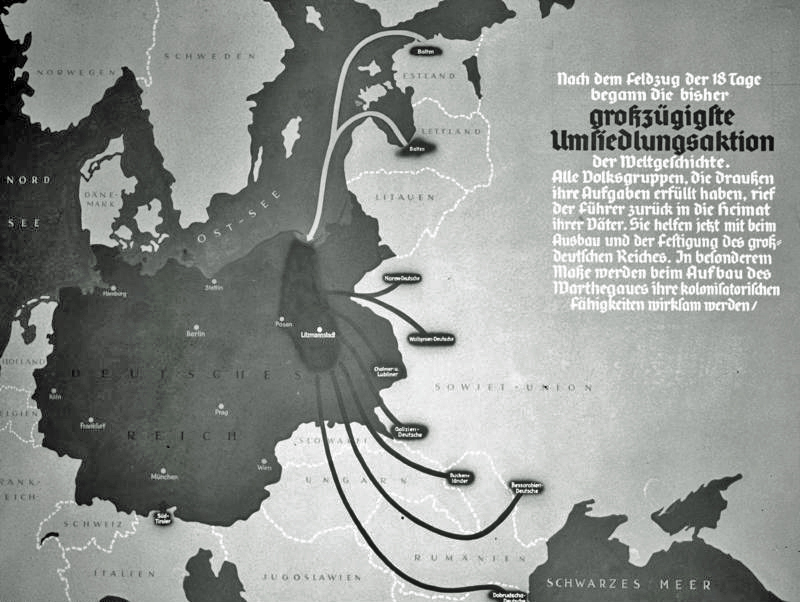
A propaganda poster for German relocation from around the world to populate Reichsgau Wartheland

The Reich Commissioner for the Consolidation of German Nationhood (German: Reichskommissar für die Festigung deutschen Volkstums, RKF, RKFDV) was an office of the Schutzstaffel in Nazi Germany, held by Reichsführer-SS Heinrich Himmler, responsible for the return and resettlement of the German diaspora.

Adolf Hitler in his 7 October 1939 order Erlaß des Führers und Reichskanzlers zur Festigung deutschen Volkstums appointed Himmler to carry out the following duties:

- Overseeing of the final return to the Reich of the Volksdeutsche and Auslandsdeutsche (Reichsdeutsche who live abroad)
- Prevention of "harmful influence" of populations alien to the German Volkstum
- Creation of new populated areas settled by Germans, mostly by the returning ones.

The commissioner was therefore responsible for the return, repatriation, and settlement of ethnic Germans who lived abroad, into Nazi Germany and German held territories.

The RKFDV was heavily involved in Generalplan Ost, the Nazi plan for the resettlement and "Germanization" of captured territory in Eastern Europe, producing four of the plan's five drafts.

Ulrich Greifelt served as Chief of Staff for the RKFDV during its existence, and was responsible for much of its day-to-day operation and policy on behalf of Himmler.

== See also ==
- Generalplan Ost
- Heim ins Reich
- Lebensraum
