= Joseph Wirth =

Chancellor of Germany from 1921 to 1922

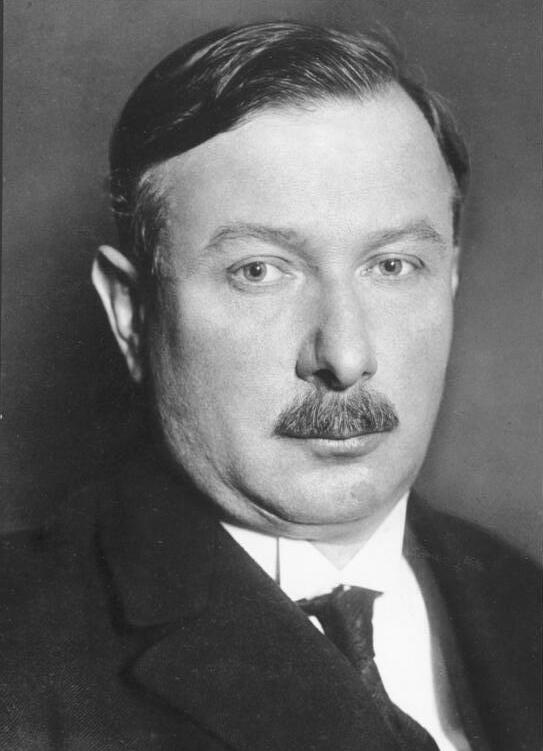
- Wirth c. 1920

Chancellor of Germany (Weimar Republic)
- In office 10 May 1921 – 22 November 1922
- President: Friedrich Ebert
- Deputy: Gustav Bauer
- Preceded by: Constantin Fehrenbach
- Succeeded by: Wilhelm Cuno

Foreign Minister
- Acting; 26 October 1921 – 31 January 1922
- Chancellor: Joseph Wirth
- Preceded by: Friedrich Rosen
- Succeeded by: Walther Rathenau
- Acting; 24 June 1922 – 22 November 1922
- President: Friedrich Ebert
- Chancellor: Joseph Wirth
- Preceded by: Walther Rathenau
- Succeeded by: Hans von Rosenberg

Minister of Finance
- In office 27 March 1920 – 22 October 1921
- Chancellor: Hermann Müller; Constantin Fehrenbach; Joseph Wirth
- Preceded by: Matthias Erzberger
- Succeeded by: Andreas Hermes

Minister of the Interior
- In office 30 March 1930 – 7 October 1931
- Chancellor: Heinrich Brüning
- Preceded by: Carl Severing
- Succeeded by: Wilhelm Groener

Minister for the Occupied Territories
- In office 13 April 1929 – 27 March 1930
- Chancellor: Hermann Müller
- Preceded by: Carl Severing
- Succeeded by: Gottfried Treviranus

Member of the Reichstag (Weimar Republic)
- In office 6 June 1920 – 23 March 1933
- Constituency: National list (1932–1933); Liegnitz (1930–1932); National list (1928–1930); Baden (1920–1928)

(German Empire)
- In office 15 February 1914 – 9 November 1918
- Constituency: Baden 7

Member of the Weimar National Assembly
- In office 6 February 1919 – 21 May 1920
- Constituency: Baden

Personal details
- Born: Karl Joseph Wirth; 6 September 1879 Freiburg im Breisgau, Germany
- Died: 3 January 1956 (aged 76) Freiburg im Breisgau, West Germany
- Party: Centre Party (1911–1933); CDU (1948–1953); BdD (1953–1956)

Karl Joseph Wirth (German pronunciation: [kaʁl ˈjoːzɛf ˈvɪʁt]; 6 September 1879 – 3 January 1956) was a German politician of the Catholic Centre Party who was chancellor of Germany from May 1921 to November 1922, during the early years of the Weimar Republic. He was also minister of four government departments between 1920 and 1931 (Foreign Affairs, Finance, Interior, and Occupied Territories). Wirth was strongly influenced by Christian social teaching throughout his political career.

He was named chancellor in May 1921 when Germany was facing difficult negotiations with the Allies of World War I over German war reparations. Wirth accepted the Allies' conditions and began a policy of fulfilment – an attempt to show that Germany was unable to afford the reparations payments by making the effort to meet them. He resigned after less than six months in protest against the partition of Upper Silesia by the League of Nations and formed a second, minority cabinet a few days later. Following the assassination of Foreign Minister Walther Rathenau by members of a right-wing terrorist group in April 1922, his government attempted to confront political violence with the Law for the Protection of the Republic. Wirth's second government resigned after just over a year when it was unable to expand its political base.

After his two terms as chancellor, Wirth continued to fight right-wing political forces as a Reichstag member and government minister. During the Nazi era, he went into exile and worked with several anti-Nazi groups. Following the end of World War II, he opposed Konrad Adenauer's policy of integration with the West. Although he lived in West Germany, he had contacts with the Soviet Union and East Germany, the latter of which awarded him two prestigious honours. He died in his hometown of Freiburg in 1956.

== Early life ==
Karl Joseph Wirth was born on 6 September 1879 in Freiburg im Breisgau in what was then the Grand Duchy of Baden, a federal state of the German Empire. He was the son of Karl Wirth, a master machinist at a printing company, and his wife Agathe (née Zeller). The involvement of his parents, who were Catholic, in Christian and social causes had a strong influence on him throughout his life.

From 1899 to 1906, he studied mathematics, natural sciences and economics at the University of Freiburg. He obtained his doctorate in mathematics in 1906 with the thesis "On the elementary divisors of a linear homogeneous substitution". From 1906 to 1913, he taught mathematics at a Realgymnasium (secondary school) in Freiburg. In 1909, he was a co-founder and first president of the Akademische Vinzenzkonferenz (Society of Saint Vincent de Paul), a charity run by laymen for the poor. Social issues were consistently his main concern after he entered politics.

=== Start of political career ===
In 1911, Wirth was elected to the Freiburg city council for the Catholic Centre Party. From 1913 to 1921, he was a member of the Baden Landtag, the lower house of parliament of the Grand Duchy (after 1918 the Republic) of Baden. In 1914 he became a member of the Imperial Reichstag following a difficult campaign against a National Liberal candidate who was in part responsible for Wirth's life-long dislike of the "parties of property and education".

At the start of World War I, Wirth volunteered for military service but, for health reasons, was deemed unfit. He then volunteered with the Red Cross and served on both the Western and Eastern Fronts until 1917, when he left after contracting pneumonia.

Wirth voted for the July 1917 Reichstag Peace Resolution, which was sponsored by Matthias Erzberger, also of the Centre Party, and called for a negotiated peace without annexations. In the final year of the war, Wirth increasingly often criticised the policies of the imperial government and pushed for internal reforms.

== Revolution and Weimar Republic ==
In the first days of the German revolution of 1918–1919, after Baden's provisional government had replaced the Grand Duke's ministers, Wirth became Finance Minister of Baden. The peaceful course of the revolution there made it possible for the Centre Party to work with the moderate Majority Social Democratic Party (MSPD). Wirth engaged with Catholic workers to keep them from becoming radicalised and spoke in favour of a leading role for the Centre Party in building a democratic Germany. His position reflected his beliefs in Catholicism's social teaching and in Christian democracy.

In January 1919, Wirth was elected to both the Baden Constituent Assembly and the Weimar National Assembly, which wrote the new constitutions for the Republic of Baden and the Weimar Republic. After the Kapp Putsch of March 1920, when Chancellor Gustav Bauer of the MSPD resigned and was replaced by Hermann Müller (MSPD), Wirth became Germany's minister of Finance. He continued to hold the portfolio in the subsequent cabinet of Constantin Fehrenbach (Centre Party).

As Finance Minister, Wirth continued the policies of his predecessor, Matthias Erzberger (Centre). They included the centralisation at the national level of the authority to tax and spend and the redistribution of taxes to lighten the burden on those with low to moderate incomes. Through ties with military leadership, he also saw that funds were provided to help begin secretly rearming Germany in contravention of the restrictions imposed by the Treaty of Versailles.

== Chancellorships ==
The Fehrenbach cabinet resigned on 4 May 1921 when it was unable to reach a decision on whether to accept the London Schedule of Payments, which set German war reparations at 132 billion gold marks. The London ultimatum issued on 5 May threatened an Allied occupation of the Ruhr if Germany did not accept the terms within six days. The Centre and SPD were in favour of accepting the London Schedule in spite of the anger it had aroused in the German public. Since Wirth was the only candidate for chancellor whom the SPD would accept, and no government could be built without them, Wirth and the Centre Party formed a coalition on 10 May with the SPD and the German Democratic Party (DDP). Wirth remained Finance minister in his new cabinet.

=== First term ===
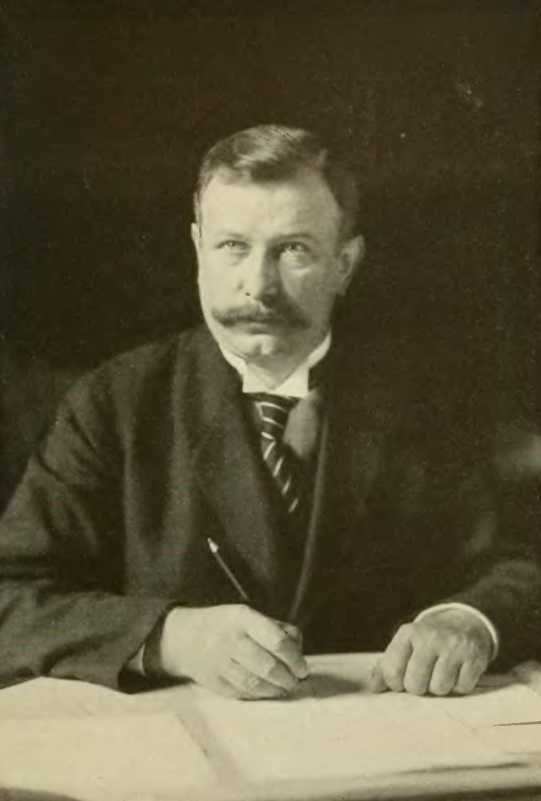
Joseph Wirth in 1922

The Reichstag ratified the London Schedule the following day, 11 May 1921, and Wirth began his "fulfilment policy" (Erfüllungspolitik). By attempting to comply with the Allied demands – and thus prevent them from occupying the Ruhr – Wirth wanted to show that the annual payments of three billion gold marks were beyond Germany's means. On 31 August 1921, after considerable effort, Germany was able to pay the first half-yearly instalment. During the period of relaxed diplomatic relations that surrounded the payment, the U.S.–German Peace Treaty was signed, and Walther Rathenau, then minister of Reconstruction, concluded a comprehensive agreement with France for paying reparations in kind for the reconstruction of the devastated regions of the country. The fulfilment policy was quickly broken off due to the problems of financing it. In December 1921, Germany had to request a postponement of the next payment. The extreme Right reacted to Wirth's reparations policy by calling for his assassination.

Two members of the right-wing terrorist group Organisation Consul assassinated Matthias Erzberger on 26 August 1921 for his role in signing the Armistice of 11 November. At about the same time, the conflict between the Berlin government and the Bavarian government of Gustav Ritter von Kahr came to a head when President Friedrich Ebert placed Bavaria under a state of emergency. The Reich government was then able to disarm the paramilitary Bavarian Citizens' Defense groups (Einwohnerwehr), and Kahr, without their armed support, stepped down as Bavarian minister president.

The strife which arose out of the crisis in Bavaria had only just abated when in mid-October the League of Nations' announcement of the partition of Upper Silesia between Germany and Poland aroused considerable anger throughout Germany. Almost sixty per cent of the vote in the March 1921 plebiscite in ethnically mixed Upper Silesia was in favour of staying part of Germany, but the heavily industrialised eastern part of the region was nevertheless awarded to Poland. Wirth believed that its severance from Germany would fatally affect Germany's capacity to pay its reparations.

On 22 October 1921, he resigned in protest over the partition. Three days later, President Friedrich Ebert once again asked him to form a government, which Wirth did on 26 October with the second Wirth cabinet. Because the DDP and German People's Party (DVP) had refused to accept the partition of Silesia or join any coalition that agreed to it, the SPD and Centre Party formed a minority government. On 26 October, Wirth gave a government statement in which he presented his new cabinet as a combination of trusted individuals, not as members of a coalition.

=== Second term ===
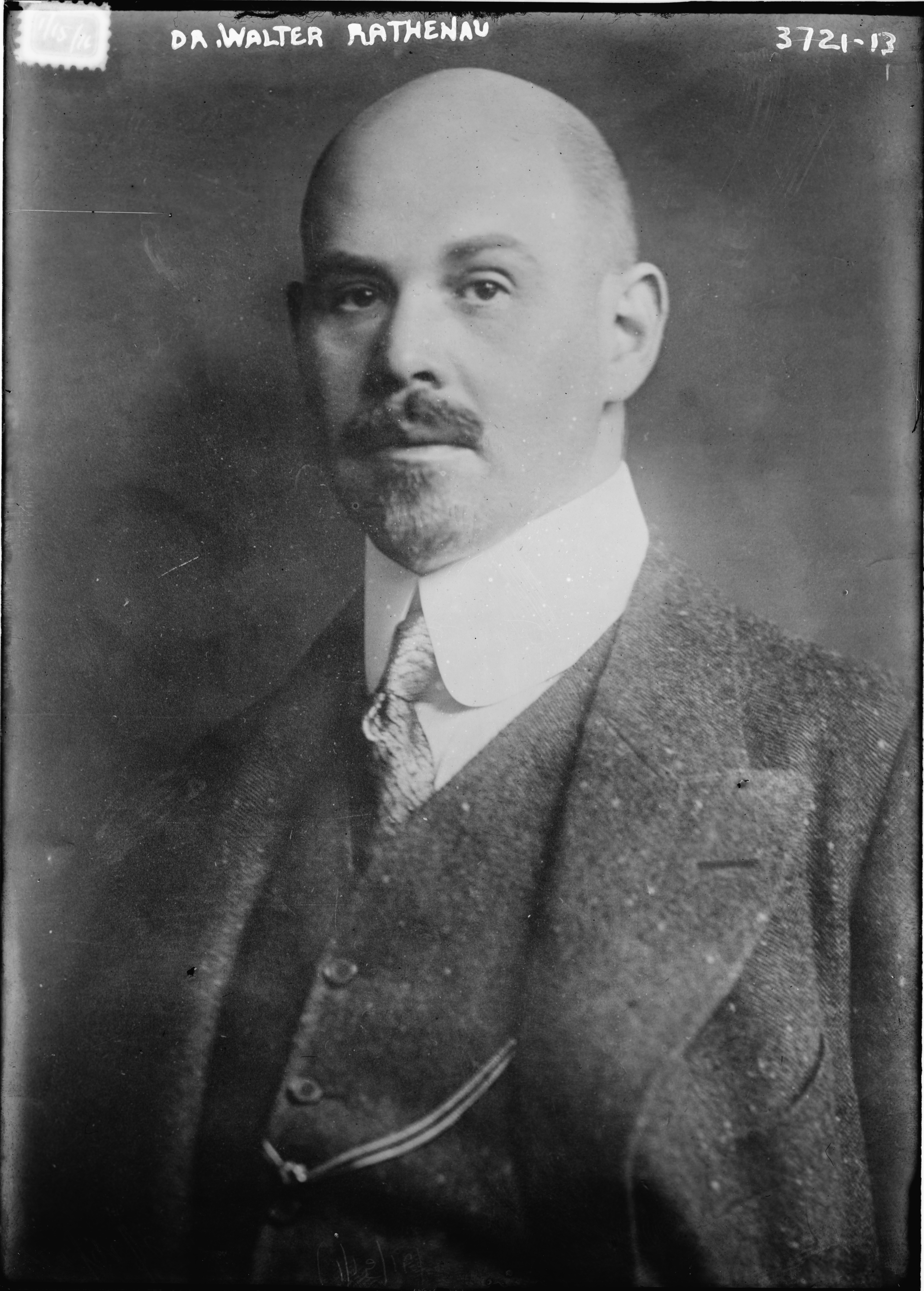
Walther Rathenau, foreign minister in the second Wirth cabinet, was assassinated by far-right extremists on 24 June 1922.

On 16 April 1922, Wirth and Walther Rathenau signed the Treaty of Rapallo, under which Germany and Soviet Russia renounced all war-related territorial and financial claims against each other and opened friendly diplomatic relations, a move which ended Germany's post-war foreign policy isolation. After Rathenau was assassinated by far-right extremists of the Organisation Consul on 24 June 1922, Wirth gave a speech in front of the Reichstag in which he warned that "we are experiencing in Germany a political brutalisation" that was characterized by "an atmosphere of murder, of rancour, of poison," and famously proclaimed:

There stands the enemy, who drips his poison into the wounds of a people. There stands the enemy, and about it there is no doubt: the enemy is on the Right!

On 21 July 1922, the Reichstag passed the Law for the Protection of the Republic on the initiative of the Wirth government. It increased the penalties for political assassinations and banned organisations opposed to the "constitutional republican form of government" along with their printed matter and meetings.

Wirth tried to extend his government's minority coalition to the right to include the DVP, but even his own Centre Party was becoming increasingly unhappy at having to work with the SPD, which had reunited with the more radical Independent Social Democrats (USPD) in September 1922. After the government lost a key vote on the grain levy in November, the government resigned. On 22 November, Wilhelm Cuno, a political independent, replaced Wirth as chancellor.

== Post-chancellorship ==
In 1924, Wirth joined the Reichsbanner Schwarz-Rot-Gold, a paramilitary organisation formed by the SPD, Centre and DDP for the non-violent protection of the Republic from the enemies of democracy. Wirth used its rallies to speak in opposition to the Centre Party's drift to the right. When it joined the government of the independent Hans Luther in January 1925, Wirth criticized it for working with the nationalist German National People's Party (DNVP) in the Luther cabinet. He left the Centre's Reichstag contingent in protest against the party's social policies in August 1925 but returned in July 1926. In August of that year, Wirth, Paul Löbe of the SPD and Ludwig Haas of the Baden DDP formed a Republican Union as a way to maintain cooperation between representatives of the working class and those of the progressive middle class. The Centre Party then removed Wirth's name from the list of candidates for the 1928 Reichstag election. Wirth had to submit to a number of conditions before his name was restored.

In April 1929, Wirth became minister for the Occupied Territories (the Rhineland region occupied by the Allies) in the second Müller cabinet. After the government's resignation in late March 1930, Wirth became minister of the Interior in the cabinet of Heinrich Brüning, the first of the presidential cabinets. Wirth's main task at the Interior Ministry was to try to hold back the growing power of the Nazis. He was highly popular with the Social Democrats and acted as mediator between them and the new government. In October 1931, he was pushed out of office and replaced by Wilhelm Groener on the personal initiative of President Paul von Hindenburg, who regarded Wirth as a leftist.

=== Nazi era ===
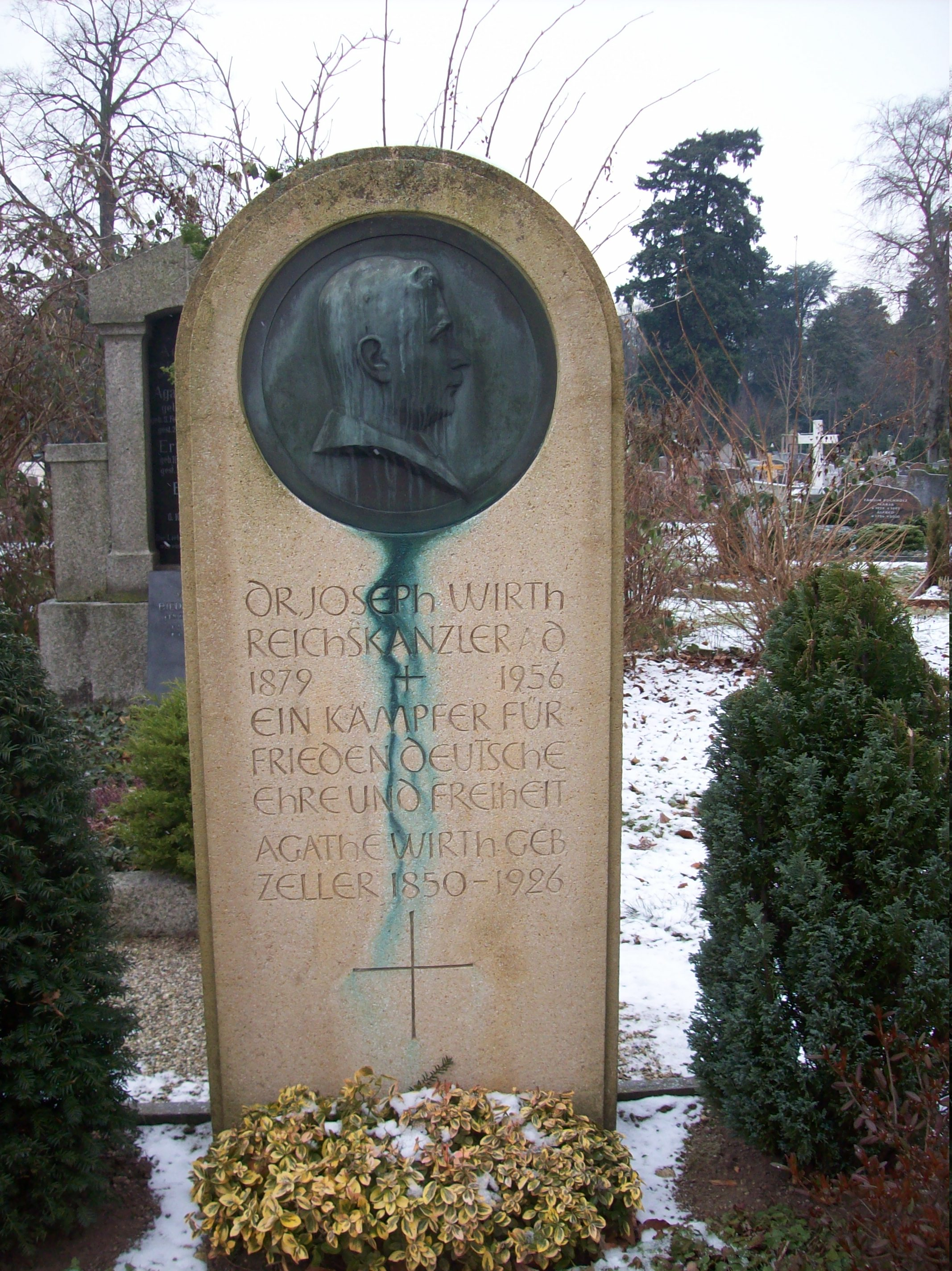
Wirth's grave in Freiburg

In March 1933, two months after Adolf Hitler was appointed chancellor by Hindenburg, Wirth spoke passionately in the Reichstag against the Nazi-sponsored Enabling Act, which gave Hitler dictatorial powers. Bowing to the pressure of party unity, he nevertheless voted in favour of the Act with the rest of the Centre parliamentary contingent on 24 March. After its passage, Wirth emigrated to Switzerland, settling in Lucerne and purchasing a villa there. He communicated with leading statesmen in Britain and France about the dangers of Nazism and travelled to the United States, where he met with the exiled former chancellor Heinrich Brüning and gave lectures on the Nazi regime at Harvard University and Princeton University. Wirth lived in Paris from 1935 to 1939, after which he returned to Lucerne. In the early days of World War II, he worked with the British government and an anti-Nazi group around Admiral Wilhelm Canaris on a possible coup and peace settlement, but the talks ended when Germany invaded France in 1940. Subsequently, he made efforts to inform the Vatican about the threat of Nazi Germany's anti-Jewish policies, and during World War II, he secretly kept in touch with anti-Nazi Solf Circle and Kreisau Circle in Germany. He was also one of the founders of "Democratic Germany" (Das Demokratische Deutschland), a working group with SPD members in exile. It drew up guidelines for the re-establishment of a democratic Germany that they hoped would avoid the mistakes that had brought down the Weimar Republic.

=== Later life ===
Wirth returned from exile to Freiburg in 1948. He opposed Konrad Adenauer's policy of integration with the West for fear of making the division of Germany permanent. Together with Wilhelm Elfes, he founded the neutralist "Alliance of Germans, Party for Unity, Peace and Freedom" (BdD) in 1953. The party was supported by the SED, the ruling communist party in East Germany. Although Wirth did not approve of Stalin's policies, he believed in a compromise with Soviet Russia in line with the Rapallo Treaty. In 1951, Wirth visited Moscow for political talks.

Unlike West Germany, East Germany paid Wirth a small amount of financial aid. In 1954, he was awarded the East German "Peace Medal" and received the Stalin Peace Prize in 1955. The CIA file "The background of Joseph Wirth" states that Wirth was a Soviet agent. According to a CIA document, Wirth claimed that he met with Lavrentiy Beria, chief of the Soviet secret police, in Berlin in December 1952. Wirth said Beria asked him to join the East German government.

Wirth died of heart failure in 1956, aged 76, in his hometown of Freiburg and was buried in the city's main cemetery.

== Bibliography ==
- Chisholm, Hugh, ed. (1922). "Wirth, Karl Joseph" . Encyclopædia Britannica (12th ed.). London & New York: The Encyclopædia Britannica Company.
- KNAPP, THOMAS A. “THE GERMAN CENTER PARTY AND THE REICHSBANNER: A CASE STUDY IN POLITICAL AND SOCIAL CONSENSUS IN THE WEIMAR REPUBLIC.” International Review of Social History 14, no. 2 (1969): pp. 159–179. .

Political offices
Preceded by Konstantin Fehrenbach	Chancellor of Germany; 10 May 1921 – 14 November 1922	Succeeded by Wilhelm Cuno
Preceded by Friedrich Rosen	Minister of Foreign Affairs (acting); 26 October 1921 – 31 January 1922	Succeeded by Walther Rathenau
Preceded by Walther Rathenau	Minister of Foreign Affairs (acting); 24 June 1922 – 14 November 1922	Succeeded by Hans von Rosenberg
Preceded by Carl Severing	Minister of the Interior; 30 March 1930 – 7 October 1931	Succeeded by Wilhelm Groener
