= Roter Ochse =

Prison and memorial in Saxony-Anhalt

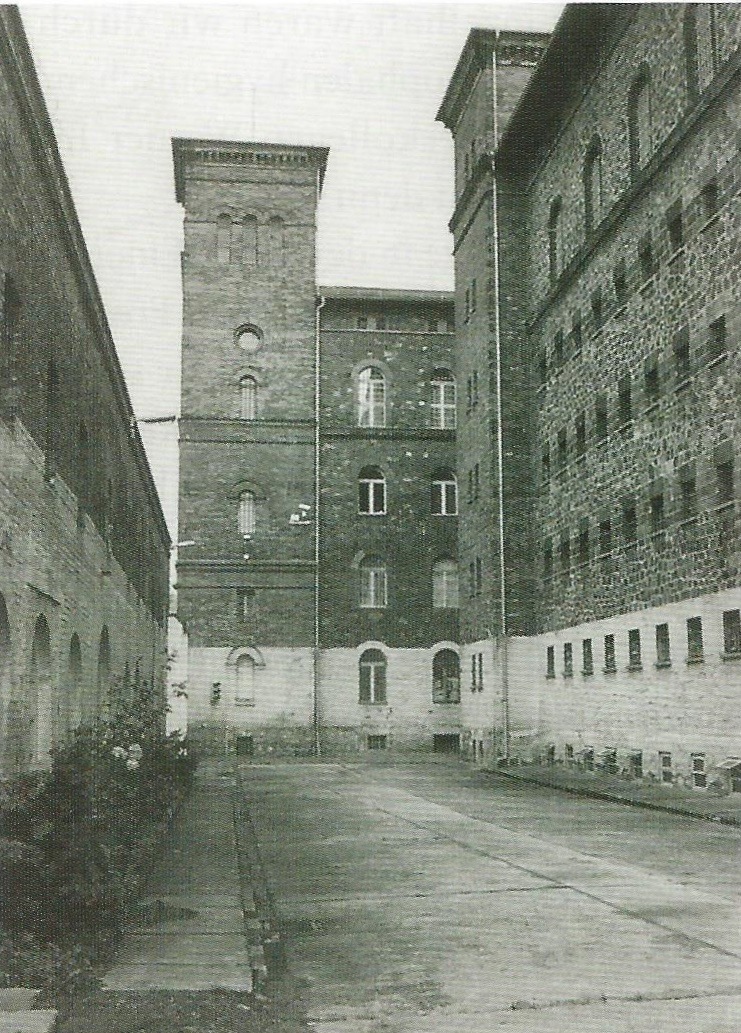
- Roter Ochse in 1990
- Interactive map of the Roter Ochse area
- Alternative names: JVA Halle I

General information
- Type: Prison, Memorial
- Architectural style: 19th-century
- Location: Halle (Saale), Germany
- Completed: 19th century (original construction)
- Opened: 1885 (as a prison)

Design and construction
- Known for: Historical significance as a prison and memorial

Roter Ochse ("The Red Ox", today JVA Halle I) is a prison in Halle (Saale). The name can be traced to the end of the nineteenth century, but its origin is unclear. It is said to be related to the colour of the masonry. Since 1996 the building has also been used as a memorial.

== History ==
=== Prussia ===
After six years of construction, the prison went into operation as "The Royal Prussian Penal, Learning, and Correctional Institution" (Königlich-Preußische Straf-, Lern- und Besserungsanstalt). On February 7, 1885, the anarchists August Reinsdorf and Emil Küchler were executed in the courtyard. They had attempted to assassinate Kaiser Wilhelm I at the Niederwalddenkmal on September 28, 1883.

In the First World War, from February to August 1917, Werner Scholem, a soldier and later member of the Reichstag in the KPD, was interned in Halle, having been sentenced to ten months in prison for joining an anti-war demonstration in uniform in January 1917. He served the last months of his sentence in Spandau Prison. The prison held many left-wing political prisoners who had been involved in uprisings after the war, but Ernst Werner Techow, a right-wing extremist who had been implicated in the murder of Walther Rathenau in 1922, was also interned there.

=== Germany under National Socialism ===
In the early years of the Nazi regime, from 1933 to 1935, the prison was used for "protective custody". From 1935 it was mainly used as a penitentiary for political prisoners. Following a March 19, 1939 directive from the Ministry of Justice, it was used as a central execution site. By the end of the war, 549 prisoners had been killed by guillotine or hanging.

The bodies of executed prisoners may have been used for scientific research. At the request of physiologist Gotthilft von Studnitz, at least 35 prisoners' eyes were removed immediately after their death for research into night vision.

=== Soviet Occupation Zone and the German Democratic Republic ===
The prison was liberated by the 104th Infantry Division in April 1945. The US Army withdrew from Halle a few weeks after the war. From July 1945, the Soviet occupation forces used the prison as a detention and internment camp for the NKVD. Until 1950, soviet military trials against thousands of prisoners from across Saxony-Anhalt were held at Roter Ochse. After that, use of the facility was shared by the Ministry of the Interior and the Ministry for State Security (Stasi) of East Germany. In addition to its use as a corrections facility with space for 470 female prisoners, Roter Ochse was used by the Stasi from 1952 onward as a pre-trial detention facility. During the uprising of 1953, doctoral student Gerhard Schmidt was shot dead by the police in front of the prison.

Roter Ochse was the office of Stasi departments VIII (observation and investigation), IX (investigations), and XIV (pre-trial and penal detention), and working-group XXII (counter-terrorism), for the district of Halle. Almost 10,000 people were interned by the Stasi at Roter Ochse.

=== Federal Republic of Germany ===
Roter Ochse is now a correctional facility (JVA Halle I).

== Memorial ==
Since February 15, 1996, there has been a memorial for victims of political persecution from 1933 to 1945 and 1945–1989 in Roter Ochse, in the former Nazi execution building, which had been converted into an interrogation facility by the Stasi. The memorial is intended as a place for education and research as well as a place of mourning, remembrance, and commemoration.

== Sources ==
- Fricke, Kurt. 1997. Die Justizvollzugsanstalt „Roter Ochse“ Halle/Saale 1933–1945. Eine Dokumentation. Magdeburg: Ministerium des Innern des Landes Sachsen-Anhalt, Magdeburg (Gedenkstätten und Gedenkstättenarbeit im Land Sachsen-Anhalt 3).
- Viebig, Michael. 1998. Das Zuchthaus Halle/Saale als Richtstätte der nationalsozialistischen Justiz (1942 bis 1945). Magdeburg: Ministerium des Innern des Landes Sachsen-Anhalt.
- Sperk, Alexander. 1998. Die MfS-Untersuchungshaftanstalt „Roter Ochse“ Halle/Saale von 1950 bis 1989. Eine Dokumentation. Magdeburg: Ministerium des Innern des Landes Sachsen-Anhalt.
- Fricke, Kurt. 2006. "Die Strafanstalt Roter Ochse in Halle 1933 bis 1989". In: Werner Freitag, Katrin Minner, Andreas Ranft (eds.), Geschichte der Stadt Halle. Volume 2: Halle im 19. und 20. Jahrhundert. Halle: Mitteldeutscher Verlag. pp. 415–431. ISBN 3-89812-383-9
- Bohse, Daniel, and Alexander Sperk (eds.). 2008. Der Rote Ochse Halle (Saale). Politische Justiz 1933–1945, 1945–1989. Berlin: Ch. Links Verlag. ISBN 978-3-86153-480-8 (Schriftenreihe der Stiftung Gedenkstätten Sachsen-Anhalt 1).
