= Hermann Willibald Fischer =

German mechanical engineer

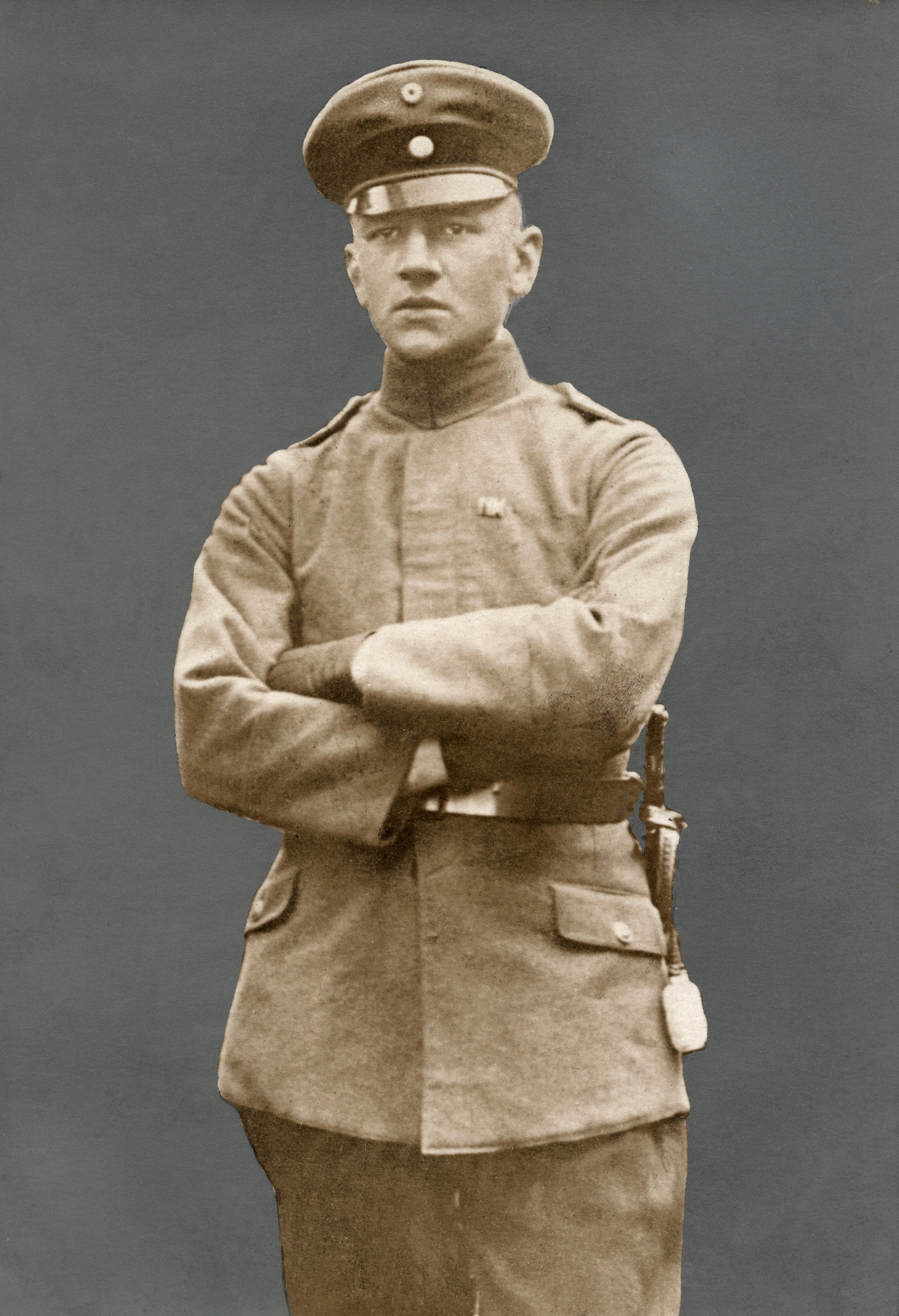
- Fischer in 1922
- Born: 6 February 1896; Florence, Kingdom of Italy
- Died: 17 July 1922 (aged 26); Saaleck Castle, Naumburg, Weimar Republic
- Cause of death: Suicide by gunshot
- Organization: Organisation Consul
- Status: Deceased

Hermann Willibald Fischer (6 February 1896 – 17 July 1922) was a German mechanical engineer. He was a member of an extreme right-wing terror group Organisation Consul (OC) and was one of the assassins of the German minister of foreign affairs, Walther Rathenau, on 24 June 1922.

== Life ==
Fischer was the son of a painter and professor in Dresden. He was a volunteer in World War I and at the end of the war was a company commander with the rank of Leutnant. After the war he studied mechanical engineering in Chemnitz, successfully completing his studies in March 1922. Periodically he interrupted his studies to join various Freikorps, initially during the Chemnitz food riots in August 1919. As a member of the Marine-Brigade Ehrhardt, he participated in the Kapp-Putsch and fought in early summer 1921 with the Upper Silesian Self-Protection Organisation. He was a member of various extreme right-wing organisations, among them the Deutschvölkischer Schutz- und Trutzbund.

It is not exactly known when Fischer joined the Organisation Consul (OC). According to Ernst von Salomon, Fischer was the commander of the actions of the OC in Saxony. He smuggled weapons to the Sudeten Germans in Czechoslovakia. During the escape of the convicted war criminal Ludwig Dithmar from prison in Naumburg/Saale he met his later co-assassin Erwin Kern. Kern, Salomon, and Fischer were members of a terror cell of OC for sabotage and murder, under the leadership of Karl Tillessen. According to statements from men from the OC in Hamburg, this group was also responsible for the still unsolved murder of the Jewish merchant Sina Aronsfrau in Mannheim, who was found shot in May 1922.

During the assassination of Rathenau, Fischer sat in the back of the car that was driven by Ernst Werner Techow. As the assassins overtook the foreign minister's car in Berlin-Grunewald, Kern fired with a machine gun and Fischer threw a hand-grenade into the open car.

After the attack, Kern and Fischer succeeded in fleeing and ultimately reached Saaleck Castle. The owner of the car, OC-member Hans Wilhelm Stein, went to Munich, to prepare their onward flight. Two travellers staying nearby on 16 July 1922 saw a light on in Saaleck Castle, although the owner had legally registered his absence because of his journey. (This relates to the requirement in Germany to register/deregister one's presence with the local authority.) Two police officers found Fischer and Kern on the morning of the following day. When Fischer took aim at one of them, they opened fire immediately, fatally hitting Kern. Fischer carried him to a bed, then shot himself.

During the period of Nazi rule (1933–45), the Rathenau murderers were revered as heroes. On 17 July 1933, Der Stahlhelm ('The Steel Helmet, League of Front-Line Soldiers'), Hermann Ehrhardt, and members of the SA and SS unveiled a memorial plaque in the castle. On 29 October 1933, a memorial stone was erected at the cemetery of Saaleck in the presence of Ernst Werner Techow, Heinrich Tillessen, Hanns Hustert and Ludwig Dithmar. The stone was removed and destroyed in 2000.

== Literature ==
- Martin Sabrow: Der Rathenaumord. Rekonstruktion einer Verschwörung gegen die Republik von Weimar. Oldenbourg, München 1994, ISBN 3-486-64569-2.
