= Heinrich Schulz (assassin) =

German officer and political assassin

Heinrich Ernst Walter Schulz
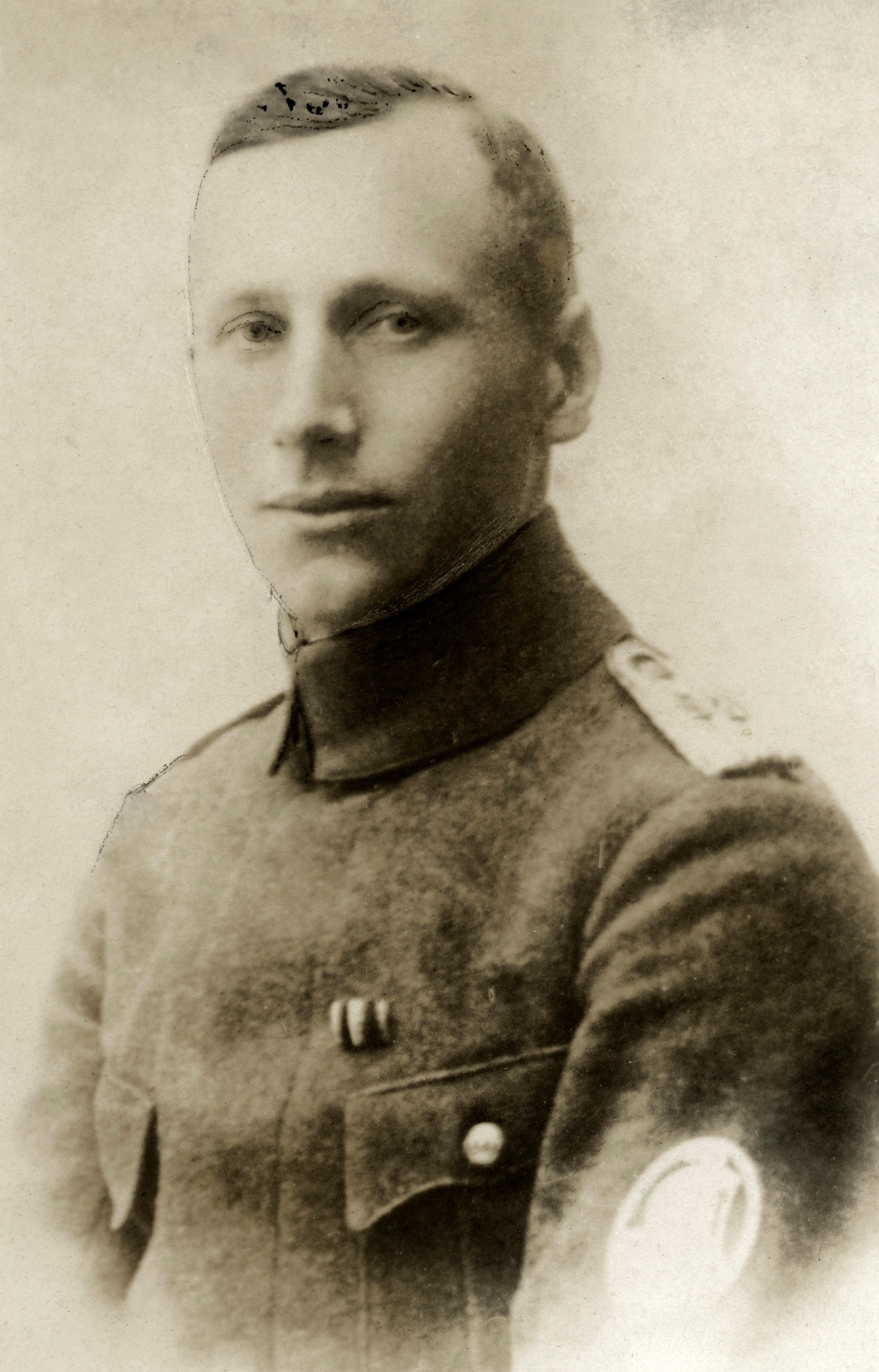
- Born: 21 July 1893; Saalfeld, German Empire
- Died: 5 June 1979 (aged 85); Eltville, Hesse, West Germany
- Organization: Organisation Consul
- Political party: Nazi Party
- Status: Deceased
- Motive: Revenge for the 1918 armistice
- Conviction: Manslaughter
- Penalty: 12 years imprisonment

Details
- Victims: Matthias Erzberger, 45
- Date: 26 August 1921
- Country: Weimar Republic
- Military career
- Allegiance: German Empire; Nazi Germany
- Branch: Imperial German Army; Waffen-SS
- Service years: 1914–1945
- Rank: SS-Obersturmbannführer

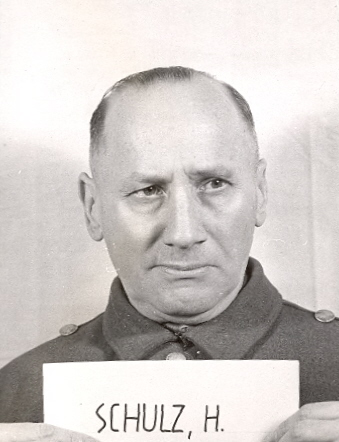
Schulz as a witness during the Nuremberg Trials

Heinrich Ernst Walter Schulz (21 July 1893 – 5 June 1979) was a German officer and political assassin. He was an accomplice of Heinrich Tillessen on 26 August 1921, when he committed the murder of German politician Matthias Erzberger.

== Life ==
=== Youth, World War I and Freikorps time ===
In his youth Schulz visited four years at the public school, followed by a further four years at the gymnasium in Saalfeld and three years at secondary school in Jena. After his exams, he undertook a commercial apprenticeship at a machine factory and iron foundry in Saalfeld.

At the beginning of First World War, Schulz volunteered for military service. During the war, in which he fought through until the end, he was wounded three times and commended several times. When the war ended, he was discharged from service with the rank of Lieutenant. His demobilization took place in December 1918 in Rudolstadt.

Afterwards, Schulz returned to his parents' house and resumed his old job at the Saalfeld engine works and iron foundry. In April 1919, he joined the Marinebrigade Ehrhardt. These Freikorps were organized to combat the left's revolutionary aspirations. With the marine brigade, he was successively employed in Munich, Hof and Berlin. In March 1920, he also participated in the occupation of Berlin's government district during the Kapp Putsch.

After the dissolution of the Marinebrigade, Schulz was, from April 1921, a member of the Organization Consul, a nationalist secret society, which in many ways was the successor of the Marinebrigade and tried to destabilize the Weimar Republic.

=== Assassination of Erzberger ===
On behalf of the Organisation Consul, on 26 August 1921, Schulz, together with Heinrich Tillessen, murdered Centre Party politician and former Finance Minister Matthias Erzberger at Bad Griesbach in the Black Forest. Erzberger, as head of the German Armistice Commission on 11 November 1918, had signed the ceasefire agreement of Compiègne. As a result, right-wing and national groups hated Erzberger and called him a "November criminal".

=== Flight and emigration ===
Schulz fled shortly after the assassination to Hungary, along with Tillessen, and was pursued for murder by Hermann Berchtold. He was recognized in 1924 and arrested. As the Hungarian government refused his extradition, he was released but expelled from the country. As a result, he went via Italy to South-West Africa and later to Spanish Guinea, where he lived as a plantation manager from 1926 to 1932. Due to malaria disease, he traveled in 1932 or 1933 for recovery to Barcelona. To get better health, he returned in March or April 1933 to Germany.

=== Life in the Nazi state (1933 through 1945) ===
Shortly before or shortly after his return to Germany, Schulz was granted amnesty by the impunity regulation from 21 March 1933, which was signed by Paul von Hindenburg. In May or June 1933 Schulz joined the SS, and he joined the Nazi Party in June 1937.

From the end of 1933 to 1934, Schulz was as Untersturmführer a Stabsführer in the SS-section XXX in Kassel. He left this position after clashes with his superior, Unger. Instead, he was transferred to the SS upper section Rhine in Koblenz, where he worked in the administration. With the reorganization of the upper sections in January 1936, he joined the SS upper section Fulda-Werra in Arolsen. Initially employed in the administration, in 1938 he was appointed welfare referent. He was successively promoted to Sturmbannführer and Obersturmbannführer.

On 15 April 1940 Schulz was taken into the Waffen-SS, where he was employed as a welfare officer in the Waffen-SS and police in the military district II (Kassel). In this position, he was concerned with the care of wounded members of the Waffen-SS and the supply of survivors. In regional terms, he was subordinated to the SS Group Leader Josias Erbprinz zu Waldeck-Pyrmont.

=== Postwar ===
When the war ended, Schulz was taken prisoner by the Americans. As a result, he was questioned during the Nuremberg Trials as a witness. Through this, his involvement in Erzberger's murder became apparent. In November 1946, the Baden Attorney General requested the transfer of the case to the competent Baden law enforcement authorities. However, this did not take place immediately, as Schulz faced a denazification trial. He was later classified as a major offender and sentenced to 8 years in a labour camp. In December 1949, Schulz was handed over to the German authorities and sent to custody in Offenburg.

Schulz's murder trial was held from 17 to 19 July 1950 at the District Court in Offenburg. Heinrich Tillessen was heard as a witness and, to Schulz's relief, portrayed himself as the main culprit. It has nevertheless been established that at least one deadly shot to the head came from Schulz's weapon. As such, Schulz was convicted of manslaughter, but not murder. He was sentenced to 12 years in prison.

On 22 December 1952, Schulz's sentence was suspended. He lived afterwards in Frankfurt am Main.

== Literature ==
- Cord Gebhardt: Der Fall des Erzberger-Mörders Heinrich Tillessen. Ein Beitrag zur Justizgeschichte nach 1945. Mohr Siebeck, Tübingen 1995, ISBN 3-16-146490-7 (Beiträge zur Rechtsgeschichte des 20. Jahrhunderts. Nr. 14).
- Reiner Haehling von Lanzenauer: Der Mord an Matthias Erzberger. Verlag der Gesellschaft für Kulturhistorische Dokumentation, Karlsruhe 2008, ISBN 3-922596-75-4 (Schriftenreihe des Rechtshistorischen Museums Karlsruhe. Heft 14).
