= Ernst Werner Techow =

German assassin

- Born: 12 October 1901; Berlin, Free State of Prussia, German Empire
- Died: 9 May 1945 (aged 43); Königsbrück, Saxony, Allied-occupied Germany
- Cause of death: Killed in action
- Organization: Organisation Consul
- Known for: Assassination of Walther Rathenau
- Political party: Nazi Party (1930-1931)

Ernst Werner Techow (12 October 1901 – 9 May 1945) was a German right-wing assassin who took part in the assassination of Foreign Minister of Germany Walther Rathenau on 24 June 1922.

Techow was a member of the Berlin chapter of Organisation Consul and conspired to kill Rathenau with Hermann Fischer and Erwin Kern. Techow was the getaway driver of the group and the only member to stand trial as Kern was killed by police and Fischer committed suicide. Techow initially joined the Nazi Party after his release from prison in 1930 but was expelled for supporting the Stennes Revolt in 1931 and dropped into obscurity. Techow briefly served in the Kriegsmarine during World War II from 1941 until severe injuries led to his discharge in 1943. Techow was killed after being captured by the Soviet Red Army while serving in the Volkssturm near Dresden on 9 May 1945.

A story was circulated that Techow had changed his political beliefs after his release from prison, joined the French Foreign Legion in 1941 under the name of "Tessier" and later embarked on helping Jews escape from occupied France, but this was found to be false.

== Early life ==
Ernst Werner Techow was born on 12 October 1901 in Berlin, the son of a city civil servant. His grandfather, Gustav Techow, was a supporter of the liberal Revolution of 1848 and forced into exile in Australia after the revolt was defeated. In 1918, Techow volunteered for the Imperial German Navy towards the end of World War I, receiving his training as a midshipman at the Mürwik Naval School. After Germany's defeat and the German Revolution of November 1918, he came into contact with counter-revolutionary forces and joined Marinebrigade Ehrhardt which participated in the Kapp Putsch. After the dissolution of the Freikorps, he connected himself with the Organisation Consul, the secret successor organization of the Marinebrigade Ehrhardt. Like many of his comrades, he was also a member of the violently antisemitic Deutschvölkischer Schutz und Trutzbund (German Nationalist Protection and Defiance Federation).

== Assassination of Walther Rathenau ==
Techow began studying mechanical engineering at the Technische Hochschule in Charlottenburg and became a member of the Corps Teutonia Berlin. He functioned as a courier for the Berlin branch of Organisation Consul.

On 24 June 1922, two months after the signing of the Treaty of Rapallo, Walther Rathenau, the Foreign Minister of Germany was assassinated by Organisation Consul. Rathenau was hated by many right-wing nationalist groups due to his insistence that Germany fulfil its obligations under the Treaty of Versailles, his signing of the which normalised relations and strengthened economic ties with Soviet Russia, and his Jewish background.

On that morning, Rathenau and his chauffeur were driving from his house in Grunewald to the Foreign Office in the Wilhelmstraße, as he did nearly daily. During the trip his vehicle was passed by another in which three men were sitting. Techow was behind the wheel, while Erwin Kern and Hermann Fischer were sitting in the back. While passing, Kern shot Rathenau with an MP 18 and Fischer threw a hand grenade into the car, before Techow quickly drove them away. A memorial stone in the Koenigsallee in Grunewald marks the scene of the crime. Rathenau was fervently mourned in Germany, with the news of his death leading to turmoil in the Reichstag and prompting millions of Germans to rally against terrorism.

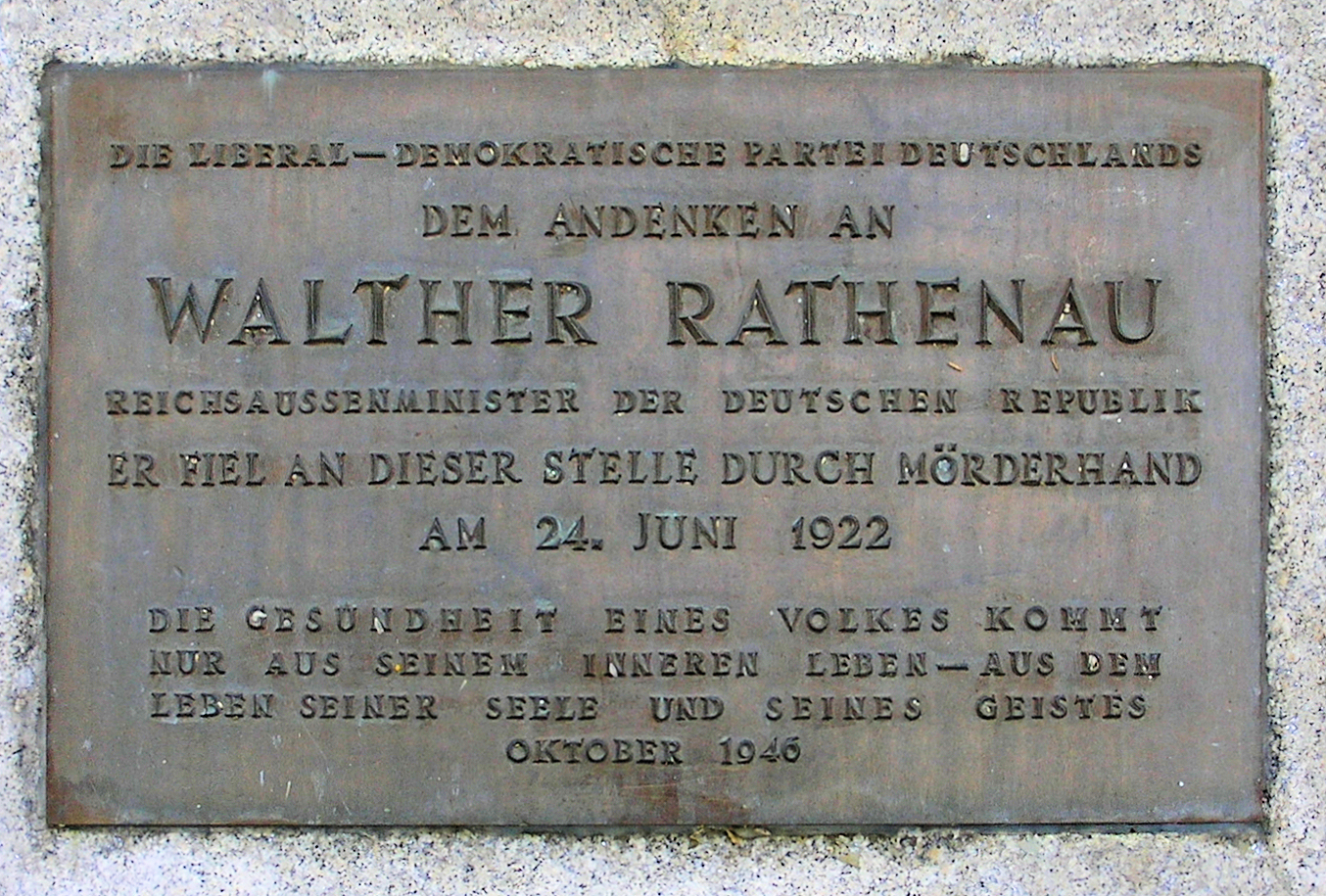
Gedenktafel Koenigsallee 16 (Grunew) Walther Rathenau

== Arrest and trial ==
When a confidant, Willi Günther, had bragged about the plot in public the assassins were identified within days. Techow was turned in by relatives on 29 June. Kern and Fischer managed to escape their pursuers until they were cornered in Saaleck Castle in Thuringia on 17 July. Fischer committed suicide after Kern was killed by a police detective. At the trial in October 1922, Techow was the only defendant indicted for the murder of Rathenau. He narrowly escaped a death sentence, when in a last-minute confession, he convinced the court that he had acted under duress. He claimed that Kern threatened to kill him when he tried to withdraw from the murder plot. Thus, he received a 15-year sentence for accessory to murder. He also may have benefitted by a letter which had been written by Rathenau's mother, Mathilde Rathenau, to Techow's mother:

In grief unspeakable, I give you my hand. You, of all women, the most pitiable. Say to your son that in the name and spirit of him who was murdered, I forgive, even as God may forgive, if before an earthly judge he makes a full and frank confession of his guilt, and before a heavenly one repent. Had he known my son, the noblest man earth bore, he had rather turn the weapon on himself than on him. May these words give peace to your soul....

== Later life and death ==
Techow's sentence was reduced in an amnesty in 1928. Upon his release from Roter Ochse prison in Halle (Saale) on 7 January 1930, he was welcomed by delegations of the local chapters of Der Stahlhelm, the German National People's Party, and the Nazi Party who considered him to be a hero. Techow himself joined the Nazi Party, its paramilitary wing the SA, and the editorial staff of the Berlin Nazi newspaper Der Angriff in early 1931. Tensions within the Nazi Party led Techow to take part in the Stennes Revolt, in which he allegedly slapped Joseph Goebbels, the Gauleiter (Nazi regional leader) of Berlin. He was expelled from the party in April 1931, and his last noted public appearance was in October 1933, when a monument for his fellow assassins Fischer and Kern was unveiled in Saaleck Castle. In 1934, he published an apologetic pamphlet about Rathenau's assassination.

During the following years, Techow worked for the Deutsche Umsiedlungs-Treuhand-Gesellschaft, an organisation that assisted the resettlement of ethnic Germans abroad. In May 1941, he enlisted in the Kriegsmarine and served as a war correspondent until he was severely burned when his ship was sunk in the Gulf of Finland in October 1942. He was discharged from the Kriegsmarine in August 1943.

In 1945, shortly before the end of the war, Techow either joined or was conscripted into the Volkssturm. He was taken as a prisoner of war while fighting against the Red Army in a suburb of Dresden, and held at the military training ground in Königsbrück. Techow was allegedly killed by a Soviet soldier due to a misunderstanding. The certified date of his death is 9 May 1945, the day after the signing of the German Instrument of Surrender.

== The legend of "Tessier" ==
In April 1943, the American journalist George W. Herald published the story "My favorite Assassin" in Harper's Magazine. Herald claimed to have met a captain of the French Foreign Legion with the name of Tessier in 1940. This captain, Herald claimed, turned out to be Ernst Werner Techow. He had been deeply moved by Mathilde Rathenau's letter, abstained from antisemitism and joined the French Foreign Legion. In 1941, Herald further reported, Techow/Tessier helped save hundreds of Jews in Marseille.

Herald's story was soon called into question because of some major inconsistences, but it still took on a life of its own. By reconstructing Techow's biography, historian Martin Sabrow has proved the story to be completely unfounded.

== In popular media ==
- Conspiracy against the Republic: Der Mord an Walther Rathenau The assassination of Walther Rathenau directed by Heinrich Billstein
- Jack Mayer's award-winning historical fiction, "Before the Court of Heaven" (2015) tells the story of Rathenau's assassination and Ernst Werner Techow's complex and harrowing redemption.
