= Reichstag Peace Resolution =

1917 call for a negotiated peace to end World War I

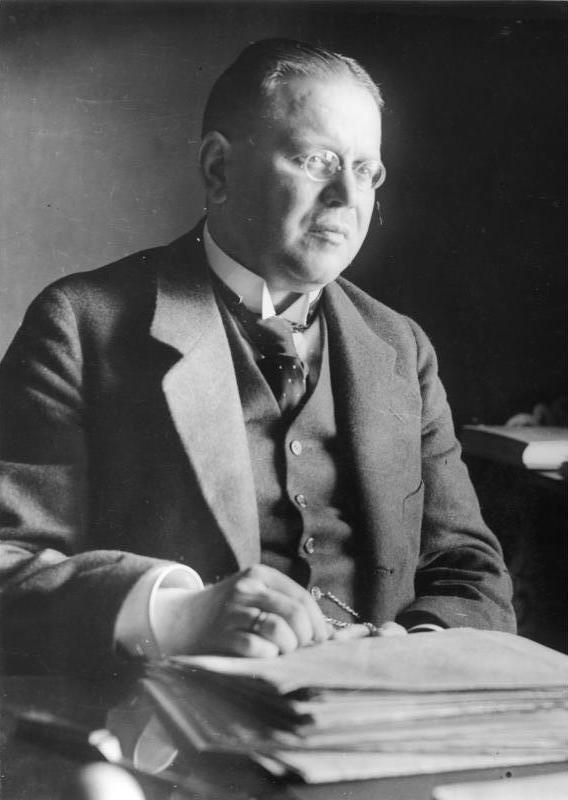
Matthias Erzberger was the driving force behind the Reichstag Peace Resolution.

The Reichstag Peace Resolution (German: Friedensresolution) was a resolution passed by the Reichstag of the German Empire on 19 July 1917 seeking a negotiated peace treaty to end World War I. It called for no annexations, freedom of the seas, and international arbitration. The resolution was rejected by the Reichstag's conservative parties, the German High Command, and the Allied powers. It had no effect on the progress of the war but brought the moderate parties that supported the resolution into a group that would shape much of the post-war Weimar Republic.

== Background ==
On 1 February 1917, the German Empire resumed its controversial strategy of unrestricted submarine warfare during World War I, which the military predicted that would force the United Kingdom to make peace within six months. Unrestricted submarine warfare was also one of the principal reasons for the United States entry into World War I on the side of the Allies in April, further complicating the German war effort. By the summer, it was clear that the blockade was not working and that the goal of pressuring the British into submission would not be achieved.

On 6 July 1917, Centre Party deputy Matthias Erzberger, in the main committee of the Reichstag, recommended that Germany continue the war but end unrestricted submarine warfare and seek a negotiated peace (Verständigungsfrieden). It was a position that was in stark contrast to the far-reaching annexation plans of the Pan-German League and most of the deputies in the Reichstag's conservative parties. The Social Democratic Party (SPD) and the Progressive People's Party (FVP), on the other hand, had already advocated for a peace initiative. By proposing the peace resolution, Erzberger hoped to secure the Social Democrats' approval for the continuation of war bonds.

Erzberger's efforts led to the Reichstag Peace Resolution drafted by the newly formed Inter-Party Committee (Interfraktionellen Ausschuss) that included representatives of the SPD, FVP, Centre and, initially, National Liberal parties. It was the first time that the Reichstag had attempted to actively intervene in the political events of the war. The resolution was intended to announce Germany's readiness for peace to the world, in particular its ally Austria-Hungary, which under the dual monarchy's new emperor, Charles I, was pressing for peace.

== Content ==
The text of the document:

As it did on August 4, 1914, the word uttered from the throne still holds true for the German people at the threshold of the war’s fourth year: “We seek no conquest.” (Note: The reference is to Emperor Wilhelm II's speech from the throne to the Reichstag. It included the words: "The current situation is not the result of temporary conflicts of interest or diplomatic constellations; it is the result of many years of ill-will against the power and prosperity of the German Reich. We are not driven by a lust for conquest, but by the indomitable will to preserve the place where God has placed us, for ourselves and all future generations.") Germany resorted to arms in order to protect its freedom and independence, to defend its territorial integrity.

The Reichstag strives for a peace of understanding, (Note: Verständigungsfrieden – more commonly translated as 'negotiated peace') for durable reconciliation among the peoples of the world. Territorial acquisitions achieved by force and violations of political, economic, or financial integrity are incompatible with such a peace.

The Reichstag furthermore rejects all plans that envisage economic exclusion or continuing enmity among nations after the war. The freedom of the seas must be guaranteed. Only economic peace will lay the groundwork for amicable coexistence among the peoples of the world.

The Reichstag will actively promote the creation of international legal organisations. As long, however, as enemy governments do not agree to such a peace, as long as they threaten Germany and its allies with territorial conquests and violations, the German people will stand together as one man, persevere unshakably, and fight on until its right and the right of its allies to life and free development is guaranteed.

United, the German people is unconquerable. In its determination, the Reichstag stands united with the men who are protecting the Fatherland in heroic combat. They can be certain of the never-ending gratitude of the entire nation.

The resolution, introduced by Erzberger, Eduard David, Friedrich Ebert, and Philipp Scheidemann – the latter three from the SPD – was adopted by a vote of 216 to 126. In favour were the SPD, Centre, and Progressive People's Party; against were the National Liberals, Conservatives, and Independent Social Democrats (USPD) – a more leftist and antiwar party that had broken away from the SPD in April 1917 and that opposed the resolution because they saw it as ambiguous and the product of foreign and domestic policy tactics. The resolution's supporters were the parties that had held the majority in the Reichstag since 1912 and would later form the Weimar Coalition, the group that was most supportive of the republic during the Weimar era.

== Consequences ==
=== Michaelis' opposition ===
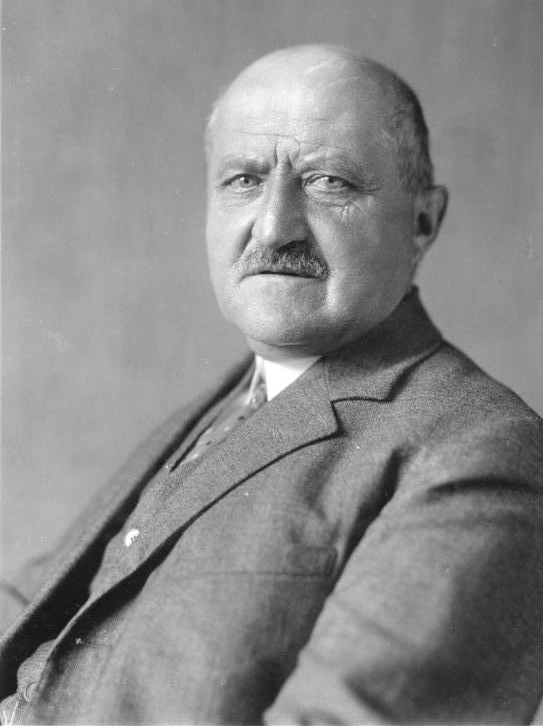
German chancellor Georg Michaelis

The Reichstag Peace Resolution was passed five days after Georg Michaelis was appointed Chancellor to replace Theobald von Bethmann Hollweg who had lost the support of the majority in the Reichstag and was strongly opposed by Germany's military leaders. Michaelis was inwardly an opponent of the peace resolution: "I was clear about the fact that I could not accept the resolution in such a form." An overt conflict, however, did not occur since Michaelis said that he accepted the resolution, presenting it in his inaugural address as a workable framework but speaking of the "resolution as I conceive it." The policy of the peace resolution was therefore stillborn under Michaelis.

=== Significance for German war aims ===
The peace resolution did not mean a renunciation of Germany's war aims. Even Erzberger, who was later ostracised by the political right for signing the Armistice of 11 November 1918 and for his insistence on approving the Treaty of Versailles, and who was assassinated in 1921 by members of the right-wing terrorist group Organisation Consul, thought that German interests in Belgium and the east were not affected by the resolution. The practical significance and implementation of the peace resolution was called into question from the outset by Michaelis' Reichstag speech demanding that Germany's borders be secured for all time, within the peace resolution "as I conceive it."

The "best chance during the war to reach an amicable peace" passed by unused when in August and September 1917 no negotiations were started on the basis of the peace resolution under the mediation offered by Pope Benedict XV.

=== Effects ===
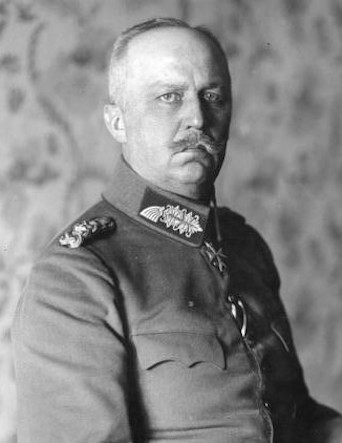
Erich Ludendorff in 1915

General Erich Ludendorff attributed the majority parties' change in attitude towards war aims to a "relapse of sentiment" and a "prevalence of international, pacifist, defeatist thinking". As a direct counter-reaction to the peace resolution, the annexationist, ethno-nationalist German Fatherland Party was founded with Ludendorff's participation. Along with the German Conservative Party, it was the most significant predecessor of the national-conservative German National People's Party that was founded in late November 1918 and became an important force during the Weimar Republic.

In spite of the adoption of the peace resolution, the Reichstag majority and the Supreme Army Command (OHL) did not subsequently stand as two opposing political camps. The newly formed "war-goal majority" in the Reichstag, in cooperation with the OHL and the Reich government, succeeded in repressing the peace resolution's offers in the period that followed. Heightened by annexation fanaticism and the Fatherland Party on the one hand and by war weariness, hunger, and the Independent Social Democrats on the other, the social and political divide became increasingly irreconcilable as the last year of the war began. The class antagonisms of German society visibly intensified. After the war, the peace resolution was seen by the radical right as part of the "stab in the back" against the German Army.

The Allies condemned the resolution as unacceptable. In line with Erzberger's own views, they believed that under the resolution Germany would keep the territory in France that it had occupied, along with both Belgium and Luxembourg, because the German people would not accept arbitration over what they had suffered so long to gain. The peace resolution was, however, a first step towards inter-party cooperation and full parliamentarisation of the Reichstag. The combination of political Catholicism, the workers' movement, and liberalism became a driving force behind the moderate outcome of the Revolution of 1918–1919 and in the political development of the Weimar Republic.
