= Kriegsrohstoffabteilung =

German government organisation in World War I

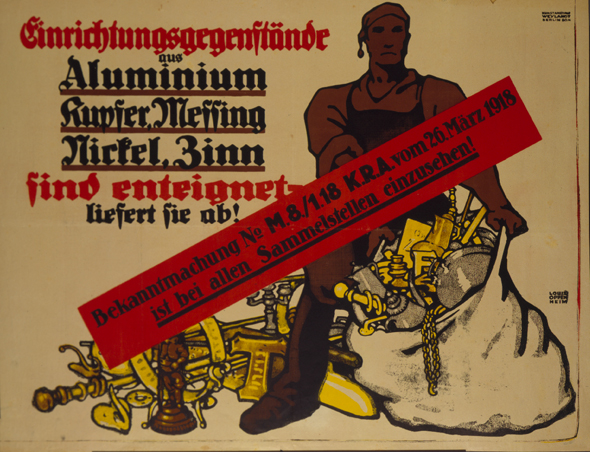
“Home Furnishings made of Aluminum, Copper, Nickel, Tin are Confiscated - Deliver Them Now! The Proclamation No. M./1.18 from K[riegs]R[ohstoff]A[bteilung] [War Materials Department] of 26 March 1918 is to be in view at all collection points.”

The Kriegsrohstoffabteilung (War Raw Materials Department) was an organisation set up in the German Empire to facilitate access to raw materials for their military.

Walther Rathenau and Wichard von Moellendorff proposed setting up an organisation to centrally manage all war-essential goods and raw materials. This led the Prussian War Minister Erich von Falkenhayn to decree the establishment of the Kriegsrohstoffabteilung (KRA) on 13 August 1914. The KRA reopened factories which had shut down because they were not economically viable. They also promoted the substitution of more readily available materials for scarce materials. One example was the use of the Haber-Bosch process of ammonia production, when the Allied Powers' blockaded the importation of Chilean saltpeter. By 1918 it had 2,500 employees.

Walther Rathenau was the first president of KRA, a position he held up until his resignation at the end of March 1915. He was replaced by Joseph Koeth.
