= Hans von Rosenberg =

German diplomat and politician (1874–1937)

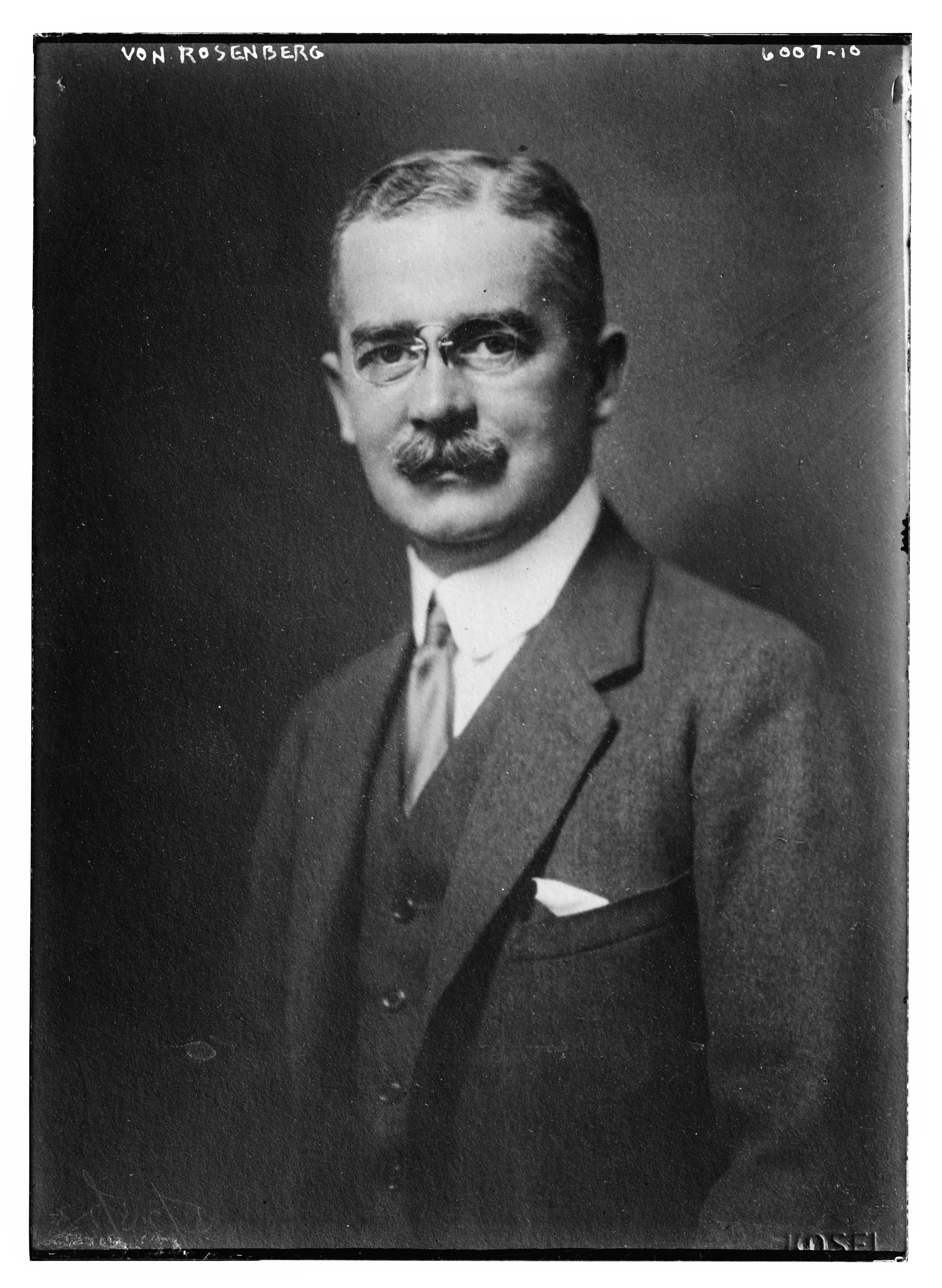

Reichsaußenminister (Foreign Minister), Weimar Republic
- In office 22 November 1922 – 12 August 1923
- President: Friedrich Ebert
- Chancellor: Wilhelm Cuno
- Preceded by: Joseph Wirth
- Succeeded by: Gustav Stresemann

Personal details
- Born: 26 December 1874 Berlin, Kingdom of Prussia
- Died: 30 July 1937 (aged 62) Fürstenzell, Nazi Germany
- Party: none
- Profession: Diplomat, politician

Frederic-Hans von Rosenberg (26 December 1874 – 30 July 1937) was a German diplomat and politician in the Weimar Republic. He served as Reichsaußenminister (Foreign Minister of Germany) in the cabinet of Wilhelm Cuno in 1922–1923.

== Early life ==
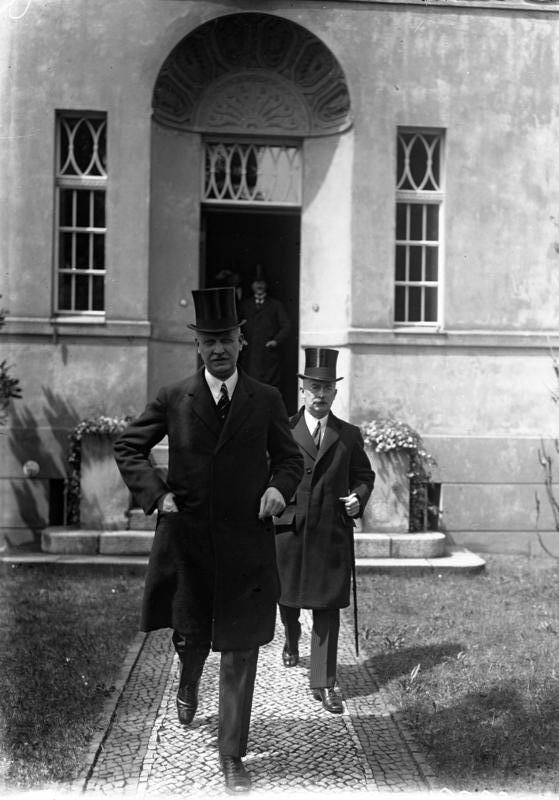
Frederic von Rosenberg behind chancellor Wilhelm Cuno in June 1923

Rosenberg was born as Frederic (or Friedrich) Hans von Rosenberg on 26 December 1874 in Berlin, Kingdom of Prussia (present-day Germany).

== Career ==
In 1897, Rosenberg was awarded the degree of Dr.Jur. and entered the Prussian judicial service, in which he was promoted to Assessor in 1903. That year he transferred to the foreign service (Auswärtiges Amt, AA). In 1910, Rosenberg became the head of the Balkans department at the AA, and in 1912 was promoted to Vortragender Rat.

During the First World War, he was a member of the German delegation negotiating with the Soviet Union at Brest-Litowsk and with Romania at Bucharest. In 1918–1919, he was at the German Embassy to Switzerland at Bern. In 1919, Rosenberg became Dirigent—head of the political department of the AA. In 1920–22, he was Ambassador at Vienna, and in 1922 briefly at Copenhagen.

He was Foreign Minister of Germany from November 1922 to August 1923 in the cabinet of chancellor Wilhelm Cuno.

From 1924 to 1933, he was Ambassador at Stockholm and then served from 1933 to 1935 as ambassador in Ankara. In 1935, he was given an indefinite leave (im einstweiligen Ruhestand).

== Personal life ==
Rosenberg died on 30 July 1937 at Fürstenzell, in Bavaria, Germany.

Preceded by Joseph Wirth	Foreign Minister of Germany; 1922–1923	Succeeded by Gustav Stresemann
