= Organisation Consul =

German terrorist organization (1920–1922)

- Reichskriegsflagge used from 1903 to 1919
- Leader: Hermann Ehrhardt
- Founded: 1920; 106 years ago
- Dissolved: July 21, 1922; 104 years ago
- Country: Germany
- Headquarters: Trautenwolfstraße 8, Munich
- Ideology: German ultranationalism Antisemitism
- Political position: Far-right
- Status: Banned
- Size: 5,000 personnel

Organisation Consul (O.C.) was a German ultra-nationalist and antisemitic militant organization that operated in the Weimar Republic from 1920 to 1922. It was formed by members of the disbanded Freikorps group Marinebrigade Ehrhardt and was responsible for political assassinations that had the ultimate goal of destroying the Republic and replacing it with a right-wing dictatorship.

Its two most prominent victims were the former finance minister Matthias Erzberger and Foreign Minister Walther Rathenau. The group was banned by the German government in 1922.

== Origins ==
In the early 1920s, Organisation Consul formed after the Marinebrigade Ehrhardt, a Freikorps unit, was disbanded by the government in 1920 for its prominent role in the anti-republican Kapp Putsch. Organisation Consul was formed, in part to allow membership of the Marinebrigade Ehrhardt to maintain friendships and contacts with one and other. The organisation was named after a pseudonym used by Hermann Ehrhardt "Consul Eichmann", who was also the namesake and commander of the Marinebrigade Ehrhardt.

Some who had previously been members of the Brigade formed the Association of Former Ehrhardt Officers, which then became the Organisation Consul. The O.C. was a militarily organized cadre group whose members were recruited largely from former mostly front-line officers of the Imperial German Army, Imperial Navy and the Freikorps. The Reich government and Reichswehr leadership initially tolerated it, hoping to use it and similar associations to undermine the arms restrictions of the Treaty of Versailles.

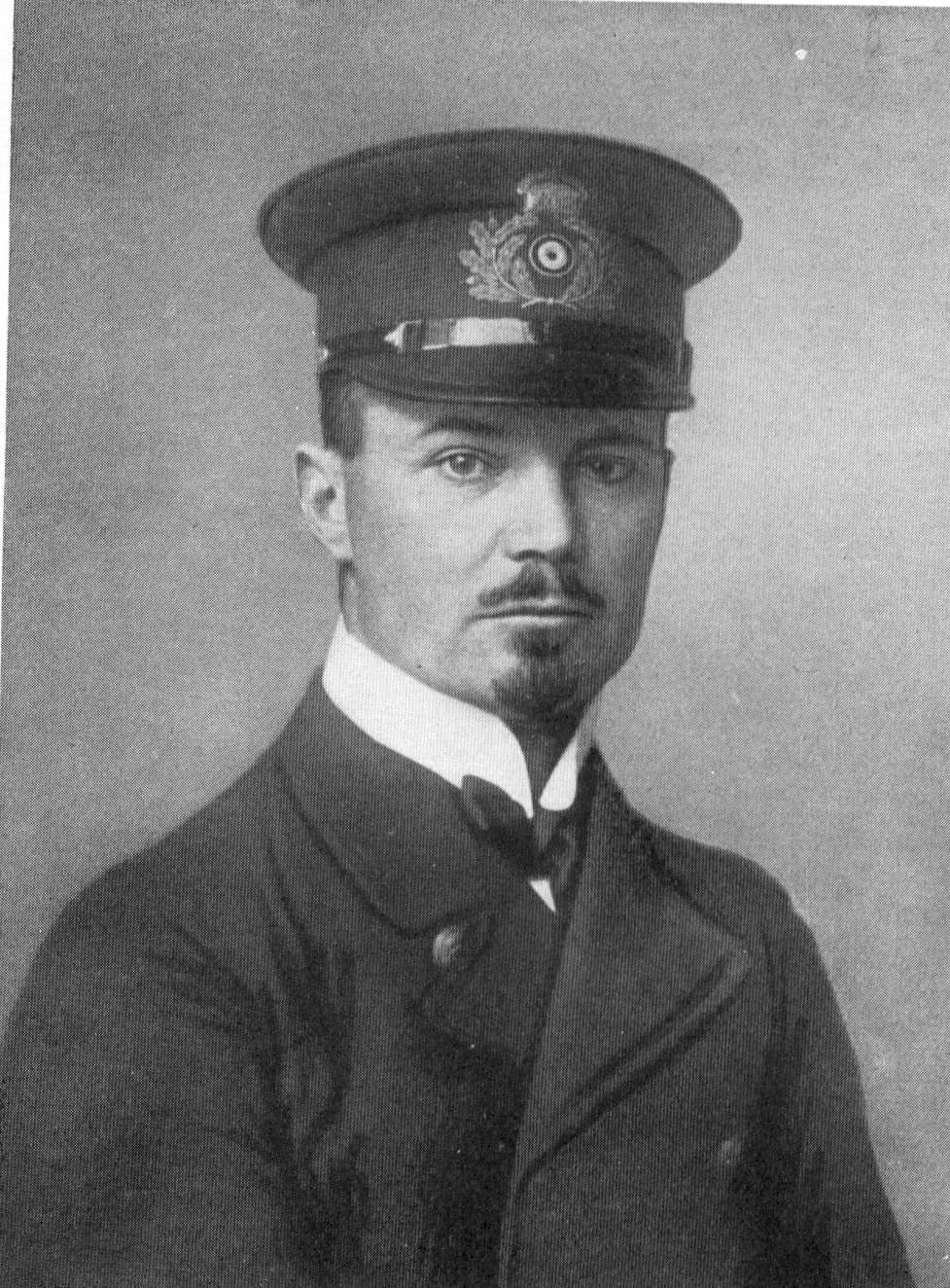
Hermann Ehrhardt

== Organization ==
With liaison officers throughout the Reich, the Organisation Consul could draw from a pool of an estimated 5,000 men. Eventually it came to have districts encompassing large areas of the nation. They were particularly active in Berlin, where many of their crimes were committed. One of the best known members was the Freikorps fighter and post-war author Ernst von Salomon. The average age of the members was between 20 and 30.

They were motivated by anti-bourgeois sentiments, extreme nationalism, anti-Semitism and opposition to Marxism. Jews were excluded from participation, and every member had to affirm that he was of "German descent". The O.C.'s statutes listed their goal as "the fight against everything anti-national and international, Judaism, social democracy and radical left-wing parties". They also took part in the internal Feme murders against anyone, even members of their own group, who they believed to have betrayed their cause. Their statutes stated that "traitors fall to the Feme".

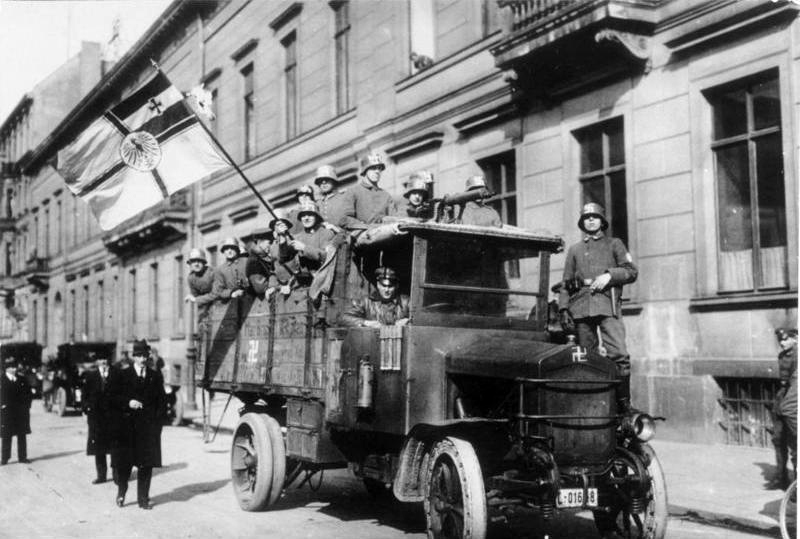
Marine Brigade Erhardt troops during the Kapp Putsch in 1920. Note the swastikas on their helmets and vehicle

The O.C. operated out of Munich where its presence was tacitly tolerated or covered up by Munich police chief Ernst Pöhner. As a front, the organization created the Bavarian Wood Products Company headquartered in Munich. About 30 full-time employees worked there under the de facto leadership of Ehrhardt's chief of staff, Alfred Hoffmann. The O.C. had seven main districts, Hamburg, Hanover, Berlin, Frankfurt am Main, Dresden, Breslau and Tübingen, each with up to three sub-districts.

The establishment of planned additional districts was prevented by the organization's ban in 1922. It financed itself through illegal arms trafficking, including with the Irish Republican Army. The eponymous "consul" was Ehrhardt himself, who ran the organization in a tautly militarily manner. Through the O.C. he oversaw a network of other paramilitary organizations. Members of the O.C. took part in the 1920 referendum campaign that preceded the Upper Silesia plebiscite and, as Sturmkompanie Koppe, in the suppression of the Third Polish Uprising which attempted to have the territory ceded to Poland.

The strategic goal of the O.C. was to provoke the political left into an uprising, which they then wanted to put down together with the Reichswehr in order to use the position of power thus gained to crush the Weimar Republic and install a right-wing dictatorship. In 1921, the organization played a significant role in the formation of the Nazi Sturmabteilung (SA) when O.C. Lieutenant Hans Ulrich Klintzsch took over the military leadership of the former Gymnastic and Sports Division of the Nazi Party (NSDAP). Julius Schreck and Joseph Berchtold, later Adolf Hitler's bodyguards, also came from its membership.

In the Organisation Consul's mission statement it defined its spiritual aims as "the cultivation and dissemination of nationalist thinking; warfare against all anti-nationalists and internationalists; warfare against Jewry, social democracy and leftist radicalism; fomentation of internal unrest in order to attain the overthrow of the anti-nationalist Weimar Constitution." Its material aims were "The organization of determined, nationalist-minded men . . . local shock troops for breaking up meetings of an anti-nationalist nature; maintenance of arms and the preservation of military ability; the education of youth in the use of arms . . . Only those men who have determination, who obey unconditionally and who are without scruples . . . will be accepted. . . . The organization is a secret organization."

The O.C. was financed by industrialists and enemies of the Weimar Republic in the bourgeoisie, nobility and military, who, like Erhardt, wanted to force a violent change in the political situation.

In addition to the O.C's extremisim, the organisation also served as a social network of those who had been formerly been members of Marinebrigade Ehrhardt.

== Assassinations ==
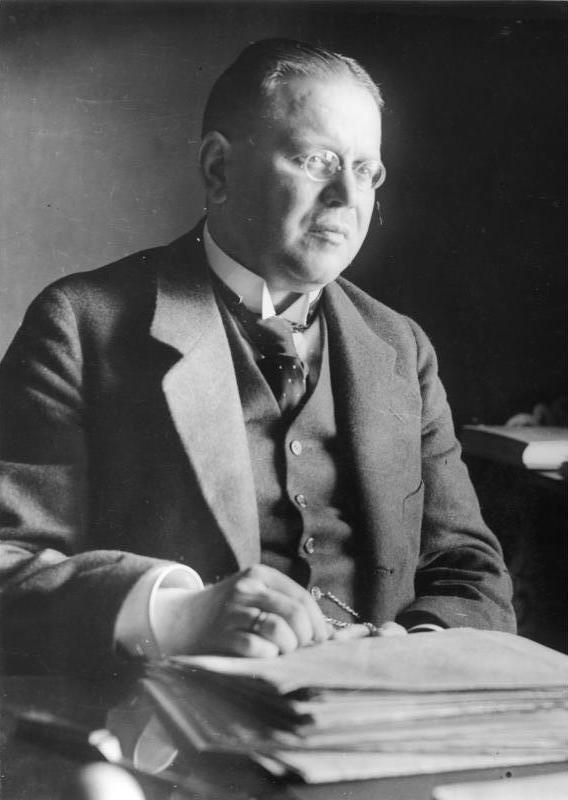
Matthias Erzberger

On 26 August 1921 Matthias Erzberger, a Centre Party politician hated by the right wing as one of the signers of the armistice between Germany and the Allied Powers at the end of World War I, was murdered by Heinrich Schulz and Heinrich Tillessen near Bad Griesbach in the Black Forest. The police investigation quickly led to the perpetrators and finally to the Organisation Consul to which the two belonged.

Following additional investigations, 34 members of the O.C. were arrested across Germany. Most of them had to be released soon after because the suspicion that the O.C. had planned and carried out Erzberger's murder as an organization could not be sufficiently supported by the evidence. Some of the members were nevertheless charged with membership in a secret society.

Members of the O.C. were also responsible for the attempted assassination of Philipp Scheidemann using prussic acid on 4 June 1922, and probably for the murder of Karl Gareis, a member of the Bavarian parliament, on 9 June 1921.

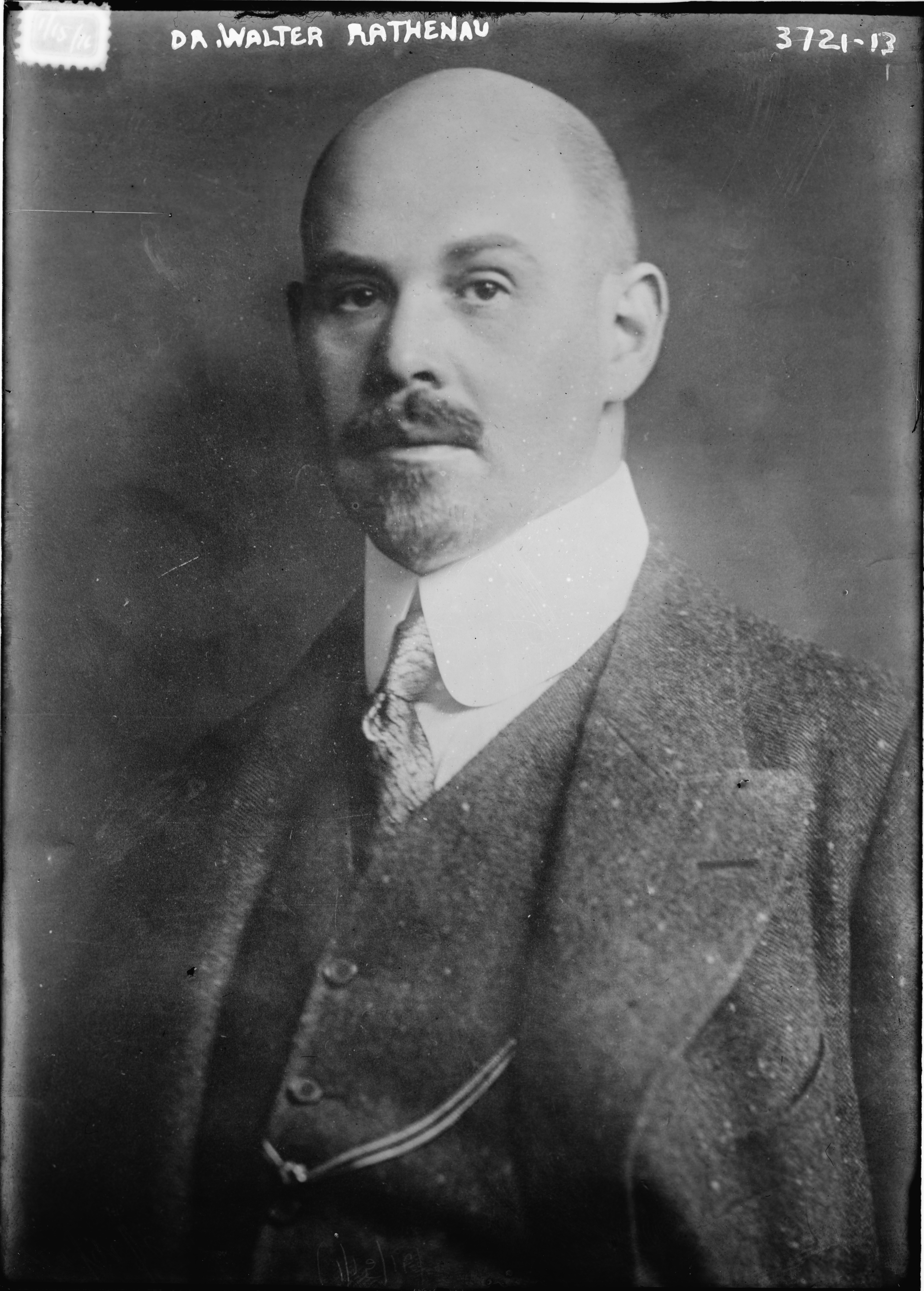
Walther Rathenau

On 24 June 1922 members of the O.C. assassinated German Foreign Minister Walther Rathenau. One of those involved was Ernst von Salomon, who described his membership in the O.C. in his popularly successful autobiographical work The Questionnaire (Der Fragebogen), published in 1951.

Emil Julius Gumbel wrote that that of over 300 political murders between 1918 and 1922, that there were none which did not in involve the Organisation Consul.

== Ban and successor organizations ==
During the investigation of the Erzberger murder, the headquarters of the O.C. was raided. On the basis of the Law for the Protection of the Republic (Gesetz zum Schutze der Republik) enacted on 21 July 1922, the Organisation Consul was banned. The Viking League was founded as a successor organization.

During the Nazi era, the members of the O.C. were assigned to the Schutzstaffel (SS). They were celebrated as "heroes of the national resistance" even though the O.C. had been in competition with the NSDAP. Ehrhardt clashed several times with Adolf Hitler in Munich in the 1920s, accusing him among other things of breaking his word. He fled to Austria in 1934, and died there in 1971.

== Notable members ==
- Joseph Berchtold: co-founder of the Sturmabteilung (SA) and Schutzstaffel (SS)
- Heinrich Böhmcker: lawyer, SA general and Mayor of Bremen
- Günther Brandt: anthropologist at the SS Race and Settlement Office
- Leonardo Conti: Nazi Reich Health Leader involved in involuntary euthanasia programs
- Hermann Willibald Fischer: accomplice in the murder of Walther Rathenau
- Eberhard Kautter: member of the Marinebrigade Ehrhardt, Ehrhardt's deputy and co-founder of the Viking League
- Manfred Freiherr von Killinger: mastermind of the assassination of Matthias Erzberger and later Nazi functionary
- Hans Ulrich Klintzsch: supreme commander of the Nazi Sturmabteilung (SA) 1921–1923
- Ernst von Salomon: novelist and screenwriter involved in the assassination of Walther Rathenau
- Julius Schreck: first leader of the Schutzstaffel (SS)
- Franz Walter Stahlecker: commander of SS security forces and Sicherheitsdienst (SD) in the Baltic region of Russia
- Ernst Werner Techow: accomplice in the assassination of Walther Rathenau
- Philipp Wurzbacher: SA official and Nazi Party Reichstag member

== See also ==
- Political violence in the German Republic

== Works cited ==
- Stern, Howard (1963). "The Organisation Consul". The Journal of Modern History. 35 (1): 20–32. ISSN 0022-2801.
- Achilles, Manuela (January 22, 2026). Invisible Fatherland: Constitutional Patriotism in Weimar Germany (1 ed.). Cambridge University Press. doi:10.1017/9781009651028. ISBN 978-1-009-65102-8.

== General references ==
- Selig, Wolfram (30 July 2012). "Organisation Consul". In Benz, Wolfgang (ed.). Handbuch des Antisemitismus. Judenfeindschaft in Geschichte und Gegenwart (in German). Berlin: De Gruyter. ISBN 978-3-11-027878-1.
- Waite, Robert G. L. (1969). Vanguard of Nazism The Free Corps Movement In Post-War Germany 1918-1923. New York. W. W. Norton and Company.. 356 pages. ISBN 978-0-393-00181-5
