= Heinrich Tillessen =

German assassin (1894–1984)

- Tillessen at his trial (1947)
- Born: 27 November 1894; Cologne, German Empire
- Died: 12 November 1984 (aged 89); Koblenz, West Germany
- Organization: Organisation Consul
- Political party: Nazi Party
- Relatives: Karl Tillessen
- Status: Deceased
- Motive: Revenge for the 1918 armistice
- Convictions: Crimes against humanity Murder
- Penalty: 15 years imprisonment

Details
- Victims: Matthias Erzberger, 45
- Date: 26 August 1921
- Country: Weimar Republic

Heinrich Tillessen (27 November 1894 – 12 November 1984) was a German former naval officer who, along with his accomplice Heinrich Schulz, assassinated former Minister of Finance Matthias Erzberger, who endorsed the Treaty of Versailles.

The trial of Heinrich Tillessen was held in post-war Germany, and received widespread attention from the public and from legal experts, exemplifying numerous problems in the judicial processing of crimes committed before and during the Nazi period.

== Youth ==
The father of Heinrich Tillessen was an artillery officer with the rank of lieutenant general. Tillessen's mother, Karoline, was Dutch. Tillessen grew up with ten siblings (three brothers and seven sisters) in Cologne, Metz, and Koblenz – all of which his father was stationed in. One of his brothers was Navy Admiral Werner Tillessen. The family was considered devout Catholics. When Tillessen's father retired in 1904, the family moved to Koblenz.

== Career ==
Following the death of his father and mother (1910 and 1911), Tillessen left high school and joined the Imperial German Navy as a midshipman on 1 April 1912. On 12 April 1913, he was promoted to Fähnrich zur See (petty officer). Until the beginning of World War I in 1914, he spent most of his time training in various specialties, including a placement on the training ship SMS Hertha.

During World War I, he served as a deck officer in smaller units, mainly in the Baltic Sea. He was promoted to Leutnant zur See (navy lieutenant) on 22 March 1915. On 13 July 1917, he was transferred to the 17th Torpedo Boat Half-Flotilla, where he was employed as a watch officer on the leading boat, under commander Hermann Ehrhardt. It was during this service that Ehrhardt impressed Tillessen as a strong leader and a charismatic officer.

As part of the surrender of the German navy, as commander, he led and transferred a torpedo boat to Scapa Flow in 1919. After self-scuttling the fleet there, he remained in captivity as a British prisoner of war until 6 February 1920. On 30 July 1920, he was discharged from the Navy at his own request.

== Assassination of Matthias Erzberger ==
Upon hearing of the Kapp Putsch, Tillessen rushed to Berlin where, on the advice of his brother Karl, he became a member of the Marinebrigade Ehrhardt (Ehrhardt Marine Brigade) – the assault company of his former flotilla commander. Within the brigade, he met his later accomplice, Heinrich Schulz, for the first time.

Following the Kapp Putsch, the dissolution of the Ehrhardt Brigade was ordered on 29 February 1920. After the group disbanded, Tillessen attempted to undertake a civilian job, and on the advice of his brother Karl, accepted a position with the Bavarian politician Georg Heim in Regensburg. With three other former members of the brigade, including Schulz, Tillessen acted as Heim's bodyguard. During his employment, Tillessen became increasingly radicalised within the environment of the Deutschvölkischer Schutz- und Trutzbund (German Nationalist Protection and Defiance Federation) and the political leanings of Heim.

However, under the continued leadership of Hermann Ehrhardt, the brigade re-formed in Bavaria to create its successor group entitled the Organisation Consul (O.C.). The stated goal of the group to murder key political figures, a series of killings that became known as the Feme murders. On April 30, 1921, at their own request, Tillessen and Schulz were called to Hermann Ehrhardt in Munich. Here, they worked at the headquarters of the OC in its initial stages of development. The chief of military operations in the Munich headquarters was Manfred von Killinger, also a former torpedo boat commander. In the beginning of August 1921, Killinger ordered Tillessen and Schulz to assassinate Erzberger.

On 26 August 1921, during a walk with a fellow Reichstag deputy and member of the Center Party, Karl Diez, the two assassins ambushed Erzberger in the Black Forest near Bad Griesbach. From a distance of less than three feet, both perpetrators fired a number of pistol shots. Five shots hit Erzberger in the lung, thigh and stomach causing serious injury. Erzberger attempted to escape downhill but collapsed after 10 meters. The assailants pursued Erzberger, shooting him in the head at point-blank range. An autopsy later confirmed a total of twelve bullets within the deceased Erzberger.

== Escape ==
Tillessen and Schulz initially returned to Munich where the O.C. was operating under the innocuous name of the "Bavarian Wood Products Company". However, the investigating authorities were able to quickly determine their identity, and the police procured a search warrant which included pictures of the two assassins. On 31 August 1921, the perpetrators departed Munich. Tillessen initially took refuge in the Alps after the assassination, moving on to the Burgenland region via Salzburg. In November and December 1921, both received false passports and escaped to Hungary. In Budapest, they assumed new identities, and joined a Freikorps supported by Miklós Horthy's national army, whose protection they had been promised during the early stages of the assassination plan. Tillessen and Schulz were recognised several times during their stay in Hungary, temporarily travelling through the country as hired gardeners. Requests for extradition by Germany were declined, as Hungary had no Extradition Agreement. With the assistance of his political associates in Germany, Tillessen then acquired a fraudulent German passport and travelled to Spain at the end of 1925. Upon arrival in Madrid, he secured employment with a Spanish airline and led a modest, middle-class lifestyle. He avoided contact with his fellow countrymen and suffered from depressive symptoms that persisted into his later life.

== Return and second time in the military ==
In December 1932, Heinrich Tillessen returned to Germany and took refuge with his siblings in Cologne. After Adolf Hitler was appointed chancellor on January 30, 1933, President Paul von Hindenburg signed the so-called Straffreiheitsverordnung (i.e. e. Impunity Regulation) on March 21 of the same year, the first paragraph of which states:

"Impunity is granted for crimes committed in the fight for the national uprising of the German people, in preparation for it or in the fight for the German soil (...)."

As a result of the edict, individuals who had been involved in the Feme murders were granted amnesty, resulting in Tillessen no longer needing to hide. He subsequently regained employment, established a livelihood, married and settled in Düsseldorf, Mannheim, and Heidelberg, before being admitted as an official member of the Nazi Party (member no. 3,575,464) on 1 September 1933 and the Sturmabteilung. On 4 September 1939, he was conscripted into the German Military, however, his service was terminated soon afterwards due to being declared unfit for service. During the Second World War, Tillessen served the German Admiralty in a land-based role and was eventually discharged in late 1944, with the rank of Lieutenant Commander. Subsequently, he returned to his family in Heidelberg.

== Arrest and first trial ==
Following the occupation of Heidelberg by American troops on May 3, 1945, Heinrich Tillessen was apprehended in response to reports of his affiliation with the National Socialist Party. Upon his apprehension, Tillessen voluntarily confessed of his complicity in the killing of Matthias Erzberger. On 15 August 1945, he was formally arrested with a warrant.

On 13 May 1946, Tillessen was transferred to Freiburg im Breisgau to stand trial before the Landgericht (state court) of Baden. On 26 August 1946, exactly 25 years after the crime, the Baden Attorney General, Karl Siegfried Bader, submitted a complaint to the District Court of Offenburg in order to proceed with a criminal hearing before the Criminal Chamber. Nevertheless, the court rejected the negotiation of the principle hearing on 10 September 1946, citing that there was impunity in accordance with the Straffreiheitsverordnung Impunity Regulation of 1933:

"For the court it is proved that the perpetrator committed the act out of exaggerated love for the country in order to lead Germany to a better future. Defence counsel, in dealing with the history of political assassinations and the differences of opinion concerning it, referred to the assassination of Gessler by Wilhelm Tell, which became a national epic."

The prosecution presented an appeal to the Higher Regional Court in Freiburg on September 13, 1946, and argued the Straffreiheitsverordnung decree was declared void by the Allied Control Council and military governments, as it was deemed to be an injustice from the National Socialist regime. On 30 September 1946, the Court of Appeal in the chamber of the Higher District Court overturned the ruling of 10 September, ruling that a trial should commence. Despite conceding certain elements of the prosecution's arguments, the chamber disagreed that the 1933 edict was not applicable in this case. It was suggested that conviction on the basis of crimes against humanity under Control Council Law No.10 should be considered.

The trial took place in November 1946, during which the prosecution called for a death sentence to be imposed, while the defence argued for the accused's exoneration, citing the Impunity Regulation of 1933. On 29 November 1946, the chairman of the chamber, Rudolf Goering (1883-1964), announced the acquittal of the accused. Specifically, the Court pointed out that it considered that the Impunity Regulation of 1933 was applicable. Nevertheless, the prosecution immediately appealed the verdict, thereby preventing the res judicata of the judgment (i.e. preventing the verdict from taking effect).

The judgement sparked a notable public reaction, with the press condemning it as "Schandurteil" (i.e. a disgraceful verdict). Furthermore, the constituent assembly of the state of Baden, which assembled in Freiburg, protested in a spontaneous resolution to express their disapproval assertively.

== Second proceedings before the Tribunal général in Rastatt ==
The French occupying forces responded swiftly: Heinrich Tillessen was apprehended by the French secret service on the date of release, and was subsequently interned in France. Consequently, the chairman of the examining tribunal, Regional Court Director Goering, was removed, and given a leave of absence, before officially taking retirement.

The French Tribunal général du Gouvernement militaire de la zone française d'occupation en Allemagne (GMZFOA), located in Rastatt near Baden-Baden, was the supreme court for all civil matters in Baden during the period of the Allied occupation in the aftermath of WWII. In December 1946 and January 1947 the tribunal conducted proceedings to determine the legal validity of the 1933 Regulation on Exemption from Punishment (Straffreiheitsverordnung) adopted by Adolf Hitler, following the end of the war. The verdict of the tribunal was issued on January 6, 1947.

The court found in its judgment that the Straffreiheitsverordnung of 1933, which is binding "for all German courts and administrative bodies”, should no longer be applied. It concluded that the election of the Reichstag on March 5, 1933, was tainted by flagrant illegality and use of force by the government, thus making the Enabling Act of March 24, 1933, unconstitutional rather than constitutional as had been claimed. Furthermore, the court specified that through the concentration of all powers in the hands of Hitler, the Act violated the essential requirements of proper and normal rule of law, and Hitler's government had never sought a vote of confidence of a properly constituted Parliament, a requirement defined in the Weimar Constitution of August 11, 1919, which was then in effect.

The judgement of the Landgericht Offenburg was repealed by the German appellate court and the case was referred to the regional court in Konstanz for a new trial. The second trial was held from 25–28 February 1947 and presided over by District Court Director Anton Henneka, who became a judge at the Federal Constitutional Court from 1951 to 1968. At the trial, the prosecution called for a death sentence and the defence argued for a lesser sentence of manslaughter. Ultimately, the court found Tillessen guilty of murder and crimes against humanity in violation of Control Council Law No. 10, and sentenced him to 15 years of imprisonment, with the ruling being final.

== Pardon ==
Petitions for clemency were submitted by Tillessen's wife and the defence attorney shortly after he was found guilty. In May 1952, Tillessen was granted parole, and, in December 1952 the remaining sentence was suspended on probation. Additionally, in March 1958, at the plea of Matthias Erzberger's widow, the remaining sentence was commuted to time service, on grounds of mercy. Tillessen went on to resume work before settling in Heidelberg, Frankfurt, and eventually Koblenz in his later years. He died in 1984, at the age of 90.

== Literature ==
- Cord Gebhardt: Der Fall des Erzberger-Mörders Heinrich Tillessen. Ein Beitrag zur Justizgeschichte nach 1945. Mohr, Tübingen 1995 (Beiträge zur Rechtsgeschichte des 20. Jahrhunderts, Band 14), ISBN 3-16-146490-7.
- Reiner Haehling von Lanzenauer: Der Mord an Matthias Erzberger. Verlag der Gesellschaft für Kulturhistorische Dokumentation, Karlsruhe 2008 (Schriftenreihe des Rechtshistorischen Museums Karlsruhe, Band 14). ISBN 3-922596-71-1.
- Edith Raim: Justiz zwischen Diktatur und Demokratie : Wiederaufbau und Ahndung von NS-Verbrechen in Westdeutschland 1945 - 1949. Oldenbourg, München 2013, ISBN 978-3-486-70411-2. (Zugl.: Augsburg, Univ., Habil.-Schr., 2012).
