= List of Freikorps members =

German paramilitary organization

Freikorps (English: Free Corps) were German volunteer military or paramilitary units. The term was originally applied to voluntary armies formed in German lands from the middle of the 18th century onwards. Between World War I and World War II the term was also used for the anti-communist paramilitary organizations that arose during the Weimar Republic. This is a partial list of the post-World War I Freikorps members.

== Freikorps members ==
- Hugo von Abercron, German aviation pioneer
- Wilhelm Albert, SS General
- Herbert Albrecht, NSDAP Gauleiter of Mecklenburg-Lübeck
- Friedrich Alpers, SS General
- Ludolf-Hermann von Alvensleben, SS General
- Ludolf Jakob von Alvensleben, SS Colonel
- Benno von Arent, SS Colonel
- Karl Astel, racial scientist and eugenicist
- Erich von dem Bach-Zelewski, SS General
- Hermann Balck, German Army General
- Rudolf Bamler, German Army General
- Eleonore Baur, SS nurse and NSDAP member
- Hans Baur, SS General
- Heinrich Bennecke, SA General
- Gottlob Berger, SS General
- Theodor Berkelmann, SS General
- Rudolph Berthold, World War I ace
- Lothar Beutel, SS General
- Walther Bierkamp, SS General
- Helmut Bischoff, SS Lieutenant Colonel
- Wilhelm Bittrich, SS General
- Dr. Kurt Blome, Nazi physician/SA General
- Hans-Jürgen von Blumenthal, German Army Major
- Günther Blumentritt, German Army General
- Arthur Böckenhauer, SA General
- Fedor von Bock, German Army Field Marshal
- Friedrich-Wilhelm Bock, SS Colonel
- Karl Bodenschatz, Luftwaffe General
- Adolf von Bomhard, SS General
- Martin Bormann, Secretary to the Führer/SS General
- Ferdinand Brandner, SS Colonel
- Franz Breithaupt, SS General
- Fritz von Brodowski, German Army General
- Helmuth Brückner, NSDAP Gauleiter of Silesia/SA General
- Wilhelm Brückner, SA General
- Karl Brunner, SS General
- Franz Büchner, World War I Air ace
- Josef Bürckel, NSDAP Gauleiter of Westmark/SS General
- Wilhelm Burgdorf, German Army General
- Hans Georg Calmeyer, German lawyer
- Wilhelm Canaris, German Navy Admiral/Chief of Military Intelligence
- Charles Edward, Duke of Saxe-Coburg and Gotha, SA General
- Hellmut von der Chevallerie, German Army General
- Kurt von der Chevallerie, German Army General
- Friedrich Christiansen, Luftwaffe General
- Leonardo Conti, SS General
- Max de Crinis, SS Colonel
- Kurt Daluege, Chief of the Order Police/SS General
- Richard Walther Darré, NSDAP Reichsleiter/SS General
- Adolf Ritter von Denk, NSKK General
- Otto Deßloch, Luftwaffe General
- Heinrich Deubel, SS Colonel
- Karl Diebitsch, SS Colonel
- Christoph Diehm, SS General
- Eduard Dietl, German Army General
- Josef Dietrich, SS General
- Oskar Dirlewanger, SS Colonel
- Heinrich Graf zu Dohna-Schlobitten, German Army General
- Harry Domela, imposter
- Hans Döring, SS General
- Anton Dunckern, SS General
- Karlfried Graf Dürckheim, Nazi diplomat and propagandist
- Freiherr Karl von Eberstein, SS General
- Hermann Ehrhardt, SS General
- Franz Ritter von Epp, NSDAP Reichsstatthalter of Bavaria/German Army General
- Karl Ernst, SA General
- Georg Escherich, German politician
- Hermann Esser, Vice President of the Reichstag
- Nikolaus von Falkenhorst, German Army General
- Hermann Fegelein, SS General
- Werner von Fichte, SA General
- Richard Fiedler, SS General
- Heinrich-Georg Graf Finck von Finckenstein, SA General
- Hans Frank, Governor-General of Poland/SA General
- Karl Hermann Frank, SS General
- Fritz Freitag, SS General
- Wessel Freytag von Loringhoven, German Army Colonel
- Helmuth Friedrichs, SS General
- Hermann Foertsch, German Army General
- Johann Baptist Fuchs, SA General
- Wilhelm Fuchs, SS Colonel
- Fritz Fullriede, German Army General
- Wolfgang Fürstner, German Army Captain
- Herbert Fust, SA General
- Karl Gebhardt, SS General
- Hans Ferdinand Geisler, Luftwaffe General
- Richard Glücks, SS General
- Wilhelm Göcke, SS Colonel
- Ellery von Gorrissen, SS Lieutenant Colonel
- Curt von Gottberg, SS General
- Ulrich Grauert, Luftwaffe General
- Ernst-Robert Grawitz, SS General
- Heinz Greiner, German Army General
- Arthur Greiser, NSDAP Gauleiter of Wartheland/SS General
- Adam Grünewald, SS Major
- Heinz Guderian, German Army General
- Prince Gustav of Thurn and Taxis, Thule Society member
- Hans Hahne, German Army General
- Wilhelm Harster, SS General
- Paul Hausser, SS General
- Franz Hayler, SS General
- Hans Hayn, SA General
- Richard Heidrich, Luftwaffe General
- Edmund Heines, Deputy SA Chief-of-Staff
- Gotthard Heinrici, German Army General
- Werner Heisenberg, German physicist
- August Heissmeyer, SS General
- Wolf-Heinrich Graf von Helldorf, SA General
- Konrad Henlein, NSDAP Gauleiter of Sudetenland/SS General
- Paul Hennicke, SS General
- Eberhard Herf, SS General
- Maximilian von Herff, SS General
- Otto Herzog, SA General and Stabsführer
- Rudolf Hess, Deputy Führer
- Reinhard Heydrich, SS General
- Peter von Heydebreck, SA General
- Konstantin Hierl, NSDAP Reichsleiter
- Ernst-Albrecht Hildebrandt, SS Colonel
- Friedrich Hildebrandt, NSDAP Gauleiter of Mecklenburg/SS General
- Richard Hildebrandt, SS General
- Gebhard Ludwig Himmler, SS Colonel
- Heinrich Himmler, Reichsführer-SS
- Hans Hinkel, SS General
- Paul Hinkler, NSDAP Gauleiter of Halle-Merseburg
- Kurt Hintze, SS General
- Rudolf Hoess, SS Lieutenant Colonel/Kommandant of Auschwitz
- Karl Höfer, SS General
- Hermann Höfle, SS General
- Franz Ritter von Hörauf, SA General
- Hans Georg Hofmann, SA General
- Otto Hofmann, SS General
- Paul Hofmann, NSDAP Gauleiter of Magdeburg-Anhalt
- Hans Albert Hohnfeldt, NSDAP Gauleiter of Danzig
- Hermann Hoth, German Army General
- Adolf Hühnlein, NSDAP Reichsleiter/NSKK-Korpsführer/SA General
- Bernhard von Hülsen, German Army General
- Hans Hüttig, SS Major
- Friedrich Gustav Jaeger, German Army Colonel
- Friedrich Jeckeln, SS General
- Hans Jeschonnek, Luftwaffe General
- Ferdinand Jodl, German Army General
- Rudolf Jordan, NSDAP Gauleiter of Halle-Merseburg/SA General
- Josias, Hereditary Prince of Waldeck and Pyrmont, SS General
- Edgar Julius Jung, German lawyer
- Hans Jüttner, SS General
- Max Jüttner, SA General
- Richard Kaaserer, SS General
- Walther Kadow, German schoolteacher
- Ernst Kaltenbrunner, SS General
- Hans Kammler, SS General
- Ernst Kantorowicz, Medieval historian
- Siegfried Kasche, Nazi Ambassador/SA General
- Karl Kaufmann, NSDAP Gauleiter of Hanover/SS General
- Kurt Kaul, SS General
- Wilhelm Keitel, German Army Field Marshal
- Werner Kempf, German Army General
- Ulrich Kessler, Luftwaffe General
- Dr. Emil Ketterer, SA General
- Manfred Freiherr von Killinger, SS General
- Matthias Kleinheisterkamp, SS General
- Paul Ludwig Ewald von Kleist, German Field Marshal
- Waldemar Klingelhöfer, SS Major
- Hans Ulrich Klintzsch, Supreme SA Leader
- Erich Koch, NSDAP Gauleiter of East Prussia/SA General
- Hans-Karl Koch, SA General
- Paul Körner, SS General
- Gerret Korsemann, SS General
- Erwin Kraus, NSKK-Korpsführer
- Fritz Ritter von Kraußer, SA General
- Albert Krebs, NSDAP Gauleiter of Hamburg
- Heinrich Kreipe, German Army General
- Hermann Kriebel, NSDAP supporter
- Friedrich-Wilhelm Krüger, SS General
- Walter Krüger, SS General
- Georg von Küchler, German Army Field Marshal
- Otto Lancelle, German Army General
- Friedrich Landfried, German lawyer, State Secretary and Luftwaffe Major
- Otto Lasch, German Army General
- Johann von Leers, SS Major and Propaganda Ministry official
- Karl Lenz, NSDAP Gauleiter of Hesse-Darmstadt
- Arthur Liebehenschel, SS Officer
- Georg Lindemann, German Army General
- Karl Linder, NSDAP Gauleiter of Hesse-Nassau
- Wilhelm List, German Army Field Marshal
- Wilhelm Friedrich Loeper, NSDAP Gauleiter of Magdeburg-Anhalt/SS General
- Bruno Loerzer, Luftwaffe General
- Werner Lorenz, SS General
- Walther von Lüttwitz, German Army General
- Viktor Lutze, SA Chief-of-Staff
- Max Luyken, SA General
- Eberhard von Mackensen, German Army General
- Waldemar Magunia, SA Senior Colonel
- Johann-Erasmus Freiherr von Malsen-Ponickau, SS General
- Hasso von Manteuffel, German Army General
- Erich Marcks, German Army General
- Benno Martin, SS General
- Emil Maurice, first Supreme SA Leader/SS Colonel
- Karl Mauss, German General
- Josef Albert Meisinger, SS Colonel
- Günther Merk, SS General
- Erhard Milch, Luftwaffe Field Marshal
- Rudolf Mildner, SS Colonel
- Paul Moder, SS General
- Elhard von Morozowicz, Der Stahlhelm official and SA General
- Thomas Müller, SS Colonel
- Eugen Munder, NSDAP Gauleiter of Württemberg
- Max Näther, World War I ace
- Georg von Neufville, SA General and German Army General
- Hermann Niehoff, German Army General
- Friedrich T. Noltenius, World War I ace
- Carl Oberg, SS General
- Karl von Oberkamp, SS General
- Waldemar Pabst, ordered the executions of Rosa Luxemburg and Karl Liebknecht
- Günther Pancke, SS General
- Rudolf Pannier, SS Colonel
- Helmuth von Pannwitz, German Army General/SS General
- Friedrich Paulus, German Army Field Marshal
- Heinz Pernet, SA General
- Franz Pfeffer von Salomon, Supreme SA Leader
- Horst von Pflugk-Harttung, German intelligence officer and spy
- Oswald Pohl, SS General
- Maximilian Ritter von Pohl, Luftwaffe General
- Werner Preuss, World War I ace
- Hans-Adolf Prützmann, SS General
- Carl Friedrich von Pückler-Burghauss, SA and SS General
- Karl-Jesko von Puttkamer, German Navy Admiral
- Hermann-Bernhard Ramcke, Luftwaffe General
- Hans Ramshorn, SA General
- Johann Rattenhuber, SS General
- Hanns Albin Rauter, SS General
- Eggert Reeder, SS General
- Walter von Reichenau, German Army Field Marshal
- Heinz Reinefarth, SS General
- Heinrich Reiner, NSDAP Deputy Gauleiter of Hesse-Nassau
- Bolko von Richthofen, German archaeologist and Ahnenerbe member
- Hans-Joachim Riecke, SS General
- Ernst August Rode, SS General
- Manfred Roeder, Luftwaffe General and military judge
- Arthur Rödl, SS Colonel
- Ernst Röhm, SA Chief-of-Staff
- Beppo Römer, KPD member
- Gotthard Sachsenberg, World War I ace
- Theo Saevecke, SS Captain
- Ernst von Salomon, Organisation Consul member
- Ferdinand von Sammern-Frankenegg, SS Officer
- Dietrich von Saucken, German Army General
- Emanuel Schäfer, SS Colonel
- Julius Schaub, SS General
- Hans Schemm, an NSDAP Gauleiter in Bavaria
- Julian Scherner, SS Colonel
- Walter Schimana, SS General
- Albert Leo Schlageter, anti-French saboteur
- Fritz Schlessmann, NSDAP Acting Gauleiter of Essen/SS General
- Wilhelm Schmalz, German Army General
- Wilhelm Schmid, SA General
- August Schmidthuber, SS General
- Erich Schmiedicke, NSDAP Deputy Gauleiter of Berlin and Brandenburg
- Philipp Johann Adolf Schmitt, SS Major
- Rudolf Schmundt, German Army General
- Otto Schniewind, German Navy Admiral
- Eugen Ritter von Schobert, German Army General
- Carl-August von Schoenebeck, Luftwaffe General
- Fritz von Scholz, SS General
- Karl Eberhard Schöngarth, SS General
- Ferdinand Schörner, German Army Field Marshal
- Konrad Schragmüller, SA General
- Julius Schreck, first Reichsführer-SS
- Walther Schröder, SS General
- Walther Schultze, SS General
- Erwin Schulz, SS General
- Paul Schulz, NSDAP Organization Department Head
- Horst Schumann, SS Major
- Rudolf von Sebottendorf, founder of the Thule Society
- Hans Seidemann, Luftwaffe General
- Franz Seldte, Reich Minister for Labor/SA General
- Emil Sembach, SS Colonel
- Max Simon, SS General
- Friedrich Sixt, German Army General
- Otto Skorzeny, SS Lieutenant Colonel
- Hugo Sperrle, Luftwaffe Field Marshal
- Jakob Sporrenberg, SS General
- Franz Walter Stahlecker, SS General
- Albert Stange, Nazi politician and police official
- Felix Steiner, SS General
- Walter Stennes, SA General
- Lothar Steuer, Reichstag member
- Hermann Stieve, German physician
- Gregor Strasser, NSDAP Organization Leader
- Otto Strasser, NSDAP publisher and journalist
- Bruno Streckenbach, SS General
- Wilhelm Stuckart, SS General
- Karl von Le Suire, German Army General
- Günther Tamaschke, SS Colonel
- Theobald Thier, SS General
- Harald Turner, SS General
- Friedrich Uebelhoer, SS General
- Rudolf Veiel, German Army General
- Josef Veltjens, Luftwaffe Colonel
- Otmar Freiherr von Verschuer, German geneticist and eugenicist
- Hans Voss, German Navy Admiral
- Hans-Erich Voss, German Navy Admiral
- Hilmar Wäckerle, SS Colonel
- Otto Wagener, German Army General
- Walter Warlimont, German Army General
- Christian Weber, SS General
- Dr. Friedrich Weber, SS General
- Rudolf Weiß (SS-Mitglied) SS General
- Walther Wenck, German Army General
- Richard Wendler, SS General
- Otto Winkelmann, SS General
- Karl Wolff, SS General
- Udo von Woyrsch, SS General
- Alfred Wünnenberg, Chief of the Order Police/SS General
- Philipp Wurzbacher , SA General
- Karl Zech, SS General
- Carltheo Zeitschel, SS Major
- Carl Zenner, SS General
- Alexander Zenzes, World War I Ace
