= Otto Hofmann =

Nazi German SS general (1896–1982)

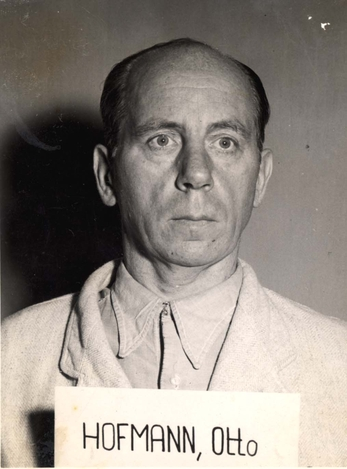
- Hofmann, in U.S. custody, c. 1945–48
- Born: Otto Ludwig Karl Adam Hofmann; 16 March 1896; Innsbruck, County of Tyrol, Austria-Hungary
- Died: 31 December 1982 (aged 86); Bad Mergentheim, Baden-Württemberg, West Germany
- Status: Deceased
- Motive: Nazism
- Convictions: Crimes against humanity War crimes Membership in a criminal organization
- Trial: RuSHA trial
- Penalty: 25 years imprisonment; commuted to 15 years imprisonment

Chief, SS Race and Settlement Main Office
- In office 9 July 1940 – 20 April 1943
- Preceded by: Günther Pancke
- Succeeded by: Richard Hildebrandt

Higher SS and Police Leader Southwest Germany
- In office 20 April 1943 – 8 May 1945
- Preceded by: Kurt Kaul
- Succeeded by: Position abolished

Military service
- Allegiance: German Empire; Nazi Germany
- Branch/service: Royal Bavarian Army; Schutzstaffel
- Rank: Leutnant; SS-Obergruppenführer
- Unit: Reserve Field Artillery Regiment 8
- Awards: Iron Cross, 1st and 2nd class War Merit Cross with Swords,1st and 2nd class Military Merit Order of Bavaria, 3rd and 4th class with Swords

Otto Hofmann (16 March 1896 – 31 December 1982) was a German SS-Obergruppenführer in Nazi Germany who was the head of the SS Race and Settlement Main Office. He participated in the January 1942 Wannsee Conference, at which the genocidal Final Solution to the Jewish Question was planned. Sentenced to 25 years in prison at the RuSHA Trial in March 1948 for war crimes and crimes against humanity, Hofmann was released in April 1954.

== Early life ==
Hofmann was born in Innsbruck, Tyrol, the son of a merchant. After he moved to Bavaria at age eight, he was educated in the Volksschule and the Theresien-Gymnasium in Munich but did not complete his studies. At the outbreak of the First World War in August 1914, he volunteered for service with the Royal Bavarian Army at Landsberg am Lech and, from January 1915, saw front-line service with Reserve Field Artillery Regiment 8. In March 1917, he was promoted to Leutnant and was assigned as an observer and a liaison officer to an Austro-Hungarian fighter unit. On 20 June 1917, he was shot down over Romania and taken prisoner by the Russians. However, he escaped from captivity after five weeks and returned to the German lines. He completed basic pilot training and was assigned to a reserve pilot unit before he was discharged in March 1919, having earned the Iron Cross, 1st and 2nd class and the Military Merit Order of Bavaria 3rd and 4th class with Swords.

Hofmann saw short-term service as an artilleryman in a Freikorps unit at the Bavarian-Czech border between April and October 1919. Married since July 1918, he entered civilian life in 1920 as a salesman in his father-in-law's wholesale wine business at Nuremberg. In 1925, after divorcing his wife, he started his own business as an independent representative for several large wine companies from Germany and abroad. In April 1923, Hofmann became an early member of the Nazi Party, which was soon banned in the wake of the Beer Hall Putsch. After the Party was refounded in early 1925, Hofmann did not rejoin until 1 August 1929 (membership number 145,729). However, as an Alter Kampfer, he later would be awarded the Golden Party Badge.

== SS Career in Nazi Germany ==
On 1 April 1931, Hofmann joined the Schutzstaffel (SS member number: 7,646). By December, he had been commissioned as an officer and placed in charge of the motorized unit of SS-Standarte 3 in Nuremberg. In September 1932, he advanced to head all the motorized units of SS-Abschnitt (District) IX, also in Nuremberg. Shortly after the Nazi seizure of power, he left his wine business in April 1933 when he became a full-time SS functionary, attached to SS-Gruppe Süd in Munich as adjutant to the chief of the auxiliary political police. He remained in that post until becoming the chief-of-staff of SS-Oberabschnitt (Main District) Nordwest, headquartered in Hamburg. On 15 March 1934, he received his own command as Führer of SS-Standarte 21 in Magdeburg followed by a return to Hamburg as commander of SS-Standarte 28 on 2 April 1935. This was quickly followed by promotion to head SS-Abschnitt XV in Hamburg from 25 May 1935 to 1 January 1937. During this time, he also unsuccessfully sought to secure a slot for the 29 March 1936 election to the Reichstag. He would again fail in his bid to become a Reichstag deputy in the election of 10 April 1938.

=== SS Race and Settlement Main Office ===
On 1 January 1937, Hofmann was assigned to the SS Race and Settlement Main Office (RuSHA), becoming its training officer for SS-Oberabschnitt West in Düsseldorf. The RuSHA was the section that safeguarded the "racial purity" of the SS by researching the genealogy of SS recruits. On 2 February 1939, Hofmann became head of the Ancestry Office (Sippenamt) in RuSHA headquarters in Berlin. In this position, he headed the unit that conducted the investigations into the racial background of SS applicants, as well as of the prospective spouses of SS members prior to granting approvals for marriage. On 17 July, he was made deputy to the RuSHA Chief, SS-Obergruppenführer Günther Pancke and, after the outbreak of the Second World War on 1 September, he virtually ran the entire organization due to Pancke being occupied with duties in Poland. On 16 December, Hofmann also took control as head of the RuSHA Race Office (Rassenamt). He was named Pancke's successor as RuSHA Chief on 9 July 1940, and was appointed to hold the post "for the duration of the war". Hofmann also assumed the co-editorship of the journal Der Biologe (The Biologist), the chief publication of the Reich Biology League.

=== Germanisation and Holocaust Involvement ===
As RuSHA chief, Hofmann played a leading role in the "Germanisation" of the captured territory of Poland and the Soviet Union. This involved the resettling of Germans in the Nazi-occupied eastern territories and ejecting the native families from those lands. Hoffman also was responsible for conducting official race tests on the population of the occupied territories for racial categorization and selection. His office was also responsible for the abduction of Eastern European children who demonstrated "racially acceptable traits". These children would be taken to Germany to be raised as Germans, or to be used as forced labourers. Hofmann arranged forced household-help arrangements for several friends and Party comrades, and even retained the services of one of these children in his own household, boasting in a letter to a friend: "I myself employ a young Polish girl, a re-Germanization candidate, who we can only keep under control by treating her strictly."

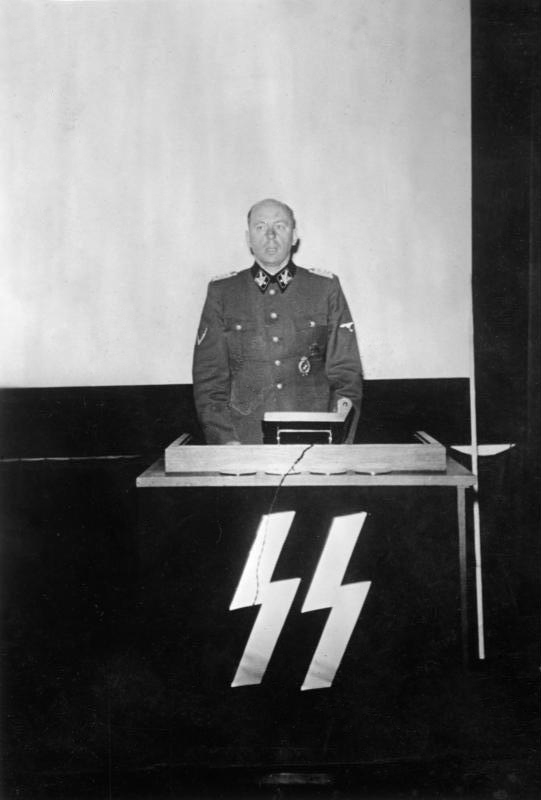
Hofmann in July 1942

Hofmann was a participant at the Wannsee Conference on 20 January 1942, called to develop plans for the implementation of the so-called "Final Solution to the Jewish Question". He knew many of the other attendees, including SS-Obergruppenführer Reinhard Heydrich, who chaired the meeting and with whom Hofmann had previously worked on issues of Germanisation in the occupied eastern territories. Moreover, Hofmann's RuSHA office for years had compiled and maintained an index of individuals with partly Jewish origins, in order to assist in tracking down such persons not only in Germany but in other areas of Europe. Hofmann was not a passive attendee at the conference but put forward his own suggestions on some issues. On the issue of launching the final solution in Hungary, for example, he offered to send personnel from his office to assist with orientation when the time came. By getting RuSHA involved, he aimed to ensure that the extermination program was conducted as thoroughly as possible from a racial selection perspective. He also advocated sterilization for so-called "first-degree Mischling", that is, individuals with two Jewish grandparents. He also later opposed treating as Germans the so called "second-degree Mischling", that is, individuals with only one Jewish grandparent. Instead, he proposed subjecting them to a racial inspection by RuSHA and, if they displayed what he termed "prominent racial characteristics", they would be treated as "first-degree Mischling".

=== Higher SS and Police Leader ===
On 21 June 1942, Hofmann was granted membership in the Waffen-SS with the rank of Generalleutnant. During the war years, the pressures of increased recruitment for the Waffen-SS meant that RuSHA had to limit its background investigations to officers and their spouses or fiancées. The expanded numbers of settlers to the eastern territories also added an increased burden. When his organization had difficulty keeping up with the volume of racial examinations due to a lack of manpower, Hofmmann was removed as RuSHA Chief by Reichsführer-SS Heinrich Himmler on 20 April 1943, and he was transferred to Stuttgart as the chief of SS-Oberabschnitt Südwest and the Higher SS and Police Leader (HSSPF) for southwestern Germany (Gau Württemberg-Hohenzollern and Gau Baden-Alsace). He was also made head of the police section in the Württemberg Interior Ministry. In his new positions, he had supervisory custody of all the prisoners of war in Wehrkreis (Military District) V. On 21 June 1943, he was promoted to SS-Obergruppenführer und General der Polizei, followed on 1 July 1944 by the additional designation of General der Waffen-SS. He had now advanced to the highest levels of the SS military and police hierarchy but, on 29 November 1944, he was reprimanded for cowardice by Himmler, who accused him of an overly hasty retreat before the US Army's assault on Alsace.

== SS and police ranks ==
SS and police ranks
Date	Rank
21 December 1931	SS-Sturmführer
9 September 1932	SS-Hauptsturmführer
30 January 1933	SS-Sturmbannführer
1 January 1934	SS-Obersturmbannführer
20 April 1934	SS-Standartenführer
15 September 1935	SS-Oberführer
10 September 1939	SS-Brigadeführer
20 April 1941	SS-Gruppenführer
21 June 1942	Generalleutnant der Waffen-SS
21 June 1943	SS-Obergruppenführer und General der Polizei
1 July 1944	General der Waffen-SS

== Post war life and prosecutions ==
In the last weeks of fighting, Hofmann fled from Stuttgart around 19 April 1945, taking refuge with the 19th Army in Pfunds in the Tyrol until it capitulated in the first week of May. He then destroyed his uniform and identity card and, making his way to Munich, went underground where he hid out with the assistance of his father and a family friend. After two months, he turned himself in on 8 July 1945 and was arrested by members of the US Counterintelligence Corps. Hofmann was indicted by the US Military Tribunal on 1 July 1947 and put on trial at Nuremberg on 20 October 1947 at the so called RuSHA Trial. He was charged with crimes against humanity, war crimes and membership in a criminal organization. On 10 March 1948, he was found guilty on all counts and was sentenced to 25 years in prison, which was reduced to 15 years on 21 January 1951 by US High Commissioner John J. McCloy. On 7 April 1954, Hofmann was released from Landsberg Prison. Thereafter, he settled in Künzelsau, Baden-Württemberg and worked as a commercial clerk.

Between 1959 and 1982, Hofmann was questioned several times again during preliminary investigations into crimes of the Nazi era. In two instances, the investigations led to criminal proceedings being initiated against him. The first was a case in 1959–60 brought by the public prosecutor in Heilbronn, charging him with extrajudicial killings in the Natzweiler-Struthof concentration camp when he was HSSPF in Stuttgart. The second was an investigation in 1982 into the Wannsee Conference participants by the Stuttgart prosecutor. However, Hofmann's prior convictions prevented the prosecution from trying him again for the same crimes, so he was limited to being questioned as a witness. Both cases were eventually dismissed, and Hofmann died in Bad Mergentheim on 31 December 1982.

== Film portrayals ==
Hofmann was portrayed by Robert Atzorn in the German film Die Wannseekonferenz (1984), by Nicholas Woodeson in the BBC/HBO film Conspiracy (2001) and by Markus Schleinzer in the German film Die Wannseekonferenz (2022).

== Sources ==
- Heinemann, Isabel (2017). "Otto Hofmann: SS Race and Settlement Main Office. A Pragmatic Enforcer of Racial Policy?". In Jasch, Hans-Christian; Kreutzmüller, Christoph (eds.). The Participants: The Men of the Wannsee Conference. Berghahn Books. ISBN 978-1-785-33671-3.
- McNab, Chris (2009). The SS: 1923–1945. London: Amber Books. ISBN 978-1-906-62649-5.
- Miller, Michael D.; Schulz, Andreas (2015). Leaders of the SS & German Police. Vol. 2 Reichsführer SS – Gruppenführer (Hans Haltermann to Walter Kruger). R. James Bender Publishing. ISBN 978-1-932-97025-8.
- Williams, Max (2015). SS Elite: The Senior Leaders of Hitler's Praetorian Guard. Vol. 1. Fonthill Media LLC. ISBN 978-1-781-55433-3.
