= Abercron =

Abercron is a surname. Notable people with the surname include:

- Hugo von Abercron (1869–1945), German officer, major general, balloonist, and non-fiction author
- Michael von Abercron (born 1952), German agricultural engineer and politician
