= Waldemar Klingelhöfer =

German Holocaust perpetrator (1900–1977)

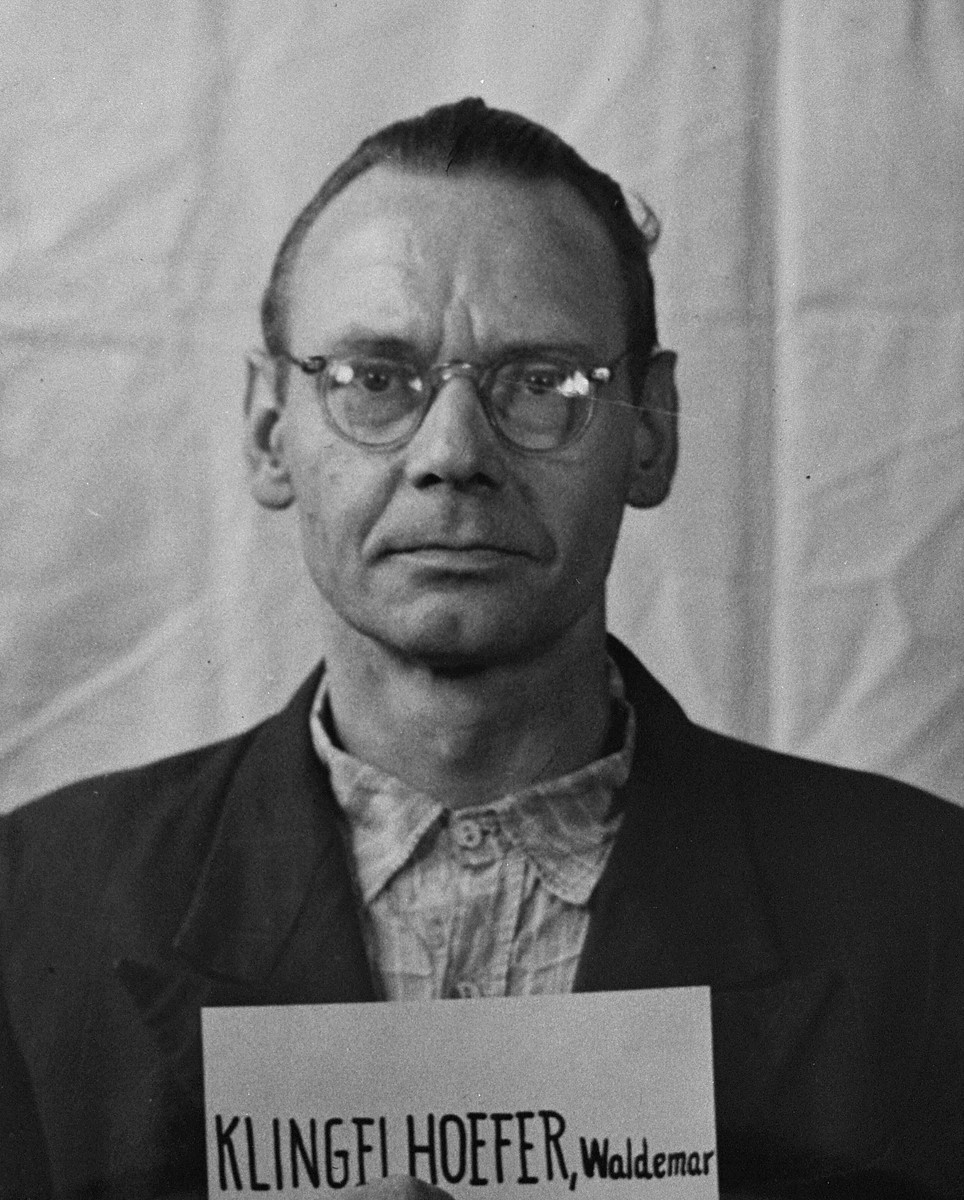
- Klingelhöfer's mugshot after his indictment for the Nuremberg Military Tribunal (July 1947)
- Born: 4 April 1900; Moscow, Moscow Governorate, Russian Empire
- Died: 18 January 1977 (aged 76); Villingen-Schwenningen, Baden-Württemberg, West Germany
- Occupations: Opera singer, Nazi official, office clerk
- Status: Deceased
- Motive: Nazism
- Convictions: Crimes against humanity War crimes Membership in a criminal organization
- Trial: Einsatzgruppen trial
- Penalty: Death; commuted to life imprisonment

Waldemar Karl Julius Nikolai Klingelhöfer (4 April 1900 — 18 January 1977) was an SS-Sturmbannführer and convicted war criminal.

== Early life ==
Klingelhöfer was born in Moscow as the son of a funeral director of German origins. Waldemar Klingelhöfer attended school in Kassel, served in the German army from June–December 1918 and after the war studied music and voice. He gave concerts throughout Germany and later received a State's Certificate as a voice teacher. In 1935, he became an opera singer.

== Nazi career ==
In the 1920s, Klingelhöfer joined the Freikorps Roßbach, a Freikorps organised by Gerhard Roßbach. In 1937, he took over the Department of Culture, a branch of the Security Service (Sicherheitsdienst, or SD), office SD III-C in Kassel. In 1941, he was assigned to Einsatzgruppe B as a Russian interpreter. This Einsatzgruppe—already by November 1941, according to its own Status Report No. 133—had killed 45,467 persons.

By 26 October, Vorkommando Moscow—a part of Einsatzgruppe B—and the group staff had executed 2,457 persons, including 572 people killed between 28 September and 26 October 1941, while Klingelhöfer was in command. Klingelhöfer witnessed executions and carried out others. For example, he shot 30 Jews who had left a ghetto without permission. Klingelhöfer later claimed he did this on the orders of Arthur Nebe to make an example out of the victims, then contradicted himself by saying that three women had contacted some partisans, then returned to the town and spoke with the Jews. This, according to Klingelhöfer, made the Jews partisans and therefore subject to being shot. The three women Klingelhöfer also shot, but—unlike the Jews—he blindfolded them and buried them in a separate grave.

== War crimes trial ==
At trial, Klingelhöfer claimed that his only role in the Einsatzgruppe was that of interpreter. This contention was rejected by the court, on the grounds that even if it were true, as an interpreter, his tasks included locating, evaluating and forwarding to the Einsatzgruppe command lists of Communist party functionaries. Because—according to his own testimony—he knew the people would be executed when found, this made him an accessory to the crime.

Beyond this, the tribunal found that Klingelhöfer was not just an interpreter, but an active leader and commander, who knew what the Einsatz units were doing to the Jews. According to Klingelhöfer's own affidavit, he had been appointed by Arthur Nebe to lead Vorkommando Moscow:

While I was assigned by Nebe to the leadership of the Vorkommando Moscow, Nebe ordered me to go from Smolensk to Tatarsk and Mstislavl to get furs for the German troops and to liquidate part of the Jews there. The Jews had already been arrested by order of Hauptsturmführer Egon Noack. The executions proper were carried out by Noack under my supervision.

The Einsatzgruppen operated with the assumption that a Führer order (Führerbefehl) existed that provided for and required the mass murder of Jews, Gypsies and others whom the Nazis did not deem racially worthy. Although Klingelhöfer stated several times during his testimony that he was morally opposed to the Führer Order, the court found that he went along quite willingly with it. Klingelhöfer was unrepentant about the necessity for the war:

Before leaving the witness stand he stated that he would have been happy for Hitler to win the war even at the expense of its present condition with two million Germans killed, the nation in utter ruins, and all of Europe devastated. This statement has no bearing, of course, on the question of his guilt under counts one and two, but it is helpful in determining the state of mind as to whether he obeyed the so-called superior orders with a full heart or not.
The Tribunal finds from all the evidence that the defendant accepted the Führer Order without reservation and that he executed it without truce.

== Death sentence and reprieve ==
On 10 April 1948, Klingelhöfer was sentenced to death in the Einsatzgruppen Trial. In 1951, under intense political pressure, U.S. High Commissioner John J. McCloy commuted Klingelhöfer's sentence—and those of three other Einsatzgruppen defendants—to life imprisonment. On 12 December 1956, Klingelhöfer was released from Landsberg Prison on parole. In 1960, he lived in Villingen and worked as an office clerk.
