= SS Race and Settlement Main Office =

SS department in Nazi Germany

- Rasse- und Siedlungshauptamt der SS

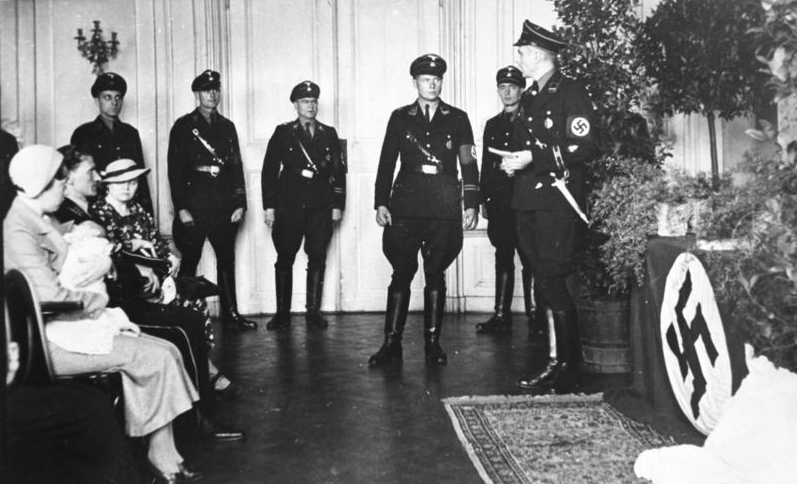
- SS naming ceremony for a child born through the RuSHA's Lebensborn program in 1936

Agency overview
- Formed: c. 1931
- Dissolved: 8 May 1945
- Jurisdiction: Germany; German-occupied Europe
- Headquarters: SS Main Office, Prinz-Albrecht-Straße, Berlin
- Employees: 1,500 (c. 1942)
- Minister responsible: Reichsführer-SS Heinrich Himmler, (1931–1945)
- Agency executives: Walther Darré, 1931–1938; Günther Pancke, 1938–1940; Otto Hofmann, 1940–1943; Richard Hildebrandt, 1943–1945
- Parent agency: (Schutzstaffel) Allgemeine SS

The SS Race and Settlement Main Office (Rasse- und Siedlungshauptamt der SS, RuSHA) was the organization responsible for "safeguarding the racial purity of the SS" within Nazi Germany.

One of its duties was to oversee the marriages of SS personnel in accordance with the racial policy of Nazi Germany. After Heinrich Himmler introduced the "marriage order" on 31 December 1931, the RuSHA would only issue a permit to marry once detailed background investigations into the racial fitness of both prospective parents had been completed and proved both of them to be of Aryan descent back to 1800.

== Formation ==
The RuSHA was founded in 1931 by Reichsführer-SS Heinrich Himmler and Richard Walther Darré, who later rose to the rank of SS-Obergruppenführer. In 1935, it was upgraded to an SS Main Office. Under its first director, Darré, it propagated the Nazi ideology of blood and soil. Darré was dismissed by Himmler in 1938 and was succeeded by SS-Gruppenführer Günther Pancke, SS-Gruppenführer Otto Hofmann in 1940, and then SS-Obergruppenführer Richard Hildebrandt in 1943.

The RuSHA was created in part to monitor Himmler's 1931 order that the marital decisions of unmarried SS men should be supervised by the Nazi state. SS men would thereafter have to apply for a marriage permit three months before getting married so that the parents of the fiancée could be investigated to ensure her racial purity. With time, the marriage laws became less strict. Thereafter, in December 1935 Himmler ordered the RuSHA to establish the Lebensborn network of maternity homes, whose purpose was "to accommodate and look after racially and genetically valuable expectant mothers." The RuSHA increasingly focused on processing SS marriage applications, genealogy, "racial-biological" investigations and the social welfare services of SS members.

== Organization ==
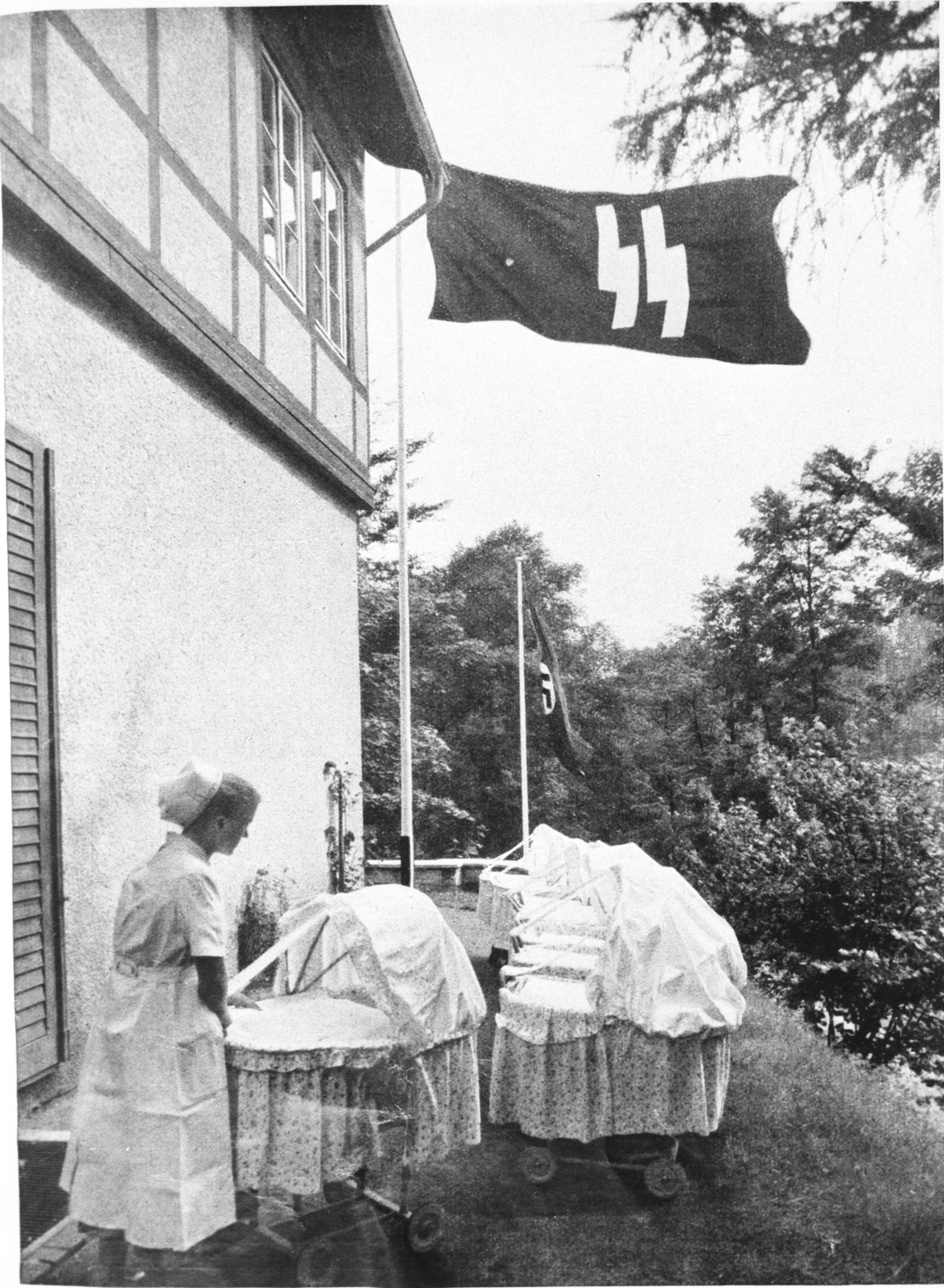
Babies born during the SS Lebensborn program in 1943

In 1935 the RuSHA consisted of seven departments (German: Ämter or Amtsgruppen):

- Amt Organisation und Verwaltungsamt (Organisation and Administration)
- Amt Rassenamt (Race)
- Amt Schulungsamt (Education)
- Amt Sippen und Heiratsamt (Family and Marriage)
- Amt Siedlungsamt (Settlement)
- Amt für Archiv und Zeitungswesen (Records and Press)
- Amt für Bevölkerungspolitik (Population Policy)

In 1940 it was reorganized to create four main departments:

- Verwaltungsamt (Administration Office).
- Rassenamt (Racial Office), it selected future SS personnel and conducted racial selections.
- Heiratsamt (Marriage Office) it controlled the selection of suitable wives by SS men.
- Siedlungsamt (Settlement Office), it dealt with the settlement of discharged SS men, especially in the annexed eastern areas.

The Race and Settlement Departments were further divided into the Hauptabteilungen (Main Branches). One of these managed welfare and pensions in cooperation with the SS-Hauptfürsorge- und Versorgungsamt (SS Main Welfare and Pension Department) at the Reich Ministry of the Interior.

=== Leadership ===
No.	Portrait	Chief of RuSHA	Took office	Left office	Time in office
1	Richard Walther Darré	SS-Gruppenführer; Richard Walther Darré (1895–1953)	1 January 1932	12 September 1938	6 years, 254 days
2	Günther Pancke	SS-Brigadeführer; Günther Pancke (1899–1973)	12 September 1938	9 July 1940	1 year, 301 days
3	Otto Hofmann	SS-Gruppenführer; Otto Hofmann (1896–1982)	9 July 1940	20 April 1943	2 years, 285 days
4	Richard Hildebrandt	SS-Obergruppenführer; Richard Hildebrandt (1897–1951)	20 April 1943	8 May 1945	2 years, 18 days

== Racial policies ==
By 1937 more than 300 men had been expelled from the SS for violating Nazi race laws (Rassenschande), although an order later stated that they could remain if they were already married and could satisfy racial criteria. In November 1940, Himmler reinstated all SS personnel expelled under the marriage laws, provided they met racial requirements of the Nazi Party.

Following the invasion of the Soviet Union in 1941, the RuSHA worked in partnership with VOMI in the Germanization of captured territory, monitoring of settler welfare, and the plantation of ethnic Germans in areas designated for settlement by the SS, particularly in occupied Ukraine. This involved, in part, the settling of Germans in the Nazi-occupied Eastern territories and ejecting the native families from those lands.

The RuSHA was also an advisory and executive office for all questions of racial selection. Racial examinations were performed by Rasse und Siedlungs (RUS) leaders or their racial examiners (Eignungsprüfer) in connection with:

- Cases where sexual intercourse had occurred between Eastern European POWs or workers and Germans
- Children born to Eastern European workers
- Classification of people of German descent
- Selection of enemy nationals, particularly Poles, for slave labour and Germanization
- Kidnapping of children suitable for Germanization
- Population transfers
- The persecution and liquidation of Jews

The RuSHA also employed Josef Mengele for a short time from November 1940 to early 1941, in Department II of its Family Office, where he was responsible for "care of genetic health" and "genetic health tests". He went on to become one of the team of doctors responsible for the selection of victims to be killed in the gas chambers and for performing deadly human experiments on prisoners at Auschwitz concentration camp.

== Postwar ==
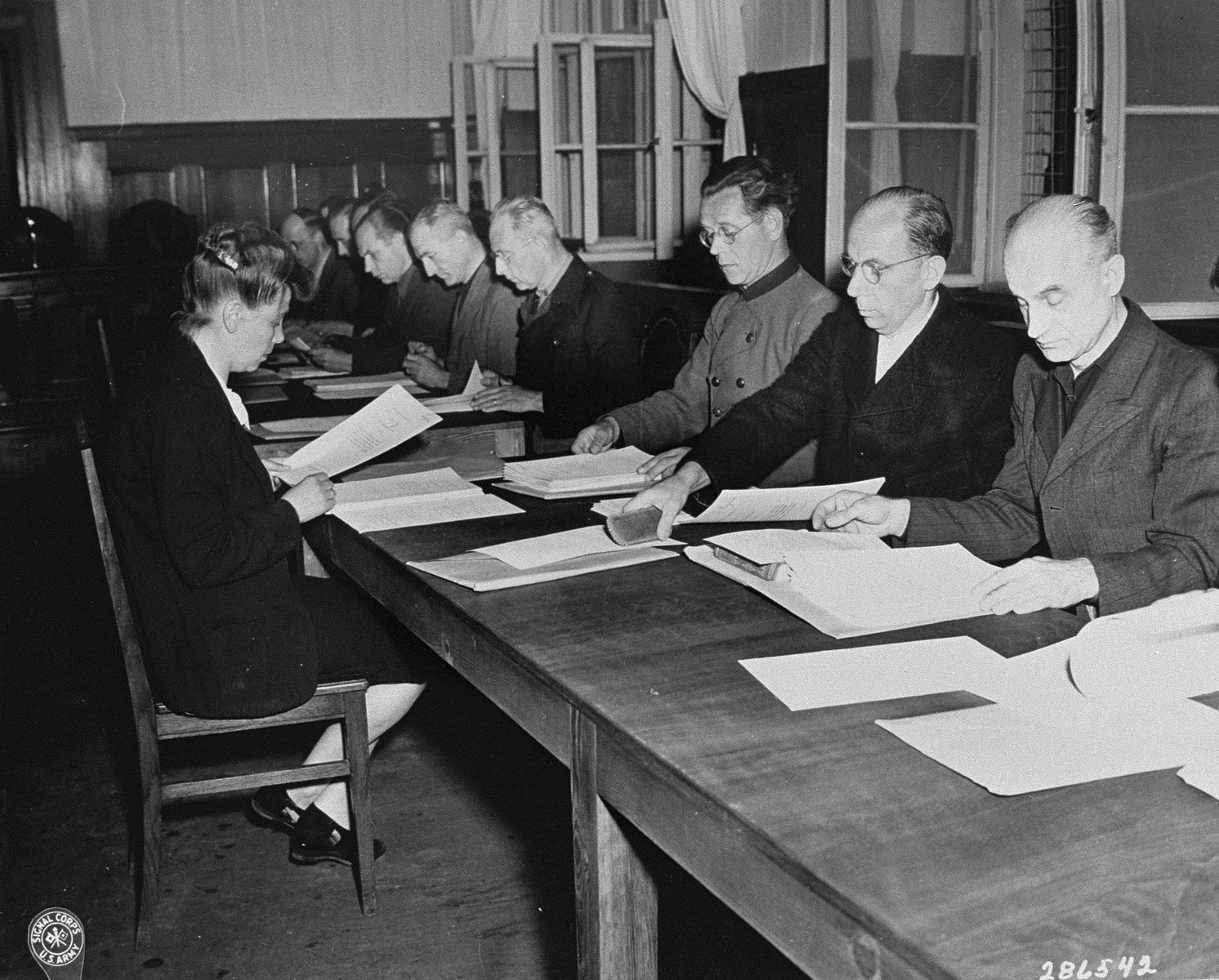
Some of the 14 defendants in the RuSHA Trial at Nuremberg read the indictments against them in July 1947.

In July 1947, 14 officials from the organization were indicted in the RuSHA Trial and tried by the Allied powers at Nuremberg. All were charged with crimes against humanity, war crimes and membership in a criminal organization (the SS). All but one (who was acquitted on the two more serious charges) were found guilty and sentenced to between three and 25 years imprisonment. Hildebrandt was convicted of war crimes and sentenced to 25 years imprisonment. He was then extradited to Poland and tried for his criminal actions there. He was convicted of war crimes and executed.

== See also ==
- Generalplan Ost – the Nazi plan to ethnically-cleanse occupied Eastern Europe.
- Office of Racial Policy
- Denordification

== Sources ==
- SS Collections: RuSHA (Rasse- und Siedlungshauptamt)
- Law Reports of Trials of War Criminals: United Nations War Crimes Commission. Wm. S. Hein Publishing. 1997. p. 5. ISBN 1-57588-403-8.
- Miller, Michael (2015). Leaders of the SS and German Police, Vol. 2. San Jose, CA: R. James Bender. ISBN 978-19-329-7025-8.
- Snyder, Louis (1994) [1976]. Encyclopedia of the Third Reich. Da Capo Press. ISBN 978-1-56924-917-8.
- Zentner, Christian; Bedürftig, Friedemann (1991). The Encyclopedia of the Third Reich. New York: MacMillan. ISBN 0-02-897500-6.
