= Krzywin, Gryfino County =

Krzywin
- Village
- Location within Poland
- Coordinates: 53°5′25″N 14°27′18″E
- Country: Poland
- Voivodeship: West Pomeranian
- County: Gryfino
- Gmina: Widuchowa
- Population: 730

Krzywin [ˈkʂɨvin] (German: Kehrberg) is a village in the administrative district of Gmina Widuchowa, within Gryfino County, West Pomeranian Voivodeship, in north-western Poland, close to the German border. It lies approximately 7 km (4 mi) south-east of Widuchowa, 18 km (11 mi) south of Gryfino, and 38 km (24 mi) south of the regional capital Szczecin.

For the history of the region, see History of Pomerania.

The village has a population of 730.

== Notable residents ==
- Gerhard Roßbach (1893–1967), Freikorps leader
