= Freikorps Roßbach =

Volunteer military force (Freikorps) in Germany from 1918 to 1933

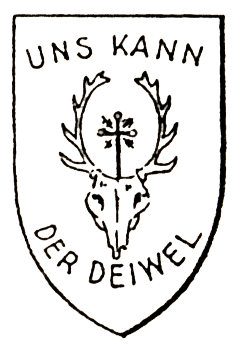
- Emblem of Freikorps Roßbach
- Active: 1918–1933
- Disbanded: November 9, 1933
- Country: Weimar Republic; Nazi Germany
- Allegiance: German Reich
- Branch: Reichswehr
- Type: Freikorps; Selbstschutz
- Role: Suppression of civil disorders and uprisings
- Part of: Grenzschutz Ost (1918–1919); Reichswehr (1919–1923)
- Motto: "Uns Kann Der Deiwel" - The Devil Can Take Us
- Engagements: Silesian Uprisings; Russian Civil War; German revolution of 1918–1919; Kapp Putsch; Ruhr Uprising; Beer Hall Putsch

Commanders
- Notable commanders: Gerhard Roßbach

Freikorps Roßbach (English: Rossbach Free Corps), also called the Freiwilligen-Sturmabteilung Roßbach, later designated as the 37. Jäger Battalion, was a voluntary paramilitary unit of the Weimar Republic which had its origins as a part of Grenzschutz Ost following the end of the First World War. Early components of Freikorps Roßbach fought in the Silesian Uprisings, the Russian Civil War, and were later used to suppress both the German Revolution of 1918–1919 and the Ruhr uprising. The unit later participated in the Kapp Putsch in 1920 and the Munich Putsch in 1923. The unit was commanded by Gerhard Roßbach, a veteran of the First World War, who was a foundational member of both the German Völkisch Freedom Party and later the Nazi Party.

== Formation ==
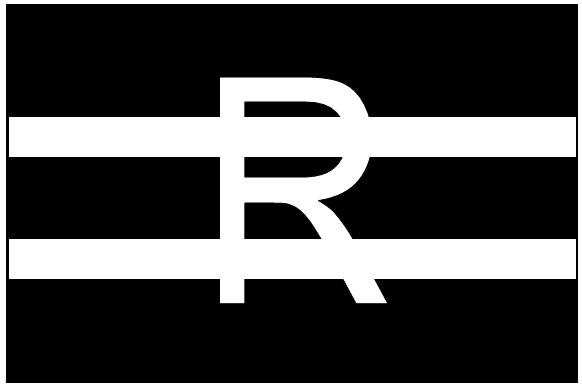
The original flag of Freiwilligen-Sturmabteilung Roßbach

Freikorps Roßbach was originally founded as Freiwillige Sturmabteilung Roßbach (English: Volunteer Assault Detachment Roßbach) during the winter of 1918–1919 by Gerhard Roßbach, then serving as a Lieutenant in the 175th (8th Prussian) Infantry Regiment as part of the Prussian Army. The unit was made up of remnants from Roßbach's machine gun training unit which was garrisoned in Graudenz. The unit fell under the command of the Selbstschutz Oberschlesien as part of the broader Grenzschutz Ost, which was tasked with securing the border of western Prussia against the newly established Second Polish Republic.

== Deployments ==
=== Silesia ===
Freikorps Roßbach was first deployed during the Silesian Uprisings in November of 1918 as part of Grenschutz Ost alongside Freikorps Paulssen and Freikorps von Aulock, each of which were named after their respective commanders. Freikorps Roßbach was eventually absorbed into the Provisional Reichswehr and designated as Jäger Battalion 37 (37. Jäger Battalion) at the beginning of 1919 following the Treaty of Versailles. In 1920 Freikorps Roßbach was re-deployed to Upper Silesia alongside units such as Freikorps Heydebreck, Freikorps von Arnim, Freikorps Horadam, Freikorps von Chappuis, and Freikorps von Aulock, among others. According to Canadian historian Robert G. L. Waite, during the Third Silesian Uprising "Rossbach organized and outfitted his men so effectively that within forty-eight hours after the outbreak of the Third Polish Revolt, he was able to send some four thousand men to join Heydebreck's Wehrwolfe and other "dissolved" formations in Upper Silesia". The units final deployment as a Freikorps in battle was during the Third Silesian Uprising.

=== The Baltic States ===
Freikorps Roßbach joined the Eiserne Division during the Russian Civil War in 1918 order to assist the West Russian Volunteer Army under the command of Pavel Bermondt-Avalov. During the unit's deployment to the Baltic states, Roßbach gained Erich Ludendorff's favor for an illegal 1,000 kilometre march through Latvia. During the conflict Roßbach's men were poorly equipped and often marched 40 miles (64.3738 km) per day.

=== Kapp Putsch ===
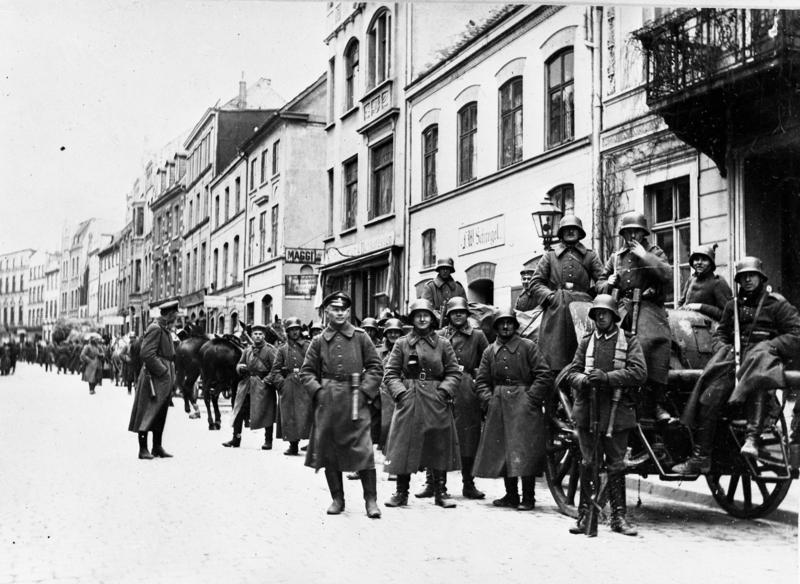
Troops of Freikorps Roßbach during the Kapp Putsch

Freikorps Roßbach actively took part in the Kapp Putsch, an abortive coup d'état attempt against the German national government. At the time Freikorps Roßbach was part of Wehrkreis VI under the command of General Oskar von Watter. Freikorps units under Watter's command included Freikorps Roßbach, Marine-Brigade von Loewenfeld, Freikorps Düsseldorf, and Freikorps von Aulock. Freikorps Roßbach took part in the coup on the side of the Putschists which supported Walther von Lüttwitz and Paul von Lettow-Vorbeck, two of the main orchestrators of the coup.

=== Rhur Uprising ===
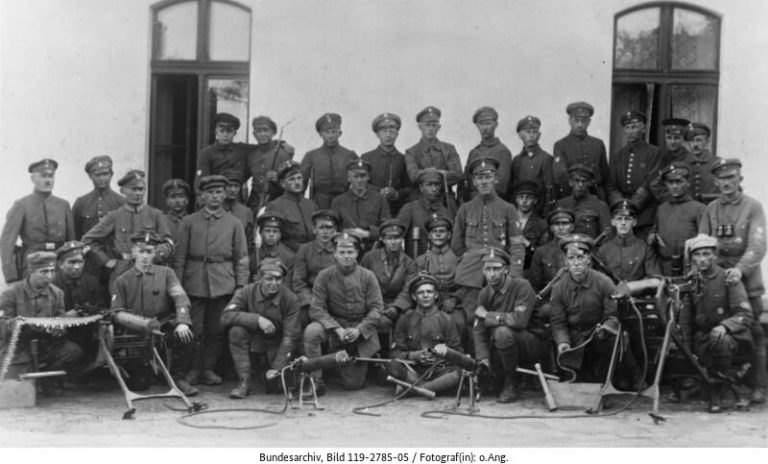
Members of Freikorps Roßbach pose for a group portrait in Essen, c.1920-1921

Freikorps Roßbach was deployed again during the Ruhr uprising under the overall command of the Reichswehr's 3rd Cavalry Division commanded by Maximilian von Weichs. The unit was deployed alongside the Sicherheitspolizei and other Freikorps including Freikorps Epp and Marine-Brigade von Loewenfeld.

== Later history and disbandment ==
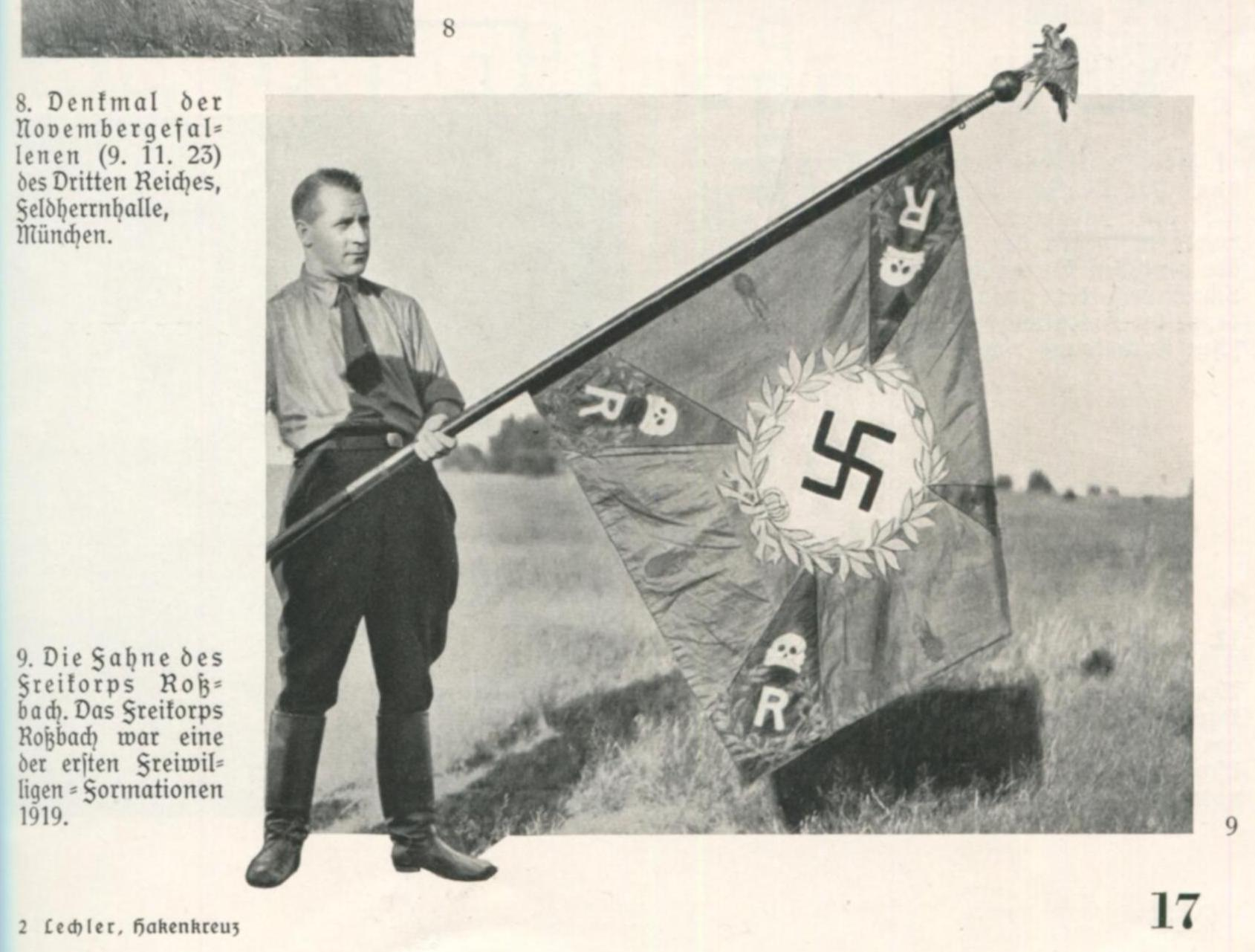
The later flag of the Roßbach Freikorps

In 1922 Roßbach was imprisoned for planning to overthrow the German government. Later, while living in Munich, Roßbach joined the Nazi Party and took part in the Beer Hall Putsch along with the rest of Freikorps Roßbach. Freikorps Roßbach was officially disbanded on November 9, 1933 during the tenth anniversary of the march on the Feldherrnhalle in memory of the Munich Putsch. Members of the now disbanded Freikorps joined various Bund organizations to stay in contact with fellow veterans, one of which was the Einwohnerwehr.

== Notable members ==
Several notable people served in Freikorps Roßbach during its history including:

- Edmund Heines
- Hans Ramshorn
- Erich Koch
- Kurt Daluege
- Wolf-Heinrich Graf von Helldorff
- Karl von Eberstein
- Rudolf Höss
- Max Henze
- Martin Bormann
- Waldemar Klingelhöfer
- Philipp Wurzbacher
- Hans Kammler
- Kurt Hintze
