= Philipp Wurzbacher =

German army and Sturmabteilung (SA) officer

Reichstag Deputy
- In office 5 March 1933 – 8 May 1945

Personal details
- Born: Johann Philipp Wurzbacher; May 26, 1898 Selbitz, Upper Franconia, Kingdom of Bavaria, German Empire
- Died: March 31, 1984 (aged 85) Altdorf bei Nürnberg, Bavaria, West Germany
- Party: Nazi Party
- Occupation: Businessman
- Awards: Golden Party Badge

Military service
- Allegiance: German Empire; Nazi Germany
- Branch/service: Imperial German Army; Freikorps; German Army
- Years of service: 1916–1919; 1939–1945
- Rank: Hauptmann
- Unit: 11th Bavarian Infantry Division
- Battles/wars: World War I World War II

Freikorps RoßbachJohann Philipp Wurzbacher (26 May 1898 – 31 March 1984) was a German Sturmabteilung (SA) officer who rose to the rank of SA-Brigadeführer. He was also a Nazi Party member of the Reichstag from electoral constituency 26 (Franconia) between March 1933 and 1945. He fought as an officer with the Wehrmacht for the duration of the Second World War. After the war, he remained imprisoned in labour camps until 1953.

== Early life ==
Wurzbacher was born as Johann Philipp Wurzbacher, the son of a factory weaver in Selbitz. He attended the local Volksschule and then a technical training school in Nuremberg. At age 18, he joined the Royal Bavarian Army and fought in the First World War. He was a member of a pioneer battalion from 1 December 1916 and then was transferred to a mortar company of the 11th Bavarian Infantry Division. He sustained a serious wound in 1917 and, after spending several months in a hospital, he returned to his unit.

After the end of the war, Wurzbacher was discharged from military service on 24 January 1919. In the immediate postwar period, Wurzbacher began to become active in extreme right-wing political circles, belonging to Freikorps Roßbach, the Organisation Consul, and the Viking League. During this time, Wurzbacher worked as an independent businessman (manufacturing and distributing hand embroidery), later as publishing director of the Völkischer Beobachter in Franconia.

== Marriage and family ==
Würzbacher was married and had two children. He lived in Nuremberg and Schwarzenbruck.

== Nazi Party career ==
Wurzbacher joined the Nazi Party for the first time on 21 October 1922. After the Party was banned in the wake of the Beer Hall Putsch in November 1923 and re-established in 1925, Wurzbacher rejoined on 8 August 8, 1927 (membership number 65,782). As an early Party member, he later would be awarded the Golden Party Badge. After the Franconian branch of the Party's paramilitary organization, the Sturmabteilung (SA), collapsed in 1928 due to internal conflicts, Wurzbacher was entrusted with rebuilding it together with Gauleiter Julius Streicher.

Wurzbacher was an SA leader from 1928 and was confirmed as commander of SA-Standarte 1 "Franken" in Nuremberg on 1 January 1929. He was promoted to SA-Standartenführer on 8 May 1931. From that date to 13 April 1932, Wurzbacher commanded SA-Standarte 14, resuming command on 1 July 1932, after a temporary ban on the SA was lifted. From 1929, Wurzbacher also served as district head of the Nuremberg-South Welfare Office.

In the parliamentary election of 5 March 1933, Wurzbacher was elected as a deputy of the Reichstag for electoral constituency 26, Franconia, and he retained this seat until the collapse of the regime May 1945. In April 1933, Wurzbacher was involved in organizing and implementing the Nazi boycott of Jewish businesses in Nuremberg. During the Nuremberg Party Rally of 1933, he was promoted to SA-Oberführer. From 24 August 1934, to 1945, he was the leader of SA-Brigade 78 "Mittelfranconia" and was promoted to SA-Brigadeführer on 1 May 1937.

== Second World War ==
During the Second World War, Wurzbacher served with the Wehrmacht from the beginning of the war in September 1939 until Germany's surrender in May 1945. He served in the 213th, 186th and 334th infantry regiments, on the western, eastern and Italian fronts. At the end of the war, he held the rank of Hauptmann.

== Postwar life ==
After being held as a prisoner of war by the Americans and interned in labour camps, Wurzbacher was released in mid-1953. He died in 1984 in Altdorf bei Nürnberg.

== Sources ==
- Joachim Lilla, Martin Döring, Andreas Schulz (2004). Statisten in Uniform: Die Mitglieder des Reichstags 1933–1945. Ein biographisches Handbuch. Unter Einbeziehung der völkischen und nationalsozialistischen Reichstagsabgeordneten ab Mai 1924 (in German). Düsseldorf: Droste. p. 743. ISBN 3-7700-5254-4.
- E. Kienast (Hg.): Der Großdeutsche Reichstag 1938, IV. Wahlperiode, R. v. Decker's Verlag, G. Schenck, Berlin 1938.
- Stockhorst, Erich (1985). 5000 Köpfe: Wer War Was im 3. Reich. Arndt. ISBN 978-3-887-41116-9.
