= Otto Winkelmann =

German policeman, SS-Obergruppenführer and Higher SS and Police Leader

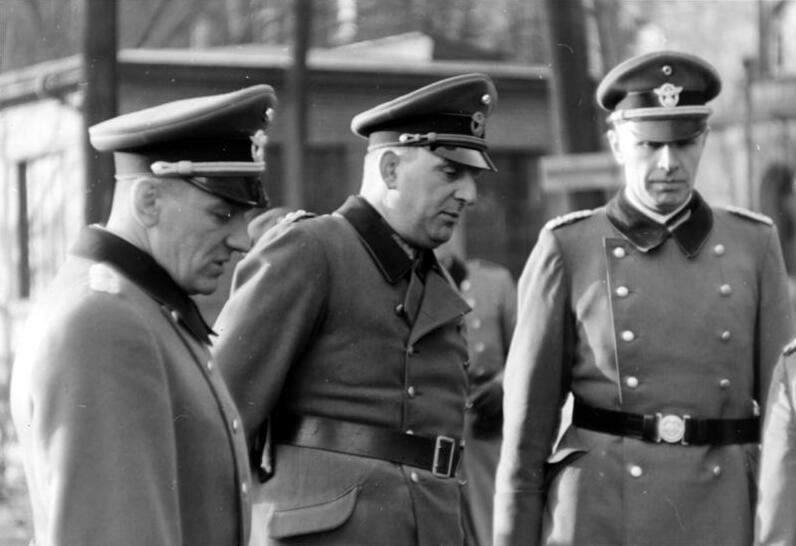
- Winkelmann (right) with Wilhelm Fuchs (left) and Kurt Daluege (center) (1940)
- Born: 4 September 1894; Bordesholm, Kingdom of Prussia, German Empire
- Died: 24 September 1977 (age 83); Horn-Bad Meinberg, West Germany
- Military career
- Allegiance: German Empire; Weimar Republic; Nazi Germany
- Branch: Imperial German Army; Reichswehr; Schutzstaffel
- Service years: 1914-18; 1938-1945
- Rank: SS-Obergruppenführer und General der Waffen-SS und Polizei
- Commands: Higher SS and Police Leader, Hungary; Commandant, "Fortress Budapest"
- Conflicts: World War I World War II
- Awards: Iron Cross, 1st and 2nd class Knight's Cross of the War Merit Cross

Otto Winkelmann (4 September 1894 – 24 September 1977) was a German police official, SS-Obergruppenführer and General of the Waffen-SS who served as the Higher SS and Police Leader (HSSPF) in Hungary during the deportation and extermination of Hungarian Jews.

== Early life ==
Otto Winkelmann was born in Bordesholm the son of the city administrative director. After volksschule in Bordelsholm and secondary school in Kiel, he entered the University of Kiel to study law in 1914. However, he dropped out of school to enlist in the Imperial German Army on the outbreak of the First World War in August 1914. He served on the western front with Reserve Infantry Regiment 64. He applied for a commission and became a Leutnant in August 1915. Transferring to Infantry Regiment 58, he served with that unit until the armistice, being wounded several times and earning the Iron Cross, first and 2nd class. He remained in the army and became a member of the Freikorps. He fought in the Ruhr and in Silesia until November 1919. He was discharged from the army on 31 January 1920 with the rank of Oberleutnant after joining the Prussian uniformed police as a police lieutenant.

== Career with the police and SS ==
Winkelmann was assigned to police duty in Düsseldorf where he became involved in anti-French activities during the occupation of the Ruhr. In May 1923, he was promoted to police captain, but in December 1923, he was sentenced to a one-year jail term and fined 500 Reichsmarks by a French military court for his involvement in separatist actions. However, in March 1924 he was released and transferred to police duty in Altona, where he remained for two years before transferring back to Düsseldorf in June 1926. In February 1930 he became Director of Police in Görlitz, Saxony. There he joined the Nazi Party on 1 November 1932.

Winkelmann's next important career move came in November 1937 when he was posted to the Hauptamt (Main Office) of the Ordnungspolizei (Orpo) located in Berlin. On 1 July 1938, he joined the SS (SS No. 308,238) in the rank of SS-Sturmbannführer. Over the next few years, he advanced steadily in rank, being promoted to SS-Gruppenführer and Generalleutnant of Police in November 1942. From August 1942, he headed the Command Office in Orpo, and functioned as deputy to Orpo Chief Kurt Daluege. He continued in this position until 19 March 1944 when, as a recently promoted SS-Obergruppenführer and General of Police, he was named to the newly created position of Higher SS and Police Leader for Hungary.

During Winkelmann's tenure in Hungary, in an operation directed by Adolf Eichmann, over 437,000 Hungarian Jews were deported between May and July 1944, most all of whom perished in the Nazi extermination camp at Auschwitz. After the Hungarian government of Miklós Horthy began negotiations to sue for peace, Winkelmann, along with Edmund Veesenmayer the German Plenipotentiary to Hungary, immediately acted to remove the Horthy regime and install the Arrow Cross puppet government on 15 October 1944. On December 1, 1944, Winkelmann was made a General of the Waffen-SS. Adolf Hitler declared Budapest to be a fortress city and appointed Winkelmann as city commandant. The siege of Budapest lasted until the city's fall to the Red Army on 13 February 1945, and Winkelmann retreated into Austria where he took up the position of commander of all police on 1 March. For his services in Budapest, Winkelmann was awarded the Knight's Cross of the War Merit Cross.

== Post-war life ==
On 1 May 1945, Winkelmann was captured by American forces and interned at Camp King. He was temporarily transferred to Hungary on 27 October 1945 to testify at war crimes trials of members of the Arrow Cross government. The Hungarian government applied for the extradition of Winkelmann, intending to try him also as a war criminal in Hungary. However, after lengthy negotiations, the American authorities denied the request. On 1 September 1948, Winkelmann was allowed to return to Germany, where he was released.

Winkelmann took up residence in his hometown of Bordesholm, later moving to Großharrie and then to Kiel. In April 1955 he was elected to the municipal council of Kiel. In May 1961 he provided a written deposition in Germany to provide evidence in the Eichmann trial being held in Israel. In this document, he denied all culpability for the deportation and murder of Hungarian Jews, testifying that Eichmann did not receive orders from him, but directly from the Reich Security Main Office (RSHA) in the matter of the Final Solution. Winkelmann subsequently served as President of the Association of Retired Police Officers. He retired in 1964 and was awarded the pension of a General of Police. This generated controversy, as did the fact that he never stood trial for any role he may have played in the Hungarian Holocaust.

== Sources ==
- Höhne, Heinz (1971). The Order of the Death's Head: The Story of Hitler's SS. Ballantine Books. ISBN 0-345-28333-3.
- Klee, Ernst (2007). Das Personenlexikon zum Dritten Reich. Wer war was vor und nach 1945. Frankfurt-am-Main: Fischer-Taschenbuch-Verlag. ISBN 978-3-596-16048-8.
- Williams, Max (2018). SS Elite: The Senior Leaders of Hitler's Praetorian Guard. Vol. 3. Fonthill Media LLC. ISBN 978-1-781-55638-2.
- Williamson, Gordon (1994). The SS:Hitler's Instrument of Terror. Amber Books. ISBN 978-1-907-44656-6.
- Yerger, Mark C. (1997). Allgemeine-SS: The Commands, Units and Leaders of the General SS. Schiffer Publishing Ltd. ISBN 0-7643-0145-4.
