= Gerhard Roßbach =

German nationalist politician (1893–1967)

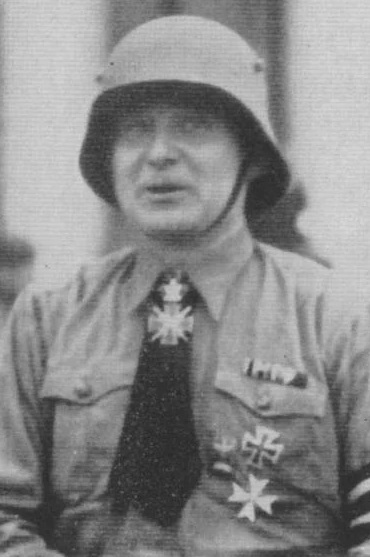
- Roßbach in 1934
- Born: 28 February 1893; Kehrberg, Kreis Greifenhagen, German Empire
- Died: 30 August 1967 (aged 74); Hamburg, West Germany
- Military career
- Allegiance: German Empire; Weimar Republic; Nazi Germany (1933–1934)
- Branch: Imperial German Army; Reichsheer; Freikorps
- Commands: World War I Silesian Uprisings; Russian Civil War; Kapp Putsch; Ruhr Uprising; Beer Hall putsch

Gerhard Roßbach (28 February 1893 – 30 August 1967), also spelled Rossbach, was a German Freikorps leader and nationalist political activist during the interwar period. Born in Kehrberg, Pomerania, he gained prominence for his involvement in various right-wing paramilitary groups following World War I and in particular for his close association with Ernst Röhm, who served as an important intermediary in the early 1920s between those right-wing paramilitary organizations and upper echelons of the Reichswehr. Rossbach is generally credited with inventing the brown uniforms of the Nazi Party after supplying surplus tropical khaki shirts to early troops of the Sturmabteilung (SA).

Waite, who produced the early historical standard study of the Freikorps movement, writes (ironically) of Roßbach that, "The true Landsknechte ['Freebooter'] type which the National Socialists were later to extol as the possessor of 'the moral strength of the race,' is personified in Gerhard Roßbach the notorious Free Corps leader who became the first adjutant of Hitler's S.A."

In his biography of Adolf Hitler, Heiden transcribed Roßbach's recollection of his early days as a Freikorps commander:

"It was the beautiful old Freebooter class of war and post-war times .. organizing masses and losing them just as quickly, tossed this way and that way just for the sake of our daily bread; gathering men about us and playing soldiers with them; brawling and drinking, roaring and smashing windows — destroying and shattering what needs to be destroyed. Ruthless and inexorably hard. The abscess on the sick body of the nation must be cut open and squeezed until the clear red blood flows. And it must be left to flow for a good long time till the body is purified."

== Life and career ==
=== World War I ===
Having enlisted in the infantry prior to the outbreak of the First World War, Roßbach fought on the Eastern Front as a member of the 175th (8th Prussian) Infantry under XVII Corps in the 8th, 9th, and finally under the 7th army of the Imperial German force. This unit moved around quite a bit, which is symptomatic—in the record-keeping system characteristic of Imperial German command—of very heavy casualties being intentionally concealed to maintain morale or otherwise getting lost in their documentation as the war unfolded. In addition to the many battles in which they participated, Roßbach's army group bore responsibility for the defense of Silesia and the Danzig area for significant periods of the war.

Like many officers who fought for most of the war in the East, Roßbach was finally called to the Western Front, where he was seriously wounded in either the Battle of Lys, part of Ypres, or in the second battle of the Marne). He was thereafter promoted to First Lieutenant.

=== Roßbach's Freikorps campaigns ===
Roßbach's Freikorps activities, particularly in the Silesian Uprisings, had a marked continuity with his service as infantry officer during the First World War, with the important difference that all of these activities were illegal under the terms of the Treaty of Versailles and the law of the Weimar Republic. During the Baltic fighting of 1919, his Freikorps Roßbach made an extremely long march from Berlin across Eastern Europe to rescue the Eiserne Division (another Freikorps) from destruction by the Latvian Army.

Waite writes that, "Whatever one thinks of the man's character, [Roßbach's]...rescue of the Iron Division must remain one of the great feats of military history. Braving an early and unusually harsh Baltic winter, Rossbach led his badly equipped men over a twelve thousand mile trek from Berlin across Eastern Europe. They often marched forty miles a day. As soon as they arrived at Thorensberg, the Rossbach Detachment attacked the Latvian army, cut a path through to the beleagured Iron Division, and held off the Latvians until Bischoff's men could escape."

Nazi Rudolf Höss, a member of the Roßbach's Freikorp involved in this campaign, recalled that mission in his autobiography written while on trial at Nuremberg:

The fighting in the Baltic States was more savage and more bitter than any I had experienced [in the first] World War... There was no real front, for the enemy was everywhere. When it came to a clash, it was a fight to the death, and no quarter was given or expected... [Houses were] set on fire and burned the occupants to death. On innumerable occasions I came across this terrible spectacle of burned-out cottages containing the charred corpses of women and children...Although later on I had to be the continual witness of far more terrible scenes, yet the picture of those half-burned-out huts at the edge of the forest beside the Dvina, with whole families dead within them, remains indelibly engraved on my mind.

Roßbach's Freikorps went on to participate in the Kapp Putsch in 1920, at which point the group was banned. They regrouped under numerous changing front organizations, each of which was banned in turn. Most notable amongst these fronts was the Sports and Gymnastics section of the Nazi party, where Roßbach memorably introduced his early version of the Brownshirt into the group's uniforms. In 1921, they participated in paramilitary action in the Third Silesian Uprising. In the early 1920s, Roßbach was arrested for trying to overthrow the government.

Money came from the Landbund, heavy industry, and arms dealing. In the early 1920s, Roßbach was arrested for trying to overthrow the government. Alumni from the Roßbach Freikorp included Martin Bormann (later Hitler's personal secretary), Rudolf Höss (later commandant at Auschwitz), and Ernst Krull (who was known for his involvement in the murder of Rosa Luxemburg and was questioned in the matter of Matthias Ernsberger's assassination). Kurt Daluege, a major figure in the Orpo and domestic security elements within the Nazi movement and under the Third Reich, was also a member of the group—and many others besides.

Reputation of the Roßbach Freikorps as Early Nazi "Old Fighters" As technically illegal (but practically or juridically tolerated), the history of the Freikorps is often obscure and ambiguous. The most radical formations within these associations represent, so to speak, the shadow army of a shadow government that came into the public domain only when Hitler came to power in 1933. As non-state actors operating outside of legal sanction the precise nature of the Freikorps' activities were not supposed to be recorded, documented or properly defined in a manner that would open them to international scrutiny by the powers of the Triple Entente. Nevertheless many scholarly works have been written about them, and a great deal of firsthand testimony about the activities of Roßbach Freikorps came out after the Second World War—-most notably the autobiography of Rudolf Höss and Gerard Roßbach's own memoir.

Of the many Freikorps that emerge after the war, the groups led by Roßbach, Maercker, Pabst, Epp, and Erhardt are particularly notorious and receive frequent mention in the literature as early pre-Beerhall Putsch elements of the early Nazi party or 'the old fighters.' As Waite writes, "not all Free Corps entered the Nazi movement as directly as did Roßbach's..." The Iron Division, for example—extremely active during the immediate aftermath of Germany's defeat in the first World War—was more of an establishment outfit. Its most notable member, Heinz Guderian, did not join the Nazi party until after Hitler was appointed Chancellor in 1933. Members of the Iron Division who ended up in the early Nazi party did so after the Iron Division disbanded, and they likely found themselves funneled through other Freikorps associations such as those mentioned above. Members of Roßbach's group, on the other hand, became Nazis almost as a matter of course.

As crackdowns on the activities of Freikorps followed prominent assassinations—especially the assassination of Walter Rathenau by members of Ehrhardt's Freikorps—members of these groups transferred allegiance and wound up bundled together as members of Hitler's SA between the summer of 1921 and the putsch in November 1923. Whereas Epp's group was particularly associated with atrocities in Munich or Bavaria generally and members of Erhardt's group were notorious for extrajudicial killings (especially high-profile political assassinations and killings in the Ruhr), Roßbach's paramilitary group is especially associated with atrocities during the Silesian Uprisings.

In fact, all of these zones of criminality are actually overlapping domains: members of each group participated in atrocities related to putting down uprisings within the German revolution, members of all groups participated in political assassinations. It is likely that members of all groups participated on some level in the Silesian Uprisings, but Roßbach's Freikorps is especially associated with the Silesian Uprisings due to their geographical proximity to Silesia. All three groups may be accurately represented as feeders for recruitment or absorption into the early Nazi movement during the early period between the 1921 and the Beerhall Putsch.

=== Roßbach's Early Contributions to Nazism ===
In 1921 Roßbach, together with others from the Roßbach circle, took part in a bike ride to East Prussia. In order to be uniformly equipped for this trip the remaining stock of the East African Lettow shirts, last used by the officers of the Schutztruppe, were bought and then distributed to the cyclists. These shirts were beige-brown, much lighter than the later Hitler shirts and with white mother-of-pearl buttons. Later these shirts were introduced as a community clothing in his society and in 1924 also for the Salzburg Schill Youth. They were then taken over for the German Schilljugend by Edmund Heines and were distributed, through the "Schill Sportversand", to the SA. (The SA was initially known as the 'Sports Section' of the Nazi movement—a convenient alias to disguise their real function within Hitler's party.)

Roßbach helped start the Schilljugend, a youth organization, to get rid of "intellectual elements" in the youth movements and instill children with "nationalistic, socialistic, authoritative, and militaristic" ideas. He took a special interest in developing its membership. Roßbach organised music festivals which combined folk and classical music to instil national pride and construct radical-nationalist community values.

Roßbach also joined the Nazi Party for a time, and was Hitler's representative in Berlin, setting up front organizations when the Nazis were banned in Prussia. He took part in the Beer Hall putsch of 1923, mobilising students, cadets and officer candidates of the Reichswehr. After the failed putsch, he fled to Vienna using a false passport. There he was arrested in February 1924, but allowed to remain in Austria. He was recruited by Adolf Hitler to help organize the Sturmabteilung (SA). By 1928, he could claim to have killed "a number of Mecklenburg laborers and Spartacist sympathizers". He later fell out with Hitler during the latter's rise to power and was arrested, but not killed during the Night of the Long Knives in 1934.

=== Roßbach's Memoirs & Postwar Activity ===
According to his own memoirs, following the discovery of homoerotic photographs in his living quarters on 30 June 1934, he was forced to adopt a new identity and worked for the Iduna Germania insurance company until the end of World War II.

Historian Robert G. L. Waite described Roßbach as a "sadistic murderer of the so-called Fehmgericht and the notorious homosexual who, according to his own testimony, perverted Ernst Röhm".

After World War II Roßbach operated an import-export company near Frankfurt and wrote his memoirs in 1950. In his last years he played a prominent role in organising the Bayreuth Festivals of Richard Wagner's music.

=== Marriage and Family ===
Roßbach was married to Hildegard Damcke (born 6 October 1898 in Berlin-Charlottenburg; died 30 April 1937) from 12 December 1921. The marriage produced a daughter, Ingeborg, and a son, Eckart. On 3 March 1939, he married the actress Brigitte von Bülow (born 25 May 1914). This marriage ended in divorce in 1948.
