= Hugo von Abercron =

German balloonist and non-fiction writer

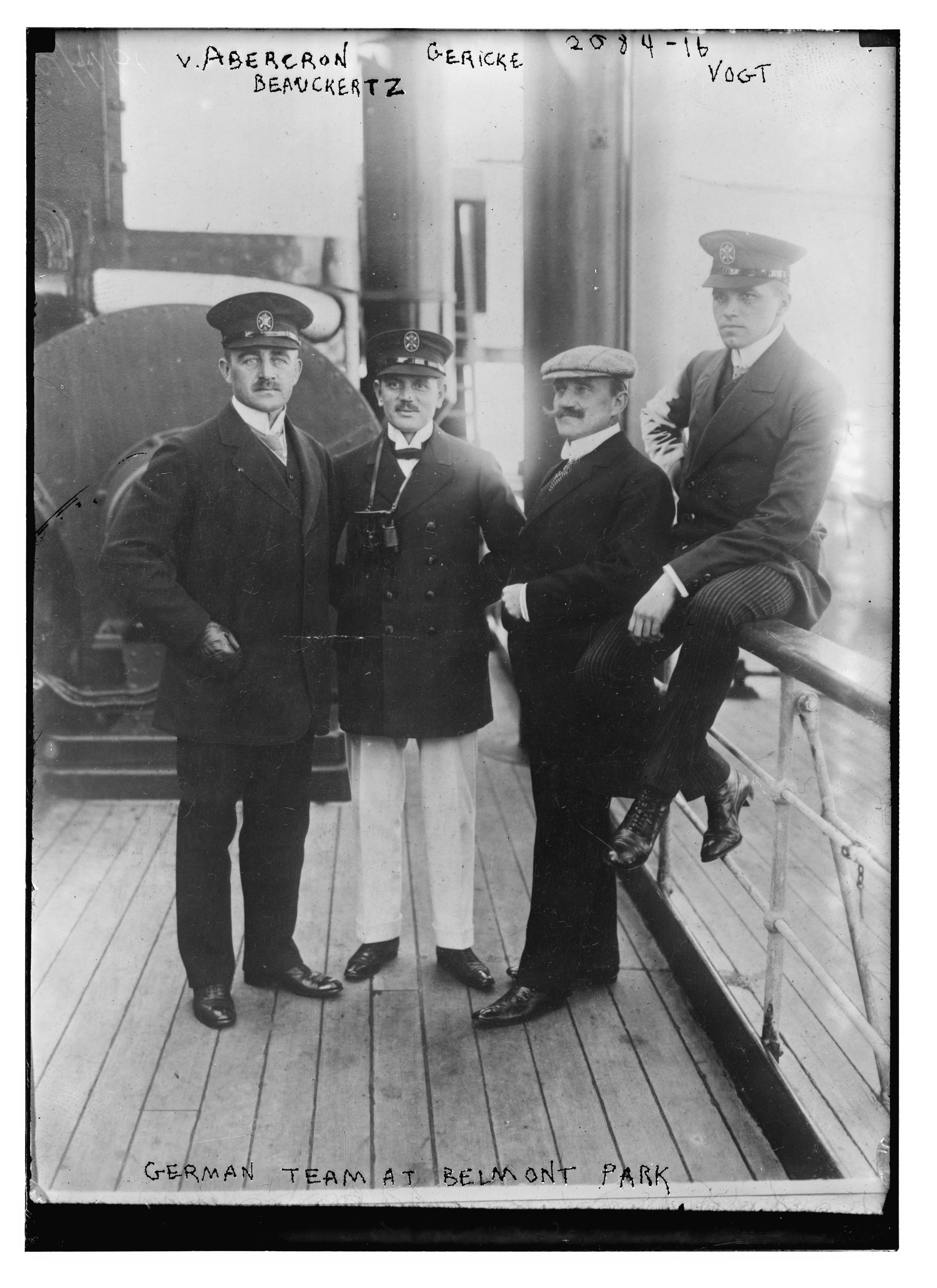
German Team at Belmont Park V. Abercron, Gericke, Beauclertz, Vogt

Hugo Wilhelm Freiherr von Abercron (24 October 1869 – 16 April 1945) was a German officer, major general, balloonist and non-fiction author. He was one of the most important German balloonists in the inter-war years.

== Life ==
Abercron was born in Bosatz, Silesia near Ratibor (modern Raciborz), the son of the Prussian officer Christian Abercron and his wife, Maria Theresa, née Hinsch.

After he graduated from high school, on 22 March 1888, he entered the Prussian army as a Leutnant. On 12 September 1895, he was promoted to Oberleutnant. In 1903 and 1910 he served as a captain and company commander in Düsseldorf.

From 1906 to 1927 he was the chairman of the free balloon department in the Deutschen Luftfahrtverbandes (DLV) (later Deutscher Luftfahrtverein). He took part in the Gordon Bennett Cup several times, reaching third place at St. Louis in 1910.

At the outbreak of World War I, Abercron was appointed commander of the newly founded Reserve-Infanterie-Regiment, which he commanded at the Western Front as well as in the Battle of Verdun.

After the war he worked for the reconstruction of German aviation. In 1932 he became the manager of Institut für volkstümliche Naturkunde URANIA, in Berlin.

He wrote an autobiography called Hugo von Abercron. Offizier und Luftpionier.

== Awards ==
- Order of the Red Eagle
- Order of Saint John (Bailiwick of Brandenburg)
- Prussian Service Cross
- Order of Henry the Lion
- House and Merit Order of Peter Frederick Louis
- Order of the White Falcon
- Saxe-Ernestine House Order
- Friedrich Order
