= Richard Hildebrandt =

German Nazi politician, SS-Obergruppenführer (1897–1951)

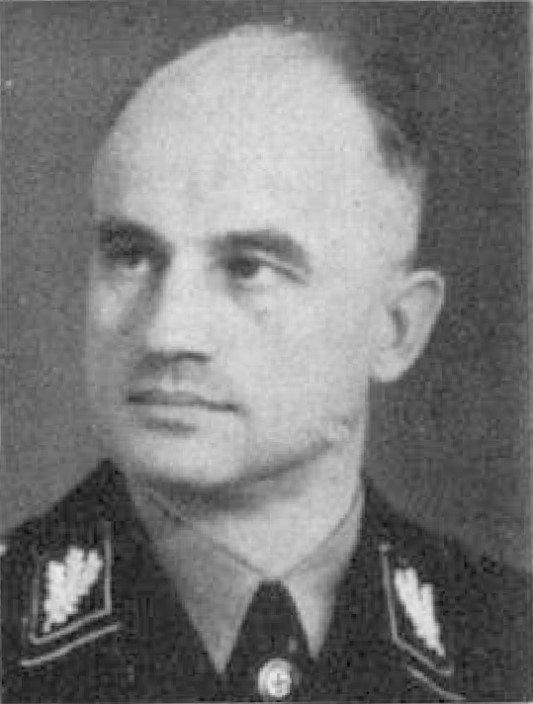
- Hildebrandt, c. 1938
- Born: 13 March 1897; Worms, Grand Duchy of Hesse, German Empire
- Died: 10 March 1951 (aged 53); Bydgoszcz, Polish People's Republic
- Political party: Nazi Party
- Status: Executed by hanging
- Motive: Nazism
- Convictions: U.S. Military; Crimes against humanity War crimes Membership in a criminal organization Poland; Crimes against humanity
- Trial: RuSHA trial
- Penalty: U.S. Military; 25 years imprisonment Poland; Death
- Military career
- Allegiance: German Empire; Nazi Germany
- Branch: Imperial German Army; Schutzstaffel; Allgemeine-SS; Waffen-SS
- Rank: Leutnant; SS-Obergruppenführer und General der Waffen-SS
- Commands: Higher SS and Police Leader, "Rhein;" "Weichsel;" "Schwarzes Meer;" "Südost;" "Böhmen-Mähren"; Chief, SS Race and Settlement Main Office
- Conflicts: World War I; World War II
- Awards: Iron Cross, 1st and 2nd class; Clasp to the Iron Cross, 2nd class; War Merit Cross, 1st and 2nd class with Swords

Richard Hermann Hildebrandt (13 March 1897 – 10 March 1951) was a German Nazi politician and SS-Obergruppenführer. During the Second World War, he served as a Higher SS and Police Leader (HSSPF) in Nazi-occupied Poland, the Soviet Union and the Protectorate of Bohemia and Moravia. He was the last head of the SS Race and Settlement Main Office in SS headquarters, charged with enforcing Germanization policies. After the war, Hildebrandt was convicted of war crimes and crimes against humanity by an American military court and sentenced to 25 years in prison. He was subsequently extradited to Poland to stand trial for separate charges, sentenced to death, and executed. Hildebrandt was the younger brother of Ernst-Albrecht Hildebrandt who was an SS-Oberführer and SS and Police Leader (SSPF) in northern Italy.

== Early life ==
Hildebrandt was born in Worms, the fourth of six sons of a ceramic factory director who had also served as the city's Burgermeister. He attended the local Volksschule and then gymnasiums in Frankfurt and in Dorsten from which he graduated in May 1915. He passed his Abitur and immediately volunteered for military service as a Kriegsfreiwilliger in the Imperial German Army during the First World War. He was assigned to the 22nd (2nd Westphalian) Field Artillery Regiment, then from November 1915 saw action as an artilleryman with the 18th (Thuringian) Foot Artillery Regiment on both the eastern front and the western front. In February 1918, he was commissioned a Leutnant and served as an artillery battery commander. He was discharged from the service at the end of the war in November 1918, having been awarded the Iron Cross, 2nd class.

== Peacetime SS and political career ==
Returning to civilian life, Hildebrandt worked briefly as an apprentice in his father's factory, then attended the University of Cologne and the Ludwig-Maximilians-Universität München but dropped out in 1921 before graduating. There followed stints at working as a correspondence clerk and at various banking positions, interspersed with periods of unemployment. He joined the Nazi Party in August 1922 in Windsheim. In May 1923, he joined the Freikorps Oberland militia and, in June, the Sturmabteilung (SA), the Party's paramilitary unit. He marched his SA unit through Nuremberg in support of the failed Beer Hall Putsch then taking place in Munich in November 1923. Following the ban on the Party and the SA, Hildebrandt eventually emigrated to the United States in March 1928. He rejoined the legalized Nazi Party on 1 June 1928 (membership number 89,221), becoming a member of the Ortsgruppe (Local Group) in New York. As an early Party member, he would later be awarded the Golden Party Badge. He continued to switch between jobs, as a farm laborer, gardener, and as a clerk in the construction business and for a book export company. Finally, in May 1930, he returned to Germany.

Settling again in Windsheim, Hildebrandt became the Party's Ortsgruppenleiter (Local Group Leader) there, soon advancing to Bezirksleiter (District Leader). He rejoined the SA in January 1931 but by February he transferred to the Schutzstaffel (SS) with SS number 7,088 and moved to Munich, the center of Party operations. On 24 June 1931, he was commissioned an SS-Sturmführer and assigned to the headquarters staff of the prestigious First SS-Abschnitt in Munich. By 14 August, he was made the unit's Chief of Staff and adjutant to the commanding officer, SS-Gruppenführer Sepp Dietrich. He was given an office in the Brown House that he shared with the head of the Party's intelligence agency, Reinhard Heydrich. Hildebrandt remained in this post until 1 October 1932 when he succeeded Dietrich as the commanding officer of SS-Gruppe Süd in Munich, where he served until 30 January 1933. He was then transferred to SS-Gruppe West in Düsseldorf, where he deputized for the commanding officer, SS-Gruppenführer Fritz Weitzel.

On 9 November 1933, Hildebrandt became the first commander of SS-Abschnitt (District) XXI, headquartered in Görlitz, where he oversaw three SS-Standarten. This was followed by a transfer to head SS-Abschnitt XI in Wiesbaden on 15 April 1935, where he remained through 31 December 1936. His next assignment was a promotion to commander of SS-Oberabschnitt (Main District) "Rhein," also in Weisbaden, from January 1937. Additionally, when the post of SS and Police Leader (HSSPF) "Rhein" was created on 1 April 1939, Hildebrandt became the first holder of this post, holding it simultaneously with the SS-Oberabschnitt command. He retained these posts until September 1939, after the outbreak of the war.

Apart from his various high-level SS commands, Hildebrandt was also active in politics. Following the Nazi seizure of power, he was elected as a deputy to the Reichstag on 12 November 1933 from electoral constituency 7, Breslau. He was subsequently elected as a deputy from constituency 19, Hessen-Nassau, on 29 March 1936 and retained this seat until the fall of the Nazi regime. In 1934, he was also appointed to the Prussian Provincial Council. From April 1940 to July 1942 he also served as an honorary member of the People's Court.

== Second World War ==
On 21 September 1939, Hildebrandt was named the first HSSPF "Weichsel," which was made up of Danzig and those areas annexed from Poland that were formed into the Reichsgau Danzig-West Prussia. In this post, he commanded all SS personnel and police in his jurisdiction, including the Ordnungspolizei (Orpo; regular uniformed police), the SD (intelligence service) and the SiPo (security police), which included the Gestapo (secret police). On 9 November, he was also made the first commander of the newly established SS-Oberabschnitt "Weichsel," which he held in personal union with the HSSPF command.

Almost immediately upon taking command, Hildebrandt began enforcing the Nazi racial policies including persecution of Jews and ethnic Poles. In October 1939, he ordered the murder of 1,400 mentally disabled people from Pomerelia, including inmates from the Świecie psychiatric hospital and another nearly 2,000 mentally disabled people from the asylum in Konradstein (today, Kocborowo in Starogard Gdański). Hildebrandt's area of jurisdiction was also the site of the Intelligenzaktion Pommern actions, in which members of the Polish intelligentsia were systematically murdered. These included the massacres at Piaśnica and the Valley of Death in Bydgoszcz. In May and June 1940, Hildebrandt also served briefly in the Waffen-SS as a battery commander in an SS artillery regiment.

Hildebrandt was also the deputy for the "Weichsel" area to Reichsführer-SS Heinrich Himmler in his capacity as Reich Commissioner for the Consolidation of German Nationhood (RKFDV). In this post, Hildebrandt was responsible for the "Germanization" component of the Generalplan Ost in the Danzig–West Prussia area. Then, on 20 April 1943, Hildebrandt left his HSSPF post to head the SS Race and Settlement Main Office (SS-Rasse und Siedlungshauptamt; RuSHA) at SS headquarters in Berlin, and would hold this position until the end of the war. This office originally was charged with safeguarding the "racial purity" of the SS. It now also worked in partnership with the Volksdeutsche Mittelstelle (VoMi) in the "Germanization" of captured eastern territories by transplanting ethnic Germans into areas designated for settlement by the SS. This involved the resettlement of Germans in the Nazi-occupied territories after the forced displacement and deportation of the native families from those lands. Hildebrandt also was responsible for conducting official race tests on the population of the occupied territories for racial selection.

In addition to his staff position, Hildebrandt returned to an active SS and police command when he replaced SS-Oberführer Heinz Roch as the SSPF in "Taurien-Krim-Simferopol" on 25 December 1943. At the same time he replaced the ailing SS-Gruppenführer Ludolf-Hermann von Alvensleben as Acting HSSPF "Schwarzes Meer" (Black Sea) based in Nikolajew (today, Mykolaiv) and became permanent HSSPF in February 1944. He technically retained these posts until 5 September 1944, months after the Red Army overran the area. He then returned full time to his RuSHA post until 23 February 1945, when he was named the HSSPF "Südost" and commander of SS-Oberabschnitt "Südost" in Silesia, with headquarters in Breslau (today, Wrocław). From this time, he also functioned as Himmler's Chief Liaison Officer to the Commander-in-Chief of Army Group Center, Generalfeldmarschall Ferdinand Schörner. In April 1945, he received his last posting, succeeding SS-Obergruppenführer Karl Hermann Frank as HSSPF "Böhmen-Mähren" in the Protectorate of Bohemia and Moravia.

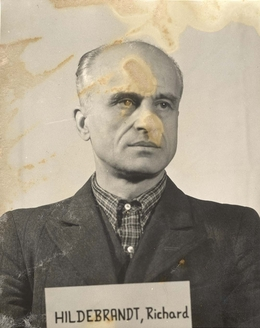
Hildebrandt in U.S. custody c. 1945–1948

== Postwar criminal proceedings and execution ==
After the end of the war in Europe, Hildebrandt lived in Wiesbaden under an assumed name until he was discovered and arrested by the Americans on 24 December 1945 and interned in Regensburg. He was brought to trial in the eighth subsequent war crimes trial held by the U.S. Military Tribunal in Nuremberg, the so-called RuSHA trial, held between 20 October 1947 and 10 March 1948.

At the trial's conclusion, he was found guilty and sentenced to 25 years in prison for the following crimes against humanity:

- kidnapping of alien children;
- forced abortions on Eastern workers;
- taking away infants of Eastern workers;
- illegal and unjust punishment of foreign nationals for sexual intercourse with Germans;
- hampering the reproduction of enemy nationals;
- forced evacuation and resettlement of populations;
- forced Germanization of enemy nationals; and
- utilization of enemy nationals as slave labour.

On a separate charge of carrying out a program of euthanasia, the tribunal determined that Hildebrandt carried it out under state legislation against only citizens of the state of Germany and, for that reason, it did not constitute a crime against humanity. Because of his membership in the SS, he was also found guilty of membership in a criminal organization.

Hildebrandt was then extradited to Poland for further criminal court proceedings. He stood trial from 8 October to 4 November 1949 for crimes committed during his tenure as HSSPF in Weichsal, together with SS-Brigadeführer Max Henze who had been the Chief of Police in Bydgoszcz and Danzig. At the conclusion of the trial, Hildebrandt and Henze both were sentenced to death by the Bydgoszcz court, and the sentences were upheld by the Polish Supreme Court in Warsaw on 25 November 1950. In his plea for mercy, Hildebrandt admitted no guilt and stated: "I can swear on my honor that my conscience is clear." Polish President Bolesław Bierut denied the clemency request and confirmed the sentences on 3 December. Hildebrandt and Henze were both hanged in the Bydgoszcz prison on 10 March 1951.

== SS and police ranks ==
SS and police ranks
date	rank
24 June 1931	SS-Sturmführer
14 August 1931	SS-Sturmbannführer
18 October 1931	SS-Standartenführer
1 January 1932	SS-Oberführer
9 November 1933	SS-Brigadeführer
13 September 1936	SS-Gruppenführer
10 April 1941	Generalleutnant der polizei
30 January 1942	SS-Obergruppenführer und General der polizei
1 December 1944	General der Waffen-SS
