= Günther Pancke =

German Nazi, Higher SS and Police Leader of Denmark (1899–1973)

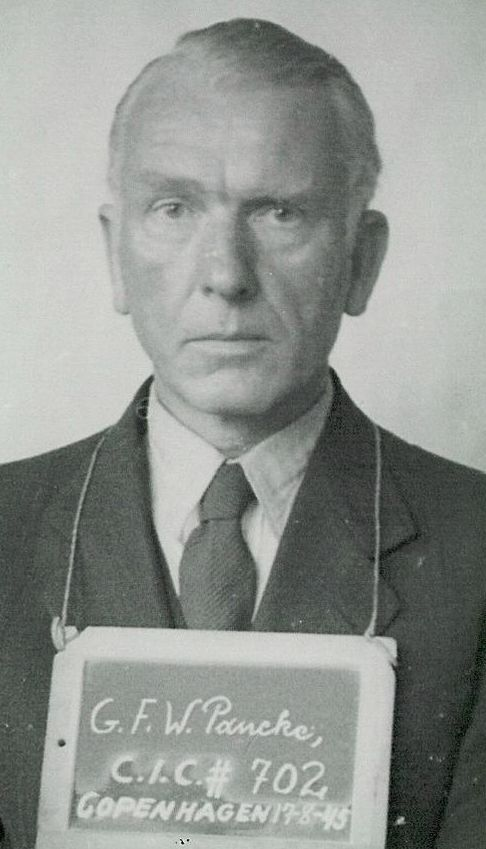
Günther Pancke, 1945

Günther Friedrich Wilhelm Ludwig Pancke (1 May 1899 – 17 August 1973) was a German SS-Obergruppenführer and SS functionary during the Nazi era who served as Higher SS and Police Leader of Denmark.

== History ==
Pancke was born in Gnesen (Gniezno), Province of Posen, German Empire (today part of Poland). He served during the First World War as frontline officer with the rank of Leutnant. Between 1920 and 1927 he stayed in South America. He joined the Nazi Party on 1 August 1930, and the SS on 1 June 1931.

Pancke was appointed as Verbindungsoffizier between the Führerhauptquartier and the SS-Totenkopfverbänden and Einsatzgruppen des SD in 1939. After that he served as Höherer SS- und Polizeiführer "Mitte". From October 1943 until the end of the war he was appointed as the SS- und Polizeiführer "Dänemark" and was promoted to Obergruppenführer und General der Polizei on 20 April 1944, and General der Waffen-SS on 21 March 1945.

During his role in Denmark, he became incensed by the refusal of the Danish police to combat resistance forces or to protect factories from sabotage. He ordered the entire national police force, amounting to approximately 10,000 officers, to be arrested and sent to the Buchenwald concentration camp. Approximately 1,700 were arrested, with the balance eluding capture.

In 1948, Pancke was found guilty of war crimes by a Danish court and sentenced to 20 years in prison. However, he was released early in 1953. Pancke died on 17 August 1973 in Hamburg.

== Sources and external links ==
- Interrogation of Pancke, Günther, in pdf format in Nuremberg.pdf
