= Freikorps =

Reactionary German paramilitants

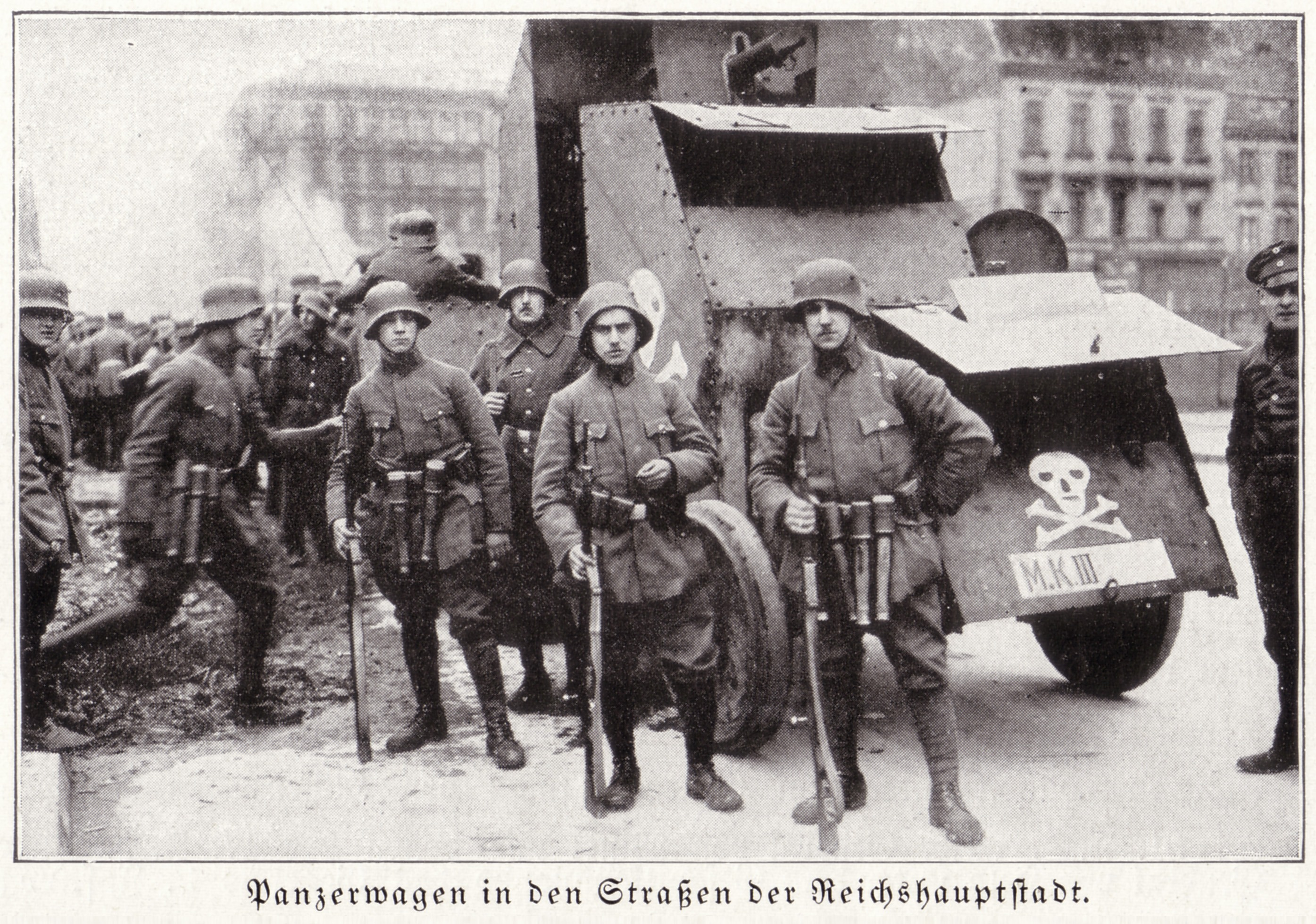
Freikorps paramilitaries in Berlin, 1919

Freikorps were German paramilitary militias formed in the aftermath of World War I and during the German Revolution of 1918–19. Freikorps units consisted primarily of demobilised soldiers, young men, and conservative nationalists blaming socialists and communists for Germany's problems.

They were ostensibly mustered to fight on behalf of the Weimar government against the German communists during the Spartacist uprising. However, many Freikorps also largely despised the Republic and were involved in assassinations of its supporters, later aiding the Nazis in their rise to power.

Following the Kapp Putsch in 1920, most Freikorps units were forcibly dissolved by the government, with many former Freikorps militants often ending up in other conservative or nationalist paramilitary units such as the Black Reichswehr or the Nazi Sturmabteilung.

== Interwar ==
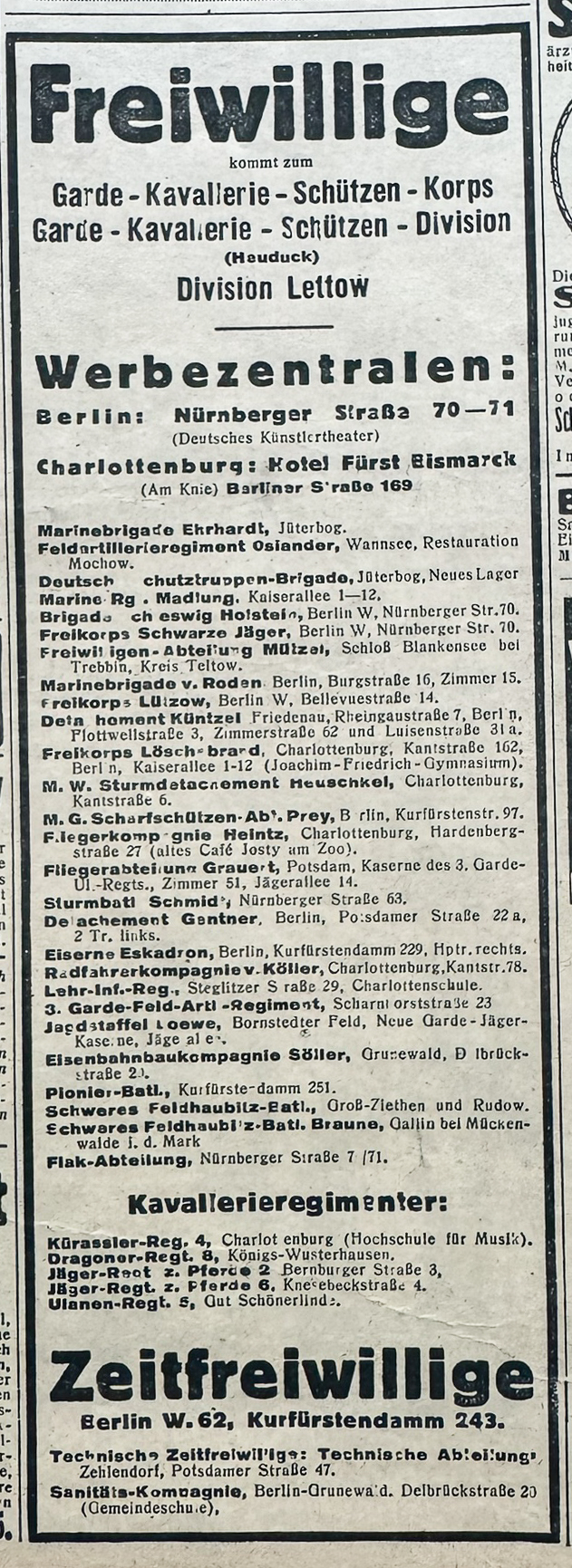
1919 ad for Freikorps volunteers

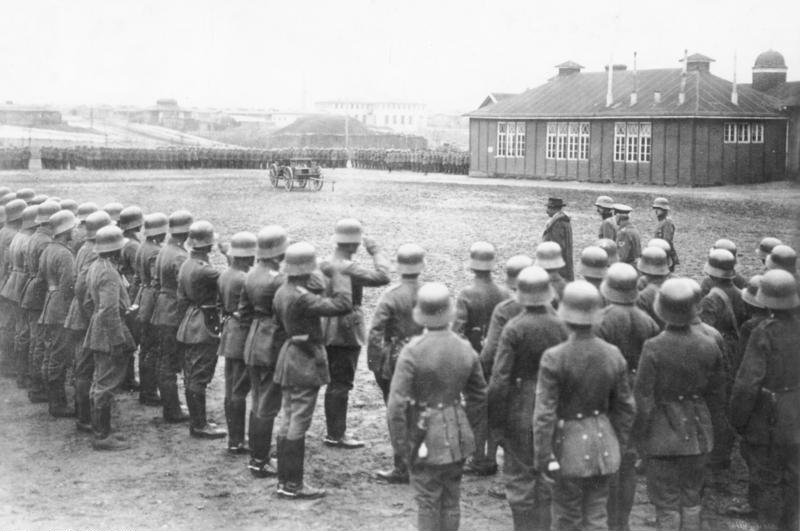
Minister of the Reichswehr, Gustav Noske, visits the Freikorps Hülsen in Berlin in January 1919.

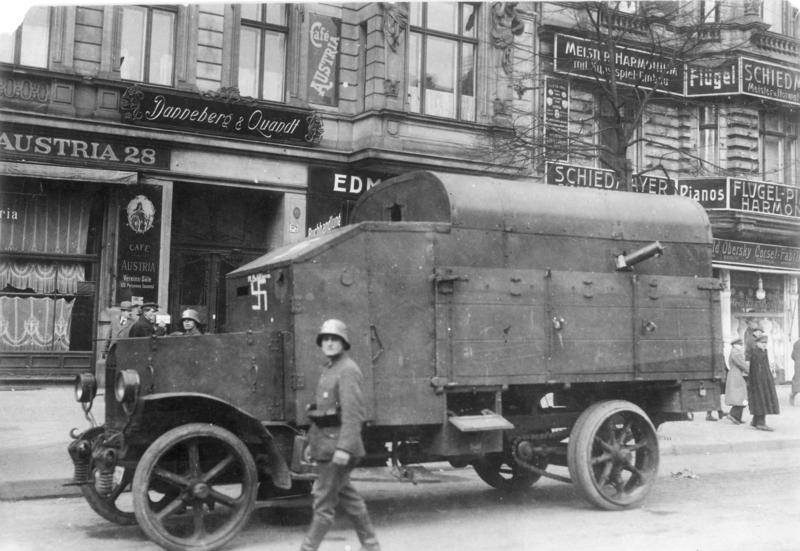
Provisional Freikorps armored vehicle in Berlin during the Kapp Putsch of March 1920

After World War I, the meaning of the word Freikorps changed from its earlier iterations. After 1918, the term referred to various—yet still loosely affiliated—paramilitary organizations established in Germany following Germany's defeat in World War I. Of the numerous Weimar paramilitary groups active during that time, the Freikorps were, and remain, the most notable. While numbers are difficult to determine, historians agree that some 500,000 men were formal Freikorps members, with another 1.5 million men participating informally.

Amongst the social, political, and economic upheavals that marked the early years of the Weimar Republic, the tenuous German government under Friedrich Ebert, leader of the Social Democratic Party of Germany (Sozialdemokratische Partei Deutschlands, SPD), used the Freikorps to quell socialist and communist uprisings. Minister of Defence and SPD member Gustav Noske also relied on the Freikorps to suppress the Marxist Spartacist uprising, culminating in the summary executions of revolutionary communist leaders Karl Liebknecht and Rosa Luxemburg on 15 January 1919.

=== Freikorps involvement in Germany and Eastern Europe ===
==== Bavarian Soviet Republic ====
The Bavarian Soviet Republic was a short-lived and unrecognized socialist-communist state in Bavaria from 12 April – 3 May 1919 during the German Revolution of 1918–19. Following a series of political revolts and takeovers from German socialists and then Russian-backed Bolsheviks, Gustav Noske responded from Berlin by sending various Freikorps brigades to Bavaria in late April totalling some 30,000 men. The brigades included Hermann Ehrhardt's second Marine Brigade Freikorps, the Görlitz Freikorps under Lieutenant Colonel Faupel, and two Swabian divisions from Württemberg under General Haas and Major Hirl as well as the largest Freikorps in Bavaria commanded by Colonel Franz Ritter von Epp.

While they were met with little Communist resistance, the Freikorps acted with particular brutality and violence under Noske's blessing and at the behest of Major Schulz, adjutant of the Lützow Freikorps, who reminded his men that it "[was] a lot better to kill a few innocent people than to let one guilty person escape" and that there was no place in his ranks for those whose conscience bothered them. On 5 May 1919, Lieutenant Georg Pölzing, one of Schulz's officers, travelled to the town of Perlach outside of Munich. There, Pölzing chose a dozen alleged communist workers—none of whom were actually communists, but members of the Social Democratic Party—and shot them on the spot. The following day, a Freikorps patrol led by Captain Alt-Sutterheim interrupted the meeting of a local Catholic club, the St Joseph Society, and chose twenty of the thirty members present to be shot, beaten, and bayoneted to death. A memorial on Pfanzeltplatz in Munich commemorates the incident. Historian Nigel Jones notes that as a result of the Freikorps' violence, Munich's undertakers were overwhelmed, resulting in bodies lying in the streets and decaying until mass graves were completed.

==== Eastern Europe ====
The Freikorps also fought against communists and Bolsheviks in Eastern Europe, most notably East Prussia, Latvia, Silesia, and Poland. The Freikorps demonstrated fervent anti-Slavic racism and viewed Slavs and Bolsheviks as "sub-human" hordes of "ravening wolves". To justify their campaign in the East, the Freikorps launched a campaign of propaganda that positioned themselves as protectors of Germany's territorial hegemony over Lithuania, Latvia, and Estonia as a result of the Treaty of Brest-Litovsk and as defenders against Slavic and Bolshevik hordes that "raped women and butchered children" in their wake. Historian Nigel Jones highlights the Freikorps's "usual excesses" of violence and murder in Latvia, which were all the more unrestrained since they were fighting in a foreign land versus their own country. Hundreds were murdered in the Freikorps' Eastern campaigns, such as the massacre of 500 Latvian civilians suspected of harbouring Bolshevik sympathies or the capture of Riga, which saw the Freikorps slaughter some 3,000 people. Summary executions via firing squads were most common, but several Freikorps members recorded the brutal and deadly beatings of suspected communists and particularly communist women.

=== Freikorps identity and ideals ===
Freikorps ranks were composed primarily of former World War I soldiers who, upon demobilization, were unable to reintegrate into civilian society, having been brutalized by the violence of the war physically and mentally. Combined with the government's poor support of veterans, who were dismissed as hysterical when suffering from post-traumatic stress disorder, many German veterans found comfort and a sense of belonging in the Freikorps. Jason Crouthamel notes how the Freikorps' military structure was a familiar continuation of the frontlines, emulating the Kampfgemeinschaft (battle community) and Kameradschaft (camaraderie), thus preserving "the heroic spirit of comradeship in the trenches". Others, angry at Germany's sudden, seemingly inexplicable defeat, joined the Freikorps to fight against communism and socialism in Germany or to exact some form of revenge on those they considered responsible. To a lesser extent, German youth who were not old enough to have served in World War I enlisted in the Freikorps in hopes of proving themselves as patriots and as men.

Regardless of reasons for joining, modern German historians agree that men of the Freikorps consistently embodied post-Enlightenment masculine ideals that are characterized by "physical, emotional, and moral 'hardness'". Described as "children of the trenches, spawned by war" and its process of brutalization, historians argue that Freikorps men idealized a militarized masculinity of aggression, physical domination, the absence of emotion (hardness). They were to be as "swift as greyhounds, tough as leather, [and] hard as Krupp steel" to defend what remained of German conservatism in times of social chaos, confusion, and revolution that came to define the immediate interwar era. Although World War I ended in Germany's surrender, many men in the Freikorps nonetheless viewed themselves as soldiers still engaged in active warfare with enemies of the traditional German Empire such as communists and Bolsheviks, Jews, socialists, and pacifists. Prominent Freikorps member Ernst von Salomon described his troops as "full of wild demand for revenge and action and adventure...a band of fighter...full of lust, exultant in anger."

In 1977, German sociologist Klaus Theweleit published Male Fantasies, in which he argues that men in the Freikorps radicalized Western and German norms of male self-control into a perpetual war against feminine-coded desires for domesticity, tenderness, and compassion amongst men. Historians Nigel Jones and Thomas Kühne note that the Freikorps' displays of violence, terror, and male aggression and solidarity established the beginnings of the fascist New Man upon which the Nazis built.

=== Demobilization ===
The extent of the Freikorps' involvement and actions in Eastern Europe, where they demonstrated full autonomy and rejected orders from the Reichswehr and German government, left a negative impression on the state. By this time, the Freikorps had served Ebert's purpose of suppressing revolts and communist uprisings. After the failed Kapp-Lütwitz Putsch in March 1920, in which the Freikorps participated, the Freikorps' autonomy and strength steadily declined as Hans von Seeckt, commander of the Reichswehr, removed all Freikorps members from the army and restricted the Freikorps' access to future funding and equipment from the government. Von Seeckt was successful, and by 1921 only a small yet devoted core remained, effectively drawing an end to the Freikorps until their resurgence as far-right thugs and street brawlers for the Nazis beginning in 1923.

=== Cooperation with the Reichswehr ===
Wherever the Treaty of Versailles tied the Reichswehr's hands or its own manpower was insufficient, it left 'national defence' – e.g. border skirmishes against Polish and Lithuanian irregulars, or deployment in 1920 against the Ruhr uprising in the demilitarised Rhineland – to the Freikorps, which continued to operate even though it had been officially disbanded in 1920. In 1923 General von Seeckt, who had the backing of Otto Gessler, organised "civilian work groups" called Arbeits-Kommandos (AKs) that were attached to Reichswehr units and received training and support from them. The AKs, better known as the Black Reichswehr, whose members were largely ex-Freikorps, had a peak strength of about 20,000 men and allowed the Reichswehr to clandestinely exceed the Versailles Treaty's 100,000-man limit. On 1 October 1923, about 4,000 of its members attempted a putsch at Küstrin on the Oder river east of Berlin. After its failure, Seeckt quickly had the Black Reichswehr disbanded.

Reichswehr generals also maintained close contacts with politically right-wing, anti-republican military associations such as the Stahlhelm and Kyffhäuserbund, although the Reichswehr officially described itself as "apolitical".

=== Affiliation with the Nazi Party ===
The rise of the Nazi Party led to a resurgence of Freikorps activity, as many members or ex-members were drawn to the party's marrying of military and political life and extreme nationalism by joining the Sturmabteilung (SA) and Schutzstaffel (SS). Unlike in the German Revolution of 1918–19 or their involvement in Eastern Europe, the Freikorps now had almost no military value and were instead utilized by the Nazis as thugs to engage in street brawls with communists and to break up anarchist, communist and socialist meetings alongside the SA to gain a political edge. Moreover, the Nazis elevated the Freikorps as a symbol of pure German nationalism, anti-communism, and militarized masculinity to co-opt the lingering social and political support of the movement.

Eventually, Adolf Hitler came to view the Freikorps as a nuisance and possible threat to his consolidation of power. During the Night of the Long Knives in 1934, an internal purge of Hitler's enemies within the Nazi Party, numerous Freikorps members and leaders were targeted for killing or arrest, including Freikorps commander Hermann Ehrhardt and SA leader Ernst Röhm. In Hitler's Reichstag speech following the purge, Hitler denounced the Freikorps as lawless "moral degenerates...aimed at the destruction of all existing institutions" and as "pathological enemies of the state...[and] enemies of all authority," despite his previous public adoration of the movement.

=== Nazi legacy ===
Numerous future members and leaders of the Nazi Party served in the Freikorps. Martin Bormann, eventual head of the Nazi Party Chancellery and Private Secretary to Hitler, joined Gerhard Roßbach's Freikorps in Mecklenburg as a section leader and quartermaster. Reich Farmers' Leader and Minister of Food and Agriculture Richard Walther Darré was part of the Berlin Freikorps. Reinhard Heydrich, future chief of the Reich Security Main Office (including the Gestapo, Kripo, and SD) and initiator of the Final Solution, was in Georg Ludwig Rudolf Maercker's Freikorps as a teenager. Leader of the SS Heinrich Himmler enlisted in the Freikorps and carried a flag in the 1923 Beer Hall Putsch. Rudolf Höss joined the East Prussian Volunteer Freikorps in 1919 and eventually became commander of the Auschwitz extermination camp. Ernst Röhm, eventual leader of the SA, supported various Bavarian Freikorps groups, funnelling them arms and cash. Although many high-ranking National Socialists were former Freikorps fighters, recent research shows that former Freikorps fighters were no more likely to be involved in National Socialist organisations than the average male population in Germany.

A recruitment poster for the Freikorps Hülsen

== Freikorps groups and divisions ==
- Iron Division ('Eiserne Division', formerly Eiserne Brigade, related to the Baltische Landeswehr)
  - Fought in the Baltics
  - Defeated by the Estonian Army and Latvian Army in the Battle of Cēsis
  - Trapped in Thorensberg by the Latvian Army. Rescued by Freikorps Roßbach
- Volunteer Division of the Horse Guards (Garde-Kavallerie-Schützendivision)
  - Killed Rosa Luxemburg and Karl Liebknecht, 15 January 1919
  - Led by Captain Waldemar Pabst
  - Disbanded on order of Defence Minister Gustav Noske, 7 July 1919, after Pabst threatened to kill him
- Freikorps Caspari
  - Fought against the Bremen Soviet Republic
  - Fought under the command of Walter Caspari
- Freikorps Lichtschlag
  - Fought against the Red Ruhr Army
  - Fought under the command of Oskar von Watter
- Freikorps Epp
  - Under the command of Franz Ritter von Epp
  - Members include: Ernst Röhm, Rudolf Hess, Eduard Dietl, Hans Frank, Gregor Strasser and Otto Strasser
- Freikorps Lützow
  - Occupied Munich following the revolution of April 1919
  - Commanded by Major Schulz
- Marinebrigade Ehrhardt (The Second Naval Brigade)
  - Participated in the Kapp Putsch of 1920
  - Disbanded members eventually formed the Organisation Consul, which performed hundreds of political assassinations
- Marinebrigade Loewenfeld (The Third Naval Brigade)
  - Participated in the Kapp Putsch of 1920
- Freikorps Maercker (Maercker's Volunteer Rifles, or Freiwilliges Landesjägerkorps)
  - Founded by Ludwig Maercker
  - Members include: Reinhard Heydrich, Eggert Reeder, Ernst von Salomon, Alfred Toepfer and Walter Warlimont
- Freikorps Oberland
  - Kurt Benson
- Freikorps Roßbach (Rossbach)
  - Founded by Gerhard Roßbach
  - Rescued the Iron Division after an extremely long march across Eastern Europe
  - Members include: Kurt Daluege, Rudolph Hoess, Martin Bormann, and Ernst Krull (who was tried for his involvement in the murder of Rosa Luxemburg)
- Sudetendeutsches Freikorps
  - Formed by Czech German nationalists with Nazi sympathies, which operated from 1938 to 1939
  - Part of Hitler's successful effort to absorb Czechoslovakia into the Third Reich

== World War II ==
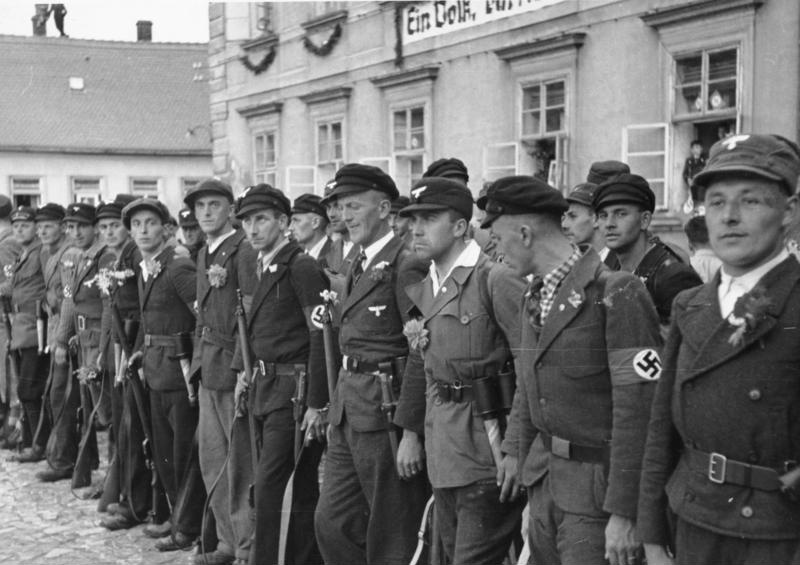
Sudetendeutsches Freikorps members

During World War II, there existed certain armed groups loyal to Germany that went under the name "Freikorps". These include:

- Sudetendeutsches Freikorps, a German nationalist paramilitary that fought against Czechoslovakia for annexation of the Sudetenland into Germany.
- Free Corps Denmark, a Danish volunteer collaborationist group in the Waffen-SS that was founded by the National Socialist Workers' Party of Denmark, and participated in the invasion of the Soviet Union.
- British Free Corps, a Waffen-SS unit made up of former British Commonwealth prisoners of war.
- Freikorps Sauerland
- Sabotage groups in Poland, active during the German invasion of Poland

== See also ==
- Asgaard PMC
- Freikorps Awards
- Battle of Annaberg
- Heimwehr
- List of defunct paramilitary organizations
- List of Freikorps members
- List of paramilitary organizations
- Organisation Consul
- Radical anti-communism
- Viking League related Freikorps activities
