= Ludwig Stenglein =

German jurist (1869–1936)

Georg Ludwig Richard Stenglein (27 December 1869 – 12 November 1936) was a German jurist. He served as the lead prosecutor in the 1924 Hitler trial.

== Early life and career ==
Stenglein was the son of auditing commissioner Johann Georg Stenglein and his wife Luise, née Stiegler. He had been a member of the Corps Palatia Munich since 1891.

He began his legal career as a third-level public prosecutor (Staatsanwalt) in Landshut in 1898. He was promoted to second-level public prosecutor in Passau in 1901. In 1905, he became a judge (Landgerichtsrat) at the regional court in Ansbach. By 1913, he had advanced to the position of senior district judge (Oberamtsrichter) in Nuremberg, where he became a local court judge (Amtsgerichtsrat) in 1919.

== Judicial career in Munich ==
In 1923, Stenglein was appointed as the supervising senior public prosecutor (dienstaufsichtsführender erster Staatsanwalt) in Munich. He moved to Bamberg in 1926 to serve as president of the regional court (Landgerichtspräsident). By 1928, he had returned to Munich as president of the Munich I Regional Court. In 1933, he was appointed senate president (Senatspräsident) at the Bavarian Supreme Court (Bayerisches Oberstes Landesgericht) in Munich.

Stenglein's career ended under political pressure from the new Nazi regime. On 1 January 1934, he was advised to retire because he had intervened with the Ministry of Justice against the politically motivated forced retirement of his colleague, prosecutor Martin Dresse, and had taken responsibility for Dresse's conduct. He was told that if he wished to show solidarity with Dresse, he could leave as well and was at liberty to submit a pension request. Following his retirement, he and his wife lived in Mehlem, a district of Bad Godesberg, from mid-1935.

Stenglein was a member of the Nazi Party (NSDAP) from 1 May 1933 until August 1936. His membership lapsed because he was removed from the party rolls for failure to pay dues.

Stenglein died in Cologne-Lindenthal on 12 November 1936. He was initially buried at Cologne's Melaten Cemetery on 14 November 1936. His remains were reinterred at the Nordfriedhof in Munich on 30 March 1954.

== Hitler trial ==
As the senior public prosecutor in Munich, Stenglein was the lead prosecutor (Ankläger) in the 1924 Hitler trial. His assistants were second prosecutors Hans Ehard and Martin Dresse. In his sentencing recommendation (Strafantrag), Stenglein demanded eight years of fortress imprisonment for Adolf Hitler for high treason. The Bavarian People's Court, under presiding judge Georg Neithardt, did not follow his recommendation. On 1 April 1924, it sentenced Hitler to the minimum penalty of five years.

Stenglein decisively rejected an early release of the convicted putschists on probation: "the granting of a probationary period [is] to be rejected, as there can be no talk of the convicts turning away from their intentions dangerous to the state ... and the convicts have not conducted themselves during the period of sentence execution in such a way that the expectation would be justified that they would also behave well in the future without the full execution."

Nevertheless, Hitler and the other accomplices still in custody were released on probation from Landsberg Fortress on 20 December 1924.

== See also ==
- Beer Hall Putsch trial
