= Sondergericht =

Special court in Nazi Germany

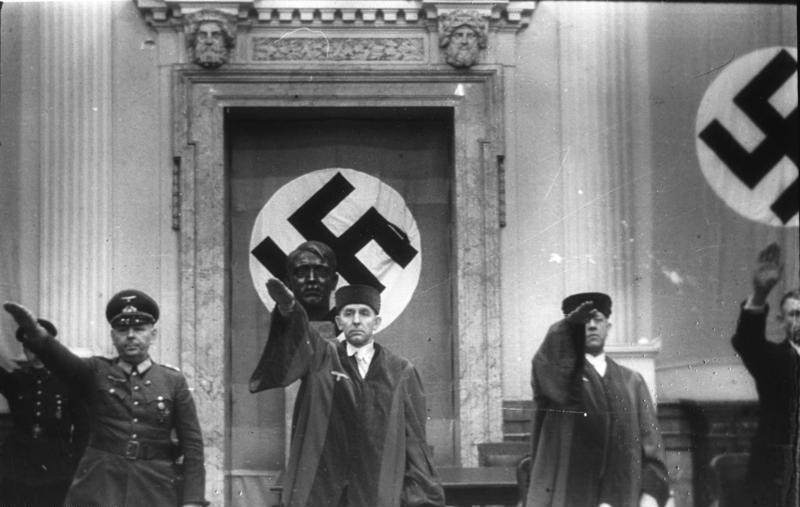
Judge Roland Freisler (centre) at the People's Court

A Sondergericht (plural: Sondergerichte) was a German "special court". After taking power in 1933, the Nazis quickly moved to remove internal opposition to the Nazi regime in Germany. The legal system became one of many tools for this aim and the Nazis gradually supplanted the normal justice system with political courts with wide-ranging powers. The function of the special courts was to intimidate the German public, but as they expanded their scope and took over roles previously done by ordinary courts such as Amtsgerichte this function became diluted.

== Function in Germany ==
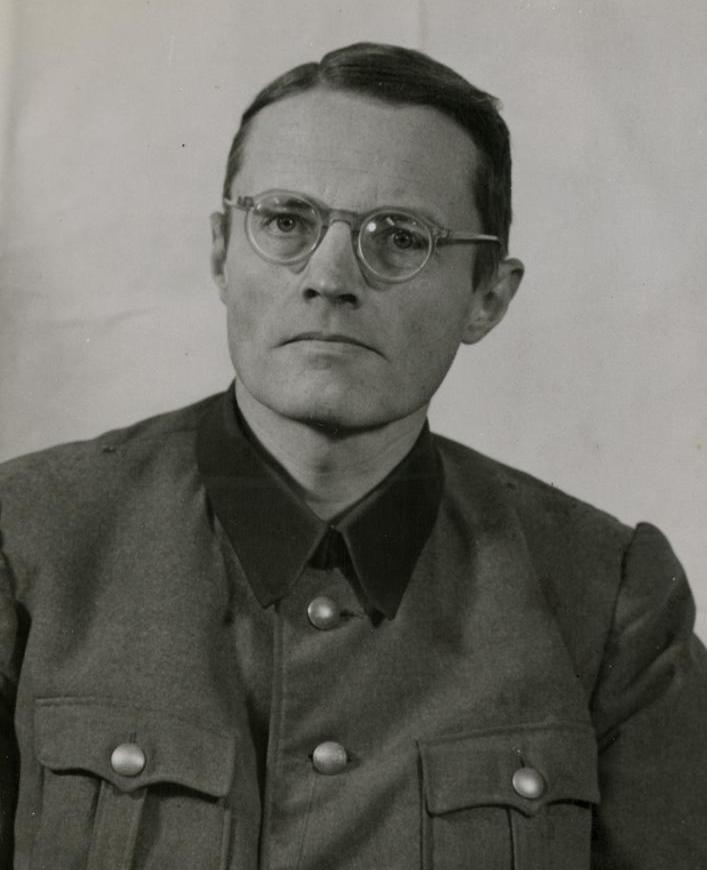
Hermann Cuhorst (1899–1991), Chief Justice of the Special Court in Stuttgart.

Special courts had existed in Germany as far back as the nineteenth century. They had generally been set up temporarily in response to some major but localised civil disturbance and then quickly dissolved once they had served their purpose. A more permanent national network of Special Courts came into being during 1933, soon after the passage of the Reichstag Fire Decree, which all but eliminated civil liberties. The scope of its power was successively augmented by the

- "Decree to Protect the Government of the National Socialist Revolution from Treacherous Attacks" (21 March 1933),
- the "Law of 20 December 1934 against insidious Attacks upon the State and Party and for the Protection of the Party Uniform",
- the "Law for the Guarantee of Peace Based on Law" of 13 October 1933
- and a number of extensions when World War II commenced.

The number of Special Courts increased from 26 in 1933 to 74 in 1942.

A special court had three judges, and the defense counsel was appointed by the court. Even as heavy-handed as justice was in Nazi Germany, defendants were afforded at least nominal protections under the regular courts' rules and procedures. These protections were swept away in the special courts, since they existed outside the ordinary judicial system. There was no possibility of appeal, and verdicts could be executed at once. The court decided the extent of evidence to consider, and "the defense attorneys couldn't question the proof of the charges".

== Occupied Poland ==
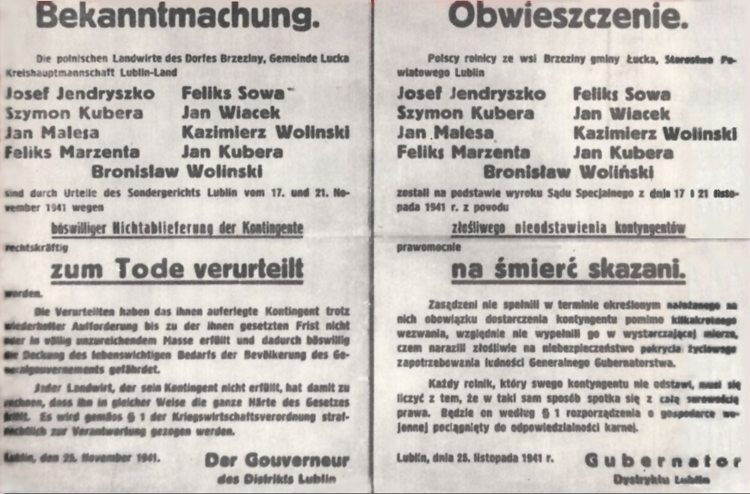
German announcement of the execution of 9 Polish farmers for not fulfilling quotas. Signed by the governor of Lublin district on 25 November 1941

The special courts played a major role in carrying out summary executions via judicial murder in Nazi occupied Poland. In December 1941, a special law was introduced by the Germans which allowed for the courts to sentence Poles and Jews to death for virtually anything. Terminology in the courts was full of statements such as "Polish subhumans" and "Polish rabble", with some judges even declaring that Poles were to have lengthier sentences than Germans since they were racially inferior.

== Other occupied territories ==
In countries under German military occupation, such as Norway, Sondergerichte were also set up. Special penal codes were set up, e.g. the Polensonderstrafrechtsverordnung (Poland Special Criminal Law Regulation).

== Germany (1934–1945) ==
The People's Court (Volksgerichtshof) was created in April 1934 for dealing with cases of treason or attacks on national or regional government members.

The reason the court was created was dissatisfaction with the fact that most of the Communists that had been charged with burning down the Reichstag were acquitted. The function of this court was just as that of the special courts, to suppress opposition to the regime.

The workload was divided between the People's Courts and the Special Courts in such a way that the former took the most important cases, while the latter dealt with a wider array of "crimes" of opposition to the Nazis.

== Bavaria (1918–1924) ==
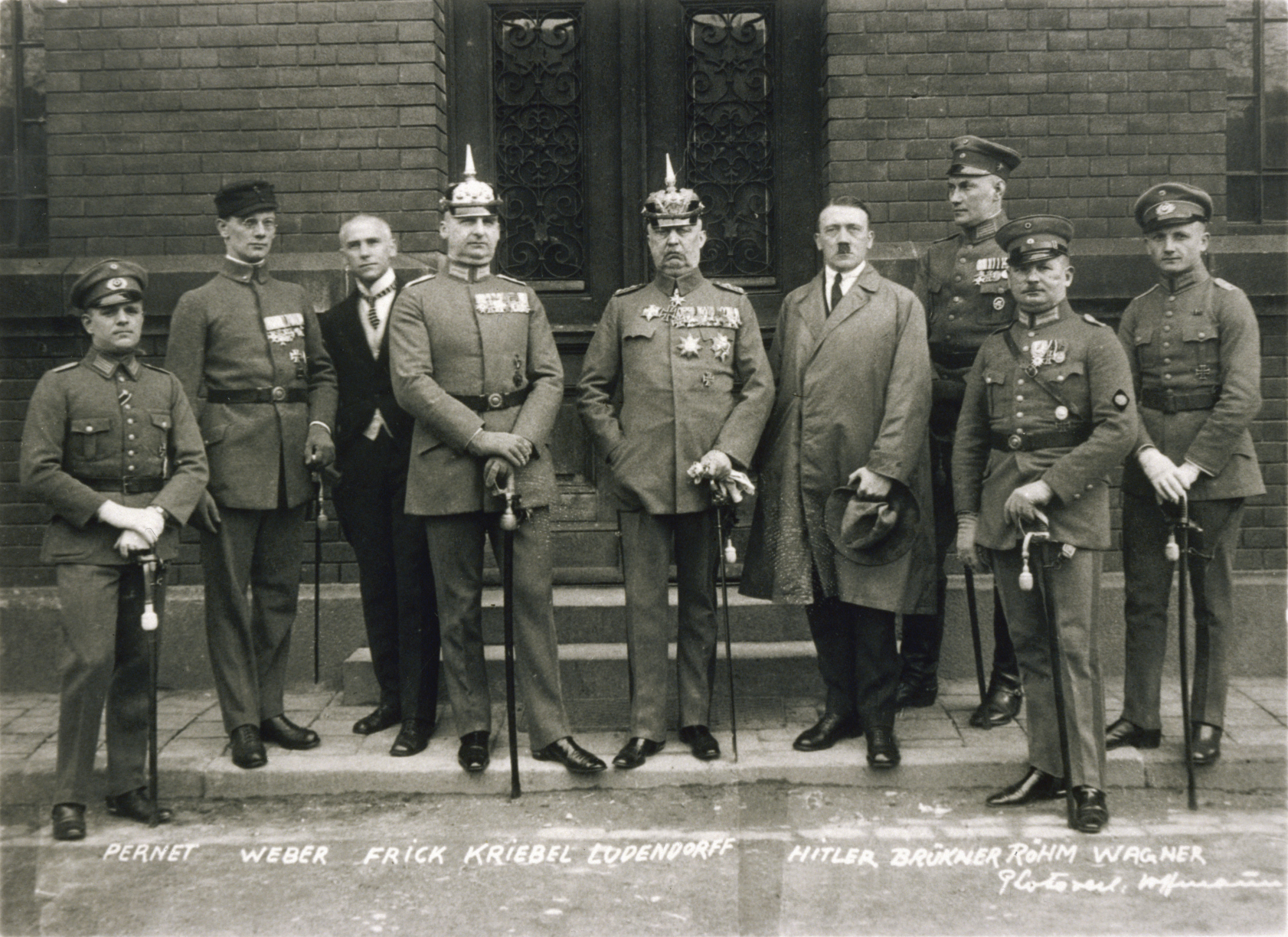
Defendants in the Beer Hall Putsch trial at the People's Court in Munich. Adolf Hitler is fourth from right.

The People's Courts of Bavaria (Volksgerichte) were special courts established by Kurt Eisner during the German Revolution in November 1918 and part of the Ordnungszelle that lasted until May 1924 after handing out more than 31,000 sentences. It was composed of two judges and three lay judges. One of its most notable trials was that of the Beer Hall Putsch conspirators, including Adolf Hitler, Erich Ludendorff, Wilhelm Frick, Friedrich Weber, and Ernst Röhm.

== Effect ==
Between 1933 and 1945, 12,000 Germans were executed on the orders of the Sondergerichte set up by the Nazi regime.

Especially during the first years of their existence they "had a strong deterrent effect" against opposition to the Nazis; the German public was intimidated through "arbitrary psychological terror".

== Prominent defendants ==
- Martin Niemöller
- Rupert Mayer
- Artur Dinter
- Paul Ogorzow

== See also ==
- Nacht und Nebel
