= Beer Hall Putsch trial =

1924 trial of Adolf Hitler and others

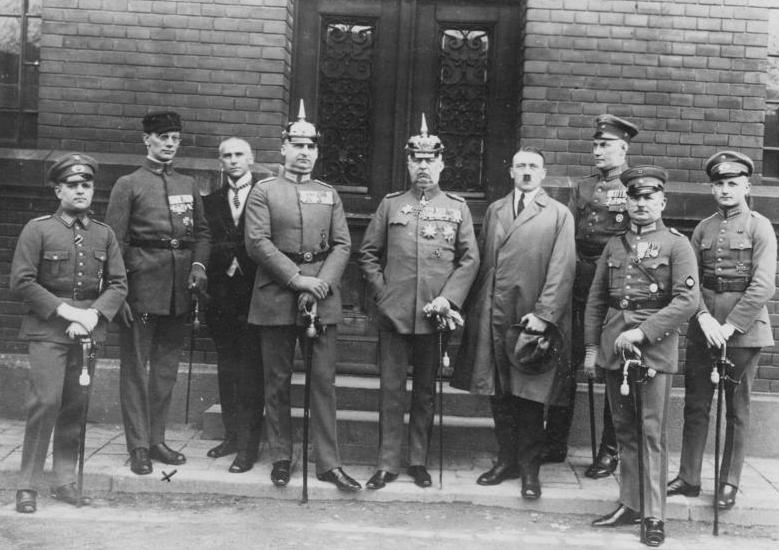
- The defendants, from left to right: Heinz Pernet, Friedrich Weber, Wilhelm Frick, Hermann Kriebel, Erich Ludendorff, Adolf Hitler, Wilhelm Brückner, Ernst Röhm, Robert Wagner (1 April 1924)
- Court: People's Court, Munich I
- Full case name: Public Prosecutor v. Adolf Hitler et al.
- Argued: 26 February – 1 April 1924
- Decided: 1 April 1924
- Verdict: Guilty (except Ludendorff)
- Defendants: Adolf Hitler; Erich Ludendorff; Heinz Pernet; Friedrich Weber; Hermann Kriebel; Ernst Röhm; Ernst Pöhner; Wilhelm Frick; Wilhelm Brückner; Robert Wagner
- Charge: High treason
- Prosecution: Ludwig Stenglein (lead prosecutor); Hans Ehard; Martin Dresse
- Defence: Lorenz Roder (for Hitler)

Case history
- Subsequent actions: Hitler, Weber, Kriebel, Pöhner: 5 years' Festungshaft (fortress detention); Brückner, Röhm, Pernet, Wagner, Frick: 15 months' detention (for complicity)

Court membership
- Judges sitting: Georg Neithardt (presiding); August Leyendecker; Leonhard Beck (lay judge); Philipp Herrmann (lay judge); Christian Zimmermann (lay judge)

The Beer Hall Putsch trial (also known as the Hitler trial or Hitler-Ludendorff trial) was the criminal proceeding against Adolf Hitler and other leaders of the failed coup attempt of 9 November 1923. The trial was held from 26 February to 1 April 1924 before the Bavarian People's Court in Munich.

The conduct of the trial by presiding judge Georg Neithardt, who imposed far milder sentences than prescribed by law, was widely considered a judicial scandal even at the time. Hitler used the proceedings to portray himself as a selfless politician motivated by patriotic goals. This increased his popularity in anti-democratic and anti-republican circles both within and outside Bavaria and helped him later emerge as the undisputed leader of the Völkisch movement.

== Hitler's arrest ==
After the failed coup attempt of 9 November 1923, Hitler fled Munich. He was given shelter by Helene Hanfstaengl, whose husband Ernst Hanfstaengl had also been involved in the putsch, at her villa in Uffing am Staffelsee. The following day, physician Walter Schultze came to the villa with an assistant in order to reset Hitler's shoulder, which had been dislocated during the events in Munich.

On Sunday, 11 November, at 16:20, First Lieutenant Rudolf Belleville, the local commander of the Bavarian State Police in Weilheim in Oberbayern, received a telephone order to arrest Hitler at the Hanfstaengl villa. In Uffing, Belleville, accompanied by ten state police officers and a gendarme, first searched the villa of Hanfstaengl's mother, Katharina, for an hour and a half. Only after a direct telephone call with Helene Hanfstaengl did they proceed to her villa. According to Hanfstaengl's memoirs, Helene then snatched the pistol from Hitler, which he had already held to his temple intending suicide.

Hitler was arrested without resistance by Belleville, with whom he was personally acquainted. The detachment drove back to Weilheim with Hitler, and at 10:45 the next day, Hitler, accompanied by 39 guards, was delivered to the Landsberg Fortress Prison.

== Preparation of the trial ==
Hitler was placed in cell no. 7, where Anton Graf von Arco auf Valley had previously been imprisoned. On the second day of his imprisonment, he was interrogated by assistant prosecutor Hans Ehard. Hitler only agreed to speak after the minute-taker had left the room. He denied committing high treason, arguing that the "crime" of the November Revolution remained unpunished. He claimed that Gustav von Kahr, Otto von Lossow, and Hans von Seißer had been preparing the overthrow with him for months. Ehard's report of this interview from memory formed the basis of the indictment.

Jurisdiction for the high treason trial would normally have lain with the Reich Court in Leipzig. However, the proceedings instead took place before the Bavarian People's Court at the Munich I Regional Court, a deliberate case of perversion of justice accepted by the Bavarian government, as this special court was by then unconstitutional. Four separate proceedings were initiated: 1) against Hitler and the other leaders of the putsch, 2) against the assault squad (Stoßtrupp), 3) against Karl Beggel and Hans Knauth for the theft of banknotes from printing works, and 4) against those responsible for the raid on the St. Anna Monastery.

== The trial ==
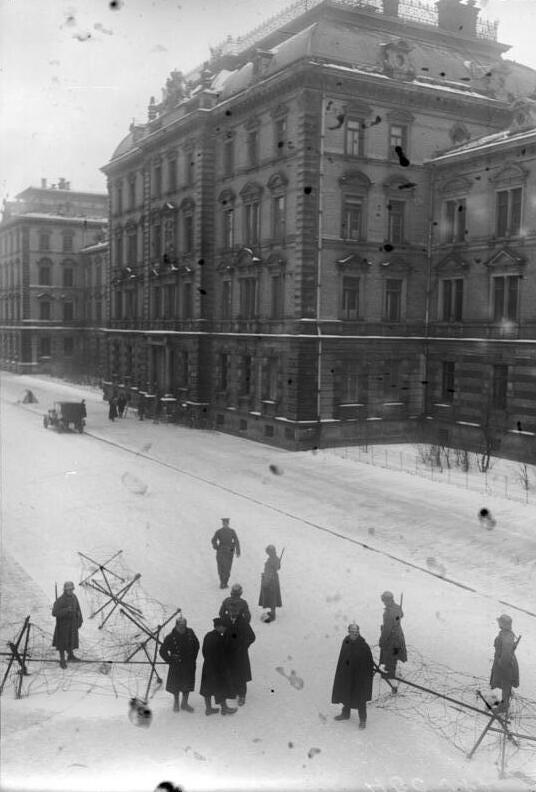
The Infantry School where the trial took place (February 1924)

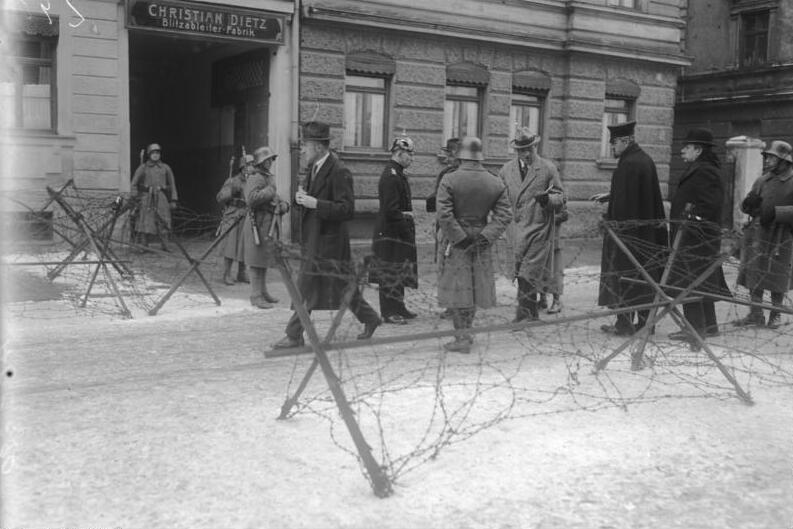
Passport checks in the vicinity of the Infantry School (February 1924)

The high treason trial began on the morning of 26 February 1924 in the main reading room of the Infantry School. Present were 368 witnesses, correspondents from around the world, and hundreds of spectators with reserved seats. Two battalions of the state police cordoned off Mars and Blutenburg streets with barbed wire and Spanish riders.

The ten defendants were Adolf Hitler, Erich Ludendorff, Heinz Pernet, Friedrich Weber, Hermann Kriebel, Ernst Röhm, Ernst Pöhner, Wilhelm Frick, Wilhelm Brückner and Robert Wagner. Rudolf Hess had initially gone into hiding and later surrendered to the court; Hermann Göring had fled abroad.

The prosecutor was Ludwig Stenglein, assisted by Hans Ehard and second prosecutor Martin Dresse. The court presidency was held by the right-wing nationalist Georg Neithardt, with judges August Leyendecker and the lay judges (Schöffen) Philipp Herrmann, Christian Zimmermann, and Leonhard Beck. Hitler's defense attorney was lawyer Lorenz Roder. The indictment described Hitler as "the soul of the whole enterprise". Neithardt arbitrarily replaced an incriminating record of Ludendorff's interrogation with another stating that Ludendorff had known nothing about the coup preparations; accordingly, Ludendorff was not held in custody.

Neithardt only swore in the witnesses for the defense, not those for the prosecution. The defendants pleaded "not guilty". Although the indictment was formally "against Ludendorff et al.", Hitler, who appeared wearing his Iron Cross First Class on his lapel, assumed sole responsibility for the putsch. With applause from spectators, he declared there could be no high treason against the "traitors of 1918". He accused Kahr, Lossow, and Seißer of betrayal, claiming they had planned the coup with him for weeks but then turned against him and the German people.

The witnesses Kahr (an aspiring dictator), Lossow (commander of the Bavarian civil war army), both by then dismissed, and Seißer were harshly attacked by Hitler. The presiding judge mostly allowed Hitler to interrogate them repeatedly in the manner of a prosecutor and discredit their statements, forcing the prosecutor to defend them. Seißer accused Hitler of sole responsibility for the enterprise, thereby confirming Hitler's own claim. The accused Pöhner stated that the institutions and laws of the Weimar Republic were not binding on him. Prosecutor Hans Ehard appeared to be working seriously towards a conviction during these proceedings, but his objections and motions were repeatedly overruled.

Twenty-five days were taken up by witness testimony and discussions, from which the public and press were largely excluded "for security reasons". On 27 March 1924, the defendants were allowed to give final statements. Hitler first argued that, despite his humble origins, he felt called to lead a people. He then accused Ebert and Scheidemann of treason and proclaimed his belief in a future reconciliation with those "who shot at us". Finally, he denied the court's right to pronounce a guilty verdict:

You may find us guilty a thousand times over, the goddess of the eternal court of history will smilingly tear up the motion of the prosecution and the judgment of the court; for she acquits us.

—

Prosecutor Stenglein combined his sentencing recommendation with many words of praise for Hitler.

=== The lay judges ===
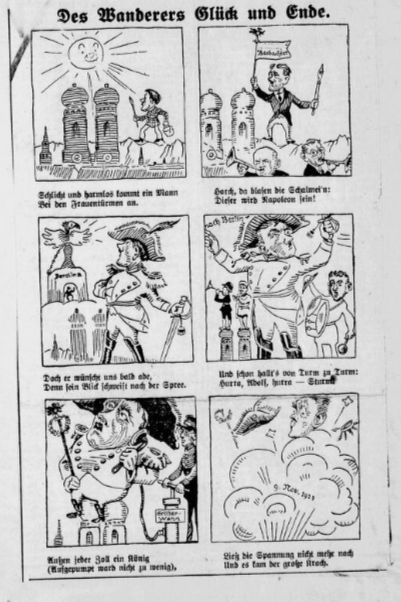
Contemporary caricature of the failed putsch and the supposed end of Hitler's political career.

The three lay judges at the People's Court who participated were Leonhard Beck, (Note: Leonhard Maximilian Michael Beck (born 6 May 1867 in Schwandorn) was a bookbinder's assistant and auxiliary policeman, resident in Munich since December 1885 (last at Schmellerstraße 32/0) and moved to Mittenwalde in September 1943. He was married to Anna Frank (born 31 January 1863 in Oberviechtach).) Philipp Hermann, (Note: Franz Rudolph Philipp Hermann (born 21 October 1865 in Nuremberg; died 10 January 1930 in Munich) was a clerk and insurance official. He had been resident in Munich since October 1886 (last at Tumblingerstraße 7/I) and was married to Margaret Förtsch (born 15 July 1863 in Stadtsteinach).) and Christian Zimmermann. (Note: Christian Anton Zimmermann, originally (until 1886) Fratton (born 18 April 1858 in Tegernsee) was an insurance inspector for Munich Re. He lived in Munich since 1887 (last at Humboldtstraße 9/3) and was married to Maria Hierl (born 25 June 1866 in Munich).) According to research by Andreas Stenglein, these three men played the "most absurd role" by informing the presiding judge at the trial's outset that they would only agree to convict Hitler if the sentence were suspended. Since the court required a four-vote majority for decisions, the presiding judge was compelled to compromise to avoid the trial's collapse. Otherwise, the case would have been transferred to the competent Leipzig Reich Court, which the Bavarian government desperately wanted to avoid. Consequently, Hitler received, as the lay judges desired, only the minimum sentence of five years with a promise of probation, not the eight years requested by the prosecutor. Thus, the three lay judges, "like no one else," according to Stenglein, acted as "key figures" in paving Hitler's path to power nine years later. Lothar Gruchmann similarly judged: "Decisive for the court's decision to grant probation along with the verdict was the attitude of the lay judges." Lay judges Philipp Hermann and Leonhard Beck confirmed this in a letter of 6 July 1924 to the Munich I Public Prosecutor's Office: "Only on the general condition that probation was granted, and specifically promised for Hitler [...] could the lay judges bring themselves to the extraordinarily difficult decision to agree to the guilty verdict." All three lay judges never joined the NSDAP and were not subjected to denazification proceedings after 1945.

== The verdict ==
=== Proceedings against the main perpetrators ===
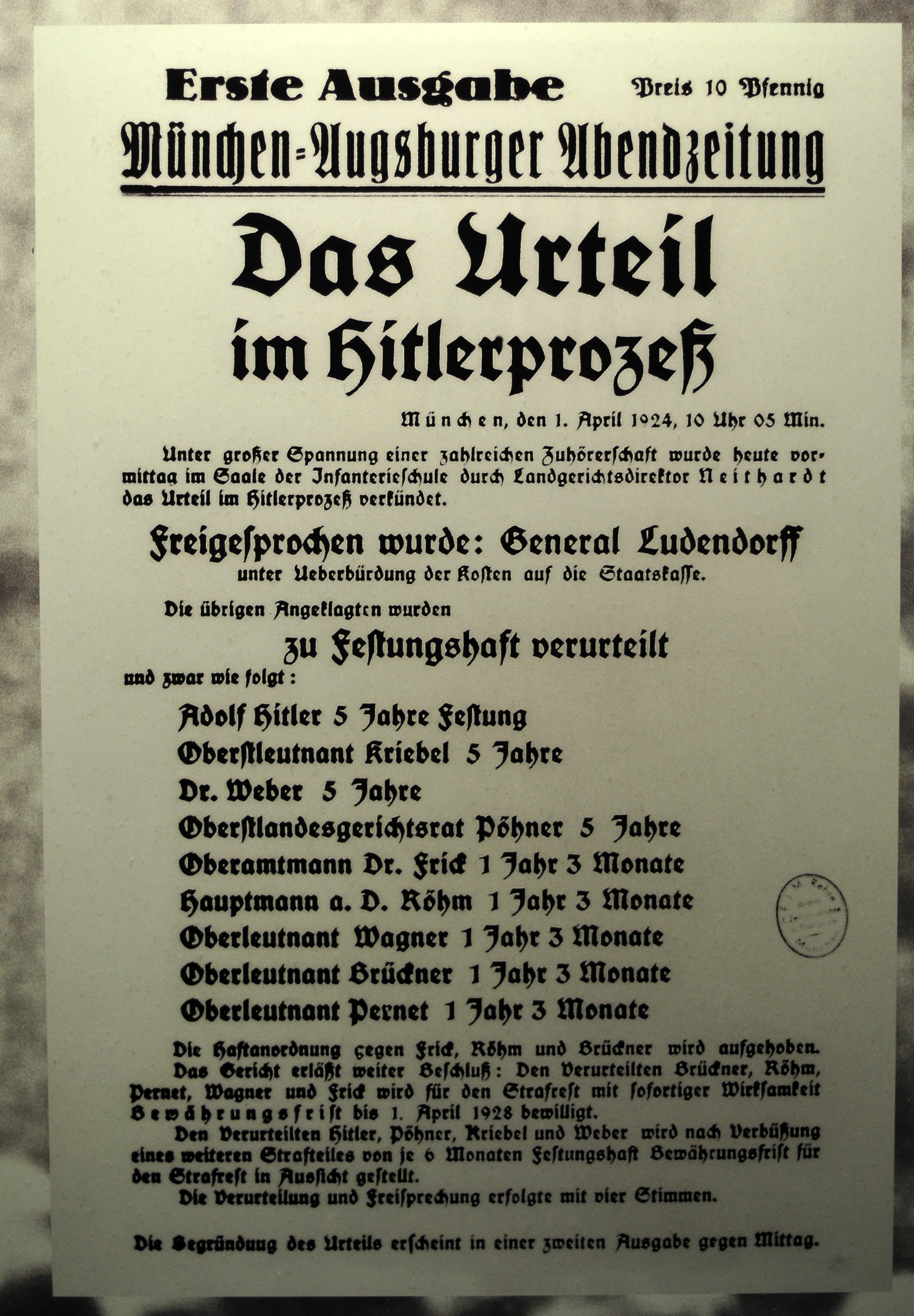
Headline of the München-Augsburger Abendzeitung on the verdict

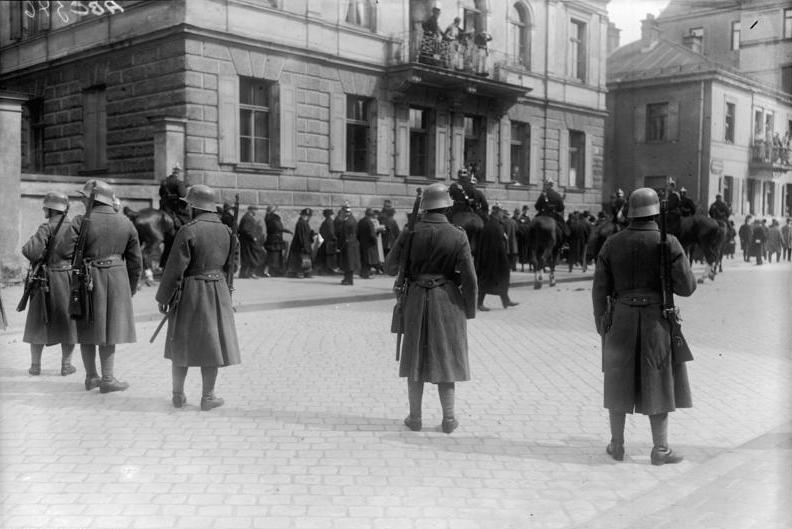
Security measures before the verdict announcement

On 1 April 1924, the verdict was to be announced. At ten o'clock, the defendants arrived at the Infantry School and first posed for photographers. The officers wore splendid uniforms; Ludendorff and Kriebel even wore Pickelhaubes.

In the overcrowded hall, Neithardt read the verdict, decided by a vote of four to one. The reasoning cited the defendants' "purely patriotic spirit and noblest will". The deaths of the four Bavarian policemen during the putsch were not mentioned. Except for Ludendorff, all defendants were found guilty, though Brückner, Röhm, Pernet, Wagner, and Frick were convicted only of aiding and abetting high treason.

Ludendorff protested his acquittal, declaring:

I consider this acquittal a disgrace for the uniform and the decorations I wear, in the eyes of my comrades.

—

This statement triggered stormy cheers of "Heil!". Pre-trial detention was deducted from the sentences, so Frick, Röhm, Wagner, and Brückner were released on probation. Hitler, Weber, Kriebel, and Pöhner were sentenced to the minimum penalty of five years' Festungshaft (fortress detention) plus a fine of 200 gold marks. After six months, the sentence could be converted to probation for good behavior. The mandatory expulsion of Hitler under § 9 para. 2 of the Law for the Protection of the Republic was not applied, citing that Hitler considered himself German, had served four and a half years in the German Army during the war, and had distinguished himself through bravery.

In the courtroom, cries of "Bravo!" and "Heil!" rang out. The prisoners received bouquets of flowers. When they appeared at the window of the guardroom before their transport to Landsberg, the crowd on Blutenburg Street broke into cheers.

On 20 December 1924, Hitler and Kriebel were released from Landsberg on probation; Pöhner and Weber, who began their imprisonment later, were released in the spring of 1925.

=== The subordinate proceedings ===
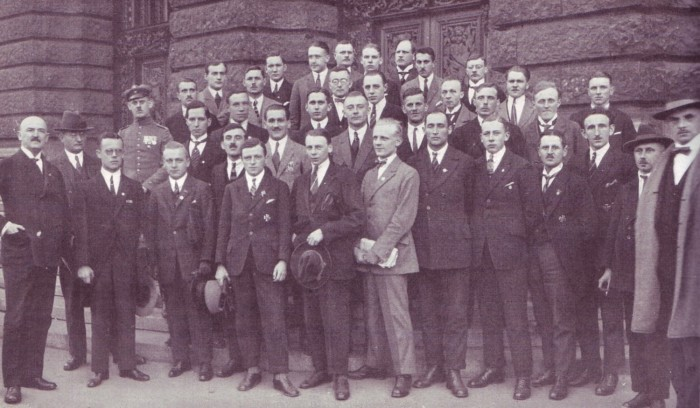
The defendants in the "Little Hitler Trial": Among others, Karl Fiehler, Erhard Heiden, Walter Hewel, Hans Kallenbach, Hansjörg Maurer, Emil Maurice, and Alois Rosenwink.

Following the trial against Hitler, Ludendorff, and the other ringleaders, further criminal proceedings related to the failed coup were held before the Munich People's Court in April and May 1924.

In the first half of April, a trial for "aiding and abetting high treason" was held against Karl Osswald, Gerhard von Prosch, and Edmund Heines. It ended on 16 April 1924 with guilty verdicts; each defendant received the minimum sentence of fifteen months' imprisonment. Osswald, as deputy leader of the Reichskriegsflagge paramilitary group, had participated in occupying the Munich Military District Command. Prosch, a police officer, had tried to win other police officers to the putschists' side. Heines, as leader of an SA hundred, had occupied the Infantry School and then the Isar Bridge on the morning of 9 November to seal off the city centre.

Next was a mass trial against 40 members of the Hitler Assault Squad ("Proceedings against Josef Berchtold and 39 Comrades"). (Note: The forty defendants were (L = imprisoned in Landsberg; A = acquitted; F = fled): Joseph Berchtold (F), Wilhelm Briemann, Emil Danneberg (L), Josef Feichtmayr (L), Otto Feichtmayr (L), Karl Fiehler (L), Werner Fiehler (F), Berthold Fischer (L), Hermann Fobke (L), Franz Fröschl (L), Wilhelm Fuchs, Friedrich Geißelbrecht (L), Josef Gerum (L), Emil Hamm (L), Karl Hauenstein, Johann Haug (L), Erhard Heiden (F), Walter Hewel (L), Paul Hirschberg, Gerhard Friedrich Hoff, Karl Hutter (L), Hans Kallenbach (L), Heinrich von Knobloch, Wilhelm Knörlein, Hans Eduard Krüger, Wilhelm Laforce (L), Konrad Linder (F), Johann Mahr, Hansjörg Maurer, Emil Maurice (L), Otto Wolfgang Reichart (L), Alois Rosenwink (L), Julius Schaub (L), Ludwig Schmied, Edmund Schneider (L), Johann Schön, Michael Steinbinder, Adalbert Stollwerk, Heinrich Strauss, and Johann Wegelin.) These men were the executive agents of the coup attempt. On 23 April 1924, 38 of the accused were found guilty of "aiding and abetting high treason" and sentenced to minor prison terms averaging fifteen months, with the prospect of probation after serving a few months. The two remaining defendants were acquitted.

Sixteen of the thirty-eight convicted assault squad members evaded punishment by fleeing. The remaining twenty-two, joined in May by the convicted Hess, were imprisoned in Landsberg Fortress, forming a prisoner community with Hitler, Kriebel, and Weber. After Hitler's release in December 1924, his fellow putschists were also released during 1925. Many rejoined the re-legalized NSDAP.

==== Photos of putschists ====
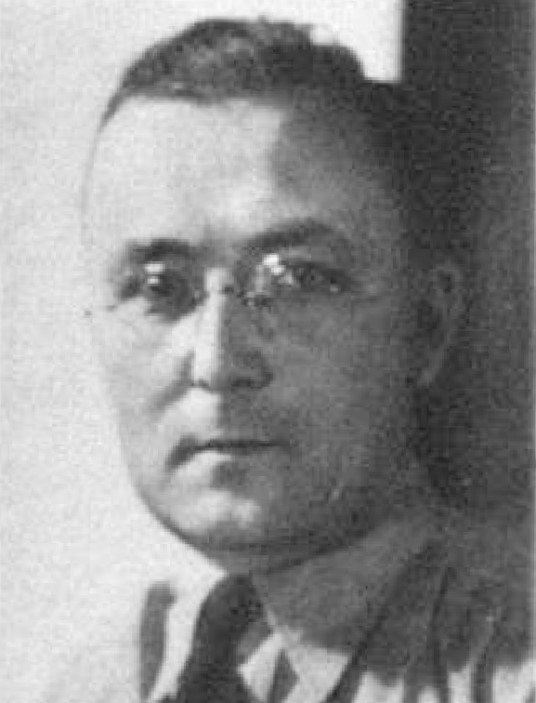
Friedrich Geißelbrecht

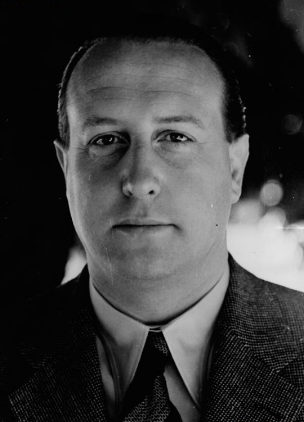
Walter Hewel (1940)

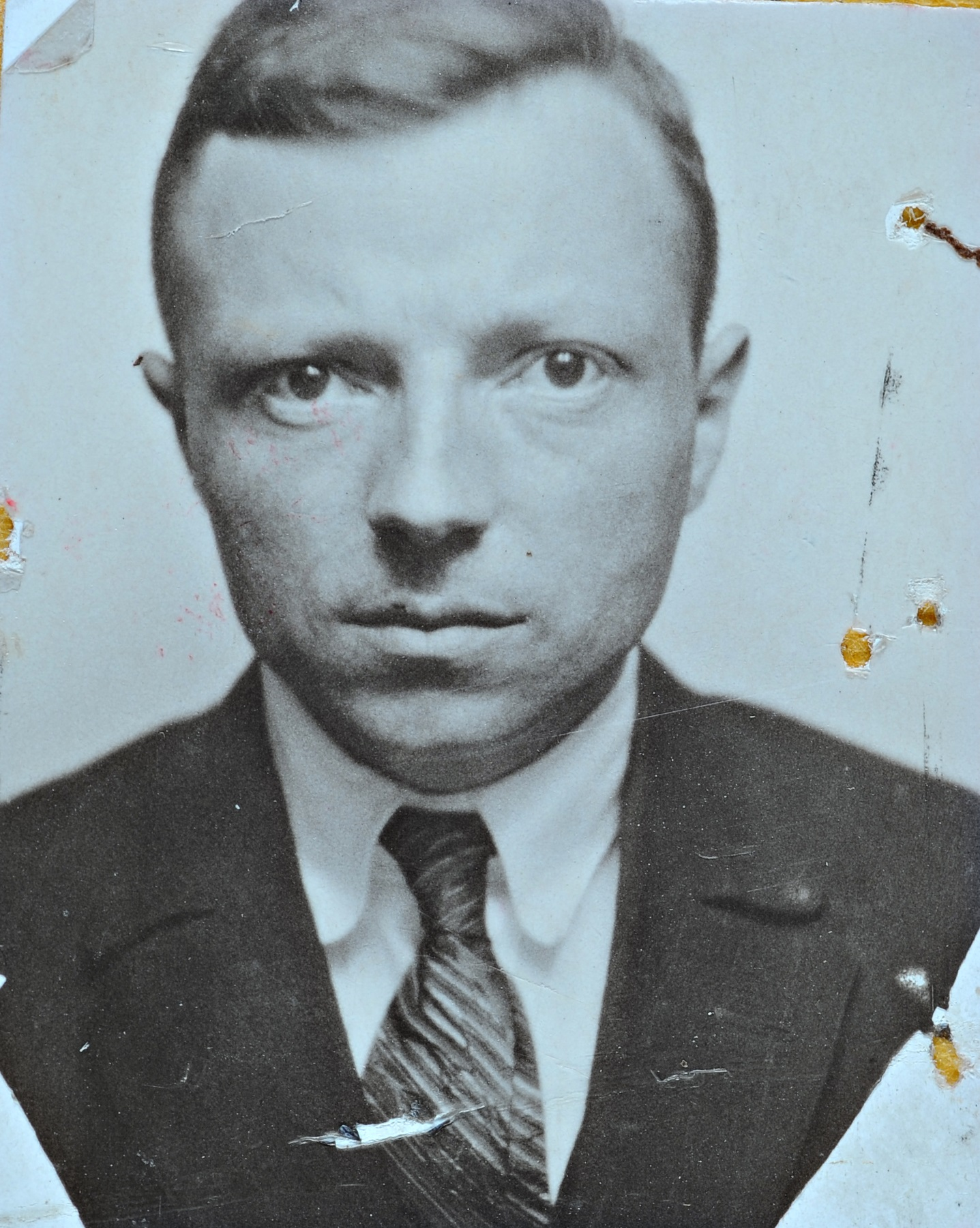
Hans Kallenbach

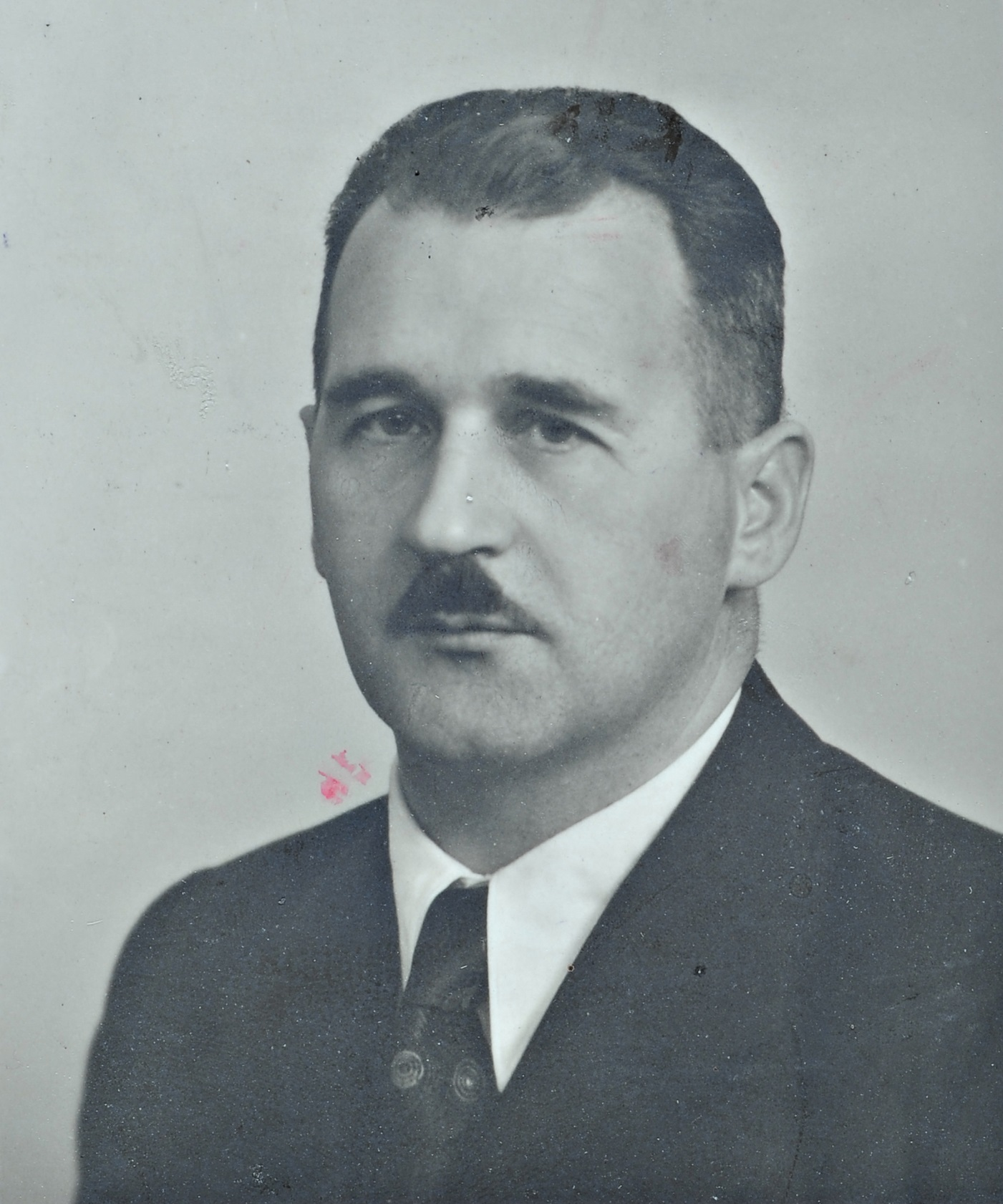
Alois Rosenwink

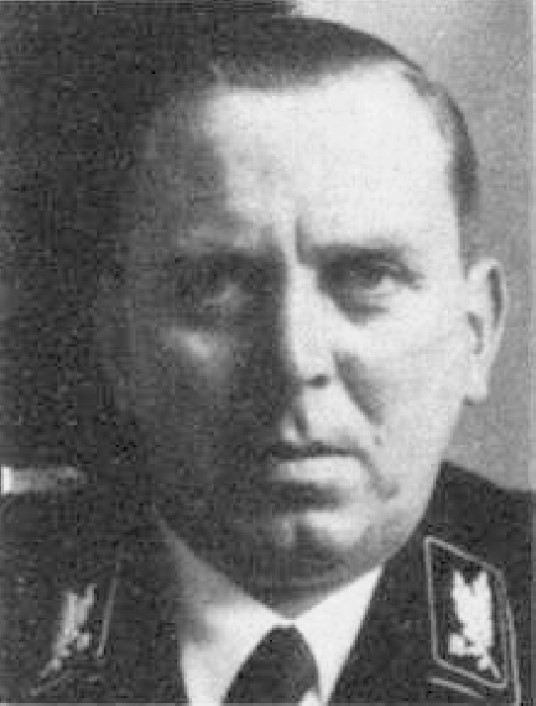
Julius Schaub

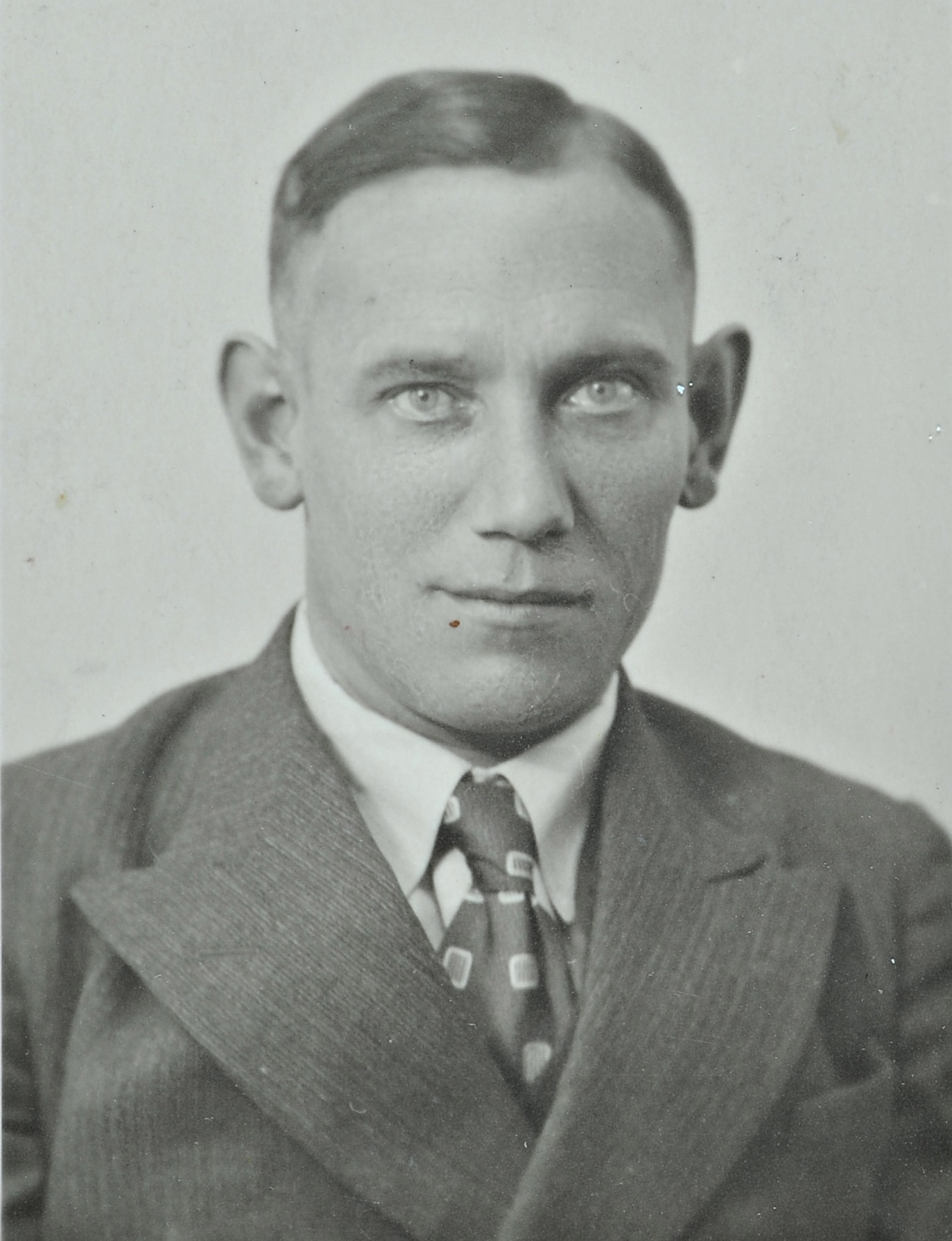
Ludwig Schmied

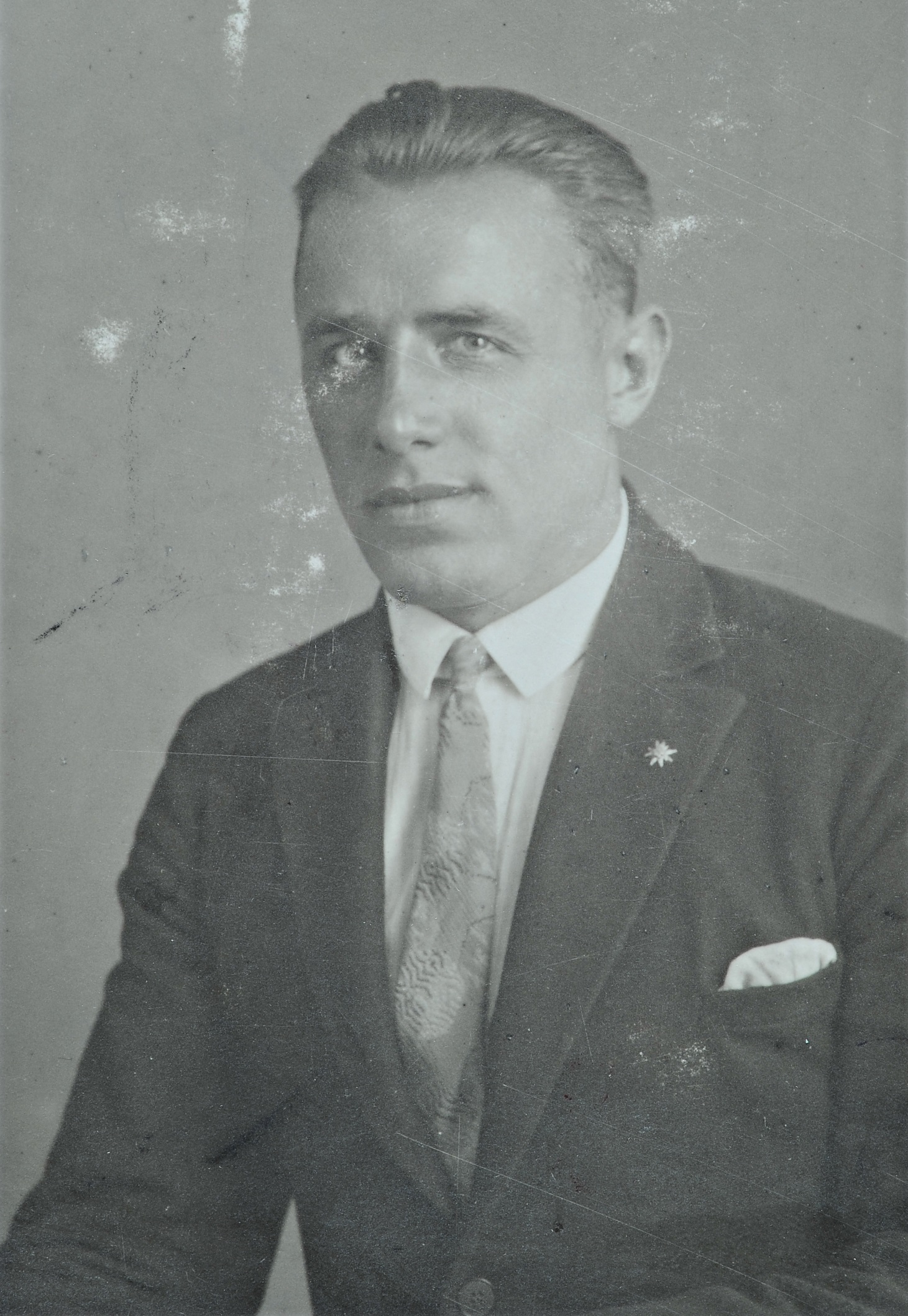
Edmund Schneider

== The parliamentary committee of inquiry ==
On the initiative of Wilhelm Hoegner (SPD) and a motion by the SPD parliamentary group on 3 June 1924, the Bavarian Landtag on 31 July 1924 appointed a committee of inquiry to "investigate the events of 1 May 1923 in Munich and the endeavours directed against the Reich and state constitution in Bavaria from 26 September to 9 November 1923". The committee only began its work on 5 October 1927.

Members were Georg Stang (BVP, chairman), Count Joseph von Pestalozza (BVP), Wilhelm Hoegner (SPD), Fritz Schäffer (BVP), Johann Michael Hilpert (DNVP), Anton Staedele (Bavarian Farmers' and Middle Class Union), and Theodor Doerfler (Völkischer Block).

The main focus, however, was not the putsch or the trial, but whether Justice Minister Franz Gürtner had actively prevented a criminal investigation into the events of 1 May 1923 (when Hitler allegedly planned an earlier coup) and thus violated the constitution.

On 27 April 1928, the committee presented a brief and restrained final report. The SPD's dissenting opinion, presented by Hoegner, accused the Bavarian judiciary of failure in dealing with the NSDAP. It also stated that Hitler's and Ludendorff's plans had long been known to General State Commissioner von Kahr, who had failed to act.

Excerpts from the committee's work (copies of court files made by Hoegner) were published by the SPD state committee as Hitler und Kahr. Die bayerischen Napoleonsgrößen von 1923 (Hitler and Kahr: The Bavarian Napoleonic Figures of 1923). Since the trial files were removed from registries after 1933 and separately stored, then deliberately burned in April 1945, this publication, along with the stenographic trial transcripts, is now a key source.

== Later assessments ==
After World War II, the trial was sometimes portrayed as an appropriate response to an action not to be taken seriously. Walter von Cube wrote in 1963:

The Hitler trial, the Landsberg fortress detention, the breakup of the NSDAP: for Bavaria, the case was closed. The brazen desperadoes who wanted to make politics in puttees and peaked caps, with Mauser pistols and machine guns, seemed definitively defeated.

—

Bernt Engelmann criticized in 1975, especially the regular exclusion of the public when the SA's relations with the Reichswehr or Hitler's with Kahr were discussed, and noted that the transcripts were still kept secret. Otto Gritschneder, who in 2000 helped publish the entire trial record and later gained access to the presiding judge's personnel and denazification files, analyzed the actions of Judge Neithardt in his 2001 book Der Hitler-Prozeß und sein Richter Georg Neithardt: Eine Rechtsbeugung von 1924 mit Folgen, arguing that Neithardt's conduct had paved the way for Hitler to gain power.

== Film adaptations ==
In 1971, ZDF broadcast a television play titled Der Hitler-Ludendorff Prozeß, directed by Paul Verhoeven. Hitler was the only major figure not portrayed by an actor; a moderator recited some of his trial statements and provided background explanations.

On the 85th anniversary of the verdict, BR-alpha aired a dramatization titled Hitler vor Gericht on 27 March 2009. For the first time on German television, a selection of the 24 trial days was enacted by actors using exclusively historical transcripts. Johannes Zirner played Hitler, and Dieter Fischer played his defense attorney Lorenz Roder. The screenplay was by director Bernd Fischerauer and Klaus Gietinger.

The trial is also depicted in the biographical miniseries Hitler: The Rise of Evil.

== Archival records ==
The files of the police and prosecutorial investigations into the events of 8–9 November 1923 and the subsequent 1924 trials are held at the Bavarian State Archives Munich. Digitized files from the Munich Police Directorate are available online, including files on the putsch (PDM 6709–6711), the court proceedings (PDM 6712–6717), and the parliamentary committee of inquiry (PDM 6718–6720).

The digitized files can be accessed via the following links:

- Bavarian State Archives: Munich Police Directorate No. 6709: Hitler Putsch 1923 (298 digitized items)
- Bavarian State Archives: Munich Police Directorate No. 6710: Hitler Putsch 1923 (297 digitized items)
- Bavarian State Archives: Munich Police Directorate No. 6711 Hitler Putsch 1923 (Posters, Notices, Leaflets) (175 digitized items)
- Munich State Archive: Munich Police Directorate No. 6712: Hitler Putsch 1923 (Interrogations of Witnesses and Detainees) (267 digitized items) This includes in particular a digitized version of the judgment of the Munich I People's Court against Josef Berchtold and 39 comrades for accessory to high treason dated April 23, 1924 (images 254 to 266)
- Bavarian State Archives: Munich Police Directorate No. 6713: Hitler Putsch 1923 (Interrogations of Witnesses and Detainees) (414 digitized items)
- Bavarian State Archives: Munich Police Directorate No. 6714: Trial against Hitler and Ludendorff 1924 (98 digitized items)
- Bavarian State Archives: Munich Police Directorate No. 6715: Hitler Putsch 1923 (405 digitized items)
- Bavarian State Archives: Munich Police Directorate No. 6716: Trial against Adolf Hitler (240 digitized items)
- Bavarian State Archives: Munich Police Directorate No. 6717: Trial against Adolf Hitler (453 digitized items)
- No. 6718 Parliamentary Committee of Inquiry for the Investigation of the Events of May 1, 1923 and the Occurrences from September to November 1923 (132 digitized items)
- Bavarian State Archives: Munich Police Directorate No. 6719: Investigative Committee of the Bavarian State Parliament concerning the Political Events in 1923 (135 digitized items)
- Bavarian State Archives: Munich Police Directorate No. 6720: Consequences of the Hitler Putsch (Committee of Inquiry) (22 digitized items)

== See also ==
- Nuremberg trials
- Landsberg Prison
- Georg Neithardt
- Hans Ehard
