= Hermann Kriebel =

German military officer and Nazi politician (1876–1941)

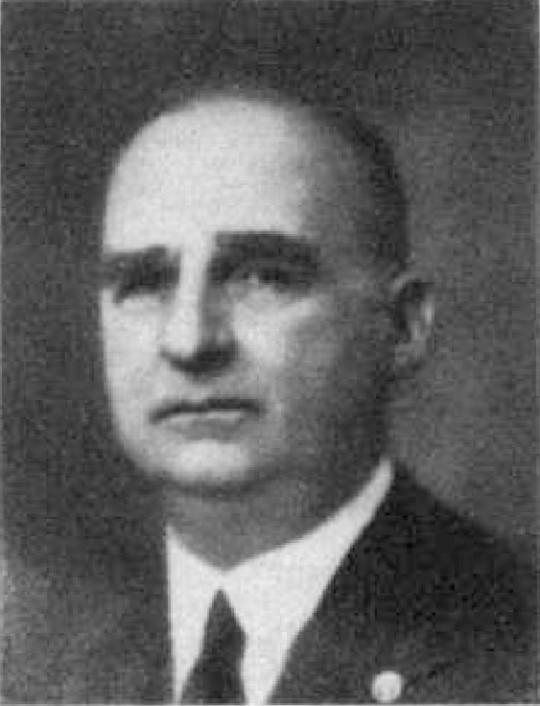
- Kriebel (1938)

Chief, Personnel Department Reich Ministry of Foreign Affairs
- In office 20 April 1939 – 16 February 1941

German Consul General in Shanghai
- In office 21 April 1934 – 17 October 1937

Military Commander Kampfbund
- In office 2 September 1923 – 10 November 1923

Additional positions
- 1924: Reichstag Deputy
- 1938–1941: Reichstag Deputy

Personal details
- Born: 20 January 1876 Germersheim, Kingdom of Bavaria, German Empire
- Died: 16 February 1941 (aged 65) Munich, Nazi Germany
- Resting place: Aschau im Chiemgau
- Party: Nazi Party
- Profession: Military officer Diplomat
- Awards: Golden Party Badge

Military service
- Allegiance: German Empire
- Branch/service: Royal Bavarian Army; Freikorps
- Years of service: 1896–1920
- Rank: Oberstleutnant
- Unit: 1st Infantry Regiment; 22nd Infantry Regiment
- Battles/wars: First World War

Hermann Karl Theodor Kriebel (20 January 1876 – 16 February 1941) was a German professional military officer in the Royal Bavarian Army who served in the First World War. He became an early follower of Adolf Hitler, led the paramilitary forces of the Kampfbund, participated in the failed Beer Hall Putsch and was jailed along with Hitler. After the Nazi seizure of power, he became the German consul general in Shanghai and was involved in arms dealing to the Kuomintang regime. He returned to Germany in 1937, but was unable to secure a major role in the Nazi regime. He was also an SA-Obergruppenführer in the Sturmabteilung.

== Early life and military career ==
Kriebel was born in Germersheim in the Rhenish Palatinate, the son of Bavarian Generalmajor Karl Kriebel (1834–1895). He was educated at elementary schools in Neu-Ulm and Munich, the Royal Maximilian Gymnasium in Munich and the Lyceum in Metz. He decided to pursue a military career in the Royal Bavarian Army, joined the 1st Infantry Regiment as a Fähnrich (ensign) in 1894 and was commissioned a Leutnant in 1896. Between 1900 and 1901, he was transferred to the Imperial German Marine Battalion and served with the expeditionary force in China during the Boxer Rebellion. Returning to Germany, he attended the Bavarian War Academy from 1904 to 1907. From 1908 to 1910 he served in the Bavarian General Staff. Promoted to Hauptmann, he was posted to the Great General Staff from 1910 to 1912 and, from 1912 to 1914, he was a company commander with the 22nd Bavarian Infantry Regiment.

On the outbreak of the First World War in August 1914, Kriebel went into action with his unit on the western front. Advancing to Major in 1915, he was first general staff officer in the 8th Bavarian Reserve Division. From 1916 to 1917, he was on the staff of the XV Royal Bavarian Reserve Corps. From 1916 to 1917, he was on the staff of Quartermaster General Erich Ludendorff, and he became a department head from November 1917 to February 1918. He served in the Supreme Army Command until the end of the war and was a representative of the Quartermaster General and the Bavarian Government on the Armistice Commission until July 1919. As a member of the German armistice delegation, his parting words to the French delegation were: "See you again in 20 years". He fought with the Freikorps during the German Revolution of 1918–1919 and retired from military service in 1920 with the rank of Oberstleutnant.

Kriebel continued to be involved with paramilitary units until 1922, serving in the Escherich Organization established by Georg Escherich and as chief of staff of the Bavarian Citizens' Defense Force. As a key administrator, he took charge of personnel, press affairs, correspondence, contracts, intelligence, political affairs and liaison with both the Reichswehr and the Interior Ministry. While in this role, he advocated that the unit support the failed Kapp Putsch of March 1920 that sought the overthrow of the Weimar Republic.

== Involvement with Nazism ==
On 2 September 1923, Kriebel became the military leader of the Kampfbund, the league of militant nationalist societies that included Adolf Hitler's Sturmabteilung (SA), Friedrich Weber's Oberland League and Ernst Röhm's Reichskriegflagge. Kriebel was, with Hitler and Ludendorff, a key figure in the failed Beer Hall Putsch of 8–9 November 1923 and marched with them in the front row to the Feldherrnhalle. After the collapse of the coup, he briefly fled to Austria but returned to Munich and was arrested on 11 November. He stood trial with Hitler, was convicted of high treason on 1 April 1924, and was sentenced to 5 years of Festungshaft (fortress confinement) with the possibility of parole in 6 months, a fine of 200 gold marks and payment of court costs. He served his sentence with Hitler at Landsberg Prison.

At the parliamentary election of May 1924, Kriebel was elected as a Reichstag deputy on the electoral list of the National Socialist Freedom Party, a front organization of the Nazi Party. Due to his confinement, he never sat as a deputy before the Reichstag was dissolved on 20 October. On 20 December 1924, Kriebel was released on parole along with Hitler.

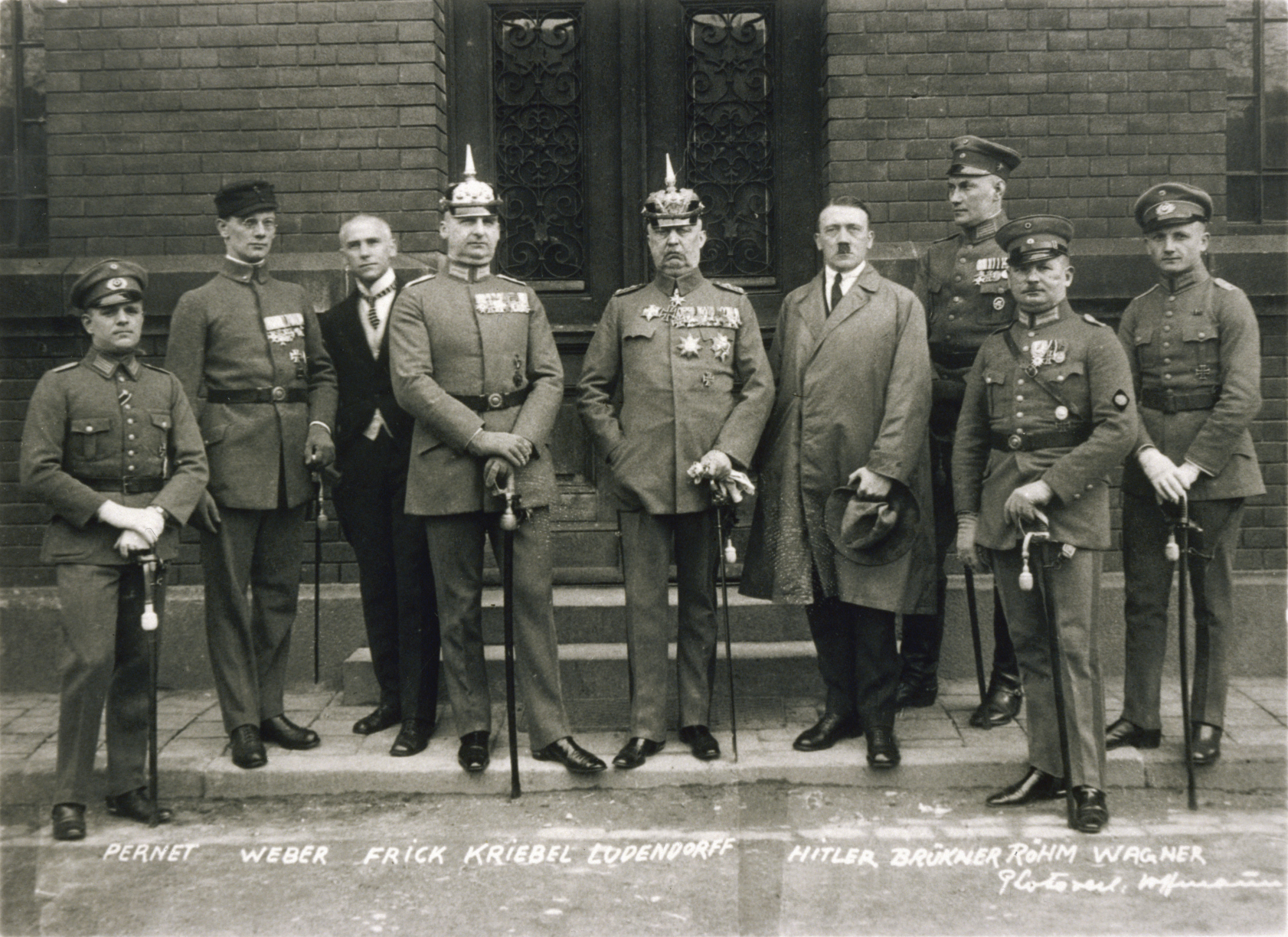
Defendants in the Beer Hall Putsch trial, 1 April 1924. From left to right: Heinz Pernet, Friedrich Weber, Wilhelm Frick, Kriebel, Ludendorff, Hitler, Wilhelm Brückner, Ernst Röhm, and Robert Heinrich Wagner

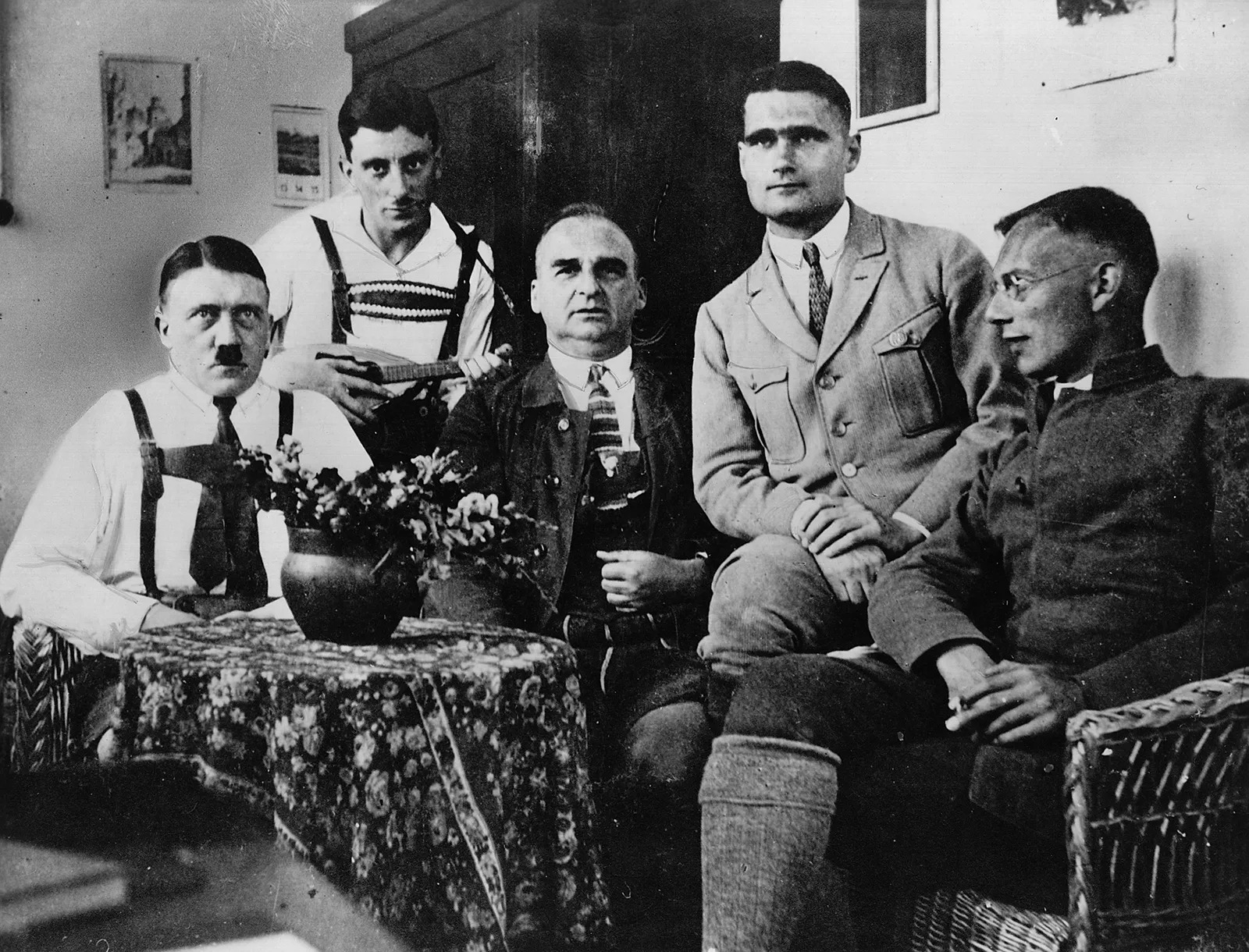
Hitler, Emil Maurice, Kriebel, Rudolf Hess, and Friedrich Weber at Landsberg Prison

After his release from prison, he maintained his ties with the Nazi Party and the Oberland League. From 1924 to 1929, he was engaged as an estate manager in Carinthia and, from 1926, he was active in the Heimwehr, an Austrian paramilitary group.

== Activities in China ==
In 1929, Kriebel arrived in China as part of a German delegation to work as an arms dealer and an adviser to the Kuomintang government of Chiang Kai-shek. Besides fighting the Chinese Communists, the Kuomintang regime was at the time fighting the armies of Chinese warlords, namely General Feng Yuxiang in the north and the Guangxi clique of General Bai Chongxi and Li Zongren in the south. Accordingly, as China had hardly any arms manufacturing factories of its own at the time, arms had to be imported. Kriebel found that the demand for arms in China was enormous, making the work of an arms dealer very profitable. In May 1929, he succeeded the chief military and economic advisor Max Bauer upon his untimely death from smallpox but he lacked Bauer's diplomatic skill, and the Chinese expressed their disenchantment and asked for a replacement. Kriebel was succeeded in May 1930 by Georg Wetzell but stayed on in China as one of the several German military advisors and instructors.

Kriebel joined the Nazi Party on 1 January 1930 (membership number 344,967). However, in December 1933, his membership was backdated to 1 October 1928 (membership number 82,996), which gave him the added status of an Alter Kämpfer or "old fighter". After the Nazi seizure of power in 1933, Kriebel returned to Germany and served as the SA liaison officer to the Foreign Office. A long-serving officer in the SA, he was promoted to SA-Gruppenführer on 27 May 1933 and SA-Obergruppenführer on 9 November 1937.

In April 1934, he returned to China when he was named the German Consul General in Shanghai. Kriebel's pro-Chinese assessments of the political and military situation in China was not held in very high regard by either the German Foreign Office or by the Propaganda Ministry, especially when he openly spoke out against their pro-Japanese stance in his reports. He consequently grew increasingly disillusioned and withdrawn. On 17 October 1937, he was granted leave from his post and returned to Germany.

== Final years ==
At the 10 April 1938 parliamentary election to the Reichstag, Kriebel was elected as a deputy representing electoral constituency 2 (Berlin-West). After more than a year without a diplomatic post, he was assigned to the Foreign Office on 10 January 1939. He held out hope for an ambassadorial posting, but he had fallen out of favor. He was never given a politically influential diplomatic post but instead was appointed as a Ministerialdirektor and head of the Foreign Office personnel department on 20 April 1939, a position he held until his death. In September 1940, Hitler promoted him to Oberst in the German Army and, for his 65th birthday in January 1941, awarded him the honor title of ambassador. Barely four weeks later, Kriebel died after a short illness. He was honored on 20 February with a state funeral before the Feldherrnhalle in Munich attended by Hitler, Rudolf Hess, Hermann Göring, Foreign Minister Joachim von Ribbentrop and many other Nazi dignitaries. He was buried in Aschau im Chiemgau.

== See also ==
- China–Germany relations (1912–1949)

== Sources ==
- Bullock, Alan (1962). Hitler: A Study in Tyranny. New York: Harper Torchbooks. ISBN 978-0-060-92020-3.
- Fenby, Jonathan (2004). Chiang Kai Shek: China's Generalissimo and the Nation He Lost. New York: Carroll & Graf. ISBN 0786714840.
- Jablonsky, David (1989). The Nazi Party in Dissolution. Frank Cass and Company, Ltd. ISBN 0-71463-322-4.
- Klee, Ernst (2007). Das Personenlexikon zum Dritten Reich. Wer war was vor und nach 1945. Frankfurt-am-Main: Fischer-Taschenbuch-Verlag. ISBN 978-3-596-16048-8.
