= Festungshaft =

Former type of custodial sentence

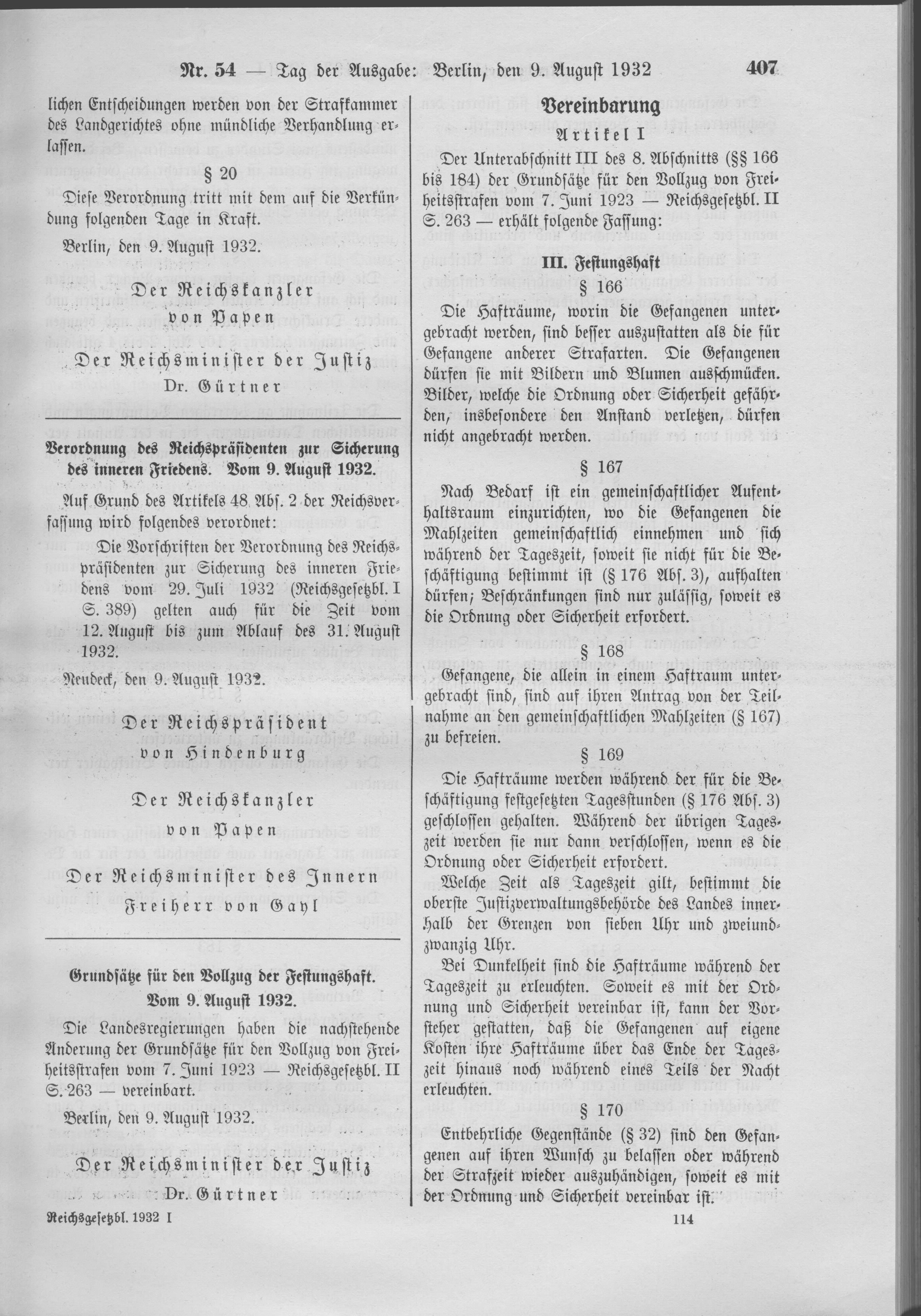
The 1932 rules for Festungshaft (in RGBl. 1932 I p. 407)

Festungshaft (English: fortress confinement; Latin: custodia honesta, lit. 'honorable custody') was a privileged custodial sentence in Germany from the 16th century until 1970. It also existed in some neighbouring territories and states.

Fortress confinement was a sentence which was generally seen as not conferring dishonour; it granted the sentenced person wide-ranging liberties, and carried no obligation to penal labour.

Notable prisoners in fortress confinement include August Bebel, Adolf Hitler, Karl Liebknecht and Werner von Siemens.

== History ==
=== Early history ===
The concept of Festungshaft began to develop during the 16th century in German military and criminal justice. It was based on the idea of the ius commune that the punishment of an offender should differ based on their standing in the social hierarchy, the reasoning being that conferring the same sentence would be harsher on a noble person than on a commoner. The precise origin of the Festungshaft concept is, however, not known. The German legal scholar Thomas Krause reasons that a military connection seems likely, because many prisoners in fortress confinement were military officers.

As a separate type of custodial sentence, it was only known in some territories of the Holy Roman Empire (e.g., in the Kingdom of Prussia and the Electorate of Saxony), while in other territories only the monarch could impose this privileged type of sentence.

=== German Empire ===
With the end of the formal privileges of nobility in criminal justice, fortress confinement was no longer a sentence for the nobility and other persons of high social rank in the German Empire (1871–1918), but was mainly used as a sentence for participating in duels and crimes of a political nature, which were both not seen as generally dishonourable. For duels, fortress confinement was the only type of custodial sentence possible (sections 201–210 of the Reichsstrafgesetzbuch [Reich Criminal Code]). In 1913, for example, 155 persons were sentenced to fortress imprisonment; of those, 154 were sentenced for participating in a duel while one offender was sentenced for a political crime. In 1924 – after the conclusion of World War I – 362 persons were sentenced to fortress confinement; of those, 51 received the sentence for partaking in a duel, while the rest were sentenced for crimes with a political element.

The Reichsstrafgesetzbuch of 1871, the criminal code of the German Empire, laid down the basic rules for fortress confinement in its section 17:

Die Festungshaft ist eine lebenslängliche oder eine zeitige. Der Höchstbetrag der zeitigen Festungshaft ist funfzehn Jahre, ihr Mindestbetrag ein Tag. Wo das Gesetz die Festungshaft nicht ausdrücklich als eine lebenslängliche androht, ist dieselbe eine zeitige. Die Strafe der Festungshaft besteht in Freiheitsentziehung mit Beaufsichtigung der Beschäftigung und Lebensweise der Gefangenen; sie wird in Festungen oder in anderen dazu bestimmten Räumen vollzogen.

Fortress imprisonment is either lifelong or temporary. The maximum term of temporary fortress imprisonment is fifteen years, the minimum term is one day. Where the law does not expressly threaten fortress imprisonment as lifelong, it is temporary. The punishment of fortress imprisonment consists in deprivation of liberty with supervision of the prisoners' occupation and way of life; it is carried out in fortresses or in other premises designated for this purpose.

— Section 17 of the Reichsstrafgesetzbuch

Under the Reichsstrafgesetzbuch, Festungshaft was in practice (Note: De jure the Haft (custody) was the most lenient type of custodial sentences.) the most lenient type of a custodial sentence, the others being – in order of decreasing harshness – Zuchthausstrafe (correctional sentence), Gefängnißstrafe (prison sentence) and Haft (custody). If Festungshaft was the custodial sentence, the sentenced person could not lose their civilian rights of honour.

The more granular rules for fortress confinement were contained in sections 166–184 of the Grundsätze über den Vollzug von Freiheitsstrafen (Principles on the Execution of Prison Sentences) of 7 June 1923. Under these liberal rules, enacted during the time of the Weimar Republic (1918–1933), some German territories (e.g., Prussia, Saxony, and Hamburg) allowed their prisoners in fortress confinement to freely visit the city and persons outside the prison without supervision. Other privileges included that the prisoners were not searched when they began their sentence, that they could drink beer and wine, and that they could receive visitors in their prison cells. The prisoners did not have to wear prison uniforms in fortress confinement.

The liberal rules of 1923 were revised in 1932, when the new Grundsätze für den Vollzug der Festungshaft (Principles on the Execution of Fortress Confinement) of 9 August 1932 were promulgated in the Reichsgesetzblatt (Reich Law Gazette). These rules cut back on some of the liberties prisoners in fortress confinement enjoyed.

=== Federal Republic of Germany ===
After the end of World War II, fortress confinement was renamed to Einschließung (confinement) in October 1953, and abolished altogether in April 1970.

== Notable prisoners in fortress confinement ==
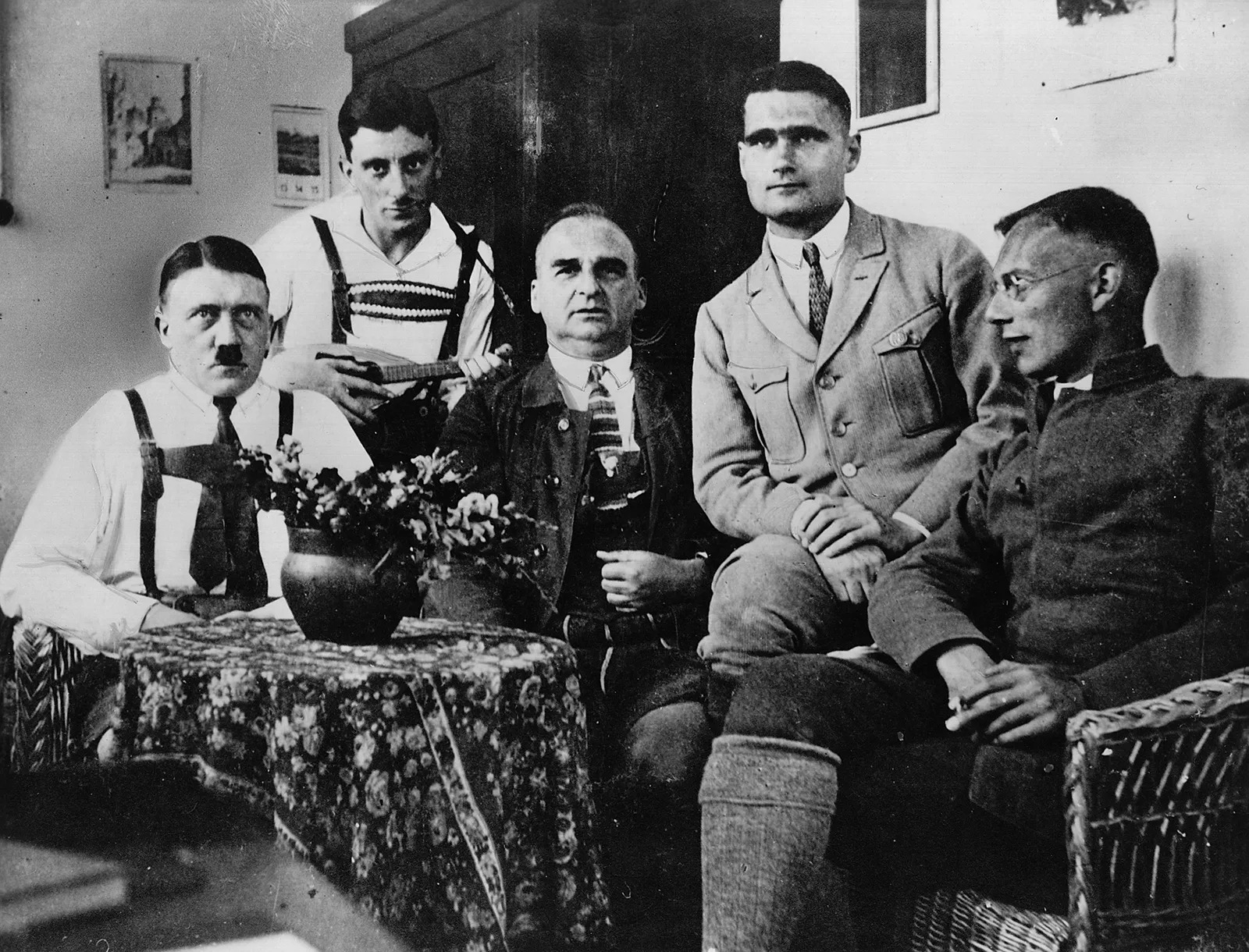
Adolf Hitler, Emil Maurice, Hermann Kriebel, Rudolf Hess, and Friedrich Weber at Landsberg Prison

The most notable prisoner in fortress confinement was probably Nazi Party leader Adolf Hitler, the later dictator of Nazi Germany. After his failed coup d'état, the 1923 Beer Hall Putsch, he was sentenced for high treason to five years in fortress confinement. The proceedings before the People's Court of Bavaria (Bayrisches Volksgericht) were presided over by Georg Neithardt, who had far-right views and sympathies for the putschists.

Hitler started his sentence in Landsberg Prison on 1 April 1924, and was released early – in under nine months – on 20 December 1924. His confidant Ernst Hanfstaengl described the life of the prisoner in lavish terms: "[I] walked into a delicatessen. There was fruit and there were flowers, wine and other alcoholic beverages, ham, sausage, cake, boxes of chocolates and much more." Hitler received more than 300 visitors while in fortress confinement. He wrote the first part of Mein Kampf ('My Struggle') while imprisoned in Landsberg.

Other notable prisoners in fortress confinement include:

- Anton Graf von Arco auf Valley (fortress confinement in Landsberg Prison for the murder of Kurt Eisner)
- August Bebel (fortress confinement in Hubertusburg for high treason and lèse-majesté Leipzig high treason proceedings)
- Karl Liebknecht (fortress confinement in Hubertusburg for high treason Leipzig high treason proceedings)
- Erich Mühsam (fortress confinement for his participation in the Bavarian Council Republic)
- Werner von Siemens (fortress confinement in Magdeburg Citadel for being a second in a duel)
- Frank Wedekind (fortress confinement in Königstein Fortress for lèse-majesté)
