= Friedrich Weber (veterinarian) =

German Nazi veterinary official (1892–1955)

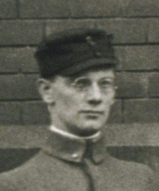
- Weber in 1924

Leader, Reich Veterinary Chamber
- In office 11 July 1936 – 8 May 1945
- Preceded by: Position created
- Succeeded by: Position abolished

Reich Veterinarian Leader
- In office 15 February 1934 – 8 May 1945
- Preceded by: Position created
- Succeeded by: Position abolished

Bundesführer, Bund Oberland
- In office 23 October 1922 – 7 November 1929
- Preceded by: Position created

Personal details
- Born: 30 January 1892 Frankfurt am Main, Kingdom of Prussia. German Empire
- Died: 14 July 1955 (aged 63) Munich, Bavaria, West Germany
- Party: Nazi Party
- Relatives: Julius Friedrich Lehmann (father-in-law)
- Profession: Veterinarian
- Known for: Participant in the Beer Hall Putsch
- Civilian awards: Blood Order; Golden Party Badge

Military service
- Allegiance: German Empire
- Branch/service: Royal Bavarian Army; Freikorps
- Years of service: 1914–1918; 1919–1921
- Unit: 1st Heavy Cavalry Regiment; Freikorps Epp; Freikorps Oberland
- Battles/wars: World War I Munich Soviet Republic; Ruhr Uprising; Third Silesian Uprising
- Military awards: Iron Cross, 2nd class Military Merit Cross (Bavaria), 1st class

Friedrich Weber (30 January 1892 – 19 July 1955) was a German veterinarian. In the First World War, he served in the Royal Bavarian Army, and later was a member of a Freikorps unit. In October 1922, under the Weimar Republic, he became the leader of the Bund Oberland (Highlands League), a paramilitary unit opposed to the republic, and participated in Adolf Hitler's failed Beer Hall Putsch in November 1923. Along with Hitler, he was convicted of treason in 1924 and, after his release from prison, continued to head the re-established Bund Oberland until November 1929.

During Nazi Germany, Weber was appointed to the posts of Reichstierärzteführer (Reich Veterinarian Leader) and head of the Reich Veterinarians Chamber. He was a ministerial director in the Reich Ministry of the Interior and held an academic teaching post at the Humboldt University of Berlin. Weber also served in the Nazi paramilitary Schutzstaffel (SS) from 1933 to 1945 and rose to the rank of SS-Gruppenführer. In denazification proceedings after the end of the Second World War, he was first adjudged to be a "major offender" but, on appeal, had his classification lowered to that of a "follower".

== Early life and war service ==
Weber was born in Frankfurt am Main and earned his Abitur from the local Gymnasium. He was a member of the Wandervogel movement from 1909, leading its Bavarian regional branch in 1913. He enrolled at the veterinary college of the Ludwig-Maximilians-Universität München (LMU) in 1911. On the outbreak of the First World War in August 1914, he paused his studies to join the 1st Heavy Cavalry Regiment of the Royal Bavarian Army in Munich, and served as an auxiliary field veterinarian. In 1915, he took part in combat operations in the Tyrol and in the campaign against Serbia. From 1916 until September 1917, he served on the eastern front against Russia with Jäger Brigade 2. He then was engaged against Italy with Jäger Regiment 4 and, in 1918, he fought in France until his discharge on 23 December 1918. He was awarded the Iron Cross, 2nd class and the Bavarian Military Merit Cross, 1st class. After the end of the war, he returned to civilian life and completed his studies in 1919. He also led the Bavarian branch of the Jungdeutscher Bund (Young German League), a conservative nationalist alumni association of the Wandervogel.

== Freikorps and Bund Oberland involvement ==
In 1919, Weber joined the Freikorps Epp under the command of Franz Ritter von Epp, and participated in the overthrow of the Bavarian Soviet Republic in April and May of that year. In 1920, he received his license to practice veterinary medicine. In March and April 1920, Weber participated as a squad leader in the suppression of Ruhr uprising, serving with the Zeitfreiwilligen-Korps Godin (Godin Volunteer Corps). On 1 October 1920, he became an assistant at the Institute for Animal Physiology within the Faculty of Veterinary Medicine at LMU. During his tenure there, he earned his doctorate in 1922 upon completion of his dissertation titled Über eine Methode zur Bestimmung des Extraktstickstoffes (On a Method for Determining Extract Nitrogen). He was the recipient of a grant from the Rockefeller Foundation.

Weber joined the Freikorps Oberland in early 1921, in which he advanced from squad leader to platoon leader and company commander during the Third Silesian Uprising in Upper Silesia. After the Freikorps was dissolved, some former members reconstituted it as the Bund Oberland in October 1921. On 23 October 1922, the Munich Regional Court appointed Weber as Bundesführer (League Leader), and he was subsequently confirmed in the position by the membership at a general meeting on 2 December 1922.

=== Beer Hall Putsch participation and incarceration ===
On 2 September 1923, Weber led the Bund Oberland into an alliance with the Sturmabteilung (SA) and the Bund Reichskriegsflagge to form the Deutscher Kampfbund (German Combat League). This alliance provided the personnel base for the Beer Hall Putsch of 8–9 November 1923, in which Weber assumed a leadership role in the march on the Feldherrnhalle along with Adolf Hitler, Erich Ludendorff, Ernst Röhm and Hermann Kriebel. In recognition of his participation, he later would be awarded the Blood Order.

With the collapse of the coup, the Bund was banned on 9 November and Weber was arrested the same day. He subsequently was brought to trial with Hitler and other coup leaders before the People's Court in Munich in February 1924. Weber appeared in court attired in a military uniform complete with dress sword and wearing the blue cap of the banned Bund Oberland. At the conclusion of the trial on 1 April, he was found guilty of treason and sentenced to five years of fortress confinement with credit for time served and eligible for parole in six months. He was held in Landsberg Prison together with Hitler and other putsch leaders. Following his conviction, the State Ministry of Education and Religious Affairs immediately dismissed Weber from his university post.

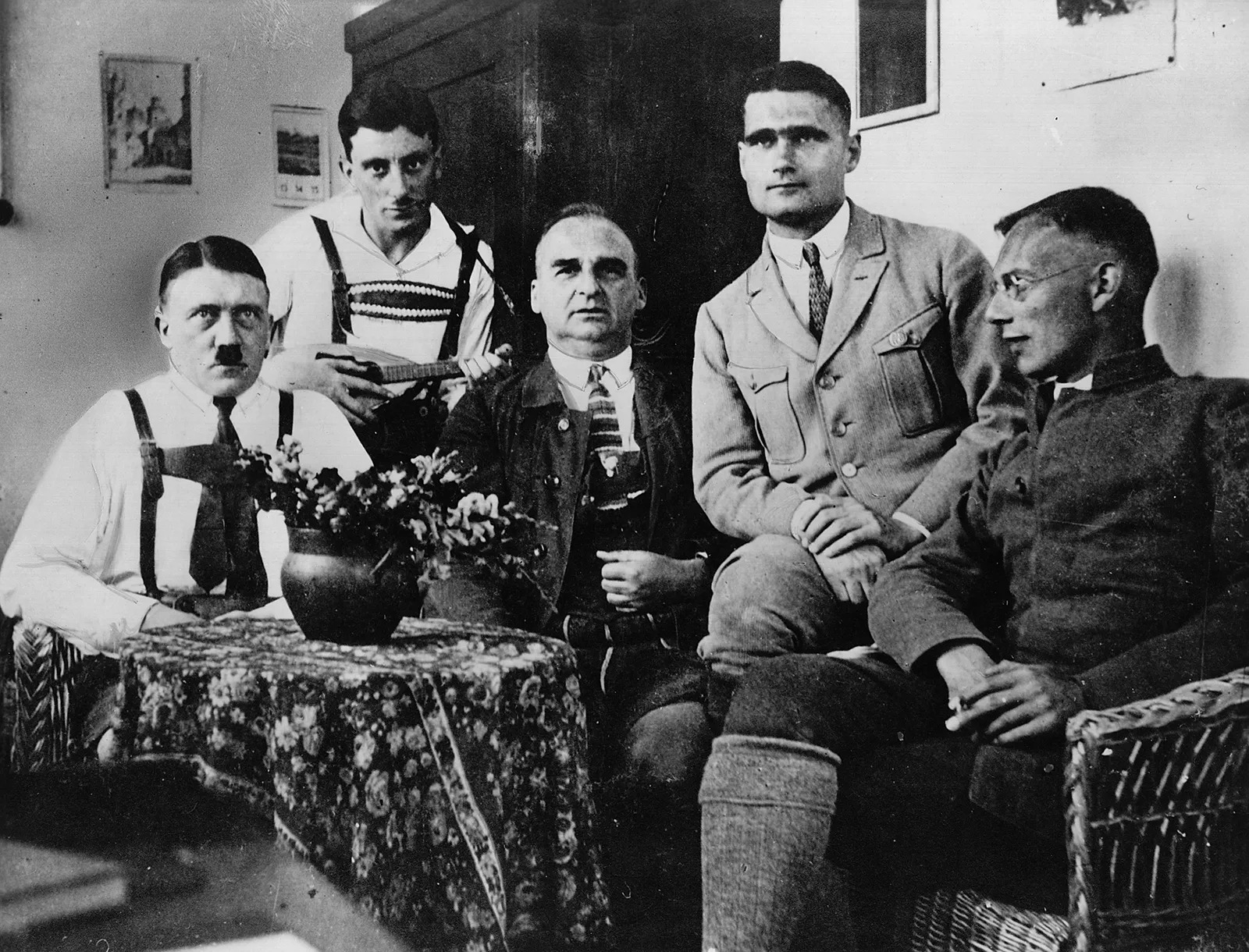
From left to right: Adolf Hitler, Emil Maurice, Hermann Kriebel, Rudolf Hess and Weber in Landsberg Prison, 1924

With Weber incarcerated, elements of the former Bund Oberland continued to operate clandestinely. Seeking to maintain his independence and freedom of action, Weber ordered former members to refuse attempts to integrate them into the Frontbann, an SA front organization being organized by Röhm. Instead, a successor organization to the Bund called the Deutscher Schützen- und Wanderbund (German Shooting and Hiking League) was established on 20 July 1924. An investigation by the Bavarian state prosecutor found grounds to charge Weber and the leaders of this organization with continuing to effectively operate the Bund in violation of the ban. Consequently, he was not paroled in December 1924 when Hitler left Landsberg.

=== Release from prison and resumption of leadership ===
By early 1925, Weber was released from imprisonment under terms of a general amnesty, passed his district level professional examination and returned to work at the Veterinary Medical Clinic and the Institute of Veterinary Pathology in Munich. He moved to Berlin in 1926 and, in the autumn of that year, established himself as a veterinarian at Euerdorf in Lower Franconia where he practiced until 1933.

Following the lifting of the ban on the Bund Oberland on 14 February 1925, it was re-founded on 13 March and Weber officially resumed the leadership. However, due to the improving economic situation and the resulting increased stability of the republic, the Bund, along with other anti-republican paramilitary units, experienced a loss of membership and influence over the next few years. Serious fissures developed within the Bund, with Weber favoring closer ties with the Nazis, and others supporting National Bolshevism. After unsuccessfully attempting to incorporate the Bund Oberland into the Nazi Schutzstaffel (SS), Weber announced his resignation as Bundesführer on 7 November 1929. Weber joined the Nazi Party on 1 September 1932 with membership number 1,310,670, and later was awarded the Golden Party Badge.

== Career in Nazi Germany ==
Following the Nazi seizure of power, Weber was appointed Veterinärmedizinalrat 1. Klasse (veterinary medical councilor, 1st class) and political adjutant in the Bavarian Ministry of the Interior on 1 May 1933. On 25 August 1933, he was appointed to a post in the Reichsleitung (national leadership) at the Nazi Party headquarters, with the mandate to bring the veterinary profession into line with Nazi ideology in the process known as Gleichschaltung. Concurrently, he served as the representative of the veterinary profession on the newly formed Council of Experts for Public Health. On 15 February 1934, he was appointed Reichstierärzteführer (Reich Veterinarian Leader). In July 1936, Weber was named Leiter (leader) of the Reichstierärztekammer (Reich Veterinary Chamber). This newly formed entity joined all German veterinarians into one monolithic bureaucracy. Under his tenure, the organization eliminated Jews from the profession and led attacks against kosher slaughtering practices. In 1937, Weber arranged for the purchase by the Reichstierärztekammer of Burg Hoheneck from the estate of his late father-in-law, Julius Friedrich Lehmann, a publisher of Völkish and antisemitic books. The castle was used as a central meeting and training venue for Weber's organization.

Weber also held government posts in the Reich Ministry of the Interior, which was headed by Wilhelm Frick, a fellow participant in the 1923 putsch who had been convicted along with him. Weber was appointed as a Ministerialrat (ministerial councilor) on 1 April 1934 and was promoted to Ministerialdirigent on 1 June 1935 and to Ministerialdirektor on 20 April 1936. On 26 July 1939, he was appointed an honorary professor on the faculty of veterinary medicine at the Humboldt University of Berlin.

=== SS membership ===
On 9 November 1933, the tenth anniversary of the Beer Hall Putsch, Weber was made a member of the Allgemeine SS (SS membership number 145,113) with the rank of SS-Standartenführer. He was promoted to SS-Oberführer on 20 April 1937 and assigned to the personal staff of the Reichsführer-SS. On 30 January 1941, he was advanced to SS-Brigadeführer, and he attained his final rank of SS-Gruppenführer on 9 November 1944.

== Post-war denazification ==
Following Germany's surrender in the Second World War in May 1945, Weber was taken into custody at Gmunden in Upper Austria on 9 May by American Counterintelligence Corps forces. He was held in prisoner of war camps at Natternberg, Plattling and Regensburg. During denazification proceedings at Regensburg on 22 June 1948, he was initially classified as belonging to Group I (major offenders), and was sentenced to five years in a labor camp, with credit for time served. Additionally, he was to forfeit all assets, was prohibited from voting, holding political office or belonging to professional or political organizations. His medical license was revoked, and he was prohibited from public employment or receipt of a public pension from prior service. In a subsequent appeal hearing by the Munich Appeals Chamber, he was reclassified into Group III (lesser offenders) on 3 May 1949. He was placed on probation for three years, ordered to pay a punitive fine of 1,000 DM and to cover legal costs totaling 22,000 DM. On further appeals, his probationary period was shortened to end on 1 May 1950 and, on 1 September 1950, he was reclassified into Group IV (followers). Weber returned to the field of veterinary medicine until his death, working for Dr. Richard Abelein on the development of artificial insemination for cattle, first as his secretary and then as a veterinary assistant with a monthly salary of 220 DM.

== Sources ==
- Ahrens, Rüdiger (2015). Bündische Jugend. Eine neue Geschichte 1918–1933. Göttingen: Wallstein Verlag. ISBN 978-3-835-31758-1.
- Albrecht, Stephanie (2006). Ein Leben für den Hufbeschlag. Tierärztliche Hochschule Hannover.
- Hübner, Christoph: Bund Oberland, 1921–1923/1925–1930. In: Historisches Lexikon Bayerns
- Insenhöfer, Svantje (2008). Dr. Friedrich Weber: Reichstierärzteführer von 1934 bis 1945. Tierärztliche Hochschule Hannover.
- Jablonsky, David (1989). The Nazi Party in Dissolution. Frank Cass and Company, Ltd. ISBN 0-71463-322-4.
- King, David (2017). The Trial of Adolf Hitler The Beer Hall Putsch and the Rise of Nazi Germany. London: Macmillan. ISBN 978-1-447-25111-8.
- Klee, Ernst (2007). Das Personenlexikon zum Dritten Reich. Wer war was vor und nach 1945. Frankfurt-am-Main: Fischer-Taschenbuch-Verlag. ISBN 978-3-596-16048-8.
- Möllers, Georg (2002). Jüdische Tierärzte im Deutschen Reich in der Zeit von 1918 bis 1945. Tierärztliche Hochschule Hannover.
- Sax, Boria (2013). Animals in the Third Reich. Yogh & Thorn Press. ISBN 978-0-922-55870-4.
- Schiffer Publishing Ltd., ed. (2000). SS Officers List: SS-Standartenführer to SS-Oberstgruppenführer (As of 30 January 1942). Schiffer Military History Publishing. ISBN 0-7643-1061-5.
