= Heinz Pernet =

Nazi

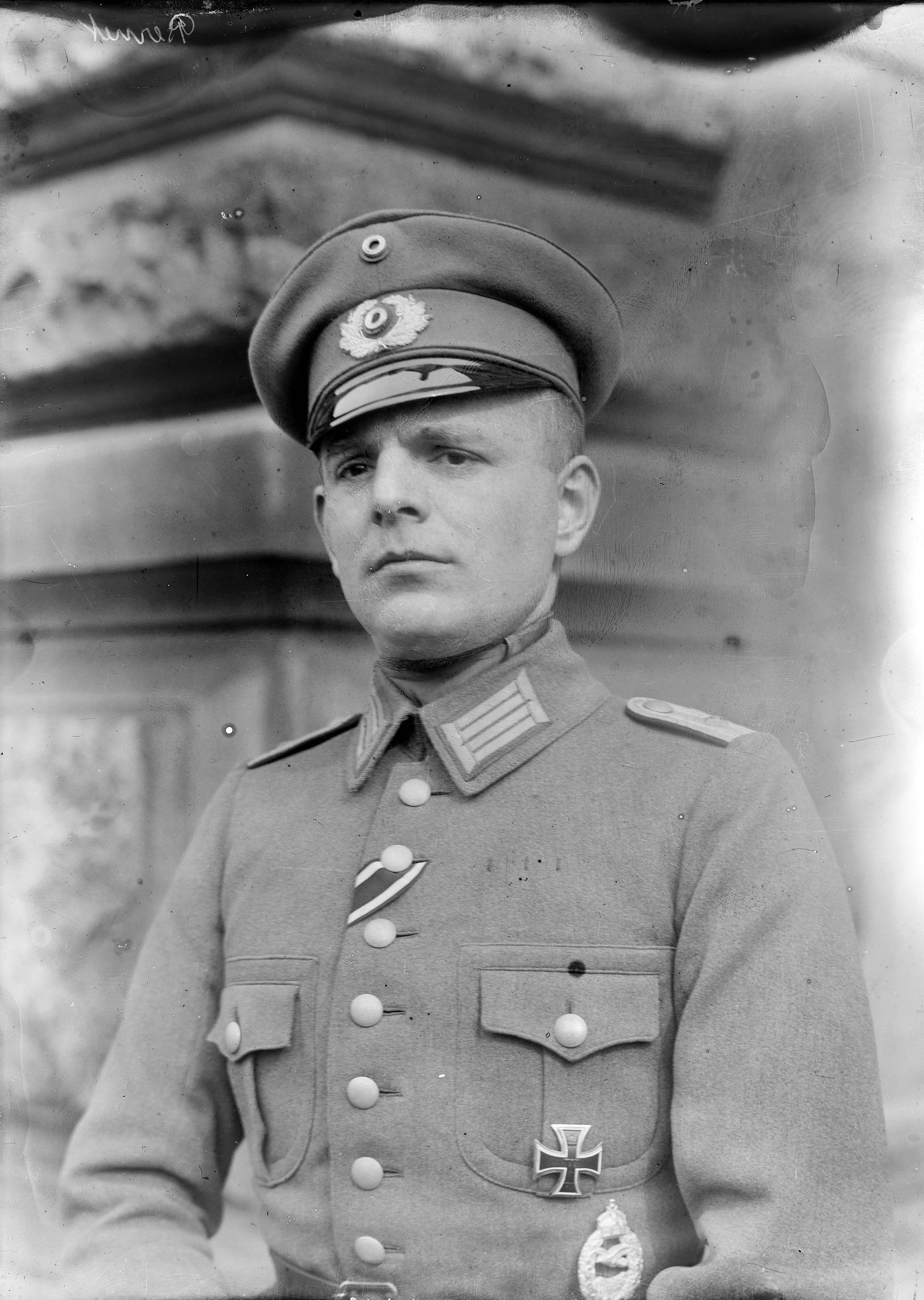
- Heinz Pernet 1924
- Born: 5 September 1896; Charlottenburg, Berlin, Germany
- Died: 30 June 1973 (aged 76); Freiburg im Breisgau, West Germany
- Relatives: Erich Ludendorff (stepfather)
- Military career
- Allegiance: German Empire; Weimar Republic
- Branch: Imperial German Army; Luftstreitkräfte; Freikorps
- Rank: Leutnant
- Conflicts: World War I
- Awards: Iron Cross, 2nd and 1st class

Heinz Pernet (5 September 1896 – 30 June 1973) was a German military officer and Erich Ludendorff's stepson. He was a participant in the Beer Hall Putsch of November 1923. He was among the nine men tried along with Ludendorff and Adolf Hitler in 1924. He was convicted and sentenced to 15 months imprisonment for aiding and abetting treason, but served only 4 months. He later became an SA-Brigadeführer.

== Early life ==
Pernet was born in Charlottenburg, the son of Margarethe Schmidt and her husband Karl Maria Anton Robert Pernet. After their divorce, Margarethe took care of Heinz and his two brothers and a sister. In 1909, she married officer Erich Ludendorff, who thus became Pernet's stepfather. From 1914 to 1918, Pernet participated in the First World War, where he served as a pilot, as did both his brothers, who were shot down and killed in the course of the war.

== Post-war, Beer Hall Putsch participation and treason trial ==
After the war, Pernet was a member of the Guards Cavalry Rifle Division, a Freikorps unit later incorporated into the Reichswehr, until the spring of 1923, when he moved to Munich. There he came into contact with the Nazi Party through his stepfather, who was an early supporter of the party and acquainted with Adolf Hitler.

In November 1923, Pernet took part in the Beer Hall Putsch in Munich. On the evening of 8 November, he participated in the occupation of the Bürgerbräukeller and then picked up his stepfather in his villa, together with Max Erwin von Scheubner-Richter. On Hitler's orders, Pernet seized large sums of money (1,460 trillion Reichsmark) in the Jewish printing house Mülthaler and Parcus on the night of 8–9 November in order to distribute to the putschists in support of the coup d'état.

On the morning of 9 November 1923, Pernet marched to the Feldherrnhalle in the second row of the putschists (behind Hitler, Ludendorff, Scheubner-Richter, Hermann Göring, Kurt Neubauer, and Ulrich Graf).

After the defeat of the coup by the provincial police, Pernet was able to flee. In the spring of 1924, he surrendered himself to the Bavarian authorities. From 26 February to 1 April 1924, the criminal trial for high treason took place before the People's Court of Munich I. The court acknowledged mitigating circumstances. Under the presiding judge, Georg Neithardt, he was convicted and sentenced to 15 months imprisonment for aiding and abetting treason, but served only 4 months before being released.

== Later life ==
From 15 September 1924 to 31 March 1926, Pernet worked as an office worker at the Motor Technology Society in Munich. He then took over a position at the Chemical Study Society in Freiberg from 15 April 1926 to 30 November 1928. From June 1929 to 30 June 1933, he finally worked for Siemens & Halske, an electrical engineering company.

On 1 February 1932, Pernet joined the Nazi Party, where he received the party member number 887,088. He also became a member of the Sturmabteilung (SA). On 31 August 1933, he received the rank of SA-Standartenführer – a leadership position in SA-Brigade 53 in Karlsruhe.

On 1 March 1935, Pernet took up a position as adjutant of the Reichsstatthalter (Reich governor) of Bavaria, Franz Ritter von Epp. He held that position until 1938, when he was appointed chief adjutant on the staff of Franz Schwarz, the party's Reichsschatzmeister (treasurer), and was further promoted to SA-Oberführer. On 30 January 1942, he attained the rank of SA-Brigadeführer. By that time, the SA had almost completely lost its influence, and lacked the manpower and support to play any significant role within the structure of the state.

With the end of World War II, Pernet was briefly detained by the Allies, but was released in 1946 when the International Military Tribunal at Nuremberg formally judged the SA not to be a criminal organization. He retired to Freiburg, where he lived until his death in 1973.

Pernet married physiotherapist Christine Mathilde (born 22 February 1906 in Reez; died 29 August 1967 in Freiburg) in 1936. They had three children.
