= People's Court (Bavaria) =

Special courts in Bavaria (1918–1924)

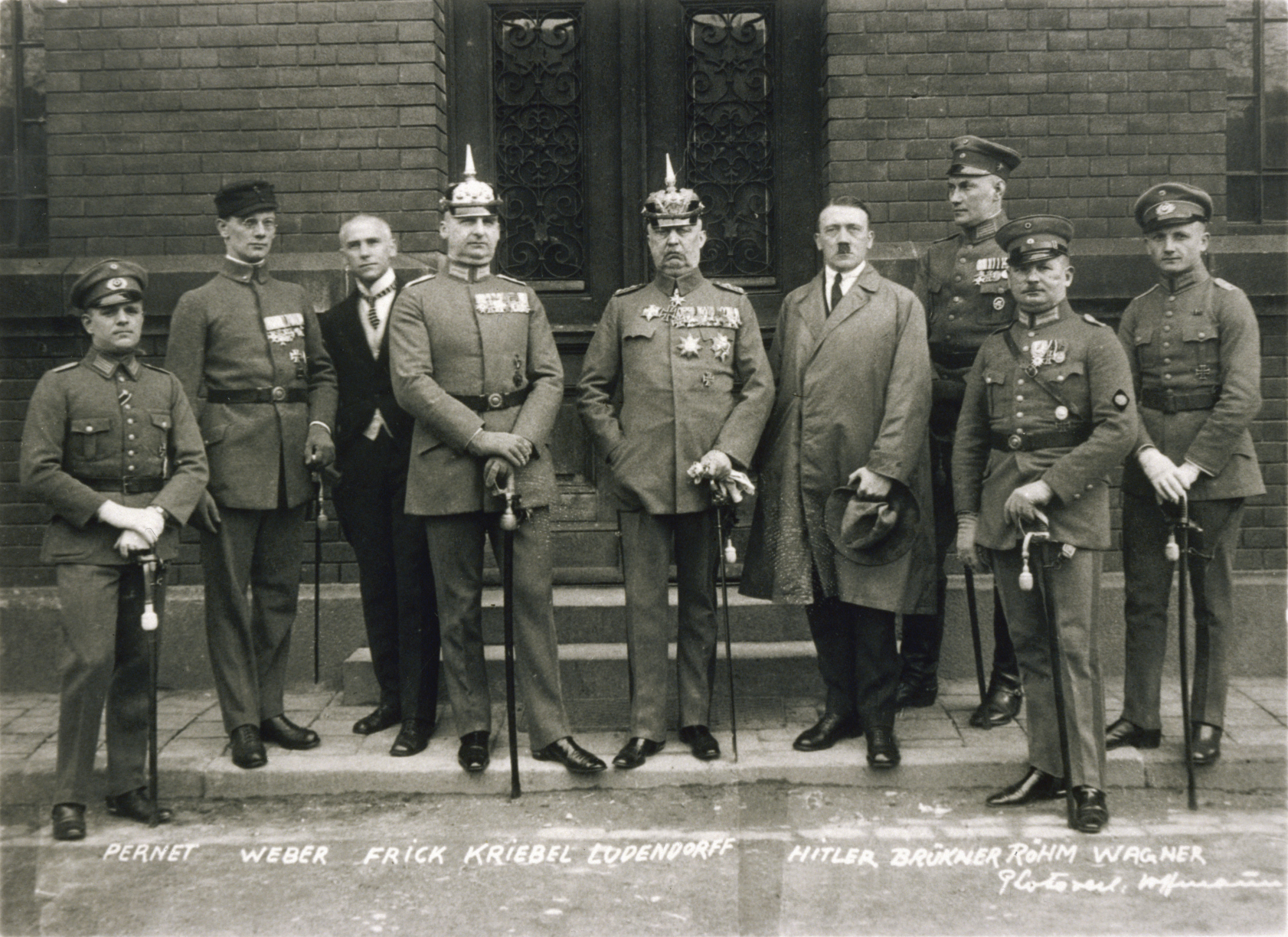
Defendants in the Beer Hall Putsch trial at the People's Court in Munich

The People's Courts of Bavaria (Volksgerichte) were Sondergerichte (special courts) established by Kurt Eisner during the German Revolution in November 1918 and part of the Ordnungszelle that lasted until May 1924 after handing out more than 31,000 sentences. It was composed of two judges and three lay judges. One of its most notable trials was that of the Beer Hall Putsch conspirators, including Adolf Hitler, Erich Ludendorff, Wilhelm Frick, Friedrich Weber, and Ernst Röhm, which lasted from 26 February 1924 until 1 April 1924.

Initially established in each court district by the Order of 16 November 1918 (Verordnung vom 16 November 1918) by the government of Kurt Eisner, it was furthered by the government of Johannes Hoffmann in the Law on the Establishment of People's Courts in Civil Disturbances of 12 July 1919 (Gesetz über die Einsetzung von Volksgerichten bei inneren Unruhen vom 12 Juli 1919). An agreement between the federal government and the government of Bavaria had fixed the deadline for the abolition of the courts on 1 April 1924. In this form they remained until May 1924 after handing out more than 31,000 sentences. Initially intended as a short-term solution for events surrounding the German Revolution, they became seen as part of the Ordnungszelle.

== See also ==
- People's Court (Germany)
- Sondergerichte
- Emminger Reform
- Judiciary of Germany
