= Wilhelm Frick =

German Nazi Party politician (1877–1946)

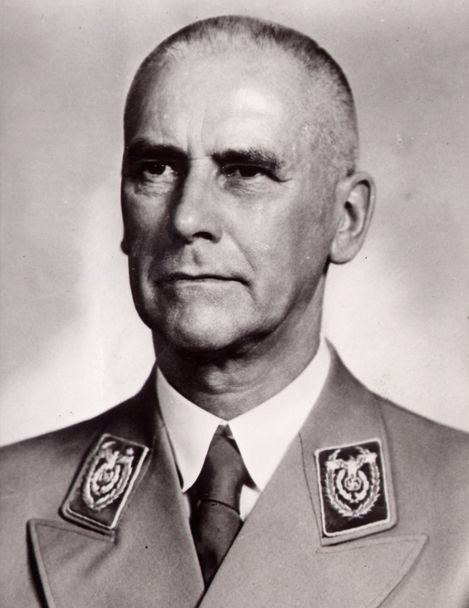
- Frick in c. 1940–1945

Reichsminister of the Interior
- In office 30 January 1933 – 20 August 1943
- President: Paul von Hindenburg (1933–1934); Adolf Hitler (1934–1943; as Führer)
- Chancellor: Adolf Hitler
- Preceded by: Franz Bracht
- Succeeded by: Heinrich Himmler

General Plenipotentiary for Administration of the Reich
- In office 4 September 1938 – 20 August 1943
- Appointed by: Adolf Hitler
- Preceded by: Office established
- Succeeded by: Heinrich Himmler

Protector of Bohemia and Moravia
- In office 24 August 1943 – 8 May 1945
- Appointed by: Adolf Hitler
- Preceded by: Konstantin von Neurath (de jure); Kurt Daluege (de facto)
- Succeeded by: Position abolished

Reichsminister without Portfolio
- In office 24 August 1943 – 30 April 1945

Additional positions
- 1939–1945: Member of the Council of Ministers for the Defense of the Reich
- 1934–1945: Member of the Prussian State Council
- 1933–1945: Reichsleiter
- 1933–1945: Member of the Reichstag (Nazi Germany)
- 1924–1933: Member of the Reichstag (Weimar Republic)

Personal details
- Born: 12 March 1877 Alsenz, German Empire
- Died: 16 October 1946 (aged 69) Nuremberg, Allied-occupied Germany
- Party: Nazi Party
- Spouses: Elisabetha Emilie Nagel (m. 1910; div. 1934); Margarete Schultze-Naumburg (m. 1934)
- Children: 5
- Education: Ludwig-Maximilians-Universität München; University of Göttingen; Friedrich Wilhelm University of Berlin; Heidelberg University
- Occupation: Attorney
- Criminal information
- Status: Executed by hanging
- Convictions: Crimes of aggression War crimes Crimes against humanity
- Trial: Nuremberg trials
- Penalty: Death

Wilhelm Frick (12 March 1877 – 16 October 1946) was a German politician of the Nazi Party (NSDAP) and convicted war criminal. He served as Minister of the Interior in Adolf Hitler's cabinet from 1933 to 1943 and as the last governor of the Protectorate of Bohemia and Moravia.

As the head of the Kriminalpolizei (criminal police) in Munich, Frick took part in Hitler's failed Beer Hall Putsch of 1923, for which he was convicted of high treason. He managed to avoid imprisonment and soon afterwards became a leading figure of the Nazi Party (NSDAP) in the Reichstag. In 1930, Frick became the first Nazi to hold a ministerial-level post at any level in Germany. He served in Thuringia as the state Minister of the Interior.

After Hitler became Chancellor of Germany in 1933, Frick joined the new government and was named Minister of the Interior. Additionally, on 21 May 1935, Frick was named Generalbevollmächtigter für die Reichsverwaltung (General Plenipotentiary for the Administration of the Reich). He was instrumental in formulating laws that consolidated the Nazi regime (Gleichschaltung), as well as laws that defined the Nazi racial policy, most notoriously the Nuremberg Laws. On 30 August 1939, immediately prior to the outbreak of the Second World War, Frick was appointed by Hitler to the six-person Council of Ministers for Defense of the Reich which operated as a war cabinet. Following the rise of the SS, Frick gradually lost favour within the party, and in 1943 he was replaced by Heinrich Himmler as interior minister. Frick remained in the cabinet as a minister without portfolio until Hitler's death in 1945.

After World War II, Frick was tried and convicted of war crimes at the Nuremberg trials and executed by hanging.

== Early life ==
Born in the Palatinate municipality of Alsenz, then part of the Kingdom of Bavaria, Germany, the last of four children of Protestant teacher Wilhelm Frick sen. (d. 1918) and his wife Henriette (née Schmidt). He attended the gymnasium in Kaiserslautern, passing his Abitur exams in 1896. He went on studying philology at the Ludwig-Maximilians-Universität München, but soon after turned to study law at Heidelberg University and the Friedrich Wilhelm University of Berlin. He received his doctorate of law in 1901. He joined the Bavarian civil service in 1903, working as an attorney at the Munich Police Department. He was appointed a Bezirksamtassessor in Pirmasens in 1907 and became acting district executive in 1914. Rejected as unfit, Frick did not serve in World War I. He was promoted to the official rank of a Regierungsassessor and, at his own request, re-assumed his post at the Munich Police Department in 1917.

On 25 April 1910, Frick married Elisabetha Emilie Nagel (1890–1978) in Pirmasens. They had two sons and a daughter. The marriage ended in an ugly divorce in 1934. A few weeks later, on 12 March, Frick remarried in Münchberg Margarete Schultze-Naumburg (1896–1960), the former wife of the Nazi Reichstag MP Paul Schultze-Naumburg. Margarete gave birth to a son and a daughter.

== Nazi career ==
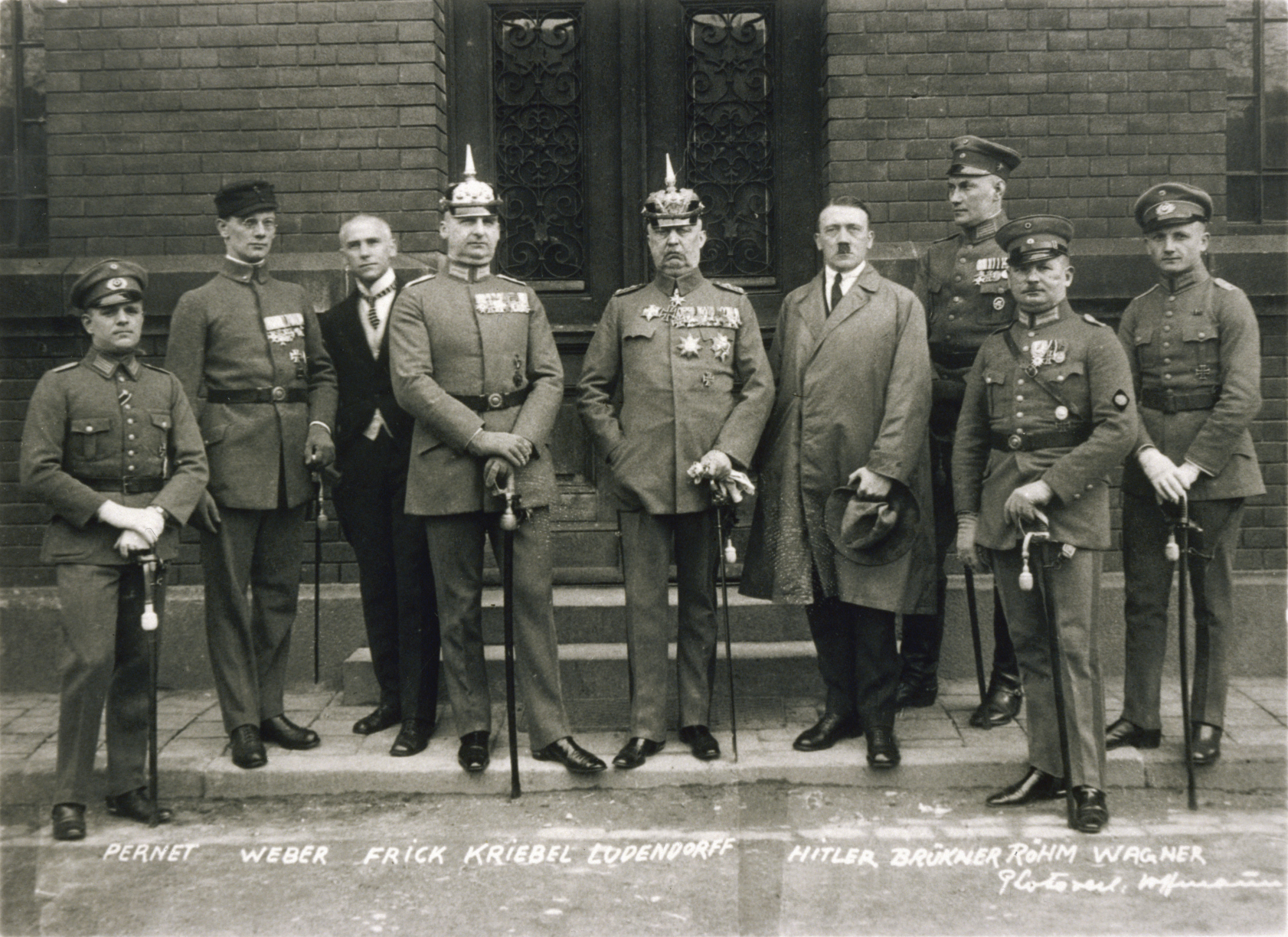
Frick (3rd from left) among the defendants in the Munich Beer Hall Putsch trial, 1924. Adolf Hitler is 4th from the right.

In Munich, Frick witnessed the end of the war and the German Revolution of 1918–1919. He sympathized with right-wing Freikorps paramilitary units. Chief of Police Ernst Pöhner introduced him to Adolf Hitler, whom he helped willingly with obtaining permission to hold political rallies and demonstrations.

Elevated to the rank of an Oberamtmann and head of the Political department of the Munich police from 1923, he and Pöhner participated in Hitler's failed Beer Hall Putsch on 9 November. Frick tried to suppress the State Police's operation, wherefore he was arrested and imprisoned, and tried for aiding and abetting high treason by the People's Court in April 1924. After several months in custody, he was given a suspended sentence of 15 months' imprisonment and was dismissed from his police job. Later during the disciplinary proceedings, the dismissal was declared unfair and revoked, on the basis that his treasonous intention had not been proven. Frick went on to work at the Munich social insurance office from 1926 onwards, in the rank of a Regierungsrat 1st class by 1933.

In the aftermath of the putsch, Wilhelm Frick was elected a member of the German Reichstag parliament in the federal election of May 1924. He had been nominated by the National Socialist Freedom Movement, an electoral list of the far-right German Völkisch Freedom Party and then banned Nazi Party. On 1 September 1925, Frick joined the re-established Nazi Party. On 20 May 1928, he was one of the first 12 deputies elected to the Reichstag as Nazi Party members. He associated himself with the radical Gregor Strasser; making his name by aggressive anti-democratic and antisemitic Reichstag speeches, he climbed to the post of the Nazi parliamentary group leader (Fraktionsführer) in 1928. He would continue to be elected to the Reichstag in every subsequent election in the Weimar and Nazi regimes. First elected from the Nazi electoral list in 1928, he was returned as a deputy from electoral constituency 27 (Palatinate) in 1930 and from constituency 12 (Thuringia) thereafter.

After the 1929 Thuringian state election, as the price for joining the coalition government of the Land (state) of Thuringia, the NSDAP received the state ministries of the Interior and Education. On 23 January 1930, Frick was appointed to these ministries, becoming the first Nazi to hold a ministerial-level post at any level in Germany (though he remained a member of the Reichstag). Frick used his position to dismiss Communist and Social Democratic officials and replace them with Nazi Party members, so Thuringia's federal subsidies were temporarily suspended by Reich Minister Carl Severing. Frick also appointed the eugenicist Hans F. K. Günther as a professor of social anthropology at the University of Jena, banned several newspapers, and banned pacifist drama and anti-war films such as All Quiet on the Western Front. He was removed from office by a Social Democratic motion of no confidence in the Thuringian Landtag parliament on 1 April 1931.

== Reich Minister ==
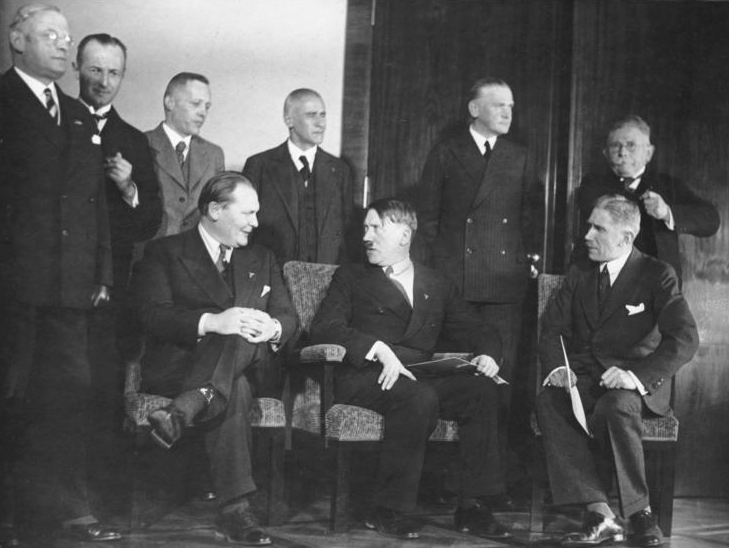
Press session after the first meeting of Hitler's cabinet on 30 January 1933: Frick standing 4th from left

When Reich president Paul von Hindenburg appointed Hitler chancellor on 30 January 1933, Frick joined his government as Reichsminister of the Interior. Together with Reichstag President Hermann Göring, he was one of only two Nazi Reichsministers in the original Hitler Cabinet, and the only one who actually had a portfolio; Göring served as minister without portfolio until 5 May. Though Frick held a key position, especially in organizing the federal elections of March 1933, he initially had far less power than his counterparts in the rest of Europe. Notably, he had no authority over the police; in Germany law enforcement has traditionally been a state and local matter. Indeed, the main reason that Hindenburg and Franz von Papen agreed to give the Interior Ministry to the Nazis was that it was almost powerless at the time. A mighty rival arose in the establishment of the Propaganda Ministry under Joseph Goebbels on 13 March.

Frick's power dramatically increased as a result of the Reichstag Fire Decree and the Enabling Act of 1933. The provision of the Reichstag Fire Decree giving the cabinet the power to take over state governments on its own authority was actually his idea; he saw the fire as a chance to increase his power and begin the process of Nazifying the country. He was responsible for drafting many of the Gleichschaltung laws that consolidated the Nazi regime. Within two weeks of the Enabling Act's passage, Frick helped draft the "Second Law on the Coordination of the States with the Reich" (7 April 1933) appointing Reichsstatthalter (Reich Governors) to take over the state governments. He also initiated and drafted the Law Against the Formation of Parties (14 July 1933) that formally made the NSDAP the only legal party in Germany. Under the 30 January 1934 "Law on the Reconstruction of the Reich", which converted Germany into a highly centralized state, state parliaments were dissolved and the newly implemented Reichsstatthalter were made directly responsible to him. He also drafted the Law on the Abolition of the Reichsrat (14 February 1934) that abolished the upper chamber of the Reich parliament. Frick also was made a member of Hans Frank's Academy for German Law.

On 10 October 1933, Hitler appointed Frick a Reichsleiter, the second highest political rank in the Nazi Party. On 1 May 1934, he replaced Minister-President Göring as Prussian Minister of the Interior, which gave him control over the police in Prussia. As a member of the Prussian cabinet, he also became an ex officio member of the Prussian State Council. By 1935, he also had near-total control over local government. He had the sole power to appoint the mayors of all municipalities with populations greater than 100,000 (except for the city states of Berlin and Hamburg, where Hitler reserved the right to appoint the mayors himself if he deemed it necessary). He also had considerable influence over smaller towns as well; while their mayors were appointed by the state governors, as mentioned earlier the governors were responsible to him.

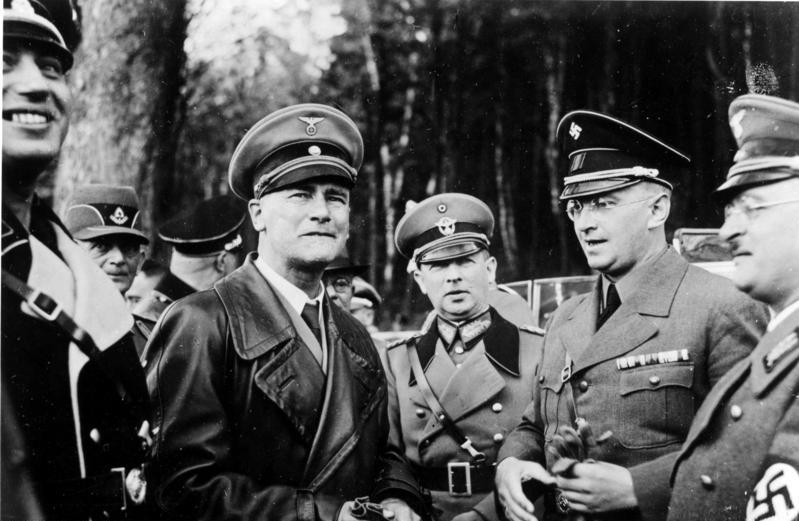
Frick (2nd from left) with Konrad Henlein on visit in Sudetenland, 1938

Frick was instrumental in the racial policy of Nazi Germany, drafting laws against Jewish citizens like the "Law for the Restoration of the Professional Civil Service" and the notorious Nuremberg Laws in September 1935. Already in July 1933, he had implemented the Law for the Prevention of Hereditarily Diseased Offspring including forced sterilizations, which later culminated in the killings of the Action T4 "euthanasia" programme supported by his ministry. Frick also took a leading part in Germany's re-armament in violation of the 1919 Versailles Treaty. He drafted laws introducing universal military conscription and extending the Wehrmacht service law to Austria after the 1938 Anschluss, as well as to the "Sudetenland" territories of the First Czechoslovak Republic annexed according to the Munich Agreement.

In the summer of 1938 Frick was named the patron (Schirmherr) of the Deutsches Turn- und Sportfest in Breslau, a patriotic sports festival attended by Hitler and much of the Nazi leadership. In this event he presided the ceremony of "handing over" the new Nazi Reich Sports League (NSRL) standard to Reichssportführer Hans von Tschammer und Osten, marking the further Nazification of sports in Germany. On 11 November 1938, Frick promulgated the Regulations Against Jews' Possession of Weapons.

From the mid-to-late 1930s Frick lost favour irreversibly within the Nazi Party after a power struggle involving attempts to resolve the lack of coordination within the Reich government. For example, in 1933 he tried to restrict the widespread use of "protective custody" orders that were used to send people to concentration camps, only to be begged off by Reichsführer-SS Heinrich Himmler. His power was greatly reduced in June 1936 when Hitler named Himmler the Chief of German Police, which effectively united the police with the SS. On paper, Frick was Himmler's immediate superior. In fact, the police were now independent of Frick's control, since the SS was responsible only to Hitler. A long-running power struggle between the two culminated in Frick's being replaced by Himmler as Reichsminister of the Interior in August 1943. However, he remained in the cabinet as a Reichsminister without portfolio. Besides Hitler, he and Lutz Graf Schwerin von Krosigk were the only members of the Third Reich's cabinet to serve continuously from Hitler's appointment as Chancellor until his death.

Frick's replacement as Reichsminister of the Interior did not reduce the growing administrative chaos and infighting between party and state agencies. Frick was then appointed as Protector of Bohemia and Moravia, making him Hitler's personal representative in the Czech lands. Its capital Prague, where Frick used ruthless methods to counter dissent, was one of the last Axis-held cities to fall at the end of World War II in Europe.

== Trial and execution ==
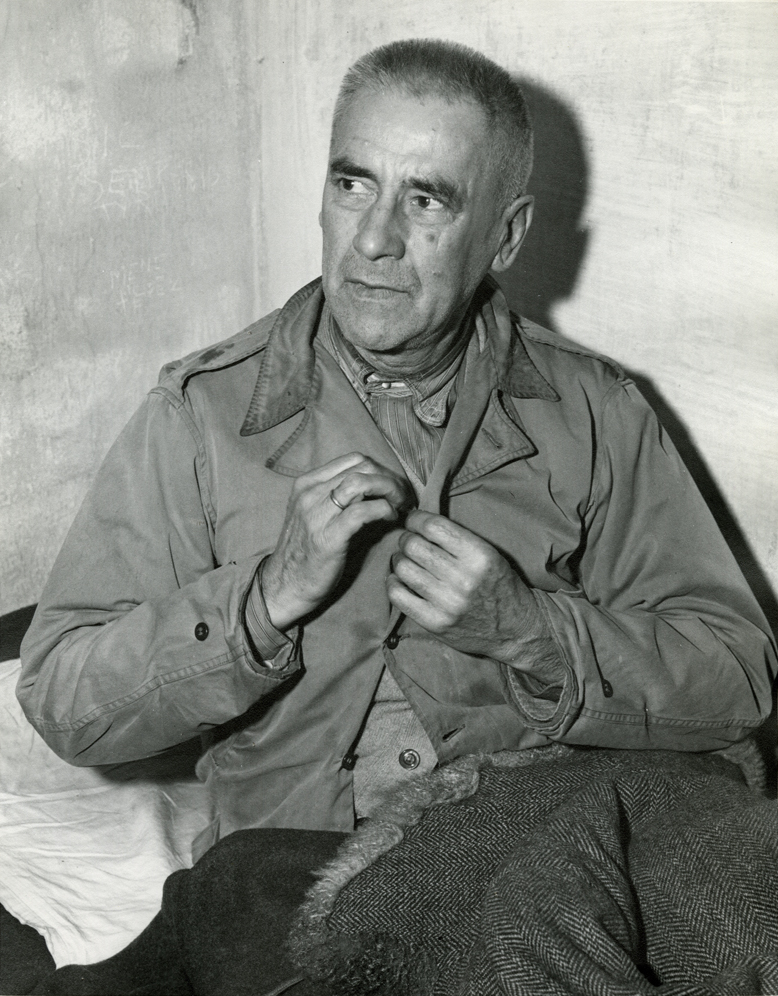
Frick in his cell, November 1945

Frick was arrested, and was arraigned at the Nuremberg trials, where he was the only defendant besides Rudolf Hess who refused to testify on his own behalf. Frick was convicted of planning, initiating and waging wars of aggression, war crimes and crimes against humanity, and for his role, as Minister of the Interior, in formulating the Enabling Act and the Nuremberg Laws—laws under which people were deported to concentration camps, many of them being murdered there. Frick was also accused of being one of the most senior people responsible for the existence of the concentration camps.

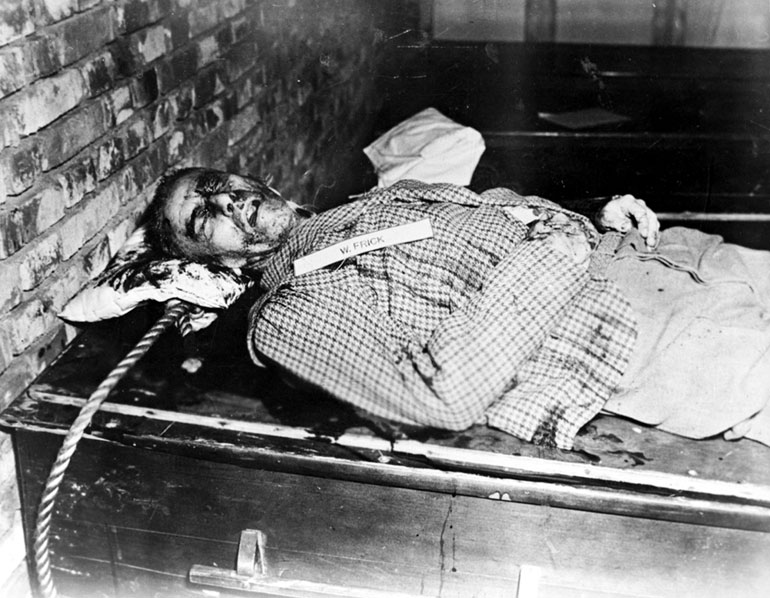
The corpse of Frick after his execution at Nuremberg, October 1946. Injuries were caused from hitting his head on the trap door.

Frick was sentenced to death on 1 October 1946, and was hanged at Nuremberg Prison on 16 October. Of his execution, journalist Joseph Kingsbury-Smith wrote:

The sixth man to leave his prison cell and walk with handcuffed wrists to the death house was 69-year-old Wilhelm Frick. He entered the execution chamber at 2.05 am, six minutes after Rosenberg had been pronounced dead. He seemed the least steady of any so far and stumbled on the thirteenth step of the gallows. His only words were, "Long live eternal Germany", before he was hooded and dropped through the trap.

His body, along with those of the other nine executed men and the corpse of Hermann Göring, was cremated at the Ostfriedhof Cemetery in Munich, and the ashes were scattered in the river Isar.

== See also ==
- Glossary of Nazi Germany
- List of Nazi Party leaders and officials

== Sources ==
- Manvell, Roger (2011) [1962]. Goering. Skyhorse. ISBN 978-1-61608-109-6.
- Overy, Richard J. (2001). The Battle of Britain: The Myth and the Reality. New York: W.W. Norton. ISBN 978-0-393-02008-3.

Political offices
Preceded by Franz Bracht	German Minister of the Interior; 1933–1943	Succeeded by Heinrich Himmler
Government offices
Preceded by Konstantin von Neurath; Kurt Daluege (acting)	Protector of Bohemia and Moravia; 1943–1945	Succeeded by Office abolished
