= Georg Neithardt =

German judge (1871–1941)

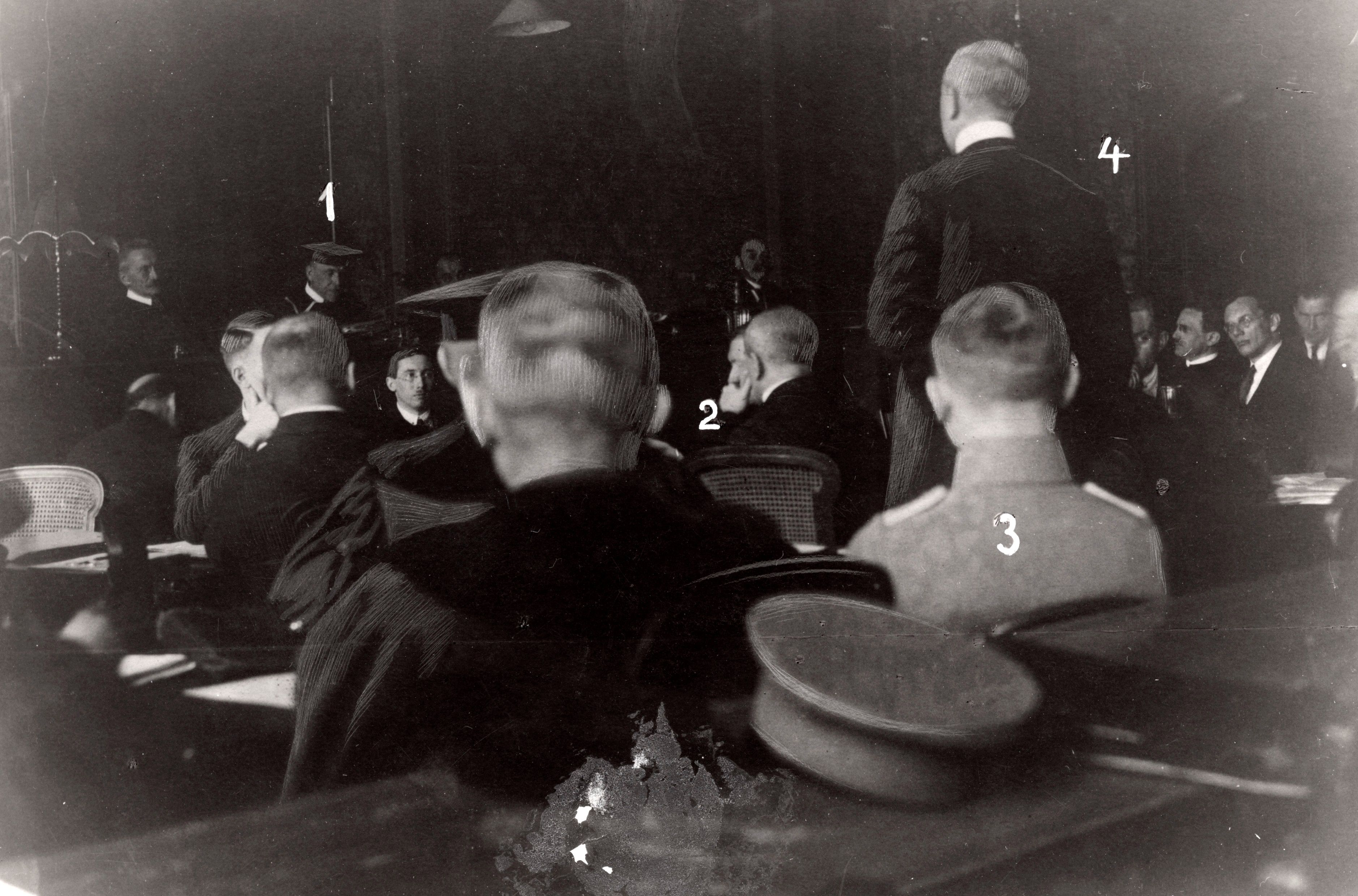
Neithardt (1) presiding over the Beer Hall Putsch trial, 1924

Georg Neithardt (31 January 1871 — 1 November 1941) was the district court director of the Munich People's Court in Germany's Weimar Republic. In February and March 1924, Neithardt presided over the trial of Adolf Hitler, Erich Ludendorff, and eight additional leaders of the 1923 Beer Hall Putsch. He also presided over the trial of Anton Graf von Arco auf Valley.

== Bayernbund meeting trial ==
In September 1921, Hitler was arrested after he and members of his SA paramilitary faction disrupted a Bayernbund meeting hosting the federalist Ballerstedt. Neithardt presided over Hitler's trial, which sentenced Hitler to three months in prison. Hitler served one month of his sentence.

== Beer Hall Putsch trial/Munich Putsch trial ==
Sympathetic to far-right politics in Germany, Neithardt presided over the Beer Hall Putsch trial, which lasted from 26 February to 1 April 1924. Neithardt treated Hitler, Ludendorff and other defendants on friendly terms, and referred to Ludendorff as "your excellency." Hitler used the trial to propagandize against democracy in Germany and argued that his attempted coup-d'etat could not have been treason, if its aim was to negate the treason of Germany's armistice signed in 1918. Hitler was convicted and sentenced to five years in prison but served only nine months of his sentence.
