= Walter Stennes =

Nazi regional stormtrooper leader (1895–1983)

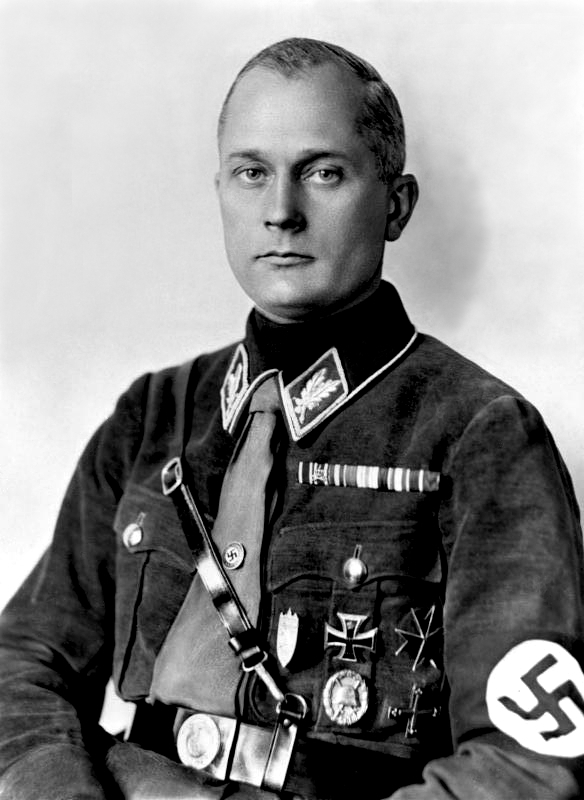

Regional commander in Eastern Germany
- In office 30 September 1927 – April 1931
- Supreme SA Leader: Franz Pfeffer von Salomon; Adolf Hitler

Personal details
- Born: Walter Franz Maria Stennes; 12 April 1895 Bad Wünnenberg, Province of Westphalia, Kingdom of Prussia, German Empire
- Died: 19 May 1983 (aged 88) Lüdenscheid, North Rhine-Westphalia, West Germany
- Party: German Social Party
- Other political affiliations: Nazi Party (1927–1931)
- Spouse: Hildegard Margarete Elisabeth Borkenhagen (m. 1930)
- Education: Schloss Bensberg
- Occupation: Military officer

Military service
- Allegiance: German Empire
- Branch/service: Imperial German Army
- Rank: Leutnant
- Unit: 3rd Westphalian Infantry Regiment
- Battles/wars: World War I; Western Front
- Awards: Iron Cross First Class; Knight's Cross of the House Order of Hohenzollern

Walter Franz Maria Stennes (12 April 1895 – 19 May 1983) was a leader of the Sturmabteilung (SA, stormtroopers, or "brownshirts") of the Nazi Party in Berlin and the surrounding area. In August 1930 he led a revolt against Adolf Hitler, the leader of the party, and Hitler's appointed regional head of the party in the Berlin area, Joseph Goebbels. The dispute was over Hitler's policies and practices in the use of the SA, and the underlying purpose of the paramilitary organization. Hitler quelled the revolt peacefully. After a second rebellion in March–April 1931, the SA was purged and Stennes was expelled from the party.

== Early life ==
Stennes was born in 1895 to Fritz Stennes, a bailiff and German Army officer, and his wife, Louise. He was educated at the cadet school, an official army-run military academy, at Schloss Bensberg. In 1910, he transferred to the Royal Prussian Main Cadet School in Berlin-Lichterfelde. His classmates there included Hermann Göring and Gerhard Roßbach.

After Stennes graduated in the summer of 1913, he entered officers' school. In August 1914 during World War I, he became a lieutenant with the 3rd Westphalian Infantry Regiment No. 16 in Belgium. Later on 23 August, he was wounded. In Flanders, he experienced the 1914 Christmas truce, where German and British front soldiers spontaneously fraternised, celebrating Christmas together.

He was decorated several times during the war. In May 1915, he was awarded the Iron Cross First Class. In June 1917, he earned the Knight's Cross of the House Order of Hohenzollern. In 1918, he received the Lippe War Merit Cross, the Hanseatic Cross and the Silver Wound Badge.

After leaving the army, Stennes held positions as a police captain and as a leader of the Freikorps, the volunteer paramilitary units made up largely of ex-servicemen. He was also an arms racketeer.

== Nazi Party ==
Stennes joined the Nazi Party in 1927. He took over the leadership of the Sturmabteilung in the Berlin Gau (region), replacing Kurt Daluege, and was appointed regional commander-in-chief of the SA in eastern Germany on 30 September 1927. In a reorganization of the SA command structure on 1 March 1928, Franz Pfeffer von Salomon the Supreme SA Leader, created seven regional commands, each headed by an SA-Oberführer. Later designated as deputy leaders of the SA, Stennes was appointed OSAF Stellvertreter Ost (transl. Deputy Supreme SA Leader East) with his headquarters in Berlin.

=== Stennes revolt ===
Stennes led a revolt in August 1930 with members of the Berlin SA, voicing their objections to the policies and purposes of the SA, as defined by Hitler. The SA was dissatisfied with Hitler's policy after the Beer Hall Putsch to gain power by legal means. The stormtroopers bridled under the slow pace inherent in that political strategy, and wanted a revolution, but Hitler intended to use them only for specific purposes as needed by the party.

The stormtroopers complained about "bossism", favouritism, poor pay, as well as the SA's dependence on the party for funding. They claimed that those in the party lived in "luxury" while the SA men worked until exhaustion. In particular, Stennes severely criticised Hitler for spending so much on buying and renovating the Brown House in Munich, to serve as party headquarters while the men of the SA were underpaid. Although the complaints of the SA in Berlin were the most prominent, similar feelings were starting to arise in SA men across the whole of Germany.

On 27 August, Stennes threatened Joseph Goebbels, the head of the party in Berlin, stating that he wanted three seats in the Reichstag which was something the head of the SA, Pfeffer, had pushed for at a meeting in early August. Stennes also wanted more money for the SA and more political power within the National Socialist movement. Hitler refused to take the complaints seriously and would not see Stennes when he came to Munich for a confrontation. Pfeffer, after having his demands for seats in the Reichstag denied, resigned as Supreme SA Leader on 4 August and Hitler assured Goebbels he would send the SA Stabschef, Otto Wagener, to set things right in the organization.

Stennes decided that firm action was needed for his threats to be taken seriously. Accordingly, the Berlin SA refused to provide protection for Goebbels at his Sportpalast speech on 30 August 1930 and his men instead held a parade on Wittenbergplatz, demonstrating against Goebbels, on the day after von Pfeffer's resignation from the SA became official. Goebbels turned to the SS, then still technically part of the SA, which provided the necessary security and protection at the meeting and was also assigned to protect the Gau office in Berlin.

The SA then stormed the Gau office on Hedemannstrasse, injuring the SS men and wrecking the premises. Goebbels, shaken by the incident, notified Hitler, who left the Wagner Festival at Bayreuth and flew immediately to Berlin, where Goebbels told him that a resolution of the problems with the SA was needed immediately to prevent the dissatisfaction in Berlin from spreading to the SA in the rest of Germany.

Hitler spoke with some SA men directly and then had two meetings with Stennes on the night of 31 August. The next day, at a meeting of 2,000 or so stormtroopers, Hitler announced that he would replace von Pfeffer as the Supreme Leader of the SA, a statement that was received with joy by the SA men. Hitler called for loyalty to him personally and to the Führerprinzip, and the assembled men took a loyalty oath, as would all stormtroopers throughout Germany and all men who later joined the organisation. Stennes then read Hitler's declaration that significant improvements would be made in the financial condition of the SA, the money to come from party dues. The stormtroopers would also have free legal representation if they were arrested in the line of duty. With those concessions, the crisis was over.

=== Expulsion ===
In spring 1931, Stennes continued to complain that the SA in Breslau was not able to turn out for inspection in February 1931 because they lacked footwear. He also believed that the strategy of legality was a failure, as shown by the party failure to win the 1930 Reichstag elections outright by a clear majority. He complained as well of Ernst Röhm's return to run the SA because of the Chief of Staff's homosexuality.

Stennes rebelled again. The SA once again stormed the party offices in Berlin on the night of 31 March – 1 April and took control of the building. In addition, the SA took over the offices of Goebbels' newspaper, Der Angriff. Pro-Stennes versions appeared of the newspaper on 1 April and 2 April.

Hitler instructed Goebbels to take whatever means were necessary to put down the revolt. Goebbels and Göring purged the SA in Berlin, and Stennes was expelled from the party.

There is some evidence that Stennes may have been paid by the government of German Chancellor Heinrich Brüning, with the intention of causing conflict within the Nazi movement.

== Exile ==
After the Nazi takeover in 1933, Stennes went with his wife and daughter into exile. Göring had made him promise to leave the country immediately and not to settle in Switzerland.

Stennes then emigrated to China and arrived with his wife in Shanghai on 19 November 1933 on board the steamboat Ranchi. Stennes served as a military advisor to Chiang Kai-shek's Kuomintang (KMT) until 1949. His efforts were to reorganise the army and police forces of the KMT on the model of the Prussian Army.

== Return to Germany ==
Stennes returned to Germany in 1949. In 1951, he was a leading member of the right-wing German Social Party. Afterwards, he retired to private life. He applied for recognition as a victim of National Socialist tyranny, which was rejected in 1957 by the Federal Court. He lived in Lüdenscheid until his death in 1983.

== In popular culture ==
Stennes, played by Hanno Koffler, and his 1931 revolt are depicted in Season 4 of Babylon Berlin.

In the dramatic film The Man Who Crossed Hitler (2011), Stennes was portrayed by Ronan Vibert.
