= Stennes revolt =

1930–31 revolt within the Nazi Party

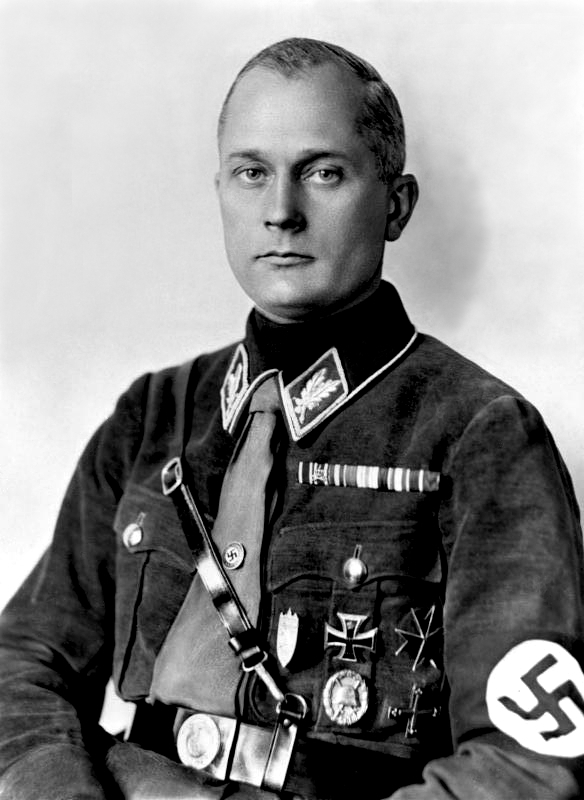
Walter Stennes, the Berlin chief of the Sturmabteilung, was the leader of the Stennes revolt.

The Stennes revolt (German: Stennes-Putsch) was a revolt within the Nazi Party by the Sturmabteilung (SA) in 1930 and 1931.

Members of the SA led by Berlin chief Walter Stennes, dissatisfied with the role and restrictions placed on them by Adolf Hitler, began to rebel against the Nazi Party leadership. Stennes issued a number of demands regarding the status of the SA and Nazi Party policy which were rejected by Hitler. Stennes ransacked the offices of the Berlin Gau twice as a show of force, which led to him and his supporters being expelled from the SA and the Nazi Party.

The Stennes revolt led to a temporary resumption of control of the SA by the Nazi Party leadership, and Hitler's appointment of Ernst Röhm as SA Chief. Many of the issues within the SA that provoked the revolt were not resolved and contributed to the Night of the Long Knives in 1934. The revolt was one of the first major actions of the Schutzstaffel which earned them the confidence of Hitler. There is some evidence suggesting that Stennes was paid by the government of Chancellor Heinrich Brüning, with the intention of causing conflict within and destabilizing the Nazi movement.

== Background ==
=== Status of the SA ===
The exact role and purpose of the Sturmabteilung (SA) within the Nazi movement was still unsettled in 1930. Nazi Party leader Adolf Hitler viewed the SA as serving strictly political purposes: a subordinate body whose function was to foster Nazi expansion and development. The SA's proper functions, in Hitler's view, were political ones such as protecting Nazi meetings from disruption by protesters, disrupting meetings of Nazi adversaries, distributing propaganda, recruiting, marching in the streets to propagandize by showing support for the Nazi cause, political campaigning, and brawling with Communist Party and its Rotfrontkämpferbund in the streets. Hitler did not advocate the SA's functioning as a military or paramilitary organization, which would contradict his announced "policy of legality" since the failed Beer Hall Putsch in 1923 in which the Nazis would obtain power through purely legal means.

Many in the SA itself — including the leadership — held a contrary, and more glorious, view of the SA's role. To them, the SA was a nascent military organization: the basis for a future citizen army on the Napoleonic model, an army which would, ideally, absorb the Reichswehr and displace its "outmoded" Prussian concepts with "modern" Nazi ideals.

=== 1928 and 1930 elections ===
The Reichstag elections in 1928 were a disaster for the Nazi Party, winning just 12 seats out of a total of 491 with less than 3% of the popular vote, becoming the ninth-largest party in parliament. Although the election saw losses for the political right and centre in general, the performance of the Nazi Party was so poor that some commentators believed that it was the beginning of the end for the Nazi movement. Some within the SA were energised as they believed Hitler might abandon his policy of obtaining power through strictly legal means. In March 1930, the Second Müller cabinet headed by Hermann Müller of the Social Democratic Party imploded over the issue of the amount of employer contributions to unemployment insurance, under pressure from the Great Depression. Its successor, the First Brüning cabinet headed by Heinrich Brüning of the Centre Party was unable to obtain a parliamentary majority for its own financial reform bill, which was rejected by the Reichstag on 16 July 1930.

Brüning asked President Paul von Hindenburg to invoke Article 48 in order to promulgate the bill as an emergency decree. Hindenburg did so and the Reichstag promptly repudiated the bill on 18 July 1930, thereby invalidating the presidential decree under the Weimar Constitution. Brüning thereupon asked Hindenburg to dissolve parliament and call for new elections, which were scheduled for 14 September 1930. This presented an opportunity for the Nazis to improve their representation in the Reichstag two years earlier than expected.

== SA demands of August 1930 ==
Members of the SA in Berlin, led by Walter Stennes, had for some time been voicing objections to the policies and purposes of the SA as defined by Hitler. These SA members saw their organization as a revolutionary vanguard of a National Socialist order that would overthrow the hated Weimar Republic by force. Stennes complained that advancement within the SA was improperly based upon cronyism and favoritism rather than upon merit, and objected to the general law-abiding approach. He and his men chafed under Hitler's order to terminate street attacks upon Communists and Jews, sarcastically referring to him as "Adolf Legalité."

The SA had developed a list of seven demands, including denunciations of capitalism and Catholicism, just before an election in a country with a substantial Catholic population; an end to corruption and the bureaucratization in the Nazi Party; the removal of Gauleiter power over SA men; the administration of SA independently from party administration; and a fixed monetary appropriation from party funds to be earmarked for the SA. On 7 August 1930, Joseph Goebbels, the Gauleiter (Nazi regional leader) of Berlin, met with Stennes and other SA officers in Berlin. The SA also wanted three secure places on the party's list for the upcoming Reichstag elections. In addition, Stennes complained that the SA members under his command were not being paid sufficiently.

On 7 August 1930, Goebbels met again with Stennes and other SA officers in Berlin. Stennes demanded three ballot slots and threatened a "palace revolution" otherwise, claiming that he would resign and take 80% of the Berlin SA (some 15,000 men) with him. Hitler had already heard the SA demands from Franz Pfeffer von Salomon, the SA's supreme commander, and had rejected the demands outright. Hitler told Pfeffer to "get lost" and called him a "mutineer." Hitler ignored the Stennes initiative and did not grant him an audience when Stennes came to Munich to try to meet with him. The request for the ballot slots was consistently denied.

On 27 August, Stennes threatened Goebbels again: he wanted the three Reichstag seats, more money for the SA, and more political power in the movement. Hitler again refused to take it seriously. Pfeffer had resigned by this time, and Hitler assured Goebbels he would send the SA chief of staff, Otto Wagener, to fix things in the SA.

=== First ransack ===
Stennes decided that action was needed to make a statement. On 30 August 1930, the Berlin SA refused to provide protection for Goebbels at his Sportpalast speech, and instead held a parade in Wittenbergplatz. Goebbels turned to the Schutzstaffel (SS), who provided the necessary security for the speech and then protected the office of the Berlin Gau on Hedemannstrasse. The SA then stormed the Gau office, injuring the SS men and wrecking the premises.

Goebbels was shocked at the extent of the damage and notified Hitler, who left the Wagner Festival in Bayreuth immediately and flew to Berlin. Hitler talked to Stennes and groups of SA the next day, urging them to follow his leadership. He redefined the issue in different and simpler terms: Was the SA entirely loyal to Hitler under the Führerprinzip, or not? On the following day, he convened a meeting of some 2,000 SA and announced he was personally taking over as Supreme Leader of the SA.

The SA cheered and were delighted that their leader was finally giving them the recognition they felt they deserved. Hitler had Stennes read a declaration increasing the SA's funding, and promised free legal representation for SA men arrested in the line of duty. A special levy of 20 pfennig would be made on party dues to pay for it.

The crisis was over for the time being. The SA members, it appeared, did not truly want to fight with Hitler nor contest his leadership, but only sought treatment that they considered correct in light of their mission and the overall mission of the NSDAP. However, Hitler's effort would not suffice to remove the underlying structural issue that conditioned the Party-SA relationship: What was the SA's role and, in particular, what would that role be if the party actually succeeded in gaining the political power it sought?

In the 1930 German federal election, the Nazi Party achieved an astonishing victory, winning 95 seats and 18% of the popular vote, becoming the second-largest party in the Reichstag.

== Spring 1931 ==
Hitler had made himself Supreme Commander of the SA, though he had no interest in running the organization. He summoned Ernst Röhm, who was in self-imposed exile in South America, and offered him effective command of the SA as its chief of staff. Röhm returned to Germany and promptly reorganized the SA, removing control of Silesia from Stennes. Meanwhile, Stennes continued to complain; he noted that the SA in Breslau were not able to turn out for inspection in February 1931 because they lacked footwear. He also complained about Röhm's return to run the SA, objecting to the Chief of Staff's homosexuality.

Even more troubling, the strategy of taking power by force was advocated by Stennes in February articles published in Der Angriff. This was disturbing to the Nazi leadership as it contravened Hitler's strategy of gaining power through constitutional means only and forswearing violence as a means to power. And Hitler had very publicly announced his "reliance on legality only" in the Leipzig trial of three young Reichswehr officers for "treasonous activities" in September 1930. This was in perfect timing for the autumn elections and with an eye towards the attendant propaganda value, and he had sworn on the witness stand and under oath that the party had forsaken violent and illegal means as a path to power.

On 20 February 1931, Hitler issued a decree making the SA subordinate to the party organization at the Gau level. Stennes mildly protested to Röhm by letter, raising also the plight of unemployed SA men. On 26 February, Röhm forbade the SA from taking part in street battles and also forbade its leaders from speaking in public.

On 28 March 1931, Brüning, employing Hindenburg's emergency powers under Article 48, issued an emergency decree requiring all political meetings to be registered and requiring all posters and political handouts to be subject to censorship. The decree also delegated wide powers to Brüning to curb "political excesses." Of course, the SA objected to the decree. Nevertheless, Hitler — whose "policy of legality" appeared to be paying dividends after the 1930 election — ordered strict compliance.

=== Second ransack ===
Stennes refused to obey Hitler's orders and rebelled again. On the night of March 31, the SA once again stormed the Berlin Gau offices and took physical control of them. In addition, the SA took over the offices of Der Angriff, with pro-Stennes versions of the newspaper appearing on 1 April and 2 April. Hitler instructed Goebbels to take whatever means were necessary to put down the revolt. This time, the Berlin Police were called to expel the SA intruders from the party's offices. Goebbels and Hermann Göring purged around 500 SA men in Berlin and the surrounding areas.

Since all money for SA was dispensed through the Gau headquarters, it was a simple matter to cut this off and the lack of funding caused the rebellion to collapse. In an article in the Völkischer Beobachter, Hitler justified Stennes' expulsion, referring to him as a "salon socialist" and demanding that all SA men choose between Stennes and Hitler, declaring that the mutinous Stennes was a conspirator against National Socialism. The Nazi Party leadership appeared to have regained control over the SA.

== Aftermath ==
The Stennes revolt was defeated but the underlying structural problems within the SA simply remained dormant for several years. The inherent tensions between the party and SA only grew under the able leadership of Röhm, whose ambitions were higher than those of Stennes. The revolt illustrated Hitler's consistent approach to solving intraparty frictions: resorting to the Führerprinzip rather than address the underlying problems which motivated the tension. A resolution to the dilemma had to wait until the Reichswehr forced the issue in the summer of 1934 when, with the SA growing restless and Hindenburg on his deathbed, Hitler responded with the murderous Night of the Long Knives.

Stennes had a following among the leftist oriented SA in Berlin, Pomerania, Mecklenburg, and Silesia, founding the National Socialist Fighting League of Germany (Nationalsozialistische Kampfbewegung Deutschlands). He made connection with Otto Strasser, as well as Hermann Ehrhardt, ex-leader of the defunct Viking League (Bund Wiking). He recruited about 2,000 SA men from Berlin and elsewhere along with 2,000 Ehrhardt followers, and the leaders protested that the "NSDAP has abandoned the revolutionary course of true national socialism" and will become "just another coalition party."

Stennes left Germany in 1933, working as a military adviser to Chiang Kai-shek in China. In 1949, he returned years after the fall of the Nazi regime.

Hitler was impressed by the SS and demonstrated his confidence in them by replacing Stennes with an SS man, Wilhelm Kruger.

Conservative businessmen gained more confidence in Hitler after seeing the repression of the more radical Stennes element and Hitler's attendant adherence to "legality." As Collier notes:

Ironically the Stennes revolt may have assisted the Nazi rise to power, in that more moderate elements in the German right observed Hitler's adherence to his strategy of legality and gained confidence that he was accordingly "law-abiding."

Hitler wrote an article in the Volkischer Beobachter condemning Stennes as a "salon socialist" and claiming that he was rebelling against National Socialism. In 1934, Stennes sued Hitler for libel after an article in Der Angriff claimed that Stennes was a police spy who had infiltrated the Nazi Party. The case was almost impossible for Stennes to win.

Stennes' attempted coup strengthened the SS's position within the party. The elite corps remained as one man behind Hitler and even fought against their SA comrades. However, the SS remained part of the SA. Hitler was delighted with the SS's support and even claimed that the victory over Stennes was thanks to them. The SS remained loyal to its Führer and its slogan became Meine Ehre heißt Treue - My honor is loyalty.

According to Heinrich Himmler, appointed to Reichsführer-SS in 1929, his men were members of the elite troops, the SA members were just ordinary soldiers. Himmler's appointment was a major change in the SS. Under his fanatical leadership, the organization developed into a comprehensive organization with tentacles that reached every corner of Nazi policy.

== In popular culture ==
Stennes, played by Hanno Koffler, and his 1931 revolt are depicted in season 4 of Babylon Berlin.
