= Julius Schreck =

Nazi officer, first commander of the SS (1898–1936)

- Schreck in 1933

1st Reichsführer-SS
- In office 4 April 1925 – 15 April 1926
- Leader: Adolf Hitler
- Preceded by: Office established
- Succeeded by: Joseph Berchtold

Personal details
- Born: 13 July 1898 Munich, Kingdom of Bavaria, German Empire
- Died: 16 May 1936 (aged 37) Munich, Bavaria, Germany
- Party: Nazi Party

Military service
- Allegiance: German Empire
- Branch/service: Imperial German Army
- Battles/wars: World War I

Julius Schreck (13 July 1898 – 16 May 1936) was a German Nazi official and close confidant of Adolf Hitler. Born in Munich, Schreck served in World War I and shortly afterwards joined right-wing paramilitary units. He joined the Nazi Party in 1920 and was a founding member of the Sturmabteilung ("Storm Detachment"; SA). Later in 1925, he became the first leader of the Schutzstaffel ("Protection Squadron"; SS). He then served for a time as a chauffeur for Hitler. Schreck developed meningitis in 1936 and died on 16 May of that year. Hitler gave him a state funeral.

== Early life ==
Julius Schreck was born on 13 July 1898 in Munich in Bavaria. He served in the German Army during World War I. After the war ended, Schreck became an early member of the National Socialist German Workers' Party (Nazi Party; NSDAP), having joined in 1920 and documented as member No. 53. Schreck developed a friendship with the party's leader Adolf Hitler during its early years.

== Career in the SA ==
Schreck was a founding member of the Sturmabteilung ("Storm Detachment"; SA), being involved in its growth and development. The SA was a paramilitary wing of the party designed to disrupt political opponents and provide muscle for security tasks. Hitler, in early 1923, ordered the formation of a small separate bodyguard dedicated to his service and protection rather than an uncontrolled mass of the party, such as the SA. Originally the unit was composed of only eight men, commanded by Schreck and Joseph Berchtold. It was designated the Stabswache ("Staff Guard"). The Stabswache were issued unique badges, but at this point the Stabswache was still under the control of the SA, whose membership continued to increase. Schreck resurrected the use of the Totenkopf ("death's head") as the unit's insignia, a symbol various elite forces had used in the past, including specialized assault troops of Imperial Germany in World War I who used Hutier infiltration tactics.

In May 1923, the unit was renamed Stoßtrupp-Hitler ("Shock Troop-Hitler"). The unit was solely responsible for Hitler's protection. On 9 November 1923 the Stoßtrupp, along with the SA and several other paramilitary units, took part in the Beer Hall Putsch in Munich. The plan was to seize control of the city in a coup d'état and then challenge the government in Berlin. The putsch was quickly crushed by the local police. In the aftermath of the failed putsch both Hitler, Schreck, and other Nazi leaders were incarcerated for treason at Landsberg Prison. The Nazi Party and all associated formations, including the Stoßtrupp, were disbanded.

== Career in the SS ==
After Hitler's release from prison on 20 December 1924, the Nazi Party was officially refounded. In 1925, Hitler ordered Schreck to organise the formation of a new bodyguard unit, the Schutzkommando ("Protection Command"). Hitler wanted a small group of tough ex-soldiers such as Schreck, who would be loyal to him. The unit included old Stoßtrupp members such as Emil Maurice and Erhard Heiden. The unit made its first public appearance in April 1925. That same year, the Schutzkommando was expanded to a national level. It was also successively renamed the Sturmstaffel ("Storm Squadron") and then finally the Schutzstaffel ("Protection Squadron"; SS) on 9 November 1925. Schreck became SS member #5. He was asked by Hitler to command the bodyguard company. Schreck never referred to himself as Reichsführer-SS, but the title was retrospectively applied to him in later years.

In 1926, Schreck stood down as commander of the SS and Berchtold took over. Berchtold changed the title of the office position, which became known as the Reichsführer-SS. Schreck remained on the SS rolls as an SS-Führer and worked as Hitler's private chauffeur after Maurice until 1934. In 1930, after the SS had begun to expand under Heinrich Himmler, Schreck was appointed an SS-Standartenführer but had little actual power. He continued to serve at Hitler's side and they were on very good terms.

== Death ==
Schreck continued as Hitler's personal driver until 1936. That spring Schreck developed meningitis and died on 16 May in Munich. He was a well-liked man and Hitler was distraught when Schreck died. His final rank was SS-Brigadeführer, a rank equivalent to that of a Generalmajor in the Wehrmacht. Schreck was accorded a Nazi state funeral. Himmler referred to him as "Adolf Hitler's first SS man".

Government offices
Preceded by Office established	Reich Leader of the SS; 1925–1926	Succeeded by Joseph Berchtold
