= Erhard Heiden =

Member of the Nazi Party and third commander of the Schutzstaffel

3rd Reichsführer-SS
- In office 1 March 1927 – 6 January 1929
- Deputy: Heinrich Himmler
- Leader: Adolf Hitler
- Preceded by: Joseph Berchtold
- Succeeded by: Heinrich Himmler

Personal details
- Born: 23 February 1901 Weiler-Simmerberg, German Empire
- Died: 19 March 1933 (aged 32) Germany
- Cause of death: Execution by shooting
- Party: Nazi Party

Erhard Heiden (23 February 1901 – 19 March 1933) was an early member of the Nazi Party and the third commander of the Schutzstaffel (SS), the paramilitary wing of the Sturmabteilung ("Storm Detachment; SA"). He was appointed head of the SS, an elite subsection of the SA in 1927. At that time the SS numbered fewer than a thousand men and Heiden found it difficult to cope under the much larger SA. Heiden was not a success in the post, and SS membership dropped significantly under his leadership. He was dismissed from his post in 1929, officially for "family reasons". He was arrested after the Nazis came to national power in 1933 and executed that same year.

== Life ==
Heiden was born on 23 February 1901 in Weiler-Simmerberg, a city in Bavaria. In 1917, he attended the NCO school in Fürstenfeldbruck. Little is known about his early life.

Following Germany's defeat in World War I, hyperinflation, mass unemployment, poverty, crime and civil unrest plagued the country. During that time, Heiden served in a Freikorps unit. Also in 1919, a small right-wing political party known as the German Workers' Party (DAP) was created and seated in Munich. In 1920, it changed its name to the National Socialist German Workers' Party (Nazi Party; NSDAP). It rejected the terms of the Treaty of Versailles and advocated antisemitism and anti-Bolshevism.

At party meetings in late 1919 and early 1920, hecklers and protesters tried to disrupt Adolf Hitler's speeches and fought with party members. It was decided that a permanent group of party members would serve to protect Nazi officials at rallies and disrupt the meetings of opposing parties. The basis for the Sturmabteilung ("Storm Detachment"; SA) had been formed. Heiden became an early member of the Nazi Party and the SA. In 1923, Heiden joined a small personal bodyguard unit for Adolf Hitler named Stoßtrupp-Hitler ("Shock Troop–Hitler").

That same year, Hitler felt strong enough to try to seize power in Munich. Inspired by Benito Mussolini's "March on Rome" the previous year, the Nazis aimed to first establish power in Munich and then challenge the government in Berlin. On 9 November 1923, the Stoßtrupp, along with the SA and several other paramilitary units, took part in the abortive coup d'état, resulting in the death of sixteen Nazi supporters and four police officers, an event known as the Beer Hall Putsch. After the putsch, Hitler and other Nazi leaders were incarcerated at Landsberg Prison for high treason. The Nazi Party and all associated formations, including the Stoßtrupp, were officially disbanded.

== Career in the SS ==
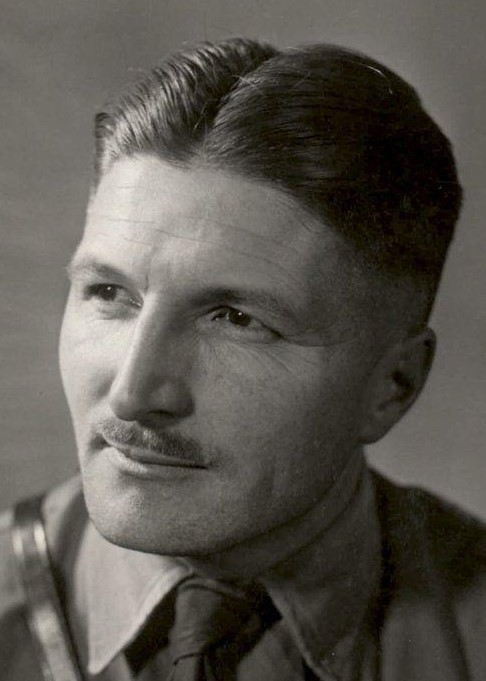
Berchtold, the predecessor to Heiden as head of the SS

After Hitler's release from prison in December 1924, the Nazi Party was officially refounded. In 1925, Hitler ordered the formation of a new bodyguard unit, the Schutzkommando ("Protection Command; SS"). It was formed by Julius Schreck and included old Stoßtrupp members such as Emil Maurice and Heiden. That same year, the Schutzkommando was expanded and renamed the Sturmstaffel ("Storm Squadron"), and finally the Schutzstaffel ("Protection Squadron"; SS). Heiden, described by William Shirer as "a former police stool-pigeon of unsavory reputation", joined the SS in 1925 and was an early advocate of separating the unit from the SA, its parent organization.

On 1 March 1927, Joseph Berchtold transferred leadership of the SS to Heiden, who was his acting deputy. Berchtold had become disillusioned by the SA's authority over the SS. As head of the SS, Heiden also found it difficult to function under the larger and more powerful SA. Under Heiden's leadership a stricter code of discipline was enforced than would have been tolerated in the SA ranks. Heiden further demanded that the men under his command were not to be involved in party matters which were none of their concern. His intention was to create a small elite unit and obtain higher quality recruits.

Except for the Munich area, the unit was unable to maintain any momentum. The membership of the SS declined from 1,000 to 280 as the SS continued to struggle under the SA. As Heiden attempted to keep the small group from dissolving, Heinrich Himmler became his deputy in September 1927. Himmler had a great enthusiasm and vision for the SS and displayed good organisational abilities which Heiden used. Himmler became the driving force within the SS and in time eclipsed Heiden.

Upon the dismissal of Heiden, Himmler assumed the position of Reichsführer-SS with Hitler's approval in January 1929. (Note: At that time Reichsführer-SS was only a titled position, not an actual SS rank.McNab 2009, pp. 18, 29.) There are differing accounts of the reason for this dismissal. The party merely announced that it was for "family reasons". It was also suggested at the time that the dismissal was due to Heiden associating with Jews. Starting in 1928, Heiden was co-owner of a clothing supply business that sold uniforms to the SS. Another company in Munich supplied Heiden and his partner with the pants, which were used for the SS uniforms. It was discovered that this other company was owned by a Jew. Further, it was alleged that Heiden had been making large profits on the clothing sales to the SS for uniforms. This led to Heiden having to resign as head of the SS. Historian Adrian Weale believes the primary reason for his dismissal was due to him being ineffective in the job. There were also rumors that he was a police informer. Himmler's biographer, Peter Longerich, says that beyond the official announcement, "we have no further clues to explain either Heiden's dismissal or Himmler's appointment". Under Himmler, the SS greatly expanded over time, with his ultimate aim being to turn it into the most powerful organization in Germany.

=== Death ===
In March 1933, after a visit to his friend Emil Maurice, Heiden was arrested by members of the Sicherheitsdienst ("Security Service"; SD) while he was having dinner in the Orlando coffee house in Munich. He was murdered sometime later, presumably by members of the SD.

Heiden was officially listed as missing on 18 March 1933. On 28 March 1933, Paul Schulz wrote the following about Heiden's disappearance:

"Today I find out that some time ago (14 days) the former SS leader Hayden [sic] disappeared. In the evening he was visiting his friend Maurice and went from there to his apartment, which is only a few houses away. On the way he visited a pub nearby, drank his beer and ate alone. After a while, an SA man came and asked to speak to him, asking him to come outside. Since that time he has not returned. After half an hour this SA man came again and fetched Hayden's coat and hat. Hayden left without a coat or hat and without paying."

Shortly after Heiden's disappearance, Heiden's mother asked his old friend Maurice to look for him. He turned to Josef Gerum for help, who finally went with August Schneidhuber to see Himmler about the disappearance. When Gerum and Schneidhuber asked him about Heiden's whereabouts, Himmler, Gerum later claimed, reacted "out of temper" and forbade any interference. According to Schulz, at the end of March an SS-Sturmfuhrer told Maurice that if he said another word about the Heiden affair or made any further inquiries into his whereabouts, he was a "goner". When Maurice raised the incident with Hitler, Hitler recommended that he withdraw from Munich for a while.

Heiden's body was discovered months later, on 13 August 1933, in the Neufinsing works canal near Erding (according to the Erding district court) and buried on 15 September. According to Karl Ortner, his body had a gunshot wound to the head. The probable date of death was officially set as 19 March 1933.

== See also ==
- Karl Hanke

Government offices
Preceded by Joseph Berchtold	Reich Leader of the SS; 1927–1929	Succeeded by Heinrich Himmler
