= Stoßtrupp-Hitler =

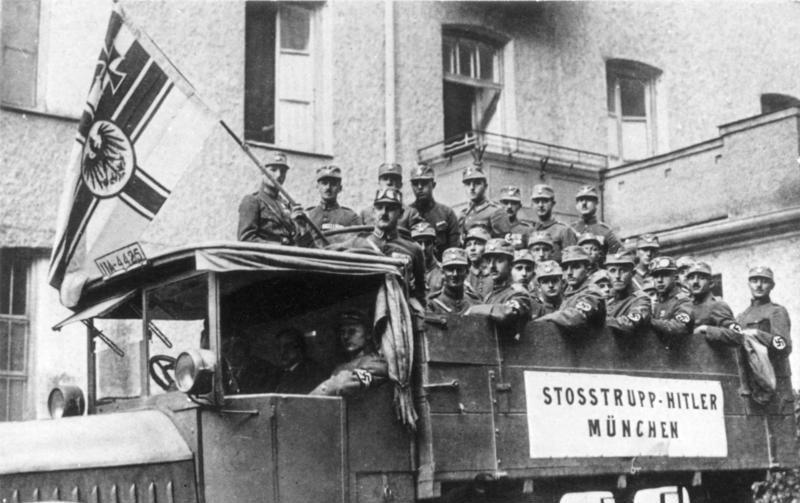
- Stoßtrupp men embark for a rally in 1923
- Active: May–November 1923
- Country: Germany
- Allegiance: Nazi Party
- Role: Bodyguard
- Patron: Adolf Hitler
- Engagements: Beer Hall Putsch

Commanders
- Notable commanders: Julius Schreck; Joseph Berchtold

Stoßtrupp-Hitler (German for "Shock-Troop-Hitler") was a short-lived bodyguard unit formed especially for the protection of Nazi Party leader Adolf Hitler in 1923. It was dedicated to his service alone. Notable members included Rudolf Hess, Julius Schreck, Joseph Berchtold, Emil Maurice, Erhard Heiden, Ulrich Graf, and Bruno Gesche. It was under the control of Hitler and was involved in the Beer Hall Putsch of November 1923. It served as a predecessor of the Schutzstaffel (SS).

== History ==
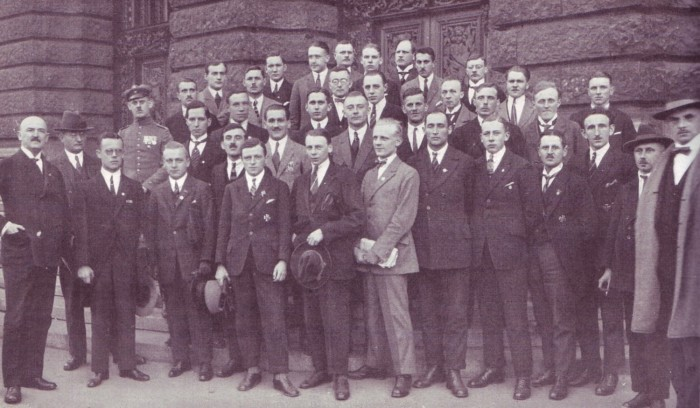
The defendants in the trial against 40 members of the Stoßtrupp-Adolf-Hitler in April 1924.

In the earliest days of the Nazi Party, the leadership realized that a bodyguard unit composed of zealous and reliable men was needed. Ernst Röhm formed a guard formation from the 19.Granatwerfer-Kompanie; from this formation the Sturmabteilung (SA) soon evolved. In early 1923, Adolf Hitler ordered a separate small bodyguard unit to be formed. It was dedicated to his service rather than "a suspect mass" of the party, such as the SA. Originally, the unit was composed of only eight men, commanded by Julius Schreck and Joseph Berchtold. It was designated the Stabswache (staff guard). The Stabswache were issued unique badges, but at this point the Stabswache was still under overall SA control. Schreck resurrected the use of the Totenkopf as the unit's insignia, a symbol various elite forces had used throughout the Prussian kingdom and the later German Empire.

In May 1923, the unit was renamed Stoßtrupp-Hitler and at the time numbered no more than 20 members, all of whom were considered Hitler loyalists. According to the Historical Lexicon of Bavaria, the unit later had around 100 members, many recruited from the disbanding Freikorps.

On 9 November 1923, the Stoßtrupp-Hitler, along with the SA and several other Nazi paramilitary units, took part in the abortive Beer Hall Putsch in Munich. In the aftermath, Hitler was imprisoned and his party, and all associated formations, including the Stoßtrupp-Hitler, were disbanded. Members of the unit were tried for their part in the Beer Hall Putsch, with 38 members being sentenced to imprisonment at Landsberg Prison.

== Forerunner of the SS ==
In 1925, after the Nazi Party and SA were re-established, Hitler ordered Schreck to organise a new bodyguard unit, the Schutzkommando (Protection Command). It was tasked with providing personal protection for Hitler at party functions and events. That same year, the Schutzkommando was expanded to a national organisation and renamed successively the Sturmstaffel (Storm Squadron), and finally the Schutzstaffel (Protection Squad; SS). Officially, the SS marked its foundation on 9 November 1925, the second anniversary of the Beer Hall Putsch.

== Notable members ==
- Rudolf Hess
- Julius Schreck
- Joseph Berchtold
- Emil Maurice
- Erhard Heiden
- Ulrich Graf
- Bruno Gesche
- Christian Weber
- Karl Fiehler
- Walter Buch
- Hermann Fobke
- Karl Laforce
- Wilhelm Laforce
- Josef Gerum
- Hans Kallenbach
- Philipp Kitzinger
- Alois Rosenwink

== See also ==
- Schutzstaffel
- Führerbegleitkommando
- Adolf Hitler's bodyguard
