= Hans Ulrich Klintzsch =

German SA commander (1898–1959)

- Born: Johann Ulrich Klintzsch; 4 November 1898; Lübbenau, German Empire
- Died: 17 August 1959 (aged 60); Hamburg, West Germany
- Military career
- Allegiance: German Empire; Weimar Republic; Nazi Germany
- Branch: Imperial German Navy; Reichsmarine; Luftwaffe
- Service years: 1916–1919; 1920–1921; 1936–1945
- Rank: Fähnrich zur See (Imperial German Navy); Oberleutnant zur See (Reichsmarine); Oberst (Luftwaffe)
- Known for: Oberster SA-Führer

Johann "Hans" Ulrich Klintzsch (4 November 1898 – 17 August 1959) was a German Imperial German Navy officer during the First World War who was a member of multiple right-wing paramilitary organizations during the Weimar Republic, including the Marinebrigade Ehrhardt, the Organisation Consul and the Viking League. He became an early member of the Nazi Party, and Adolf Hitler appointed him as the Oberster SA-Führer of the paramilitary Sturmabteilung (SA), which he led between 1921 and 1923. He later served in the Luftwaffe from 1936 until the end of the Second World War.

== Early life ==
Klintzsch was born in Lübbenau in the Prussian Province of Brandenburg, the son of a pastor. After completing secondary school at the age of 18, he entered the Imperial German Navy in October 1916 and served until the end of the First World War. He served on a torpedo boat, in a marine artillery regiment and as a watch officer aboard a destroyer. After Germany's defeat, he joined the Marinebrigade Ehrhardt–a Freikorps unit of the early Weimar Republic that had been formed from members of the former navy by Hermann Ehrhardt–with the rank of Oberleutnant. Between October 1920 and June 1921, he returned to active service with the Reichsmarine and left with the rank of Leutnant zur See. He then moved to Munich to pursue the study of law and public policy, and enrolled in the Technical University of Munich but only attended two terms and left without graduating. Over the summer months, he attended many meetings of the Nazi Party and later testified that: "The ideas championed there mesmerized me to an extent that I have virtually limited my studies to the learning of the matters covered there. I very much devoted myself to questions dealing with the Jews and the Freemasons."

== Nazi and SA career ==
In Munich, Klintzsch joined the Nazi Party on 20 July 1921 (membership number 3,603). On 29 July, Hermann Ehrhardt met Adolf Hitler and agreed to delegate Klintzsch to became a training coordinator of the euphemistically named "gymnastics and sports department", which was actually a front organization for the fledgling Sturmabteilung, the Party's paramilitary unit. In September 1921, Klintzsch was briefly detained under the suspicion of involvement in the murder of Matthias Erzberger, a Centre Party politician who was killed by two members of the right-wing terrorist group Organisation Consul, a group that Klintzsch belonged to from August 1921 to May 1923. After his release from custody, Hitler appointed him to succeed Emil Maurice as the Oberster SA-Führer, the supreme commander of the now renamed Sturmabteilung (SA). Klintzsch held the position from November 1921 through February 1923. He was replaced by Hermann Göring due to a growing estrangement between Hitler and Erhardt. Klintzsch briefly remained a member of the SA high command as Göring's chief of staff but resigned in May.

Klintzsch returned to the Marinebrigade Ehrhardt as a battalion commander and also served in a leadership role in the Viking League, the successor organization of the now-banned Organisation Consul. In 1927, legal proceedings were initiated against him in the Berlin Landgericht for his continued activities with the now-banned Viking League. The legal case was ultimately dismissed in 1929 by a Reich amnesty law.

== Luftwaffe service in the Second World War ==
After his career as SA leader, Klintzsch returned to civilian life. In 1935, the Nazi Party began offering fast-track promotions to former military officers who had left the service due to the severe reduction of the armed forces mandated by the Treaty of Versailles. Klintzsch was reactivated as a Major in the Luftwaffe in 1936. He served as the commander of an aircraft pilot school until the outbreak of the Second World War in 1939. After serving for nearly one year at the Reich Aviation Ministry, he became the commander of a Luftwaffe sea rescue unit in August 1940. In June 1941, he was advanced to commander of the Sea Rescue Service – West, based in Cherbourg until December 1942 when he was assigned to the Luftwaffe general staff as Inspector of Sea Rescue Services. Promoted to Oberst in February 1943, he became the commander of Fliegelführer 6 in Luftflotte 6 in March 1945, serving in this post until the end of the war.

In the post-war years, Klintzsch is said to have aspired to become a pastor, and he worked as a catechist of the Protestant faith at Schorndorf from 1949 to 1952. He died during the wedding of his son Frithjof in 1959.

== Decorations and awards ==
- 1914 Iron Cross 2nd class and 1st class
- Silesian Eagle (1921)
- The Honour Cross of the World War 1914/1918 (1934)

== Sources ==
- Miller, Michael D.; Schulz, Andreas (2015). Leaders of the Storm Troops. Vol. 1. Solihull, England: Helion & Company. ISBN 978-1-909-98287-1.
- Siemens, Daniel (2017). Stormtroopers: A New History of Hitler's Brownshirts. New Haven: Yale University Press. ISBN 978-0-300-19681-8.

Political offices
Preceded by Emil Maurice	Supreme SA Leader; 1921–1923	Succeeded by Hermann Göring
