= Emil Maurice =

Hitler's first personal chauffeur (1897–1972)

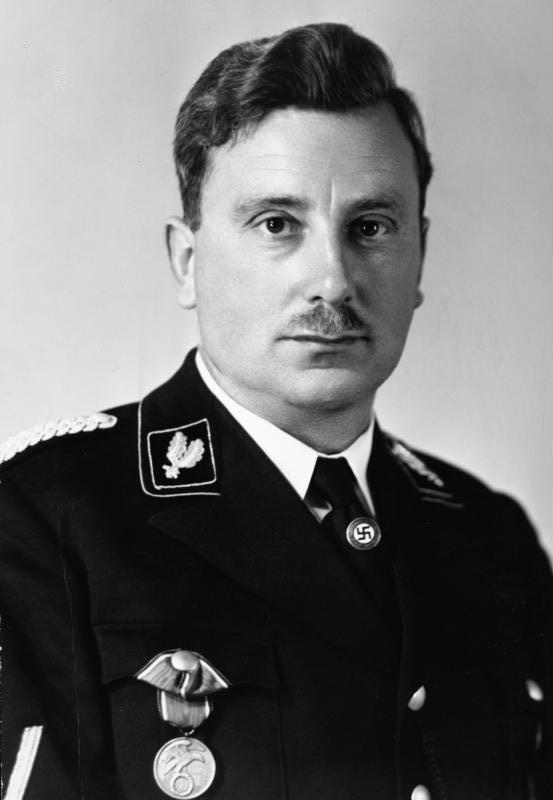
- Maurice wearing the Blood Order medal

Oberster SA-Führer
- In office 1920–1921
- Preceded by: Office established
- Succeeded by: Hans Ulrich Klintzsch

Personal details
- Born: 19 January 1897 Westermoor, German Empire
- Died: 6 February 1972 (aged 75) Munich, West Germany
- Spouse: Hedwig Maria Anna Ploetz (m. 1935)
- Occupation: Personal chauffeur for Adolf Hitler; Reichstag deputy

Military service
- Allegiance: Nazi Germany
- Branch/service: Schutzstaffel; Luftwaffe
- Years of service: 1919–1945
- Rank: SS-Oberführer
- Battles/wars: World War II

Emil Maurice (German pronunciation: [ˈeːmiːl moˈʁiːs]; 19 January 1897 – 6 February 1972) was a German Nazi official and a founding member of the Schutzstaffel (SS). He was Adolf Hitler's first personal chauffeur, and one of only a few people of mixed Jewish and ethnic German ancestry to serve in the SS.

Maurice had no Jewish parents nor grandparents, and was thus considered a German and not classified as Jewish or Mischling under the Nuremberg Laws; nonetheless, one of his great-grandfathers (1805–1896) was Jewish, and the more racially stringent SS required officers to prove Aryan ancestry back to 1750. Accordingly, he was given the status of 'Honorary Aryan' by Hitler.

== Early life and association with Hitler ==
A watchmaker by trade, Maurice was a close early associate of Adolf Hitler; their personal friendship dated back to 1919 when they were both members of the German Workers' Party (DAP). Maurice officially joined the DAP on 1 December 1919 and his party number was 594 (the count began at 501). With the founding of the Sturmabteilung (SA) in 1920, Maurice became the first Oberster SA-Führer ('supreme SA leader'). Maurice led the SA stormtroopers in some fights with other groups during those early days. Hitler included the dedication "to my magnificent Maurice" in his book Mein Kampf , and also mentions one fight in particular from November 1921 where Maurice was at the forefront of the SA unit during the fighting.

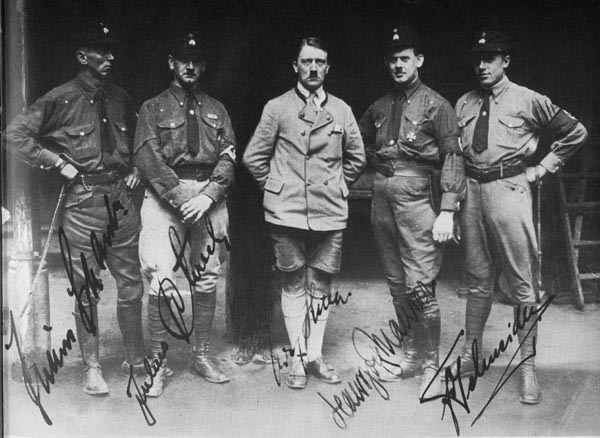
Early photo of Hitler's bodyguard: left to right: Julius Schaub; Julius Schreck; Emil Maurice (crudely scratched out after Hitler sacked him over his relationship with Geli Raubal); Adolf Hitler; Hans Georg Maurer; Gerhard Schneider

In July 1921, Maurice became a personal chauffeur for Adolf Hitler. In March 1923, Maurice also became a member of the Stabswache ('staff guard'), a small separate bodyguard dedicated to Hitler's service rather than "a suspect mass" of the party, such as the SA. It was given the task of guarding Hitler at Nazi parties and rallies. In May 1923, the unit was renamed Stoßtrupp ('shock troop') 'Adolf Hitler'. Maurice, Julius Schreck, Joseph Berchtold, and Erhard Heiden, were all members of the Stoßtrupp. On 9 November 1923, the Stoßtrupp, along with the SA and several other paramilitary units, took part in the abortive Beer Hall Putsch in Munich. In the aftermath of the putsch, Hitler, Rudolf Hess, Maurice and other Nazi leaders were incarcerated at Landsberg prison for high treason. It was during this time that Maurice was the original transcriber of Hitler's Mein Kampf, before Hess assumed that duty after his arrival at Landsberg prison. The Nazi Party and all associated formations, including the Stoßtrupp, were officially disbanded.

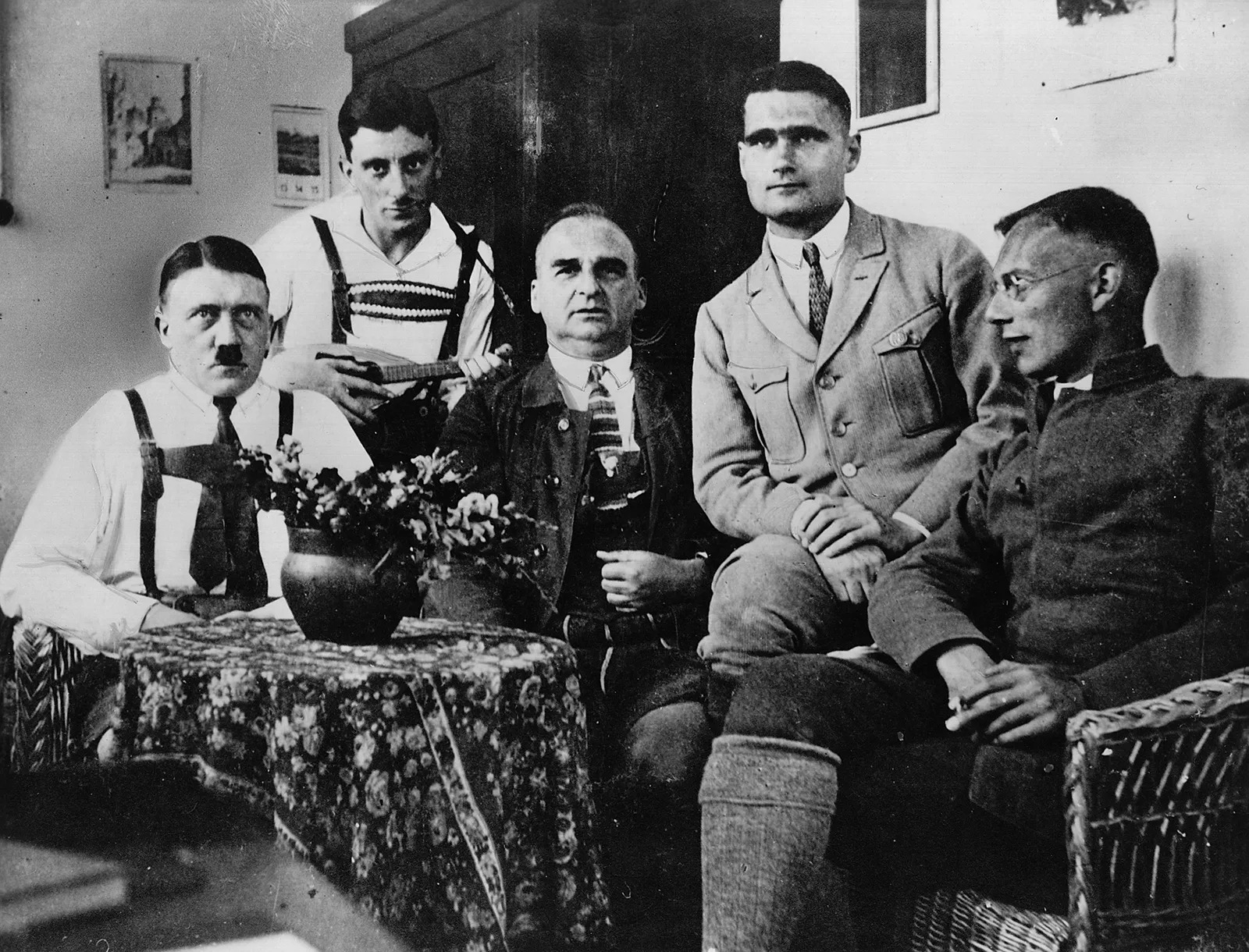
From left to right; Hitler, Maurice, Kriebel, Hess and Weber in Landsberg prison, 1924

After Hitler's release from prison, the Nazi Party was officially refounded. In 1925, Hitler ordered the formation of a new bodyguard unit, the Schutzkommando ('protection command'). It was formed by Schreck and included old Stoßtrupp members Maurice and Heiden. That same year, the Schutzkommando was expanded to a national level. It was renamed successively the Sturmstaffel ('storm squadron'), and finally on 9 November the Schutzstaffel ('protection squadron', abbreviated to SS). Hitler became SS member number 1 and Emil Maurice became SS member number 2. At that time, Maurice became an SS-Führer in the new organization, although the leadership of the SS was assumed by Schreck, the first German. Maurice became Hitler's permanent chauffeur in 1925. In December 1927, when Maurice informed Hitler that he was having a relationship with Hitler's half-niece Geli Raubal, Hitler forced an end to the affair. Maurice was dismissed from Hitler's personal service in 1928, but allowed to remain a member of the SS. As chauffeur, he was succeeded first by Schreck and then Erich Kempka.

When the SS was reorganized and expanded in 1932, Maurice became a senior SS officer and would eventually be promoted to the rank SS-Oberführer. While Maurice never became a top commander of the SS, his status as SS member number 2 effectively credited him as an actual founder of the organization. Heinrich Himmler, who ultimately would become the most recognized leader of the SS, was SS member number 168.

== Conflict with Heinrich Himmler over Jewish heritage ==
After Himmler had become Reichsführer-SS, Maurice fell afoul of Himmler's "racial purity" rules for SS officers when he had to submit details of his family history before he was allowed to marry in 1935. Himmler stated, "without question...Maurice is, according to his ancestral table, not of Aryan descent". All SS officers had to prove racial purity back to 1750, and it was discovered that Maurice had one-eighth Jewish ancestry; Chéri Maurice (1805–1896), the founder of the Thalia Theater in Hamburg, was his great-grandfather.

Even though Maurice had been a party member since 1919, taken part in the abortive Beer Hall Putsch (for which he was awarded the prestigious Blood Order), and been a bodyguard for Hitler, Himmler considered him to be a serious security risk given his "Jewish ancestry". Himmler recommended that Maurice be expelled from the SS, along with other members of his family. To Himmler's annoyance, Hitler stood by his old friend. In a secret letter written on 31 August 1935, Hitler compelled Himmler to make an exception for Maurice and his brothers, who were informally declared 'honorary aryans' and allowed to stay in the SS.

== Later life ==
Maurice became engaged on 31 March 1935 to the medical student, later doctor, Hedwig Maria Anna Ploetz, the daughter of Colonel Rudolf Ploetz. They married on 5 November 1935 in Munich. At the March 1936 parliamentary election, he became a Reichstag deputy for electoral constituency 29 (Leipzig) and retained this seat until the fall of the Nazi regime. From 1937, he was the chairman of the Munich Chamber of Commerce. From 1940 to 1942, he served in the Luftwaffe as an officer.

On 25 May 1945, American forces captured Maurice in Starnberg. In 1948, he was tried and sentenced to four years in a labour camp as a category II Nazi ('Offender'). Upon release he returned to his life as a watchmaker, and in 1951 owned a watch shop in Munich. He died in Starnberg on 6 February 1972.

== Decorations and awards ==
- Coburg Badge, October 1932
- Golden Party Badge, 1933
- Blood Order #495, 1933
- SS-Ehrenring, 1933
- SS-Ehrendegen, 1933
- Honour Chevron for the Old Guard, February 1934
- SS Ehrendolch ('SS honour dagger')
- War Merit Cross without swords
- Nazi Party Long Service Award in Bronze, Silver and Gold

Political offices
| New office | Supreme SA Leader; 1920–1921 | Succeeded by Hans Ulrich Klintzsch |
