= Supreme SA Leader =

Head of the original paramilitary wing of the Nazi Party

- Oberster SA-Führer

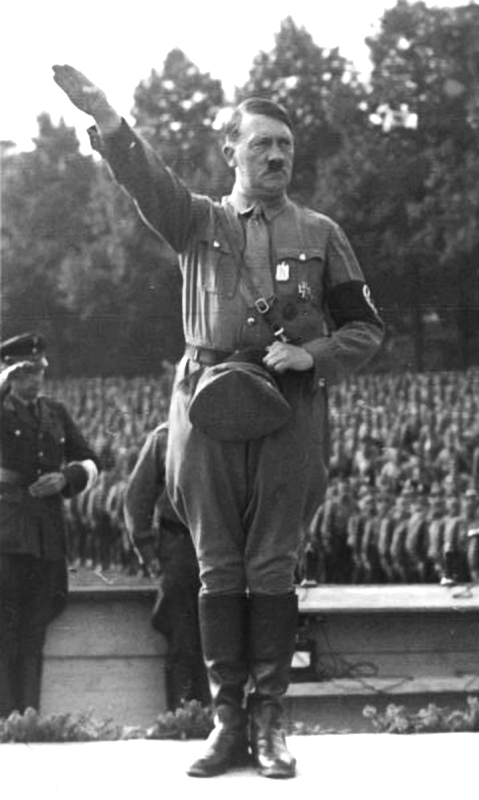
- Longest serving Adolf Hitler; 2 September 1930 – 30 April 1945 (pictured in 1933)
- Sturmabteilung
- Abbreviation: SA
- Member of: Oberste SA-Führung
- Reports to: Adolf Hitler
- Appointer: Adolf Hitler
- Term length: Not fixed
- Formation: February 1920
- First holder: Emil Maurice
- Final holder: Adolf Hitler
- Abolished: 30 April 1945
- Deputy: Stabschef

The supreme SA leader (German: Oberster SA-Führer), was the titular head of the Nazi Party's paramilitary group, the Sturmabteilung (SA).

== History ==
The Sturmabteilung (SA) was the original paramilitary organisation under Adolf Hitler and the Nazi Party of Germany. It played a significant role in Hitler's rise to power in the 1920s and early 1930s. Its primary purposes were providing protection for Nazi rallies and assemblies, disrupting the meetings of opposing parties, fighting against the paramilitary units of the opposing parties, especially the Roter Frontkämpferbund of the Communist Party of Germany (KPD) and the Reichsbanner Schwarz-Rot-Gold of the Social Democratic Party of Germany (SPD), and intimidating Romani, trade unionists, and especially Jews. To centralise the loyalty of the SA, Hitler personally assumed command of the entire organisation in 1930 and remained Oberster SA-Führer for the duration of the group's existence. After 1931, those who held the rank of Stabschef (Chief of staff), such as Ernst Röhm, were accepted as the commanders of the SA.

=== Insignia ===
The Oberster SA-Führer had no particular uniform insignia and was a paramilitary title that could be denoted in a variety of ways. Hermann Göring, for instance, created an elaborate uniform, with swastika armband accompanied with white service stripes. In contrast, Maurice wore simply a brown Nazi storm trooper shirt with no insignia, as did Hitler when he held the title of Oberster SA-Führer.

== Office holders ==
No.	Portrait	Oberster SA-Führer	Took office	Left office	Time in office	Party	Ref.
1	Emil Maurice	Emil Maurice (1897–1972)	February 1920	August 1921	1 year, 6 months	NSDAP	
2	Hans Ulrich Klintzsch	Hans Ulrich Klintzsch (1898–1959)	October 1921	February 1923	1 year, 4 months	NSDAP	
3	Hermann Göring	Hermann Göring (1893–1946)	1 March 1923	November 1923	9 months	NSDAP	
None (November 1923 – 1 November 1926) (Note: The NSDAP and its organs and instruments (including the Völkischer Beobachter and the SA) were banned in Bavaria (and other parts of Germany) following Hitler's abortive attempt to overthrow the Weimar Republic in the Beer Hall Putsch in November 1923. The Bavarian ban was lifted in February 1925 after Hitler pledged to adhere to legal and constitutional means in his quest for political power. See Verbotzeit. Though charged with the leadership of the SA in August 1926, Pfeffer von Salomon was not formally appointed Oberster SA-Führer until 1 November 1926.)
4	Franz Pfeffer von Salomon	Franz Pfeffer von Salomon (1888–1968)	1 November 1926	29 August 1930 (Note: Pfeffer von Salomon submitted a letter of resignation on 12 August 1930, effective 29 August. Hitler accepted the resignation and named himself as Oberste SA-Führer effective 2 September.)	3 years, 301 days	NSDAP	
5	Adolf Hitler	Adolf Hitler (1889–1945)	2 September 1930	30 April 1945 ‡‡	14 years, 240 days	NSDAP	

=== Timeline ===
This is a graphical timeline of the Oberster SA-Führer. They are listed in order of first assuming office.

The following chart lists the Oberster SA-Führer by lifespan, with the years outside of their tenure in grey.

== See also ==
- List of SS personnel
- Stabschef
- Uniforms and insignia of the Sturmabteilung

== Bibliography ==
- Höffkes, Karl (1986). Hitlers Politische Generale. Die Gauleiter des Dritten Reiches: ein biographisches Nachschlagewerk. Tübingen: Grabert-Verlag. ISBN 3-87847-163-7.
- McNab, Chris (2009). The Third Reich. Amber Books Ltd. ISBN 978-1-906626-51-8.
- Miller, Michael D.; Schulz, Andreas (2017). Gauleiter: The Regional Leaders of the Nazi Party and Their Deputies, 1925-1945. Vol. II (Georg Joel - Dr. Bernhard Rust). R. James Bender Publishing. ISBN 978-1-932970-32-6.
- Miller, Michael D.; Schulz, Andreas (2015). Leaders of the Storm Troops. Vol. 1. Solihull, England: Helion & Company. ISBN 978-1-909-98287-1.
