= Joseph Berchtold =

Second commander of the SS (1897–1962)

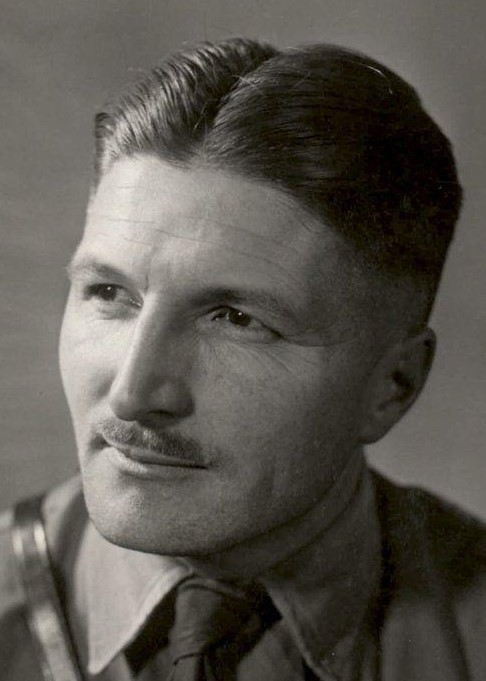
- Berchtold in his SA uniform

2nd Reichsführer-SS
- In office 15 April 1926 – 1 March 1927
- Leader: Adolf Hitler
- Preceded by: Julius Schreck
- Succeeded by: Erhard Heiden

Personal details
- Born: 6 March 1897 Ingolstadt, Kingdom of Bavaria, German Empire
- Died: 23 August 1962 (aged 65) Herrsching, Bavaria, West Germany
- Party: Nazi Party (1920–1921, 1922–1945)
- Other political affiliations: German Workers' Party (1920)

Military service
- Allegiance: German Empire
- Branch/service: Royal Bavarian Army
- Years of service: 1914–1918
- Rank: Leutnant
- Battles/wars: World War I
- Awards: Iron Cross, 2nd class

Joseph Berchtold (6 March 1897 – 23 August 1962) was a German Nazi official and journalist who was the 2nd Reichsführer-SS from 1926 to 1927. An early senior Nazi Party member, he was a co-founder of the Sturmabteilung (SA) and Schutzstaffel (SS).

Berchtold served in World War I and upon Germany's defeat joined the German Workers' Party (DAP), a small extremist organization at the time. He remained in the party after it became known as the National Socialist German Workers' Party (Nazi Party; NSDAP) and went on to become the second commander of the Schutzstaffel (SS) from April 1926 to March 1927.

After resigning as the SS leader, Berchtold spent much of his time writing for Nazi magazines and journals. He survived the war, but was arrested by the Allies. Berchtold was later released and died in 1962. He was only person who held the rank of Reichsführer-SS to survive the Second World War.

== Early life ==
Joseph Berchtold was born on 6 March 1897 in Ingolstadt, Berchtold attended school in Munich from 1903 to 1915. He went on to serve in the Royal Bavarian Army during World War I (1914–1918) and held the rank of Leutnant at the end of the war. After the war, he studied economics at the Ludwig-Maximilians-Universität München and gained employment as a journalist. In early 1920, he joined the small right-wing extremist group the German Workers' Party (DAP). He remained in the party after it became known as the National Socialist German Workers' Party (Nazi Party; NSDAP). Berchtold became the treasurer of the Nazi Party, until he resigned at the end of July 1921.

== SA career ==
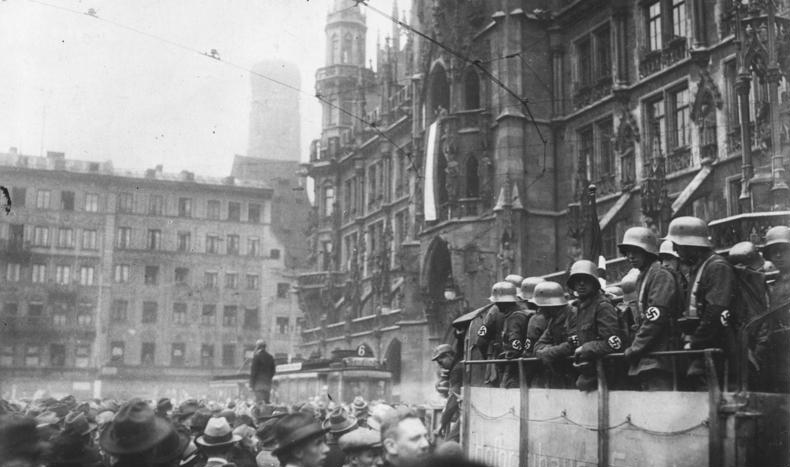
SA men taking part in the Beer Hall Putsch in Munich, 1923

Upon re-joining the party in 1922, Berchtold became a member of the Sturmabteilung ('Storm Detachment'; SA), a paramilitary wing formed to protect its speakers at rallies, and to police Nazi meetings. Adolf Hitler, leader of the party since 1921, ordered the formation of a small separate bodyguard dedicated to his protection instead of less trustworthy ordinary party members in 1923. Originally the unit was composed of only eight men, commanded by Julius Schreck and Berchtold. It was initially designated the Stabswache ('Staff Guard'). Later that year, the unit was renamed Stoßtrupp-Hitler ('Shock troop-Hitler').

On 9 November 1923 the Stoßtrupp, along with the SA and several other paramilitary units, took part in what would become known as the Beer Hall Putsch. The plan was to first take control of Munich, then Bavaria and then seize total power by marching on Berlin, much like how Mussolini and his Blackshirts had done in Italy. The coup d'état failed and resulted in the death of 16 Nazis, three police officers, and one bystander. In the aftermath of the putsch both Hitler and other Nazi leaders were incarcerated at Landsberg Prison. The Nazi Party and all associated formations, including the Stoßtrupp, were officially disbanded and outlawed. Berchtold ended up fleeing to Tirol, Austria. He was tried in absentia in Munich before the special People's Court in 1924 for his role in the Beer Hall Putsch and sentenced to a prison term. During his time in Austria, Berchtold continued to be involved with Nazi Party activities, even though it was illegal.

When Hitler was released from prison on 20 December 1924, Berchtold was District Director of the Nazi Party in Carinthia, Austria and was leader of the SA there. After the re-formation of the Nazi Party on 20 February 1925, he rejoined it, documented as member #964. In March 1926, Berchtold returned to Munich from Austria. He became chief of the SA in Munich not long after.

== SS career ==
On 15 April 1926, Berchtold became the successor to Schreck as chief of the Schutzstaffel ('Protection Squadron'; SS), a special elite branch of the party under the control of the SA. Berchtold changed the title of the office position which became known as the Reichsführer-SS. He issued new rules to establish the position of the SS. The rules stated the unit was "neither a military organisation nor a group of hangers-on, but a small squad of men that our movement and our Führer can rely on."

He further stressed that the men must follow "only party discipline". He was considered to be more dynamic than his predecessor, but was still unable to keep the party organizers at bay. He was frustrated in his efforts to have a more independent unit and became disillusioned by the SA's authority over the SS. On 1 March 1927, he handed over leadership of the SS to his deputy Erhard Heiden.

== After the SS ==
In 1927, he became a lead writer for Völkischer Beobachter, the Nazi Party newspaper. From 1928 to 1945, Berchtold was an SA leader, serving on the staff of the Supreme SA leadership (OSAF). In 1934, he became the permanent deputy editor-in-chief of the Völkischer Beobachter. In the following years, he was primarily a Nazi Party journalist and propagandist. In 1928, Berchtold founded the newspaper SA-Mann ("SA Man"), which was published by the OSAF. Until January 1938, he was its main writer. Berchtold was also the author of various Nazi publications and on the staff of additional magazines.

Additional posts in Nazi Germany were of secondary importance to Berchtold. From March 1934 to the end of the war, Berchtold served on the city council in Munich. On 15 November 1935, Berchtold was appointed Reich Culture Senator. In addition, he belonged to the "Cultural Circle of the SA" from 6 March 1936. On 29 March 1936, he was elected to the Reichstag from electoral constituency 32 (Baden) and retained this seat until the fall of Nazi Germany. From 29 April 1940, Berchtold served as a Hauptmann ('captain') of reserves in the Wehrmacht on a temporary basis.

== Postwar ==
After World War II in Europe ended, Berchtold was arrested in 1945 and interned at Oberpfaffenhofen. He died on 23 August 1962, in Herrsching am Ammersee, near Munich.

== Promotions ==
Berchtold's Ranks
Date	Rank
1 November 1926	Reichsführer-SS
1 January 1933	SA-Oberführer
9 November 1934	SA-Brigadeführer
1 May 1937	SA-Gruppenführer
29 April 1940	Hauptmann der Reserve
30 January 1942	SA-Obergruppenführer

== Awards and decorations ==
- 1914 Iron Cross 2nd Class
- Military Merit Cross (Bavaria) with Swords
- The Honour Cross of the World War 1914/1918 with Swords, 1934
- Blood Order #9, 1934
- Honour Chevron for the Old Guard, 1934
- Golden Party Badge, 1933
- Nazi Party Long Service Award (bronze, silver, gold)

== See also ==
- Glossary of Nazi Germany
- List of Nazi Party leaders and officials

Government offices
Preceded by Julius Schreck	Reich Leader of the SS; 1926–1927	Succeeded by Erhard Heiden
