= Reichsführer-SS =

German Nazi paramilitary commander rank

- SS Reichsführer
- Eagle of Nazi Germany

- Command flag

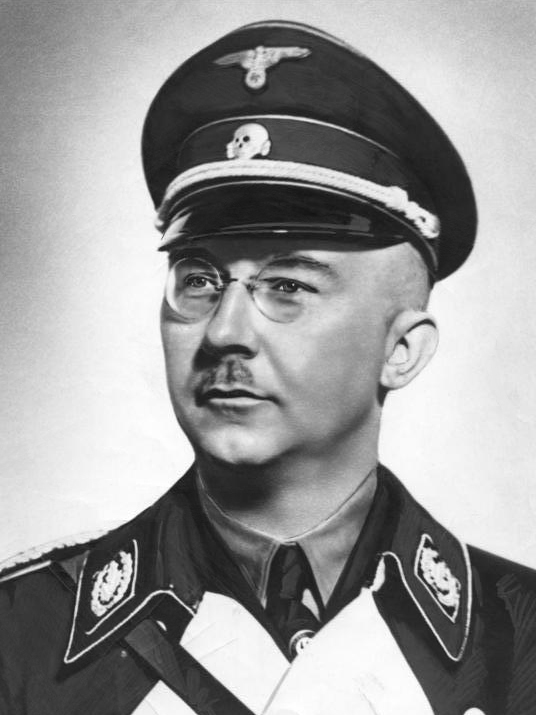
- Longest-serving; Heinrich Himmler; 6 January 1929 – 29 April 1945
- Schutzstaffel (SS)
- Type: Commanding officer
- Status: Abolished
- Abbreviation: RfSS
- Member of: Kommandostab
- Reports to: Adolf Hitler
- Appointer: Adolf Hitler
- Term length: Not fixed
- Formation: 4 April 1925
- First holder: Julius Schreck
- Final holder: Karl Hanke
- Abolished: 8 May 1945
- Deputy: Deputy Reichsführer-SS

Collar and shoulder insignia in 1934

Reichsführer-SS (German: [ˈʁaɪçsˌfyːʁɐ ˌʔɛsˈʔɛs], lit. 'Reich Leader-SS') was a special title and rank that existed between the years of 1925 and 1945 for the commander of the Schutzstaffel (SS), and it was the highest rank of the SS. The longest-serving and most noteworthy office holder was Heinrich Himmler.

== Definition ==
Reichsführer-SS was both a title and a rank. The title of Reichsführer was first created in 1926 by the second commander of the SS, Joseph Berchtold. Julius Schreck, founder of the SS and Berchtold's predecessor, never referred to himself as Reichsführer. Yet, the title was retroactively applied to him in later years. In 1929, Heinrich Himmler became Reichsführer-SS and referred to himself by his title instead of his regular SS rank of Obergruppenführer. This set the precedent for the commander of the SS to be called Reichsführer-SS.

Prior to the Night of the Long Knives, the SS was an elite corps of the Sturmabteilung (SA or storm troopers), and the Reichsführer-SS was subordinate to the SA's operating head, the Stabschef. On 20 July 1934, as part of the purge of the SA, the SS was made an independent branch of the Nazi Party, responsible only to Hitler. From that point on, the title of Reichsführer-SS became an actual rank, and in fact the highest rank of the SS. In this position, Himmler was on paper the equivalent of a Generalfeldmarschall in the German Army. As Himmler's position and authority grew in Nazi Germany, so did his rank in a "de facto" sense. Further, there was never more than one Reichsführer-SS at any one time, with Himmler holding the position as his personal title from 1929 (becoming his actual rank in 1934) until April 1945.

== Duties ==
Under its original inception, the title and rank of Reichsführer-SS was the designation for the head of the Allgemeine SS (General-SS). In this capacity, the SS Reich Leader was the direct commander of the SS Senior District Leaders (SS-Oberabschnitt Führer); by 1936, the Reichsführer-SS was head of the three main SS branches: the Allgemeine SS, SS-Verfügungstruppe (SS-VT; political action troops), and the SS-Totenkopfverbände (SS-TV; concentration camp service).

During the Second World War, the Reichsführer-SS in effect held several additional roles and wielded enormous personal power. He was responsible for all internal security within Nazi Germany. He was overseer of the concentration camps, extermination camps (through the Concentration Camps Inspectorate and SS-TV), and the Einsatzgruppen mobile death squads (through the Reich Security Main Office; RSHA). Over time, his influence on both civil and foreign policy became marked, as the Reichsführer reported directly to Hitler and his actions were not tempered by checks and balances. This meant the office holder could implement broad policy, such as the Nazi plan for the Genocide or extermination of the Jews, or order criminal acts such as the Stalag Luft III murders, without impediment.

It is difficult to separate the office from the duties assigned to the individual. As of 20 April 1934, Himmler in his position of Reichsführer-SS already controlled the SD and the Gestapo. On 17 June 1936 Himmler was named chief of all German police, thereby placing all uniformed police (Orpo) and criminal police (Kripo) in Germany under his control. In the latter role, he was nominally subordinate to the Interior Minister, Wilhelm Frick. It is not clear how much of this power would technically reside in the office of the Reichsführer-SS were those duties to be split up. (Note: As noted in the book The SS: "Himmler...was now the head of two important, separate organizations – the SS and the national police (emphasis added)." Much of his power and influence as Reichsführer-SS resided from control of the police, duties separate, yet linked.) These questions became moot by the time Himmler became the Interior Minister in 1943.

It is difficult to define precisely the full detailed duties and responsibilities of the Reichsführer-SS beyond that of leader and senior member of the SS, since, in the words of historian Martin Windrow, "by the outbreak of the (Second World) war it would have been impossible to define exactly the role within the state" of the entire SS itself.

== Relationship with the Waffen-SS ==
The rank of Reichsführer-SS was defined in the SS hierarchy as the highest possible rank of the Allgemeine-SS. The exact position of the rank within the Waffen-SS evolved over many years, ranging from clearly defined to vaguely associated. The Waffen-SS was originally the small armed SS unit known as the SS-Verfügungstruppe (SS-VT), and in the 1930s was under the command of Himmler who, in his position as Reichsführer-SS, issued directives and orders to SS-VT commanders. Hold-outs existed for some aspects of the armed SS however, as well as within the special bodyguard unit known as the SS-Leibstandarte. Although the unit was nominally under Himmler, Sepp Dietrich was the real commander and handled its day-to-day administration.

The Waffen-SS eventually grew from three regiments to over 38 divisions and served alongside the German Army, but was never formally part of it. During World War II, the authority of the Reichsführer-SS over the Waffen-SS was mainly administrative in that certain General-SS offices controlled supply and logistics aspects of it. Himmler also held authority to create new Waffen-SS divisions as well as order the formation of various smaller SS combat units. The daily association with the Waffen-SS, however, encompassed primarily inspecting Waffen-SS troops and presenting high-ranking medals to its members.

The Reichsführer-SS further never exercised direct operational authority over Waffen-SS units until the very end of the war and then only through his capacity as an Army Group commander and not as the head of the SS. Top Waffen-SS commanders, such as Sepp Dietrich, Wilhelm Bittrich, and Matthias Kleinheisterkamp, further held a certain derision for Himmler, describing him as "sly and unmilitary".

== Kommandostab Reichsführer-SS ==
Attached to the office was the 18,438-strong SS formations managed by the Kommandostab Reichsführer-SS ("Command Staff Reichsführer-SS") reporting directly to Himmler. To head the Command Staff, Himmler appointed career army officer Kurt Knoblauch, who acted as chief of staff for the units. Prior to the launch of the invasion of the Soviet Union in June 1941, these formations included two motorized SS-Infantry Brigades, two SS-Cavalry Regiments combined into the SS Cavalry Brigade, a bodyguard battalion, flak units and a number of companies of support troops. Units were temporarily placed under army command for operations, but the Reichsführer could call them back at any time. Despite the name, it was not employed as a unified HQ unit. Instead, its individual units were sent to occupied areas, subordinated to local Higher SS and Police Leaders (HSSPFs) and used for so-called "pacification actions" alongside the Einsatzgruppen. Often these actions were atrocities and mass murders, targeting Jews, political prisoners and "suspected partisans".

== Office holders ==
In all, five people held the title of Reichsführer-SS during the twenty years of its existence. Three persons held the position as a title while two held the actual SS rank.

No.	Portrait	Reichsführer-SS	Took office	Left office	Time in office	Party	Ref.
1	Julius Schreck	Julius Schreck (1898–1936)	4 April 1925	15 April 1926	1 year, 11 days	NSDAP	
2	Joseph Berchtold	Joseph Berchtold (1897–1962)	15 April 1926	1 March 1927	320 days	NSDAP	
3	Erhard Heiden	Erhard Heiden (1901–1933)	1 March 1927	6 January 1929	1 year, 311 days	NSDAP	
4	Heinrich Himmler	Heinrich Himmler (1900–1945)	6 January 1929	29 April 1945	16 years, 113 days	NSDAP	
5	Karl Hanke	Karl Hanke (1903–1945)	29 April 1945	8 May 1945	9 days	NSDAP	

Hanke was appointed SS leader in April 1945, but not informed until early May. He was captured by Czech partisans on 6 May and interned. He was killed on 8 June, while attempting to escape a POW camp. Historians have often speculated that Reinhard Heydrich would have eventually held the rank had Himmler in some way been killed or removed from his position earlier in World War II, and indeed Heydrich was often seen as Himmler's heir apparent by senior SS leaders. However, at a diplomatic function in Italy in 1941, Heydrich was reported as stating that he had no desire to succeed Himmler.

=== Timeline ===
This is a graphical timeline of the Reichsführer-SS. They are listed in order of first assuming office.

The following chart lists the Reichsführer-SS by lifespan, with the years outside of their tenure in grey.

== Deputy ==
Portrait	Stellvertretender RfSS	Took office	Left office	Time in office	Party	Ref.
Heinrich Himmler	SS-Oberführer; Heinrich Himmler (1900–1945)	September 1927	6 January 1929	1 year, 4 months	NSDAP	

== See also ==
- Personal Staff Reichsführer-SS
- Freundeskreis der Wirtschaft
