= Bensberg Castle =

Hotel and former hunting lodge in Bergisch Gladbach, North Rhine-Westphalia, Germany

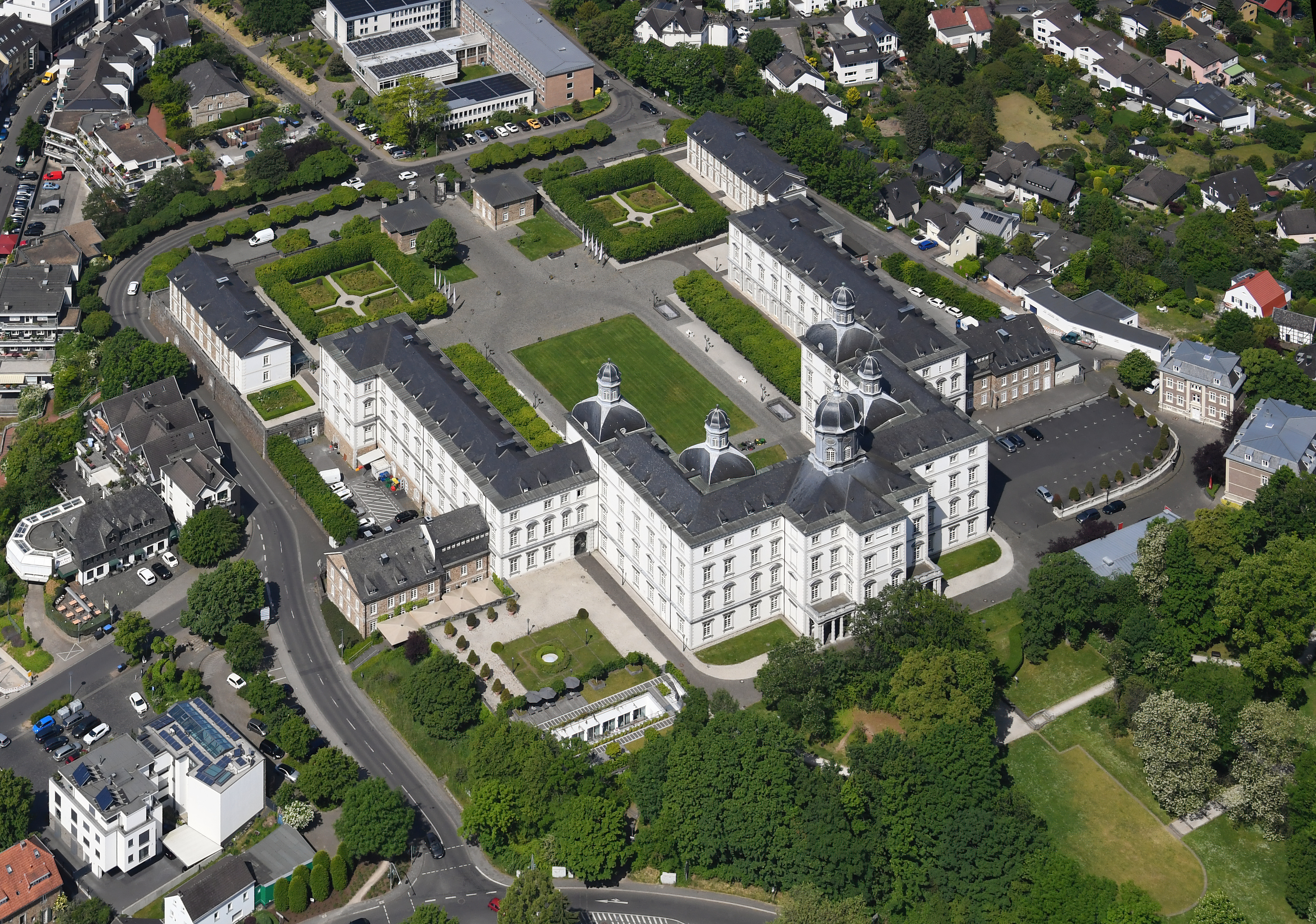
- Coordinates: 50°58′0.84″N 7°9′43.99″E

Bensberg Castle (German: Schloss Bensberg) is a former royal hunting lodge in Bergisch Gladbach, North Rhine-Westphalia, Germany. It is now operated as a luxury hotel under the name 'Althoff Grandhotel Schloss Bensberg'. The central axis of the building complex is exactly aligned with Cologne Cathedral.

== History ==
The hotel was built in the early 18th century. During the COVID-19 pandemic, association football club 1. FC Köln moved their quarantine training grounds to the site. From October 1945 to March 1946 it was the home of the 2nd Battalion Welsh Guards.

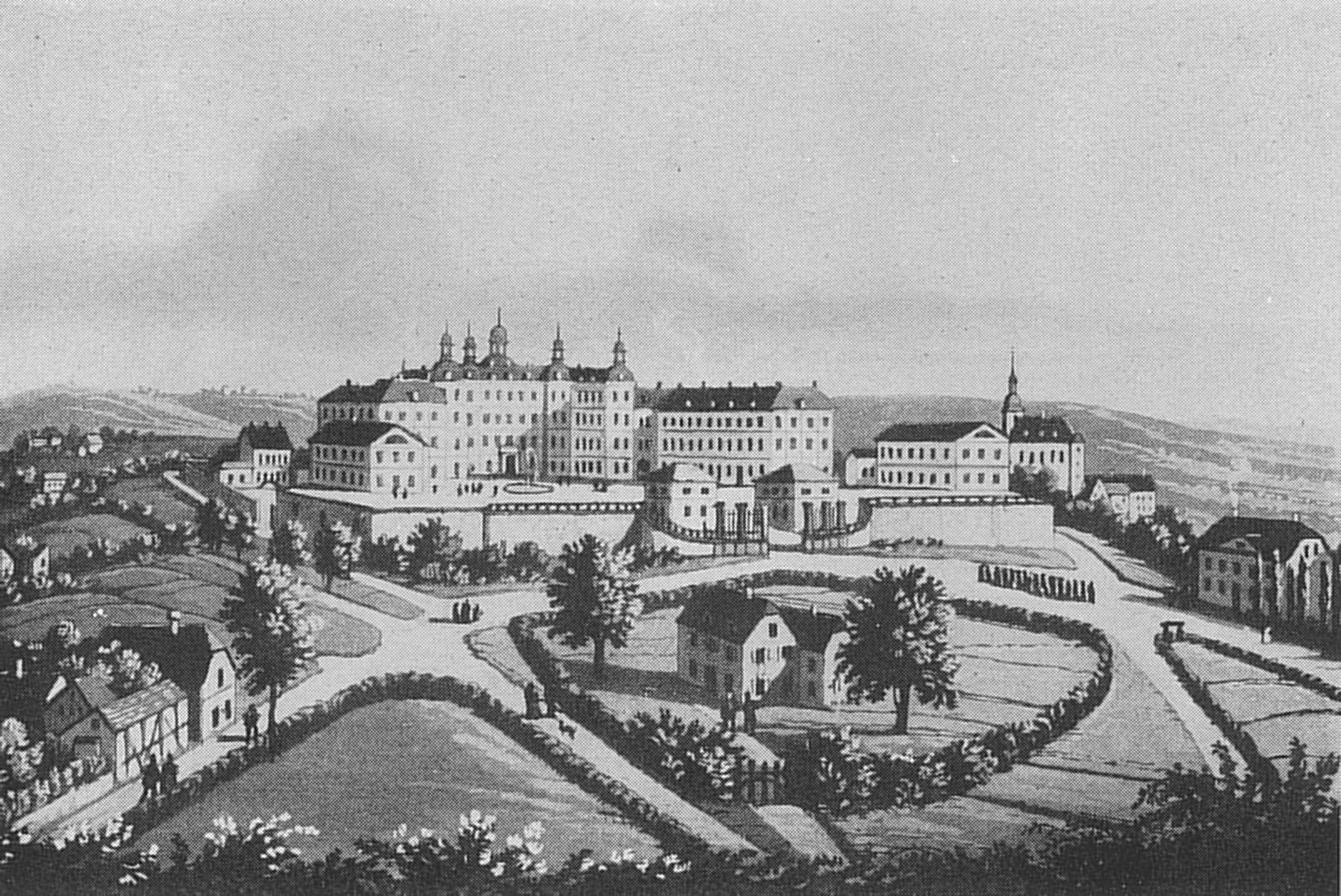
Drawing of Bensberg Castle in the 19th-century.
