= Verbotzeit =

Period when the Nazi Party was banned

The Verbotzeit ("time of prohibition" [the grammatically correct German term is Verbotszeit]) refers to the fifteen-month period between

- the collapse of Hitler's Beer Hall Putsch in Munich (9 November 1923), and
- the termination of Bavaria's official ban against the Nazi Party and its organs and instruments (such as the Volkischer Beobachter and the SA) (16 February 1925).

== Background ==
On 24 June 1922 the German Foreign Minister, Walther Rathenau, a Jew who was undertaking to carry out Germany's treaty obligations under the Treaty of Versailles, was assassinated by right-wing terrorists belonging to the Organisation Consul while on his way to work. In response, the national government in Berlin, acting through the Reichstag and under the direction of Chancellor Joseph Wirth, promulgated a Law for the Protection of the Republic (LFPR). Wirth gave a stirring and prophetic speech to the Reichstag following the murder of his respected minister in which he pointed to the right-wing delegates of parliament and then famously declared "The danger stands on the right!" The new national law increased the punishments for politically motivated acts of violence and banned organizations that opposed the "constitutional republican form of government" along with their printed matter and meetings. A special court in Leipzig was also constituted by the LFPR, and the court was vested with exclusive jurisdiction over violations of the LFPR. The court consisted of nine members who were appointed by the President of the Republic, which would limit the effects of judicial provincialism and particularism. In a move intended to limit the influence of the Republic's conservative (and often monarchical) judiciary, only three of the nine judges were required to be professional jurists; the others could be lay judges.

The Bavarian Landtag, resistant to the central power and jealous of its own "sovereignty", retaliated by enacting a Bavarian law that claimed to suspend the operation of the national law in Bavaria and to replace the LFPR with its own Bavarian Decree for Protection of the Republic. The Bavarian High Court declared the maneuver to be a legal and effective procedure. The constitutional crisis was resolved by a compromise: the Bavarian Decree was withdrawn, and the national LFPR was amended to provide that a co-equal "southern division" of the new court was established, and that three of the lay judges in that division had to be Bavarian.

By early 1923, the states of Prussia, Saxony, Baden, Thuringia, Schaumburg-Lippe, Mecklenburg-Schwerin, Hamburg, Bremen and Hesse had banned the Nazi Party under the provisions of the Law for the Protection of the Republic. In March, the German Supreme Court upheld all prohibitions of the party in locations where it had been active in 1922. The Nazi newspaper the Völkischer Beobachter was also banned. In the trial of Adolf Hitler for his part in the failed 1923 Beer Hall Putsch, the court refused to apply the provisions of the law to "a man who thinks and feels as German as Hitler". The law would have required that he be deported to Austria as a foreigner convicted of high treason.
