= Franz Pfeffer von Salomon =

First Sturmabteilung leader (1888–1968)

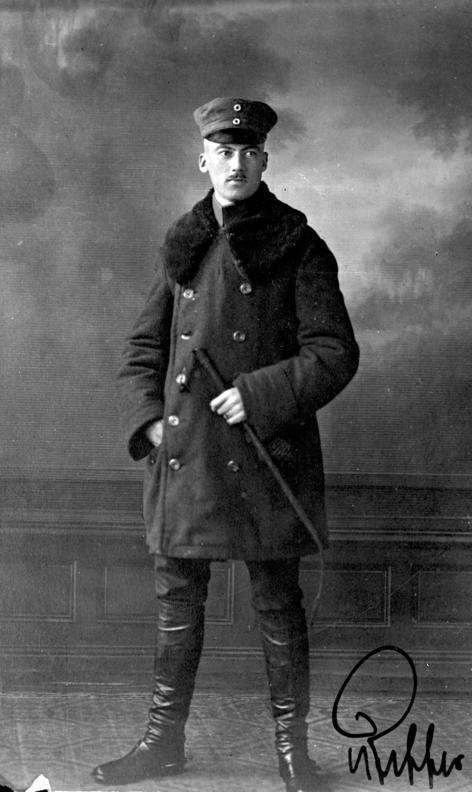

Oberster SA-Führer
- In office 1 November 1926 – 29 August 1930
- Leader: Adolf Hitler
- Preceded by: Hermann Göring (until November 1923)
- Succeeded by: Adolf Hitler

Gauleiter of Gau Westphalia
- In office 27 March 1925 – 7 March 1926
- Preceded by: Position established
- Succeeded by: Position abolished

Gauleiter of Großgau Ruhr
- In office 7 March 1926 – 20 June 1926
- Preceded by: Position established
- Succeeded by: Karl Kaufmann

Member of the Reichstag
- In office 6 November 1932 – 27 November 1941
- President: Hermann Göring

Personal details
- Born: Franz Felix Pfeffer von Salomon; 19 February 1888 Düsseldorf, Rhine Province, Kingdom of Prussia, German Empire
- Died: 12 April 1968 (aged 80) Munich, Bavaria, West Germany
- Resting place: Munich Waldfriedhof
- Party: Nazi Party
- Other political affiliations: Völkisch-Social Bloc; German Party
- Spouse: Maria Raitz von Frentz
- Children: 4
- Parent(s): Max Pfeffer von Salomon (Father); Anna von Clavé-Bouhaben (mother)
- Relatives: Friedrich Pfeffer von Salomon (brother)
- Education: University of Heidelberg
- Profession: Soldier

Military service
- Allegiance: German Empire; Nazi Party
- Branch/service: Imperial German Army; Sturmabteilung (SA)
- Years of service: 1911–1930
- Rank: Hauptmann
- Unit: 13th Infantry Regiment (1st Westphalian)
- Battles/wars: World War I
- Awards: Iron Cross 1st and 2nd class Wound Badge, in black

Franz Pfeffer von Salomon (19 February 1888 – 12 April 1968), known during the Nazi regime as Franz von Pfeffer, was the first Supreme Leader of the Sturmabteilung (SA) after its re-establishment in 1925. Pfeffer resigned from his SA command in 1930 and was expelled from the Nazi Party in 1941. He died in 1968.

== Early years ==
Pfeffer was born the son of a Prussian bureaucrat, the oldest of seven children. He was from a noble family of the Lower Rhine. After graduating from the gymnasium he studied law at the University of Heidelberg. He worked briefly as a law clerk prior to starting a military career. He attended military school for two years and entered military service in October 1910. He became a Fahnenjunker (officer candidate) and served in Infantry Regiment No. 13 (1st Westphalian) throughout the First World War on the Western Front in both combat and staff positions, earning the Iron Cross 1st and 2nd Class. Discharged with the rank of Hauptmann at the war's end in November 1918, he became active in the Freikorps. He formed and led the Westphalian “Freikorps von Pfeffer” in the Baltic states, the Ruhr and Upper Silesia until March 1920. He then participated in the failed Kapp Putsch and was detained for a time, but granted an amnesty in 1921. He was very active in organizing resistance groups to put an end to the French occupation of the Ruhr (1923–25). He began to be involved in right wing politics, joining the Völkisch-Social Bloc in 1924 and becoming the Chairman of its Landesverband (State Association) in the Province of Westphalia from May 1924 to March 1925.

== Nazi Party and SA career ==
Pfeffer joined the Nazi Party in March 1925 (membership number 16,101) shortly after the ban on it in the aftermath of the Beer Hall Putsch was lifted. He was named Gauleiter of Westphalia on 27 March 1925. In September 1925, he became a member of the National Socialist Working Association, a short-lived group of northern and western German Gauleiters, organized and led by Gregor Strasser, which unsuccessfully sought to amend the Party program. It was dissolved in 1926 following the Bamberg Conference.

Pfeffer remained Gauleiter in Westphalia until 7 March 1926 when his Gau was merged with Gau North Rhineland to form Großgau Ruhr. He then ran the large new Gau in a triumvirate of sorts with Gauleiters Joseph Goebbels and Karl Kaufmann. Pfeffer was simultaneously the Gau SA-Führer. However, disputes and jealousies between them led to a reorganization ordered by Adolf Hitler on 20 June 1926 with Kaufmann remaining as the sole Gauleiter.

In August 1926, Pfeffer was charged by Hitler with the leadership of the entire SA. This was formalized on 1 November, when he was granted the title Oberster SA-Führer (Supreme SA Leader). He was the first SA commander upon its re-establishment in 1925, following its temporary abolition in 1923 in the wake of the abortive Beer Hall Putsch. Heinrich Himmler became Pfeffer's secretary in Munich.

Pfeffer set about strengthening and reorganizing the SA. He established seven new regional level SA-Oberführer commands in March 1928. In February 1929, their title was changed to OSAF-Stellvertreter (Deputy Supreme SA Leader). During his tenure, the SA expanded from around 30,000 to over 60,000. On 1 April 1930, Pfeffer was made Korpsführer of the newly established National Socialist Automobile Corps, the forerunner of the National Socialist Motor Corps (NSKK).

Pfeffer developed fundamental disagreements with Hitler about the nature of the SA. Whereas Hitler tried to place limitations on the autonomy of the SA, Pfeffer sought to strengthen the organization and make it more independent of the Party organization. Pfeffer saw the SA as a military/revolutionary institution that would eventually displace the Reichswehr to become a mass people's army and overthrow the Weimar Republic. Hitler, however, favored a legal seizure of power through the electoral process. In his view, the SA's job was to assist in the party's propaganda efforts through leafleting, to provide security at Party rallies and, when necessary, to battle political opponents in the streets. Pfeffer demanded (at a Nazi leadership conference held on 2 and 3 August 1930) that the SA be represented on the NSDAP electoral list in the upcoming Reichstag elections and that it be granted three secure seats in the Reichstag. Hitler refused and Pfeffer submitted a letter of resignation on 12 August, effective 29 August. Hitler accepted Pfeffer's resignation and on 2 September assumed personal command of the SA as Oberster SA-Führer. He then summoned Ernst Röhm to return to Germany from Bolivia to effectively run the SA as its Stabschef (Chief of Staff), since Hitler had no interest in running the day-to-day operations of the SA. Röhm took up his new post in January 1931.

== Later years ==
Pfeffer remained a member of the SA on active service with its General Inspectorate until April 1933. He was then put into the reserve leadership cadre of the SA. He was, however, elected to the Reichstag on 6 November 1932 and at the next two elections on the Nazi Party electoral list. At the March 1936 election, he switched to represent electoral constituency 16 (South Hanover–Braunschweig) and was reelected in April 1938.

Despite this, Pfeffer was treated with suspicion in Nazi Party circles. Following Rudolf Hess’s flight to Scotland in May 1941, he was briefly arrested and released. However, he was expelled from the party on 14 November 1941 and from the Reichstag on 27 November. He was by that point essentially retired, living on his estate in Pommern. Following the failed assassination attempt on Hitler in the 20 July 1944 plot, Pfeffer was arrested once more and this time held for several months. He survived the Second World War, even commanding a Volkssturm division near the war's end. He was then briefly interned in Heilbronn by the Allies until 1946. He was active in the Hessian State Association of the German Party during the late 1940s and early 1950s. He lived in Wiesbaden until 1960 and then in Munich, dying in 1968 at the age of 80.

== Family ==
His brother, Friedrich Pfeffer von Salomon (1892–1961), was an SA-Obergruppenführer, who served as the Police President in Kassel (1933–1936) and the Nazi Party Regierungspräsident in Wiesbaden (1936–1939; 1941–1943)

== Awards and decorations ==
- 1914 Iron Cross 2nd Class
- 1914 Iron Cross 1st Class
- 1918 Wound Badge in Black

Political offices
Vacant Title last held by Hermann Göring	Supreme SA Leader; 1926–1930	Succeeded by Adolf Hitler

== See also ==
- Gausturm
