= Sturmabteilung =

Nazi Party's original paramilitary wing

- SA insignia
- Other name: Brownshirts (Braunhemden)
- Leaders: Oberster SA-Führer; Stabschef
- Founded: 5 October 1921; 105 years ago
- Dissolved: 10 October 1945; 81 years ago
- Country: (Nazi Germany) Germany
- Allegiance: Adolf Hitler, Nazi Party
- Headquarters: SA High Command, Barerstraße, Munich; 48°08′38″N 11°34′03″E
- Ideology: Nazism
- Political position: Far-right
- Anthem: "Sturmlied" (lit. 'Storm Song')
- Size: approx. 4 million (1934 est.)
- Part of: Nazi Party (NSDAP)

The Sturmabteilung ([ˈʃtʊʁmʔapˌtaɪlʊŋ]; lit. 'Storm Division' or loosely 'stormtroopers'), or SA, was the original party militia of the Nazi Party of Germany. The organisation played a significant role in Hitler's rise to power in the 1920s and early 1930s. Its primary purposes were providing protection for Nazi rallies and assemblies, disrupting the meetings of opposing parties, fighting against the paramilitary units of the opposing parties, especially the Roter Frontkämpferbund of the Communist Party of Germany (KPD) and the Reichsbanner Schwarz-Rot-Gold of the Social Democratic Party of Germany (SPD), and intimidating Romani, trade unionists, and especially Jews.

The SA were colloquially called Brownshirts (Braunhemden) because of the colour of their uniform's shirts, similar to Benito Mussolini's Blackshirts. The official SA uniform was a brown shirt with a brown tie. The colour came about because a large shipment of Lettow-shirts, originally intended for the German colonial troops in Germany's former East Africa colony but which never reached its destination because of naval blockades, was purchased in 1921 by Gerhard Roßbach for use by his Freikorps paramilitary unit. They were later used for his Schill Youth organization in Salzburg, and in 1924 were adopted by the Schill Youth in Germany. The "Schill Sportversand" then became the main supplier for the SA's brown shirts. The SA developed pseudo-military titles for its members, with ranks that were later adopted by several other Nazi Party groups.

After Hitler rose to Nazi Party leadership in 1921, he formalized the party's militant supporters into the SA as a group that was to protect party gatherings. In 1923, owing to his growing distrust of the SA, Hitler ordered the creation of a bodyguard unit, Stoßtrupp-Hitler, which was abolished after the failed Beer Hall Putsch later that year. Not long after Hitler's release from prison, he ordered the creation of another bodyguard unit in 1925 that ultimately became the Schutzstaffel (SS). During the Night of the Long Knives (die Nacht der langen Messer) purge in 1934, the SA's then-leader Ernst Röhm was arrested and executed. The SA continued to exist but lost almost all its influence and was effectively superseded by the SS, which took part in the purge. The SA remained in existence until after Nazi Germany's final capitulation to the Allies in 1945, after which it was disbanded and outlawed by the Allied Control Council.

== Rise ==
The term Sturmabteilung predates the founding of the Nazi Party in 1919. Originally it was applied to the specialized assault troops of Imperial Germany in World War I who used infiltration tactics based on being organized into small squads of a few soldiers each. The first official German stormtrooper unit was authorized on March 2, 1915, on the Western Front. The German high command ordered the VIII Corps to form a detachment to test experimental weapons and develop tactics that could break the deadlock on the Western Front. On October 2, 1916, Generalquartiermeister Erich Ludendorff ordered all German armies in the west to form a battalion of stormtroopers. They were first used during the 8th Army's siege of Riga, and again at the Battle of Caporetto. Wider use followed on the Western Front in the German spring offensive in March 1918, when Allied lines were successfully pushed back tens of kilometers.

The DAP (Deutsche Arbeiterpartei, German Workers' Party) was formed in Munich in January 1919, and Adolf Hitler joined it in September of that year. His talents for speaking, publicity and propaganda were quickly recognized. (Note: Before the end of 1919, Hitler had already been appointed head of propaganda for the party, with party founder Anton Drexler's backing.) By early 1920 he had gained authority in the party, which changed its name to the NSDAP (Nationalsozialistische Deutsche Arbeiterpartei or National Socialist German Workers' Party) in February 1920. The party's executive committee added "Socialist" to the name over Hitler's objections, to help the party appeal to left-wing workers.

The precursor to the Sturmabteilung had acted informally and on an ad hoc basis for some time before this. Hitler, with an eye to helping the party to grow through propaganda, convinced the leadership committee to invest in an advertisement in the Münchener Beobachter (later renamed the Völkischer Beobachter) for a mass meeting in the Hofbräuhaus, to be held in Munich on October 16, 1919. Some 70 people attended, and a second such meeting was advertised for November 13 in the Eberl-Bräu beer hall, also in Munich. About 130 people attended; there were hecklers, but Hitler's military friends promptly ejected them by force, and the agitators "flew down the stairs with gashed heads". The next year on February 24, he announced the party's Twenty-Five Point program at a mass meeting of some 2,000 people at the Hofbräuhaus. Protesters tried to shout Hitler down, but his former army companions, armed with rubber truncheons, ejected the dissenters. The basis for the SA had been formed.

Hitler and Hermann Göring with SA stormtroopers in front of Frauenkirche, Nuremberg in 1928

A permanent group of party members, who would serve as the Saalschutzabteilung (meeting hall protection detachment) for the DAP, gathered around Emil Maurice after the February 1920 incident at the Hofbräuhaus. There was little organization or structure to this group. The group was also called the "Stewards Troop" (Ordnertruppen) around this time. More than a year later, on August 3, 1921, Hitler redefined the group as the "Gymnastic and Sports Division" of the party (Turn- und Sportabteilung), perhaps to avoid trouble with the government. It was by now well recognized as an appropriate, even necessary, function or organ of the party. The future SA developed by organizing and formalizing the groups of ex-soldiers and beer-hall brawlers who were to protect gatherings of the Nazi Party from disruptions from Social Democrats (SPD) and Communists (KPD), and to disrupt meetings of the other political parties. By September 1921 the name Sturmabteilung (SA) was being used informally for the group. Hitler was the official head of the Nazi Party by this time. (Note: At a special party congress held July 29, 1921, Hitler was appointed chairman. He announced that the party would stay headquartered in Munich and that those who did not like his leadership should just leave; he would not entertain debate on such matters. The vote was 543 for Hitler, and 1 against.)

The Nazi Party held a large public meeting in the Munich Hofbräuhaus on November 4, 1921, which attracted many Communists and other enemies of the Nazis. After Hitler had spoken for some time, the meeting erupted into a mêlée in which a small company of SA thrashed the opposition. The Nazis called this event the Saalschlacht (transl. Meeting hall battle), and it assumed legendary proportions in SA lore with the passage of time. Thereafter, the group was officially known as the Sturmabteilung.

The leadership of the SA passed from Maurice to the young Hans Ulrich Klintzsch in this period. He had been a naval officer and a member of the Ehrhardt Brigade, which had taken part in the failed Kapp Putsch attempted coup. When he took over command of the SA, he was a member of the notorious Organisation Consul (OC). (Note: The OC's most infamous action was probably the brazen daylight assassination of the foreign minister Walther Rathenau, in early 1922. Klintzsch was also a member of the somewhat more reputable Viking League (Bund Wiking).) The Nazis under Hitler began to adopt the more professional management techniques of the military.

In 1922, the Nazi Party created a youth section, the Jugendbund, for young men between the ages of 14 and 18 years. Its successor, the Hitler Youth (Hitlerjugend or HJ), remained under SA command until May 1932. Hermann Göring joined the Nazi Party in 1922 after hearing a speech by Hitler. He was given command of the SA as the Oberster SA-Führer in 1923. He was later appointed an SA-Obergruppenführer (general) and held this rank on the SA rolls until 1945.

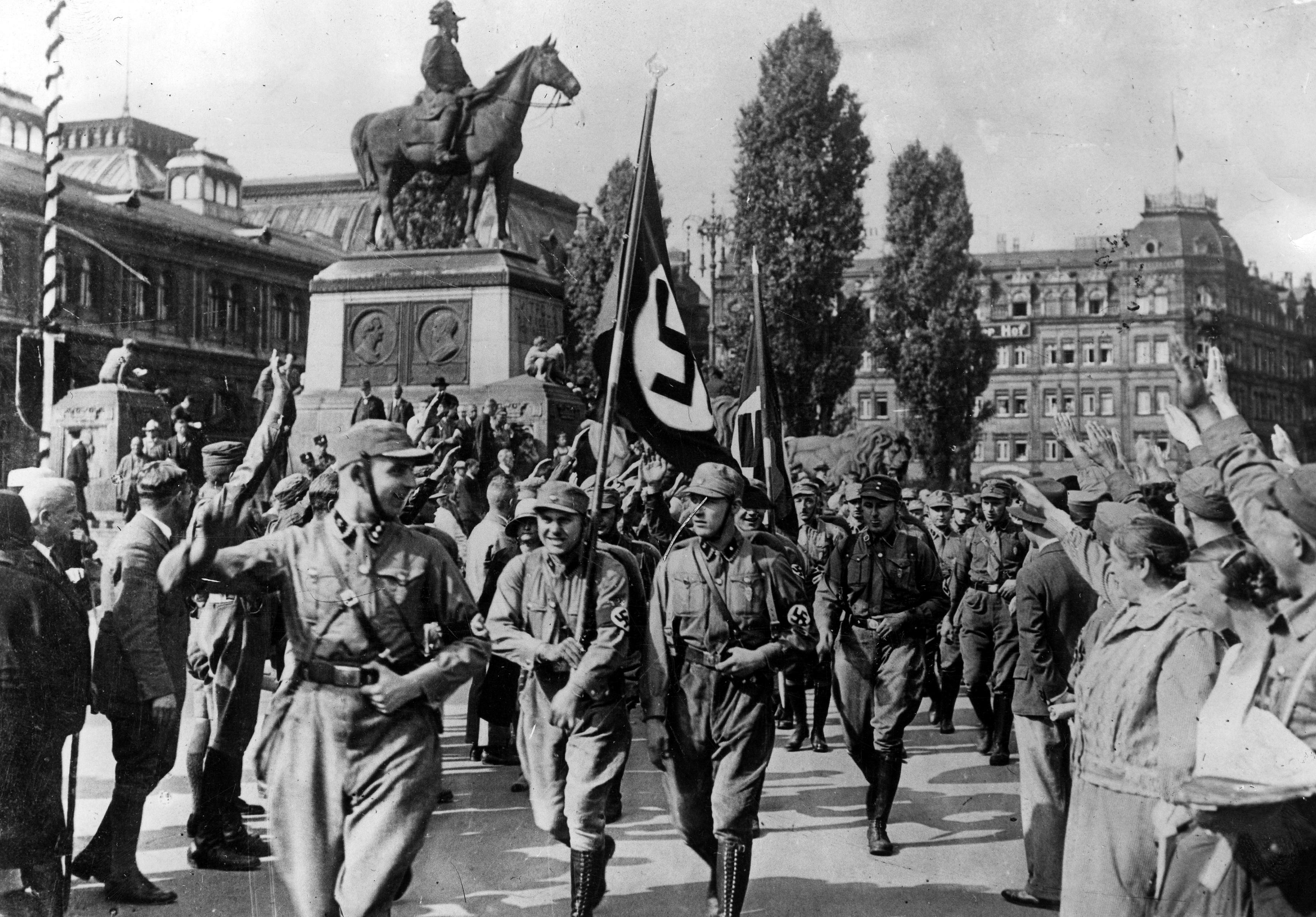
The SA unit in Nuremberg, 1929

From April 1924 until late February 1925, the SA was reorganized into a front organization known as the Frontbann to circumvent Bavaria's ban on the Nazi Party and its organs. (This had been instituted after the abortive Beer Hall Putsch of November 1923). While Hitler was in prison, Ernst Röhm helped to create the Frontbann as a legal alternative to the then-outlawed SA. In April 1924, Röhm had also been given authority by Hitler to rebuild the SA in any way he saw fit. When in April 1925 Hitler and Ludendorff disapproved of the proposals under which Röhm was prepared to integrate the 30,000-strong Frontbann into the SA, Röhm resigned from all political movements and military brigades on May 1, 1925. He felt great contempt for the "legalistic" path the party leaders wanted to follow and sought seclusion from public life. Throughout the 1920s and into the 1930s, members of the SA were often involved in street fights, called Zusammenstöße (collisions), with members of the Communist Party (KPD). In 1929, the SA added a Motor Corps for better mobility and a faster mustering of units. It also acquired an independent source of funds: royalties from its own Sturm Cigarette Company. Previously, the SA had been financially dependent on the party leadership, as it charged no membership fees; the SA recruited particularly among the many unemployed in the economic crisis. The SA used violence against shops and shopkeepers stocking competing cigarette brands; it also punished any SA member caught with non-Sturm cigarettes. Sturm marketing was also used to make military service more appealing. Cigarettes were sold with collectible sets of images of historical German army uniforms.

Marketing for the SA's Sturm Cigarette Company also promoted military service.

In September 1930, as a consequence of the Stennes revolt in Berlin, Hitler assumed supreme command of the SA as its new Oberster SA-Führer. He sent a personal request to Röhm, asking him to return to serve as the SA's chief of staff. Röhm accepted this offer and began his new assignment on January 5, 1931. He brought radical new ideas to the SA and appointed several close friends to its senior leadership.

Previously, the SA formations were subordinate to the Nazi Party leadership of each Gau. Röhm established new Gruppen that had no regional Nazi Party oversight. Each Gruppe extended over several regions and was commanded by a SA-Gruppenführer who answered only to Röhm or Hitler. Under Röhm as its popular leader and Stabschef (Staff Chief), the SA grew in importance within the Nazi power structure and expanded to have thousands of members. In the early 1930s, the Nazis expanded from an extremist fringe group to the largest political party in Germany, and the SA expanded with it. By January 1932, the SA numbered approximately 400,000.

Many of these stormtroopers believed in the strasserist promise of nazism. They expected the Nazi regime to take more radical economic action, such as breaking up the vast landed estates of the aristocracy, once they obtained national power. By the time Hitler assumed power in January 1933, SA membership had increased to approximately 2,000,000—twenty times as large as the number of troops and officers in the Reichswehr (German Army).

== Fall ==
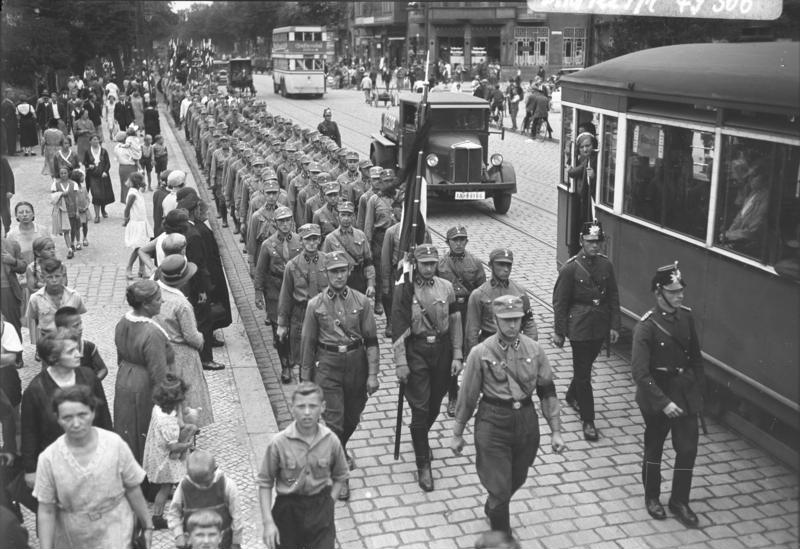
An SA unit in Berlin in 1932

After Hitler and the Nazis obtained national power, the SA leadership also became increasingly eager for power. By the end of 1933, the SA numbered more than 3 million men, and many believed they were the replacement for the "antiquated" Reichswehr. Röhm's ideal was to absorb the army (then limited by the Treaty of Versailles to no more than 100,000 men) into the SA, which would be a new "people's army". This deeply offended and alarmed the professional army leaders and threatened Hitler's goal of co-opting the Reichswehr. The SA's increasing power and ambitions also posed a threat to other Nazi leaders. Originally an adjunct to the SA, the Schutzstaffel (SS) was placed under the control of Heinrich Himmler, in part to restrict the power of the SA and their leaders. The younger SS had evolved to be more than a bodyguard unit for Hitler and demonstrated that it was better suited to carry out Hitler's policies, including those of a criminal nature.

Although some of the conflicts between the SS and SA were based on personal rivalries of leaders, the mass of members had key socio-economic differences and related conflicts. SS members generally came from the middle class, while the SA had its base among the unemployed and working class. Politically speaking, the SA was more radical than the SS, with its leaders arguing the Nazi revolution had not ended when Hitler achieved power, but rather needed to implement Strasserism in Germany. Hitler believed that the defiant and rebellious culture encouraged before the seizure of power had to give way to using these forces for community organization. But the SA members resented tasks such as canvassing and fundraising, considering them Kleinarbeit ("legwork"), which had typically been performed by women before the Nazi seizure of power. Rudolf Diels, the first Gestapo chief, estimated that in 1933 Berlin, 70 percent of new SA recruits were former Communists.

In 1933, General Werner von Blomberg, the Minister of Defence, and General Walter von Reichenau, the chief of the Reichswehr's Ministerial Department, became increasingly concerned about the growing power of the SA. Röhm had been given a seat on the National Defence Council and began to demand more say over military matters. On October 2, 1933, Röhm sent a letter to Reichenau that said: "I regard the Reichswehr now only as a training school for the German people. The conduct of war, and therefore of mobilization as well, in the future is the task of the SA."

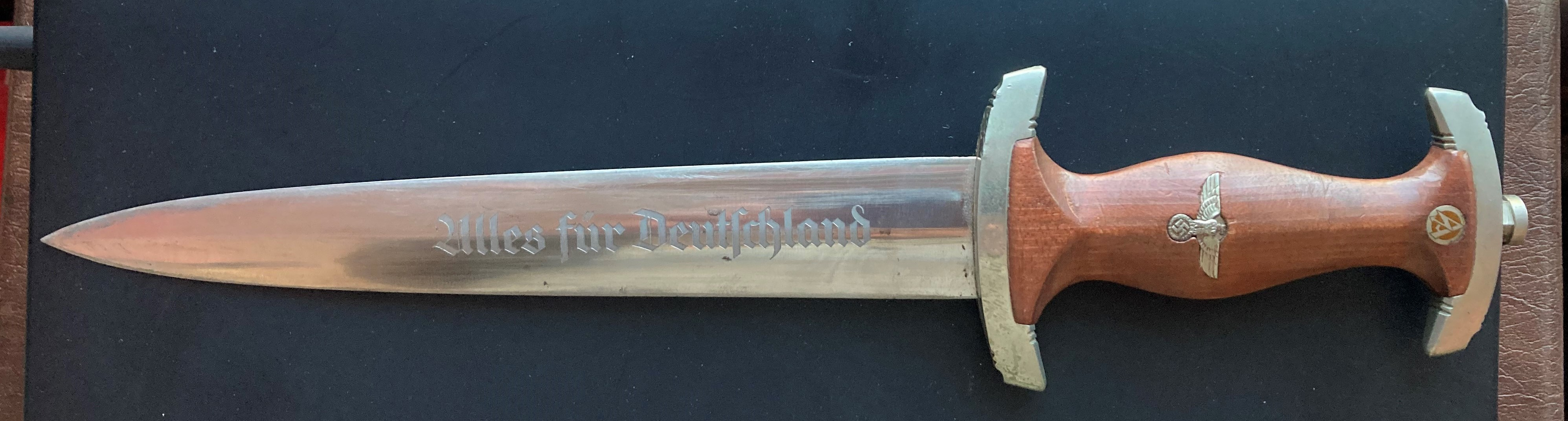
SA knife

Blomberg and von Reichenau began to conspire with Göring and Himmler against Röhm and the SA. Himmler asked Reinhard Heydrich to assemble a dossier on Röhm. Heydrich recognized that for the SS to gain full national power, the SA had to be broken. He manufactured evidence to suggest that Röhm had been paid 12 million marks by French agents to overthrow Hitler. Hitler liked Röhm and initially refused to believe the dossier provided by Heydrich. Röhm had been one of his first supporters and, without his ability to obtain army funds in the early days of the movement, it is unlikely that the Nazis would have ever become established. The SA under Röhm's leadership had also played a vital role in destroying the opposition during the elections of 1932 and 1933.

== Night of the Long Knives ==
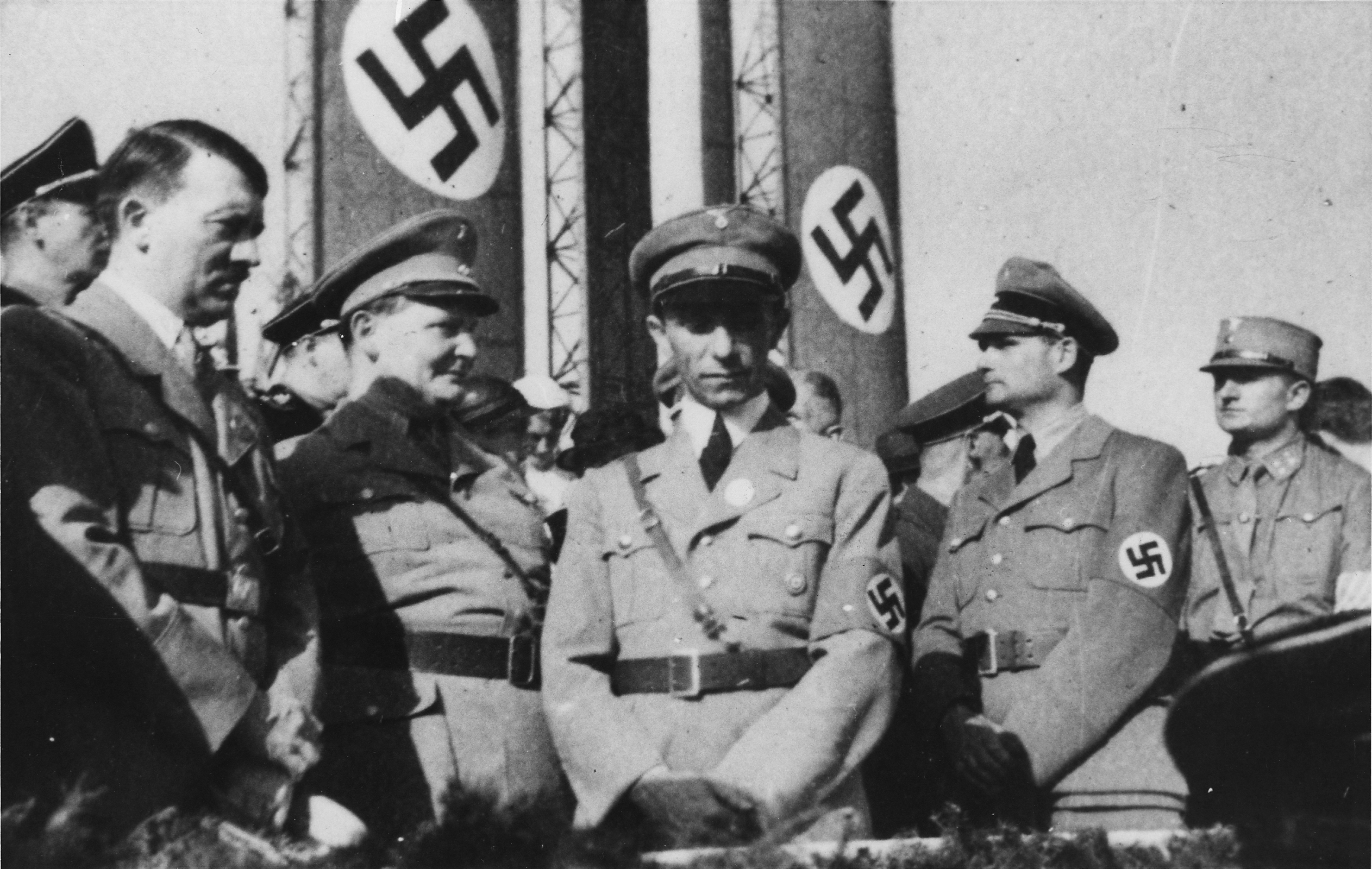
The architects of the purge: Hitler, Göring, Goebbels, and Hess. Only Himmler and Heydrich are absent.

Hitler had his own reasons for wanting Röhm removed. Some of his powerful supporters had been complaining about Röhm for some time. The generals opposed Röhm's desire to have the SA, a force of by then over three million men, absorb the much smaller German Army into its ranks under his leadership. Since the officers had developed the Reichswehr as a professional force of 100,000, they believed that it would be destroyed if merged with millions of untrained SA thugs. Furthermore, the army commanders were greatly concerned about reports of a huge cache of weapons in the hands of SA members. Industrialists, who had provided the funds for the Nazi victory, were unhappy with Röhm's socialistic views on the economy and his claims that the real revolution had still to take place. President Hindenburg informed Hitler in June 1934 that if a move to curb the SA was not forthcoming, he would dissolve the government and declare martial law.

Hitler was also concerned that Röhm and the SA had the power to remove him as leader. Göring and Himmler played on this fear by constantly feeding Hitler with new information on Röhm's proposed coup. A masterstroke was to claim that Gregor Strasser, whom Hitler felt had betrayed him, was part of the planned conspiracy against him. With this news, Hitler ordered all the SA leaders to attend a meeting in the Hanselbauer Hotel in Bad Wiessee.

On June 30, 1934, Hitler, accompanied by SS units, arrived at Bad Wiessee, where he personally placed Röhm and other high-ranking SA leaders under arrest. Over the next 48 hours, 200 other senior SA officers were arrested on the way to Wiessee. Many were shot and killed as soon as they were captured, but Hitler decided to pardon Röhm because of his past services to the movement. On July 1, after much pressure from Göring and Himmler, Hitler agreed that Röhm should die. Hitler insisted that Röhm should first be allowed to commit suicide. When Röhm refused to do so, he was shot by two SS officers, Theodor Eicke and Michael Lippert. Most estimates place the total number killed at between 150 and 200 men, though some put the estimate as high as 1,000. However, there are only 85 named victims, the rest remain unidentified.

Some Germans were shocked by the executions, but many others perceived Hitler to have restored "order" to the country. Goebbels' propaganda highlighted the "Röhm-Putsch" in the days that followed. The homosexuality of Röhm and other SA leaders was made public to add "shock value", although Hitler and other Nazi leaders had known for years about the sexuality of Röhm and other named SA leaders.

== After the purge ==
After the Night of the Long Knives, the SA continued to operate, under the leadership of Stabschef Viktor Lutze, but the group was significantly downsized. Within a year's time, the SA membership was reduced by more than 40%. However, the Nazis increased attacks against Jews in the early 1930s and used the SA to carry these out.

In November 1938, after the assassination of German diplomat Ernst vom Rath by Herschel Grynszpan (a Polish Jew), the SA was used for "demonstrations" against the act. In violent riots, members of the SA shattered the glass storefronts of about 7,500 Jewish stores and businesses. The events were referred to as Kristallnacht ('Night of Broken Glass', more literally 'Crystal Night'). Jewish homes were ransacked throughout Germany. This pogrom damaged, and in many cases destroyed, about 200 synagogues (constituting nearly all Germany had), many Jewish cemeteries, more than 7,000 Jewish shops, and 29 department stores. Some Jews were beaten to death and more than 30,000 Jewish men were arrested and taken to concentration camps.

Thereafter, the SA became overshadowed by the SS; by 1939 it had little remaining significance in the Nazi Party, though it was never formally disbanded and continued to exist until the war ended. In January 1939, the role of the SA was officially established as a training school for the armed forces, with the establishment of the SA Wehrmannschaften (SA Military Units). With the start of World War II in September 1939, the SA lost most of its remaining members to military service in the Wehrmacht (armed forces).

In January 1941, long-standing rivalries between the Auswärtiges Amt (Foreign Office) and the SS exploded with the attempted coup d'état in Bucharest that saw SS back the coup by the Iron Guard under its leader Horia Sima against the Prime Minister, General Ion Antonescu, while the Auswärtiges Amt together with the Wehrmacht backed Antonescu. In the aftermath of the coup, the Foreign Minister Joachim von Ribbentrop made an effort to curb the power of the SS to conduct a foreign policy independent of the Auswärtiges Amt. Taking advantage of the long-standing rivalries between the SS and the SA, in 1941, Ribbentrop appointed an assemblage of SA men to head the German embassies in Eastern Europe, with Manfred Freiherr von Killinger going to Romania, Siegfried Kasche to Croatia, Adolf-Heinz Beckerle to Bulgaria, Dietrich von Jagow to Hungary, and Hanns Ludin to Slovakia in order to ensure that there would be minimal co-operation with the SS. The role of the SA ambassadors was that of "quasi-Reich governors" as they aggressively supervised the internal affairs of the nations they were stationed in, making them very much unlike traditional ambassadors. The SA leaders ambassadors fulfilled Ribbentrop's hopes in that all had distant relations with the SS, but as a group they were notably inept as diplomats with Beckerle being so crude and vulgar in his manners that King Boris III almost refused to allow him to present his credentials at the Vrana Palace. As the ambassador in Bratislava, Ludin arranged the deportation of 50,000 Slovak Jews to Auschwitz in 1942. On 23–24 August 1944, Killinger notably bungled the German response to King Michael I's Coup that saw King Michael I of Romania dismiss Antonescu, sign an armistice with the Allies, and declare war on Germany, thereby costing the Reich its largest source of oil. Of the SA ambassadors, Killinger and Jagow committed suicide in 1944 and 1945 respectively while Kasche and Ludin were executed for war crimes in 1947 in Yugoslavia and Czechoslovakia respectively. Beckerle spent 11 years in a Soviet POW camp, was released to West Germany in 1955, was charged with war crimes in 1966 for his role in the deportation of Macedonian Jews, which were dropped on grounds of ill health in 1968 and died in 1976 at a retirement home in West Germany.

In 1943, Viktor Lutze was killed in an automobile accident, and Wilhelm Schepmann was appointed as leader. Schepmann did his best to run the SA for the remainder of the war, attempting to restore the group as a predominant force within the Nazi Party and to mend years of distrust and bad feelings between the SA and SS. On the night of 29–30 March 1945, Austrian SA members were involved in a death march of Hungarian Jews from a work camp at Engerau (modern Petržalka, Slovakia) to Bad Deutsch-Altenburg that saw 102 of the Jews being killed, being either shot or beaten to death. In April 1945, Kreisstabsführer des Kremser Volkssturms (District Chief of Staff of the Krems Militia) and SA-Standartenführer (Colonel of the SA) Leo Pilz led a contingent of Volkssturm militiamen during the Stein Prison massacre, during which 400–500 prisoners were summarily executed. Post-war, Pilz and four others were sentenced to death by the People's Court of Vienna.

The SA ceased to exist in May 1945 when Nazi Germany collapsed. It was formally disbanded and outlawed by the Allied Control Council enacting Control Council Law No. 2 on October 10, 1945. In 1946, the International Military Tribunal at Nuremberg formally ruled that the SA was not a criminal organization.

== Leadership ==
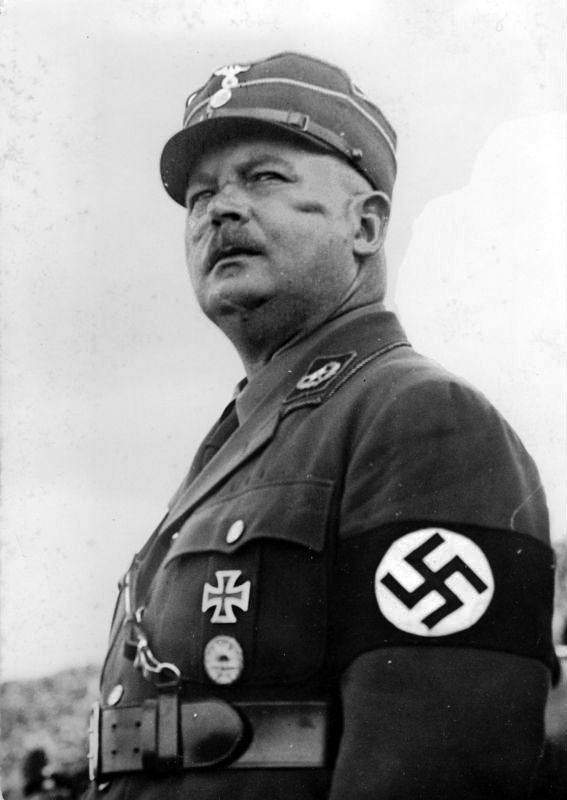
Ernst Röhm, SA Chief of Staff, 1931–1934

The leader of the SA was known as the Oberster SA-Führer, translated as Supreme SA-Leader. The following men held this position:

- Emil Maurice (1920–1921)
- Hans Ulrich Klintzsch (1921–1923)
- Hermann Göring (1923)
- None (1923–1925) (Note: The NSDAP and its organs and instruments (including the Völkischer Beobachter and the SA) were banned in Bavaria (and other parts of Germany) following Hitler's abortive attempt to overthrow the Weimar Republic in the Beer Hall Putsch in November 1923. The Bavarian ban was lifted in February 1925 after Hitler pledged to adhere to legal and constitutional means in his quest for political power. See Verbotzeit.)
- Franz Pfeffer von Salomon (1926–1930)
- Adolf Hitler (1930–1945)

In September 1930, to quell the Stennes Revolt and to try to ensure the personal loyalty of the SA to himself, Hitler assumed command of the entire organization and remained Oberster SA-Führer for the remainder of the group's existence until 1945. The day-to-day running of the SA was conducted by the Stabschef-SA (SA Chief of Staff), a position Hitler designated for Ernst Röhm. After Hitler's assumption of the supreme command of the SA, it was the Stabschef-SA who was generally accepted as the Commander of the SA, acting in Hitler's name. The following personnel held the position of Stabschef-SA:

- Otto Wagener (1929–1931)
- Ernst Röhm (1931–1934)
- Viktor Lutze (1934–1943)
- Max Jüttner (acting, May–August 1943)
- Wilhelm Schepmann (1943–1945)

== Organization ==
SA organization

The SA was organized into several large regional Gruppen ("Groups"). The group leader answered only to the Stabschef-SA or Hitler. Each Gruppe was made up of subordinate Brigaden ("Brigades"). Subordinate to the Brigaden were the smaller regiment-sized Standarten. SA-Standarten operated in every major German city and were split into even smaller units, known as Sturmbanne and Stürme.

The command nexus for the entire SA was the Oberste SA-Führung, located in Stuttgart. The SA supreme command had many sub-offices to handle supply, finance and recruiting.

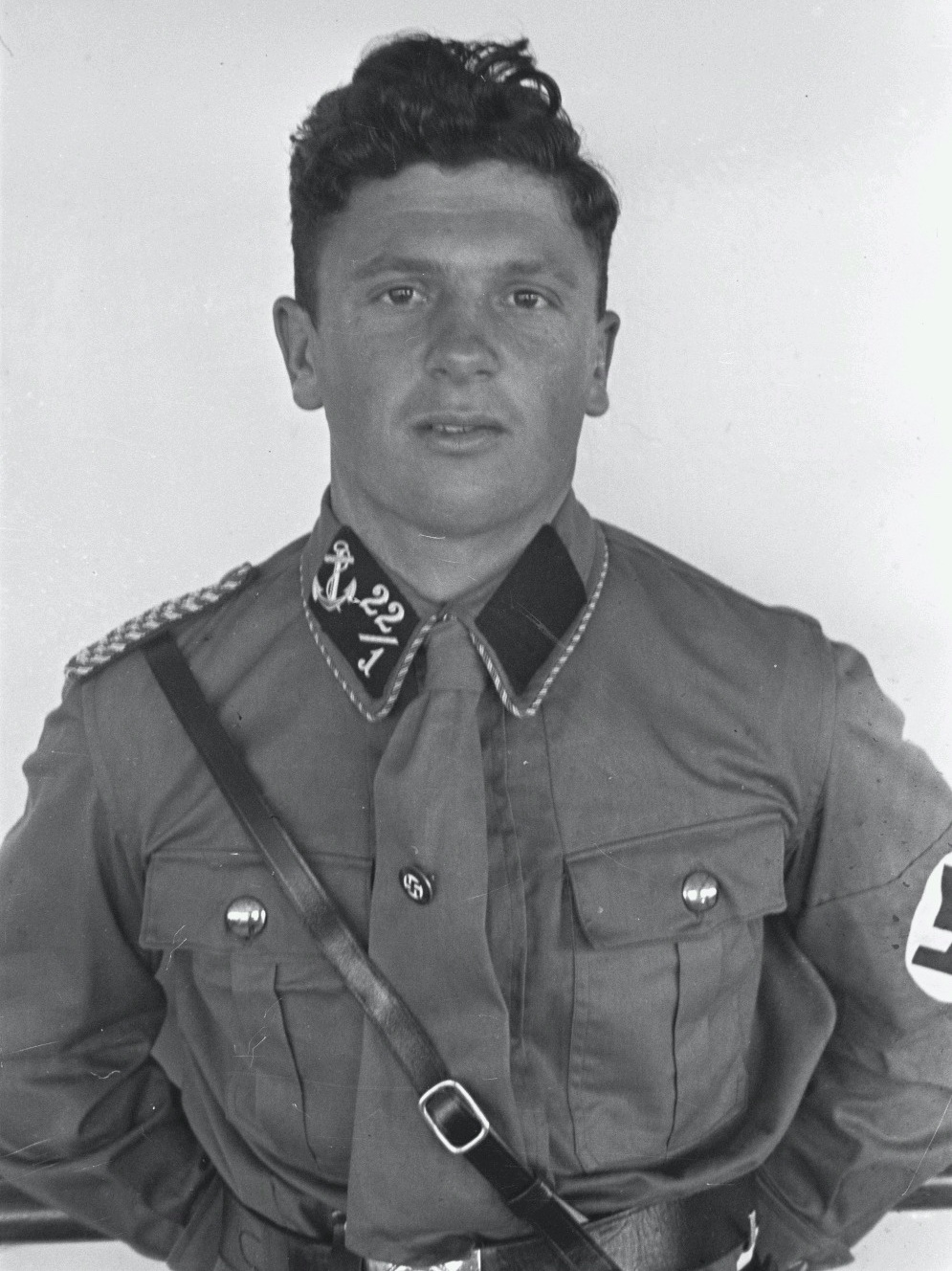
An SA-Sturmmann of the Marine-Sturmabteilung. His collar denotes that he is part of Sturm 22 / Standarte 1.

The SA also had several military training units. The largest was the SA-Marine, which served as an auxiliary to the Kriegsmarine (German Navy) and performed search and rescue operations as well as harbor defense. The SA also had an "army" wing, similar to the Waffen-SS, known as Feldherrnhalle. This formation expanded from regimental size in 1940 to a fully-fledged armored corps (Panzerkorps Feldherrnhalle) in 1945. As for units formed outside of Germany, after the success of the invasion of Poland in 1939, an SA unit, "Great Government" was formed. The units were renamed SA Wehrschützen-Bereitschaften in 1942. The title was abbreviated to SA Wehrbereitschaften, thereafter.

== Organization structure August 1934–1945 ==
- Oberste SA-Führung (Supreme SA-Command & Control)
- Gruppe (Group): consisting of several brigades (Note: The SA-Brigade was also designated as SA-Untergruppe (SA-Subgroup).)
- Brigade: 3 to 9 Standarten
- Standarte (Standard, regiment sized unit): 3 to 5 Sturmbanner
- Sturmbann (Storm jurisdiction, battalion-sized unit): 3 to 5 Stürme
- Sturm (Storm, company sized sub-unit): 3 to 4 Trupps
- Trupp (Troop, platoon-sized sub-unit): 3 to 4 Scharen
- Schar (section): 1 or 2 Rotten (squads or teams)
- Rotte (squad or team): 4 to 8 SA-Men
- SA-Mann (SA-Man/SA-Trooper)

== "Beefsteaks" within the ranks ==
In his 1936 Hitler: A Biography, German historian Konrad Heiden remarked that within the SA ranks, there were "large numbers of former Communists and Social Democrats" and that "many of the storm troops were called 'beefsteaks' – brown outside and red within." The influx of non-Nazis into the Sturmabteilung membership was so prevalent that SA men would joke that "In our storm troop there are three Nazis, but we shall soon have spewed them out."

The number of "beefsteaks" was estimated to be large in some cities, especially in northern Germany, where the influence of Gregor Strasser and Strasserism was significant. The head of the Gestapo from 1933 to 1934, Rudolf Diels, reported that "70 percent" of the new SA recruits in the city of Berlin had been communists. This is evidenced further by historians, "As for the prior youth group memberships, nearly half of the SS members and nearly one-third of the instant stormtroopers were with the Free Corps, vigilantes, or militant veterans' groups during their first 25 years of life. They also came in disproportionate numbers from left-wing youth groups such as the Socialist or Communist Youth or the Red Front (RFB)."

Historians have argued that since most SA members came from working-class families or were unemployed, they were more amenable to Marxist-leaning socialism, expecting Hitler to fulfill the 25-point National Socialist Program. Historian Thomas Friedrich states that the repeated efforts by the Communist Party of Germany (KPD) to appeal to the working-class backgrounds of the SA were "doomed to failure", because most SA men were focused on the nationalistic cult of Hitler and destroying the "Marxist enemy", a term that was used to identify both the KPD and the Social Democratic Party of Germany (SPD).

== See also ==
- Corps colors of the Sturmabteilung
- Uniforms and insignia of the Sturmabteilung
- Glossary of Nazi Germany
- List of Nazi Party leaders and officials
- Militia
- Political color
- Political uniform
- National Action (UK) – Neo-nazi organization which uses logo based on SA
- SA-Feldjägerkorps (SA Field Police)

Similar paramilitary organizations

- Albanian Fascist Party – Albania ("Blackshirts")
- Bajrang Dal – India
- Bangladesh Chhatra League – Bangladesh
- Black Brigades – Italy
- Blackshirts – Italy
- British Union of Fascists – United Kingdom ("Blackshirts")
- Blue Shirts Society – China (Kuomintang)
- Blueshirts – Ireland
- Blueshirts – Spain
- Black Shorts – parody of the blackshirts in the writings of P. G. Wodehouse
- Freikorps – independent paramilitary organizations of ex-German Army soldiers and unemployed workers who fought against Communist uprisings after World War I
  - Sudetendeutsches Freikorps – paramilitary organizations of the Nazi Germany
- Greenshirts – Ireland
- Gold shirts – Mexico
- Greyshirts – ethnically Dutch South Africans (Afrikaaners)
- Hirden – paramilitary wing of the NS, the Norwegian National Socialist party 1940–45.
- Integralismo
- Iron Guard – Romania ("Greenshirts")
- Italian Social Republic – ("Blackshirts")
- Militia organizations in the United States
- National Socialist Motor Corps – another Nazi Party organization
- National Socialist Flyers Corps – another Nazi Party organization
- Parti national social chrétien – Canada ("Blueshirts")
- Portuguese Legion – Portugal
- Red Shirts – United States
- Silver Legion of America – United States ("Silvershirts")
- Squadrismo
- Tatenokai
- Weimar paramilitary groups
- Yokusan Sonendan
- Weerbaarheidsafdeling – paramilitary arm of the NSB, the Dutch fascist and later National Socialist political party 1931–45.

== Bibliography ==
- Alford, Kenneth (2002). Nazi Millionaires: The Allied Search for Hidden SS Gold. Casemate Publishers. ISBN 978-0-9711709-6-4.
- Baranowski, Shelley (2010). Nazi Empire: German Colonialism and Imperialism from Bismarck to Hitler. Cambridge; New York: Cambridge University Press. ISBN 978-0-521-67408-9.
- Bloch, Michael (1992). Ribbentrop. New York: Crown Publishers. ISBN 0517593106.
- Brown, Timothy S. (2009). Weimar Radicals: Nazis and Communists between Authenticity and Performance. Berghahn Books. ISBN 9781845459086. Archived from the original on August 2, 2023.
- Bullock, Alan (1958). Hitler: A Study in Tyranny. New York: Harper.
- Campbell, Bruce (1998). The SA Generals and The Rise of Nazism. University Press of Kentucky. ISBN 0-8131-2047-0.
- Drury, Ian (2003). German Stormtrooper 1914–1918. Osprey Publishing.
- Friedrich, Thomas (2012). Hitler's Berlin: Abused City. Translated by Spencer, Stewart. New Haven, Connecticut: Yale University Press. ISBN 978-0-300-16670-5.
- Garscha, Wilfrid (2012). "Ordinary Austrians: Common War Criminals of World War II". In Bischof, Günter; Plasser, Fritz; Maltschnig, Eva (eds.). Austrian Lives. University of New Orleans Press. pp. 304–326. ISBN 978-1-60801-140-7.
- Goodman, Joyce; Martin, Jane (2002). Gender, colonialism and education: the politics of experience. London; Portland, OR: Woburn Press. ISBN 0-7130-0226-3.
- Heiden, Konrad (1938). Hitler: A Biography. London: Constable & Co. Ltd.
- Hoffmann, Peter (2000) [1979]. Hitler's Personal Security: Protecting the Führer 1921–1945. Da Capo Press. ISBN 978-0-30680-947-7.
- Kershaw, Ian (2008). Hitler: A Biography. New York: W. W. Norton & Company. ISBN 978-0-393-06757-6.
- Jacobsen, Hans-Adolf (1999). "The Structure of Nazi Foreign Policy, 1933–1945". In Leitz, Christian (ed.). The Third Reich The Essential Readings. Blackwell. pp. 49–94. ISBN 9-780631-207009.
- Lindner, Erik. "Zwölf Millionen für Göring". Cicero Online. Archived from the original on August 26, 2018.
- Littlejohn, David (1990). The Sturmabteilung: Hitler's Stormtroopers 1921–1945. London: Osprey Publishing.
- Manchester, William (2003). The Arms of Krupp, 1587–1968: The Rise and Fall of the Industrial Dynasty That Armed Germany at War. Back Bay. ISBN 0-316-52940-0.
- McNab, Chris (2009). The SS: 1923–1945. Amber Books Ltd. ISBN 978-1-906626-49-5.
- McNab, Chris (2011). Hitler's Masterplan: The Essential Facts and Figures for Hitler's Third Reich. Amber Books Ltd. ISBN 978-1907446962.
- McNab, Chris (2013). Hitler's Elite: The SS 1939–45. Osprey Publishing. ISBN 978-1-78200-088-4.
- Miller, Michael D.; Schulz, Andreas (2015). Leaders of the Storm Troops. Vol. 1. Solihull, England: Helion & Company. ISBN 978-1-909982-87-1.
- Mitcham, Samuel W. Jr. (1996). Why Hitler?: The Genesis of the Nazi Reich. Westport, Connecticut: Praeger. ISBN 0-275-95485-4.
- Siemens, Daniel (September 11, 2013). "Nazi storm-troopers' cigarettes" (University department). UCL SSEES Research Blog. Archived from the original on October 6, 2019.
- Toland, John (1976). Adolf Hitler. Garden City, New York: Doubleday & Company. ISBN 0-385-03724-4.
- Wheeler-Bennett, John (2005) [1967]. The Nemesis of Power. London: Macmillan. ISBN 978-1-4039-1812-3.
- Yerger, Mark C. (1997). Allgemeine-SS: The Commands, Units, and Leaders of the General SS. Schiffer Publishing Ltd. ISBN 0-7643-0145-4.
- Zentner, Christian; Bedürftig, Friedemann (1991). The Encyclopedia of the Third Reich. New York: Macmillan Publishing. ISBN 0-02-897500-6.

Further reading

- Bessel, Richard (1984). Political Violence and The Rise of Nazism: The Storm Troopers in Eastern Germany, 1925–1934. Yale University Press. ISBN 0-300-03171-8.
- Evans, Richard J. (2003). The Coming of the Third Reich. Penguin Group. ISBN 978-0-14-303469-8.
- Evans, Richard J. (2005). The Third Reich in Power. New York: Penguin. ISBN 978-0-14-303790-3.
- Fischer, Conan (1983). Stormtroopers: A Social, Economic, and Ideological Analysis, 1929–35. Allen & Unwin. ISBN 0-04-943028-9.
- Halcomb, Jill (1985). The SA: A Historical Perspective. Crown/Agincourt Publishers. ISBN 0-934870-13-6.
- Hatch, Nicholas H. (trans. and ed.) (2000). The Brown Battalions: Hitler's SA in Words and Pictures. Turner. ISBN 1-56311-595-6.
- Maracin, Paul (2004). The Night of the Long Knives: 48 Hours that Changed the History of the World. The Lyons Press.
- Merkl, Peter H. (1980). The Making of a Stormtrooper. Princeton University Press. ISBN 0-691-07620-0.
- Mitchell, Otis C. (2008). Hitler's Stormtroopers. McFarland & Company. ISBN 9780786477296.
- Reiche, Eric G. (1986). The Development of the SA in Nürnberg 1922–1934. Cambridge University Press. ISBN 9780521524315.
- Siemens, Daniel (2018). Stormtroopers. A new history of Hitler's Brownshirts. Yale University Press. ISBN 9780300196818.
- Wackerfuss, Andrew (2015). Stormtrooper Families: Homosexuality and Community in the Early Nazi Movement. Harrington Park Press. ISBN 9781939594051.
