= Lenk (disambiguation) =

Lenk, officially Lenk im Simmental, is a municipality in the district of Obersimmental in the canton of Bern in Switzerland

Lenk may also refer to:

== People ==
- Arthur Lenk (born 1964), Israeli diplomat
- Barbara Lenk (1950–2026), American attorney and jurist
- Barbara Lenk (politician) (born 1982), German politician
- Gustav Adolf Lenk (1903–1987), German political activist
- Hans Lenk (1935–2024), German rower
- Heimar Lenk (born 1946), Estonian journalist and politician
- Katrina Lenk (born 1974), American actress, singer and dancer
- Krzysztof Lenk (1936–2018), Polish graphic designer
- Maria Lenk (1915–2007), Brazilian swimmer
- Peter Lenk (born 1947), German sculptor
- Robin Lenk (born 1984), German former football player and manager
- Tom Lenk (born 1976), American stage and television actor

== Other uses ==
- Maria Lenk Aquatics Centre, in Rio de Janeiro, Brazil
