= Kampfbund =

1920s league of German nationalist groups

The Deutscher Kampfbund ("German Battle League") was a league of nationalist fighting societies and the German National Socialist Party in Bavaria, Germany, in the 1920s. It included Adolf Hitler's Nazi Party (NSDAP) and its Sturmabteilung (SA), the Oberland League and the Bund Reichskriegsflagge. Hitler was its political leader (as of 25 September 1923), while Hermann Kriebel led its militia and Max Erwin von Scheubner-Richter became managing director.

The league was created on 1–2 September 1923 at Nuremberg, where Hitler joined other nationalist leaders to celebrate Sedantag, which marked the anniversary of the Prussian victory over France in 1870. The purpose was to consolidate and streamline their agendas and also prepare to take advantage of the split between Bavaria and the central government. The impetus for this consolidation was the declaration a few days earlier by the Berlin central government announcing the end to the resistance against the French occupation of the Ruhr, whose apparent capitulation infuriated the nationalists and freebooters. The Kampfbund conducted the Beer Hall Putsch of November 1923 in Munich, Germany.

== Member affiliations ==
By this time, the German Workers' Party (DAP) had changed its name to the National Socialist German Workers' Party (NSDAP). It had grown from a fringe sect to Bavaria's most powerful political force of 70,000 members. By 1923, the SA was the Nazi Party's private army with about 15,000 members. A subgroup of the NSDAP was the Stoßtrupp-Hitler, a personal bodyguard unit for Hitler under the command of Joseph Berchtold. Another group was the Party's youth group Jungsturm Adolf Hitler led by Adolf Lenk.

The Oberland League was a paramilitary organization led by Friedrich Weber. It had 4,000 armed troops, practically all disgruntled war veterans. This unit was a Freikorps unit.

The Bund Reichskriegsflagge (Imperial War Flag Society) was another private army which had many war veterans, as well. The official leader was Joseph Seydel but Ernst Röhm was really in control.

== Putsch planning ==
On 26 September 1923, following a period of turmoil and political violence, Bavarian Prime Minister Eugen von Knilling declared a state of emergency and Gustav von Kahr was appointed Staatskommissar, or state commissioner, with dictatorial powers to govern the state. In addition to von Kahr, Bavarian state police chief Colonel Hans Ritter von Seisser and Reichswehr General Otto von Lossow formed a ruling triumvirate. Hitler announced that he would hold 14 mass meetings beginning on 27 September 1923. Afraid of the potential disruption, one of Kahr's first actions was to ban the announced meetings. Hitler was under pressure to act. The Nazis, with other leaders in the Kampfbund, felt they had to march upon Berlin and seize power or their followers would turn to the Communists. Meanwhile, on 5 October 1923 Kahr closed the Nazi paper Völkischer Beobachter for ten days. Kahr also announced a surprise speech at the Bürgerbräu Keller.

The putsch was inspired by Benito Mussolini's successful March on Rome, from 22 to 29 October 1922. Hitler and his associates planned to use Munich as a base for a march against Germany's Weimar Republic government. Hitler came to the realization that Kahr sought to control him and was not ready to act against the government in Berlin. Hitler wanted to seize a critical moment for successful popular agitation and support.

The putsch was planned on 7 November in a hasty decision in Kriebel's apartment. Not all members were notified. For the purpose of communicating, the party used two pieces of paper; one colored red meaning "the real thing" and the other white signifying a practice run. They chose to pass the white tag out. At the time of the putsch, only 2000 members of the Kampfbund were in Munich. On 8 November 1923, the putsch went forward, but failed.

== SA units and leaders ==
- 1st Battalion (Karl Beggel)
- 2nd Battalion (Edmund Heines)
- 3rd Battalion (Hans Knauth)
- 10th Company (Friedrich Mayer)
