= Martin Wambsgan =

- Born: August 19, 1839; Nußdorf, Kingdom of Bavaria
- Died: January 17, 1911 (aged 71); New York, US
- Burial place: Woodlawn Cemetery, Syracuse, New York
- Military career
- Allegiance: United States
- Branch: United States Army; Union Army
- Service years: 1861 - 1866
- Rank: Sergeant
- Unit: 90th New York Infantry Regiment
- Conflicts: American Civil War: Battle of Cedar Creek
- Awards: Medal of Honor

Martin Wambsgan (August 19, 1839 – January 17, 1911) was a German born Union Army soldier during the American Civil War. He received the Medal of Honor for gallantry during the Battle of Cedar Creek fought near Middletown, Virginia on October 19, 1864. The battle was the decisive engagement of Major General Philip Sheridan's Valley Campaigns of 1864 and was the largest battle fought in the Shenandoah Valley.

Wambsgan enlisted in the Union Army at Clyde, New York in October 1861. He re-enlisted in February 1864, and mustered out with his regiment in early 1866.

He was buried at Woodlawn Cemetery (Syracuse, NY), Section 21, Plot 97.

== Medal of Honor citation ==
"The President of the United States of America, in the name of Congress, takes pleasure in presenting the Medal of Honor to Private Martin Wambsgan, United States Army, for extraordinary heroism on 19 October 1864, while serving with Company D, 90th New York Infantry, in action at Cedar Creek, Virginia. While the enemy were in close proximity, Private Wambsgan sprang forward and bore off in safety the regimental colors, the Color Bearer having fallen on the field of battle."

== See also ==
- List of American Civil War Medal of Honor recipients: T-Z
