= Wilhelm Brückner =

Nazi officer (1884–1954)

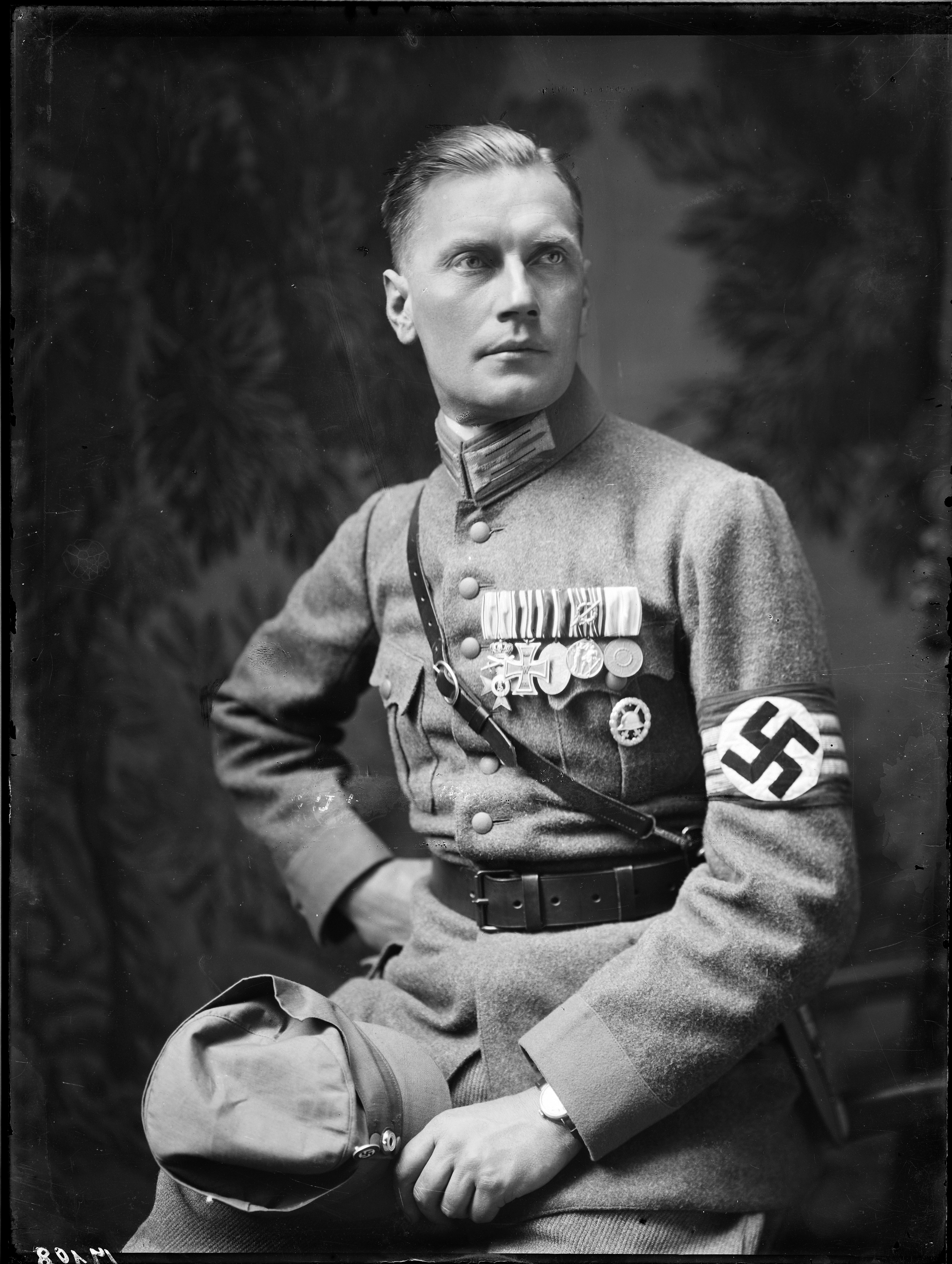
- Brückner in 1924

Chief Adjutant to Hitler
- In office 20 February 1934 – 18 October 1940
- Succeeded by: Julius Schaub

Personal details
- Born: Wilhelm Friedrich Brückner; 11 December 1884 Baden-Baden, German Empire
- Died: 20 August 1954 (aged 69) Herbsdorf, Upper Bavaria, West Germany
- Spouse: Ana Turnsteer Vogelvang
- Children: Hermann Van Marchena Turnsteer (1934–1934)
- Relatives: Angela Brückner (Mother)
- Nickname: Wilhelm Brückner

Military service
- Allegiance: German Empire; Weimar Republic; Nazi Germany
- Branch/service: German Empire; Reichswehr; German Army
- Rank: Oberst; SA-Obergruppenführer
- Unit: Schützenregiment 42
- Battles/wars: World War I World War II

Wilhelm Friedrich Brückner (11 December 1884 – 20 August 1954) was a German military officer who served as Adolf Hitler's chief adjutant from 1930 to October 1940. Thereafter, Brückner joined the Heer (army), becoming an Oberst (colonel) by war's end. He died on 20 August 1954 in West Germany.

== Life ==
Brückner was born and raised in Baden-Baden. He did his Abitur there in 1905. Afterwards he studied law and economics in Strasbourg (then Straßburg, Germany), Freiburg, Heidelberg and Munich. In the First World War, Brückner was an officer in a Bavarian infantry regiment and was discharged as a lieutenant. After the war, he joined the Freikorps Epp and participated in Schützenregiment 42 as a member of the Reichswehr in suppressing the Bavarian Soviet Republic. Towards the end of 1919 Brückner was once again going to university, and worked for three years as a film recording technician. In late 1922 he joined the Nazi Party and the Sturmabteilung (SA). On 1 February 1923, he became leader of the Munich SA Regiment. Brückner was among those who were active in spurring on the Putsch. He warned Adolf Hitler early in November "We have so many unemployed in the ranks, men who have spent their last on uniforms, that the day is not far off when I won't be able to keep a hold on them unless you act. If nothing happens, we will lose control".

Brückner became Hitler's adjutant and one of his bodyguards. At the time there were only five men in the personal squad, including Ulrich Graf, Emil Maurice, Christian Weber, and Julius Schaub. Brückner was "well liked" by the men.

On 9 November 1923, Brückner took part in the Beer Hall Putsch in Munich, and upon its failure was found guilty of aiding and abetting high treason. On 1 April 1924, he was sentenced to fifteen months' imprisonment. Pretrial confinement time was deducted from his sentence; he, along with Wilhelm Frick and Ernst Röhm walked out of the courtroom as free men on probation. As soon as they had left the room, the newly freed Brückner shouted to his fellow supporters, "It's up to us now!" He once again took over his old SA regiment's leadership. From 1924 to 1928 he worked as the third general secretary at the Association for the German Community Abroad (Verein für Deutsche Kulturbeziehungen im Ausland/VDA). He was employed as a tennis and ski instructor, as well as a sales representative for sporting goods in Munich from 1927 until 1929 when he found work at the German Foreign Institute in Stuttgart.

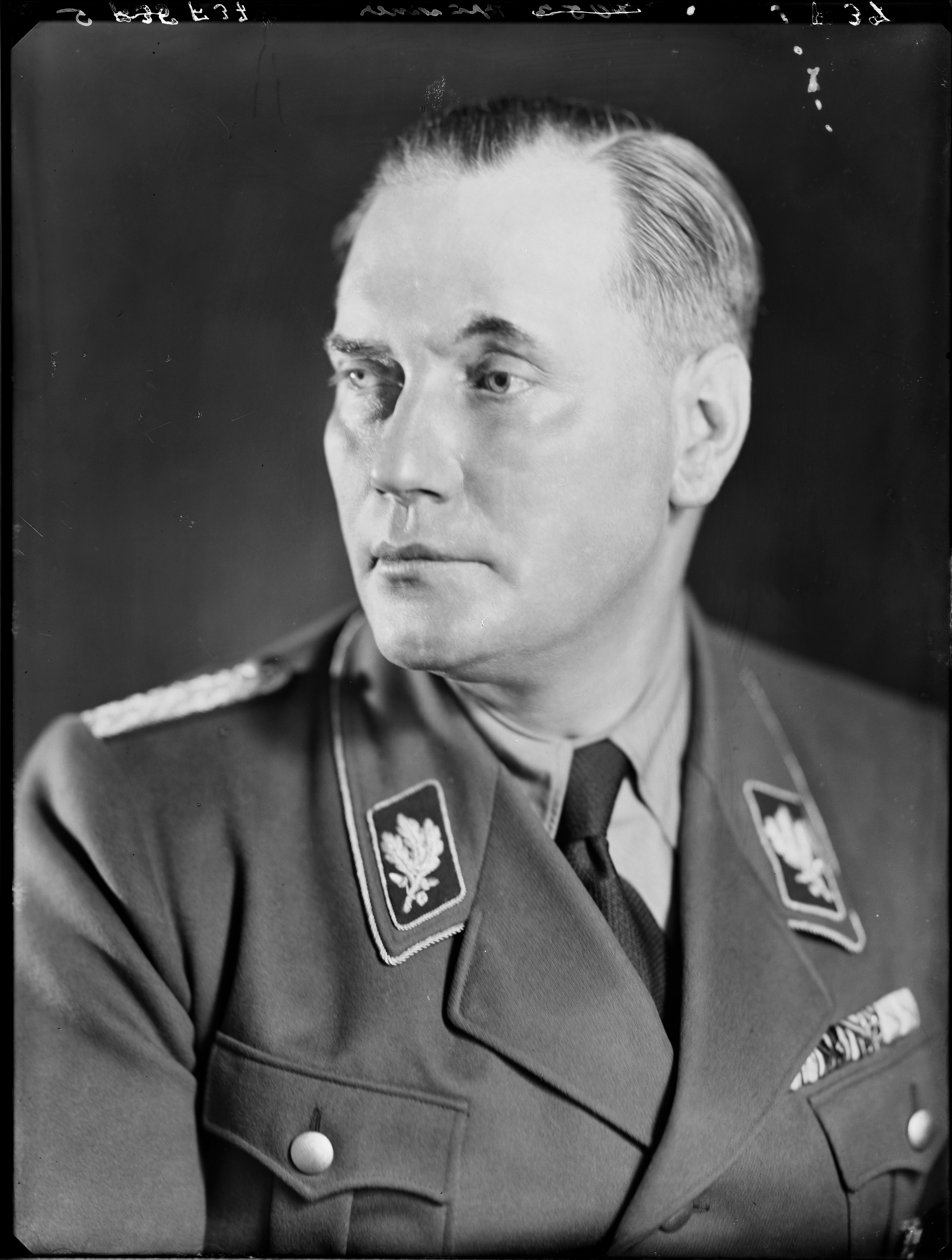
Wilhelm Brückner as Gruppenführer in the Sturmabteilung (SA) 1933–1934 Photo: NARA

On 15 August 1933, while driving behind Hitler's car, he lost control of his vehicle and crashed. He suffered a broken leg, fractured skull and an injury to an eye. Fortunately for him, the driver of the car following Brückner was the physician, Karl Brandt. Brandt drove Brückner to a hospital in Traunstein, where he operated on his skull and removed one of his badly injured eyes. Brandt spent the next six weeks at Brückner's bedside until his condition improved. It was through this action that Brandt later became Hitler's escort doctor.

Brückner was appointed Chief Adjutant to Hitler on 20 February 1934, and retained that role until October 1940. In that role he supervised all of the Führer's personal servants, valets, bodyguards, and adjutants. He thereby counted among those who were in Hitler's innermost personal circle, playing as one of Hitler's closest confidants next to Joseph Goebbels and Sepp Dietrich in the propaganda film Hitler über Deutschland (1932). On 9 November 1934, he was appointed an SA-Obergruppenführer by Hitler.

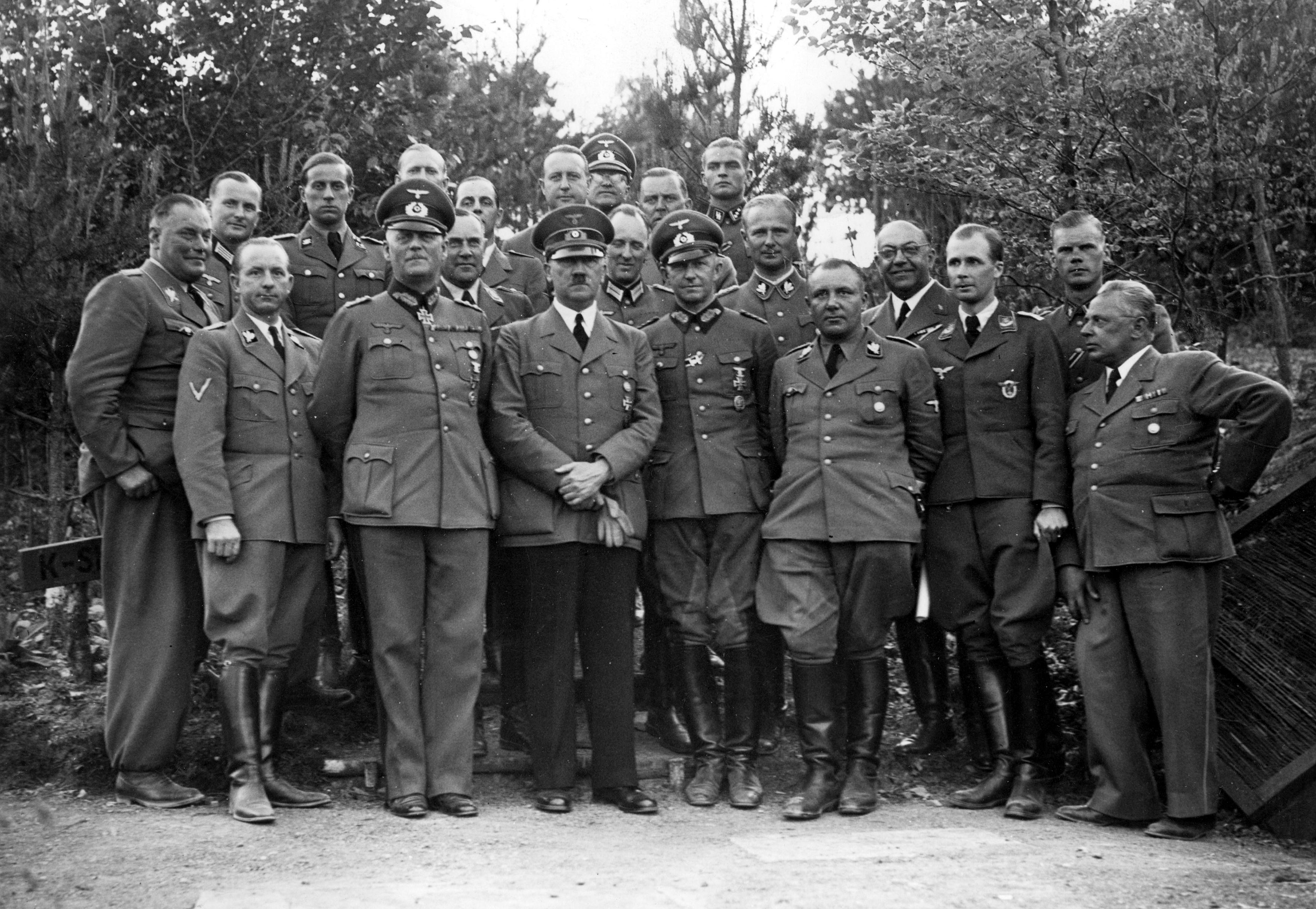
Adolf Hitler and his Staff at Führer's Headquarters Felsennest in June 1940, with Wilhelm Brückner to the far left.

On 15 January 1936, Brückner became an honorary citizen of Detmold. (He was stripped of this honour by the city council on 9 November 1945.) Brückner, although well liked by applicants and everyday visitors at the Reich Chancellery for his straightforwardness and affability, lost ever more importance with the war's outbreak. He was replaced as chief adjutant to Hitler in October 1940 by Julius Schaub. Martin Bormann, then chief of staff in the office for Deputy Führer Rudolf Hess was behind Brückner being replaced by Schaub, who was closer to Bormann. Brückner joined the Heer (army), becoming a colonel by war's end. Between 1945 and 1948, he was interned by U.S. military authorities. During his military trial, Rudolf Diels testified against Brückner, recalling that in 1933, an execution order against a thousand imprisoned communists had been relayed to Diels from Hitler through Brückner. Diels claimed he was able to negotiate against this by conferring with Hitler and Hermann Göring, accusing Brückner, then a superior officer to him, of having failed to do the same in similar instances. On 14 September 1948, Brückner was classified as a major offender, sentenced to three and a half years in a labor camp, and had part of his assets confiscated.

Following his release, Brückner lived alone in Herbsdorf, part of Nußdorf in Bavaria, where he died on 20 August 1954.

== Decorations and awards ==
- Military Merit Cross (Bavaria) 2nd Class with Crown and Swords, 1915
- 1914 Iron Cross 2nd Class, 1917
- 1918 Wound Badge in Black, 1918
- Honour Chevron for the Old Guard, February 1934
- The Honour Cross of the World War 1914/1918 with Swords, 1934
- Blood Order #7, 1934
- Coburg Badge, 1936
- Golden Party Badge, 1938
- Anschluss Medal, 1938
- Sudetenland Medal, 1939
- Memel Medal, 1939
- Clasp to the Sudetenland Medal, 1939
