= Julius Schaub =

Chief Personal Adjutant of Adolf Hitler (1898–1967)

Aide and Adjutant to Adolf Hitler
- In office 1 January 1925 – 30 April 1945
- Leader: Adolf Hitler
- Preceded by: Office established
- Succeeded by: Office abolished

Personal details
- Born: Julius Schaub; 20 August 1898 Munich, Kingdom of Bavaria, German Empire
- Died: 27 December 1967 (aged 69) Munich, Bavaria, West Germany
- Party: Nazi Party

Military service
- Allegiance: German Empire; Nazi Germany
- Branch/service: Imperial German Army; Schutzstaffel
- Years of service: 1917–1918; 1925–1945
- Rank: SS-Obergruppenführer
- Unit: Führerbegleitkommando
- Battles/wars: World War I World War II

Julius Schaub (20 August 1898 – 27 December 1967) was an aide and adjutant to German dictator Adolf Hitler from the 1920s until the dictator's suicide on 30 April 1945.

Born in 1898 in Munich, Bavaria, Schaub served as a field medic during World War I, during which he injured both of his feet. During the hard times which followed the war, Schaub joined the Nazi Party. After losing his job because of his membership, Hitler hired him as his personal aide, a position he held for over 20 years.

Schaub took care of Hitler's personal belongings, papers and travel journeys, making him a trusted figure in Hitler's inner circle. In 1924, he was imprisoned with Hitler for his involvement in the coup d'état attempt of November 1923 in Munich. In time he closely befriended Hitler. He was promoted to the position of chief aide and adjutant to Hitler in October 1940. Later in July 1944, Schaub was not present during the military briefing in a Wolfsschanze barrack in which a bomb exploded in an attempt on Hitler's life, killing four people and injuring twenty others. Schaub was in another building in the complex.

Schaub was ordered to leave the Führerbunker in late April 1945 and destroy all of Hitler's personal belongings and papers. He was arrested by the Americans on 8 May 1945. Schaub died on 27 December 1967 in Munich.

== Early life ==
Julius Schaub was born on 20 August 1898 in Munich, a largely Catholic city in southern Bavaria. On 28 June 1914, Archduke Franz Ferdinand of Austria and his wife were assassinated by a group of Serbian and Bosnian rebels. This triggered the outbreak of World War I in Europe. On 17 January 1917, Schaub was drafted to serve as a field medic in the German Army. According to Traudl Junge, one of Hitler's private secretaries, both of Schaub's feet had been injured in the war, making him semi-handicapped. By the end of the war, Schaub found work as a contract worker at the Munich Central Supply Office.

== Association with Hitler ==
After defeat in World War I, Germany was plunged into bankruptcy, social injustice, poverty, crime and mass unemployment. During the Great Depression, Germany saw the creation of a number of extremist political and paramilitary associations, representing both the far-left and the far-right. Amidst this crisis, Schaub decided to join the National Socialist German Workers’ Party, later commonly known as the Nazi Party, and became member number 81. The political program of the party was essentially a rejection of the terms of the Treaty of Versailles and an embrace of antisemitism and anti-Bolshevism, driven by Adolf Hitler and his world view.

After getting involved with the Nazi Party, Schaub lost his job at the Munich Central Supply Office. Upon hearing the news, Hitler hired him as his personal aide-de-camp. Thereafter, Schaub looked after confidential papers, carried money for Hitler's use and provided both secretary and security duties. He was part of Hitler's small circle of trusted bodyguards.

In 1923, the Nazis felt strong enough to try to seize power in Munich. They decided to march on the city, inspired by Benito Mussolini's successful march on Rome. Known as the Beer Hall Putsch, the coup attempt by Hitler and his paramilitary Sturmabteilung (SA) troops failed to take control of Munich. In the aftermath, Schaub and other Nazis were arrested and incarcerated with Hitler at Landsberg Prison. Schaub was sentenced to 1 1/2 years in prison. He was released on 31 December 1924, 11 days after Hitler's 20 December release. After Hitler left prison, there was an official reformation of the Nazi Party in early 1925. That same year, Hitler ordered the formation of a small new bodyguard unit dedicated to his personal service. It was tasked with providing personal protection for Hitler at party functions and events. Schaub became founding member number seven of the unit, which became known as the Schutzstaffel (SS) and made its first appearance in April.

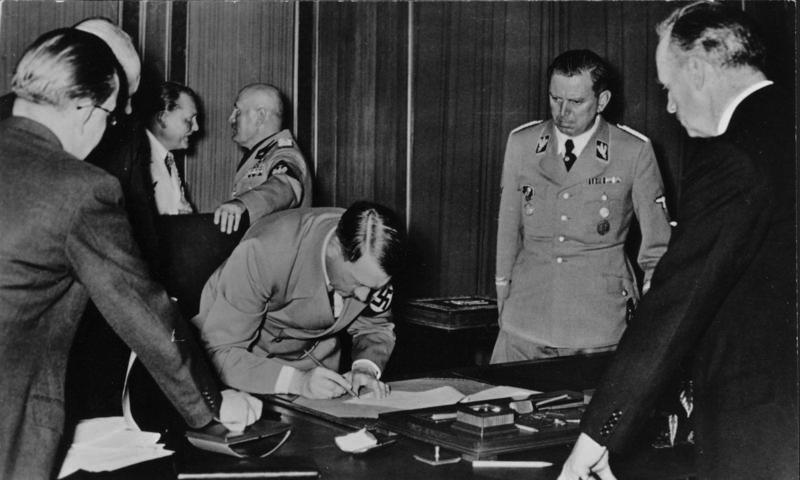
Schaub (on Hitler's left) at the signing of the Munich Agreement, 1938

Schaub continued in the capacity as a personal aide and adjutant for Hitler. A friendship developed, which was evident by Hitler later appearing as a witness at Schaub's second wedding. Traudl Junge states that Schaub considered himself to be an "amazingly important, significant person" to the Nazi cause. The Luftwaffe chief Reichsmarschall Hermann Göring, who gave humorous nicknames to almost all in Hitler's inner circle, dubbed Schaub the Reisemarschal ("Travel Marshal") as he typically took care of Hitler's traveling arrangements and often accompanied him. On automobile trips, Schaub was one of the men who was allowed to travel regularly in Hitler's personal motorcar. He later became Hitler's chief aide and adjutant (Chefadjutant des Führers) in October 1940, replacing Wilhelm Brückner. Martin Bormann, then chief of staff in the office for Deputy Führer Rudolf Hess, was behind Brückner being replaced by Schaub, who was closer to Bormann. Bormann calculated this would lead Schaub to support him as he gained power and he also believed Schaub could be manipulated. Part of Schaub's duties was to give day-to-day operational orders to Hitler's personal protection chief, Johann Rattenhuber of the Reichssicherheitsdienst (Reich Security Service; RSD). He was also allowed to use RSD guards for errands and runner services. In 1943, he was promoted to his final rank of SS-Obergruppenführer. As Hitler disliked change in personnel and liked to keep familiar faces around him, Schaub remained in Hitler's staff for over 20 years. Jochen von Lang described Schaub as one of Hitler's "all-purpose companions from way back". In addition to his service on Hitler's personal staff, Schaub was elected as a deputy to the Reichstag in March 1936 from electoral constituency 24 Upper Bavaria-Swabia, a seat he retained until the end of the Nazi regime.

=== 20 July 1944 plot ===
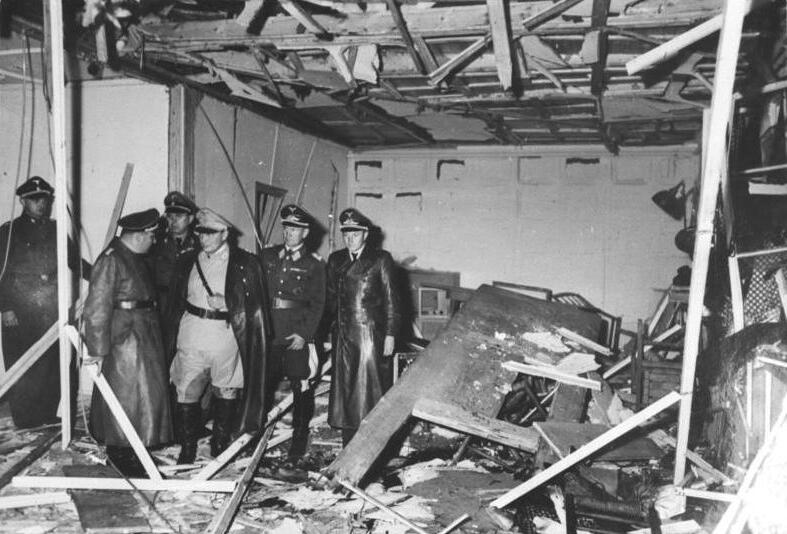
The shattered conference room shortly after the explosion, 1944

Later during World War II, with Germany suffering major defeat on all fronts, Colonel Claus von Stauffenberg and his fellow conspirators decided to eliminate Hitler and the Nazi leadership, establish a new government and save Germany from total destruction. Stauffenberg had his opportunity on 20 July 1944 at a military briefing at Hitler's East Prussian headquarters known as the Wolf's Lair (Wolfsschanze). He managed to get through security and plant a briefcase bomb under the conference table. The bomb exploded, fatally wounding three officers and a stenographer who died shortly thereafter. Schaub was in another building at the time of the explosion. He rushed over to find Hitler, who survived with only minor injuries, as did other men present, who were shielded from the bomb blast by the conference table leg.

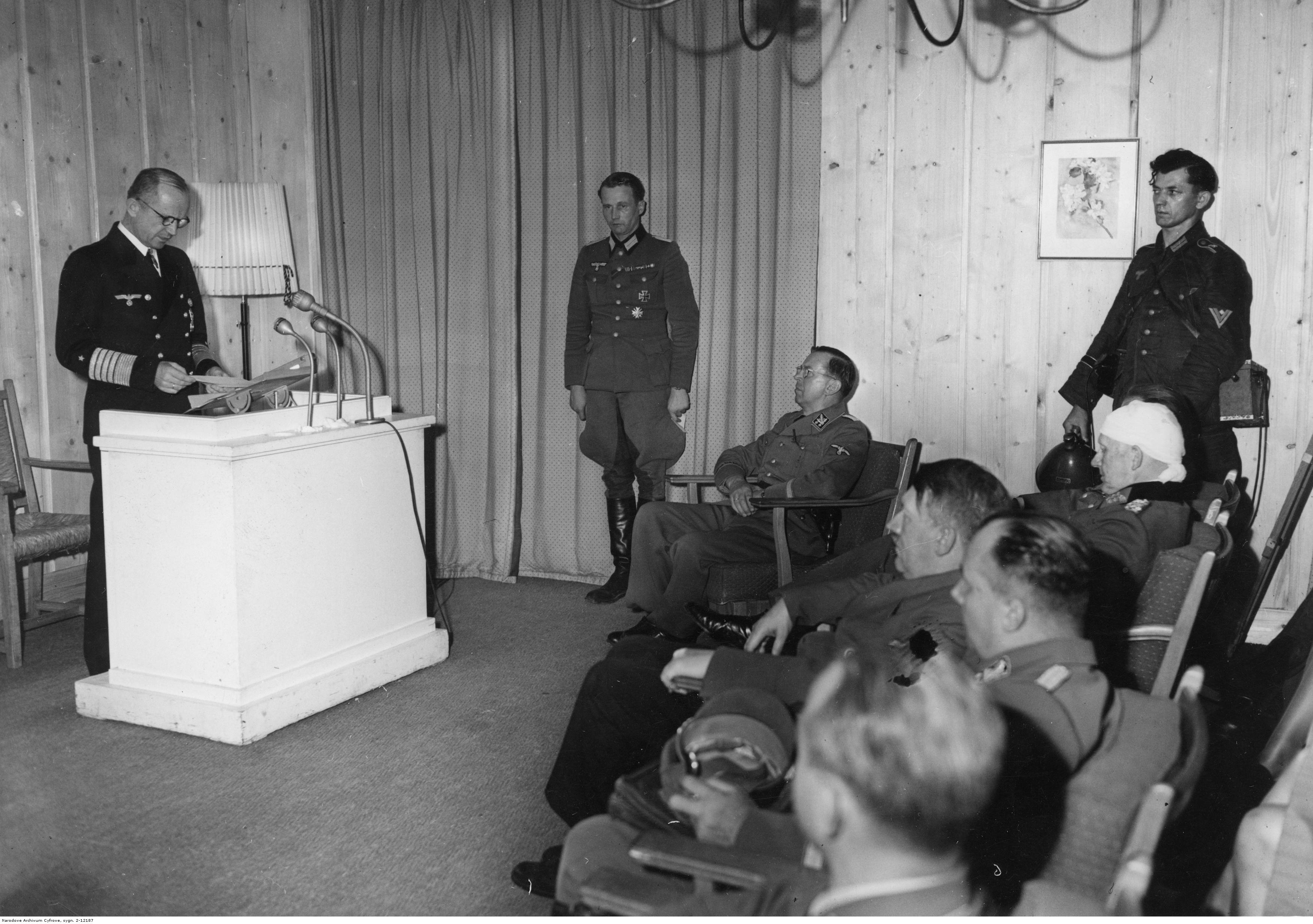
Admiral Karl Doenitz giving a radio speech after the attempt on Adolf Hitler's life. 21 July 1944. Schaub in the middle.

In the aftermath of the event, Hitler had a badge struck to honor all those injured or killed in the explosion; the "20 July Wound Badge". Those present at the conference later said that Schaub falsely tried to claim he was injured so as to qualify for the badge.

=== 1945 ===
In January 1945, Hitler and his staff relocated to the Führerbunker in Berlin. During the Battle of Berlin midday conference of 22 April, Hitler declared – for the first time – that the war was lost. Hitler ordered Schaub to burn all of the documents from his safe in the bunker and two safes in the Reich Chancellery. Schaub performed the task on 22 or 23 April 1945. In the next several days, Hitler ordered much of his personal staff to leave Berlin. Hitler also ordered Schaub to burn the contents of the dictator's personal safes in Munich and at the Berghof on the Obersalzberg. His final act as aide and adjutant was to destroy Hitler's personal train, the Führersonderzug, in Austria.

== Post-war and death ==
After the war, while possessing false identification papers and introducing himself as "Josef Huber", Schaub was arrested by American troops on 8 May 1945 in Kitzbühel, and remained in custody until 17 February 1949. Ultimately, Schaub was classified by denazification investigators as being only a "fellow traveler" and was not accused or associated with any war crimes. Schaub died on 27 December 1967 in his hometown, Munich. Traudl Junge described Schaub in her memoirs as "extremely kind, but very curious too". She further notes that "for historical purposes, it's not worth saying much about him".

== See also ==
- Heinz Linge
- Hans Hermann Junge
- Register of SS leaders in general's rank
