= Beer Hall Putsch =

Failed 1923 Nazi coup attempt in Munich, Germany

- Part of political violence in Germany (1918–1933)
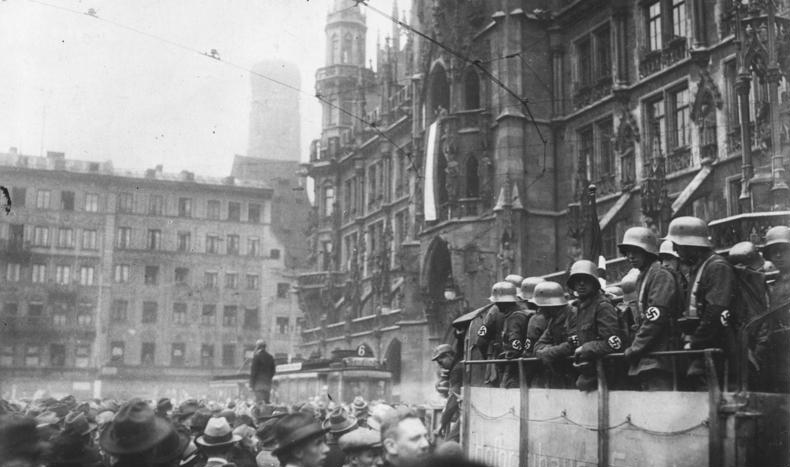
- Nazis at the Marienplatz in Munich during the Putsch
Date	8–9 November 1923
Location	Bürgerbräukeller, Munich, Bavaria, Weimar Republic 48.130°N 11.592°E
Action	Hitler and the Nazi Party planned to seize Munich and use the city as a base for a march against Germany's national government.
Result	German government victory

Belligerents
Kampfbund: Nazi Party; Sturmabteilung; Stoßtrupp-Hitler; Bund Reichskriegsflagge; Freikorps Oberland	Weimar Republic: Bavarian State Police; Reichswehr

Commanders and leaders
Adolf Hitler (WIA); Erich Ludendorff; Ernst Röhm; Rudolf Hess; Ernst Pöhner; Max Erwin von Scheubner-Richter †; Robert Heinrich Wagner; Hermann Göring (WIA); Heinrich Himmler	Eugen von Knilling; Gustav Ritter von Kahr; Hans von Seisser; Otto von Lossow; Jakob von Danner; Friedrich Kress von Kressenstein

Military support
2,000+	130

Casualties and losses
15 killed About a dozen injured Many captured and imprisoned	4 killed Several wounded
- 1 civilian killed

The Beer Hall Putsch, also known as the Munich Putsch, (Note: Meaning "beer hall coup" or "Munich coup"; also known in German as the Hitlerputsch, Hitler–Ludendorff-Putsch, Bürgerbräu-Putsch or Marsch auf die Feldherrnhalle) was a failed coup d'état led by Nazi Party leader Adolf Hitler, General Erich Ludendorff, and other Kampfbund leaders in Munich, Bavaria, on 8–9 November 1923, during the Weimar Republic. Inspired by Benito Mussolini's March on Rome, Hitler's goal was to use Munich as a base for a march against Germany's national government in Berlin.

The putsch began on the evening of 8 November, when Hitler and a contingent of approximately 600 Sturmabteilung (SA) members marched on the beer hall Bürgerbräukeller, where Gustav Ritter von Kahr — the Minister-President of Bavaria who had banned some of Hitler's previous planned gatherings — was delivering a speech. As the SA surrounded the hall, Hitler entered, fired a shot into the ceiling, and claimed that the Bavarian government had been overthrown and that the national revolution had begun. The following day, approximately 2,000 Nazis marched on the Feldherrnhalle, in the city centre, but were confronted by a police cordon, which resulted in the deaths of 15 Nazis, four police officers, and one bystander. Hitler escaped immediate arrest and was spirited off to safety in the countryside. After two days, he was arrested and charged with treason.

The putsch brought Hitler to the attention of the German nation for the first time and generated front-page headlines in newspapers around the world. His arrest was followed by a 24-day trial, which was widely publicised and gave him a platform to express his nationalist sentiments. Hitler was found guilty of treason and sentenced to five years in Landsberg Prison, (Note: Hitler's Festungshaft ("fortress confinement"). Hitler's sentence was to be served in the mildest form of incarceration under German law.) where he dictated Mein Kampf to fellow prisoners Emil Maurice and Rudolf Hess. On 20 December 1924, having served only nine months, Hitler was released. Once released, Hitler redirected his focus toward obtaining power through legal means rather than revolution or force, and accordingly changed his tactics, further developing Nazi propaganda.

== Background ==
In the early 20th century, many of the larger cities of southern Germany had beer halls, where hundreds, and sometimes thousands, of people would socialise in the evenings, drink beer and participate in political and social debates. Such beer halls also became the hosts of occasional political rallies. One of Munich's largest beer halls was the Bürgerbräukeller, which became the site where the putsch began.

After the Treaty of Versailles, which ended World War I, Germany declined as a major European power. Like many Germans of the period, Hitler, who had fought in the German Army but still held Austrian citizenship at the time, believed the treaty to be a betrayal, with the country having been "stabbed in the back" by its own government, particularly as the German Army was popularly thought to have been undefeated in the field. For the defeat, Hitler scapegoated civilian leaders, Jews and Marxists, later called the "November Criminals".

Hitler remained in the army in Munich after the war. He participated in various "national thinking" courses, organised by the Education and Propaganda Department of the Bavarian Army under Captain Karl Mayr, of which Hitler became an agent. Captain Mayr ordered Hitler, then an army Gefreiter (not the equivalent of lance corporal, but a special class of private) and holder of the Iron Cross, First Class, to infiltrate the tiny Deutsche Arbeiterpartei ("German Workers' Party", abbreviated DAP). Hitler joined the DAP on 12 September 1919. He soon realised that he was in agreement with many of the underlying tenets of the DAP, and rose to its top post in the ensuing chaotic political atmosphere of postwar Munich. By agreement, Hitler assumed the political leadership of a number of Bavarian revanchist "patriotic associations", called the Kampfbund. This political base extended to include about 15,000 members of the Sturmabteilung (SA, literally "Storm Detachment"), the paramilitary wing of the NSDAP.

On 26 September 1923, following a period of terror and political violence, Bavarian Prime Minister Eugen von Knilling declared a state of emergency, and Gustav Ritter von Kahr was appointed Staatskomissar ("state commissioner"), with dictatorial powers to govern the state. Along with von Kahr, Bavarian state police chief Colonel Hans Ritter von Seisser and Reichswehr General Otto von Lossow formed a ruling triumvirate. Hitler announced that he would hold 14 mass meetings beginning on 27 September 1923. Afraid of the potential disruption, one of Kahr's first actions was to ban the announced meetings, placing Hitler under pressure to act. The Nazis, with other leaders in the Kampfbund, felt they had to march upon Berlin and seize power or their followers would turn to the communists. Hitler enlisted the help of World War I general Erich Ludendorff in an attempt to gain the support of Kahr and his triumvirate. However, Kahr had his own plan with Seisser and Lossow to install a nationalist dictatorship without Hitler.

== The putsch ==
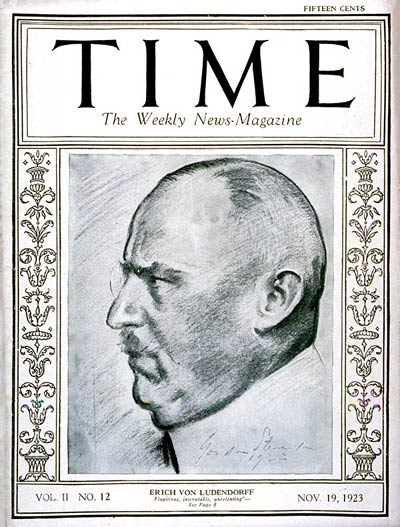
Erich Ludendorff on the cover of Time, 19 November 1923

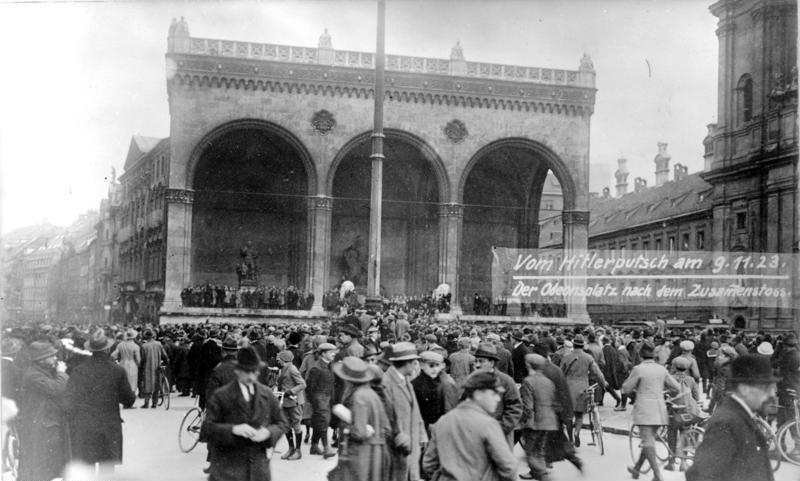
Odeonsplatz in Munich, 9 November

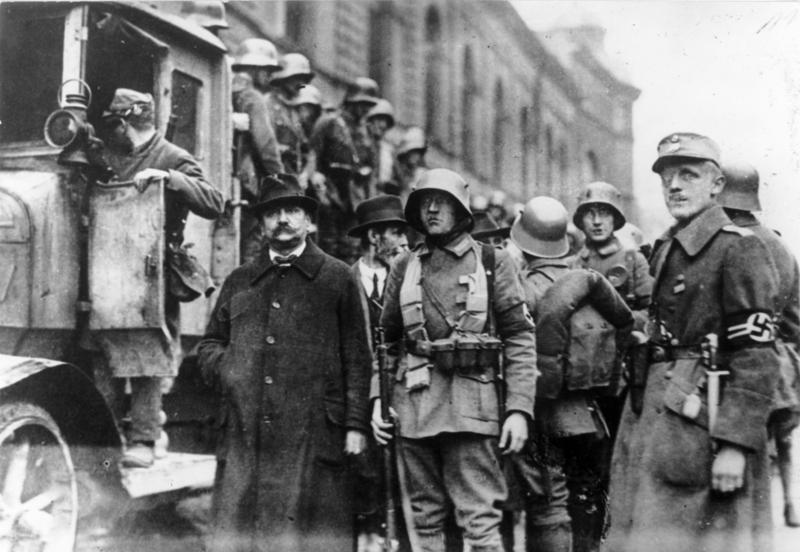
Early Nazis who participated in the attempt to seize power during the 1923 Putsch

The putsch was inspired by Benito Mussolini's successful March on Rome. From 22 to 29 October 1922, Hitler and his associates planned to use Munich as a base for a march against Germany's Weimar Republic government, but circumstances differed from those in Italy. Hitler came to the realisation that Kahr sought to control him and was not ready to act against the government in Berlin. Hitler wanted to seize a critical moment for successful popular agitation and support. He decided to take matters into his own hands. Hitler, along with a large detachment of SA, marched on the Bürgerbräukeller, where Kahr was making a speech in front of 3,000 people.

On the evening of 8 November 1923, 603 SA surrounded the beer hall and a machine gun was set up in the auditorium. Hitler, surrounded by his associates Hermann Göring, Alfred Rosenberg, Rudolf Hess, Ernst Hanfstaengl, Ulrich Graf, Johann Aigner, Adolf Lenk, Max Amann, Max Erwin von Scheubner-Richter, Wilhelm Adam, Robert Wagner and others (some 20 in all), advanced through the crowded auditorium. Unable to be heard above the crowd, Hitler fired a shot into the ceiling and jumped on a chair, yelling: "The national revolution has broken out! The hall is surrounded by six hundred men. Nobody is allowed to leave." He went on to state that the Bavarian government was deposed and declared the formation of a new government with Ludendorff.

Hitler, accompanied by Hess, Lenk, and Graf, ordered the triumvirate of Kahr, Seisser and Lossow into an adjoining room at gunpoint and demanded they support the putsch and accept the government positions he assigned them. Hitler had promised Lossow a few days earlier that he would not attempt a coup, but now thought that he would get an immediate response of affirmation from them, imploring Kahr to accept the position of Regent of Bavaria. Kahr replied that he could not be expected to collaborate, especially as he had been taken out of the auditorium under heavy guard.

Heinz Pernet, Johann Aigner and Scheubner-Richter were dispatched to pick up Ludendorff, whose personal prestige was being harnessed to give the Nazis credibility. A telephone call was made from the kitchen by Hermann Kriebel to Ernst Röhm, who was waiting with his Bund Reichskriegsflagge in the Löwenbräukeller, another beer hall, and he was ordered to seize key buildings throughout the city. At the same time, co-conspirators under Gerhard Rossbach mobilised the students of a nearby infantry officers' school to seize other objectives.

Hitler became irritated by Kahr and summoned Ernst Pöhner, Friedrich Weber, and Hermann Kriebel to stand in for him while he returned to the auditorium flanked by Rudolf Hess and Adolf Lenk. He followed up on Göring's speech and stated that the action was not directed at the police and Reichswehr, but against "the Berlin Jew government and the November criminals of 1918". Dr. Karl Alexander von Mueller, a professor of modern history and political science at the Ludwig-Maximilians-Universität München and a supporter of Kahr, was an eyewitness. He reported:

I cannot remember in my entire life such a change in the attitude of a crowd in a few minutes, almost a few seconds [...] Hitler had turned them inside out, as one turns a glove inside out, with a few sentences. It had almost something of hocus-pocus, or magic about it.

Hitler ended his speech with: "Outside are Kahr, Lossow and Seisser. They are struggling hard to reach a decision. May I say to them that you will stand behind them?"

The crowd in the hall backed Hitler with a roar of approval. He finished:

You can see that what motivates us is neither self-conceit nor self-interest, but only a burning desire to join the battle in this grave eleventh hour for our German Fatherland [...] One last thing I can tell you. Either the German revolution begins tonight, or we will all be dead by dawn!

Hitler, Ludendorff, et al., returned to the main hall's podium, where they gave speeches and shook hands. Kahr spoke first, announcing to applause that he had agreed to serve Bavaria as regent for the monarchy. Hitler declared that he would direct the policy of the new Reich government, and clasped Kahr's hand. The crowd was then allowed to leave the hall. In a tactical mistake, Hitler decided to leave the Bürgerbräukeller shortly thereafter to deal with a crisis elsewhere. Around 22:30, Ludendorff released Kahr and his associates.

The Bund Oberland, under the command of Max Ritter von Müller, was sent to seize weapons from the Army Engineer Barracks under the pretence of performing training manoeuvres. Oskar Cantzler, captain of the 1st company of the 7th Engineer Battalion, did not believe them but allowed them to perform the manoeuvres inside the building. He locked the building with the 400 men inside and positioned two machine guns at the entrance. Hitler attempted to have the men released, but Cantzler refused. Hitler considered using artillery to destroy the building, but chose not to.

The night was marked by confusion and unrest among government officials, armed forces, police units, and individuals deciding where their loyalties lay. Units of the Kampfbund were scurrying around to arm themselves from secret caches and seizing buildings. Around 03:00, the first casualties of the putsch occurred when the local garrison of the Reichswehr spotted Röhm's men coming out of the beer hall. They were ambushed while trying to reach the Reichswehr barracks by soldiers and state police; shots were fired, but there were no fatalities on either side. Encountering heavy resistance, Röhm and his men were forced to fall back. In the meantime, the Reichswehr officers put the whole garrison on alert and called for reinforcements.

In the morning, Hitler ordered the seizure of the Munich city council as hostages.

By mid-morning on 9 November, Hitler realised that the putsch was going nowhere. The putschists did not know what to do and were about to give up. At this moment, Ludendorff cried out, "Wir marschieren!" ("We will march!"). Röhm's force, together with Hitler's (a total of approximately 2000 men), marched out – but with no specific destination. On the spur of the moment, Ludendorff led them to the Bavarian Defence Ministry. However, at the Odeonsplatz in front of the Feldherrnhalle, they met a force of 130 soldiers blocking the way under the command of State Police Senior Lieutenant Michael von Godin. The two groups exchanged fire, which resulted in the deaths of 16 Nazis, four police officers, and one bystander.

Their defeat by the government forces forced Hitler and Ludendorff to flee, Hitler would be driven by Ernst Hanfstaengl to Uffing while Ludendorff would flee to Munich. It was the origin of the Blutfahne ('blood flag'), which was stained with the blood of two SA members who were shot: the flag bearer Heinrich Trambauer, who was badly wounded, and Andreas Bauriedl, who fell dead onto the fallen flag. A bullet killed Scheubner-Richter. Göring was shot in the leg, but escaped. The rest of the Nazis scattered or were arrested. Hitler was arrested two days later.

In a description of Ludendorff's funeral at the Feldherrnhalle in 1937 (which Hitler attended but without speaking) William L. Shirer wrote: "The World War [One] hero [Ludendorff] had refused to have anything to do with him [Hitler] ever since he had fled from in front of the Feldherrnhalle after the volley of bullets during the Beer Hall Putsch." However, when a consignment of papers relating to Landsberg Prison (including the visitor book) was later sold at auction, it was noted that Ludendorff had visited Hitler a number of times. The case of the resurfacing papers was reported in Der Spiegel on 23 June 2006; the new information (which came out more than 30 years after Shirer wrote his book, and which Shirer did not have access to) nullifies Shirer's statement.

=== Counterattack ===
Police units were first notified of trouble by three police detectives stationed at the Löwenbräukeller. These reports reached Major Sigmund von Imhoff of the state police. He immediately called all his Grüne Polizei units and had them seize the central telegraph office and the telephone exchange, although his most important act was to notify Major-General Jakob von Danner, the Reichswehr city commandant of Munich. As a proud war hero, Danner loathed the "little corporal" and those "Freikorps bands of rowdies". He also did not much like his commanding officer, Generalleutnant Otto von Lossow, "a sorry figure of a man". He was determined to put down the putsch with or without Lossow. Danner set up a command post at the 19th Infantry Regiment barracks and alerted all military units.

Meanwhile, Captain Karl Wild, learning of the putsch from marchers, mobilised his command to guard Kahr's government building, the Commissariat, with orders to shoot.

Around 23:00, Major-General von Danner, along with fellow generals Adolf Ritter von Ruith and Friedrich Freiherr Kress von Kressenstein, compelled Lossow to repudiate the putsch.

There was one member of the cabinet who was not at the Bürgerbräukeller: Franz Matt, the vice-premier and minister of education and culture. A staunchly conservative Roman Catholic, he was having dinner with the Archbishop of Munich, Cardinal Michael von Faulhaber, and with the Nuncio to Bavaria, Archbishop Eugenio Pacelli (who would later become Pope Pius XII), when he learned of the putsch. He immediately telephoned Kahr. When he found the man vacillating and unsure, Matt made plans to set up a rump government-in-exile in Regensburg and composed a proclamation calling upon all police officers, members of the armed forces, and civil servants to remain loyal to the government. The action of these few men spelt doom for those attempting the putsch. The next day the archbishop and Rupprecht visited Kahr and persuaded him to repudiate Hitler.

Three thousand students from the Ludwig-Maximilians-Universität München rioted and marched to the Feldherrnhalle to lay wreaths. They continued to riot until 9 November, when they learned of Hitler's arrest. Kahr and Lossow were called Judases and traitors.

== Trial and prison ==
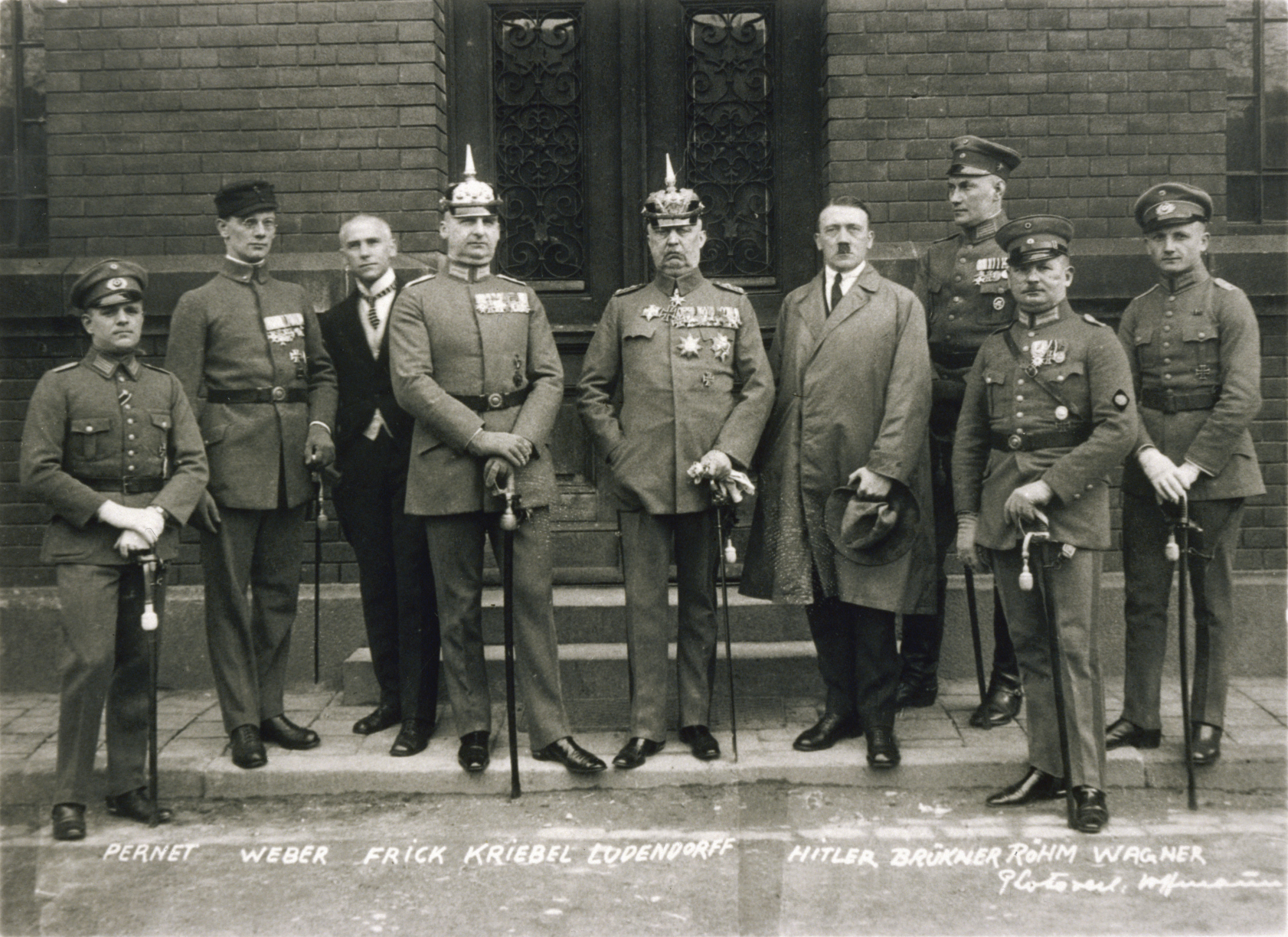
1 April 1924. Defendants in the Beer Hall Putsch trial. From left to right: Pernet, Weber, Frick, Kriebel, Ludendorff, Hitler, Bruckner, Röhm, and Wagner. Only two of the defendants (Hitler and Frick) were wearing civilian clothes. All those in uniform were carrying swords, indicating officer status.

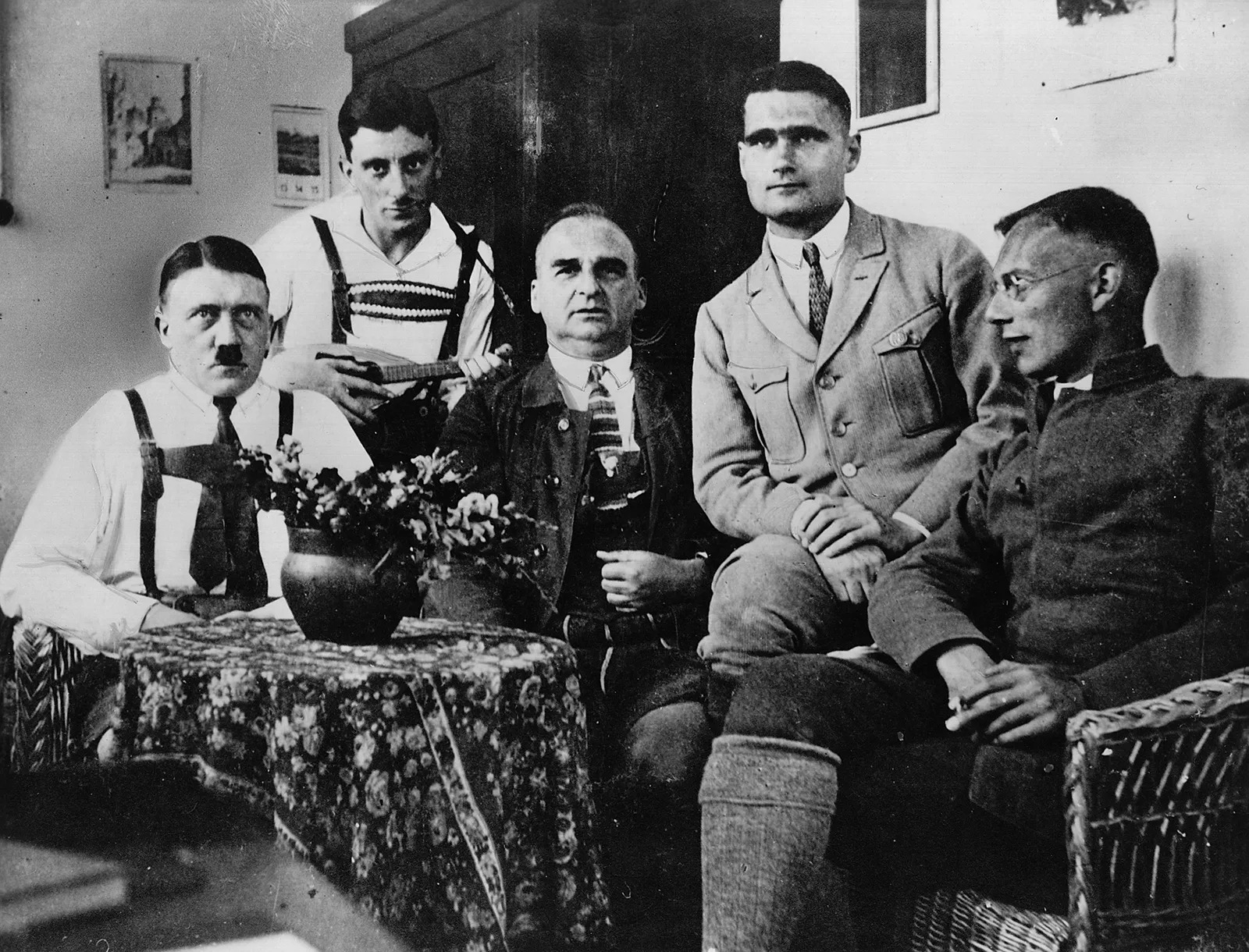
Adolf Hitler, Emil Maurice, Hermann Kriebel, Rudolf Hess, and Friedrich Weber at Landsberg Prison

Two days after the putsch, Hitler was arrested and he, Ludendorff, Hermann Kriebel, Wilhelm Frick, Ernst Pöhner, Ernst Röhm, Friedrick Weber, Wilhelm Bruckner and Robert Wagner were charged with high treason in the special People's Court along with Heinz Pernet being charged as an accessory. Some of his fellow conspirators, including Rudolf Hess, were also arrested, while others, including Hermann Göring and Ernst Hanfstaengl, escaped to Austria. The Nazi Party's headquarters was raided, and its newspaper, the Völkischer Beobachter (The People's Observer), was banned. In January 1924, the Emminger Reform, an emergency decree, abolished the jury as trier of fact and replaced it with a mixed system of judges and lay judges in Germany's judiciary.

This was not the first time Hitler had been in trouble with the law. In an incident in September 1921, he and some men of the SA had disrupted a meeting of the Bayernbund ("Bavaria Union") which Otto Ballerstedt, a Bavarian federalist, was to have addressed, and the Nazi troublemakers were arrested as a result. Hitler ended up serving just over a month of a three-month jail sentence. Judge Georg Neithardt was the presiding judge at both of Hitler's trials.

Hitler's trial began on 26 February 1924 and lasted until 1 April 1924. Lossow acted as chief witness for the prosecution and Karl Kohl as defence lawyer. Hitler began with a nearly 4 hour long opening speech which began with him telling his life story before he shifted to discussing his political vision with a large focus on criticism of racial minorities, communism, the Weimar Republic and the Bavarian leaders who turned on him. He claimed the putsch had been solely his responsibility, inspiring the title Führer or "leader". After this, Hitler would moderate his tone for the trial, dropping his usual anti-Semitism. The lay judges were fanatically pro-Nazi and had to be dissuaded by the presiding Judge, Georg Neithardt, from acquitting Hitler outright. The other nine defendants would follow with their own opening statements with little interruption from Neithardt. Ernst Röhm testified: "I still cannot comprehend that I should have to defend myself for a deed that seemed so natural to me".

After 6 days of opening statements, the witnesses first took to the stand on 4 March with various police and government officials testifying. Neithardt would make it clear that personal attacks on Bavarian leaders were out of bounds and wished to protect their reputations. All three Bavarian leaders testified. Lossow testified first, criticising Hitler for not trying to fix the government in Berlin through legal and constitutional means. Kahr testified next, saying that the putsch could have been a staggering catastrophe for the country. Seisser testified last, calling Hitler "a young man who let the applause of crowds get to his head" and saying that Hitler had set back the nationalist cause by years. Hitler presented his closing statement on 27 March and said that "his goal was to be the destroyer of Marxism and just as a bird would sing because he is a bird, he had to engage in politics". Hitler's closing statement brought a number of people in the courtroom to tears and he ended by saying: "For it is not you, gentlemen, who pronounce judgment upon us. Instead, the judgment of the eternal court of history will pronounce against this prosecution which has been raised against us".

Hitler, Kreibel, Pöhner and Weber were all sentenced to five years in Festungshaft ("fortress confinement") for treason with parole eligibility in six months, the absolute minimum sentence. Festungshaft was the mildest of the three types of jail sentence available in German law at the time; it excluded forced labour, provided reasonably comfortable cells, and allowed the prisoner to receive visitors almost daily for many hours. This was the customary sentence for those whom the judge believed to have had honourable but misguided motives, and it did not carry the stigma of a sentence of Gefängnis (common prison) or Zuchthaus (disciplinary prison). Except for Ludendorff, the remaining five defendants (Brückner, Frick, Pernet, Röhm and Wagner) were found guilty of abetting high treason and sentenced to 15 months in prison, minus time served. They were freed and placed on parole until 1 April 1928. Due to Ludendorff's story that he was present by accident, an explanation he had also used in the Kapp Putsch, along with his war service and connections, he was acquitted.

Although the trial was the first time that Hitler's oratory was insufficient, he used the trial as an opportunity to spread his ideas by giving speeches in the courtroom. The event was extensively covered in the newspapers the next day. The judges were impressed (Presiding Judge Neithardt was inclined to favouritism towards the defendants prior to the trial), and as a result, Hitler served just over eight months in prison and was fined 500 ℛ︁ℳ︁. Prison officials allegedly wanted to give Hitler deaf guards, to prevent him from persuading them to free him. In December 1924, he was granted early release for good behaviour. Göring, meanwhile, had fled after suffering a bullet wound to his leg, which led him to become increasingly dependent on morphine and other painkilling drugs. This addiction continued throughout his life.

One of Hitler's greatest worries at the trial was that he was at risk of being deported back to his native Austria by the Bavarian government. The trial judge, Neithardt, was sympathetic toward Hitler and held that the relevant laws of the Weimar Republic could not be applied to a man "who thinks and feels like a German, as Hitler does." The result was that the Nazi leader remained in Germany. (Note: The court explained why it rejected the deportation of Hitler under the terms of the Protection of the Republic Act: "Hitler is a German-Austrian. He considered himself to be a German. In the opinion of the court, the meaning and the terms of section 9, para II of the Law for the Protection of the Republic cannot apply to a man who thinks and feels as German as Hitler, who voluntarily served for four and a half years in the German army at war, who attained high military honours through outstanding bravery in the face of the enemy, was wounded, suffered other damage to his health, and was released from the military into the control of the district Command Munich I.")

Though Hitler failed to achieve his immediate goal, the putsch did give the Nazis their first national attention and propaganda victory. While serving their "fortress confinement" sentences at Landsberg am Lech, Hitler, Emil Maurice and Rudolf Hess wrote Mein Kampf. The putsch had changed Hitler's outlook on violent revolution to effect change. From then his modus operandi was to do everything "strictly legal".

The process of "combination", wherein the conservative-nationalist-monarchist group thought that its members could piggyback on, and control the National Socialist movement to garner the seats of power, was to repeat itself ten years later in 1933 when Franz von Papen asked Hitler to form a legal coalition government.

== Fatalities ==
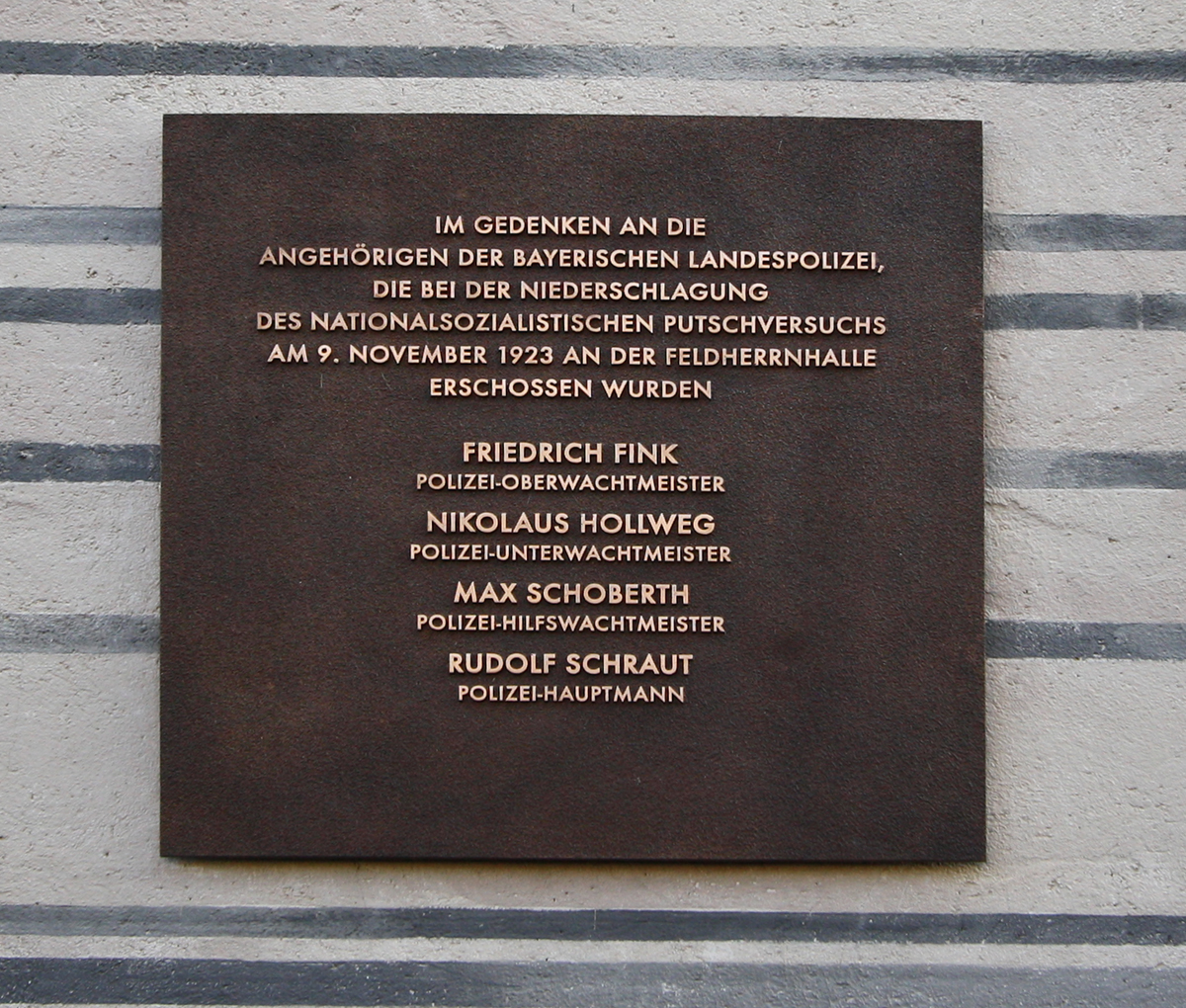
Plaque erected on 9 November 2010, at the Munich Residence, commemorating the 4 officers killed

=== Bavarian police officers ===
- Friedrich Fink (23 April 1887 – 9 November 1923)
- Nikolaus Hollweg (15 May 1897 – 9 November 1923)
- Max Schoberth (1902 or 1903 – 9 November 1923)
- Rudolf Schraut (4 July 1886 – 9 November 1923)

=== Putschists ===
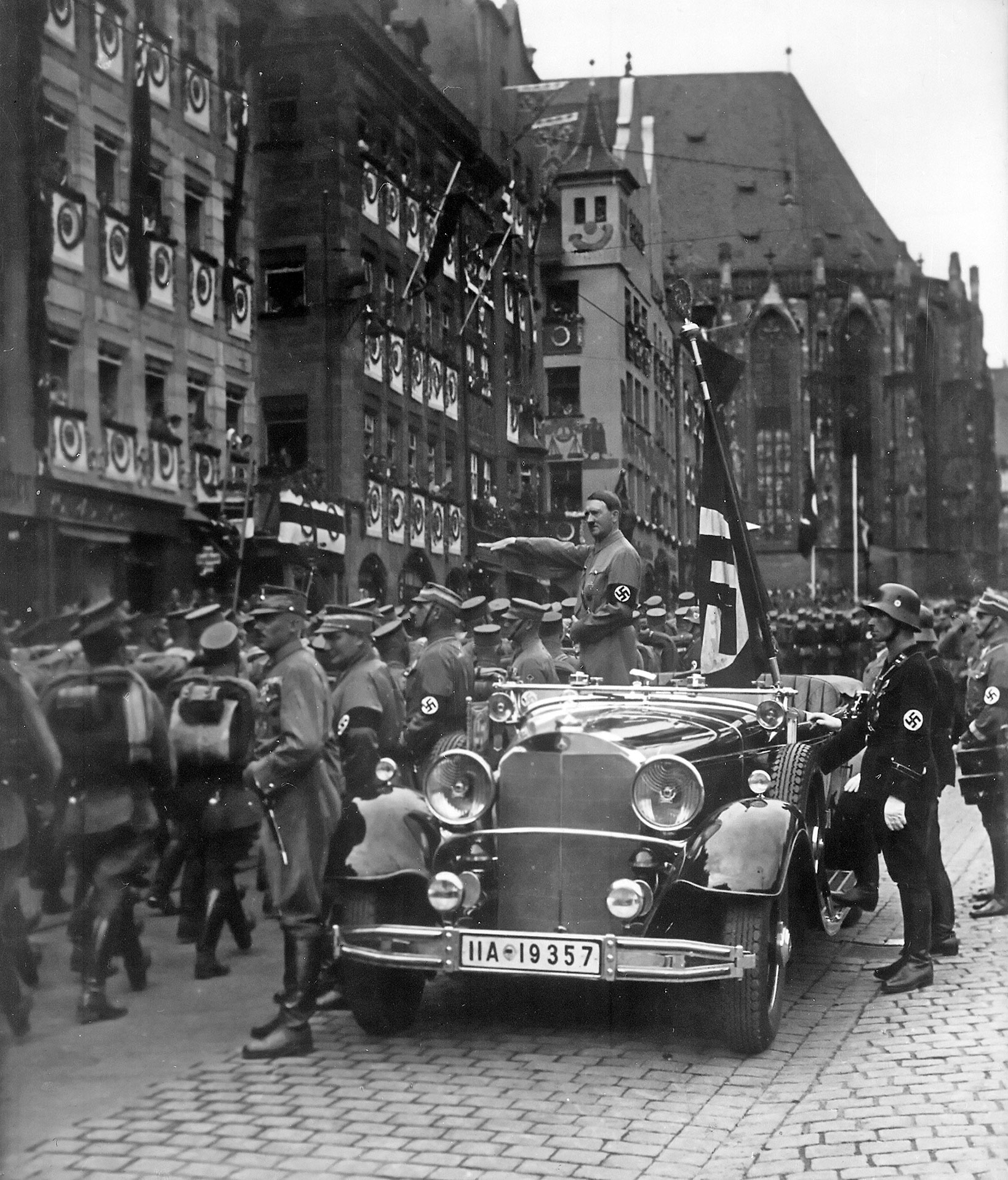
Adolf Hitler reviewing SA members in 1935. He is accompanied by the Blutfahne ("blood flag") and its bearer SS-Sturmbannführer Jakob Grimminger.

The 15 deceased are listed in Hitler's dedication to Mein Kampf:

- Felix Allfarth, merchant, born 5 July 1901 in Leipzig. Alfarth had studied merchandising at the Siemens-Schuckert Works and moved to Munich in 1923 to begin his career.
- Andreas Bauriedl, hatter and World War I veteran, born 4 May 1879 in Aschaffenburg. Bauriedl was hit in the abdomen, killing him and causing him to fall on the Nazi flag, which had fallen to the ground when its flagbearer, Heinrich Trambauer, was severely wounded. Bauriedl's blood-soaked flag later became the Nazi relic known as the Blutfahne. Member of the Nazi Party.
- Theodor Casella, bank clerk and World War I veteran, born 8 August 1900 in Munich. Member of the Freikorps and Nazi Party.
- Wilhelm Ehrlich, bank clerk and World War I veteran, born 8 August 1894 in Głowno. Member of the Freikorps and Nazi Party. Previous participant in the Kapp Putsch.
- Martin Faust, bank clerk and World War I veteran, born 4 January 1901 in Hemau.
- Anton Hechenberger, locksmith, born 28 September 1902 in Munich. Member of the Nazi Party and Sturmabteilung.
- Oskar Körner, businessman and World War I veteran, born 4 January 1875 in Oberpeilau. Member of the German Workers' Party and Nazi Party.
- Karl Laforce, engineering student, born 28 October 1904; the youngest to die in the putsch. Member of the Nazi Party, Sturmabteilung, and Stoßtrupp-Hitler.
- Kurt Neubauer, valet for Erich Ludendorff and World War I veteran, born 27 March 1899 in Hopfengarten, Kreis Bromberg. Member of the Freikorps.
- Klaus von Pape, businessman, born 16 August 1904 in Oschatz.
- Theodor von der Pfordten, judge and World War I veteran, born 14 May 1873 in Bayreuth. Member of the German National People's Party. During his time as the commandant of a prisoner of war camp in Traunstein, Pfordten was implicated in the abuse of prisoners of war, particularly Russians.
- Johann Rickmers, retired cavalry captain and World War I veteran; born 7 May 1881 in Bremen. Member of the Freikorps.
- Max Erwin von Scheubner-Richter, Nazi leader, born 21 January 1884 in Riga. Member of the Nazi Party. Previous participant in the Kapp Putsch.
- Lorenz Ritter von Stransky-Stranka und Greiffenfels, engineer and World War I veteran, born 14 March 1889 in Müln. Member of the Freikorps, Nazi Party, and Sturmabteilung.
- Wilhelm Wolf, businessman and World War I veteran, born 19 October 1898 in Munich. Member of the Freikorps and Nazi Party.

Scheubner-Richter was walking arm-in-arm with Hitler during the putsch; he was shot in the lungs and died instantly. He brought Hitler down and dislocated Hitler's shoulder when he fell. He was the only significant Nazi leader to die during the putsch. Of all the party members who died in the putsch, Hitler claimed Scheubner-Richter to be the only "irreplaceable loss".

According to Ernst Röhm, Martin Faust and Theodor Casella, both members of the armed militia organisation Reichskriegsflagge, were shot down accidentally in a burst of machine gun fire during the occupation of the War Ministry as a result of a misunderstanding with II/Infantry Regiment 19.

Also honoured as a martyr in Mein Kampf was Karl Kuhn (born 26 July 1897), a head waiter from Heilbronn. Allegedly, he took part in the putsch as a member of the Freikorps Oberland and was fatally shot by the police. In reality, Kuhn was an innocent bystander. He was working as a waiter in a nearby restaurant when he stepped outside to watch, after which he was killed in the crossfire.

== Legacy ==
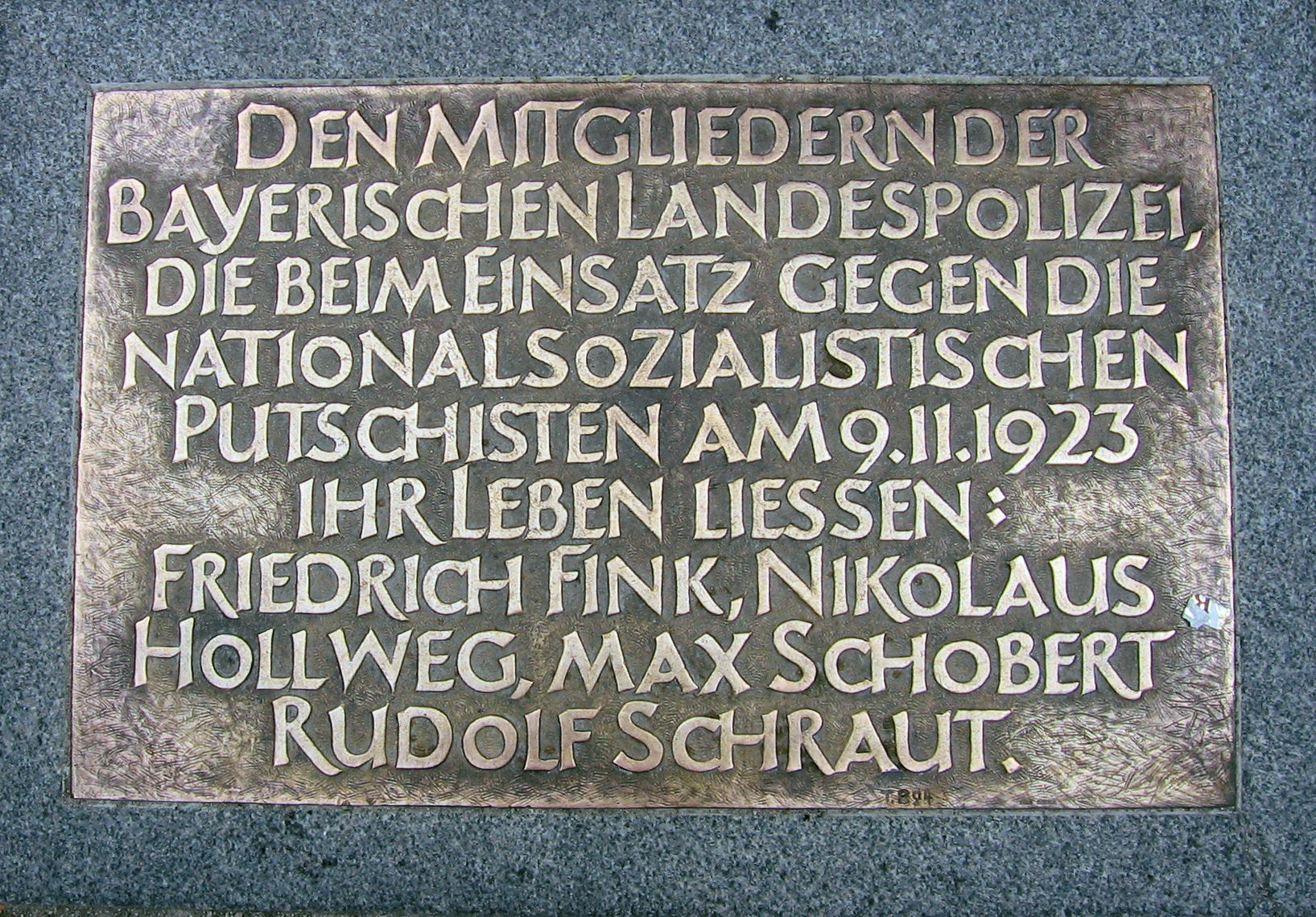
Plaque commemorating the policemen who died in the Putsch

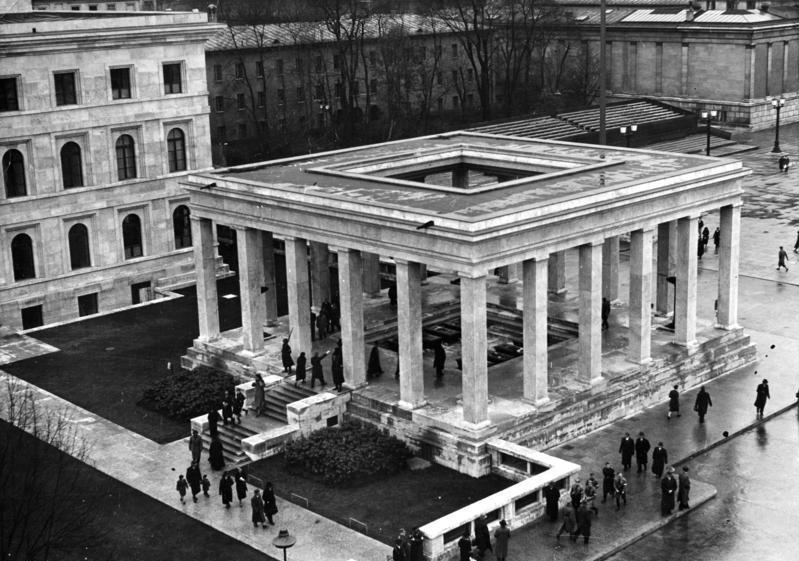
One of the Munich Ehrentempels (Honour Temples), 1936

The 15 fallen insurgents, as well as the bystander Karl Kuhn, were regarded as the first "blood martyrs" of the Nazi Party and were remembered by Hitler in the foreword of Mein Kampf. The Nazi flag they carried, which in the course of events had been stained with blood, came to be known as the Blutfahne ("blood flag") and was brought out for the swearing-in of new recruits in front of the Feldherrnhalle when Hitler was in power.

Shortly after he came to power, a memorial was placed at the south side of the Feldherrnhalle crowned with a swastika. The back of the memorial read Und ihr habt doch gesiegt! ("And you triumphed nevertheless!"). Behind it, flowers were laid, and either policemen or the SS stood guard between a lower plaque. Passers-by were required to give the Nazi salute. The putsch was also commemorated on three sets of stamps. Mein Kampf was dedicated to the fallen and, in the book Ich Kämpfe (given to those joining the party c. 1943), they are listed first even though the book lists hundreds of other dead. The header text in the book read "Though they are dead for their acts, they will live on forever." The army had a division named the Feldherrnhalle Regiment, and there was also an SA Feldherrnhalle Division.

Der neunte Elfte (9 November, literally "the ninth of the eleventh") became one of the most important dates on the Nazi calendar, especially following the seizure of power in 1933. Annually, until the fall of Nazi Germany, the putsch would be commemorated nationwide, with the major events taking place in Munich. On the night of 8 November, Hitler would address the Alte Kämpfer ("Old Fighters") in the Bürgerbräukeller (after 1939, the Löwenbräu, in 1944 in the Circus Krone Building), followed the next day by a re-enactment of the march through the streets of Munich. The event would climax with a ceremony recalling the 16 killed on the Königsplatz.

The anniversary could be a time of tension in Nazi Germany. The ceremony was cancelled in 1934, coming as it did after the so-called Night of the Long Knives. In 1938, it coincided with the Kristallnacht, and in 1939 with the attempted assassination of Hitler by Johann Georg Elser. With the outbreak of war in 1939, security concerns caused the re-enactment of the march to be suspended, never to be resumed. However, Hitler continued to deliver his 8 November speech through 1943. In 1944, Hitler skipped the event and Heinrich Himmler spoke in his place. As the war went on, residents of Munich came increasingly to dread the approach of the anniversary, concerned that the presence of the top Nazi leaders in their city would act as a magnet for Allied bombers.

Every Gau (administrative region of Germany) was also expected to hold a small remembrance ceremony. As material given to propagandists said, the 16 fallen were the first losses and the ceremony was an occasion to commemorate everyone who had died for the movement.

On 9 November 1935, the dead were taken from their graves and to the Feldherrnhalle. The SA and SS carried them down to the Königsplatz, where two Ehrentempel ("honour temples") had been constructed. In each of the structures, eight of the dead Nazis were interred in a sarcophagus bearing their name.

In June 1945, the Allied Commission removed the bodies from the Ehrentempels and contacted their families. They were given the option of having their loved ones buried in Munich cemeteries in unmarked graves or having them cremated, a common practice in Germany for unclaimed bodies. On 9 January 1947, the upper parts of the structures were blown up.

Since 1994, a commemorative plaque embedded in the pavement in front of the Feldherrnhalle contains the names of the four Bavarian policemen who died in the fight against the Nazis. The plaque reads:

Den Mitgliedern der Bayerischen Landespolizei, die beim Einsatz gegen die Nationalsozialistischen Putschisten am 9.11.1923 Ihr Leben ließen. ("To the members of the Bavarian Police, who gave their lives opposing the National Socialist coup on 9 November 1923: [...]")

In 2010, Munich Mayor Christian Ude and Bavarian Interior Minister Joachim Herrmann unveiled a memorial plaque at the Munich Residence, after which the base plate was removed in 2011 and handed over to the city museum.

== Supporters of the Putsch ==
=== Key supporters ===
- Adolf Hitler
- Rudolf Hess
- Hermann Göring
- Alfred Rosenberg
- Erich Ludendorff
- Ernst Röhm
- Julius Streicher
- Hermann Kriebel
- Friedrich Weber
- Max Erwin von Scheubner-Richter
- Ulrich Graf
- Hermann Esser
- Ernst Hanfstaengl
- Gottfried Feder
- Joseph Berchtold
- Ernst Pöhner
- Emil Maurice
- Max Amann
- Heinz Pernet
- Wilhelm Brückner
- Robert Heinrich Wagner

=== Other notable supporters ===
- Eleonore Baur, the only known woman participant
- Karl Beggel
- Heinrich Bennecke
- Franz Bock
- Hermann Boehm
- Martin Bormann†
- Philipp Bouhler
- Rudolf Buttmann
- Adolf Ritter von Denk
- Capt. Eduard Dietl
- Josef "Sepp" Dietrich
- Dietrich Eckart
- Hans Frank
- Wilhelm Frick
- Johann Baptist Fuchs
- Josef Gerum
- Albrecht von Graefe
- Jakob Grimminger
- Helene Hanfstaengl††
- Friedrich Haselmayr
- Edmund Heines
- Wilhelm Helfer
- Walther Hewel
- Heinrich Himmler
- Heinrich Hoffmann
- Hans Georg Hofmann
- Matthäus Hofmann
- Rudolf Höss†
- Adolf Hühnlein
- Rudolf Jung
- Hans Kallenbach
- Emil Ketterer
- Hans Ulrich Klintzsch
- Helmut Klotz
- Otto von Kursell
- Gustav Adolf Lenk
- Wilhelm Friedrich Loeper
- Max Neunzert
- Theodor Oberländer
- Franz Pfeffer von Salomon
- Michael Ried
- Gerhard Roßbach
- Julius Schaub
- Arno Schickedanz
- Wilhelm Schmid
- Julius Schreck
- Ernst Rüdiger Starhemberg
- Gregor Strasser
- Heinrich Trambauer
- Karl Fischer von Treuenfeld
- Adolf Wagner

† Bormann and Höss were awaiting trial after their assassination of Walther Kadow on behalf of the movement, supposedly avenging his alleged betrayal of Leo Schlageter, a resistance fighter much admired by members of the paramilitary right during the occupation of the Ruhr who had been executed by French authorities in May 1923. Evidence connecting Kadow to Schlageter's discovery, arrest and execution was later found to be utterly lacking. Thus — while these two were not actually present in the ranks of the stormtroopers on the night of the Putsch — their actions, eventual promotions and the various rewards or preference* shown to them within the hierarchy of the Third Reich on the strength of having served time in prison for actions undertaken on behalf of the party underline their significance as exemplars of Nazism, and particularly of "the Old Fighters" who had already pledged allegiance to Hitler by the time of the first strike against the Republic.

†† Though Helene Hanfstaengl was not in the streets during the main action of the Putsch, it was to the Hanfstaengl's residence that Hitler fled after the collapse of the rebellion and it was she who prevented him from committing suicide when the police arrived to arrest him.

=== At the front of the march ===
In the vanguard were four flag bearers followed by Adolf Lenk and Kurt Neubauer, Ludendorff's servant. Behind those two came more flag bearers, then the leadership in two rows.

Hitler was in the centre, slouch hat in hand, the collar of his trenchcoat turned up against the cold. To his left, in civilian clothes, a green felt hat, and a loose loden coat, was Ludendorff. To Hitler's right was Scheubner-Richter. To his right came Alfred Rosenberg. On either side of these men were Ulrich Graf, Hermann Kriebel, Friedrich Weber, Julius Streicher, Hermann Göring, and Wilhelm Brückner.

Behind these came the second string of Heinz Pernet, Johann Aigner (Scheubner-Richter's servant), Gottfried Feder, Theodor von der Pfordten, Wilhelm Kolb, Rolf Reiner, Hans Streck, and Heinrich Bennecke, Brückner's adjutant.

Behind this row marched the Stoßtrupp-Hitler, the SA, the Infantry School, and the Oberländer.

=== Defendants in the "Ludendorff–Hitler" trial ===
- Wilhelm Brückner
- Wilhelm Frick
- Adolf Hitler
- Hermann Kriebel
- Erich Ludendorff
- Heinz Pernet
- Ernst Pöhner
- Ernst Röhm
- Robert Heinrich Wagner
- Friedrich Weber

== See also ==
- 2022 German coup d'état plot
- Bavarian Soviet Republic
- Blood Order – A commemorative award given to participants
- Blutfahne
- German October
- German revolution of 1918–1919
- Hamburg Uprising
- Kapp Putsch
- March Action
- Early Nazism timeline
- Spartacist uprising
- Timeline of the Weimar Republic
- People given posthumous fame by the Nazis:
  - Wilhelm Gustloff
  - Horst Wessel
  - Herbert Norkus

== Bibliography ==
- Bear, Ileen (2016). Adolf Hitler: A Biography. Vij Books India Pvt Ltd. ISBN 978-93-86019-47-9.
- Dornberg, John (1982), Munich 1923: The Story of Hitler's First Grab for Power, New York: Harper & Row.
- Evans, Richard J. (2003). The Coming of the Third Reich. New York: Penguin Books. ISBN 0-14-303469-3.
- Gordon, Harold J. Jr. (1972), Hitler and the Beer Hall Putsch, Princeton, New Jersey: Princeton University Press.
- Gordon, Harold J. Jr. (1976), The Hitler Trial Before the People's Court in Munich, University Publications of America.
- Kershaw, Ian (1999) [1998]. Hitler: 1889–1936: Hubris. New York: W. W. Norton & Company. ISBN 978-0-393-04671-7.
- Kershaw, Ian (2008). Hitler: A Biography. New York: W. W. Norton & Company. ISBN 978-0-393-06757-6.
- King, David (2017). The Trial of Adolf Hitler: The Beer Hall Putsch and the Rise of Nazi Germany. W. W. Norton & Company. ISBN 9781447251118.
- Large, David Clay (1997), Where Ghosts Walked, Munich's Road to the Third Reich, New York: W. W. Norton & Company.
- Shirer, William L. (1960). The Rise and Fall of the Third Reich. New York: Simon & Schuster. OCLC 824193307.
- Snyder, Louis Leo (1961), Hitler and Nazism, New York: Franklin Watts.
- The full text of The Adolf Hitler Trial before the People's Court in Munich Judgment at Wikisource
