= Jakob Grimminger =

German Nazi Party, SA and SS member

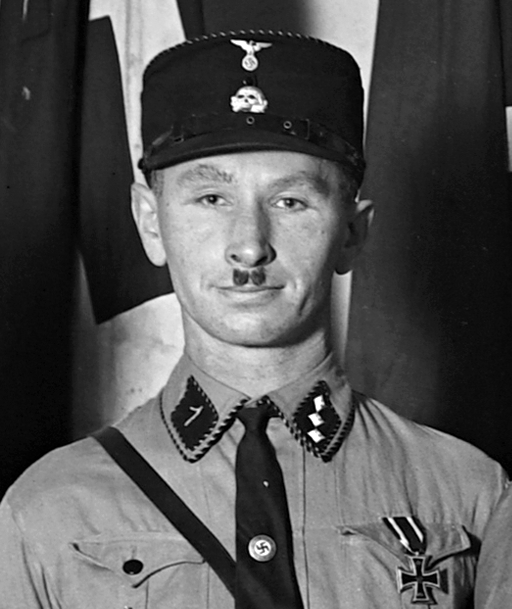
- Grimminger as a SS-Sturmführer in the early 1930s.
- Born: 25 April 1892; Augsburg, Kingdom of Bavaria, German Empire
- Died: 28 January 1969 (aged 76); Munich, Bavaria, West Germany
- Military career
- Allegiance: German Empire; Nazi Germany
- Branch: Imperial German Army (1908–1919); Schutzstaffel (1926–1945)
- Rank: SS-Standartenführer
- Conflicts: World War I Gallipoli Campaign; World War II Home front

Jakob Grimminger (25 April 1892 – 28 January 1969) was a German Nazi Party and Schutzstaffel (SS) member. As the official standard-bearer of the Blutfahne, an iconic flag of the Nazi movement that had become bloodstained during the Munich Putsch in 1923, Grimminger often appeared close to Hitler in photographs and during ceremonies.

== Early life ==
Grimminger was born in Augsburg, Kingdom of Bavaria and entered the Imperial German Army when he was sixteen years old. He served during World War I as a mechanic in an air regiment from 1914 and 1917. He fought in the Gallipoli Campaign. Furthermore, he also served a year in Palestine, after which he returned to Germany. Having been awarded the Iron Cross (second class), Bavarian medals and the Turkish Iron Crescent, Grimminger was discharged from the German Army in 1919.

== Nazi Party activity ==
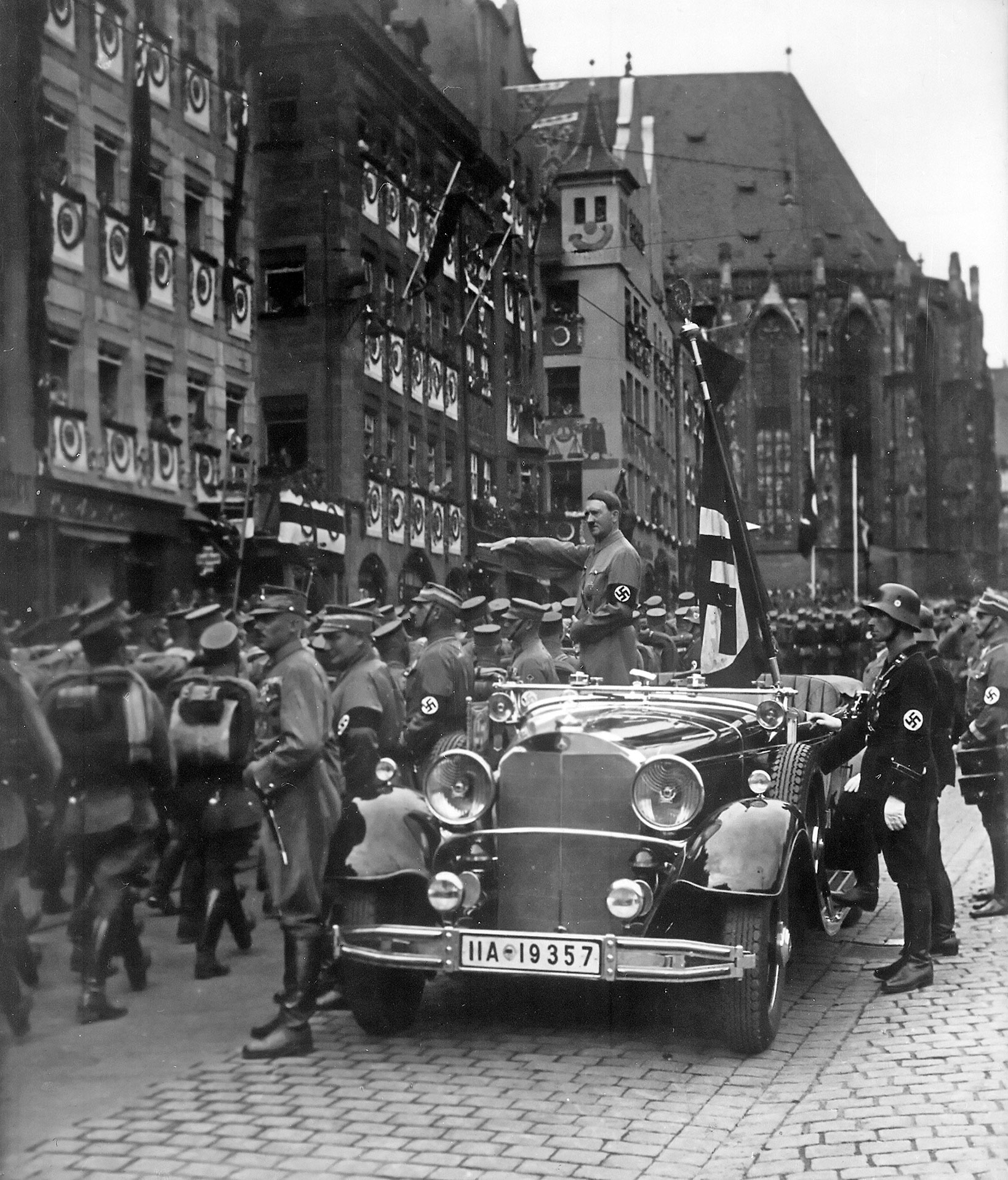
Adolf Hitler at the SA parade in Nuremberg, September 1935. Franz Pfeffer von Salomon and Hermann Göring stand to the left; SS-Sturmbannführer Jakob Grimminger stands behind the car.

Grimminger joined the Nazi Party (NSDAP) in 1922 and became a member of the Sturmabteilung (SA). He took part in street-fighting in Coburg in 1922 and in the Munich Beer Hall Putsch of 8 November 1923. After serving in the Brown House, the general headquarters of the NSDAP, he was selected in 1926 to become a member of the Schutzstaffel (SS). Grimminger was promoted during his service in the SA and the SS, finally reaching the rank of SS-Standartenführer (equivalent to colonel). As a member of the SS, he was appointed to carry the bloodstained Blutfahne from the Beer Hall Putsch. He was decorated with the Golden Party Badge, the Blood Order (no. 714), and the Coburg Badge, three of the most prized decorations of the NSDAP. After the fall of the Nazi Germany in mid-1945, the fate of the "Blutfahne", of which Grimminger was the guardian, is unknown.

== Post World War II ==
Grimminger survived World War II, and was put on trial by the Allies in 1946 for being a member of the SS and ceremonially carrying the Blutfahne for nineteen years as a part of the propaganda of the Nazi Party. For this, he was not sent to prison, but all of his property was confiscated. He died in obscurity in Munich on 28 January 1969 at the age of 76. His body was buried in Munich's Waldfriedhof, but the grave was subsequently reclaimed, and his body was relocated to an unmarked grave in Herzebrock-Clarholz.

== Honours ==
- Coburg Badge
- Golden Party Badge
- Honour Chevron for the Old Guard
- SS Honour Ring (Deathshead ring)
- Blood Order
- Iron Cross 2nd Class 1914,
- The Honour Cross of the World War 1914/1918

=== Ottoman medals ===
- Gallipoli Star

== Notes and references ==
Notes

References

- "Internet Movie Database entry on Jakob Grimminger". IMDb.
