= Ernst Pöhner =

German politician

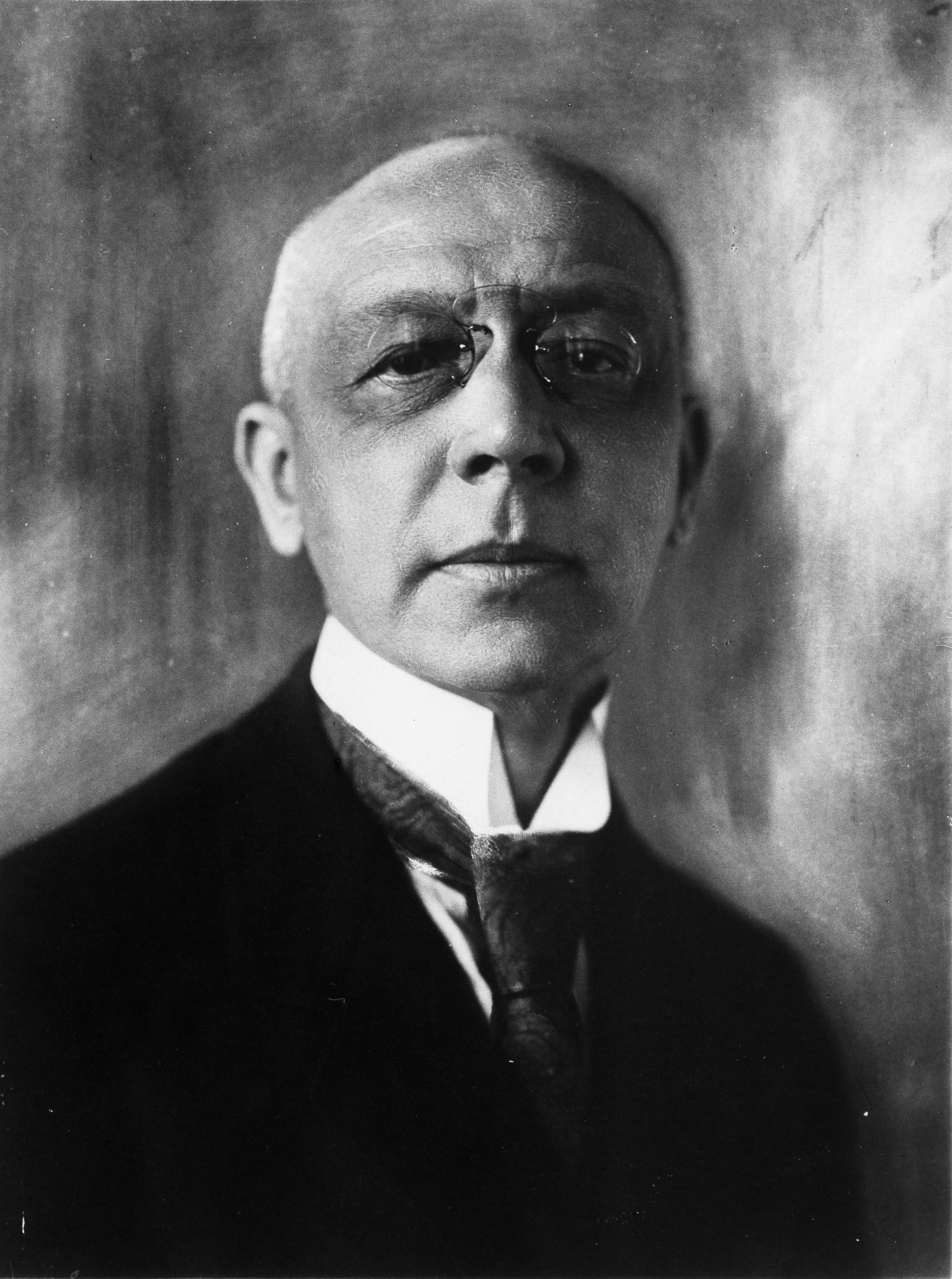
- Born: 11 January 1870; Hof, Kingdom of Bavaria
- Died: 11 April 1925 (aged 55); Feldkirchen, Upper Bavaria, Weimar Republic
- Political party: Nazi Party; German National People's Party

Ernst Pöhner (11 January 1870 – 11 April 1925) was Munich's Chief of Police ('Green' Police President) from 1919 to 1922. He was a vigorous anti-communist and antisemite who was in office when Bavarian Minister President Gustav Ritter von Kahr had Ostjuden, or "Eastern Jews", expelled from Bavaria. As part of an antisemitic campaign throughout Germany in 1920, Kahr ordered the mass expulsion from Bavaria of the so-called Eastern Jews, many of whom had lived there for generations.

Pöhner was also instrumental in mounting terror and in supporting Organisation Consul death squads, which carried out politically motivated murders with the intent of destabilizing the country and installing a right-wing dictatorship. Confronted with the charge that entire groups of right-wing political assassins were at large and working in and around Munich, he reportedly said: "Yes ... but too few of them."

Pöhner was closely linked to Gustav von Kahr, who had his own plans for overthrowing the government of the Weimar Republic but who opposed the 1923 Hitler Beer Hall Putsch. Pöhner was a central figure in the putsch and was to be named Bavaria's minister president if the coup succeeded. He was subsequently convicted with Hitler in 1924 of high treason and sentenced to five years in prison. While in prison, Pöhner switched to the German National People's Party. He was released from prison on 31 March 1925.

Pöhner died in a car accident the following month.

During the Nazi era, a street was named after Pöhner. The name was changed back in 1946.

== Mention in Mein Kampf ==
He is awarded in Hitler's Mein Kampf for not eliminating "this process of recovery and to make it impossable" he later says "Ernst Pohner was the only man in a responsible post who did not curry favor with the masses, but felt responsible to his nationality...".
