= Blutfahne =

Lost Nazi Party flag relic

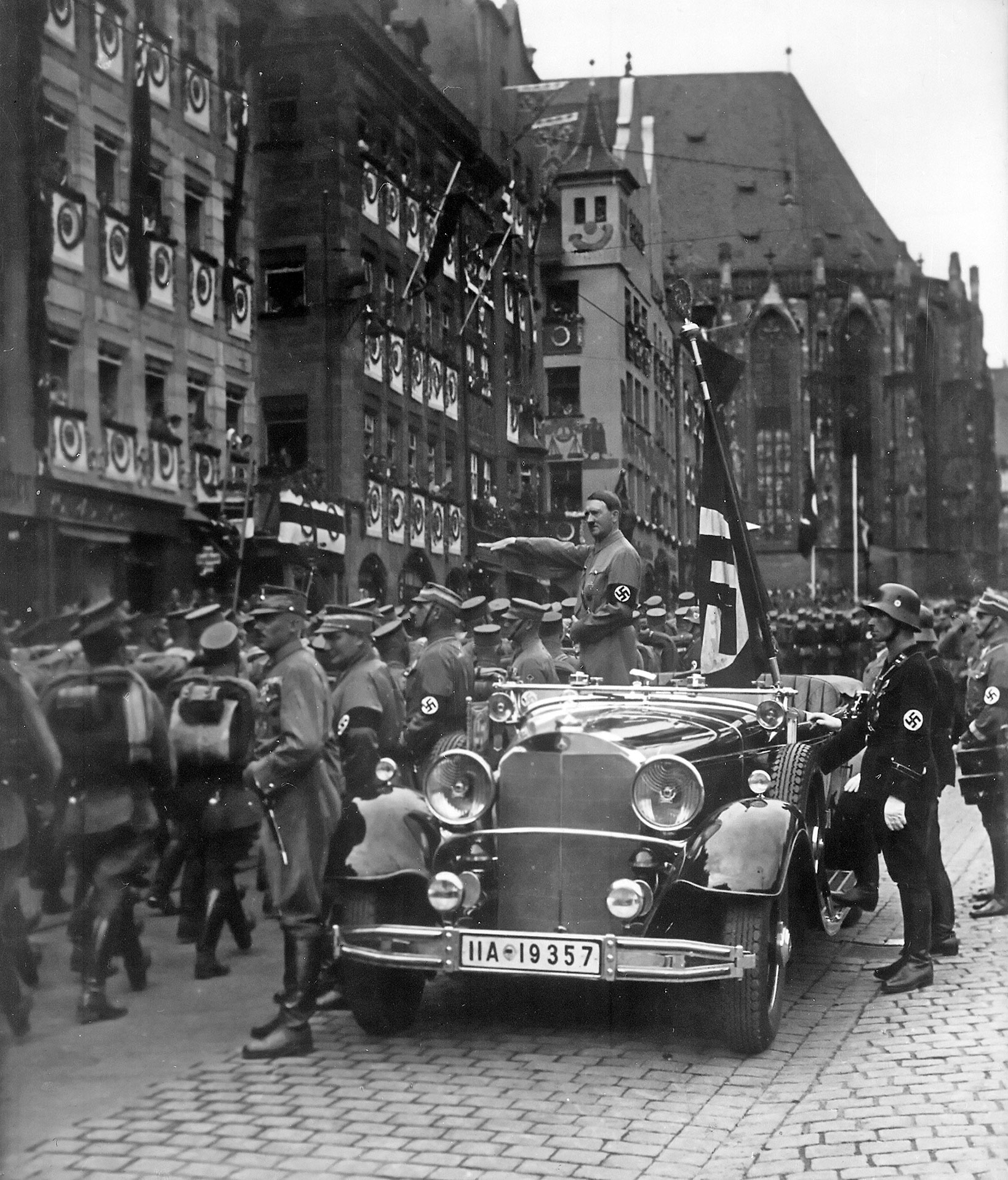
Adolf Hitler reviewing SA members in 1935. He is accompanied by the Blutfahne and its bearer SS-Sturmbannführer Jakob Grimminger.

The Blutfahne (pronounced [ˈbluːtfaːnə]), or Blood Flag, is or was a Nazi Party swastika flag that was carried during the attempted coup d'état Beer Hall Putsch in Munich, Germany on 9 November 1923, during which it became soaked in the blood of one of the SA men who died. It subsequently became one of the most revered objects of the Nazi Party. It was used in ceremonies in which new flags for party organisations were "consecrated" by the Blood Flag when touched by it.

== Beer Hall Putsch ==
The flag was that of the 5th SA Sturm, which was carried in the march towards the Feldherrnhalle. When the Munich police fired on the National Socialists (Nazis), the flagbearer Heinrich Trambauer was hit and dropped the flag. Andreas Bauriedl, an SA man marching alongside the flag, was killed and fell onto it, staining the flag with his blood.

There were two stories about what happened to the flag in the aftermath of the Putsch: one was that the wounded Trambauer took the flag to a friend where he removed it from its staff before leaving with it hidden inside his jacket and later giving it to a man named Karl Eggers for safekeeping. The other story was that the flag was confiscated by the Munich authorities and was later returned to the Nazis via Eggers. In the mid-1930s, after a myth emerged that Bauriedl had been carrying the flag, an investigation by Nazi archivists concluded that Trambauer was the standard-bearer and that the flag had been concealed by an SA man, not taken by the police, though they had confiscated other flags which they later returned. Regardless of which story was the correct one, after Adolf Hitler was released from Landsberg Prison (having served nine months of a five-year prison sentence for his part in the putsch), Eggers gave the flag to him.

== Sacred Nazi symbol ==
After Hitler received the flag, he had it fitted to a new staff and finial; just below the finial was a silver dedication sleeve which bore the names of the 16 dead participants of the putsch. Bauriedl was one of the 16 honorees. In addition, the flag was no longer attached to the staff by its original sewn-in sleeve, but by a red-white-black intertwined cord which ran through the sleeve instead. In 1926, at the second Nazi Party congress at Weimar, Hitler ceremonially bestowed the flag on Joseph Berchtold, then head of the SS. The flag was thereafter treated as a sacred object by the Nazi Party and carried by SS–Sturmbannführer Jakob Grimminger at various Nazi Party ceremonies. One of the most visible uses of the flag was when Hitler, at the Party's annual Nuremberg rallies, touched other Nazi banners with the Blutfahne, thereby "sanctifying" them. This was done in a special ceremony called the "flag consecration" (Fahnenweihe).

When not in use, the Blutfahne was kept at the headquarters of the Nazi Party, the Brown House in Munich with an SS guard of honour. The flag had a small tear in it, believed to have been caused during the Putsch, that went unrepaired for a number of years.

== Disappearance ==
The Blutfahne was last seen in public at the Volkssturm induction ceremony on 18 October 1944 (not, as frequently reported, at Gauleiter Adolf Wagner's funeral six months previously). This ceremony was conducted by Heinrich Himmler and attended by Wilhelm Keitel, Heinz Guderian, Hans Lammers, Martin Bormann, Karl Fiehler, Wilhelm Schepmann, and Erwin Kraus.

After this last public display, the Blutfahne vanished. Its current whereabouts are unknown, but it is generally assumed to have been destroyed amidst the Allied bombing of Munich in 1945.

== See also ==
- Glossary of Nazi Germany
- List of German flags
- Nazism
- Personal standard of Adolf Hitler
