= Krzysztof Lenk =

Polish graphic designer (1936–2018)

Krszysztof Lenk
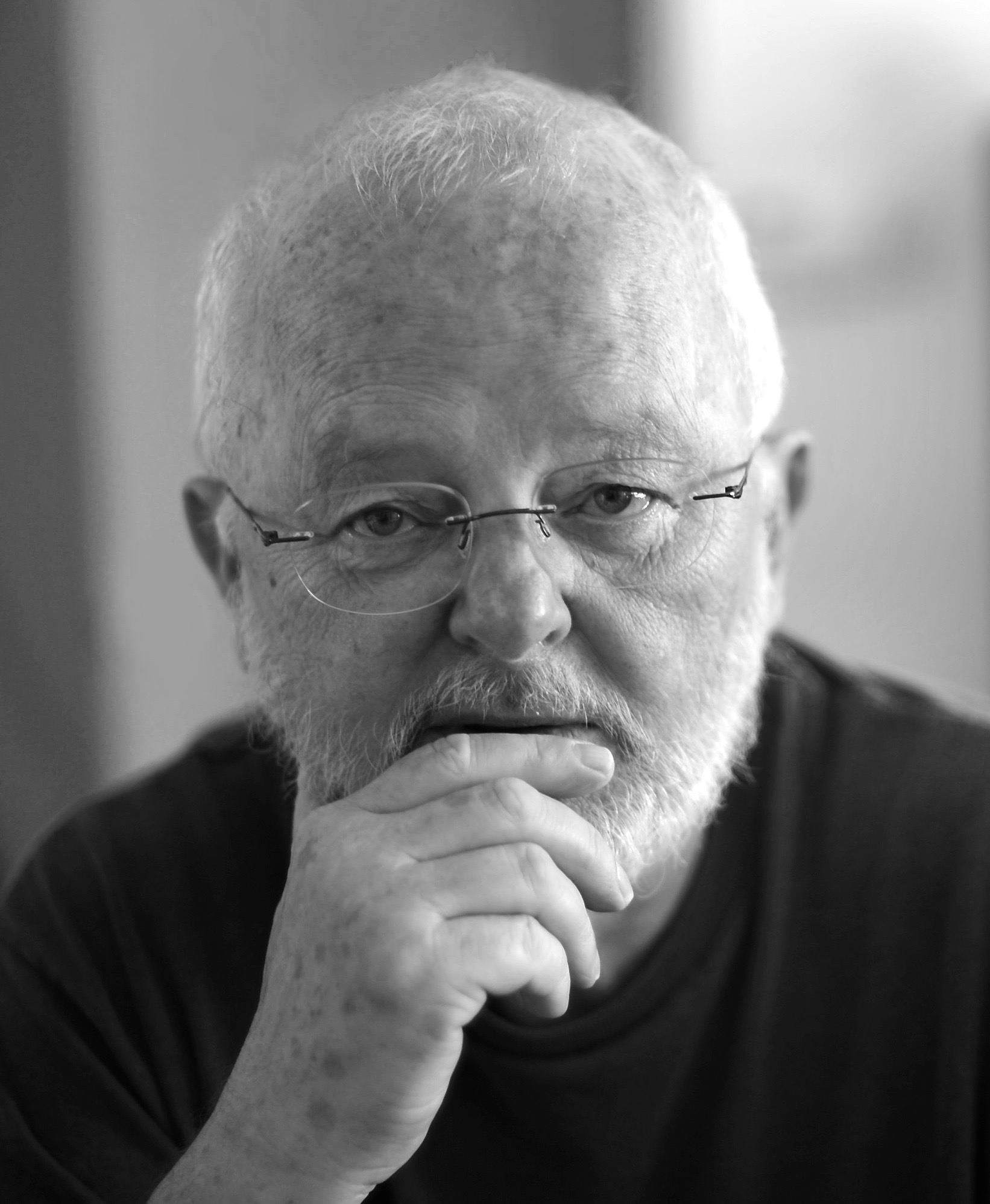
- Lenk, 2008
- Born: July 21, 1936; Warsaw, Poland
- Died: May 22, 2018 (aged 81)
- Education: Warsaw Academy of Fine Art
- Occupations: Graphic designer, educator

Krzysztof Lenk (also known as Kris; July 21, 1936 – May 22, 2018) was a Polish graphic designer known as a specialist of visual communication, and a celebrated educator. During his career, he designed numerous magazines and publications, posters and book covers, diagrams and information maps; he was a professor of graphic design at Academy of Fine Arts in Łódź, Poland, and later at Rhode Island School of Design (RISD) in the US; co-founder (with Paul Kahn) of Dynamic Diagrams, a firm specializing in information design, where he served as creative director between 1990 and 2001. Krzysztof Lenk shared his expertise through numerous lectures, workshops and conferences in many countries. He was an author and co-author of many books and articles. For his achievements he received an Honorary Doctorate Degree at the Academy of Fine Arts in Katowice, Poland, his alma mater.

== Early years and education ==
Krzysztof Lenk was born in 1936 in Warsaw, Poland. His early memories include time witnessing World War II. After the war he lived in Warsaw with his parents and later his wife and children throughout the first half of his life. He studied at the Warsaw Academy of Fine Art and then at the Department of Graphic Design of the Academy of Fine Arts in Katowice, where he graduated in 1961. After earning his degree, Lenk worked as a freelance artist designing books, book covers and posters. He travelled to Paris, where he worked for the Société Nouvelle d'Information et Publicité (SNIP) advertising agency (which later became TBWA) and for the magazine Jeune Afrique. These experiences led him to discover his interest for design of information and narration, and steered his work toward magazines.

Back in Warsaw, in 1969 he designed a weekly magazine, Perspektywy, and maintained position as its art director until 1972. Between 1970 and 1981, he also art directed other magazines, such as Polish Art Review, Problemy, Ilustrowany Magazyn Turystyczny, Przeglad Techniczny, and Animafilm. During this time he also designed numerous books, albums and professional publications.

In 1970-71 he co-designed a large promotional campaign for the German company ERCO Leuchten, which produced lighting fixtures made by leading designers of Europe.

In 1973, Lenk started his career as an educator in Academy of Fine Arts in Łódź, where he taught typography and design of periodicals in the Graphic Design department until 1982. During the academic year of 1979/80, he travelled on invitation to teach at Ohio State University in Columbus, OH. Over the course of those years he received an award from the Polish Ministry of Art and Culture for his educational excellence.

== Later years ==
In 1982, living under Martial Law in Poland, Krzysztof Lenk was invited to Rhode Island School of Design (RISD) as a visiting professor. While there, a permanent position opened up in the Graphic Design department, which led to his tenure at RISD for nearly thirty years until he retired in 2010. Professor Lenk taught information design and typography to undergraduates and graduate students, and traveled widely abroad as a visiting scholar. He brought workshops and lectures to many schools and institutions throughout the US and around the world, including Canada, Netherlands, Scandinavia, England, India, Australia, and New Zealand.

Krzysztof Lenk's renown expertise in logic of visual communication coincided with the launch of the World Wide Web and the internet revolution. Together with Paul Kahn he founded the information architecture firm, Dynamic Diagrams. The studio rapidly grew to a company with offices in Providence, Baltimore, and London, England. Between 1990 and 2001 Krzysztof led the company as its Creative Director. After retiring from the company, he remained active there as an advisor and consultant.

Dynamic Diagrams worked with many global institutions, including IBM, Sun Microsystems, Microsoft, Harvard University, Yale University, Holocaust Museum in Washington, Asian Art Museum in San Francisco, Merrill Lynch, MacMillan in London, Musee des Arts et Metier in Paris, and Samsung Electronics in Korea. The Samsung commission was one of their largest – Dynamic Diagrams coordinated the design of 75 websites, across 35 countries and 18 languages.

Since 2000, Krzysztof Lenk had also served as an advisor to Tellart, a Providence-based experience design firm founded by RISD alumni.

Lenk contributed as a lecturer to various conferences and professional events around the world, including the International Design Conference in Aspen, where he was invited in 1983 as an IBM Fellow. In 2001, he gave a talk at the TED Conference, where he presented a dynamic statistical model of the world as represented by a village of 1000 inhabitants. Lenk was also an active member of American Institute of Graphic Arts (AIGA).

Lenk devoted his final years to writing his memoirs. In 2018, he died of cancer at age 81 in Barrington, Rhode Island. He is survived by his wife, Ewa Zembrzuska Lenk (married in 1963) and their two children, Honorata and Jack.

== Awards ==
- 1977 - Excellence in Teaching Design award from the Ministry of Culture and Art in Poland
- 1983 - IBM Fellow at the International Design Conference in Aspen, Colorado
- 2011 - A 'Silver Cane' recognition for excellence in teaching awarded by the Association of the Friends of Academy of Fine Art in Warsaw, Poland
- 2011 - Honorary Doctorate Degree from The Academy of Fine Art in Katowice, Poland

== Publications ==
Krzysztof Lenk, Paul Kahn (1997). "Krysztof Lenk and Paul Kahn: Dynamic Diagrams". In Richard Saul Wurman. Information Architects. New York: Graphis. pp. 190–201. ISBN 9781888001389

Paul Kahn, Krzysztof Lenk (2001). Mapping Web Sites. RotoVision SA. ISBN 2880464641

Krszysztof Lenk (2009). Projects and Doodles / Projekty i bazgroly. Gdańsk, Poland: słowo/obraz teorytoria. ISBN 978-83-7453-914-2

Krzysztof Lenk (2011). Krotkie teksty o sztuce projektowania. Gdańsk, Poland: słowo/obraz teorytoria. ISBN 9788374539982

Krzysztof Lenk (2010). Pokazać. Wyjaśnić. Prowadzić. / To show. To explain. To guide. Cieszyn, Poland: Śląski Zamek Sztuki i Przedsiębiorczości. ISBN 9788392954194

Krzysztof Lenk (2011). Typografia – Wystawa prac studentów programu typografii, Wykład "Słowa i teksty", Warsztat z typografii. Uniwersytet Artystyczny w Poznaniu. ISBN 9788388400780

Krzysztof Lenk (2011). "Czarne na białyn, w ruchu…". In Przemek Dębowski and Jacek Mrowczyk. Widzieć/Wiedzieć, Wybór najważniejszych tekstów o dizajnie. Kraków, Poland: Karakter. pp. 429–435. ISBN 978-83-62376-90-2

Krzysztof Lenk, Ewa Satelecka (2018). Podaj dalej: Dizajn, nauczanie, życie. Krzysztof Lenk w rozmowie z Ewą Satelecką. Kraków, Poland: Karakter. ISBN 9788365271709
