= Nußdorf (Chiemgau) =

- Municipality
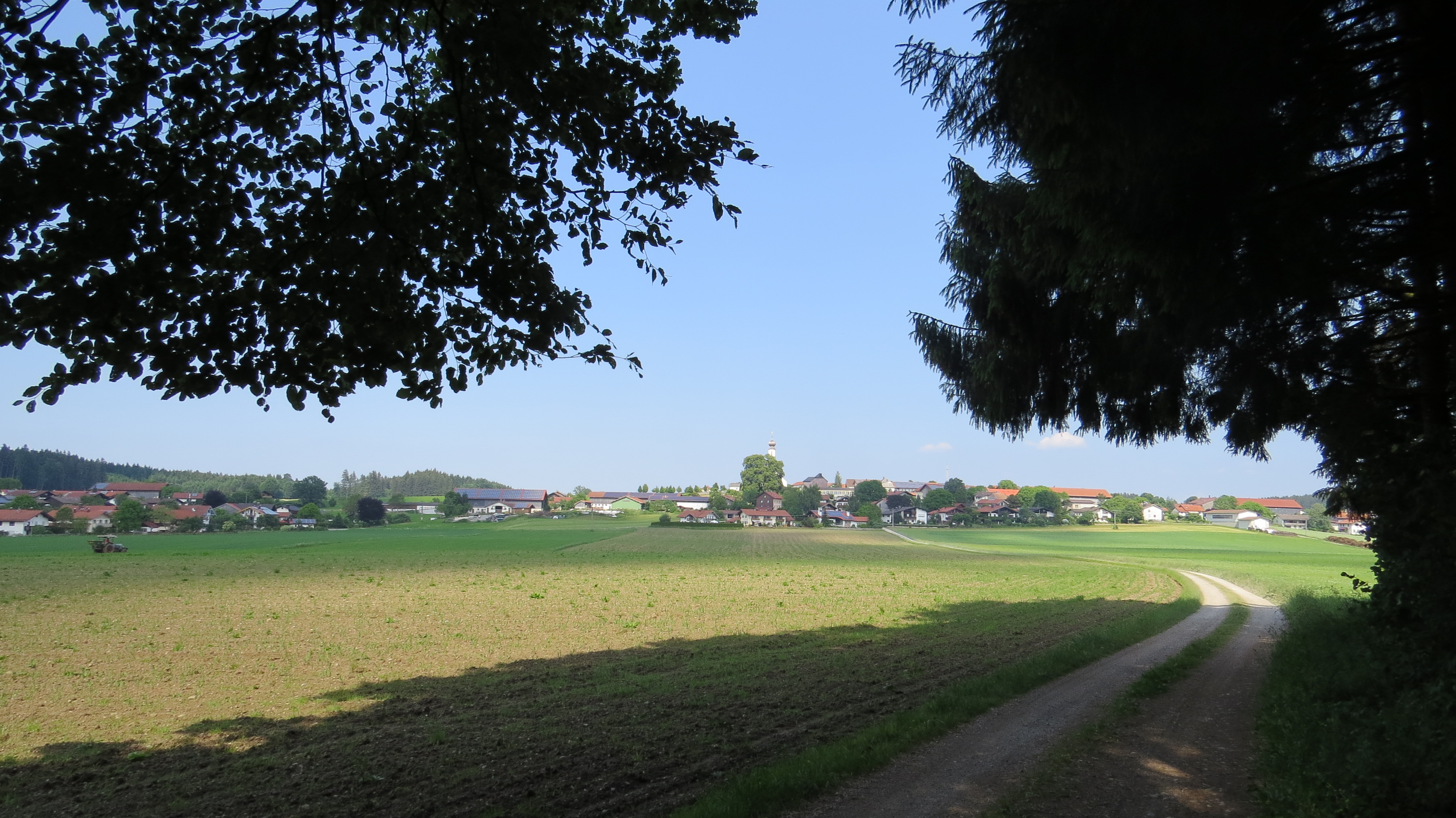
- Nußdorf seen from the west

- Coat of arms

- Location of Nußdorf within Traunstein district
- Interactive map of Nußdorf
- Location within Germany Location within Bavaria
- Coordinates: 47°53′N 12°35′E
- Country: Germany
- State: Bavaria
- Admin. region: Oberbayern
- District: Traunstein
- Subdivisions: 10 Ortsteile

Government
  - Mayor (2020–26): Anton Wimmer (CSU)

Area
  - Total: 16.12 km^{2} (6.22 sq mi)
- Elevation: 603 m (1,978 ft)

Population (2025-12-31)
  - Total: 2,346
  - Density: 145.5/km^{2} (376.9/sq mi)
- Time zone: UTC+01:00 (CET)
  - Summer (DST): UTC+02:00 (CEST)
- Postal codes: 83365
- Dialling codes: 08669
- Vehicle registration: TS
- Website: www.nussdorf-chiemgau.de

Nußdorf (German pronunciation: [ˈnʊsdɔʁf]) is a municipality in the district of Traunstein in Bavaria in Germany. Its located in oberbayern
