= Gustav Adolf Lenk =

German activist

Gustav Adolf Lenk (October 15, 1903 – 1987) was a German political activist. Lenk was the founder of the Youth League of the Nazi Party, the predecessor of the Hitler Youth.

== Early life ==
Lenk was a trained piano polisher. On September 12, 1920, Lenk and his father attended a National-Socialist party meeting in Munich where Adolf Hitler gave a speech. He was captivated, but could not join the party at the time because he was younger than 18 years old. Lenk requested if he could start a youth organization that would be associated with the NSDAP, and the idea appealed to many and was allowed to be created.

When Hitler, then chairman of the party, in a speech in December 1921 casually mentioned a possible youth organization, Lenk, now member of the party, came back to his idea. In March 1922 published in the party's newspaper was on Hitler's initiative Völkischer Beobachter. The founding meeting of the Youth League on 13 May 1922 in Bürgerbräukeller, Munich, Lenk began as a youth leader together with Adolf Hitler as a speaker. Initially limited to Munich, in 1922 more local groups were still being founded in Bavaria and central Germany and published their own newspapers.

== German Youth Movement ==
After the unsuccessful Beer Hall Putsch in November 1923, the Youth League was banned in Germany just like the party, but was continued by Lenk under the name of the Patriotic Youth Association of Greater Germany. The Patriotic Youth Association of Greater Germany was then disbanded by officials because they believed that it was just a new name for the Nazi Youth League. Lenk was then imprisoned, and when he was released, he founded another group, the Greater German Youth Movement. He was then arrested again and sent to Landsberg Prison, where he was released in December 1924. Lenk was released from prison at a similar time as Hitler, and shortly after Hitler's release, Hitler re-founded the Nazi Party. Lenk was hesitant of Hitler because he had declared himself undisputed leader of the National Socialist German Workers' Party, so he founded a new nationalist youth organization which was not affiliated with Hitler. In response, the Party spread rumors saying that Lenk was a traitor and a petty thief. This led to Lenk's downfall out of German youth movements. Kurt Gruber served as Lenk's successor as the youth organization's leader. After the establishment of the Hitler Youth in 1926, the party no longer recognized Lenk's organization as a precursor.

== After the Youth Movement ==
In March 1932, Lenk met again at the party and became active in the SA. In 1941, working now in the SA national leadership in Berlin was expelled from the party because he had improperly taken the "Blood Order". A new membership application was unsuccessful.

== Death ==
The only known fact about Lenk's death is that it occurred sometime in 1987.
