= Weimar paramilitary groups =

1918–1930s armed German civilian groups

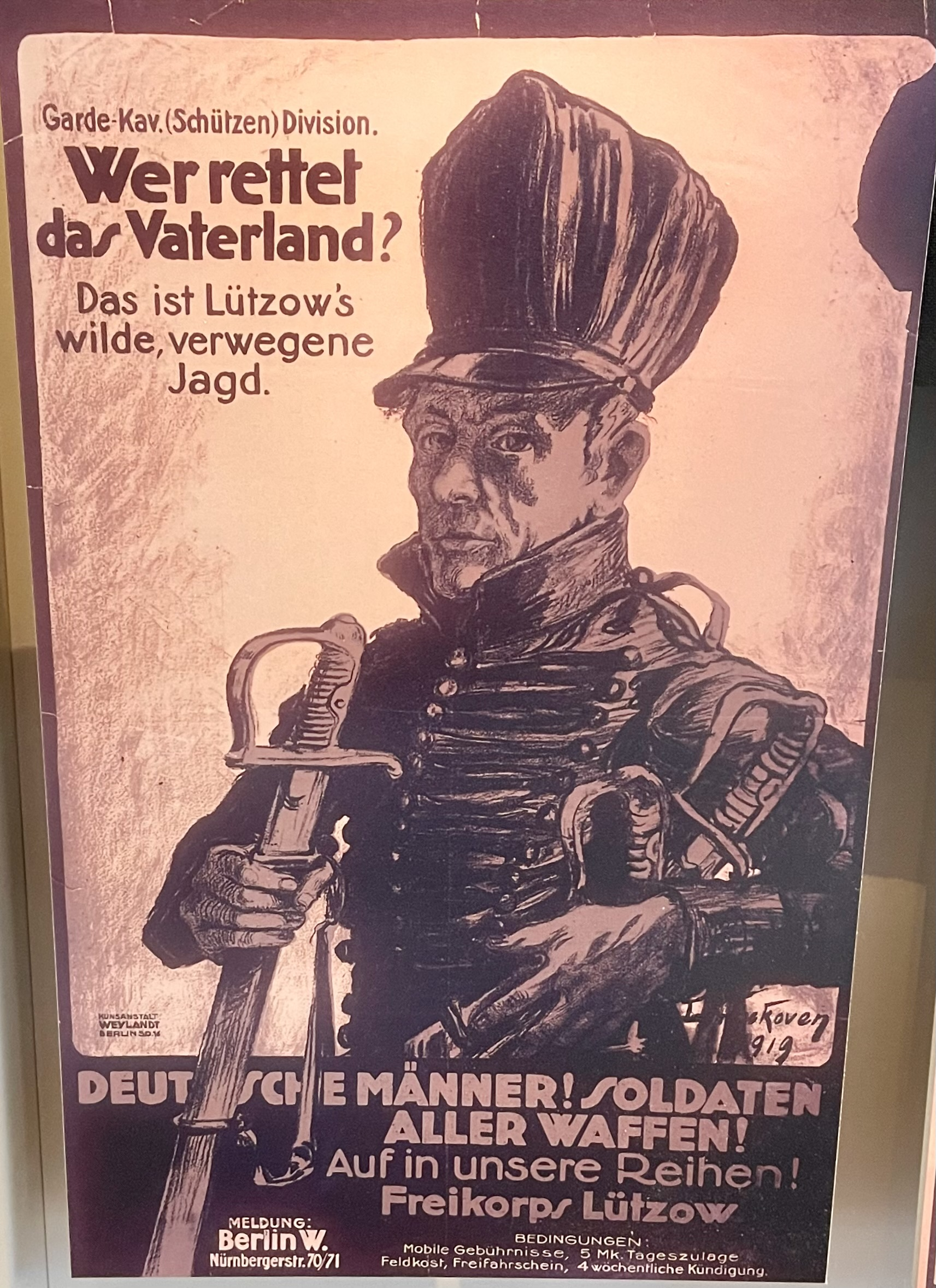
Recruiting poster for the Freikorps Lützow: "Who will save the Fatherland? That is Lützow's wild, daring pursuit. German men! Soldiers of all branches! Join our ranks!"

Weimar paramilitary groups were militarily organized units that were formed outside of the regular German Army following the defeat of the German Empire in World War I. The most prominent of them, the Freikorps, were combat units that were supported by the German government and used to suppress uprisings from primarily the Left, but also the Right. There were also Citizens' Defense (Einwohnerwehr) groups to maintain public order and paramilitary groups associated with specific political parties or institutions to protect and promote their interests.

Most who volunteered for the paramilitary groups came from the 6 million German soldiers who returned from the war to a country in the midst of the turmoil of the German revolution, which overthrew the Hohenzollern monarchy and established the Weimar Republic. The Freikorps especially took part in significant fighting in the Baltics, Silesia, and Berlin during the Spartacist uprising and in the Ruhr during the 1920 uprising there. The paramilitary groups as a whole contributed significantly to the remilitarization of Germany between the wars.

The Citizens' Defense groups were disbanded in 1920 and the Freikorps in 1921 because the government came to see them as threats and because of pressure from the Allies, who feared that the paramilitary groups were being used to circumvent the 100,000 man limit on the German Army imposed by the Treaty of Versailles. The paramilitary groups connected with political parties or movements lasted throughout the life of the Weimar Republic and in the case of the Nazi Party's Sturmabteilung (SA), beyond its end.

== Freikorps ==
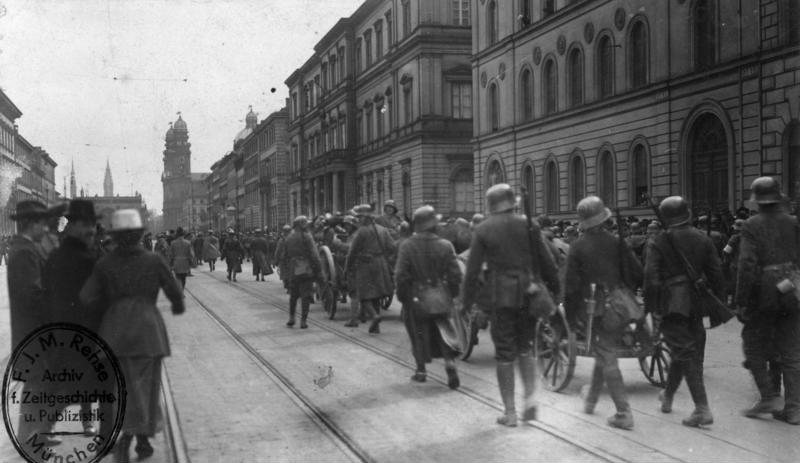
The Guards Cavalry Rifle Division (Garde-Kavallerie-Schützen-Division), a major Freikorps unit, enters Munich after crushing the Munich Soviet Republic.

In the aftermath of World War I and during the German revolution of 1918–1919, Freikorps units consisting largely of World War I veterans were raised as paramilitary militias. They were armed with the rifles they had returned with from the front; infantry and cavalry units also had machine guns and mortars. While exact numbers are difficult to determine, it is estimated that some 500,000 men were formal Freikorps members with another 1.5 million participating informally.

In the early days of the German revolution, the Council of the People's Deputies, the revolutionary government led by Friedrich Ebert of the Social Democratic Party, needed reliable troops in Berlin to protect its position. In consultation with the Army High Command (OHL), the Council reached an agreement to form the voluntary Freikorps units. Most of their members were anti-communist monarchists who saw no clear future in the revolutionary Germany that they had returned home to. They did not fight in support of the revolutionary government or the Weimar Republic after it was formed, but against its enemies from the political left, who they saw as Germany's enemies.

Freikorps units suppressed the Marxist Spartacist uprising and were responsible for the extrajudicial executions of revolutionary communist leaders Karl Liebknecht and Rosa Luxemburg on 15 January 1919. The Freikorps also fought in the Baltic against Soviet Russia and were instrumental in putting down the Munich Soviet Republic, the Ruhr uprising and the Third Silesian uprising. The Kapp Putsch of March 1920, a failed attempt to overthrow the government of the Weimar Republic, drew its military support from the Freikorps, in particular the Marinebrigade Ehrhardt. It was after the failure of the Kapp Putsch, and under Allied pressure to keep both Germany's official and unofficial military forces at the 100,000 man limit, that the Freikorps were officially disbanded in the spring of 1920. Some Freikorps members were then accepted into the Reichswehr, Germany's official army, but more joined the Nazi Stormtroopers (SA), illegal far right formations such as the Organisation Consul, or groups such as the Stahlhelm that were associated with political parties.

=== Freikorps units ===
For a list of major Freikorps units during the Weimar era, see Freikorps groups and divisions.

== Citizens' Defense ==
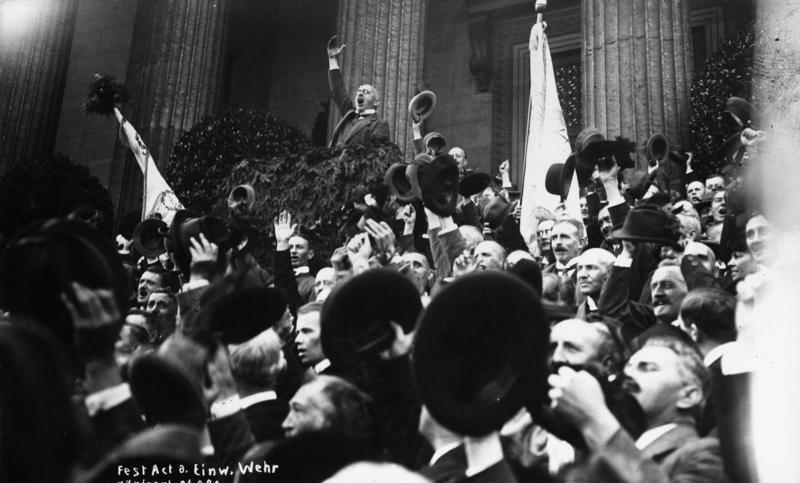
Celebration in 1920 of the Citizens' Defense forces at Munich's Königsplatz

The Citizens' Defense paramilitary groups were voluntary, honorary associations based on part-time membership that performed self-protection tasks in local areas. They emerged in 1918 after the end of the First World War to ensure the maintenance of public order in cooperation with state authorities. After the Spartacist uprising in Berlin in January 1919, the Reichswehr Ministry instructed all general commands on 22 March 1919 to develop local militia groups into centrally controlled citizens' defense groups at the state level according to a uniform model. The newly created units were then to be directly subordinate to the Reichswehr leadership. In an emergency the citizens' defense forces were to serve as an army reserve.

Instead of becoming a pillar of support for the parliamentary system, some of the citizens' defense forces developed into anti-republican groups that were largely outside the control of the government and thus a threat to the Republic. As a result of the Allied disarmament requirements, the Citizens' Defense forces at Reich level were released from their military subordination and placed under the control of the individual state ministries. The Allies continued to regard them as a military reserve formation that was to be disbanded in accordance with the provisions of the Treaty of Versailles. After the failed Kapp Putsch, the Prussian minister of the Interior ordered the dissolution of the Citizens' Defense groups. His order was followed by the other states in the summer of 1920. Only Bavaria, where the groups had been most active, refused to disband its forces and kept them alive for another year.

== Groups affiliated with political parties or movements ==
=== Right-wing to far right ===
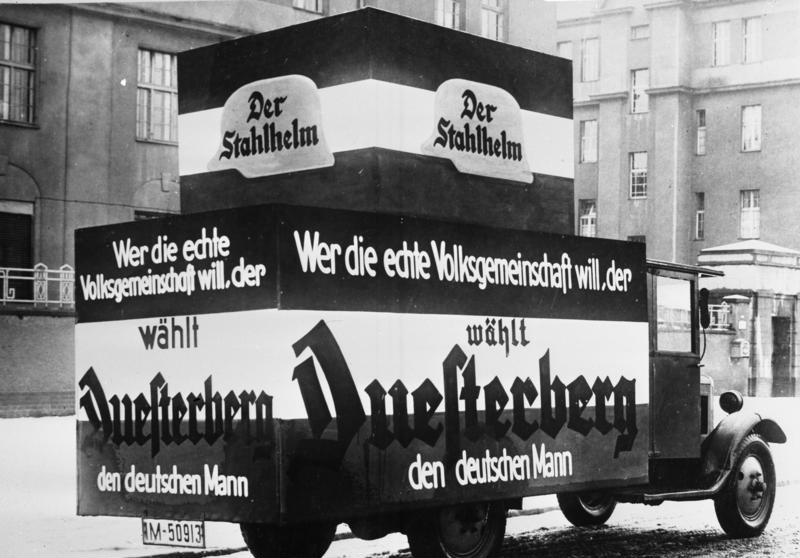
Der Stahlhelm propaganda car in Berlin promoting DNVP nominee Theodor Duesterberg for president of Germany in the 1932 election. The message on the truck reads: "Whoever wants a true people's community votes for Duesterberg, the German man".

- Der Stahlhelm, Bund der Frontsoldaten (The Steel Helmet, League of Front-Line Soldiers), was a veterans' organization formed in December 1918 with about 500,000 members. Led by Franz Seldte and Theodor Duesterberg, and with ties at the leadership level to the Reichswehr, it was opposed to the Weimar Republic and politically close to the German National People's Party (DNVP) and other conservative groups. In 1931, it formed part of the Harzburg Front, an anti-democratic political alliance that included the DNVP, the Nazi Party and the Pan-German League. After the Nazi seizure of power, it was integrated into the SA in 1934 and dissolved in 1935.
- Deutschvölkischer Schutz- und Trutzbund (German Nationalist Protection and Defiance Federation) was an antisemitic Völkisch group founded in February 1919 and led by Alfred Roth. Its membership peaked at about 200,000 when it was banned by the German government in 1922, and it was formally dissolved in 1924. It was notable for its revisionist propaganda regarding Germany's defeat in World War I and for attacking Jews, Social Democrats and middle-class supporters of the republic.
- Organisation Consul (O.C.) was an ultra-nationalist and antisemitic militant secret society formed in 1920 by members of the disbanded Freikorps group Marinebrigade Ehrhardt. Founded and led by former Freikorps commander Hermann Ehrhardt, it had an estimated 5,000 members. It engaged in Feme murders and political assassinations with the aim of destabilizing and overthrowing the republic and replacing it with a right-wing dictatorship. Responsible for hundreds of murders, its two most prominent victims were the former finance minister Matthias Erzberger and Foreign Minister Walther Rathenau. It was banned by the Reich government in July 1922.
- Viking League (German: Bund Wiking) was founded on 2 May 1923 by members of the banned Organisation Consul as its successor organization, and its leaders were Hermann Ehrhardt Eberhard Kautter. It advocated right-wing nationalism, anti-republicanism and a violent overthrow of the republic in favor of a military dictatorship. At its height, it claimed 10,000 members. After plans to overthrow the republic were exposed in May 1926, it was banned in Prussia and its influence declined. Ehrhardt dissolved the league in April 1928.
- Bund Bayern und Reich (Bavaria and Empire League) was founded in June 1922 by Georg Escherich and Hermann Kriebel, who entrusted the leadership to Otto Pittinger, a fellow Einwohnerwehr leader. It was monarchist and supported both the return of the Bavarian Wittelsbach dynasty and Bavarian separatism. It was also anti-Bolshevik, revanchist and opposed to the Treaty of Versailles. Its regional focus was in the rural areas of Swabia and the Palatinate. By 1923, the League numbered nearly 57,000 members and was, by far, the largest patriotic association in Bavaria at that time. However, plans for a coup against the Bavarian government in September 1922 were abandoned and the more radical elements among the associations allied with the League deserted it. The League took no part in the Beer Hall Putsch of November 1923. On 31 January 1924, it dissolved its paramilitary wing, further distancing itself from the radical Völkisch forces. It evolved into a purely political organization associated with the conservative Bavarian People's Party. After Pittinger's death in August 1926, the organization suffered from weakened leadership and an accelerating loss of membership, and it was absorbed into Der Stahlhelm in February 1930.
- Sturmabteilung (SA; Storm Division) was formed by Adolf Hitler at Munich in November 1920, originally as the Nazi Party Gymnastics and Sports Department, and was renamed the SA in October 1921. Most of its members came from the Freikorps. Known as "stormtroopers" or "brownshirts", they protected meetings, marched in rallies and were often involved in street violence against opponents on the political left. The SA was the main component in the Deutscher Kampfbund, took part in the Beer Hall Putsch in November 1923 and was outlawed as a result. The ban was lifted in February 1925 and the SA was re-established. Led by Ernst Röhm between January 1931 and June 1934, it grew to be the largest Nazi paramilitary unit with an estimated 4,500,000 members in 1934. After Hitler's purge of the SA in the Night of the Long Knives of June 1934, it continued to exist, but ceased to play a major political role in Nazi Germany and was outlawed at the end of the Second World War.
- Bund Oberland (Highlands League) was originally formed as the Freikorps Oberland in 1919, and it was reconstituted as the Bund Oberland in October 1921. It was a Völkisch, Pan-German group opposed to provisions of the Treaty of Versailles. After an internal split in September 1922, it was led by Friedrich Weber. About 4,000 strong, it joined the Deutscher Kampfbund in September 1923, took part in the Beer Hall Putsch and was banned in its immediate aftermath. Re-established in March 1925, it underwent sustained declines in both membership and financial support, and Weber left the leadership in December 1929. It was dissolved in March 1933, shortly after the Nazis came to power.
- Wehrverband Reichsflagge (Imperial Flag Defense Association) was based in Franconia and was founded at Nuremberg by Adolf Heiß in October 1920. It was committed to the monarchist movement and supported a return of the Hohenzollern empire. At its height, it had 20,000 members. It briefly was a member of the Deutscher Kampfbund from 2 September to 7 October 1923 when Heiß ordered its withdrawal, precipitating a split in his organization. It did not take part in the Beer Hall Putsch. It experienced a decline in membership and merged into Der Stahlhelm in December 1927.
- Bund Reichskriegsflagge (Imperial War Flag League) was founded by Ernst Röhm in October 1923, and was led by him and Joseph Seydel. It was composed of a breakaway group of four Wehrverband Reichsflagge units from southern Bavaria that defied Heiß's orders to withdraw from the Deutscher Kampfbund. It initially had about 500 members, participated in the Beer Hall Putsch and was outlawed in its wake. After the ban against it was lifted in 1925, it was briefly resurrected but merged with the Tannenbergbund the same year.
- Deutscher Kampfbund (German Battle League) was a short-lived Bavarian umbrella group that initially comprised the SA, the Bund Oberland and the Bund Reichskriegsflagge (later replaced by the Reichskriegsflagge). It was created on 2 September 1923 to consolidate and streamline their agendas after the government in Berlin called off passive resistance to the French and Belgian occupation of the Ruhr. Overall military command was given to Hermann Kriebel, and Hitler was made its political leader on 25 September. It planned and conducted the Beer Hall Putsch and was immediately banned by the Bavarian government after it failed. It was never re-established.

=== Center-right ===
- Bayernwacht (Bavarian Guard) was founded in 1924 on the initiative of Fritz Schäffer to protect BVP events from violent disruption by other paramilitaries. The group proved effective at this task and soon expanded into a more general party paramilitary. Coming under the leadership of Hans Ritter von Lex, the group engaged in frequent battles with the SA and the SS during the last years of the Weimar Republic. After the Nazi's rise to power, the group was dissolved on 13 April 1933.
- Jungdeutscher Orden (Young German Order) was a nationalist and antisemitic association founded by Artur Mahraun. Initially a paramilitary, it changed into a more politically oriented group with the goal of recreating the camaraderie experienced by soldiers at the front during World War I in order to overcome class and social differences in German society. In 1930, its political arm merged with the liberal German Democratic Party to form the short-lived German State Party. The Young German Order was banned by the Nazis in 1933.

=== Center to center-left ===
- Reichsbanner Schwarz-Rot-Gold (Reich Banner Black-Red-Gold) was devoted to the defense of the Weimar Republic. It was founded by former front-line soldiers of the Social Democratic Party of Germany (who made up the majority of the group), the German Democratic Party and the Catholic Centre Party. Organized militarily, its main opponents were the Nazi SA and the Communist Party of Germany's Roter Frontkämpferbund. The Reichsbanner claimed more than three million members at its peak and was banned by the Nazis in 1933.
- Eiserne Front (Iron Front) brought together the Reichsbanner, free labor unions and workers' gymnastics and sports associations in 1931 in response to the far right's Harzburg Front. Not itself organized as a paramilitary, the Iron Front's central goal was to strengthen the Social Democrats in the 1932 Reichstag election.

=== Left-wing to far-left ===
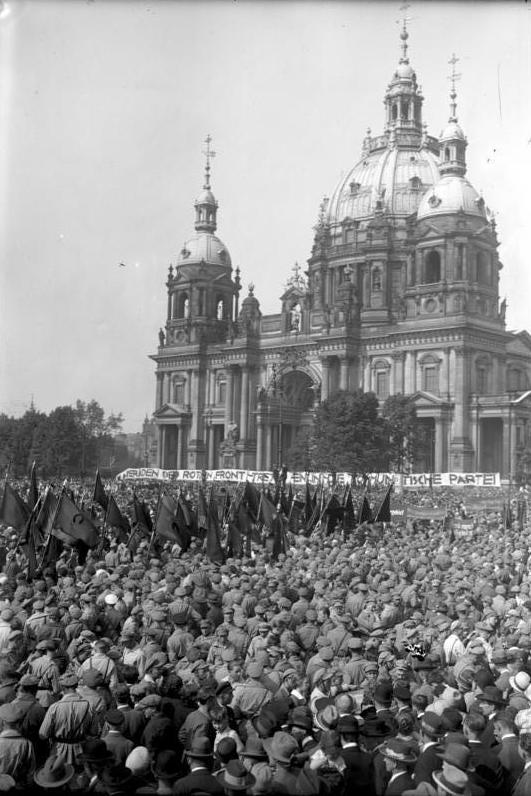
Assembly of the Communist Party's Roter Frontkämpferbund at the Berlin Cathedral in 1928

- Roter Frontkämpferbund (Red Front Fighters' League) was founded by the Communist Party of Germany (KPD) in 1924 and attained a peak membership of 110,000. It was banned across Germany in 1929 after the Blutmai demonstrations in Berlin that left 33 dead. Despite the ban, it engaged in frequent street battles with the Nazi SA until Hitler came to power in 1933.
- Antifaschistische Junge Garde (Young Antifascist Guard) was the youth wing of the KPD and was banned in 1933.
- Kampfbund gegen den Faschismus (Fighting League against Fascism) was the successor to the Roter Frontkämpferbund after it was banned in 1929. The Kampfbund itself was banned in 1933.
- Antifaschistische Aktion (Antifascist Action) was founded in 1932 and affiliated with the KPD. Its primary activity was to boost the KPD campaign during the July 1932 and November 1932 German federal elections. It was banned in 1933.
- Rote Ruhrarmee (Ruhr Red Army) was an army of approximately 50,000 workers that formed in the industrialized Ruhr district during the Kapp Putsch with the goal of establishing a council republic. Not a true paramilitary in structure, it was suppressed with considerable loss of life by government troops and Freikorps units in what was known as the Ruhr uprising (13 March – 12 April 1920).
- Schwarze Scharen (Black Band) were resistance groups of anarchist and anarcho-syndicalist youth affiliated with the Free Workers' Union of Germany (FAUD). The Black Band was banned in 1933.

Similar organisations existed in the First Austrian Republic, most notably the Schutzbund and the Heimwehr.

== See also ==
- Black Reichswehr
- Political violence in Weimar Germany
- Weimar political parties
