= Joseph Seydel =

German Nazi official (1887–1945)

Führer, NSKK-Obergruppe Südost
- In office March 1935 – 10 April 1945

Leiter des Zentralamtes SA Supreme Leadership
- In office November 1931 – February 1935
- Leader: Ernst Röhm

Reichstag Deputy
- In office 31 July 1932 – 6 November 1932
- In office 5 March 1933 – 10 April 1945

Personal details
- Born: 4 February 1887 Munich, Kingdom of Bavaria, German Empire
- Died: 10 April 1945 (aged 58) Burghausen, Nazi Germany
- Party: Nazi Party (NSDAP)
- Civilian awards: Blood Order

Military service
- Allegiance: German Empire
- Branch/service: Royal Bavarian Army
- Rank: Hauptmann
- Unit: 3rd Royal Bavarian Field Artillery Regiment
- Military awards: Iron Cross, 1st and 2nd class Military Merit Order (Bavaria), 4th class Saxe-Ernestine House Order, Commander's Cross 2nd class with swords

Joseph Seydel (also Josef; 4 February 1887 – 10 April 1945) was a German professional military officer, a Freikorps participant, a paramilitary opponent of the Weimar Republic and a politician of the Nazi Party (NSDAP). As one of the leaders of the Bund Reichskriegsflagge, he was a participant in Adolf Hitler's failed Beer Hall Putsch of 1923. Seydel was a protégé of Ernst Röhm and, after the Nazi seizure of power, was made a member of the Supreme Leadership of the Sturmabteilung (SA), the Nazi paramilitary organization. He later became an NSKK-Obergruppenführer in the National Socialist Motor Corps. He served as a deputy in the Reichstag from 1932 until his death.

== Early years and military service ==
Seydel was born in Munich, the son of physician Karl von Seydel, who became the Bavarian Army Surgeon General, and his wife Luise (née Koch). After attending the Wilhelmsgymnasium in Munich for three years, Seydel spent six years in the Bavarian Cadet Corps to prepare for a career as a military officer. In 1906, he obtained his Abitur and was commissioned as a Fähnrich in the 3rd Royal Bavarian Field Artillery Regiment "Prince Leopold". The following year, he was assigned to the War School, where one of his fellow students was the later Nazi politician Ernst Röhm. In 1908, Seydel was promoted to Leutnant. In 1910 and 1911, he completed advanced training at the Royal Bavarian Artillery and Engineering School. In 1913, he attended the riding academy at the Maximilian II Barracks.

During the First World War, Seydel served on the western front from 1914 to 1918 and held the rank of Hauptmann at the end of the war. He was awarded both classes of the Iron Cross, the Bavarian Military Merit Order, 4th class with swords and the Saxe-Ernestine House Order, Commander's Cross 2nd class with swords. In 1916, he married Lotte Schöning, with whom he had two sons and one daughter.

== Paramilitary activity in the Weimar Republic ==
After the end of the war, Seydel pursued university studies in philosophy and economics. He also joined the paramilitary Freikorps Werdenfels and participated in the suppression of the Bavarian Soviet Republic, later transferring to the Freikorps Epp. In 1920, he was active in the leadership of the Bavarian Einwohnerwehr, a civil defense militia unit. Between 1922 and 1923, and again from 1925 to 1931, he worked in commercial positions.

In January 1923, Seydel joined the Nazi Party. On 25 September 1923, he participated in a secret meeting of the leadership of the Kampfbund (Combat League), a recently-formed alliance of the Wehrverband Reichsflagge, the Bund Oberland, and the Nazi paramilitary unit, the Sturmabteilung (SA). At this meeting, Adolf Hitler was granted overall political leadership of the Kampfbund, which provide the forces for the November 1923 Beer Hall Putsch. A split in the Wehrverband Reichsflagge resulted in the withdrawal of its northern Bavarian units from the new umbrella organization on 7 October, but four southern Bavarian units under Röhm remained, which he renamed the Bund Reichskriegsflagge on 11 October. Röhm appointed his trusted colleague Seydel as the nominal Bundesführer, though he retained de facto military control of the new organization.

On 8–9 November 1923, Seydel participated, along with Hitler and Röhm, in the failed putsch in Munich, for which he later would be awarded the Blood Order. He was arrested, spent four-and-a-half months in pre-trial detention and stood trial before the Bavarian People's Court. On 12 May 1924, Seydel and six other defendants, including Gregor Strasser, were found guilty of aiding and abetting treason and were sentenced to the statutory minimum of fifteen months of fortress confinement and a small fine. The sentences were suspended and they were placed on probation until 1 May 1928.

Later in 1924, Seydel helped Röhm establish the Frontbann, a successor front organization to the banned SA, where he served as second in command to Röhm. He was again briefly detained from September to October of that year on suspicion of continuing to be active in prohibited associations.

== Nazi Party career ==
On 1 November 1931, Seydel rejoined the Nazi Party (membership number 530,786). After Röhm became Stabschef (chief of staff) of the SA in January 1931, he staffed the organization with former Bavarian military officers such as Seydel, whom he knew and trusted. Seydel was made Leiter des Zentralamtes (central office leader) in the Supreme SA Leadership at SA headquarters in Munich in November 1931, reaching the rank of SA-Gruppenführer in 1934. He also authored publications on air-raid and gas attack protection. In February 1935, Seydel was assigned to lead the Motor Transport Inspectorate West in Dortmund. In March, he was transferred from the SA to the National Socialist Motor Corps (NSKK), where he served as Führer der NSKK-Obergruppe Südost. Hitler promoted him to the rank of NSKK-Obergruppenführer on 20 April 1936.

In addition to his activities in the paramilitary, Seydel also pursued a political career. In the 31 July 1932 Reichstag election, he was elected as a Nazi Party deputy for electoral constituency 29 (Leipzig). He lost his mandate in the 6 November 1932 election but was re-elected at the 5 March 1933 election from constituency 28 (Dresden–Bautzen). He switched to represent constituency 16 (South Hanover–Braunschweig) at the 29 March 1936 election and served in the Reichstag until his death in 1945. Seydel also served as a lay judge at the Volksgerichtshof in 1944, and participated in trials that sentenced to death opponents of the regime.

== Publications ==
- Handbuch für den Luftschutz. J. C. Huber, Dießen vor München, 1931.

== Sources ==
- Campbell, Bruce (1998). The SA Generals and the Rise of Nazism. Lexington: University Press of Kentucky. ISBN 978-0-813-12047-8.
- Herlemann, Beatrix; Schatz, Helga (2004). Biographisches Lexikon niedersächsischer Parlamentarier 1919–1945. Hanover: Verlag Hahnsche Buchhandlung. ISBN 978-3-775-26022-0.
- Jablonsky, David (1989). The Nazi Party in Dissolution. London: Frank Cass and Company, Ltd. ISBN 0-71463-322-4.
- Stockhorst, Erich (1985). 5000 Köpfe: Wer War Was im 3. Reich. Kiel: Arndt Verlag. ISBN 978-3-887-41116-9.
