= Adolf Heiß =

German military/paramilitary officer (1882–unknown)

Führer Wehrverband Reichsflagge
- In office 11 October 1920 – 1 December 1927

Personal details
- Born: 16 March 1882 Schwaiganger, Kingdom of Bavaria, German Empire
- Died: Missing since January 1945 (MIA) Obornik, Reichsgau Wartheland, Nazi Germany

Military service
- Allegiance: German Empire; Nazi Germany
- Branch/service: Royal Bavarian Army; Reichswehr; German Army
- Years of service: 1903–1918; 1919–1923; 1932–1945
- Rank: Hauptmann; Oberst

Adolf Heiß (16 March 1882 – unknown, missing since January 1945) was a German career military officer of the German Empire who fought in the First World War. Between 1920 and 1927, he founded and led the Wehrverband Reichsflagge (Imperial Flag Defense Association), a paramilitary organization opposed to the Weimar Republic. He withdrew the bulk of his organization from the more militant Deutscher Kampfbund in October 1923 and did not participate in November's failed Beer Hall Putsch, led by Adolf Hitler. In December 1927, after a period of declining membership, Heiß merged his organization into Der Stahlhelm, the German veterans' association. Rejoining the German armed forces in 1932, he fought with the Wehrmacht in the Second World War and went missing on the eastern front in the closing months of the war.

== Early life and war service in the German Empire ==
Heiß was born in Schwaiganger near Murnau am Staffelsee in Bavaria, and joined an infantry regiment of the Royal Bavarian Army in 1903. In 1905, he was commissioned as a Leutnant. Between 1914 and 1918, he served in the First World War. By 1916, he had been promoted to the rank of Hauptmann. Following Germany's surrender at the end of the war in November 1918, Heiß was assigned as the commander of a border guard battalion.

In 1919, Heiß was accepted as an officer of the Reichswehr, the severely reduced armed forces of the Weimar Republic, where he served until retiring in 1923. During the German revolution of 1918–1919, he raised the eponymous Heimatschutzbataillon Heiß (Home Guard Battalion Heiß) at his garrison in Nuremberg in the early summer of 1919, with the aim of suppressing civil disturbances. On 17 March 1920, this unit was deployed against demonstrating workers in Nuremberg that rose in protest against the Kapp Putsch, a right-wing revolt that sought to overthrow the republic.

== Paramilitary leader in the Weimar Republic ==
On 11 October 1920, Heiß organized a paramilitary unit that he named the Wehrverband Reichsflagge (Imperial Flag Defense Association), also sometimes referred to as the Bund Reichsflagge (Imperial Flag League). It was the only such organization to have its regional stronghold in Franconia. This was a conservative, right-wing and Völkish organization that opposed the republic and supported a return of the Hohenzollern monarchy. As such, it enjoyed the support of many conservative wealthy industrialists and business owners, as well as much of the middle class. On 4 February 1923, Heiß approved the Reichsflagge joining the Arbeitsgemeinschaft der Vaterländischen Kampfverbände (Working Group of Patriotic Combat Leagues), a new coalition founded by Ernst Röhm that sought to serve as an umbrella organization for forces opposed to the Weimar government. This was a loose amalgamation of independent groups and decisions were made by consultations among the individual leaders. Apart from the Reichsflagge, the major components were Adolf Hitler's Sturmabteilung (SA) and the Bund Oberland, led by Friedrich Weber. Smaller components included the Vaterländische Vereine München (VVM), the Kreis Niederbayern, the Bund Unterland and the Organisation Lenz. Plans for a protest demonstration on May Day to include violent assaults on left-wing groups led to internal dissension, with the VVM and the Organization Lenz voting not to participate, which resulted in a fracturing of the alliance.

At the Deutscher Tag (German Day) rally in Nuremberg on 1–2 September, a renewed coalition named the Deutscher Kampfbund was formed, replacing the Arbeitsgemeinschaft and consisting of the SA, the Bund Oberland and the Reichsflagge. A public manifesto was issued that Heiß signed along with Hitler and Weber, which called for the overthrow of the republic and the repudiation of the Treaty of Versailles. On 25 September, this new entity placed itself under the political leadership of Hitler, who began actively anticipating more radical measures, with preparations being made for a putsch against the government. This sparked opposition from the Reichsflagge's more moderate supporters, who pressured Heiß to order the withdrawal of his organization from the Kampfbund on 7 October. However, whereas most of the northern Bavarian branches obeyed, four southern Bavarian chapters, under the leadership of Röhm, refused to leave the Kampfbund and were removed from the Reichsflagge. On 11 October, Röhm reconstituted the minority breakaway group as the Bund Reichskriegsflagge (Imperial War Flag League). Therefore, Heiß and his Wehrverband Reichsflagge took no part in the subsequent Beer Hall Putsch of 8–9 November 1923, staged by the Kampfbund and led by Hitler, Röhm and Erich Ludendorff. Consequently, when the putsch leaders were arrested and the Kampfbund components were banned by the Bavarian government in the aftermath of the aborted coup, Heiß and the Reichsflagge were not adversely affected.

Heiß steered the Wehrverband Reichsflagge to a more moderate political course, and avoided more radical moves that could result in it being outlawed. It suffered further schisms from those seeking more radical actions and, like all other paramilitary organizations, it increasingly lost membership, momentum and financial support as the general political situation in the Weimar Republic stabilized over the next few years. On 1 December 1927, Heiß formally incorporated the Reichsflagge into Der Stahlhelm, the large and comparatively moderate German veterans association.

On 7 February 1929, Heiß faced legal charges of violating the Law for the Protection of the Republic. When addressing a public assembly in Wurzburg on 27 October 1928, he allegedly characterized the national colors of black, red and gold as the "colors of mutineers". He refuted the charges and denied making the remarks. However, eyewitness testimony, including that of the Oberbürgermeister of Wurzburg, convinced the court of his guilt. He was fined 300 Reichsmark and ordered to pay all court costs. Heiß's old comrades from the Kampfbund never forgave him for his alleged "defection" in 1923. He received fierce criticism in the more extremist right-wing press and, after the Nazi seizure of power, he was never entrusted with a significant political role.

== Return to military service in Nazi Germany ==
In 1932, Heiß was reactivated in the Reichswehr as a Major. Following the outbreak of the Second World War in 1939, he served in the Wehrmacht, first as an Oberstleutnant and, from 1942, as an Oberst. He went missing in the closing months of the war on the eastern front near Obornik (today, Oborniki, Poland), then in the Reichsgau Wartheland.

== Sources ==
- Bullock, Alan (1964). Hitler: A Study in Tyranny. New York: Harper & Row. ISBN 978-0-061-31123-9.
- Gordon, Harold J. (1972). Hitler and the Beer Hall Putsch. Princeton, N.J.: Princeton University Press. ISBN 978-0-691-05189-5.
- Hübner, Christoph (11 May 2006): Reichsflagge, 1919-1927 in Historisches Lexikon Bayerns.
- Jablonsky, David (1989). The Nazi Party in Dissolution. London: Frank Cass and Company, Ltd. ISBN 0-71463-322-4.
- Nußer, Horst (1990). Konservative Wehrverbände in Bayern, Preußen und Österreich 1918–33. Mit einer Biographie des Forstrates Georg Escherich 1870–1941. Munich: Nußer Verlag. ISBN 3-88091-249-1.
