= Freikorps Oberland =

German paramilitary organization

Freikorps Oberland Bund Oberland
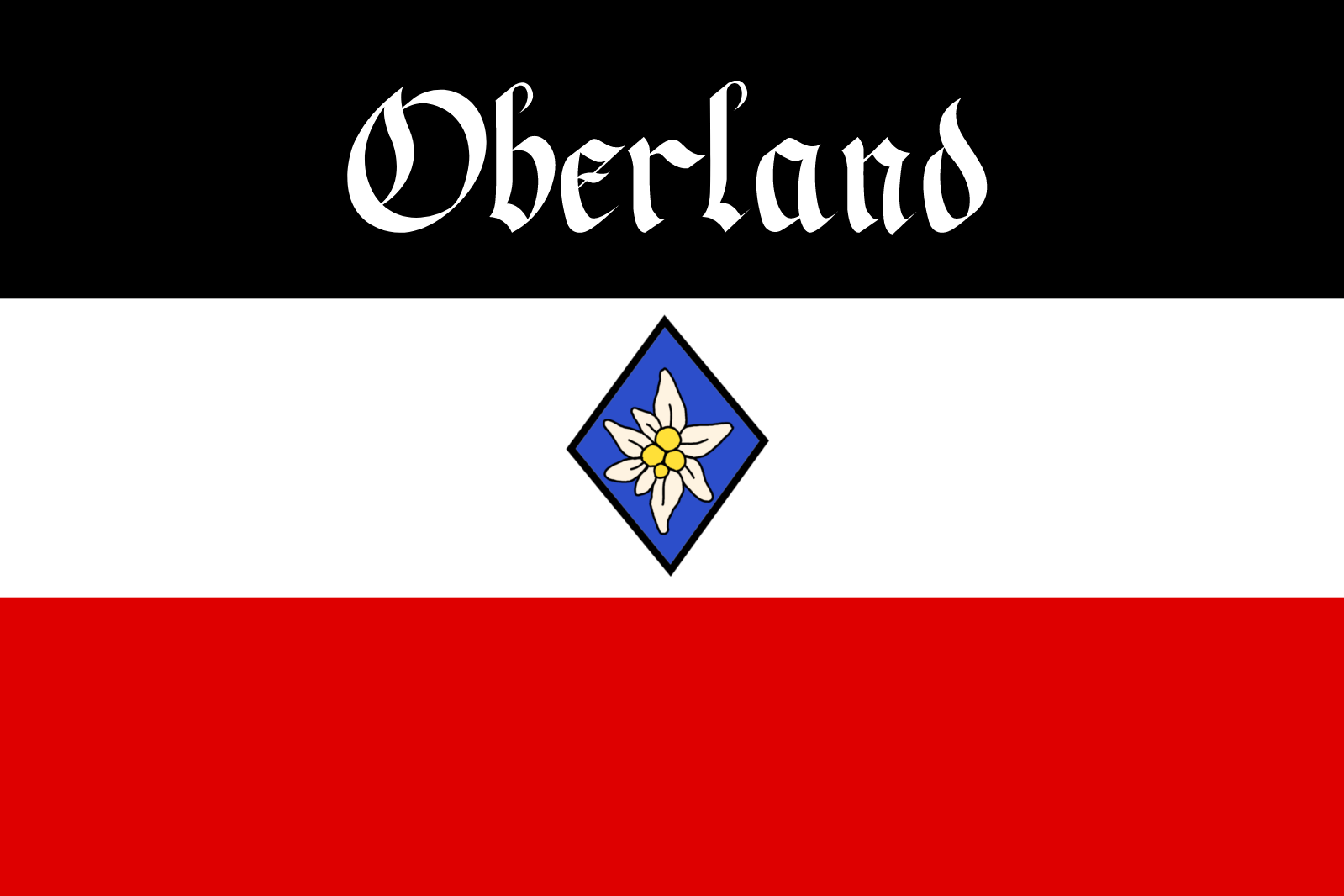
- Flag of the Freikorps Oberland, displaying the Edelweiss emblem (1920)
- Active: April 1919 – October 1919; October 1921 – November 1923; March 1925 – March 1933
- Country: Germany
- Allegiance: German Reich
- Branch: Reichswehr
- Type: Freikorps; Paramilitary
- Role: Suppression of civil disorders and uprisings
- Size: 250–4,000
- Engagements: German Revolution of 1918–1919; Bavarian Soviet Republic; Kapp Putsch; Ruhr Uprising; Third Silesian Uprising; Battle of Annaberg; Beer Hall Putsch (as Bund Oberland)

Commanders
- Commanders: Albert von Beckh; Friedrich Weber

The Freikorps Oberland (English: Highlands Free Corps) was a voluntary paramilitary unit that was formed in Bavaria during the early days of the Weimar Republic, following the end of the First World War and the German Revolution of 1918–1919. After overthrowing a short-lived communist government in Bavaria, it was incorporated into the Reichswehr in October 1919 and participated in the suppression of popular insurrections in the Ruhr and Upper Silesia. Reconstituted as the Bund Oberland (English: Highlands League) in October 1921, it participated in Adolf Hitler's failed Beer Hall Putsch of November 1923 before being banned. A final iteration was founded in March 1925 and was eventually largely absorbed into the Sturmabteilung (SA) in March 1933 following the Nazi seizure of power.

== Existence as a Freikorps ==
=== Founding ===
In the chaotic days of the German Revolution of 1918–1919, the government of Bavaria headed by Minister-President Johannes Hoffmann fled from the capital of Munich to Bamberg after a communist coup proclaimed the Bavarian Soviet Republic on 6 April 1919. Hoffmann authorized the recruitment of "temporary volunteer units" to preserve order and, in response, Rudolf von Sebottendorf, president of the Thule Society – a Völkisch militant league – began organizing a Freikorps force. The first recruits were raised at Ingolstadt and Eichstätt under the command of Major Albert von Beckh in mid-April 1919. Since the volunteers of the initial units hailed predominantly from the Bavarian highlands, the unit took the name Freikorps Oberland and adopted the alpine Edelweiss as its emblem. However, friction arose between the civilian and military leadership, and the Freikorps broke its ties with the Thule Society shortly after its formation.

=== Military campaigns in Bavaria, the Ruhr and Upper Silesia ===
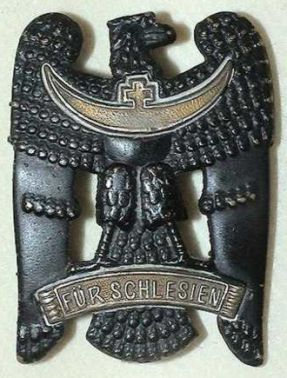
The Silesian Eagle badge: awarded to Freikorps Oberland members who fought in the Silesian Uprisings and served in the unit for at least three months

The Freikorps Oberland initially consisted of approximately 250 men and participated in the violent suppression of the forces of the Bavarian Soviet Republic in early May 1919, which enabled Hoffmann to return to Munich and resume the direction of the government. To comply with the increasingly insistent pressure from the Allies for the dissolution of paramilitary units, which they considered a violation of the terms of the Treaty of Versailles, the Freikorps Oberland was incorporated into the provisional Reichswehr in October 1919 as part of Schützen-Brigade 21, with its headquarters in Munich. They next were deployed to put down a left-wing workers revolt during the Ruhr uprising in March and April 1920, which was a response to the Kapp Putsch, an unsuccessful right-wing attempt to overthrow the Weimar Republic. During the suppression of the Third Silesian Uprising in May 1921, they played a pivotal role in the crucial Battle of Annaberg in Upper Silesia against Polish forces. In 1923, a monument was erected in their honor above Schliersee in Bavaria. While in Upper Silesia, the Freikorps also formed an assassination squad and is presumed to have commissioned Feme murders and kidnappings.

=== Membership in citizens' militias ===
In Bavaria, close ties existed between a multitude of right-wing extremist organizations. The murderers of former finance minister Matthias Erzberger – Heinrich Tillessen and Heinrich Schulz – belonged not only to the Organisation Consul but also to the Arbeitsgemeinschaft Oberland (Oberland Workgroup). Many former members of the Freikorps Oberland who had not enlisted in the Reichswehr were active in the Organisation Escherich, a citizens' militia (Einwohnerwehr) that engaged in violence against left-wing politicians. There are indications linking its members to the murder of Karl Gareis, the USPD faction leader in the Landtag of Bavaria, on 9 June 1921. This continuing violence led to increased pressure from the Allies for the general disarmament of the remaining armed components. Following the Kapp Putsch, Carl Severing, the Prussian minister of the interior, ordered the dissolution of the militias. This ban subsequently was adopted by both the national government and other individual states in the summer of 1920. In Bavaria, the state government resisted, and the Organisation Escherich was only officially dissolved on 27 June 1921.

== Reorganization into the Bund Oberland ==
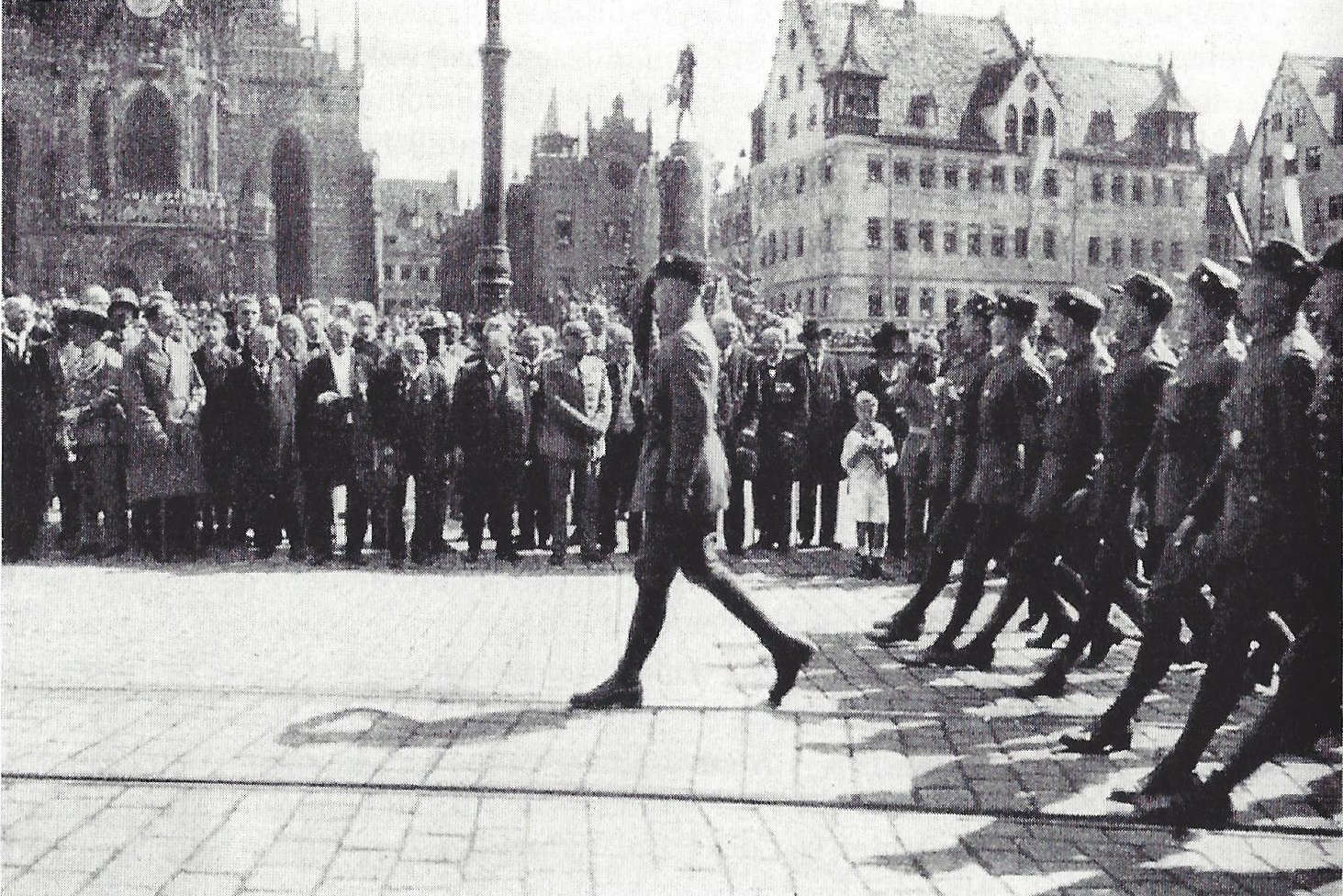
Bund Oberland forces marching before Adolf Hitler in Nuremberg on 2 September 1923

Following the dissolution of the paramilitary units and militias, former members of the Freikorps Oberland reorganized on 31 October 1921 and styled the new entity the Bund Oberland (Highlands League). Its official program described it as a civilian patriotic Völkisch and Pan-German organization. Members took an oath to fight for the restoration of the greatness of the German Reich and to oppose the provisions of the Treaty of Versailles. In reality, however, the Bund continued to focus on clandestine paramilitary activities. It would grow to become one of the largest and most powerful of the paramilitary units in Germany. In September 1922, a split occurred within the Bund; the more moderate minority wing split off to form the Bund Treu Oberland – later renamed the Blücherbund – whereas the larger and more militaristic wing retained the name Bund Oberland under the leadership of Friedrich Weber.

While the Bund Oberland officially numbered only a few hundred members in 1922, by November 1923, its membership had grown to approximately 2,000 in Bavaria alone. This membership included university students, professionals, and white-collar employees, as well as working-class laborers. The military leaders were predominantly young former junior officers, many of whom were pursuing university studies. Most members were between 20 and 30 years of age and possessed combat experience, either as veterans of the World War or as participants of the conflicts in Bavaria, the Ruhr and Upper Silesia. The Bund had access to a large supply of weaponry, reportedly including heavy armaments. Many of its weapons were stored and maintained by the Reichswehr. The Bund received financial support from Weber's father-in-law, the Völkisch publisher Julius Friedrich Lehmann.

Under Weber's leadership, the Bund Oberland increasingly aligned itself with the radical forces led by Adolf Hitler and Ernst Röhm. The Bund, together with the Nazi Party's paramilitary unit, the Sturmabteilung (SA), the Wehrverband Reichsflagge and several smaller groups, joined forces to form the Arbeitsgemeinschaft vaterländischer Kampfverbände (Working Group of Patriotic Combat Leagues) in February 1923. However, this loose arrangement proved unwieldy and broke apart by May. On 2 September 1923, at a commemorative celebration of the Battle of Sedan known as German Day (Deutscher Tag), Weber's Bund Oberland joined with the Sturmabteilung under Hermann Göring and the Wehrverband Reichsflagge headed by Adolf Heiß to form the Deutscher Kampfbund (German Combat League). This new amalgamation placed itself under the political leadership of Hitler on 25 September 1923. A split in the Wehrverband Reichsflagge resulted in the withdrawal of northern Bavarian units from the new umbrella organization on 7 October, but the southern Bavarian units under Röhm remained, now renamed the Bund Reichskriegsflagge.

=== Participation in the Beer Hall Putsch ===
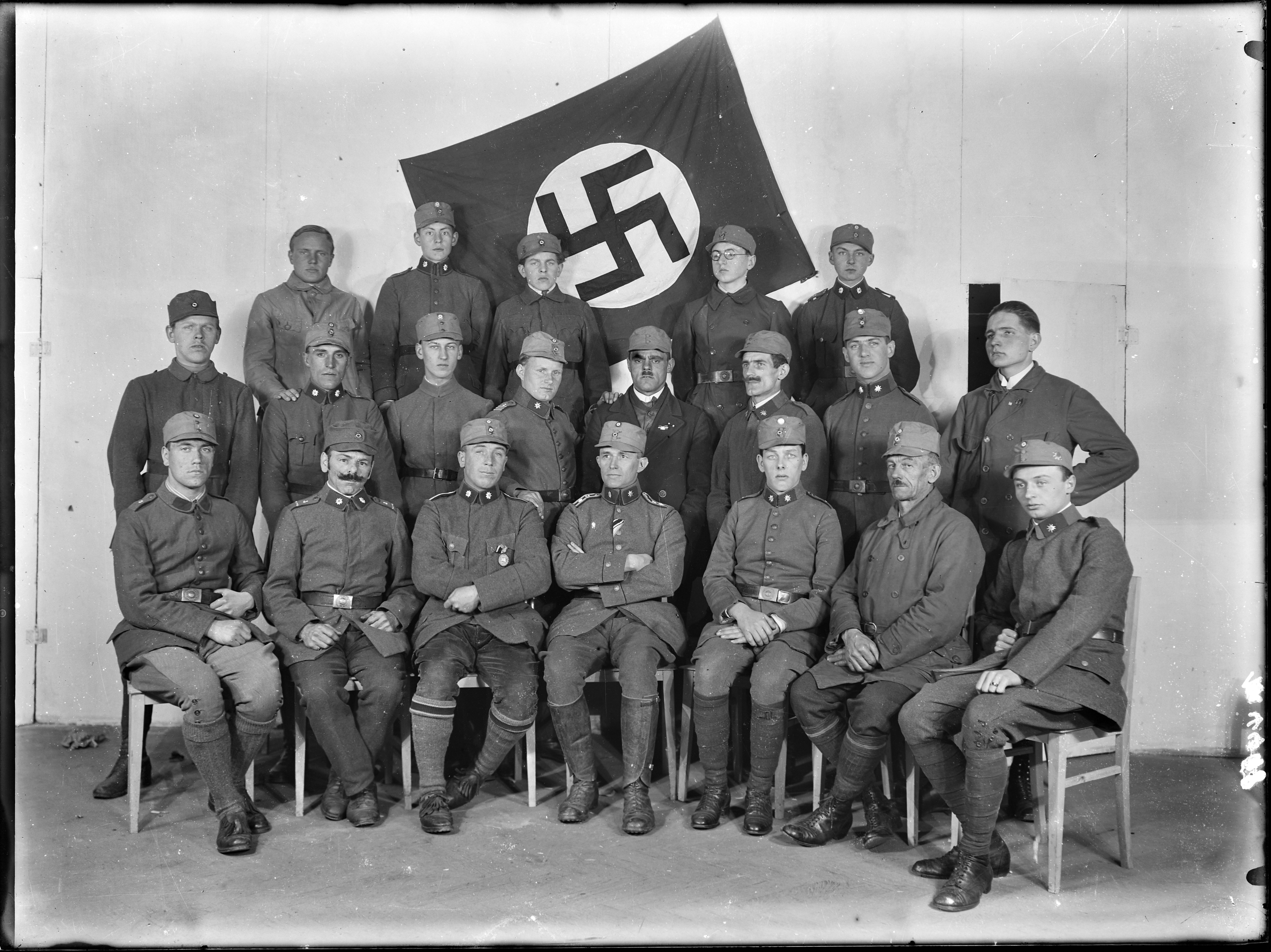
An SA-Sturm photographed c. 1923. Many members are wearing Freikorps Oberland uniforms with an Edelweiss collar badge.

On 8–9 November 1923, the Bund, by now some 4,000 strong, actively participated in Hitler's failed Beer Hall Putsch at Munich. Weber personally took part in the march on the Feldherrnhalle with Hitler, Röhm and Erich Ludendorff. Due to its involvement in the attempted coup, the Bund Oberland, together with the other Deutscher Kampfbund components, was outlawed in Bavaria on 9 November 1923 by a decree of the Bavarian General State Commissioner Gustav Ritter von Kahr. Weber was arrested the same day, and subsequently was brought to trial with Hitler and other coup leaders in February 1924. He appeared in court attired in a military uniform complete with dress sword and wearing the blue cap of the banned Bund Oberland. At the conclusion of the trial on 1 April, he was found guilty of treason and sentenced to five years of fortress confinement at Landsberg prison, with credit for time served and eligible for parole in six months.

=== Aftermath ===
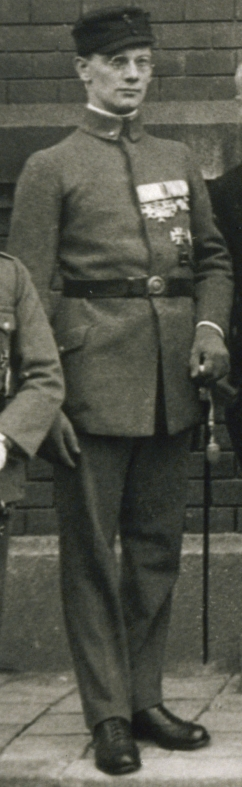
Friedrich Weber at the Beer Hall Putsch trial, on 1 April 1924

With Weber incarcerated, elements of the former Bund continued to operate clandestinely. In a particularly notorious action, a former Bund member, Franz Hellinger conspired with the right-wing extremist terrorist organization Organisation Consul to assassinate the separatist leader Franz Josef Heinz in the French-occupied Rhenish Palatinate on 9 January 1924. On Weber's orders, former members of the banned Bund Oberland refused attempts to integrate them into the Frontbann, an SA front organization being organized by Röhm. Weber preferred to maintain his independence and freedom of action. A successor front organization to the Bund called the Deutscher Schützen- und Wanderbund (German Shooting and Hiking League) was established on 20 July 1924. An investigation by the state prosecutor found grounds to charge Weber and the leaders of this organization with continuing to effectively operate the Bund in violation of the ban. Consequently, he was not paroled in December 1924 with Hitler.

== Reestablishment, decline and final dissolution ==
Following the lifting of the ban on the Bund on 14 February 1925, Weber was released from prison as part of a general amnesty and the Bund was officially re-founded on 13 March. However, with the increasing political stability of the Weimar Republic, the Bund experienced a loss of membership and influence. At its annual membership meeting in December 1929, Weber proposed that the Bund, by then severely weakened in terms of both finances and membership, be merged into the Nazi Party. This proposal was rejected, prompting Weber to resign the League's leadership. Further rifts emerged within the organization, with many members defecting to other organizations, including the SA. Shortly after the Nazi seizure of power, the Bund Oberland was disbanded in March 1933, along with other paramilitary units, such as the Young German Order and the Bayernwacht.

Though many former members were absorbed into the SA, some remained opposed to the Nazi regime. One notable former member, Beppo Römer, the former chief of staff of the Freikorps Oberland and planner of the assault on the Annaberg, gravitated to the communist opposition and was imprisoned in Dachau concentration camp from 1934 to 1939. After his release, he established resistance groups in Munich and Berlin with former Freikorps comrades. Together with his associates, he distributed leaflets calling for a popular uprising against Hitler, until he was arrested in February 1942 and executed in September 1944.

== Post-war association ==
After the end of World War II, former members rallied around Ernst Horadam, who had commanded the Freikorps Oberland at the Annaberg battle, and founded the heritage association Kameradschaft Freikorps und Bund Oberland (Comradeship of the Freikorps and Bund Oberland) in 1951, which was regarded as a right-wing extremist organization. In Schliersee, the monument to the fallen members of the 1921 Freikorps Oberland was destroyed by American forces in 1945. However, the Kameradschaft continued to hold an annual memorial church service near the site every year, up to and including 2006. Organizations that regularly participated in the event included the Landsmannschaft Schlesien, the Landsmannschaft der Oberschlesier and the Junge Landsmannschaft Ostdeutschland. In addition, individuals from various far-right organizations, such as the National Democratic Party of Germany and the Junge Nationalisten (Young Nationalists) also took part. According to a statement by the president of Landsmannschaft Schlesien, the event was regularly monitored by the State Office for the Protection of the Constitution. Since 2007, the commemoration has taken place on a small scale.

== Selected members ==
Many former members of the Freikorps and Bund Oberland went on to attain prominence in Nazi Germany as officers in the SA, the SS or the Wehrmacht. Some were involved in the crimes of the regime, including the Holocaust, and many were later convicted of war crimes. A smaller number opposed the dictatorship and some actively worked for its overthrow.

- Richard Arauner (1902–1936), SS-Oberführer in the SS Race and Settlement Main Office
- Karl Astel (1898–1945), SS-Standartenführer and Nazi eugenicist
- Eleonore Baur (1885–1981), nurse in the Dachau concentration camp
- Albert von Beckh (1870–1958), SS-Gruppenführer, first commander of Freikorps Oberland
- Horst Böhme (1909–1945), SS-Oberführer, involved in the Lidice massacre, commander of Einsatzgruppen B and C
- Ferdinand Brandner (1903–1986), SS-Standartenführer and aircraft engine designer
- Ernest Peter Burger (1906–1975), German-American saboteur involved in Operation Pastorius
- Kurt Benson (1902–1942), SS-Oberführer, led the Kristallnacht pogrom in Hanover
- Adolf Ritter von Denk (1886–?), NSKK-Obergruppenführer and Stabsführer of the National Socialist Motor Corps
- Josef Dietrich (1892–1966), SS-Oberstgruppenführer and Generaloberst der Waffen-SS, convicted war criminal
- Anton Dunckern (1905–1985), SS-Brigadeführer, commander of Einsatzgruppe II, SS and Police Leader in Metz, convicted war criminal
- Fritz Fischer (1908–1999), historian, member of the Nazi Party and the SA
- Heinrich Gattineau (1905–1985), SA-Standartenführer, economist and executive of IG Farben
- Karl Gebhardt (1897–1948), SS-Gruppenführer, conducted medical experimentation in Ravensbrück concentration camp, convicted war criminal
- Franz Gutsmiedl (1901–1944), Agriculture Department leader in the NSBO, Reichstag deputy
- Wilhelm Harster (1904–1991), SS-Gruppenführer, commander of security police and SD forces in Kraków, the Netherlands and northern Italy, convicted war criminal
- Franz Hayler (1900–1972), SS-Gruppenführer, State Secretary in the Reich Ministry of Economics
- Richard Hildebrandt (1897–1951), SS-Obergruppenführer, chief of the SS Race and Settlement Main Office, convicted war criminal
- Heinrich Himmler (1900–1945), Reichsführer-SS and Chief of the German Police
- Hans Hinkel (1901–1960), SS-Gruppenführer, head of the film department in the Ministry of Propaganda
- Ernst Horadam (1883–1956), SA-Obersturmbannführer and a commander of the Freikorps Oberland
- Friedrich Gustav Jaeger (1895–1944), Oberst in the Wehrmacht and member of the 20 July plot
- Rudolf Jordan (1902–1988), SA-Obergruppenführer, Gauleiter of Magdeburg
- Richard Kaaserer (1896–1947), SS-Oberführer, SS and Police Leader in Serbia and Norway, convicted war criminal
- Max Koegel (1895–1946), SS-Obersturmbannführer, commander of Ravensbrück, Majdanek and Flossenbürg concentration camps
- Albert Krebs (1898–1974), Gauleiter of Hamburg, editor of a Nazi newspapers
- Gerhard Krüger (1908–1994), Nazi student leader and co-founder of the Socialist Reich Party, a neo-Nazi party
- Max Lebsche (1886–1957), surgeon and professor of medicine, opponent of the Nazi regime
- Emil Maurice (1897–1972), SS-Oberführer and first Supreme SA Leader
- Karl Mauss (1898–1959), General der Panzertruppe in the Wehrmacht
- Josef Albert Meisinger (1899–1947), SS-Standartenführer, Gestapo officer, Einsatzgruppe IV commander in Poland, convicted war criminal
- Reinhold Muchow (1905–1933), a leader in the NSBO and the German Labour Front
- Carl von Oberkamp (1893–1947), SS-Brigadeführer and Generalmajor der Waffen-SS
- Theodor Oberländer (1905–1998), SA-Obersturmführer, later a government minister in West Germany
- Maximilian du Prel (1904–1945), SS-Sturmbannführer, Nazi propagandist and press chief of the General Government in occupied Poland
- Hanns Albin Rauter (1895–1949) SS-Obergruppenführer, Higher SS and Police Leader in the Netherlands, convicted war criminal
- Heinz Reinefarth (1903–1979), SS-Gruppenführer and Generalleutnant der Waffen-SS, involved in the suppression of the Warsaw Uprising
- Arthur Rödl (1898–1945), SS-Standartenführer and commandant of Gross-Rosen concentration camp
- Josef Römer (1892–1944), jurist, later a communist and resistance member
- Ferdinand von Sammern-Frankenegg(1897–1944), SS-Brigadeführer and SS and Police Leader of Warsaw who directed deportations from the Warsaw Ghetto
- Julian Scherner (1895–1945), SS-Oberführer and SS and Police Leader of Kraków involved in the destruction of the Kraków Ghetto
- Philipp Schmitt (1902–1950), SS-Sturmbannführer, commandant of Fort Breendonk prison camp in Belgium, convicted war criminal
- Fritz von Scholz (1896–1944), SS-Gruppenführer and Generalleutnant der Waffen-SS
- Walther Schröder (1902–1973), SS-Brigadeführer, SS and Police Leader in Latvia and Estonia
- Walter Schuhmann (1898–1956), SS-Standartenführer, Reichstag deputy and leader of the NSBO
- Erwin Schulz (1900–1981), SS-Brigadeführer and commander of Einsatzkommando 5
- Ernst Rüdiger Starhemberg (1899–1956), Austrofascist politician, opponent of the Nazi regime
- Wilhelm Stegmann (1899–1944), SA-Gruppenführer and Reichstag deputy, later left the Nazi Party, founded the Freikorps Franken and was imprisoned
- Bodo Uhse (1904–1963), writer, Nazi supporter but later a communist
- Hilmar Wäckerle (1899–1941), SS-Standartenführer and commandant of Dachau concentration camp
- Gerhard Wagner (1888–1944), SA-Obergruppenführer, Reich Health Leader
- Friedrich Weber, (1892–1954), SS-Gruppenführer, head of Bund Oberland, head of the Reich Veterinary Association
- Wilhelm Weiss (1892–1950), SA-Obergruppenführer, editor-in-chief of the Völkischer Beobachter

== Sources ==
- Gordon, Harold J. (1972). Hitler and the Beer Hall Putsch. Princeton, N.J.: Princeton University Press. ISBN 978-0-691-05189-5.
- Herbert, Ulrich (1996). Best: Biographische Studien über Radikalismus, Weltanschauung und Vernunft, 1903–1989. Bonn: Verlag J.H.W. Dietz GmbH. ISBN 978-3-801-25019-5.
- Hofmann, Ulrike Claudia (2000). Verräter verfallen der Feme! Fememorde in Bayern in den zwanziger Jahren. Köln: Böhlau Verlag. ISBN 978-3-412-15299-4.
- Jablonsky, David (1989). The Nazi Party in Dissolution. Frank Cass and Company, Ltd. ISBN 0-71463-322-4.
- Jones, Nigel (2021). Hitler's Heralds: The Story of the Freikorps 1918–1923. Lume Books. ISBN 979-8-707-99187-5.
- King, David (2017). The Trial of Adolf Hitler The Beer Hall Putsch and the Rise of Nazi Germany. London: Macmillan. ISBN 978-1-447-25111-8.
- Möller, Horst (2004). Die Weimarer Republik. Eine unvollendete Demokratie. Munich: dtv Verlagsgesellschaft. ISBN 978-0-691-05189-5.
- Schröm, Oliver; Röpke, Andrea (2006). Stille Hilfe für braune Kameraden: Das geheime Netzwerk der Alt- und Neonazis [Silent Aid for "Brown Comrades": The Secret Network of Old and Neo-Nazis]. Aufbau-Taschenbuch-Verlag. ISBN 978-3-746-67054-6.
- Schuster, Peter, ed. (1996). Für das stolze Edelweiss: Bildband zur Geschichte des Freikorps- und Bund Oberland [For the Proud Edelweiss: A Pictorial History of the Freikorps and Bund Oberland]. Munich: Brienna Verlag. ISBN 978-3-980-38751-4.
- Siemens, Daniel (2017). Stormtroopers: A New History of Hitler's Brownshirts. New Haven: Yale University Press. ISBN 978-0-300-19681-8.
- Zentner, Christian; Bedürftig, Friedemann, eds. (1997) [1991]. The Encyclopedia of the Third Reich. New York: Da Capo Press. ISBN 978-0-306-80793-0.
