= Richard Arauner =

Oberführer in the Schutzstaffel (SS)

- Born: 19 April 1902; Solnhofen, German Empire
- Died: 1 November 1936 (aged 34); Tabarz, Nazi Germany
- Military career
- Allegiance: Nazi Germany
- Branch: Schutzstaffel
- Rank: SS-Oberführer

Richard Arauner (19 April 1902 – 1 November 1936) was an Oberführer in the Schutzstaffel (SS) and agricultural functionary.

Richard Arauner was born into an Evangelical quarry owner family and completed his farmer-diploma. In 1923 he joined the Freikorps Oberland and participated in the Beer Hall Putsch in Munich. On 1 May 1933 Arauner became a member of the Nazi Party and on 1 October 1933, he joined the SS. Since 1931, Arauner was Chief of the Office of Agricultural Policy. Furthermore, he was a member of the German Reich Farm Council. Since his entry into the SS, he became officer in the SS Race and Settlement Main Office (RuSHA). Arauner rose through the ranks, from Obersturmführer to finally Oberführer.

On 1 November 1936, Arauner died in a plane crash on the way back from the inauguration of the Farmers Council of Landesbauernschaft Saar-Pfalz. He was buried in Goslar.
