= Hermann Höfle (SS general) =

German military officer and SS & police official (1898–1947)

Personal details
- Born: 12 September 1898 Augsburg, Kingdom of Bavaria, German Empire
- Died: 9 December 1947 (aged 49) Bratislava, Czechoslovakia
- Cause of death: Executed by hanging
- Resting place: St. Martin's Cemetery, Bratislava
- Party: Nazi Party
- Civilian awards: Blood Order

Military service
- Allegiance: German Empire; Weimar Republic; Nazi Germany
- Branch/service: Royal Bavarian Army; Freikorps; Reichswehr; Condor Legion; Waffen-SS
- Years of service: 1916–1934; 1937; 1944–1945
- Rank: Hauptmann; SS-Obergruppenführer und General der Waffen-SS und Polizei
- Unit: 8th Royal Bavarian Infantry Regiment; Aerial Reconnaissance Squadron 18; Reichswehr Infantry Regiment 19
- Commands: Higher SS and Police Leader (HSSPF) Mitte; HSSPF Slovakia
- Battles/wars: World War I Spanish Civil War; World War II
- Military awards: Clasp to the Iron Cross, 1st and 2nd class War Merit Cross, 1st and 2nd class with swords Spanish Cross, in bronze Bavarian Military Merit Order, 4th class with swords Wound Badge, in gold

Hermann Johann Matthäus Höfle (German: [ˈhɛʁman ˈhøːflə]; 12 September 1898 – 9 December 1947) was a German military officer and SS-Obergruppenführer during the Nazi era who served as a Higher SS and Police Leader (HSSPF) in Germany and in Slovakia. At the end of the Second World War, he was tried for war crimes, convicted and executed in Czechoslovakia.

== Early life and military service ==
Höfle was born in Augsburg, the son of a Bavarian postal inspector. He attended the local Volksschule and Gymnasium, graduating in January 1916. He volunteered for service in the Royal Bavarian Army on 30 September 1916 as a Fahnenjunker (officer cadet) with the 8th Royal Bavarian Infantry Regiment "Großherzog Friedrich II von Baden". He participated in the First World War, transferring to the Luftstreitkräfte in December 1916 and training as an aerial observer with Aerial Reconnaissance Squadron 18. He was wounded in aerial combat in June 1917, losing an arm. He returned to infantry service, was commissioned as a Leutnant in January 1918 and remained with his regiment until the end of the war in November 1918. For his war service, Höfle received the Iron Cross, 1st and 2nd class, the Bavarian Military Merit Order, 4th class with swords and the Wound Badge, in gold. He next served with the Freikorps von Epp, suppressing left-wing uprisings in Munich, Hamburg and the Ruhr.

In October 1920, Höfle entered the Reichswehr with Infantry Regiment 19 in Munich, and served for a time as an orderly officer to Hauptmann Ernst Röhm. In 1923, he joined the Bund Reichskriegsflagge, a paramilitary organization founded and led by Röhm. In November 1923, Höfle refused orders to fire on members of the Reichskriegsflagge who were to participate in Adolf Hitler's failed Beer Hall Putsch. For his actions, he later would be awarded the Blood Order when Hitler came to power. Höfle was promoted to Oberleutnant in April 1925, was married that year and had two daughters. In 1931, he qualified as a Spanish language interpreter and, from May 1932 to June 1933, he was attached to the Spanish government as a military attaché and translator. Advancing to the rank of Hauptmann in April 1933, he became an instructor of tactics at the war academy in Berlin in June 1933.

== Career in Nazi Germany ==
While still a serving officer, Höfle on 9 November 1933 officially joined the Sturmabteilung (SA), the Nazi paramilitary unit headed by SA-Stabschef Röhm. He was awarded the rank of SA-Standartenführer and was assigned to the staff of the Supreme SA Command where he served as a military advisor to Röhm. He remained Röhm's friend and confidant and tried to warn him of the impending actions against the SA by the SS with the support of the army that resulted in Röhm's murder during the Night of the Long Knives. Shortly afterward, Höfle left military service on 31 July 1934 with the rank of Hauptmann of reserves.

On 1 October 1934, Höfle also left the SA and transferred to the National Socialist Motor Corps (NSKK) as an NSKK-Standartenführer. Assigned to the Corps leadership office, he became the director of the NSKK Reichsführerschule (National Leadership School) in Munich and was promoted to NSKK-Oberführer (20 April 1935) and NSKK-Brigadeführer (30 January 1936). From January 1937, he served in Spain with the Condor Legion in support of the Nationalists in the Spanish Civil War. He served as an instructor with the temporary Spanish rank of Commandante (equivalent to Major) of reserves until returning to Germany in May 1937 due to illness.

At that time, Höfle officially joined the Nazi Party (membership number: 3,924,970). He was the commander of the NSKK brigade "Ostmark" from June to September 1937. On 6 September, 1937 he was promoted to NSKK-Gruppenführer and was named Inspector of NSKK Training. Höfle attained the rank of NSKK-Obergruppenführer on 30 January 1939. In September 1939, he took command of the NSKK Motorgruppe "Schlesien" and, in April 1941, of NSKK Motorobergruppe "Ost", comprising Motorguppen in Upper Silesia, Lower Silesia and Saxony. From 1939 until 1 July 1943, he was also the NSKK liaison officer to Governor General Hans Frank in occupied Poland, as well as to the Reich Interior Ministry and to the Amt Rosenberg. In August 1940, Höfle was also given a five-year appointment as an honorary judge on the People's Court. He also led the NSKK Verkehrskompanien (transport companies).

Höfle joined the Allgemeine SS on 1 July 1943 (SS number: 463,093) as an SS-Gruppenführer as a result of a request from Reichsführer-SS Heinrich Himmler and was assigned to his personal staff. From September 1943 to October 1944, he served as the Higher SS and Police Leader (HSSPF) "Mitte" in central Germany, with headquarters in Braunschweig. He was promoted to SS-Obergruppenführer and General of police on 20 April 1944, and General of the Waffen-SS on 1 July 1944. From late September 1944 to the end of the Second World War, he held the post of HSSPF in Slovakia. In this post, he played a leading role in the suppression of the Slovak National Uprising. In December 1944, Höfle led an anti-partisan operation in which troops under his command, the SS-Sturmbrigade Dirlewanger, committed numerous atrocities against the civilian population. Höfle then later deployed Dirlewanger's unit to defend several sectors in Ipolysag against the advancing 6th Tank Guard Army. During the war, he was awarded the Clasp to the Iron Cross, 1st and 2nd class and the War Merit Cross, 1st and 2nd class with swords.

== Post-war arrest, trial and execution ==
Höfle was arrested by American forces in Wildbad Kreuth in May 1945. He was held in internment camps in Frankfurt, Nuremberg and Dachau and was later extradited to Czechoslovakia. He was put on trial for war crimes along with SA-Obergruppenführer Hanns Ludin, the German ambassador to Slovakia. Both were sentenced to death and were hanged on 9 December 1947. Some sources claimed that Höfle died in custody on 3 December. However, his daughter, Helga Tiscenko, confirmed his execution on 9 December 1947 in her autobiography.

== Sources ==
- Klee, Ernst (2007). Das Personenlexikon zum Dritten Reich. Wer war was vor und nach 1945. Frankfurt-am-Main: Fischer-Taschenbuch-Verlag. ISBN 978-3-596-16048-8.
- Miller, Michael D.; Schulz, Andreas (2015). Leaders of the Storm Troops. Vol. 1. Solihull, England: Helion & Company. ISBN 978-1-909-98287-1.
- Williams, Max (2015). SS Elite: The Senior Leaders of Hitler's Praetorian Guard. Vol. 1. Fonthill Media LLC. ISBN 978-1-781-55433-3.
