= Otto Pittinger =

Bavarian medical officer, politician and soldier

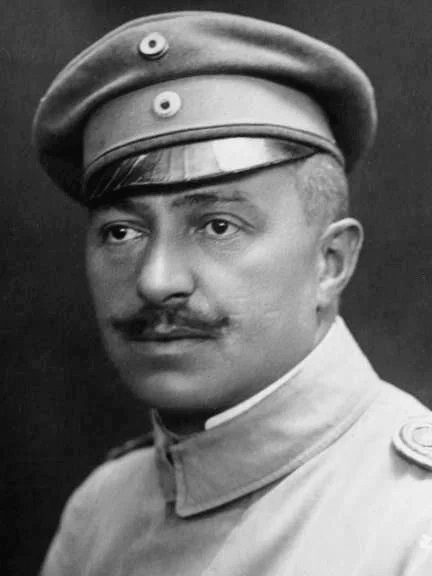
Otto Pittinger in World War I

Otto Pittinger (born 12 February 1878 in Wörth an der Donau; died August 1926 in Munich) was a Bavarian medical officer, politician and soldier. He was an influential leader in Bavarian politics during the early days of the Weimar Republic, and was leader of the Bund Bayern und Reich.

== Biography ==
Otto Pittinger was born in Wörth an der Donau, the son of a brewer. After leaving school, he studied medicine in Munich. During his studies, he became a member of the Corps Ratisbonia München, a fraternity of students and alumni.

=== Medical career ===
==== As a civilian doctor ====
Following his medical education, he settled as a general practitioner in Regensburg, also working as an occupational physician. He became involved in the care of infants, and was one of the first doctors involved in infant welfare within the German Empire. In 1906 he founded the first maternity care center in Regensburg. In 1907 he formed an association to combat child mortality. Serving as president, the association saw success, and soon expanded across most of Upper Palatinate in just three years. In 1910 Pittinger founded the children's hospital and milk kitchen in Regensburg; it was the first children's hospital in Bavaria.

==== As a medical officer ====
From the onset of the First World War, Pittinger served as a medical officer for the 6th Reserve Division. While facing trench warfare, his duties were three-fold: in charge of the health facilities for the reserve quarters and barracks; the creation of officers and convalescent home; a disinfecting and cleaning institution; the establishment of mineral water factories and baths; and all the quality and the health for the facilities serving the troops. While on the front lines, he took care of the wounded and their mental state. He was honored with the Iron Cross First Class.

At the end of 1917, the Bavarian Ministry of War entrusted him with the establishment of training and assistance for disabled veterans.

=== Political career ===
With the end of the war, he returned to Regensburg, where he became involved in the November Revolution. He was instrumental in the creation of the Bavarian Einwohnerwehr ("citizen's militia"), which served as civil defense units responsible for preventing looting and sabotage in rural areas. He was placed in charge of Einwohnerwehr management in the Regensburg region.

After the militias were disbanded in 1921, he created the Pittinger Organization, which later merged with the Bund Bayern und Reich ("League for Bavaria and the Reich") in 1922. It was a paramilitary group with close ties to the Reichswehr, and developed by mid-1922 into the largest of the patriotic organizations in Bavaria. Bund Bayern und Reich combined monarchism with Christian traditionalism, as well as vehement anti-Marxism and antisemitism. Their slogan was, "First the Homeland, then the World!"

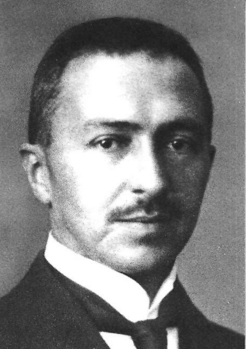
Otto Pittinger as leader of Bund Bayern und Reich

Much of Pittinger's popularity with the organization came from his promise to revise postwar settlements. Initially, he had been appointed by former leaders Escherich and Hermann Kriebel to rule under them, but, with patronage from Gustav von Kahr, soon became the true leader.

Pittinger soon became a prominent leader within separatist efforts in Bavaria. He initially attempted a coup in July 1922, but met opposition from factions in the Reichswehr who had been planning their own attack against Berlin. In the fall of that year, Pittinger spoke with several leaders within the conservative and nationalist parties about the possibility of establishing a regency. He hoped to gain the support of influential politicians such as von Kahr, Ernst Pöhner, and Franz Ritter von Epp. However, scandal broke out when it was disclosed that several members of the conspiracy had been funded by the French.

In August 1922, he met with Adolf Hitler, the recently appointed chairman of the NSDAP, to plan the overthrow of the Reich government in Bavaria. The two intended to coordinate a coup d'état of the Bavarian government in September, replacing it with a dictatorship under von Kahr. Kurt Lüdecke, acting as Hitler's messenger, traveled about northern Germany, preparing nationalists for the coup. However, when he went back to Munich to meet with Pittinger, Lüdecke encountered Pittinger leaving his home for a vacation in the Alps. (Pittinger had failed to gain support from certain sectors, and felt too afraid to continue.) Hitler was enraged that, after so much planning, everything had fizzled out, with only the National Socialists ready to march. Hitler told Lüdecke, "No more Pittingers, no more Fatherland societies! One party. One single party. These gentlemen, these counts and generals - they won't do anything. I shall. I alone."

The very next year, Hitler would attempt his own coup with the failed Beer Hall Putsch. Pittinger took part in the fight against the putsch by alerting units in Chiemgau, as well as the Bezirksamt ("district office"), of Hitler's actions.

In 1923, Pittinger accused Ernst Röhm, who had temporarily split from Hitler for opportunistic reasons, of misappropriating goods and funds. Röhm in turn accused Pittinger of cowardice and unpatriotic behavior, and broke from the League, taking his followers into the Reichskriegsflagge. Various other factions either left the League or became semi-autonomous. Despite this, the League continued to be one of the organizations with the largest memberships and most significant positions in Bavaria, with nearly 57,000 members.

Pittinger died during a return trip from the Adriatic Sea in August 1926, at just 48-years old, and was buried in Munich. He was succeeded as League chairman by retired general Otto von Stetten. The death of Pittinger, the weak leadership of von Stetten, and the drop in membership, eventually led to the slow decline of the League, until it was finally dissolved in 1935.

== Legacy ==
The municipality of Unterhaching later praised the medical work of Pittinger, and have even named both a town square and a street after him.

== Writings ==
- Über Zerreißung der Nabelschnur intra partum (1903)
- Der Zislerhof in Wildalpen, Steiermark (1914)
- Siedelungsfrage und Kriegerheimstätten (1919)
