= Historisches Lexikon Bayerns =

Online historical lexicon about Bavarian history

- Logo
- Website type: Online lexicon about the History of Bavaria
- Available in: German
- Owner: Referat Digitale Bibliothek of the Bavarian State Library
- Creator: authors tasked by the editorial team
- Website: www.historisches-lexikon-bayerns.de
- Registration: no
- Launched: May 2006

The Historische Lexikon Bayerns (abbr: HLB) or Historical Lexicon of Bavaria is a specialist, historical lexicon about the History of Bavaria, which has been published as a genuine online publication. It is the first specialised lexicon on the history of the Free State of Bavaria and its various regions.

== History and development ==
The concept of publishing an online encyclopedia on the history of Bavaria has been worked on since the late 1990s. Work on the HLB began in February 2005, the first articles of the module on the Weimar Republic were published in May 2006. By 2025 the HLB had grown to around 1,400 articles (as of March 2025), including modules on the Late Middle Ages since 2007, the post-1945 period since 2008, the Early Middle Ages since 2017, the Nazi era and the 19th century since 2018/2019. The aim of the HLB is to provide comprehensive coverage of all historical eras of Bavaria since prehistory.

The HLB was originally part of the Bavarian Regional Library Online (Bayerische Landesbibliothek Online, BLO), which had been in development since 2000. As an independent service, the HLB is linked to the Bavarian cultural portal bavarikon. In 2014/15, the HLB underwent a comprehensive technical and visual relaunch. Since then, it has been possible to search by epoch and category.

Approximately 50 articles have been translated into English since 2020.

== Management structure ==
The HLB is organised by the Bavarian State Library (Bayerische Staatsbibliothek, BSB), the Commission for Bavarian Regional History at the Bavarian Academy of Sciences (Kommission für bayerische Landesgeschichte bei der Bayerischen Akademie der Wissenschaften) and the Conference of Regional Historians at the Bavarian universities (Konferenz der Landeshistoriker an den bayerischen Universitäten). The Bavarian State Library is the base of the editorial team of the HBL. Until 2020, Stephan Kellner, head of the Bavarica department at the BSB, was project manager of the HLB. Florian Sepp succeeded him in 2021. Ferdinand Kramer, head of the Institute for Bavarian History at LMU Munich, is the academic director. The Munich Digitization Centre/Digital Library Department of the BSB provides technical support (Head: Martin Hermann).

The editorial team of the HLB currently (2024) consists of five employees, who are supported by several research assistants. To ensure the quality of the content of the articles, an academic advisory board consisting of 54 experts in Bavarian regional history is consulting the editorial team. These include professors from the chairs of regional history at Bavarian universities and members of the Commission for Bavarian History. The more than 800 authors of the articles to date are all recognised experts in their respective field.

The main financial sponsor is the Bavarian State Ministry of Science and the Arts.

== Target audience ==
The HLB is intended equally for academic specialists, pupils and students and the public with an interest in history.

== Layout ==
The structure of the articles in the HLB is based on conventional specialised encyclopaedias. They reflect the current state of research on the respective subject in a summarised form. In addition, short abstracts and further information in form of relevant secondary literature, sources, external links and media complement the articles. The HLB benefits from the constantly growing electronic resources of the Bavarian State Library and other institutions by providing direct links to digitised sources and titles. Across all article content, persons and locations are indexed by standard data. Readers have the opportunity to submit comments and suggestions to the authors of the articles via the editorial team.

== Literature ==
- Ellen Latzin: Bayerische Geschichte im Internet. Das Historische Lexikon Bayerns. Zeitschrift für bayerische Landesgeschichte 69 (2006): 993–1004.
- Florian Sepp: Das Historische Lexikon Bayerns: ein Internet-Lexikon zur bayerischen Geschichte. Jahrbuch der historischen Forschung in der Bundesrepublik Deutschland 2006 (2007): 109–114.
- Florian Sepp: Das Historische Lexikon Bayerns. Akademie aktuell / Bayerische Akademie der Wissenschaften, 2007: 14–17.
- Florian Sepp: Das Spätmittelalter im World Wide Web; 800 Artikel im Historischen Lexikon Bayerns behandeln die spätmittelalterliche Geschichte Altbayerns, Frankens, Schwabens und der Pfalz. Akademie aktuell / Bayerische Akademie der Wissenschaften, 2010: 26–27.
- Matthias Bader: Das Historische Lexikon Bayerns. Mit dem Lexikon entsteht erstmals ein umfassendes online-Nachschlagewerk zur bayerischen Geschichte. Bibliotheksforum Bayern 7 (2013): 15.
- Bernhard Graf von Zech-Kleber: Das Historische Lexikon Bayerns. Ein Nachschlagewerk für die Landesgeschichte in (Main-)Franken. Mainfränkisches Jahrbuch für Geschichte und Kunst 72 (2020): 337–351.
- Irmtraut Heitmeier, Daniel Rittenauer, Stefan Schnupp: 15 Jahre Historisches Lexikon Bayern. Eine Erfolgsgeschichte. Bibliotheksforum Bayern 16(1) (2022): 24–27.
