= Kurt Lüdecke =

German nationalist and early Nazi

Kurt Lüdecke (5 February 1890 – 1960) was an ardent German nationalist and international traveler who joined the Nazi Party in the early 1920s and who used his social connections to raise money for the NSDAP. Before attending a rally at which Adolf Hitler was a featured speaker, Lüdecke had assumed that Hitler was simply "one more fanatic" but after hearing Hitler speak at a mass demonstration at the Königsplatz in Munich, he adopted Hitler as his hero: "His appeal to German manhood was like a call to arms, the gospel he preached a sacred truth." The next day, he spoke to Hitler for four hours and offered himself to Hitler and the Nazi cause "without reservation ... I had given him my soul."

== Career ==
Lüdecke was born in Berlin, Germany.

In the wake of the uproar over the Law for the Protection of the Republic, after the assassination of Walther Rathenau in 1922, an unrealistic plan for a coup d'état in Munich was hatched by civil servant Dr. Otto Pittinger. Nationalist organizations, including the Nazis, would overthrow the Bavarian government via a putsch and replace it with a dictatorship under Gustav Ritter von Kahr, the former minister president of Bavaria. Lüdecke's mission was to help coordinate support of the Northern German National Socialist revolutionaries in preparation for spreading the putsch throughout Germany.

In 1924, Lüdecke visited the U.S. in an effort to garner support and funds for the Nazis.

Upon his return to Bavaria, Lüdecke found that Pittinger was going on vacation instead of running a coup and that Hitler was furious, announcing to Lüdecke that he would never again rely on others for help in a coup.

Lüdecke offered his services to Hitler as an envoy to Benito Mussolini soon after the Italian dictator marched on Rome and rose to power in Italy. His attempts to raise money from Mussolini were not productive. But Lüdecke persuaded Mussolini to send Leo Negrelli to Munich to interview Hitler on October 16, 1923, for the Corriere Italiano, providing visibility for the Nazis in Italy.

Lüdecke also visited Henry Ford in Michigan to see if Ford, a wealthy industrialist, would contribute funds to the struggling Nazi Party. Lüdecke's introduction was provided by the composer Siegfried and his wife Winifred Wagner, who were Hitler supporters. However, Ford declined to contribute.

Possibly due to his association with Ernst Röhm, Hitler became suspicious of him, as of many others in the early S.A., imprisoned him and apparently had him marked for death during The Night of the Long Knives. However Lüdecke escaped to Czechoslovakia and then to North America, where he landed on the day many of his former associates were assassinated.

Soon after his arrival, in September 1934, Lüdecke appeared before the House Un-American Activities Committee. In 1935, he founded the Swastika League of America (also known as the Swastika Press), a breakaway group of the Free Society of Teutonia.

On December 8, 1941, under Proclamation 2526, Lüdecke was arrested by the FBI and interned on Ellis Island.

In 1946, he was ordered to be deported back to Germany. In 1947, Ludecke petitioned for a writ of habeas corpus to order his release. The Supreme Court ruled 5–4 to release Ludecke but also found that the Alien Enemies Act allowed for detainment beyond the time hostilities ceased until an actual treaty was signed with the hostile nation or government. Ultimately, he was deported to Germany on June 22, 1948. He settled in Bavaria as his home in Berlin was under Soviet control. He died in Prien am Chiemsee.

=== I Knew Hitler ===
Lüdecke's chief work is his book I Knew Hitler, an early study of the German Führer originally published by Scribners in 1937. The 833-page book, subtitled The Story of a Nazi Who Escaped the Blood-Purge, was reissued by Pen and Sword in 2013. Credit for assistance in writing and editing the book has been given to Paul Mooney (1904–1939), who had also served as secretary and literary assistant to travel writer Richard Halliburton.

An account of the collaboration between Lüdecke and Mooney is in 2007's Horizon Chasers—The Lives and Adventures of Richard Halliburton and Paul Mooney by Gerry Max.
