= Bayernwacht =

- Founder: Fritz Schäffer
- Leader: Hans Ritter von Lex (1932-1933)
- Founded: 22 February 1924; 102 years ago
- Dates active: 1924-1933
- Dissolved: 1933
- Country: Germany
- Allegiance: Bavarian People's Party
- Newspaper: Bayernwacht (January 1932- February 1933)
- Active regions: Bavaria
- Ideology: Bavarian nationalism Anti-fascism; Anti-communism
- Political position: Center-right
- Size: 30,000

The Bayernwacht (English: Bavarian Guard) was the paramilitary group of the Bavarian People's Party. It was initially founded in 1924 by Fritz Schäffer to defend the BVP's meetings from attacks by enemy paramilitaries, but expanded into a full paramilitary organization itself. The Bayerwacht were enemies of the Nazis and resisted their takeover, but after the collapse of the Weimar Republic the group was dissolved in April 1933.

== History ==
During the campaigns for the 1924 Bavarian and Reichstag elections the BVP was subjected to paramilitary violence from the paramilitaries of other parties such as the Reichsbanner and the Sturmabteilung. As a result of this BVP politician Fritz Schäffer decided that the BVP needed it own security force and created an organized "security force" in summer and fall of 1924. This security force would evolve into the Bayernwacht by 1925, centered around the city of Munich. Membership in this new Bayernwacht was open to all Bavarians aged 17 or older and who had "Christian" and "loyal German" convictions. The group proved to be highly effective, with the Nazi newspaper Völkischer Beobachter complained the party [immediately seized] anyone (...) who dared to express their displeasure with this or that statement by the Prime Minister".

Initially the Bayernwacht had remained a limited organization but following a breakdown in relations between the BVP and the Bavarian Home Guard, on whom the BVP had heavily depended on for paramilitary matters, the Bayernwacht began to expand. Beyond the initial core group in Munich it began to expand into Upper Bavaria, Lower Bavaria, and Lower Franconia, with a more limited presence in the Upper Palatinate and Swabia. The group also established a magazine, titled Bayernwacht which was published quarterly from January 1932 until February 1933.

The Bayernwacht was organized on several different levels: The state organization was divided into regional organization which were further divided into district organizations. These organization were divided by age into a junior division (aged 17-30) and an alumni division (aged 30+).

The first big test for this new expanded Bayernwacht were the 1932 Bavarian Landtag Elections and the 1932 German presidential election, where it proved vital in protecting BVP events from SA attacks. In June 1932, following the lifting of the ban on the SA by the government of Franz von Papen BVP made the decision to dramatically expand the Bayernwacht again. An leadership independent t of the BVP was established, led by BVP politician Hans Ritter von Lex,and membership expanded to 30,000. The group also received an influx of funding from a variety of sources, including Jewish Central Association and the Catholic clergy. Though despite the urgency of the Nazi threat the Bayernwacht never entered into any sort of formal co-operation agreement with any other paramilitary groups in Bavaria itself, though there was some limited co-operation with the Reichsbanner in the Palatinate. Despite all the build up the Bayernwacht was still no match for the SA.

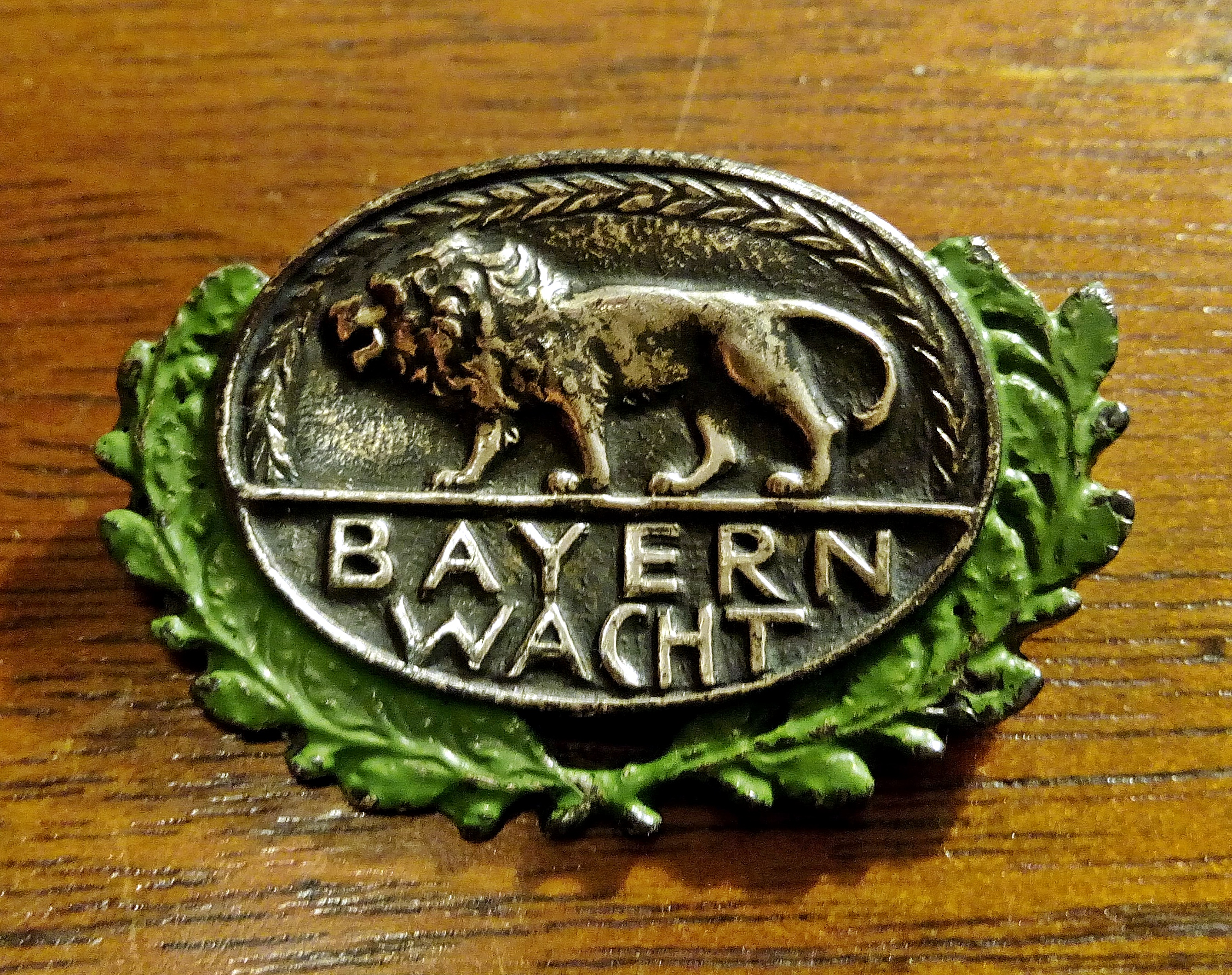
A Bayernwacht Badge from ~1930

Going into 1933 violence between the Bayernwacht and Nazi groups only increased. In the run up to the March 1933 German election the BVP feared a putsch by the SA, Schäffer threatened an "open fight" between the Bayernwacht and Nazis if the SA attempted such, and the Bayernwacht prepared to defend Bavaria in such a scenario. After the Nazi's rise to power the leadership of the Bayernwacht was seemingly aware of the hopelessness of their situation in the face of the Nazi's control of the Reichswehr and their infiltration of Bavarian government institutions. On March 10-11 their leaders were arrested, on the 13th Hans Ritter von Lex forbade violent resistance against the Nazi, and on April 13th he declared the group dissolved.

== Ideology ==
The group has been classified as a moderate bourgeois organization politically. The group opposed both Communism and Nazism and its self declared enemies were "all enemies of the independence of our beloved Bavarian homeland!". The groups motto was ""Kernbayerisch und treudeutsch!".
