= Wehrverband Reichsflagge =

Former German paramilitary unit

- Flag of the German Empire (1871–1918)
- Active: 11 October 1920 – 1 December 1927
- Country: Germany
- Allegiance: Arbeitsgemeinschaft der Vaterländischen Kampfverbände; Deutscher Kampfbund
- Type: Paramilitary
- Size: 4,000–20,000
- Headquarters: Nuremberg

Commanders
- Commander: Adolf Heiß

The Wehrverband Reichsflagge (English: Imperial Flag Defense Association) – or Bund Reichsflagge (Imperial Flag League) – was a German paramilitary organization founded in 1920 by Adolf Heiß. It joined together with other right-wing militant entities to form the Arbeitsgemeinschaft der Vaterländischen Kampfverbände (Working Group of Patriotic Combat Leagues) in February 1923. The Wehrverband Reichsflagge next joined the Deutscher Kampfbund (German Combat League), which was formed in September 1923, but it broke with Adolf Hitler and the more radical members of this umbrella group in October, and did not participate in the failed Beer Hall Putsch of November 1923. Over the next few years, the group experienced a decline in membership and finally merged into Der Stahlhelm, the large German veterans' organization, in December 1927.

== Origins, leadership and ideology ==
The Wehrverband Reichsflagge had its origins in the summer of 1919 during the first year of the Weimar Republic, when Adolf Heiß, an active-duty Hauptmann in the Reichswehr, formed the eponymous "Heiß Home Guard Battalion" (Heimatschutzbataillon Heiß) at his garrison duty station in Nuremberg. The battalion was deployed on 17 March 1920 against workers in Nuremberg that were demonstrating against the Kapp Putsch, a failed right-wing attempt to overthrow the republic. Later that year, Heiß sought to establish a permanent paramilitary organization. On 11 October 1920, he formally registered the Wehrverband Reichsflagge in Nuremberg's registry of associations. The organization's platform was Völkisch, anti-republican and monarchist, advocating a restoration of the Hohenzollern Empire. As such, it enjoyed the support of many conservative wealthy industrialists and business owners, as well as much of the middle class. Its emblem was an armored fist reaching toward the German imperial flag.

Among the various paramilitary units operating in Bavaria during the Weimar era, the Wehrverband Reichsflagge occupied a unique position as the only such organization to have its regional stronghold in Franconia. Headquartered in Nuremberg, the organization proceeded to establish numerous local chapters, primarily across the Protestant regions of Middle and Upper Franconia, where it soon emerged as the dominant local paramilitary unit, boasting a total membership of approximately 4,000. Over the next three years, Heiß concentrated on enlarging the organization, and his friend and colleague Hauptmann Ernst Röhm played an instrumental role in the organization's expansion southward, taking charge of the Munich branch in 1921. At its peak, the Reichsflagge boasted a membership of around 20,000.

== Events in the pivotal year of 1923 ==
On 4 February 1923, Heiß approved the Reichsflagge joining the Arbeitsgemeinschaft der Vaterländischen Kampfverbände (Working Group of Patriotic Combat Leagues), a new coalition founded by Röhm that sought to serve as an umbrella organization for militant forces opposed to the Weimar government. It was a loose amalgamation of independent groups with no single leader, and decisions were made by consultations among the individual leaders. Apart from the Reichsflagge, the major components were Adolf Hitler's Sturmabteilung (SA) and the Bund Oberland, led by Friedrich Weber. Smaller components included the Vaterländische Vereine München (VVM), the Kreis Niederbayern, the Bund Unterland and the Organisation Lenz. The organization's military commander was Hermann Kriebel. Hitler's proposed plans for a massive protest on May Day with physical assaults on left-wing groups led to internal dissension, with the VVM and the Organization Lenz voting not to participate. Ultimately the action was foiled by firm government, military and police opposition. This resulted in a severe setback and fractures in the coalition that led to some member groups leaving.

The next key event occurred at the Deutscher Tag (German Day) rally in Nuremberg on 1–2 September 1923, when a renewed coalition named the Deutscher Kampfbund was formed, replacing the Arbeitsgemeinschaft, and consisting of the Reichsflagge, the SA and the Bund Oberland. This was designed as a tighter and more disciplined entity. On 25 September, it placed itself under the political leadership of Hitler, who began actively anticipating more radical measures, with preparations being made for a putsch against the government. This sparked opposition within Nuremberg's bourgeois circles, which on 1 October issued an ultimatum to Heiß, demanding that he abandon the alliance with the radicals. Heiß complied and withdrew his organization from the Kampfbund on 7 October. However, four southern Bavarian chapters, under the leadership of Röhm, refused to leave the Kampfbund and were removed from the Reichsflagge. On 11 October, Röhm reconstituted this minority group as the Bund Reichskriegsflagge (Imperial War Flag League). Therefore, Heiß and his Wehrverband Reichsflagge took no part in the Beer Hall Putsch of 8–9 November 1923, led by Hitler, Röhm and Erich Ludendorff. Consequently, when the putsch leaders were arrested and the Kampfbund components were banned by the Bavarian government in the aftermath of the aborted coup, Heiß and the Reichsflagge were not adversely affected

== Decline and dissolution ==
The Wehrverband Reichsflagge adhered to a more moderate political position and avoided more radical moves that could result in it being outlawed. It suffered further defections in late November 1923, when another group of Völkisch activists broke away, forming a splinter group under the name Altreichsflagge (Old Imperial Flag). The leader of this group, which was essentially confined to the Franconia region, was Willy Liebel, who would later serve as the Nazi Oberbürgermeister of Nuremberg during Nazi Germany. Over the next few years, much like all the other paramilitary organizations, the Reichsflagge increasingly lost membership, momentum and financial support as the general political situation in the Weimar Republic stabilized.

Consequently, Heiß initiated merger negotiations with Der Stahlhelm, the much larger and comparatively moderate German veterans' association. On 1 December 1927, he formally incorporated the Reichsflagge into Der Stahlhelm, though preserving its existing organizational structures. Der Stahlhelm eventually forged an alliance with the Nazi Party after the Nazi seizure of power, but it was dissolved in November 1935. Heiß's old comrades from the Kampfbund never forgave him for his defection in November 1923 and, as a result, he played no further political role during the Nazi era.

== Sources ==
- Gordon, Harold J. (1972). Hitler and the Beer Hall Putsch. Princeton, N.J.: Princeton University Press. ISBN 978-0-691-05189-5.
- Hübner, Christoph (11 May 2006): Reichsflagge, 1919-1927 in Historisches Lexikon Bayerns.
- Jablonsky, David (1989). The Nazi Party in Dissolution. London: Frank Cass and Company, Ltd. ISBN 0-71463-322-4.
- Kershaw, Ian (2008). Hitler: A Biography. New York: W.W. Norton & Co. ISBN 978-0-393-33761-7.
