= Hans Ritter von Lex =

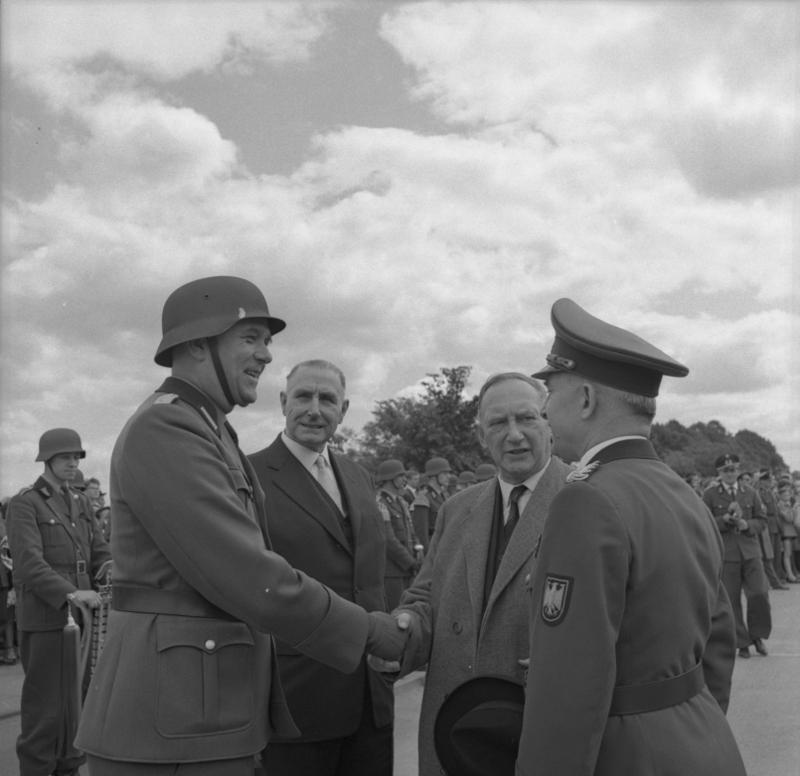
Hans Ritter von Lex

Hans Ritter von Lex (1893-1970) was a German political figure and the President of the German Red Cross (German: Deutsches Rotes Kreuz) from 1961 to 1967. He was born Hans Lex on October 27, 1893, in Rosenheim, Upper Bavaria, Germany. He died February 26, 1970, in Munich, Germany.

== Biography ==
After graduation from a Gymnasium in 1912, Lex began the study of law at the Ludwig-Maximilians-Universität München. In 1914, shortly after taking his first state exam, his studies were interrupted by the outbreak of World War I. Lex volunteered to serve in the Bavarian Army and served with the Infantry Life Regiment, Bavaria's elite bodyguard regiment. He was commissioned a reserve lieutenant in March 1915, and in September 1915 he went to the Bavarian 18th Reserve Infantry Regiment. For his bravery on July 31, 1916, during the Battle of the Somme, Lex was decorated with the Military Order of Max Joseph, Bavaria's highest bravery decoration. The order conferred a patent of nobility, and the title "Ritter von" was added to Lex's name. Lex returned to the Infantry Life Regiment in late 1916 as a company commander, but in 1918 he was transferred to an office in the Bavarian War Ministry after his three brothers were killed in action.

After the war, Ritter von Lex resumed his legal studies, and upon completion of the second state exam, he became a lawyer in the Bavarian state government. He was a civil servant in the Bavarian Culture Ministry from 1921 to 1923 and from 1927 to 1932, with an interlude from 1923 to 1927 as a district attorney in his hometown of Rosenheim. From 1932 to 1933, he was a member of the Reichstag, the parliament of the Weimar Republic, for the Bavarian People's Party. His party negotiated with the Nazi Party over power-sharing in a coalition government, but after Adolf Hitler took power, he and the other leaders of the Bavarian People's Party were briefly imprisoned. After his release, Ritter von Lex became a civil servant in the Reich Ministry of the Interior, responsible for sports affairs. He helped plan the 1936 Winter and Summer Olympics which took place in Germany.

After World War II, in 1946, Ritter von Lex became a senior civil servant in the Bavarian Interior Ministry. In October 1949 he became a state secretary in the West German Federal Ministry of the Interior. He retired from government service in October 1960.

Hans Ritter von Lex was elected President of the German Red Cross in 1961. He served as president until 1967, after which he became an honorary president until his death in 1970.

== Honors ==
- Grand Cross of Merit with Star and Sash of the Federal Republic of Germany (1955)
- Bavarian Order of Merit
- Honorary Knight Commander of the Order of the British Empire (1961)
- Knight's Cross of the Military Order of Max Joseph (1916, conferred 1920)
- Grand Cross of the Order of St. Gregory the Great (Vatican)
- Iron Cross, 1st and 2nd Class
- Honorary citizen of Rosenheim

After his death, the German border guard (Grenzschutz) renamed its barracks in Rosenheim the "Grenzschutzunterkunft Hans Ritter von Lex"
