= Citizens' Defense =

Paramilitary in Weimar Germany

Einwohnerwehr
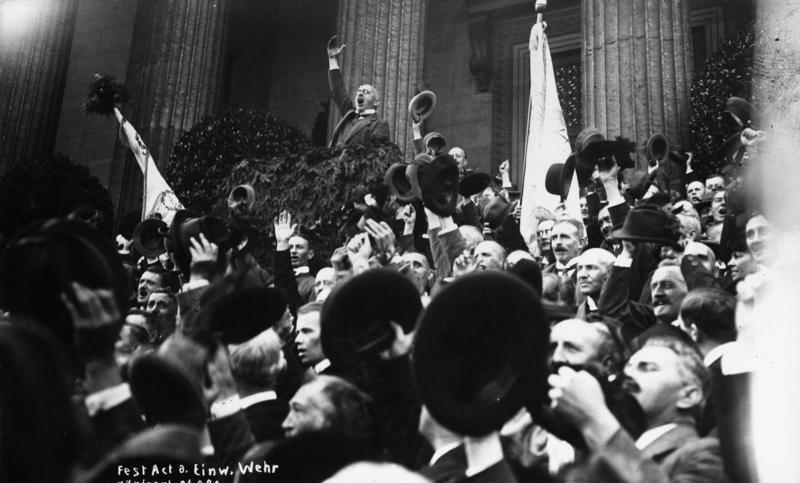
- Founded: German Revolution of 1918-19
- Disbanded: 29 June 1921
- Country: Germany
- Type: Paramilitary

Commanders
- Notable commanders: Ernst Röhm

The Einwohnerwehr, or "Citizens' Defense," also called the Civil Guard or Civil Defense, was a far-right paramilitary in Weimar Germany that existed in violation of the Treaty of Versailles from the German Revolution of 1918-19 until 29 June 1921. It was established with the goal of defending Germany against Communist uprisings and foreign attacks, though it was also hostile to the Weimar Republic. It was based in Bavaria, where anti-Berlin and anti-republican sentiment attracted such activity. On 29 June 1921 the German government gave in to Allied demands and dissolved the Citizens' Defense. Its militants moved on to fight in other far-right paramilitaries with similar goals.

== Activity in Germany ==
Units of the Citizens' Defense had existed throughout Germany since the revolution as a modification of the reactionary Freikorps militia with the purpose of quickly reinforcing cities against revolutionary forces by recruiting small groups of civilians. Its stronghold was its unit in Munich, Bavaria, led by Major Doctor Forstrat Escherich. This is in part because Bavarian nationalism and anti-republicanism flourished as many of its politicians, Army officers, and commoners desired a restoration of the House of Wittelsbach monarchy in defiance of Berlin. For example, a 1919 order from the Bavarian Department of the Interior stated that the attitude of the Bavarian administration towards the Citizens' Defense should be that of "advisers and supporters." In addition, Bavarian Minister-President Gustav von Kahr protected the Citizens' Defense by telling the British ambassador that there was "no militarism in the idea".SA commander and close Hitler ally Ernst Röhm was a notable commander in the Bavarian Citizens' Defense.

Due to its success in Bavaria, the units of the Citizens' Defense were organized in May 1920 by Bavarian Citizens' Defense leader Georg Escherich into a unified national force called the "Orgesch," or Organisation Escherich. The Citizens' Defense was supported and supplied by the government, the Reichswehr, and the Freikorps. The Weimar regime became worried that its defense was being entrusted to the far right, and in September 1919 issued a call to its supporters to join the Citizens' Defense. This was not successful and the regime did not pursue the issue. After the failed Kapp Putsch of 1920, the Citizens' Defense was ordered dissolved, but Bavaria refused, keeping its unit in existence for another year. In October 1920, to partially appease Allied demands, the Citizens' Defense surrendered one-third to half of their rifles.

== On the European Stage ==
Though the Citizens' Defense was involved in internal struggle, it soon became entangled in foreign conflict. Indeed, many of its leaders saw its primary purpose as providing defense for Germany's frontiers. In March of 1921, the Allies, citing the Treaty of Versailles, demanded the dissolution of the illegal paramilitary and occupied two German cities along the Rhine. But Germany did not disband it. That same month, German Communists attempted a short-lived revolt. And in May, Germany sent the Citizens' Defense to help crush a Polish uprising in the important coal province of Upper Silesia. (The fighting had been brought about by the controversy over the results of the plebiscite that had been held there to determine whether Upper Silesia would be controlled by Germany or Poland.)

== Dissolution ==
All these conflicts may have given the Berlin government justification for the Citizens' Defense. But Germany was hoping to negotiate a more lenient peace deal with the Allies and did not believe resistance to France and Britain would be successful anyway. The German government was replaced in May. The new government was determined to cooperate with the Allies, in the hopes that this would help them achieve a better peace. So on 29 June 1921 Germany officially dissolved the Citizens' Defense, and the Bavarian government, beginning to fear the goals of the paramilitary, allowed it, although Gustav von Kahr soon resigned as Bavarian Minister-President. Disbanded Citizens' Defense militants went on to join other far-right paramilitaries, like the Bund Bayern und Reich ("League for Bavaria and Empire"), the chief successor organization of the Citizens' Defense.
