= Bund Reichskriegsflagge =

German Paramilitary unit

- Imperial War Flag of the German Empire
- Active: October–November 1923; 1925
- Country: Germany
- Allegiance: Deutscher Kampfbund
- Type: Paramilitary
- Size: c. 500
- Headquarters: Munich
- Engagements: Beer Hall Putsch

Commanders
- Commanders: Ernst Röhm; Joseph Seydel

The Bund Reichskriegsflagge (Imperial War Flag League) or the Verband Reichskriegsflagge (Imperial War Flag Association) was a paramilitary organization founded by Ernst Röhm in 1923. It participated in Adolf Hitler's failed attempt to seize power in Munich on 8–9 November 1923, in what became known as the Beer Hall Putsch. It along with the Nazi Party was banned as a result.

== History and leadership ==
On 11 October 1923, Ernst Röhm formed the Bund Reichskriegsflagge from four local groups (Memmingen, Schleißheim, Augsburg and Munich) of the Wehrverband Reichsflagge (Imperial Flag Defense Association), which had been expelled for insubordination. Of the approximately 500 members, a large number were young activists, and many were students. Röhm appointed a loyal colleague, Joseph Seydel, as the nominal leader (Bundesführer) but he retained de facto control. It became part of the Deutscher Kampfbund (German Combat League) that had been formed on 2 September 1923, and which had placed itself under the political leadership of Adolf Hitler on 25 September.

The Bund Reichskriegsflagge under Röhm was instrumental in the Beer Hall Putsch – the unsuccessful attempt by Hitler and the Nazi Party (NSDAP) to seize power in Munich on 8–9 November 1923. Both the Bund and the NSDAP were banned in the immediate aftermath of the putsch. The Bund Reichskriegsflagge was briefly resurrected in 1925 after the ban was lifted, then merged with the Tannenbergbund.

== Other notable members ==
- Otto Herzog
- Gebhard Ludwig Himmler
- Heinrich Himmler
- Hermann Höfle
- Adolf Hühnlein
- Emil Ketterer
- Fritz Ritter von Kraußer
- Wilhelm Schmid
- Wilhelm Weiss

== Sources ==
- Harold J. Gordon: Hitlerputsch 1923. Machtkampf in Bayern 1923–1924. Bernard & Graefe, Frankfurt am Main 1971, ISBN 3-7637-5108-4.
- Jablonsky, David (1989). The Nazi Party in Dissolution. London: Frank Cass and Company, Ltd. ISBN 0-71463-322-4.
- Werner Maser: Die Frühgeschichte der NSDAP. Hitlers Weg bis 1924. Athenäum-Verlag, Frankfurt am Main u. a. 1965.
- Ernst Röhm: Die Geschichte eines Hochverräters. Eher, München 1928 (Nachdruck der 6. Auflage, Eher, München 1934: Faksimile-Verlag, Bremen 1982 (Historische Faksimiles)).
