= Gregor Strasser =

German politician (1892–1934)

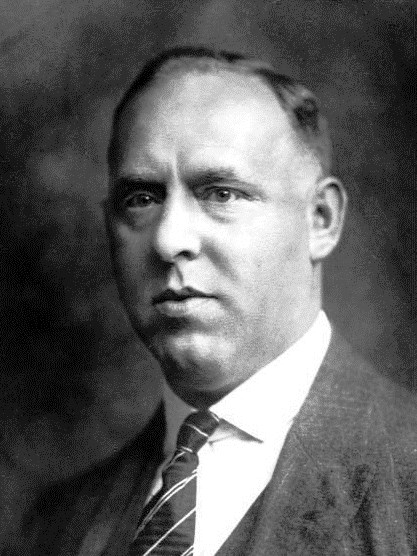
- Strasser, c. 1928

Organisationsabteilung Leiter, later Reichsorganisationsleiter NSDAP
- In office 2 January 1928 – 8 December 1932
- Preceded by: General Bruno Heinemann
- Succeeded by: Adolf Hitler; Robert Ley

Reichspropagandaleiter NSDAP
- In office 16 September 1926 – 2 January 1928
- Preceded by: Otto May
- Succeeded by: Adolf Hitler

Gauleiter of Lower Bavaria; Lower Bavaria-Upper Palatinate; Lower Bavaria
- In office 26 February 1925 – 1 November 1929
- Preceded by: Position established
- Succeeded by: Otto Erbersdobler (Lower Bavaria); Adolf Wagner (Upper Palatinate)

Member of the Reichstag
- In office 7 December 1924 – March 1933
- Constituency: Upper Bavaria

Member of the Landtag of Bavaria
- In office 4 May 1924 – 7 December 1924
- Constituency: Pfaffenhofen

Personal details
- Born: 31 May 1892 Geisenfeld, Bavaria, German Empire
- Died: 30 June 1934 (aged 42) Berlin, Nazi Germany
- Cause of death: Execution by shooting
- Party: NSDAP (1922–1923; 1925–1932)
- Other political affiliations: VSB (1924); NSFB (1924–1925)
- Relatives: Otto Strasser (brother); Bernhard Strasser (brother)
- Education: Ludwig-Maximilians-Universität München; University of Erlangen
- Profession: Pharmacist

Military service
- Allegiance: German Empire; Weimar Republic
- Branch/service: Bavarian Army
- Years of service: 1914–1919
- Rank: Oberleutnant
- Unit: 1st Bavarian Field Artillery Regiment; Freikorps Epp
- Battles/wars: World War I German Revolution
- Awards: Iron Cross

Gregor Strasser (German: Gregor Straßer; 31 May 1892 – 30 June 1934) was a German politician and early leader of the Nazi Party. Along with his younger brother Otto, he was a leading member of the party's northern group, which brought them into conflict with the dominant faction led by Adolf Hitler. Gregor's willingness to engage in political negotiations with Chancellor Kurt von Schleicher in 1932 ultimately led to his resignation and murder in the Night of the Long Knives in 1934. The brothers' strand of the Nazi ideology is later known as Strasserism, a political concept largely popularized by Otto after he left the party in 1930.

Born in Bavaria, Strasser served in an Imperial German Army artillery regiment during World War I, rising to the rank of first lieutenant and winning the Iron Cross of both classes for bravery. After the war, he and his brother became members of Franz Ritter von Epp's Freikorps. He joined the Nazi Party (NSDAP) in 1920 and quickly became an influential and important figure in the fledgling party. In 1923, Strasser took part in the abortive Beer Hall Putsch in Munich and was imprisoned. After securing an early release following his election to the Reichstag, he joined a revived NSDAP in 1925 and once again established himself as a powerful and dominant member. A highly skilled organiser and effective public speaker, Strasser oversaw a major increase in the party's membership and reputation in northern Germany, transforming the NSDAP from a marginal southern party to a nationwide political force. By mid-1932, Strasser was in charge of the party's national organizational work.

The Strasser brothers jointly drafted the "Strasser Program" for 1925–1926, which included some radical proposals, mainly developed by Otto, such as reorganizing large agricultural estates into "hereditary fiefs" (Erblehen). This program had led Hitler to repudiate Gregor at the 1926 Bamberg Conference. The two later reconciled, with Strasser acknowledging that Hitler had assumed the role of ideological leader for the movement while he himself continued as organizer. In 1932, he introduced the party's "Emergency Economic Program" (Wirtschaftliches Sofortprogramm), a program advocating for state-funded work creation. In December 1932, his relationship with Hitler became permanently fractured when Chancellor Kurt von Schleicher offered him the post of Vice-Chancellor. Accused of attempting to split the party, he subsequently resigned from all party offices. Strasser then renounced his Reichstag seat and retired from active politics to serve as a director at the Schering-Kahlbaum pharmaceutical company. On 30 June 1934, in a purge that became known as the Night of the Long Knives, Strasser was arrested by the Gestapo and subsequently executed.

Historian Hans Mommsen has commented that Otto Strasser was "in most respects" the intellectual superior of his brother Gregor. Peter Stachura views Gregor as a realpolitisch opportunist, and that his reputation as a principled "revolutionary" is a myth exaggerated and often fabricated by his brother Otto.

== Early life ==
Gregor Strasser was born on 31 May 1892 into the family of a Catholic judicial officer who lived in the Upper Bavarian market town of Geisenfeld. He grew up alongside his younger brother Otto, who was considered the more intellectual of the two. He attended the local Gymnasium and after his final examinations, served an apprenticeship as a pharmacist in the Lower Bavarian village of Frontenhausen from 1910 until 1914.

=== World War I ===
When war broke out in Europe in 1914, Strasser suspended his studies at the Ludwig-Maximilians-Universität München (LMU) to enlist as a volunteer in the German Imperial Army. He served in the 1st Bavarian Field Artillery Regiment, rising to the rank of Oberleutnant and winning the Iron Cross of both classes for bravery. In 1918, he resumed his studies at the University of Erlangen. He passed his state examination in 1919. In 1920, he started work as a pharmacist in Landshut.

=== Paramilitary career ===
In 1919, Strasser and his brother joined the right-wing Freikorps led by Franz Ritter von Epp. The aim of the group was to suppress communism in Bavaria. He established and commanded the Sturmbataillon Niederbayern ("Storm Battalion Lower Bavaria"), with the young Heinrich Himmler employed as his adjutant. Strasser was known for his enormous stature, commanding personality, and boundless organizational energy. By March 1920, Strasser's Freikorps were ready to participate in the failed Kapp Putsch, whereas his brother Otto had temporarily aligned with the Social Democratic Party (SPD) and politically opposed the right-wing coup d'état.

== Political career ==
Hitler and other top SA officials at a party rally, 1928

=== Nazi Party activities ===
By 1920, Strasser, and his paramilitary group had joined forces with Adolf Hitler's Nazi Party (NSDAP), another far-right political party seated in Munich. During the autumn of 1922, Strasser officially became a member of the NSDAP and the SA. Strasser's leadership qualities were soon recognized, and he was appointed as regional head of the Sturmabteilung ("Storm Detachment"; SA) in Lower Bavaria. In November 1923, he took an active part in the unsuccessful Beer Hall Putsch, a coup attempt by Hitler and Ludendorff against the Weimar Republic. He was tried with other putschists shortly after Hitler's trial, convicted of aiding and abetting high treason—his actual arrest was for attempting to recruit soldiers for the NSDAP, which had been outlawed—on 12 May and sentenced to 15 months' imprisonment and a small fine.

After a few weeks, Strasser was released because he had been elected as a member of the Bavarian Landtag (for the Palatinate) on 4 May 1924 as a candidate of the Völkisch-Social Block, an electoral alliance of Nazis and the German Völkisch Freedom Party. In December 1924, Strasser won a seat in the Reichstag for the "völkisch" National Socialist Freedom Movement, a Nazi front organization. He represented the constituency Westphalia North.

After the lifting of the ban, and the reestablishment of the NSDAP by Adolf Hitler on 26 February 1925, Strasser rejoined the Party with membership number 9, and was appointed by Hitler as the first Gauleiter of Lower Bavaria. Because Strasser led up to 2,000 men in Landshut and was overworked, he began looking for an assistant. Heinrich Himmler, who obtained the job, was tasked with expanding the organization in Lower Bavaria. In December 1926, Strasser's Gau merged with that of the Upper Palatinate and Strasser headed the enlarged Gau. After a subsequent partition on 1 October 1928, the Upper Palatinate was taken over by Adolf Wagner while Strasser continued as Gauleiter of Lower Bavaria until 1 March 1929.

=== Role in the Nazi Party's national organisation ===
After 1925, Strasser's organizational skills helped transform the Nazi Party from a marginal south-German splinter party into a nationwide party with mass appeal. Due to the public-speaking ban issued against Hitler, Strasser had been deputized (by Hitler) to represent the party in the north and speak. Through much of 1925, Strasser took full advantage of his liberties as a member of the Reichstag; using his free railroad passes, he traveled extensively throughout northern and western Germany appointing Gauleiters, setting up party branches, and delivering numerous public speeches. Lacking Hitler's oratorical gifts to move the masses, Strasser's personality alone was nonetheless sufficient to influence an audience. His concerted efforts helped the northern party so much that before the end of 1925, there were some 272 local NSDAP chapters compared to the 71 that existed before the failed putsch.

To compete with Marxist parties for the loyalty of the urban working class, Strasser's northern bloc reinforced the "anti-capitalist", "socialist" aspects of the Nazi program. It was under the guise of this strategy that the group commonly referred to by modern opinions as the "Nazi Left" or "Strasser wing." Strasser established the Party in northern and western Germany as a strong political association, one which attained a larger membership than Hitler's southern party section. The party's own foreign organization was also formed on Strasser's initiative. He also founded the National Socialist Working Association on 10 September 1925. This was a short-lived group of about a dozen northern and western German Gauleiter.

Strasser's brand of antisemitic "socialism" is discernible from a speech he made to the Reichstag in November 1925:

We National Socialists want the economic revolution involving the nationalization of the economy...We want in place of an exploitative capitalist economic system a real socialism, maintained not by a soulless Jewish-materialist outlook but by the believing, sacrificial, and unselfish old German community sentiment, community purpose, and economic feeling. We want the social revolution in order to bring about the national revolution.

Despite disagreements with Hitler, the Strassers did not represent a radical wing opposed to the party mainstream. Gottfried Feder was more radical and held great favour at the time. Strasser's "socialism" also strongly rejected egalitarianism. In his June 1926 "Thoughts about the Tasks of the Future", he wrote:

We have to reject with fanatical zeal the frequent lie that people are basically equal and equal in regard to their influence in the state and their share of power! People are unequal, they are unequal from birth, become more unequal in life and are therefore to be valued unequally in their positions in society and in the state!

In order to elaborate a more detailed party program to assert its own direction within the party, the Strassers drafted the so-called "Strasser Program" of 1925–1926. While Gregor served as the political face of this program, its economic and ideological formulations were heavily influenced, if not primarily drafted, by his brother Otto. The program advocated for radical economic policies, including supporting the expropriation of the estates of the former aristocracy, the nationalization of key industries with a profit-sharing model (where workers would receive 10% of shares), the breakup of large agricultural estates into redistributed "hereditary fiefs" (Erblehen), and the establishment of a corporatist chamber system to replace the parliamentary republic. According to Reinhard Kühnl's analysis of the original text, this structure was designed to neutralize the political power of the labor movement; by replacing the principle of one-man-one-vote with representation through estates, its primary aim was to prevent the working class, which had the numerical advantage, from ever achieving political dominance. On foreign policy, it called for a "Greater German Reich" including Austria, a "United States of Europe," and the creation of a Central African colonial empire. It also contained a detailed section on the "Jewish Question," which demanded the expulsion of Jewish immigrants and the stripping of citizenship from all German Jews, who were to be legally reclassified as resident foreigners ("Palestinians").

Together with his brother Otto, Strasser founded the Berlin Kampf-Verlag ("Combat Publishing") in March 1926, which went on to publish the weekly newspaper the Berliner Arbeiterzeitung ("Berlin Workers Newspaper"). Strasser appointed the young university-educated political agitator from the Rhineland, Joseph Goebbels as the managing editor of the Kampfverlag, a man who was drawn to the NSDAP political message and to Strasser himself.

To deal with these proposed changes head-on, Hitler called for a meeting in the northern Bavarian city of Bamberg on 14 February 1926. Goebbels and Strasser traveled there hoping to convince Hitler of the new message. During the speech at the Bamberg Conference, Hitler lambasted the extreme ideas in the new draft, ideas which he conflated more with Bolshevism, a development which profoundly shocked and disappointed Strasser and Goebbels. Strasser's follow-on speech was bumbled and ineffectual, the result of Hitler's powerful oration; Joseph Goebbels noted with surprise in his diary that Strasser defended his own radical program draft "falteringly, trembling, clumsily" (stockend, zitternd, ungeschickt), behaving as if he could not fully identify with the words he was speaking. Hitler's refutation of Strasser's policy suggestions at Bamberg demonstrated that the party had officially become Hitler's and the NSDAP centered around him.

Placating the northern German NSDAP branches in the wake of Bamberg, Hitler assigned leadership of the SA, which was temporarily vacated by Ernst Roehm, to one of Strasser's own key members, Franz Pfeffer von Salomon. More importantly perhaps, Hitler began a personal campaign to lure away Strasser's chief lieutenant, Goebbels, into his personal fold—a move which proved immediately successful. The future Führer also struck a deal with Strasser to disband the National Socialist Working Association and asked him to assume responsibility for the party propaganda department. Strasser accepted this position, but a car accident in March 1926 proved a setback: he was bedridden as a result. Upon recovery, he was welcomed back into this position. Thus, in addition to his Gauleiter responsibilities, from 16 September 1926 until 2 January 1928, he was the NSDAP's national leader for propaganda (Reichspropagandaleiter). Beyond demonstrating little personal conviction at Bamberg, Strasser abandoned any pretense of acting as an ideological leader from the late 1920s onward. He formally ceded the role of the movement's ideological arbiter to Hitler, whom he now publicly praised for articulating the essence of National Socialism with "magnificent, philosophically compelling logic." Instead, Strasser retreated to the arena he knew best: party organization and power politics, as he left his propaganda post to take up new responsibilities as Chairman of the NSDAP Organizational Committee, later, the Organizational Department (Organisationsableitung). This pragmatic shift allowed him to consolidate his influence as an organizer, leaving the ideological domain entirely to Hitler.

Between 1928 and 1932, Hitler turned over the NSDAP's national organizational work to Strasser, whose skills were better suited to the task, as Hitler was uninterested in organizational matters and preferred to give his attention to ideological concerns. On 18 December 1931, Hitler granted Strasser the rank of SA-Gruppenführer and, in 1932, Strasser also became the editor of several biweekly and monthly Nazi news sheets. By June 1932, Strasser was named Reichsorganisationsleiter, and had further centralized the Party's organizational structure under his command. Before his resignation, Strasser had built a "party within the party." He controlled a massive bureaucratic apparatus based in the Brown House in Munich, commanding a staff of 95 managerial and clerical employees spread over 54 separate rooms. His "Reich Organizational Office" functioned as the administrative nerve center of the NSDAP, exercising centralized control over the party's political machinery. While Hitler captivated the masses with charismatic rhetoric, Strasser controlled the daily operations and the appointment of functionaries, resulting in a duality of power that increasingly unnerved "Hitler loyalists" such as Joseph Goebbels and Hermann Göring. During the course of the reorganizations, Strasser refashioned the NSDAP district boundaries to more closely align with those of the Reichstag and increased the authority of Gauleiters. Strasser reorganized both the party's regional structure and its vertical management hierarchy. The party became a more centralized organization with extensive propaganda mechanisms. In the 1928 general election on 20 May, Strasser was elected from electoral constituency 26 (Franconia) as one of the first 12 Nazi deputies to the Reichstag. While the NSDAP only received 2.6 percent of the national vote that year, it became the second largest party in the Reichstag by September 1930, securing 18.3 percent of the vote. Strasser's organizational strengthening contributed to this success and the Nazis became the largest party in July 1932 with 37.3%.

=== Rupture with Otto ===
The ideological differences between the Strasser brothers culminated in a permanent rupture in July 1930, an event that completely severed Gregor's ties with any open ideological opposition to Hitler. Gregor had already withdrawn from the affairs of their publishing house, the Kampf-Verlag, by 1928 at the latest. For years, Otto had published his most inflammatory political articles under Gregor's name, which utilized Gregor's reputation and parliamentary immunity to shield Otto from state prosecution. Consequently, Gregor was subjected to a series of defamation lawsuits that pursued him until a general political amnesty in late 1932. This forced Gregor to resort to legal maneuvers such as frequently changing his registered residence, obtaining fraudulent medical certificates of unfitness to travel, and even notarizing the transfer of his household assets to his wife's name to protect them from seizure. During a 1928 Reichstag debate over lifting his immunity for one such libel case, an opposing deputy suggested that Strasser lent his name to newspapers whose content he himself didn't write.

When Otto finally left the NSDAP to form the Black Front in 1930, Gregor publicly condemned his brother's departure as "pure madness." In confidential letters to party members, Gregor complained bitterly that Otto had treated him in a "humiliating fashion and the party in a treacherous way." He ridiculed his younger brother's ideological works, dismissing them not as genuine political theory, but as the product of "rational, abstract deductions from his work at his desk, enlarged by an extraordinarily strong assessment of his own ability." Gregor quickly adopted a highly critical stance toward Otto's management of the publishing house. In a private letter, Gregor expressed personal bitterness, revealing that Otto had usurped control of the newspaper Gregor had founded through a "series of disloyal chess moves" that had "completely destroyed" their personal relationship.

Following the split, Gregor firmly aligned himself with the party. As the Reichsorganisationsleiter, he actively participated in purging the party of dissident elements, including those sympathetic to his brother. The animosity between the two only intensified after Gregor's resignation from his party offices in December 1932. When Otto attempted to capitalize on his brother's political crisis to promote his own fringe movement, Gregor tried to stop him. In their first contact since 1930, Gregor responded with a furious letter: "You are highly dangerous for your friends and a tonic for your enemies... keep me out of your game in 1933!"

=== Conflicts with Hitler ===
By 1932, Strasser's conflict with Hitler had deepened due to strategic differences. Strasser, relying on his party organization, hoped to gradually integrate the Nazi Party into the state through legal coalition politics and administrative reforms. However, Hitler feared that a protracted strategy of infiltration would alienate the SA, worrying that the increasingly restless and militant stormtroopers, who were eager for immediate action, would become disillusioned and lose their morale if total power was not seized quickly and decisively.

In the same year, Gregor Strasser published an economic platform known as the Sofortprogramm. It primarily focused on job creation through state-funded public works projects, such as the construction of roads and canals. It also advocated for the agricultural resettlement of the East. Despite its prominence in Nazi history, modern historians have heavily questioned the originality of the program. According to German historian Gerhard Kroll, the Sofortprogramm was almost a verbatim copy of the theories of Robert Friedländer-Prechtl, a contemporary economic commentator of partial Jewish descent and a leading proponent of bourgeois-reformist crisis management. Kroll concluded that Strasser's primary intellectual contribution was merely translating Friedländer-Prechtl's technocratic concepts into the populist language of a political emergency program. This assessment was corroborated by Otto Strasser, who admitted in a 1974 interview that Friedländer-Prechtl's thought had "decisively influenced Gregor." Many of the core public works policies outlined in this plagiarized program were later implemented by the Hitler regime following Strasser's murder in 1934.

In August 1932, Hitler was offered the job of Vice-Chancellor of Germany by then Chancellor Franz von Papen at the behest of President Paul von Hindenburg, but he refused. Strasser urged him to enter a coalition government, but Hitler saw the offer as placing him in a position of "playing second fiddle". While many in his inner circle, like Goebbels, saw his resistance as heroic, Strasser was frustrated and believed Hitler was wrong to hold out for the Chancellorship.

Using his influence on the organization of the party, Gregor Strasser began making contacts with industrial circles, consistent with his new "Economic Construction Program" in October 1932, which toned down the anticapitalist rhetoric of his earlier "Emergency Program." He now called for tax cuts for the wealthy instead of hikes and advocated for price liberalization over controls. In a 1932 interview with American journalist H.R. Knickerbocker, he stated his new course:

"We recognize private property. We recognize private initiative. We recognize our debts and our obligation to pay them. We are against the nationalization of industry. We are against the nationalization of trade. We are against a planned economy in the Soviet sense."

Correspondingly, Strasser gained favor with moderate industrialists who viewed him as the only "sensible" Nazi capable of neutralizing the movement's radical elements. A notable example was August Heinrichsbauer, a lobbyist for the Ruhr mining industry, who organized secret subsidies estimated at 10,000 marks to Strasser every month. Strasser also received funds from liberal industrialists such as Paul Silverberg and Otto Wolff, the latter acting at the behest of General Kurt von Schleicher. These figures backed Strasser not merely to support the NSDAP in its anti-communist cause, but to strengthen its "moderate" wing against Hitler, hoping to integrate Strasser into a coalition government and "tame" the party from within.

Convinced that the NSDAP could not seize power alone, Strasser developed the idea of forming a broad parliamentary coalition, viewing an alliance with the Centre Party and various trade unions as the only viable path. Strasser's strategy appealed heavily to a party apparatus suffering in "desperate opposition"; for thousands of debt-ridden functionaries, his coalition plan offered an irresistible opportunity to secure stable state positions and normalize the movement within the Weimar system.

The ideological and personal rivalry with Hitler grew when the successor Chancellor Kurt von Schleicher had discussions with Strasser as to becoming Vice-Chancellor and the Minister President of Prussia, a position that controlled the vast Prussian police force, in December 1932. Schleicher hoped to split the NSDAP with Strasser's help, pulling Strasser to his "national conservative" side to stop Hitler. The urgency of this offer was magnified the next day when the Nazis suffered a disastrous 40 percent drop in their vote during local Thuringian elections. Convinced the movement was on the brink of financial and political collapse, Strasser saw Schleicher's offer as the only way to save the party.

Hitler was furious and demanded that Strasser refuse Schleicher's offer, he viewed Strasser's longing for administrative comfort and compromise as a total capitulation and a betrayal of the goal of absolute power. Propaganda minister Joseph Goebbels quickly moved to isolate Strasser, accusing him of plotting with Schleicher to divide the party. At a meeting of Nazi Reichstag members Hitler confronted the 30-40 that supported Strasser, forcing them to publicly support the former and denounce the latter. In a speech to party deputies on 5 December, Hitler rejected Strasser's "road of compromise," declaring that victory belonged only to those with the fanaticism to fight to the bitter end: "Only one thing is decisive: Who in this struggle is capable of the last effort, who can put the last battalion in the field."

Although historical consensus indicates that Strasser never intended to betray or split the Nazi Party, his openness to compromise was denounced by Hitler's inner circle as disloyalty. Despite his profound strategic disagreements with Hitler, Strasser retained a remarkable personal loyalty to him. Priding himself on rejecting the quasi-mystical Führer cult, he was the only senior Nazi who privately addressed Hitler as "Chief" or "P.G." (Parteigenosse). Yet, as historian Peter Stachura notes, Strasser was still captivated by Hitler's personality, rendering him one of the "most unsuspecting victims of the Führer-myth."

Strasser resigned from his party offices on 8 December 1932, just seven weeks before the NSDAP obtained political power. In a final address to senior Nazi leaders, he criticized Hitler's refusal to serve as Vice-Chancellor under Franz von Papen months earlier, arguing it was a catastrophic strategic error. Ultimately, however, his resignation appeared driven less by political principle than by a deep sense of personal humiliation. Complaining of being sidelined by Hitler's inner circle and treated with less respect than rivals like Göring or Goebbels, historians note, his final exit was not a calculated political maneuver, but an emotional collapse driven by a profound sense of betrayal in his personal relationships. After resigning from all party positions, he left for Italy to "recuperate" and abandoned the political machinery he had built.

Hitler temporarily took over the post of Reichsorganisationsleiter, eventually turning it over to Robert Ley. On 16 January 1933, Hitler "publicly repudiated Strasser" for his interactions with Schleicher. In March 1933, Strasser officially exited politics by renouncing his Reichstag seat.

== Later life ==
=== Life after politics ===
Having renounced his seat in the Reichstag, Strasser sought to return to his pre-politics profession as a pharmacist. Through his own connections and with Hitler's consent he was provided with the opportunity to take up a directorship of Schering-Kahlbaum, a chemical-pharmaceutical company that was the Berlin subsidiary of IG Farben, so long as he promised to cease all political activity, which he did. Strasser subsequently became the chairman of the National Association of the German Pharmacology Industry. He detached himself from politics, refusing to meet former political associates and reportedly found his new corporate life to be "interesting and stimulating." Contrary to some reports, he had no contact with his brother Otto's Black Front organisation.

=== Death ===
Having achieved national power in January 1933, Hitler and the NSDAP began eliminating all forms of opposition in Germany. In what became known as the Night of the Long Knives, the entire SA leadership was purged, which took place from 30 June to 2 July 1934. Hitler, along with other top Nazis such as Hermann Göring and Himmler, targeted Ernst Röhm and other SA leaders who, along with some of Hitler's political adversaries, were rounded up, arrested, and shot by members of the Schutzstaffel (SS) and Gestapo. Among them was Strasser. Historian Richard J. Evans surmises that Strasser was killed for having been offered a position by the predecessor conservative Weimar government, a tie which made him a potential political enemy, due to the personal enmity of Himmler and Göring, both of whom Strasser had been critical of during his role in the party's leadership. Whether Strasser was killed on Hitler's personal orders is not known. He was shot once in the main artery from behind in his cell but did not die immediately. On the orders of SS general Reinhard Heydrich, Strasser was left to bleed to death, which took almost an hour. His brother Otto had emigrated in 1933.

== Ideology ==
Although Gregor Strasser was long perceived, largely due to his brother Otto's post-war writings, as the principled leader of a distinct "socialist" faction within the NSDAP, historians such as Peter D. Stachura categorize his ideology as shallow, self-contradictory, and "intellectually mediocre." Strasser's brand of "socialism" was never systematically defined; rather, it remained a nebulous collection of emotional anti-capitalist slogans, romanticized praise for traditional Prussian virtues.

This lack of a coherent ideological core allowed Strasser to place his proclaimed beliefs under the power politics with flexibility. For example, his early, fiery condemnation of "Roman-Jewish fascism" were quickly abandoned when he advocated for a parliamentary coalition with the Catholic Centre Party, simply because state power seemed within reach. Similarly, his cultivated image as a pro-worker radical coexisted seamlessly with deeply reactionary social views, including his endorsement of the Nazi Party's anti-feminist doctrines and some nostalgia for the medieval guild model.

Perhaps the most glaring expression of Strasser's Realpolitik opportunism was his complete reversal on economic policy. Despite presenting himself as a staunch anti-capitalist in the 1920s, by 1932 he was actively courting liberal industrialists and Ruhr mining magnates. In exchange for their secret financial support, Strasser abandoned radical program and even advocated tax cuts for the wealthy.

While he may not have called for the physical extermination of the Jews in his writings, his anti-Semitism was a constant part of his worldview, aiming for the total legal, economic, and social exclusion of Jews from German society. Ultimately, historians conclude, Strasser was not a committed ideologue but rather an opportunist who used radical rhetoric as a tool to broaden his appeal and secure his own power base in the Nazi movement.

== See also ==
- List of Nazi Party leaders and officials
