= Strasserism =

Dissident current of Nazism

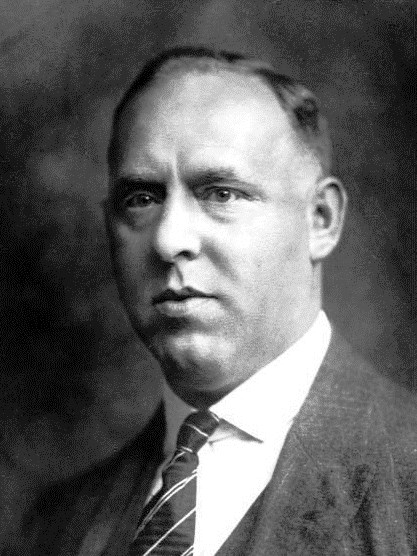
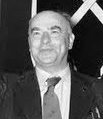
Gregor (left) and Otto Strasser (right), after whom Strasserism is named

Strasserism (German: Strasserismus or Straßerismus, see ß) is a dissident far-right current of Nazism associated with the brothers Gregor and Otto Strasser. The ideology was developed mainly by Otto Strasser. Like mainstream Nazism, it regarded the nation, rather than class, as the basic unit of society and was antisemitic, ultranationalist and opposed to liberal parliamentary democracy. Otto described his program as "German Socialism" and presented it as a more revolutionary alternative to what he regarded as Adolf Hitler's accommodation with capitalist interests and state-managed capitalism.

Otto Strasser called for the de-urbanization and re-agrarianization of Germany and for land and productive resources ultimately to belong to the nation. His proposed economic order of "state feudalism" combined hereditary fiefs, guilds and vocational estates with private enterprise, profit-sharing, private banking and interest-bearing finance. It was explicitly hierarchical: Strasser rejected economic and political equality and proposed an "authoritarian democracy" headed by a powerful president or non-hereditary monarch, alongside a selected political and cultural elite. His racial program called for the exclusion of Jews from the German nation and the removal of their citizenship and political rights. He also envisaged a "White Europe", a European federation and colonial projects.

Otto joined the Nazi Party in 1925 and became the main ideologue of the northern party milieu in which Gregor was the more prominent organizer. Otto broke with Hitler in 1930 and later founded the Black Front, but his movement had little political impact. Gregor remained in the Nazi leadership until resigning his party offices in 1932 and did not join Otto's opposition. Historians have questioned Otto's later account of a coherent "Strasserist" opposition within the party and have generally treated Gregor as a pragmatic organizer and power broker rather than the creator of a distinct ideological system. Gregor's 1932 Sofortprogramm was largely derived from proposals by the bourgeois reformer Robert Friedländer-Prechtl.

Otto's movement received material support from British intelligence and, according to contemporary reports and his own claims, from some German industrialists. After World War II, he recast parts of his program as "Solidarism" (Solidarismus), based on joint ownership of enterprises by private capital, employees and the state. Strasserist ideas later appeared in far-right, neo-Nazi and Third Position movements in West Germany, the United Kingdom and elsewhere.

== Principles and characteristics ==
=== Self-positioning ===
Otto Strasser's unique self-positioning predated his entry into the Nazi Party. In his own accounts of his service in the Freikorps—where he participated in the suppression of the Bavarian Soviet Republic—he portrayed himself as "the Red Lieutenant". According to this narrative, Strasser urged the old Imperial officer corps not to simply repress the workers' longing for social justice, but to "give guidance and leadership" to it, arguing that the traditional "governing classes" should adopt the socialist cause themselves and offer a national alternative to the Communist leadership he was taking up arms against.

Like mainstream Nazism, Strasserism saw the nation and its "nature", rather than class, as the central organizing principle of society. Strasserism's main difference from mainstream Nazism lies in a detailed and unique ideological framework for a radical, total reconstruction of society. Otto Strasser advocated for what he claimed was a more authentically socialistic alternative to what he condemned as Hitler's state-managed capitalism, and he labeled his own ideology "German Socialism." He contrasted his vision with what he considered Hitler's deviation from the movement's original path, particularly the party's dealings with capitalist interests and Hitler's specific strategies for seizing power, which he saw as a betrayal of anti-materialism and the German labour.

Otto Strasser made a consistent effort to portray his own faction as the genuine "left-wing" of the Nazi movement. In his 1943 memoir Flight from Terror, he claimed that the Nazi Party was only seen as the "Rightest" party due to Hitler's "pro-monarchist statements and industrial support," while asserting his own Prussian membership was "far more left than right". In the same passage, he presented General Erich Ludendorff as their own candidate, meant as an alternative to the mainstream conservative candidate, whom he portrays as a heroic figure in the earlier parts of the work. In his book Germany Tomorrow, published three years prior to this memoir, Strasser described the rejection of Prussian militarism as one of his key political objectives, condemned Prussia itself as an "appendage to Russia" and advocate for its partition.

Otto Strasser also equated Hitler's regime with both Mussolini's Fascism and Stalin's Bolshevism and criticized all three as totalitarian "State Capitalism" with oppressive bureaucracy. He condemned "State Socialism," which he considered to be the same as "State Capitalism," and presented his own model as the realization of a true "people's (nation's) State" (Volksstaat). (Note: Strasser, Otto. Germany Tomorrow. London: Jonathan Cape Thirty Bedford Square. p. 68-73.)

To express his opposition to the Führerprinzip, Otto Strasser reported that during his debate with Hitler in 1930, he had challenged the idea of human agency in history and dismissed the role of "great men" and even humanity itself ("Men") in shaping the history. Instead, human beings were nothing more than "the emissaries, the instruments of destiny."

In Otto Strasser's book Germany Tomorrow, he cited both Oswald Spengler and Tomáš G. Masaryk as the philosophers that guided his vision of "German Socialism."

Strasser later presented his ideology under the term "Solidarism": "Capitalism, the class rule from above, is the system of economic insecurity. Communism, the class rule from below, is the system of personal unfreedom. Solidarism is the system of economic security and personal freedom, in which all classes and estates work together for the common good." His motto was: "Monopolies for no one—property for everyone."

=== Racism and antisemitism ===
The early 1925/26 Strasser Program, with Otto as its primary ideologue and Gregor as its political face and promoter, proposed a systematic plan for segregation and expulsion of the Jewish population. It called for the expulsion of all Jewish immigrants who arrived after 1914, and also for the stripping of citizenship from all German Jews, who were to be legally reclassified as "foreigners" and "Palestinians" and lose all political rights.

In Otto Strasser's 1930 "Fourteen Theses," he accused "Jewry" (Judentum) of destroying the "German soul" and asserted that this destructive behavior stemmed "partly out of racial compulsion" (teils aus Artzwang) and "partly out of will", arguing that Jews represented an inherent threat of "racial degeneration" (rassische Entartung) to the German organism. (Note: Strasser, Otto (1930). Die 14 Thesen der Deutschen Revolution.)

In his 1940 book Germany Tomorrow, Strasser advocated for the support of Zionism. He presented Zionism not only as a way to separate the Jewish population from Germany, but also as a "genuine endeavour for the renovation of Judaism" that deserved the support of all "nation-conscious" peoples. While Strasser also deemed assimilation or "national minority" status as theoretical options to solve the "Jewish Problem", he allows the former only if the German Jews abandoned Judaism completely and guaranteed to become German "in every respect."

Strasser's vision of a "German Socialism" involved the preservation of a "White Europe", a goal already stated in his 1930 "Fourteen Theses". In 1952, he advocated for a global order with three "White and Christian federations"—the Confederation of Europe, the British Commonwealth, and the Pan-American Union.

After World War II, Strasser claimed that his prolonged exile was not due to the denazification policies of the Allies, but was the result of a conspiracy by Jewish, Communist, and Allied forces working together to silence him. Similarly, as early as 1942, Otto's close collaborator, Father Bernhard Strasser, claimed that the opposition to Otto in the West was orchestrated by "Communists and Jews"; he also attacked rival anti-Hitler figures as being "Jewish-maintained."

Douglas Reed, one of Otto Strasser's post-war sympathizers, attempted to portray Strasser's stance as a moral opposition to Hitlerian ultranationalism in his work Prisoner of Ottawa. Reed drew a moral equivalence between the Zionist state and the Hitler regime and attacked both as the products of cruelity and exclusivity; he also suggested that Jewish distinctiveness itself inevitably provoked persecution, casting Strasser not as an exclusionist, but as a figure with historical prescience whose proposals provided a necessary solution against "Political Zionism". This narrative contradicts Strasser's 1925 program, which tried to reclassify Jews as "Palestinians", and his advocation for Zionism to facilitate Jewish emigration in the 1940s.

=== Socioeconomic model ===
Strasser called for the deproletarianization, re-agrarianization, and de-urbanization of Germany. To achieve these, he advocated decentralizing industry and population away from major urban centres to a network of smaller towns and rural communities, arguing that this was not only made practical by modern technologies like long-distance electricity transmission, but was also necessary to make Germany less vulnerable to aerial bombing and gas attacks. (Note: Strasser, Otto. Germany Tomorrow. London: Jonathan Cape Thirty Bedford Square. pp. 150–153.) Strasser also called for the complete breakup of all large landed estates, with their ultimate ownership transferred to the nation. This policy was aimed at the traditional Prussian Junker aristocracy, whom he identified as the social pillar of militarism and reaction that must be removed.

This new order was to be realized through a socioeconomic model of national fiefs (Erblehen) and trade guilds. Under this system, all working citizens were to become Lehensträger (vassals) of the state, granted inheritable tenure to secure a family's livelihood for generations. The size of these agricultural fiefs was strictly regulated by labour capacity: a fief could be no larger than what a family could cultivate unaided and no smaller than required to provide subsistence plus a surplus for exchange. The fief could only be passed down to a male heir and would revert to the community to be re-allotted by local self-governing peasant councils "when the family becomes extinct in the male line." Local councils were composed of 25 members directly elected by active and retired landholders to act as the nation's agents and held absolute authority; they could reclaim any fief for "bad farming" or inefficient management and strip any fief-holder of their inherited position. His framework also outlined how the existing society could transformed to the new order: the existing landowners could become the new fief-holders of their own properties in the new order if they were deemed "effective managers" with a proper "attitude towards the German Revolution." The state, as the ultimate owner, would only collect a fixed "tithe" payable solely in kind (goods).

Strasser presented his economic model as a form of "planned economy," where a State Monopoly on Foreign Trade controlled the flow of all raw materials. "Vocational Councils" were to manage specific occupational interests and the allocation of economic fiefs, while a hierarchy of local, provincial, and national "Chambers of Estates" were to represent the social stratification of the population and supervise the broader administration. This model rejected direct state management of enterprises and confined the government's role to supervision and the issuing of licenses, but commercial autonomy was restricted by a system of "Chambers of Estates." These corporatist bodies had the power to intervene in matters of consumption, quality, and enforce a "just price" negotiated between the corporatist bodies and the State. Within this framework, Strasser nonetheless stressed that individual income, for both workers and managers, should be directly linked to performance and the success of their enterprise through a system of profit-sharing. This was designed to incentivize "wholesome rivalry" between firms, as each firm tries to outperform the other for greater reward.

Strasser argued that his system, by eliminating private ownership of productive monopolies and reorganizing society along vocational rather than class lines, would eliminate class conflict and restore an "organic" national community. This structure did not seek to eliminate hierarchy. On the contrary, consistent with his principle of the "inequality of men," its goal was to replace the economically defined classes of capitalism with a permanent and institutionalized system of estates (Stände). Specifically, Strasser proposed the division of the nation into five vocational corporations: workers, peasants, clerks and officials, industrialists, and the liberal professions. This principle was most clearly articulated in his vision for "factory fellowships," where the division between management and labour was to be cemented not as a mere difference in role, but as a state-sanctioned distinction in rank. He envisioned a new "estate" of managers—which he also called a "functional aristocracy" or "commissioned officers of economic life"—ruling over a subordinate "estate" of workers. This hierarchy extended to Strasser's vision for a new political and cultural elite. He argued that the state should be governed by a ruling group modeled on the historical ideal of the "Old German knight." Selected through the educational system, labour service, and a voluntary military, this elite represented the German equivalent of the English "gentleman." Strasser asserted that the cultivation of this elite was the prerequisite for the "Resurrection of the West."

Strasser rejected equality in the distribution of wealth and argued that "personal egoism" was a necessary and useful driver for the economy. His program placed no limits on the amount of money or commodities an individual could accumulate, and any surplus a citizen produced through extra hard work would be entirely "tax-free," provided this wealth was not used to privately purchase land, resources, or the means of production, which were strictly bound by the state's entail system. Strasser classified houses and buildings as "goods which can be augmented in quantity," allowing them to remain private property. Wealthy individuals could own multiple properties and collect rent, while the underlying land was leased from the state as a fief. He proposed that municipalities and cooperative building societies provide a sufficiency of new public dwellings to serve as a baseline to regulate the housing market.

While the State (as the ultimate "feudal" proprietor) extracted a fixed "tithe" from the enterprise's profits, the rest was to be divided in fixed proportions among the State, the manager, and the staff of workers as a whole. The manager was granted extensive financial control and retained the sole authority to determine the amounts set aside for depreciation and reserve funds before any profits could be distributed. Because the staff's proportion was divided among all employees, the actual distribution of wealth remained uneven. Strasser argued that the manager's individual share of the profits must be "comparatively large" to match his responsibility and status, as he would receive no fixed salary and his livelihood was to be funded "out of his share in the profits and nothing more." In contrast, the individual worker's share must be "comparatively small," serving only as a supplement to his basic wages—wages which the manager himself retained the power to prescribe. Strasser justified this structure by writing that it was "undesirable" for workers to receive copious profits because this would foster a "deleterious overdriving of the means of production" and lead to the neglect of technical and hygienic maintenance.

This structure was established in the new order from the moment of the transition from the existing society: while a worker received his new status through a share in the enterprise, the factory's original owner could retain his control of the enterprise as a state-sanctioned manager if he was deemed both an "effective manager" and politically reliable.

For handicrafts and small retail shops, Strasser proposed a different structure from the "factory fellowships." These smaller enterprises were to be incorporated into guilds. In these petty enterprises, the "boss" retained sole managerial and financial authority. Employees in these businesses were categorized as "apprentices" or "assistants" and did not have the right to share in the profits, since they were in a transitional training phase to eventually qualify as independent "masters." These guilds held authority over their trades, controlling apprenticeship quotas and enforcing quality standards. They were also designed to collect a lump-sum tax from their members that was to be paid to the state.

Regarding collective organization and labor, Strasser proposed the voluntary formation of producers' and consumers' cooperatives, while stipulating that the state would provide these cooperatives with "no material favouring," arguing this was necessary to maintain a "friendly rivalry" with non-cooperative enterprises. Strasser also planned to redefine the role of organized labour: future trade unions were to be transformed into simple "workers' cooperatives" dedicated strictly to vocational training and development. Their traditional economic and political bargaining functions would be eliminated and transferred entirely to state-integrated workers' councils and estates' chambers.

To accommodate accumulated wealth and facilitate trade, Strasser advocated for the preservation of interest-bearing finance and the revival of the "private bankers of the old days." He attempted to justify this by drawing a sharp distinction between a "capitalist" and a "business-manager" (entrepreneur). In his view, because the state's entail system prevented the monopolization of real property, true "capitalism" was inherently abolished; therefore, earning interest on money remained acceptable. While the Reichsbank would set an official baseline rate, smaller local credit institutions and private bankers would be given the latitude to determine their own interest rates. Because land and enterprises were inalienable state fiefs that could not be mortgaged, all loans had to be issued solely on personal security. Strasser argued that the higher financial risk absorbed by private lenders legitimized the charging of interest, asserting that this unsecured lending system effectively eliminated "interest slavery" and negated the traditional socialist objection to unearned income.

Regarding public assistance, Strasser proposed replacing the existing welfare structure with a unified, compulsory national life insurance scheme centralized under the Reichsbank. This system would guarantee a subsistence minimum for the unfit which was to be funded directly through automatic premium deductions from the citizens' wages and salaries. Individuals who desired higher coverage levels would be permitted to pay supplementary premiums, while Strasser stressed this would be done strictly at their own risk and responsibility.

Strasser stressed the retrogressive nature of his vision in his 1940 memoir Hitler and I and described his ideal economic order as nothing less than "state feudalism", where the state would act as the sole owner of land and lease it to private citizens.

Strasser expressed his praise for spiritual "creation" and his aversion to mere "labour", which he viewed as nothing more than a biological necessity that the modern industrial society had wrongly glorified. He argued that it was productive enough for modern factories to only operate in the winter, and proposed a seasonal industrial schedule that allowed workers to be "left free" during the summer for "creative" pursuits and to reconnect with the fatherland—which could dismantle the "murderous monotony" of year-round industrial toil. Strasser also rejected a "Spartan ideal" for the autarchy, describing his goal instead as a "Dionysiac ideal" that would eventually allow Germany to safely carry on a "luxury-trade" with the rest of the world. An important part of this worldview was his rejection not only of material progress, but also of the idea of human progress. He compared the stages of social evolution to the life of a man and claimed that any sense of progress is only a youthful "illusion" that fades with age. He questioned the cultural and spiritual value of modern inventions like the automobile and the radio. He also condemned modern industrial cities as a "nerve-destroying" and "murderous" environment and proposed moving the capital of Germany from Berlin, an industrial city, to a smaller town such as Goslar or Ratisbon (Regensburg).

After World War II, Strasser developed a new ideology framework called "Solidarism" (Solidarismus). The Solidarist model was based on a tripartite co-ownership structure, where the private-capitalist would retain a one-third share of an enterprise, co-owning it with the employees and the state. Historian Christoph Hendrik Müller describes Solidarism as "an attempt to incorporate the workers and the state into the capitalist mode of production."

=== Concept of the state ===
Strasser's view of the state was based on his belief that the state was not sacred on its own, but only a "suit of clothes" for the organic nation. Consequently, the state in his vision was designed to permanently insulate what he considered the sacrosanct essence—freedom, religion, and, above all, the nation—from the fluctuations of parliamentary debate. The state's duty was only to protect this essence, not to alter it.

To realize this vision, he called for the establishment of an "authoritarian democracy." (Note: Strasser, Otto. Germany Tomorrow. London: Jonathan Cape Thirty Bedford Square. p. 182-185.) The core of this system was a president (or non-hereditary monarch) elected for life as an unaccountable figure with concentrated executive power. To "balance" this power, Strasser designed what he considered a sophisticated system of checks and balances. Power was to be shared between three bodies: the president, a Great Council (composed of provincial presidents and ministers), and a Reich Chamber of Estates. Legislation would require the assent of any two of these three bodies. However, a critical detail made this balance largely theoretical: the president himself appointed the provincial presidents and ministers who constituted the majority of the Great Council, which gave him a built-in majority in any legislative contest.

Strasser argued this design to be necessary to prevent the rise of an individual dictator while also transcending the instability of mutable popular favor. In this regard, the state's duty was to protect the "nation's essence" not only from parliament, but from the people themselves.

To select the ruling class, Strasser proposed that all German youths must perform a year of compulsory labor, learn a trade, and undergo a character assessment. Afterward, they would have to serve voluntarily for many more years. Strasser believed that strictly enforcing voluntary military service was key to selecting the most outstanding and loyal citizens. Because military service required years of commitment, involved enormous personal risks in the event of war, and offered no knowledge that could be used for personal material gain, he argued that only those "nationally useful" would choose to enlist. This voluntary service was intended as a "racial selection" mechanism, ensuring that only the most outstanding candidates would form the "sustaining stratum" of the state. This elite stratum would extend across all regular vocations and estates, but its members would exclusively hold all highly esteemed, unremunerated public positions, such as magistrates and trustees.

Strasser's concept of the state also demanded a radical reform of the legal system. He believed that law must originate from the specific "peculiarities" of the people, rather than universal principles, and therefore called for the immediate repeal of the existing Civil Code. He proposed replacing the "Roman-Christian" concept of punishment with a "Teutonic" system that prioritized the protection of "honour" over property rights and focused on restitution rather than individual liability. Strasser sought to drastically reduce imprisonment for ordinary crimes, replacing it with fines or forced labor in state labor camps as compensation for victims. Any crime deemed harmful to society would be punished with temporary banishment, permanent banishment, or the death penalty.

His 1940 work Hitler and I called for the dissolution of Prussia and the adoption of a federalist "Swiss model." Under this plan, the state would be divided into 15 autonomous regions (Landschaften), where administrative authority would be exclusively given to local natives.

=== Foreign policy ===
Strasser also designed a geopolitical framework to secure economic self-sufficiency for a de-urbanized Germany, which involved a "European Federation" modeled on the British Commonwealth, which excluded Russia. (Note: Strasser, Otto. Germany Tomorrow. London: Jonathan Cape Thirty Bedford Square. p. 153-159.) (Note: Strasser, Otto. Germany Tomorrow. London: Jonathan Cape Thirty Bedford Square. p. 120.)

Within this framework, Strasser saw Eastern Europe—specifically Ukraine and Belarus—as an "internal colonial market" that should serve as a source of raw materials and provide "lucrative opportunities" for Western capital.

For overseas territories, he proposed a "European Colonial Company" (E.C.C.), a joint-stock entity controlling African colonies and distributing profits among European nations based on their investment in Africa. (Note: Strasser, Otto. Germany Tomorrow. London: Jonathan Cape Thirty Bedford Square. p. 110-113.) This structure was intended to secure the necessary resources to sustain his domestic economy without engaging in global free trade.

=== Stance on religion ===
Strasser's stance on religion changed many times to fit his political needs. In his early phase, as outlined in his "Fourteen Theses," he adopted a staunchly anti-clerical stance and accused "Ultramontanism" (Catholicism's political loyalty to the power of the Pope) as a "supra-national power" colluding with Jews and Freemasons.

However, his public position on religious issues had become more complex by the time of his exile. In his 1940 memoir Hitler and I, he constructed an elaborate narrative of ideological opposition between him and Hitler on religious issues and claimed that Hitler had opportunistically condemned General Ludendorff's "atheism" to appease Catholic leaders, and that Hitler himself was more of a "German pagan." Later, he reframed his 1930 split with Hitler as a principled, "German Protestant" stand against a "Roman Catholic, Italian fascist," and cast his own role as that of Martin Luther. Elsewhere in the same book, Strasser also condemned Hitler's persecution of the churches. In his other major work from that year, Germany Tomorrow, he presented Christian values as the "fundamental bond of the unity of the West," and viewed the "Germanization of Catholicism" and the "Catholicization of Protestantism" as signs of a coming religious renewal in Europe. In his later polemics, he would frame the conflict between him and Hitler as his struggle against Hitler's alleged "atheism."

Despite his public position, Strasser, a Catholic by birth, relied on support from his brother Bernhard Strasser, a Benedictine monk living in the United States, during his years of exile in Canada. Composed of his oldest comrades from the Black Front days, the "Cologne Group" veterans expressed surprise at his rhetoric and harshly criticized his programmatic drafts for proposing that voting rights be restricted solely to professing Christians, condemning such a move as tantamount to the "abandonment of intellectual freedom." To those who knew him intimately, however, this was entirely expected. According to former associates, Strasser had already joked in the 1920s about his willingness to exploit religion, claiming that if politically necessary, he would return to the "bosom of the Holy Roman Church," adding: "they will take me, those cowl-pissers" (Kuttenbrunzer). And after he returned to West Germany in 1955, one of his first political projects was an attempt to found a "Catholic People's Party" (katholische Volkspartei).

== Origins and development ==
Strasserism was mainly created by Otto Strasser, whose writings and political activities developed the doctrine in opposition to Adolf Hitler. Although the ideology is often associated with Gregor Strasser as well, this is largely the result of Otto's later efforts to link his dissident movement to Gregor's earlier prominence within the party after Gregor's death. Unlike his brother, Gregor Strasser never developed a distinct ideological system and remained within the Nazi party leadership until he resigned his party offices in 1932, without joining the opposition led by Otto.

In the mid-1920s, a bloc that modern opinions often label as the "Nazi Left" or "Strasser Wing" emerged within the NSDAP out of strategic necessity, led by Gregor Strasser, who was tasked by Hitler with building the party in North Germany. This group of northern and western Gauleiter realized that the völkisch and agrarian appeals, which were effective in rural Bavaria, were ill-suited for the industrial, heavily unionized north. To compete with the Marxist parties for the loyalty of the working class, they amplified the so-called "socialist" aspects of the Nazi program. Organized as the Working Community Northwest (Arbeitsgemeinschaft Nord-West), this bloc sought to elaborate on the party's vague economic promises by proposing a more structured socioeconomic framework. Otto Strasser joined the party in 1925 and quickly became the bloc's primary ideologue, promoting his early ideas in publications like the Nationalsozialistische Briefe (National Socialist Letters). In his later writings, he would portray this bloc as a principled, "socialist" opposition to Hitler's Munich-based leadership.

The efforts by the bloc culminated in the 1925/26 "Strasser Program" draft. While the draft was attributed to both Gregor and Otto Strasser, its radical formulations were primarily Otto's work. It called for a corporatist economic system under strong state supervision, which included the breakup of large agricultural estates and their redistribution as hereditary fiefs (Erblehen), compulsory guilds, and a system of corporate chambers to replace parliament. According to historian Reinhard Kühnl's analysis of the original text, this structure was designed to neutralize the political power of the labour movement; by replacing the principle of one-man-one-vote with representation through estates, its primary aim was to prevent the working class, which had the numerical advantage, from ever achieving political dominance. In foreign policy, the program demanded a return to Germany's 1914 borders and the establishment of a vast Central African colonial empire, reflecting traditional imperialist ambitions. It also contained a detailed section on the "Jewish Question" calling for the stripping of citizenship from all German Jews, who were to be reclassified as "foreigners" ("Palestinians").

The narrative of a principled "Strasserist" opposition as constructed by Otto in his post-war writings is questioned by scholars. Historians like Peter D. Stachura and Udo Kissenkoetter have systematically deconstructed Strasser's accounts as apologetic works filled with factual errors, internal contradictions, and self-serving fabrications, all designed to establish the anti-Hitler and "socialist" images of his brother and himself. His 1930 split from the party is noted by historians like Robert Gellately as having little political significance. Stachura also challenges the idea of a coherent "Strasser Wing," arguing that no such faction existed in any meaniful way and that it was little more than an expression of petty-bourgeois panic in the Weimar Republic.

The authorship and originality of the various "Strasserist" platforms are also open to academic debate. The early 1925/26 program draft put forward by the northern bloc led by Gregor Strasser contained radical antisemitic policies, such as stripping German Jews of their citizenship. While historical consensus points to Otto Strasser as its primary ideologue—a role complicated by his ghostwriting for his brother—Gregor's own commitment to these radical ideas was questionable. Contemporaries like Joseph Goebbels noted that Gregor's defense of the draft at the 1926 Bamberg Conference seemed to be half-hearted, which suggested that Gregor was not a genuine believer of the draft.

In the early 1930s, Gregor further turned towards a "realpolitisch" approach. His own economic platform, the 1932 Sofortprogramm, reflected this shift. It was a technocratic, dirigiste program focused on job creation through massive public works like building roads and canals. It also embodied the traditional German imperialist ambitions in its call for "settling people in the East" (Ostsiedlung). However, its originality has been debunked by historian Gerhard Kroll, who demonstrated that the program was plagiarized from the work of Robert Friedländer-Prechtl, an economist of partial Jewish descent and a prominent member of the bourgeois reform movement of the era. Many of the core policies of this program were later implemented by the Hitler regime after Gregor's murder in 1934.

By late 1932, Gregor Strasser was actively making contacts within industrial circles and receiving their financial support. In a widely publicized interview, he expressed his support for a pro-business platform that rejected nationalization and advocated for tax cuts for the wealthy. These activities led many historians to characterize him as a pragmatic party organizer and power broker, rather than a committed ideologue.

In the early 1930s, a different strain of radicalism emerged within the Nazi movement, mainly from the ranks of the Sturmabteilung (SA). Led by Ernst Röhm, some SA members began calling for a "second revolution" to bring about further social and economic transformation. While this anti-capitalist rhetoric seemed to echo some themes related to the "Strasserist" label, its motivations and organizational base were distinct from both Gregor's pragmatic state-capitalism and Otto's agrarian utopianism. Gregor Strasser, for his part, held a very low opinion of Röhm, whom he disparagingly referred to as a "pervert." Historian Ian Kershaw states that even the most vocal elements on the party's "revolutionary" wing "did not have another vision of the future of Germany or another politic to propose."

In July 1934, Adolf Hitler ordered the Night of the Long Knives, a political purge targeting the SA leadership and other perceived rivals. Among those killed were Ernst Röhm, the head of the SA, and Gregor Strasser.

Otto Strasser had been active in the Nazi Party but broke with it in 1930 over fundamental disagreements about economic policy and the structure of the state. While the party leadership emphasized centralized authority and sought to harmonize labour and capital under state oversight, Strasser advocated for breaking up industrial monopolies, placing key industries under public control, and reorganizing society through vocational representation and the partial inclusion of workers in a tripartite model of co-management. His vision was outlined in his 1940 work Germany Tomorrow most systematically, where Strasser called for a "re-agrarianization" of the country, large-scale de-urbanization and the re-establishment of a peasant society based on his principle of abolishing private property in land and means of production. His alternative was not direct state ownership, but a system of hereditary entails where the nation retained ultimate ownership while granting usage rights to individuals and groups.

After his expulsion in 1930, Otto Strasser founded the Combat League of Revolutionary National Socialists (the Black Front), a dissident organization which opposed Hitler's leadership in the Nazi party. The group not only attracted disaffected Nazis like the followers of Walther Stennes but also included figures from the far-right fringes of the conservative revolutionary movement. An example was Major Bruno Buchrucker, a monarchist and leader of the failed 1923 Küstrin Putsch, who had also suppressed worker uprisings with machine guns during the Kapp Putsch. Despite Buchrucker's open disdain for ideological programs, he formulated the "Programmatic Principles" for the group's first congress in 1930, which echoed Strasser's earlier publications. However, Otto Strasser's later split from the Nazi party ultimately had little impact, and his dissident group quickly faded to political insignificance in Germany; Meanwhile, mainstream Nazism continued its strategic appropriation of socialist-sounding rhetoric. Despite its anti-capitalist rhetoric, Strasser's movement received material support from British intelligence services and, according to contemporary reports and his own claims, from many German industrialists as well. Due to his growing opposition to Hitler, Otto Strasser fled Germany in 1933 and spent the following years in exile in Czechoslovakia, Switzerland, France, and finally Canada, only returning to West Germany in 1953 after World War II.

In West Germany, Otto Strasser created a new ideology framework, "Solidarism" (Solidarismus). According to historian Christoph Hendrik Müller, Strasser's framework provided a legal vehicle for attacking the Federal Republic's new democratic order where overt Nazism was proscribed. Its anti-capitalistic and anti-liberal rhetoric functioned as a form of coded economic antisemitism, allowing older völkisch ideas to persist under a new guise. Müller notes that this guise was adopted not only by Strasser's followers but also by figures with direct continuities to Hitler's Nazi regime and Hitlerite Nazism.

== Strasser brothers ==
Gregor and Otto Strasser were the sons of a Catholic judicial officer from Upper Bavaria. They were influenced by their father's ideals, which sought to combine nationalism, socialism, and Christianity while opposing both hereditary monarchy and unrestrained capitalism. Forged by their shared experience in World War I, the brothers began their political careers fighting side-by-side in the Freikorps to crush the Bavarian Soviet Republic in 1919. They then joined the early Nazi Party, where they formed a potent political partnership: Gregor as the charismatic organizer and political leader of the northern party bloc, and Otto as the primary ideologue who provided the theoretical substance for their bloc. They were both associated with the Kampfverlag press in the late 1920s. However, according to historian Udo Kissenkoetter, Gregor had already withdrawn from the publisher's affairs by 1928 at the latest, even though many of the radical articles published there were still being written by Otto under Gregor's name. This practice utilized Gregor's reputation and parliamentary immunity to shield Otto from prosecution, and in turn subjected Gregor to a wave of libel lawsuits. After Otto's formal split from the party in 1930—announced with the headline "The Socialists are leaving the NSDAP!" in the Kampfverlag media—Gregor quickly adopted a critical stance towards Otto. He expressed his personal bitterness over the situation, stating in a private letter how his brother had taken over the newspaper he had founded through a "series of disloyal chess moves" that had "completely destroyed" their personal relationship.

=== Gregor Strasser ===
Gregor Strasser (1892–1934) began his ultranationalist political career after serving in World War I. Along with his brother Otto, he joined the Freikorps and participated in crushing the Bavarian Soviet Republic in 1919. He then took part in the right-wing Kapp Putsch in 1920 and formed his own völkischer Wehrverband ("popular defense union"), which he later merged into the Nazi Party in 1921. Initially a loyal supporter of Hitler, Strasser participated in the Beer Hall Putsch and held high-level offices in the Nazi Party.

In the mid-1920s, Strasser, as the leader of the northern German party organization, formed a bloc known as the Arbeitsgemeinschaft Nord-West (Working Community Northwest). This group advocated for radical economic policies, including supporting the expropriation of the estates of the former royalty and aristocracy. In order to elaborate a more detailed party program to assert its own direction within the party, they drafted the so-called "Strasser Program" of 1925 and 1926. While Gregor was the political face of this program, its economic and ideological formulations are believed by historians to have been heavily influenced, if not primarily drafted, by his brother Otto. The program called for the nationalization of key industries with a profit-sharing model (workers receiving 10% of shares), the breakup of large agricultural estates and their redistribution as hereditary fiefs (Erblehen), and the establishment of a corporatist chamber system to replace the parliamentary republic. On foreign policy, it advocated for a "Greater German Reich" including Austria and the creation of a Central African colonial empire, as well as a "United States of Europe." It also contained a detailed section on the "Jewish Question," which called for the expulsion of Jewish immigrants and the stripping of citizenship from all German Jews, who were to be reclassified as foreigners ("Palestinians").

During the 1926 Bamberg Conference, Joseph Goebbels noted with surprise in his diary that , Strasser defended the radical 1925/26 program draft "falteringly, trembling, clumsily" (stockend, zitternd, ungeschickt), as if he could not fully identify with the words he was speaking. During a 1928 Reichstag debate over lifting his immunity for one such libel case, an opposing deputy suggested that Strasser lent his name to newspapers whose content he himself didn't write.

Besides having demonstrating little personal conviction for the radical ideology, Strasser effectively abandoned any role as an ideological leader from the late 1920s onward. Instead, he gave the role of the movement's ideological arbiter to Hitler, who he praised for articulating the essence of National Socialism with "magnificent, philosophically compelling logic." Strasser turned to what he knew best: party organization and power politics. This shift allowed him to consolidate his influence as a practical organizer and left the ideological domain to the Führer himself.

In the early 1930s, Gregor Strasser remained active in the NSDAP leadership. His split with his brother Otto in 1930 also distanced him from open ideological opposition to Hitler. This break was also the culmination of long-standing personal friction, as Otto had a systematical practice of publishing his most inflammatory articles under Gregor's name, which utilized Gregor's reputation and parliamentary immunity to shield Otto from prosecution, but caused a series of libel lawsuits against Gregor that pursued him until a general amnesty in late 1932. The legal battles became a constant drain on his time and resources, forcing him to resort to legal maneuvers such as changing his residence, obtaining medical certificates of unfitness to travel, and even notarizing the transfer of his household assets to his wife's name to protect them from seizure. After the 1930 split, Gregor sharply condemned his brother's departure from the party as "pure madness." In his letters to party members, he complained that Otto had treated him in a "humiliating fashion and the party in a treacherous way," and ridiculed his brother's ideological constructs as the product of "rational, abstract deductions from his work at his desk, enlarged by an extraordinarily strong assessment of his own ability." As the Nazi party's Reichs-organisationsleiter (Organization Leader), Gregor also actively participated in purging the party of dissident elements. The animosity between the brothers intensified after Gregor's resignation in 1932, when Otto attempted to use the situation to promote his own political movement. In their first contact since 1930, Gregor sent a letter to rebuke Otto, stating: "You are highly dangerous for your friends and a tonic for your enemies... keep me out of your game in 1933!"

Before his resignation, Strasser had effectively built a "party within the party" by late 1932. As the Reichs-organisationsleiter, he controlled a massive bureaucratic apparatus based in the Brown House in Munich, commanding a staff of 95 managerial and clerical employees spread over 54 separate rooms. His "Reich Organizational Office" functioned as the administrative nerve center of the NSDAP and had centralized control over the party's political machinery. While Hitler captivated the masses with charismatic rhetoric, Strasser controlled the daily operations and the appointment of functionaries, resulting in a structural duality of power that increasingly unnerved the "Hitler loyalists" such as Goebbels and Göring. Strasser hoped to use his organizational power to gradually bring the Nazi Party to power through administrative reforms. However, his strategy of gradual infiltration faced the risk of making the S.A. become increasingly restless. Hitler feared that if power was not seized soon, the stormtroopers—difficult to control and eager for action—would become disillusioned and lose their morale.

Gregor Strasser later published his own economic platform known as the Sofortprogramm in 1932. According to German historian Gerhard Kroll, Strasser's primary contribution was to skillfully adapt Friedländer-Prechtl's ideas into the language of a political emergency program. This assessment was corroborated by Otto Strasser, who admitted in a 1974 interview that Friedländer-Prechtl's thought had "decisively influenced Gregor."

Using his influence on the organization of the party, Gregor Strasser began making contacts with industrial circles, consistent with his new "Economic Construction Program" in October 1932, which toned down the anticapitalist rhetoric of his earlier "Emergency Program." He now called for tax cuts for the wealthy instead of hikes and advocated for price liberalization over controls. In a 1932 interview with American journalist H.R. Knickerbocker, he stated his new course:

"We recognize private property. We recognize private initiative. We recognize our debts and our obligation to pay them. We are against the nationalization of industry. We are against the nationalization of trade. We are against a planned economy in the Soviet sense."

Correspondingly, Strasser gained favor with the industrialists who saw him as the only "sensible" Nazi capable of neutralizing the radical elements within the Nazi movement. A notable example was August Heinrichsbauer, a lobbyist for the Ruhr mining industry, who organized secret subsidies estimated at 10,000 marks to Strasser every month. Strasser also received funds from liberal industrialists such as Paul Silverberg and Otto Wolff, the latter acting at the behest of General von Schleicher. These figures provided backing not just to support the Nazi party, but also to strengthen the "moderate" wing within the party against Hitler's "all-or-nothing" strategy. They hoped to integrate Strasser into a coalition government and use him to "tame" the NSDAP from within.

Convinced that the NSDAP could not seize power alone, Strasser developed the idea of forming a broad parliamentary coalition and viewed an alliance with the Centre Party and various trade unions as the only viable path. He entered into discussions with Chancellor Kurt von Schleicher, who on December 3 offered him not only the Vice-Chancellorship but also the key post of Minister President of Prussia—a position that controlled the vast Prussian police force. The urgency of the offer was increased the next day, December 4, when the Nazis suffered a disastrous 40% drop in their vote in local Thuringian elections. Strasser believed that the movement was on the brink of collapse and saw Schleicher's offer as the only way to save the party. This strategy led him into conflict with Hitler: contrary to a compromise to secure government positions and avert the party's downfall, Hitler refused to accept anything less than the Chancellorship and viewed Strasser's pragmatism as a betrayal of the movement's goal of absolute power.

Strasser's strategy appealed to a party apparatus suffering in "desperate opposition"; for thousands of debt-ridden functionaries, his coalition plan offered an irresistible opportunity to secure stable state positions as ministers, mayors, and police sergeants. To them, Strasser offered a path to normalize the movement within the Weimar system. However, Hitler viewed this longing for administrative comfort as a capitulation.

The tension reached its breaking point in early December 1932. Propaganda minister Joseph Goebbels now accused Strasser of plotting with Schleicher to divide the party, and Strasser found himself politically isolated. In a speech to party deputies on December 5, Hitler clearly rejected Strasser's "road of compromise," declaring that victory belonged only to those with the fanaticism to fight to the bitter end: "Only one thing is decisive: Who in this struggle is capable of the last effort, who can put the last battalion in the field."

Although historical consensus indicates that Strasser never intended to betray or split the Nazi Party, his openness to compromise was denounced by Hitler's inner circle as disloyalty. Despite his disagreements with Hitler on strategic issues, Strasser retained a remarkable and almost paradoxical personal loyalty to him. He only wanted to persuade Hitler to accept what he saw as the only realistic path to power. He was the only senior Nazi who privately addressed Hitler as "Chief" or "P.G." (Parteigenosse) rather than "Führer," priding himself on rejecting the quasi-mystical cult. Yet, as Stachura notes, Strasser was still captivated by Hitler's personality and become one of the "most unsuspecting victims of the Führer-myth."

On December 8, Strasser stated his resignation in a final address to senior Nazi leaders, where he also criticized Hitler's refusal to serve as Vice-Chancellor under Franz von Papen months earlier and argued it to be a major strategic error that had led to the party's current decline. His resignation appeared driven less by political principle than by a deep sense of personal humiliation. He complained of being sidelined by Hitler's inner circle and treated with less respect than his rivals like Göring or Goebbels. As historians note, his final exit was not a calculated political move but an emotional collapse driven by a profound sense of betrayal in his personal relationships. After resigning from all party positions, he left for Italy to "recuperate" and effectively abandoned the political machinery he had built. With Hitler's consent, Strasser later accepted a well-paid directorship at the chemical-pharmaceutical company Schering-Kahlbaum. He then became the chairman of the National Association of the German Pharmacology Industry, finding his new corporate life "interesting and stimulating." He was killed during the Night of the Long Knives in July 1934.

Gregor Strasser's ideology is deemed as shallow and self-contradictory by historians like Peter D. Stachura, who describes his thought as "intellectually mediocre." As pointed out by Peter Stachura, Strasser's "socialism" was never systematically defined and remained a collection of emotional anti-capitalist slogans, derivative concepts (as seen in the 1932 Sofortprogramm), and a romanticized praise for Prussian virtues. The lack of a coherent ideological core allowed Strasser to subordinate his professed beliefs to pragmatic political goals with remarkable flexibility. For instance, his fiery denunciations of "Roman-Jewish fascism" quickly gave way to advocating for a coalition with the very same Catholic Centre Party when power seemed within reach. Similarly, his supposedly pro-worker stance coexisted with deeply reactionary social views, such as his endorsement of the party's anti-feminist doctrine. Another expression of his opportunism was his complete reversal on economic policy. Despite his long-standing reputation as an anti-capitalist, by 1932 he was actively making contact with industrialists, receiving their financial support, and advocating for a pro-business platform that rejected nationalization and supported tax cuts for the wealthy. Though he never called for racial extermination, His committed antisemitism, which aimed at the legal and social exclusion of Jews, remained a constant. Therefore, Strasser was not a committed ideologue, but a "realpolitisch" opportunist who used ideological rhetoric mainly as a tool to broaden his appeal and secure his own power base within the Nazi movement.

=== Otto Strasser ===
==== Early life and völkisch activism ====
Otto Strasser (1897–1974), like his elder brother Gregor, began his political involvement after serving in World War I. During World War I, he joined the Bavarian Army as a volunteer and rose through the ranks to lieutenant. He would later attribute the formation of his "socialism" to his military experience during that time. After the war, the brothers first acted together in the Freikorps to crush the Bavarian Soviet Republic in 1919. Strasser later claimed to have earned the nickname "The Red Lieutenant" during this period. According to his narrative, he urged the officer corps to accept that the "governing classes" must give "guidance and leadership" to the workers' desire for social justice, offering an alternative to the communism they were fighting.

Unlike Gregor, who participated in the right-wing Kapp Putsch in 1920, Otto opposed the coup and initially joined the Social Democratic Party (SPD), supporting the Weimar Republic before growing disillusioned with parliamentary politics. During this same period, he was also intimately involved with the right-wing Juniklub (June Club). Alongside conservative revolutionary ideologues like Arthur Moeller van den Bruck, he regularly contributed to the club's nationalist weekly Das Gewissen (The Conscience), a group that notably sympathized with the Kapp Putsch. After receiving his doctorate in political science from the University of Würzburg in 1921, he joined the Reich Ministry of Food in Berlin as an assistant advisor, where he worked until 1922 or 1923, before moving into the private sector. Leveraging his wartime connections, he was hired by his former World War I platoon leader, Count von Hertling, who directed the large spirits conglomerate Hünlich-Winkelhausen. Strasser shortly advanced to become the director of the company's Saxony branch and then served as the Count's right-hand man in Berlin. At the time he was active in the völkisch movement and published numerous political articles under the pseudonym "Ulrich von Hutten".

==== Career in the Nazi Party (1925–1930) ====
Otto Strasser joined the Nazi Party in 1925, and he soon developed his own unique vision of Nazism. His ideology was based on a romantic anti-modernism and rejected both industrial capitalism and Marxist communism. Instead, he advocated for a radical reconstruction of society modeled on the Middle Ages: a "de-proletarianized," agrarian society consisting of national fiefs (Erblehen) and trade guilds, with political power exercised through a system of corporate estates (Stände) rather than parliamentary democracy.

Throughout the late 1920s, Otto authored many of his radical articles and speeches published under his more prominent brother's name. This practice shielded him from prosecution by utilizing Gregor's reputation and parliamentary immunity but subjected Gregor to a series of libel lawsuit. This relationship ended after their split in 1930.

==== Break with Hitler ====
Otto's rejection of the Führerprinzip and his insistence on breaking up large industries brought him into conflict with the party's leadership and ultimately led to his expulsion in 1930. Strasser's vision for the "German Revolution" was outlined in his 1930 "Fourteen Theses." Central to its economic vision was the concept of the nation's "supreme ownership" (Obereigentum) over land and mineral resources; under this system, all proprietors were to be reduced to the status of mere "fief-holders" (Lehensträger), who owed account and service to the state. The program called for a "Greater German Reich" stretching "from Memel to Strasbourg, from Eupen to Vienna" and acting as the "backbone and heart of white Europe." It demanded "sufficient living space" (Lebensraum) for Germany and declared that war was to be accepted as the "will of destiny" to achieve this goal. The manifesto concluded with a martial vow that "no sacrifice is too great" and "no war is too bloody" to ensure Germany's survival. It also called for the establishment of a "strong central power" to counter all "unity-destroying" forces. Its final thesis declared the movement's historical mission: to "overthrow the worldview of the Great French Revolution and shape the face of the 20th century." It rejected materialist goals and claimed that the nation's welfare lay not in a "boundless increase of living standards", but only in the preservation of the "God-willed organism of the nation." To protect this organism, the theses pledged to "fight with all means" against "racial degeneration" and "cultural alien influence". This new order was to be built by replacing "constructed parliamentarianism" with a system based on the "personal responsibility of the leaders" in place of the "irresponsibility of an anonymous mass." The program also called for opposition to what he termed "supra-national forces" such as Judaism and Ultramontanism and accused "Jewry" (Judentum) of destroying the "German soul." To facilitate the exclusion of Jews from Germany, the theses demanded a "German law" that would "recognize as citizens only the Volksgenossen" and strip Jews and others deemed alien to the "German soul" of all political rights.

In a manifesto titled "The Socialists Leave the NSDAP!", Strasser claimed that his departure from the party was based on his ideological principle and that any political compromise with the existing capitalist system was a betrayal of the German Revolution. He condemned the party leadership's increasing "bourgeoisification," where the pursuit of power had damaged its core doctrines. In terms of foreign policy, he claimed to oppose all forms of imperialism, any potential "war of intervention against Soviet Russia," and the leadership's support for "British imperialism" against the Indian independence movement, arguing that the weakening of any Versailles power would aid Germany. On domestic issues, he accused the party of abandoning its commitment to a "Greater German Reich" by tolerating existing state borders. However, the immediate impact of his secession proved to be minimal. As historian Robert Gellately notes, Strasser took "remarkably few prominent members with them, no district leaders or members of the Reichstag," and his opposition "quickly faded to insignificance." Shortly after his exit, Strasser unknowingly confided to an undercover police informer that while the NSDAP "was no longer revolutionary," he still considered Hitler's antisemitism to be "sincere" and it was politically "extraordinarily effective." Ultimately, his departure did little to alter the Nazi Party's course, which continued its strategic appropriation of socialist-sounding rhetoric. Nevertheless, in contrast to his brother Gregor, who favored pragmatic alliances, Otto presented himself as an uncompromising revolutionary.

To justify this split, Strasser published a pamphlet titled Ministersessel oder Revolution? (Minister's Chair or Revolution?), which detailed a confrontation he claimed to have had with Hitler. In his account, he cast Hitler as a traitor to the "socialist" cause. The confrontation was later framed as a clash of worldviews, where Hitler was a vulgar proponent of material progress and a "Roman Catholic, fascist" figure demanding absolute personal loyalty, while Strasser was a principled German Protestant. Evoking Martin Luther's famous declaration, he claimed to have challenged Hitler's demand for absolute obedience by asserting the primacy of the "Idea" over the "Leader," before declaring: "I do not believe in this progress... man has not changed in 1,000 years."

However, historians have seriously criticized his account and identified it as a largely unreliable polemic rather than an accurate historical record. Historian Peter D. Stachura also pointed out Otto's lifelong pattern of fabricating historical events, such as fabricating the 1920 meeting between Gregor, Hitler, and Ludendorff. Robert Gellately notes that Strasser's colorful retelling of the confrontation undoubtedly added "an anti-Hitler twist or two." German historian Udo Kissenkoetter has demonstrated that Otto was the primary ghostwriter for Gregor's public statements, making his entire portrayal of their brotherly relationship suspect. Rainer Zitelmann argues that Strasser's depiction of Hitler's views on key issues such as autarky, racial theory, and Hitler's alleged praise for Rosenberg's book "diametrically contradicts" Hitler's own statements documented in the period. Zitelmann and other scholars conclude that Strasser's report must be treated with extreme skepticism, as it was crafted with the clear political aim of portraying Hitler as a traitor to Nazi's so-called "socialism" in order to attract followers to his new movement.

==== The Black Front ====
A few months following his departure, Otto founded the Combat League of Revolutionary National Socialists, better known as the Black Front, a small dissident group formed in opposition to Hitler's leadership. Its ranks included figures such as Major Bruno Buchrucker—whom Strasser would later call his "best friend" (Note: In Strassers Book: Hitler und ich von 1940, p. 148f; cited from Patrick Moreau: Nationalsozialismus von links. Die »Kampfgemeinschaft Revolutionärer Nationalsozialisten« und die »Schwarze Front« Otto Straßers 1930-1935. Deutsche Verlags-Anstalt, Stuttgart 1985, ISBN 3-421-06192-0, p. 40.)—an avowed monarchist known for his brutal suppression of the 1920 Kapp Putsch workers' strike, and who considered ideological programs "inessential." Despite this, Strasser entrusted Buchrucker with formulating the group's "Programmatic Principles" for its first congress, a task which mostly consisted of adapting Strasser's own earlier writings. Strasser's Black Front attempted to create instability within the Nazi Party, most notably by supporting the 1931 Stennes Revolt, an uprising of the Berlin SA led by Walther Stennes. In his memoirs, Strasser would portray Stennes as not only an ally, but also an idealized revolutionary figure, and praise him as a "typical son of a Junker family, rich in the tradition of that military caste." During this period, Stennes provided Strasser with private letters detailing Ernst Röhm's homosexuality and urged him to publish them. Strasser recounted that he refused "on moral grounds," but also detailed how Stennes then gave the letters to the Berlin Chief of Police, leading to their widespread publication and a major public scandal for Röhm and the Nazi Party. In the wake of the revolt, several hundred of Stennes's expelled SA members joined the Black Front, and the two groups briefly merged into a unified organization called the "National Socialist Combat Community of Germany (Nationalsozialistischen Kampfgemeinschaft Deutschlands)".

In Strasser's own memoir, Flight From Terror, he claimed that the Stennes rebellion, which he had involved to orchestrate, was primarily financed by prominent industrialists who sought to remove Hitler from power. He specifically named the steel magnate Otto Wolff—whom Strasser described as "a Jew converted to Christianity"—as a key backer. According to Strasser's account, Wolff's motivation was partly to undermine his industrial rival, Fritz Thyssen, who Strasser deemed as a key backer of Hitler. Strasser justified the arrangement as a pragmatic necessity and described it as a "seemingly heaven-sent offer." He stated that in accepting the deal, Stennes would now be "beholden to a privileged group much the same as Hitler was". With the fund "lavishly bestowed" by Wolff, Strasser effectively launched a bidding war for the loyalty of the SA. He instructed his agents to combine sentimental appeals to "honor" with direct bribery, ordering them to offer "more money than Hitler had offered."

Despite the heavy expenditure, the results were meager. Strasser described the return of only "a few hundred" members as a "miracle" that made his faction "jubilant," but this sentiment quickly evaporated when the revolt ultimately failed due to Hitler's personal intervention.

==== Exile and collaboration ====
Strasser fled Germany in 1933 to live first in Czechoslovakia, then France, and eventually Canada, before returning to West Germany in later life, all the while writing about Hitler and what he saw as his betrayal of Nazism's ideals. During his exile, Strasser presented himself as a potential leader of a future German revolution and was briefly considered by British and Canadian officials as a possible asset. Strasser's collaboration with British intelligence services began in the 1930s, when he was utilized by MI6 to operate a black propaganda radio station from Czechoslovakia. This project utilized Strasser's identity as an insider in the Nazi movement to disseminate rumours against the Nazi regime, though such methods were already a developed concept within British intelligence. The reliability of the information Strasser provided is highly questionable, as historian Ian Kershaw dismisses Strasser's stories about Hitler's deviant sexual practices as "fanciful... of an out-and-out political enemy."

In January 1935, for security reasons, Otto sent his pregnant wife and their three-year-old daughter to Samos, where their son, Gregor Peter Demosthenes, was born in May. In a telegram to Hitler, Strasser referred to his newborn son as "Gregor II."

During his exile in 1940, Strasser published Germany Tomorrow, which was a systematic attempt to present his ideology to a Western audience. In this book, he praised Christian values as the "fundamental bond of the unity of the West," rejected Prussian militarism and centralization, and cited the British Commonwealth as a model for a future "European Federation." Contrary to his demand for a "strong central power" and his vow that "no war is too bloody" in his 1930 "Fourteen Theses," Strasser now claimed that he and Gregor had actually sought a decentralized "Swiss model" and the destruction of Prussian militarism. He also advocated for a "disarmed Europe" and asserted that a post-Hitler Germany would have "no territorial demands" beyond "honest plebiscites." At the same time, he began to recount an earlier conversation he claimed to have had with his brother Gregor, who had been killed in 1934. According to this account, he had told Gregor:

"We are Christians; without Christianity Europe is lost. Hitler is an atheist."

He also presented his vision for a new European order, which included a plan for the "liberation" of Ukraine and Belarus from the Soviet Union to serve as an "internal colonial' market" for Europe and a buffer against Bolshevism. As his solution to the "Jewish problem," he advocated for Zionism as an ideal path to achieving a physical separation of Jews from Germany by categorizing them as "foreigners" belonging to their own nation.

In the same year, the Austrian Jewish refugee writer Willi Frischauer issued a public warning against Strasser's movement. In his 1940 book The Nazis at War, Frischauer reported that the Black Front was financing its activities through the sale of bonds, which were promised to be redeemed after the movement seized power in Germany. According to Frischauer's account, these funding bonds were issued in two separate categories: Series "A" was sold exclusively to "Aryans", while Series "J" was sold exclusively to Jews.

During his wartime exile, Strasser temporarily relocated to Bermuda in late 1940. Local observers noted he retained highly militaristic German mannerisms; archival notes describe him as someone who would "bow from the waist and click his heels at the slightest provocation." Even as a refugee, Strasser continued to comment on the conflict, claiming that Hitler had made a strategic error by not attacking Great Britain sooner, which Strasser attributed to Hitler being "mentally unable to depart from his well-tried plan of dealing with the weakest first." In December 1940, Strasser had an encounter with the famous English author H.G. Wells, who was stranded in Bermuda due to bad weather. Intrigued by the dissident, Wells arranged an interview to discuss the post-war order. The meeting resulted in a clash of worldviews. Wells advocated for a rational, secular "order of science" devoid of nationalism and religion, a concept Strasser rejected, citing his Catholicism. During the interview Strasser shouted "Heil Germany!" repeatedly. The encounter left Wells deeply alarmed by the leniency shown to the exile. In an article published in January 1942, Wells publicly denounced Strassers as "blood-stained-Nazis." He described Otto as a "quite insanely anti-Bolshevik and soaked to the marrow with the idea of the German people being first and foremost in Europe and the world." Wells publicly demanded to know why officials in the United Kingdom and Canada actively "petted and encouraged" Strasser rather than throwing him in a concentration camp.

In 1941, elements of the Black Front contributed to the foundation of the Free-Germany Movement, modeled on Free France and based largely in Latin America. It called for a democratic constitution, federalism and regional autonomy, peace between democracies and God-fearing policies. The movement was politically broader than the Black Front and united Christian, national-conservative, and social democratic exiles whose only shared stance was anti-communism. However, its ideological heterogeneity soon led to fragmentation. While Strasser's initial utility to the Allies was acknowledged, it did not last, as distrust and conflicting interests emerged among the Allied powers. The Soviet Union disliked his strident anti-Bolshevism, and the Americans were never fully convinced of his usefulness. William Donovan, head of the US Office of Strategic Services (OSS), warned President Roosevelt that Strasser "is by no means so much anti-Nazi as anti-Hitler ... At heart he subscribes to the principles of National Socialism...." Despite such skepticism, it was evident that British and Canadian governments considered using him as a potential leader of an underground intelligence network, and his claims to control a powerful internal group like the Black Front were taken seriously by some officials. However, Strasser's claims of controlling a vast underground network in Germany were largely exaggerated; there is little evidence indicating that the Black Front had any significant presence in Germany. Eventually, concerns regarding his strong anti-communist stance, his unclear political positioning, and his limited verifiable influence led Allied officials to view him with caution, and he was not considered a viable long-term political partner. As the war progressed, Canadian authorities came to view him as a political liability rather than an asset. They placed him under surveillance and restricted his political activities, including his ability to publish, which was his primary means of income. Consequently, he spent the latter part of the war in relative isolation and financial difficulty on a farm in Nova Scotia, at times relying on support from his brother Bernhard Paul Strasser, a Benedictine monk living in the United States (who characterized the anti-Nazi "Free German Movement" in New York as a conspiracy established "by Communists and Jews" specifically directed against his brother).

==== Return to West Germany and death ====
While in exile in Canada, Strasser remained in contact with nationalist groups in West Germany. In early 1949, journalist Bill Downs reported that the Strasser movement had already pledged subscriptions totaling one million marks, mostly from German industrialists. Shortly before this, he forwarded a character assessment produced by a Frankfurt clairvoyant and graphologist to his West German headquarters, noting to his deputy Kurt Sprengel the positive psychological effect the document would have on supporters.

According to a 1950 report based on his own statements, Otto Strasser positioned himself as being opposed to forming alliances with either the Eastern or Western blocs by claiming he had rejected an invitation from East Germany's "National Front." However, this policy did not prevent divisions among his few remaining followers. Veterans of the "Cologne Group," who had endured years in concentration camps for their Black Front ties, openly revolted against Strasser himself and his deputy Kurt Sprengel because of Strasser's suppression of them and his alleged abandonment of their early ideals. A feud erupted between his long-time deputy, Bruno Fricke, the son of a Berlin banker who favored an Eastern orientation, and Waldemar Wadsack, a former bank manager and economist from Breslau who led the pro-Western faction. Wadsack had been tortured and stripped of his property by the SA on charges of joining the Black Front (considered baseless at the time), and had spent nearly seven years in prisons and concentration camps for high treason waiting for Strasser; Wadsack was a key functionary under his leadership. He was primarily used as a pawn to suppress the rebellious "Cologne Group," even though Strasser privately mocked him and fellow deputy Kurt Sprengel as outmatched "zeroes" (Nullen). As the factional infighting worsened, Wadsack actively undermined his rival, writing to Strasser to dismiss Fricke as a "selfish wannabe" and urging stricter action against him. The conflict culminated in 1951 with Fricke's departure, who broke with Strasser and accused his former leader of abandoning ideals for "business politics for the sake of earning a living" (Geschäftspolitik zum "Brotwerb").

Strasser was permitted to return to West Germany in 1955 after a lengthy legal battle and settled in Munich. Among his projects was an effort to found a "Catholic People's Party" (katholische Volkspartei) with the help of his brother Bernhard, which reflected the final evolution of his opportunistic approach towards religious issues. His most notable post-war organization, the German Social Union (Deutsch-Soziale Union), founded in 1956, also failed to gain any significant support. He then withdrew into private life, though he remained a prolific writer committed to his ideology. According to his son, who recalled their relationship as distant, Strasser was focused on "politics and history, but little interested in anything else," living in an apartment crammed with "files, books, and newspaper clippings."

In his later works, Strasser continued to defend and systematize his ideology. In his 1962 book Fascism (Der Faschismus), he sought to distinguish his own brand of "socialism" from the fascism of Hitler and Mussolini by defining fascism as a form of state idolatry. According to him:

"Whoever praises and wishes to strengthen the state, he is a fascist; whoever wants to give the state new tools and to make its bureaucracy mightier, he is a fascist."

His effort culminated in 1969 with the publication of a political autobiography pointedly titled Mein Kampf (My Struggle), a revised version of an earlier work.

Strasser remained an active propagandist for his cause. In 1971, he conducted a speaking tour across the United States, where he addressed an estimated 10,000 people and attracted considerable media attention. He died in Munich in August 1974. In its obituary, The New York Times described Strasser as "Hitler's Trotsky".

== Worldview and theory ==
The ideology of Strasserism not only rejected the notion of material progress, but also rejected the idea of human progress and human agency in history. This was revealed in Strasser's account of his own words in a debate with Hitler. According to Strasser's account, when Hitler praised the role of "great men," he retorted that humanity itself ("Men"), were not the creators of historical epochs but only "the emissaries, the instruments of destiny." And when confronted with the "marvels of technology," he declared he "had to deny the so-called progress of mankind to begin with, because I was unable to regard the invention of the toilet as a work of culture," before continuing:

"I don't believe in the progress of humanity, Herr Hitler. Men have not changed in the last thousand years.... Do you think that Goethe would have been happier if he had been able to ride in a motor car or Napoleon if he had been able to broadcast?" (Note: Strasser, O., Mein Kampf. Eine politische Autobiographie (My Struggle. A Political Autobiography) (Frankfurt/M., 1969), p. 62, quoted in Zitelmann, Rainer (2022). Hitler's National Socialism. Oxford: Management Books 2000 Ltd.)

His belief that history was a predetermined biological cycle, rather than a linear process of development shaped by human action, formed the foundation of his "Conservative Revolution" philosophy, with Oswald Spengler's theories on the organic nature of cultures and the rhythm of history being one of his most important inspirations. Building upon Spengler's macro-historical cycle, Strasser developed his own cyclical theory of history, the "Law of Triune Polarity," where he compared the course of history to the Earth's rotation on its axis. According to this theory, history oscillates in approximately 150-year rhythms between two fundamental poles: a "we-idea" (conservatism, community, socialism) and an "ego-idea" (liberalism, individualism, capitalism). Strasser claimed that the liberal epoch inaugurated by the French Revolution was ending, and the world was entering a new conservative, socialist era beginning with the "German Revolution" of 1914.

His idea about a new conservative era extended to his vision for cultural and spiritual life. Strasser called for the "freedom of faith and conscience" and advocated for the separation of church and state. He championed the independence of art, science, and the press from what he termed the "rule of the average man." He also asserted that "liberty does not mean libertinage" and demanded that all press contributions be signed, making writers personally and legally responsible, and proposed an advertisement monopoly to sever the link between news and commerce, creating a press accountable not to the market, but to a different set of controls.

Consistent with his "conservative realism," which rejected both liberal individualism and Marxist materialism, he argued that a valid economic system must be deduced from what he defined as the innate "German nature", a character marked by a "longing for his own peculiar style, for independence, for delight in responsibility and joy in creation." He contrasted the "joy in creation" with the drudgery of "labour" and dismissed the "Song of Labour", which was sung by both Capitalists and Marxists in his view, as a device to train "diligent slaves." As already laid out in his "Fourteen Theses," an important principle of his worldview is the "inequality of men" (Ungleichheit der Menschen), which provided the philosophical justification for his hierarchical social and political vision.

Strasser's vision for social renewal involved a radical policy of de-urbanization and re-agrarianization, which he saw as essential to reviving Germany's agricultural base and restoring the moral foundations of rural life, and to solving what he perceived as the spiritual crisis of the modern German worker—their "homelessness, discontent, and purposelessness." He believed that urban concentration was both a symptom and a driver of capitalist decay—undermining social cohesion, weakening personal responsibility, and accelerating cultural decline. For Strasser, these policies were central to the primary task of German Socialism: the "de-proletarianization" of the German people.

He argued that the alienated and propertyless industrial worker in the modern time represented a source of instability and Marxist influence. His solution was to transform the proletariat into a new class of property-holding small producers, which would restore their connection to the nation and eliminate the basis for class conflict. Strasser also called for the "disintegration of titanic enterprises" and an end to the "tyranny of technique," viewing the modern factory with its "murderous monotony" as an "unmitigated curse." In Strasser's ideal Germany, the "nerve-destroying giant towns" would be abandoned, and the capital of the Reich would be moved from Berlin to a smaller town like Goslar or Ratisbon, which symbolized a definitive break with the industrial, centralized state of the past.

His ideal society was a new system of land tenure modeled on medieval feudalism. This required the complete overthrow of the existing land ownership structure, especially that of the traditional Prussian aristocracy, whose land was to be expropriated and reassigned by the nation to individual farmers as non-transferable but inheritable fiefs (Erblehen). Strasser distinguished this from private property by defining it as Besitz (possession or usufruct) rather than Eigentum (absolute ownership), meaning the holder could use and profit from the land but could not sell, damage, or neglect it. Therefore, the individual farmer or industrial manager in this society was not an owner in the liberal sense, but a Lehensträger—a fief-holder of the nation, whose right to possession was conditional upon fulfilling their duty to the national community. This system was seen by him as essential to restoring rural autonomy and ensuring national food security as a core component of his goal of autarky, and as the only way to restore a moral counterpoint to the fragmentation of modern industrial society. He also called for the preservation of individual initiative within a regulated economic order and a political structure based on federalism, local autonomy, and indirect democratic mechanisms inspired by the Catholic principle of subsidiarity.

Strasser's wider political program also reflected his rejection of Prussian militarism and authoritarianism. He criticized "Prusso-German imperialism" and equated it with the "Asiatic power of Russia." by labeling Prussia an "appendage to Russia," He sought to counter it by abolishing conscription and replacing it with a fully voluntary military. In his view, the traditions of centralized command and compulsory military service had distorted Germany's political development and moral character. He believed that a true cultural shift away from militarism would only be achieved when the German people embraced different values, as he wrote that the "spirit of militarism will have been definitively overcome" only when people grasp that "schools of cookery are much more important than schools of politics." His opposition to Prussian tradition also shaped his broader criticism towards authoritarian systems and centralization.

In Germany Tomorrow, Otto Strasser rejected both mainstream fascism and Marxist communism as forms of totalitarianism, and he specifically identified Adolf Hitler and Joseph Stalin as parallel embodiments of centralized authority and bureaucratic control. He condemned both systems as forms of "State Capitalism" and stated that the direct management of enterprises by the state was a "blight of bureaucracy" that crushed individuality and created a new "official class," which was even more oppressive than private capitalists. He declared:

"The fascists and the communists rival one another in glorifying the state, in suppressing economic and personal independence, in unduly extolling power and the successes of organization, of decrees, of planning, and – as a last requisite – the police."

As a safeguard against totalitarianism, Strasser argued for the "rejection of party democracy," viewing the abolition of all political parties as the only way to prevent the revival of "the Nazi and Bolshevik party movements." (Note: Strasser, Otto. Germany Tomorrow. London: Jonathan Cape Thirty Bedford Square. p. 66-67.) Though framed as a democratic alternative to the Führerprinzip, his model concentrated executive power in a president (or non-hereditary monarch) elected for life, a system he described as "authoritarian democracy."

Otto Strasser outlined a detailed solution to the "colonial problem", which he saw as a problem of securing raw materials for Europe. He proposed the formation of a new corporate entity, the "European Colonial Company" (E.C.C.), to take over and administer a portfolio of African territories. The structure of the E.C.C. resembled a joint-stock company where the European "have-not" nations (like Germany and Poland) would subscribe funds and receive shares and administrative posts on a pro rata basis. The plan was designed to not challenge the interests of the dominant colonial empires and excluded Great Britain and France from its framework, targeting instead the possessions of weaker states like Belgium and Portugal, alongside Germany's former colonies. For the existing owners (Belgium and Portugal), Strasser's plan included detailed buyout terms, such as guaranteeing their flags could continue to fly and offering a ninety-nine year right to financial returns based on previous yields. Strasser justified the project on two fronts. For Europe, it would prevent future wars over colonies and provide a "great civilizing work" that would be "most beneficial to the youths of Europe." For the native populations, the company's role would be that of a "guardian," tasked with their advancement and their partial inclusion in the administration.

Otto Strasser also supported a nationalist form of Pan-European unity while expressing admiration for Richard von Coudenhove-Kalergi. In Germany Tomorrow, he advocated for a "European Federation," citing the British Commonwealth as a model for its "minimum of coercion, a maximum of freedom." In this context, he called for policies including "the gradual abolition of all customs barriers upon free trade," the "discontinuance of...passports," and "unified currency systems." He excluded Russia from this federation because Russia "never has belonged, and never will belong" to Europe. He further envisioned a European order in which Western Slavic nations, particularly Poles and Czechs, would take the lead in integrating Ukraine and Belarus into a wider European system. He described these regions as economically backward and politically disconnected. The "liberation" of Ukraine and Belarus from the Soviet Union was presented by Strasser as a fraternal duty that would serve to supply Europe with an "'internal colonial' market for their wares," furnish "western capital with lucrative opportunities for investment," and serve as a buffer against Bolshevism. Strasser also suggested collaborating with Japan to advance this anti-Bolshevik new order. His proposal for a "composite European army" assigned the core fighting roles—light artillery and infantry—to Germany, while allocating aviation to Britain and heavy armor to France.

In Germany Tomorrow, Strasser rejected the violent, biological antisemitism of the Hitler regime and proposed what he deemed as a rational solution to the "Jewish problem." This included his support for Zionism:

"The category of foreigners emerges from the fact that of late years there has been a widespread development of the movement known as Zionism, which should be supported by all 'nation-conscious' persons and peoples as a genuine endeavour for the renovation of Judaism."

For Strasser, Zionism was the ideal path to achieving a physical separation of Jews from Germany and categorizing them as "foreigners" belonging to their own nation. For those Jews who wished to remain, he proposed the status of a protected "national minority," which would grant them communal rights but formally exclude them from the German national body; or assimilation, which required them to "abandon Judaism as a national religion" and provide "other guarantees of their determination to become Germans in every respect."

A foundational principle of Strasser's ideology was his clear distinction between negotiable and non-negotiable spheres of public life. In his opinion, the truly essential issues concerning mankind—freedom, religion, and, above all, the nation—were sacrosanct and were not political questions to be settled by majority vote or parliamentary debate, but must be determined by timeless principles that defined a people's existence. Therefore, such matters must be completely placed beyond the authority of any legislative body. Consistent with his view that the nation, not class or even religion, was the ultimate driving force of history, one of Strasser's primary focuses was to create a political system where the "national essence" of Germany was permanently insulated from democratic processes.

Strasser's view of reality where abstract ideals are placed above the material and social spheres, has been described by historian Christoph Hendrik Müller as "German Idealism in its crudest form." In Strasser's framework, the abstract "idea" of the nation is considered the superior historical force that overrides the concrete economic or social interests of class. This explains why Strasser believed parliament could be relegated to only administrative tasks concerning the economy; in his view, the truly important questions of national destiny were not matters of political compromise but of metaphysical principle. By insulating these "sacrosanct" issues from democratic processes, his system aimed to protect the nation's perceived eternal essence from the fluctuations of popular opinion.

== Influence ==
=== In Finland ===
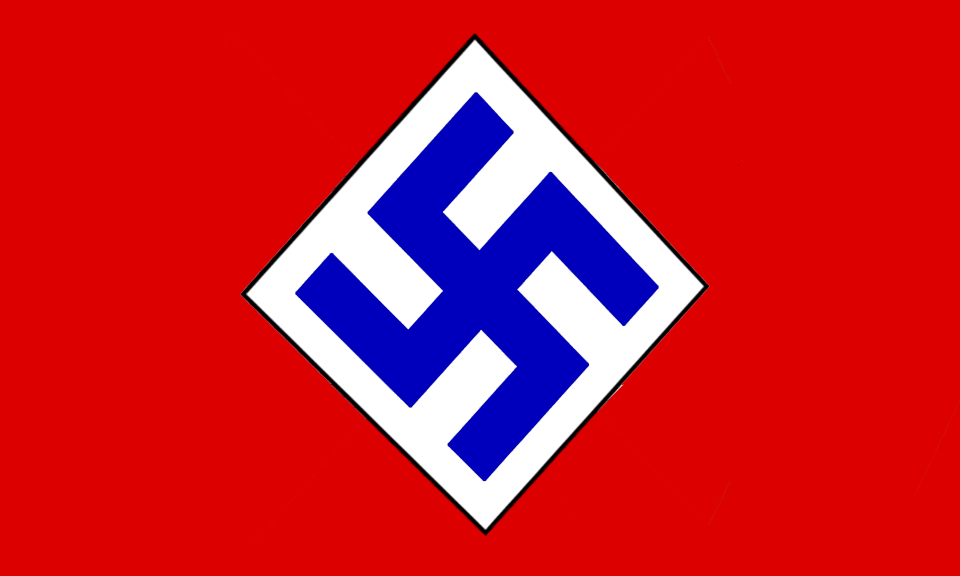
Flag of the SKSL

Finnish politician Yrjö Ruutu founded the National Socialist Union of Finland (SKSL) in 1932, which was one of several Finnish Nazi parties at the time. Ruutu's ideas included the nationalization of large companies and other assets vital for national interests, a self-sufficient planned economy, a parliament controlled by trade unions and the appointment of technocrats as ministers. Ruutu's party remained on the fringes of Finnish politics and never gained any seats in parliament, but it is considered to have had a considerable influence on the ideology of the Academic Karelia Society and president Urho Kekkonen. In 1944, all Nazi parties in Finland were dissolved as contrary to Article 21 of the Moscow Armistice, which forbade fascist parties. Some former members of Ruutu's party, such as Yrjö Kilpeläinen and Unto Varjonen, became prominent figures in the right-wing faction of the post-war Social Democratic Party of Finland. Another prominent former member, Vietti Nykänen, became the vice chairman of the Radical People's Party. Early SKSL member Ensio Uoti was a presidential candidate in 1956 elections. He gained some support and was endorsed by Yleisö newspaper. Member of the board of the party Heikki Waris later became Minister of Social Affairs in the Von Fieandt Cabinet in 1957. Ruutu himself became the head of the National Board of Education after the war.

The modern Strasserist current has been represented in Finland by a group called Musta Sydän (Black Heart) led by Ali Kaurila. The group was allegedly behind a stabbing attack on left-wing activists. Musta Sydän has also organized neo-Nazi Hardcore concerts attended by bands from Germany and Italy on the anniversary of the Kristallnacht in Turku.

=== In post-war Germany ===
Flag of the Black Front, which is commonly used by Strasserists

In the immediate post-war period and throughout the "long 1950s," Strasserist ideas provided a crucial framework for far-right groups navigating the new political landscape of West Germany. In a climate where overt Nazism was legally and socially unacceptable, Strasser's "Third Position" ideology, particularly his slogan "Neither Moscow nor Wall Street," offered a strategic veneer for nationalist and anti-liberal activities. Christoph Hendrik Müller argues that this rhetoric was frequently co-opted by figures with direct ties to the orthodox Nazi regime, who used its anti-capitalist and anti-Western positions to attack the Federal Republic's democratic foundations without openly invoking the Nazi past. This early post-war adoption of Strasserism as a "legitimizing mask" laid the groundwork for its more visible re-emergence in later decades.

During the 1970s, the ideas of Strasserism began to be mentioned more in European far-right groups as younger members with no ties to Hitler and a stronger sense of economic antisemitism came to the fore. Strasserite thought in Germany began to emerge as a tendency within the National Democratic Party of Germany (NPD) during the late 1960s. These Strasserites played a leading role in securing the removal of Adolf von Thadden from the leadership and after his departure the party became stronger in condemning Hitler for what it saw as his move away from socialism in order to court business and army leaders.

Although initially adopted by the NPD, Strasserism soon became associated with more peripheral extremist figures, notably Michael Kühnen, who produced a 1982 pamphlet Farewell to Hitler which included a strong endorsement of the idea. The People's Socialist Movement of Germany/Labour Party, a minor extremist movement that was outlawed in 1982, adopted the policy. Its successor movement, the Nationalist Front, did likewise, with its ten-point programme calling for an "anti-materialist cultural revolution" and an "anti-capitalist social revolution" to underline its support for the idea. The Free German Workers' Party also moved towards these ideas under the leadership of Friedhelm Busse in the late 1980s.

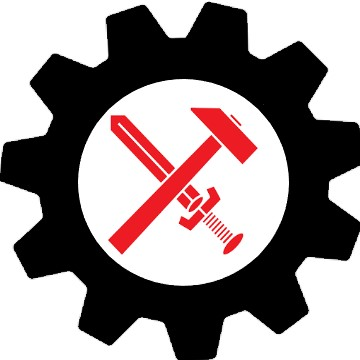
Emblem of the Free South Network, used in its rallies and demonstrations

The flag of the Strasserite movement Black Front and its symbol of a crossed hammer and a sword has been used by German and other European neo-Nazis abroad as a substitute for the more infamous Nazi flag which is banned in some countries such as Germany.

=== In the United Kingdom ===
Strasserism emerged in the United Kingdom in the early 1970s and centred on the National Front (NF) publication Britain First, the main writers of which were David McCalden, Richard Lawson and Denis Pirie. Opposing the leadership of John Tyndall, they formed an alliance with John Kingsley Read and ultimately followed him into the National Party (NP). The NP called for British workers to seize the right to work and offered a fairly Strasserite economic policy. Nonetheless, the NP was short-lived. Due in part to Read's lack of enthusiasm for Strasserism, the main exponents of the idea drifted away.

The idea was reintroduced to the NF by Andrew Brons in the early 1980s when he decided to make the party's ideology clearer. However, Strasserism was soon to become the province of the radicals in the Official National Front, with Richard Lawson brought in a behind-the-scenes role to help direct policy. This Political Soldier wing ultimately opted for the indigenous alternative of distributism, but their strong anti-capitalist rhetoric as well as that of their International Third Position successor demonstrated influences from Strasserism. From this background emerged Troy Southgate, whose own ideology and those of related groups such as the English Nationalist Movement and National Revolutionary Faction were influenced by Strasserism.

=== Elsewhere ===
Logo of Polish Partia Narodowych Socjalistów

Third Position groups, whose inspiration is generally more Italian in derivation, have often looked to Strasserism, owing to their strong opposition to capitalism based on economic antisemitic grounds. This was noted in France, where the student group Groupe Union Défense and the more recent Renouveau français both extolled Strasserite economic platforms.

In the United States, Tom Metzger, a white supremacist, had some affiliation to Strasserism, having been influenced by Kühnen's pamphlet. Also in the United States, Matthew Heimbach of the former Traditionalist Worker Party identifies as a Strasserist. Heimbach often engages primarily in anti-capitalist rhetoric during public speeches instead of overt antisemitism, anti-Masonry or anti-communist rhetoric. Heimbach was expelled from the National Socialist Movement due to his economic views being seen by the group as too left-wing. Heimbach stated that the NSM "essentially want it to remain a politically impotent white supremacist gang".

== See also ==
- Beefsteak Nazi – Communists and socialists who joined the Nazi Party
- Endokomuna – Ethnonationalist strain of communism in the Polish People's Republic
- Fascist syndicalism – Italian trade syndicate movement
- National-anarchism – Radical right-wing nationalist ideology
- National Bolshevism – Syncretic political ideology
- Nazi-Maoism – Syncretic political ideology
- Sorelianism – Advocacy for the ideas of Georges Sorel
- Solidarism
- Strasser crisis
- Intransigent fascism
- Village industries, Henry Ford's rural industrial decentralization project – Former rural factories in Michigan, United States
