= Otto Strasser =

German politician (1897–1974)

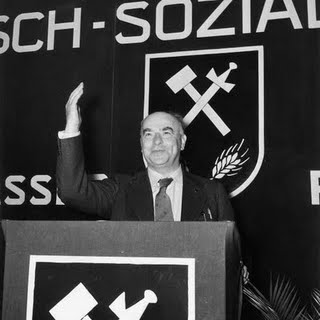
- Strasser delivering a speech soon after his return to West Germany following World War II

Personal details
- Born: Otto Johann Maximilian Strasser; 10 September 1897 Bad Windsheim, Bavaria, German Empire
- Died: 27 August 1974 (aged 76) Munich, Bavaria, West Germany
- Party: SPD (1917–1920); DVFP (1922–1925); NSDAP (1925–1930); KGRNS (1930–1934); DSU (1956–1962)
- Relatives: Gregor Strasser (brother); Bernhard Strasser (brother)
- Education: Humboldt University of Berlin
- Occupation: Philosopher, editor, politician

Military service
- Allegiance: German Empire
- Branch/service: Bavarian Army; Freikorps
- Years of service: 1914–1919
- Rank: Lieutenant
- Battles/wars: World War I

Otto Johann Maximilian Strasser (German: Otto Straßer; 10 September 1897 – 27 August 1974) was a German politician and an early member of the Nazi Party. While his older brother Gregor led the party's northern group, Otto served as its primary theoretician. Through their main publishing house, the Kampfverlag, they promoted an ideology based on Nazism, that later became known as Strasserism, which sought to replace capitalist private property with a medieval-style system of "hereditary fiefs" (Erblehen). Otto broke from the party due to disputes with the dominant Hitlerite faction. He formed the Black Front, a group intended to split the Nazi Party and take it from the grasp of Hitler. During his exile and World War II, this group also functioned as a secret opposition group.

Historian Hans Mommsen has commented that Otto Strasser was "in most respects" the intellectual superior of his brother Gregor. Peter Stachura argues that the concept of so-called left-wing "Strasserism," and Gregor's image as a principled "socialist" martyr, were largely fabricated by Otto in his writings.

== Life and career ==
=== Early life and World War I ===
Born at Bad Windsheim, Strasser was the son of a Catholic judicial officer who lived in the Upper Bavarian market town of Geisenfeld. Strasser took an active part in World War I (1914–1918). On 2 August 1914, he joined the Bavarian Army as a volunteer. He rose through the ranks to lieutenant and was twice wounded.

=== Freikorps and SPD (1919–1920) ===
Strasser returned to Germany in 1919, where he served in the Freikorps that in May 1919 put down the Bavarian Soviet Republic, which was organized on the principles of workers' councils. About this time, he joined the Social Democratic Party.

According to his own later accounts, he participated in the opposition to the Kapp Putsch in 1920. During this same period, Strasser was also actively associated with the right-wing Juniklub (June Club). Working alongside conservative revolutionary ideologue Arthur Moeller van den Bruck, Strasser became a regular contributor to the club's nationalist weekly Das Gewissen (The Conscience), a group that notably sympathized with the Kapp Putsch. Still, he allegedly grew increasingly alienated from his party's reformist stance, particularly when it put down a workers' uprising in the Ruhr, and he left the party later that year.

Strasser received his doctorate in political science from the University of Würzburg in 1921. He then joined the Reich Ministry of Food and Agriculture in Berlin as an assistant advisor, where he worked until 1923 before moving into the private sector. Leveraging his World War I connections, he was hired by his former platoon leader, Count von Hertling, who directed the large spirits conglomerate Hünlich-Winkelhausen. Strasser shortly advanced to become the director of the company's Saxony branch and eventually served as the Count's right-hand man in Berlin. He became active in nationalist movements, publishing several political articles under the pseudonym "Ulrich von Hutten".

=== Nazi Party (1925–1930) ===
In 1925, he joined the National Socialist German Workers' Party (NSDAP), in which his brother, Gregor, had been a member for several years and worked for its newspaper as a journalist, ultimately taking it over with his brother. He focused particularly on the "socialist" elements of the party's program and led the party's faction in northern Germany together with his brother and Joseph Goebbels. His faction advocated support for ideologically Nazi unions, profit-sharing (workers receiving 10% of shares) and what was later characterized as an advocacy for closer ties with the Soviet Union, though this "pro-soviet" claim has been disputed by Reinhard Kühnl.

Their 1925–1926 "Strasser Program" advocated for the breakup of large agricultural estates into redistributed "hereditary fiefs" (Erblehen). On foreign policy, it also advocated for a "Greater German Reich" including Austria, the creation of a Central African colonial empire, and the formation of a "United States of Europe." The draft contained a detailed section on the "Jewish Question," which called for the expulsion of Jewish immigrants and the stripping of citizenship from all German Jews. Under this proposed system, German Jews were to be reclassified as foreigners ("Palestinians").

His idea of "state feudalism" revolved around establishing a "de-proletarianized," agrarian society composed of fiefs and guilds. Under this system, agricultural land would be granted by the state as family possession for independent (unaided) cultivation and passed on only to male heirs. Political power was to be exercised through a system of corporate estates (Stände) ruled by a cultivated elite, rather than parliamentary democracy. To achieve this vision, he advocated for relocating urban populations to the countryside (de-urbanization), dismantling heavy industry into small, decentralized structures, and phasing out international finance in favour of a barter economy, while encouraging domestic private banks and allowing interest on unsecured loans.

Throughout the late 1920s, Otto authored numerous articles and speeches that were published under Gregor's name. This practice utilized Gregor's parliamentary immunity to shield Otto from prosecution, though it consequently subjected Gregor to a series of libel lawsuits.

According to his former associates, although Strasser particularly showed opposition to "Ultramontanism" in the 1920s, he had already joked at the time that he was willing to use religion, claiming that he would return to the "bosom of the Holy Roman Church" if politically necessary, adding: "they will take me, those cowl-pissers" (Kuttenbrunzer).

Despite disagreements with Hitler, the Strassers did not represent a radical wing opposed to the party mainstream. Regarding finance, Gottfried Feder was more radical and held great favour at the time. The Strassers were extremely influential within the party, but the Strasserist program was defeated at the Bamberg Conference of 1926. Otto Strasser, along with Gregor, continued as a leaning Left Nazi within the party until he seceded from the NSDAP in 1930 following an aggressive attack led by Joseph Goebbels at a General Assembly on June 30, resulting in his expulsion from the meeting. This 1930 split also ended his political relationship with his brother.

=== Nazi dissident in Germany (1930–1933) ===
On 1 July, Strasser telegraphed Hitler requesting an explanation for Goebbels' actions. None would come. Strasser then seceded from the Nazi Party to form the Action Group of Revolutionary National Socialists, which later transformed into the Black Front, composed of like-minded former NSDAP membership. The group was intended to split the Nazi Party and operate as a dissident faction against Hitler's leadership.

Gregor Strasser publicly condemned Otto's secession as "pure madness" and accused Otto of treating the party in a "treacherous way".

Otto Strasser later described his break with Hitler in a highly dramatic way, portraying it as a profound ideological conflict. He depicted Hitler as a "Roman Catholic fascist" dictator and himself as a principled German Protestant philosopher, quoting Martin Luther, claiming that he insisted on "ideas" above "leaders." He rejected the "marvels of technology" touted by Hitler, and said "I had to deny the so-called progress of mankind to begin with, because I was unable to regard the invention of the toilet as a work of culture."

Shortly after his exit, Strasser unknowingly confided to an undercover police informer that while the NSDAP "was no longer revolutionary," he still considered Hitler's antisemitism to be sincere and it was politically "extraordinarily effective."

Otto Strasser then published his "Fourteen Theses" in 1930. The program proposed the state's "supreme ownership" (Obereigentum) over land and resources, reorganizing proprietors into the status of "fief-holders" (Lehensträger) It also declared a historical mission to "overthrow the worldview of the Great French Revolution," affirming human inequality and seeking a strong central power based on the "personal responsibility of the leaders" in place of the "irresponsibility of an anonymous mass." On foreign policy, it demanded Germany to act as the "backbone and heart of white Europe," embracing war as the "will of destiny" to secure "living space" (Lebensraum). The theses pledged to protect the "German soul" from "racial degeneration" and "supra-national forces" such as "Jewry" and Ultramontanism, demanding a new legal system that would recognize only ethnic Germans (Volksgenossen) as citizens.

To build his new movement, Strasser allied with military figures like Major Bruno Buchrucker, whom Strasser would later call his "best friend", an avowed monarchist known for his brutal suppression of the 1920 Kapp Putsch workers' strike, and who considered ideological programs "inessential." Despite this, Strasser entrusted Buchrucker with formulating the group's "Programmatic Principles" for its first congress, which largely corresponded to earlier publications by Strasser.

The Black Front's most significant attempt to destabilize Hitler came in 1931, when they supported the Stennes revolt, a major mutiny by the Berlin SA led by Walther Stennes. According to Strasser, during this power struggle, Stennes provided him with private letters exposing SA leader Ernst Röhm's homosexuality. These letters were subsequently leaked to the Berlin police, creating a massive public scandal designed to severely damage Röhm and the Nazi Party's reputation. Following the revolt, several hundred expelled SA members joined Strasser, and the groups briefly merged.

In May 1931, Freikorps veteran Hermann Ehrhardt initiated the merger of Stennes's faction and Strasser's group into the "German Nationalist and Socialist Fighting Association" (NSKD). Ehrhardt was acting as a government agent and secretly channeled state resources into the NSKD to consolidate paramilitary opposition against Hitler.

In Strasser's later memoirs, he claimed that their efforts to split the SA were financed by wealthy industrialists, most notably the steel magnate Otto Wolff. Strasser wrote that he used this "seemingly heaven-sent" funding to actively bribe SA members to abandon Hitler, offering them "more money than Hitler had offered".

Despite heavy financial investment, the Black Front's impact was minimal. The Stennes rebellion quickly collapsed following Hitler's personal intervention, and Strasser's faction only managed to attract a very small number of defectors. As historian Robert Gellately notes, Strasser took "remarkably few prominent members with them, no district leaders or members of the Reichstag," and his opposition "quickly faded to insignificance." Ultimately, his departure did little to alter the Nazi Party's course, which continued its appropriation of socialist-sounding rhetoric.

His party proved unable to counter Hitler's rise to power in 1933, and Strasser spent the years of the Nazi era in exile. The Strasserists were annihilated during the Night of the Long Knives in 1934. This left Hitler as the undisputed party leader; the Nazi leadership pacified the industrialists and military elite by eliminating Ernst Röhm and the SA leadership, and took the opportunity to purge former internal rivals like Gregor Strasser, who had previously engaged in political negotiations with Kurt von Schleicher.

=== Exile (1933–1955) ===
In addition to the Black Front, Strasser at this time headed the Free German Movement outside Germany; this group (founded in 1941) sought to enlist the aid of Germans throughout the world in bringing about the downfall of Hitler and his vision of Nazism.

Strasser fled first to Austria, then to Czechoslovakia (Prague), Switzerland, and France. During his time in Czechoslovakia, Strasser was utilized by British intelligence to operate a black propaganda radio station. This operation used Strasser's identity as a former Nazi insider to disseminate damaging rumours against the regime. Historian Ian Kershaw dismissed Strasser’s claims regarding Hitler’s deviant sexual practices as the "fanciful" fabrications of "an out-and-out political enemy."

In January 1935, for security reasons, Strasser sent his pregnant wife and their three-year-old daughter to Samos, where their son, Gregor Peter Demosthenes, was born in May. In a telegram to Hitler, Strasser referred to his newborn son as "Gregor II."

In 1940, he went to Bermuda by way of Portugal, leaving a wife and two children behind in Switzerland. In the same year, the Austrian Jewish refugee writer Willi Frischauer issued a public warning against Strasser's movement. In his book The Nazis at War (1940), Frischauer revealed that the Black Front was financing its activities by selling bonds that promised redemption after the movement seized power in Germany. Frischauer reported that these funding bonds were segregated into two categories: Series "A" was sold exclusively to "Aryans," while Series "J" was sold exclusively to Jews.

In Bermuda, local observers noted he retained militaristic German mannerisms; archival notes describe him as a "typical German, blue-eyed, blond, stocky," who would "bow from the waist and click his heels at the slightest provocation." Even as a refugee, Strasser continued to comment on the conflict, claiming that Hitler had made a strategic error by not attacking Great Britain sooner, which Strasser attributed to Hitler being "mentally unable to depart from his well-tried plan of dealing with the weakest first." In December 1940, Strasser had an encounter with the famous English author H.G. Wells, who was stranded in Bermuda due to bad weather. Intrigued by the dissident, Wells arranged an interview to discuss the post-war order. The meeting resulted in a spectacular clash of worldviews. Wells advocated for a rational, secular "order of science" devoid of nationalism and religion, a concept Strasser rejected, citing his Catholicism. During the interview Strasser shouted "Heil Germany!" repeatedly. The encounter left Wells deeply alarmed by the leniency shown to the exile. In an article published in January 1942, Wells publicly denounced both living Strasser brothers as "blood-stained-Nazis." He described Otto as a "quite insanely anti-Bolshevik and soaked to the marrow with the idea of the German people being first and foremost in Europe and the world." Wells publicly demanded to know why officials in the United Kingdom and Canada actively "petted and encouraged" Strasser rather than throwing him in a concentration camp.

In 1941, he emigrated to Canada. He spent the latter part of the war in relative isolation and financial difficulty. In 1942, he lived for a time in Clarence, Nova Scotia, on a farm owned by a German-Czech, Adolph Schmidt, then moved to nearby Paradise, where he lived for more than a decade in a rented apartment above a general store. He at times relied on support from his brother, Bernhard Paul Strasser, a Benedictine monk living in the United States. Bernhard himself was spreading anti-Jewish propaganda, characterizing a rival anti-Nazi "Free German Movement" based in New York as a conspiracy established "by Communists and Jews" specifically directed against his brother.

In the same year, elements of the Black Front contributed to the foundation of the Free German Movement, an organization modeled on "Free France" and based largely in Latin America. The movement officially called for a democratic constitution, federalism, regional autonomy, and "God-fearing" policies, uniting a mix of Christian, national-conservative, and social democratic exiles whose only shared stance was anti-communism. He tried to impose himself as the sole authority in the movement, but the organization was far too heterogeneous for such an approach to work.

As Strasser marketed his utility to the Allied powers, he encountered increasing distrust. The Soviet Union despised his strong anti-Bolshevism, and the Americans were never convinced of his value. Although the British and Canadian governments briefly considered utilizing him as a potential leader for an underground intelligence network, initially taking his claims of a powerful Black Front seriously, these claims were soon exposed as exaggerated. There is little evidence indicating that the Black Front maintained any significant wartime presence in Germany. Ultimately, due to concerns regarding his sympathy for Nazism, extreme anti-communism, and his lack of verifiable influence, the Allied officials abandoned their hope of establishing a political partnership with him.

During his exile, he wrote articles on Nazi Germany and its leadership for several British, American, and Canadian newspapers, including the New Statesman, and a series for the Montreal Gazette, which was ghostwritten by then-Gazette reporter and later politician Donald C. MacDonald.

Despite his isolation in Canada, Strasser maintained active contact with nationalist groups in West Germany. Strasser forwarded a character assessment produced by a Frankfurt clairvoyant and graphologist to his West German headquarters, privately noting to his deputy Kurt Sprengel that the document would have a positive psychological effect on their supporters.

In early 1949, American journalist Bill Downs reported on the emergence of several new right-wing, anti-communist nationalist groups in Germany, which local socialists alleged were a front for the revival of Strasser's "Black Front." In the same report, Downs noted a claim that Strasser's movement had already secured pledged subscriptions totaling one million marks, primarily from German industrialists.

According to a 1950 report based on his own statements, Otto Strasser positioned himself as being opposed to forming alliances with either the Eastern or Western blocs. He claimed to have rejected an invitation to join East Germany's "National Front," hoping that he would be permitted to return to Bavaria, which had been under US occupation until 1949. In his view, West Germany constituted an American colony and East Germany a Russian colony.

Strasser modified his doctrine into "Solidarism" (Solidarismus), framing it as aligned with Catholic social teaching. Historian Christoph Hendrik Müller describes this revised ideology as "an attempt to incorporate the workers and the state into the capitalist mode of production." On a global level, Strasser called for the establishment of three "White and Christian federations"—the Confederation of Europe, the British Commonwealth, and the Pan-American Union.

Strasser's public posturing did not prevent divisions among his few remaining followers. Veterans of the "Cologne Group," who had endured years in Nazi concentration camps for their Black Front ties, openly revolted against Strasser and his deputy Kurt Sprengel, accusing Strasser of suppressing them and abandoning their original ideals. A feud subsequently erupted between his long-time deputy, Bruno Fricke, the son of a Berlin banker who favoured an Eastern orientation, and Waldemar Wadsack, an economist who led the pro-Western faction. As a former bank manager from Breslau, Wadsack had been tortured by the SA, stripped of his property, and had spent nearly seven years in prisons and concentration camps for high treason while waiting for Strasser's return. Despite this loyalty, Strasser used Wadsack primarily as a pawn to suppress the rebellious Cologne Group, privately mocking both Wadsack and Sprengel as outmatched "zeroes" (Nullen). As the factional infighting worsened, Wadsack actively undermined his rival, writing to Strasser to dismiss Fricke as a "selfish wannabe" and urging stricter action against him. The conflict culminated in 1951 with Fricke's departure; he broke with Strasser and accused his former leader of abandoning ideals for "business politics for the sake of earning a living" (Geschäftspolitik zum "Brotwerb").

=== Return to Germany and later career (1955–1974) ===
Strasser eventually gained West German citizenship, returned to Germany on 16 March 1955, and settled in Munich.

He made several unsuccessful attempts to revive his political career. In 1956, he attempted to create a new "nationalist and socialist"-oriented party, the German Social Union (German: Deutsch-Soziale Union). Among his other projects was an effort to found a "Catholic People's Party" (katholische Volkspartei) with the help of his brother Bernhard. His organizations were unable to attract any meaningful support. Strasser continued to advocate for his vision of Nazism until he died in Munich in 1974.

== Post-war writings and historical reliability ==
In the post-war era, Otto Strasser published memoirs that modern historians would dismiss as unreliable. Historian Peter D. Stachura categorized his writings as "unashamed eulogies" riddled with factual errors, designed to create a false narrative of his brother Gregor as a "socialist" martyr, despite Gregor ultimately moving closer to the conservatives, while exaggerating Otto's own political significance as a principled alternative to Hitler. This lifelong attempt to distort history included fabricating events entirely, such as a nonexistent 1920 meeting between Gregor, Hitler, and Erich Ludendorff. Historians conclude that Otto's post-war accounts must be treated with extreme skepticism as political rhetoric aimed at exaggerating his political influence, rather than objective historical records.

== Ideology ==
Strasser's view of reality where abstract ideals are placed above the material and social spheres, has been described by historian Christoph Hendrik Müller as "German Idealism in its crudest form." In Strasser's framework, the abstract "idea" of the nation is considered the superior historical force that overrides the concrete economic or social interests of class. This explains why Strasser believed parliament could be relegated to only administrative tasks concerning the economy; in his view, the truly important questions of national destiny were not matters of political compromise but of metaphysical principle. By insulating these "sacrosanct" issues from democratic processes, his system aimed to protect the nation's perceived eternal essence from the fluctuations of popular opinion.

== Publications ==
- Strasser, Otto (1921). Entwicklung und Bedeutung der deutschen Zuckerrübensamenzucht (in German). p. 92. OCLC 216126812. Dissertation Würzburg.
- Blank, Herbert; Buchrucker, Bruno Ernst; Schultze-Pfaelzer, Gerhard; Strasser, Otto (1931). Wir suchen Deutschland. Ein freier Disput über die Zeitkrisis zwischen Gerhard Schultze-Pfaelzer und Otto Strasser, Major Buchrucker, Herbert Blank (in German). p. 195. OCLC 560330578.
- Strasser, Otto; von Miltenberg, Weigand (1932). Aufbau des deutschen Sozialismus. Bücher der Zielgebung (in German) (1-5 ed.). Leipzig: Wolfgang Richard Lindner Verlag (W. R. Lindner). p. 101. OCLC 72217664.
  - Strasser, Otto (1936). Aufbau des deutschen Sozialismus als Anlage d. histor. Gespräch Hitlers mit Dr. Straßer [Anlaß d. Trennung] [Construction of German Socialism] (in German) (2nd ed.). Prague: Grunov. p. 152. OCLC 245703335.
- Geismeier, Michael (1933). Gregor Straßer (Gregor Strasser). Männer und Mächte (in German). Leipzig: R. Kittler. p. 94. OCLC 163008925. Michael Geismeier is a pseudonym of Otto Strasser.
- Strasser, Otto (1935). Die deutsche Bartholomäusnacht (in German). Zurich: Reso. p. 241. OCLC 3047552.
- Strasser, Otto (1936). Europäische Föderation. Kulturpolitische Schriften, Heft 6 (in German). Zurich: Reso-Verlag AG. p. 32. OCLC 40811575.
- Strasser, Otto (1937). Wohin treibt Hitler? Darstellung der Lage und Entwicklung des Hitlersystems in den Jahren 1935 und 1936 [Whither Hitler?] (in German). Prague: Verlag Heinrich Grunov. p. 82. OCLC 1395066622.
- Strasser, Otto (1937). Hitler tritt auf der Stelle. Die dritte Front, H. 6 (in German). Prague: Grunov. p. 32. OCLC 72770670.
- Strasser, Otto (1937). Kommt es zum Krieg?. Die dritte Front, H. 3 (in German). Prague: Grunov. p. 15. OCLC 72770672.
- Strasser, Otto (1939). Europa von Morgen : das Ziel Masaryks (in German). Zurich: Weltwoche Verlag. p. 284. OCLC 6821708.
- Strasser, Otto (1940). Hitler and I. Translated by Mosbacher, Eric; David, Gwenda. London: Jonathan Cape. p. 240. OCLC 503756997. Other versions: Hitler et moi, and Hitler und Ich. Asmus-Bücher, Band 9. Johannes-Asmus-Verlag, Konstanz 1948, 263 pages. Also 1940, Boston: MA, Houghton Mifflin Company.
- Strasser, Otto (1941). Germany Tomorrow (4th ed.). London: Jonathan Cape. p. 254. OCLC 312705331.
- Strasser, Otto (1941). A History in My Time [Erlebte Weltgeschichte.] Translated by Reed, Douglas. London: Jonathan Cape. p. 262. OCLC 752976049.
- Strasser, Otto (1942). The Gangsters Around Hitler with a topical postscript "Nazi gangsters in South America". A Hurricane book. London: Allen. p. 63. OCLC 72650037.
- Reed, Douglas; Strasser, Otto (1953). The Prisoner of Ottawa: Otto Strasser. London: Jonathan Cape. OCLC 504698230.
- Strasser, Otto (1965). Der Faschismus. Geschichte und Gefahr. Politische Studien, Beiheft 3 (in German). Munich: Günter Olzog Verlag. p. 109. OCLC 901064063.
- Strasser, Otto; Alexandrov, Victor (1968). Le front noir contre Hitler (in French). Verviers (Belgium): Gérard et Cie, Bibliothèque Marabout n° 327, p. 305.
- Strasser, Otto (1969). Mein Kampf : [eine politische Autobiografie]. Streit-Zeit-Bücher, Band 3 (in German). Frankfurt: Heinrich Heine Verlag. p. 234. OCLC 165470359.

== See also ==
- The European magazine
