= Kampfverlag =

The Kampfverlag (official name: Kampfverlag GmbH; "Struggle-Publisher") was a German publishing house that existed from 1926 to 1930. The publishing house gained particular importance as the journalistic mouthpiece of the wing of the NSDAP around the brothers Gregor and Otto Strasser.

== History ==
The beginnings of Kampfverlag go back to the year 1925: At that time, the pharmacist Gregor Strasser, who had been running a drugstore in Landshut since 1920 and had been a member of the Landtag of Bavaria and the Reichstag since 1924, decided to pursue his civil profession – which he had been doing for years had severely neglected his political engagement – to finally give up in favor of a job as a full-time politician. Together with his brother Otto and the Pomeranian Gauleiter Theodor Vahlen, who had joined the NSDAP in the course of 1925, Strasser decided to set up a National Socialist publishing house that would support the expansion of the party to areas outside of Bavaria, especially northern Germany, should give journalistic support. In contrast to the actual in-house publishing house of the NSDAP, the Franz-Eher-Verlag, the new publishing house was to put a clearer accent on socialist positions and address the urban working class in particular.

The Strasser brothers took the first step on the way to their own publishing house with the publication of the Nationalsozialistischen Briefe starting in the autumn of 1925. The Kampfverlag was founded on 1 March 1926. The publishing house was based near Berlin. The name was influenced by the Nazi idea of the conflict between the "movement" on the one hand and the existing state on the other for political power. In the years that followed, the publisher bought a number of existing newspapers in quick succession and brought them onto the Strasserist line. In addition to the Strasser brothers, Hans Hinkel held a one-third stake in the publishing house and temporarily acted as editor. According to Otto Strasser, the publishing house had eleven weekly newspapers in its program in 1926 and later three daily newspapers. A total of eight newspapers and magazines were published by the publishing house. In addition, there were individual book publications as well as countless brochures, leaflets, advertising leaflets and other comparable media for political advertising work. The brothers brought the tendency of their publications to the formula in which they proclaimed the mouthpiece of a socialism that was "equally hostile to Western capitalism and Eastern Bolshevism".

The costs for founding the publishing house were covered by loans and guarantees, which the founders took out from friends of political sympathy: The industrialist Bruck contributed a loan of 4,000 RM to found the Kampfverlag. Among other things, the profits made from the sale of the Strasser's drugstore served as a guarantee. Since the drugstore had been acquired from Strasser's wife Else's dowry, she was de jure a co-owner of the publishing house. After working for almost two years, Kampfverlag was in the green from 1928. Since the drugstore had been acquired from Strasser's wife Else's dowry, she was de jure a co-owner of the publishing house. After working for almost two years, Kampfverlag was in the green from 1928. While Gregor Strasser took on the duties of editor and – following his childhood dream of becoming a journalist – contributed numerous articles, Otto Strasser was the editor-in-chief of the Strassersche Zeitungen. Other employees of the Kampfverlags newspapers included Hans Hinkel, Walther Darré and the draftsman Hans Schweitzer.

Within the NSDAP, the journalistic activities of the Kampfverlag and in particular the extensive independence that the Strasser brothers developed in this way from the Munich party leadership, led to various conflicts: On the one hand, there were tensions with Max Amann and the leadership of the Eher-Verlag, who were displeased with the loss of their monopoly over the Nazi press and journalism. More importantly, however, the publisher's activity deepened the rift between Gregor Strasser and his one-time follower Joseph Goebbels, which had begun in 1925 and developed into an outspoken personal enmity by the early 1930s. Goebbels was particularly angry that the Strasser brothers opposed his claim to control all Nazi publications published in Berlin as Gauleiter of Berlin and that they competed with his house newspaper, Der Angriff.

In the background, the relative independence of Kampfverlag led to ever new conflicts between the Strasser brothers and Hitler, which reached their culmination point in the spring of 1930: while Gregor Strasser was ready to switch to Hitler's line and henceforth concentrated on his work as Reichsorganisationsleiter, i.e. as head of the party apparatus the NSDAP, Otto Strasser preferred to turn his back on the Hitler movement and go his own way by founding the Combat League of Revolutionary National Socialists. On 4 July 1930, depending on the reading, he left the party or was expelled from it. Previously he had on 21 and 22 May 1930 rejected an offer to buy Kampfverlag for 120,000 RM. Instead, Kampfverlag was wound up during the summer of 1930 and closed on 1 October 1930.

=== Aftermath ===
Otto Strasser saved a newspaper from the bankruptcy of the Kampfverlag to his new publishing house Der Nationale Sozialist, which he published from then on as a political weekly under the title Die Deutsche Revolution. In the summer of 1931, Strasserverlag was renamed Die Schwarze Front, based on the name of the political group around Otto Strasser, which published a newspaper of the same name from 6 September 1931. Until he emigrated in the spring of 1933, he used this newspaper primarily as a platform for violent attacks on Hitler and the NSDAP in domestic political struggles. After Strasser's flight from Germany in the spring of 1933, this organ, which he now published from Prague under the title Die Deutsche Revolution aus Prag, formed the cornerstone and main mouthpiece of his private war against the Nazi state from exile.

== List of newspapers published by the Kampfverlag ==
- Berliner Arbeiterzeitung
- Die Faust
- Die Flamme
- Der nationale Sozialist für die Ostmark
- Der nationale Sozialist für Mitteldeutschland
- Der nationale Sozialist für Norddeutschland
- Der nationale Sozialist für Westdeutschland
- Der nationale Sozialist für Rhein und Ruhr
- Der nationale Sozialist für Sachsen (later Sächsischer Beobachter)

== List of the books and pamphlets published by the Kampfverlag ==
- Bruno Ernst Buchrucker: Im Schatten Seeckt's. Die Geschichte der Schwarzen Reichswehr, 1928.
- Gregor Strasser: Das Hitler-Büchlein, 1930

== Bibliography ==
- Udo Kissenkoetter: Straßer und die NSDAP, 1978 ISBN 3-421-01881-2
