= French Renewal =

French Renewal Renouveau français
- Founded: November 2005
- Dissolved: spring 2017
- Membership: Hundreds
- Ideology: French nationalism Monarchism; Euroscepticism; Anti-Zionism; Anti-communism; Anti-Masonry; Corporate nationalism Strasserism
- Political position: Far-right
- Religion: Christianity (Catholicism)
- European affiliation: European National Front
- National Assembly: 0 / 577
- Senate: 0 / 348
- European Parliament: 0 / 74

Party flag

Website
- https://renouveau-francais.com/

French Renewal (French: Renouveau français) was a French far-right, nationalist political party affiliated with the European National Front, founded in November 2005.

Renouveau français politically defined itself as nationalist, Catholic and "counterrevolutionary"—in this case, reactionary opposition to the principles of the French Revolution of 1789. Nevertheless, the organisation had a tricolour logo and claims to defend the "French nation".

== Organisation ==
Renouveau français described itself as a "structure for reflection, formation and information, outside the electoralist framework, independent from all political formations and from all cleavages".

Renouveau français was coordinated by a directorial committee and had regional branches in Île-de-France, Brittany, Anjou, Normandy, Vendée, Toulouse and Alsace. They claimed several hundred members and "thousands" of sympathisers.

== Doctrine ==
Renouveau français described itself as "nationalist", defining the notion as "defence of vital interests of France and the French, without any hatred".

Renouveau français was monarchist and rejected freemasonry and lobbyist organizations, as well as Marxism and classical liberalism. The organisation claimed to be the heir of Charles Maurras, Édouard Drumont, Maurice Barrès, Jacques Ploncard d'Assac and Henry Coston. Their site hosted editorials from veterans of the Organisation armée secrète (OAS).

Flag used from 2016. The local branches of the organization had their own flags.

== Electoral stance ==
Renouveau français claimed to be "off the left/right cleavage", a common claim of French nationalism. In 2007, however, Renouveau français encouraged its sympathisers to vote for "no other candidate than Jean-Marie Le Pen." Le Pen was described as "the only credible representative of the patriotic trend". Still, Renouveau français warned against the "parliamentary system", and the "fundamentally Masonic, secular, and cosmopolitan Republic".
