= Bernhard Strasser =

German Benedictine monk and author

The Reverend Bernhard Strasser OSB
- Born: Paul Strasser; 21 March 1895; Windsheim, Kingdom of Bavaria, German Empire
- Died: 11 May 1981 (aged 86); Norfolk, Nebraska, U.S.
- Education: Ludwig-Maximilians-Universität München; University of Würzburg
- Occupations: Benedictine monk, author, chaplain, teacher
- Employer(s): Metten Abbey; Saint John's Abbey, Collegeville, Minnesota
- Known for: Memoirs on early Nazi Party history
- Relatives: Gregor Strasser (brother); Otto Strasser (brother)

Bernhard Strasser (born Paul Strasser; 21 March 1895 – 11 May 1981) was a German Catholic priest, Benedictine monk, and author. A member of the Metten Abbey in Bavaria, he is historically significant primarily as the brother of the politicians Gregor Strasser and Otto Strasser, key figures in the early Nazi Party who led its paramilitary and "left-wing" factions.

Targeted by the Nazi regime due to his family connections following the Night of the Long Knives (1934), Strasser fled Germany in 1935 to escape arrest by the Gestapo. He was subsequently classified as an enemy of the state and placed on "The Black Book" (Sonderfahndungsliste G.B.), a list of prominent targets to be arrested by the SS in the event of a German invasion of Great Britain.

Strasser spent the latter half of his life in exile in the United States, where he served as a prominent member of the German-Catholic diaspora in Minnesota and Nebraska. His post-war writings, particularly his biographical works concerning his brothers, serve as important primary sources for historians researching the internal dynamics of the Nazi Party's rise and the political ideology of Strasserism.

== Life ==
Paul Strasser was the second of five children of the Bavarian state official Peter Strasser (1855–1928) and his wife Pauline Strobel (1873–1943). His siblings included the politicians Gregor Strasser (1892–1934) and Otto Strasser (1897–1974). After attending school, Paul Strasser participated in the World War I from 1915 to 1918.

After returning from the war, Strasser entered the Bavarian Benedictine Abbey of Metten in 1919 or 1920 and adopted the religious name Bernhard. In the following years, he studied Catholic theology at the Ludwig-Maximilians-Universität München and the University of Würzburg. After receiving his priestly ordination in 1923, he was assigned from 1924 onwards as a chaplain in the parishes administered by the monastery and as a prefect in the monastery's boarding school.

Bernhard Strasser participated only marginally, and mostly as an observer, in the political activities of his brothers Gregor and Otto, who were among the leading figures of the NSDAP until the early 1930s. However, as a contemporary witness, he later provided numerous details and assessments regarding potentially hidden views, actions, and political aspirations of his brothers. His memoirs—which are strongly colored by personal perspective and were previously sometimes used too uncritically—are therefore utilized by historians to research the early history of the NSDAP.

While Strasser's older brother Gregor was shot by SS men during the Night of the Long Knives in the early summer of 1934, and his younger brother Otto had gone into exile in May 1933 as the leader of the Black Front (which had been banned by Nazi authorities), Strasser himself fled Germany in July 1935. Prior to this, indications had mounted that the Gestapo was interested in him, although the exact reasons remained unclear. There are suspicions that the National Socialist mayor of Aufhausen, Franz Xaver Froschhammer, who was known to be anti-clerical, was involved in denunciations against Strasser.

After brief stays in Austria, Switzerland, and France, Strasser initially lived in a Benedictine abbey in Luxembourg. At the outbreak of the World War II, he went to France. Following the German occupation of France, Strasser fled to Portugal—after being briefly arrested in Le Havre as a suspected German spy. There, he helped his brother Otto, who was also in hiding in the country at the time, to find a hiding place in a monastery. From Portugal, Bernhard Strasser emigrated to the United States in the autumn of 1940.

Bernhard Strasser was classified as an important target by National Socialist police organs in the late 1930s. In the spring of 1940, the Reich Security Main Office in Berlin, which mistakenly believed him to be in United Kingdom, placed him on the Sonderfahndungsliste G.B. (Special Search List Great Britain). This was a list of persons who, in the event of a successful German invasion of Great Britain, were to be located and arrested with special priority by the special commandos of the SS-Einsatzgruppen.

In the United States, Strasser worked as a teacher at the Benedictine monastery of Saint John in Collegeville, Minnesota, until 1950. Subsequently, he served as a pastor in Primrose (1950–1963) and St. Henry's Church in Howell, Nebraska (1963–1968). From 1968 until his death, he was the resident chaplain at St. Joseph's Nursing Home in Norfolk, Nebraska.

In the early post-war period, Bernhard Strasser participated from the United States in the unsuccessful attempts of his brother Otto to establish a Catholic People's Party in West Germany. In Germany, Strasser published a memoir about his brothers. He also corresponded with prominent contemporary figures such as Heinrich Brüning and historians such as Udo Kissenkoetter.

== Bibliography ==
- Beichte gut! (Confess Well!). Metten Abbey, 1932.
- Gregor und Otto Straßer. Munich, 1954. (New edition 1965 as Gregor und Otto Strasser. Kurze Darstellung ihrer Persönlichkeit und ihres Wollens / Gregor and Otto Strasser. A Brief Presentation of their Personality and their Will).

== Sources ==
- Ein Leben im Schatten der Sippenhaft. P. Bernhard Strasser, der Bruder von Gregor Strasser, 70 Jahre alt (A Life in the Shadow of Kin Liability. Fr. Bernhard Strasser, the Brother of Gregor Strasser, 70 Years Old), in: Straubinger Tagblatt, March 21, 1965.
- Michael Kaufmann: Memento mori. Zum Gedenken an die verstorbenen Konventualen der Benediktinerabtei Metten seit der Wiedererrichtung 1830 (Memento Mori. In Memory of the Deceased Conventuals of Metten Benedictine Abbey since its Re-establishment in 1830) (= Developmental History of Metten Benedictine Abbey, Part V), Metten 2008, pp. 434f.
