= Paul Silverberg =

German industrialist

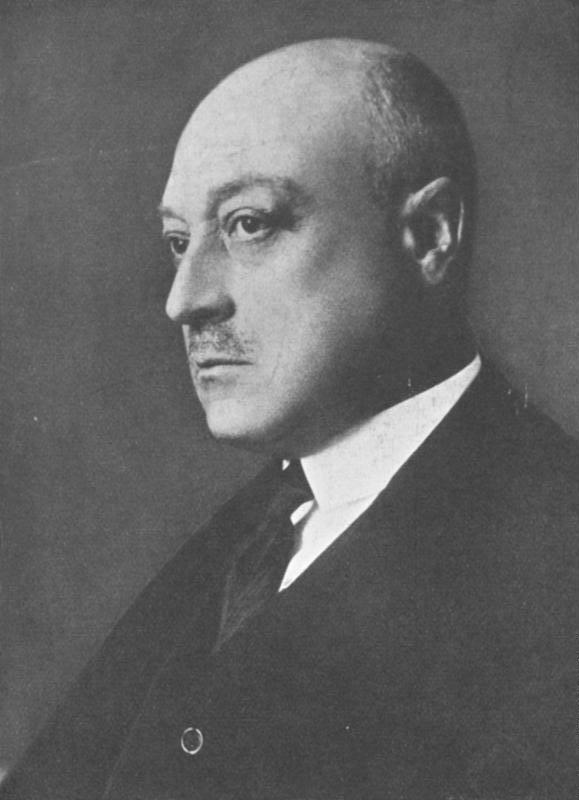
- Paul Silverberg, 1930
- Born: May 6, 1876; Bedburg, Germany
- Died: October 5, 1959 (aged 83); Lugano, Switzerland
- Occupation: Industrialist
- Organizations: Rheinische AG für Braunkohlenbergbau und Brikettfabrikation
- Known for: Leadership in the German brown coal industry

Paul Silverberg (6 May 1876 – 5 October 1959) was a leading German industrialist until the rise of the Nazis.

== Early life ==
Paul Silverberg was born in Bedburg on 6 May 1876, the second of four children and the only son of Adolf (1845-1903) and Theodora Silverberg (1853-1924), née Schönbrunn. His father came from a traditional Jewish family and was active in Bedburg as a textile and brown coal entrepreneur. Paul Silverberg was initially of the Jewish faith, but converted to Protestantism in 1895.

== Leading Industrialist ==
Paul Silverberg initially worked as a lawyer. In 1903, he became the General Director of Fortuna AG, a brown coal company controlled by his father, which later became the Rheinische AG (today Rheinbraun). In 1926 he joined the company's supervisory board. Applying a strategy of horizontal integration he took over two other Rhineland brown coal firms to create the Rheinische AG für Braunkohlenbergbau und Brikettfabrikation (RAG). He was said to have blocked the ambitions of Hugo Stinnes and August Thyssen. A leading industrial leader of Jewish origin during the Weimar Republic, in 1928 he sat on the supervisory board of twenty-five major German firms.

== Nazi persecution ==
After the Nazis came to power in Germany under Hitler in 1933, Silverberg was persecuted because of his Jewish heritage. His trust in his network of allies was shattered, as non-Jewish industrialist Friedrich Flick and Fritz Thyssen manuveured to deprive him of control. Obliged by Nazi anti-Jewish laws to withdraw from companies, associations, and organizations, his resistance was broken in 1933. Expelled from the Reich Association of German Industry (Reichsverband der Deutschen Industrie) on 29 March 1933, and forced to resign as president of the Cologne Chamber of Industry and Commerce on 5 April 1933 he left Germany for the Swiss town of Lugano in late 1933.

== Postwar ==
Despite Konrad Adenauer's requests and being awarded the honorary presidency of the Cologne Chamber of Commerce and Industry, he refused to return to Germany after 1945. Silverberg was a member of Gustav Stresemann's national liberal Deutsche Volkspartei. He died 5 October 1959 in Lugano.

== Publications ==
- Appeal, reason for appeal, increase and accrual in inheritance law of the civil code. M. DuMont Schauberg, Cöln 1992, OCLC 252986631 (Dissertation Rheinische Friedrich-Wilhelms-Universität Bonn, Faculty of Law, 12 May 1902, 71 pages).
- Georg Adolf Solmssen and Christian Eckert: How do we create work and bread for the German people? 3 lectures, given in Cologne on 1 March 1926 on the occasion of the general assembly of the Association of Banks and Bankers in Rhineland and Westphalia e. V. Walter de Gruyter, Berlin 1926, DNB 576448249.
- Georg Müller: Economic and social policy, tax and financial policy. Lectures given at the Extraordinary General Assembly of the Reich Association of German Industry on 12 December 1929 in Berlin (= publications of the Reich Association of German Industry, No. 50). Reich Association of German Industry, Berlin / Volckmar, Leipzig 1930, DNB 365001740.
- Gustav Cassel: The Collapse of the International Monetary System. Lecture at the Industrie-Club Düsseldorf, given on 26 October 1931 by Gustav Cassel, followed by Paul Silverberg's speech. Industry Club, Düsseldorf 1931, DNB 572588038.
- Franz Mariaux (Ed.): Speeches and writings. Cologne University Publishing House, Cologne 1951, DNB 454714165.

== Literature ==
- Werner Bührer: Silverberg, Paul. In: New German Biography (NDB). Volume 24, Duncker & Humblot, Berlin 2010, ISBN 978-3-428-11205-0, p. 414 f. (Digitized version).
- Boris Gehlen: Paul Silverberg (1876-1959). An entrepreneur (= quarterly for social and economic history, supplements No. 194), Steiner, Stuttgart 2007, ISBN 978-3-515-09090-2 (dissertation Rheinische Friedrich-Wilhelms-Universität Bonn 2005/2006).
- Hermann Kellenbenz, Paul Silverberg (1876-1959), in: Rheinisch-Westfälische Wirtschaftsbiographien, Volume 9, Münster 1967, pp. 103-132.
- Reinhard Neebe: Big Industry, State and NSDAP 1930 - 1933. Paul Silverberg and the Reich Association of German Industry in the Crisis of the Weimar Republic (critical studies on historical science. Volume 45). Vandenhoeck & Ruprecht, Göttingen 1981, ISBN 3-525-35703-6. (Dissertation A University of Marburg, Department of History, 1980, DNB 213227002).
- Paul Silverberg, Internationales Biographisches Archiv 52/1959 of 14 December 1959, in the Munzinger Archive (beginning of article freely accessible)
