= Peter Stachura =

British historian

Peter D. Stachura is a British historian, writer, lecturer and essayist. He was Professor of Modern European History at the University of Stirling and Director of its Centre for Research in Polish History. He has published extensively on the subject of the modern history of Poland and its people, the Polish military effort alongside the Allies, and the shaping of the Nazi German state and the European Theatre during World War II.

== Biography ==
Stachura was born to a Polish military émigré from the Polish Armed Forces in the West. He graduated from the University of Glasgow and completed his PhD thesis, titled The development and organisation of the Hitler youth, 1930-1933, at the University of East Anglia in 1971. His main focus is on Polish history before 1945, the post-war history of the Poles in Scotland, the Polish government-in-exile, and the Weimar Republic. Stachura was the Director of the Centre for Research in Polish History at the University of Stirling.

== Bibliography ==
- The Shaping of the Nazi state, Taylor & Francis, 1978 - 304 pages, ISBN 0-85664-471-4
- The German youth movement, 1900-1945: an interpretative and documentary history, 1981 - 246 pages
- Gregor Strasser and the Rise of Nazism. London: George Allen & Unwin. 1983. ISBN 978-0-04943-027-3.
- Unemployment and the Great Depression in Weimar Germany, Macmillan, 1986 - 230 pages, ISBN 0-333-37646-3
- Themes of modern Polish history : proceedings of a symposium, 1992 - 92 pages
- Poland Between the Wars, 1998 - 153 pages, ISBN 0-312-21680-7
- Poland in the Twentieth Century, St. Martin's Press, 1999, ISBN 0-312-22027-8
- Perspectives on Polish History, University of Stirling, 2001, ISBN 1-85769-148-2
- The Poles in Britain, 1940-2000: from betrayal to assimilation, 2004 - 113 pages, ISBN 978-0-203-50664-6
- Poland, 1918-1945: an interpretive and documentary history of the Second Republic, Routledge, 2004 - 221 pages, ISBN 0-415-34357-7
