= List of speeches given by Adolf Hitler =

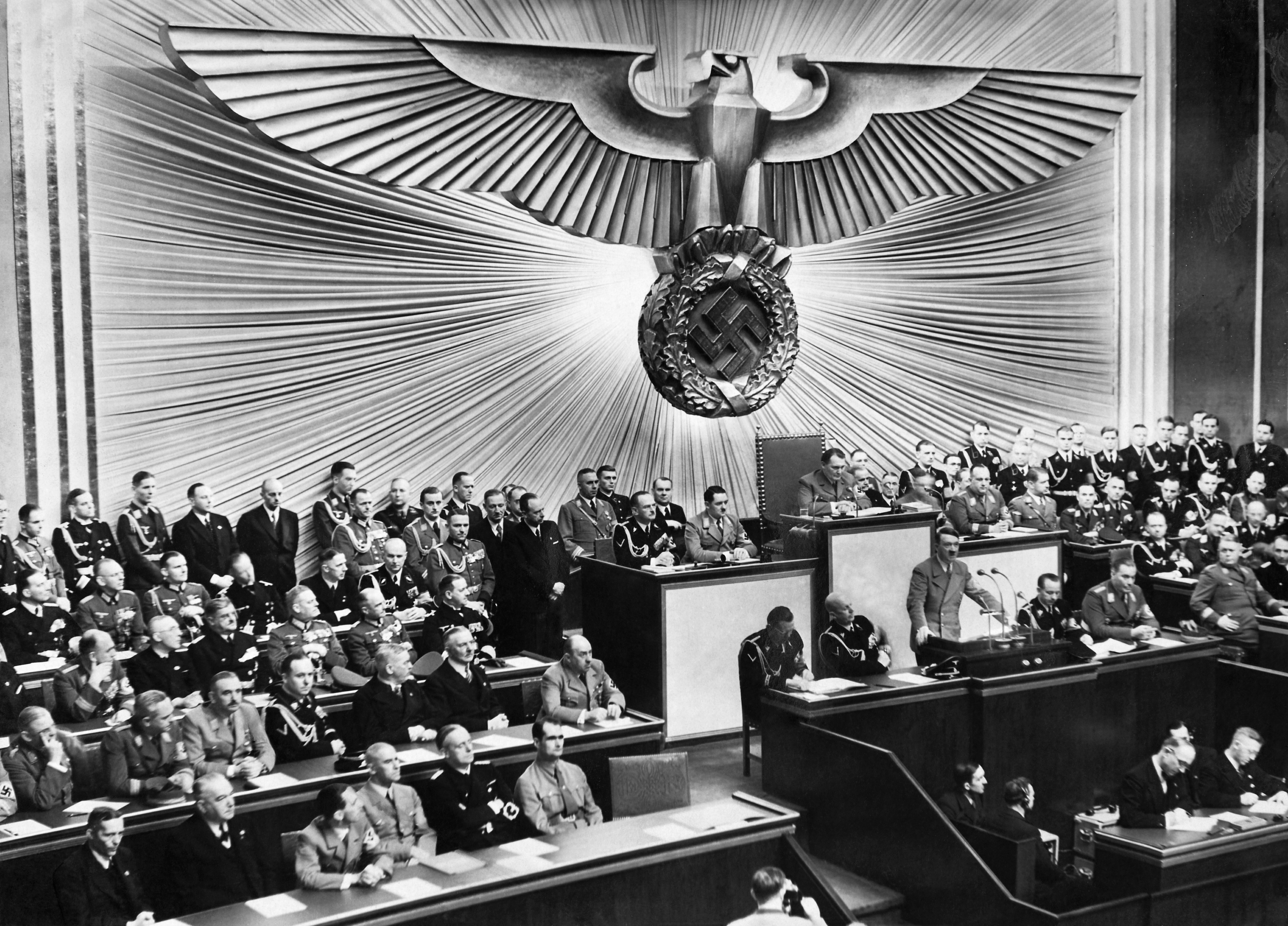
Hitler's prophecy speech of 30 January 1939

From his first speech in 1919 in Munich until the last speech in February 1945, Adolf Hitler, dictator of Nazi Germany from 1933 to 1945, gave a total of 1525 speeches. In 1932, for the presidential campaign and two federal elections that year, he gave the most speeches (totalling 241).

Because the Reichstag building was destroyed by a fire on 27 February 1933, all of Hitler’s addresses to the Reichstag were held at the neighbouring Kroll Opera House.

== Speeches ==
Bolded dates indicate a link to a separate article or full text on that particular speech.

Date		Place	Speech
16 October	1919	Munich, Hofbräukeller's beer hall.	Hitler's first arranged public speech. He had joined the German Workers' Party the previous month. 111 attended.
13 November	1919	Munich, Eberlbräukeller.	Hitler's second arranged public speech. 130 attended. 4 speakers. Subject of the meeting: "Brest-Litovsk or Versailles?" Hecklers began to shout out in the middle of the speech and were violently ejected.
24 February	1920	Munich, Hofbräuhaus.	First speech at a larger venue. 2,000 attended. The 25 article political programme founding the new National Socialist German Workers' Party was presented.
11 May	1920	Munich, Hofbräuhaus.	
13 August	1920	Munich, Hofbräuhaus.	Speech title "Why are we Antisemites?". 2,000 attended. 2-hour speech interrupted 58 times by cheering.
3 February	1921	Munich	First speech at the Circus Krone, Munich's biggest venue. Speech title "Future or Ruin" – denouncing reparation payment to Allies. 6,000 attended.
4 November	1921	Munich, Hofbräuhaus.	Meeting degenerated into a full scale brawl with political opponents while Hitler was speaking.
9 November	1921	Munich	...
12 April	1922	Munich	"There are only two possibilities: either victory of the Aryan, or annihilation of the Aryan and the victory of the Jew."
18 September	1922	Munich	"...Economics is a secondary matter. World history teaches us that no people became great through economics: it was economics that brought them to their ruin."
28 July	1922	Munich	"...IT IS a battle which began nearly 120 years ago, at the moment when the Jew was granted citizen rights in the European States. The political emancipation of the Jews was the beginning of an attack of delirium. "
13 April	1923	Munich	"We ask: 'Must there be wars?' The pacifist answers 'No!' "
24 April	1923	Munich	"The Jew who coined the word meant by 'Proletariat,' not the oppressed, but those who work with their hands."
27 April	1923	Munich	Call for a need to reform, from land reform to reform of press, art, culture, etc.
1 May	1923	Munich	"..then it must symbolize the renewal of the body of a people which has fallen into senility."
1 August	1923	Munich	"..there are two things which can unite men: common ideals and common criminality. "
12 September	1923	Munich	"..the Republic was founded to be a milk-cow for its founders – for the whole parliamentary gang."
26 February	1924	Munich Trial	"It seems strange to me that a man who, as a soldier, was for six years accustomed to blind obedience, should suddenly come into conflict with the State and its Constitution."
27 March	1924	Munich Trial	"When did the ruin of Germany begin?"
27 February	1925	Munich	Bürgerbräukeller – Re-founding the National Socialist German Workers' Party. 3,000 attended. On 9 March 1925 Hitler was banned from public speaking by Bavarian government. Most other German states followed suit.
4 July	1926	Weimar	2nd National Socialist German Workers' Party Congress. 6–7,000 attended. First public display of SS.
23 November	1926	Essen	... (Party Convention)
6 March	1927	Vilsbiburg	On 5 March 1927 the Bavarian government lifted the public speaking ban on Hitler, provided the initial speech was not in Munich. 1,000 attended.
9 March	1927	Munich	In the Circus Krone for the first time since 1923. 7,000 capacity audience
30 March	1927	Munich	In the Circus Krone. 5,000 attended
6 April	1927	Munich	In the Circus Krone. Only 1,500 attended.
1 May	1927	Berlin	In the Clou concert hall – Hitler's first speech in Berlin. Hitler was still banned from making public speeches in Prussia so the only legal way he could speak was to make this a private event open only to 4,000 party members
16 November	1928	Berlin	On 28 September 1928, following the poor performance of the National Socialists in the 20 May 1928 general election, the Prussian government lifted its speaking ban on Hitler. This was Hitler's first speech in the Berlin Sportpalast (Germany's largest venue) which was packed to 12,000 capacity.
2 May	1930	Berlin	In the Sportpalast.
18 July	1930	Munich	Opening speech of the 1930 election campaign. 8,000 audience.
3 August	1930	Frankfurt	25,000 audience.
5 August	1930	Würzburg	8,000 audience.
7 August	1930	Grafing	4,000 audience.
10 August	1930	Kiel	4,000 audience.
12 August	1930	Munich	Circus Krone. 6,000 audience.
15 August	1930	Essen	30,000 audience.
18 August	1930	Cologne	20,000 audience.
21 August	1930	Koblenz	12,000 audience.
26 August	1930	Ludwigshafen	20,000 audience.
29 August	1930	Munich	Circus Krone. 6,000 audience.
4 September	1930	Königsberg	16,000 audience.
6 September	1930	Hamburg	10,000 audience.
7 September	1930	Nuremberg	15,000 audience.
8 September	1930	Augsburg	10,000 audience.
10 September	1930	Berlin	Sportpalast – 16,000 audience.
12 September	1930	Breslau	Jahrhunderthalle – 20,000–25,000 audience.
13 September	1930	Munich	Circus Krone. 6,000 audience. Last speech of the 1930 election campaign. At the 14 September 1930 election the National Socialist Party increased its seats in the Reichstag from 12 to 107, becoming the 2nd largest party. A political earthquake.
4 December	1930	Berlin	Hasenheide – in front of students
19 May	1931	Berlin	In the Sportpalast.
7 June	1931	Chemnitz	At the Südkampfbahn in front of around 16,000 brownshirts and Hitler Youth boys. Hitler was recorded for the first time on sound film.
	1931	Berlin	... (Hasenheide Beer Hall)
27 January	1932	Düsseldorf	... (Industry Club)
9 February	1932	Berlin	In the Sportpalast.
27 February	1932	Berlin	In the Sportpalast.
4 April	1932	Berlin	At the Lustgarten in front of over 200,000 people for the second round of the German presidential election on 10 April 1932.
4 April	1932	Berlin	In the Sportpalast.
22 April	1932	Berlin	In the Sportpalast.
20 July	1932 (publication date)	Munich (publication place)	Franz Eher Nachfolger published Hitler's first phonograph recording titled Hitlers Appell an die Nation ("Hitler's Appeal to the Nation") as propaganda for the German federal election on 31 July 1932.
27 July	1932	Berlin	... (Berlin Stadium)
1 September	1932	Berlin	In the Sportpalast.
2 November	1932	Berlin	In the Sportpalast.
20 January	1933	Berlin	In the Sportpalast.
22 January	1933	Berlin	In the Sportpalast.
1 February	1933	Berlin	... (Proclamation to the German Nation)
10 February	1933	Berlin	In the Sportpalast.
15 February	1933	Stuttgart	...
2 March	1933	Berlin	In the Sportpalast.
23 March	1933	Berlin	Speech at Kroll Opera House advocating for the Enabling Act.
8 April	1933	Berlin	In the Sportpalast.
1 May	1933	Berlin	... (At Tempelhof airfield)
24 October	1933	Berlin	In the Sportpalast.
10 November	1933	Berlin	... (At Siemens Factory)
13 July	1934	Berlin	... (Justification of his actions against the SA leadership in the Night of the Long Knives)
8 November	1934	Munich	...
9 November	1934	Munich	...
7 March	1936	Berlin	Announcing remilitarisation of the Rhineland
27 March	1936	Essen	From the frame of a locomotive at the Krupp locomotive building for the German parliamentary election on 29 March 1936. Broadcast on all German radio stations. 120,000 audience.
12 September	1936	Nuremberg	... (Labour Front)
14 September	1936	Nuremberg	...
30 October	1936	Berlin	In the Sportpalast.
30 January	1937	Reichstag	...
19 July	1937	Munich	... (On the Opening of the German House of Art)
5 November	1937		... (given to Foreign Minister and military heads of the Reich)
15 March	1938	Vienna	Hofburg (Commemorating the Austrian Anschluss)
28 March	1938	Berlin	In the Sportpalast.
1 April	1938	Stuttgart	... (Schwaben Hall)
1 May	1938	Berlin	... (Olympic Stadium)
1 May	1938	Berlin	... (Lustgarten)
12 September	1938	Nuremberg	On the Sudetenland. The speech was carried live in the United States on CBS Radio, the first time many Americans heard Hitler speak.
26 September	1938	Berlin	In the Sportpalast.
5 October	1938	Berlin	In the Sportpalast.
9 October	1938	Saarbrücken	...
6 November	1938	Weimar	...
9 January	1939	Berlin	In the Sportpalast.
**30 January**	1939	Berlin	Prophecy speech: "If international finance Jewry inside and outside Europe should succeed in plunging the nations once more into a world war, the result will be not the Bolshevization of the earth and thereby the victory of Jewry, but the annihilation of the Jewish race in Europe."
1 April	1939	Wilhelmshaven	...
28 April	1939	Berlin	...(Response to Franklin Roosevelt)
**22 August**	1939	Berchtesgaden	...Obersalzberg: speech to military leaders, Invasion of Poland will begin
**1 September**	1939	Berlin	Declaration of war with Poland. "This night for the first time Polish regular soldiers fired on our territory. Since 5.45 A.M. we have been returning the fire... I am from now on just first soldier of the German Reich. I have once more put on that coat that was the most sacred and dear to me. I will not take it off again until victory is secured, or I will not survive the outcome."
19 September	1939	Danzig	...
**6 October**	1939	Berlin	Celebratory description of the conquest of Poland, and peace offer to the Allies, in the Reichstag.
10 October	1939	Berlin	In the Sportpalast.
24 January	1940	Berlin	In the Sportpalast.
30 January	1940	Berlin	In the Sportpalast.
3 May	1940	Berlin	In the Sportpalast.
19 July	1940	Reichstag	...
4 September	1940	Berlin	In the Sportpalast. "When the British Air Force drops two or three or four thousand kilograms of bombs, then we will in one night drop 150, 230, 300 or 400,000 kilograms. When they declare they will increase their attacks on our cities, then we will raze their cities to the ground. We will stop the handiwork of those night air pirates, so help us God! The hour will come when one of us will break and it will not be National Socialist Germany!"
18 December	1940	Berlin	In the Sportpalast.
10 December	1940	Berlin	... (Rheinmetall–Borsig Works)
30 January	1941	Berlin	In the Sportpalast.
24 February	1941	Munich	In the Hofbräuhaus. 21 years from the foundation of the NSDAP.
16 March	1941	Berlin	...
6 April	1941	Berlin	... (Order of the Day)
**4 May**	1941	Reichstag, Berlin	Address to the Reichstag
3 October	1941	Berlin	In the Sportpalast.
**11 December**	1941	Krolloper	Declaration of war against United States
30 January	1942	Berlin	In the Sportpalast.
15 February	1942	Berlin	In the Sportpalast.
24 may	1942	Obersalzberg (near Berchtesgaden)	talk to officers at the Platterhof
30 May	1942	Berlin	In the Sportpalast.
28 September	1942	Berlin	In the Sportpalast.
30 September	1942	Berlin	In the Sportpalast.
**8 November**	1942	Löwenbräukeller (Stiglmaierplatz)	Hitler's Stalingrad speech
23 March	1943	Berlin	Zeughaus: Address to the Heldengedenktag
8 November	1943	Löwenbräukeller (Stiglmaierplatz)	Speech on the 20th anniversary of the Munich Putsch, the so-called march on the Feldherrnhalle
11 November	1943	Breslau	Jahrhunderthalle: Address to 10,000 officer cadets
1 July	1944	Berlin	Reichskanzlei: Act of state, funeral speech Generaloberst Dietl
4 July	1944	Berchtesgaden	Platterhof, Obersalzberg: Speech to 200 senior managers of German industry
20 July	1944	Wolf's Lair	Radio address following assassination attempt by Claus von Stauffenberg
1 January	1945	Adlerhorst	Führerhauptquartier: Radio address: New year speech
30 January	1945	Reichskanzlei, Berlin	Radio address: Anniversary of coming to power.
24 February	1945	Berlin	Last Speech on the Silver Jubilee anniversary of the founding of the Nazi Party.

== Other ==
Only one known recording exists of Hitler's voice when he is not giving a speech. An engineer for Finnish state broadcaster Yle secretly recorded 11 minutes of Hitler's 1942 meeting with Finnish leader Carl Gustaf Emil Mannerheim.

== Bibliography ==
- Baynes, Norman H. Ed. (1942). The Speeches of Adolf Hitler, April 1922 – August 1939 V1. London, Oxford University Press. ISBN 0598758933
- Baynes, Norman H. Ed. (1942). The Speeches of Adolf Hitler, April 1922 – August 1939 V2. London, Oxford University Press. ISBN 0598758941
- Hitler, Adolf (1973) [1941]. Roussy de Sales, Raoul de (ed.). My New Order. New York: Octagon Books. ISBN 0374939187.
- Kershaw, Ian (1999). Hitler: 1889–1936 : Hubris. Vol. One. New York: W.W. Norton & Company. pp. . ISBN 0393046710.
- Kershaw, Ian (2000). Hitler: 1936–1945 : Nemesis. Vol. Two. New York: W.W. Norton & Company. pp. . ISBN 978-0393049947.
- Doramus, Max (2007). The Complete Hitler: A Digital Desktop Reference to His Speeches & Proclamations, 1932–1945. CD-Rom Edition. Bolchazy-Carducci. ISBN 978-0865166585.
- Domarus, Max (2007). The Essential Hitler: Speeches and Commentary. Bolchazy-Carducci. ISBN 978-0865166653.
