= Hitler's prophecy =

Adolf Hitler's speech on 30 January 1939

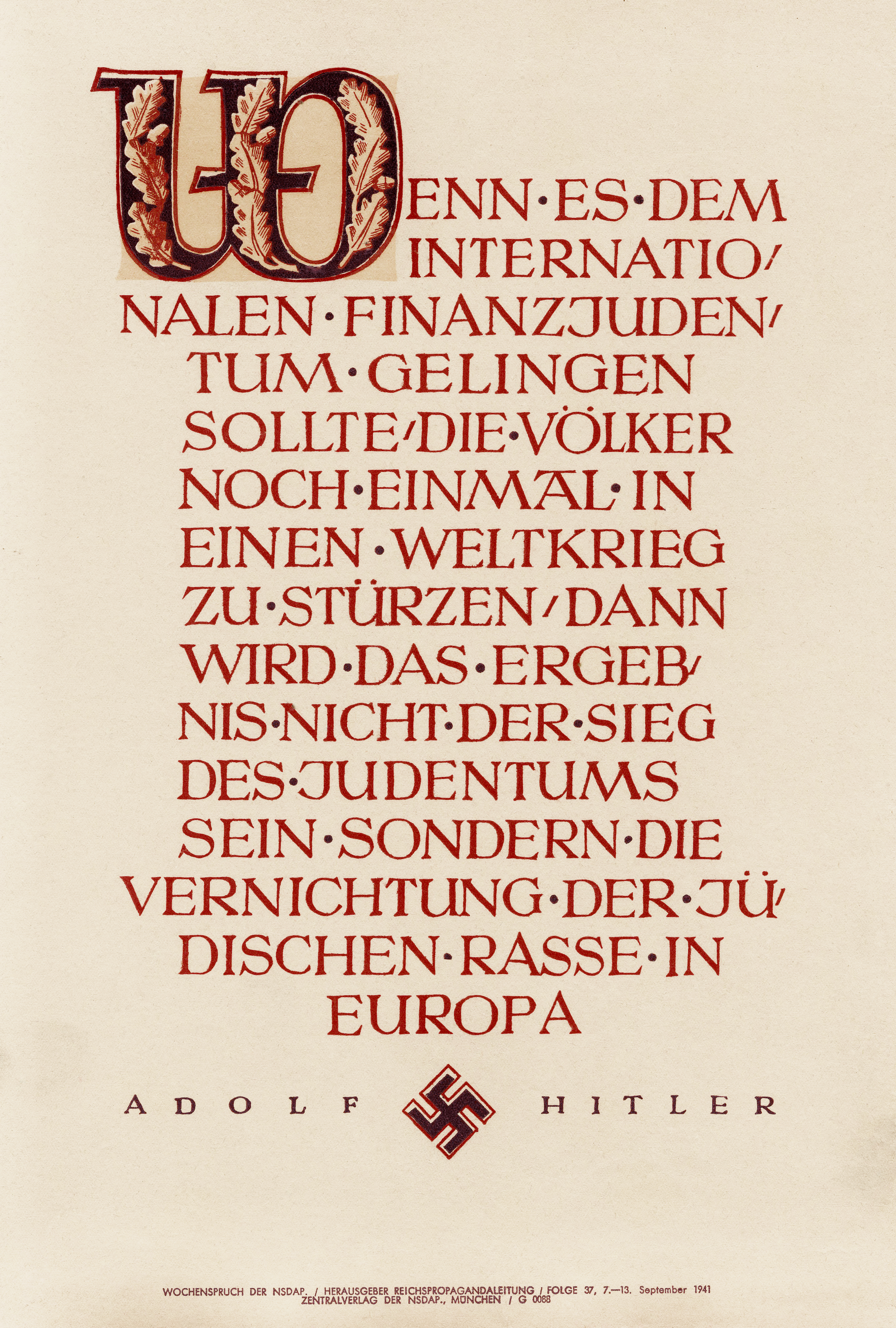
Wochenspruch der NSDAP, displayed 7–13 September 1941, quotes Hitler's speech on 30 January 1939. (The rendition omits "inside and outside Europe" and "the Bolshevization of the earth and thereby"...)

During a speech at the Reichstag on 30 January 1939, Adolf Hitler, dictator of Nazi Germany, threatened "the annihilation of the Jewish race in Europe" in the event of another world war:

If the international Jewish financiers in and outside Europe should succeed in plunging the nations once more into a world war, then the result will not be the Bolshevization of the earth, and thus the victory of Jewry, but the annihilation of the Jewish race in Europe!

These words were similar to comments that Hitler had previously made to foreign politicians in private meetings after the Kristallnacht pogrom in November 1938. The speech was made in the context of Nazi attempts to increase Jewish emigration from Germany, before the outbreak of World War II in September 1939.

Allusions to "Hitler's prophecy" by Nazi leaders and in Nazi propaganda were common after 30 January 1941, when Hitler mentioned it again in a speech. The prophecy took on new meaning with the invasion of the Soviet Union in June 1941 and the German declaration of war against the United States that December, both of which facilitated an acceleration of the systematic mass murder of Jews. In late 1941, Nazi propaganda chief Joseph Goebbels stated that the prophecy was being fulfilled while justifying the mass deportation of Jews from Germany. On 30 September 1942, Hitler referenced the prophecy in another speech, which was adapted into a November issue of Parole der Woche titled "They Will Stop Laughing!!!" Hitler continued to invoke the prophecy as the war went against Germany and referenced it in his last will and testament. Frequently used by Nazi leaders when alluding to their systematic murder of Jews, the prophecy became a leitmotif of the Final Solution and it is perhaps the best-known phrase from Hitler's speeches.

The historical significance of the prophecy is debated between the schools of functionalism and intentionalism: intentionalists view it as proof of Hitler's previously developed master plan to systematically murder the European Jews, while functionalists argue that "annihilation" was not meant or understood to mean mass murder, at least initially. The prophecy is cited by historians as an example of the Nazis' belief in an international Jewish conspiracy that supposedly started the war. Additionally, despite its vagueness—not explaining how the annihilation would come about—the prophecy is cited as evidence that Germans were aware that Jews were being exterminated.

== Background ==
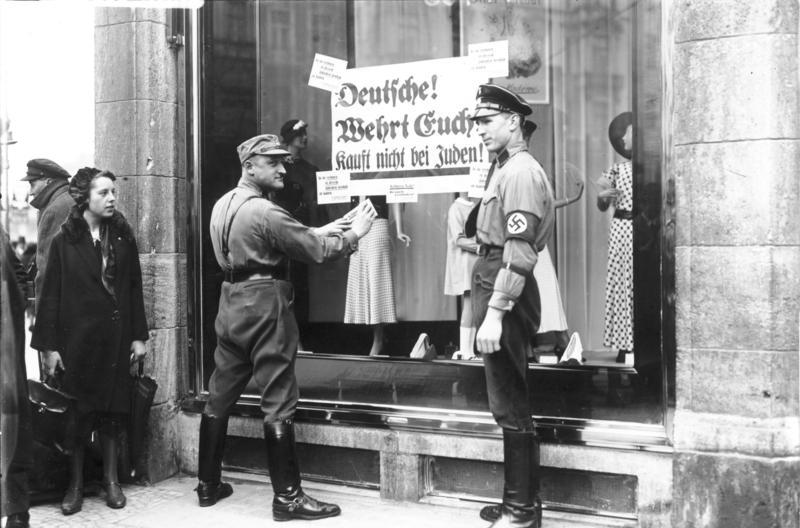
SA paramilitaries outside a Berlin store on 1 April 1933 during the Nazi boycott of Jewish businesses. The sign reads: "Germans! Defend yourselves! Don't buy from Jews!"

According to historian Ian Kershaw, upon Nazi Party leader Adolf Hitler's seizure of power on 30 January 1933, the Nazi mass movement was already "proto-genocidal" and "held together by the utopian vision of national salvation, to be achieved through racial cleansing at the core of which was the 'removal' of the Jews". In April 1933, the one-day Nazi boycott of Jewish businesses was announced and the SA (the paramilitary wing of the Nazi Party) was posted around Jewish businesses to enforce the boycott. Between 1933 and 1939, more than 400 anti-Jewish laws and decrees were enacted. In 1935, the Nuremberg Laws defined Jews by their ancestry rather than religion, formalized their exclusion from society, and outlawed marriages and sexual relationships between Jews and "German-blooded" people. Other laws banned Jews from owning property or earning a living.

Hitler had associated the Jews and war in several speeches before 1939. In 1931, Hitler said in the event of war, the Jews would be "crushed by the wheels of history"; he also characterized the 1933 anti-Nazi boycott as a Jewish declaration of war against Germany. According to historian Claudia Koonz, between taking power in 1933 and his prophecy speech in January 1939, Hitler only overtly voiced his hatred of Jews on two occasions: in a 1935 speech announcing the introduction of the Nuremberg Laws, and at the Nuremberg Rally in September 1937. Although race was not prominent in his discourse in the 1930s, Hitler found subtle ways to signal antisemitism to his core followers while maintaining a moderate public image. In discussions of the proper solution to the Jewish Question in the 1930s, extermination was often discussed as an option by SS officials, (Note: The SS was a Nazi paramilitary group, commanded by Heinrich Himmler, that was established in 1925 and operated parallel to the SA.) although it was usually discarded.

=== Kristallnacht ===
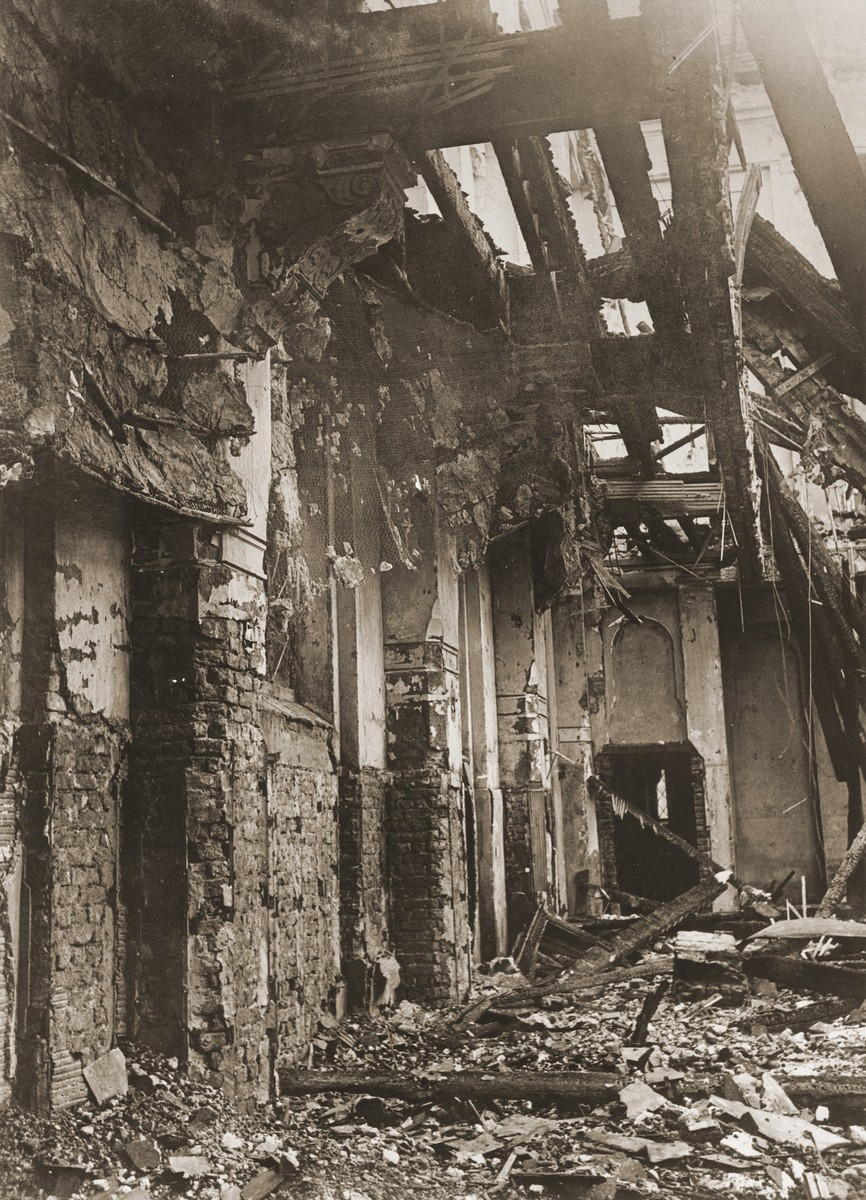
Old synagogue in Aachen after Kristallnacht

In November 1938, the Nazi leadership organized and incited the Kristallnacht pogrom against Jews, in part to bleed off excess antisemitic sentiment from party activists that had been suppressed for diplomatic reasons during the Munich crisis. The pogrom involved unprecedented public violence against German Jews, including the burning of synagogues, looting of Jewish-owned stores and residences, and assaults on Jews, which (according to official figures) caused 91 deaths. Hitler personally approved the arrest of 30,000 Jews and their incarceration in concentration camps. Many Germans were disgusted by the violence, although few overtly opposed the government. Kristallnacht was also denounced abroad, endangering the German government's efforts to organize and facilitate the emigration of German Jews.

Kristallnacht radicalized the anti-Jewish discourse in German society. The Nazi Party conducted a propaganda campaign from November 1938 to January 1939 to justify the pogrom to the German people. The idea of exterminating Jews became more common. On 12 November, Hermann Göring convened a meeting of Nazi leaders in Hitler's name. Göring stated that "it goes without question" that Germany would consider "carrying out a great reckoning with the Jews" in the event of war. Historian Yehuda Bauer writes that this statement is "very similar" to what Hitler said on 30 January 1939. On 24 November, the SS newspaper Das Schwarze Korps, reflecting on the meeting of 12 November, printed the following statement: "This stage of development [of the Jews] will impose on us the vital necessity to exterminate the Jewish subhumanity as we exterminate all criminals in our law-abiding state: with fire and sword! The outcome will be the actual and final end to Jewry in Germany, its total annihilation." This language reflected the radicalization in party circles, and the writers were aware that it aligned with Hitler's view.

=== Statements to diplomats ===
On 21 November 1938, Hitler met with the South African defense minister Oswald Pirow and told him that the Jews would be killed if war broke out. The same month, an official of Hitler's chancellery told a British diplomat of German plans "to get rid of [German] Jews, either by emigration or if necessary by starving or killing them" to avoid "having such a hostile minority in the country in the event of war". He also said that Germany "intended to expel or kill off the Jews in Poland, Hungary and the Ukraine" after invading those countries. On 16 January 1939, Hitler met with István Csáky, the foreign minister of Hungary. Csáky recalled that "he was sure of only one thing, the Jews would have to disappear from Germany to the last man".

On 21 January, Hitler told František Chvalkovský, the foreign minister of Czechoslovakia: "Our Jews will be annihilated. The Jews did not perpetrate 9 November 1918 for nothing; this day will be avenged." Hitler added that the Jews were also poisoning Czechoslovakia, prompting an antisemitic diatribe from Chvalkovský. In the same meeting, Hitler threatened the "annihilation" of Czechoslovakia if it did not conform to German demands. According to historian Hans Mommsen, Hitler was referring to destroying the influence of the Jews rather than calling for their physical destruction. Historian Peter Longerich interprets "annihilation" to refer to emigration or expulsion of Jews leading to "the end of their collective existence in Germany". Kershaw argues that, while Hitler was not announcing his intentions to Chvalkovský, "the sentiments were not merely rhetoric or propaganda".

== Speech of 30 January 1939 ==
External videos
- Footage of speech

Although the Évian Conference in July 1938 had failed to open other countries to Jewish emigrants, the Nazis still attempted to hasten the emigration of Jews from Germany. At the time of the speech, discussions were ongoing between Göring and George Rublee, director of the Intergovernmental Committee for Refugees. Nazi propaganda minister Joseph Goebbels helped write the speech, which was delivered in the Reichstag on 30 January 1939, the sixth anniversary of Hitler's seizure of power in 1933. The speech lasted two or two-and-a-half hours and dealt with both the foreign and domestic policies of the Nazi government. Hitler expressed his desire for additional "living space" and discussed the Munich crisis, admitting that he had planned a military invasion in the event that Czechoslovakia did not capitulate to his demand to surrender the Sudetenland. He maintained that the Sudetenland had been secured by German willingness to resort to war, rather than by diplomacy.

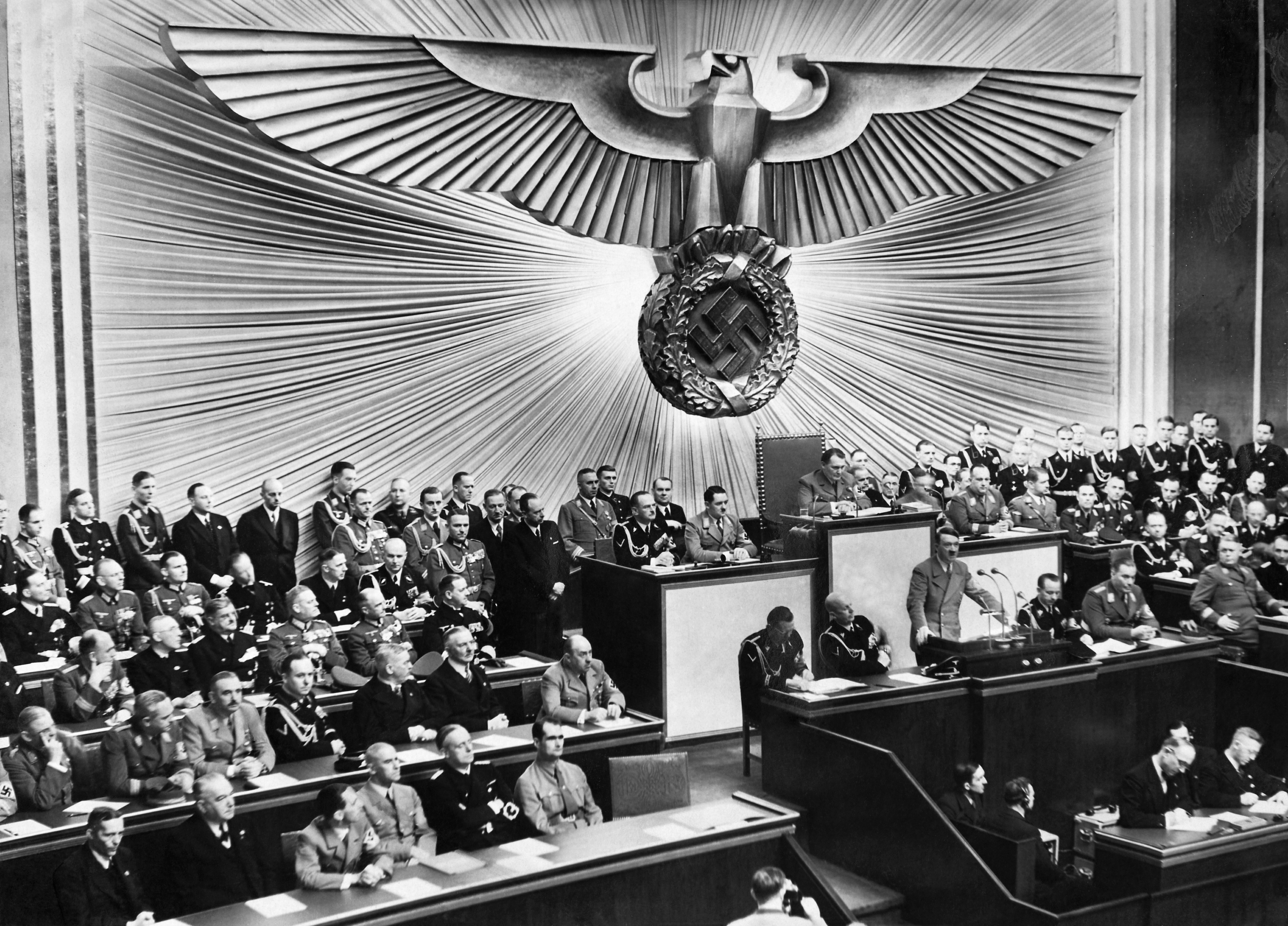
Hitler during the speech

In the part of the speech dealing with the Jewish question, Hitler complained that there was enough space in the world for German Jews to go, and contended that Europe could "not become pacified before the Jewish question has been settled". In a long rant against Jews, Hitler first mocked them, then said that it was time to "wrestle the Jewish world enemy to the ground", and that the German government was completely determined "to get rid of these people". He asserted that Jews would have to stop "liv[ing] off the body and productive work of other nations", or else they would "succumb to a crisis of unimaginable severity". He claimed that the Jews were trying to incite "millions among the masses of people into a conflict that is utterly senseless for them and serves only Jewish interests". Hitler then arrived at his main point:

I have very often in my lifetime been a prophet and have been mostly derided. At the time of my struggle for power it was in the first instance the Jewish people who only greeted with laughter my prophecies that I would someday take over the leadership of the state and of the entire people of Germany and then, among other things, also bring the Jewish problem to its solution. I believe that this hollow laughter of Jewry in Germany has already stuck in its throat. I want today to be a prophet again: if international finance Jewry inside and outside Europe should succeed in plunging the nations once more into a world war, the result will be not the Bolshevization of the earth and thereby the victory of Jewry, but the annihilation of the Jewish race in Europe.

Hitler's assertion did not necessarily imply physical annihilation. Later in the speech he said:

Should indeed this one Volk attain its goal of prodding masses of millions from other peoples to enter into a war devoid of all sense for them, and serving the interests of the Jews exclusively, then the effectiveness of an enlightenment will once more display its might. Within Germany, this enlightenment conquered Jewry utterly in the span of a few years.

=== Dissemination and reactions ===
The speech was broadcast live on radio and Hitler's prediction about the Jews was reprinted in the party newspaper Völkischer Beobachter and in a dedicated pamphlet. According to Goebbels' explicit instructions to Fritz Hippler, the part of the speech that included Hitler's threat against the Jews was recorded simultaneously in audio and video (a difficult technical achievement at the time) and included in the weekly UFA Wochenschau newsreel after Hitler personally approved it. Newsreels typically played down the exclusionary aspect of the people's community; January 1939 was the first time that Nazi policies towards the Jews were directly connected to the party leader on newsreels. Historian Richard J. Evans writes that the threat "could not have been more public".

At the time of the speech, Jews and non-Jews inside and outside Germany were paying close attention to Hitler's statements because of Kristallnacht and the possibility of war. In the following days, the speech attracted significant commentary in Germany. The German-Jewish diarists Luise Solmitz and Victor Klemperer mentioned the speech in their diaries but paid little attention to Hitler's threat. Outside Germany, coverage of the speech focused on the geopolitical implications of Hitler's discussion of foreign policy, while the threat to Jews went unremarked. The New York Yiddish newspaper Forverts printed a headline referencing Hitler's threat against the Jews, but the article below it only discussed the threat of war and Hitler's alliances with Italy and Japan. The Warsaw Yiddish newspaper Haynt discussed the speech in several issues beginning on 31 January, but did not emphasize the prophecy. On 31 January, it printed the main points of the speech without mentioning the prophecy; in an analysis of the speech published the next day, columnist Moshe Yustman discussed appeasement and other foreign policy issues.

== References to the prophecy ==
Hitler made over a dozen references to his threat both publicly and privately. At the height of the Holocaust in 1942, Hitler publicly referenced his prophecy on at least four occasions. At the same time, Hitler's rhetoric became much harsher as he changed from speaking of "annihilating" (vernichten) Jews to "exterminating" (ausrotten) them. He consistently, and probably intentionally, misdated the prophecy to 1 September 1939, when the German invasion of Poland began. By emphasizing the link between the war and the persecution of the Jews, the persecution could be construed as a justified response to an attack on Germany. Hitler always referenced the prophecy when discussing the extermination of the Jews. From late 1941, Nazi propagandists consistently avoided discussion of concrete anti-Jewish actions, such as deportations, instead relying on the prophecy's generality.

Besides Nazi leaders, army propaganda and ordinary soldiers also referred to the prophecy. (Note: A November 1941 newsletter for soldiers explained the difference between prophecy and reality: "[The prophecy] was a hard, pitiless statement that many did not take seriously[,] interpreting it only in an allegorical manner. But the Jews knew that a death warrant stood behind this prophecy and that it would inevitably come to pass if plutocracy and Bolshevism one day collapsed and were replaced by a new world order.") (Note: One letter from August 1941 reads as follows: "One particular chapter is the fact that the Jewish question is being solved at present with massive thoroughness. As the Führer indeed said in his speech shortly before the beginning of the war: 'If Jewry...'" Kershaw cites another letter from a soldier who cited the prophecy and thanked Der Stürmer for staying true to its antisemitic principles.) In a letter dated 5 October 1941, police lieutenant and Holocaust perpetrator Walter Mattner wrote to his wife justifying the murder of Jewish children and referencing Hitler's prophecy. Jews were also aware of the prophecy; Warsaw Ghetto diarist Chaim Kaplan wrote on 1 September 1939 that, since war would break out, Polish Jews might face the fate that Hitler had foretold. On 2 February 1942, Kaplan wrote that Hitler "boasted that his prophecy is beginning to come true: had he not said that if a war would break out in Europe the Jewish people would be annihilated? This process has already begun and will continue until the end is reached." "Hitler's oft-repeated intention to exterminate the Jewish people in Europe" was referenced in the Joint Declaration by Members of the United Nations on 17 December 1942.

=== The Eternal Jew ===
Footage of Hitler making the threat was included in the 1940 film The Eternal Jew. According to historian Bill Niven, the film makes the case to Germans that they were fighting a race war and life-or-death struggle against Jews. The film was a flop and a month after its release was only being shown in one cinema in Berlin. Historian Alon Confino writes that Germans rejected the film because its scenes, shot in German-occupied Poland, were too explicit in showing what "annihilation" might actually entail.

=== 30 January 1941 speech ===
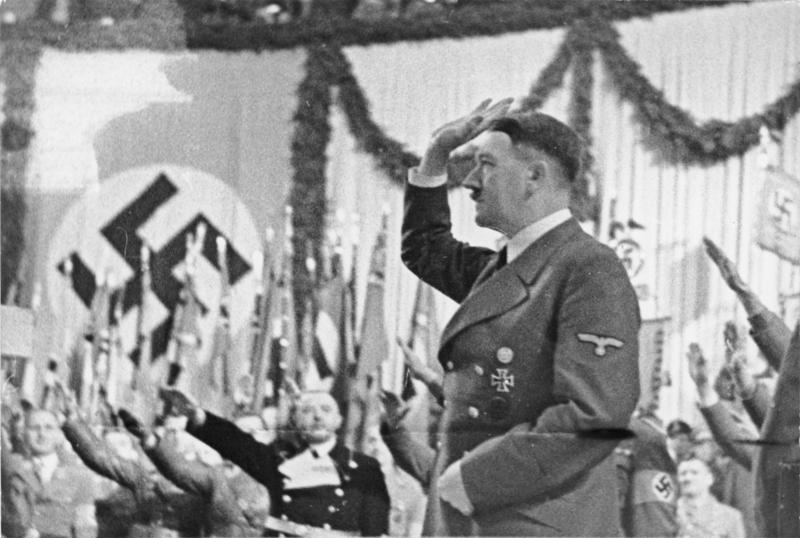
Hitler at the Sportpalast, 30 January 1942

Hitler mentioned the prophecy at a 30 January 1941 speech in the Sportpalast. (Note: "Not to be forgotten is the comment I’ve already made in the Reichstag, on September 1, 1939 [actually January 30, 1939], that if the world were to be pushed by Jewry into a general war, the role of the whole of Jewry in Europe would be finished … Today, they [the Jews] may still be laughing about [that statement], just as they laughed earlier about my prophecies.") Kershaw suggests that although Hitler may have had his threat in mind during the intervening years or was reminded of it by a subordinate, it was most likely the clip from The Eternal Jew that reminded him. Hitler then expressed his hope that the Western nations at war with Germany would realize that their greatest enemy was "international Jewish exploitation and the corruption of nations!" In the speech, Hitler implied that his previous threats against German Jews had caused the international Jewish community to influence Western powers into appeasement of Germany, and renewed threats would induce the Jews to convince the British government to make peace. Under the headline "The Jew will be exterminated", the speech was published in German and translated for international media companies. The editors of The New York Times (believed by the Nazis to be at the center of the "Jewish press") wrote that Hitler did not have a record of following through on promises or threats. (Note: "...inside Germany or outside, no one in the world expects truth from Adolf Hitler. For eight years he has wielded absolute power over a people whose voice is submerged, as it was yesterday at the Sportpalast by the mechanical clamor of the Party claque. In all that time there is not a single precedent to prove that he will either keep a promise or fulfill a threat. If there is any guarantee in his record, in fact, it is that the one thing he will not do is the thing he says he will do. For eight years he has been the sole and uncontradicted spokesman for Germany—and today the word of Germany is worthless." Jeffrey Herf argues that this response "illustrated the difficulty that even the most sophisticated and informed observers had in understanding Hitler".)

At the time of the January 1941 speech, the Nazi leadership was already planning the invasion of the Soviet Union and considering deporting Jews to the conquered territories after a victory. Therefore, Kershaw argues, Hitler's crusade against Jewish Bolshevism "was taking concrete shape in his mind" and by referencing the prophecy, he implied that a reckoning with the Jewish enemy was imminent. Kershaw also wrote that the reference hinted at something like the Madagascar Plan and "a repeat of the blackmail ploy that he held the Jews in his power as hostages".

=== Invasion of the Soviet Union ===
On 22 June 1941, Germany invaded the Soviet Union; by August, the campaign was not proceeding as well as Nazi leaders hoped. Goebbels published the essay "Mimicry" in Das Reich on 20 July 1941. It was one of his most influential extended attacks on the Jews, in which he elaborated on Hitler's prophecy. Goebbels argued that the Jews practiced "mimicry" by infiltrating nations and secretly controlling the Allied governments; they were using their power to prolong the war so that Europe would bleed out and be too weak to resist the "Bolshevization" that Jews intended to inflict upon it. He claimed that the Nazis were able to "unmask" them by ignoring historical contingency (the method which historians use to explain events) and threatened a terrible punishment for their alleged guilt. (Note: "...'the Jews are guilty! The Jews are guilty!' The punishment that will break over them will be frightful. Just as the fist of an awakened Germany once slammed down on this racial rubbish, one day the fist of an awakened Europe will do likewise. Then the Jews’ mimicry will be useless … That will be the day of people’s justice over the source of their ruin and downfall. The blow will be delivered without pity and without mercy. The world’s enemy [Weltfeind] will collapse, and Europe will have its peace.")

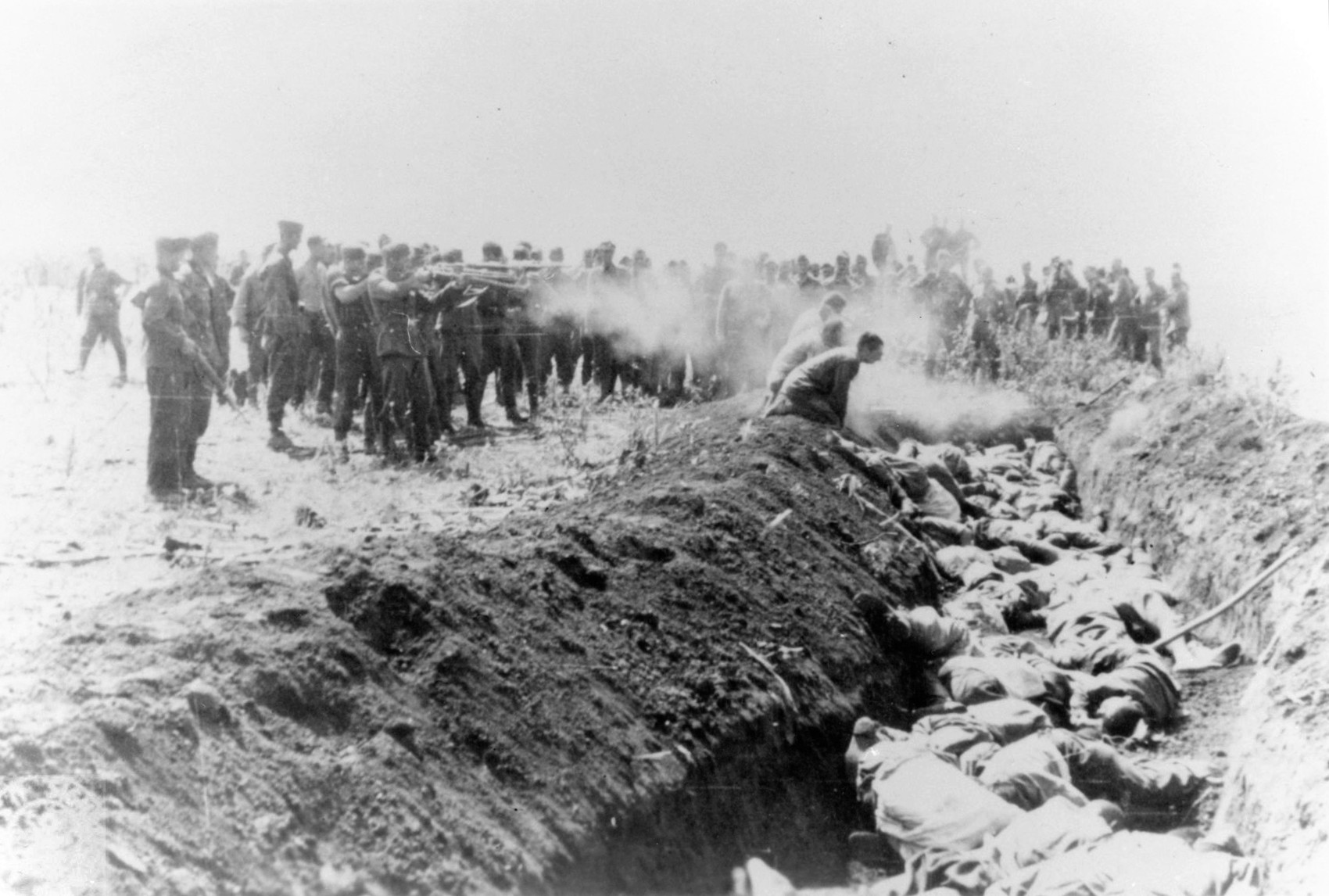
Mass shooting of Soviet civilians by German soldiers in 1941

In mid-August 1941, Goebbels received a report of a mass shooting of Jews in the Baltics and connected the killing to Hitler's prophecy. According to Goebbels' diary entry on 19 August, Hitler mentioned the prophecy when granting Goebbels' request to force Jews in Germany to wear yellow stars. Hitler said that the Jews were paying the price for the war, (Note: "The Führer believes that his past prophecy in the Reichstag is being confirmed, that if Jewry succeeded in again provoking a world war, it would end with the annihilation of the Jews. It is coming to pass in these weeks and months with an almost eerily graceful certainty. In the East, the Jews are paying for it. In Germany, they have already in part paid for it, and in the future they will have to pay still more.") and that they "will not have much cause to laugh in [the] future". Hitler indicated his certainty that his prophecy would come true in weeks to months, which historian Tobias Jersak interprets as evidence that the order for the Final Solution had been issued. According to Longerich, Hitler was willing to authorize harsher measures against Jews in Germany because of the mass shootings of Jews in the occupied Soviet Union that he had ordered. The diary entry indicates that both Hitler and Goebbels drew a causal connection between the war and the extermination of the Jews.

The Nazi Party printed the prophecy on one of its weekly quotation posters (Wochenspruch der NSDAP) to be displayed on 7–13 September 1941. (Note: "Should the international Jewish financiers succeed once again in plunging the nations into a world war, the result will not be the victory of the Jews but the annihilation of the Jewish race in Europe.") These posters were sent to all of the Nazi Party's local branches and displayed prominently throughout Germany. According to Jersak, the true meaning of the posters may not have been obvious to ordinary Germans. In mid-September, Hitler made the decision to deport German Jews to the occupied Soviet Union; historians highlight the temporal proximity to the display of the posters. In the lead article on 15 October from the periodical Die Judenfrage in Politik, Recht, Kultur und Wirtschaft titled "The War Guilt of the Jews", a series of quotes from various Jews is joined together in an effort to prove that the Jews declared war against Germany; the prophecy is mentioned at the end of the article.

On 25 October, referring to attempts to drown Jewish women in the Pripet marshes, Hitler mentioned his prophecy that asserted the "criminal race", supposedly responsible for German casualties in World War I and "now again hundreds of thousands", would be destroyed. (Note: "This race of criminals has the two million dead of the World War on its conscience, and now it has hundreds of thousands more. Let nobody say to me: We can't send them into the swamps! Who's worrying about our people? It’s good if the fear that we are exterminating the Jews goes before us.") On 8 November 1941, Hitler referred to the prophecy in his annual speech at the Löwenbräukeller in Munich to commemorate the Beer Hall Putsch. Hitler said that all measures would be taken so that "November 1918 will never happen again". The speech was reported in the Nazi media, Völkischer Beobachter running the story under the headline "The Jewish Enemy" and concluding that "the war against the Jewish international is a life and death struggle that must be ruthlessly fought to the end". According to Longerich, Hitler intended to cement his leadership role: "All bridges had been burnt and the 'people' had no alternative but to entrust themselves to Hitler’s purportedly superhuman leadership qualities and support his conduct of the war until victory had been achieved."

=== "The Jews are Guilty" ===
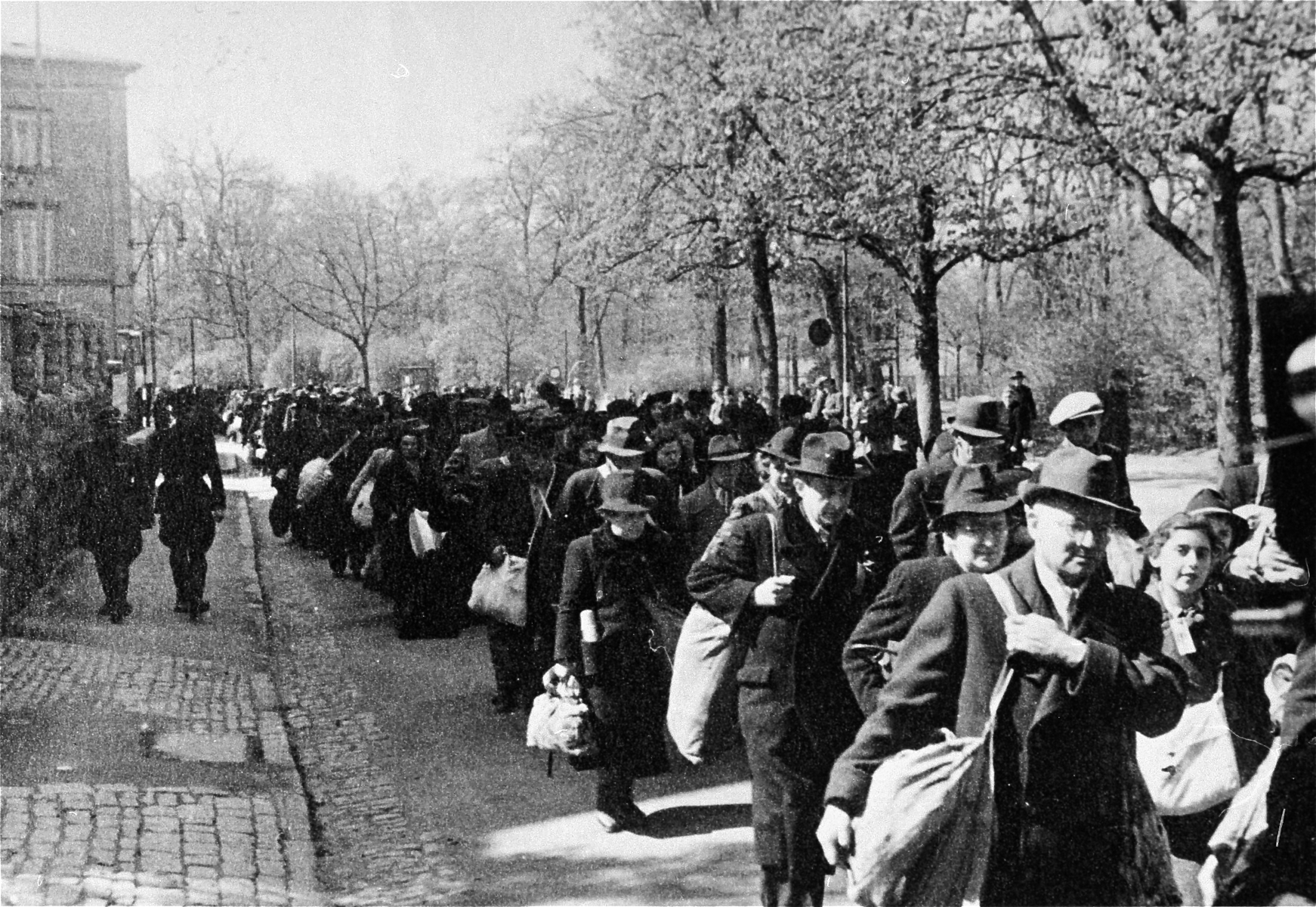
Jews are deported from Würzburg, 25 April 1942. Deportation occurred in public and was witnessed by many Germans.

External image
- English translation of "The Jews are Guilty"

On 16 November 1941, Goebbels wrote an article titled "The Jews are Guilty" in Das Reich, aiming to justify the ongoing deportation of the Jews. It was one of the most vehemently antisemitic writings that Goebbels published. (Note: After publishing the article, Goebbels wrote in his diary: "The current fate that the Jews are now suffering is not an injustice. Rather, it merely returns to them what they had intended to do to us. My Jewish essay is quoted in all the world press … Anti-Semitism is growing in Europe, and the longer the war lasts, the stronger it will become.") Kershaw suggests that Goebbels probably discussed the article with Hitler before publication. Goebbels wrote:

The historical guilt of world Jewry for the outbreak and expansion of this war has been so extensively demonstrated that there is no need to waste any more words on it. The Jews wanted their war, and now they have it ... At present we are experiencing the realization of this prophecy and so the Jews are meeting with a fate that may be harsh but is also more than deserved. In this case pity or regret is completely inappropriate. In unleashing this war, world Jewry completely misjudged the forces at its disposal. Now it is suffering a gradual process of extermination that it had intended for us and that it would have unleashed against us without hesitation if it had the power to do so. It is now perishing as a result of its own law: An eye for an eye, a tooth for a tooth... In this historical dispute every Jew is our enemy, whether he vegetates in a Polish ghetto or scrapes out his parasitic existence in Berlin or Hamburg or blows war trumpets in New York or Washington. Owing to their birth and race, all Jews belong to an international conspiracy against National Socialist Germany. They wish for its defeat and annihilation and do everything in their power to help to bring it about.

The article referred explicitly to Hitler's approval for the annihilation and listed actions that Germans should take against Jews ("enemy of the people") and anyone who associated with them, who was to be "regarded and treated as a Jew". Historian Heinrich August Winkler argues that it was primarily intended as a warning to Germans who disagreed with Nazi antisemitism. The article was the first time a Nazi leader had announced that the annihilation of European Jews had gone from threat to reality. According to historian Jeffrey Herf, Goebbels presented the international Jewish conspiracy "on the offensive against an innocent, victimized German object". Goebbels had recycled the article title from a 1932 article he wrote for Der Angriff. In both cases, Jews were blamed for the failure of the Nazis to achieve their goals, which led to an increase in anti-Jewish aggression. At the time, Das Reich had a circulation above one million, and the article was broadcast on the German Home Service. Goebbels ordered the article to be distributed to soldiers on the Eastern Front. According to the public opinion reports prepared by the Security Service (SD), the article "found a strong echo" among Germans, although some churchgoers were critical of it. Historians have argued that the article gave a clear answer as to the fate of the Jews. (Note: Herf argues that the reference to "extermination" was unambiguous because the German language has words for "impoverishment, discrimination, deportation, and illness", although Goebbels' "formulations left enough ambiguity and absence of detail to promote plausible deniability among an indifferent or incredulous mass audience". Norman Domeier wrote that the article "made public and legitimized" the ongoing Nazi murder of the European Jews. Historian Nicholas Stargardt states that Goebbels "came close to stating bluntly that the regime’s policy was to kill the Jews". Winkler writes that those who heard about the article "learned that masses of Jews were being killed in the east", and that the meaning "was impossible to misunderstand or ignore". According to Longerich, the article was a "sufficiently clear answer" regarding the fate of Jews deported from Germany.)

=== Friedrich-Wilhelm University speech ===
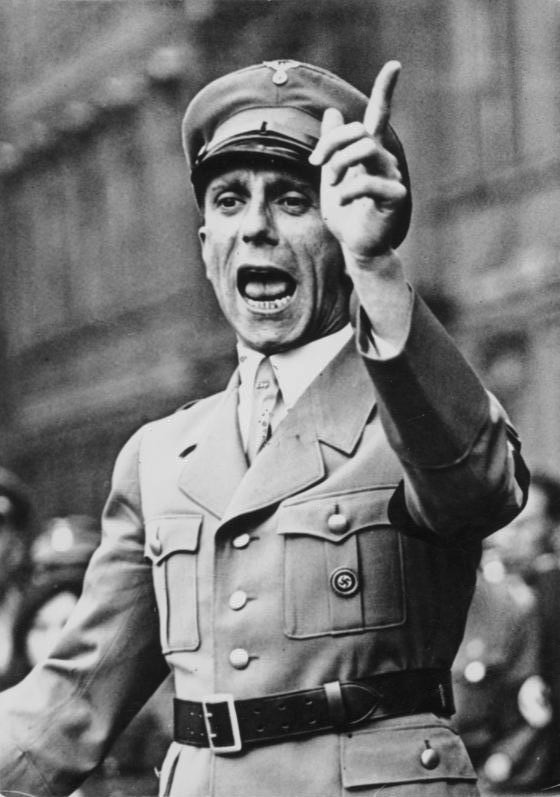
Joseph Goebbels gives a speech in 1934.

Goebbels presented the narrative to German elites in a speech at Friedrich-Wilhelm University in Berlin on 1 December. "We are now experiencing the implementation of this prophecy. … [Jewry] is now suffering a gradual process of extermination". (Note: "The historic guilt of world Jewry for the outbreak and expansion of this war is so sufficiently proven that we don’t need to waste any more words about it. The Jews wanted their war, and now they have it. But now the prophecy which the Führer expressed on January 30, 1939, in the German Reichstag is also proving true—namely, that if international finance Jewry should succeed in driving the peoples once again into a world war, the result would not be the Bolshevization of the earth and thus the victory of Jewry but rather the annihilation of the Jewish race in Europe. We are now experiencing the implementation of this prophecy. Jewry is thus now enduring a fate that is hard but is more than deserved. Sympathy or even regret is wholly out of place. World Jewry in unleashing this war made a completely false assessment of the forces at its disposal. It is now suffering a gradual process of extermination [“Es erleidet nun einen allmählichen Vernichtungsprozeß”] that it intended for us and that it would without question have carried out if it had the power to do so." "In this historic confrontation, every Jew is our enemy, whether he is vegetating in a Polish ghetto or enjoying his parasitic existence in Berlin or Hamburg or blowing the trumpets of war in New York or Washington. Owing to their birth and their race, all Jews belong to an international conspiracy against National Socialist Germany. They wish for its defeat and annihilation and do all that is in their power to help bring that about.") The Reich Press Office ordered newspapers to report the speech as a front-page story, and it was widely broadcast on the radio. Goebbels justified the violence towards the Jews as a preemptive strike against the extreme violence that they supposedly planned to unleash upon Germany. Characteristically for Nazi propaganda, the justification of mass killing was combined with absence of information on how it was being carried out. Goebbels used the word extermination (Vernichtung) to refer to what the Soviet Union intended to do if it won the war, referring to the murder of the German intelligentsia. A few minutes later, he used the same word to refer to what the Germans were doing to the Jews. Herf suggests that some listeners interpreted "gradual process" to mean death from starvation or exposure, rather than immediate murder by shooting or in death camps.

=== War against the United States ===
On 11 December 1941, Germany declared war on the United States in the wake of the Pearl Harbor attack. The next day, Hitler gave a speech in the Reich Chancellery to Nazi Party leaders. Hitler discussed the Pearl Harbor attack and the Nazi war on the Eastern Front, expressing his expectation of a glorious future after Germany's eventual victory. Then he referenced his prophecy, saying:

Regarding the Jewish question, the Führer is determined to settle the matter once and for all. He prophesied that if the Jews once again brought about a world war, they would experience their extermination. This was not an empty phrase. The world war is here. The extermination of the Jews must be its necessary consequence. This question must be viewed without any sentimentality. We are here not to express sympathy for the Jews, but only to express sympathy for our own German people. As the German people again has sacrificed 160,000 dead in the eastern campaign, so the originators of this conflict must pay with their own lives.

Kershaw writes that Hitler's tone was "more menacing and vengeful than ever". Herf notes that the speech further emphasized the causal connection between the war and the Holocaust. According to Longerich, Hitler intended to indicate that the systematic murder of Jews that was already underway in the Soviet Union, Poland, and Serbia, should be continued and extended. Historian Christian Gerlach writes that Hitler "never before [referred to his prophecy] as clearly, as unambiguously"; Gerlach argues that this meeting was Hitler's announcement of his decision to murder all of the Jews in Europe. According to Evans, the theory that Hitler gave the order at this point has been rejected in favor of the theory that Nazi decision-making evolved gradually over time. Browning writes that "Hitler gave no explicit order but made unmistakably clear that his prophecy... had to be taken utterly literally".

On 16 December, Nazi official Hans Frank repeated the prophecy in similar words to those Hitler had used five days earlier, adding: "What is to happen to the Jews? Do you believe they’ll be accommodated in village settlements in the Ostland? They said to us in Berlin: why are you giving us all this trouble? ... Liquidate them yourselves!... We must destroy the Jews wherever we find them." According to Frank, the war could not be considered a complete success unless the Jews were exterminated. Without receiving a written order from Hitler, he understood that the Jews were to be exterminated, although the details had not been worked out at that time.

=== 30 January 1942 speech ===
Ten days after the Wannsee Conference at which the Final Solution was discussed, Hitler spoke at the Sportpalast for the ninth anniversary of the Nazi seizure of power. He characterized the war as a "fight for the whole of Europe and, thereby, for the whole of civilized humanity" and a race war between Jews and "Aryans" before referencing the prophecy (Note: "I already stated on 1 September 1939 in the German Reichstag that this war will not come to an end as the Jews imagine, with the extermination of the European-Aryan peoples, but that the result of this war will be the annihilation of Jewry. For the first time the old Jewish law will now be applied: an eye for an eye, a tooth for a tooth...") and added, "The hour will come, when the most evil enemy of the world of all time will have played his last part in Europe for at least a thousand years." The speech was widely covered in the press and, according to Security Service reports, was understood to mean that "the Führer’s fight against the Jews is being fought mercilessly to the end, and that soon the last Jews will have been driven from European soil". The reports also indicate that Germans had a stronger reaction to other issues raised in the speech than the prophecy. Winkler writes that the speech is a paraphrase of Revelation 20 "to convince the Germans of the greatness of their mission in history" in saving Europe from the Jews. According to Longerich, Hitler intended to emphasize that the fate of the Jews would be inextricably connected to the progress of the war.

=== 24 February 1942 speech ===
On 24 February, the anniversary of the founding of the Nazi Party, Hitler was not present for the ceremony. He instructed Gauleiter Adolf Wagner to read a statement, in which Hitler implied that even if the war was lost, his prophecy would be fulfilled. (Note: "My prophecy will be fulfilled that in this war not the Aryans will be exterminated but the Jew will be eradicated. Whatever the battle will bring, or how long it may last, this will be the ultimate legacy of this war. And then finally, after the elimination of these parasites, will there come to a suffering world a long period of brotherhood among nations and true peace.") A paragraph was quoted in Niedersächsische Tageszeitung the next day, under the heading "The Jew is being exterminated". On 27 February, a related article appeared in Völkische Beobachter under the heading "The Jew will be exterminated!" The article opens by referring to Hitler's prophecy, and accuses Jews, the "eternal murderers of world peace", of plotting the destruction of the German people. The speech was quoted in a Der Stürmer article of 19 March 1942 titled "The Coming End – the Führer's Prophecy", which explained that the prophecy made clear how the Jewish question would be resolved. (Note: "How this solution will come about was made clear to the whole non-Jewish world by the Führer of the German People in a proclamation to the peoples of Europe read out on 24 February 1942: 'Today the ideas of our National Socialist and the fascist revolution have conquered great and powerful states, and my prophecy will be fulfilled that through this war the Jews, not Aryan mankind, will be annihilated.'") The article coincided with the third and fourth waves of deportations of Jews from Germany that occurred very publicly from March to June 1942 and effectively eliminated the Jewish presence in Germany.

=== Goebbels diary entry ===
In March 1942, Goebbels wrote in his diary about the gassing of Jews in the Lublin District of occupied Poland. It was the most detail that he ever devoted to the murder of Jews. Goebbels wrote that Jews under German rule were paying for the war effort of the Allied powers:

A judgment is being visited upon the Jews which, barbaric as it is, they have fully deserved. The Führer’s prophecy of the fate in store for them if they started another world war is beginning to come true in the most terrible manner. In these matters, one must not give way to sentimentality. If we did not fight them, the Jews would destroy us. It is a life-and-death struggle between the Aryan race and the Jewish bacillus.

In a closed-door meeting with party leaders in the Reich Chancellery on 23 May, Hitler said (according to Goebbels) "that the Jews are determined under all circumstances to bring this war to victory for them, since they know that defeat also means for them personal liquidation". Kershaw writes that this is a more direct version of the prophecy and Hitler was "unmistakably and explicitly linking [the prophecy]... with the physical liquidation of the Jews".

=== "They Will Stop Laughing!!!" ===
On 30 September 1942, Hitler delivered another speech at the Sportpalast. He reassured his audience that the worst of the war was over. In "the most menacing phrases he had so far used", Hitler stated that the extermination of Jews was revenge for Allied bombing. (Note: "On September 1, 1939, in the meeting of the Reichstag I said two things. First, after we were forced into this war, neither the power of weapons nor the factor of time would defeat us; second, if Jewry unleashes an international world war in order to bring about the extermination (Ausrottung) of the Aryan peoples of Europe, then it will be not the Aryan peoples, but rather Jewry, that will be exterminated [long applause]. The wire pullers of the lunatic in the White House have dragged one people after another into the war. In the same measure, however, an anti-Semitic wave has flooded over the peoples. It will move further and seize one state after another that enters this war. Each will emerge from it one day as an anti-Semitic state.") He added:

The Jews in Germany once laughed about my prophecies. I don't know if they are laughing today or if the laughter has already gone out of them. I can promise only one thing. They will stop laughing everywhere. And with this prophecy as well I will be proved right.

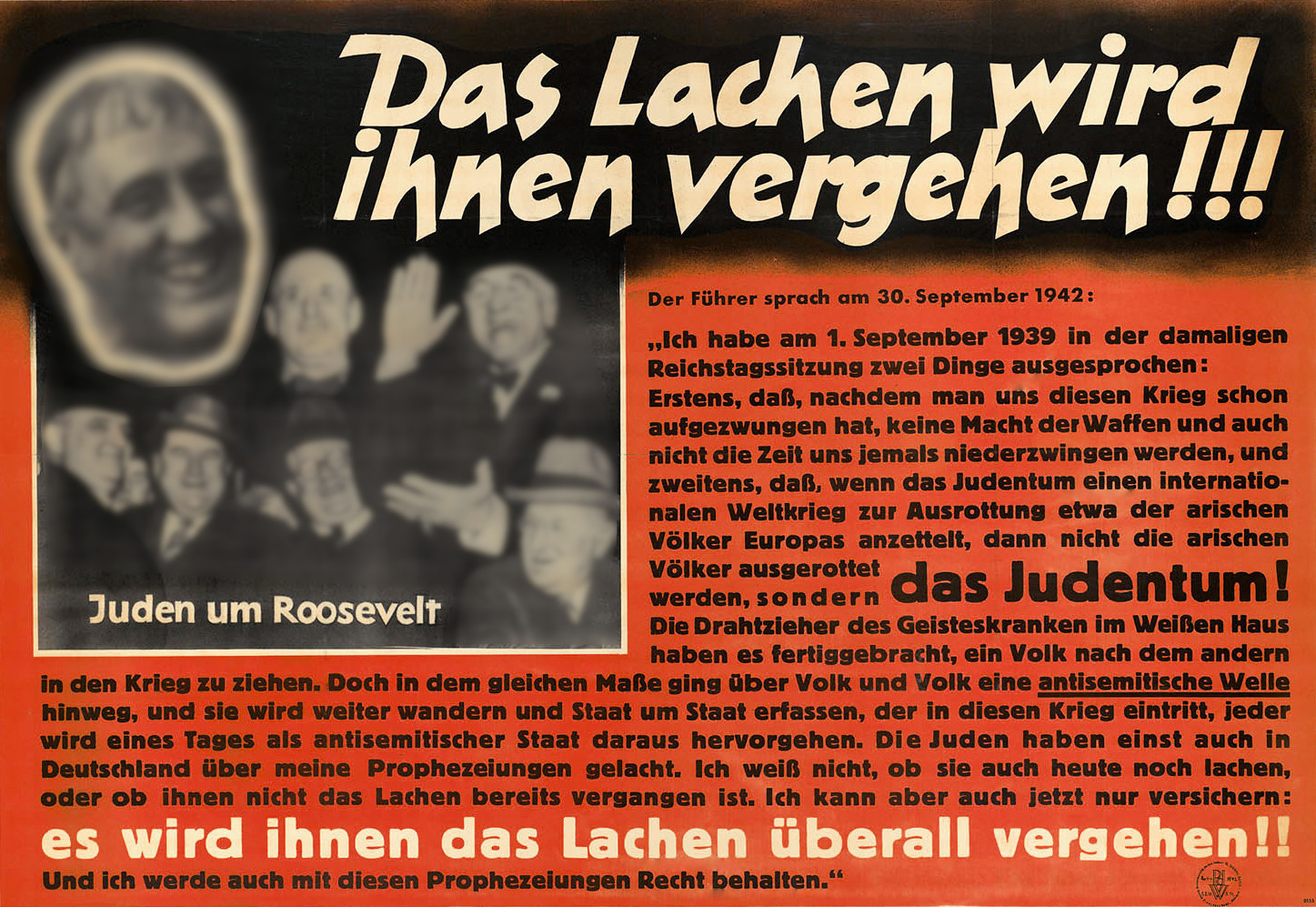
"They Will Stop Laughing!!!", 28 November 1942 issue of Parole der Woche

The audience responded with enthusiasm; Herf contends that Nazi loyalists realized that the speech referred to the systematic murder of Jews. As for Hitler's reference to the Jews not laughing anymore, Herf argues that "[a]ny benign interpretation... strains credulity". Herf stated that the audience may have understood Hitler's addition of "everywhere" to his promise to end Jewish laughter to mean the globalization of the Final Solution. He concludes that "all indicated that he had ordered and was then implementing the destruction of the Jews". The speech was broadcast on the radio, reported to the army, and featured prominently in the press.

Six weeks later, quotes from the speech were reproduced in an article titled "They Will Stop Laughing!!!" in Parole der Woche, a wall newspaper which frequently printed antisemitic content. The newspaper emphasized a laughing Franklin Roosevelt and his supposed Jewish advisers; "They will stop laughing everywhere!!" was reproduced in large type at the bottom of the page. About 125,000 copies of the newspaper were printed and posted in public places to be viewed by millions of people. Herf acknowledges that there is no reliable evidence as to "how many people had the intellectual curiosity, political acumen, and moral courage to conclude that this wall newspaper was an announcement of mass murder".

=== 8 November 1942 speech ===
On 8 November, during Hitler's annual speech for the Nazi Party old guard to commemorate the Beer Hall Putsch, he discussed the war in which Germany had recently suffered reversals (at Stalingrad and in Africa), and stated that there would be no negotiated peace. He referenced his prophecy and said that the result of the war would be "the extermination of Jewry in Europe". (Note: "National Socialist prophecies are not empty phrases. This is the key power that is the source of all our misfortune: international Jewry. You will recall the Reichstag session in which I stated: If Jewry imagines itself to be able to lead an international world war to exterminate the European races, then the result will not be the extermination of the European races but rather the extermination of Jewry in Europe! [applause] The Jews always laughed at me as a prophet. Those who were laughing then are laughing no longer. Those who are still laughing will in a short time perhaps also no longer be laughing...") Hitler said that the enemy was the same one that Nazis had faced under the Weimar Republic. He argued that Germany lost World War I because it did not understand the great danger posed by internal enemies and the Jews; Nazi Germany would win its war against the "half-Jew Roosevelt" because it had been enlightened. Hitler's rhetoric was out of touch with reality, and had only a superficial effect on listeners according to Security Service reports. Herf argues that what Hitler meant was evident to listeners: "The Jews had intended to 'exterminate'—that is, to kill—the Europeans" and in return the "Nazi regime was in the process of exterminating—that is, killing—the Jews". In Herf's opinion, the most believable interpretation of the Jews no longer laughing was that "something of a catastrophic nature was being done to them". The applause indicated that the audience approved of Hitler's "justified retaliation against Germany’s greatest enemy".

=== 1943 ===
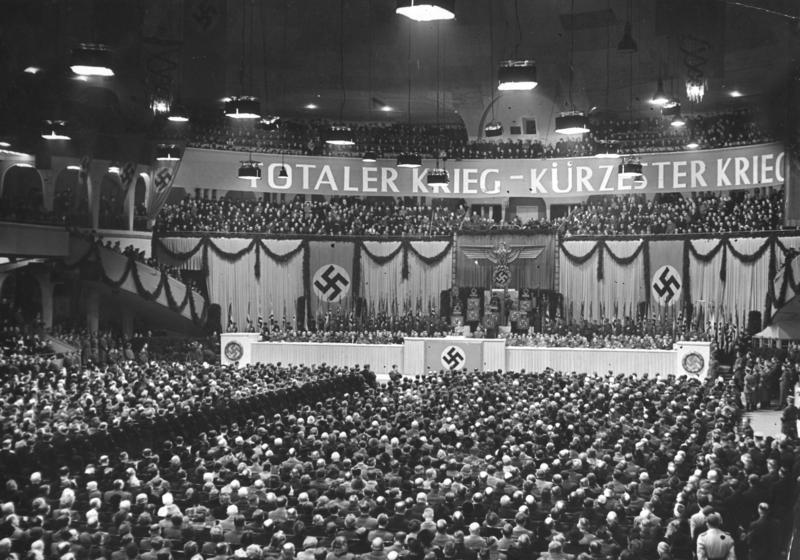
Nazi rally on 18 February 1943 at the Berlin Sportpalast; the sign says "Total War – Shortest War".

On 18 February 1943, Goebbels delivered the total war speech at the Sportpalast. According to Herf, the enthusiastic audience reception to Goebbels' calls for total war against the Jewish–Bolshevik enemy indicated that Nazi loyalists still agreed with the prophecy.

On 8 May 1943, Goebbels wrote an article titled "The War and the Jews":

None of the Führer’s prophetic words has come so inevitably true as his prediction that if Jewry succeeded in provoking a second world war, the result would be not the destruction of the Aryan race, rather the wiping out of the Jewish race. This process is of vast importance, and will have unforeseeable consequences that will take time. But it cannot be halted.

The article reached thousands of readers and millions of radio listeners. According to Herf, the piece "repeated and elaborated on the essential projection mechanism of Nazi propaganda"—that Jews were plotting the extermination of Germans. Goebbels interwove the actual systematic murder of the Jewish population with a big lie of an international Jewish conspiracy which controlled the Allies and had started the war. Goebbels wrote that he was satisfied with the reception of the article and planned to increase the use of antisemitism as a propaganda tactic, as he found it second only to Bolshevism in effectiveness. On 18 May, the propaganda ministry delivered copies of "Twilight for the Jews All over the World!" to Nazi officials. The article cited Goebbels' repetition of Hitler's prophecy, adding that antisemitism was rising throughout the world because people had begun to understand that "all the suffering, privations, and deprivation of this war are exclusively due to the Jews, that the war itself is the work of Juda."

=== 1944–1945 ===
Hitler continued to refer to his prophecy as the war went against Germany and used it to justify the conflict and its catastrophic consequences. Hitler's comments on the Final Solution also became more explicit; on 3 January 1944, he said that the outcome of the war was unresolved but the end of Jewish life in Europe was "beyond any doubt". On 26 May 1944, after the German invasion of Hungary, he addressed high-ranking army officers at the Berghof and said that if the opponents of Nazism prevailed, "Bolshevism would slaughter millions and millions and millions of our intellectuals. Anyone not dying through a shot in the neck would be deported. The children of the upper classes would be taken away and eliminated. This entire bestiality has been organized by the Jews." He described the bombing of Hamburg and dubbed the Hungarian Jewish community as "a seamless web of agents and spies" that undermined its country. Hitler declared that the Jews would be destroyed, just as he had predicted, and this was received well by the audience.

Hitler mentioned his prophecy in his brief New Year's speech, broadcast on the radio shortly after midnight on 1 January 1945, during a diatribe against the "Jewish international war conspiracy". According to historian Nicholas Stargardt, the speech did not comfort its listeners but stoked their fear that there would not be a negotiated peace. On 13 February, Hitler reportedly said "I have fought openly against the Jews. I gave them a last warning at the outbreak of war. I never left them in uncertainty that if they were to plunge the world into war again they would this time not be spared—that the vermin in Europe would be finally eradicated." In his last will and testament, signed shortly before his suicide, Hitler wrote that the true meaning of his prophecy of 1939 was "to exterminate the vermin throughout Europe". (Note: He added: "I also left no doubt that, if the nations of Europe are again to be regarded as mere blocks of shares of these international money and finance conspirators, then that race, too, which is really guilty of this murderous struggle, will be called to account: Jewry! I further left no one in doubt that this time millions of children of Europe’s aryan peoples would not die of hunger, millions of grown men would not suffer death, and hundreds of thousands of women and children not be burnt and bombed to death in the towns, without the real culprit having to atone for his guilt, even if by my more humane means.")

== Analysis ==
=== Reception by Germans ===
The threat to annihilate the Jews is the best-known phrase from Hitler's speeches. Kershaw writes that during the Holocaust (between 1941 and 1945), all Nazi leaders were aware of Hitler's prophecy, which was a "key metaphor for the 'Final Solution' ". Confino writes that "There was only one prophecy in wartime German society, and it meant one thing"; the prophecy emerged as "a common, shared, universal idiom among Germans and Jews" for the ongoing genocide. He argues that the prophecy reflected the antisemitism already prevalent in German society. Koonz writes that Hitler's public prediction of the extermination of Jews in January 1939 indicated his belief that the public would acquiesce to draconian methods against the Jews. She argues that his assessment was correct.

=== "Annihilation" ===
The interpretation of the prophecy is debated between the schools of functionalism and intentionalism, which differ in the degree to which they hold that the Holocaust was planned in advance by Hitler versus emerging from the Nazi bureaucracy. Early historians of Nazi Germany, such as Helmut Krausnick and Gerald Reitlinger, were convinced that Hitler had already plotted the genocide since the 1920s, and it was therefore unnecessary to prove a direct connection between the speech and the killings. In the 1960s, the school of functionalism emerged, which characterized Hitler as a weak dictator and argued that anti-Jewish policy emerged from Nazi functionaries as the war continued. In the 1990s, attention shifted back to Hitler's role, but this time arguing that he made the decision in 1941.

A key issue is what was meant, or understood, by "annihilation" (Vernichtung) in 1939. Historian Sarah Gordon suggests that Hitler chose the word (also translated "the end" or "destruction") for its vagueness, as he wanted to frighten the Jews into emigrating without explicitly calling for murder, which the reaction to Kristallnacht indicated that the German public opposed. Confino writes that "no one in Germany knew exactly what the word meant or how this metaphor of 'annihilation' would come to pass". He suggests that it evoked Kristallnacht and its burning synagogues, not the gas chambers of Auschwitz or the mass graves at Babi Yar (which did not exist yet). Confino contends that although not even Hitler knew what he meant by "annihilation", the speech demonstrated that Hitler and his listeners already envisioned "a world in which extreme violence was applied to get rid of Jews and eliminate Judaism".

==== Genocide ====
Intentionalists emphasize the importance of the speech and cite it as proof that the genocide had been planned before the war and did not gradually emerge. Lucy Dawidowicz highlighted the speech as Hitler's decision to commence the genocide, and argued that the German people should have understood it as a prior announcement of the Final Solution. Historian Stefan Kley notes that if Hitler had indeed expressed in 1939 a decisive intention to commit genocide, this would confirm intentionalist assumptions about Hitler's decisive role and rebut functionalist arguments.

Herf believes that the prophecy was Hitler's "first unequivocal public threat to exterminate (that is, murder)—not merely to remove, deport, or defeat"—Europe's Jews. Historian Shlomo Aronson described the statement as a public threat to murder the Jews and a declaration of his intention to do so, as he was already planning the war. Historian Gerhard Weinberg argues that "the murder of Jews would be an integral part of the war on which [Hitler] had already decided". Historian Daniel Goldhagen views the speech as a declaration of Hitler's aspiration and his intent, if he had the opportunity but not a defined program that would immediately be operational. Historian Robert Wistrich argues that the prophecy "was an extraordinary outburst from the leader of a great power and can hardly be reduced to a mere 'metaphor' or a piece of Utopian rhetoric... The vehemence with which Hitler delivered this particular section of his speech, and the frenzied applause of the Reichstag delegates, makes it plain that it was a deadly serious threat."

==== Emigration or expulsion ====
Functionalist scholars tend to emphasize the tactical implications of the speech in holding the Jews in Germany hostage against the behavior of the United States during the coming war, although they acknowledge that the speech establishes a mental connection between war and annihilation. One indication against this interpretation is that Hitler referred to "European Jews" rather than "German Jews".

The historian Christopher Browning said in an interview that during the 1939 speech Hitler intended to tell his followers that in the event of war, the Jews would be expelled from Europe. Browning said that the speech has to be considered in light of the anti-Jewish policies of the next two years, rather than with the retrospective knowledge of Auschwitz. Browning also wrote that the anti-Jewish policies pursued by the Nazis from 1939 to early 1941 (before the Final Solution), would have resulted in a great reduction in the Jewish population and argues that this would have been viewed as fulfilling the prophecy. The historian Mark Roseman contends that "there is no evidence that mass extermination was being planned in 1939" and points out that Hitler did not emphasize his prophecy in 1940. He asserts that it is impossible to know what Hitler's intent was in 1939 based on the prophecy. He also argues that it is unclear whether "annihilation" referred to expulsion or mass murder and points out that Hitler repeatedly spoke of the forcible banishment of the Jews from Germany.

Koonz writes that Germans at the time may have thought that the prophecy's "annihilation" was no more than a metaphor, "as in to 'smash' or 'wipe out' a rival". Bytwerk argues that it is neither necessary or reasonable to conclude that Hitler's prophecy, taken in context, referred to literal killings. Mommsen describes the prophecy as no more than "a rhetorical gesture designed to put pressure on the international community" to allow the immigration of German Jews: "At that time it was highly unlikely that either the German or the international public could have interpreted his statement as an ill-concealed declaration of a serious intention to liquidate the Jews under German rule in the event of war."

==== Multiple meanings ====
Bauer interprets the prophecy as expressing Hitler's determination to get rid of the German Jews. His first choice to resolve the situation was by international agreement that would lead to emigration, then a forcible, violent expulsion. A war, which the Nazi leadership was planning at the time, was another way that Jews might be eliminated. Bauer concludes that "while the Nazi aim was fixed—no Jews in the expanding Reich—the means could be varied" and that although Nazi leaders may have considered physical extermination as a means, there was no concrete plan to that effect in 1939.

Jersak argues that "Hitler planned to expel the Jews from Germany before he planned to conquer Lebensraum": Hitler issued orders from 1937 to 1939 aimed at speeding Jewish emigration. Jersak argues that if Germany became involved in a world war, Hitler recognized that the Axis would not emerge victorious. Therefore, he considered the systematic killing of Jews a "radical alternative" in case he did not get his way in the war. In this situation, "war would serve as a cover for extermination and the fighting would conceal the real war aim"—the murder of the Jews. Jersak cites Hitler's 1939 statement "Who remembers the extermination of the Armenians?" as evidence that Hitler believed that crimes committed during wartime would be overlooked. Longerich writes that Hitler's prophecy "had several potential layers of meaning", of which the first was Hitler's tactical desire to frighten Jews into emigration.

=== War ===
==== Jewish conspiracy ====
Hitler's "prophecy" of January 30, 1939, comprised the core of Nazism’s narrative of World War II. A historical subject called "international Jewry" had launched World War II with the intent of bringing about the "Bolshevization" of the world. It would fail. Instead, Nazi Germany would retaliate for this aggression and annihilate the Jews. It would wage a "war" against the Jews in response to the "war" the Jews had started. This reversed logic of self-righteous retaliation constituted the core of Nazi antisemitic propaganda between 1939 and 1945.

— Jeffrey Herf

Longerich views the 1939 speech as part of a long-term strategy to blame the upcoming war on the Jews. In February 1939, Himmler advanced the timing for the upcoming world war, estimating that it would occur soon rather than in the next decade because of the backlash to Kristallnacht. In notes for a speech, he wrote, "Radical solution of the Jewish problem is prompting Jewry to fight us, if necessary by unleashing a world war." Longerich sees a clear link to Hitler's speech. Gerlach wrote that the prophecy was self-fulfilling because in Hitler's nationalistic mindset, any opposition to Nazism was viewed as the work of an international Jewish conspiracy. Hitler and Nazi leaders believed that the Jewish conspiracy was real. The prophecy was also believed literally by many Germans. Victor Klemperer was confronted by Germans, even non-Nazis, who told him that Jews had started the war and deserved their fate.

Herf notes that as Hitler plotted war in 1939, "he ordered his propagandists to assert that exactly the opposite was taking place". Herf also writes, "Invisible to those lacking the insight provided by Nazi ideology, this conspiracy was perceived by Hitler and his henchmen as the driving force of modern history... When the major powers opposed Nazi Germany, they were doing so as Judenknechte, or servants of the Jews." This conspiracy theory violates chronology and causality and makes contradictory claims of a master race dominating the world versus the Germans as innocent victims attacked by a powerful Jewish conspiracy. Historian Antony Beevor writes that the prophecy's "breathtaking confusion of cause and effect lay at the heart of Hitler's network of lies and self-deception".

==== Strategic considerations ====
Historian David Reynolds argues that Hitler may well have been thinking partly of Roosevelt when he made the 1939 speech. At the time, the United States president was trying to persuade Americans to abandon isolationism and was promoting the emigration of Jews from Europe. Weinberg contends that, at the time of the prophecy speech, Hitler regretted allowing Neville Chamberlain to avert war in 1938, and was determined to go to war before 1940. According to Weinberg, Hitler already planned to use the war to cause a worldwide demographic revolution, of which the systematic murder of Jews was to be a crucial part. Herf argues that in his speeches referencing the prophecy, Hitler made it clear that he saw a "causal and inherent, not a contingent or accidental, connection with his intent to exterminate the Jews". Kershaw writes that "the 'prophecy' denoted the indelible link in [Hitler's] mind between war and revenge against the Jews". Koonz writes that in his 1939 speech, "Hitler posed as the sole moral arbiter of his Volk [nation] at war on two fronts: racial and geopolitical".

==== Hostages ====
According to Longerich, Hitler's reference to "international Jewish financiers" envisioned circumstances that the United States and other western powers intervened to prevent German expansionism in Europe, to which Hitler was already committed. If that happened, the "international Jewish financiers" would be blamed for the resulting war and Jews remaining in Germany would be held as hostages threatened with annihilation. If emigration failed and the Western powers prevented Hitler from pursuing irredentism, or joined a continental European war, all options were being kept open for further intensification of the Nazi anti-Jewish policy. Evans cites the Nazi belief in an international Jewish conspiracy to argue that Hitler's aim was to hold the Jews hostage to prevent American entry into the war. If America did so, the Jews throughout Europe would be murdered.

According to Mommsen, because Nazis believed in an international Jewish conspiracy that supposedly controlled the world's governments, it made sense to threaten the Jews in Germany to obtain the compliance of other countries. Aronson also views the threat as "aimed at the West", where the Jews were held hostage to ensure that Hitler could deal with each of the countries separately. Roseman writes that Hitler hoped that by holding German Jews hostage, their brethren in other countries could be controlled. Kershaw states that the prophecy was in part aimed at preventing United States entry into the war "through the threat of what would then happen to the Jews of Europe". Jersak argues that the speech served as an "early warning to the US not to interfere in Europe. The idea that American Jews in Germany could serve as hostages against another US participation in a possible European war was probably also born at this time." Stargardt writes that the idea of controlling the United States with Jewish hostages was in play as late as September 1941, when the Wochenspruch poster was issued. When the United States entered the war, the Jews lost their value as hostages and could be killed with impunity.

==== World war ====
Bauer writes "the war that Hitler wanted"—to ally with Poland in an invasion of the Soviet Union—"was not the one he got in September 1939". Even after concluding the Molotov–Ribbentrop Pact, Hitler attempted to avoid a two-front war by keeping the United Kingdom, United States, and possibly France out of the war. At the time, Germans used the phrase "world war" for any major conflict between the European powers.

Goldhagen writes that the invasion of the Soviet Union was an opportunity for Hitler "to make good on his promise" in the prophecy. Bytwerk writes that in wartime "the word 'destruction' takes on a physical connotation missing in peace". By invoking the prophecy during the war, Hitler made it clear "that he was absolutely serious about his threat to destroy the Jews". Jersak argues that "the campaign against the Soviet Union turned into a war against the Jews" at the same time as prospects for German victory dimmed; from September 1941, anti-Jewish actions were not just justified but also motivated by fear of the Jewish conspiracy. Kershaw writes that the war and Hitler's mission to get rid of Jews "reached its fateful point of convergence in the conception of the 'war of annihilation' against the Soviet Union".

Kershaw writes that the prophecy "was evidently never far from [Hitler's] mind" during the winter campaign of 1941–42 and it was "at the forefront of his thoughts in the wake of Pearl Harbor". According to Jersak, around the same time, Hitler decided to murder "the last Jew on European soil", which Nazis believed "would break the 'subversive power' of 'International Jewry'". Browning argues against this explanation, noting that the systematic murder of Jews was already taking place in the Soviet Union and Hitler's prophecy was not "tied to a 'world war' defined by American involvement". Longerich writes that Hitler's speech of 12 December 1941 "appears to contain nothing really new" but, as Germany was now engaged in a world war, the "'prophecy' inevitably came closer to its realization".

==== Blame for war destruction ====
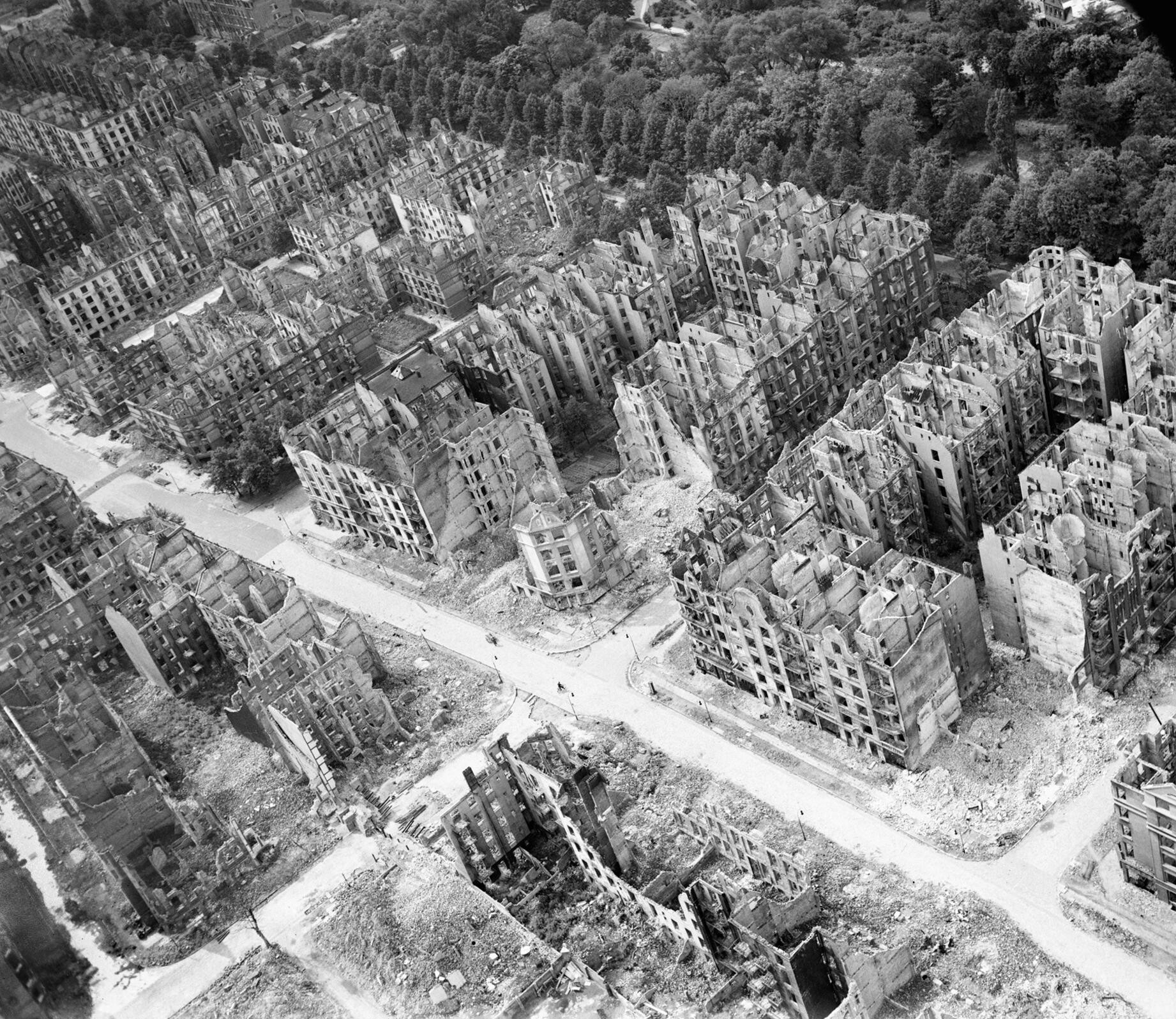
Results of the bombing of Hamburg. The Jews were to blame, according to Nazi propagandists.

By the winter of 1941–1942, Allied military action, especially strategic bombing, was killing an increasing number of German soldiers and civilians. In Nazi propaganda—and, Herf argues, the opinion of many Germans—the Jews were held responsible for each death and they would be made to pay in kind. Herf argues that "for millions of Germans, the abstract slogan 'The Jews are guilty' assumed direct emotional significance." According to Kershaw, Hitler viewed the genocide of the Jews as "natural revenge for the destruction caused by the Jews – above all in the war which he saw as their work." When the Allies became aware of the systematic murder of Jews and denounced it, Hitler and other Nazi propagandists did not deny the reports. Instead, Herf states, they preferred to "present the Nazi attack on the Jews as a justified act of self-defense, retaliation, and revenge in response to the misfortunes the Jews had inflicted and were at that moment inflicting on Germany."

=== Communication ===
==== Hitler's role in the Holocaust ====
Hitler was the primary decision maker in the Holocaust but no written order to that effect has been discovered, and most historians argue that it never existed. Instead, Hitler probably gave verbal authorizations to important decisions regarding the Final Solution.

Kershaw contends that both intentionalist and functionalist interpretations of the prophecy are wrong. Although the Nazi extermination of the Jewish people was not fully realized until years later, he argues that the 1939 speech is crucial for understanding Hitler's role in the Final Solution and the prophecy is "a key both to Hitler’s mentality, and to the ways he provided 'directions for action'". He argues that Hitler's actions were mostly confined to the realm of propaganda, especially the prophecy, as it was "neither his style, nor his inclination" to involve himself with day-to-day details. The prophecy served as "the transmission belt between Hitler’s own inner conviction" that the war would result in the genocide of Europe's Jews and the murders carried out by his subordinates. Party insiders understood the invocation of the prophecy as a call to radical action against the Jews without explicit instructions. Kershaw argues that the repetition of the prophecy in mass media helped to "condition the general population against humanitarian sympathy" and signaled the intensification of the mass murder.

Jersak argues that "the hypothesis of an order for the murder of the European Jews unrelated to that prophecy assumes... that Hitler, who repeatedly referred to his prophecy, did not mean what he said". Historian Eberhard Jäckel writes that the repetition of the prophecy is "truly astounding and its motivation is not readily apparent". Jäckel speculates that Hitler's motivation may have been to indicate his approval of the mass murder or to "have the final solution put on the record". According to Roseman, Hitler's rhetoric, including the frequently repeated prophecy, let Holocaust perpetrators know that Hitler approved of their actions.

==== Vagueness ====
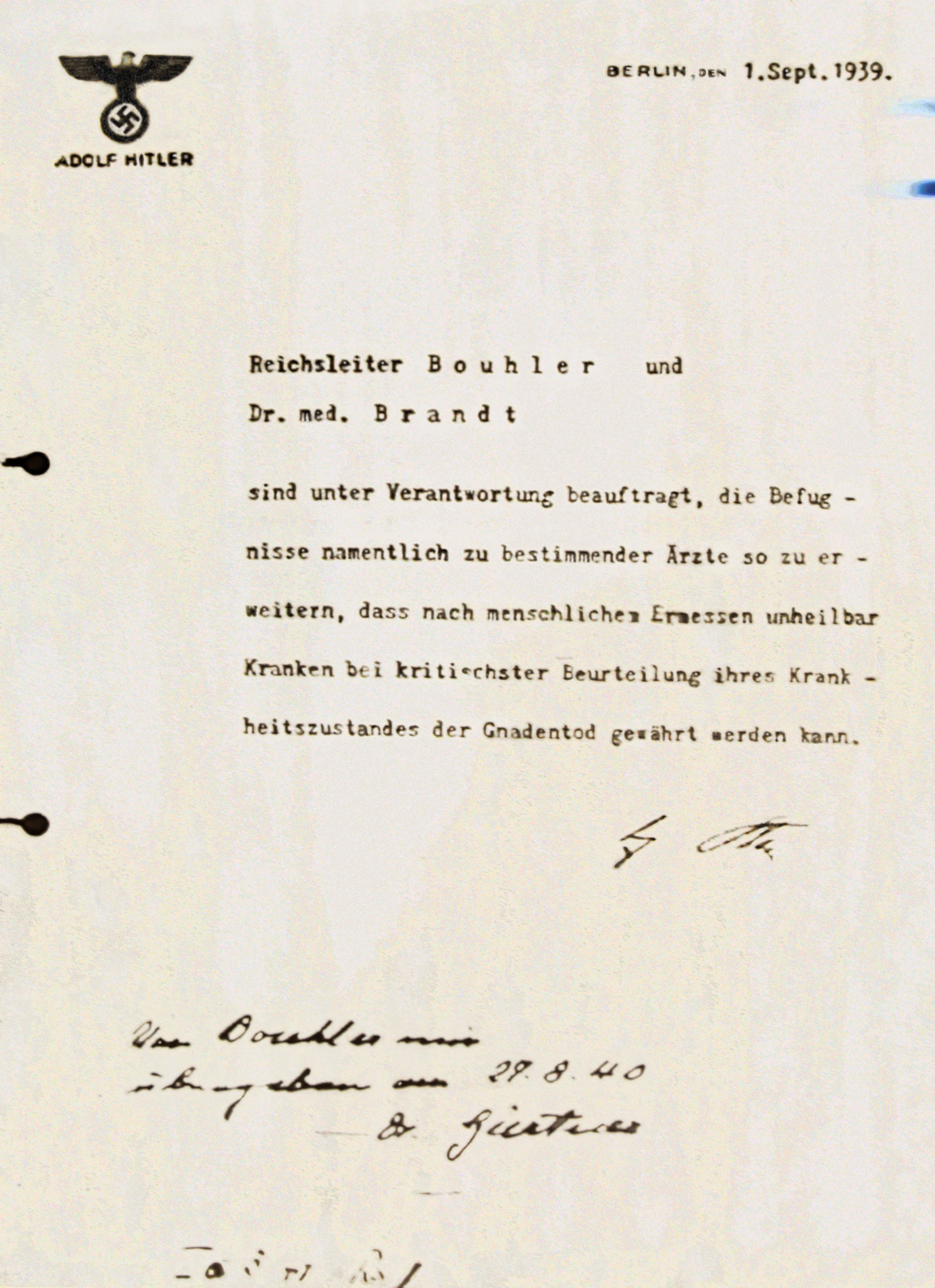
Hitler's order authorizing Aktion T4 led to opposition, which may have motivated his non-explicitness on the Holocaust.

Historian David Bankier notes that the prophecy "lacked a space or time frame and gave no details on how the Final Solution would be implemented. In his 'prophecy' the Jews would disappear without an agent". Beevor writes that "[d]espite his apocalyptic diatribes against the Jews" and efforts to promote violence, Hitler was "remarkably reluctant to hear details of mass killings". Herf describes Goebbels' article "The Jews are Guilty" as "a paradigm of Nazi anti-Semitic propaganda" because "the extremist language went along with a total absence of revealing details about where, when, and how this mass murder was taking place". In other words, it "left enough ambiguity and absence of detail to promote plausible deniability".

Kershaw writes that despite the "dark hints that his 'prophecy' was being fulfilled", Hitler tried to conceal his direct involvement in the Holocaust. Kershaw speculates "even at the height of his own power he feared theirs, and the possibility one day of their 'revenge'." Or, perhaps, Hitler believed that "German people were not ready to learn the deadly secret". Kershaw notes that when referring to the mass murder of Jews, Hitler either stated things that were no longer true, or otherwise "alluding to the removal of Jews from Europe (often in the context of his 'prophecy') at some distant point in the future". Kershaw adds that Hitler wanted to "lay claim to his place in 'the glorious secret of our history' while still detaching himself from the sordid and horrific realities of mass killing". Therefore, he never made any statement like Himmler's Posen speeches, even in private with other Nazi leaders. Hitler also wanted to avoid opposition from the bureaucracy or the judicial system, which he encountered after he signed an order for the euthanasia program. Himmler used the same strategy of vagueness when communicating about the fate of the Jews.

==== Knowledge of the Holocaust ====
After the war, many Germans claimed ignorance of the Nazi regime's crimes and argued that references to the "annihilation" of Jews had not been understood literally. Historians have disputed these claims. Koonz writes that the prophecy was one reason why "no bystander could deny the intention of the Nazi leadership to eradicate Jews, one way or another". References to the prophecy in mass media spread "an awareness, while avoiding detailed or explicit information, that the destruction of the Jews was inexorably taking place", according to Kershaw. Bankier writes that the prophecy "left no possible doubts that, in one way or another, the fate of the Jews would be physical obliteration". He adds that in openly declaring their aims, the Nazi leadership aimed to test the loyalty of ordinary Germans to the regime. Confino argues that Germans knew in general terms about the extermination of Europe's Jews, even if they did not know the details. Herf argues that when Hitler's prophecy was referenced in German mass media during the war, readers understood that the Jews had been declared "guilty" for the war and that the Nazi regime was carrying out its previously announced threat to exterminate them.

== Postwar ==
At the International Military Tribunal (1945–1946), Der Stürmer publisher Julius Streicher was convicted of crimes against humanity based on his "incitement to murder and extermination" of Jews. The judgment against him cited a January 1943 article he wrote praising Hitler for fulfilling his prophecy to extirpate the Jews.

In the Yad Vashem holocaust museum, the quote is given a prominent location, implying that Hitler had planned the Holocaust already in 1939.
