= Hitler and Mannerheim recording =

1942 recording of a conversation between Adolf Hitler and Gustaf Emil Mannerheim

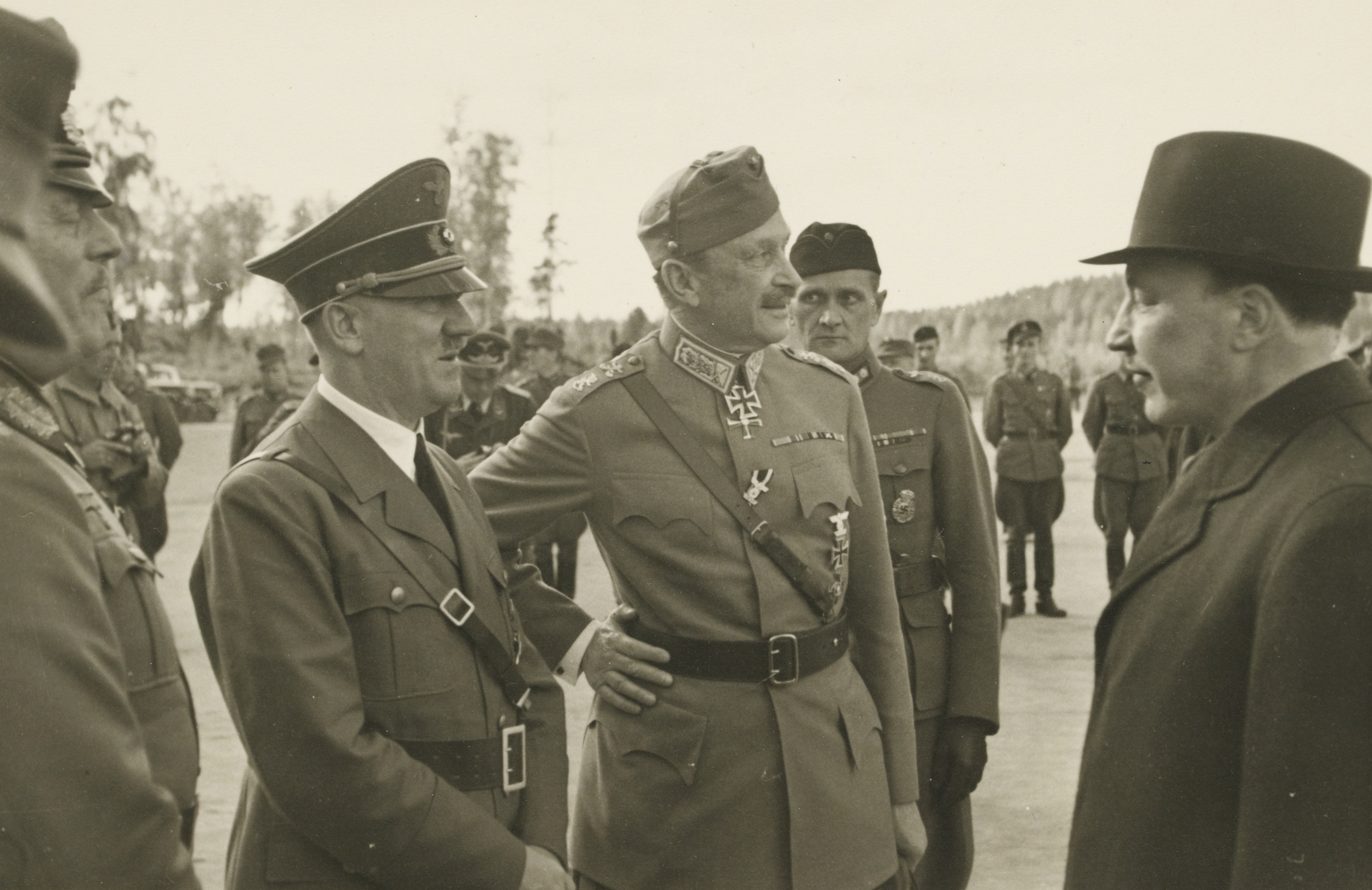
Wilhelm Keitel (left), Adolf Hitler, Carl Gustaf Emil Mannerheim, and President Risto Ryti in front of Hitler's private converted plane

A recording of a conversation between Adolf Hitler, the dictator of Nazi Germany, and Carl Gustaf Emil Mannerheim, the Commander-in-Chief of the Finnish Defence Forces, is the only known recording of Hitler speaking in an unofficial manner. The conversation took place on 4 June 1942, during a secret visit made to Finland by Hitler to honour Mannerheim's 75th birthday. Thor Damen, a sound engineer for the Finnish broadcaster Yleisradio (Yle), had been assigned to record the birthday celebrations, and recorded the first eleven minutes of Hitler and Mannerheim's conversation without permission. Damen was forced to cease recording after Hitler's SS guards told him to; they then demanded the tape be destroyed. Instead of destroying it, Yle was allowed to keep the tape in a sealed container if they promised that it would never be opened again. However, they later made the recording available to the public.

== Visit by Hitler ==
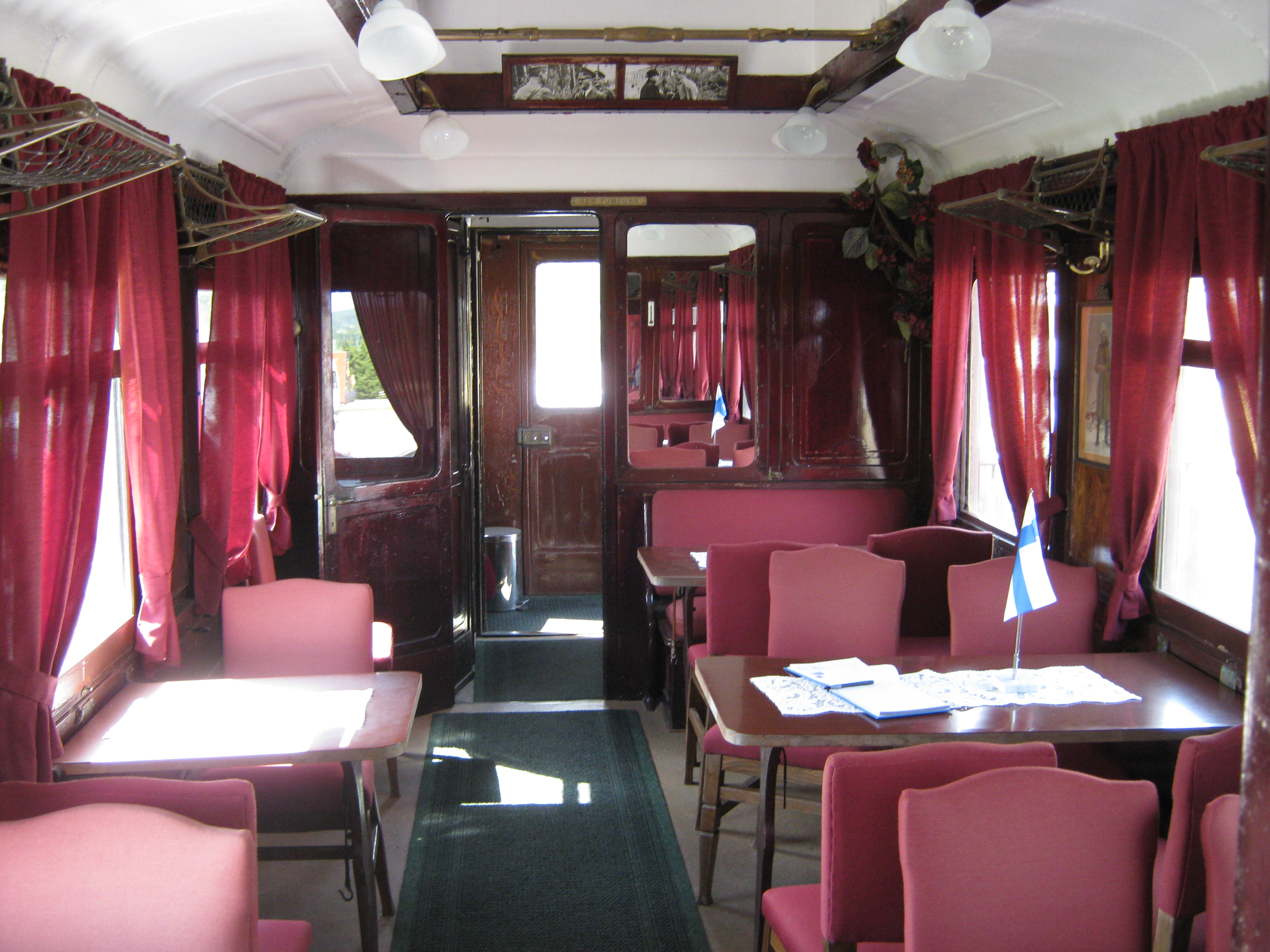
Interior of the saloon coach where the lunch was held

In June 1941, Nazi Germany invaded the Soviet Union. Despite the initial and overwhelming success of the campaign, the Soviets repelled the German assault on Moscow and stalled the German advance. Hitler required his allies – including Finland, which was fighting its second war with the Soviet Union in two years – to tie down as much of the enormous Soviet military machine as possible.

In 1942, Hitler, under extreme secrecy, visited Finland, officially to congratulate Mannerheim on his 75th birthday. Mannerheim did not wish to greet Hitler at his headquarters, as it would have appeared like a state visit. Therefore, the meeting occurred at Imatra in southern Finland. At Immola Airfield, Hitler was greeted and accompanied by President Risto Ryti and Finnish officials to Mannerheim's personal train, where a birthday meal and negotiations took place.

== Recording ==
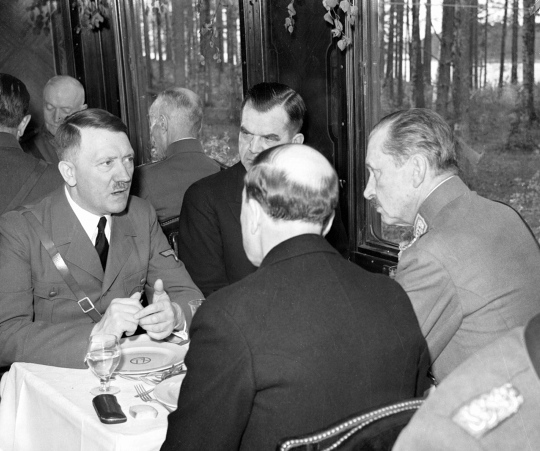
Hitler and Mannerheim talking in the train

After the official greetings and speeches had taken place, Hitler and Mannerheim, accompanied by other German and Finnish officials, entered Mannerheim's private wagon for cigars, drinks, and lunch. In this wagon, a large and visible microphone had been set up by Thor Damen, a sound engineer for the Finnish broadcaster Yleisradio (Yle), who had been assigned to record Hitler's official speech and birthday message to Mannerheim.

After the official speeches, Damen continued to record the now-private conversation, with Hitler unaware that the conversation was still being recorded. After eleven minutes, Hitler's SS guards realised what Damen was doing and made a cutthroat gesture to demand that he cease recording. The SS guards demanded the tape be destroyed, but Yle was allowed to keep the tape in a sealed container with the promise that it never be opened again. The tape was given to the head of the State Censors' Office, Kustaa Vilkuna, returned to Yle in 1957, and made publicly available a few years later. It is the only known recording of Hitler speaking in an unofficial tone and one of the very few recordings in which Hitler may be heard delivering a narrative without raising his voice.

== The conversation ==
While the official reason for Hitler's visit – which had been arranged just the day before – was to celebrate Mannerheim's birthday, Hitler's actual purpose was to ensure that Finland would remain allied to Nazi Germany by reiterating the dangers of Bolshevism, thereby preventing any Finnish feelers to either the Soviets or to the Western Allies. Hitler wanted to reassure himself that he had the Finns' continuing support.

On the tape, Hitler dominated the discussion, with others at the table – Mannerheim, Ryti, and Generalfeldmarschall Wilhelm Keitel – mostly silent. He is shocked by the production capability and fighting power of the Red Army, and expresses dismay regarding Italian defeats against the Allies. Hitler also discusses Operation Barbarossa and mentions the Soviet Foreign Minister's claim that Finland is a threat to the Soviet Union's existence. Hitler was at pains to present German policy as having been consistent throughout, but also emphasised that imminent Russian aggression had given him no choice but to attack the Soviets.

Aside from this broad summary of the war in the East, Hitler did not reveal any of his future military plans, specifically an upcoming German offensive, of which the Finns were informed only the day before it occurred – much to Mannerheim's exasperation. Despite Hitler's visit and monologue, and a return visit from Mannerheim, the Nazis' continuing military crisis over the next six months would provoke the Finns into looking for a way out of their alliance with Germany.

== Authenticity ==
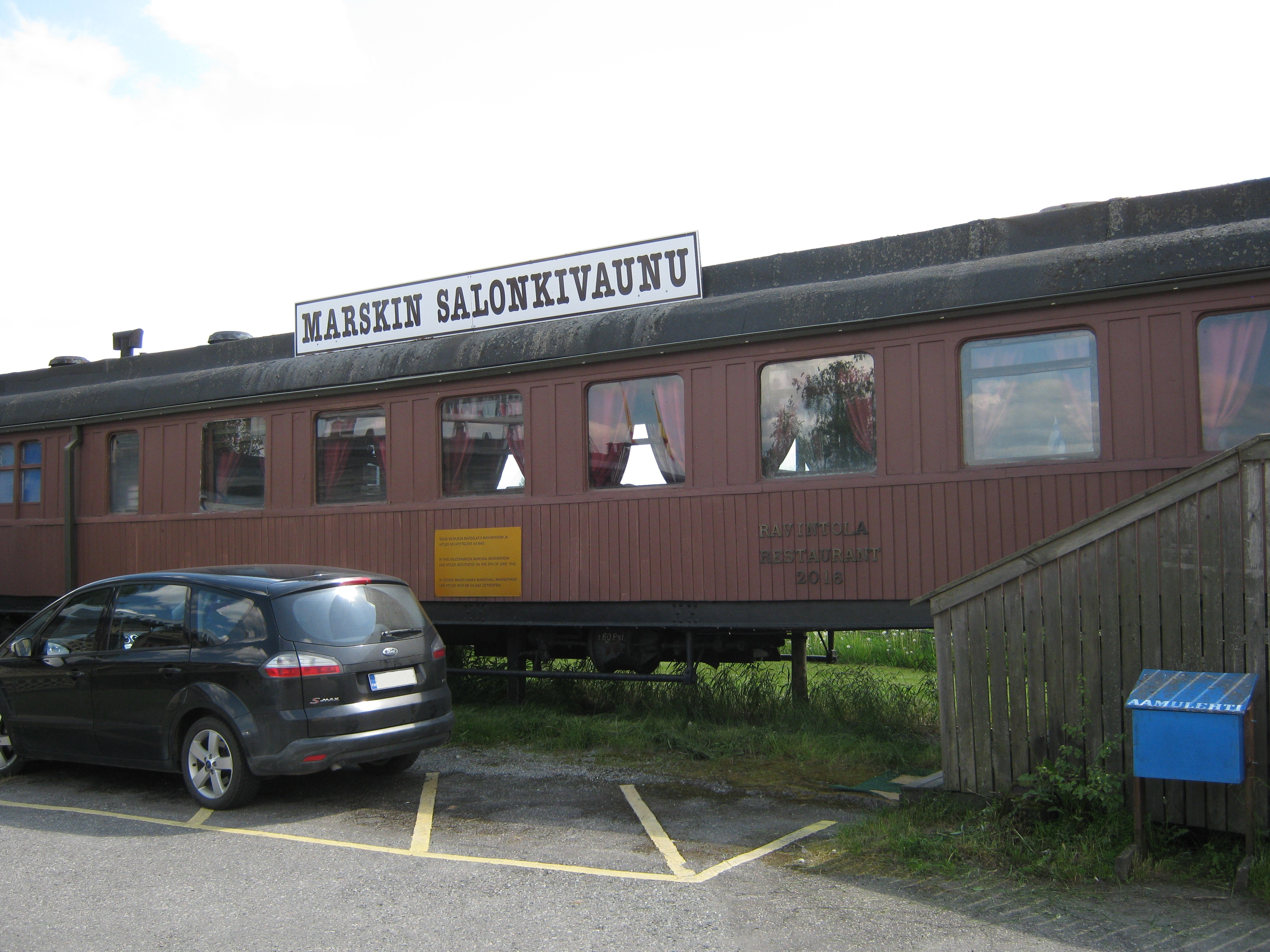
The carriage where the historical meeting took place is now a tourist attraction along the Highway 12 in Sastamala, Pirkanmaa.

After the tape was revealed to the public, some believed it was a fake because Hitler's voice sounded too soft. After listening to the recording, Rochus Misch, Hitler's former bodyguard and radio operator, said: "He is speaking normally, but I have problems with the tone; the intonation isn't quite right. Sometimes it seems okay, but at other points not. I have the feeling it's someone mimicking Hitler. It really sounds as if someone is mimicking him." Photographs taken on the day of the event showed that Hitler had been drinking alcohol, which could have affected his voice, as he rarely drank. Specialists from postwar Germany's Federal Criminal Police Office later examined the tape, and Head of Frequencies Stefan Gfroerer declared that it is "very obvious to us that this is Hitler's voice."

== In popular culture ==
- Mannerheim's saloon coach, where the meeting with Hitler took place, is displayed outside a Shell service station on Finnish national road 12 in Sastamala, Pirkanmaa. It has been open to the public since 1969. The private wagon, where the recording took place, is located in Mikkeli. It is open to the public only once a year, on 4 June, Mannerheim's birthday.
- The recording was used by Swiss actor Bruno Ganz when he rehearsed Hitler's manner of speaking for his role in the 2004 film Downfall.

== See also ==
- Diplomatic history of World War II
- Hitler's Stalingrad speech
- Hitler's Table Talk
- Mannerheim (family)
