= The Speeches of Adolf Hitler, April 1922 – August 1939 =

1942 text

A two-volume work titled The Speeches of Adolf Hitler, April 1922 – August 1939 was published by Oxford University Press in 1942 under auspices of the Royal Institute of International Affairs.

== Overview ==
The foreword is by the Chairman of the Council at the time, Waldorf Astor, 2nd Viscount Astor.

Being a collection of representative passages arranged under subjects, the speeches are neither complete, self-contained, nor necessarily in chronological order. Interviews with journalists are also included.

It was edited by Professor Norman Hepburn Baynes who translated from the German at times with a self-confessed difficulty due to a ‘diffuseness‘ in National Socialist terminology. Where authorised English translations existed, Baynes used these. Interviews published in French journals are quoted un-translated.

Baynes completed the task over a two-year period commencing with the outbreak of World War II and October 1941.

== Contents of the publication ==
- VOLUME I
- FOREWORD
- PREFACE
- LIST OF ABBREVIATIONS
- 1. EARLY SPEECHES 1922-1924
- 2. THE FORMATION OF THE PARTY: HITLER‘S RETROSPECT
- 3. THE PROGRAMME OF THE PARTY
- 4. THE EARLY DAYS OF THE PARTY
- 5. THE 'PUTSCH' OF 8-9 NOVEMBER 1923
- 6. LEGALITY
- 7. THE SA. AND SS.
  Note: The SA.
- 8. STEPS TO POWER
- 9. ORGANIZATION OF THE PARTY:THE MEANING OF THE ANNUAL GATHERINGS OF THE PARTY-THE PARTEITAGE
- 10. THE MODEL REVOLUTION
- 11. THE MOVEMENT AND THE OPPOSITION
- 12. GLEICHSCHALTUNG
- 13. THE ROEHM PURGE
- 14. RELIGION
  Note: The Treatment of Religion by Hitler in Mein Kampf.
- 15. CONSTITUTION
  Note: The Constitution of the National Socialist State.
- 16. CRITICISM AND LIBERTY
- 17. LAW
  Note on Law
- 18. WOMAN
- 19. YOUTH
- 20. THE ARMY
- 21. KULTUR
- 22. THE OUTLOOK FOR THE FUTURE: THE TASKS OF THE MOVEMENT
- 23. THE YEARS IN RETROSPECT AS HITLER SAW THEM
- 24. BOLSHEVISM
- 25. THE JEWS
  Note and Bibliography.
- 26. ECONOMICS
- VOLUME II
- 27. FOREIGN POLICY
  NOTES
  I. ADDENDA
  II. BIBLIOGRAPHICAL NOTE
  INDEXES
  I. INDEX OF SPEECHES
  II. LIST OF NAMES OF AUTHORS
  III. GENERAL INDEX

== See also ==
- List of books by or about Adolf Hitler
- List of Adolf Hitler speeches
