= 30 January 1939 Reichstag speech =

Speech by Adolf Hitler

Hitler addressing the Reichstag

On 30 January 1939, Adolf Hitler, dictator of Nazi Germany, gave a speech in the Kroll Opera House to the Reichstag delegates, which is best known for the prediction he made that "the annihilation of the Jewish race in Europe" would ensue if another world war were to occur.

Nazi propaganda minister Joseph Goebbels helped write the speech, which was delivered on the sixth anniversary of Hitler's seizure of power in 1933. The speech lasted two or two-and-a-half hours. It dealt with both the foreign and domestic policies of the Nazi government.

== Foreign policy ==
Hitler discussed the Munich crisis and admitted that he had planned a military invasion after the May Crisis in the event that Czechoslovakia did not capitulate to his demand to surrender the Sudetenland by 2 October 1938. Referencing "a serious blow to the prestige of the Reich" and an "intolerable provocation", Hitler claimed that the Sudetenland had been secured by German determination and willingness to resort to war, rather than by diplomacy. For the first time since Munich, Hitler hinted at further expansion, stating "how important the expansion of our people’s living space (Lebensraum) was in order to permanently secure their food supplies", as Germany currently had "to export in order to buy food". He complained that Germany was prevented from expanding by "the continuing blindness of the former victor powers". German history professor Longerich wrote that demanding "living space, while simultaneously stressing Germany’s commitment to peace, soon became part of the standard repertoire of German propaganda".

== Jews ==
Although the Évian Conference in July 1938 had failed to open other countries to Jewish emigrants, the Nazis still attempted to hasten the emigration of Jews from Germany. Discussions continued between Hermann Göring and George Rublee, director of the Intergovernmental Committee on Refugees. Hitler ridiculed "German businessmen devoid of any conscience" who felt sympathy for Jews. He complained that there was "enough space for settlement" in the world for German Jews to go, and contended that Europe could "not become pacified before the Jewish question has been settled". In a long rant against Jews, Hitler first mocked them, remarking at "how the whole democratic world [was] oozing with sympathy for the poor tormented Jewish People [and yet] remains hard-hearted when it comes to helping these supposedly most valuable members of the human race". He said that it was time to "wrestle the Jewish world enemy to the ground", and that the German government was completely determined "to get rid of these people".

Hitler accused Jews of having "nothing of their own, except for political and sanitary diseases" and being parasites on the German nation, turning Germans into "beggars in their own country". He asserted there had to be an end to the misconception that "the good Lord had meant the Jewish nation to live off the body and productive work of other nations", or else the Jews would "succumb to a crisis of unimaginable severity". Hitler claimed that the Jews were trying to incite "millions among the masses of people into a conflict that is utterly senseless for them and serves only Jewish interests". Hitler then arrived at his main point:

I have very often in my lifetime been a prophet and have been mostly derided. At the time of my struggle for power it was in the first instance the Jewish people who only greeted with laughter my prophecies that I would someday take over the leadership of the state and of the entire people of Germany and then, among other things, also bring the Jewish problem to its solution. I believe that this hollow laughter of Jewry in Germany has already stuck in its throat. I want today to be a prophet again: if international finance Jewry inside and outside Europe should succeed in plunging the nations once more into a world war, the result will be not the Bolshevization of the earth and thereby the victory of Jewry, but the annihilation of the Jewish race in Europe.

== Other topics ==
After speaking about the Jews, Hitler discussed the situation of the churches in Nazi Germany, threatening to effect a complete separation of church and state, which would have serious financial consequences for both Protestant and Catholic churches. He said that clergymen who abused children or criticized the government would not enjoy any immunity.

== Dissemination and reactions ==
Hitler's prediction about the Jews was reprinted in the party newspaper Völkischer Beobachter and in a dedicated pamphlet. The speech was broadcast live on radio. According to Goebbels' explicit instructions to Fritz Hippler, the part of the speech that included Hitler's threat against the Jews was recorded simultaneously as audio and video (a difficult technical achievement at the time) and included in the weekly UFA Wochenschau newsreel Ufa Ton-Woche Nr. 439/1939 and in the Deulig Tonwoche Nr. 370/1939 after Hitler personally approved it. The footage also appeared in Hippler's antisemitic propaganda film Der ewige Jude (1940). Newsreels typically played down the exclusionary aspect of the people's community; January 1939 was the first time that Nazi policies towards the Jews were directly connected to the party leader on newsreels. Historian Richard J. Evans writes that the threat "could not have been more public".

At the time of the speech, Jews and non-Jews inside and outside of Germany were paying close attention to Hitler's statements because of Kristallnacht and the possibility of war. In the following days, the speech attracted significant commentary in Germany. The diarists Luise Solmitz, whose husband was Jewish, and Victor Klemperer, who was himself Jewish, mentioned the speech in their diaries but paid little attention to Hitler's threat.

Outside of Germany, coverage of the speech focused on the geopolitical implications, while the threat to Jews went unremarked. Some foreign commentators interpreted the speech as expressing a desire for peace if legitimate German demands were satisfied. The New York Yiddish newspaper Forverts printed a headline referencing Hitler's threat against the Jews, but the article below it only discussed the threat of war and Hitler's alliances with Italy and Japan. The Warsaw Yiddish newspaper Haynt discussed the speech in several issues beginning on 31 January, but did not emphasize the prophecy. On 31 January, it printed the main points of the speech without mentioning the prophecy; in an analysis of the speech published the next day, Moshe Yustman discussed appeasement and other foreign policy issues.
