= Norman H. Baynes =

British historian

Baynes in 1932.

Norman Hepburn Baynes FBA (29 May 1877 – 12 February 1961) was a 20th-century British historian of the Byzantine Empire.

== Early life ==
He was the son of Alfred Henry Baynes of the Baptist Missionary Society and his wife Emma Katherine Bigwood. He was educated at Eastbourne College, and New College, Oxford, where he took a second in literae humaniores in 1900 and won the Lothian Essay Prize in 1901.

== Career ==
Baynes was Professor of Byzantine History at University College London (UCL) from 1931 until 1942. He was given the title of Emeritus Professor in 1943 and Doctor of Literature honoris causa in 1951. His work included two fully annotated volumes of Hitler's pre-war speeches.

== Death and after ==
In his will, Baynes made a bequest to UCL which established 'The Norman Hepburn Baynes Prize' in 1961. The biennial prize is awarded in respect of "an essay on some aspect of history, including art, religion and thought of the Mediterranean lands within the period from 400BC to 1453AD".

== Selected published works ==
- Israel amongst the Nations (1927)
- Intellectual liberty and totalitarian claim. The Romanes lecture for 1942 (Oxford: Clarendon Press, 1942)
- The Speeches of Adolf Hitler, 1922-1939. Ed. Norman H. Baynes, 2 vols. (Oxford, 1942)
- Byzantium: An Introduction to East Roman Civilization. Ed. Norman H. Baynes and H. St. L. B. Moss. (Oxford: Clarendon, 1948; Oxford Paperbacks, 1961). A collection of signed articles by authorities; good bibliography.
- Constantine the Great and the Christian Church. Norman H Baynes. (1972) Second Edition, Raleigh Lecture, with a preface by Henry Chadwick. ISBN 0-19-725672-4
