= May Crisis =

Brief diplomatic crisis in 1938

The May Crisis was a brief episode of international tension in 1938 caused by reports of German troop movements against Czechoslovakia that appeared to signal the imminent outbreak of war in Europe. Although the state of high anxiety soon subsided when no actual military concentrations were detected, the consequences of the crisis were far-reaching.

== War scare ==
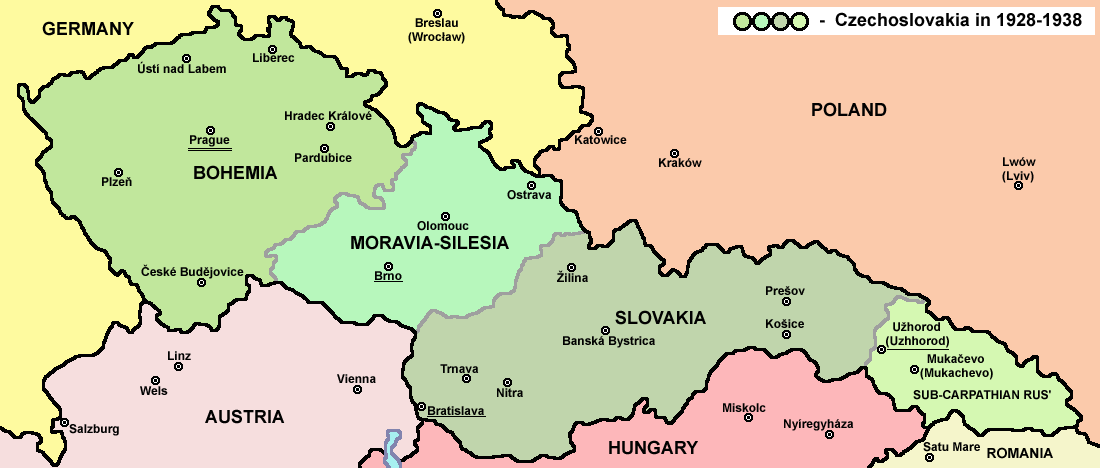
Czechoslovakia, 1918–1938 (In March 1938, Austria was annexed by Germany.)

With international tension already high in Central Europe after the German annexation of Austria in March 1938 and the continued unrest in the German-speaking border regions of Czechoslovakia, the Sudetenland, reports of substantial military concentrations in areas close to Czechoslovakia on 19 May 1938 gave rise to fears of an imminent German attack. In response to the reports, originating mainly from Czechoslovak intelligence sources, Czechoslovakia mobilised a number of military reservists on 20 May and strengthened its border defences. Alarmed by the developing situation, the governments of France (Czechoslovakia's main ally) and Britain warned Germany that they would come to Czechoslovakia's aid in the event of an attack. The German government denied that potentially-aggressive troop movements had taken place, and in the absence of any real evidence of military activity, the atmosphere of acute crisis had passed by 23 May.

== Aftermath ==
The appearance of decisive French and British diplomatic action in Berlin ran contrary to their general policy of appeasement towards Germany but ultimately served only to reinforce that policy. In the wake of the crisis, France and particularly Britain, fearful of war with Germany, intensified their pressure on the Czechoslovak authorities for concessions to the Sudeten German Party (SdP), which, under instructions from Nazi Germany, promoted unrest in the Sudetenland.

In Germany, being perceived to have backed down in response to Czechoslovak defensive measures and French and British diplomacy served only to reinforce hostility towards Czechoslovakia. Within a matter of days, the German leader, Adolf Hitler, revised the directive for Case Green, the plan to invade Czechoslovakia. The new directive, issued on 30 May 1938, was due to be carried out before the start of October 1938 and stated, "It is my unalterable decision to smash Czechoslovakia by military action in the near future".

The May Crisis was a short-lived but significant episode in 1938. Although no evidence has emerged of any aggressive German military preparations then being made, the outcome of the crisis was a significant step on the road to the Munich Agreement and the destruction of Czechoslovakia. The identity of the source of the misleading information concerning German troop concentrations that was supplied to the Czechoslovak intelligence service and the precise motivation behind it both remain uncertain.

Hitler referred to the May Crisis in his 30 January 1939 Reichstag speech by stating that he had committed to a military invasion if Czechoslovakia did not surrender the Sudetenland by 2 October. Referencing "a serious blow to the prestige of the Reich" and an "intolerable provocation", Hitler claimed that the Sudetenland had been secured by German determination and willingness to resort to force, rather than diplomacy.
