= The Holocaust in the Lublin District =

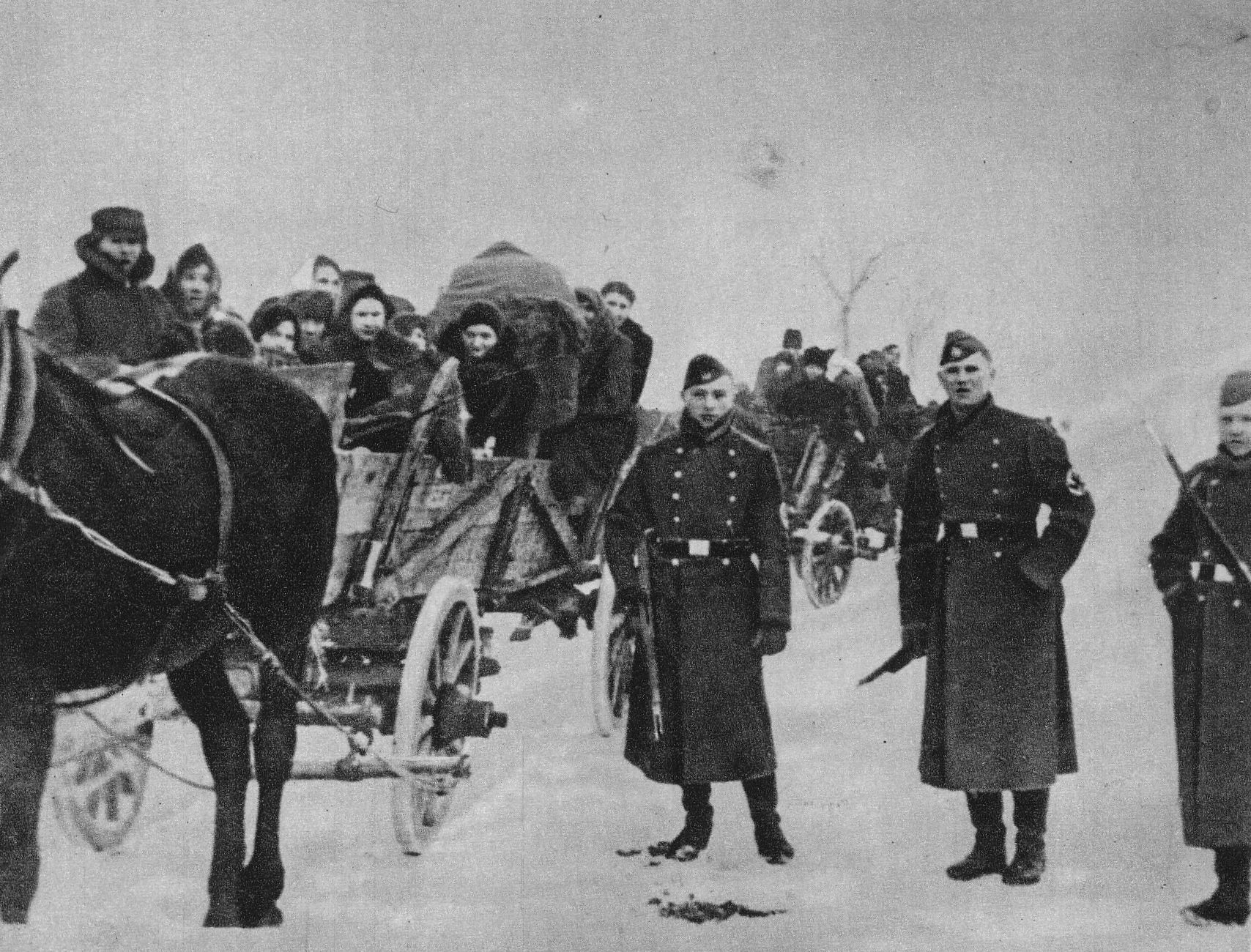
Local Jews during deportation to Belzec extermination camp

During the Holocaust, 99% of the Jews from Lublin District in the General Governorate of German-occupied Poland were murdered, along with thousands of Jews who had been deported to Lublin from elsewhere. There were three extermination camps in Lublin District, Sobibor, Belzec, and Majdanek.

== Ghettoization ==
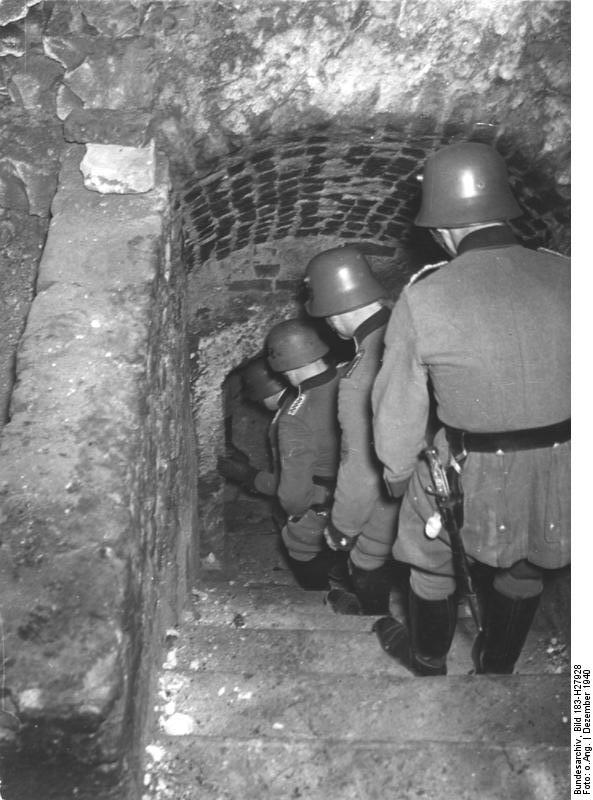
The German Order Police "Orpo" descending to the cellars on a "Jew-hunt" in Lublin, December 1940

The ghettoization of the Jews for the purpose of persecution, terror, and exploitation in the Nazi German controlled towns began immediately after the invasion of Poland, and the abandonment of the reservation idea did not influence the overall policy. The deportations of Jews into sealed urban ghettos continued uninterrupted pending further arrangements. The number of major urban ghettos established in the General-Government in 1939–40 including those of Kraków and Warsaw, reached one hundred before the end of the year. In the Lublin area, the situation initially differed. Instead of their urban concentration, some 10,000 Polish Jews had been expelled from Lublin in early March 1940 to the rural towns where ghettos were not set up, based solely on Globočnik's opposition to the Jewish people living near his staff headquarters. The remaining 40,000 Jews of Lublin were forced into the Lublin Ghetto in May 1940.

The official ghetto was established in Lublin on 24 March 1941. The expelled Jews were returned there. This measure was driven by the need for the new proper housing for the arriving German military, which was preparing for Operation Barbarossa. In the Lublin district, another ghetto was established in Piaski. In October and December 1941, the local administration and the Sicherheitspolizei headquarters issued decrees about the instant death penalty for the Jews caught leaving the Jewish district. Any Christian Pole harbouring Jews on the Aryan side of the city was to be executed along with his family. The ghetto inmates were terrorized by the Waffen-SS battalion of Oskar Dirlewanger, engaging in extortion, murder and rape (Rassenschande) to such an extent that they had to be moved elsewhere, yet again.

== Operation Reinhard ==
On 15 August 1940, after the Fall of France, Nazi leaders focused on developing a "territorial solution of the Jewish question" in French Madagascar. However, this plan was never implemented as it proved to be infeasible. During the Wannsee Conference in January 1942, the heads of the Nazi regime discussed the implementation of the Final Solution (Endlösung) and resolved the "Jewish question" by extermination rather than deportation. Of the Nazi extermination camps, Belzec, Majdanek, and Sobibor were all set up in the Lublin district.

The Belzec extermination camp was established in November 1941 near the forced labour camp by Odilo Globočnik under direct order of Heinrich Himmler. It was constructed as part of Aktion Reinhardt, the plan to murder all the Jews within the Generalgouvernment.

Globočnik was given the unconditional backing of Himmler. But his hard-line enforcement of Nazi racial ideology brought him into conflict with Hans Frank. Globočnik continued to control the Lublin district until Aktion Reinhardt finished in late 1943. Approximately two million Jews died in Belzec, Maidanek and Sobibor (including Treblinka) in the course of the "Aktion".

== End ==
After 1942, only a few tens of thousands of Jews were left, working mostly in forced-labor camps. During Operation Harvest Festival (3–4 November 1943) most of these Jews were killed. After the operation only ten labor camps remained, with around 10,000 Jews.
