= UFA Wochenschau =

West German newsreel (1956–1977)

UFA Wochenschau was a West-German Newsreel of UFA Films, existing August 1956 to June 1977.

In 1952, the Federal Government's Press and Information Office took over the newsreel founded by the American occupation administration and produced "Welt im Bild" until 1956. Between 1956 and 1968 it was called "Ufa-Wochenschau". From 1968 to 1977 it continued under the title "Ufa-Dabei". The 1970s effectively spelled the end for the majority of German movie newsreel productions. Television, which was present in almost all West German households and now also had a second program (ZDF) and its own news program, had become the dominant information medium. Cinema owners increasingly stopped using newsreels, which increasingly became a loss-making business. The federal government also withdrew from subsidizing newsreels.

The majority of the production of “Deutsche Wochenschau GmbH” was federally owned. This circumstance repeatedly sparked discussions and even led to Bundestag debates. The opposition (SPD) feared that the federal government would exert too much influence on the media and that this would result in one-sided reporting.
