= Hitler's Stalingrad speech =

1942 speech by Adolf Hitler

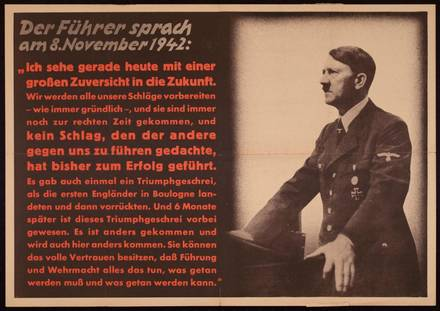
Quote from the speech reprinted in Parole der Woche, 25 November

Hitler's Stalingrad speech was an address made by Nazi leader Adolf Hitler to senior members of the Nazi Party on 8 November 1942. The speech took place at the Löwenbräukeller in Stiglmaierplatz in Munich during the height of the Battle of Stalingrad.

== Media references ==
The speech is portrayed in the film Stalingrad, where a group of embattled Wehrmacht soldiers listen to the speech from their entrenched positions within the city of Stalingrad. The speech is also featured in an episode of the 1988 miniseries War and Remembrance, when Hitler was addressing party faithful. An excerpt can also be heard on the 9th episode of the documentary series The World at War.
