= Die Brennessel =

Weekly satirical Nazi magazine (1931–1938)

- May 1938 cover alluding to the Great Purge by Stalin
- Editor: Wilhelm Weiss
- Categories: Satirical magazine
- Frequency: Weekly
- Publisher: Franz Eher Nachfolger
- First issue: January 1931
- Final issue: 1938
- Country: Germany
- Based in: Munich
- Language: German

Die Brennessel (German: The Stinging Nettle) was a weekly satirical magazine which was published in Munich, Germany, between 1931 and 1938. It was one of the publications which were established to gain popularity among Germans in favor of the Nazi Party. The magazine employed humor as a tool for Nazi propaganda.

== History and profile ==
Die Brennessel was first published in January 1931. The start of the magazine was announced in the official magazine of the Nazi Party, Illustrierter Beobachter, stating "We set our new weekly journal Die Brennessel against this poison of Jewish incitement and of making things contemptuous. It will be an excellent propaganda weapon for our supporters." The publisher of Die Brennessel was the Munich-based Franz Eher Nachfolger, which was affiliated with the Nazi Party. The company published many propaganda brochures, books and periodicals of the party before the start of the magazine. More importantly, it was the publisher of Adolf Hitler's book Mein Kampf. Max Amann was the director of the company.

Die Brennessel was modeled on Simplicissimus. The magazine had a high-quality layout and addressed not only Nazi Party members, but also those who were critics of the Weimar Republic. Its editor was Wilhelm Weiss.

In 1932 Die Brennessel managed to sell 40,000 copies weekly, making it the best-selling satirical magazine in the country. Later the magazine enjoyed much higher circulation levels, selling 80,000 copies. From 1933, when the Nazis won the elections, the satirical content of Die Brennessel became much more aggressive, particularly against the Jews. This approach was soon adopted by other satirical magazines such as Simplicissimus and Kladderadatsch. Die Brennessel began losing its readers and fame in 1936, and folded in 1938 due to low circulation levels of around 5,000 copies. One of the reasons for its failure was its inability to provide Germans with something entertaining.
