= Propaganda in the United Kingdom =

Propaganda in the United Kingdom can refer to:

- British propaganda during World War I
- British propaganda during World War II
  - Nazi propaganda and the United Kingdom
