= Greater German People's Community =

Historical political party in the Weimar Republic

Greater German People’s Community Großdeutsche Volksgemeinschaft
- Leader: Alfred Rosenberg; Julius Streicher
- Founded: 1 January 1924; 102 years ago
- Dissolved: 12 March 1925; 101 years ago
- Merged into: Nazi Party (NSDAP)
- Newspaper: Großdeutsche Zeitung. Editor-in-chief: Paul Tafel [ de ]
- Ideology: Nazism
- Political position: Far-right
- Colours: Brown

The Greater German People’s Community (German: Großdeutsche Volksgemeinschaft, GVG) was one of the two main front organizations established after the National Socialist German Workers' Party (Nazi Party) was banned by the government of the Weimar Republic in the wake of the failed Beer Hall Putsch of November 1923.

== History ==
The GVG was founded on 1 January 1924 by Alfred Rosenberg, the editor-in-chief of the Volkische Beobachter, on the instructions of Adolf Hitler who was incarcerated in Landsberg prison at the time. Shortly before his arrest on 11 November 1923, Hitler had charged Rosenberg with leadership of the movement.

Headquartered in Munich, the GVG was largely limited to Bavaria, the birthplace of National Socialism, and had no substantial presence outside that State. The GVG became a haven for Nazi Party members from that area. Prominent members included Max Amann, Phillip Bouhler, Hermann Esser, Franz Xaver Schwarz and Julius Streicher.

Rosenberg, one of the least charismatic of the Nazi leaders and lacking in leadership qualities, was soon pushed aside by Streicher, a far more ruthless and abrasive personality, who was elected Chairman of the GVG on 9 July 1924 with Esser, also a coarse, bullying sort, as his Deputy Chairman.

The GVG found itself vying for leadership of the Nazi movement with the other much larger successor organization, the National Socialist Freedom Movement (German: Nationalsozialistische Freiheitsbewegung, NSFB). This group consisted of an alliance between Nazi Party members from northern Germany and the German Völkisch Freedom Party. The leaders of this group were Erich Ludendorff, Albrecht von Graefe and Gregor Strasser. The NSFB supported participation in the electoral system. The GVG, by contrast, still clung to a revolutionary and anti-parliamentary orientation that eschewed participation in electoral politics. Consequently it won no seats in the two Reichstag elections of May and December 1924.

Neither group accepted the legitimacy of the other and both claimed the support of Hitler. This rivalry threatened a split in the National Socialist movement. Hitler, not wanting to jeopardize his chances for parole, announced his “withdrawal” from political leadership on 7 July 1924 and refused to publicly endorse either organization. This only resulted in increased confusion, disharmony and squabbling between the putative successor groups.

Shortly before Hitler’s release and indicating his change in strategy the GVG took part in the Munich local election on 7 December 1924. Max Amann, Ulrich Graf and one further member were elected as members of the Munich City Council.

Hitler was released from prison on 20 December 1924 and soon re-established the NSDAP, reclaiming its leadership on 27 February 1925 in a speech at the Bürgerbräukeller in Munich. Streicher and Esser were both in attendance and pledged their loyalty. The GVG subsequently formally disbanded on 12 March and its members rejoined the Nazi Party almost without exception.

== External websites ==
Grossdeutsche Volksgemeinschaft in the Bavarian Historical Dictionary
