= Vivian Stranders =

British military officer and Nazi spy (1881–1959)

- Stranders in 1926
- Born: 1881
- Died: 1959 (aged 77–78)
- Allegiance: Nazi Germany; United Kingdom

Vivian Stranders (1881–1959) was a British-born Royal Air Force officer, German spy, and Nazi propagandist. In his younger years, Stranders worked as a clerk, schoolmaster, and commission agent. He joined the part-time Territorial Force Royal Engineers in 1911 and rose to the rank of lieutenant. Stranders transferred to the Royal Field Artillery upon the outbreak of the First World War and served on the Western Front. He joined the Royal Flying Corps in 1917 as an equipment officer and, following the creation of the Royal Air Force, became a staff officer specialising in intelligence. After the war he served in Germany as a translator for commissions supervising the terms of disarmament and reparations.

Demobilised in 1921, Stranders remained in Germany and established an import business. By 1926, he had begun working for the German intelligence services, gathering information on French aviation matters. He was detected by the British Secret Intelligence Service and marked for arrest but was picked up by the French police first. Stranders was sentenced to two years' imprisonment for industrial espionage. After his release, he emigrated to Germany, joining the Nazi Party in 1932 and taking German citizenship in 1933. He lectured on English at universities and received a doctorate. During the Second World War, Stranders became a Schutzstaffel officer specialising in propaganda and working with British prisoners of war. He was nominally head of the British Free Corps, a small and unsuccessful collaborationist military unit. After the war, Stranders was arrested but escaped prosecution for treason and lived out the rest of his life in Germany.

== Early life ==
Stranders was born in 1881; his father was a composer and a professor at the Guildhall School of Music. He attended King Edward's School, Birmingham, a public school, before taking a degree in classical philology at University College London. Stranders went to Germany in 1903 to work as a German language teacher and study for a master of arts degree. He returned to London in 1904 and found work as a clerk. Stranders became a schoolmaster at Maidenhead, Berkshire, before working as a commission agent. He married Patricia O'Connell at Glasgow in June 1910.

== Military service ==
In British uniform

Stranders joined the part-time, volunteer military Territorial Force. He was appointed a supernumerary second lieutenant in the Works Companies of the Kent Fortress Royal Engineers on 7 May 1911. He ceased to be supernumerary on 22 September 1911, being taken onto the unit's establishment strength. Stranders was promoted to the rank of lieutenant on 15 August 1913.

After the outbreak of the First World War in 1914 Stranders was serving with the 10th Fortress Company of the Royal Engineers. He transferred to the Territorial Force's 1st (City of London) Brigade of the Royal Field Artillery as a second lieutenant on 8 August 1914. In July 1915 he was appointed to the brigade's ammunition column and served in that role on the Western Front until 1916. Stranders transferred to the Territorial Force Reserve on 2 July 1916, by which time he held the temporary rank of lieutenant.

Stranders joined the Royal Flying Corps on 8 February 1917, being appointed an equipment officer 3rd class. He was appointed to the more senior position of equipment officer 2nd class on 1 July 1917 and granted temporary rank as lieutenant in that role. Stranders was transferred to the Royal Air Force (RAF) when that force was established in April 1918. In July he was appointed a staff officer 3rd class and granted the temporary rank of captain while holding that appointment and was posted to a number of RAF stations in Britain. During his career with the flying services he became a specialist in intelligence.

After relinquishing his staff role on 8 September 1919 Stranders became a flying officer (equivalent to lieutenant), the RAF having adopted its own unique rank structure since his appointment. From September 1919 Stranders served in Germany with the Allied Aeronautical Commission of Control (under the Military Inter-Allied Commission of Control) and the Reparation Commission, mainly in Hamburg and Kiel. He provided his services as a translator and also helped to observe German compliance with disarmament agreements, including the transfer of Zeppelin aircraft to the Allies. On 25 August 1920 he was promoted in his Territorial Force role to lieutenant of artillery, with precedence from 1 July 1917. Stranders relinquished his territorial force commission on 30 September 1921 when the force became the Territorial Army. Stranders left Germany on 21 January 1921 when he was demobilised from the RAF, being transferred to the unemployed list; he received permission to use the rank of captain in retirement.

== Espionage case ==
After demobilisation Stranders became a businessman. He established an import company in Düsseldorf, which specialised in English-made motorcycles. Because of restrictions imposed by the Allies on German military manufacturing these types of imports provided the majority of engines for German-made aircraft of the period. Stranders' business also imported bicycles and motor cars. His business later moved to Cologne and Berlin and he had operations in Paris. In 1925 Stranders married a German woman in London. By 1926 he was the official representative of a French aircraft manufacturer in Germany.

By 1926 Stranders had been recruited by the German intelligence services. He was active in London, Paris and Brussels gathering intelligence mainly on French aviation matters. He was detected by the Secret Intelligence Service (SIS) while trying to secure British and French military information from a Belgian person. On 31 July 1926 the head of the Security Service, Sir Vernon Kell, passed papers to the Metropolitan Police that alleged Stranders was a bigamist. The Director of Public Prosecutions, Archibald Bodkin, declined to prosecute the case for lack of evidence but during their enquiries the police discovered a letter in the possession of a witness that linked Stranders with espionage activity.

Stranders was in Paris at the time of the British investigation and was suspected of meeting a German contact there. The Security Service made a request for Special Branch to arrest him on his arrival in Britain. Before he could return Stranders was, on 21 December 1926, arrested by French police, who had detected a leak of military aviation intelligence. In connection with the case British Special Branch officers raided a property in Brixton, London, in early January 1927 and spoke with an Englishman and an Austrian man. The case attracted significant press coverage and public attention. On 11 February the Member of Parliament for Shrewsbury, Viscount Sandon asked the Under-Secretary of State for Air, Sir Philip Sassoon, if Stranders still held a position in the RAF Reserve and received the reply that he did not, despite contrary press reports.

Stranders during his trial

Stranders' trial began on 24 February 1927; it was held in camera. The trial was attended by Stranders' ex-wife and their two children. Stranders was alleged to have provided information to Germany on French aviation and on a new model of French tank. His defence argued that the information that Stranders gathered was just that which could be obtained from open sources, such as a manufacturer's catalogue. He was, however, convicted of industrial espionage on 9 March and sentenced to two years' imprisonment and a fine of 1,000 francs (around £8 at that time).

== In Germany ==
Stranders was released from prison after 18 months and returned to Berlin where he worked as a journalist, writing to oppose the restrictions imposed on Germany by the Treaty of Versailles. By 1931 he was in Weimar and was in contact with the Nazi Party. He joined the party in 1932 and later claimed that his membership card was signed by party leader Adolf Hitler. In April 1933 Stranders became a German citizen, following this he was, on 12 August, deprived of the right to use either his British substantive rank of lieutenant or honorary rank of captain.

Stranders studied philosophy at the University of Bonn and lectured there on English; he was awarded a doctorate in March 1936. At the outbreak of the Second World War in 1939 he sought a high-level Nazi Party appointment in Berlin but instead was employed as an English-speaking propaganda broadcaster, under the name "Mediator". In 1943 Stranders was appointed a professor at Martin Luther University Halle-Wittenberg. That summer he was appointed to the Nazi Schutzstaffel (SS) headquarters as an expert on the United Kingdom with the rank of SS-Sturmbannführer (equivalent to major). Stranders was Jewish and some of his SS colleagues suspected him of being a British spy. He worked on schemes relating to British prisoners of war, including the collaborationist unit of the British Free Corps of which he was nominal head from late 1944 until the end of the war. The unit is considered a failure and never amounted to more than a few dozen members, who were arrested by US forces in 1945.

In February 1945 Stranders was working on Operation Königgrätz, a propaganda campaign aimed at British prisoners of war. Soviet advances forced him to flee first to Bremen and, in April 1945, to St. Johann in Tirol, Austria. He attempted to disappear in the chaos as the war ended but was sought by British intelligence. He was arrested by US troops at Garmisch-Partenkirchen in Bavaria in November 1945. British prosecutors could not charge him with treason as he held German citizenship at the time of his propaganda work and he was released. Stranders lived the rest of his life in North Rhine-Westphalia and died there after a long illness in 1959, aged 78.

== See also ==
- Nazi propaganda and the United Kingdom
