= Max Amann =

German Nazi official & publisher (1891–1957)

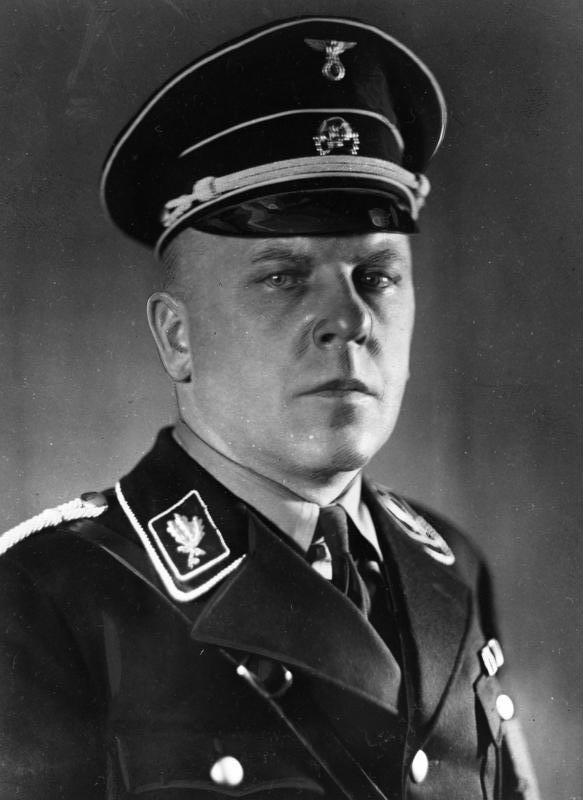
- Amann as an SS-Gruppenführer

Reich Press Chamber President
- In office 15 November 1933 – 8 May 1945
- Deputy: Otto Dietrich

Reichsleiter for the Press
- In office 2 June 1933 – 8 May 1945

Personal details
- Born: 24 November 1891 Munich, German Empire
- Died: 30 March 1957 (aged 65) Munich, West Germany
- Party: Nazi Party
- Other political affiliations: Greater German People's Community
- Occupation: Business manager Publisher

Military service
- Allegiance: German Empire
- Branch/service: Imperial German Army
- Years of service: 1912–1919
- Rank: Feldwebel
- Unit: 1st Royal Bavarian Infantry Regiment; 16th Royal Bavarian Infantry Regiment
- Battles/wars: World War I
- Awards: Iron Cross 2nd Class

Max Amann (24 November 1891 – 30 March 1957) was a high-ranking member of the Nazi Party, a German politician, businessman and art collector, including of looted art. He was the first business manager of the Nazi Party and later became the head of Eher Verlag ('Eher Publishing'), the official Nazi Party publishing house. He was also the Reichsleiter for the press. After the war ended, Amann was arrested by U.S. military occupation authorities. A denazification court deemed him a Hauptschuldiger ('Major Offender'). Amann was sentenced to ten years in a labour camp and stripped of his property, pension rights, and virtually all of his fortune.

Amann was released from custody in 1953, and died in poverty in Munich four years later.

== Early life ==
Amann was born in Munich on 24 November 1891. After attending Volksschule and a business school, he worked for a few years as a commercial office apprentice and a salesman. He then enlisted in the 1st Royal Bavarian Infantry Regiment in October 1912. When the First World War broke out he was transferred to the 16th Royal Bavarian Infantry Regiment and obtained the rank of Feldwebel (equivalent to the US Army staff sergeant). Amann was Adolf Hitler's company sergeant, and was thus an early acquaintance of Hitler long before his rise to prominence in German politics. He was awarded the Iron Cross second class during the war. He was discharged in December 1919.

== Nazi career ==
Amann joined the Nazi Party (NSDAP) in October 1921, as the Party's first business manager, and held NSDAP membership number 3. After 1922, he also led the Nazis' sole publishing house, Eher Verlag. Eher Verlag published, among other imprints, the antisemitic satirical magazine Die Brennessel and the Schutzstaffel (SS) magazine Das Schwarze Korps ("The Black Corps"). Amann took part in the November 1923 Beer Hall Putsch and in April 1924 was sentenced to four-and-a-half months in Landsberg Prison. During the period when the Nazi Party was banned, Amann was a leading member of the Greater German People's Community, a Nazi front organization headquartered in Munich. In November 1924 he was elected as a NSDAP candidate to the Munich city council, serving until 1933. When the Nazi Party was reestablished on 27 February 1925, Amann immediately rejoined it.

Amann's most notable contribution was persuading Hitler to retitle his first book from Viereinhalb Jahre (des Kampfes) gegen Lüge, Dummheit und Feigheit, (transl. Four and a Half Years (of Struggle) Against Lies, Stupidity and Cowardice) to Mein Kampf ('My Struggle') which he also published. The book became a major source of Eher-Verlag's income and Amann oversaw the book through many editions. He helped Hitler become a wealthy man. Amann also enriched himself through many Nazi publications. Amann published the daily Volkischer Beobachter, the weekly Illustrierter Beobachter and the Nationalsozialistische Monatshefte.

On 5 March 1933 at the first parliamentary election after the Nazi seizure of power, Amann was elected to the Reichstag from electoral constituency 24, Upper Bavaria–Swabia. He retained this seat until the fall of the Nazi regime in May 1945. On 2 June 1933, Hitler appointed him a Reichsleiter, the second highest political rank in the Nazi Party. On 15 November 1933, Hitler named Amann the president of the Reich Press Chamber (Reichspressekammer) and Reich Press Leader. Amann joined the SS on 15 March 1932 with the rank of SS-Gruppenführer, was promoted to SS-Obergruppenführer on 30 January 1936 and was assigned to the staff of the Reichsführer-SS.

Amann pursued a dual-pronged strategy to establish Nazi control over the press industry. In his official role as president of the Press Chamber, Amann had the power to seize or close down any newspapers that either ran counter to the Nazis' wishes or did not fully support the Nazi regime. Then, as head of the Eher-Verlag, he bought them at a substantial discount–often at "auctions" at which the Eher-Verlag was the sole bidder. By 1942, Amann controlled 80% of all German newspapers through his publishing empire. Combined with the proceeds from Mein Kampf, this made the Eher-Verlag the largest newspaper and publishing company in Germany, and one of the largest in the world. His income increased from 108,000 ℛ︁ℳ︁ in 1934, equivalent to €511,000 in 2021, to 3.8 million ℛ︁ℳ︁ in 1944, equivalent to €15.3 million in 2021.

As a party official Amann lacked talent, being a poor speaker and debater. In addition, his handwriting was illegible, thus his chief of staff and deputy, Rolf Rienhardt, performed these duties for him. Poor handwriting can be attributed in part to the loss of his left arm in an accident with a firearm while hunting with Franz Ritter von Epp on 4 September 1931.

Arrested by American troops after the war ended, Amann was deemed a Hauptschuldiger ('Major Offender') and sentenced to ten years in a labour camp on 8 September 1948. He was released in 1953, but was stripped of his property, pension rights and practically all of his fortune. Amann died on 30 March 1957, in Munich.

== Nazi-looted art ==
In 2014, the Bavarian State Painting Collections discovered in the Pinakothek der Moderne's collection 14 art works that they suspected had belonged to Amann. The Pinakothek received the artworks in 1945 and could not detail their provenance enough to say whether they were looted or not. The German Lost Art Foundation listed the 10 paintings and 4 sculptures, which included works by Gabriel Mäleßkircher, Franz von Stuck, Friedrich Kaulbach, and others.

== See also ==
- Ullstein Verlag
- List of Nazi Party leaders and officials
