= Hermann Esser =

Founding member of the Nazi Party (1900–1981)

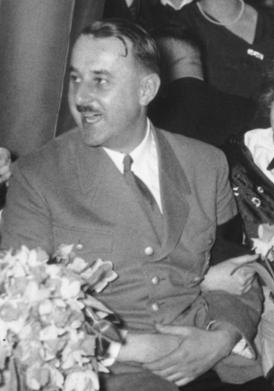

Second Vice President of the Reichstag, later Deputy to the Reichstag President
- In office 12 December 1933 – 8 May 1945
- Preceded by: Walther Graef
- Succeeded by: Position abolished

State Secretary for Tourism Reich Ministry of Public Enlightenment and Propaganda
- In office 4 March 1939 – 8 May 1945

Bavarian Minister of Economics
- In office 1 March 1934 – 21 March 1935
- Preceded by: Ludwig Siebert
- Succeeded by: Hans Dauser

Gauleiter Upper Bavaria-Swabia
- In office 16 September 1926 – May 1927
- Preceded by: Position established
- Succeeded by: Fritz Reinhardt

Reichspropagandaleiter
- In office 4 August 1925 – April 1926
- Preceded by: Otto May
- Succeeded by: Gregor Strasser

Personal details
- Born: 29 July 1900 Röhrmoos, Kingdom of Bavaria, German Empire
- Died: 7 February 1981 (aged 80) Dietramszell, Bavaria, West Germany
- Party: Nazi Party

Military service
- Allegiance: German Empire
- Branch/service: Royal Bavarian Army
- Years of service: 1917–1918
- Unit: Royal Bavarian 19th Foot Artillery Regiment
- Battles/wars: World War I

Hermann Esser (29 July 1900 – 7 February 1981) was an early member of the Nazi Party (NSDAP). A journalist, Esser was the editor of the Nazi paper, Völkischer Beobachter, a propaganda leader, and a vice president of the Reichstag. In the early days of the party, he was a de facto deputy of Adolf Hitler. As one of Hitler's earliest followers and friends, he held influential positions in the party during the Weimar Republic, but increasingly lost influence during the Nazi era.

== Early life ==
Esser was born in Röhrmoos, Kingdom of Bavaria. The son of a civil servant, he was educated in the high school at Kempten. As a teenager, he volunteered for service in World War I and fought on the front lines in the Royal Bavarian 19th Foot Artillery Regiment. After demobilization, he joined the Swabian Freikorps, and in May 1919 took part in the suppression of the Munich Soviet Republic. Esser early on became a socialist, after he joined a left-wing provincial newspaper to train as a journalist. He had previously formed his own Social Democrat party, but as it was small and one of numerous post-Armistice parties in Germany and Austria, it quickly failed.

== Nazi career ==
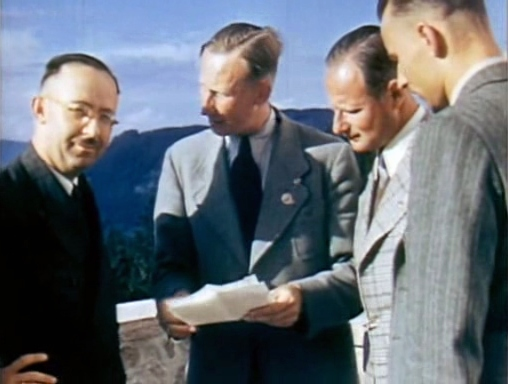
Hermann Esser (far right, back to camera) with Heinrich Himmler (left), Reinhard Heydrich (middle), Karl Wolff (2nd from right) at the Obersalzberg, May 1939

Having met Anton Drexler through his work, he met with the group of men that formed the German Workers' Party (DAP): Drexler, Gottfried Feder and Dietrich Eckart, joining their party in January 1920. In 1920 he met Hitler in the regional press office of the Reichswehr (Army of the Weimar Republic) and joined the renamed National Socialist German Workers' Party in March 1920. In the autumn of 1920, he began his public appearances in Passau. On 15 May 1921 he was made editor-in-chief of Völkischer Beobachter, the Party newspaper, turning out a series of posters and a book attacking the Jews.

Esser was able to use his abilities as a public speaker to rouse his audience, encouraging them to attack the political meetings of groups and parties that the NSDAP frowned upon. Esser's speeches were described by Louis Snyder as "crude, uncultured, of low moral character", featuring the kernel of future Nazi policies: extreme nationalism and anti-Semitism. On 12 August 1921 he left as editor of the Party newspaper and became the first head of propaganda (Propagandaleiter, NSDAP), serving until the party was outlawed in November 1923.

At the time of the Beer Hall Putsch on 8–9 November 1923, Esser gave a speech and drafted the Party's "proclamation to the German people", but told Hitler that he was ill and did not participate in the actual march. After the failure of the putsch, he fled to Austria. Along with Julius Streicher, he later returned to Bavaria in January 1924 and was sentenced to three months in prison.

Esser was released from prison in April 1924 and later visited Hitler in Landsberg Prison. On 9 July 1924 he was elected the Deputy Chairman of the Nazi front organization, the Greater German People's Community based in Bavaria under Streicher. He immediately made enemies with Gregor Strasser who was a leader of a rival organization in northern and western Germany which threatened to split the party in two. It was only in December 1924, after Hitler's release from prison, that the split was avoided.

When the party was re-established on 27 February 1925, Esser immediately rejoined and was given membership number 2. On 4 August 1925, Esser resumed his position as Propaganda Leader (Reichspropagandaleiter) and continued in this role until April 1926. After Esser fell out with Streicher, and Hitler sided with his opponent, Esser threatened to go to the media with the NSDAP's secrets. He was bought off by being made editor of Illustrierter Beobachter from 1926 until 1932 in which he engaged the public through gossip and scandal. On 16 September 1926 he was made Gauleiter of Upper Bavaria and Swabia, serving until May 1927.

From December 1929 to April 1933, Esser was the Party's floor leader in Munich's Stadtrat (City Council). From 1929 to 1932, he also was a member of the Upper Bavarian Kreistag (District Assembly). In April 1932 he was elected to the Bavarian Landtag and became its president in April 1933, serving until it was dissolved on 14 October 1933. On 10 March 1933, when the Nazis seized control of the Bavarian state government, he was appointed one of the state's representatives to the Reichsrat until its abolition on 14 February 1934. Also in March 1933, he was elected to the Reichstag from the Nazi Party electoral list. At the November 1933 election, he was returned as a deputy for electoral constituency 24, Upper Bavaria–Swabia, a seat he would retain for the duration of the Nazi regime. In December 1933 he was made 2nd Vice President of the chamber under Hermann Göring, and some time later was styled Deputy to the Reichstag President, the only person to hold this title. In May 1933, Esser returned to Passau to address a rally celebrating the dedication of the Ostmarkmuseum. He first wrote and published his book Die jüdische Weltpest (The Jewish World Plague) in 1933. After the pogroms of the Kristallnacht of 9 November 1938, he republished it in early 1939, again under the NSDAP press.

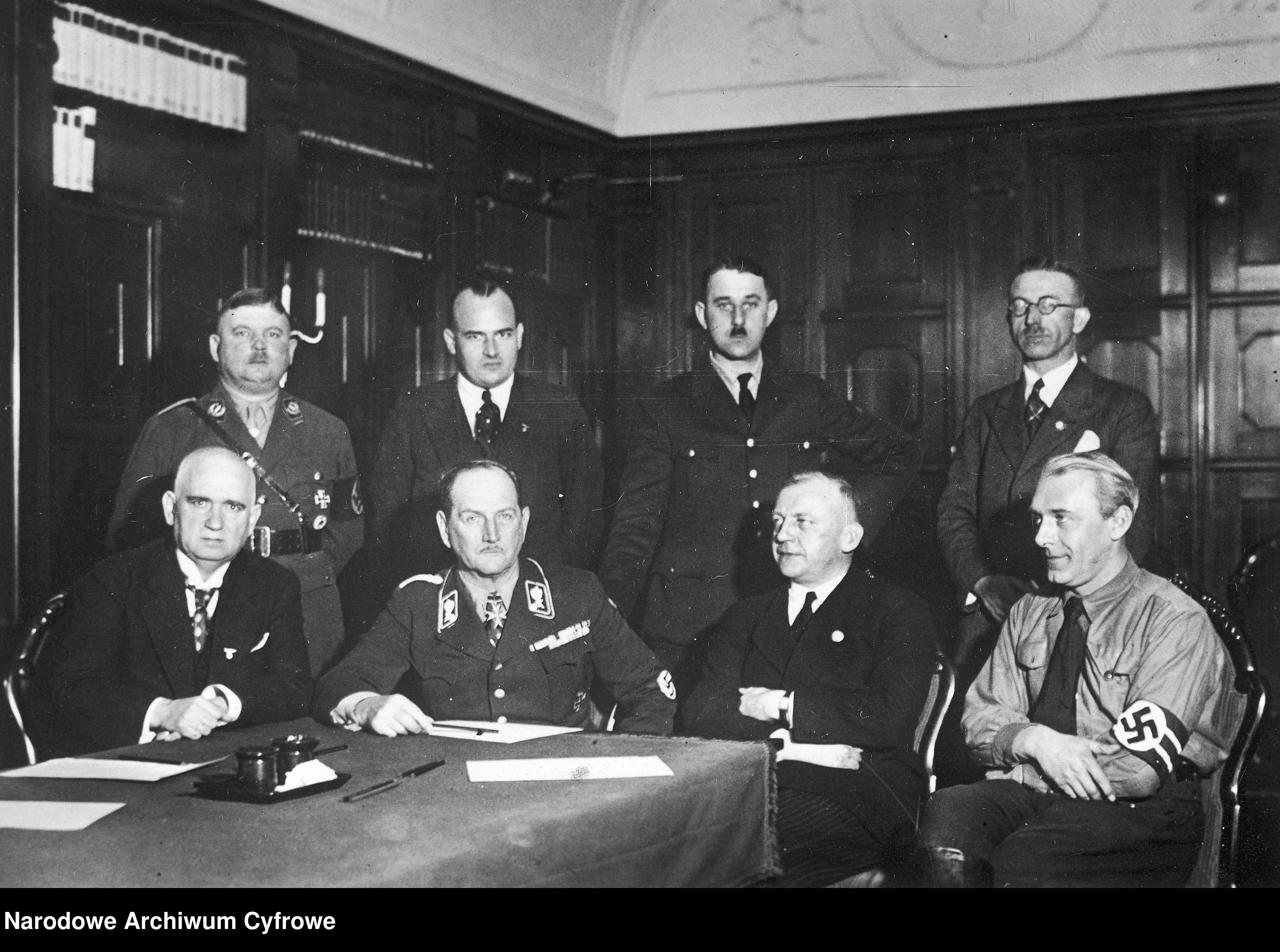
The Nazi controlled Bavarian Commissarial Government of March 1933 (German: Bayerische Kommission, Reichskommissariat für Bayern, Kabinett von Epp). Seated from left Minister of Finance Ludwig Siebert, Prime Minister/Reich Governor of Bavaria Franz von Epp, Minister of the Interior Adolf Wagner, and Minister of Culture Hans Schemm. Standing from left State Commissioner Ernst Röhm, Minister of Justice Hans Frank, Minister of State Hermann Esser, and Minister of Agriculture Georg Luber. Press Photo: National Digital Archives of Poland

On 12 April 1933, he was appointed a Minister without Portfolio in the Bavarian government. He was also named head of the Bavarian Press Office and Chief of the Bavarian State Chancellery. This was followed on 1 March 1934 by his appointment as Bavaria's Minister of Economics by Bavarian Reichsstatthalter (Reich Governor) Franz Ritter von Epp. Esser intrigued against the powerful Gauleiter of Gau Munich-Upper Bavaria Adolf Wagner and, as a result, was forced out of his ministerial posts on 14 March 1935. After his exclusion from politics in Bavaria, Esser did not wield any significant political power. In April 1936, he was appointed Chairman of the Reich Committee for Foreign Tourism, and on 27 January 1939 State Secretary for Tourism in the Reich Propaganda Ministry under Joseph Goebbels. On 4 March 1939, he was promoted to Gruppenführer of the National Socialist Flyers Corps (NSFK). His last official duty was on 24 February 1945 in Munich, delivering a speech on behalf of Hitler at the 25th anniversary of the adoption of the Nazi Party program.

== Scandals ==
Esser enjoyed life and the power that his media and political power gave him with women. His dalliances led to his being marginalized. After he impregnated a young woman and refused to marry her, she appealed directly to Hitler, who told Esser that he must do the right thing. Upon the birth of the child, Hitler became its godfather.

Esser later sexually assaulted the underage daughter of a businessman. The combined disgust of Strasser, Streicher and Joseph Goebbels led to his suspension from the NSDAP in March 1935. Hitler had previously said of him, "I know Esser is a scoundrel, but I shall hold on to him as long as he can be of use to me!"

== Post-war ==
Arrested by the Americans after the end of the war in Europe, he was released in May 1948 after being considered an unimportant Nazi official. Esser then went into hiding only to be re-arrested in 1949 by the West German Police. Charged under the new West Germany anti-Nazification laws, he was found guilty of being a "major offender" and sentenced to five years hard labour with a loss of civil rights for life. He was released from custody in 1952.

In 1980, Bavaria's Minister President Franz Josef Strauß congratulated Esser on his 80th birthday.

Esser died in Dietramszell, Bavaria aged 80 on 7 February 1981.
