= Mazal Holocaust Collection =

Holocaust archive in Boulder, Colorado, US

The Mazal Holocaust Collection is a Holocaust-related archive at the University of Colorado Boulder in Boulder, Colorado, U.S.

== Content ==
The Mazal Holocaust Collection is the largest privately owned Holocaust-related archive in the world. It comprises 500,000 items, including 20,000 books. Some of its items include aerial photographs of the Auschwitz concentration camp and transcripts of the Nuremberg Trials. Additionally, it includes old copies of Der Stürmer, books of Holocaust denial, and material published by the American Nazi Party in the 1930s. As of March 2015, the full extent of the collection was unknown.

== History ==
The collection was established by Harry W. Mazal, a businessman of Turkish-Jewish descent who was born in Mexico City, Mexico, and subsequently lived in San Antonio, Texas. Mazal only found out he was Jewish as a teenager, and he began collecting documents related to the Holocaust then. His primary aim was to counter the discourse of Holocaust deniers. In 2011, Mazal discovered one of his employees was stealing and selling some of his collection; the thief was sentenced to eight years in prison in 2014.

With the help of Professor David Shneer, it has been based at the University of Colorado Boulder since January 2014. Students act as volunteers to categorize and digitalize the collection.
