= Das Reich (newspaper) =

Nazi newspaper

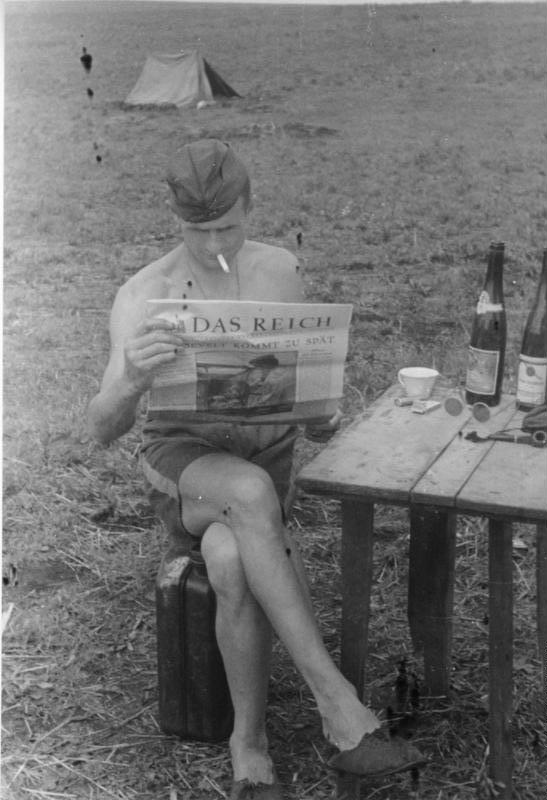
German soldier reading Das Reich on the Eastern Front, 1941

Das Reich (German: The Reich) was a weekly newspaper published in Nazi Germany from May 1940 until 1945. Founded by Joseph Goebbels, the Reich Minister of Public Enlightenment and Propaganda, and published by Deutscher Verlag, it was intended to appeal to educated readers while serving as a vehicle for Nazi propaganda.

Das Reich combined news reports, political commentary, essays, book reviews and Goebbels's weekly editorial in a comparatively restrained style. Its circulation grew from around 500,000 copies in 1940 to more than 1.4 million by 1944, making it one of Nazi Germany's most widely read weekly publications.

== History ==
Das Reich was mainly the creation of Rudolf Sparing, Rolf Rienhardt and Max Amann.

Its circulation grew from around 500,000 copies in October 1940 to over 1.4 million by 1944.

Aside from writing a weekly editorial, Goebbels was not involved in the newspaper's day-to-day production. Most, though not all, of his articles after 1940 appeared in Das Reich. During the 1930s, his articles had primarily appeared in Der Völkische Beobachter, but with Das Reich he sought to reach a more educated and intellectually engaged readership. Between May 1940 and 1945 he wrote 218 editorials.

Following the Allied invasion of Italy and the subsequent overthrow of Benito Mussolini in 1943, Goebbels chose not to publish an editorial for that week's issue.

== Contents ==
The newspaper contained news reports, political commentary, essays on various subjects, book reviews and a weekly editorial written by Goebbels. Some material was written by foreign authors. With the exception of Goebbels's editorial, Das Reich generally adopted a more restrained and literary style than most other Nazi publications.

Its reporting addressed a wide range of wartime subjects, including the uncertain casualty figures following the Battle of Stalingrad, Allied military operations, the Allied bombing campaign, the V-1 flying bomb campaign, criticism of American culture and morale, and calls for continued resistance during the final stages of the war.

Goebbels's editorials promoted Nazi military victories, justified German war aims, attacked the Allied powers and the Soviet Union, encouraged total war, and urged Germans to ignore foreign broadcasts and remain committed to the war effort. As Germany's military position deteriorated, the editorials increasingly focused on Allied bombing, shortages on the home front, antisemitic conspiracy theories and calls for continued resistance.

His final editorial, published in April 1945, called for continued resistance despite the collapse of Nazi Germany.

== See also ==
- Other newspapers of Nazi Germany:
  - Der Angriff ("The Attack"), Josef Goebbels' Berlin-based newspaper
  - Berliner Arbeiterzeitung ("Berlin Workers Newspaper"), Gregor and Otto Strasser's newspaper, representing the Strasserite wing of the Nazi Party
  - Illustrierter Beobachter ("Illustrated Observer"), illustrated companion to the Völkischer Beobachter
  - Panzerbär ("The Panzer Bear"), a tabloid Nazi newspaper intended for the troops defending Berlin from the Red Army
  - Das Schwarze Korps ("The Black Corps"), the official newspaper of Heinrich Himmler's Schutzstaffel (SS)
  - Völkischer Beobachter, the official Nazi newspaper
  - Der Stürmer ("The Stormer"), Julius Streicher's Nuremberg-based virulently antisemitic newspaper
