= Das Schwarze Korps =

Official newspaper of the Schutzstaffel in Nazi Germany

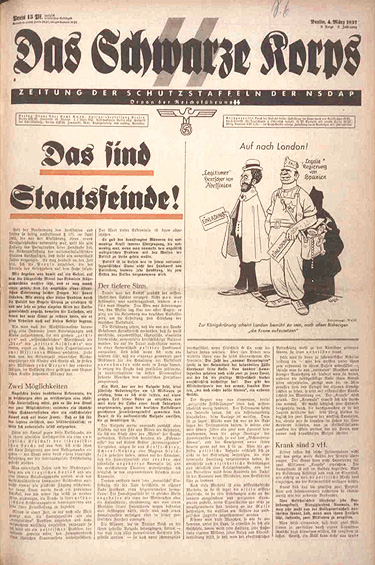
- 1937 edition
- Type: Weekly newspaper
- Founded: 6 March 1935
- Ceased publication: 1945
- Political alignment: Nazism
- Language: German
- Circulation: 750,000 (as of 1944)
- OCLC number: 10953830

Das Schwarze Korps ([das ˈʃʋaʁtsə koːɐ̯]; German for "The Black Corps") was the official newspaper of the Schutzstaffel (SS). This newspaper was published on Wednesdays and distributed free of charge. All SS members were encouraged to read it. The chief editor was SS leader Gunter d'Alquen; the publisher was Max Amann of the Franz-Eher-Verlag publishing company. The paper was hostile to many groups, with frequent articles condemning the Catholic Church, Jews, Communism, Freemasonry, and others.

The newspaper was published in close co-operation with the Sicherheitsdienst (SD; Security Service), which had substantial editorial control. The first edition appeared on 6 March 1935. In November of the same year, publication reached 200,000 and by 1944 had increased to 750,000. The newspaper saw some distribution outside Germany. (Note: During the 1930s, it was available in the United States in at least one bookshop associated with the German American Bund.)

== History and contents ==
Formed in 1935, Das Schwarze Korps was the official newspaper of the Schutzstaffel (SS). The newspaper was created to be a defender of Nazism, as well as to disseminate and promote the ideological messages of their organization and its leader, Reichsführer-SS Heinrich Himmler. The paper was used to reinforce Himmler's beliefs, to identify and attack elements within German society that he found unacceptable, to boost morale among members of the SS, to combat anything considered to be pernicious enemies within the Nazi state, and to encourage the racial doctrine that "pure-blooded Nordics must be bred"—which included promoting the idea that it was partially the responsibility of members of the "elite" SS corps to correspondingly produce "beautiful" illegitimate children. Illegitimate births aside, marriage was depicted as an obligation to the state, part of the mechanism to establish a racially productive community in which individual happiness was of no importance.

In its inaugural edition, Das Schwarze Korps authors reiterated the Nordicist opinion of German scholars like Hans Günther—an important figure in official Nazi Party racial doctrine—that the "cradle of the Nordic peoples" was found "near the North Pole." As the Olympic Games approached, the journal extolled sport as an expression of racial beauty, a means of strengthening the body, the mind, and physical contest as a form of preparation for war, echoing the doctrine of the SS itself. On other occasions the paper served to inform its readers on the pseudo-scientific research Himmler commissioned to support his beliefs in the mystical powers of the ancient Germanic predecessors. In one edition, Das Schwarze Korps reported on the archaeological whereabouts (previously unknown) of Henry I's remains, claiming that, "scientific evidence has established that the remains discovered during excavations in the crypt of Quedlinburg cathedral are in fact those of Henry I."

Besides the esoteric pursuits of Himmler, the newspaper strongly criticized party leaders whose worldview differed from SS doctrine. Carefully crafted articles gave SS men and the other readers an elitist image of the organization. This by means of information about the SS, its activities and successes, which were constantly scattered throughout the paper. In place of the traditional aristocracy that existed in Germany and Europe proper, the SS advocated a culture of performance and merit. This included the articulation of new standards; for example, concerning the traditional title of "von" among the Junkers, Das Schwarze Korps quipped:

The little word "von" no longer means to us the same thing it once did. We believe the nobility has the right to exist, not a nobility of class, not a nobility of birth or of property, but a nobility of achievement ... the best from all classes ... that is the nobility of the Third Reich.

Das Schwarze Korps routinely contained foreign news reports, analyses of threats, and theoretical essays on Nazi policies. Praise for motherly women and families was contrasted with the women's movement; Nazi doctrine characterized women participating in politics as being too manly and called them "Amazons" so as to discredit them. It had a strong pro-natalist slant, encouraging procreation or adoption. Anti-clerical articles appeared in the paper, many of which attacked senior members of the clergy, each article part of an effort to "demolish the moral authority of the Catholic Church." Christian concepts like original sin were described as "intolerable" ideas that were "incompatible" with Nordic man and the otherwise "heroic ideology" about Germanic blood. The journal also held both branches of Christianity—Protestant and Catholic alike—responsible for "denaturing the race" and claimed that intrinsic feelings connected to human nature were "holy and intangible" as opposed to sinful.

The paper also covered foreign press attacks with instructions on how to refute them. In accordance with doctrines of Blood and Soil, it spoke of the need to break up the aristocratic estates, although this was not implemented. Historian Amy Carney described Das Schwarze Korps as "a conduit through which the SS was able to reveal its ambitions to the German people." (Note: Two months after the paper started publication, head of the SS Main Office, SS-Gruppenführer August Heißmeyer, asserted, "in no other press product is the spirit of the SS presented in so clear a manner as in Das Schwarze Korps." From: SS-Zeitung Das schwarze Korps, 27 May 1935, BA NS31/354, 47.) Das Schwarze Korps provided members of the SS with articles reminding them of their need to "be mindful of their family's biological heritage when marrying" and for general readers, the paper demonstrated "how dedicated its men were to their Führer and to the Reich and what an example they were setting for the entire Volk by adhering to the principles of eugenics." Individual SS lives were given credence for their collective place in the framework of kith, kin, tribe, and the greater German Reich.

Prior to the passing of the 1935 Nuremberg Laws, the paper called for a law to ban Rassenschande or intercourse between Jews and Germans, as preferable to the extra-legal violence that the SA Stormtroopers indulged in against interracial couples; after that edition, articles on the "Jewish Question" did not increase in number, but did grow more harsh in tone. The periodical also contained remonstrances against homosexuals, who the authors characterized as degenerates that constituted a "scourge of racial annihilation." Judicial leniency for persons the Nazis deemed undesirable was either criticized or ridiculed and a 1937 issue explained the obligation of lawyers to protect the "national community."

In the late 1930s, the paper featured an article written by physicist and Nobel Prize winner Johannes Stark, who argued that the racial, physical triumph of the Aryan over 'the Jew' would only be a "partial victory" unless Jewish ideas and sentiments were not also fully destroyed. Stark added that, "we also have to eradicate the Jewish spirit, whose blood can flow just as undisturbed today as before if its carriers hold beautiful Aryan passes." In October 1938, an editorial argued that German Jews as "are also responsible for whatever world Jewry undertakes against Germany" and that they were also "liable for the damages which world Jewry inflicts and will inflict upon us."

A subsequent edition of Das Schwarze Korps communicated the harsh and foreboding message that if any single Jew harmed a German, they would all be held responsible, while another explicitly stated: "The day a murder weapon that is Jewish or bought by Jews rises against one of the leading men of Germany, there will be no more Jews in Germany!" Immediately in the wake of the carnage of Kristallnacht, Nazi threats became reality and the SS-sponsored paper promoted ideas that anti-Semitism had been prevalent in all racially healthy peoples for thousands of years, but the Nazis were the only ones willing to take practical actions; meanwhile the periodical claimed the international community was full of hypocrites who refused to offer the Jews "safe refuge." Additional propagandistic usage of the SS journal included the promotion of the cult of personality surrounding Adolf Hitler, as his portraits abounded within the text. A telling example of the adulation dedicated to the Nazi leader shows in the following extract from Das Schwarze Korps:

The Führer is the highest gift to the nation. He is the German fulfilment. An artist who wants to render the Führer must be more than an artist. The entire German people and German eternity will stand silently in front of this work, filled with emotions to gain strength from it today and for all time. Holy is the art and the call to serve the people. Only the best may dare to render the Führer.

Such deification of Hitler accompanied by anti-Semitic propaganda made the editorial staff of the SS newspaper a responsible entity in the institutional framework of the Holocaust. The newspaper itself is an indictment against the Nazi Party collectively since it revealed even before the war that the SS was prepared to take radical action against the Jews. Besides praising Hitler, the paper made specious claims against any perceived enemy; for example, Jews were portrayed as having an inclination towards Bolshevism (a widely known enemy of the Nazi state) in Das Schwarze Korps, indicated in the following excerpt from the 24 November 1938 edition:

Least of all we do not want to see hundreds of thousands of impoverished Jews as a breeding-ground for Bolshevism and a recruiting base for the political and sub-humanity that, as a result of the selection process, is disintegrating on the margins of our own nationhood...In the event of such a development, we would face the harsh necessity of wiping out the Jewish underworld just as we are used to wiping out criminals in our orderly state: with fire and sword. The result would be the actual and definitive end of Jewry in Germany, its total extermination. (Note: The particular Schwarze Korps article from which this statement is derived, was entitled "Jew, what now?")

Hate-speech from the editors of the SS newspaper portended the Jews' later fate. Despite the sweeping statements made in the official SS-journal, SD chief Reinhard Heydrich—among the leading perpetrators of the Holocaust—rarely appears within its pages, as he thought it was "ill-organized and poorly written." This did not stop Heydrich from using the paper to reinforce his message that any and all dissenters to the Anschluss with Austria were to be arrested, whether or not they wore a Nazi uniform.

Malleable to the political needs of the Nazi state, Das Schwarze Korps along with the Völkischer Beobachter were both used as propaganda mechanisms to promote the Molotov–Ribbentrop Pact between the Soviet Union and Germany in August 1939. Commenting accordingly, the SS-newspaper optimistically asserted that the former tsarist empire "had originally been a Germanic state" that saved Prussia twice in the past, and the two countries "had always flourished when they were friends." (Note: While the pact secretly identified spheres of interest between both powers—additionally confirmed by the supplementary protocol of the German–Soviet Frontier Treaty amended after the joint invasion of Poland—its real purpose was the prevention of a two-front war; the pact ended when Hitler launched Operation Barbarossa on 22 June 1941.)

During the war, whenever the Waffen-SS would join the army in maneuvers, particularly at Hitler's behest, the instances were proudly reported in Das Schwarze Korps. Deliberate propaganda efforts to bolster morale formed a notable portion of the content of the newspaper, especially in encouraging members of the SS and the public at large to remain prepared to report anyone who might oppose the war effort. For example, a 1943 article told the story of a soldier on leave from Stalingrad who overheard an old woman thought to be mentally impaired complaining about the war; the paper encouraged extreme action against people like this, calling them "cowardly traitors" and claiming in no uncertain terms that such persons deserve the same "harshness that we show toward the enemy, regardless of how stupid and innocuous we find them. This a war for our very survival. He who does not want our victory wants our defeat. He who wants our defeat wants our death."

Das Schwarze Korps was never officially dissolved and continued to publish until Germany's defeat in World War II, with its final edition published on March 29, 1945.

== See also ==
- Other newspapers of Nazi Germany:
  - Der Angriff ("The Attack"), Josef Goebbels' Berlin-based newspaper
  - Berliner Arbeiterzeitung ("Berlin Workers Newspaper"), Gregor and Otto Strasser's newspaper, representing the Strasserite wing of the Nazi Party
  - Illustrierter Beobachter ("Illustrated Observer"), illustrated companion to the Völkischer Beobachter
  - Panzerbär ("The Panzer Bear"), a tabloid Nazi newspaper intended for the troops defending Berlin from the Red Army
  - Das Reich, a weekly newspaper founded by Goebbels
  - Der Stürmer ("The Stormer"), Julius Streicher's Nuremberg-based virulently antisemitic and frequently semi-pornographic newspaper
  - Völkischer Beobachter ("People's Observer"), the official Nazi newspaper, published in Munich
