= Nazi propaganda and the United Kingdom =

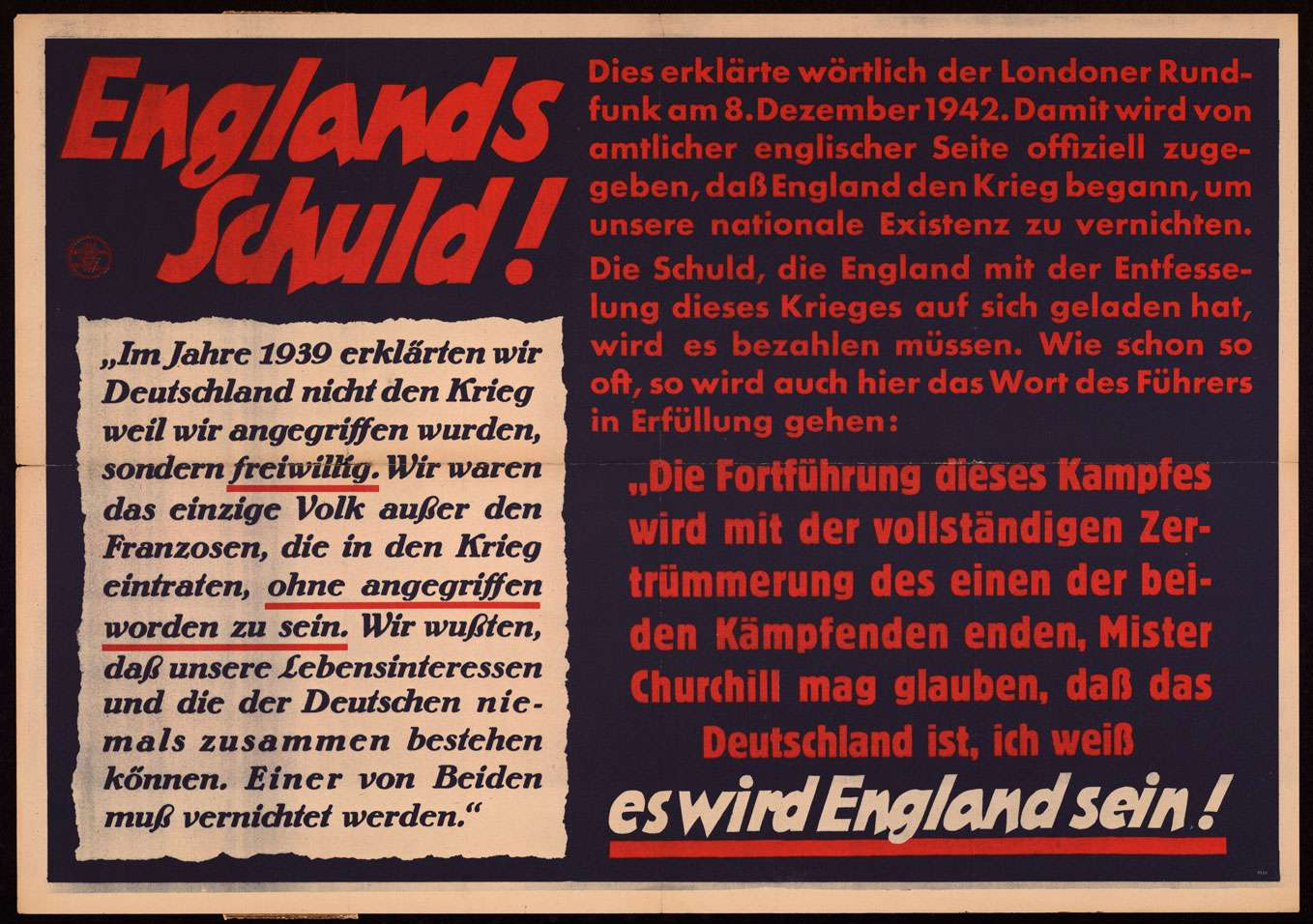
"England's guilt!" December 1942 edition of the wall newspaper Parole der Woche, blaming the United Kingdom for the war

Nazi propaganda towards the United Kingdom changed its position over time in keeping with Anglo-German relations. Prior to 1938, as the Nazi regime attempted to court the British into an alliance, Nazi propaganda praised the "Aryan" character of the British people and the British Empire. However, as Anglo-German relations deteriorated, and the Second World War broke out, Nazi propaganda vilified the British as oppressive German-hating plutocrats. During the war, it accused "perfidious Albion" of war crimes and sought to drive a wedge between Britain and France.

== History ==
=== Pre-war ===
Initially, the aim of Nazi foreign policy was to create an Anglo-German alliance and so before 1938, Nazi propaganda tended to glorify British institutions and above all the British Empire. Even though it regarded the British, along with France, as "decadent democracies", Joseph Goebbels set out to court them.

Typical of the Nazi admiration for the British Empire was a lengthy series of articles in various German newspapers throughout the mid-1930s praising various aspects of British imperial history, with the clear implication that there were positive parallels to be drawn between the building of the British Empire in the past and building the German Empire in the future. The esteem in which the British Empire was held can be gauged by the fact that the lavish adoration heaped upon it was not matched by similar coverage of other European empires, both past and present. An example of that sort of coverage was a long article in the Berliner Illustrierte Zeitung newspaper in 1936 that extolling the British for "brutally" resolving the Fashoda Incident of 1898 with France in their favour with no regard for diplomatic niceties. Another example of Nazi anglophilia included a series of widely promoted biographies and historical novels commemorating various prominent "Aryan" figures from British history such as Cromwell, Marlborough, Nelson, Rhodes, Wellington and Raleigh.

A particular theme of praise was offered for British “ruthlessness” and "lack of moral scruples" in building and defending their empire, which was held as a model for the Germans to follow. Hitler professed an admiration for the imperial might of the British Empire in Zweites Buch as proof of the racial superiority of the Aryan race, and British rule in India was held up as a model for how the Germans would rule Eastern Europe.

Perhaps, more importantly for gauging the Nazi regime's pro-British feelings in its early years, was the prominence given to Englandkunde (English studies) within German schools and the lavish praise offered to British youth organisations as a model within the Hitler Youth.

=== Change in attitude ===
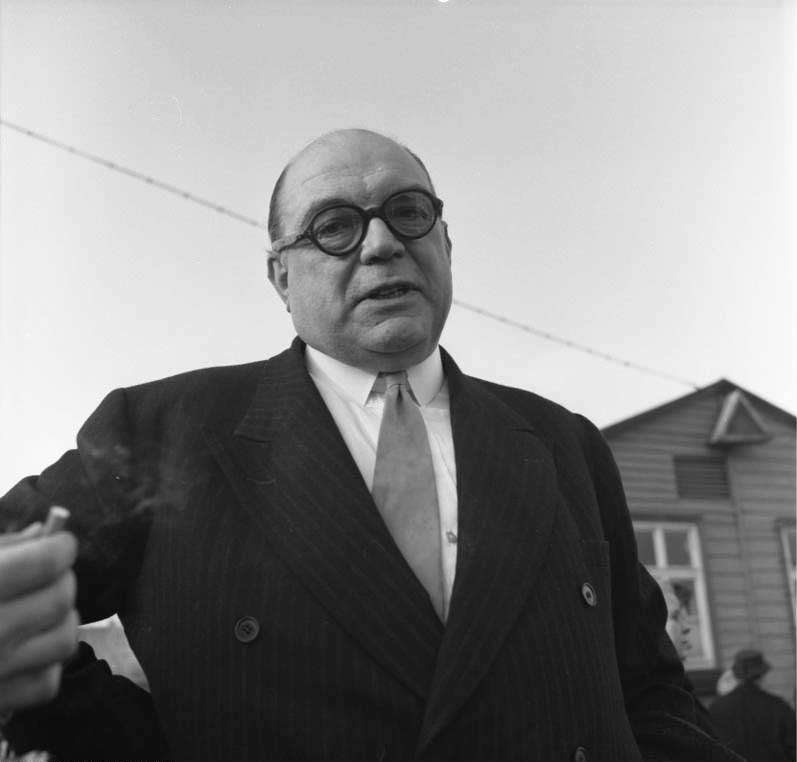
Sefton Delmer (1958)

Until November 1938, the British were depicted as an Aryan people, but they were afterward denounced as "the Jew among the Aryan peoples" and as plutocrats who were fighting for money. That was sometimes modified with the suggestion that it was the British ruling class alone that was the problem. Goebbels denounced Britain as having a few hundred families rule the world without any moral justification, a phrase that had been taken directly from the communist-supported French Popular Front despite Nazi opposition to communism.

The change of emphasis was caused by Hitler's changed view of Britain from a potential ally to an enemy that would have to be destroyed. The emphasis increased as British resistance continues. Such films as Der Fuchs von Glenarvon and My Life for Ireland did not show quite the crude anti-British stereotypes as later films such as Ohm Krüger and Carl Peters.

The instant and unauthorised rejection of the peace terms of Hitler's 19 July 1940 speech by Sefton Delmer on the BBC produced a great impact on Germany. Goebbels believed that had to show governmental inspiration, and the German press was instructed to attack the rejection.

== Major themes ==
=== British imperialism ===
One of the major themes of the anti-British propaganda campaign launched in late 1938 was alleged British human rights abuses in India and then in dealing with the Arab uprising in the Palestine Mandate. They were used to illustrate the "hypocrisy" of British criticism of Germany's treatment of its Jewish minority. A postcard dropped over Egypt showed a British soldier with Arabs dangling from his bayonet. The Parole der Woche's weekly wall newspaper jeered at Franklin D. Roosevelt's description of the British as defenders of freedom by showing the torture of Indians and describing other atrocities. A cigarette book titled Robber State England displayed instances such as the British executions of mutinous sepoys after the Indian Rebellion of 1857.

In such films as Der Fuchs von Glenarvon and My Life for Ireland, the British are depicted as brutal oppressors of the Irish. (My Life for Ireland, indeed, inspired fears among Germans of inciting Poles to rebellion.) The "Scottish transmitter" spread such propaganda to Scotland and Ireland about supposed English atrocities in those countries and the use of Scottish and Irish armies to fight English battles.

Ohm Krüger depicted the British as oppressing the Boers. The film depicted the British as seeking gold, which symbolised barrenness and evil, in contrast to the Boers, who raised crops and animals, which was reinforced by showing the British as prurient and having the hero's son be brought to obey Paul Kruger only after his wife has been raped. Whereas Queen Victoria is presented as a harridan addicted to whiskey, Kruger is presented as an inspiring leader.

=== British capitalism ===
Another major theme was the difference between British "plutocracy" and Nazi Germany. German newspapers and newsreels often pictured photos and footage of British unemployed and slums, together with unfavourable commentary about the differences in living standards of the working class of Nazi Germany and those of the working class living under British "plutocracy". Germany was represented as an ideal collectivist Volksgemeinschaft (people's community), which put the economic "common interest before the individual interest", which was contrasted with the supposedly-savage Manchestertum (Manchester capitalism) and individualist society of Britain in which it was alleged that the rich had it all while the poor were left to starve. So successful were the anticapitalist attacks on Britain that reports to the Social Democratic émigré Sopade from within Germany reported that the Nazis had made major gains with the German workers who had voted for the Social Democratic Party and the Communist Party during the Weimar Republic. German propaganda asserted that the Second World War had been started by Britain to prevent Germany's social revolution from inspiring its own people to discontent. The British declaration of war on Germany in 1939 was represented as an attempt to put an end to German Nazism, which maintained a generous modern welfare state that cared for the poorest Germans, because British workers living under Manchestertum had started to demand the same sort of welfare state for themselves.

After the British withdrew in 1941 after they had lost the Battle of Greece, the Parole der Woche's weekly wall newspaper showed a World War I British soldier stating that sandbags were not needed since they had the French soldiers. This time, the paper jeered that the plutocrats had to fight themselves and could not hire others to do so.

The Beveridge Report of 1943 was attacked as a fraud and worse than what the Germans had achieved even in the 19th century and would never be permitted in plutocratic England. The way the plan that was to be put off until war was derided, but Goebbels tried to suppress it because Nazi Germany was also deferring social reform until after the war. A Das Reich cartoon depicted the upper classes as being forced to it.

Simultaneously, propaganda presented the British as tools of the communists. A German parody stamp, of one depicting King George and Queen Elizabeth, replaced the queen with Stalin and added a hammer and sickle and stars of David. The Parole der Woche' weekly wall newspaper declared that America and Britain had agreed to let Stalin take Europe. Using propaganda to present the Jews as being behind both helped to juggle the issues of opposing "plutocracy" and communism at once.

=== Anti-German prejudice ===
A third major theme of anti-British propaganda was the "irrational" anti-German prejudices that were said to be held by the British establishment and the claim that Britain was an "old" declining country ruled over by a gerontocracy of extremely elderly men, who were full of envy and hatred of the dynamism of "young" rising countries like Germany. As part of the "young" nation message, major emphasis was given to the youth and the large families of the Nazi leaders, which was contrasted unfavourably with the age and the small families of the British leaders, with the not-so-subtle implication that Germans were much more sexually virile than the British.

=== Allegations of hypocrisy ===
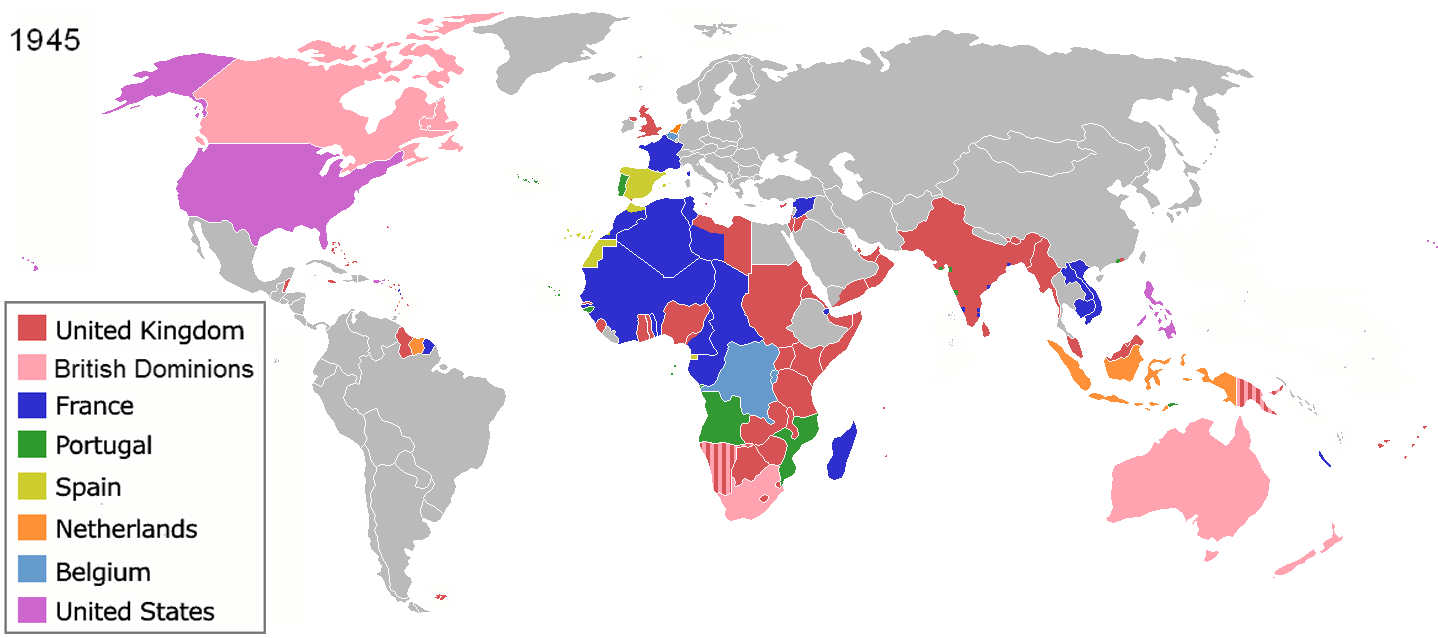
World map of European colonial empires at the end of the Second World War in 1945.

Attacks were made on Britain for the "hypocrisy" for maintaining worldwide empire but seeking to block the Germans from acquiring an empire of their own. The film Carl Peters, for instance, depicted the title character as being driven from German colonies by British administrators and the weak character of the (pre-Nazi) German government, which was unwilling to do what was needed to keep and hold an empire. In keeping with attacks on the British Empire, the Treaty of Versailles was depicted as a monstrously unjust peace treaty that was designed by the British to cripple Germany and to allow British hegemony in Europe. In keeping with that theme, German propaganda stressed that Britain had to maintain its hegemony over the centuries by manipulating the other European states into war, and Germany, the "guardian of Europe", was now standing up for all nations of Europe in putting an end to British "causing trouble on the continent".

Goebbels specifically attacked Britain for objecting to the takeover of Czechoslovakia.

=== Allegations of war crimes ===
Special editions of Illustrierter Beobachter denounced Britain and France for starting the war. Claims were made both that France and Britain had started the war, wanted to make a blockade rather than one that would actually hurt them, and also had actually invaded Belgium and the Netherlands and forced the Germans to forestall them. The discrepancy did not attract much attention. A cigarette book announced the Germans' determination to face down "the war England has forced upon us". The British intent was said to be preventing the social revolution in Germany from inspiring discontent with the plutocracy in Britain. As France was falling, Goebbels wrote in Das Reich of the "missed opportunities" that Britain and France had for peace.

Another common motif was to accuse Britain of attacking in a barbarous manner. Articles on British bombing raids accused it of targeting civilians. After the bombing raid on Cologne, a pamphlet claimed that in contrast, the Germans did not target civilians. Goebbels took advantage of a 1943 memorial service for the victims of bombing raids to proclaim Allied guilt and German innocence. Despite the encouragement that it might give to the enemy and not inspiring calm, propaganda shifted from playing down raids to playing them up, inspiring hatred of the enemy and sympathising with neutral countries.

Goebbels also warned the Germans that having lied about German atrocities in World War I, Britain would obviously lie again in this war. That theme was continually repeated in warnings against enemy propaganda.

== In France ==
France was a particular target for anti-British propaganda to divide both allies. During the war, German radio broadcasts questioned why the British had sent only a few thousand troops, and pamphlets depicted the British soldier as far behind the lines while the French soldier were fighting. Postcards and pamphlets claimed that British soldiers were enjoying the charms of the French soldiers' wives. That continued after the war, with cartoons, and many posters set out to remind the French of past relations with "perfidious Albion". The attack on Mers-el-Kébir was exploited to depict Frenchmen dying and Churchill as a killer. A widely used propaganda poster urged the "abandoned populations" to have confidence in the German soldier.

That was also used inside Germany. Das Reich depicted Britain as seeking to claim French colonies and observed that it was blockading its former ally.

== See also ==
- Nazism in the United States

== Bibliography ==
- Strobl, Gerwin (2000). The Germanic Isle. Cambridge, United Kingdom: Cambridge University Press.
- Rhodes, Anthony (1976). Propaganda: The art of persuasion: World War II. New York: Chelsea House Publishers.
- Hertzstein, Robert Edwin (1978). The War That Hitler Won. New York: G. P. Putnam's Sons. ISBN 0-399-11845-4.
- Balfour, Michael (1979). Propaganda in War 1939-1945: Organisation, Policies and Publics in Britain and Germany. London: Routledge and Kegan Paul. ISBN 0-7100-0193-2.
- Leiser, Erwin (1974) [1968]. Nazi Cinema. Translated by Mander, Gertrud; Wilson, David. Hamburg [New York]: Rowohlt Taschenbuch Verlag [Macmillan]. ISBN 0-02-570230-0.
- Grunberger, Richard (1971). The 12-Year Reich: A Social History of Nazi Germany, 1933–1945. New York: Holt, Rinehart and Winston. ISBN 0-03-076435-1.
