= Rudolf Sparing =

German journalist

Rudolf Sparing (1904–1955) was a German journalist and editor. He joined the Nazi Party (National Socialist German Workers’ Party) in 1937. He was a co-founder of the weekly newspaper Das Reich and served as head of its editorial staff from February 1943 until April 1945.

== History ==
Rudolf Sparing worked with Carl Anders and Rolf Rienhardt on the development of the editorial programme for the newspaper Das Reich. The first issue was published on 26 May 1940. Described as a co-founder, Sparing took over leadership of the editorial staff with the issue dated 14 February 1943 and retained this role until April 1945. After the war, Sparing was taken away by Soviet forces. News of his death came from a Soviet camp in May 1955.
