= Der Stürmer =

German antisemitic tabloid newspaper

- A special issue of Der Stürmer from 1934. The image depicts Jews extracting blood from Christian children for use in religious rituals and sacrifices, which is an example of the blood libel against Jews.
- Type: Weekly newspaper
- Format: Tabloid
- Publisher: Julius Streicher (Publisher) Karl Leopold von Möller (Timișoara Publishing)
- Founded: 20 April 1923
- Ceased publication: 1 February 1945
- Political alignment: Nazism
- Language: German
- Headquarters: Nuremberg, Nazi Germany
- Circulation: 480,000 (1938)

Der Stürmer (pronounced [deːɐ̯ ˈʃtʏʁmɐ]; lit. 'The Stormer' or 'Stormtrooper' or 'Attacker') was a weekly German tabloid newspaper published from 1923 to the end of World War II by Julius Streicher, the Gauleiter of Franconia, with brief suspensions in publication due to legal difficulties. It was a significant part of Nazi propaganda, and was virulently antisemitic. The paper was not an official publication of the Nazi Party, but was published privately by Streicher. For this reason, the paper did not display the Nazi Party swastika in its logo.

The paper was a very lucrative business for Streicher, and made him a multi-millionaire. The newspaper originated at Nuremberg during Adolf Hitler's attempt to establish power and control. The first copy of Der Stürmer was published on 20 April 1923. Der Stürmer's circulation grew over time, eventually distributing to a large percentage of the German population, as well as Argentina, Brazil, Canada, and the United States. The newspaper reached a peak circulation of 486,000 in 1937.

Unlike the Völkischer Beobachter (The Völkisch Observer), the official Nazi Party paper, which gave itself an outwardly serious appearance, Der Stürmer often ran obscene material such as the blood libel and graphic caricatures of Jews, as well as sexually explicit, anti-communist, and anti-monarchist propaganda. As early as 1933, Streicher was calling for the extermination of the Jews in Der Stürmer. During the war, Streicher regularly authorized articles demanding the annihilation and extermination of the "Jewish race". After the war, Streicher was convicted of being an accessory for crimes against humanity, and was executed by hanging.

== Circulation ==
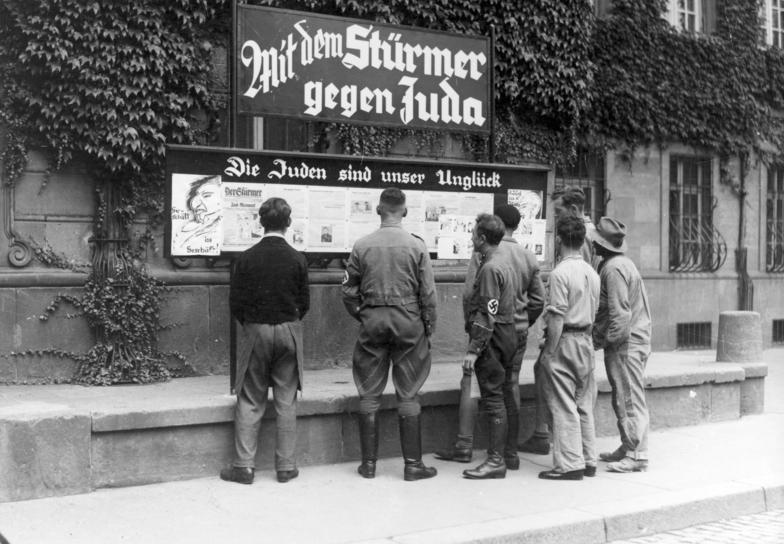
German citizens publicly reading pages of Der Stürmer in Worms, 1935. The billboard heading reads: "With the Stürmer against Judah". The subheading reads: "The Jews are our misfortune".

Most of the paper's readers were young people, and people from the lowest strata of German society. Copies of Der Stürmer were displayed as a wall newspaper in prominent red Stürmerkästen ("Stürmer boxes") throughout the Reich. As well as advertising the publication, the cases also allowed its articles to reach those readers who either did not have time to buy and read a newspaper in depth, or could not afford the expense. In 1927, Der Stürmer sold about 27,000 copies every week. By 1935, its circulation had increased to around 480,000.

== Nazi attitudes towards the paper ==
From the late 1920s, Julius Streicher's vulgar style of propagandism increasingly became a cause of embarrassment for the Nazi Party. In 1936, the sale of Der Stürmer was restricted in Berlin during the Summer Olympics, in an attempt to preserve the Nazi regime's international reputation and prestige. Propaganda Minister Joseph Goebbels tried to completely ban the newspaper in 1938, Reichsmarschall Hermann Göring forbade Der Stürmer in all of his departments, and Baldur von Schirach prohibited Hitler Youth members from reading it in Hitler Youth-sponsored hostels and other education facilities run by a "Reichsbefehl" ("Reich command"). Göring harboured a particularly intense hatred of the paper, especially after it published a libelous article alleging that his daughter Edda had been conceived through artificial insemination. It was only through Hitler's intervention that Streicher was spared from severe punishment.

However, other senior Nazi officials, including Reichsführer-SS Heinrich Himmler, chairman of the German Labour Front Robert Ley, and proprietor of the Zentral Verlag (Central Press) Max Amann, whose organization comprised 80% of the German press, endorsed the publication, and their statements were often published in the paper. Albert Forster, the Gauleiter of Danzig (now Gdańsk), wrote in 1937:

With pleasure, I say that the Stürmer, more than any other daily or weekly newspaper, has made clear to the people in simple ways the danger of Jewry. Without Julius Streicher and his Stürmer, the importance of a solution to the Jewish question would not be seen to be as critical as it actually is by many citizens. It is therefore to be hoped that those who want to learn the unvarnished truth about the Jewish question will read the Stürmer.

Hitler considered Streicher's primitive methods to be effective in influencing "the man in the street". Although Streicher and his paper were increasingly isolated in the Nazi party, Hitler continued to support Streicher, and was an avid reader of Der Stürmer. In December 1941, he stated: "Streicher is reproached for his Stürmer. The truth is the opposite of what people say: He idealized the Jew. The Jew is baser, fiercer, more diabolical than Streicher depicted him." In February 1942, he praised the newspaper, by stating: "One must never forget the services rendered by the Stürmer. Now that the Jews are known for what they are, nobody any longer thinks that Streicher libeled them."

Hermann Rauschning, who claimed to be Hitler's "confidant", said in the mid-1930s:

Antisemitism was beyond question the most important weapon in Hitler's propagandist arsenal, and almost everywhere, it was of deadly efficiency. That was why he had allowed Streicher, for example, a free hand. The man's stuff, too, was amusing, and very cleverly done. Wherever, he wondered, did Streicher get his constant supply of new material? He, Hitler, was simply on thorns to see each new issue of the Stürmer. It was the one periodical that he always read with pleasure, from the first page to the last.

During World War II, the paper's circulation suffered because of paper shortages, as well as Streicher's exile from Nuremberg for corruption. More ominously, because of the Holocaust, the people it targeted had begun to disappear from everyday life, which diminished the paper's relevance. Hitler, however, insisted that Streicher receive sufficient support to continue publishing Der Stürmer. The final edition of the newspaper was published in February 1945. Julius Streicher was tried at Nuremberg after the end of the war, and after being found guilty of being an accessory to crimes against humanity, he was hanged in 1946.

== Antisemitic content ==
1934 Stürmer issue: "Storm above Judah" – attacking institutional churches as "Judaized" organizations. Jesus Christ is seen looking at modern clergy. Caption: Two thousand years ago I called the Jews a cursed people, but you have made out of them the Elect Nation.

According to the American writer Dennis Showalter, "a major challenge of political antisemitism involves overcoming the images of the 'Jew next door' – the living, breathing acquaintance or associate whose simple existence appears to deny the validity of that negative stereotype". The newspaper's lurid content appealed to a large spectrum of readers who were lower class and less sophisticated. Der Stürmer was known for its use of simple themes that required little thought. The newspaper often gave descriptions of how to identify Jewish people, and included racist political cartoons and antisemitic caricatures. Besides the graphic depictions, articles often focused on imaginary fears, exaggerations, and perceived behavioral differences between Jews and other German citizens.

After the war, Streicher was tried at the Nuremberg trials. His publishing and speaking activities were a major part of the evidence presented against him. In essence, the prosecutors took the line that Streicher's role in inciting Germans to murder Jews made him an accessory to murder, and thus as culpable as those who actually carried out the killing. Prosecutors also introduced decisive and irrefutable evidence that Streicher continued his incendiary articles and speeches when he was well aware that Jews were being killed. Streicher was found guilty of being an accessory for crimes against humanity, and was executed by hanging shortly afterwards.

=== Antisemitic caricatures ===
Der Stürmer was known for its virulently antisemitic caricatures, which depicted Jews as ugly characters with exaggerated facial features and misshapen bodies. In his propaganda work, Streicher furthered medieval stereotypes accusing Jews of killing children, sacrificing their bodies, and drinking their blood. The large majority of these drawings were the work of Philipp Rupprecht, known as Fips, who was one of the best-known antisemitic cartoonists of Nazi Germany. Through the adaptation and amalgamation of almost every existing antisemitic stereotype, myth, and tradition, Rupprecht's virulent attacks aimed predominantly at the dehumanization and demonization of Jews. At the bottom of the title page, there was always the motto "Die Juden sind unser Unglück!" ("The Jews are our misfortune!"), coined by Heinrich von Treitschke in the 1880s. In the nameplate was the motto "Deutsches Wochenblatt zum Kampfe um die Wahrheit" ("German Weekly Newspaper in the Fight for Truth").

=== Alleged sexual crimes ===
Stories of Rassenschande, which denoted alleged scandals of Jewish men and German women having sex, were staples of Der Stürmer. Streicher described Jews as sex offenders who were "violators of the innocent, perpetrators of bizarre sex crimes, and ritual murderers", who allegedly performed in religious ceremonies using blood of other humans, usually Christians. Streicher also frequently reported attempts of child molestation by Jews. Der Stürmer never lacked details about sexual intercourse, names, and crimes to keep readers aroused and entertained. These accusations, articles, and crimes printed in Der Stürmer were often inaccurate, and rarely investigated by staff members. In the newspaper's opinion, if a German girl became pregnant by a Jew, the Jew would deny paternity, offer to pay for an abortion, fail to pay child support, or leave for the United States. Within Der Stürmer, it was not uncommon to read reports of German women aborting their children because they did not want to bring a "Jewish bastard into the world".

Streicher believed in the antisemitic telegony hypotheses of Artur Dinter.

=== Accusations of financial crimes ===
Showalter said: "For Julius Streicher, the Jews' hatred for Christianity was concealed only for one reason: Business." Jewish businessmen were often portrayed as doing almost anything to obtain financial wealth, which included, in his words, "become a usurper, a traitor, a murderer". In the summer of 1931, Streicher focused much of the paper's attention on a Jewish-owned butchery. As an example, when a philanthropic merchant started operating a soup kitchen, Der Stürmer ran articles accusing the business of poisoning the food being served. Der Stürmer criticized and cherrypicked every single price increase and decrease in Jewish shops, as well as their charitable donations, denouncing it as a further form of financial greed. This attack on Jewish benevolence, generosity, and philanthropism received the most public criticism out of all of Der Stürmer's antisemitic propaganda. Its "Letter Box" encouraged the reporting of Jewish illegal acts, while its unofficial style helped prevent suspicion of propaganda, and lent it an air of "authenticity".

== See also ==
- Other newspapers of Nazi Germany:
  - Der Angriff ("The Attack"), Joseph Goebbels' Berlin-based newspaper
  - Berliner Arbeiterzeitung ("Berlin Workers Newspaper"), Gregor and Otto Strasser's newspaper, representing the Strasserite wing of the Nazi Party
  - Illustrierter Beobachter ("Illustrated Observer"), illustrated companion to the Völkischer Beobachter
  - Panzerbär ("The Panzer Bear"), a tabloid Nazi newspaper intended for the troops defending Berlin from the Red Army
  - Das Reich, a weekly newspaper founded by Goebbels
  - Das Schwarze Korps ("The Black Corps"), the official newspaper of Heinrich Himmler's Schutzstaffel (SS)
  - Völkischer Beobachter ("People's Observer"), official Nazi newspaper published in Munich
  - Westdeutscher Beobachter [de] ("West German observer"), official Nazi newspaper published in Cologne
- Arijský boj ("The Aryan Struggle", 1940–1945), a Czech fascist newspaper inspired by Der Stürmer
- The Daily Stormer, an American white supremacist and neo-Nazi website named and modeled after Der Stürmer
