= Wilhelm Weiss =

German journalist and Nazi propagandist (1892–1950)

- Weiss c. 1938

Editor-in-Chief Völkischer Beobachter
- In office 1938 – 8 May 1945
- Preceded by: Alfred Rosenberg
- Succeeded by: Position abolished

Chairman Reich Association of the German Press
- In office 1934 – 8 May 1945
- Preceded by: Otto Dietrich
- Succeeded by: Position abolished

Personal details
- Born: Wilhelm Weiß; March 31, 1892 Stadtsteinach, Kingdom of Bavaria, German Empire
- Died: February 24, 1950 (aged 57) Wasserburg am Inn, West Germany

Military service
- Allegiance: German Empire; Weimar Republic
- Branch/service: Bavarian Army; Luftstreitkräfte
- Years of service: 1911–1920
- Rank: Hauptmann
- Unit: 2nd Bavarian Foot Artillery Regiment; Field Aviation Detachment 71
- Battles/wars: World War I
- Awards: Iron Cross, 1st and 2nd class Bavarian Military Merit Order, 4th class

Wilhelm Weiss (German Wilhelm Weiß) (31 March 1892 – 24 February 1950) was a German journalist who, in Nazi Germany, was an SA-Obergruppenführer as well as the editor-in-chief of the Nazi Party's official newspaper, the Völkischer Beobachter. Following the end of the Second World War, he was arrested, underwent denazification proceedings and was sentenced to three years in a labour camp.

== Early life ==
After finishing his studies at the Gymnasium in Munich, Weiss began a career as a military officer in the Bavarian Army. In 1911, he joined the 2nd Bavarian Foot Artillery Regiment as a Fahnenjunker (ensign) and, by 1913, he was commissioned as a Leutnant. During the First World War, Weiss first fought on the front lines and then was transferred in 1915 to the Luftstreitkräfte (air service) with Field Aviation Detachment 71. On one of his battle deployments, he was shot down, as a result of which he lost his left leg. In 1917, he was promoted to Oberleutnant before being transferred to the Bavarian War Ministry in 1918, shortly before the war ended. He was awarded the Iron Cross, 1st and 2nd class and the Bavarian Military Merit Order, 4th class. Through his activities in the Bavarian War Ministry's press department, Weiss came to a career in journalism after the war. In 1920, when the Reichswehr, which was busy reconstituting itself, could no longer find a job for him, he was discharged with the rank of Hauptmann.

Already by 1919, Weiss had been busying himself as a member of the state leadership of the Bavarian Citizens' Defense (Einwohnerwehr), through which he was appointed editor of the magazine Heimatland (Homeland), a publication with strong Nazi Party leanings. While a student at the Ludwig-Maximilians-Universität München between 1918 and 1920, he was active in various paramilitary organizations—including the Einwohnerwehr, the Deutsch-Völkischer Offiziersbund, the Altreichsflagge, the Bund Reichskriegsflagge, the Freikorps Oberland, and the Frontbann—where he served under Ernst Röhm as a staff officer for political affairs. He became involved early on in the Völkisch movement and was a fervent devotee of Adolf Hitler's ideas. Before 1933, the year of the NSDAP's seizure of power, he was judicially sentenced many times for political misdeeds. However, after Hitler and the Nazi Party had come to power, Weiss organized the "synchronization" of the press, though he also saw to it that individual journalists could keep their jobs despite the Editor Law (Schriftleitergesetz). Weiss never questioned Nazism.

== Nazi Party career ==
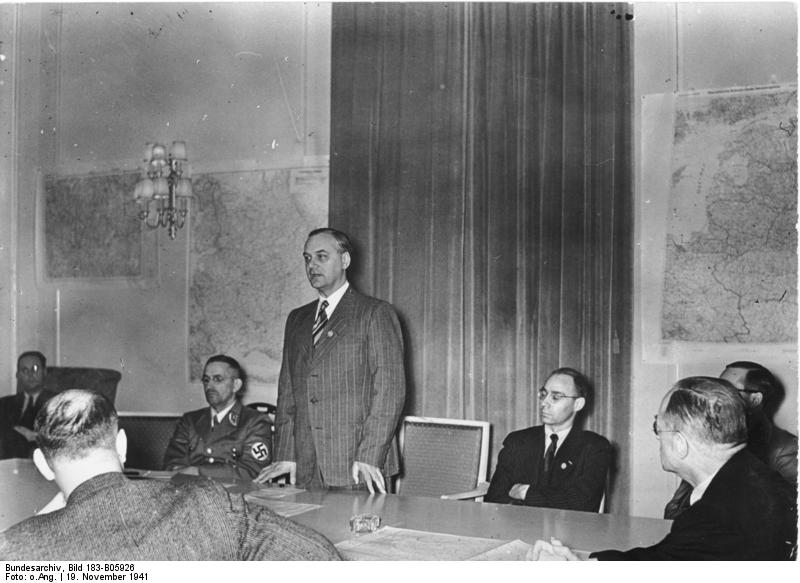
19 November 1941: Wilhelm Weiss sits during a press conference to the right of Alfred Rosenberg. To the left of Rosenberg sits his representative, Alfred Meyer.

In 1922 – as one of the first members – Weiss joined the Nazi Party and participated in the failed Beer Hall Putsch and the march on the Feldherrnhalle in Munich. After the Party was banned, Weiss held a position between 1924 and 1926 as editor-in-chief of the Völkischer Kurier. In January 1927, he became office chief at the editorial department of the Völkischer Beobachter (VB), the chief Nazi newspaper. He rejoined the re-established Nazi Party on 17 August 1927 (membership number 71,047).

In 1930, Weiss joined the Party's paramilitary unit, the Sturmabteilung (SA), with the rank of SA-Oberführer. He was placed on the Supreme SA Leadership staff and was given the leadership of the SA press office. Besides his work on the VB, Weiss also functioned as editor-in-chief of the antisemitic magazine Die Brennessel ("Stinging Nettle"), and in 1932, he became the leader of the Central Writing Leadership of the Nazi Party's central publishing house. In 1933, Weiss became acting editor-in-chief of the VB and, as of 1938, Alfred Rosenberg's successor as full-fledged editor-in-chief.

Seeking political office, Weiss was elected to the Reichstag on the Nazi electoral list in March 1933, shortly after Hitler came to power. Switching to electoral constituency 4 (Potsdam I) in November 1933 and to constituency 2 (Berlin West) in 1936, he retained this seat until the fall of the Nazi regime in 1945. Between 1934 and 1945, Weiss also was the chairman of the Reichsverband der Deutschen Presse (Reich Association of the German Press). He was promoted to SA-Gruppenführer in February 1934 and was appointed to the Volksgerichtshof (People's Court) in July of the same year. In 1935, Weiss became a member of the Reich Culture Senate and, in 1936, a Main Office Leader (Hauptamtsleiter) in the Nazi Party's Reich leadership. In 1937, came Weiss's promotion to SA-Obergruppenführer.

== Post-War life ==
In 1945, after the Second World War had ended, Weiss was interned and, on 15 July 1949, a denazification court sentenced him to three years in a labour camp, confiscated 30% of his wealth, and placed a 10-year ban on his professional activities. Shortly before he began his sentence, Wilhelm Weiss died, about a month short of his 58th birthday.

== Books ==
- Wilhelm Weiss (editor). Der Krieg im Westen (War in the West). Dargestellt nach den Berichten des Völkischen Beobachters. 301 pp. Eher Verlag, 1940. This popular book went through 5 editions by 1942.
- Wilhelm Weiss (editor). Triumph der Kriegskunst (Triumph of the Art of War). Das Kriegsjahr 1940 in der Darstellung des "Völkischen Beobachters". With a contribution from Generalfeldmarschall Kesselring. Eher Verlag 1941. High ranking accounts of Norway and the Fall of France; contributors include Kesselring, Todt, Prentzel, Lutzow and others.
- Wilhelm Weiss; Wilhelm Stuckart; Walter Buch; and others. Illustrierter Beobachter. Adolf Hitler - Ein Mann und sein Volk. Verlag Franz Eher Nachf., Munich (1936). This book is profusely Illustrated with reproductions of photos of Hitler from 1916 through 1936. It includes considerable text submitted by many prominent contributors in addition to Weiss and others listed.
