= Panzerbär =

German Nazi newspaper in Berlin (1945)

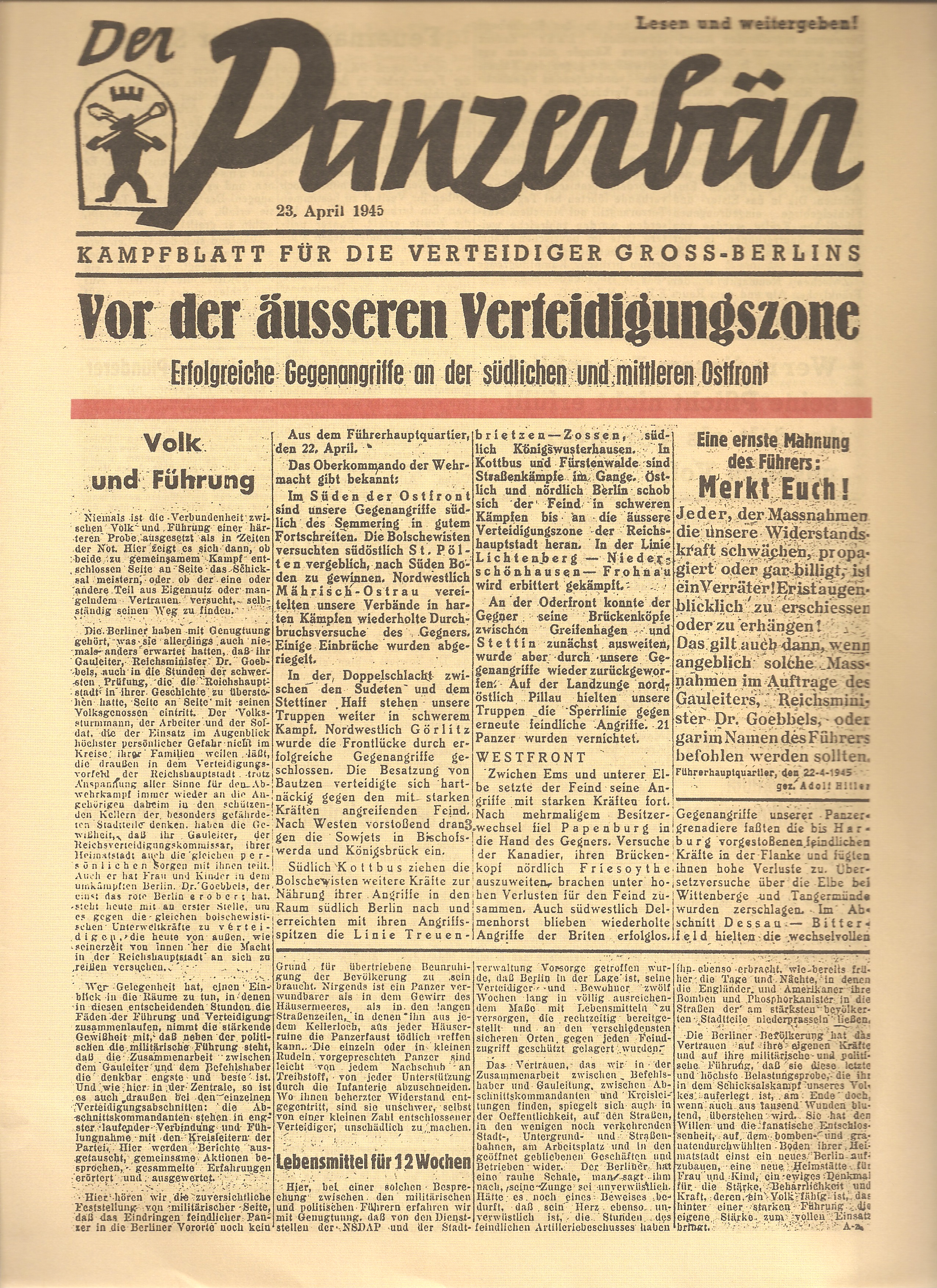
Front page of 23 April 1945 edition

Der Panzerbär—Kampfblatt für die Verteidiger Gross-Berlins ("The Armored Bear—Battle Sheet for the Defenders of Greater Berlin") was a German daily tabloid newspaper printed in the final days of the European theater of World War II in Berlin.

It was produced by the Reich Ministry of Propaganda and published by the Ullstein-Verlag. It only appeared seven times altogether between 23 and 29 April 1945. Its logo was a standing bear, referring to the coat of arms of Berlin, holding a shovel and a Panzerfaust anti-tank weapon on its shoulders. It reported on and provided Nazi propaganda regarding the Battle of Berlin against the Soviet Red Army.

== See also ==
- Other newspapers of Nazi Germany:
  - Der Angriff ("The Attack"), Joseph Goebbels' Berlin-based newspaper
  - Berliner Arbeiterzeitung ("Berlin Workers Newspaper"), Gregor and Otto Strasser's newspaper, representing the Strasserite wing of the Nazi Party
  - Illustrierter Beobachter ("Illustrated Observer"), illustrated companion to the Völkischer Beobachter
  - Das Reich, a weekly newspaper founded by Goebbels
  - Das Schwarze Korps ("The Black Corps"), the official newspaper of Heinrich Himmler's Schutzstaffel (SS)
  - Der Stürmer ("The Stormer"), Julius Streicher's Nuremberg-based virulently antisemitic and frequently semi-pornographic newspaper
  - Völkischer Beobachter ("People's Observer"), the official Nazi newspaper, published in Munich
