= Georg Kareski =

German banker (1878–1947)

Georg Kareski (21 October 1878 – 2 or 3 August 1947) was a German banker and Jewish Revisionist Zionist activist known for publicly defending the Nuremberg Laws in an interview published in the Nazi newspaper Der Angriff in 1935.

Kareski was born in Posen (Poznań), then ruled by the German Empire on 21 October 1878.

In 1933, Revisionist Zionism in Germany was marginal; the Staatszionistische Organisation which was formed in 1933 was not a member either of the German Zionist umbrella organization or the international Revisionist Zionist movement. Kareski was one of the few German Jews who saw the Nazi revolution as an opportunity.

In 1935, Kareski was appointed director of the Reich Federation of Jewish Cultural Unions. On 23 December 1935, an interview with him was published in the Nazi newspaper Der Angriff. Although he did not comment on the denial of citizenship to German Jews, Kareski said that the Nuremberg Laws—which forbade marriage and sexual relationship between Jews and "people of German blood"—were necessary to preserve the integrity of the Jewish race. Although the content of the interview did not differ dramatically from the positions that other German Zionists had taken in attempted accommodation with the Nazi regime, Kareski's interview attracted more attention because of its publication in a Nazi newspaper and threats against Jews who differed from his views.

Kareski was backed by Herbert Hagen of the Nazi Sicherheitsdienst (SD), who argued that Zionism should be promoted and clandestine transport of Jews to Palestine encouraged.

As a result of his roles in Germany, Zionist Germans repudiated him and severely criticized his actions, including a campaign by the Hitachduch Olej Germania (HOG), linked to the Zionistische Vereinigung für Deutschland that already expelled Kareski from their ranks in 1933. In 1937, he traveled to Palestine where he was accused by the HOG of being a traitor, spy, and informer. He nevertheless migrated to Palestine thereafter.

He died in Ramat Gan, Palestine, on 2 or 3 August 1947. After his death, some of his admirers wanted to name a street after him in Ramat Gan.
