= Der Angriff =

Newspaper of the Nazi Party in Berlin (1927–1945)

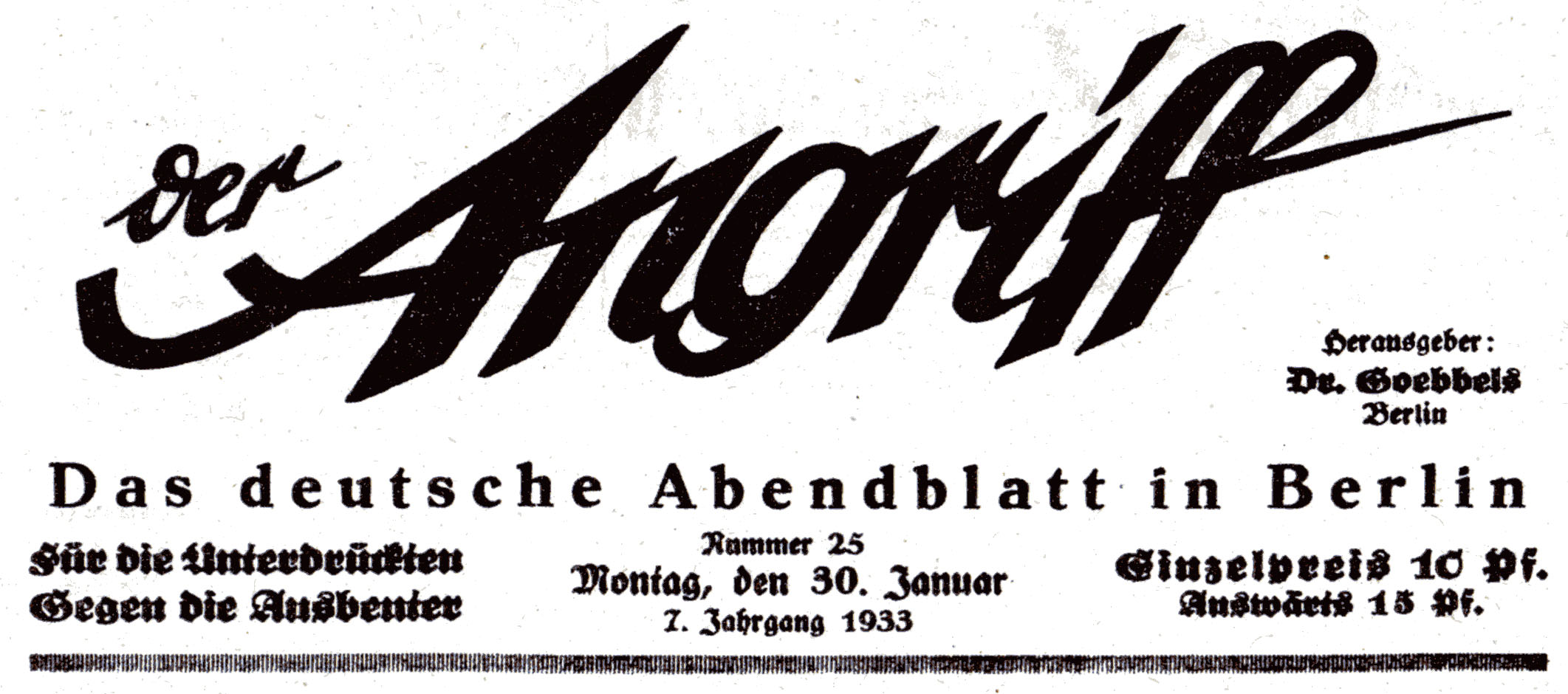
Masthead of Der Angriff from 30 January 1933 (Machtergreifung of Adolf Hitler)

Der Angriff (in English "The Attack") was the official newspaper of the Berlin Gau of the Nazi Party. Founded in 1927, the last edition of the newspaper was published on 24 April 1945.

== History ==
The newspaper was set up by Joseph Goebbels, who in 1926 had become the Nazi Party leader (Gauleiter) in Berlin, and the party provided most of the money needed to ensure publication. The paper was first founded to rally NSDAP members during the nearly two-year ban on the party in Berlin. Der Angriff was conceived as a mass circulation paper that fought the hated "System" with rude and aggressive language. Antiparliamentarism and antisemitism were its self-defining themes. The most regular contributors were party functionaries; lead articles were usually written by the publisher, Goebbels, until 1933, and signed "Dr. G." Willi Krause, using the pen name Peter Hagen, was its first editor-in-chief. He was succeeded first by Julius Lippert, then in 1933 by Karoly Kampmann, and from 1935, by Goebbels's trusted friend Hans Schwarz van Berk. A further attraction of the paper were the political caricatures by Hans Schweitzer.

Der Angriff was first published on 4 July 1927 by the Angriff Press. Its motto was "For the oppressed against the exploiters". At first appearing once a week, then starting 1 October 1929 twice a week, Der Angriff became a daily newspaper with the subtitle "The German Evening Paper in Berlin" after 1 November 1930. After 1 October 1932 it published twice daily as "The Attack at Noon" and "Night Attack". After 1 February 1933, it appeared as the "Daily Newspaper of the German Labor Front" from the Eher Press, with Goebbels remaining as the publisher. It contained principally party propaganda, agitation against the Weimar Republic, and antisemitism; among many others it regularly attacked Bernhard Weiss, the deputy head of the Berlin police, who was Jewish. For this it was temporarily banned on 4 November 1931 by Albert Grzesinski, Berlin's chief of police.

Circulation of the newspaper was small during its first three years, but grew dramatically after the Reichstag election of September 1930. There were almost 60,000 readers by the end of 1930, about 80,000 in March 1931, and 110,600 on the eve of the July 1932 Reichstag election, after which circulation began a decline. After the Nazis gained political power in Germany on 30 January 1933, the importance of the newspaper slowly decreased. When the Allies started the bombing campaign against Berlin, the circulation was increased to keep up the morale of Berliners.

An interview was conducted with Georg Kareski, a German-Jewish Banker. This interview was published on 23 December 1935, in which Georg publicly defends the antisemitic Nuremberg Laws as means to preserve the integrity of the Jewish race. While there were many other German Zionists who made similar statements, Georg's statement stood out due to threats against Jews with differing opinions and the interview being published in a Nazi newspaper.

After 19 February 1945 Der Angriff was merged with the Berliner Illustrierte Nachtausgabe (Berlin Illustrated Night Edition). The last edition was published on 24 April 1945.

== Related publications ==
- Nacht-Angriff was a daily paper also published by Goebbels. Issues in 1932 are described as "6. Jahrgang" (Year 6).
- Der Gegen-Angriff: antifaschistische Wochenschrift (The Counterattack: anti-fascist weekly newspaper) was an anti-fascist weekly published in Prague between 1933 and 1936 (139 weekly issues); and there were also Parisian and Swiss editions.

== In popular culture ==
- In the 1942 film Casablanca, a Nazi civilian whom Rick Blaine bars from his casino angrily says that he will report the snub to Der Angriff.
- In the 1968 episode "War Takes a Holiday" of the TV sitcom Hogan's Heroes, Colonel Hogan uses a false copy of Der Angriff to perpetrate a hoax that an armistice has been declared.
- In the 1984 made-for-TV film The Jesse Owens Story, Der Angriff posted derogatory opinion regarding the African-American athletes competing at the 1936 Summer Olympics in Berlin.
- Der Angriff is featured heavily in Season 4 of Babylon Berlin, and its headquarters are the scene of an attempted coup within the NSDAP.

== See also ==
- Other newspapers of Nazi Germany:
  - Berliner Arbeiterzeitung ("Berlin Workers Newspaper"), Gregor and Otto Strasser's newspaper, representing the Strasserite wing of the Nazi Party
  - Illustrierter Beobachter ("Illustrated Observer"), illustrated companion to the Völkischer Beobachter
  - Panzerbär ("The Panzer Bear"), a tabloid Nazi newspaper intended for the troops defending Berlin from the Red Army
  - Das Reich, a weekly newspaper founded by Goebbels
  - Das Schwarze Korps ("The Black Corps"), the official newspaper of Heinrich Himmler's Schutzstaffel (SS)
  - Der Stürmer ("The Stormer"), Julius Streicher's Nuremberg-based virulently antisemitic and frequently semi-pornographic newspaper
  - Völkischer Beobachter ("People's Observer"), the official Nazi newspaper, published in Munich
