= Gabriel Mälesskircher =

German painter

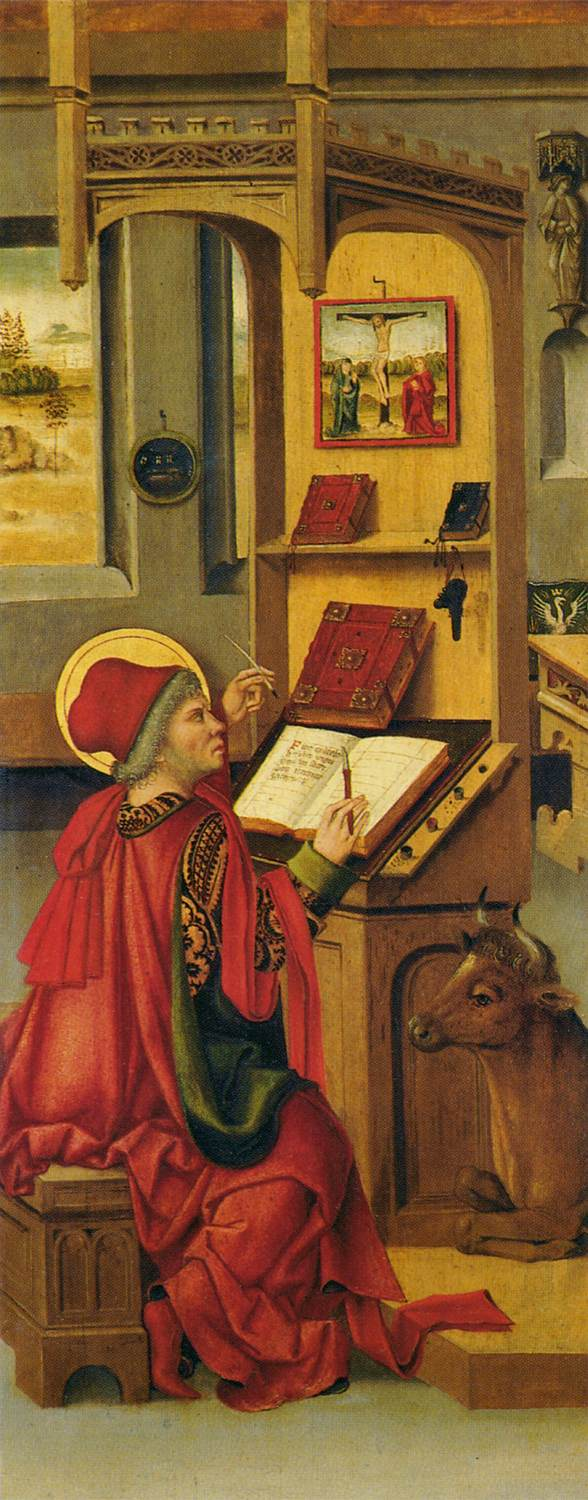
St.Luke, from the Lives of the Evangelists

Gabriel Mälesskircher, or Mäleßkircher (pronounced [ˈmɛləskɪʁçɐ]; c. 1425/30 – c. 1495) was a German painter; active in Southern Bavaria. He was a representative of the "Second Munich School of Painting".

== Life and work ==
Part of his apprenticeship period may have been spent in the Netherlands. He is documented as having been in Munich after 1461. He served several terms as the head of the Guild of St. Luke (painter's guild) and became a member of the city council in 1469. He was elected the Zweiter Bürgermeister (assistant mayor) in 1485. That same year, he purchased the Schloss Kempfenhausen on the Starnberger See. The Mäleßkircherstraße in the Daglfing district of Munich is named after him.

Much of his work was done on behalf of Tegernsee Abbey, because around 1450 he married Anna Ayrenschmalz, the sister of its Abbott, Konrad Ayrenschmalz (died 1492). Thirteen altarpieces created for the abbey (now in various museums) are considered to be his most important works. This includes scenes from the lives of the Four Evangelists, now at the Museo Thyssen-Bornemisza in Madrid. He also worked for Raitenhaslach Abbey and Rottenbuch Abbey. His workshop was very productive and, at one time, included Michael Wolgemut, of Nuremberg, who would become the teacher of Albrecht Dürer.

In 1470, documents indicate that he received a major commission from Sigismund, Duke of Bavaria, which is believed to have been for work at Fürstenfeld Abbey. Much of his major work from 1474 to 1479 may be seen in the Galerie Schloss Schleißheim, the Bayerische Nationalmuseum and the Alte Pinakothek.

He died in Munich during an outbreak of the plague. After his death, the workshop passed to his son, Caspar, who had been operating it since about 1485, when his father's health began to decline.

== Scenes from the Lives of the Evangelists (1478) ==
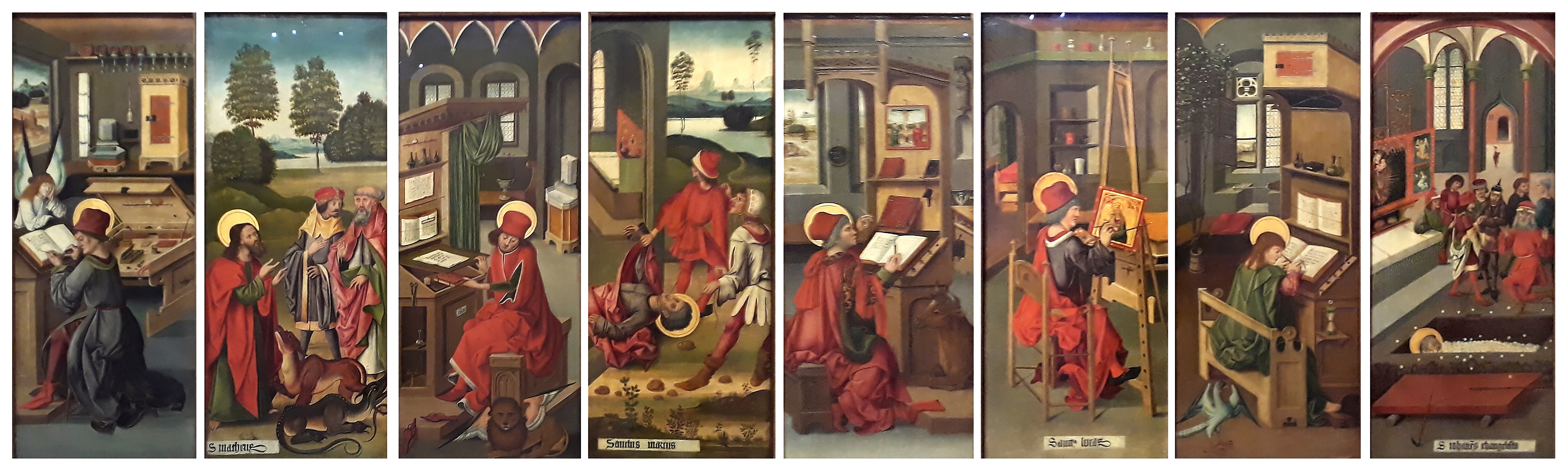
From left to right: St. Matthew, St. Matthew taming the dragons, St. Mark, Martyrdom of St. Mark, St. Luke, St. Luke painting the Virgin,
St. John, The miracle of the hosts at St.John's tomb
