= Illustrierter Beobachter =

Nazi propaganda magazine (1926–45)

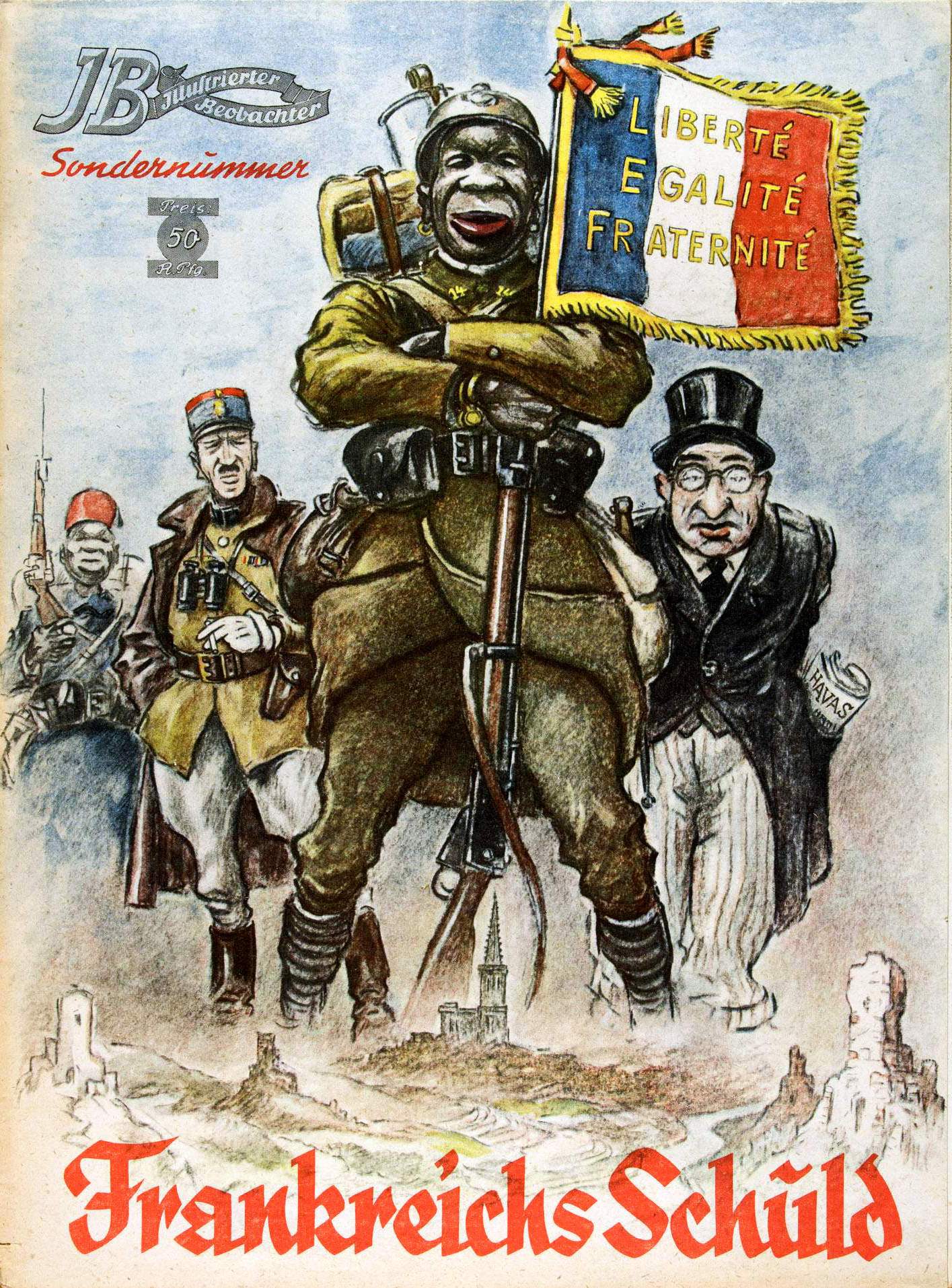
One of Illustrierter Beobachter special issue "France's Guilt" covers in 1940, depicting two French African soldiers, Charles de Gaulle and a Jewish man in a top hat with a flag, bearing the words Liberté, Egalité, Fraternité (see: Black Horror on the Rhine)

Illustrierter Beobachter (Illustrated Observer) was an illustrated propaganda magazine which the German Nazi Party published. It was published from 1926 to 1945 in Munich, and edited by Hermann Esser. It began as a monthly publication and its first issue showed members of the Bamberger Nationalist Party marching in front of a Jewish Synagogue and denounced Jacob Rosny Rosenstein, a potential Nobel Laureate, as a "disgrace to German culture". Special editions denounced England and France for starting the war.

== See also ==
- Other newspapers of Nazi Germany:
  - Der Angriff ("The Attack"), Josef Goebbels' Berlin-based newspaper
  - Berliner Arbeiterzeitung ("Berlin Workers Newspaper"), Gregor and Otto Strasser's newspaper, representing the Strasserite wing of the Nazi Party
  - Panzerbär ("The Panzer Bear"), a tabloid Nazi newspaper intended for the troops defending Berlin from the Red Army
  - Das Reich, a weekly newspaper founded by Goebbels
  - Das Schwarze Korps ("The Black Corps"), the official newspaper of Heinrich Himmler's Schutzstaffel (SS)
  - Der Stürmer ("The Stormer"), Julius Streicher's Nuremberg-based virulently antisemitic and frequently semi-pornographic newspaper
  - Völkischer Beobachter ("People's Observer"), the official Nazi newspaper, published in Munich
- Kladderadatsch, liberal satirical German-language magazine
