= Völkischer Beobachter =

Newspaper of the Nazi Party (1920–1945)

- Front page of the 31 January 1933 edition. The headline reads: "A historic day: First Acts of Hitler's Reich Government – Völkischer Beobachter interviews Reich Minister of the Interior Frick – New cabinet holds first meeting"
- Owner: Adolf Hitler
- Editor: Dietrich Eckart, Alfred Rosenberg, Wilhelm Weiss
- Founded: 25 December 1920
- Ceased publication: 30 April 1945
- Political alignment: Nazi Party
- Language: German
- Country: Nazi Germany
- Circulation: 1.7 million (as of 1944)

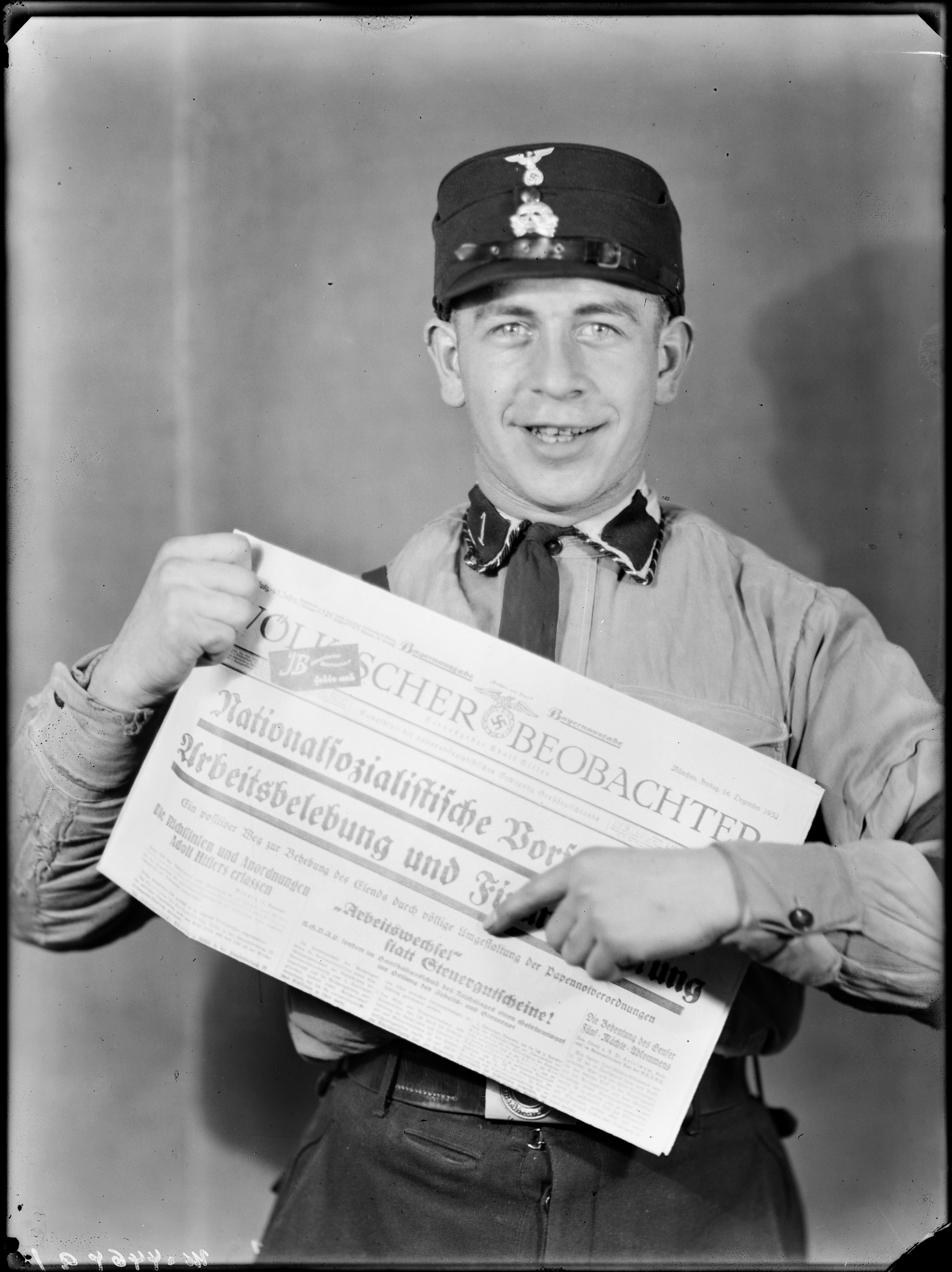
Promotional photo of a uniformed SS member with a 1932 issue of the Nazi Party organ Völkischer Beobachter, pointing at "Rather job change than tax credits"

The Völkischer Beobachter (pronounced [ˈfœlkɪʃɐ bəˈʔoːbaxtɐ]; "Völkisch Observer") was the newspaper of the Nazi Party (NSDAP) from 25 December 1920. It first appeared weekly, then daily from 8 February 1923. For 24 years it formed part of the official public face of the Nazi Party until its last edition at the end of April 1945. The paper was banned and ceased publication in November 1923, after Adolf Hitler's arrest for leading the unsuccessful Beer Hall Putsch in Munich, and resumed publication February 1925, the approximate date of the relaunching of the Party.

== History ==
The "fighting paper of the National Socialist movement of Greater Germany", or "Kampfblatt der nationalsozialistischen Bewegung Großdeutschlands" as it called itself, had its origin as the Münchener Beobachter, or "Munich Observer", an antisemitic semi-weekly scandal-oriented paper which in 1918 was acquired by Alfred Rosenberg with financial backing by Käthe Bierbaumer and, in August 1919, was renamed Völkischer Beobachter (see Völkisch and Völkisch movement).

By December 1920, the paper was heavily in debt. The Thule Society was thus receptive to an offer to sell the paper to the Nazis for 60,000 Papiermark. Major Ernst Röhm, who was an early member of the German Workers' Party, forerunner of the Nazi Party, and Dietrich Eckart, one of Hitler's earliest mentors, persuaded Röhm's commanding officer, Major General Franz Ritter von Epp, to provide the money from German Army funds for the paper to be purchased. The loan was secured with Eckart's house and possessions as collateral, and Dr. Gottfried Grandel, an Augsburg chemist and factory owner, who was Eckart's friend and a funder of the Party, as guarantor. After the Nazis acquired the paper, Eckart was its first editor. It was the party's primary official organ.

In 1921, Adolf Hitler, who had taken full control of the NSDAP earlier that year, acquired all shares in the company, making him the sole owner of the publication.

In early 1923 Hitler replaced Eckart as editor with Alfred Rosenberg. Rosenberg was replaced in turn by Wilhelm Weiss.

The income from sales alone did not support the paper. It sustained itself by selling non-interest-bearing promissory notes to party members and received loans and grants from wealthy patrons such as Helene Bechstein. The book publishing company, which Amann successfully expanded, later became the financial backbone. The Illustrierter Beobachter founded in 1926, was also a success. In addition, the followers were repeatedly reminded of their obligation to become subscribers and to advertise them.

During the Nazi rise to power, the newspaper reported general news but also party activities, presenting them as almost constant successes. Guidelines for propagandists urged that all posters, insofar as the police allowed, contain propaganda for it, and all meetings should be announced in it, although reports should be sent to the Propaganda Department, which would then forward corrected versions to the paper. Posters did indeed urge reading it. When Hitler was banned from public speaking, it was the main vehicle to propagate his views.

Joseph Goebbels published articles in the Völkischer Beobachter to attack the United States for criticizing anti-Jewish measures, as well as the communist Soviet Union. Both before and during World War Two The party newspaper frequently featured triumphant headlines, antisemitic (and other) conspiracy theories, and obsessed over racist ideology. The front page of Völkischer Beobachter on 24 May 1944 featured a headline claiming U.S. President Franklin D. Roosevelt had been planning to bring the United States into war with Germany since summer 1941 based off a general's testimony. The front page also featured an article discussing Spain's history leading up to Francisco Franco, justified the Spanish Inquisition conducted by the Catholic Church at the end of the Reconquista against Jews and Muslims in medieval Spain, as they were "foreign growths on the national body, hundreds of thousands of Jews and Moors were eliminated by the sword", and it was needed to "unify" Spain into one nation.

The final issues of the paper from the end of April and early May 1945 were not distributed.

According to top Soviet diplomat Vladimir Semyonov, Stalin suggested that the title of National Democratic Party of Germany's newspaper (a satellite party created in East Germany to attract former Nazi supporters) could be called the Völkischer Beobachter in order to appeal to the party's membership. The proposal was ultimately not adopted.

== Circulation ==
The circulation of the paper was initially about 8,000, but it increased to 25,000 in autumn 1923 due to strong demand during the occupation of the Ruhr. In that year Hitler replaced Eckart as editor with Alfred Rosenberg, because Eckart's alcoholism had begun to get in the way of running the paper. Hitler softened the blow by making it clear that he still regarded Eckart highly. "His accomplishments are everlasting!" Hitler said, he just was not constitutionally able to run a big business like a daily newspaper. "I would not be able to do it, either," according to Hitler, "I have been fortunate that I got a few people who know how to do it. ... It would be as if I tried to run a farm! I wouldn't be able to do it."

The publication of the paper ceased on the prohibition of the Party after the failed Beer Hall Putsch of 9 November 1923, but it resumed on the party's refoundation on 26 February 1925. The circulation rose along with the success of the Nazi movement, reaching more than 120,000 in 1931, 1.2 million in 1941, and 1.7 million by 1944. It sold 310,000 copies in 1933 and 982,000 copies in 1940.

== See also ==
- Other newspapers of Nazi Germany:
  - Der Angriff ("The Attack"), Josef Goebbels' Berlin-based newspaper
  - Berliner Arbeiterzeitung ("Berlin Workers Newspaper"), Gregor and Otto Strasser's newspaper, representing the Strasserite wing of the Nazi Party
  - Illustrierter Beobachter ("Illustrated Observer"), illustrated companion to the Völkischer Beobachter
  - Panzerbär ("The Panzer Bear"), a tabloid Nazi newspaper intended for the troops defending Berlin from the Red Army
  - Das Reich, a weekly newspaper founded by Goebbels
  - Das Schwarze Korps ("The Black Corps"), the official newspaper of Heinrich Himmler's Schutzstaffel (SS)
  - Der Stürmer ("The Stormer"), Julius Streicher's Nuremberg-based virulently antisemitic and frequently semi-pornographic newspaper
