= Parole der Woche =

Nazi propaganda wall newspaper

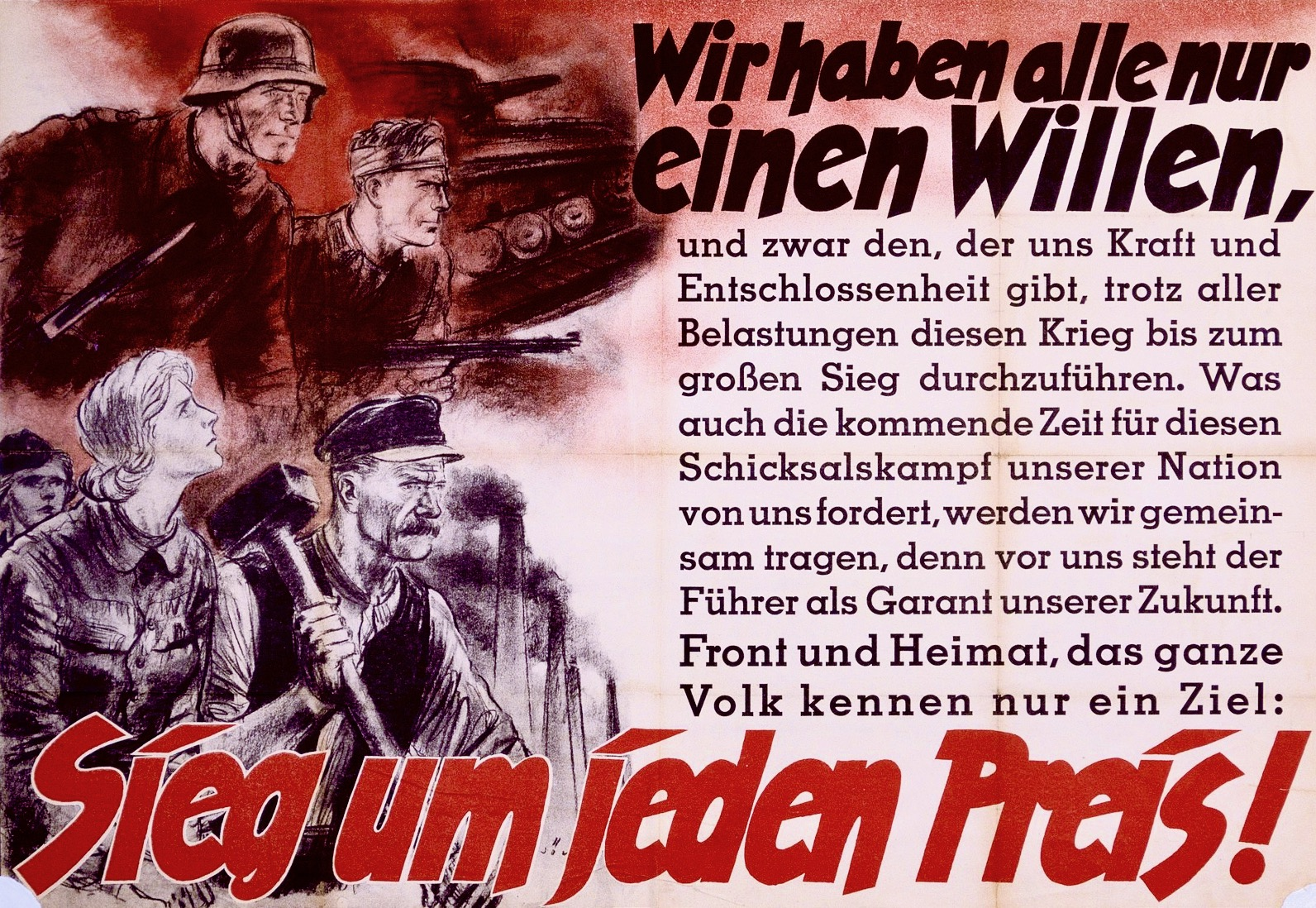
"We all have only one resolve... Victory at all costs!" (29 April 1942)

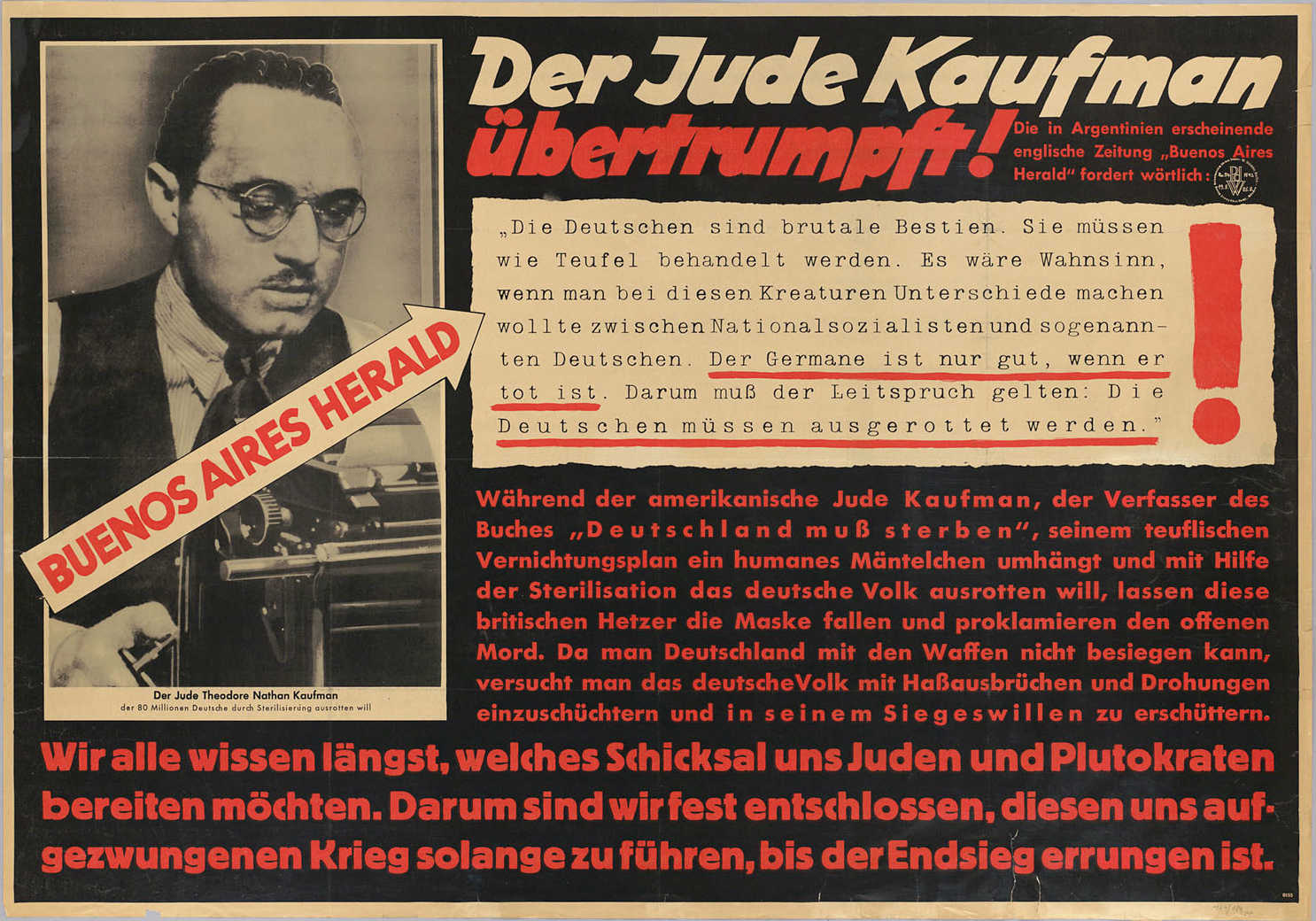
"The Jew Kaufman triumphs!" (19 August 1942)

Parole der Woche ("Slogan of the Week" or "Word of the Week") was a wall newspaper published by the Reichspropagandaleitung der NSDAP (propaganda department of the Nazi Party) from 1937 to 1943. Historian Jeffrey Herf describes Parole der Woche as "the most ubiquitous and intrusive aspect of Nazism's visual offensive ... no form of Nazi visual propaganda made so crucial a contribution to the regime's presentation of ongoing events".

== Establishment ==
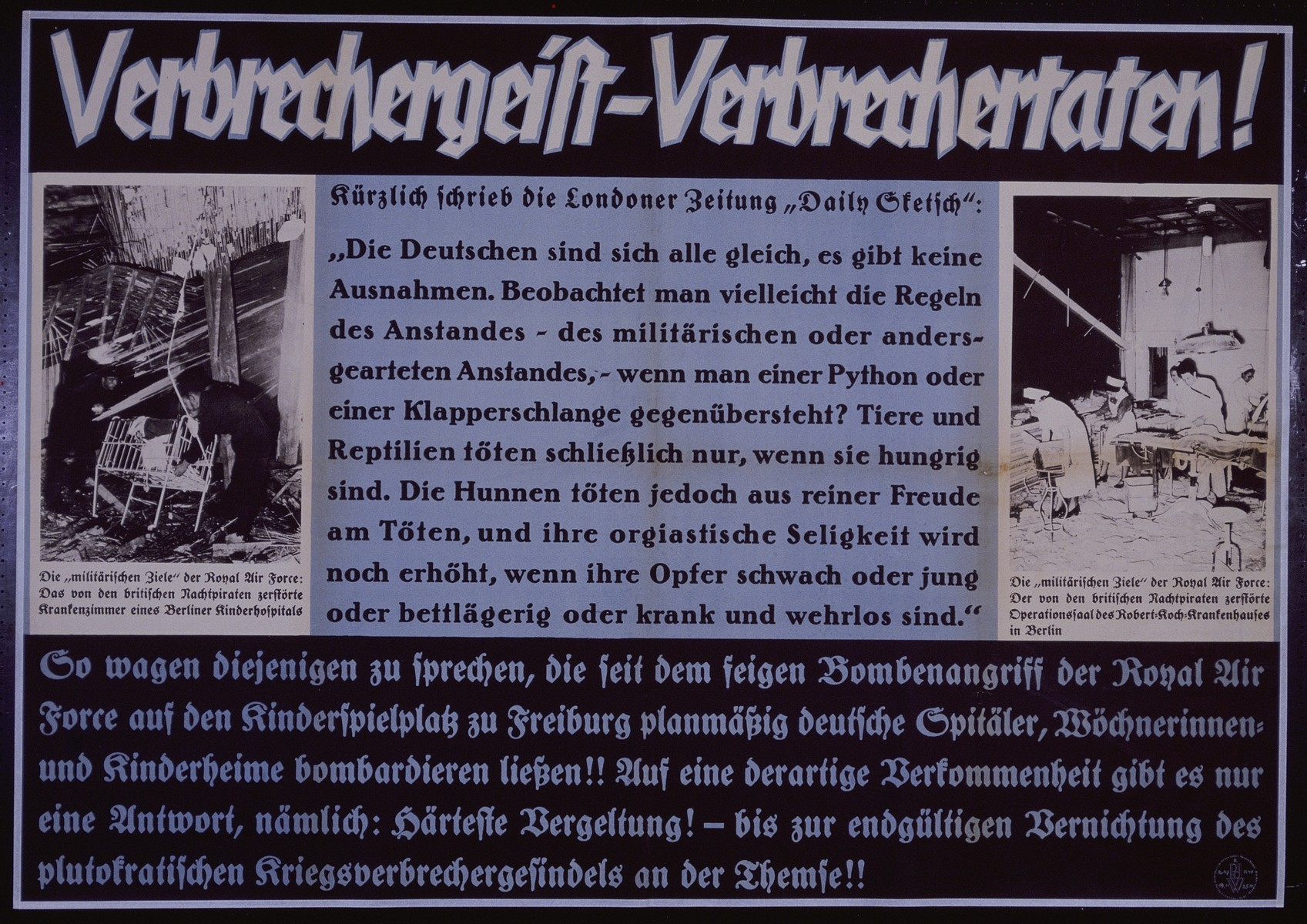
Criticizes the bombing of Germany as a "criminal act" (18 November 1940)

Herf suggests that the Nazi artist Hans Schweitzer was influential in the establishment of Parole der Woche, which began to publish in October 1937. An article in Unser Wille und Weg, the internal newsletter of the RPL, stated in June 1936:

Parole der Woche must not be absent anywhere! It is the only official party wall newspaper of the NSDAP. It presents the unified words published by the Reich Propaganda Directorate that refer to the most important prevailing political events ... Parole der Woche must penetrate every last community in the nation.

On 23 September 1939, shortly after the outbreak of World War II, Nazi propaganda minister Joseph Goebbels emphasized the importance of posters to Nazi propaganda efforts, "above all" Parole der Woche.

== Themes and influence ==
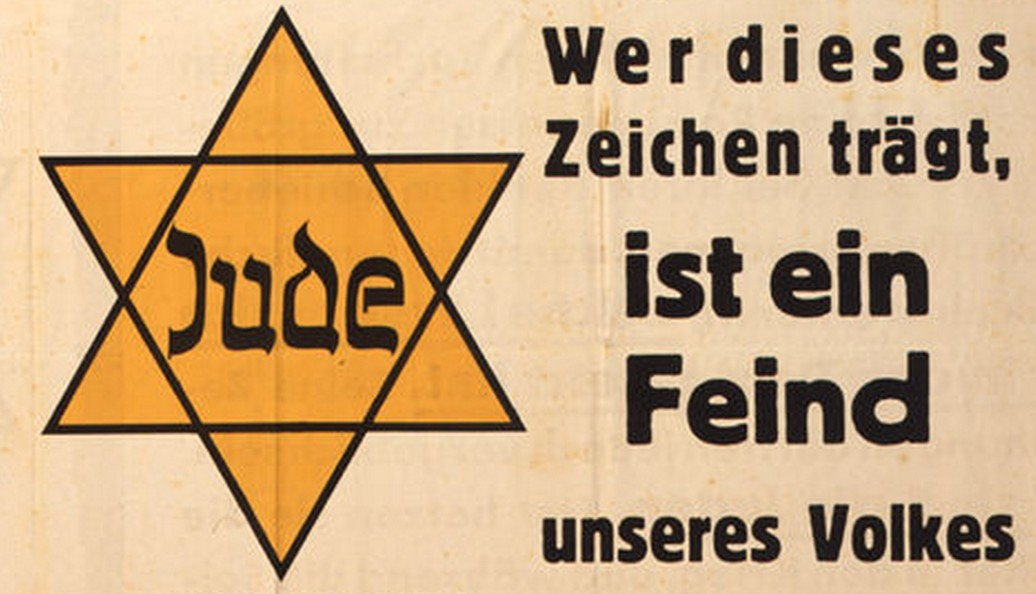
"Whoever wears this sign is an enemy of our people", from the 1 July 1942 issue

Parole der Woche combined multiple styles including those of editorials, leaflets, posters, and tabloid journalism. Although antisemitism was marginal in Parole der Woche until 1940, it later became a major theme, with one-third of the posters from 1941 to 1943 expressing antisemitism. Six issues dealt with Germany Must Perish! and the supposed Jewish-Allied intention to exterminate the German population. The posters repeatedly accused Jews of starting the war and intending to exterminate Germans. On the day before the German declaration of war against the United States, Parole der Woche published an issue with a chart showing the supposed international Jewish conspiracy which connected Roosevelt, Churchill, and Stalin. Herf argues that to Germans who had no other sources of information, "The image and text of the wall newspaper offered a seemingly compelling explanation of how the Jews, so few in number, could have been so successful in plotting against Germany." In this poster and others, antisemitism was combined with anti-Americanism, Anglophobia, and the conspiracy theory of Jewish Bolshevism.

The posters were published at the size of 135 by 54 centimetres (53 in × 21 in), or alternatively 212 by 100 centimetres (83 in × 39 in), in landscape. They were designed to be read by multiple people simultaneously from a distance of a few feet and used colors and graphics to attract, even compel, attention. Along with the posters, the Nazi Party also published miniature versions the size of playing cards, which were often attached to official communications. Around 125,000 poster-size copies were printed of each issue and posted in "every imaginable public place", such that, according to Herf, people in Germany "could not avoid" seeing it. In Spring/Summer 1940, the Nazi Party reported that there were 63,121 orders for the poster: 34,635 from the German Labor Front, 10,940 from doctors' organizations, and 5,960 from the owners of bars, restaurants, and similar businesses.

On May 5, 1943, the Reich Propaganda Directorate in Berlin informed regional propaganda offices that it was ending the Word of the Week due to the demands of war putting pressure on budgets and the calling up of more party members for active duty.

The posters were noted for their heavy use of exclamation marks, a hallmark of NS-Deutsch—the form of the German language used by the Nazi regime.

== Spoof ==
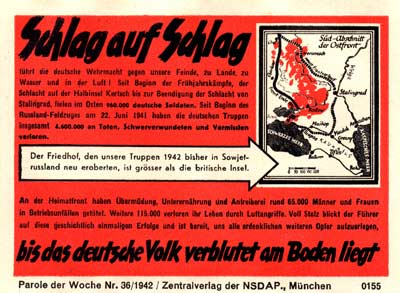
Spoof version "blow upon blow"

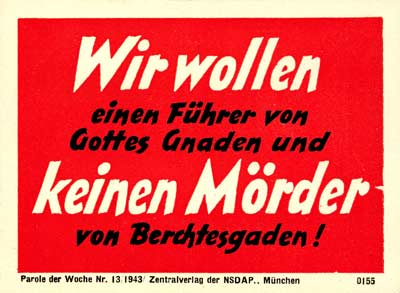
"Murderer from Berchtesgaden!" leaflet

From 1942 to 1945, small-sized spoof versions were produced as black propaganda by the Political Warfare Executive and dropped by Allied aircraft over Germany. On 11 March 1943, Allied aircraft distributed a leaflet about German victory:

Blow upon blow the German Armed Forces are pounding our enemies on land, on the sea and in the air! Since the beginning of the spring offensives, from the end of the fighting on the Kerch peninsula to the end of the battle for Stalingrad, 960,000 German soldiers have died. From the beginning of the Russian campaign on 22 June 1941, German troops have lost 4,600,000 dead, severely wounded or missing. The graveyard newly conquered by our troops in 1942 in Soviet Russia, is bigger than the British Isles.

Propaganda Warfare Executive manager Sefton Delmer wrote that this leaflet was a deliberate parody of a similar genuine Parole der Woche leaflet which spoke of actual German victories. In late 1943, one of these leaflets contained a quote misattributed to Hitler: "If the German people should collapse beneath its present burden, I would shed no tears for it—it would deserve its fate..." In 1944, one leaflet stated "We want a leader by the grace of God and not a murderer from Berchtesgaden!" This slogan became especially popular with anti-Nazi Germans and those who considered the war hopeless.

== Sources ==
- Gjems-Onstad, Erik (1981). Psykologisk krigføring i Norge: Durham – hemmelige operasjoner i Trøndelag mot tysk okkupasjonsmakt 1943–45 (in Norwegian). Sollia. ISBN 978-8290346015.
- Herf, Jeffrey (2006). The Jewish Enemy: Nazi Propaganda during the World War II and the Holocaust. Harvard University Press. ISBN 978-0674038592.
- Heyen, Franz Josef [in German] (1983). Parole der Woche: eine Wandzeitung im Dritten Reich 1936–1943 (in German). Deutscher Taschenbuch Verlag. ISBN 978-3423029360.
- Schmidt, Palle (1982). Sort propaganda (in Danish). Frihedsmuseets Venner. OCLC 895020078.
