= Propaganda in Nazi Germany =

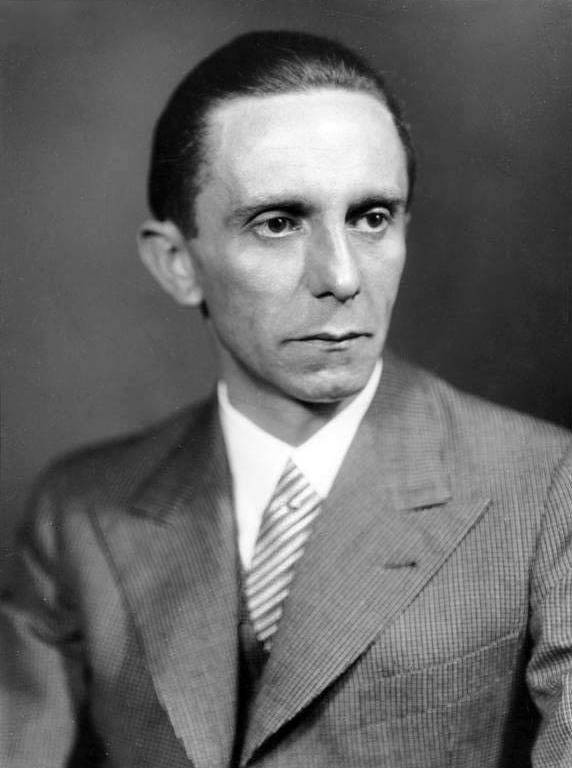
Joseph Goebbels, the head of Nazi Germany's Ministry of Public Enlightenment and Propaganda

Propaganda was a tool of the Nazi Party in Germany from its earliest days to the end of the regime in May 1945 at the end of World War II in Europe. As the party gained power, the scope and efficacy of its propaganda grew and permeated an increasing amount of space in Germany and, eventually, beyond.

Adolf Hitler's Mein Kampf (1925) provided the groundwork for the party’s later methodology while the newspapers, the Völkischer Beobachter and later Der Angriff, served as the early practical foundations for later propaganda during the party's formative years. These were later followed by many media types including books, posters, magazines, photos, art, films, and radio broadcasts which took increasingly prominent roles as the party gained more power.

These efforts promulgated Nazi ideology throughout German society. Such ideology included promotion of Nazi policies and values at home, worldview beyond their borders, antisemitism, vilification of non-German peoples and anti-Nazi organizations, eugenics and eventually total war against the Allied Nations.

After Germany's defeat and subsequent surrender on 7 May 1945, the Allied governments banned all forms of Nazi propaganda and the organizations which produced and disseminated such materials during the years of denazification.

== Themes ==
Nazi propaganda promoted Nazi ideology by demonising the enemies of the Nazi Party, notably Jews and communists, but also capitalists and intellectuals. It promoted the values asserted by the Nazi regime, including heroic death, Führerprinzip (leader principle), Volksgemeinschaft (people's community), Blut und Boden (blood and soil), and pride in the Germanic Herrenvolk (master race).

Propaganda was also used to maintain the cult of personality around Führer und Reichskanzler Adolf Hitler, and to promote campaigns for eugenics and the annexation of German-speaking areas.
After Hitler had begun World War II by the invasion of Poland, Nazi propaganda vilified Germany's enemies, notably the United Kingdom, the Soviet Union, and the United States, and in 1943 exhorted the population to total war.

== History ==
=== Mein Kampf (1925) ===
Adolf Hitler devoted two chapters of his 1925 book Mein Kampf, itself a propaganda tool, to the study and practice of propaganda. He claimed to have learned the value of propaganda as a World War I infantryman exposed to very effective British and ineffectual German propaganda. The argument that Germany lost the war largely because of British propaganda efforts, expounded at length in Mein Kampf, reflected then-common German nationalist claims. Although untrue—German propaganda during World War I was mostly more advanced than that of the British—it became the official truth of the Nazi Germans thanks to its reception by Adolf Hitler.

Mein Kampf contains the blueprint of later Nazi propaganda efforts. Assessing his audience, Hitler wrote in chapter VI:

Propaganda must always address itself to the broad masses of the people. (...) All propaganda must be presented in a popular form and must fix its intellectual level so as not to be above the heads of the least intellectual of those to whom it is directed. (...) The art of propaganda consists precisely in being able to awaken the imagination of the public through an appeal to their feelings, in finding the appropriate psychological form that will arrest the attention and appeal to the hearts of the national masses. The broad masses of the people are not made up of diplomats or professors of public jurisprudence nor simply of persons who are able to form reasoned judgment in given cases, but a vacillating crowd of human children who are constantly wavering between one idea and another. (...) The great majority of a nation is so feminine in its character and outlook that its thought and conduct are ruled by sentiment rather than by sober reasoning. This sentiment, however, is not complex, but simple and consistent. It is not highly differentiated, but has only the negative and positive notions of love and hatred, right and wrong, truth and falsehood.

As to the methods to be employed, he wrote:

Propaganda must not investigate the truth objectively and, in so far as it is favorable to the other side, present it according to the theoretical rules of justice; yet it must present only that aspect of the truth which is favorable to its own side. (...) The receptive powers of the masses are very restricted, and their understanding is feeble. On the other hand, they quickly forget. Such being the case, all effective propaganda must be confined to a few bare essentials and those must be expressed as far as possible in stereotyped formulas. These slogans should be persistently repeated until the very last individual has come to grasp the idea that has been put forward. (...) Every change that is made in the subject of a propagandist message must always emphasize the same conclusion. The leading slogan must, of course, be illustrated in many ways and from several angles, but in the end one must always return to the assertion of the same formula.

=== Early Nazi Party (1919–1933) ===
Hitler put these ideas into practice with the reestablishment of the Völkischer Beobachter, a newspaper published by the Nazi Party (NSDAP) from December 1920 onwards, whose circulation reached 26,175 in 1929. It was joined in 1927 by Joseph Goebbels's Der Angriff, another unabashedly and crudely propagandistic paper.

During most of the Nazis' time in opposition, their means of propaganda remained limited. One of the earliest examples of Nazi propaganda was the stab-in-the-back myth, a conspiracy theory which maintained that Germany had not been defeated on the battlefield, but was instead betrayed by certain disloyal citizens – Jews, Bolsheviks, and politicians opposed to the Nazi party. With little access to mass media, the party continued to rely heavily on Hitler and a few others speaking at public meetings until 1929. One study finds that the Weimar government's use of pro-government radio propaganda slowed Nazi growth. In April 1930, Hitler appointed Goebbels head of party propaganda. Goebbels, a former journalist and Nazi Party officer in Berlin, soon proved his skills. Among his first successes was the organisation of riotous demonstrations that succeeded in having the American anti-war film All Quiet on the Western Front banned in Germany.

=== In power (1933–1939) ===
A 1937 anti-Bolshevik Nazi propaganda poster. The translated caption reads: "Bolshevism without a mask – large anti-Bolshevik exhibition of the NSDAP Gauleitung Berlin from 6 November to 19 December 1937 in the Reichstag building".

A major political and ideological cornerstone of Nazi policy was the unification of all ethnic Germans living outside the Reich's borders (e.g. in Austria and Czechoslovakia) under one Greater Germany. In Mein Kampf, Hitler denounced the pain and misery of ethnic Germans outside Germany, and declared the dream of a common fatherland for which all Germans must fight. Throughout Mein Kampf, he pushed Germans worldwide to make the struggle for political power and independence their main focus, made official in the Heim ins Reich policy beginning in 1938.

On 13 March 1933, a Ministry of Propaganda was established, with Goebbels as its Minister. Its goals were to establish enemies in the public mind: the external enemies which had imposed the Treaty of Versailles on Germany, and internal enemies such as Jews, Romani, homosexuals, Bolsheviks, and cultural trends including "degenerate art".

For months prior to the beginning of World War II in 1939, German newspapers and leaders had carried out a national and international propaganda campaign accusing Polish authorities of organising or tolerating violent ethnic cleansing of ethnic Germans living in Poland. On 22 August, Hitler told his generals:

I will provide a propagandistic casus belli. Its credibility doesn't matter. The victor will not be asked whether he told the truth.

The main part of this propaganda campaign was the false flag Operation Himmler, which was designed to create the appearance of Polish aggression against Germany, in order to justify the invasion of Poland.

Research finds that the Nazis' use of radio propaganda helped it consolidate power and enroll more party members.

There are a variety of factors that increased the obedience of German soldiers in terms of following the Nazi orders that were given to them regarding Jews. Omer Bartov, a professor on subjects such as German studies and European history, mentioned in his book, Hitler’s Army: Soldiers, Nazis, and War in the Third Reich, how German soldiers were told information that influenced their actions. Bartov mentioned that General Joachim Lemelsen, a corps commander, explained to his German troops regarding their actions toward Jews, "We want to bring back peace, calm and order to this land…" German leaders tried to make their soldiers believe that Jews were a threat to their society. Thus, German soldiers followed orders given to them and participated in the demonisation and mass murders of Jews. In other words, German soldiers saw Jews as a group that was trying to infect and take over their homeland. Bartov's description of Nazi Germany explains the intense discipline and unity that the soldiers had which played a role in their willingness to obey orders that were given to them. These feelings that German soldiers had toward Jews grew more and more as time went on as the German leaders kept pushing further for Jews to get out of their land as they wanted total annihilation of Jews.

=== World War II (1939–1945) ===
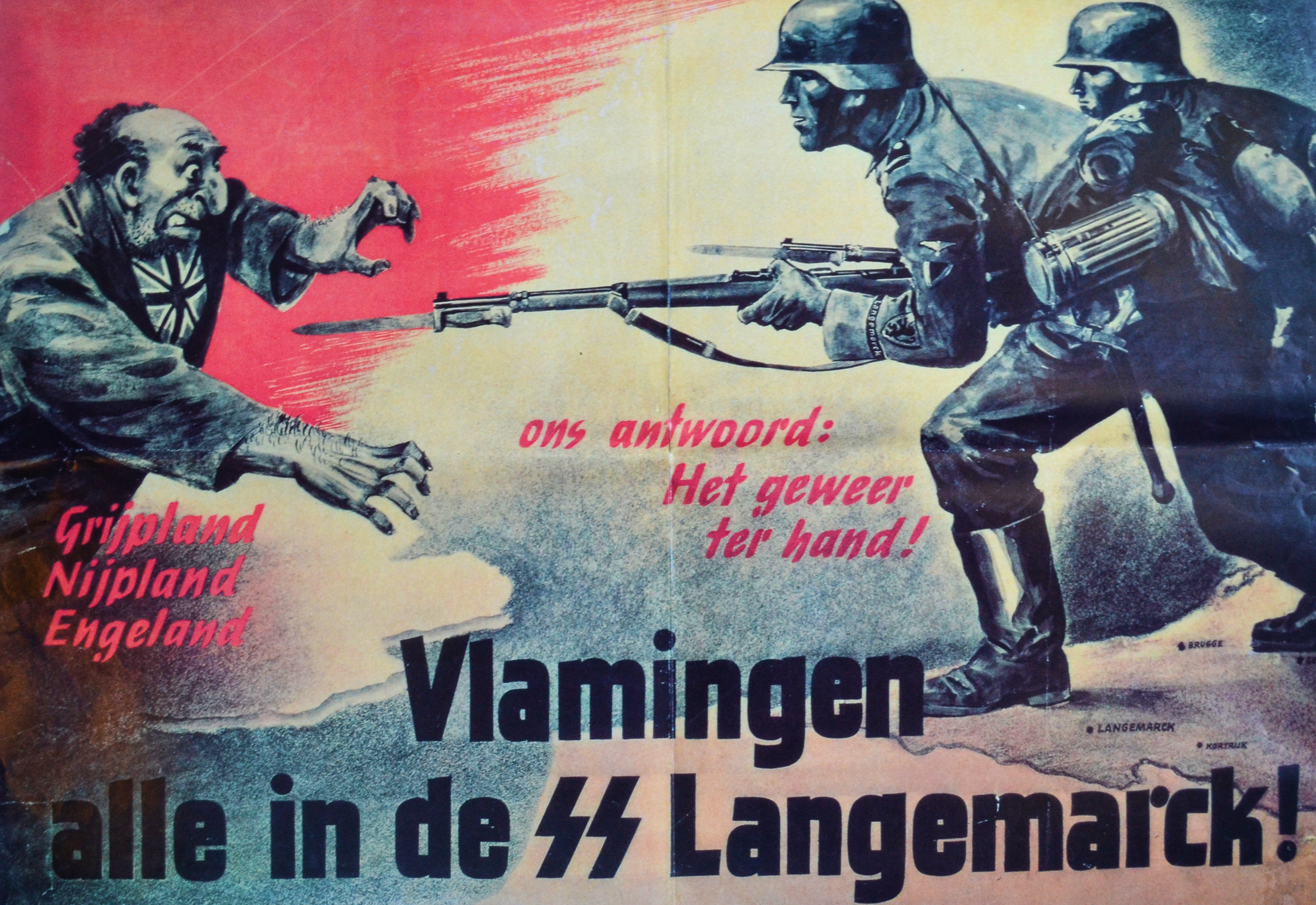
Propaganda recruiting poster of the 27th SS Volunteer Division "Langemarck" with the title "Flemings all in the SS Langemarck!"

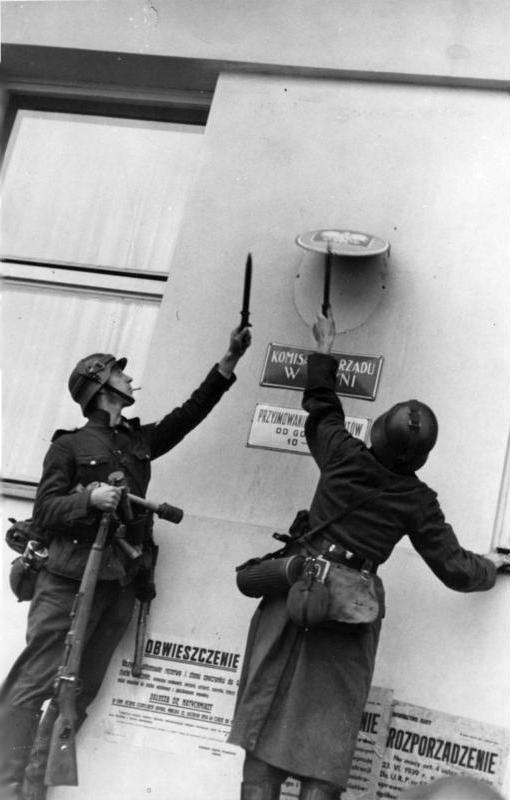
German soldiers removing Polish government insignia in Gdynia during the invasion of Poland in 1939

Until the conclusion of the Battle of Stalingrad on 2 February 1943, German propaganda emphasised the prowess of German arms and the humanity German soldiers had shown to the peoples of occupied territories. Pilots of the Allied bombing fleets were depicted as cowardly murderers and Americans in particular as gangsters in the style of Al Capone. At the same time, German propaganda sought to alienate Americans and British from each other, and both these Western nations from the Soviet Union. One of the primary sources for propaganda was the Wehrmachtbericht, a daily radio broadcast from the High Command of the Wehrmacht, the OKW. Nazi victories lent themselves easily to propaganda broadcasts and were at this point difficult to mishandle. Satires on the defeated, accounts of attacks, and praise for the fallen all were useful for Nazis. Still, failures were not easily handled even at this stage. For example, considerable embarrassment resulted when the Ark Royal proved to have survived an attack that German propaganda had hyped.

Goebbels instructed Nazi propagandists to describe the invasion of the Soviet Union (Operation Barbarossa) as the "European crusade against Bolshevism" and the Nazis then formed different units of the Waffen-SS consisting of mainly volunteers and conscripts.

After Stalingrad, the main theme switched to Germany as the main defender of what they called "Western European culture" against the "Bolshevist hordes". The introduction of the V-1 and V-2 "vengeance weapons" was emphasised to convince Britons of the hopelessness of defeating Germany.

==== Theresienstadt Ghetto propaganda ====
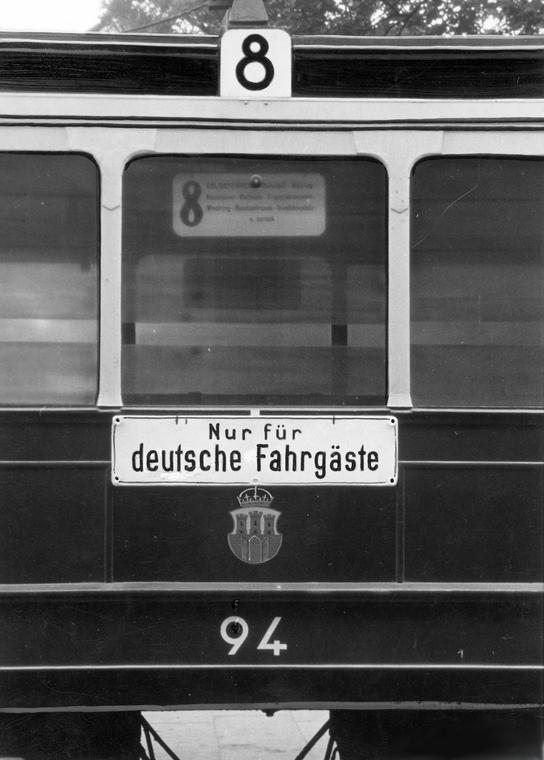
Nur für deutsche Fahrgäste ("Only for German Passengers"), a Nazi slogan used in occupied territories, mainly posted at entrances to parks, cafes, cinemas, theatres, and other facilities

On 23 June 1944, the Nazi regime permitted the Red Cross representative Maurice Rossel to visit the concentration camp Theresienstadt to dispel rumors about the Final Solution, which was intended to kill all Jews. In reality, Theresienstadt was a transit camp for Jews en route to extermination camps. In a sophisticated propaganda effort, fake shops and cafés were erected to imply that the Jews lived in relative comfort. The guests enjoyed the performance of a children's opera, Brundibár, written by inmate Hans Krása. The hoax was so successful for the Nazis that they went on to make a propaganda film Theresienstadt. The shooting of the film began on 26 February 1944. Directed by Kurt Gerron, it was meant to show how well the Jews lived under the "benevolent" protection of Nazi Germany. After the shooting, most of the cast, and even the filmmaker himself, were deported to the concentration camp of Auschwitz, where they were murdered. Hans Fritzsche, who had been head of the Radio Chamber, was tried and acquitted by the Nuremberg war crimes tribunal.

==== Antisemitism during World War II ====
Antisemitic wartime propaganda served a variety of purposes. A common theme throughout antisemitic Nazi propaganda was the dehumanization of Jews. It was hoped that people in Allied countries would be persuaded that Jews should be blamed for the war. Nazi propaganda was also largely used to justify the elimination of the Jews. The Nazis wished to ensure that German people were aware of the extreme measures being carried out against the Jews on their behalf, in order to incriminate them and thus guarantee their continued loyalty through fear by Nazi-conjectured scenarios of supposed post-war "Jewish" reprisals.

Especially from 1942 onwards,

the announcement that Jews were being exterminated served as a group unification factor to preclude desertion and force the Germans to continue fighting. Germans were fed the knowledge that too many atrocities had been committed, especially against the Jews, to allow for an understanding to be reached with the Allies.

— David Bankier (2002) The Use of Antisemitism in Nazi Wartime Propaganda

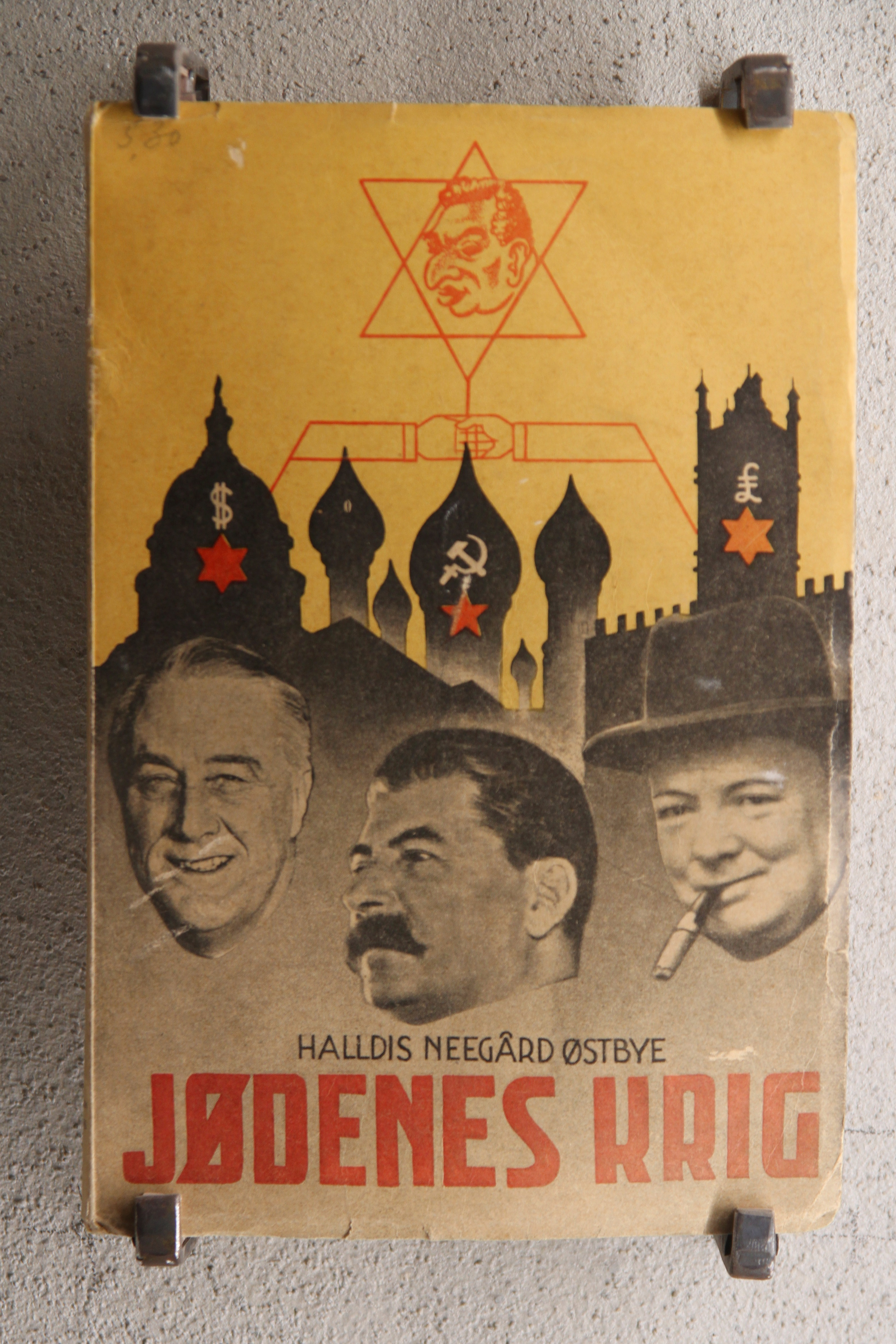
Antisemitic propaganda in German-occupied Norway, 1941

Nazi media vilified arch-enemies of Nazi Germany as Jewish (Franklin D. Roosevelt) or in the cases of Joseph Stalin and Winston Churchill abject puppets of an international Jewish conspiracy intent on ruining Germany and Nazism.

Problems in propaganda arose easily in this stage; expectations of success were raised too high and too quickly, which required explanation if they were not fulfilled, and blunted the effects of success, and the hushing of blunders and failures caused mistrust. The increasing hardship of the war for the German people also called forth more propaganda that the war had been forced on the German people by the refusal of foreign powers to accept their strength and independence. Goebbels called for propaganda to toughen up the German people and not make victory look easy.

After Hitler's death, his successor as chancellor of Germany, Goebbels, informed the Reichssender Hamburg radio station. The station broke the initial news of Hitler's death on the night of 1 May; an announcer claimed he had died that afternoon as a hero fighting against Bolshevism. Hitler's successor as head of state, Karl Dönitz, further asserted that the U.S. forces were continuing the war solely to spread Bolshevism within Europe.

== Media ==
=== Books ===
The Nazis and sympathisers published many propaganda books; some 20,000 new titles were published in the Reich annually, many of those being propaganda works. Most of the beliefs that would become associated with the Nazis, such as German nationalism, eugenics, and antisemitism had been in circulation since the 19th century, and the Nazis seized on this body of existing work in their own publications.

The most notable is Hitler's Mein Kampf, detailing his beliefs. The book outlines major ideas that would later culminate in World War II. It is heavily influenced by Gustave Le Bon's 1895 The Crowd: A Study of the Popular Mind, which theorised propaganda as a way to control the seemingly irrational behavior of crowds. Particularly prominent is the violent antisemitism of Hitler and his associates, drawing, among other sources, on the fabricated "The Protocols of the Elders of Zion" (1897), which implied that Jews secretly conspired to rule the world. This book was a key source of propaganda for the Nazis and helped fuel their common hatred against the Jews during World War II. For example, Hitler claimed that the international language Esperanto was part of a Jewish plot and makes arguments toward the old German nationalist ideas of "Drang nach Osten" and the necessity to gain Lebensraum ("living space") eastwards (especially in Russia). Other books such as Rassenkunde des deutschen Volkes ("Racial Science of the German People") by Hans Günther and Rasse und Seele ("Race and Soul") by Dr. Ludwig Ferdinand Clauß (published under different titles between 1926 and 1934) attempt to identify and classify the differences between the German, Nordic, or Aryan type and other supposedly inferior peoples. These books were used as texts in German schools during the Nazi era.

The pre-existing and popular genre of Schollen-roman, or novel of the soil, also known as blood and soil novels, was given a boost by the acceptability of its themes to the Nazis and developed a mysticism of unity.

The immensely popular "Red Indian" stories by Karl May were permitted despite the heroic treatment of the hero Winnetou and "coloured" races; instead, the argument was made that the stories demonstrated the fall of the Red Indians was caused by a lack of racial consciousness, to encourage it in the Germans. Other fictional works were also adapted; Heidi was stripped of its Christian elements, and Robinson Crusoe's relationship to Friday was made a master-slave one.

Children's books also made their appearance. In 1938, Julius Streicher published Der Giftpilz (The Poisonous Mushroom), a storybook that equated the Jewish people to poisonous mushrooms and aimed to educate children about the Jews. The book was an example of antisemitic propaganda and stated that "The following tales tell the truth about the Jewish poison mushroom. They show the many shapes the Jew assumes. They show the depravity and baseness of the Jewish race. They show the Jew for what he really is: The Devil in human form."

==== Textbooks ====
"Geopolitical atlases" emphasised Nazi schemes, demonstrating the "encirclement" of Germany, depicting how the prolific Slav nations would cause the German people to be overrun, and (in contrast) showing the relative population density of Germany was much higher than that of the Eastern regions (where they would seek Lebensraum). Textbooks would often show that the birth rate amongst Slavs was prolific compared to Germans. Geography textbooks stated how crowded Germany had become. Other charts would show the cost of disabled children as opposed to healthy ones, or show how two-child families threatened the birthrate. Math books discussed military applications and used military word problems, physics and chemistry concentrated on military applications, and grammar classes were devoted to propaganda sentences. Other textbooks dealt with the history of the Nazi Party. Elementary school reading text included large amounts of propaganda. Children were taught through textbooks that they were the Aryan master race (Herrenvolk) while the Jews were untrustworthy, parasitic, and Untermenschen (subhumans). Course content and textbooks unnecessarily included information that was propagandistic, an attempt to sway the children's views from an early age.

Maps showing the racial composition of Europe were banned from the classroom after many efforts that did not define the territory widely enough for party officials.

Fairy tales were put to use, with Cinderella being presented as a tale of how the prince's racial instincts lead him to reject the stepmother's alien blood (present in her daughters) for the racially pure maiden. Nordic sagas were likewise presented as the illustration of the Führerprinzip, which was developed with such heroes as Frederick the Great and Otto von Bismarck.

Literature was to be chosen within the "German spirit" rather than a fixed list of forbidden and required, which made the teachers all the more cautious although Jewish authors were impossible for classrooms. While only William Shakespeare's Macbeth and The Merchant of Venice were actually recommended, none of the plays were actually forbidden, even Hamlet, denounced for "flabbiness of soul."

Biology texts, however, were put to the most use in presenting eugenic principles and racial theories; this included explanations of the Nuremberg Laws, which were claimed to allow the German and Jewish peoples to co-exist without the danger of mixing. Science was to be presented as the most natural area for introducing the "Jewish Question" once teachers took care to point out that in nature, animals associated with those of their own species.

Teachers' guidelines on racial instruction presented both the handicapped and Jews as dangers. Despite their many photographs glamorising the "Nordic" type, the texts also claimed that visual inspection was insufficient, and genealogical analysis was required to determine their types and report any hereditary problems. However, the National Socialist Teachers League (NSLB) stressed that at primary schools, in particular, they had to work on only the Nordic racial core of the German Volk again and again and contrast it with the racial composition of foreign populations and the Jews.

==== Books in occupied countries ====
In occupied France, the German Institute encouraged the translation of German works although chiefly German nationalists, not ardent Nazis, produced a massive increase in the sale of translated works. The only books in English to be sold were English classics, and books with Jewish authors or Jewish subject matter (such as biographies) were banned, except for some scientific works. Control of the paper supply allowed Germans the easy ability to pressure publishers about books.

=== Comics ===
The Nazi-controlled government in German-occupied France produced the Vica comic book series during World War II as a propaganda tool against the Allied forces. The Vica series, authored by Vincent Krassousky, represented Nazi influence and perspective in French society, and included such titles as Vica Contre le service secret Anglais, and Vica défie l'Oncle Sam.

=== Caricature ===
Popular Nazi caricaturists began associating Jews with animals, in order to dehumanize them.

The Nazis used caricatures in postcards depicting Jews as Glücksschwein, literally "lucky pig" in German, meaning lucky charm. One example features a poem wishing the recipient good fortune, with the punchline being a figure with a pig's head placed atop a man dressed in traditional Orthodox characteristics such as peyos and a fedora associated with Hasidic Jews. The joke relied on the audience knowing that Jewish dietary laws, Kashrut, forbid the consumption of pork. Other postcards depicted Jewish men eating pork in secret, one shows a man winking beneath a sign reading "You Can Eat Pork" framing Jewish people as hypocrites who publicly performed religious devotion while privately indulging in forbidden acts. This tapped into a broader antisemitic prejudice that Jewish piety was merely a front for gluttony and deception.

=== Films ===
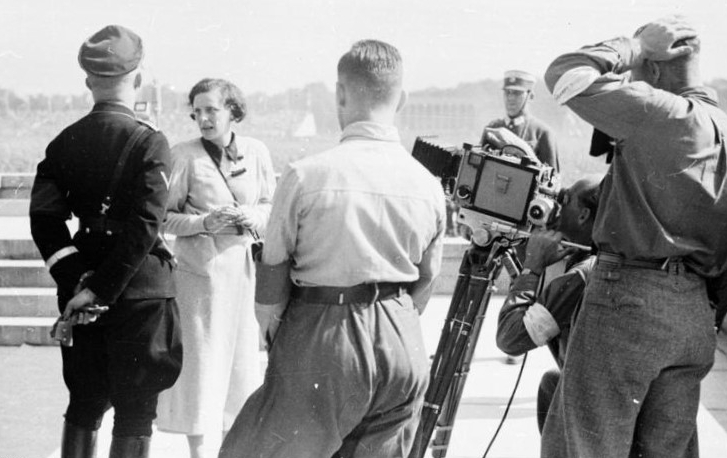
Leni Riefenstahl with Heinrich Himmler at Nuremberg in 1934

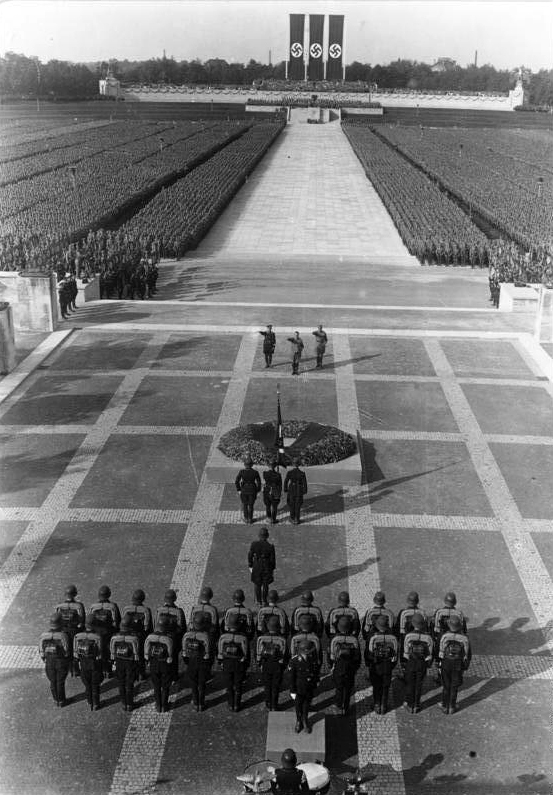
The Totenehrung (honouring of dead) at the 1934 Nuremberg Rally. SS leader Heinrich Himmler, Adolf Hitler, and SA leader Viktor Lutze (from L to R) on the stone terrace in front of the Ehrenhalle (Hall of Honour) in the Luitpoldarena. In the background is the crescent-shaped Ehrentribüne (literally: tribune of honour).

The Nazis produced many films to promote their views, using the party's Department of Film for organising film propaganda. An estimated 45 million people attended film screenings put on by the NSDAP. Reichsamtsleiter Karl Neumann declared that the goal of the Department of Film was not directly political in nature, but was rather to influence the culture, education, and entertainment of the general population.

On 22 September 1933, a Department of Film was incorporated into the Chamber of Culture. The department controlled the licensing of every film prior to its production. Sometimes the government selected the actors for a film, financed the production partially or totally, and granted tax breaks to the producers. Awards for "valuable" films would decrease taxes, thus encouraging self-censorship among movie makers.

Under Goebbels and Hitler, the German film industry became entirely nationalised. The National Socialist Propaganda Directorate, which Goebbels oversaw, had at its disposal nearly all film agencies in Germany by 1936. Occasionally, certain directors such as Wolfgang Liebeneiner were able to bypass Goebbels by providing him with a different version of the film than would be released. Such films include those directed by Helmut Käutner: Romanze in Moll (Romance in a Minor Key, 1943), Große Freiheit Nr. 7 (The Great Freedom, No. 7, 1944), and Unter den Brücken (Under the Bridges, 1945).

Schools were also provided with motion picture projectors because the film was regarded as particularly appropriate for propagandising children. Films specifically created for schools were termed "military education."

Triumph des Willens (Triumph of the Will, 1935) by film-maker Leni Riefenstahl chronicled the Nazi Party Congress of 1934 in Nuremberg. It followed an earlier film of the 1933 Nuremberg Rally produced by Riefenstahl, Der Sieg des Glaubens. Triumph of the Will features footage of uniformed party members (though relatively few German soldiers), who are marching and drilling to militaristic tunes. The film contains excerpts from speeches given by various Nazi leaders at the Congress, including Hitler. Frank Capra used scenes from the film, which he described partially as "the ominous prelude of Hitler's holocaust of hate", in many parts of the United States government's Why We Fight anti-Axis seven-film series, to demonstrate what the personnel of the U.S. military would be facing in World War II, and why the Axis had to be defeated.

During 1940 three antisemitic films were shown: The Rothschilds, Jud Süß, and Der ewige Jude.

Der ewige Jude (The Eternal Jew, 1940) was directed by Fritz Hippler at the insistence of Goebbels, though the writing is credited to Eberhard Taubert. The movie is done in the style of a feature-length documentary, the central thesis being the immutable racial personality traits that characterise the Jew as a wandering cultural parasite. Throughout the film, these traits are contrasted to the Nazi state ideal: while Aryan men find satisfaction in physical labour and the creation of value, Jews only find pleasure in money and a hedonist lifestyle. The movie is resolved with Hitler giving a speech hinting at the coming "Final Solution", his plan to exterminate millions of Jews. One historian has noted that "so radical was the film's antisemitism that the Propaganda Ministry had doubts about showing it to the public... it was most successful amongst Party activists; the general public was less impressed".

The main medium was Die Deutsche Wochenschau, a newsreel series produced for cinemas, from 1940. Newsreels were explicitly intended to portray German interests as successful. Themes often included the virtues of the Nordic or Aryan type, German military and industrial strength, and the evils of Germany's enemies.

=== Fine art ===
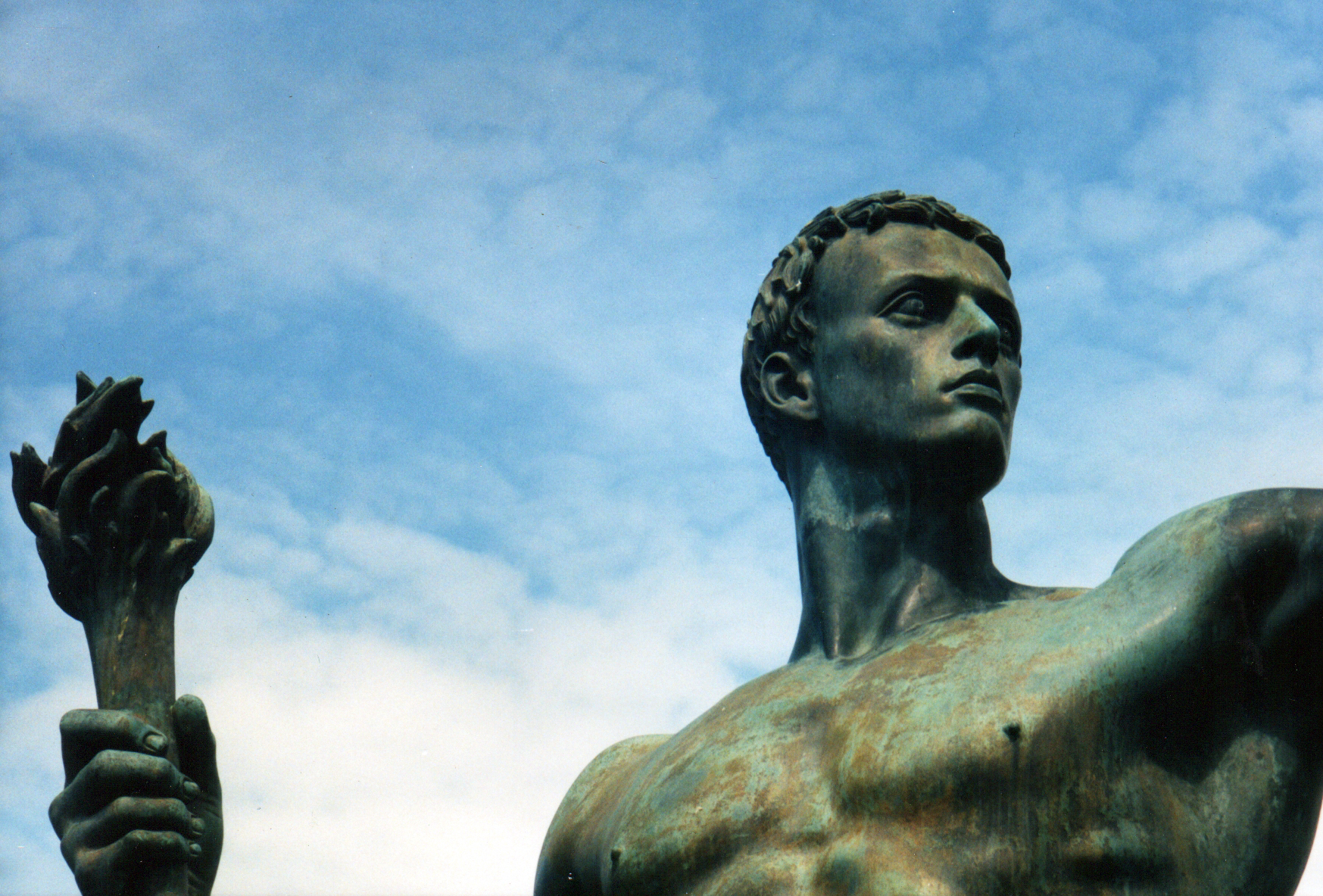
Arno Breker's sculptures of the Nordic-Aryan man made him Hitler's favourite sculptor.

By Nazi standards, fine art was not propaganda. Its purpose was to create ideals, for eternity. This produced a call for heroic and romantic art, which reflected the ideal rather than the realistic. Explicitly political paintings were very rare. Still more rare were antisemitic paintings, because the art was supposed to be on a higher plane. Nevertheless, selected themes, common in propaganda, were the most common topics of art.

Sculpture was used as an expression of Nazi racial theories. The most common image was of the nude male, expressing the ideal of the Aryan race. Nudes were required to be physically perfect. At the Paris Exposition of 1937, Josef Thorak's Comradeship stood outside the German pavilion, depicting two enormous nude males, clasping hands and standing defiantly side by side, in a pose of defense and racial camaraderie.

Landscape painting featured mostly heavily in the Greater German Art exhibition, in accordance with themes of blood and soil. Peasants were also popular images, reflecting a simple life in harmony with nature, frequently with large families. With the advent of war, war art came to be a significant though still not predominating proportion.

The continuing of the German Art Exhibition throughout the war was put forth as a manifestation of German's culture.

=== Magazines ===
In and after 1939, the Zeitschriften-Dienst was sent to magazines to provide guidelines on what to write for appropriate topics. Nazi publications also carried various forms of propaganda.

Neues Volk was a monthly publication of the Office of Racial Policy, which answered questions about acceptable race relations. While mainly focused on race relations, it also included articles about the strength and character of the Aryan race compared to Jews and other "defectives".

The NS-Frauen-Warte, aimed at women, included such topics as the role of women in the Nazi state. Despite its propaganda elements, it was predominantly a women's magazine. It defended anti-intellectualism, urged women to have children, even in wartime, put forth what the Nazis had done for women, discussed bridal schools, and urged women to greater efforts in total war.

Der Pimpf was aimed at boys, and contained both adventure and propaganda.

Das Deutsche Mädel, in contrast, recommended that girls take up hiking, tending the wounded, and preparing to care for children. Far more than NS-Frauen-Warte, it emphasised the strong and active German woman.

==== Signal ====
Signal was a propaganda magazine published by the Wehrmacht during World War II and distributed throughout occupied Europe and neutral countries. Published from April 1940 to March 1945, Signal had the highest sales of any magazine published in Europe during the period—circulation peaked at 2.5 million in 1943. At various times, it was published in at least twenty languages. An English edition was distributed in the British Channel Islands of Guernsey, Jersey, Alderney, and Sark, which were occupied by the Wehrmacht during the war.

The promoter of the magazine was the chief of the Wehrmacht propaganda office, Colonel Hasso von Wedel. Its annual budget was 10 million Reichsmarks, roughly $2.5 million at the pre-war exchange rate.

The image that Signal transmitted was that of Nazi Germany and its New Order as the great benefactor of European peoples and of Western civilisation in general. The danger of a Soviet invasion of Europe was strongly pointed out. The quality of the magazine itself was quite high, featuring complete reviews from the front lines rich in information and photos, even displaying a double center-page full-color picture. In fact, many of the most famous Second World War photos that are seen today come from Signal. The magazine contained little to no antisemitic propaganda, as the contents were mainly military.

=== Newspapers ===
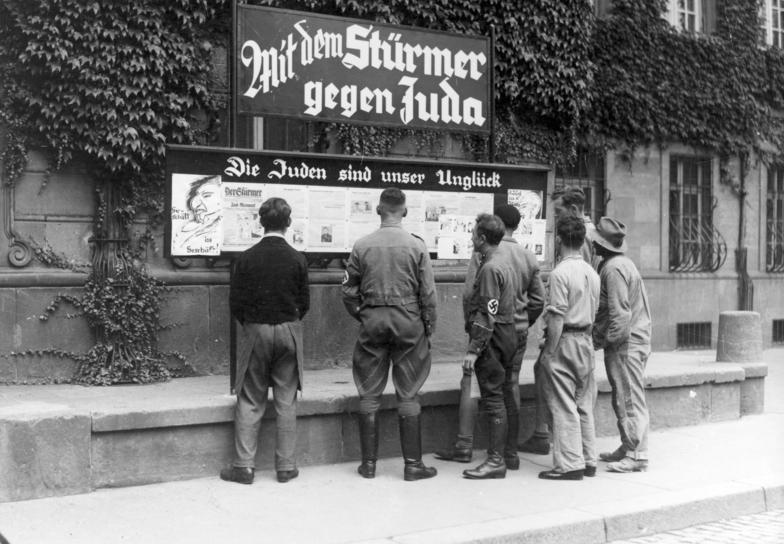
German citizens publicly reading pages of Der Stürmer in Worms, 1935. The billboard heading reads: "With the Stürmer against Judah". The subheading reads: "The Jews are our misfortune".

The Völkischer Beobachter ("People's Observer") was the official daily newspaper of the NSDAP since December 1920. It disseminated Nazi ideology in the form of brief hyperboles directed against the weakness of parliamentarism, the evils of Jewry and Bolshevism, the national humiliation of the Versailles Treaty, and other such topics. It was joined in 1926 by Der Angriff ("The Attack"), a weekly and later daily paper founded by Joseph Goebbels. It was mainly dedicated to attacks against political opponents and Jews—one of its most striking features were vehemently antisemitic cartoons by Hans Schweitzer—but also engaged in the glorification of Nazi heroes such as Horst Wessel. The Illustrierter Beobachter was their weekly illustrated paper.

Other Nazi publications included;

- Das Reich, a more moderate and highbrow publication aimed at intellectuals and foreigners;
- Der Stürmer, the most virulently antisemitic of all;
- Das Schwarze Korps, an SS publication, aiming at a more intellectual tone.

After Hitler's rise to power in 1933, all of the regular press came under complete Nazi editorial control through the policy of Gleichschaltung, and short-lived propaganda newspapers were also established in the conquered territories during World War II. Alfred Rosenberg was a key member of the Nazi Party who gained control of their newspaper which was openly praised by Hitler. However, Hitler was dissatisfied by Rosenberg's work and slandered Rosenberg behind his back, discrediting his work.

==== Newspapers in occupied countries ====
In Ukraine, after the Nazis cracked down on newspapers, most papers printed only articles from German agencies, producing the odd effect of more anti-American and anti-British articles than anti-Communist ones. They also printed articles about antecedents of German rule over Ukraine, such as Catherine the Great and the Goths.

In Norway during the 1930s the newspaper Aftenposten was supportive of Nazi Germany, and after Norway was occupied in 1940 the newspaper was used by the Germans to spread propaganda. The editor was replaced by a member of Vidkun Quisling's government.

=== Photography ===
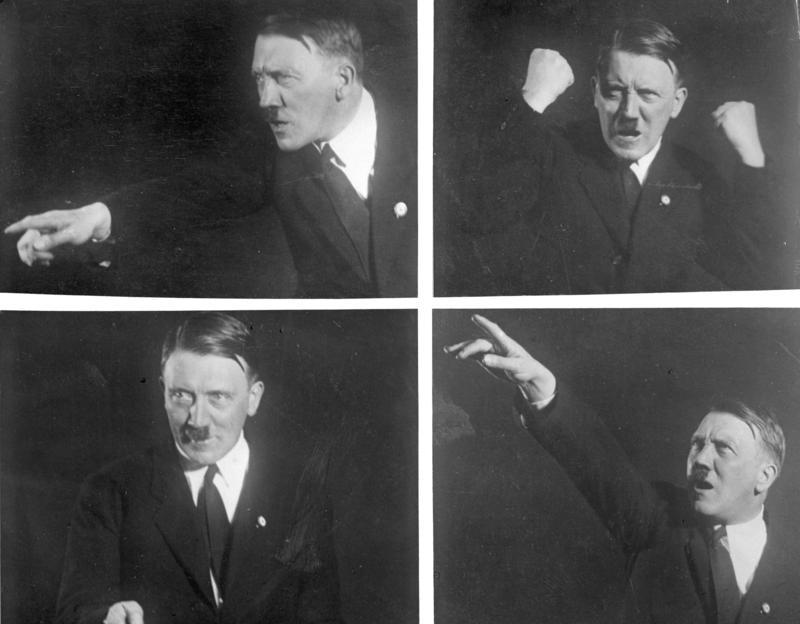
Adolf Hitler rehearsing poses for his speeches in photos reportedly taken in 1927

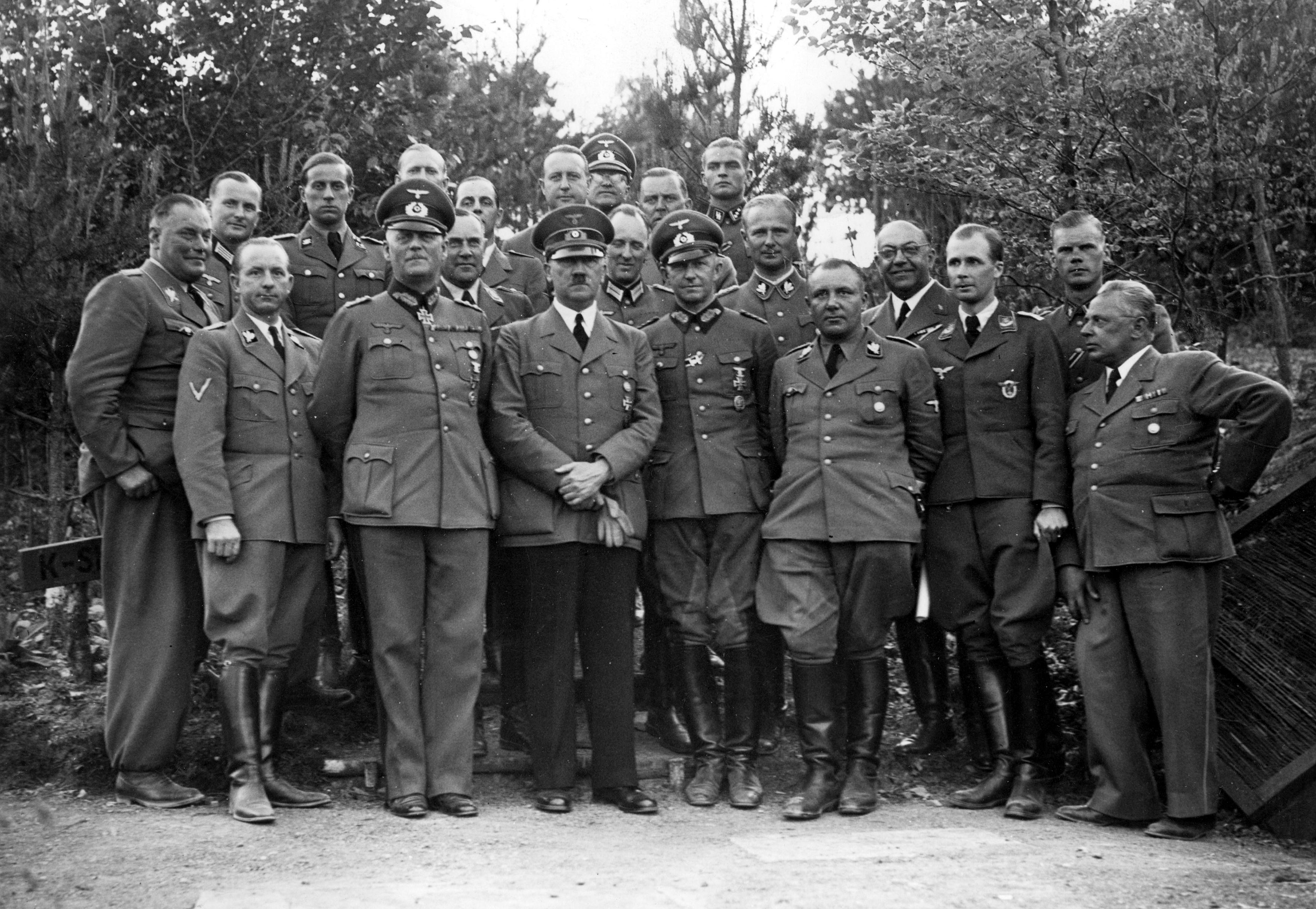
Hitler with his staff, May or June 1940, with Heinrich Hoffmann in the front row, far right

The Nazis used photographers to document events and promote ideology. Photographers included Heinrich Hoffmann and Hugo Jaeger. Hoffmann worked in his father's photographic shop and as a photographer in Munich from 1908. He joined the Nazi Party on 6 April 1920. After Hitler took over the party in 1921, he named Hoffmann as his official photographer, a post he held for over a quarter-century. A photograph taken by Hoffmann in Munich's Odeonsplatz on 2 August 1914 purports to show a young Hitler among the crowds cheering the outbreak of World War I; however, later historians such as Gerd Krumeich believe the photo to be doctored for use in Nazi propaganda. Hitler and Hoffmann became close friends—in fact, when Hitler became the ruler of Germany, Hoffmann was the only man authorized to take official photographs of him. Hoffmann's photographs were published as postage stamps, postcards, posters, and picture books. Following Hoffmann's suggestion, both he and Hitler received royalties from all uses of Hitler's image (even on postage stamps), which made Hoffmann a millionaire. In 1940 he was elected to the Reichstag.

Nine photographs taken by Hoffman reveal how Hitler rehearsed poses and his hand gestures. He asked Hoffmann to take pictures so that he could see how he looked while speaking. Hitler later asked that these photographs be destroyed, which Hoffman did not follow through with. Hoffman was forbidden from taking such candid photographs without Hitler's consent. This was an intentional propaganda effort to maintain the cult of personality around Adolf Hitler. Egon Hanfstaengl, son of Hitler's one-time foreign press officer Ernst "Putzi" Hanfstaengl, said in a documentary, Fatal Attraction of Hitler: "He had that ability which is needed to make people stop thinking critically and just emote."

=== Posters ===
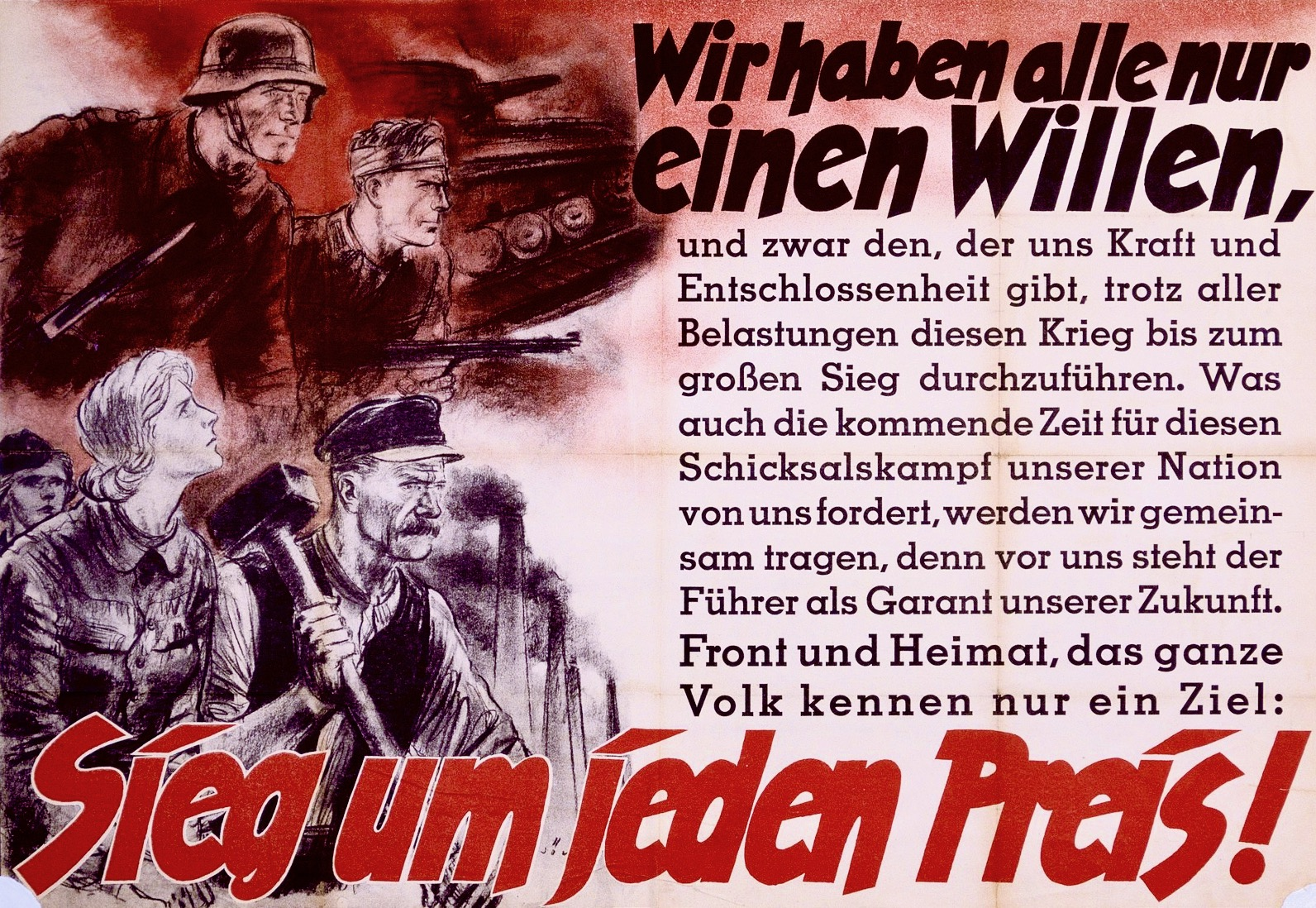
"We have only one goal... Victory at all costs!" — Parole der Woche 29 April 1942

Poster art was a mainstay of the Nazi propaganda effort, aimed both at Germany itself and occupied territories. It had several advantages. The visual effect, being striking, would reach the viewer easily. Posters were also, unlike other forms of propaganda, difficult to avoid.

Imagery frequently drew on heroic realism. Nazi youth and the SS were depicted monumentally, with lighting posed to produce grandeur. In a symbolic nod to the military exploits of the Teutonic Knights in medieval times, Nazi propaganda posters depicted German soldiers as knights in shining armor defending the German nation and Europe from the supposed threat of "Bolshevist Jewry".

Parole der Woche wall newspapers were published by the Reich Ministry of Public Enlightenment and Propaganda. The first edition was distributed on 16 March 1936. Every week an estimated 125,000 posters were administered to the public from 1936 to 1943. Word of the Week posters were politically skewed and meant to rally public opinion in support of the Nazi efforts. The posters set out to educate and unify the German people before and especially during World War II.

The posters were placed in train cars, buses, platforms, ticket windows—anywhere there was dense traffic flow. Very few individuals, at the time, owned a car; most biked, walked, or used public transportation daily. Exposure to the Word of the Week posters was high in German cities. The messages and Nazi ideologies "stared out at the mass public for a week at a time in tens of thousands of places German pedestrians were likely to pass in the course of a day".

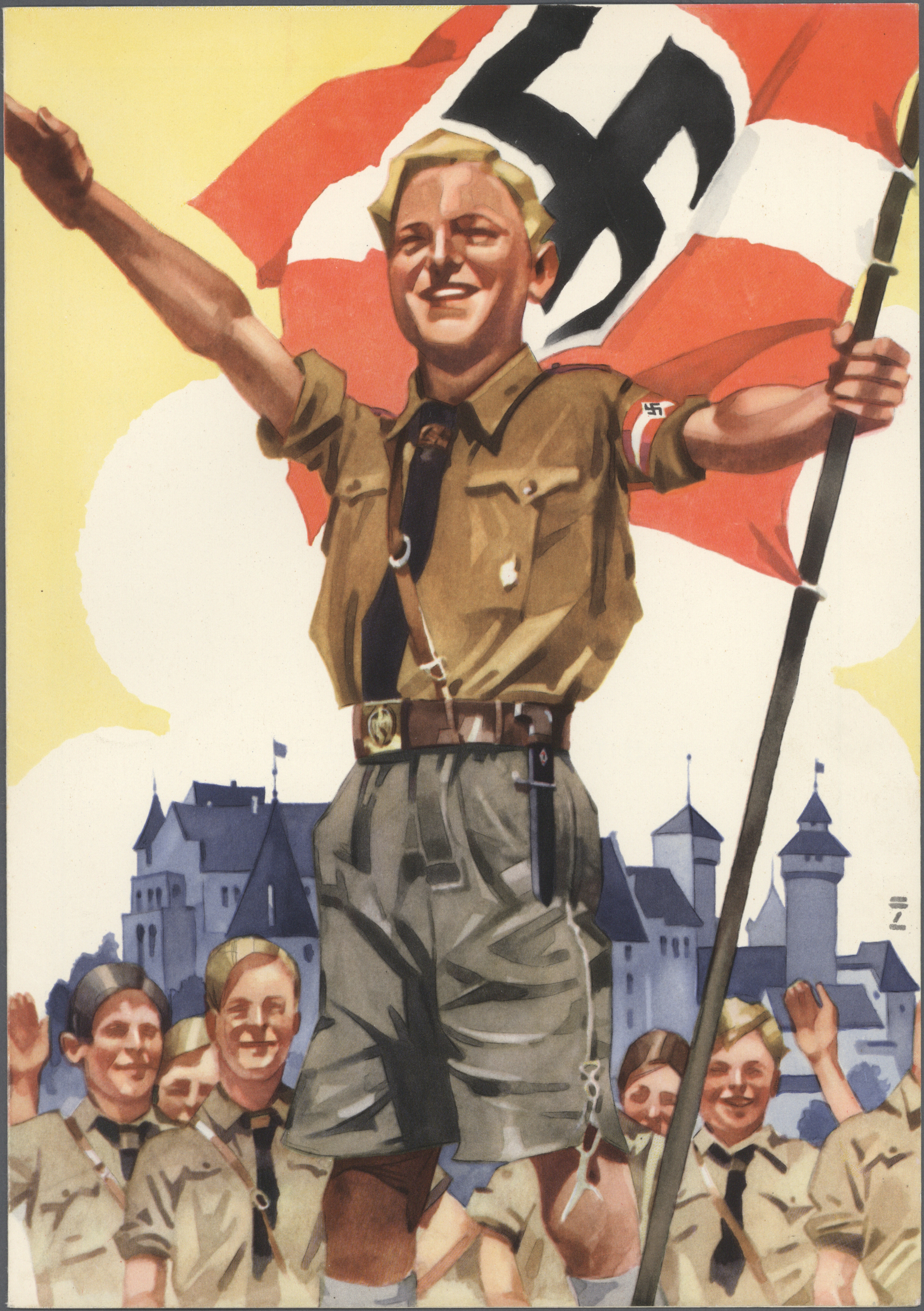
Hitler Youth propaganda

Jeffery Herf, author of The Jewish Enemy: Nazi Propaganda During World War II and the Holocaust, described the poster campaign as a "combination of a newspaper editorial, political leaflet, political poster, and tabloid journalism". Hitler personally appointed artist Hans Schweitzer, known as Mjölnir, with the task of translating Nazi ideology into images for the wall newspaper. The posters were 39.37 inches high and 83.46 inches wide. The visual style of the posters was bold text and Nazi-influenced colors; it was meant to capture the attention of the German passersby. The text was big so that several people could read it at the same time and from a distance of a few meters.

The majority of the posters were centred on Jews and the Allied countries of the United Kingdom, the United States, and the Soviet Union. During the time period when antisemitic articles decreased in publications, antisemitic rhetoric was ramped up in The Word of the Week posters. From 1941 to 1943 about twenty-five percent of The Word Of The Week posters included an attack on Jews. The Jews were depicted as enemies because of their supposed economic war, capitalism, and connection to the Bolshevik revolution in Russia. The Nazi regime fostered the idea that the Jews were the masterminds behind all oppositional political forces. Images often showed a Jewish figure positioned behind, or above, symbols of economic and political influence. Additionally, it was also common to depict the Allied forces of Britain, the U.S., and the USSR as overtaken by Jewry.

Posters were also used in schools, depicting, for instance, an institution for the feeble-minded on one hand and houses on the other, to inform the students that the annual cost of this institution would build 17 homes for healthy families.

=== Radio ===
Before Hitler came to power, he rarely used radio to connect with the public, and when he did so, non-party newspapers were allowed to publish his speeches. This changed soon after he came to power in 1933. Hitler's speeches became widely broadcast all over Germany, especially on the radio, itself introduced by the Ministry of Propaganda. They were shown in weekly newsreels and reprinted in large editions in books and pamphlets all across Germany. Hitler's speeches became so significant to the Nazis that even restaurants and pubs were expected to have their radios on whenever he was delivering one, and in some cities public speakers were used so passersby could hear them. The Nazis also sold cheap radios so that people could hear speeches at home. These were called the People's Receivers, and were sold for 76 marks, while cheaper versions were sold for 35 marks. Furthermore, the types of stations and wavelengths that could be accessed and reached by the radios were controlled by the Ministry, allowing them to limit the radios’ capabilities to listening in on government announcements and propaganda. Nazi propaganda emphasised and portrayed his speeches so that their main points appeared in weekly posters and were all over Germany by the hundreds of thousands.

Nazi propaganda also used radio as an important tool to promote genocide.

==== Internal broadcasts ====
Recognising the importance of radio in disseminating the Nazi message, Goebbels approved a scheme whereby millions of cheap radio sets (the Volksempfänger) were subsidised by the government. In the Der Rundfunk als achte Großmacht ("Radio as the Eighth Great Power") speech, Goebbels proclaimed:

It would not have been possible for us to take power or to use it in the ways we have without the radio....It is no exaggeration to say that the German revolution, at least in the form it took, would have been impossible without the aeroplane and the radio. ...[Radio] reached the entire nation, regardless of class, standing, or religion. That was primarily the result of the tight centralisation, the strong reporting, and the up-to-date nature of the German radio....Above all it is necessary to clearly centralise all radio activities, to place spiritual tasks ahead of technical ones,...to provide a clear worldview,

By the start of the Second World War, over 70% of German households had one of these radios, which were deliberately limited in range in order to prevent loyal citizens from considering other viewpoints in foreign broadcasts. Radio broadcasts were also played over loudspeakers in public places and workplaces.

In private homes, however, people could easily turn off the radio when bored and did so once the novelty of hearing the voice from a box wore off; this caused the Nazis to introduce many non-propaganda elements, such as music, advice and tips, serials and other entertainment. This was accelerated during the war to prevent people from tuning in enemy propaganda broadcasts; though Goebbels claimed in his Das Reich article that it was to make the radio a good companion to the people, he admitted the truth in his diary.

==== External broadcasts ====
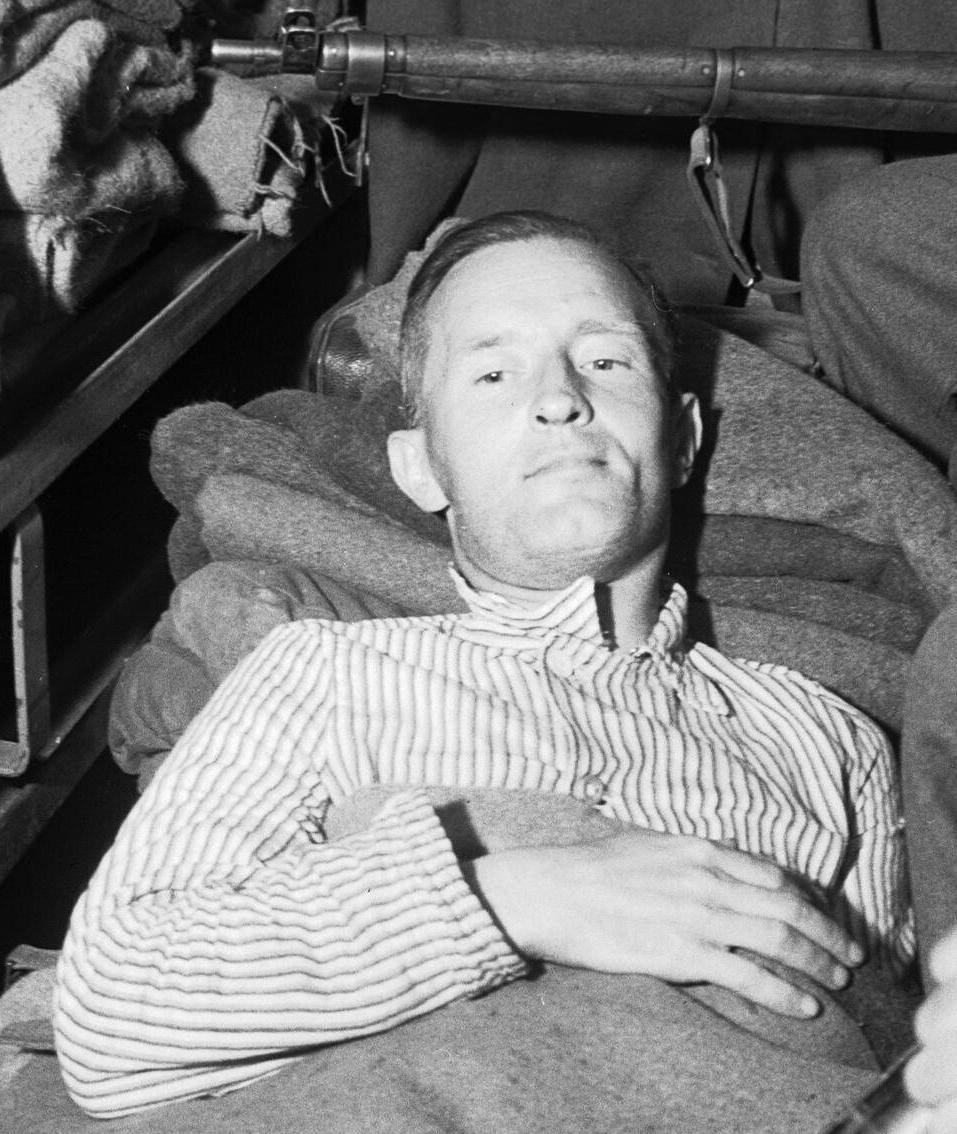
William Joyce, known as "Lord Haw-Haw" to British wartime listeners, lying in an ambulance under armed guard before being taken from British Second Army headquarters to a hospital following his arrest

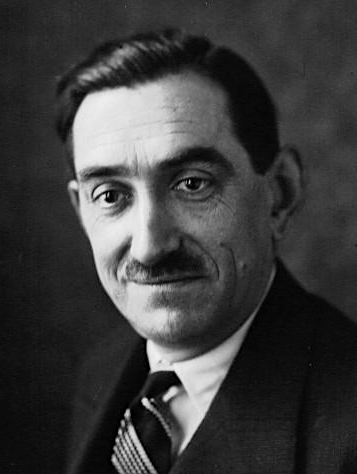
Philippe Henriot in 1934, who later became a Vichy minister and broadcaster for the Nazis

As well as domestic broadcasts, the Nazi regime used radio to deliver its message to both occupied territories and enemy states. One of the main targets was the United Kingdom, to which William Joyce broadcast regularly, gaining the nickname "Lord Haw-Haw". Joyce first appeared on German radio on 6 September 1939 reading the news in English but soon became noted for his often mischievous propaganda broadcasts. Joyce was executed for treason in 1946. Although Joyce was the most notorious, and most regularly heard, of British propagandists, other broadcasters included Norman Baillie-Stewart, Jersey-born teacher Pearl Vardon, British Union of Fascists members Leonard Banning and Susan Hilton, Barry Payne Jones of The Link and Alexander Fraser Grant, whose show was aimed specifically at Scotland, also broadcasting through the "New British Broadcasting Service".

Broadcasts were also made to the United States, notably by Robert Henry Best and 'Axis Sally' Mildred Gillars. Best, a freelance journalist based in Vienna, was initially arrested following the German declaration of war on the U.S. but soon became a feature on propaganda radio, attacking the influence of Jews in the U.S. and the leadership of Franklin D. Roosevelt, who succeeded Winston Churchill in Nazi propaganda as "World-Enemy Number One". Best was later sentenced to life imprisonment for treason, and died in prison in 1952. Gillars, a teacher in Germany, mostly broadcast on similar themes as well as peppering her speech with allegations of infidelity against the wives of servicemen. Her most notorious broadcast was the "Vision of Invasion" radio play, broadcast immediately prior to D-Day, from the perspective of an American mother who dreamed that her soldier son died violently in Normandy.

France also received broadcasts from Radio-Stuttgart, where Paul Ferdonnet, an antisemitic journalist, was the main voice during the Phoney War. Following the occupation, Radio Paris and Radio-Vichy became the main organs of propaganda, with leading far-right figures such as Jacques Doriot, Philippe Henriot, and Jean Hérold-Paquis regularly speaking in support of the Nazis. Others who broadcast included Gerald Hewitt, a British citizen who lived most of his life in Paris and had been associated with Action Française.

Domestic broadcasters were also used to galvanise support for occupation in Belgium, where Ward Hermans regularly spoke in support of the Nazis from his base in Bremen, and the Italian Social Republic, to where Giovanni Preziosi broadcast a vehemently antisemitic show from his base in Munich. Pro-Nazi radio broadcasts in the Arabic language aired in North Africa, crafted with the help of Mohammad Amin al-Husayni and other Arab exiles in Berlin to highlight Arab nationalism. They recast Nazi racist ideology to target Jews alone, not all Semites. Downplaying Mussolini's operations in Africa, they touted the anti-colonialism of the Axis Powers.

=== Speakers ===
The Nazi Party relied heavily on speakers to make its propaganda presentations, most heavily before they came to power, but also afterwards. In Mein Kampf, Hitler recounted that he had realised that it was not written matter but the spoken word that brought about changes, as people would not read things that they disagreed with, but would linger to hear a speaker. Furthermore, speakers, having their audiences before them, could see their reactions and adjust accordingly, to persuade. His own oratory was a major factor in his rise, and he despised those who came to read pre-written speeches.

Such speakers were particularly important when the information put across was not desired to reach foreigners, who could access the mass media. Schools were instituted to substitute for the political conflict that had formed the old speakers. In 1939, Walter Tiessler, speaking of his own experience as an early speaker, urged that they continue.

Sturmabteilung speakers were used, though their reliance on instinct sometimes offended well-educated audiences, but their blunt and folksy manner often had its own appeal.

The ministry would provide such speakers with information, such as how to spin the problems on the eastern front, or how to discuss the cuts in food rations. The party propaganda headquarters, sent the Redner-Schnellinformation (Speakers' Express Information) out with guidelines for immediate campaigns, such as antisemitic campaigns and what information to present.

Specific groups were targeted with such speakers. Speakers were created specifically, for instance, for Hitler Youth. These would, among other things, lecture Hitler Youth members and the BDM on the need to produce more children.

Speakers often addressed political or military rallies, which were well-orchestrated events with banners and marching bands.

== Historiography ==
Nazi propaganda is a relatively recent topic of close study. Historians of all persuasions, including Eastern Bloc writers, agree about its remarkable effectiveness. Their assessment of its significance, however—whether it shaped or merely directed and exploited public opinion—is influenced by their approach to wider questions raised by the study of Nazi Germany, such as the question of whether the Nazi state was a fully totalitarian dictatorship, as argued by Hannah Arendt, or whether it also depended on a certain societal consensus.

In addition to media archives, an important primary source for the study of the Nazi propaganda effort are the reports on civilian morale and public opinion that the Sicherheitsdienst and later the RMVP compiled from 1939 on. Another are the Deutschland-Berichte, reports gathered by underground agents of the Sopade that particularly dealt with German popular opinion.

== See also ==
- Amt Rosenberg
- Big lie
- Censorship in Germany
- Children's propaganda in Nazi Germany
- Hate media
- LTI – Lingua Tertii Imperii
- Myth of the clean Wehrmacht
- Nazi board games
- Stab-in-the-back myth
- Propaganda during World War II
  - American propaganda during World War II
  - British propaganda during World War II
  - Japanese propaganda during World War II
  - Propaganda in Fascist Italy
- Propaganda in the Soviet Union
- Rommel myth
- Themes in Nazi propaganda
- Wunderwaffe
- XGRS

== Bibliography ==
- Bytwerk, Randall (2005). "The Argument for Genocide in Nazi Propaganda". Quarterly Journal of Speech. 91 (1): 37–62. doi:10.1080/00335630500157516. S2CID 144116639.
- Herf, Jeffrey (2006). The Jewish Enemy: Nazi Ideology and Propaganda During World War II and the Holocaust. Harvard University Press. ISBN 978-0-674-02175-4.
- Kershaw, Ian (25 October 2001). Hitler 1889–1936: Hubris. Penguin Books Limited. ISBN 978-0-14-192579-0.
- Welch, David (1993). The Third Reich: Politics and Propaganda. Routledge. ISBN 978-0-203-93014-4.
