= Nazi board games =

Board games created by Nazi Germany as propaganda

Nazi board games were an element of Adolf Hitler’s propaganda campaign within Nazi Germany. Hitler’s Propaganda Minister, Joseph Goebbels, understood that "To be perceived, propaganda must evoke the interest of an audience and must be transmitted through an attention-getting communications medium". Board games and toys for children served as a way to spread racial, military, and political propaganda to German youth.

== Examples ==
=== Juden Raus! (1936) ===
Juden Raus! (lit. "Jews Out!") is a cross and circle-style game published in Germany by Günther & Co. in 1936. The game was advertised as "entertaining, instructive and solidly constructed". The game's equipment includes a pair of dice, a game board, and several game piece figurines with large pointed hats meant to represent Jews.

Players take turns rolling the dice and moving their "Jews" across the map toward "collection points" outside the city walls for deportation to Mandatory Palestine. Written on the game board, it says "If you manage to send off six Jews, you’ve won a clear victory!"

Juden Raus is a commercial boardgame rather than a Nazi propaganda effort, and contains no Nazi symbolism. The game was criticised by the SS journal Das Schwarze Korps, which believed the game trivialised antisemitic policies. Ben Barkow of the Holocaust museum at the Wiener Library recounts it being documented as a "considerable commercial success", with possibly a million copies of it being sold. However, an article in the Board Game Studies Journal suggests that the game's commercial performance may never actually be known because it may have been exaggerated in advertising material. The article considers it unlikely that the game could have been successful in Germany after having been condemned by the SS. Three copies of the game are known to exist and a smaller "travel version" of the game recently sold at auction (Kedeem auction house) in 2024 for $18750.00. The article published by the International Board Game Studies Association calls it "history's most infamous board game". The review says, "Juden Raus! shows that after decades of propaganda, antisemitism was so deeply rooted in German society in the 1930s, that someone thought it would be a good subject for a children’s game. Racism is present in many board games, but Juden Raus! is unique in its portrayal of how racism manifests itself in society and is a terrifying example of the banality of evil. ... Juden Raus! is a warning to us all".

=== Bomber über England (1940) ===
Bomber über England (lit. "Bombers over England") is a bagatelle (or pinball) style game featuring a map of Great Britain and part of Northern Europe. The map contains holes in the location of key cities such as London, Liverpool, Newcastle and Plymouth; naval bases at Scapa Flow and Shetland; as well as British ships and lighthouses in the North Sea.

Players shoot spring-driven balls representing "bombs" at these targets and are awarded various points for hitting the enemy targets. If players bomb locations under the control of Nazi Germany such as Brussels and Amsterdam, they lose points.

=== Jagd auf Kohlenklau (1944) ===
Jagd auf Kohlenklau (lit. "Hunting for the Coal Thief") is a roll-and-move board game which was produced by Lepthian-Schiffers in Nazi Germany during the latter years of World War II. The game was part of a Nazi propaganda campaign that was launched on June 23, 1942, under the slogan "Kampf dem Kohlenklau" or "fight the coal thief". This campaign sought to promote energy conservation as a means to save the country's dwindling resources for the war effort. The visual representation of the Kohlenklau, or "coal thief," became an iconic image of Nazi Germany and was often featured in newspapers, magazines, posters, and films. Four million copies of Jagd auf Kohlenklau were produced and distributed among the households with the most children.

The game board consists of 50 spaces, red, black and white. The players roll a die and advance their game piece that many spaces. When the player lands on a space, they read aloud a corresponding text passage from the board. Red spaces represent energy wasting actions that penalise players, e.g. "...leaves the radio on when nobody is listening. The coal thief likes that! (miss a turn)". Black spaces feature actions that conserve energy and reward the players. White spaces are neutral and have no effect. Players take turns until one finally reaches the end and is declared the winner. The winner discovers who the "coal thief" was and successfully evicts them from the house.
