= Sonya Michel =

American historian

Sonya Michel is an American historian. She is Professor Emerita at the Department History, University of Maryland. She has also taught at Brandeis University, Brown University, Harvard University, Princeton University, University of Illinois at Chicago, and the University of Illinois Urbana-Champaign. Michel served as Director of United States Studies at the Woodrow Wilson International Center for Scholars.

== Career ==
=== In academia ===
Sonya Michel earned her Ph.D. in American civilization from Brown University. Her research interests include care work and old-age security, child care, immigration and civil society, race and gender issues, as well as work-family balance. Sonya Michel was a founding editor of the academic journal Social Politics: International Studies in Gender, State and Society. Reflecting on the wide-ranging influence of Michel's career in 2015, the feminist scholar Eileen Boris writes that:

Since the 1970s, Sonya Michel has produced historical studies that enhance public debate. Even as she pioneered a precise use of maternalism, she anticipated the placing of care work at the center of the study of welfare states. Through collaboration and inclusion, by crossing academic and geographic borders, and linking past and present, she has modeled what collective research and social engagement looks like.

Sonya Michel's appearances on C-SPAN have included topics such as "Women and Labor Rights" and "Retirement and Social Security".

=== In art ===
Since retiring from the University of Maryland in 2016, Michel has become a working artist, specializing in mixed-media collage and assemblage works composed primarily of recycled and found materials. She was a member of the Touchstone Gallery in Washington, DC from 2021–23 and has exhibited frequently in juried exhibits at the Maryland Federation for the Arts Circle Gallery in Annapolis, Maryland. In the spring of 2024, she is co-curating the exhibit Paeans to Paper at the Sandy Spring Museum in Olney, Maryland.

== Personal life ==
Sonya Michel is married to Jeffrey Herf, who is also an American historian and professor at the University of Maryland.

== Selected works ==
- Civil Society, Public Space and Gender Justice: Historical and Comparative Perspectives, co-edited with Gunilla Budde and Karen Hagemann
- Children's Interests / Mothers' Rights:The Shaping of America's Child Care Policy
- Engendering America: A Documentary History, compiled with Robyn Muncy
- The Jewish Woman in America, with Charlotte Baum and Paula Hyman
- 2014, Gender and the Long Postwar: Reconsiderations of the United States and the Two Germanys, co-edited with Karen Hagemann
- 2011, Women, Migration, and the Work of Care: The United States in Comparative Perspective
- 2002, Child Care Policy at the Crossroads: Gender and Welfare State Restructuring, co-edited
- 1993, Mothers of a New World: Maternalist Politics and the Origins of Welfare States
- 1987, Behind the Lines: Gender and the Two World Wars
