= Hans Schweitzer =

German propaganda artist (1901–1980)

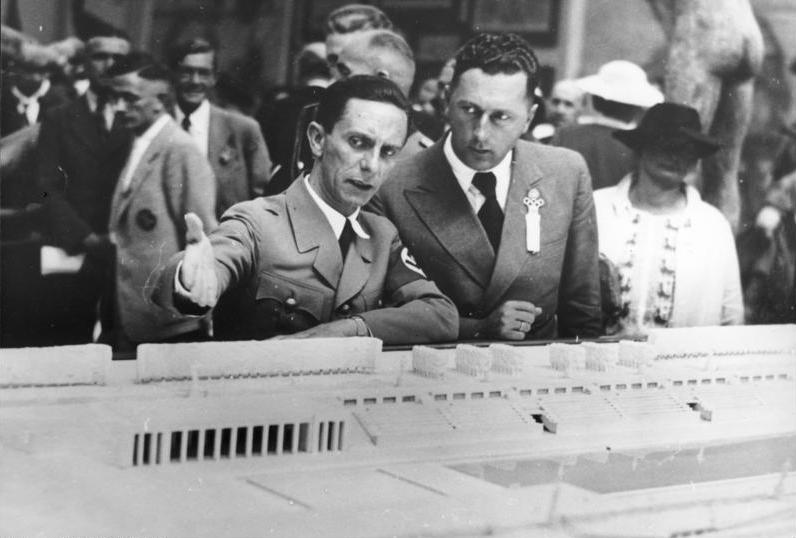
Joseph Goebbels and Hans Schweitzer at the opening of the Olympic art exhibition in 1936.

Hans Herbert Schweitzer (25 July 1901 – 15 September 1980), known as Mjölnir, or Mjoelnir was an artist who produced many posters for the Nazi Party (NSDAP) under Adolf Hitler. In Teutonic mythology, Mjölnir is the name of Thor's hammer.

He was recruited to produce Nazi propaganda posters by Joseph Goebbels. The posters depicted crude but memorable caricatures of the NSDAP's opponents. A recurring image was of a Sturmabteilung (SA) member side by side with a Heer soldier. Schweitzer was named a professor in 1937, and was named "Reich Commissioner for Artistic Design" and chairman of the Reich Committee of Press Illustrators.

He was a member of Adolf Ziegler’s five-man committee, which in early July 1937 selected approximately 1,100 artworks from 30 museums to be sent to Munich for the "Degenerate Art" exhibition.

After the war, Schweitzer remained in the western occupation zone. In the course of denazification, Schweitzer was fined 500 Deutschemarks in Hamburg-Bergedorf. He was boycotted as "Goebbels' illustrator", but nonetheless found work designing posters for West German federal press and information office and as an illustrator in the far-right press. In East Germany, some of his earlier work was discarded from library collections.
