= Jeffrey Herf =

American historian (born 1947)

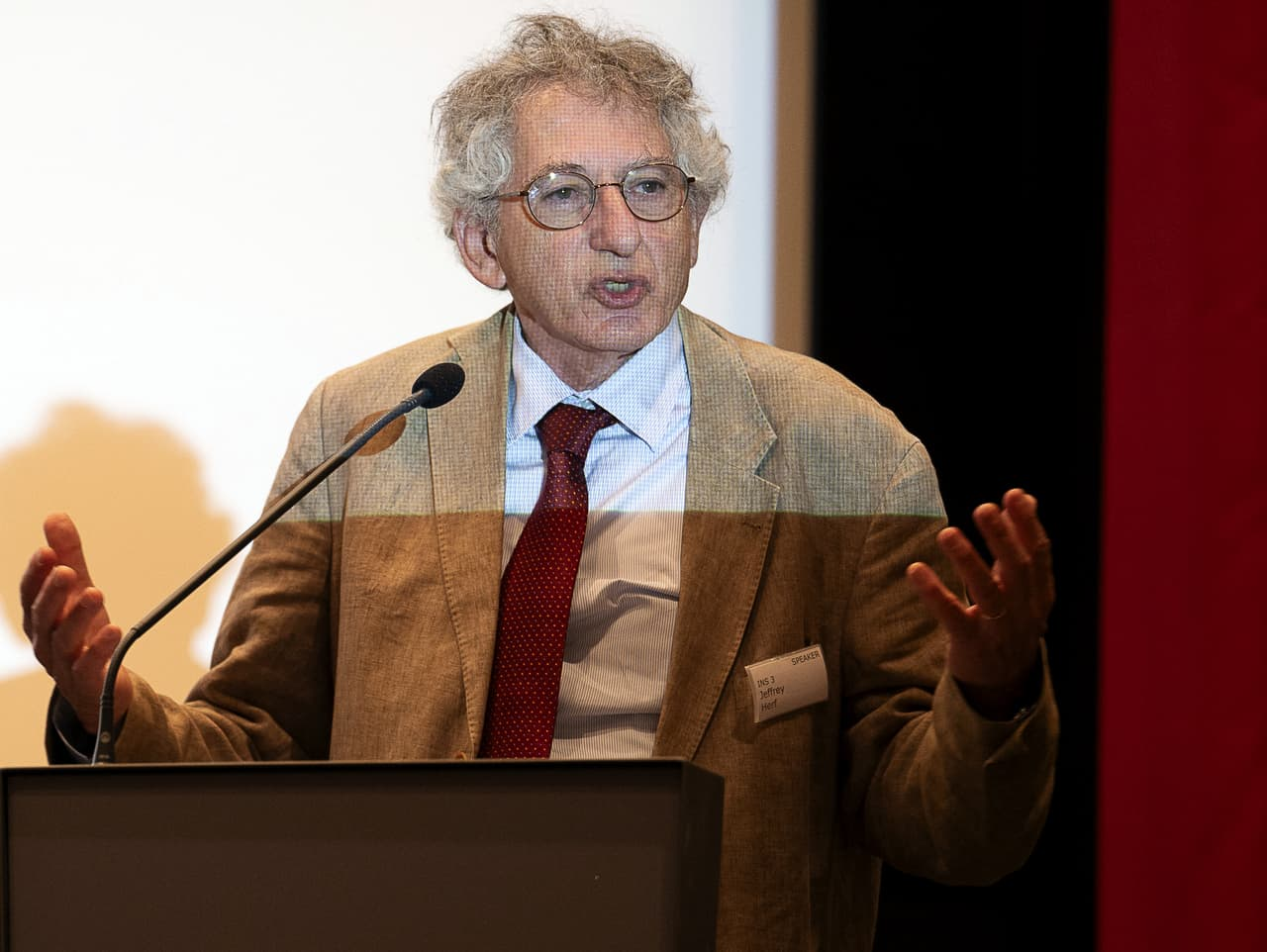
- Born: Jeffrey C. Herf; April 24, 1947 (age 79); Milwaukee, Wisconsin, U.S.
- Education: University of Wisconsin–Madison; Brandeis University (PhD)
- Occupation: Historian
- Spouse: Sonya Michel
- Awards: George Louis Beer Prize (1998)

Jeffrey C. Herf (born April 24, 1947) is an American historian of modern Europe, particularly modern Germany. He is professor emeritus of modern European history at the University of Maryland, College Park.

== Biography ==
He was born and raised in Milwaukee, Wisconsin. Herf's father escaped from Nazi Germany in 1937 and emigrated to the United States. His mother's parents left Ukraine and came to the United States before World War I. He grew up in a Reform Jewish family in Milwaukee, Wisconsin.

Herf graduated in history from the University of Wisconsin–Madison in 1969 and received his PhD in sociology from Brandeis University in 1981. Before joining the faculty at the University of Maryland, he taught at Harvard University, Ohio University, and Emory University.

In his 1984 book, Reactionary Modernism: Technology, Culture and Politics in Weimar and the Third Reich, drawing on critical theory, in particular ideology critique, Herf coined the term "reactionary modernism" to describe the mixture of robust modernity and an affirmative stance toward progress combined with dreams of the past, a highly technological romanticism, which was a current in Weimar's "conservative revolution" and in the Nazi Party and regime.

His subsequent books examine the political culture of West Germany before and during the battle over Euromissiles in the 1980s; memory and politics regarding the Holocaust in East and West Germany; Nazi Germany's domestic antisemitic propaganda; Nazi propaganda aimed at North Africa and the Middle East; the history of antagonism to Israel by the East German regime and West German leftist organizations from the Six Day War in 1967 to the Revolutions of 1989; the collapse of the European Communist states and the German reunification in 1990; and international support for and opposition to establishing the state of Israel, 1945–1949.

Herf has had a variety of fellowships including at Harvard University, the University of Chicago, the Institute for Advanced Study in Princeton, the German Historical Institute in Washington, the Yitzhak Rabin Center for Israel Studies in Tel Aviv, the Woodrow Wilson International Center for Scholars in Washington, D.C., and at the American Academy in Berlin in 2007.

He reviews and his essays on contemporary history and politics have been published in American Interest, American Purpose, Commentary, Fathom Journal, Frankfurter Allgemeine Zeitung, Israel Journal of Foreign Affairs, History News Network, The Jewish Review of Books, The New Republic, Partisan Review, Quillette, The Washington Post, Die Welt, and Die Zeit.

Herf has been one of the most outspoken critics of fellow historian Omer Bartov and in an article in The Israel Journal of Foreign Affairs wrote that the Israeli-American scholar was guilty of “prestige transfer… an old and sorry phenomenon in modern intellectual history, whereby persons who have displayed achievements in one area claim that, for example, ‘as a historian’ (and in this case a historian of the Holocaust), they have insight into ongoing events unavailable to others." He went on to write that Bartov's 2026 book, Israel: Where Did It Go Wrong, "is likely to contribute to the ongoing effort to make hatred of Israel respectable in the faculty lounge, the editorial office, the think tank, and in many political parties. I hope… that more discerning readers will ponder the question ‘What went wrong with Omer Bartov?’ The book does not represent the standards expected from professional historians nor from what we should expect from a distinguished publisher such as Farrar, Straus, and Giroux. Nevertheless, initial responses indicate that it may be a successful polemic and a commercial success... it will not be the first time that a very bad book has an outsized impact on public and published opinion."

He is married to the historian and artist Sonya Michel.

== Reception and critical assessment ==
Middle East historian, Joel Beinin, questions the conclusions of Jeffrey Herf – particularly regarding claims in Nazi Propaganda in the Arab World – regarding the reach of Axis messaging, pointing out that few shortwave radios in North Africa and the Levant, were mostly owned by Jews or Allied troops. For example, Herf argues that Sayyid Qutb, an Islamist who is commonly attributed to be an inspiration for radical Islam, could have been radicalized by listening to Nazi propaganda during this time in Egypt during the war. Beinin states that evidence for Qutb's antisemitism and increasing radicalism does not exist until – at earliest – 1948, and the beginning of the Arab-Israeli conflict; therefore, Beinin described Herf's attempts to link wartime Nazi propaganda directly to the subsequent radicalization of Sayyid Qutb as pure conjecture.

Politician scientist Gilbert Achcar argued that Herf's scholarship displays an "ignorance of Middle East and Islamic issues," which results in a selective narrative that overlooks the region's prominent historical anti-fascist, liberal, and leftist political movements.

Furthermore, historian David Motadel challenged the framework by arguing that Nazi Germany's mobilization of Islamic populations was driven by opportunistic military strategy and "strategic pragmatism" rather than a shared ideological romance.

Middle East historian Peter Wien criticized Jeffrey Herf's methodology, arguing that Herf relies entirely on Western archival sources while ignoring Arabic-language documents, which leads to an overstatement of the ideological alignment between Nazism and mid-20th-century Arab political movements. He points out that Herf who is involved with modern European history lacks the specialized training and Arabic-language familiarity needed to properly contextualize Middle Eastern political history. This leads Herf to rely heavily on Western intelligence and U.S. National Archives translations

Similarly, historian Israel Gershoni contended that Herf's framework belongs to an early 2000s post-9/11 wave of scholarship focused on "Islamofascism", constructing it as a direct, monolithic legacy of European fascism, which oversimplifies the actual historical record, and ultimately does a disservice to objective historiography by reading modern radical jihadism backward into World War II history.

== Awards and honors ==
- 1996 Charles Frankel Prize (co-winner) of the Wiener Library and Institute of Contemporary History, Divided Memory
- 1998 George Louis Beer Prize, Divided Memory
- 2006 National Jewish Book Award, The Jewish Enemy
- 2010 Washington Institute for Near East Policy, Bronze Prize for Nazi Propaganda for the Arab World
- 2011 Sybil Halpern Prize, German Studies Association for Nazi Propaganda for the Arab World
- 2014 Appointed Distinguished University Professor, University of Maryland, College Park
- 2022 Bernard Lewis Prize, Association for the Study of the Middle East and Africa for "Israel's Moment: International Support for and Opposition to Establishing the Jewish State, 1945-1949"

== Published works ==
- Reactionary Modernism: Technology, Culture and Politics in Weimar and the Third Reich
  - French edition, Le Modernisme Réactionaire: Haine de la Raison et Culte de la Technologie aux Sources du Nazisme, trans. Frederic Joly, Paris: Editions L’Echappée, 2018
  - Greek edition, University of Crete Press, 1994
  - Italian edition, Il modernismo reazionario: Tecnologia, cultura e politica nella Germania di Weimar e del Terzo Reich, Bologna: Il Mulino, 1988
  - Spanish edition, El Modernismo Reaccionario: Tecnologia, cultura y politica en Weimar y el Tercer Reich, Mexico City: Fondo de Cultura Economica, 1990
  - Japanese edition, Iwanami Shoton, Tokyo, 1991
  - Greek edition, 1996
  - Portuguese edition, O Modernismo Reacionario: Tecnoligia, Cultura e Politica na Republica de Weimar e No 3 Reich, São Paulo: Editora ensaio, 1993.
- War By Other Means: Soviet Power, West German Resistance and the Battle of the Euromissiles, The Free Press, 1991.
- Divided Memory: The Nazi Past in the Two Germanys, Harvard University Press, 1997
  - German edition: Zweierlei Erinnerugn: Die NS Vergangenheit im geteilten Deutschland, Berlin: Propylaen Verlag, 1998
- The Jewish Enemy: Nazi Propaganda During World War II and the Holocaust, Harvard University Press, 2006
- Nazi Propaganda for the Arab World, Yale University Press, 2009
- Undeclared Wars with Israel: East Germany and the West German Far Left, 1967–1989, Cambridge University Press, 2016
  - German edition: Unerklärte Kriege gegen Israel: Die DDR und die westdeutsche radikale Linke, 1967-1989, Göttingen: Wallstein Verlag, 2019
- Israel's Moment: International Support for and Opposition to Establishing the Jewish State, Cambridge University Press, 2022
- Three Faces of Antisemitism: Right, Left, and Islamist, Routledge, 2023

=== As Editor ===
- Anthony McElligott and Jeffrey Herf, eds. (2017), Antisemitism Before and Since the Holocaust: Altered Contexts and Recent Perspectives, London: Palgrave Macmillan
- Jeffrey Herf, ed. (2007), Antisemitism and Anti-Zionism in Historical Perspectives: Convergence and Divergence, New York: Routledge

=== Translations ===
- Alfred Schmidt (1981), History and structure: an essay on Hegelian-Marxist and structuralist theories of history. Cambridge, Massachusetts: MIT Press, ISBN 0-262-19198-9

=== Articles ===
- "The Nazi Roots of Islamist Hate". Tablet Magazine. July 6, 2022.
- "What is Old and What is New about the Terrorism of Islamic Fundamentalism". Partisan Review, No. 69, Winter 2002

== Sources ==
- Achcar, Gilbert (November 1, 2010). "Arabs and the Holocaust: A Response". The New Republic.
- Beinin, Joel (November 2010). "Review: Nazi Propaganda for the Arab World by Jeffrey Herf". International Journal of Middle East Studies. 42 (4). Cambridge University Press: 689–692. doi:10.1017/S0020743810000942A. ISSN 0020-7438. JSTOR 41308720.
- Gershoni, Israel (2011). "The 'Islamofascism' Debate and the Historiography of the Modern Middle East". Zmanim: A Historical Quarterly. 114. Tel Aviv University: 6–15.
- Motadel, David (2016). "Nazi Germany and Islam in Europe, North Africa, and the Middle East" (PDF). Central European History. 49 (1). Cambridge University Press: 1–25.
- Wien, Peter (2012). "Arabs and Fascism: Empirical and Theoretical Perspectives". Die Welt des Islams. 52 (3/4). Brill: 331–350. doi:10.1163/1570060X-20120A03.
