= The Jewish Enemy =

2006 book by Jeffrey Herf

The Jewish Enemy: Nazi Propaganda During World War II and the Holocaust
- Cover of the first edition
- Author: Jeffrey Herf
- Language: English
- Subject: Nazi Germany
- Published: 2006
- Publication place: United States
- Media type: Print
- Pages: 400
- ISBN: 978-0674027381

The Jewish Enemy: Nazi Propaganda During World War II and the Holocaust is a 2006 book by University of Maryland professor Jeffrey Herf, in which the author postulates that the Nazi government maintained its hold on the German people by controlling the press and claiming that Germans were already being attacked by an international Jewish conspiracy. Herf offers in the book a thorough study of the propaganda material disseminated by the National Socialist regime.

== Awards ==
- 2006: National Jewish Book Award in the Holocaust category

== Sources ==
- Herf, Jeffrey (2006). The Jewish Enemy: Nazi Propaganda during the World War II and the Holocaust. Cambridge, Massachusetts: Harvard University Press. ISBN 978-0-674038-59-2.
- Kershaw, Ian (2008). Hitler, The Germans, and The Final Solution. New Haven, Connecticut: Yale University Press. ISBN 978-0-300124-27-9.
