= Wilhelm Helfer =

German Nazi SA general (1886–1954)

Reichszeugmeister, Reichszeugmeisterei
- In office 1 May 1941 – 8 May 1945
- Preceded by: Richard Büchner
- Succeeded by: Position abolished

Führer, SA-Gruppe Hochland
- In office 10 July 1934 – 30 April 1941
- Preceded by: Wilhelm Schmid
- Succeeded by: Max Köglmaier

Führer, SA-Gruppe Hochland
- In office 15 March 1933 – 15 September 1933
- Preceded by: Johann Baptist Fuchs
- Succeeded by: Wilhelm Schmid

Additional positions
- 1933: Landtag of Bavaria Deputy
- 1933–1945: Reichstag Deputy

Personal details
- Born: 26 December 1886 Kaiserslautern, Rhenish Palatinate; Kingdom of Bavaria, German Empire
- Died: 15 August 1954 (aged 67) Laufen, Bavaria, West Germany
- Party: Nazi Party
- Other political affiliations: Deutschvölkischer Schutz- und Trutzbund
- Profession: Mining official
- Civilian awards: Blood Order; Brunswick Rally Badge; Golden Party Badge

Military service
- Allegiance: German Empire
- Branch/service: Royal Bavarian Army; Imperial Schutztruppe for German South West Africa
- Years of service: 1908–1910; 1914–1918
- Rank: Unteroffizier
- Unit: Royal Bavarian Life Guards
- Battles/wars: World War I
- Military awards: Iron Cross, 2nd class

Wilhelm Helfer (26 December 1886 – 15 August 1954) was a German member of the Sturmabteilung (SA), the Nazi Party's paramilitary organization, who became an SA-Obergruppenführer. For many years, he served as the commander of the SA-Gruppe Hochland in the Party's stronghold in Bavaria, and then led the Party's Reich Quartermaster Office during the Second World War. He was also a Nazi Party politician who served in the Landtag of Bavaria and the Reichstag.

== Early life ==
Helfer was born the son of a lawyer in Kaiserslautern. After attending Volksschule and Realschule, he completed a commercial apprenticeship in spinning and weaving from 1904 to 1907. He next attended a textile technical school in Reutlingen for a year. From 1908 to 1910, he performed military service with the Royal Bavarian Life Guards Regiment in Munich. For the next two years, Helfer worked as a commercial cashier. Emigrating from Germany to the colony of German South West Africa in 1912, he worked as a mining official and paymaster at a diamond mining company in Lüderitz. Upon the outbreak of the First World War in August 1914, Helfer became an Unteroffizier of the Imperial Schutztruppe for German South West Africa. He served in an artillery battery in Narubis, and earned the Iron Cross, 2nd class. He was captured in July 1915 and held as a prisoner of war by the British in the Transvaal until the end of the war in 1918. He resumed his career with a diamond mining company in Cape Town until returning to Germany in 1922.

== Career in the SA and the Nazi Party ==
Helfer joined the Deutschvölkischer Schutz- und Trutzbund, the largest and most active antisemitic Völkisch organization in the Weimar Republic. In June 1922, he became a member of the Nazi Party and its paramilitary unit, the Sturmabteilung (SA). As a very early Party member (membership number 305) he would later be awarded the Golden Party Badge. In April 1923, he became a Zugführer (platoon leader) and deputy Kompanieführer in the SA-Regiment München, advancing to Kompanieführer in September. With his company, Helfer participated in Adolf Hitler's failed Beer Hall Putsch on 9 November 1923 in Munich, for which he would later be awarded the Blood Order. After the Party was banned in the wake of the failed coup, he joined a Munich war veterans association, the Frontkriegerbund, became its Gauführer (regional leader) in Upper Bavaria and a member of its Bundesleitung (national leadership).

Helfer rejoined the Nazi Party on 28 March 1925, only a month after the ban on it was lifted. In April 1929, he was named the SA-Brigadeführer of SA-Brigade I in Munich, the Party's stronghold. He became the SA-Gausturmführer in February 1931, commanding all the SA units in Gau Munich-Upper Bavaria. He took part in the mass rally in Braunschweig with Hitler on 17–18 October 1931, for which he would be awarded the Brunswick Rally Badge. On 1 July 1932, he assumed command of SA-Untergruppe Munich-Upper Bavaria. After the Nazi seizure of power, Helfer was promoted to SA-Gruppenführer on 1 March 1933. He was appointed to the Landtag of Bavaria on 5 March and served until its dissolution by the Nazis on 14 October. On 12 March 1933, he was named the Sonderkommissar (Special Commissioner) of the Supreme SA Leadership to the regional government of Upper Bavaria. On 15 March, his command in Munich-Upper Bavaria was enlarged and renamed SA-Gruppe Hochland. On 15 September 1933, Helfer left his field command for an assignment to the staff of the Supreme SA Leadership. On 20 November 1933, he was named as the SA garrison commander for Munich. Also in November, Helfer was elected as a member of the Reichstag from electoral constituency 24 (Upper Bavaria-Swabia), where he served until the fall of the Nazi regime in May 1945.

Following Hitler's violent purge of the SA at the end of June 1934 known as the Night of the Long Knives, Helfer was reinstated in the key post of Führer of SA-Gruppe Hochland on 10 July 1934, after the unit's commander, SA-Gruppenführer Wilhelm Schmid, had been purged and executed. Helfer was promoted to the rank of SA-Obergruppenführer on 9 November 1937. He remained as the SA commander in Munich and Upper Bavaria until 1 May 1941 when he was appointed as the successor to the late Richard Büchner as Reichszeugmeister (Reich Quartermaster), and leader of Hauptamt (Main Office) VIII in the office of Franz Xaver Schwarz, the Reich Treasurer of the Nazi Party. In this position, he was responsible for the procurement of uniforms and equipment. In September 1942, he also was charged with implementation of air raid protection measures for the Nazi Party building complex in Munich. He remained at this post through Germany's surrender in the Second World War.

Little is documented of his post-war life, and he died in Laufen in August 1954.

=== SA ranks ===
SA ranks
Date	Rank
9 September 1923	SA-Kompanieführer
10 July 1927	SA-Brigadeführer
1 July 1932	SA-Oberführer
1 March 1933	SA-Gruppenführer
9 November 1937	SA-Obergruppenführer
