= Blood Order =

Nazi party award

Decoration in Memory of 9 November 1923 Medaille zur Erinnerung an den 9. November 1923
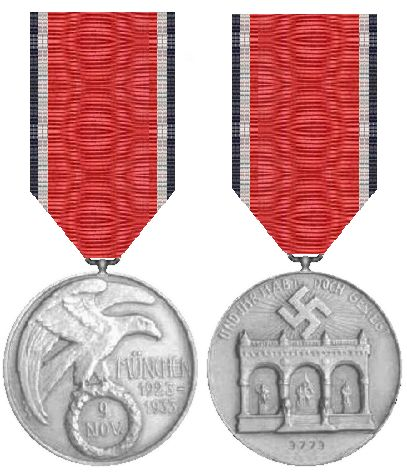
- The Blood Order medal
- Type: Political decoration
- Awarded for: Participants in the 1923 putsch and members of the party or one of its formations before January 1932
- Country: Germany
- Presented by: The Nazi Party
- Eligibility: Members of the Nazi Party or cadets from the Munich Infantry School who marched in support of the Hitler-Ludendorff-Putsch
- Status: Obsolete, illegal
- Established: March 1934
- Ribbon bar of the NSDAP Blood Order

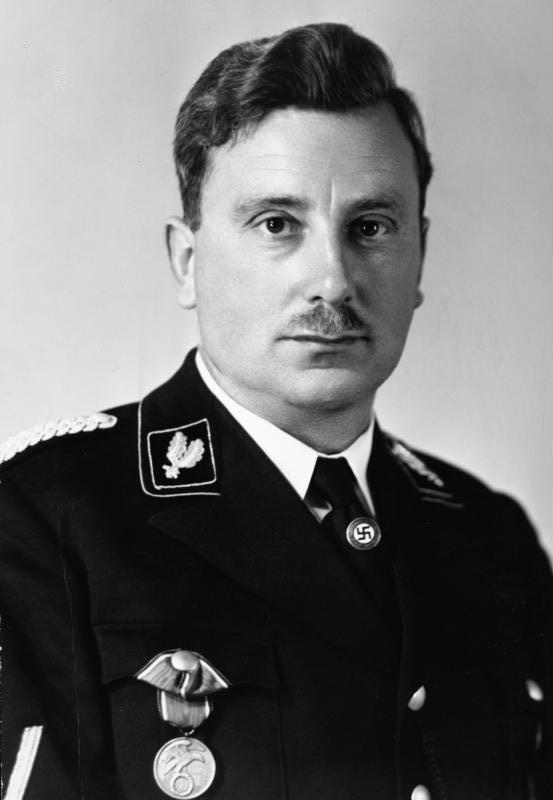
Emil Maurice wearing the Blood Order

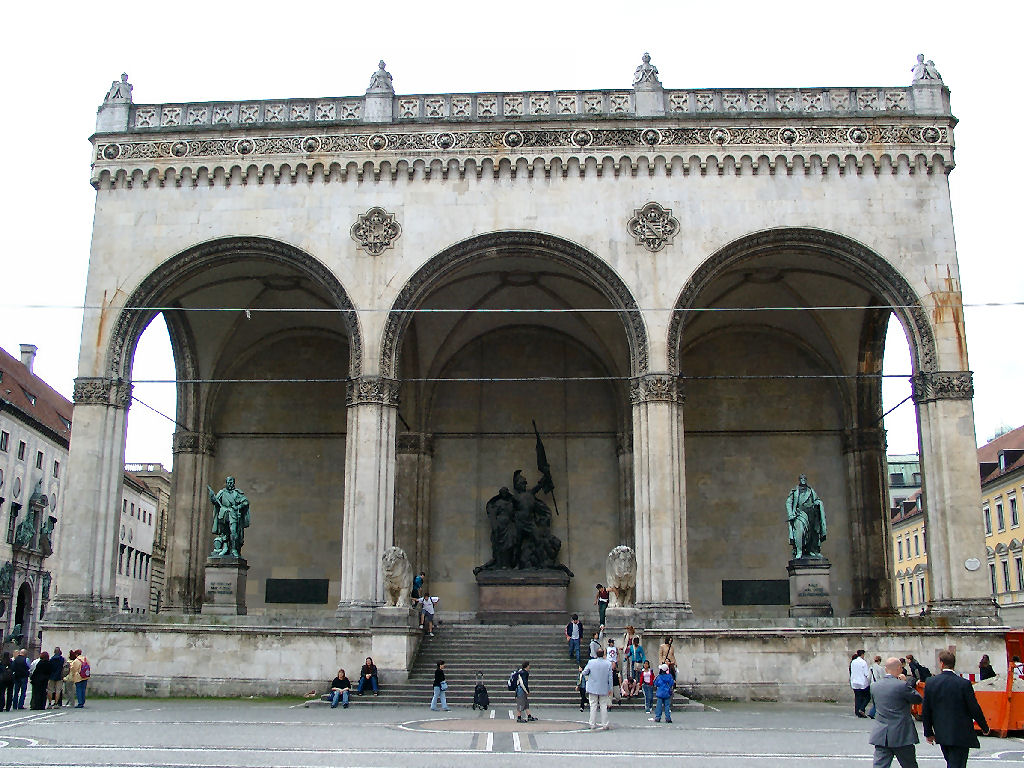
The Feldherrnhalle in Munich

The Blood Order (German: Blutorden), officially known as the Decoration in Memory of 9 November 1923 (Note: The date of the Munich putsch) (Medaille zur Erinnerung an den 9. November 1923), was one of the most prestigious decorations in the Nazi Party (NSDAP). During March 1934, Hitler authorized the Blood Order to commemorate the 9 November 1923 coup attempt of the Nazi Party. The medal is silver, with the obverse bearing a depiction of an eagle grasping an oak leaf wreath. Inside the wreath is the date 9.Nov. and to the right is the inscription München 1923–1933. The reverse shows the entrance of the Feldherrnhalle in relief (where the coup ended in defeat), and directly above is the angled swastika with sun rays in the background. Along the top edge is the inscription: "Und ihr habt doch gesiegt" ("And after all, you won").

== History ==
The first issue of the decoration, struck in 99% pure silver, was awarded to 1,500 participants in the putsch who had also been members of the Nazi Party or one of its formations before January 1932 (continuous service), or had been cadets from the Munich Infantry School who marched in support of Ludendorff. (Note: Since it was illegal under the Weimar Republic for members of the Armed Forces to belong to political parties, the former cadets, as military officers, would have been unable to join the Nazi Party. Most of the cadet recipients were never in fact Nazis.) All medals were numbered (except Hitler's and Göring's) and awarding was done very carefully. Unlike other medals, the ribbon was worn on the right breast of the uniform tunic in the form of a rosette and the medal sometimes was pinned on and suspended below.

In May 1938, to the dismay of the putsch participants, the award was extended to persons who had (a) served time in prison for Nazi activities before 1933, (b) received a death sentence which was later commuted to life imprisonment for Nazi activities before 1933, or (c) been severely wounded in the service of the Party before 1933; subsequently it was further extended to members of the Austrian Nazi Party who had participated in the 1934 July Putsch, or who had received significant prison time or injuries for Nazi activities. It could also be bestowed on certain other individuals at the discretion of Adolf Hitler, the last recipient being Reinhard Heydrich (posthumous). These subsequent medals were struck in 80% silver with serial numbers above 1500 and did not carry the maker's name (J. Fuess München) as the Type I medals did.

If a holder of this medal left the party, the medal would have to be relinquished.

In total 16 women received the award, two from the 'Altreich' (Eleonore Baur and Emma Schneider) and 14 from Austria. Given the number of original marchers in the putsch, the number of awards given under the 1938 extensions (436), and the awards for outstanding service under those same extensions, the total number of recipients numbered fewer than 6,000.

In November 1936, Hitler gave new "orders" for the "Orders and Awards" of Nazi Germany. The top NSDAP awards are listed in this order:

1. Coburg Badge
2. Nürnberg Party Badge of 1929
3. SA Treffen at Brunswick 1931
4. Golden Party Badge
5. Blood Order

followed by the Gau badges and the Golden HJ Badge.

== Selected recipients ==
- Wilhelm Adam
- Max Amann
- Eleonore Baur
- Heinrich Bennecke
- Joseph Berchtold
- Johannes Block
- Franz Bock
- Martin Bormann
- Kuno-Hans von Both
- Philipp Bouhler
- Wilhelm Bruckner
- Walter Buch
- Karl-Heinz Bürger
- Kurt Daluege
- Adolf Ritter von Denk
- Eduard Dietl
- Sepp Dietrich
- Franz Xaver Dorsch
- Anton Drexler
- Dietrich Eckart
- Hermann Esser
- Karl Fiehler
- Josef Fitzthum
- Hans Frank
- Wilhelm Frick
- Johann Baptist Fuchs
- Albert Ganzenmüller
- Ernst Girzick
- Hermann Göring
- Ulrich Graf
- Jakob Grimminger
- Ernst Hanfstaengl
- Friedrich Haselmayr
- Franz Hayler
- Edmund Heines
- Wilhelm Helfer
- Otto Herzog
- Rudolf Hess
- Walter Hewel
- Reinhard Heydrich (posthumous, June 1942)
- Friedrich Hildebrandt
- Heinrich Himmler (withdrawn, April 1945)
- Hans Hinkel
- Adolf Hitler
- Hermann Höfle
- Hans Georg Hofmann
- Adolf Hühnlein
- Ernst Kaltenbrunner
- Emil Ketterer
- Günther Korten
- Fritz Ritter von Krausser
- Werner Kreipe
- Theodor Kretschmer
- Otto von Kursell
- Ernst Ludwig Leyser
- Wilhelm Friedrich Loeper
- Erich Ludendorff
- Walter Maass
- Emil Maurice
- Josef Albert Meisinger
- Heinz Pernet
- Karl-Jesko von Puttkamer
- Helmuth Raithel
- Friedrich Josef Rauch
- Ernst Röhm
- Alfred Rosenberg
- Julius Schaub
- Julian Scherner
- Arno Schickedanz
- Wilhelm Schmid
- Julius Schreck
- Walter Schultze
- Franz Xaver Schwarz
- Franz Schwede
- Julius Streicher
- Adolf Wagner
- Robert Heinrich Wagner
- Karl Wahl
- Friedrich Weber
- Wilhelm Weiss
