= Adolf Wagner =

German Nazi Party official and politician (1890–1944)

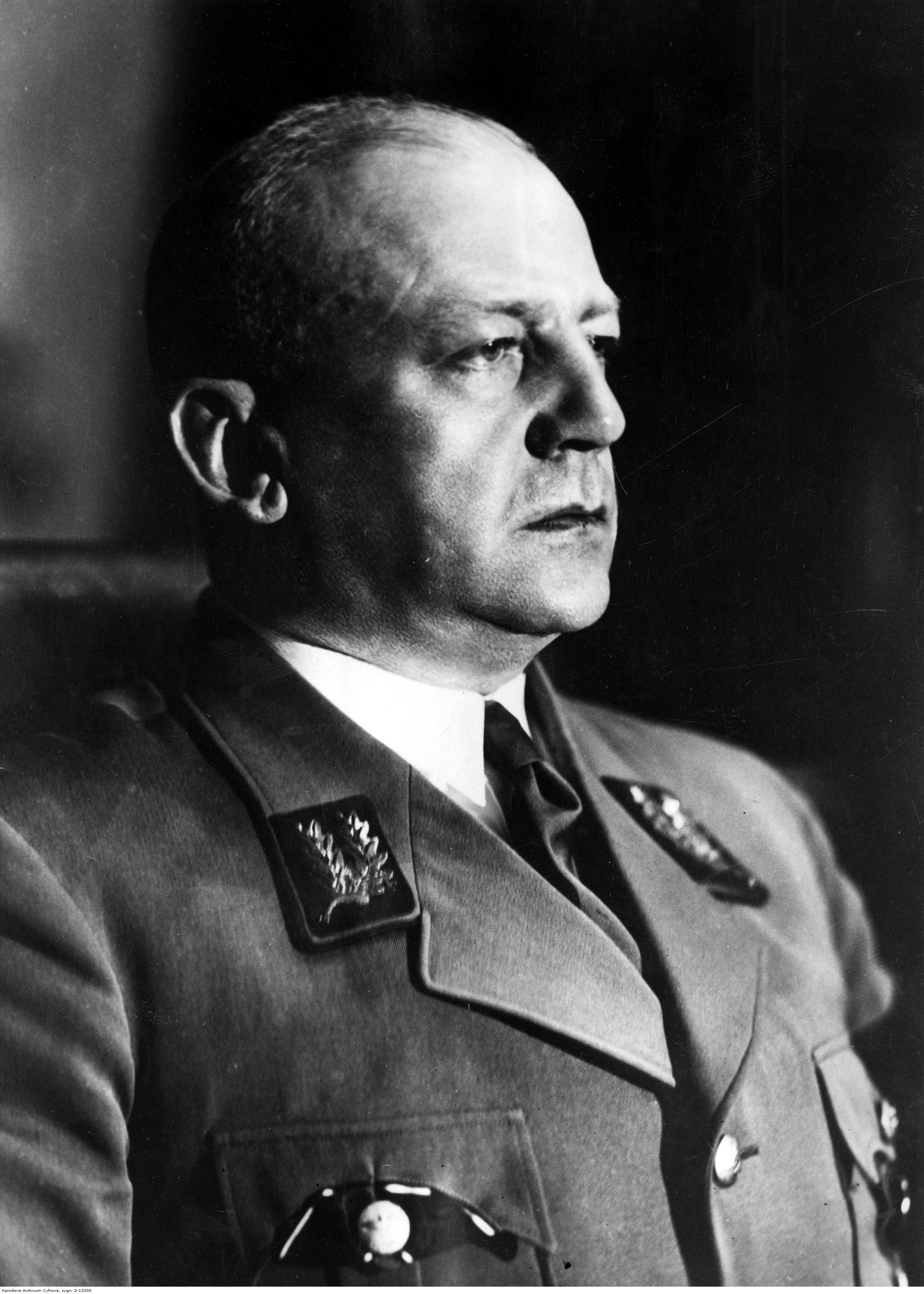

Gauleiter of Gau Munich-Upper Bavaria
- In office 16 November 1930 – 12 April 1944
- Preceded by: Office created
- Succeeded by: Paul Giesler

Minister of the Interior of Bavaria
- In office 12 April 1933 – 12 April 1944
- Preceded by: Karl Stützel
- Succeeded by: Paul Giesler

Minister of Education and Culture of Bavaria
- In office 28 November 1936 – 12 April 1944
- Preceded by: Hans Schemm
- Succeeded by: Paul Giesler

Deputy Minister-President of Bavaria
- In office 12 April 1933 – 12 April 1944
- Preceded by: Office created
- Succeeded by: Office abolished

Gauleiter of Greater Munich
- In office 1 November 1929 – 16 November 1930
- Preceded by: Office created
- Succeeded by: Office abolished

Gauleiter of Gau Upper Palatinate
- In office 1 October 1928 – 1 November 1929
- Preceded by: Office created
- Succeeded by: Franz Maierhofer

Personal details
- Born: 1 October 1890 Algringen, Alsace-Lorraine, German Empire
- Died: 12 April 1944 (aged 53) Bad Reichenhall, Nazi Germany
- Cause of death: Stroke
- Party: Nazi Party
- Other political affiliations: Völkischer Block
- Profession: Mining engineer
- Civilian awards: German Order; Blood Order

Military service
- Allegiance: German Empire
- Branch/service: Imperial German Army
- Years of service: 1909–1910; 1914–1918
- Rank: Leutnant
- Unit: Infantry Regiment 143; Infantry Regiment 135
- Battles/wars: World War I
- Military awards: Iron Cross, 1st and 2nd class

Adolf Wagner (1 October 1890 – 12 April 1944) was a German Nazi Party official and politician who served as the Gauleiter in Munich and as the powerful Interior Minister of Bavaria throughout most of the Third Reich.

== Early years ==
Born in Algringen (today, Algrange) in Alsace-Lorraine to a coal miner and his wife, Wagner attended Volksschule locally and Realschule in Metz and Pforzheim. After serving as a one-year volunteer with Infantry Regiment 143, Wagner then studied natural science and mathematics at Strasbourg University for a year and then mining at RWTH Aachen University for three years. He received his certification as a mining engineer in 1914 but when the First World War broke out he volunteered for service with the Imperial German Army. He was assigned to Infantry Regiment 135 as a non-commissioned officer on the western front, was commissioned a Leutnant in 1917 and served as a company commander and as an orderly officer at regimental headquarters. He was twice wounded, first by poison gas and in 1918 he lost his right leg below the knee. He was awarded the Iron Cross, 1st and 2nd class, and was discharged at the end of the war in 1918.

Wagner returned to Lorraine after the war but in 1919 was expelled by the French authorities when the area was returned to France under the terms of the Versailles Treaty. He moved to Bavaria and found employment as a manager at the United Coal and Ore Mining Union in Erbendorf. He later worked as a business manager at the Pinzgau Mining Company across the Bavarian border in Austria. He was employed at these companies from 1919 to 1929.

== Nazi career ==
Wagner joined the Nazi Party in 1923 (membership number 11,330) and became the Ortsgruppenleiter (Local Group Leader) in Erbendorf. He participated in the abortive Beer Hall Putsch of 9 November 1923, for which he earned the Blood Order. When the Nazi Party was banned after the failed coup, Wagner joined the Völkischer Block, a Nazi front organization. Under its banner, he, along with 22 others, was sent to the Bavarian Landtag in the April 1924 election, serving there until October 1933. In an incident in January 1932, Wagner was sentenced by a court to a fine of 250 ℛ︁ℳ︁ or ten days in jail for assaulting a journalist on the floor of the Landtag.

=== Gauleiter ===
Five months after the Nazi Party was re-established, he re-joined it on 20 July 1925. On 1 October 1928 he was appointed Gauleiter of the Upper Palatinate. On 1 November 1929 he was switched to the prestigious post of Gauleiter of Greater Munich, the seat of the Nazi movement. Finally, on 16 November 1930 his Gau absorbed the neighboring Gau of Upper Bavaria and he became Gauleiter of Gau Munich-Upper Bavaria, which was given the special designation Traditionsgau. As Gauleiter of Munich, Wagner served as the master of ceremonies for the annual commemorations of the 1923 Beer Hall Putsch every 9 November. Also, Wagner was given the honorary title of Speaker of the Party, a special designation that entitled him to read the Führer's proclamations at public events such as the annual Nazi Party rally held in Nuremberg. Wagner's pitch, intonation and speaking style were considered very similar to Adolf Hitler's.

On 10 March 1933, when the Nazis seized control of the Bavarian state government, Wagner was sent by Hitler to take charge of the Bavarian police apparatus as the State Commissioner (Staatskommissar) for the Bavarian Interior Ministry. In this post, he controlled all the security apparatus of the state. He advocated the establishment of special protective custody facilities that resulted in Heinrich Himmler, then Acting Police President in Munich, soon setting up the first Nazi concentration camp in Dachau. At the same time, he also was appointed one of the state's representatives to the Reichsrat until its abolition on 14 February 1934. On 23 March, Wagner was made a member of the Sturmabteilung (SA) with the rank of SA-Gruppenführer and he would be promoted to SA-Obergruppenführer on 9 November 1937. On 12 April 1933, he was formally appointed interior minister and also Deputy Minister-President of Bavaria. He thus wielded enormous power in both the party and the government, despite nominally reporting to Reichsstatthalter (Reich Governor) Franz Ritter von Epp. He was elected a deputy to the Reichstag in November 1933 for electoral constituency 24, Upper Bavaria-Swabia, and retained this seat until his death. On 28 November 1936, he was also made Bavarian Minister for Education and Culture.

In May 1934, Wagner secured an appointment on the staff of Deputy Führer, Rudolf Hess to head a task force charged with reform of the Reich structure. An opponent of federalism, Wagner advocated for more centralized control by the Party. By February 1935, Wagner produced a lengthy report titled "Reconstruction of the Reich" calling for the placement of all legislative and executive decision-making power in the hands of Party officials, leaving the State authorities as mere administrative entities. It envisioned new territorial divisions called Reichsgaue which cut across traditional federal boundaries. The Party heads of the new areas would be undisputed viceroys of their jurisdictions. However, Wagner's Reichsreform never got beyond the planning stage for Germany proper because, due to the competing interests involved and significant push-back from the State organs, Hitler soon lost interest. However, it eventually would serve, more or less, as the model when foreign territories were absorbed into the Reich.

=== Role in the SA purge, persecution of the Jews and 'Church Struggle' ===
Wagner played a key role during the purge of the SA leaders known as the Night of the Long Knives on 30 June 1934. When Hitler arrived in Munich, he found that Wagner had already arrested the leaders of the Munich SA. He had also set up patrols at the Munich railway station to check for wanted SA leaders as they arrived in the city. Later that day, when the governor of the Stadelheim prison refused to hand over six SA leaders to the SS execution squad because the list of names he received was unsigned, Wagner signed the document in his capacity as Bavarian Interior Minister, and the six were turned over to the SS and summarily executed.

In carrying out the Nazi Party's antisemitic policies, Wagner instigated and organized violent anti-Jewish demonstrations in the city center of Munich in May 1935 that were carried out by a mob of about 200 members of the SA and the SS. Additionally, on 9 July 1938, the main synagogue in Munich near the Marienplatz was destroyed on Wagner's orders. A few months later, during the Kristallnacht pogrom of 9–10 November 1938, rampaging Nazis also destroyed other historic synagogues throughout the city and looted Jewish shops.

As Bavarian Education Minister, on 23 April 1941 Wagner ordered that school prayer be replaced by Nazi songs and that crucifixes and religious pictures be removed from Bavarian classrooms, which outraged many Bavarian Catholics. The opposition to this move was so strong that Hitler forced Wagner to rescind the order on 28 August, one of the rare circumstances of successful public opposition in Nazi Germany.

=== Relationship with Hitler ===
Despite this setback, Hitler apparently remained on good terms with Wagner, one of the Alter Kämpfer and holder of the Golden Party Badge. Confident of his close ties with Hitler, Wagner openly boasted that he often ignored directives from Reichsministers, and that if they wanted to consult with him on issues, they would have to schedule a visit to Munich. At other times, Hitler made his airplane available to Wagner for trips to Berlin. Wagner generally had access to Hitler, and could appeal directly to him for support when conflicts arose with other officials, as he was often among the circle of intimates invited to Hitler's residence on the Obersalzberg. Rare 8 mm colour film of Wagner appears in home movies (c. 1938) filmed by Hitler's companion, Eva Braun. He can be seen talking with Hitler on the terrace of Hitler's Bavarian residence the Berghof, near Berchtesgaden.

== War years, illness and death ==
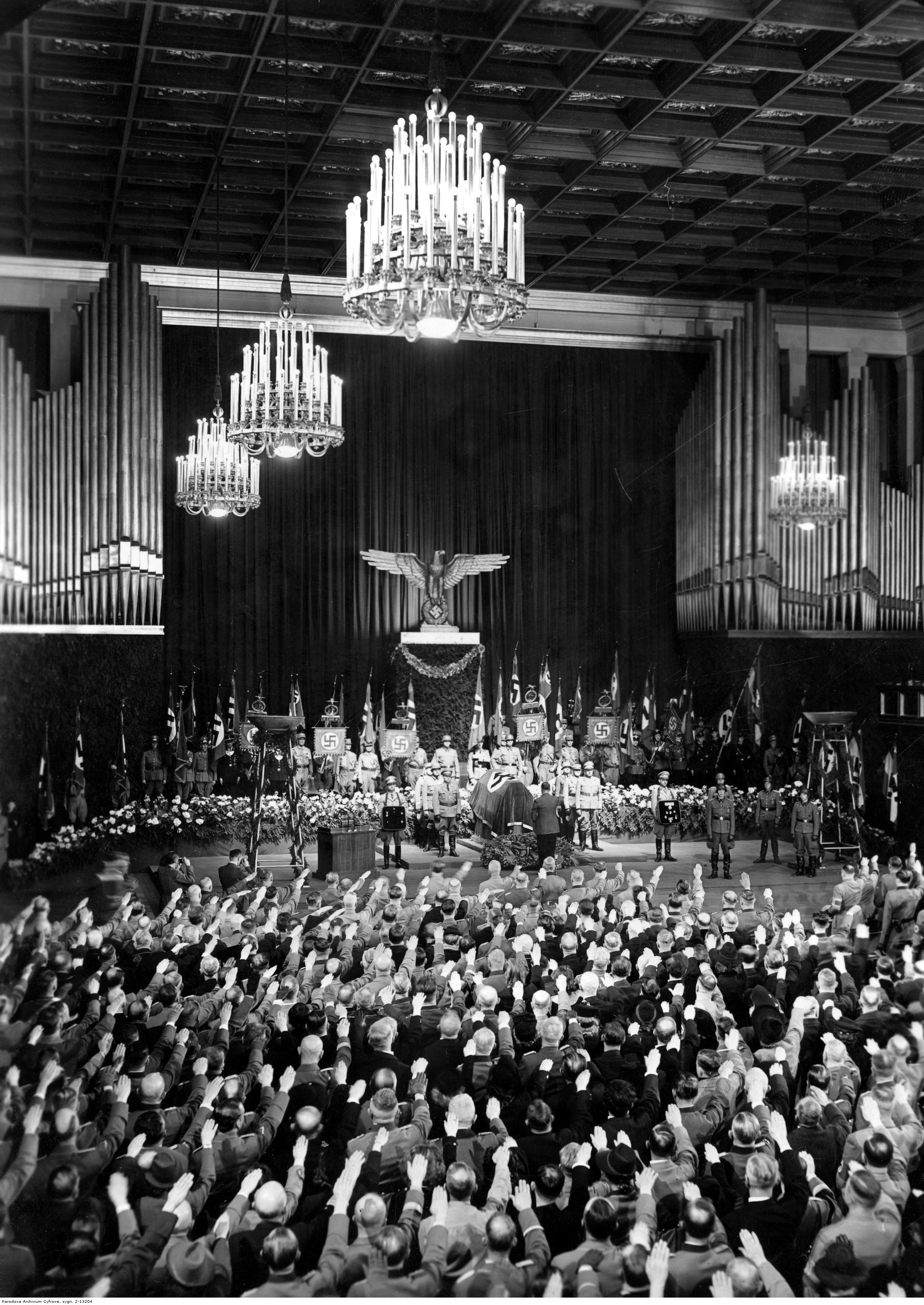
Adolf Hitler salutes at the funeral of Adolf Wagner in the congress hall of Munich's Deutsches Museum

At the outbreak of the Second World War on 1 September 1939, Wagner was named Reich Defense Commissioner for Wehrkreise (Military Districts) VII and XIII. He was the only Commissioner named to head two districts. His jurisdiction included his Gau and four other Bavarian Gaue (Bayreuth, Franconia, Mainfranken and Swabia) as well as the northwestern section of Reichsgau Sudetenland. In this position, Wagner assumed responsibility for civil defense, air defense and evacuation activities, as well as for managing the local war economy by administering wartime rationing and suppressing black market activities. On 15 November 1940, he became the Housing Commissioner for his Gau and, on 6 April 1942, he was named the Representative in Gau Munich-Upper Bavaria for Fritz Sauckel in his capacity as General Plenipotentiary for Labor Deployment. In this role, Wagner assisted in procuring forced civilian labor for Germany's wartime industries.

Wagner for many years suffered from the effects of chronic alcoholism, and his condition worsened in November 1941 after follow-up operations for his WWI leg injury. In June 1942 Wagner was still recuperating and was replaced in his official duties by Paul Giesler in an acting capacity on 23 June. Then at a Party rally in Traunstein on 15 July 1942, Wagner suffered a stroke that very seriously incapacitated him with impaired speech and mobility. Wagner nominally remained in his posts until a second stroke resulted in his death on 12 April 1944, at which time Giesler was named his permanent successor. The increasingly reclusive Führer made a rare public appearance to attend Wagner's lavish funeral on 17 April at the Deutsches Museum that included a eulogy by Minister of Propaganda Joseph Goebbels. The deceased Gauleiter was posthumously awarded the German Order, the Nazi Party's highest decoration. He was buried near the Ehrentempel (Honor Temples) which housed the remains of those killed in the Beer Hall Putsch.

== Sources ==
- Bullock, Alan (1962). Hitler: A Study in Tyranny. New York: Harper Torchbooks. ISBN 978-0-060-92020-3.
- Höffkes, Karl (1986). Hitlers politische Generale die Gauleiter des Dritten Reiches; ein biographisches Nachschlagewerk (2., überarb. und erw. Aufl ed.). Tübingen. ISBN 3-87847-163-7.
- Kershaw, Ian (2008). Hitler: A Biography. W.W. Norton & Co. ISBN 978-0-393-33761-7.
- Miller, Michael D.; Schulz, Andreas (2021). Gauleiter: The Regional Leaders of the Nazi Party and Their Deputies, 1925 - 1945. Vol. 3 (Fritz Sauckel - Hans Zimmermann). Fonthill Media. ISBN 978-1-781-55826-3.
- Müller, Winfried: Gauleiter als Minister. Die Gauleiter Hans Schemm, Adolf Wagner, Paul Giesler und das Bayerische Staatsministerium für Unterricht und Kultus 1933-1945, In: Zeitschrift für Bayerische Landesgeschichte 60, 1997, (973-1021).
- Orlow, Dietrich (1973). The History of the Nazi Party: 1933-1945. University of Pittsburgh Press. ISBN 0-822-9-3253-9.
- Zentner, Christian; Bedürftig, Friedemann, eds. (1997) [1991]. The Encyclopedia of the Third Reich. New York: Da Capo Press. ISBN 978-0-306-80793-0.
