= Gruppe Hochland (Sturmabteilung) =

Group of the Sturmabteilung

SA-Gruppe Hochland
- Gorget patches of SA-Gruppe Hochland, Oberscharführer in Standarte 1/ Sturm 1
- Leaders: Fritz Ritter von Kraußer; Karl von Eberstein; Johann Baptist Fuchs; Wilhelm Helfer; Wilhelm Schmid
- Founded: November 3, 1931
- Dates active: 1931–1945
- Dissolved: May 8, 1945 (de facto); October 10, 1945 (de jure)
- Country: Weimar Republic; Nazi Germany
- Allegiance: Nazi Party
- Headquarters: Munich
- Active regions: Gau Munich-Upper Bavaria; Gau Swabia
- Ideology: Nazism
- Size: 20,044 (1932)

SA-Gruppe Hochland (SA-Group Highland), was an organizational unit of the Sturmabteilung (SA), the largest paramilitary organization of the Nazi Party. SA-Gruppe Hochland was established in May 1931 and existed during the Weimar Republic and Nazi Germany. It operated in southern Bavaria with its headquarters in Munich. For most of its history, this unit was commanded by Wilhelm Helfer. Other notable members of the unit included Fritz Ritter von Kraußer, Karl von Eberstein, Johann Baptist Fuchs, and Wilhelm Schmid, among others. Several of the unit's officers were extrajudicially killed by the Schutzstaffel (SS) during the Night of the Long Knives between June 30 and July 2, 1934. At the end of the Second World War, the unit was disbanded along with the rest of the SA.

== Background and formation ==
After the re-founding of the Nazi Party in 1925, Adolf Hitler also began the process of reestablishing the Party's paramilitary organization, the Sturmabteilung (SA), which had been disbanded after the failed Beer Hall Putsch of November 1923. In 1926, the new SA Oberste SA-Führer, Franz Pfeffer von Salomon, organized the SA along military lines. The smallest unit, or Gruppe (after 1931, Schar, or squad) consisted of six to twelve men. Five or six of these units formed a Trupp (platoon), and three to five Truppe made up a Sturm (company). Three to five Sturme comprised a Standarte (regiment). Several Standarten from the same area were combined to form a Gausturm.

In Bavaria, the home region and stronghold of the Nazi Party, two Gausturme were formed, one for Franconia and one for Upper Bavaria–Swabia. In the capital city of Munich, there were three Sturme, which initially formed a Standarte and later a Brigade. From mid-1927, the Munich SA was subordinated to the Gausturm of Upper Bavaria-Swabia, which was headed by Walter Buch. By May 1928, the Munich Standarte expanded to comprise six Sturme. The SA-Brigade "Greater Munich" was divided into Standarte I and II in March 1929 and a third, Standarte Munich-Land, was added in August.

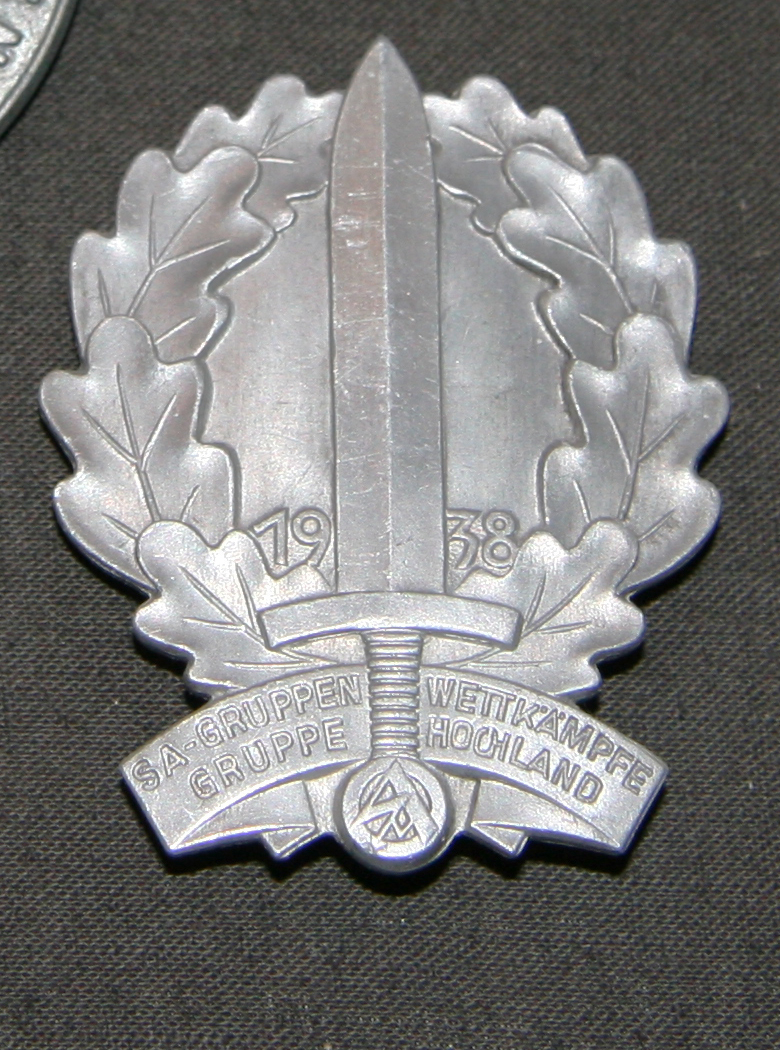
An SA-Gruppe Hochland badge for participation in the 1938 SA Gruppenwettkämpfe (group competitions)

In September 1930, following the resignation of Pfeffer von Salomon, Hitler himself took command of the SA as Oberste SA-Führer and, in January 1931, appointed Ernst Röhm to take over the day-to-day management as SA-Stabschef (chief of staff). By February, Röhm instituted a series of organizational reforms that saw the replacement of the SA-Gausturm by the SA-Untergruppe, which reported to a new, even larger formation, the SA-Gruppe, headed by an SA-Gruppenführer (group leader) who answered only to Röhm, or to Hitler. Another Röhm reform was the establishment of the Sturmbann (battalion) as an intermediate unit between the Sturm and the Untergruppe.

In Bavaria, Röhm established "Munich-Upper Bavaria" as an independent SA-Untergruppe of the SA-Gruppe-Süd and made it directly subordinate to him. Three Sturmbanne were based in Munich proper and five in the surrounding Munich area for a total of eight in the Untergruppe. On November 3, 1931, Röhm elevated the Untergruppe "Munich-Upper Bavaria" to the status of an independent Gruppe as SA-Gruppe Hochland under the command of Fritz Ritter von Kraußer.

== Jurisdictional area ==
The jurisdictional area of SA-Gruppe Hochland included two of the Nazi Party Gaue in Bavaria: Gau Munich-Upper Bavaria and Gau Swabia, and had its headquarters in the city of Munich. SA-Gruppe Hochland bordered on the following SA units: SA-Gruppe Bayerische-Ostmark (Gau Bayreuth), SA-Gruppe Franken (Gau Franconia and Gau Lower Franconia) and SA-Gruppe Südwest (Gau Baden and Gau Württemberg-Hohenzollern).

== Organization and growth ==
The flag of Gebirgsjäger Standarte 130 of SA-Gruppe Hochland

Like any other SA-Gruppe, SA-Gruppe Hochland consisted of a total of anywhere from two to seven Standarte, each with a total of three to five Stürmbanne and between three and five Stürme per Stürmbann. These numbers fluctuated between 1931 and 1945.

In November 1930, the area where SA-Gruppe Hochland was formed had a total of 4,522 SA men, by November 1931 this had risen to 8,766 and in August 1932, the total reached 20,044.

SA-Gruppe Hochland, due to its proximity to the Bavarian Alps, included several specialized Gebirgsjäger (mountain infantry) units, recruited from among the huntsmen, mountaineers, foresters and skiers of southern Bavaria and Austria. Other specialist detachments within SA-Gruppe Hochland were:

- Flieger Standarte (flying squadron)
- Jäger Standarte (light infantry)
- Leibstandarte (life guard)
- Motorstandarte (motorcycle unit)
- Security Standarte (SA-Feldjägerkorps)

Munich was also the site of the Reichsführerschule (Reich leadership school) for training SA leaders, with a focus on Nazi ideology and propaganda.

== Commanders ==
The commanders of SA-Gruppe Hochland carried the title of SA-Führer Hochland and generally held the rank of SA-Gruppenführer. The unit had nine commanders during its 14 year existence, two of whom died in office.

Commanders of SA-Gruppe Hochland
Name	Tenure
Fritz Ritter von Kraußer	November 3, 1931 – February 13, 1932
Karl von Eberstein	July 1, 1932 – February 19, 1933
Johann Baptist Fuchs	February 20, 1933 – March 14, 1933
Wilhelm Helfer	March 15, 1933 – September 14, 1933
Wilhelm Schmid	September 15, 1933 – June 30, 1934 (d.)
Wilhelm Helfer	July 10, 1934 – April 30, 1941
Richard Wagenbauer	February 1, 1942 – October 20, 1942 (d.)
Albert Heinz (acting)	October 20, 1942 – June 1, 1943
Bernhard Hofmann	June 1, 1943 – May 8, 1945

== Notable members ==
In addition to the commanding officers, other notable members of SA-Gruppe Hochland included:

- Paul Giesler, its chief of staff from September 1936 through May 1938
- August Schmidhuber, deputy commandant, then commandant of the SA school "Seeon" from October 1934 to May 1935
- Hans Erwin Graf von Spreti-Weilbach

== Night of the Long Knives ==
A growing rift between Röhm and Hitler over the role of the SA, together with Hitler's desire to appease the leadership of the Reichswehr, the German military, who feared and distrusted the rapidly expanding SA as a potential rival, led to the Night of the Long Knives. Hitler used his smaller bodyguard unit, the Schutzstaffel (SS), to essentially decapitate the leadership of the SA via a series of extrajudicial killings. Between June 30 and July 2, 1934, Röhm and a number of his top lieutenants were murdered. Among the victims were several prominent members of the SA-Gruppe Hochland, including its current commander, Wilhelm Schmid, its first commander, Fritz Ritter von Kraußer, and Hans Erwin Graf von Spreti-Weilbach, Röhm's chief adjutant and a former officer in the unit.

== Uniform and insignia ==
The Schulterstück (shoulder board) worn by SA-Gruppe Hochland

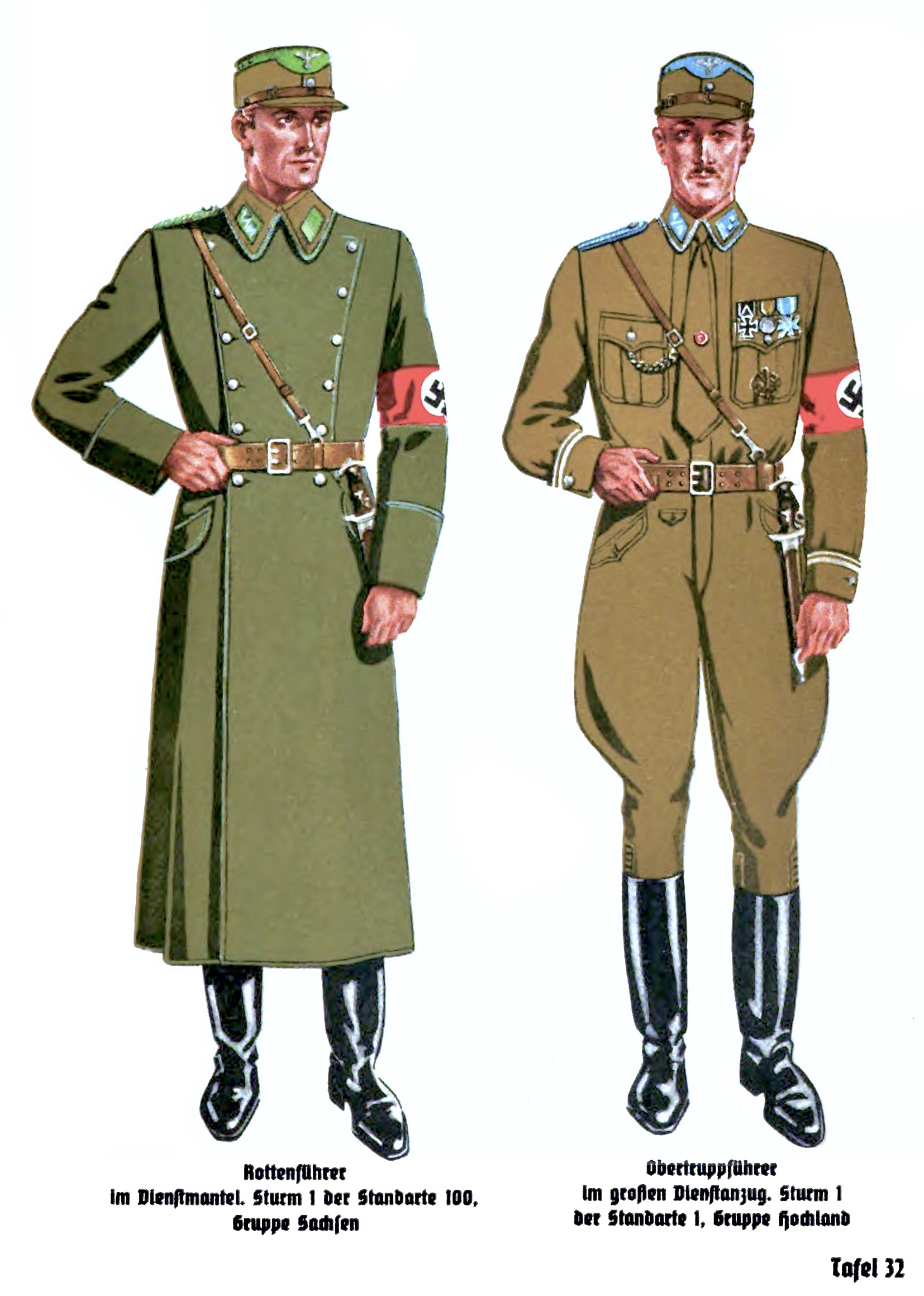
A Sturmabteilung uniform book shows the uniform of SA-Gruppe Sachsen (Saxony) on the left and SA-Gruppe Hochland on the right

All members of SA-Gruppe Hochland wore the regular uniform of the Sturmabteilung. The official color of the Gruppe, as well as SA-Gruppe Bayerische-Ostmark, was light blue. All members of the unit were entitled to wear an edelweiss flower or edelweiss badge on the left side of the SA Schaftmütze cap. Designated Jäger units of SA-Gruppe Hochland wore the standard blue collar tab but with green trim interwoven with the light blue. The Gebirgsjäger units displayed the green initials "GJ" on the right collar tab. They also wore a Bergmütze, padded parkas and heavy climbing shoes.

SA-Gruppe Hochland was one of the only units of the SA which allowed its members to wear Lederhosen, a traditional male garb of the German Tracht. The Lederhosen were only to be worn in the summer months and strictly with the rest of the regulation SA uniform.

== Role in the Second World War ==
During the Second World War the SA, including SA-Gruppe Hochland, was used for cleanup and rescue operations after Allied air raids, as well as for searching for prisoners of war who might have escaped during those raids. To secure the hinterland, to which large numbers of prisoners of war and forced laborers had been transported, a "Landwacht" (country guard) was created on January 17, 1942, followed by the establishment of a "Stadtwacht" (city guard) on December 9, 1942. Its members were considered auxiliaries of the local police departments. In 1944, the SA still had 1,381 full-time leaders. Additional duties included participation in the construction of makeshift fortifications and in the formation of the Volkssturm, the Nazi Party's people's militia, whose inspector for firearms training was Wilhelm Schepmann, Viktor Lutze's successor as SA-Stabschef.

== Dissolution ==
The SA-Gruppe Hochland effectively ceased to exist with Germany's unconditional surrender on May 8, 1945. The Allied Control Council in its Law No. 2 of October 10, 1945, formally ordered the dissolution of the SA and all its components.
