= Bernhard Hofmann =

German SA general (1896–1982)

Gaustabsführer, Volkssturm Gau Munich-Upper Bavaria
- In office 18 October 1944 – 8 May 1945
- Preceded by: Position created
- Succeeded by: Position abolished

Führer, SA-Gruppe Hochland
- In office 1 June 1943 – 8 May 1945
- Preceded by: Albert Heinz
- Succeeded by: Position abolished

Stabsführer, SA-Gruppe Pommern
- In office 1 January 1938 – 31 May 1943

Personal details
- Born: 22 November 1896 Jahnsbach, Kingdom of Saxony, German Empire
- Died: 19 November 1982 (aged 85) Crailsheim, Baden-Württemberg, West Germany
- Party: Nazi Party
- Education: Reutlingen University
- Occupation: Commercial worker, textile industry

Military service
- Allegiance: German Empire; Weimar Republic; Nazi Germany
- Branch/service: Royal Saxon Army; Freikorps; Wehrmacht
- Years of service: 1915–1920; 1935–1943
- Rank: Oberleutnant; Oberstleutnant
- Unit: Foot Artillery Regiment 19 (2nd Saxon)
- Commands: 1st Battalion, 427th Infantry Regiment
- Battles/wars: World War I World War II
- Awards: Knight's Cross of the Iron Cross

Bernhard Hofmann (22 November 1896 – 19 November 1982) was a German military officer and a Nazi Party politician. He fought in both world wars and, as an SA-Gruppenführer in the Nazi Sturmabteilung, commanded the SA-Gruppe Hochland in Munich from June 1943 until Germany's surrender in May 1945.

== Early life ==
Hofmann was born in the hamlet of Jahnsbach, part of the town of Thum, in the Kingdom of Saxony. He attended the local Volksschule and the Realschule in Chemnitz. After graduation, he worked as an apprentice in his father's factory until February 1915. He then joined the Royal Saxon Army as a one-year volunteer, serving in Foot Artillery Regiment 19 (2nd Royal Saxon) and taking part in the First World War with the rank of Leutnant of reserves. He served as an observation officer, an intelligence officer and as an orderly officer at the battalion and regiment headquarters. In the summer of 1919, he led a Freikorps unit from Württemberg, the Reutlingen Volunteer Company. After his discharge from the military on 21 January 1920, Hofmann studied at Reutlingen University and subsequently worked as a commercial employee in the textile industry in Saxony. In 1924, he joined Der Stahlhelm, the German war veterans' association.

== Nazi Party and SA career ==
Hofmann left Der Stahlhelm and joined the Nazi Party on 1 May 1930 (membership number 244,096) and its paramilitary organization, the Sturmabteilung (SA) in Chemnitz. In the following years, Hofmann steadily rose through the ranks within the SA. From January to October 1933, he led an SA-Sturmbann in Annaberg-Buchholz, advancing to the command of SA-Standarte 351 on 15 October 1933, and SA-Standarte 244 on 15 September 1935. On 1 December 1936, he was transferred to the command of SA-Brigade 8 "Grenzland-Süd" in Schneidemühl (today, Piła). On 1 January 1938, he was assigned as the Stabsfuhrer (chief of staff) of SA-Gruppe Pommern in Gau Pomerania with his headquarters at Stettin (today, Szczecin). He retained this post until 1 June 1943.

Also active in Nazi Party politics, Hofmann was the press officer and organizational leader of the Chemnitz Ortsgruppe (local branch) from 1930 and he became a member of the city council of Annaberg-Buchholz in January 1934. He was included on the list of candidates for the March 1936 election to the Reichstag but did not receive a mandate.

== Second World War ==
On 1 October 1935, Hofmann was accepted into the Wehrmacht as an Oberleutnant in the reserves, and was promoted to Hauptmann on 1 November 1937. On 29 August 1939, he was called up for active military service in the infantry and took part in the Battle of France in May–June 1940 and the German invasion of the Soviet Union in June 1941. Promoted to Major on 1 January 1942, he was the commander of the 1st Battalion of the 427th Infantry Regiment. He was awarded the Knight's Cross of the Iron Cross on 26 September 1942 and was promoted to SA-Gruppenführer on 22 October. On 31 May 1943, Hofmann was transferred to the Führerreserve and promoted to Oberstleutnant. The next day, he was ordered to Munich to take up the command of SA-Gruppe Hochland, becoming its last commander and leading it until the fall of the Nazi regime in May 1945. On 20 June 1943, he was discharged from military service.

From 18 October 1944, Hofmann also served as the Gaustabsführer (Gau staff leader) of the Volkssturm, the Nazi Party people's militia, in Gau Munich-Upper Bavaria. From 25 to 28 April 1945, he served as the Kampfkommandant (combat commandant) of Munich until he was relieved of this command due to a perceived lack of toughness. He was replaced by Generalleutnant Rudolf Hübner.

Little is documented about Hofmann's post-war life and he died in Crailsheim in November 1982.

== Dates of SA rank ==
SA Ranks
Date	Rank
1 May 1930	SA-Scharführer
10 July 1931	SA-Truppführer
1 July 1932	SA-Sturmführer
1 April 1933	SA-Sturmbannführer
29 October 1933	SA-Obersturmbannführer
9 November 1934	SA-Standartenführer
9 November 1937	SA-Oberführer
30 January 1939	SA-Brigadeführer
22 October 1942	SA-Gruppenführer

== Sources ==
- Joachim Lilla: Hofmann, Bernhard, in: Staatsminister, leitende Verwaltungsbeamte und (NS-)Funktionsträger in Bayern 1918 bis 1945
