= Johann Baptist Fuchs =

German police official and SA general (1877–1938)

Chief of Liaison, Supreme SA Leadership (OSAF), Office of the Deputy Führer
- In office 1 May 1935 – 1 May 1937

Führer, Bavarian SA-Feldjägerkorps
- In office 27 February 1934 – 1 April 1935

OSAF Special Plenipotentiary for Bavaria
- In office 29 August 1933 – 14 November 1934

OSAF Special Commissioner, Bavarian Auxiliary Security Police
- In office 1 May 1933 – 29 August 1933

Chief, OSAF Quartermaster Staff
- In office 24 February 1931 – 15 March 1933

Personal details
- Born: 8 June 1877 Regensburg, Kingdom of Bavaria, German Empire
- Died: 18 November 1938 (aged 61) Munich, Nazi Germany
- Party: Nazi Party
- Education: Ludwig-Maximilians-Universität München
- Profession: Military officer; Police official
- Civilian awards: Blood Order
- Nickname: Hans

Military service
- Allegiance: German Empire
- Branch/service: Royal Bavarian Army; Freikorps
- Years of service: 1899–1919
- Rank: Major
- Battles/wars: World War I
- Military awards: Iron Cross, 1st and 2nd class Bavarian Military Merit Order, 4th class with crown and swords

Johann Baptist Fuchs (8 June 1877 – 18 November 1938) was a German professional military officer who served in the Royal Bavarian Army during the First World War, and also was a member of the post-war Freikorps. He became a senior state police official in Bavaria and participated in Adolf Hitler's Beer Hall Putsch. He joined the Nazi Party and its paramilitary unit, the Sturmabteilung (SA), holding several high-level staff positions and rising to the rank of SA-Obergruppenführer.

== Early life and military service ==
Fuchs was born in Regensburg, the son of a railway conductor. He attended Volksschule and a humanistic Gymnasium, graduating with his Abitur. In 1897, he entered the Royal Bavarian Army as a Fahnenjunker (military cadet) with the 17th Field Artillery Regiment, headquartered in Germersheim. He attended the war school in Munich and, in March 1899, was commissioned as a Leutnant. From 1906, he served as a battalion adjutant, and he was promoted to Oberleutnant in March 1910.

Shortly after the outbreak of the First World War, Fuchs was promoted to Hauptmann in September 1914, and served successively as adjutant to III Army Corps, Landwehr Infantry Brigade 13 and Reserve Infantry Brigade 17. In November 1917, he was given command of a battalion in Reserve Infantry Regiment 23. In February 1918, he became a general staff officer candidate, and then served as a general staff officer with several Bavarian infantry and field artillery units until falling ill with heart disease in May. During his war service, Fuchs was decorated with the Iron Cross, 1st and 2nd class and the Bavarian Military Merit Order, 4th class with crown and swords.

After the end of the war, Fuchs remained in the military as the chief of staff of the Freikorps Bamberg and a battalion commander with the Wehrregiment München (Munich Defense Regiment), a unit formed to occupy and pacify Munich after the suppression of the Bavarian Soviet Republic in May 1919. He remained with that unit from July through the end of September 1919, and was discharged from military service with the rank of Major.

== Bavarian police official ==
At the beginning of October 1919, Fuchs joined the Bavarian Landespolizei (State Police), where he was employed as chief of staff at police headquarters in Munich until February 1923. He then became a Referent (advisor) for Abschnittkommando (section commands) II and III in Munich. In mid-November 1923, he moved to the state police headquarters in Ansbach and left the police service there at the end of October 1925 with the rank of Major der Polizei due to unfitness for duty. He then studied law and political science for four semesters at the Ludwig-Maximilians-Universität München between 1923 and 1925. From 1925 to 1931, he worked as an independent businessman in the insurance industry.

== Career in the Sturmabteilung (SA) ==
Fuchs took part in Adolf Hitler's failed Beer Hall Putsch in November 1923, for which he would later be awarded the Blood Order. He joined the Nazi Party on 1 February 1931 (membership number 411,570) at the Ortsgruppe Braunhaus (local group Brown House). At the same time, he was accepted into the Sturmabteilung (SA) with the rank of SA-Gruppenführer and became a full-time SA-Führer on the staff of the Supreme SA Leadership (OSAF). On 24 February 1931, he was appointed the chief of the OSAF quartermaster staff where he served until mid-March 1933. In addition, he briefly succeeded Karl von Eberstein as the acting Führer of SA-Gruppe Hochland, commanding the SA troops in Upper Bavaria and Swabia from 20 February to 14 March 1933.

From mid-March 1933 to the end of December 1933, Fuchs was employed in the Bavarian Ministry of the Interior as the Sonderkommissar (Special Commissioner) of the Auxiliary Security Police. He rejoined the Bavarian Landespolizei at the beginning of April 1933 and immediately was advanced to the rank of Oberst der Polizei. He was assigned, from the beginning of May to the end of August 1933, as the OSAF Sonderkommissar for the Bavarian Auxiliary Security Police. He again retired from police service on 1 September 1933, and was advanced to the post of OSAF Sonderbevollmächtigter (Special Plenipotentiary) for the government of the State of Bavaria until 14 November 1934. During this assignment, he was promoted to the rank of SA-Obergruppenführer on 9 November 1933.

On 27 February 1934, Fuchs was placed in charge of a specialized SA component in Bavaria known as the SA-Feldjägerkorps. This unit was involved in the repression of the Nazis' political enemies until it was dissolved on 1 April 1935. On 1 May 1935, Fuchs became the OSAF Chief of Liaison to the Representative for Settlement Matters on the staff of Deputy Führer Rudolf Hess. Finally in May 1937, he was assigned as a staff member of the SA-Leadership Corps, where he remained until his death in Munich in November 1938.

== SA and police ranks ==
=== SA ranks ===
SA ranks
Date	Rank
1 October 1922	Major der Polizei
24 February 1931	SA-Gruppenführer
9 November 1933	SA-Obergruppenführer
1 April 1933	Oberstleutnant der Polizei
1 April 1933	Oberst der Polizei

== Sources ==
- Campbell, Bruce (1998). The SA Generals and the Rise of Nazism. Lexington: University Press of Kentucky. ISBN 978-0-813-12047-8.
- Lilla, Joachim: Fuchs, Johann Baptist, in Staatsminister, leitende Verwaltungsbeamte und (NS-)Funktionsträger in Bayern 1918 bis 1945
- Miller, Michael D.; Schulz, Andreas (2015). Leaders of the Storm Troops. Vol. 1. Solihull, England: Helion & Company. ISBN 978-1-909-98287-1.
- Siemens, Daniel (2017). Stormtroopers: A New History of Hitler's Brownshirts. New Haven: Yale University Press. ISBN 978-0-300-19681-8.
