= Karl von Eberstein =

German Nazi Party official, Higher SS and Police Leader

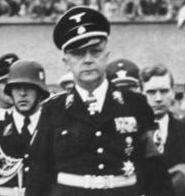
- Eberstein in 1938

Police President, Munich
- In office 1 April 1933 – 23 October 1941
- Preceded by: Heinrich Himmler

Reichstag Deputy
- In office 5 March 1933 – 20 April 1945

Personal details
- Born: Friedrich Karl Freiherr von Eberstein; 14 January 1894 Halle, Kingdom of Prussia, German Empire
- Died: 10 February 1979 (aged 85) Tegernsee, West Germany
- Party: Nazi Party
- Civilian awards: Golden Party Badge

Military service
- Allegiance: German Empire; Nazi Germany
- Branch/service: Royal Prussian Army; Freikorps; Reichswehr; Schutzstaffel
- Years of service: 1914–1918; 1919–1921; 1933–1945
- Rank: Leutnant; SS-Obergruppenführer and General of police and the Waffen-SS
- Commands: Higher SS and Police Leader, Main and Süd
- Battles/wars: World War I Kapp Putsch; Third Silesian uprising World War II
- Military awards: Iron Cross, 1st and 2nd class War Merit Cross 1st and 2nd class with swords

Friedrich Karl Freiherr von Eberstein (14 January 1894 – 10 February 1979) was a member of the German nobility, early member of the Nazi Party, the SA, and the SS (introducing Reinhard Heydrich to Heinrich Himmler in July 1931). He was elected to the Reichstag and held the position of the chief of the Munich Police during the Nazi era. Eberstein was a witness at the Nuremberg Trials.

== Early life and career ==
Eberstein was born on 14 January 1894 in Halle on the Saale, of the Dillenburger branch of the von Eberstein family. His father was an army Major. Eberstein attended the Royal Prussian cadet schools at Naumburg and Lichterfelde between 1904 and 1912. He then studied agriculture at the University of Halle until the outbreak of the First World War in August 1914. He enlisted as a war volunteer with the 75th Field Artillery Regiment. He served as a battery commander in the field with the 17th Field Artillery Regiment as a Leutnant of reserves, and earned the Iron Cross, 1st and 2nd class. He was also a balloon observer.

After the end of the war, Eberstein fought as a member of the Freikorps Maercker in Wittenberg in central Germany and the Freikorps Roßbach, with which he participated in the Kapp Putsch of March 1920 that attempted to overthrow the recently established Weimar Republic. He also began an apprenticeship in banking. He served in the Reichswehr as a battery chief in Artillery Regiment 16 but was discharged from the military in July 1920 in the wake of the Kapp Putsch. He joined the Halle Schutzpolizei (protection police) and helped to put down a Communist rebellion in Halle in April and May 1921. From May to September 1921, he served as a company commander and regimental adjutant with a Freikorp unit in Upper Silesia during the third Siesian uprising. From 1919 to 1924, he was also active in Der Stahlhelm, the German veterans organization.

Eberstein joined the Nazi Party in 1922, but quit after the failed Beer Hall Putsch in November 1923. He then re-joined the Party in 1925 (membership number 15,067). He was also an early member of the Schutzstaffel (SS number: 1,386) and on the staff of Heinrich Himmler. According to Jonathan Petropoulos, Eberstein was part of Himmler's strategy to attract members of the nobility and aristocracy to the SS. Eberstein was commissioned as an SS-Sturmführer on 1 April 1929. However, he left the SS and transferred to the Sturmabteilung (SA) on 1 July 1930. His rise in that organization was rapid, being promoted to SA-Standartenführer in February 1931, SA-Brigadeführer in November 1931 and, finally, SA-Gruppenführer on 15 September 1932. He then left the SA and returned to the SS on 20 February 1933, shortly after the Nazi seizure of power.

At the March 1933 parliamentary election, Eberstein was elected as a deputy to the Reichstag from electoral constituency 12, Thuringia. He remained a Reichstag deputy until 1945, switching to constituency 24, Upper Bavaria–Swabia, at the March 1936 election.

Eberstein reached the rank of SS-Obergruppenführer on 30 January 1936. He held several major SS commands, as Führer of SS-Oberabschnitt Mitte, headquartered in Halle, from November 1933 to April 1936 and SS-Oberabschnitt Süd, headquartered in Munich, from April 1936 until April 1945. On 1 April 1936, he succeeded Himmler as police president of Munich and held this post until 23 October 1941. He was also named the Higher SS and Police Leader for Wehrkreis (military district) XIII based in Nuremberg from March 1938 to December 1942, as well as for Wehrkreis VII, based in Munich, from March 1938 until April 1945. As the highest SS commander in Bavaria, Dachau concentration camp fell under Eberstein's jurisdiction.

== Heydrich and Himmler ==
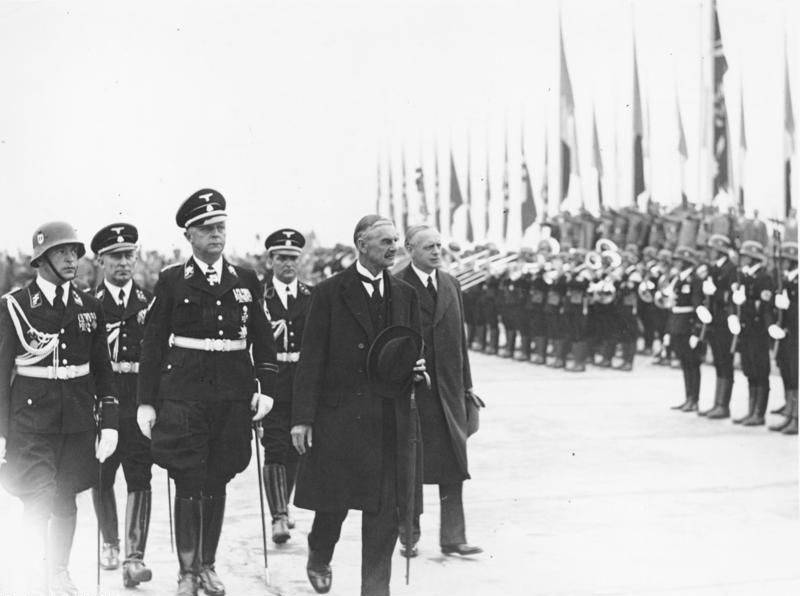
Eberstein with British Prime Minister Neville Chamberlain and Joachim von Ribbentrop in 1938

Eberstein played a part in the first meeting of the two major leaders of both the SS and later the Holocaust: Reinhard Heydrich and Heinrich Himmler. Eberstein and Heydrich's families were both from Halle on the Saale. His mother was Heydrich's godmother. He was also a friend of Lina Heydrich, Reinhard Heydrich's wife. Acting on the advice of Karl von Eberstein, Himmler agreed to interview Heydrich. When Himmler cancelled Heydrich's interview in Munich due to alleged illness, Lina ignored the message, and sent Heydrich on a Munich bound train. Karl met Heydrich at the station and drove him to meet Himmler. Himmler received Heydrich and hired him as the chief of the new SS 'Ic Service' or Intelligence Service, which would later become known as the Sicherheitsdienst (SD).

== Role during Kristallnacht ==
Eberstein was the police president of Munich during Kristallnacht. On 10 November 1938, at 1:20 a.m., Heydrich sent out a telegram to various police organizations giving orders for police behavior during the riots. At 2:10 Eberstein sent a telegram to the State Police HQ of Augsburg, Nürnberg, Würzburg, and Neustadt a.d. Weinstraße, the Regierungspräsident, and the Gauleiter, with the subject line "Anti-Jewish Measures". It relayed orders "from the Berlin HQ of the State Police", saying that "Anti-Jewish demonstrations" would occur, with synagogues and Jewish communal centers as targets, and that the demonstrations were not to be interfered with, except to prevent looting and excesses. The Ordnungspolizei or Orpo (uniform order police) would "...do nothing to hinder the demonstrations", but the criminal police and state police would wear plain-clothes. The SS troops could help, but the state police was supposed to maintain control. It went on to state that between 20 and 30,000 Jews would be arrested in Germany. It concluded: "...Every effort will be made to arrest immediately as many Jews as the jails will hold, primarily healthy male and well-to-do adults of not too advanced age". A document from Beutel (probably Lothar Beutel), HQ of State Police Munich, six minutes later, stated that "officers of the state and criminal police" would accompany the demonstrators in plain-clothes, allow them to destroy Jewish shops and homes, but to prevent looting, after which the Orpo would secure the destroyed buildings.

David Irving contends that Eberstein was a witness to Hitler's anger on that night, and that his testimony at Nuremberg helped prove that Hitler did not approve of Kristallnacht. This claim was refuted at the Irving v. Lipstadt trial, when Irving sued Lipstadt for calling him a Holocaust denier. Evans, in defense of Lipstadt, claimed that it made no sense for Eberstein to send his telegram of 2:10 a.m. if he had earlier that night listened to Hitler tirade angrily against the pogrom. The judge at the trial agreed that Irving "seriously misrepresents the available contemporaneous evidence".

== Stalag VII A Moosburg and the Gestapo ==
In late 1941, and early 1942, Eberstein was involved in a case involving Soviet Prisoners of War (POWs) at Stalag VII A, Moosburg, and the conflict between certain military officers and the SS over the murder of the POWs.

The Gestapo was having problems with certain military officers, especially Major Meinel, who were not cooperating. Meinel was the army officer in charge of POWs for Munich and its surrounding areas. The Gestapo had been "screening" Soviet POWs in Stalag VII A Moosburg, and then shipping the "screened out" people to Dachau where they were murdered. Meinel discovered the murders were going on, and refused to follow orders to send several hundred of the remaining "screened out" Soviets to Dachau. He also complained to his superiors in the military about what was happening. "Screened out" people included anyone who was Jewish, any officers, believers in communism, incurably sick people, etc., but the Gestapo told Meinel their methods of screening were not his business.

Eberstein became involved. In the book "Nazi Conspiracy and Aggression", several telex / telegrams between the various offices involved have been translated and reproduced. These telegrams state that von Eberstein telephoned the Reich Security Main Office or Reichssicherheitshauptamt (RSHA) and told them that it was "intolerable" for Meinel to stay in his position, and it would cause problems with the relationship between the military and the SS. He told the RSHA to ask the military's German High Command (OKW) to have Meinel transferred to another position. After a few meetings, this is what concurred. The OKW decreed that the POWs that Meinel had temporarily saved would be surrendered to the Gestapo and then sent to Buchenwald. Meinel was later sent to Lithuania.

== Dismissal from posts ==
Karl von Eberstein was dismissed from all posts on 20 April 1945 for "defeatism", by Gauleiter Paul Giesler, on orders from Martin Bormann. The charge of "defeatism" was made because he refused to support orders from the high command that prisoners held in camps within his administrative command be killed. Eberstein was arrested by American forces on 8 May 1945 and held until October 1948 in several internment camps including, for a time, Dachau.

== Nuremberg testimony ==
Eberstein was a witness at the Nuremberg Trials. He was interviewed by Horst Pelckmann, counsel for the SS, and Major F Elwyn Jones, junior counsel for the United Kingdom. In his testimony, Eberstein gave organizational and historical information about the SS, the SA, their relationship with the German nobility, the Nazi Party, the SD (Security Service) and the Gestapo (Secret State Police). Eberstein claimed that the SS was not, in the view of his peers, a criminal organization, it was not created for purposes of violence, did not participate in the invasion of Austria, that he knew nothing of SS participation in the invasions of France, Belgium, Russia, Poland and others. He also stated that "my men" in the Allgemeine-SS (general SS) did not mention atrocities when home from "front leave".

With regard to his personal place in the chain of command, Eberstein stated that as a Police President, he had control over 1700 men in the Schutzpolizei (Protection Police), Ordnungspolizei (Order Police), and Kriminalpolizei (Criminal Police). He claimed the "chiefs of police had nothing to do with the political police or the security service" (meaning the Gestapo, and the SD). It is unclear from this translation if he mentioned the Sicherheitspolizei (Security Police) or SiPo.

Eberstein also discussed his perspective on the Night of the Long Knives and Kristallnacht. In the latter, he claimed that he ordered his police to protect Jewish businesses, claiming, "We in the SS considered this action downright indecent", and blamed the events on a speech by Joseph Goebbels. However, given the telegrams Eberstein sent on that night, his claims cannot be seen as carrying any weight. He also briefly discussed the treatment of downed enemy pilots, per the Geneva Convention and Hague Rules on Land Warfare.

=== Denied involvement in Dachau concentration camp and the HSSPF ===
The Dachau concentration camp complex was only a few kilometers from Munich. The question arose in the trial as to Eberstein's knowledge of the camp, authority over it, and participation in its activities. Eberstein denied everything. He claimed that the Allgemeine-SS did not establish concentration camps, instead claiming that the State established them. Also, he claimed that the Higher SS and Police Leaders (HSSPF), and the leaders of the Allgemeine-SS had nothing to do with concentration camps. He claimed the camps were under an independent chain of command, blaming the RSHA, the Economic and Administrative Main Office of the SS (SS-WVHA), and its Amt D, Inspectorate of Concentration Camps.

Eberstein claimed to have given tours of Dachau concentration camp, on orders from Himmler, from 1936 onward. These tours included some Americans. Eberstein stated there was no reason to inspect the camps, and he had no right to do so; they appeared to be run sufficiently and during the war inmates looked "well fed". In Spring of 1944, Eberstein claimed he became aware of abhorrent medical experiments involving Sigmund Rascher and had Rascher arrested; he complained to Himmler as to the matter. Eberstein stated that Rascher was kept under arrest until 1945, but that he had no power over Rascher.

Eberstein stated that he had no authority over the camp commander, and didn't know about the numerous executions inside the camp. Eberstein claimed he had nothing to do with Adolf Eichmann, never saw him, that the SS troops in Dachau were separate from the rest of the SS, and "we met them only occasionally". He did admit that some members of the Allgemeine-SS became concentration camp guards.

In the fall of 1944 Himmler transferred to the Higher SS and Police Leaders the responsibility for safeguarding prisoner-of-war camps against mass escapes and against attempts from the outside to liberate prisoners. For this purpose, the Higher SS and Police Leaders were made senior commanders of the prisoners of war in their defense areas. According to international regulations regarding prisoners of war, police could not be used to guard prisoners of war, so the Higher SS and Police Leaders were taken over into the Waffen-SS and appointed generals of the Waffen-SS. - Eberstein's 1946 Nuremberg explanation for how he came to be in the Waffen-SS and to have some authority over POWs.

Eberstein claimed he had a dispute with Gauleiter Paul Giesler, after Giesler ordered him to kill prisoners should the Americans approach, and he refused. He stated the general SS mostly ceased to exist by the start of the war, and that the Gauleiters and "Reich Defense Commissioners" under Martin Bormann were to blame. He claimed to have no knowledge as to the Einsatzgruppen, Einsatzkommandos, and the Auschwitz concentration and extermination camp. Eberstein stated he was in Munich during the entire war, thought foreign newspaper reports of atrocities were "enemy propaganda", and said it was impossible to "penetrate into the secret sphere of these extermination camps". He blamed the mass deaths in the camps on typhus and Allied bombing of medicine factories.

== Denazification ==
The denazification of Germany included the classification of ex-Nazis into one of five categories. On 15 November 1948, Eberstein was classified by a German denazification court into class III (lesser offender) and ordered to forfeit 30 percent of his wealth. No additional jail time was ordered, because he was given credit for the three and half-years internment under the Allies. After some additional legal procedures, Eberstein was temporarily placed into a more serious category of class II (incriminated person). However, on 19 February 1953, he was finally classified in the less-serious category IV of Mitläufer, which can be roughly translated as "follower or sympathizer". Other criminal investigations of Eberstein were without consequences, including preliminary investigations in 1950 and 1961 by prosecuting authorities in Munich of charges that Eberstein had ordered or participated in the murders of prisoners of war.

== Timeline ==
- 1913 to 1914. University of Halle (Saale)
- 1914 August. Field Artillery Regiment 17
- 1915. Leutnant of reserves
- 1918–? no later than early 1920s. Freikorps in central Germany and Upper Silesia.
- 1920s. Studied banking
- 1928. Independent factory owner in Gotha
- 1930. SS-Sturmführer and Standarten-Adjutant
- 1930–1931. City council member, Gotha
- 1930 Jul – Jan 1931. Joined SA. On staff of Gausturms in Weimar.
- 1931 Feb 1. SA-Standartenführer
- 1931 Nov 15. SA-Oberführer
- 1931 Nov – 1932 Jul. Gau SA-Sturmführer for Munchen Oberbayern
- 1931 Nov 15 – 1932 Apr 13. SA Gausturm / Untergruppe München
- 1932 July 1 – 1933 Feb 19. Führer for SA Gruppe Hochland
- 1932 Sep 15. SA-Gruppenführer
- 1933 Feb. Leaves SA
- 1933 Feb 21 – 1933 Sept 9. SS-Gruppenführer, and Führer of SS-Abschnitt XVIII (HQ in Weimar)
- 1933 Mar 5. Elected to the Reichstag
- 1933 Nov 15 – 1934 May 1. Führer for SS-Oberabschnitt Mitte (Halle) with 10-15,000 men under command
- 1933.
  - Located in Weimar, Thuringia.
  - In Staatsrat in Thuringia.
  - Delegate to the Nazi Reichstag for the 8th 'session' (Wahlperiod)
- 1934 May 1 – 1936 Apr 1. Führer for SS-Oberabschnitt Elbe (which had absorbed Mitte)
- 1934 June 30. (Night of the Long Knives) - in Dresden
- 1934 Dec 15 to 1936 Mar 31. District Governor (Kreishauptmann), Dresden-Bautzen
- 1936. In Munich
- 1936 January 30. Becomes SS-Obergruppenführer
- 1936 April 1. Führer of SS-Oberabschnitt Süd. Police president of Munich
- 1938 Mar 12 to 1942 Dec 17. HSSPF 'Main' (Benno Martin was de facto HSSPF)
- 1938 Apr 12 to 1945 Apr 20. HSSPF 'Süd'
- 1938 Nov 9-10.
  - In chain of command for orders implementing (Kristallnacht).
  - Führer of SS-Oberabschnitt Süd
  - Police President of Munich
- 1939 Jun – Jul. Ill
- 1941 Apr 8. General der Polizei
- 1942 Oct – 1945 Apr. Worked in Bavarian State Ministry of the Interior
- 1944 Jul 1. General der Waffen-SS
- 1944 Nov. 1200 SS men left in his Oberabschnitt, none available for SS work
- 1945 early Feb. Dismissed, replaced by Vogler as temporary substitute for HSSPF and Oberabschnitt Führer Süd
- 1945 Apr 20. Relieved of all posts for 'defeatism'
- 1946 August 3 & 5. Nuremberg Trial witness, by which time he had been under arrest for 15 months
- 1979 Feb 10. Died in Tegernsee, Bavaria.

== Awards and decorations ==
- Iron Cross of 1914, 1st and 2nd class
- Golden Party Badge
- War Merit Cross 1st and 2nd class with swords
- Sword of honour of the Reichsführer-SS
- NSDAP Long Service Award in silver and bronze
- SS Long Service Award
- Grand Cross of the Order of the Roman Eagle with swords (Italy)

== Bibliography ==
=== Books ===
English

- Family Association of von Eberstein, descending from the Rhön. Family News, February 1958. Heiligenholz, Bavaria, Germany. (Translation of Geschlechtsverband derer von Eberstein stammend von der Rhön).
- Ailsby, Christopher (1997). SS: Roll of Infamy. Motorbooks Intl. ISBN 0760304092.
- Campbell, Bruce (2004). The SA Generals and the Rise of Nazism. University Press of Kentucky. ISBN 978-0-8131-9098-3.
- International Military Tribunal at Nurnberg (c. 1947). Nazi Conspiracy and Aggression. USGPO.
- MacDonald, Callum (1989). The Killing of Reinhard Heydrich: The SS 'Butcher of Prague'. New York: Da Capo Press. ISBN 978-0-306-80860-9.
- Manvell, Roger; Fraenkel, Heinrich (2007) [1965]. Heinrich Himmler: The Sinister Life of the Head of the SS and Gestapo. London; New York: Greenhill; Skyhorse. ISBN 978-1-60239-178-9.
- McNab, Chris (2009). The SS: 1923–1945. London: Amber Books. ISBN 978-1-906626-49-5.
- Miller, Michael D.; Schulz, Andreas (2015). Leaders of the Storm Troops. Vol. 1. Solihull, England: Helion & Company. ISBN 978-1-909-98287-1.
- Petropoulos, Jonathan (2006). Royals and the Reich. Oxford University Press. ISBN 0-19-516133-5.
- Williams, Max (2001). Reinhard Heydrich: The Biography, Volume 1—Road To War. Church Stretton: Ulric Publishing. ISBN 978-0-9537577-5-6.
- Yerger, Mark C. (1997). Allgemeine-SS: The Commands, Units, and Leaders of the General SS. Atglen, PA: Schiffer Publishing Ltd. ISBN 0-7643-0145-4.

German

- Reichstag (May 1936). Der Deutsche Reichstag 1936 III Wahlperiode nach dem 30. January 1933 (in German). Berlin: R. b. Decker's Verlag, G Schenck. from "Die Reichstagsprotokolle 1919–1939". Digitale Bibliothek - Münchener Digitalisierungszentrum (MDZ) (in German). Bayerische StaatsBibliothek (Bavarian State Library). Archived from the original on 2008-12-09.
- Otto, Reinhard (1998). Wehrmacht, Gestapo und sowjetische Kriegsgefangene im deutschen Reichsgebiet 1941/42. Oldenbourg Wissenschaftsverlag. ISBN 3-486-64577-3.
- Streim, Alfred (1982). Sowjetische Gefangene in Hitlers Vernichtungskrieg. Berichte und Dokumente 1939–1945. Heidelberg: C. F. Müller Juristischer Verlag.. Pages 36–38, 45, 103-107. Excerpt at http://www.moosburg.org/info/stalag/meinel.html (translate.google.com used)
- Weiß, Hermann (Hg.) (1998). Biographisches Lexikon zum Dritten Reich. Frankfurt am Main: S. Fischer Verlag GmbH. ISBN 3-10-091052-4.

=== Web ===
- Beutel, SS Oberfuhrer (1938-11-10). "Dr. Munich No. 47 769: To the State Police of Augsburg, Nurnberg and Wurzburg. / Anti-Jewish Measures" (PDF). p. 25. Archived from the original (PDF) on July 19, 2011. From "Donovan Nuremberg Trial Collection, Vol 1, Subdivision: The Case Against the Nazi Secret Police, Security and Intelligence System and Ernst Kaltenbrunner". Cornell University Law School Library. Archived from the original on July 19, 2011.
- Eberstein, Karl Friedrich Freiherr von (1938-11-10). "Munich 47 768: To State Police Hq Augsburg, Nurnberg, et al. / Anti-Jewish Measures" (PDF). pp. 23, 24. Archived from the original (PDF) on July 19, 2011. From "Donovan Nuremberg Trial Collection, Vol 1, Subdivision: The Case Against the Nazi Secret Police, Security and Intelligence System and Ernst Kaltenbrunner". Cornell University Law School Library. Archived from the original on July 19, 2011.
- Evans, Richard J. "David Irving, Hitler and Holocaust Denial: Electronic Edition 4.3.c.ii.d. Manipulation of Evidence: the Eberstein Testimony". Holocaust Denial on Trial. Irving v Lipstadt. Defense Documents. Emory University, Beck Center & Addison Wesley & Davenport Lyons Solicitors, London, 1999. Archived from the original on July 17, 2007.
- German Bundestag. "Roots of parliamentarianism". Archived from the original on 2009-02-10.
- Gray, Charles. "Irving v. Lipstadt Judgment. (Electronic Edition)". Holocaust Denial on Trial. Emory University. Archived from the original on July 20, 2011.
- Hoser, Paul. "Sturmabteilung (SA), 1921–1923/1925–1945". Historisches Lexikon Bayerns (Historical Dictionary of Bavaria). Bayerischen Staatsbibliothek (Bavarian State Library).
- "Irving vs. Lipstadt Judgment, Part XIII". The Nizkor Project. Archived from the original on 2008-12-25.

=== Web - Nuremberg Trial proceedings ===
- International Military Tribunal, Trial of the Major War Criminals. "Nuremberg Trial Proceedings Volume 1, Individual Defendants and Defense Counsel". Avalon Project, Lillian Goldman Law Library, Yale Law School. Also William S. Hein & Co. Inc.
- International Military Tribunal, Trial of the Major War Criminals. "Nuremberg Trial Proceedings Volume 1, Prosecution Counsel". Avalon Project, Lillian Goldman Law Library, Yale Law School. Also William S. Hein & Co. Inc.
- International Military Tribunal, Trial of the Major War Criminals (3 Aug 1946). "Nuremberg Trial Proceedings Volume 20, Day 194". Avalon Project, Lillian Goldman Law Library, Yale Law School. Also William S. Hein & Co. Inc.
- International Military Tribunal, Trial of the Major War Criminals (5 Aug 1946). "Nuremberg Trial Proceedings Volume 20, Day 195". Avalon Project, Lillian Goldman Law Library, Yale Law School. Also William S. Hein & Co. Inc.
