= Military Merit Order (Bavaria) =

Military Merit Order Bayerischer Militär-Verdienstorden
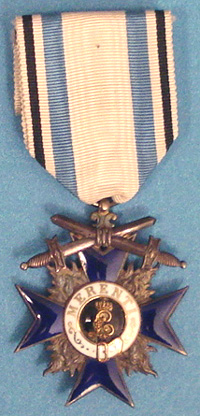
- Military Merit Order 4th Class with Swords
- Type: military order
- Awarded for: Bravery or military merit
- Description: Blue-enameled Maltese cross with an enameled center medallion; can be awarded with and without swords and came in several classes
- Country: (Kingdom of Bavaria) Bavaria
- Presented by: the Kingdom of Bavaria
- Eligibility: Military officers and officials, and in certain cases civilians
- Status: Obsolete
- Established: 19 July 1866

Precedence
- Next (higher): Bavarian Maximilian Order for Science and Art
- Next (lower): Ludwig Order
- Related: Prussian Iron Cross, Saxon Albert Order, Württemberg Friedrich Order with Swords, Baden Order of the Zähringer Lion with Swords

The Bavarian Military Merit Order (German: Militär-Verdienstorden) was established on 19 July 1866 by King Ludwig II of Bavaria. It was the kingdom's main decoration for bravery and military merit for officers and higher-ranking officials. Civilians acting in support of the army were also made eligible for the decoration. The Military Merit Order ranked below the Military Order of Max Joseph (Militär-Max-Joseph-Orden), which was Bavaria's highest military honor for officers (and conferred a patent of non-hereditary nobility on officers who were not already nobles).

== Description and Wear ==
The design of the order was a Maltese cross of blue enamel with a center medallion. Between the arms of most classes (and all classes after 1905) were golden flames (silver flames for the 4th Class after the 1905 revisions of the order). The obverse of the center medallion had a gold crowned "L" cipher (for the founder King Ludwig II) on the black-enameled center and the word "MERENTI" on a ring of white enamel edged in gold (later silver-gilt). The reverse had a gold Bavarian lion on black enamel with the date of founding, "1866", on the white-enameled ring (the Officer's Cross, a class created in 1900, had a plain flat reverse). Most of the various classes of the order were of different sizes and worn differently, as sash badges over the shoulder, as neck badges, or as breast badges suspended from a ribbon. The Officer's Cross was a pinback cross worn on the lower left chest, as were the breast stars associated with various classes.

== Classes ==
By World War I (after a wholesale revision of the order statutes in 1905), the order had evolved into the following classes:

- Grand Cross (Großkreuz) - Cross worn from a sash with a breast star
- 1st Class (1. Klasse) - Smaller cross worn from a sash with a breast star
- 2nd Class (2. Klasse) - Smaller cross worn from a ribbon around the neck
- Officer's Cross (Offizierskreuz) - Pinback cross worn on the lower left chest; the cross had an elongated lower arm.
- 3rd Class (3. Klasse) - Smaller cross worn from a ribbon on the upper left chest.
- 4th Class (4. Klasse) - Same cross as the 3rd Class, except with silver flames and, where applicable, crown and swords

The order could be awarded with or without swords (which generally indicated wartime or combat awards). The Grand Cross and 1st Class always came with a breast star, but the 2nd Class could be awarded with or without the breast star. The 3rd and 4th Classes could be awarded with or without a crown. Generally, these distinctions were based on rank, but in certain cases were used to permit a second award for further acts of bravery or military merit. During World War I, the order was typically awarded as follows:

- Grand Cross with Swords (Großkreuz mit Schwertern) - Field marshals, colonel generals, generals
- 1st Class with Swords (1. Klasse mit Schwertern) - Generals, some lieutenant generals
- 2nd Class with Star and with Swords (2. Klasse mit dem Stern und mit Schwertern) - Lieutenant generals, major generals who already had the 2nd Class with Swords
- 2nd Class with Swords (2. Klasse mit Schwertern) - Major generals
- Officer's Cross with Swords (Offizierskreuz mit Schwertern) - Colonels, some lieutenant colonels
- 3rd Class with Crown and Swords (3. Klasse mit der Krone und mit Schwertern) - Colonels, lieutenant colonels
- 3rd Class with Swords (3. Klasse mit Schwertern) - Lieutenant colonels, majors
- 4th Class with Crown and Swords (4. Klasse mit der Krone und mit Schwertern) - Majors, captains (and a few lieutenants) who already had the 4th Class with Swords
- 4th Class with Swords (4. Klasse mit Schwertern) - Captains, lieutenants

In addition, there was an associated Military Merit Cross, which was open to non-commissioned officers and enlisted soldiers.

== Notable recipients ==
- Luitpold, Prince Regent of Bavaria - Received the Grand Cross in the Austro-Prussian War of 1866.
- King Ludwig III of Bavaria - Received the Knight's Cross 1st Class (after 1905 the 3rd Class) as a lieutenant in the Austro-Prussian War.
- Leopold, Prince of Bavaria - Field marshal in World War I; received the Knight 2nd Class with Swords (after 1905 the 4th Class) in the Austro-Prussian War; prewar recipient of the Grand Cross, he received Swords to the Grand Cross in 1917.
- Rupprecht, Crown Prince of Bavaria - Field marshal in World War I; prewar recipient of the Grand Cross, he received Swords to the Grand Cross in 1917.
- Martin Chales de Beaulieu - Prussian general; received 3rd Class with Swords
- Friedrich von Beck-Rzikowsky - Austrian field marshal, chief of the general staff of the Imperial and Royal Army of Austria-Hungary, received Grand Cross
- Otto von Below - Prussian general; received 1st Class with Swords in 1915
- Karl Bodenschatz - Adjutant to Manfred von Richthofen in World War I, liaison officer between Hermann Goering and Adolf Hitler as Luftwaffe General in World War II, received 4th Class with Swords.
- Max von Boehn - Bavarian General of Infantry; received the 1st Class with Swords in 1917.
- Leopold Damian - Bavarian officer, later SA-Obergruppenführer and Chief, Supreme SA Court; received the 4th Class with Swords in World War I.
- Jakob Ritter von Danner - Bavarian officer; received a 4th Class with Swords for the Boxer Rebellion, and the 3rd Class with Swords, 3rd Class with Crown and Swords, and Officer's Cross with Swords in World War I.
- Franz Ritter von Epp - Bavarian officer; later a Generalleutnant in the Reichswehr, the Reichsstatthalter of Bavaria and an SA-Obergruppenführer; received the 4th and 3rd Class with Swords and, lasty, the Officer's Cross with Swords in February 1916.
- Max von Fabeck - Prussian General
- Erich von Falkenhayn - Prussian general and Chief of the General Staff; received the 1st Class with Swords in 1914 and the Grand Cross with Swords in 1915.
- Johann Baptist Fuchs - Bavarian officer, later a senior police official and SA general; received the 4th Class with Swords in 1914 and the 4th Class with Crown and Swords in 1918.
- Robert Ritter von Greim - Bavarian pilot, later Luftwaffe field marshal in World War II; received the 4th Class with Swords in 1915 and the 4th Class with Crown and Swords in 1917.
- Wilhelm Groener - Prussian officer, Defense Minister of Germany 1928–32; received the Officer's Cross with Swords in 1914.
- Franz Halder - Bavarian officer, later Chief of the German General Staff in World War II; received the 4th Class with Swords and the 4th Class with Crown and Swords in World War I.
- Kurt von Hammerstein-Equord - Later Chief of the Army Leadership (Heeresleitung), the Weimar Republic equivalent of Commander of the Army; received the 4th Class with Swords in World War I.
- Friedrich Haselmayr - Bavarian Army officer in World War I, later a German Army Generalleutnant and SA-Obergruppenführer; received the 4th class with Crown and Swords.
- Paul Hausser - Prussian officer and later SS-Oberst-Gruppenführer und Generaloberst der Waffen-SS in World War II; received the 4th Class with Crown and Swords in 1914.
- Franz Ritter von Hipper - Bavarian-born German admiral; received the 2nd Class with Star and Swords in 1915.
- Hermann Höfle - Bavarian Army officer, later an NSKK- and SS-Obergruppenführer; received the 4th Class with Swords in World War I.
- Max Hoffmann - Prussian officer and strategist in World War I; received the 3rd Class with Swords, 3rd Class with Crown and Swords, and Officer's Cross with Swords over a period of six months in 1916.
- Hans Georg Hofmann - Bavarian officer in World War I, later SA-Obergruppenführer; received the 4th Class with Crown and Swords.
- Max Immelmann - German ace pilot; received the 4th Class with Swords in World War I.
- Max Jüttner - Bavarian Hauptmann, later SA-Obergruppenführer and SA-Stabsführer; received the 4th Class with Swords in 1918.
- Emil Ketterer - Olympic athlete; Bavarian medical officer in World War I and later an SA-Obergruppenführer; received the 4th Class with Swords.
- Fritz Ritter von Kraußer - Bavarian officer, later SA-Obergruppenführer; received the 4th Class with Crown and Swords in World War I.
- Friedrich Freiherr Kress von Kressenstein - Bavarian general and commander of Ottoman forces in World War I; received the 3rd Class with Crown and Swords in 1915 and the Officer's Cross with Swords in 1916.
- Wilhelm Ritter von Leeb - Bavarian officer, later Field Marshal in World War II; received the 4th Class with Swords in 1914, the 4th Class with Crown and Swords in 1916, and the 3rd Class with Swords in 1917.
- Leo Levy - German merchant from the Jewish Levy family, a doctor of chemistry, and a soldier in Wilhelm II's Imperial Army during World War I; received the 2nd Class with Crown in World War I.
- Willy Liebel - Bavarian officer, later Oberbürgermeister of Nuremberg and SA-Obergruppenführer; received the 4th Class with Swords in World War I.
- Fritz von Lossberg - Prussian officer and strategist; received the 3rd Class with Crown and Swords in 1914.
- August von Mackensen - Prussian general, later field marshal; received the Grand Cross with Swords in 1915
- Ernst Röhm - Bavarian officer, later SA-Stabschef; received the 4th Class with Swords in 1914, the 4th Class with Crown and Swords in 1920.
- Gerd von Rundstedt - Prussian officer and later Field Marshal in World War II; received the 4th Class with Crown and Swords in World War I.
- Hans von Seeckt - Prussian officer and later Chief of the Heeresleitung; received the 2nd Class with Swords in 1915 and the Star to the 2nd Class in 1916.
- Wilhelm Ritter von Thoma - Bavarian officer and later World War II general; received the 4th Class with Swords in World War I.

== See also ==
- Military Merit Cross (Bavaria)
