= Paul Giesler =

German Nazi politician and SA general (1895–1945)

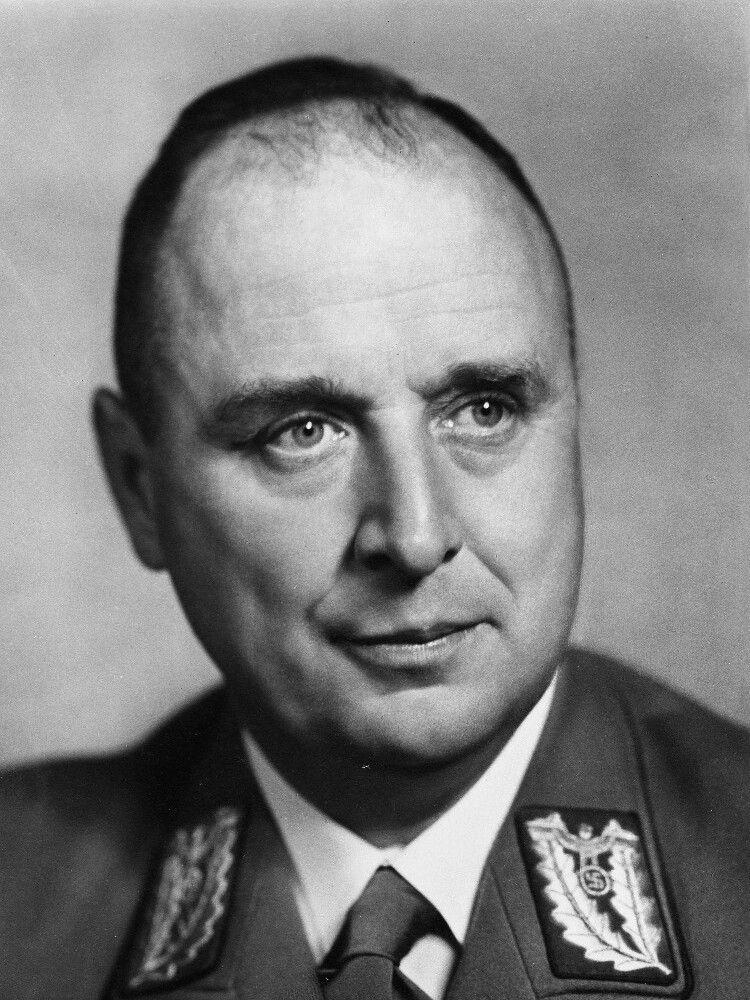
- Giesler in 1943

Gauleiter of Gau Westphalia-South
- In office 9 November 1941 – 26 January 1943
- Preceded by: Josef Wagner
- Succeeded by: Albert Hoffmann

Gauleiter of Gau Munich-Upper Bavaria
- In office 23 June 1942 – 8 May 1945
- Preceded by: Adolf Wagner
- Succeeded by: Position abolished

Ministerpräsident of Bavaria
- In office 2 November 1942 – 28 April 1945
- Preceded by: Ludwig Siebert
- Succeeded by: Fritz Schäffer

Reichsminister of the Interior
- In office 30 April 1945 – 3 May 1945
- Appointed by: Adolf Hitler
- President: Karl Dönitz
- Chancellor: Joseph Goebbels
- Preceded by: Heinrich Himmler
- Succeeded by: Wilhelm Stuckart

Personal details
- Born: Paul Heinrich Hermann Giesler; 15 June 1895 Siegen, Province of Westphalia, Kingdom of Prussia, German Empire
- Died: 8 May 1945 (aged 49) Stanggaß, Bavaria, Nazi Germany
- Cause of death: Suicide
- Party: Nazi Party
- Relatives: Hermann Giesler (brother)
- Education: Darmstadt University of Applied Sciences; Technische Universität Darmstadt
- Profession: Architect
- Civilian awards: Golden Party Badge; Brunswick Rally Badge

Military service
- Allegiance: German Empire; Nazi Germany
- Branch/service: Royal Prussian Army; German Army
- Years of service: 1914–1918; 1939–1940
- Rank: Leutnant of reserves Hauptmann of reserves
- Unit: 1st Foot Guards Regiment; 2nd Foot Guards Regiment
- Battles/wars: World War I World War II
- Military awards: Iron Cross 1st and 2nd class Clasp to the Iron Cross 2nd Class; War Merit Cross, 1st and 2nd class Wound Badge

Paul Giesler (15 June 1895 – 8 May 1945) was a German Nazi Party politician and SA-Obergruppenführer. From 1941, he was the Gauleiter of Westphalia-South, and he was appointed to the same position for the Gau Munich-Upper Bavaria in 1942. From 2 November 1942 to 28 April 1945, he was also Ministerpräsident of Bavaria. He was responsible for multiple acts of brutality, which included killing opponents of the regime in southern Germany. Giesler was also named in Hitler's Political Testament as Interior Minister, replacing Heinrich Himmler, in the short-lived Goebbels Cabinet. He committed suicide together with his wife in the closing days of the war in Europe.

== Early life ==
Paul Giesler was born in Siegen, the son of an architect. His younger brother, Hermann Giesler (1898–1987), was also an architect who, along with Albert Speer, gained the favor of Adolf Hitler in Nazi Germany. Paul attended Volksschule and Realgymnasium in Siegen until 1914. On the outbreak of the First World War, he enlisted in the Royal Prussian Army and was assigned to a pioneer battalion of the 1st Foot Guards Regiment. Attaining the rank of Leutnant of reserves, he served as a platoon and company commander of a land mine unit. Transferred to the 2nd Guards Regiment in 1918, he was wounded several times and was awarded the Iron Cross 1st and 2nd class. Discharged from military service at the war's end, he joined the right-wing paramilitary veterans' organization, Der Stahlhelm. He studied architecture at the Darmstadt University of Applied Sciences and the Technische Universität Darmstadt until 1921, and became a self-employed architect in Siegen between 1922 and 1933. He also was a member of the paramilitary Young German Order from 1920 and joined the conservative German National People's Party. From 1925 to 1927, he was the district leader (Bezirksführer) of the Siegen war veteran's association (Kriegerverein).

== SA and political career ==
Giesler first joined the Nazi Party in 1922, co-founded the SA in Siegen that same year and became a Party speaker in 1924, when the Party was banned in the aftermath of the Beer Hall Putsch. He re-enrolled on 1 January 1928 (membership number 72,741), became an Ortsgruppenleiter (local group leader) in 1929 and rejoined the SA in January 1931 with the rank of SA-Sturmbannführer. As an early Party member, he was considered an Alter Kämpfer and was later awarded the Golden Party Badge. For the next few years, he advanced through the ranks in multiple SA leadership posts, as a battalion leader in SA-Standarte 132 in Hagen until September 1932; the commander of Standarte 130 in Siegen until September 1933; the leader of SA-Brigade 68 in Siegen until March 1934; and, lastly, as the commander of SA-Gruppe Westphalia with headquarters in Dortmund. Throughout this time, Giesler organized and personally participated in brutal attacks on enemies of the Party, including Communists, Social Democrats and trade unionists. He instigated and carried out violent riots leading up to and following the Nazi seizure of power in January 1933. On 2 May 1933, his units participated in the attack on and destruction of the Siegen offices of the General German Trade Union Federation, when the Nazis suppressed and outlawed the German labor unions. Giesler was promoted to the rank of SA-Brigadeführer on 20 April 1934.

However, during the Night of the Long Knives at the end of June 1934, due to being away on holiday, Giesler only narrowly escaped being arrested, and perhaps murdered, a fate that befell many other SA leaders. He was removed from his post as SA commander in Westphalia, and was assigned to a staff position in the SA central command. Brought before the Supreme Party Court by Josef Wagner, Gauleiter of Gau Westphalia-South, on charges of planning an armed rebellion, Giesler was acquitted on the basis of insufficient evidence in April 1935. The next month, he was given command of SA-Brigade 63 in Oldenburg-Ostfriesland. This was followed in September 1936 by a stint as chief of staff to SA-Gruppe Hochland with headquarters in Munich. He remained there until June 1938 when, following the Anschluss, he was charged with organizing the SA in the newly-acquired Austrian territory and was named leader of the SA-Gruppe Alpenland in Linz, a post he would hold until September 1941.

During these years, Giesler also pursued a political career. Although he was defeated in the April 1932 election to the Prussian Landtag, he served a term on the Siegen City Council from April 1933 to April 1934. In November 1933, he was elected as a deputy to the Reichstag from electoral constituency 18 (Westphalia-South). He would serve until the fall of the Nazi regime, switching to constituency 14 (Weser-Ems) at the March 1936 and April 1938 elections, and returning to the Westphalia-South seat in March 1942.

When the Second World War began, Giesler volunteered for service with the army and participated in the Polish and French campaigns. With the rank of Hauptmann, he was an infantry company commander, was wounded in France and was awarded the Clasp to the Iron Cross, 2nd class.

== Gauleiter in Westphalia and Bavaria ==
In August 1941, at the instigation of Martin Bormann, the chief of the Party Chancellery, Giesler returned to duties as a Party administrator. He was assigned to the Party Chancellery at the Brown House, with the rank of Deputy Gauleiter, to train for a higher administrative posting. Due to his full-time Party work, he left active service with the SA in September 1941, retaining a reserve position with the SA-Gruppe Alpenland. On 9 November 1941, on Bormann's recommendation, Giesler replaced his old adversary Josef Wagner who was removed as the Gauleiter of Westphalia-South. At the same time, Prussian Ministerpräsident Hermann Göring appointed him to the Prussian State Council.

On 23 June 1942, Giesler was made Acting Gauleiter of Munich-Upper Bavaria during Adolf Wagner's illness. He also replaced Wagner as Acting Minister of the Interior and Minister of Education and Culture. Retaining his position in Westphalia-South, Giesler was in command of two Gaue until he turned over the Westphalia position to Albert Hoffmann on 26 January 1943. After Ludwig Siebert's death on 1 November 1942, Giesler succeeded him as both Acting Ministerpräsident and Acting Minister of Finance and Economics of Bavaria. On 16 November 1942, he was appointed the Reich Defense Commissioner for both his Gaue. On 30 January 1943, he was promoted to SA-Obergruppenführer. When Wagner died on 12 April 1944, Giesler was made permanent in all his Party and government posts in Munich. On 25 September 1944, he additionally was made the commander of the Nazi militia forces, the Volkssturm, in his Gau. Giesler, an unquestioning follower of Hitler, ruled Bavaria with ruthless efficiency and almost unlimited power in the last years of the war.

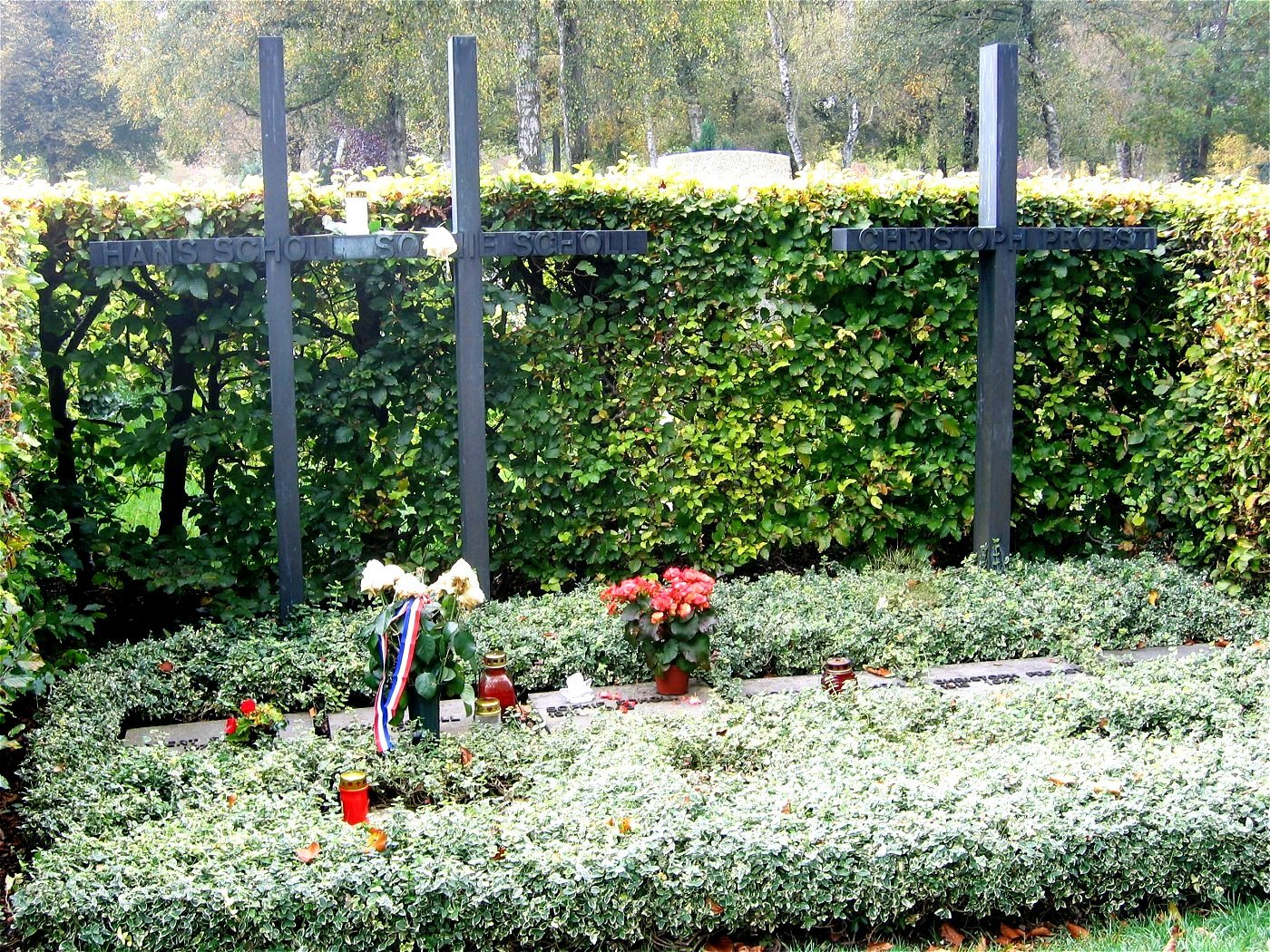
The graves of Hans Scholl, Sophie Scholl and Christoph Probst, White Rose student resistance leaders murdered by the Nazis on 22 February 1943

On 13 January 1943, Giesler gave a speech commemorating the 470th anniversary of the founding of the Ludwig-Maximilians-Universität München. In the audience was Sophie Scholl, a member of the White Rose student resistance movement. Giesler criticized the male students who had not been called up for military service and said that suitable employment contributing to the war effort would be found for them. He was particularly scornful and insulting to the female students, stating that they should be delivering babies for the Führer instead of taking up spaces in the university. For those not attractive enough to find a mate, he said, he would assign one of his adjutants to undertake this task, guaranteeing a "pleasurable experience". This caused an uproar by the students, many of whom tried to leave the hall, resulting in a fierce scuffle with the police. This was followed by a public anti-Nazi student demonstration on the streets of Munich, the first in Nazi Germany. The speech contributed to the students' decision to produce their sixth and last pamphlet denouncing the Nazi regime on 18 February. After the capture of Sophie and the other White Rose ringleaders, including Hans Scholl and Christoph Probst, Giesler advocated the utmost punishment, including public execution. The students were hastily tried and convicted before the President of the People's Court, Roland Freisler, on 22 February and were sent to the guillotine the same day.

== Repressive actions towards the end of the Second World War ==
As American troops approached Munich, Giesler was reported to be planning the murder of the surviving inmates at Dachau concentration camp and several of its satellite camps in March 1945, on the authority of SS-Obergruppenführer Ernst Kaltenbrunner, Chief of the RSHA. In a 20 November 1945 interrogation of Giesler's Gaustabsamtsleiter, Hubertus "Bertus" Gerdes, by Special Agent Johannes Imhoff of the Counter Intelligence Corps (CIC), Nürnberg Sub-Regional Office, Gerdes spoke of his role in sabotaging the plans for mass murder. In August 1946, former SS-Obergruppenführer Karl von Eberstein, the SS and Police Leader in Munich, testified to the International Military Tribunal that he was ordered by Giesler to use his influence with the commandant of Dachau (SS-Obersturmbannführer Eduard Weiter) to have 25,000 prisoners shot when the U.S. Army approached. If this couldn't be done, then Giesler, in his capacity as a Reich Defense Commissioner, would order the Luftwaffe to bomb the camp. Eberstein refused to order the shooting of the prisoners and stated that it would be impossible to find any Luftwaffe commander that would give the order to bomb. Giesler then said he would poison the prisoners. Eberstein claimed he stopped Giesler by obtaining an order from Reichsführer-SS Heinrich Himmler to simply surrender the camps. Giesler then fired Eberstein for "defeatism" on 20 April, on orders from Bormann.

In April 1945, Giesler was appointed Reich Defense Commissioner-South and, in addition to his own Gau, was placed in charge of Gau Swabia, Reichsgau Salzburg, Reichsgau Upper Danube and Reichsgau Tirol-Vorarlberg. At this time, he authorized some of the worst of the violence directed against so-called "defeatists" and those seeking to surrender in order to avoid further pointless death and destruction. As the American troops approached Munich on 27 April, an uprising known as the Freiheitsaktion Bayern (Bavarian Freedom Action) broke out, led by Hauptmann Rupprecht Gerngroß who seized the radio station and called on troops to lay down their arms and arrest the Nazi leaders, and encouraged citizens to display white flags of surrender. Giesler took the lead in brutally quelling the revolt with help from the Gestapo and SS units. Although Gerngroß and others escaped, some 40 people were killed. In another infamous incident known as the Penzberger Mordnacht (Penzberg Murder Night), citizens of Penzberg, 50 kilometers south of Munich, led by the former Social Democratic mayor Hans Rummer, revolted to prevent the destruction of the local coal mine, a major employer in the region. Giesler, on the night of 28–29 April, ordered the hanging without trial of 16 men and women, one of whom was pregnant. Having repeatedly demonstrated his fanatical loyalty to the Nazi regime, Giesler was named to replace Himmler as the Reichsminister of the Interior in Adolf Hitler's political testament of 29 April 1945, though he never actually assumed this post. When it was reported to Giesler that three people had been shot in another incident in Burghausen he retorted: "What, only three?"

== Death ==
Accounts of Giesler's death vary, but the most widely accepted is that he fled Munich toward Berchtesgaden on 30 April 1945, together with his wife and mother-in-law, to avoid falling captive to American troops. On 2 May, Giesler shot his wife and himself, and his mother-in-law ingested poison. Giesler alone survived and was taken to a military hospital in Stanggaß where he succumbed to his wounds on 8 May 1945. A local physician, named Gottschalk, certified Giesler's death on that date, and he was buried in the cemetery in nearby Berchtesgaden on 10 May. His remains were later disinterred and reburied elsewhere.

== SA ranks ==
SA ranks
| Date | Rank |
|---|---|
| 15 September 1931 | SA-Sturmbannführer |
| 1 July 1932 | SA-Standartenführer |
| 15 November 1933 | SA-Oberführer |
| 20 April 1934 | SA-Brigadeführer |
| 9 November 1937 | SA-Gruppenführer |
| 30 January 1943 | SA-Obergruppenführer |

== Awards and decorations ==
The following were Giesler's military and civilian awards and decorations:

- 1914 Iron Cross 1st Class
- 1914 Iron Cross 2nd Class
- Clasp to the Iron Cross 2nd Class, October 1939
- 1918 Wound Badge
- 1939 Wound Badge in Silver, 1940
- War Merit Cross 1st Class without Swords
- War Merit Cross 2nd Class without Swords
- The Honour Cross of the World War 1914/1918 with Swords, c.1934
- Golden Party Badge, 1934
- 1931 Brunswick Rally Badge, c.1931
- Golden Hitler Youth Badge with Oakleaves
- Nazi Party Long Service Award in Silver
- Nazi Party Long Service Award in Bronze
- Honour Chevron for the Old Guard, February 1934

== Portrayal in film ==
- Reinhold K. Olszewski in Die Weiße Rose (1982)

== See also ==
- Dachau
- Penzberg
- White Rose

== Sources ==
- Bosl, Karl. (1983) Paul Giesler biography, Bosls Bayrische Biographie, Universitätsbibliothek Regensburg.
- International Military Tribunal, Trial of the Major War Criminals (1946): Nuremberg Trial Proceedings Volume 20, Day 195, 5 August 1946, Avalon Project, Lillian Goldman Law Library, Yale Law School.
- Kershaw, Ian (2011). The End: The Defiance and Destruction of Hitler's Germany, 1944-1945. Penguin Press. ISBN 978-1-594-20314-5.
- Miller, Michael D.; Schulz, Andreas (2012). Gauleiter: The Regional Leaders of the Nazi Party and Their Deputies, 1925-1945. Vol. I (Herbert Albrecht – H. Wilhelm Huttmann). R. James Bender Publishing. ISBN 978-1-932970-21-0.
- Miller, Michael (2015). Leaders Of The Storm Troops Volume 1. England: Helion & Company. ISBN 978-1-909982-87-1.
- Shirer, William (1960). The Rise and Fall of the Third Reich. New York: Simon and Schuster. ISBN 978-0-831-77404-2.
- Yerger, Mark C. (1997). Allgemeine-SS. The Commands, Units, and Leaders of the General SS. Atglen, PA: Schiffer Publishing Ltd. ISBN 0-7643-0145-4.
