= Rupprecht Gerngroß =

German lawyer

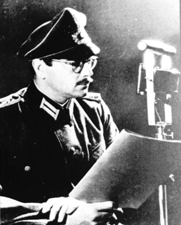
- Born: 21 June 1915; Shanghai, China
- Died: 25 February 1996 (aged 80); Munich, Bavaria, Germany
- Military career
- Allegiance: Germany
- Branch: German Army
- Rank: Captain
- Commands: Freiheitsaktion Bayern
- Conflicts: World War II; German resistance to Nazism

Rupprecht Gerngroß (21 June 1915 – 25 February 1996) was a German lawyer and leader of the Freiheitsaktion Bayern (FAB; English: Bavarian Freedom Action), a group involved in an attempt to overthrow the Nazis in Munich in April 1945.

== Early life and education ==
Rupprecht Gerngroß was born in Shanghai in 1915, to German parents originally from Munich. He returned with his family to Germany after World War I and was educated in Munich, Germany.

== Career ==
He served as a volunteer in the Wehrmacht during World War II and was promoted to officer and was wounded. Recovering in a hospital in Poland, he witnessed the execution of a group of Jews, an event which turned his opinion against the Nazis.

Upon his return, he was put in charge of an interpreter company in the Bavarian capital. Within this unit he found a group of people who were unconvinced of the Nazi ideals and ideas and he managed to arm his officially unarmed company. From 1942, this company formed the heart of the Freiheitsaktion Bayern, but it also involved a number of civilians. All up, the resistance movement had a strength of about 400 people. Jürgen Wittenstein, a friend of the members of the Weiße Rose, collected weapons for the movement from wounded soldiers at the Italian front, where he had volunteered to serve in order to escape the Gestapo.

During the war, he managed to complete his law degree at the University of Erlangen in 1942.

In the final days of the war, when the order was issued to defend Munich to the last man by blowing up all bridges and using the Munich trams to form barricades, he decided to resist this order to prevent a complete destruction of the infrastructure of the city.

=== Freiheitsaktion Bayern (FAB) ===
In the final days of World War II, Gerngroß was serving as a captain in an interpreter company in Munich. On the morning of 28 April 1945, he ordered the occupation of the radio transmitters in Schwabing-Freimann and Erding and he broadcast messages in multiple languages, encouraging soldiers to resist the Nazi regime. He proclaimed a hunt for the golden pheasants (German:Jagd auf die Goldfasane), this being a popular nickname for NSDAP officials due to the color of their uniforms, and encouraged people to display white flags from their homes as a sign of surrender. His group also occupied the Munich city hall and the headquarters of the Völkischer Beobachter and Münchner Neuesten Nachrichten, two newspapers vital to the Nazi propaganda. The claim that the Freiheitsaktion had taken control over Munich was however premature and led to other uprisings against the Nazis in the region, which were often brutally suppressed by the SS.

Gerngroß's attempt to stop further bloodshed was quickly crushed by the Nazi and SS units still loyal to the collapsing regime. Paul Giesler, Gauleiter of the Gau Munich-Upper Bavaria was personally involved in putting it down. While Gerngroß escaped into the mountains, many others of his movement did not and more than forty were executed hours before the liberation of the city.

While unsuccessful in liberating Munich that day, Gerngroß did save a number of lives through his action. The prisoners of the Dachau concentration camp were supposed to be sent on a death march south with their SS guards to be used as labourers in the Alpenfestung. His broadcast triggered an uprising in Dachau and the SS left in panic, abandoning the inmates who were liberated by the arriving US forces soon thereafter. He is also credited with saving the city of Munich from further destruction, and is therefore considered to be the leader of the only successful putsch against Hitler. His announcement of the end of the Nazis in Munich led many German soldiers to desert the lost cause and the US forces arriving in Munich on 30 April experienced virtually no resistance when taking the city.

In Götting (near Bad Aibling), the teacher Hangl and the priest Grimm decided to hoist the Bavarian flag at the steeple (instead of the swastika flag, called by the priest the "red hanky"; although urged by an officer to remove the flag, they didn't obey. An SS officer later that day arrested both, and they were shot shortly afterwards. On 2 May 1945 the village was liberated by US forces.

Franz Ritter von Epp, Reichskommissar of Bavaria, refused his support to the movement, contributing to its failure to succeed completely. Gerngroß had counted on his support.

=== Assassination attempts on Hitler ===
On two occasions, Gerngroß tried to assassinate Hitler.

=== After the war ===
In 1962, Gerngroß had a traditional Chinese vessel, a junk, built for him in Hong Kong. He named the boat Mau Yee ("Munich Freedom"; German Münchner Freiheit). For about 20 years, Gerngroß sailed the junk in the Mediterranean and Adriatic, where Mau Yee was supposedly the only vessel of its kind. He later returned to Munich and died there in 1996.

== Legacy ==
Gerngroß remains almost forgotten within the German resistance movement. In 1946, the Feilitzschplatz in the Munich suburb of Schwabing was renamed Münchner Freiheit (lit. 'Munich liberty') to commemorate the courageous attempt to free Munich from the Nazis in the last days of World War II.

While the Freiheitsaktion Bayern was a failure from a military point of view, it did prevent the further destruction of Munich and sped up the collapse of the Nazi regime in the city. The US occupation authorities acknowledged this fact by recognizing the FAB and asking the surviving members to support the Counterintelligence Corps (CIC) but the group declined.

Upon her death in 2001, his widow left a substantial amount of documents about the FAB, collected by Gerngroß, to the Bavarian state archives.
