= Fritz Ritter von Kraußer =

German Nazi SA general (1888–1934)

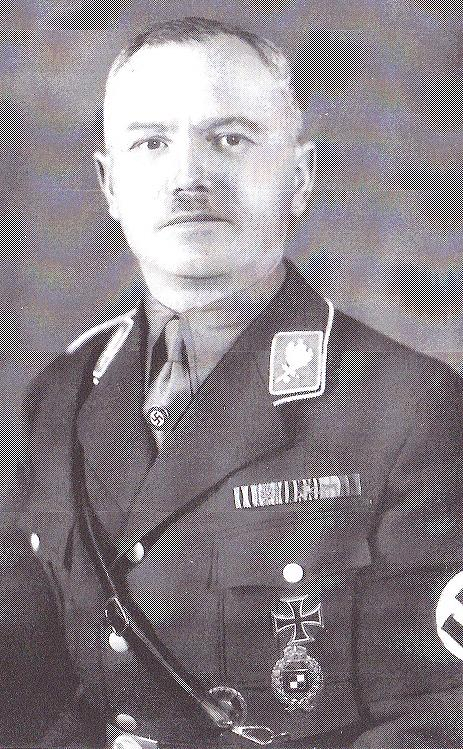
- Kraußer in 1931

Chief, Department I (Organization) Supreme SA Leadership (OSAF)
- In office 1 July 1932 – 30 June 1934
- Stabschef: Ernst Röhm

Führer, SA-Gruppe Hochland
- In office 3 November 1931 – 13 February 1932
- Stabschef: Ernst Röhm

Additional positions
- 1933–1934: Reichstag Deputy

Personal details
- Born: Friedrich Wilhelm Kraußer; 29 April 1888 Nuremberg, Kingdom of Bavaria, German Empire
- Died: 2 July 1934 (aged 46) Preußische Hauptkadettenanstalt, Lichterfelde, Nazi Germany
- Cause of death: Execution by firing squad
- Party: Nazi Party
- Profession: Military officer

Military service
- Allegiance: German Empire; Weimar Republic
- Branch/service: Royal Bavarian Army; Luftstreitkräfte; Freikorps; Reichswehr
- Years of service: 1906–1924
- Rank: Hauptmann
- Unit: 4th Royal Bavarian Infantry Regiment; Freikorps Epp; 46th Reichswehr Infantry Regiment; 21st Reichswehr Infantry Regiment
- Commands: Bavarian Aviation Squadron
- Battles/wars: World War I Bavarian Soviet Republic
- Awards: Iron Cross, 1st & 2nd class Knight's Cross, House Order of Hohenzollern; Knight's Cross, Military Order of Max Joseph; Bavaria Military Merit Order with crown and swords Knight's Cross, Order of the Württemberg Crown; Wound Badge

Fritz Ritter von Kraußer, born Friedrich Wilhelm Kraußer, (29 April 1888 – 2 July 1934) was a German military officer who was a highly decorated veteran of the First World War. He later became an SA-Obergruppenführer in the Sturmabteilung (SA), the Nazi Party's paramilitary organization. Kraußer was also a deputy of the Reichstag. He was murdered along with many other SA leaders in the Night of the Long Knives.

== Early life and military career ==
Kraußer, the son of a businessman, was born in Nuremberg. After graduating from the Gymnasium in Rothenburg ob der Tauber, he entered the Royal Bavarian Army at Munich as a Fahnenjunker (officer cadet) in 1906. In July 1908, he was assigned as a Fähnrich to the 4th Infantry Regiment "King Wilhelm of Württemberg" in Metz. After completing courses at the war college, he was commissioned as a Leutnant on 23 October 1910.

Kraußer participated in the First World War at the front lines on the western front. On 24 August 1914, only three weeks after the start of the war, he was seriously wounded while serving as the platoon leader of a machine gun company. In early 1915, he transferred to the Luftstreitkräfte (air force) as an aerial observer. In March 1915, he returned to the front with a Bavarian field aviation unit and, in 1917, he was appointed as the commander of an air squadron. In November 1917, Kraußer was seriously wounded for the second time. After his recovery, he returned to duty at the front with his squadron, where he remained until the Armistice of 11 November 1918.

For his leadership and bravery in battle, Kraußer was awarded multiple decorations for valor, including the Iron Cross, 1st and 2nd class, the Knight's Cross of the House Order of Hohenzollern, the Knight's Cross of the Military Order of Max Joseph (the highest military order of the Kingdom of Bavaria), the Bavaria Military Merit Order with crown and swords, and the Knight's Cross of the Order of the Württemberg Crown. He also was elevated to the nobility and was allowed to style himself Ritter von Kraußer.

== Life under the Weimar Republic ==
After the end of the war, Kraußer took part in the suppression of the Munich Soviet Republic in 1919 as a member of the Freikorps unit headed by fellow-Bavarian Franz Ritter von Epp. Kraußer organized the first aerial unit of this Freikorps in Gotha. In 1920, Kraußer was accepted into the army of the Weimar Republic, the Reichswehr, with the rank of Hauptmann. Initially assigned to Infantry Regiment 46, he was later transferred to Infantry Regiment 21 in Nuremberg. In March 1923, he was assigned to the staff of Wehrkreis (Military District) VII, headquartered in Munich.

In 1922, in Nuremberg, Kraußer joined the Wehrverband Reichsflagge (Imperial Flag Combat League), a paramilitary organization with a regional focus in Franconia. When the league split in October 1923, the more militant members under Ernst Röhm and Joseph Seydel formed the Bund Reichskriegsflagge (Imperial War Flag Federation). Krausser joined and participated as a member of the Bund in Adolf Hitler's Beer Hall Putsch on 9 November 1923. This led to his dismissal from the Reichswehr on 14 February 1924.

In civilian life, Kraußer worked as a businessman and was at the same time a member of other military associations. When the SA was banned in the aftermath of the Beer Hall Putsch, Röhm founded the Frontbann, a front organization for the SA, which he eventually built up to a force of 30,000. Kraußer joined the new organization. From August 1924 to 1925 he was a member of its high command staff and commanded the Frontbann forces in Munich. In connection with his Frontbann activities, Krausser was arrested in September 1924 and charged with violating the Law for the Protection of the Republic, but was released after just six weeks in custody.

From 1926 to June 1928, Kraußer also led the Munich branch of the paramilitary association Altreichsflagge (Old Imperial Flag) that was founded and led by former General Erich Ludendorff, a Nazi supporter. This association had split off from the Wehrverband Reichsflagge in 1923. Kraußer also belonged to the Deutsch-Völkischen Offiziersbund (German-Völkisch Officers' Federation) and the Tannenbergbund (Tannenberg Federation). Because of these memberships, Kraußer at this time did not obtain admission to the Nazi Party, which did not permit members to belong to other political associations.

== Career in the Nazi Sturmabteilung (SA) ==
Kraußer joined the Nazi Party in late 1928 (membership number 104,846). When Ernst Röhm became the SA-Stabschef in 1931, he set about recruiting other former Bavarian military officers that he knew and trusted for top level positions, and Kraußer was one such selection. Kraußer entered the SA with the relatively high rank of SA-Oberführer and, from 3 November 1931 to 13 February 1932, he led the SA-Gruppe Hochland in Munich, in command of all SA forces in Upper Bavaria. Promoted to SA-Gruppenführer on 15 March 1932, he was chief of Department I (Organization) of the Supreme SA Leadership (OSAF) from 1 July 1932. Part of his function was as chief of aviation, responsible for the air arms of both the SA and its subordinate component, the Schutzstaffel (SS).

After the Nazi seizure of power, Kraußer served from 1 May to 31 December 1933 as the SA Special Representative to the commander of the auxiliary security police in Bavaria. He gave up his portfolio for aviation on 15 May 1933 with the formation of the German Air Sports Association. He was promoted to SA-Obergruppenführer on 27 June 1933. Kraußer also engaged in electoral politics and, at the November 1933 parliamentary election, he was elected to the Reichstag for electoral constituency 10 (Magdeburg), where he served until his death.

=== SA ranks ===
SA ranks
Date	Rank
15 November 1931	SA-Oberführer
15 March 1932	SA-Gruppenführer
27 June 1933	SA-Obergruppenführer

== Arrest and death ==
Alarmed by the growing size and power of the SA, and seeking to alleviate similar concerns on the part of the German military high command, Hitler, now the Reich Chancellor, decided to launch a purge against Röhm and his inner circle in an operation that became known as the Night of the Long Knives. The SA leaders were gathered for a meeting at the Bavarian spa town of Bad Wiessee on 30 June 1934. When Kraußer arrived in Munich that morning on the overnight train from Berlin, he was arrested by two plainclothes policemen and taken to Stadelheim Prison. At one point, Hitler stated that he would pardon Kraußer in deference to his highly decorated war service. However, later that same day, Kraußer was flown from Munich to Berlin, together with SA-Gruppenführer Georg von Detten and Karl Schreyer and SA-Oberführer Hans-Joachim von Falkenhausen. There he was briefly held with the other three SA leaders in the Columbia concentration camp at Tempelhofer Feld. They were informed that they had been sentenced to death for high treason and would be executed. In the early morning of 2 July 1934, Kraußer was taken to the grounds of the Preußische Hauptkadettenanstalt (Prussian Main Cadet Academy) that was the headquarters of the Leibstandarte SS Adolf Hitler and shot at about 3:00 a.m. by a firing squad composed of Leibstandarte members. He was one of at least sixteen individuals murdered in that location between 30 June and 2 July.
