= Kompanieführer =

German paramilitary title

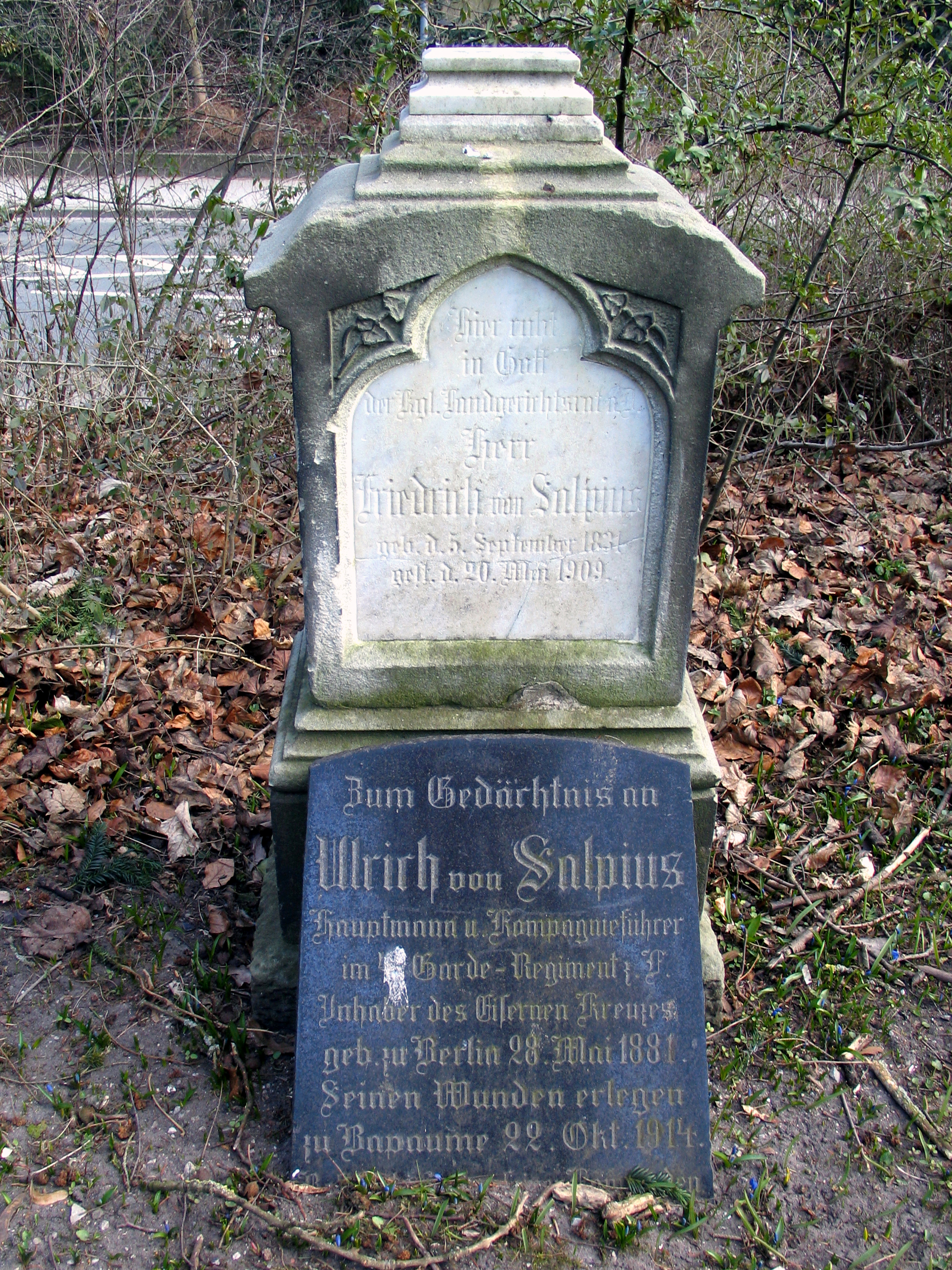
Grave of Ulrich von Salpius (1881–1914), described as "Hauptmann [and] Kompagnieführer" [sic]. He died of wounds at Bapaume in October 1914, early in the First World War.

Kompanieführer ("company leader") is a German paramilitary title that has existed since the First World War. Originally, the title of Kompanieführer was held by the officer commanding an infantry company (most often a Hauptmann or Oberleutnant. After the close of World War I, the title became the first of several officer ranks in the Freikorps.

The last usage of Kompanieführer, as a paramilitary title, was in 1944 and 1945 when the position was held by company commanders of Volkssturm units. Due to the title's use of the word "Führer", the title of Kompanieführer is no longer employed in the modern day military of Germany. Today the title is sometimes used by Schützenvereine (shooting societies).
