= Upper Bavaria–Swabia =

Former constituency of the Reichstag (Weimar Republic)

24 Upper Bavaria–Swabia Oberbayern–Schwaben
- Former electoral constituency for the Reichstag
- Location within the Weimar Republic
- State: Bavaria
- Electorate: 1,435,529 (1919); 1,779,790 (1933)
- Major settlements: Munich, Augsburg, Ingolstadt

Former constituency
- Created: 1919
- Abolished: 1938

Upper Bavaria–Swabia was one of the 35 electoral districts (German: Wahlkreise) used to elect members to the Reichstag during the Weimar Republic. It sent members to the Reichstag in nine democratic elections between 1919 and 1933. It existed nominally in the show elections to the Nazi Reichstag until 1938.

It comprised the Regierungsbezirke Upper Bavaria and Swabia within the Free State of Bavaria. It was constituency 24 in the numbering scheme.

== Electoral system ==
The constituency was created for the 1919 election. Under the proportional representation electoral system of the Weimar Republic, voters cast a vote for party lists. Parties were awarded a seat for every 60,000 votes in a constituency. Excess votes were aggregated at two higher levels of seat distribution: an intermediate level combining multiple constituencies, where extra seats were awarded to parties' constituency lists, and a national level where seats were awarded to national lists of each party or alliance.

== Results (1919–1933) ==
=== Vote share ===
Party	1919	1920	1924 I	1924 II	1928	1930	1932 I	1932 II	1933
KPD		3.2	8.6	6.1	4.3	6.1	8.8	11.7	7.0
USPD	3.7	11.9	0.6	0.3	0.0				
SPD	32.8	15.8	13.2	17.8	22.7	19.3	15.4	14.9	14.0
DDP	11.1	5.6	2.0	2.9	2.4	1.7	0.5	0.3	0.3
Centre			1.0						
BVP	36.5	44.0	37.8	38.8	32.4	33.6	36.7	35.5	29.9
BB	14.8	12.9	10.1	13.7	16.6	12.3	5.4	6.4	3.6
DVP	(Note: Joint list with DNVP.)	6.6	0.9	1.8	3.2	1.3	1.1	0.8	0.4
DNVP	1.0		7.5	12.4	6.3	2.4	3.5	4.4	4.4
NSDAP			17.0	4.8	6.2	16.3	27.1	24.6	41.0
Other	0.1		1.0	1.6	5.8	7.1	1.6	1.4	0.4
Turnout	81.6	80.4	64.7	77.9	73.4	79.8	79.8	75.0	87.4
Source: Wahlen in Deutschland

=== Deputies ===
Election	Distribution	Seats
1919		15
1920		17
May 1924		13
Dec 1924		16
1928		16
1930		17
Jul 1932		20
Nov 1932		19
1933		24
Source: Wahlen in Deutschland
