= Gau Munich-Upper Bavaria =

Administrative division of Nazi Germany

Gau Munich–Upper Bavaria
- Gau of Nazi Germany
- 1930–1945
- Flag Coat of arms

- Map of Nazi Germany showing its administrative subdivisions (Gaue and Reichsgaue).
- Capital: Munich
- Population
  - 17 May 1939: 1,999,048
- Government
- Gauleiter
  - 1930–1944: Adolf Wagner
  - 1944–1945: Paul Giesler
- History
  - Establishment: 16 November 1930
  - Disestablishment: 8 May 1945
Preceded by	Succeeded by
Free State of Bavaria (Weimar Republic)	Bavaria; Allied-occupied Germany
- Today part of: Germany

The Gau Munich–Upper Bavaria (German: Gau München–Oberbayern) was an administrative division of Nazi Germany in Upper Bavaria from 1933 to 1945. From 1930 to 1933, it was the regional subdivision of the Nazi Party in that area.

== History ==
=== Establishment of the Gaue within the party ===
The Nazi Gau (plural Gaue) system was originally established in a party conference on 22 May 1926, in order to improve administration of the party structure. In the early stages, the borders and leaders of these Gaue fluctuated frequently, mainly due to internal power struggles. The Gau Munich-Upper Bavaria was, for the most part, identical with today's Regierungsbezirk Upper Bavaria, of which Munich is the capital.

=== The Gau from 1930 to 1933 ===
The Gau Munich-Upper Bavaria was formed on 16 November 1930 by a merger of the two previously separate Gaue Greater Munich and Upper Bavaria. It came under the leadership of Adolf Wagner, the Gauleiter of Greater Munich since November 1929, and remained under his formal leadership until his death in 1944. Until 1930, Bavaria, as the heartland of the Nazi movement in the 1920s, was seen by Hitler as his personal realm, the local Gaue commonly being called Untergaue (English: 'Sub-Gaue'), to show their dependence on the head of the party. Only when Hitler's ambitions turned national did his interest in Bavarian affairs dwindle. With the end of the internal power struggle, the following six Gaue had been established in Bavaria:

- Gau Schwaben (Gau of Swabia)
- Gau München-Oberbayern (Gau of Munich–Upper Bavaria)
- Gau Mainfranken (Gau of Main–Franconia)
- Gau Bayerische Ostmark (Gau of the Bavarian Eastern March)
- Gau Franken (Gau of Franconia)
- Gau Rheinpfalz (Gau of Rhineland Palatinate)

Within those and the other Nazi German Gaue, Munich-Upper Bavaria claimed an elevated position for itself. The reason for this being, that Munich was the birthplace of "the movement" (German: Hauptstadt der Bewegung, a title it officially carried). The Gaue called itself Traditionsgau München-Oberbayern to cement this elevated position.

=== The Gau from 1933 to 1945 ===
With the ascent of the Nazis to power on 30 January 1933, the so-called Machtergreifung, the party immediately began to disassemble the power of the German states, the Länder. It was envisioned by the Nazis that the Party-Gaue would take the place of the old structure. In reality, Hitler was afraid of such a move, fearing it would upset local party leaders and could possibly result in an inner-party power struggle.

Gradually, the Gauleiters (English: 'Gau Leaders') took control over their territories, reducing the local Minister Presidents — nominally the highest office in the German states — to figureheads. As such, the development of the Gau from an inner-party administration to a political and administrative sub-division of the country was gradual, not sudden, but completed by 1934. The process termed Gleichschaltung took care of all political opposition and the "Law on the Reconstruction of the Reich" of 30 January 1934 can possibly be seen as the final date for the transfer of power from the states to the Gaue.

In Munich-Upper Bavaria, the most populous Gau in Bavaria, the local Gauleiter Wagner, a personal friend of Hitler's, initially attempted to incorporate the neighboring Gau Schwaben, to increase his already considerable power.

The Gauleiter was directly appointed by Hitler and only answerable to him. In practice, Hitler was disinclined to take any meaningful interest in local affairs and as such the power of a Gauleiter was almost absolute.

Parallel to the five Bavarian Gauleiter, a Bavarian Minister President still existed during this time, the Nazi politician Ludwig Siebert and, after his death in 1942, his successor, Paul Giesler. As a third authority in the still existing state, Franz Ritter von Epp held the office of Reichsstatthalter but wielded no real power. When Gauleiter Wagner became increasingly ill, Paul Giesler, his deputy, took up the running of the Gau. After Wagner's death in April 1944, Giesler formally succeeded him in his office.

The Gau was home to Nazi Germany's first concentration camp in Dachau, which opened soon after the Machtergreifung.

With the outbreak of the Second World War, the power of the Gauleiter, and therefore the power of the Gau compared to the state government, increased. Many of the Gauleiters were put in charge of the war effort in their Military district (German: Wehrkreis). As the war progressed and Nazi Germany grew more desperate, the Gauleiter were put in total control of the war effort in their Gau from November 1942.

In September 1944, the Gauleiter were ordered to form the Volkssturm in a last effort to mobilise all of the male population. The Gauleiter took up the position of Reichsverteidigungskommissar (RVK, 'Reich Defence Commissioner'), in competition to the Wehrmacht. Paul Giesler was put in charge of Swabia and three of the formerly Austrian Gaue.

With the end of the war and the collapse of Nazi Germany, Gauleiter Giesler still remained a convinced Nazi, crushing an uprising in the Bavarian capital with the help of the SS on 28 April 1945. Its leader, Rupprecht Gerngroß, a Wehrmacht officer, survived, but many of his supporters were executed on Giesler's orders.

== Aftermath ==
All of Upper Bavaria, like most of the rest of Bavaria, became part of the US occupation zone. Only the Pfalz, geographically separated from the rest of the state, became part of the French occupation zone. Political power, at first lying with the occupation authorities, was soon returned to the new Bavarian government. The Regierungsbezirk Schwaben, never having formally been dissolved, took control of the civil administration of the region again. Its most pressing issue was the reconstruction of the destroyed cities and the refugee problem.

Paul Giesler, last Gauleiter of Munich-Upper Bavaria, attempted to commit suicide with his wife, fearing capture by the Allied forces but failed and was shot by one of his adjudants near Berchtesgaden on 8 May 1945.

== Other Nazi organisations in the region ==
The various departments of the Nazi organisation were by no means streamlined with the Gau system, but rather fiercely independent and competitive to each other. For example, while Bavaria was sub-divided in six Gaue, it was also divided in four sections of the SA, three sections of the SS and six sections of the Hitler Youth.

The Gau Munich–Upper Bavaria belonged to the military district Wehrkreis VII, which also had its headquarters in Munich.

== Gauleiter ==
The highest position in the Gau, Gauleiter, was held by only two people during the history of the Gau:

- Adolf Wagner - 16 November 1930 to 12 April 1944
- Paul Giesler - 12 April 1944 to May 1945

=== Deputy Gauleiter ===
Second in charge and, in Giesler's case, actually wielding the true power in the Gau due to Wagner's illness, were the Stellvertretende Gauleiter:

- Otto Nippold - December 1932 to 17 May 1940
- Joachim von Moltke - 1940 to 1942
- Paul Giesler - 28 June 1942 to 12 April 1944

== Structure ==
Like all Gaue since the restructuring of 1932, Munich-Upper Bavaria was in itself sub-divided in smaller administrative entities, in the structure of a pyramid, these being (1936):

- Kreise (26) - equivalent of a district
- Ortsgruppen (249)
- Zellen (1,291)
- Blocks (4,258)
