= Rudolf Asmis =

German jurist, colonial official and diplomat

Dr Rudolf Asmis
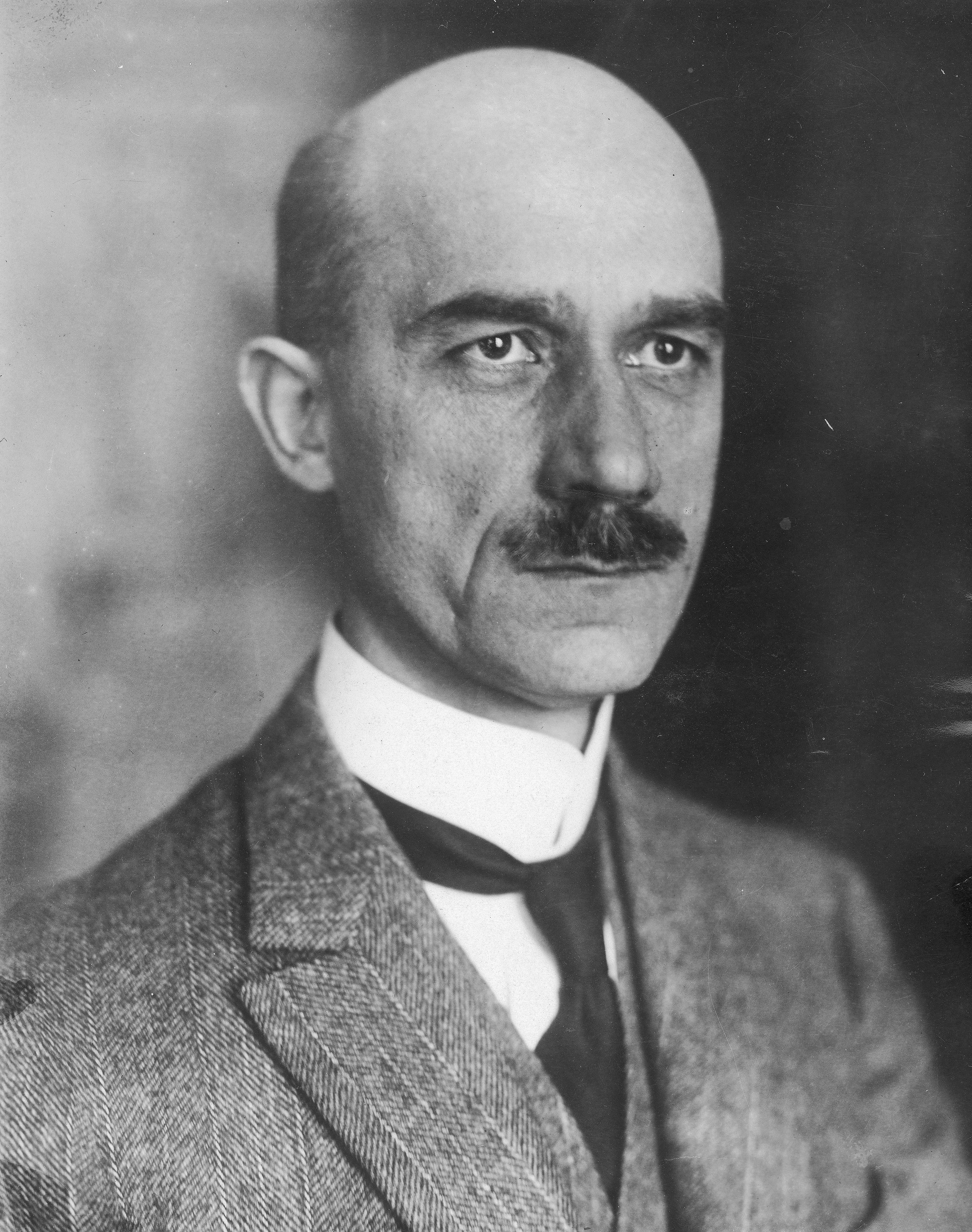
- Rudolf Asmis, photographed between 1919 and 1932
- Born: 12 June 1879; Mesekenhagen, Pomerania, Kingdom of Prussia
- Died: 13 November 1945 (aged 66); In Soviet custody, Berlin, Allied-occupied Germany
- Spouse: Karoline Asmis
- Children: Rudolf Asmis Snr. Herbert Asmis

Rudolf Albert August Wilhelm Asmis (12 June 1879 – 13 November 1945) was a German jurist, colonial official and diplomat who served as Minister to Siam and Consul-General for Australia.

== Early life ==
Rudolf Asmis was born on 12 June 1879 in Mesekenhagen, Pomerania and undertook law studies at the University of Greifswald, where he gained a Doctor of Laws in 1900 and was a member of the Singing Society "Gotia Greifswald" (part of the 'Sondershäuser Verband'). Asmis also later gained a Doctor of Philosophy in 1906. In 1900 Asmis became a Court clerk ("Gerichtsreferendar") in Pomerania. In 1904 he was promoted to "Gerichtsassessor" in Prussia.

== Colonial career ==
In 1906 Asmis, joined the Colonial Department of the Imperial Foreign Office, which became the Imperial Colonial Office ("Reichskolonialamt") in May 1907. From 1906 to 1911, Asmis served as a District Officer in Togoland, a German protectorate within German West Africa and was commissioned by the Reichstag to investigate the issue of tribal rights and administrative law reform in the colony. Asmis' work in this area served to promote a movement within German colonial circles of integrating German laws into its colonies in a manner acceptable to native societies, as well as the ability for District officers to refer to native laws in making legal decisions.

This innovative practice Asmis referred to as "Bezirksleiterrecht" (or "the law conducted by district officials"), and he also attempted to codify traditional laws of Togolese societies for the use by District officers. However his superiors back in Berlin viewed his actions as too innovative and too risky, given the political ramifications and called a stop to Asmis' work on codification in 1908. In a letter the German Governor Count von Zech, Colonial Secretary Bernhard Dernburg noted that Asmis' attempts at tribal law codification were "totally unfeasible" and "were designed to demolish the whole colonial effort."

== Diplomatic career ==
In 1911 Asmis returned to Germany and moved to the Imperial Foreign Office. In 1912 Asmis was appointed Consul in the capital of the Belgian Congo, Boma, with responsibilities for French Equatorial Africa excluding Gabon. As the German Consul in the Belgian Congo at the outbreak of the First World War in August 1914, Asmis did not learn of the outbreak of hostilities until two weeks after Britain had declared war on Germany on 4 August. Asmis managed to return to Germany, albeit with great difficulty, and took up a position as a counsellor in the General Government of Belgium, which had been set up in German-occupied Belgium.

With the end of the war, Asmis was appointed a Councillor (Geheimer Regierungsrat) to the Republican Ministry of the Interior, but returned to the Foreign Office in 1920. In 1921 he was appointed as the Head of the Foreign Trade Office and in 1922 was appointed a Counsellor in the German Embassy in Moscow, Soviet Union. While in Moscow in 1924, Asmis met and married the daughter, Karoline, of Ethnic Germans who had been living in the city since before the revolution. As a result of the marriage Asmis' wife and her family were able to escape Russia to Germany. Together they had two sons, Rudolf Snr. and Herbert. In 1923 Asmis was sent to Tashkent as a Counsellor in the German Representative Office to the Turkestan Autonomous Soviet Socialist Republic.

In 1924 Asmis spent a year in the German Legation in Peking as a Counsellor and in 1925 was appointed as the German Minister to Siam in Bangkok, the first German representative in the country since Siam's declaration of war against Germany in 1917. In April 1928, Asmis concluded the "Treaty of Friendship, Commerce and Navigation between the Kingdom of Siam and the German Reich", which set up a new era of diplomatic relations between Siam and Germany and coincided with the official end of various 'unequal treaties' imposed on Siam by the various foreign powers in the 19th century.

=== Consul-General for Australia ===
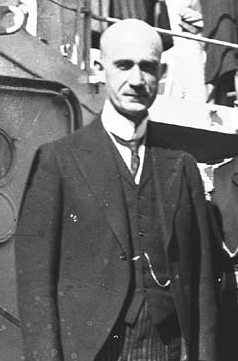
Asmis on board the German cruiser Köln in Sydney Harbour, May 1933.

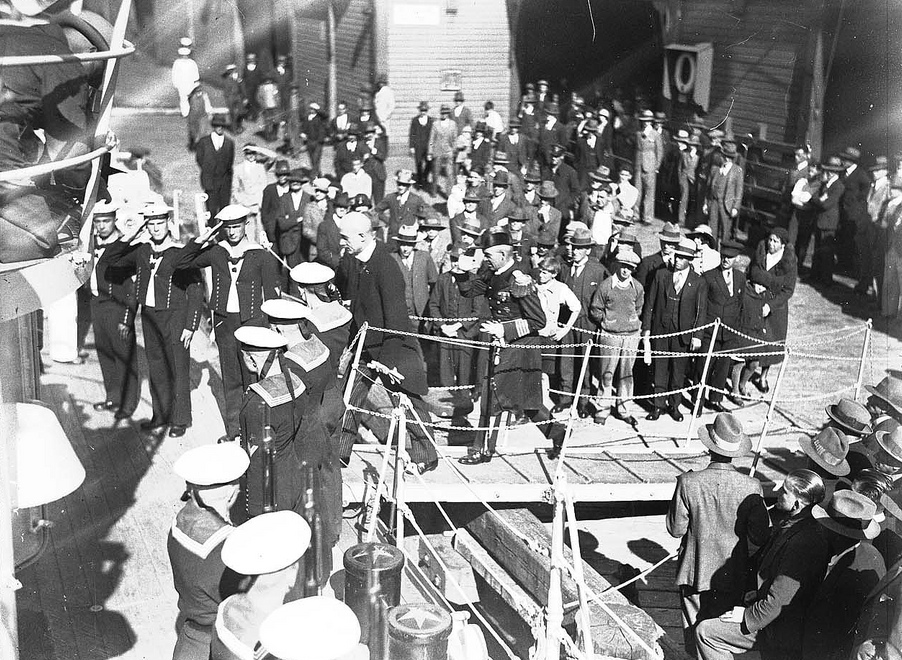
Asmis and Captain Otto Schniewind boarding the German cruiser Köln docked in Sydney Harbour, May 1933.

In October 1932, Asmis arrived in Sydney to take up his next appointment as Consul-General, First Class, for Germany to Australia, with responsibility for New Zealand and Fiji. With the coming to power of the Nazi Party in 1933, Asmis was enthusiastic in his efforts at fostering a native Nazi movement amongst the German community in Australia. By May 1933, Asmis had founded a "League of Germanism" and in March 1933 made an official statement intending to denounce reports of Nazi attacks on Jews in Germany while noting that the appearance of antisemitism in the Weimar Republic was, in his opinion, caused by "thousands of Jews [who] entered Germany from Eastern Europe, many of whom amassed huge fortunes at the expense of the impoverished population during the nation's most difficult times." From 1929 until April 1932 Asmis was a member of the German People's Party, but joined the Nazi Party on 1 April 1938.

As part of his reporting duties, in 1935 Asmis provided Berlin with a 31-page report on the status of aboriginals in Australia. Asmis had toured the outback and had spoken with a range of contacts including missionaries and anthropologists. His report did not reveal anything new or insightful, but it appeared he concurred with the prevalent view of the time that the best route for survival for indigenous Australians was to assimilation by adopting a "European work ethic".

In April 1939, Asmis was en route to Germany on annual leave when he expressed to Australian journalists that he did not think war was a potentiality: "I do not believe Germany would go to war to press her claims. I do not believe she will go into Poland. There will be no war for colonies." With the complete German occupation of Czechoslovakia in March 1939, Asmis moved to take over the functions of Czechoslovak Consulate in Sydney, an action that was not recognised by the Australian Government. Asmis was still on leave in Germany when Australia made its declaration of war against Germany on 3 September 1939, but the Acting Consul-General (and Consul in Adelaide since 1937) Dr Oskar Seger acted in his absence to hand over the Australian consulate to the Swiss Consul, Hans Georg Hedinger, with Switzerland being the protecting power.

== Later career and death ==
During the Second World War Asmis continued working at the Foreign Office in Berlin, but soon took on additional responsibilities in 1940 as the head of the reorganised NSDAP Office of Colonial Policy, overseeing (together with the Reichskolonialbund) Nazi Germany's plans for potential future colonial acquisitions. However, by the start of 1943 Hitler ordered the closure of all Party offices and organisations which weren't directly connected with maintenance of the war. After the dissolution of the Office, Asmis was appointed as a Head of Policy in the Foreign Office in 1944, which was responsible for Africa, Australia and New Zealand as well as mandate and colonial questions.

With the end of the war and the defeat of Germany, Asmis was arrested by the Soviet authorities and died in Soviet custody in Berlin on 13 November 1945, aged 66.

== Publications ==
- Der belgische Kongo nach dem Weltkriege ("The Belgian Congo after the world wars") (in German). KF Koehler. 1920.
- Als Wirtschaftspionier in Russisch-Asien ("As an economic pioneer in Russian Asia") (in German). G. Stilke. 1924.
- Erfahrungen aus meinen kolonialen Wanderjahren ("Experience of my colonial migrant years") (in German). Mittler. 1941.
- Kalamba na m'putu (in German). Mittler. 1942.
- Das Ende eines Paradieses ("The End of a Paradise") (in German). Reinshagen. 1942.

Diplomatic posts
Vacant Title last held by Paul von Buri	German Minister to Siam; 1925–1931	Succeeded by Erich August Karl Nord
Preceded by Hans Büsing	Consul-General of Germany for Australia; 1932–1939	Relations severed owing to World War II
Government offices
Preceded by Franz Ritter von Epp	Head of the Nazi Office of Colonial Policy; 1940–1943	Office abolished
