= Friedrich Haselmayr =

German army & SA general (1879–1965)

Oberfeldkommandant, Volhynia-Podolia
- In office 26 December 1941 – 1 December 1942

Feldkommandant, Lille
- In office 30 August 1940 – 26 December 1941

Führer for Special Assignments, Supreme SA Leadership (OSAF)
- In office 27 January 1934 – 8 May 1945

Deputy Leader, OSAF Military Policy Office
- In office 8 September 1932 – October 1935

General Manager and Political Department Chief, NSDAP Office of Military Policy
- In office 8 September 1932 – October 1935

Other positions
- 1933–1936: Reichstag Deputy
- 1933: Bavarian Landtag Deputy

Personal details
- Born: 11 April 1879 Kirchenlaibach, Kingdom of Bavaria, German Empire
- Died: 18 June 1965 (aged 86) Lochham, Bavaria, West Germany
- Party: Nazi Party
- Education: Ludwig-Maximilians-Universität München
- Profession: Military officer Historian
- Civilian awards: Golden Party Badge; Blood Order
- Nickname: Fritz

Military service
- Allegiance: German Empire; Weimar Republic; Nazi Germany
- Branch/service: Royal Bavarian Army; Reichswehr; German Army
- Years of service: 1897–1928; 1939–1943
- Rank: Oberst; Generalleutnant
- Unit: 16th Royal Bavarian Infantry Regiment; 45th Infantry Regiment; 20th Infantry Regiment
- Battles/wars: World War I World War II
- Military awards: Iron Cross, 1st and 2nd class Military Merit Order, 4th class with swords and crown

Friedrich "Fritz" Haselmayr (11 April 1879 – 18 June 1965) was a long-serving German professional military officer who was in active service under the German Empire, the Weimar Republic and Nazi Germany. He participated in both world wars and attained the rank of Generalleutnant. He was also a member of the Nazi Party and worked on military policy issues in its national leadership. As a member of the Party's paramilitary unit, the Sturmabteilung (SA), he reached the rank of SA-Obergruppenführer. He also was a deputy in the Landtag of Bavaria and in the German Reichstag.

== Early life and war service ==
Haselmayr was born in Kirchenlaibach in the municipality of Speichersdorf, the son of a surveyor. After attending the local Volksschule and the humanistic Gymnasium in Passau, Haselmayr joined the Royal Bavarian Army in July 1897 and was assigned as a Fahnenjunker (officer cadet) to the 16th Infantry Regiment in Passau. After attending the Munich Kriegsschule, he was commissioned as a Leutnant on 10 March 1899. He served as an adjutant from 1905 to 1907, followed by attendance at the Bavarian War Academy in Munich from 1907 to 1910. He returned to his regiment from September 1910 to October 1912 when he was assigned as an instructor of tactics at the Kriegsschule. Promoted to Hauptmann in October 1913, he remained at his teaching post until August 1914, shortly after the outbreak of the First World War.

Haselmayr served with the 2nd Reserve Infantry Regiment and was subsequently deployed on the western front in France. He became a company and battalion commander until 6 July 1915 when he was appointed adjutant of the 1st Landwehr Division. Almost two years later, in April 1917, he was transferred to a staff position on the Bavarian general command. From February 1918, he served as a General Staff officer to various units through the end of the war. On 18 August 1918, he was promoted to Major and, for his achievements during the war, he was awarded the Iron Cross, 1st and 2nd class, as well as the Military Merit Order, 4th class with swords and crown.

== Interwar period ==
=== Reichswehr service ===
After the end of the war, Haselmayr was initially assigned as an adjutant at the I Royal Bavarian Corps. After the general command was dissolved, he was military commissioner for the government of Lower Bavaria in Landshut between June and October 1919. He was accepted into the peacetime Reichswehr and deployed to the staff of the 2nd Battalion of the 45th Infantry Regiment in Würzburg, becoming deputy battalion commander from February to May 1920. At the end of August 1920, he was advanced to commander of the 3rd Battalion through the end of 1920. On 1 January 1921, he was transferred to Ingolstadt to command the 2nd Battalion of the 20th Infantry Regiment.

Haselmayr was transferred on 1 October 1923 to the 7th Division in Wehrkreis (military district) VII, headquartered in Munich. There, he was placed in charge of the division's Führergehilfenausbildung, (leader assistance training) which was the program by which the Reichswehr circumvented the Versailles Treaty's prohibition against training general staff officers. While in this post, he acted as an intermediary between the army units and the rebels during Adolf Hitler's failed Beer Hall Putsch on 9 November 1923, for which he was later awarded the Blood Order. On 1 February 1924, he was promoted to Oberstleutnant and later was transferred to Öls (today, Oleśnica) as a Führergehilfenausbildung instructor for Reiter Regiment 8, from July 1925 until October 1926. Transferred back to the staff of the 7th Division, Haselmayr joined the staff of the Munich high command on 15 January 1927. On 31 January 1928, he was discharged from the Reichswehr after thirty years and was awarded the rank of brevet Oberst.

=== Nazi Party and SA involvement ===
On 1 April 1928, Haselmayr joined the Nazi Party (membership number 85,034) at the Munich Ortsgruppe (local group). As an early Party member, he later would be awarded the Golden Party Badge. After leaving military service, he studied history and law at the Ludwig-Maximilians-Universität München for the next two years. He became a member of the National Socialist Students' League and served as a Nazi Party member of the General Student Committee. He also founded a Nazi student newspaper, the Akademischer Beobachter (Academic Observer). From 1929 to 1933, he was active as a freelance writer and was an employee on the staff of the largest Nazi newspaper, the Völkischer Beobachter, writing on military matters. In April 1929, he used this forum to praise General Erich Ludendorff, a prominent Nazi supporter, on the occasion of his sixty-fourth birthday. He praised Ludendorff's strategic genius and alleged that much of the credit that was due to him went instead to Generalfeldmarschall Paul von Hindenburg, then the President of Germany. During these years, Haselmayr also was the leader of the Working Group for German Rearmament. In 1932, he traveled to Switzerland as a Nazi observer to the Disarmament Conference in Geneva and the Reparations Conference in Lausanne.

Haselmayr was named the representative for military policy questions in the Nazi Party Reichsleitung (national leadership) in 1930. From 8 September 1932 to 31 March 1934, he was the general manager of the NSDAP Office of Military Policy under Franz Ritter von Epp, advancing to the leadership of Department I (Political Department) from 1 April 1934 through October 1935, shortly before the Office was dissolved. He was concurrently Epp's deputy leader in the Military Policy Office of the Supreme SA Leadership (OSAF) from September 1932 to October 1935.

Following the Nazi seizure of power, Haselmayr was made a deputy to the Bavarian Landtag in March 1933 and served until the Nazis dissolved the Landtag in October. On 1 April 1933, he formally joined the SA with the rank of SA-Gruppenführer and would be promoted to SA-Obergruppenführer on 11 April 1939. He was designated as a Führer for special assignments in OSAF on 27 January 1934, a position he would hold until the fall of the Nazi regime. On 12 November 1933, Haselmayr was elected as a member of the Reichstag for electoral constituency 24 (Upper Bavaria–Swabia) where he served until March 1936. Although he ran again in the election of 29 March 1936, he did not receive a mandate. He again failed in his bid for a Reichstag seat in the 10 April 1938 election.

Haselmayr was also involved with multiple special interest groups throughout this period. From August 1933 to January 1936, he was an honorary member of the Deutschen Gesellschaft für Wehrpolitik und Wehrwissenschaften (German Society for Military Policy and Military Science). In 1934, he became the vice-president of the Deutsche Gesellschaft für Volkerbundfragen (German Society for League of Nations Issues). In September 1935, he became the founder and leader of the Arbeitsgemeinschaft für Wehrgeistige Forschung (Working Group for Military Spirit Research). In October of the same year, he was appointed to the council of experts of the Reichsinstitut für Geschichte des neuen Deutschlands (Reich Institute for the History of the New Germany). He was also president of the Deutsche Studienkomittee (German Study Committee) of the New Commonwealth Society.

== Second World War service ==
On 25 July 1935, Haselmayr was awarded the brevet rank of Generalmajor, and he was placed at the disposal of the German Army on 1 July 1938. After the outbreak of the Second World War and the fall of France, Haselmayr was mobilized and, from 20 June to 30 August 1940, was assigned to the office responsible for the prisoners of war in occupied France. He then was a Feldkommandant (field commandant) in Lille until 26 December 1941 and was promoted to Oberst on 1 December 1940 and to Generalmajor on 7 July 1941. Transferred to the eastern front in December 1941, he served as the Oberfeldkommandant (senior field commandant) in the security region Volhynia-Podolia. On 1 December 1942 he was transferred to the Führerreserve. On 1 January 1943, he was promoted to Generalleutnant and left active military service on 31 January 1943.

== Army and SA ranks ==
Army and SA ranks
Date	Rank
16 July 1897	Fahnenjunker
17 December 1897	Fahnenjunker-Unteroffizier
25 January 1898	Portepeefähnrich
10 March 1899	Leutnant
28 October 1909	Oberleutnant
1 October 1913	Hauptmann
18 August 1918	Major
1 February 1924	Oberstleutnant
31 January 1928	Brevet Oberst
1 April 1933	SA-Gruppenführer
25 July 1935	Brevet Generalmajor
11 April 1939	SA-Obergruppenführer
1 December 1940	Oberst
7 July 1941	Generalmajor
1 January 1943	Generalleutnant

== Post-war years ==
Following the end of the war in Europe, Haselmayr was held as a prisoner of war from July 1945 to 28 June 1947. He underwent denazification proceedings beginning in February 1949. After all appeals were concluded in July 1951, he was classified into Category II (offender). However, on 11 March 1952, after the intercession of the Bavarian Minister for Political Liberation, the court decision was nullified. Haselmayr thereafter lived in Lochham, a section of Gräfelfing on the outskirts of Munich, where he resumed writing history until his death in 1965, including a multi-volume work on the diplomatic history of the German Empire.

== Selected writings ==
The following are a selection of Haselmayr's published works.

- Deutschlands Recht auf Wehrverstärkung (1931)
- Wehrpolitik und wehrpolitische Erziehung (1934)
- Materialien zur deutschen Sicherheit (1935)
- Die Wehrmacht (1935)
- Wehrgeistiges Schrifttum (1938)
- Diplomatische Geschichte des zweiten Reichs von 1871–1918, 7 volumes, (1955–1964)

== Sources ==
- Faust, Anselm (1973). Der Nationalsozialistische Deutsche Studentenbund: Studenten und Nationalsozialismus in der Weimarer Republik. Vol. 1, 2. Düsseldorf: Schwann. ISBN 978-3-789-50152-4.
- Information about Friedrich Haselmayr in the Reichstag database
- Klee, Ernst (2007). Das Personenlexikon zum Dritten Reich. Wer war was vor und nach 1945. Frankfurt-am-Main: Fischer-Taschenbuch-Verlag. ISBN 978-3-596-16048-8.
- Miller, Michael D.; Schulz, Andreas (2015). Leaders of the Storm Troops. Vol. 1. Solihull, England: Helion & Company. ISBN 978-1-909-98287-1.
- Stockhorst, Erich (1985). 5000 Köpfe: Wer War Was im 3. Reich. Arndt. ISBN 978-3-887-41116-9.
