= NSDAP Office of Military Policy =

Nazi Party organization

The NSDAP Office of Military Policy (German: Wehrpolitisches Amt der NSDAP, W.P.A. or WPA, literally "NSDAP Office of Defense Policy" in English) was a Nazi Party organization. It was established on 8 September 1932 in a decree by Adolf Hitler, and was led by Franz Ritter von Epp. His deputy was Friedrich Haselmayr who served as the general manager from September 1932 until April 1934, and then as leader of Department I, Politische Abteilung (Political Department), until October 1935. The office was housed in the same building as the NSDAP Office of Foreign Affairs, headed by Alfred Rosenberg.

During the remilitarization of Germany, started by the Nazis shortly after they took power, its avowed aim was to "clarify military-political questions, to conduct propaganda campaigns for the purpose of creating a belligerent spirit and a better understanding of military matters among the people, and to control all activities in the fields of military politics and sciences."

This attempt to gain sole authority in all matters of defense education and training brought it into conflict with the Defense Ministry, which objected to this intrusion into its monopoly on arms-bearing. As a result, it was dissolved at the end of December 1935, which did not bother Hitler; aside from the propaganda and war ministries there were also numerous other institutions and organizations already concerned with the 'remilitarization' of the German people.

== See also ==
- Amt Rosenberg
- NSDAP Office of Colonial Policy
- NSDAP Office of Foreign Affairs
- NSDAP Office of Racial Policy
