= Harry Fiss =

- Born: Harry Kranner; April 15, 1926; Vienna, Austria
- Died: May 2, 2009 (aged 83); Washington, Connecticut
- Education: New York University
- Occupation: Psychologist

Harry Fiss (born Harry Kranner; April 15, 1926 – May 2, 2009) was an Austrian-born American psychologist known for his contributions to sleep and dream research.

He was the only son of Edmund and Gertrude Kranner. His father died when Harry was three years old. Harry was born and raised in Vienna, Austria, and lived with his mother and stepfather until the family immigrated to the United States in 1939.

Fiss was drafted into the United States Army on his 18th birthday, in 1944. He served with the 9th Army Air Force, landing in Europe on V-E Day, May 8, 1945. In October 1945, he was assigned to the Palace of Justice shortly before the start of the Nuremberg Trials. Fiss served as Chief of Documentation for the American prosecution, responsible for translation, analysis, and security of materials used during the course of the trials. He served as the interpreter during the interrogation in which Rudolf Höss admitted to being directly responsible for the deaths of two million Jews in the Holocaust. He also translated Alfred Rosenberg's handwritten diary, which was used in evidence during the trials.

He was discharged from the Army in 1946, after which he studied English at New York University’s Washington Square College. Upon his graduation in 1949, he moved to California to work as a news writer and editor for KCBS radio in San Francisco. However, his German accent prevented him from advancing in his career, and he returned to New York to work in his family's business.

Fiss received his doctorate in psychology from New York University in 1961. From 1963 to 1969, he was in charge of the sleep research lab at the Research Center for Mental Health at NYU, one of the first sleep research laboratories in the United States. During this time, he collaborated with George S. Klein on a series of experimental sleep and dream studies. A pioneer in the field, Dr. Fiss was principal investigator of one of the first government-funded grants in the field of sleep and dream studies. He was a professor at the University of Connecticut School of Medicine and director of the Psychology Division in the Department of Psychiatry from 1973 to 1993. Fiss was also an American Board of Professional Psychology Diplomate in Clinical Psychology and a clinical psychologist, practicing individual and family therapy in West Hartford, Connecticut.

Harry Fiss died on May 2, 2009, in Washington, Connecticut, at the age of 83. He was survived by his wife Sari Max-Fiss and daughters Karen Fiss and Naomi Horton.
