= NSDAP Office of Foreign Affairs =

Pre-war Nazi Party foreign policy organization

- Außenpolitisches Amt der NSDAP (German)
- Parteiadler

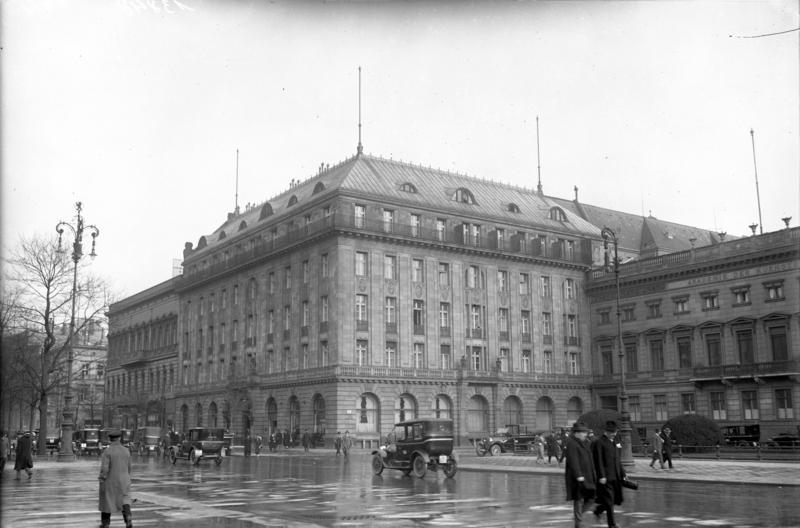
- The Hotel Adlon in Berlin: From 1933, Alfred Rosenberg's Foreign Policy Office (APA) was located in a side wing of the building.

Office overview
- Formed: April 1933
- Dissolved: February 1943
- Superseding Office: Ministry of Public Enlightenment and Propaganda
- Headquarters: Hotel Adlon

The NSDAP Office of Foreign Affairs (German: Außenpolitisches Amt der NSDAP, A.P.A. or APA) was a Nazi Party organization. It was set up in April 1933 in the Hotel Adlon in Berlin immediately after the Nazi Machtergreifung ("Seizure of power"). It was led by Alfred Rosenberg. It was one of the central authorities for the foreign policy of Nazi Germany, alongside the Foreign Office (AA) under the leadership of Neurath, the Nazi Party's Auslandsorganisation (NSDAP/AO) of Ernst Wilhelm Bohle, Joachim von Ribbentrop's special bureau (Dienststelle Ribbentrop) and part of the Ministry of Public Enlightenment and Propaganda (RMVP) under Joseph Goebbels.

The APA lost its political importance and function in July 1941 at the latest, when Rosenberg was appointed head of the Reich Ministry for the Occupied Eastern Territories (RMfdbO). From then on, numerous APA employees worked at the RMfdbO. In February 1943, the APA was shut down as part of the "total war effort" measures.

== See also ==
- Amt Rosenberg
- Reichsleiter Rosenberg Taskforce
- NSDAP Office of Colonial Policy
- NSDAP Office of Military Policy
- NSDAP Office of Racial Policy
