= Amt Rosenberg =

Nazi Germany official body for cultural policy and surveillance

Rosenberg Office
- Amt Rosenberg (German)
- Parteiadler

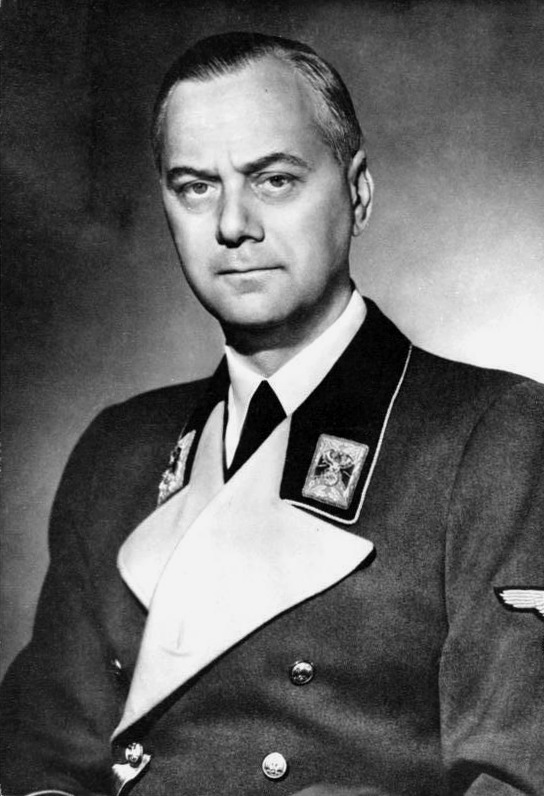
- Alfred Rosenberg in the 1940s

Office overview
- Formed: April 27, 1934
- Dissolved: May 8, 1945
- Headquarters: Margarethenstraße 17, Berlin

Amt Rosenberg (ARo, Rosenberg Office) was an official body for cultural policy and surveillance within the Nazi party, headed by Alfred Rosenberg. It was established in 1934 under the name of Dienststelle Rosenberg (DRbg, Rosenberg Department), with offices at Margarethenstraße 17 in Berlin, to the west of Potsdamer Platz. Due to the long official name of Rosenberg's function, Beauftragter des Führers für die gesamte geistige und weltanschauliche Erziehung der NSDAP ("Führer's representative for the entire intellectual and ideological education of the Nazi Party"), the short description Reichsüberwachungsamt "Reich surveillance office" was used alongside, also shortened simply to Überwachungsamt "surveillance office".

In post-World War II historiography, "Amt Rosenberg" is also used in a wider sense as a term for a number of official functions of Rosenberg which he held between 1928 and 1945. These included the Außenpolitisches Amt der NSDAP (APA "NSDAP Office of Foreign Affairs", including the Nordische Gesellschaft ("Nordic League")), Kampfbund für deutsche Kultur (KfdK "Militant League for German Culture"), NS-Kulturgemeinde ("NS-Cultural Community") (including the Kraft durch Freude ("Strength Through Joy") and Deutsche Bühne ("German Stage") theatres), Hohe Schule der NSDAP ("Advanced School of the NSDAP") and Einsatzstab Reichsleiter Rosenberg (ERR "Reichsleiter Rosenberg Taskforce"), an organisation devoted to acquiring and stealing art objects across the occupied territories of the Reich. Not included in the term as used by Bollmus (2007) is the Reichsministerium für die besetzten Ostgebiete (RMfdbO "Reich Ministry for the Occupied Eastern Territories"), because it was a government office, not a party office.

== See also ==
- Ahnenerbe
- Ministry of Public Enlightenment and Propaganda
- Nazi loot
- Nazi propaganda
- NSDAP Office of Colonial Policy
- NSDAP Office of Foreign Affairs
- NSDAP Office of Military Policy
- NSDAP Office of Racial Policy
