= NSDAP Office of Colonial Policy =

Nazi Party office that was formed in 1934 to plan re-taking of the former German colonies

The NSDAP Office of Colonial Policy (German: Kolonialpolitisches Amt der NSDAP, K.P.A. or KPA) was a Nazi Party office formed in 1934. Its stated objective was to formulate plans for the re-taking of the former German colonies, including in Africa. The office lost much of its meaning after the start of World War II, and was dissolved after the reversal of Nazi Germany's military victories in 1943.

== History ==
There were several predecessor organization created in response to the German colonial problem in the Nazi Party. The last was the Colonial Section of the paramilitary wing of the Nazi Party, under the central command of the Sturmabteilung (SA) leadership. After the purge of the SA in the Night of the Long Knives, it was reformed as the Colonial Political Office in 1934, with Franz Ritter von Epp as its leader. From then on, its task was to provide clear directives and policy guidelines for the party and its press in regard to every colonial, political and economic problems. In addition, the office also formulated plans for the reacquisition of the former German colonies. As part of Gleichschaltung (Nazification), the office had to match the colonial policies of the central regime.

Few sources exist about the early development of the office. Its headquarters was located at the party seat of the NSDAP in Munich, but the Planning Department was moved to Berlin in 1936, to improve co-operation with the Colonial Section of the Foreign Office. It did not then possess any budgetary resources of its own. To set up a proper budget, it was assigned several state administrators from the Nazi Party. Many of its leading experts took over such functions, and the rest was composed of some higher political officials.

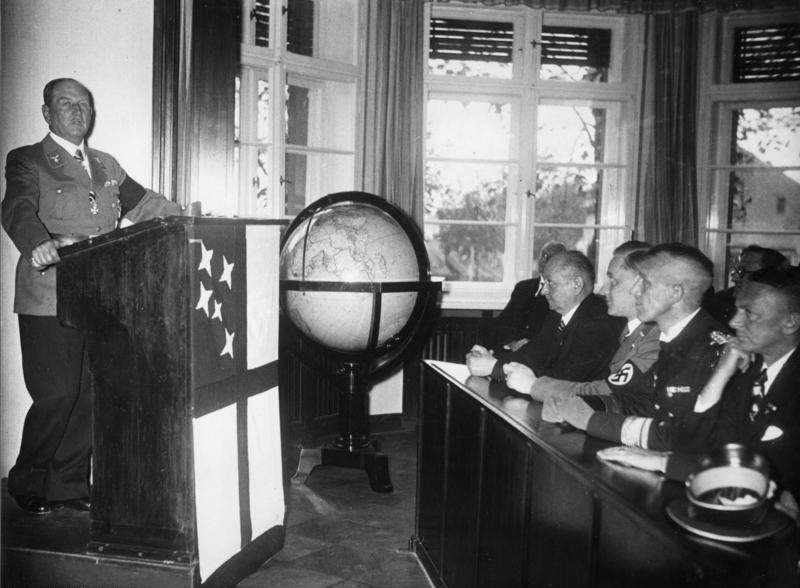
Opening of a school for colonialism in Ladeburg-Bernau in (reader: Franz von Epp; seated from left to right: Central Office Leader Wenig, Rear Admiral Fuchs and Reich Office Leader Scheidt)

Epp's request for his office to be assigned a role as the central state body for the formulation of colonial policy was denied by Adolf Hitler in 1938. Its assigned tasks were nevertheless extended. Hitler instructed Von Epp that the office should prepare for a new period of colonial conquest after which the takeover of the colonies itself would fall within the jurisdiction of the Foreign Office.

In 1940, all Reich departments were subordinated to the Colonial Political Office on overseas colonial matters. Its financial revenues also increased. In 1940 its reported expenditure was more than 870,000 ℛ︁ℳ︁, an increase of 555% in over previous years.

The internal structure also underwent some changes. The office transformed itself into both a party organization in Munich and as a state organization in Berlin. Its new leader was the former diplomat Rudolf Asmis. The Colonial Political Office of the NSDAP and the Reich had four different departments and around 260 employees. Of the bureaucrats, 36 were a part of the office's higher and 44 of the mid-level services.

Subsidiary offices were later established in Paris and Brussels.

== Colonial planning ==
The office prepared plans for a vast colonial domain in Mittelafrika from Ghana to Namibia and from Chad to Tanzania. In conjunction with the SS a central staff was assembled for the hostile takeover of colonies from Germany's war enemies. It prepared blueprints for the establishment of colonial law as well as training courses for potential future colonial administrators. In particular, it also drew up plans for racial segregation under a "Colonial Blood Law" (Kolonialblutschutzgesetz).

== Dissolution ==
With the coming end of the Second World War and the resulting victory of the Allies over Nazi Germany, the office swiftly lost any degree of importance it might have had. Already in the start of 1943 Hitler had ordered the closure of all Party offices and affiliations not directly connected with maintenance of the war. Together with the Reichskolonialbund, it was finally dissolved in February 1943.

== See also ==
- Amt Rosenberg
- Imperial Colonial Office
- Franz Ritter von Epp
- German colonial empire
- Impact of Western European colonialism and colonisation
- List of former German colonies
- Mittelafrika
- NSDAP Office of Foreign Affairs
- NSDAP Office of Military Policy
- NSDAP Office of Racial Policy
- Reichskolonialbund
