= Protestantische Rompilger =

Protestantische Rompilger (Protestant Rome Pilgrims) (subtitled: Der Verrat an Luther, or The treason of Luther) was a polemic written by Alfred Rosenberg to answer the Protestant criticism (mainly from the Confessing Church) of his 1930 The Myth of the Twentieth Century. It was also aimed against Friedrich Rittelmeyer and the Christengemeinschaft (Christian Community). In it, he demanded that the German Volk be released from Christianity and called Christian teachings of sin and grace as "teachings of inferiority". It was published by the Hoheneichen-Verlag, Munich, in a gift edition (already on its 4th edition by 1932, 696 S.), Volksausgabe (from 1933, 712 S.), Dünndrucksaugabe (712 S), and in an 86-page 1937 edition.

== Reactions ==
=== Protestant churches ===
The work released a storm of indignation from the Deutschen Evangelischen Kirche (German Evangelical Church), Evangelisch-Lutherischen Kirche (Evangelical-Lutheran Church), Bruderrat der Evangelischen Kirche (Council of Brethren of the Evangelical Church), Schlesische Bekenntnissynode (Silesian Confessional Synod), Martin-Luther-Bund (Martin Luther League) and other connected organisations. 96 church leaders signed the Die Erklärung der 96 evangelischen Kirchenführer gegen Alfred Rosenberg against it in 1937. Walter Kunneth was a prominent Lutheran involved in the polemical controversy against Rosenberg.

=== Roman Catholic church ===
Bishop Alois Hudal, rector of the foundation of Santa Maria dell'Anima and an expert of the Holy Office, played a large part in getting "Myth of the 20th Century" placed on the Index of Forbidden Books on 7 February 1934 as a result of Protestantische Rompilger.

== Replies ==
- Ein Wort zu Alfred Rosenbergs Protestantische Rompilger: Rompilger oder Protestanten? Ulrich Nielsen, 1937
- Flugblatt des protestantischen Dekans, Kornacker, 1937
- Evangelische Wahrheit! Ein Wort zu Alfred Rosenbergs Schrift, Walter Künneth
- Antwort auf den Mythus, Walter Künneth, 1935
- Wider die Verfälschung des Protestantismus, Walter Künneth
- Evangelische Wahrheit! Ein Wort zu Alfred Rosenbergs Schrift "Protestantische Rompilger", Walter Künneth, 1937
- Verrat an Luther? Erwiderung auf Alfred Rosenbergs "Protestantische Rompilger", Siegfried Scharfe

== Bibliography ==
- Ökumenisches Jahrbuch 1936-1937, Friedrich Siegmund-Schultze, Hrsg., 434 S., Max Niehans Verlag, Zürich
- Ein Wort zu Alfred Rosenbergs Protestantische Rompilger : Rompilger oder Protestanten?, Ulrich Nielsen, Basel, Schriften Verlag, o.J. (nach 1937). 1. Auflage, 12 S., OBroschur, Evangelische Schriften Heft 8, Eine Entgegnung zu Rosenbergs Schrift von aufrichtigen Christen
- Protestantische Rompilger, Flugblatt des protestantischen Dekans Kornacker, Kornacker, 1937, Kempten
- Antwort auf den Mythus, Walter Künneth, 1935, 215 S., Wichern-Verlag, Berlin
- Evangelische Wahrheit! Ein Wort zu Alfred Rosenbergs Schrift "Protestantische Rompilger", Walter Künneth, 1937, 30 S., Wichern-Verlag, Berlin
- Wider die Verfälschung des Protestantismus, Walter Künneth
- Hitlers Pädagogen - Theorie und Praxis nationalsozialistischer Erziehung, Teil II: Pädagogische Felder, Hermann Giesecke, 2. Überarb. Aufl., Juventa-Verlag 1999, Weinheim
