= Mesekenhagen =

- Municipality
- Location of Mesekenhagen within Vorpommern-Greifswald district
- Interactive map of Mesekenhagen
- Location within Germany Location within Mecklenburg-Vorpommern
- Coordinates: 54°09′N 13°19′E
- Country: Germany
- State: Mecklenburg-Vorpommern
- District: Vorpommern-Greifswald
- Municipal assoc.: Landhagen
- Subdivisions: 7 Ortsteile

Government
  - Mayor: Geert Christoph Seidlein

Area
  - Total: 25.52 km^{2} (9.85 sq mi)
- Elevation: 0 m (0 ft)

Population (2025-12-31)
  - Total: 1,077
  - Density: 42.20/km^{2} (109.3/sq mi)
- Time zone: UTC+01:00 (CET)
  - Summer (DST): UTC+02:00 (CEST)
- Postal codes: 17498
- Dialling codes: 038351
- Vehicle registration: VG
- Website: www.amt-landhagen.de

Mesekenhagen is a municipality in the Vorpommern-Greifswald district, in Mecklenburg-Vorpommern, Germany.

== People ==
- Rudolf Asmis (1879-1945), German diplomat and politician
