= Reichskolonialbund =

Nazi German colonial organization (1936–1943)

- The emblem of the Reichskolonialbund was based on the flag of the German East Africa Company

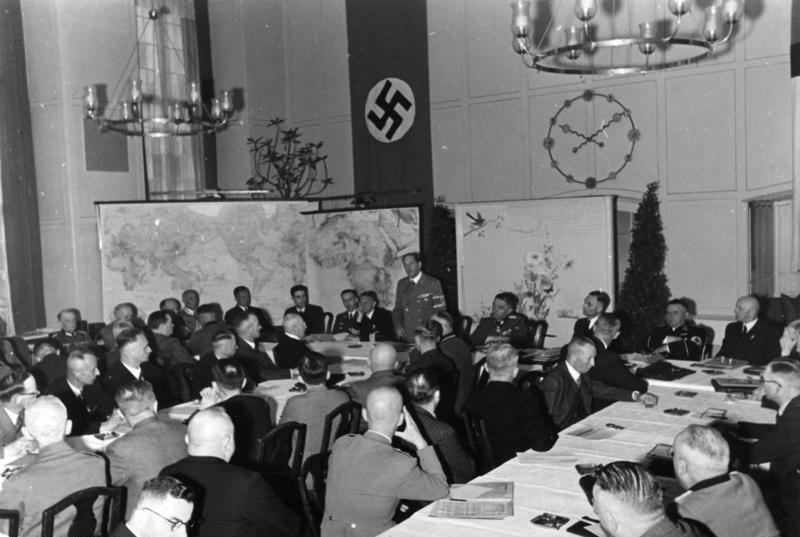
- A meeting of the RKB in Munich, 30 May 1942
- Abbreviation: RKB
- Predecessor: German Colonial Society
- Merged into: Koloniale Reichsarbeitsgemeinschaft
- Established: June 13, 1936; 90 years ago
- Founder: Heinrich Schnee
- Dissolved: 1943; 83 years ago
- Purpose: Re-acquisition of colonial lands
- Location: Nazi Germany
- Leader: Franz Ritter von Epp
- Main organ: Kolonie und Heimat; Deutsche Kolonialzeitung
- Parent organization: Nazi party
- Subsidiaries: Colonial Youth

The Reichskolonialbund (RKB; English: Reich Colonial League) was a collective body that absorbed all German colonial organisations during the time of the Third Reich. It was led by Franz Ritter von Epp.

The Reichskolonialbund was active between 1936 and 1943.

== History ==
=== Background ===
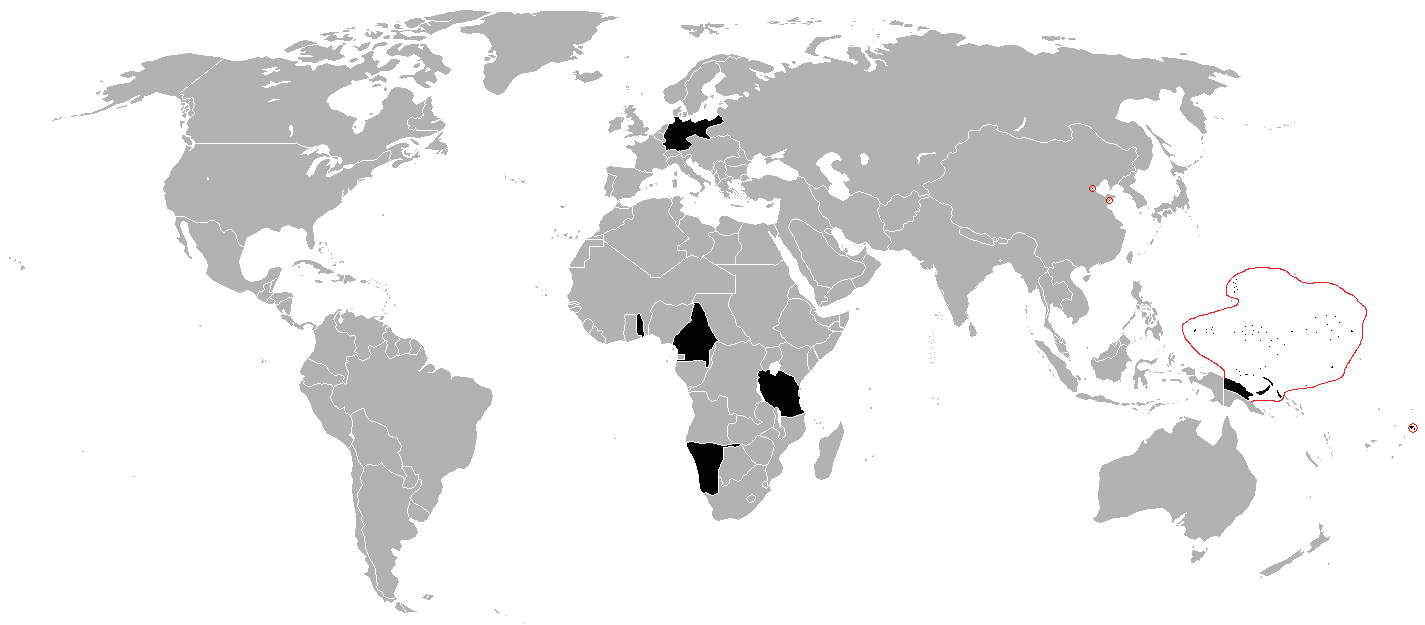
The German Colonial Empire circa 1914. Germany had lost all its overseas colonies by the time the Reichskolonialbund came to existence.

The purpose of the Reichskolonialbund was to reclaim the overseas colonies that Germany had lost as a result of the Treaty of Versailles at the end of World War I. The first efforts in rallying support for a re-establishment of a German Colonial Empire in Germany can be traced back to 1923. As a result, a number of pro-colonial organisations, supported by both conservative-minded Germans and nationalists, were established in different parts of Germany. Founded in 1925, the foremost outfit was the Koloniale Reichsarbeitsgemeinschaft (KORAG). This organisation, along with other groups, led to the foundation of the preliminary Reichskolonialbund in 1933. The establishment was made in two steps, the second one being its incorporation (Gliederung) into the Nazi Party structure; as a result many references give two different years for the Nazi Reichskolonialbund foundation, 1933 and 1936.

=== Establishment ===
The Reichskolonialbund was established on 13 June 1936 by the former governor of German East Africa, Heinrich Schnee. Whether the organisations that joined it did so freely, or were forced to do so in the name of Gleichschaltung, is a subject of conjecture. Led by Ritter von Epp, the organisation's alleged purpose was to "keep the population informed about the loss of the German Imperial colonies, to maintain contact with the former colonial territories and to create conditions in opinion favourable to a new German African Empire". The foundation of RKB was marred with difficulties, for only two months after its establishment, Rudolf Hess decreed its disbandment. However, after lengthy discussions, the decree was revoked in November of the same year.

As part of the Nazi triumphalism for the Third Reich, the Reichskolonialbund was intended to take over the role of the disbanded German Colonial Society, (Deutsche Kolonialgesellschaft) (DKG). Since Germany had no colonies, the Reichskolonialbund was mainly engaged in mostly virulent political agitation.

The agitation was conducted largely in Germany by means of newspapers, magazines, conferences and "Colonial Exhibitions". That was meant to keep open the so-called Colonial Question (Kolonialfrage) and to gather funds for the organisation. The most important weekly publications of the Reichskolonialbund between 1937 and 1943 were Kolonie und Heimat and the Deutsche Kolonialzeitung, the former mouthpiece of the German Colonial Company. The RKB also printed colourful posters for the advancement of its cause.

The Reichskolonialbund had its own youth organization, the Colonial Youth, which was incorporated as a wing of the Hitler Youth. Its members wore the regular Hitler Youth uniform with Reichskolonialbund badges and insignias. The youth regularly staged rallies and collected money for the colonial cause during the events organised by the Reichskolonialbund.

Adult members of the Reichskolonialbund also wore uniform during parades and rallies. The design was inspired by the Schutztruppe uniforms of the German Imperial Era.

The Reichskolonialbund held two parliamentary sessions, the first in Bremen in May 1938 and the second in Vienna in May 1939.

=== Twilight and end ===
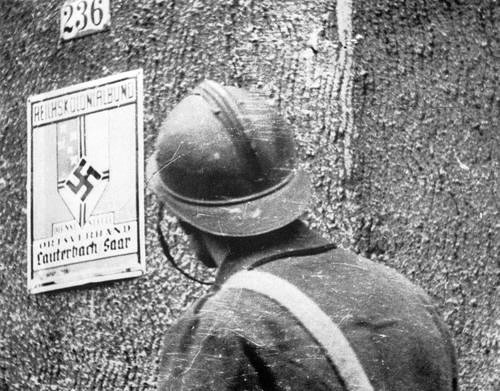
A French soldier outside of a Reichskolonialbund office in Lauterbach during the 1939 Saar Offensive

The decline of the Reichskolonialbund began with the onset of World War II, when the Nazi State focused on other priorities, foremost of which was the search for a Lebensraum in the East of Europe. Finally in 1943 the Reichsleiter Martin Bormann pressed for the dissolution of the Reichskolonialbund on the grounds of "kriegsunwichtiger Tätigkeit" ("activity irrelevant to the war"). Hence the Reichskolonialbund was swiftly disbanded by a decree of the Führer in 1943.

The disbandment of the organisation and its assets was unceremonious, akin to an asset stripping (Beschlagnahmung). Most of the Reichskolonialbund's files lie in the archives in Koblenz, where there are 5,140 documents from the period 1925 to 1943.

== See also ==
- German colonial empire
- NSDAP Office of Colonial Policy
- German Colonial Society
- Society for German Colonization
- List of former German colonies
- German East Africa Company
- German South West Africa
- Kamerun
- Togoland
- Mittelafrika
- German New Guinea
- Kiautschou Bay Leased Territory
- Qingdao
- New Swabia
- Wituland
- Carl Peters
- Hitler Youth
