= Alfred Rosenberg =

Baltic German Nazi theorist and war criminal (1893–1946)

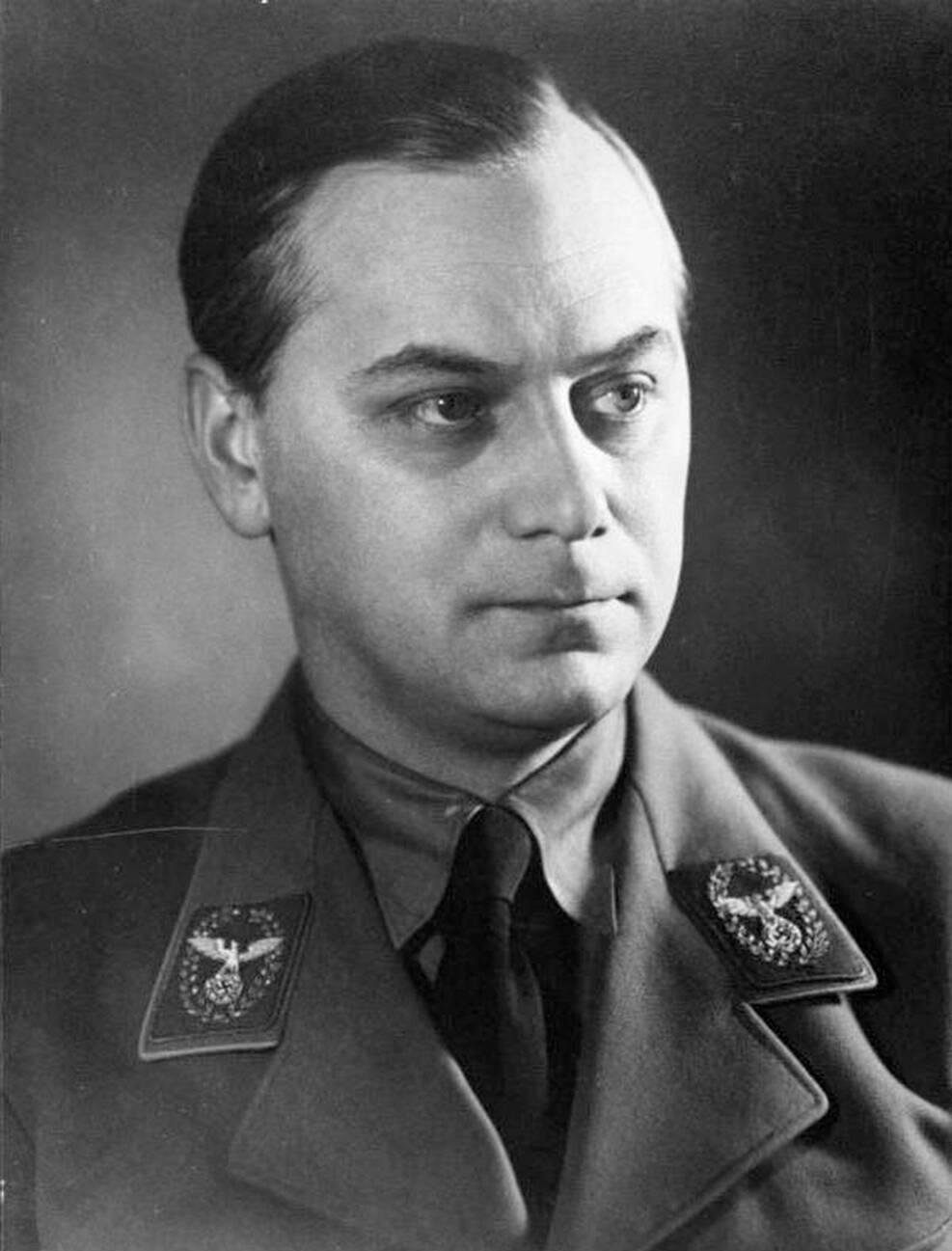
- Rosenberg in 1939

Leader of the Foreign Policy Office of the NSDAP
- In office 1 April 1933 – 8 May 1945
- Preceded by: Position established
- Succeeded by: Position abolished

Reichsleiter
- In office 2 June 1933 – 8 May 1945

Führer's Representative for the Supervision of Intellectual and Ideological Education of the NSDAP ("Rosenberg Office")
- In office 27 January 1934 – 8 May 1945
- Preceded by: Position established
- Succeeded by: Position abolished

Reich Minister for the Occupied Eastern Territories
- In office 17 July 1941 – 30 April 1945
- Deputy: Alfred Meyer
- Führer: Adolf Hitler
- Preceded by: Position established
- Succeeded by: Position abolished

Additional positions
- 1933–1945: Member of the Greater German Reichstag
- 1930–1933: Member of the Reichstag

Personal details
- Born: Alfred Ernst Rosenberg; 12 January 1893 Reval, Russian Empire
- Died: 16 October 1946 (aged 53) Nuremberg, Germany
- Party: Nazi Party
- Spouses: Hilda Leesmann (m. 1915; div. 1923); Hedwig Kramer (m. 1925)
- Children: 2
- Education: Riga Polytechnical Institute; Moscow Highest Technical School
- Profession: Architect, politician, writer
- Known for: Authoring The Myth of the Twentieth Century
- Cabinet: Hitler cabinet
- Criminal information
- Status: Executed by hanging
- Convictions: Conspiracy to commit crimes against peace; Crimes of aggression; War crimes; Crimes against humanity
- Trial: Nuremberg trials
- Penalty: Death

Alfred Ernst Rosenberg (12 January 1893 [O.S. 31 December 1892] – 16 October 1946) was a Baltic German Nazi philosopher and convicted war criminal.

Rosenberg was first introduced to Adolf Hitler by Dietrich Eckart, and he held several important posts in the Nazi government. He was the head of the NSDAP Office of Foreign Affairs during the entire rule of Nazi Germany (1933–1945), and led Amt Rosenberg ('Rosenberg's bureau'), an official Nazi body for cultural policy and surveillance, between 1934 and 1945. He also served as the editor of the Nazi Party newspaper Völkischer Beobachter. During World War II, Rosenberg was the head of the Reich Ministry for the Occupied Eastern Territories (1941–1945). He helped direct the genocide against the Slavs. After the war, he was convicted of crimes against peace; planning, initiating and waging wars of aggression; war crimes; and crimes against humanity at the Nuremberg trials in 1946. He was sentenced to death by hanging and executed on 16 October 1946.

The author of a seminal work of Nazi ideology, The Myth of the Twentieth Century (1930), Rosenberg is considered one of the main authors of key Nazi ideological creeds, including its racial theory and its hatred of the Jewish people, the need for Lebensraum, abrogation of the Treaty of Versailles, and opposition to what was considered "degenerate" modern art. He was also known for his hatred and rejection of what he regarded as "negative" Christianity; however, was an important figure who advocated for a Nazi-aligned Positive Christianity.

== Early life ==
=== Family ===
Rosenberg was born on 12 January 1893 in Reval (now Tallinn, Estonia), then in the Governorate of Estonia of the Russian Empire. His mother Elfriede (née Siré), who had French and German ancestry, was the daughter of Louise Rosalie (née Fabricius), born near Leal (modern Lihula, Estonia) in 1842, and of the railway official Friedrich August Siré, born in Saint Petersburg, Russia, in 1843. Born in the same city in 1868, Elfriede Siré received the Christian sacrament of Confirmation in Reval at 17 in 1885. She married Woldemar Wilhelm Rosenberg, a wealthy merchant from Reval, in the Lutheran Church of Saint Peter and Saint Paul (St-Petersburg) in 1886. The young Rosenberg's mother died two months after his birth.

His paternal grandfather, Martin Rosenberg, was a master shoemaker and elder of his craft guild. Born in Riga in 1820, and probably partly of Latvian descent, he had moved to Reval in the 1850s, where he met Julie Elisabeth Stramm, born in Jörden (now Juuru, Estonia) in 1835. The two married in the German St. Nicholas parish of Reval in 1856.

The Hungarian-Jewish journalist Franz Szell, who was apparently residing in Tilsit, Prussia, Germany, spent a year researching in Latvian and Estonian archives before publishing an open letter in 1936, with copies to Hermann Göring, Joseph Goebbels, Foreign Minister Konstantin von Neurath and others, accusing Rosenberg of having "no drop of German blood" flowing in his veins. Szell wrote that among Rosenberg's ancestors were only "Latvians, Jews, Mongols, and French." As a result of his open letter, Szell was deported by Lithuanian authorities on 15 September 1936. His claims were repeated in the 15 September 1937 issue of the Vatican newspaper L'Osservatore Romano. These allegations have not been substantiated by historical evidence and appear to have been politically motivated, as Rosenberg was born to a Baltic German father and an Estonian mother and did not have Jewish ancestry.

=== Education and early career ===
The young Rosenberg graduated from the Petri-Realschule (currently Tallinna Reaalkool) and enrolled in architecture studies at the Riga Polytechnical Institute in the autumn of 1910. In 1915, as the German army was approaching Riga, the entire school evacuated to the Moscow Imperial Higher Technical School (Russian: Императорское Московское техническое училище (ИМТУ)), where he completed his PhD studies in 1917. During his stays at home in Reval, he attended the art studio of the famed painter Ants Laikmaa—though he showed promise, there are no records that he ever exhibited.

During the German occupation of Estonia in 1918, Rosenberg served as a drawing teacher at the Gustav Adolf Gymnasium and Tallinna II Reaalkool (current Tallinn Polytechnic School). He gave his first speech on "Jewish Marxism" on 30 November, at the House of the Blackheads, after the 28 November 1918 outbreak of the Estonian War of Independence. He emigrated to Germany with the retreating Imperial German army, along with Max Scheubner-Richter, who served as something of a mentor to Rosenberg and to his ideology. Arriving in Munich, he contributed to Dietrich Eckart's publication, the Völkischer Beobachter (Ethnic/Nationalist Observer). By this time, he was both an antisemite – influenced by Houston Stewart Chamberlain's book The Foundations of the Nineteenth Century, one of the key proto-Nazi books of racial theory – and an anti-Bolshevik. Rosenberg became one of the earliest members of the German Workers' Party – later renamed the National Socialist German Workers' Party, better known as the Nazi Party – joining in January 1919, eight months before Adolf Hitler joined in September. According to some historians, Rosenberg had also been a member of the Thule Society, along with Eckart, although Nicholas Goodrick-Clarke contends that they were only guests. The Völkischer Beobachter became the Nazi party newspaper in December 1920. Eckart was its first editor and after his bout with alcoholism, Rosenberg became its editor in 1923. Rosenberg was a leading member of Aufbau Vereinigung, Reconstruction Organisation, a conspiratorial organisation of White Russian émigrés which had a critical influence on early Nazi policy.

Rosenberg sympathized and identified with Talaat Pasha and the Committee of Union and Progress that carried out the Armenian genocide, also claiming that there was "a deliberately Jewish policy which had always protected the Armenians" and that "during the world war, the Armenians have led the espionage against the Turks, similar to the Jews against Germany".

== Pre-war years ==
In November 1923, after the failed Beer Hall Putsch, Hitler, who had been imprisoned for treason, appointed Rosenberg as the leader of the Nazi movement. Hitler remarked privately in later years that his choice of Rosenberg, whom he regarded as weak and lazy, was strategic; Hitler did not want the temporary leader of the Nazis to become too popular or hungry for power, because a person with either of those two qualities might not want to cede the party leadership after Hitler's release. However, at the time of the appointment Hitler had no reason to believe that he would soon be released, and Rosenberg had not appeared weak, so this may have been Hitler reading back into history his dissatisfaction with Rosenberg for the job he did.

On 1 January 1924, Rosenberg founded the Greater German People's Community, a Nazi front organization. Headquartered in Munich, it was largely limited to Bavaria, the birthplace of National Socialism, had no substantial presence outside that State and became a haven for Nazi Party members from that area. Prominent members included Max Amann, Phillip Bouhler, Hermann Esser, Franz Xaver Schwarz and Julius Streicher. Rosenberg, one of the least charismatic of the Nazi leaders and lacking in leadership qualities, was soon pushed aside by Streicher, a far more ruthless and abrasive personality, who was elected Chairman on 9 July 1924 with Esser, also a coarse, bullying sort, as his Deputy Chairman.

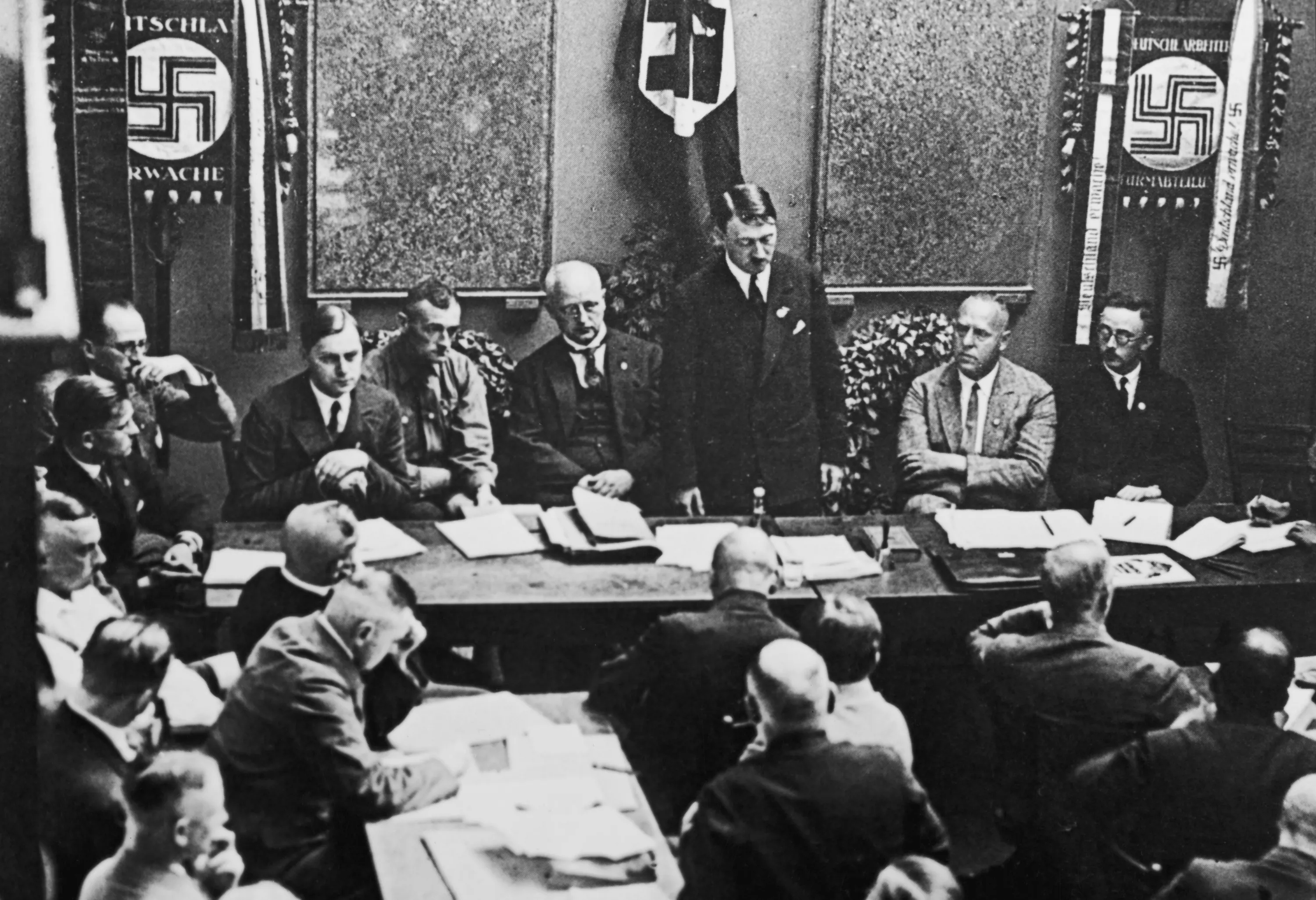
Adolf Hitler (standing) delivers a speech on the occasion of the refoundation of the NSDAP in February of 1925. Next to him from the perspective of the onlooker: On the right: Gregor Strasser and Heinrich Himmler. On the left: Franz Xaver Schwarz, Walter Buch and Alfred Rosenberg. Behind Hitler the Blutfahne (blood-flag), a central relique within the propaganda of the National-Socialists, can be seen attached to the wall.

Rosenberg was on the rostrum at the refoundation of the NSDAP in February 1925.

In 1929, Rosenberg founded the Militant League for German Culture. He later formed the "Institute for Research on the Jewish Question", the first branch of a projected Advanced School of the NSDAP, dedicated to identifying and attacking supposed Jewish influence in German culture and to recording the history of Judaism from a radical nationalist perspective. In 1930, he published his philosophical book of racial theory The Myth of the Twentieth Century (Der Mythus des 20. Jahrhunderts) which deals with key issues in the Nazi ideology, such as the "Jewish question". He condemned Islam in the book as well which he described as being against European races and as anti-Christian. Rosenberg intended his book as a sequel to Houston Stewart Chamberlain's above-cited book. Despite selling more than a million copies by 1945, its influence within Nazism remains doubtful. It is often said to have been a book that was officially venerated within Nazism, but one that few had actually read beyond the first chapter or even found comprehensible. According to Albert Speer, Hitler called it "stuff nobody can understand" and disapproved of its pseudo-religious tone. Contradicting this, other authors noted that Hitler considered it the most important book of party ideology. Rosenberg also played a key role in developing Hitler's belief in Jewish conspiracies by introducing him to The Protocols of the Elders of Zion.

Rosenberg was elected as a Reichstag deputy at the September 1930 parliamentary election as a representative of the Nazi Party electoral list. He would continue to serve in this capacity until the end of the Nazi regime, representing electoral constituency 33, Hesse-Darmstadt, from July 1932.

Rosenberg helped convince Hitler, whose early speeches focused on revenge against France and Britain, that communism was a serious threat to Germany. "Jewish-Bolshevism" became an ideological target for Nazism during the early 1920s.

While in Rome during November 1932, Rosenberg participated in the Volta Conference about Europe. British historian Sir Charles Petrie met him there and regarded him with great distaste; Petrie was a Catholic and strongly objected to Rosenberg's anti-Jewish and anti-Catholic sentiments. The following year, following the Nazi seizure of power, Rosenberg was named leader of the Nazi Party's Foreign Policy Office in April, and on 2 June 1933 he was named a Reichsleiter, the second highest political rank in the Nazi Party. In May 1933 Rosenberg visited Britain, to give the impression that the Nazis would not be a threat and to encourage links between the new regime and the British Empire. It was a notable failure. When Rosenberg laid a wreath bearing a swastika at the Cenotaph, James Edmond Sears, a Labour Party candidate, slashed it, later threw it in the Thames and was fined 40 shillings for willful damage at Bow Street magistrate's court.

In October 1933, Rosenberg was named as a member of Hans Frank's Academy for German Law.

On 27 January 1934, Hitler made Rosenberg the "Führer's Representative for the Supervision of Intellectual and Ideological Education of the NSDAP." This was the origin of the Amt Rosenberg, or Rosenberg Office, which was an official body for cultural policy and surveillance within the Nazi party. It was also known as the Reich surveillance office.

== Wartime activities ==
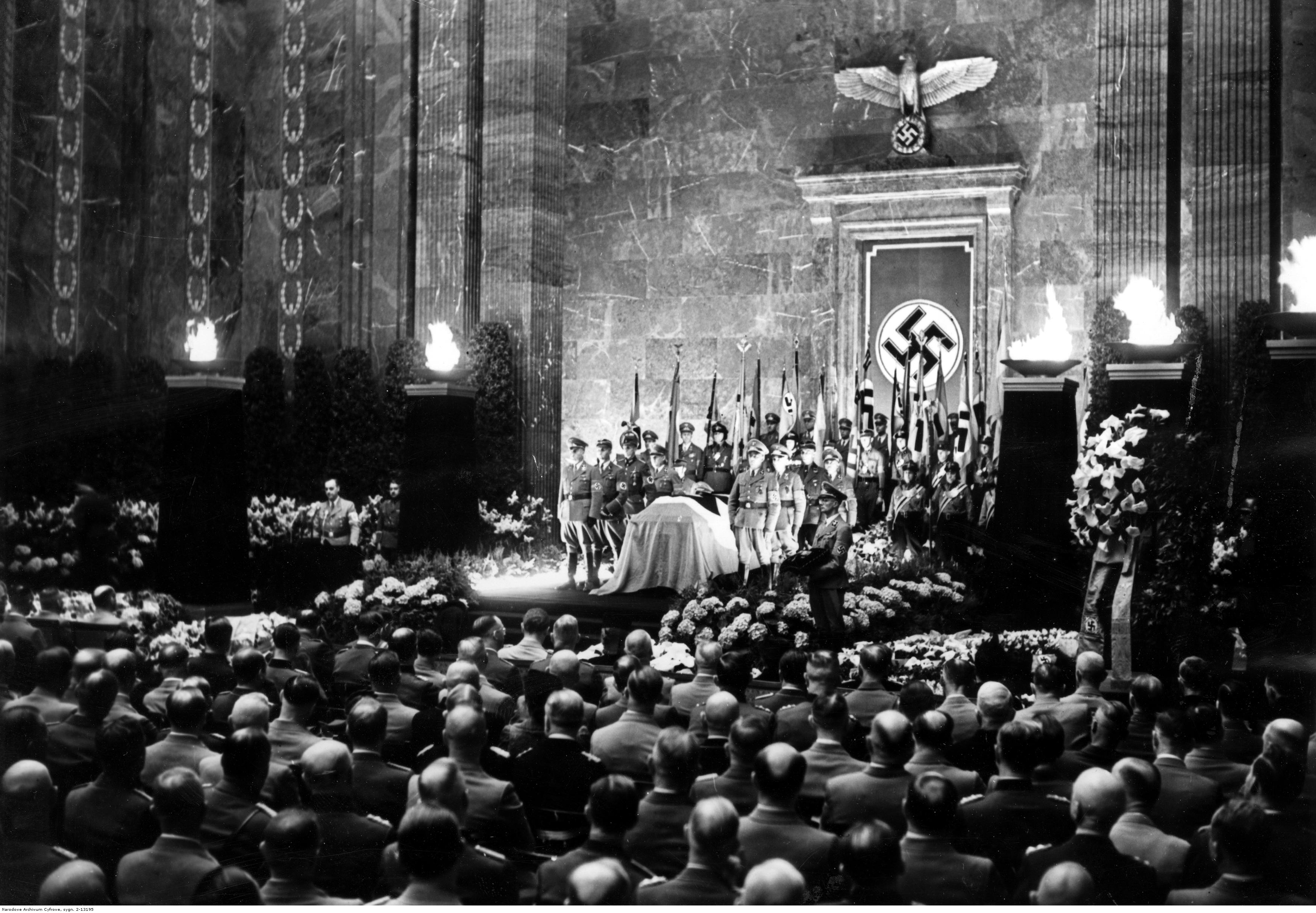
Reich Minister Alfred Rosenberg speaks during the 1942 funeral ceremony of Gauleiter Karl Roever.

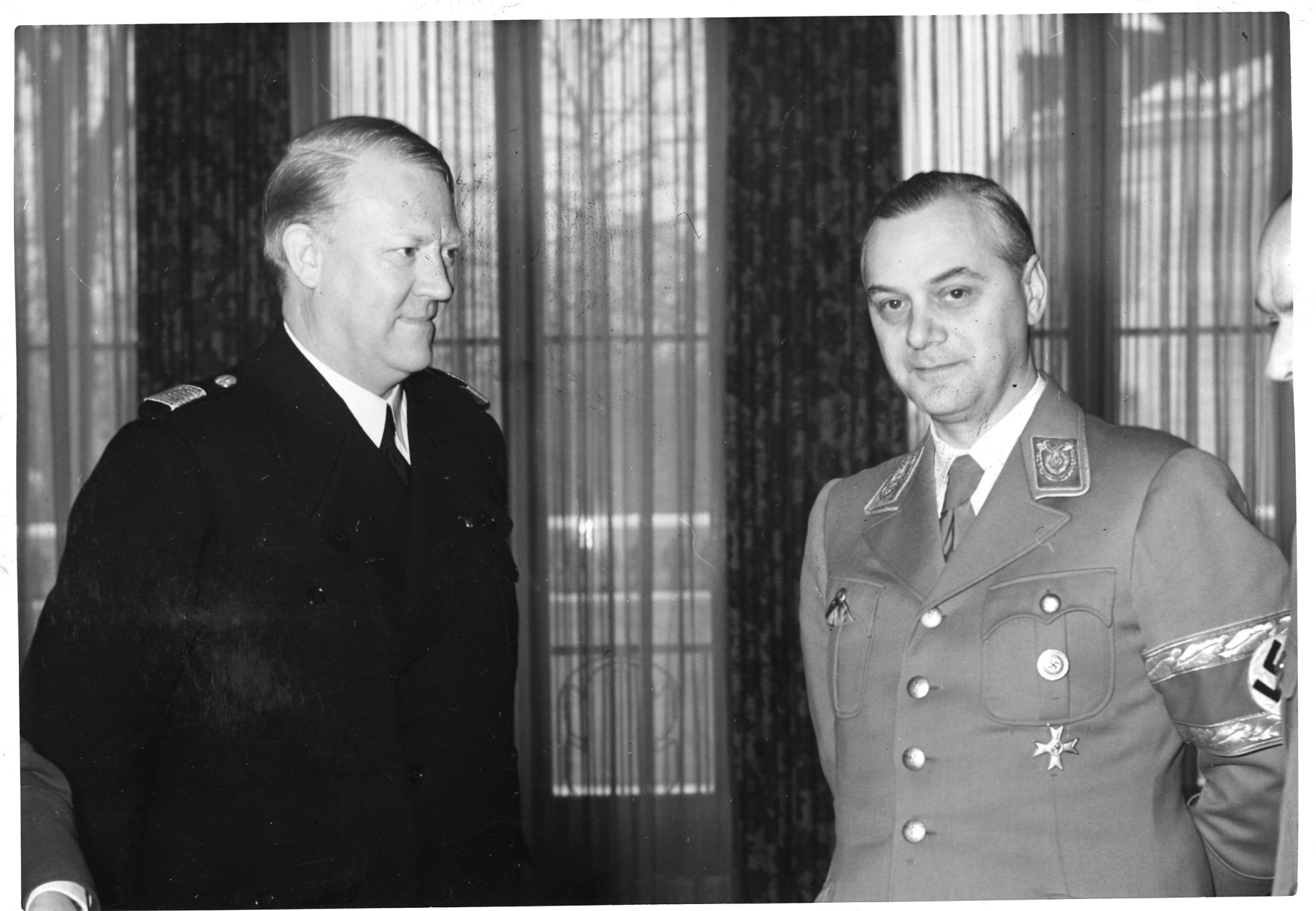
Rosenberg hosted in an official capacity such individuals as Vidkun Quisling.

In 1940 Rosenberg was made head of the Hohe Schule (lit. 'high school', but the German phrase refers to a college), the Centre of National Socialist Ideological and Educational Research, out of which the Einsatzstab Reichsleiter Rosenberg ('Reichsleiter Rosenberg taskforce') developed for the purpose of looting art and cultural goods. The ERR were especially active in Paris in looting art stolen from famous Jewish families such as the Rothschilds and that of Paul Rosenberg. Hermann Göring used the ERR to collect art for his own personal gratification. He created a "Special Task Force for Music" (Sonderstab Musik) to collect the best musical instruments and scores for use in a university to be built in Hitler's home town of Linz, Austria. The orders given to the Sonderstab Musik were to loot all forms of Jewish property in Germany and of those found in any country taken over by the German army, and any musical instruments or scores were to be immediately shipped to Berlin.

=== Reich Minister for the Occupied Eastern Territories ===
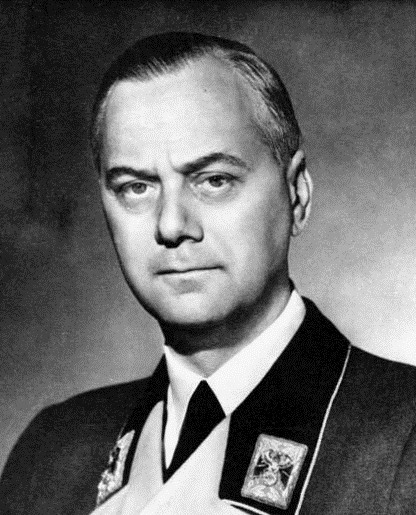
Alfred Rosenberg as Minister for the Occupied Eastern Territories

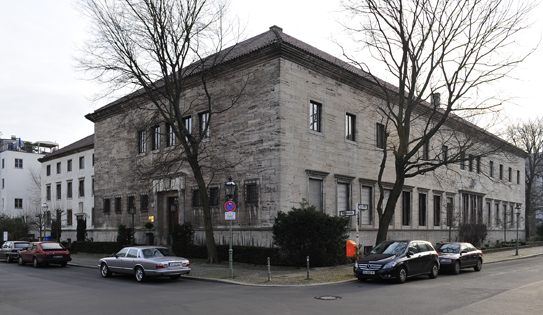
Former Nazi Ministry for Occupied Eastern Territories, Berlin (2014)

Following the invasion of the USSR, Rosenberg was appointed head of the Reich Ministry for the Occupied Eastern Territories (Reichsministerium für die besetzten Ostgebiete) on 17 July 1941. Alfred Meyer served as his deputy and represented him at the Wannsee Conference. Another official of the Ministry, Georg Leibbrandt, also attended the conference, at Rosenberg's request.

Rosenberg had presented Hitler with his plan for the organization of the conquered Eastern territories, suggesting the establishment of new administrative districts, to replace the previously Soviet-controlled territories with new Reichskommissariats. These would be:

- Ostland (Baltic countries and Belarus),
- Ukraine (Ukraine and nearest territories),
- Kaukasien (Caucasus area),
- Moskowien (Moscow metropolitan area and the rest of nearest Russian European areas)

Although Rosenberg believed that all of the peoples of the Soviet Union were subhumans because of their communist beliefs, such suggestions were intended to encourage certain non-Russian forms of nationalism and promote German interests for the benefit of future Aryan generations, in accord with geopolitical Lebensraum im Osten plans. They would provide a buffer against Soviet expansion in preparation for the total eradication of Communism and Bolshevism by decisive pre-emptive military action.

Following these plans, when Wehrmacht forces invaded Soviet-controlled territory, they immediately implemented the first of the proposed Reichskommissariate of Ostland and Ukraine, under the leadership of Hinrich Lohse and Erich Koch, respectively. The organization of these administrative territories led to conflict between Rosenberg and the SS over the treatment of Slavs under German occupation. As Nazi Germany's chief racial theorist, Rosenberg considered Slavs, though lesser than Germans, to be Aryan. Rosenberg often complained to Hitler and Himmler about the treatment of non-Jewish occupied peoples. He proposed the creation of buffer satellite states made out of Greater Finland, Baltica, Ukraine, and Caucasus.

During an 18 November 1941 press conference, he made the following statements about the Jewish question:

Some six million Jews still live in the East, and this question can only be solved by a biological extermination of the whole of Jewry in Europe. The Jewish Question will only be solved for Germany when the last Jew has left German territory, and it will only be solved for Europe when not a single Jew stands on the European continent as far as the Urals... And to this end, it is necessary to force them beyond the Urals or otherwise bring about their eradication.

At the Nuremberg trials he said he was ignorant of the Holocaust, despite the fact that Leibbrandt and Meyer were present at the Wannsee Conference.

=== Wartime propaganda efforts ===
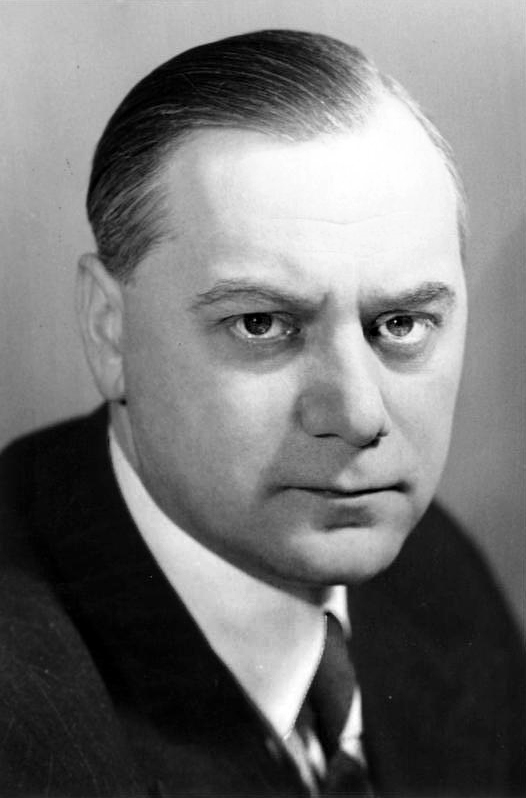
Photograph by Heinrich Hoffmann, 1941

Since the invasion of the Soviet Union intended to impose the New Order, it was essentially a war of conquest. German propaganda efforts designed to win over Russian opinion were, at best, patchy and inconsistent. Alfred Rosenberg was one of the few in the Nazi hierarchy who advocated a policy designed to encourage anti-Communist opinion among the population of the occupied territories. His interest here was mainly in the non-Russian areas such as Ukraine and the Baltic States; however, supporters of the Russian Liberation Army were somewhat able to win him over.

Amongst other things, Rosenberg issued a series of posters announcing the end of the Soviet collective farms (kolkhoz). He also issued an Agrarian Law in February 1942, annulling all Soviet legislation on farming and restoring family farms for those willing to collaborate with the occupiers. But decollectivisation conflicted with the wider demands of wartime food production, and Hermann Göring demanded that the collective farms be retained, save for a change of name. Hitler himself denounced the redistribution of land as "stupid".

There were numerous German armed forces (Wehrmacht) posters asking for assistance in the Bandenkrieg, the war against the Soviet partisans, though, once again, German policy had the effect of adding to their problems. Posters for "volunteer" labour, with inscriptions such as "Come work with us to shorten the war", hid the appalling realities faced by Russian workers in Germany. Rosenberg noted that many joined the partisans when volunteers for work details declined and the Germans resorted to force to acquire workers from the east.

== Trial, conviction, and execution ==
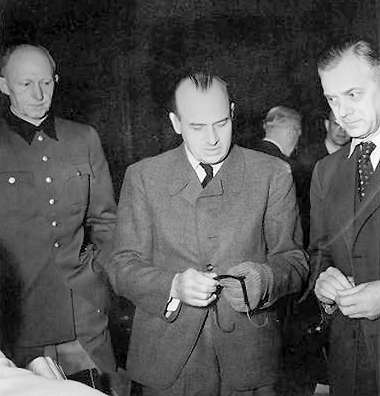
Rosenberg (right) at the Nuremberg trials, with Hans Frank (centre) and Alfred Jodl

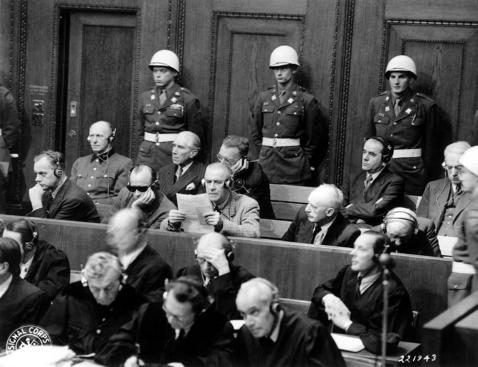
1946 Nuremberg courtroom: Rosenberg (front row, left)

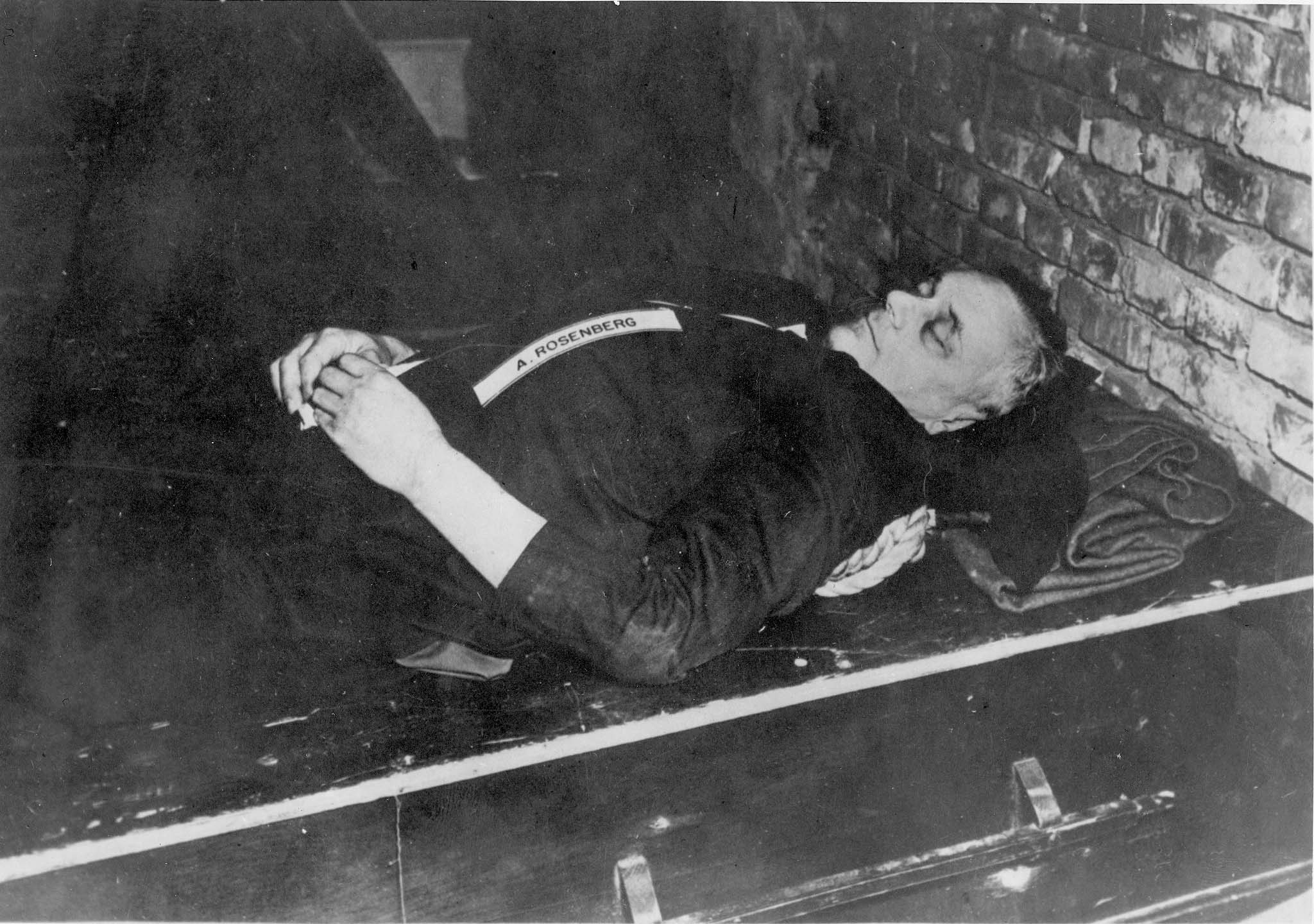
Rosenberg after his hanging

Rosenberg was captured by Allied troops on 19 May 1945 in Flensburg-Mürwik. He was tried at Nuremberg and found guilty of all four counts: conspiracy to commit crimes against peace; planning, initiating and waging wars of aggression; war crimes; and crimes against humanity. The final judgment against him named him one of the principal planners of the invasion of Norway and the invasion of the Soviet Union. It also held him directly responsible for the systematic plunder of the occupied countries of Europe, as well as the brutal conditions in Eastern Europe. During his trial he wrote his memoirs, which were published posthumously and with analytical commentary by Serge Lang and Ernst von Schenck.

He was sentenced to death and executed with other condemned co-defendants at Nuremberg Prison on the morning of 16 October 1946. His body, like those of the other nine executed men and that of Hermann Göring, was cremated at Ostfriedhof (Munich) and the ashes were scattered in the river Isar.

Throughout the trial, it was agreed that Rosenberg had a decisive role in shaping Nazi philosophy and ideology. Examples include: his book The Myth of the Twentieth Century, which was published in 1930, where he incited hatred against "Liberal Imperialism" and "Bolshevik Marxism"; furthering the influence of the "Lebensraum" idea in Germany during the war; facilitating the persecution of Christian churches and the Jews in particular; and opposition to the Versailles Treaty.

According to Joseph Kingsbury-Smith, who covered the executions for the International News Service, Rosenberg was the only condemned man who, when asked at the gallows if he had any last statement to make, replied with only one word: "No".

== Views and influence on Nazi policy ==
Hitler was a leader oriented towards practical politics, whereas, for Rosenberg, religion and philosophy were key and he was the most culturally influential within the party. Several accounts of the time before the Nazi ascension to power speak of Hitler as being a mouthpiece for Rosenberg's views, and he clearly exerted a great deal of intellectual influence.

The question of Rosenberg's influence in the Nazi Party is controversial. He was perceived as lacking the charisma and political skills of the other Nazi leaders, and was somewhat isolated. In some of his speeches Hitler appeared to be close to Rosenberg's views, rejecting traditional Christianity as a religion based on Jewish culture, preferring an ethnically and culturally pure "Race" whose destiny was supposed to be assigned to the German people by "Providence". But Hitler rejected Rosenberg's spiritual views on race and instead based his views on biology.

After Hitler's assumption of power, he moved to unify the churches into a national church which could be manipulated and controlled. He placed himself in the position of being the man to save Positive Christianity from utter destruction at the hands of the atheistic antitheist Communists of the Soviet Union. This was especially true immediately before and after the elections of 1932; Hitler wanted to appear non-threatening to major Christian faiths and consolidate his power.

Some Nazi leaders, such as Martin Bormann and Joseph Goebbels, were anti-Christian and sympathetic to Rosenberg. Once in power, Hitler and most Nazi leaders sought to unify the Christian denominations in favor of "positive Christianity". Hitler privately condemned mystical and pseudoreligious interests as "nonsense", and maintained that National Socialism was based on science and should avoid mystic and cultic practices. However, he and Joseph Goebbels agreed that after the Endsieg ('Final Victory') the Reich Church should be pressed into evolving into a German social evolutionist organisation proclaiming the cult of race, blood and battle, instead of Redemption and the Ten Commandments of Moses, which they deemed outdated and Jewish.

Heinrich Himmler's views were among the closest to Rosenberg's, and their estrangement was perhaps created by Himmler's abilities to put into action what Rosenberg had only written. Also, while Rosenberg thought Christianity should be allowed to die out, Himmler actively set out to create countering pagan rituals.

Lieutenant Colonel William Harold Dunn (1898–1955) wrote a medical and psychiatric report on him in prison to evaluate him as a suicide risk:

He gave the impression of clinging to his own theories in a fanatical and unyielding fashion and to have been little influenced by the unfolding during the trial of the cruelty and crimes of the party.

Fellow Nuremberg psychiatrist Douglas Kelley echoed that evaluation, "marveling" at Rosenberg's one-track mind on racial purity: "I was more than casually interested as a psychiatrist to find in Rosenberg an individual who had developed a system of thought differing greatly from known fact, who absolutely refused to amend his theories."

Summarizing the unresolved conflict between the personal views of Rosenberg and the pragmatism of the Nazi elite:

The ruthless pursuit of Nazi aims turned out to mean not, as Rosenberg had hoped, the permeation of German life with the new ideology; it meant concentration of the combined resources of party and state on total war.

=== Racial theories ===
As the Nazi Party's chief racial theorist, Rosenberg oversaw the construction of a human racial "ladder" that justified Hitler's racial and ethnic policies. Rosenberg built on the works of Arthur de Gobineau, Houston Stewart Chamberlain, Madison Grant and the Klansman Lothrop Stoddard as well as on the beliefs of Hitler. Rosenberg placed Blacks and Jews at the very bottom of the ladder, while at the very top stood the "Aryan" race. Rosenberg promoted the Nordic theory which considered the Nordic race the "master race", (Note: Rosenberg wrote: "No people of Europe is racially homogeneous, also Germany is not. According to the latest research, we accept five races all of which reveal perceptibly different types. But it is beyond question that the true culture bearer for Europe has been in the first place the Nordic race. Great heroes, artists and founders of states have grown from this blood." The Myth of the Twentieth Century (1930) p. 576) superior to all others, including to other Aryans (Indo-Europeans). He was also influenced by the Judeo-Masonic conspiracy theory promoted by the Catholic counter-revolutionary tradition, such as the book Le Juif, le judaïsme et la judaïsation des peuples chrétiens (1869) by Roger Gougenot des Mousseaux, which he translated into German under the title The Eternal Jew.

Rosenberg got the racial term Untermensch from the title of Stoddard's 1922 book The Revolt Against Civilization: The Menace of the Under-men, which had been adopted by the Nazis from that book's German version Der Kulturumsturz: Die Drohung des Untermenschen (1925).

Rosenberg reshaped the Nazi racial policy over the years, but it always consisted of Aryan supremacy, extreme German nationalism and rabid antisemitism. Rosenberg also outspokenly opposed homosexuality – notably in his pamphlet "Der Sumpf" ("The Swamp", 1927). He viewed homosexuality as a hindrance to the expansion of the "racially pure" Nordic population.

Rosenberg's attitude towards Slavs was flexible because it depended on the particular nation which he referred to. (Note: Rosenberg wrote: "The Czechs, for their part, were stratified by race into a Nordic-Slavic nobility, and lower orders of an Alpine Dinaric stamp, thus displaying that type which the modern Czech so plainly embodies." Page 108, "The one eyed maniacal Ziska of Trocnow, whose head in the Prague National Museum shows him to have been an eastern hither Asiatic type, was the first expression of this totally destructive Taborite movement, which the Czechs must thank for the extermination of the last remaining Germanic powers active within them, as well as the repression of all that was truly Slavic." The Myth of the Twentieth Century (1930) p. 109) (Note: Rosenberg wrote: "The entire east is diversified throughout; one will need to speak here of the Russian character, of the Germanised peoples of Finland, Estonia and Lithuania, whereat also Poland has developed its clearly outlined individuality." The Myth of the Twentieth Century (1930) p. 643) As a result of the ideology of "Drang nach Osten" ("Drive to the East"), Rosenberg saw his mission as the conquest and colonization of the Slavic East. In The Myth of the Twentieth Century, Rosenberg describes Russian Slavs as being overwhelmed by Bolshevism. (Note: Rosenberg wrote: "In the year 1917, Russian Man finally disintegrated. He fell into two parts. The Nordic Russian blood gave up the struggle, the eastern Mongolian, powerfully stirred up, summoned Chinese and desert peoples to its aid, Jews and Armenians pushed forward to leadership, and the Kalmuch Tartar Lenin became master. The demonry of this blood directed itself instinctively against everything which outwardly still had some honest effect, looked manly and Nordic, like a living reproach against a type of man whom Lothrop Stoddard described as 'subhuman'." The Myth of the Twentieth Century (1930) p. 214) Regarding Ukrainians, he favoured setting up a buffer state to ease the pressure on the German eastern frontier, while agreeing with the notion that Russia could be exploited for the benefit of Germany. During the war, Rosenberg was in favour of collaboration with the East Slavs against Bolshevism and offering them national independence unlike other Nazis such as Hitler and Himmler who dismissed such ideas.

Rosenberg criticised those who did not subscribe to his racial theories. For example, he attacked Fascist Italy for what he perceived as its incorrect and improper stance on race and Jewishness.

=== Religious theories ===
Rosenberg was raised as a Lutheran, but he rejected what he called "negative" Christianity later in life. Instead, Rosenberg argued for a new "religion of the blood", which was based on the supposed innate promptings of the Nordic soul to defend its noble character against racial and cultural degeneration.

In his 1920 book Immorality in the Talmud, Rosenberg identified Jews with the antichrist. (Note: Rosenberg wrote: "The hate of Jesus combined with an unfathomable lack of understanding for Jesus that is showing in the works of today's Jewry almost without disguise and culminates in the systematic Jewish Bolshevik persecution of Christianity in Russia goes back almost 2000 years. The personality of Christ was the strongest storm against Jewish nature, which the Jew has always felt and known and only Christian over-tolerance could deem it possible to build a bridge. There can be no peace between Christ and the antichrist; there can only be a winner." Original in German: "Der Haß, verbunden mit abgrundtiefer Verständnislosigkeit der Person Jesu gegenüber, der in den Erzeugnissen der heutigen Juden kaum mehr verhüllt zum Ausdruck kommt und in den planmäßigen Christenverfolgungen seitens der jüdischen bolschewistischen Machthaber in Rußland seinen Höhepunkt erreicht hat, dieser Haß dauert jetzt bald 2000 Jahre unverändert fort. Die Persönlichkeit Christi ist der stärkste Ansturm gegen jüdisches Wesen; das hat der Jude von jeher gefühlt und gewußt, einzig christliche Übertoleranz könnte glauben, hier eine Brücke schlagen zu können. Frieden kann es zwischen Christ und Antichrist nicht geben; es siegt entweder der eine oder der andere." Rosenberg, Alfred (1943) [1920] Unmoral im Talmud. Franz Eher Verlag, p. 19) He rejected negative Christianity because of its universality, for its doctrine of original sin (as he believed that all ethnic Germans were born noble), and for its teachings on the immortality of the soul, saying, "indeed, absorbing Christianity enfeebled our people." Publicly, Rosenberg affected to deplore Christianity's degeneration owing to its Jewish influence. He took inspiration from Houston Stewart Chamberlain's ideas and condemned what he called "Negative Christianity" (which was conventional Christianity preached by Protestantism and Catholicism), instead Rosenberg was arguing for a so-called "Positive" Christianity (Note: Rosenberg wrote: "From the description of Jesus one can select very different features. His personality often makes its appearance as soft and pitying, then, again, bluff and rough. But it is always supported by inward fire. It was in the interest of the Roman church, with its lust for power, to represent subservient humility as the essence of Christ in order to create as many servants as possible for this motivated 'ideal'. To correct this representation is a further ineradicable requirement of the German movement for renewal. Jesus appears to us today as self-confident lord in the best and highest sense of the word." The Myth of the Twentieth Century (1930) p. 604) (Note: Rosenberg wrote: "For this reason Jesus, in spite of all Christian churches, signifies a pivotal point in our history. He became the god of the Europeans, yet, not seldom did he appear in a repellent distortion. "If the concentrated feeling of personality which built Gothic cathedrals and inspired a Rembrandt portrait penetrated more clearly into the consciousness of the general public, a new wave of culture would begin. But the prerequisite for this is the overcoming of the former statutory values of the 'Christian' churches." The Myth of the Twentieth Century (1930) p. 391) which was based on the argument that Jesus was not a Jew but a member of an Indo-European enclave which was resident in ancient Galilee who fought against Judaism. (Note: Rosenberg quotes Dr. Emil Jung referring to statements by the Syrian Christian preacher Ephraem (4th century): "Jesus' mother was a Danaite woman (that is, someone who was born in Dan), and he had a Latin as his father. Ephraem sees this to be not unhonorable and adds: 'Jesus thus derived his ancestry from two of the greatest and most famous nations, namely, from the Syrians on the maternal side and from the Romans on the paternal.'" The Myth of the Twentieth Century" (1930), p. 76) (Note: Rosenberg wrote: "Herder once demanded that the religion dedicated to Jesus should become a religion of Jesus. This was what Chamberlain strove for. A completely free man who disposed inwardly over the entire culture of our times, he has shown the deepest sensitivity for the superhuman simplicity of Christ. He represented Jesus as what he had once appeared to be: a mediator between man and god." The Myth of the Twentieth Century" (1930), p. 623)

Significantly, in his work explicating the Nazi intellectual belief system, The Myth of the Twentieth Century, Rosenberg cryptically applauds the early Christian heretic Marcion (who rejected the Old Testament as well as the notion of Christ as the Jewish Messiah) and the Manichaean-inspired, "Aryo-Iranian" Cathari, as being the more authentic interpreters of Christianity versus historically dominant Judaeo-Christianity; (Note: Rosenberg wrote: "It is characteristic of Roman Christianity that where possible it eliminates the personality of its founder, in order to put in its place the church structure of a rulership by priests." The Myth of the Twentieth Century (1930) p. 160) moreover these ancient, externally Christian metaphysical forms were more "organically compatible with the Nordic sense of the spiritual and the Nordic 'blood-soul'." For Rosenberg, the anti-intellectual, religious doctrine was inseparable (Note: Rosenberg wrote: "The ancient Germanic idea of god is likewise inconceivable without spiritual freedom. Jesus also spoke of the kingdom of heaven within us. The strength of the spiritual search already shows itself in the world wanderer, Odin, and it can be seen in the seeker and believer, Eckehart, and we see it in all great men from Luther to Lagarde. This soul also lived within the venerable Thomas of Aquinas and in the majority of the occidental fathers of the church." The Myth of the Twentieth Century (1930) p. 247) from serving the interests of the Nordic race, connecting the individual to his racial nature. (Note: Rosenberg wrote: "A keen observer has correctly remarked that the Jesus child of the Sistine Madonna is "frankly heroic" in gaze and posture (Wölfflin). That is aptly expressed except that the fundamental ground is lacking as to why the allegedly Jewish family had a heroic look to it. Here, only composition and color distribution, not "inwardness" and "dedication", are determining. These are the prerequisites to the success of a formative will, once again, the racial ideal of beauty. To see in place of the light-brown haired, light skinned Jesus child a blue black, woolly haired, brown skinned Jew boy would be an impossibility. Equally, we cannot think of a Jewish Mother of God next to the holy, even if the latter had the "noble face" of an Offenbach or Disraeli." The Myth of the Twentieth Century (1930) p. 297) Rosenberg stated that "The general ideas of the Roman and of the Protestant churches are negative Christianity and do not, therefore, accord with our (German) soul." (Note: Rosenberg wrote: "The Jewish idea of the "slave of god", one who receives mercy from an arbitrary, absolutist god, has thus passed over to Rome and Wittenberg, and can be attributed to Paul as the actual creator of this doctrine, which is to say that our churches are not Christian but Pauline. Jesus unquestionably praised the One-Being with god. This was his redemption, his goal. He did not preach a condescending granting of mercy from an almighty being in the face of which even the greatest human soul represented a pure nothingness. This doctrine of mercy is naturally very welcome to every church. With such misinterpretation the church and its leaders appear as the "representatives of god". Consequently, they could acquire power by granting mercy through their magic hands." The Myth of the Twentieth Century (1930) p. 237) His support for Martin Luther as a great German figure was always ambivalent. (Note: Rosenberg wrote: "Now we may certainly also say that the love of Jesus Christ has been the love of one who is conscious of his aristocracy of soul and of his strong personality. Jesus sacrificed himself as a master, not as a servant ... And also Martin Luther knew only too well, what he said, when shortly before his death he wrote 'These three words, free – Christian – German, are to the pope and the Roman court nothing but mere poison, death, devil and hell. They can neither suffer, see nor hear them. Nothing else will come of it, that is certain.'" (Against the papacy donated by the devil in Rome, 1645) The Myth of the Twentieth Century (1930) p. 622) (Note: Rosenberg wrote: "In all seriousness, the Cosmic God was said to be identical with the dubious spiritual assertions of the Old Testament! Hebrew polytheism was elevated to a model of monotheism, and no deeper knowledge had come to Lutheran theology from the original magnificent Aryan-Persian idea of the world and the cosmic comprehension of God. In addition there appeared the revering of Paul, an original sin of protestantism, against which Lagarde, as is known, attacked by the entire official theology of his day, fought in vain." The Myth of the Twentieth Century (1930) p. 11) (Note: Rosenberg wrote: "However richly talented, however powerful and surpassing in forms it was, until the present, we have still not created a religious form worthy of us: neither Francis of Assisi, Luther, Goethe nor Dostoyevsky are founders of a religion for us." The Myth of the Twentieth Century (1930) p. 441)

In January 1934, Hitler appointed Rosenberg cultural and educational leader of the Reich. The Sanctum Officium in Rome recommended that Rosenberg's Myth of the Twentieth Century be put on the Index Librorum Prohibitorum (list of books forbidden by the Catholic Church) for scorning and rejecting "all dogmas of the Catholic Church, and the very fundamentals of the Christian religion".

Rosenberg has been described as an atheist by some people, including Henry F. Gerecke, the Lutheran chaplain who communed with some of the Nuremberg prisoners with Lutheran backgrounds, like Joachim von Ribbentrop and Wilhelm Keitel. Gustave Mark Gilbert, Rosenberg's prison psychologist during his trial, reports that Rosenberg described himself having "always been anti-Catholic" and criticised the Church's power. Due to his criticism of traditional Christianity, some polemical texts have called him a neo-pagan.

=== Published works ===
- Unmoral im Talmud, 1920, Ernst Boepple's Deutscher Volksverlag, Munich ("Immorality in the Talmud")
- Das Verbrechen der Freimaurerei: Judentum, Jesuitismus, Deutsches Christentum, 1921 ("The Crime of Freemasonry: Judaism, Jesuitism, German Christianity")
- Wesen, Grundsätze und Ziele der Nationalsozialistischen Deutschen Arbeiterpartei, 1922, Ernst Boepple's Deutscher Volksverlag, Munich ("Being, principles, and goals of the National Socialist German Worker's Party")
- Pest in Russland. Der Bolschewismus, seine Häupter, Handlanger und Opfer, 1922, Ernst Boepple's Deutscher Volksverlag, Munich ("The Plague in Russia. Bolshevism, its heads, henchmen, and victims")
- Bolschewismus, Hunger, Tod, 1922, Ernst Boepple's Deutscher Volksverlag, Munich ("Bolshevism, hunger, death")
- Der staatsfeindliche Zionismus. ("Zionism, the Enemy of the State"), 1922.
- Die Protokolle der Weisen von Zion und die jüdische Weltpolitik, 1923 ("The Protocols of the Elders of Zion and the Jewish World Politics")
- The Jewish Bolshevism, Britons Pub. Society, 1923, together with Ernst Boepple
- Der Mythus des 20. Jahrhunderts, 1930 ("The Myth of the 20th Century")
- Dietrich Eckart. Ein Vermächtnis, 1935 ("Dietrich Eckart: A Legacy")
- An die Dunkelmänner unserer Zeit. Eine Antwort auf die Angriffe gegen den "Mythus des 20. Jahrhunderts", 1937 ("The Obscurantists of Our Time: A Response to the Attacks Against 'The Myth of the 20th Century'")
- Protestantische Rompilger. Der Verrat an Luther und der "Mythus des 20. Jahrhunderts", 1937 ("Protestant Rome Pilgrims: The Betrayal of Luther and the 'Myth of the 20th Century'")
- Portrait eines Menschheitsverbrechers, 1949, with analytical commentary by Serge Lang and Ernst von Schenck ("Memoirs of Alfred Rosenberg: With Commentaries")
- Die Macht der Form, Unknown ("The Power of Form")

=== Diary ===
During the Nuremberg trials, Rosenberg's handwritten diary was translated by Harry Fiss, Chief of Documentation for the American prosecution. After its use in evidence during the Nuremberg trials, the diary went missing, along with other material which had been given to the prosecutor Robert Kempner (1899–1993). Kempner had taken the diary, along with several other documents pertaining to the Nazi prosecutions back to his home. This was considered to be against standard government procedure, and illegal. It was recovered in Lewiston, N.Y., on 13 June 2013 after a lengthy investigation by the United States Department of Homeland Security. Written on 425 loose-leaf pages, with entries dating from 1936 through 1944, it is now the property of the United States Holocaust Memorial Museum (USHMM) in Washington. Henry Mayer, the museum's senior archivist, and the son of a Holocaust survivor, was able to access the material and while "not given enough time to read [the] diary entry from beginning to end," he "could see that Rosenberg focused on certain subjects, including brutality against Jews and other ethnic groups and forcing the civilian population of occupied Russia to serve Germany." Meyer also noted Rosenberg's "hostile comments about Nazi leaders," which he described as "unvarnished." While some parts of the manuscript had been previously published, the majority had been lost for decades. Former Federal Bureau of Investigation agent Robert King Wittman, who helped track down the diary, said, "there is no place in the diary where we have Rosenberg or Hitler saying the Jews should be exterminated, all it said was 'move them out of Europe'". The New York Times said of the search for the missing manuscript that "the tangled journey of the diary could itself be the subject of a television mini-series." Since the end of 2013, the USHMM has shown the 425-page document (photos and transcripts) on its homepage.

== Personal life ==
Rosenberg was married twice. In 1915, he married Hilda Leesmann, an ethnic Estonian; they divorced in 1923. Two years later, in 1925 he married Hedwig Kramer, to whom he remained wed until his execution by the Allies. He and Kramer had two children: a son who died in infancy and a daughter, Irene, who was born in 1930. His wife died in 1947.

== See also ==
- Antisemitism
- Myth of the Twentieth Century
- Nordische Gesellschaft
- Racism
- Kirchenkampf
