= Franz Ritter von Epp =

German general and Nazi politician (1868–1947)

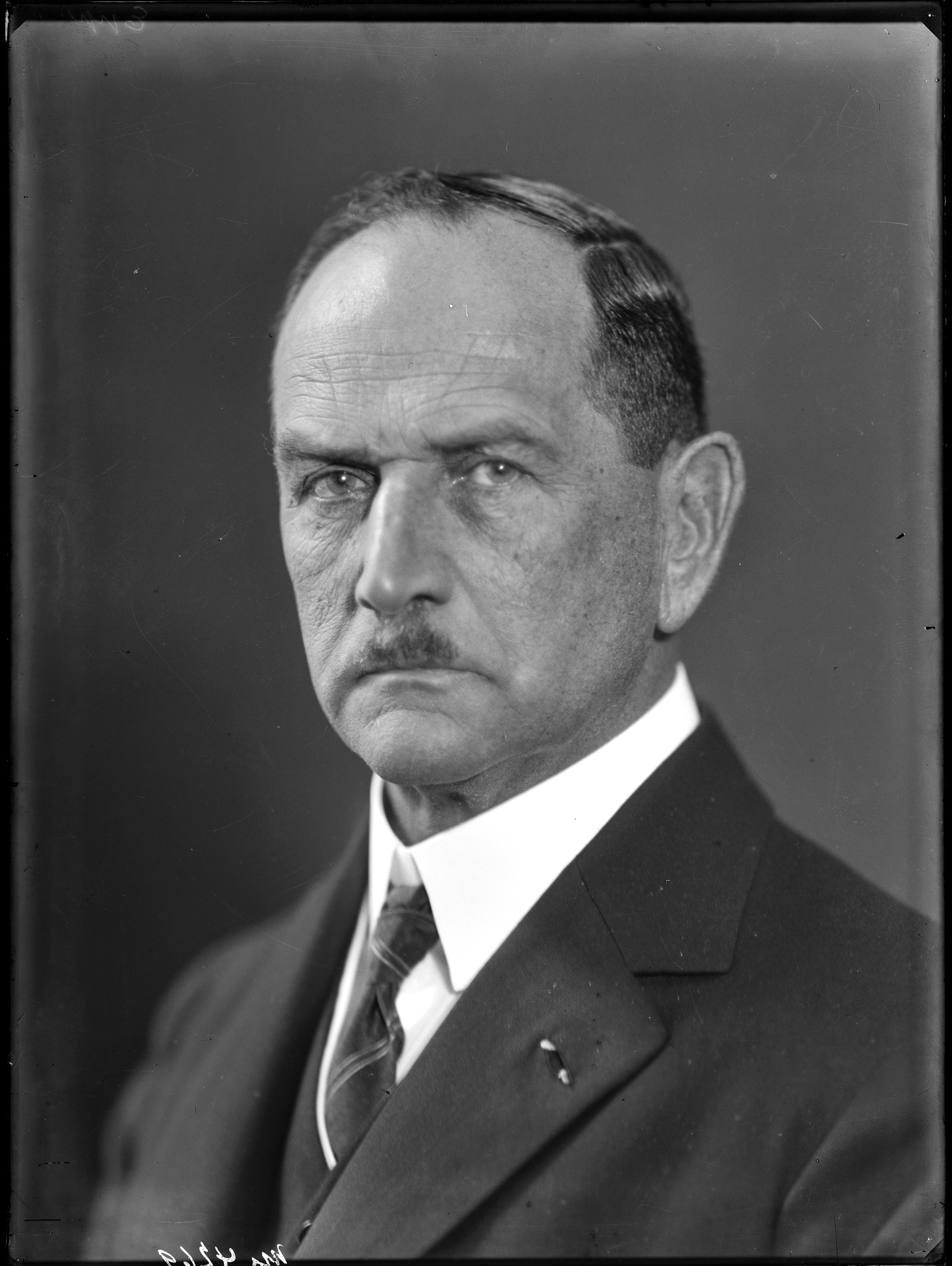
- Epp c. 1930's

Reichsstatthalter of Bavaria
- In office 10 April 1933 – 29 April 1945
- Preceded by: Office created
- Succeeded by: Office abolished

Reichskommissar of Bavaria
- In office 10 March 1933 – 10 April 1933
- Preceded by: Office established
- Succeeded by: Office abolished

Reichsleiter
- In office 31 August 1933 – 29 April 1945

Member of the Reichstag
- In office 20 May 1928 – 8 May 1945

Personal details
- Born: 16 October 1868 Munich, Kingdom of Bavaria
- Died: 31 January 1947 (aged 78) Munich, Bavaria, Allied-occupied Germany
- Resting place: Munich Waldfriedhof
- Party: BVP; Nazi Party from 1928
- Occupation: Military officer

Military service
- Allegiance: Kingdom of Bavaria; German Empire; Weimar Republic; Nazi Germany
- Branch/service: Imperial German Army; Schutztruppe; Freikorps; Reichswehr
- Years of service: 1887–1923
- Rank: General der Infanterie
- Commands: Royal Bavarian Infantry Lifeguards Regiment
- Battles/wars: Boxer Rebellion; Herero and Nama genocide World War I: Battles of the Isonzo
- Awards: Pour le Mérite; Military Order of Max Joseph

Franz Ritter von Epp (born Franz Epp; from 1918 as Ritter von Epp; 16 October 1868 – 31 January 1947) (Note: Epp's death date is often erroneously given as 31 December 1946. According to Lilla, Staatsminister, this error was replicated from the Neue Deutsche Biographie. The correct date, 31 January 1947, is confirmed by Epp's death certificate in the civil registry of Munich.) was a German general and politician who started his military career in the Bavarian Army. Successful wartime military service earned him a knighthood in 1916. After the end of World War I and the dissolution of the German Empire, Epp was a commanding officer in the Freikorps and the Reichswehr. His unit, the Freikorps Epp, was responsible for numerous massacres during the crushing of the Bavarian Soviet Republic. He was a member of the Bavarian People's Party before joining the Nazi Party in 1928, when he was elected as a member of the German parliament or Reichstag, a position he held until the fall of Nazi Germany. He was the Reichskommissar, later Reichsstatthalter, of Bavaria, and a Reichsleiter of the Nazi Party. He also was a Obergruppenführer in the Sturmabteilung, the Nazi paramilitary unit. During the Nazi era, Epp, who had participated in the Herero and Nama genocide as a young soldier, shared responsibility for the liquidation of virtually all Bavarian Jews and Romani people as the governor of Bavaria.

== Early military career and World War I ==
Franz Epp was born in Munich in 1868, the son of the painter Rudolph Epp and Katharina Streibel. He spent his school years in Augsburg and enlisted in the Bavarian Army at Munich in 1887. He attended the Bavarian War Academy from 1896 to 1899. He served as a volunteer in East Asia during the Boxer Rebellion in 1900–1901 and then became a company commander in the colony of German South-West Africa (now Namibia), where he took part in the Herero and Nama genocide.

During World War I, Epp served as the commanding officer of the Royal Bavarian Infantry Lifeguards Regiment in France, Serbia, Romania, and at the Isonzo front. For his war service, he received numerous decorations, of which the Pour le Mérite (29 May 1918) was the most significant. He was also knighted, being made Ritter von Epp on 25 February 1918, and received the Bavarian Military Order of Max Joseph (23 June 1916).

== Freikorps and Reichswehr years ==
After the end of the war, Epp formed the Freikorps Epp, a right-wing paramilitary unit mostly made up of war veterans, of which the future leader of the Sturmabteilung (SA), Ernst Röhm, was a member. This unit took part in the crushing of the Bavarian Soviet Republic in Munich, being responsible for various massacres. Epp joined the Reichswehr, rising to the rank of Generalmajor effective 1 July 1921.

Epp made available some 60,000 Reichsmarks to Adolf Hitler's mentor, Dietrich Eckart, for the acquisition of the majority of shares in Eher Verlag, the publisher of Völkischer Beobachter, which Hitler completed in December 1920, and for the maintenance of the newspaper, which became the daily mouthpiece of the Nazi Party. This was publicised in the Social Democratic press and Epp was questioned about the loan by the vice president of the Bavarian State Parliament Erhard Auer, which led some scholars to suggest that the money had come from secret army funds; Epp justified his actions in political terms and complained that his financial assistance was "blown up into an action of state".

Due to his right-wing political associations, he resigned from the army on 31 October 1923, at which time he was granted a brevet promotion to Generalleutnant.

== Career in the Nazi Party ==
Epp left the Bavarian People's Party and joined the Nazi Party on 18 May 1928 (membership number 85,475). On 20 May 1928, he was elected from electoral constituency 26 (Franconia) as one of the first 12 Nazi deputies to the Reichstag. He would continue to be elected to the Reichstag in each subsequent election throughout the Weimar and Nazi regimes to 1945, switching to represent constituency 24 (Upper Bavaria-Swabia) at the November 1933 election.

As the Nazi paramilitary SA expanded, it became an armed band of several hundred thousand men, whose function was to guard Nazi rallies and disrupt those of other political parties. Epp joined the SA in 1928 and served on the staff of its high command, attaining the rank of SA-Obergruppenführer in January 1933. Some of its leaders, particularly Röhm, envisioned the SA supplanting the regular army when Hitler came to national power. To this end, a department was set up under Epp called the Wehrpolitisches Amt (Army political office). Nothing came of this, as a distrustful Hitler eventually had the SA crushed and many of its leaders killed, including Röhm, in the Night of the Long Knives in the summer of 1934.

Epp served as the leader of the NSDAP Office of Military Policy from its founding in September 1932 to its disbandment in December 1935. On 31 August 1933, he was made a Reichsleiter, the second highest political rank in the Nazi Party. On 3 October 1933, he was made a member of the Academy for German Law. In May 1934, he became head of the NSDAP Office of Colonial Policy until its dissolution in February 1943. On 5 July 1935, Epp was granted a brevet appointment as a General der Infanterie in the German Army. A vice-president of the German Colonial Society since 1933, he became the Bundesführer of the Reichskolonialbund, its successor organization devoted to regaining Germany's lost colonies, from its founding in June 1936 until its dissolution in February 1943. In October 1938, he was made an honorary member of the Deutsche Akademie in Munich. At the start of World War II, he was named to the defense committees of the Bavarian military districts VII and XIII. His final appointment as an honorary senator of the Technische Hochschule München (today, the Technical University of Munich) came in February 1944.

== Reichskommissar and Reichsstatthalter of Bavaria ==
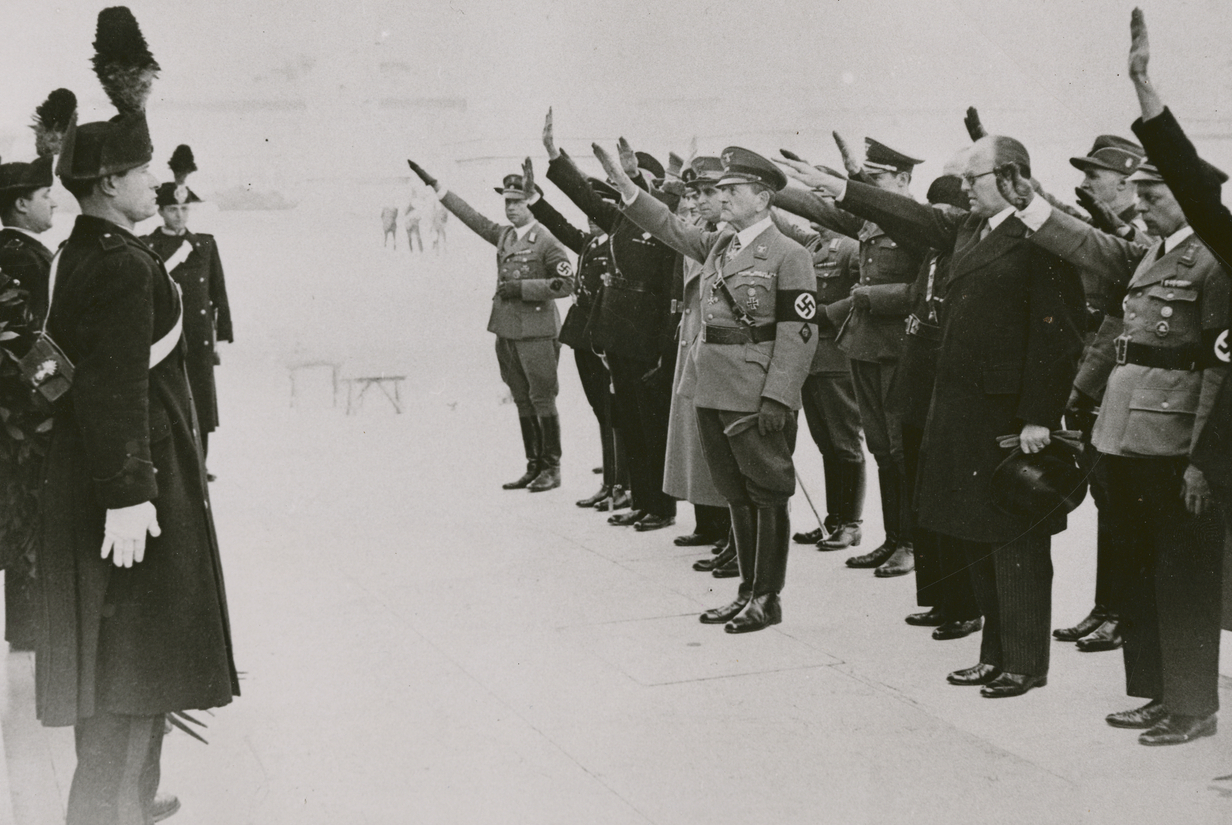
Epp and members of the German mission paying homage at the tomb of the Italian unknown soldier in March 1938

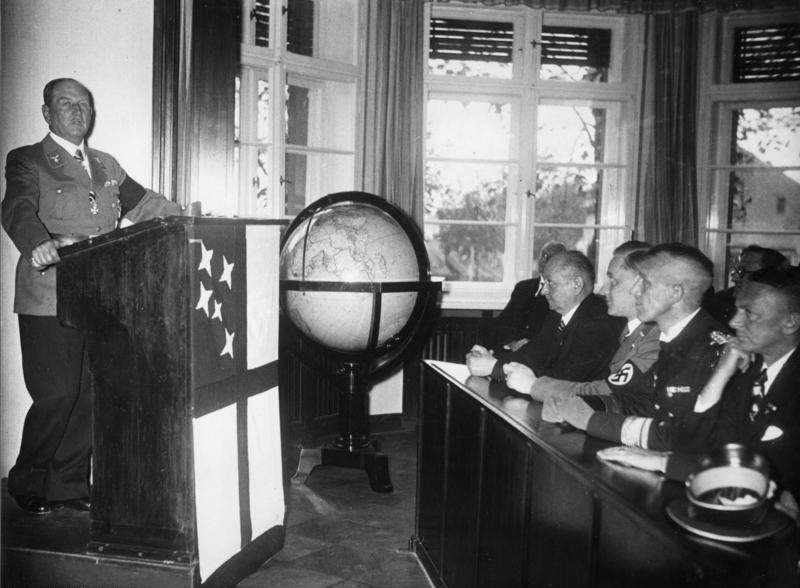
Epp opening a school for colonialism in October 1938

Epp's most notable historical action occurred on 9 March 1933, two weeks before the Reichstag passed the Enabling Act, which granted Hitler dictatorial powers. As part of the process of Gleichschaltung, on the orders of Reichskanzler Hitler and Reichsminister of the Interior Wilhelm Frick, Epp abolished the government of Bavaria and established a Nazi regime, with himself as Reichskommissar. On 10 April, Hitler appointed him the Reichsstatthalter (Reich governor) for Bavaria. In this position, he often clashed with Bavaria's Nazi Minister-president Ludwig Siebert. Epp's attempt to limit the influence of the central government on Bavarian politics failed. He retained his post as Reichsstatthalter until the end of the war, although he was relatively insignificant politically and became marginalized as a figurehead, with most power in the hands of Adolf Wagner, the regional Party Gauleiter.

== Arrest and death ==
Epp was arrested by the Gestapo on 28 April 1945, on the orders of Wagner's successor, Gauleiter Paul Giesler, for being associated with the Freiheitsaktion Bayern—an anti-Nazi group led by Rupprecht Gerngroß. However, he was soon released due to the intervention of Reichsmarschall Albert Kesselring. Epp had not wanted to be directly involved with the group, as he considered their goal—surrender to the Allies—a form of backstabbing of the German Army. The plan ultimately failed, with the resistance movement being crushed and over 40 of them being executed just hours before the liberation of Munich by the US Army.

Suffering from a heart condition, Epp was hospitalised at Bad Nauheim at the end of the war in Europe. On 9 May 1945, a clerk at the hospital alerted agents from the US Counterintelligence Corps that Epp was a patient there. Epp was arrested and sent to various prisoner of war facilities, including Camp Ashcan (formerly the Palace Hotel in Mondorf-les-Bains, Luxembourg) where major political and military figures of the Nazi regime were being held. He was later transferred to Munich to await trial at Nuremberg. He died in detention on 31 January 1947, at the age of 78, before he could be brought to trial.

Posthumous denazification proceedings were conducted against Epp in 1948. Initially classified as Group I (major offenders), on appeal his status was reduced to Group II (incriminated persons) on 7 February 1949.

== Decorations and awards ==
- Order of the Red Eagle 4th class with swords
- Order of the Crown 4th class with swords (24 October 1901)
- Pour le Mérite (29 May 1918)
- Knight's Cross of the Royal House Order of Hohenzollern with swords (5 May 1917)
- 1914 Iron Cross 2nd class (22 December 1914)
- 1914 Iron Cross 1st class (12 March 1915)
- Knights Cross of the Military Order of Max Joseph of Bavaria (17 November 1917)
- Officer's Cross of the Military Merit Order of Bavaria (14 February 1916)
- Military Merit Order of Bavaria 4th and 3rd class with swords
- Military Merit Cross of Bavaria 3rd class with crown and swords (11 September 1914)
- Officer's Cross of the House and Merit Order of Peter Frederick Louis of Oldenburg
- Military Merit Cross of Mecklenburg-Schwerin 2nd class (11 May 1918)
- Grand Cross of the Saxe-Ernestine House Order with swords on the ring
- Order of the Iron Crown of Austria-Hungary 3rd class with war decoration (26 September 1917)
- Military Merit Cross of Austria-Hungary 3rd class with war decoration (19 July 1917)
- Honour Cross of the World War 1914/1918 (1934)
- War Merit Cross 2nd class and 1st class with swords
- Knights Cross of the War Merit Cross with Swords (20 September 1943)
- China Commemorative Medal
- South West Africa Commemorative Medal (14 June 1907)
- Golden Party Badge
- Nazi Party Long Service Awards (10 and 15 years)
- Honour Chevron for the Old Guard (February 1934)
- Honor Dagger of the SA (February 1934)
- Sudetenland Medal 1938
- Anschluss Medal 1939
- The city of Passau named one of its streets Ritter-von-Epp-Straße, and it made Epp an honorary citizen on 18 May 1933. He also was accorded this honor by numerous other Bavarian cities in 1933, including Munich, Augsburg, Coburg and Rosenheim. These honours were all revoked by 1946.

== See also ==
- Herero and Nama genocide
- Reichskolonialbund
- Colonial Political Office of the NSDAP
- Research Materials: Max Planck Society Archive

== Sources ==
- Biography of Franz Ritter von Epp (in German)
- Franz Ritter von Epp– Record of his military career
- Miller, Michael; Schulz, Andreas (2015). Leaders Of The Storm Troops Volume 1. England: Helion & Company. ISBN 978-1-909982-87-1.
