= Reichsleiter Rosenberg Taskforce =

Nazi art looting organization active in France in WWII

- Einsatzstab Reichsleiter Rosenberg (German)
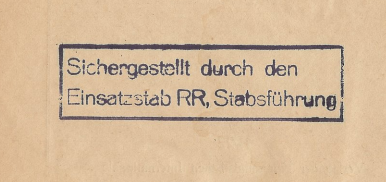
- Mark stamped on materials looted by the ERR

Organization overview
- Formed: July 1940
- Dissolved: May 1945
- Minister responsible: Alfred Rosenberg
- Parent Office: NSDAP Office of Foreign Affairs

The Reichsleiter Rosenberg Taskforce (German: Einsatzstab Reichsleiter Rosenberg or ERR) was a Nazi Party organization dedicated to appropriating cultural property during the Second World War. It was led by the chief ideologue of the Nazi Party, Alfred Rosenberg, from within the NSDAP Office of Foreign Affairs. Between 1940 and 1945, the ERR operated in France, Netherlands, Belgium, Poland, Lithuania, Latvia, Estonia, Greece, Italy, and on the territory of the Soviet Union in the Reichskommissariat Ostland and Reichskommissariat Ukraine. Much of the looted material was recovered by the Allies after the war, and returned to rightful owners, but there remains a substantial part that has been lost or remains with the Allied powers.

== Formation ==
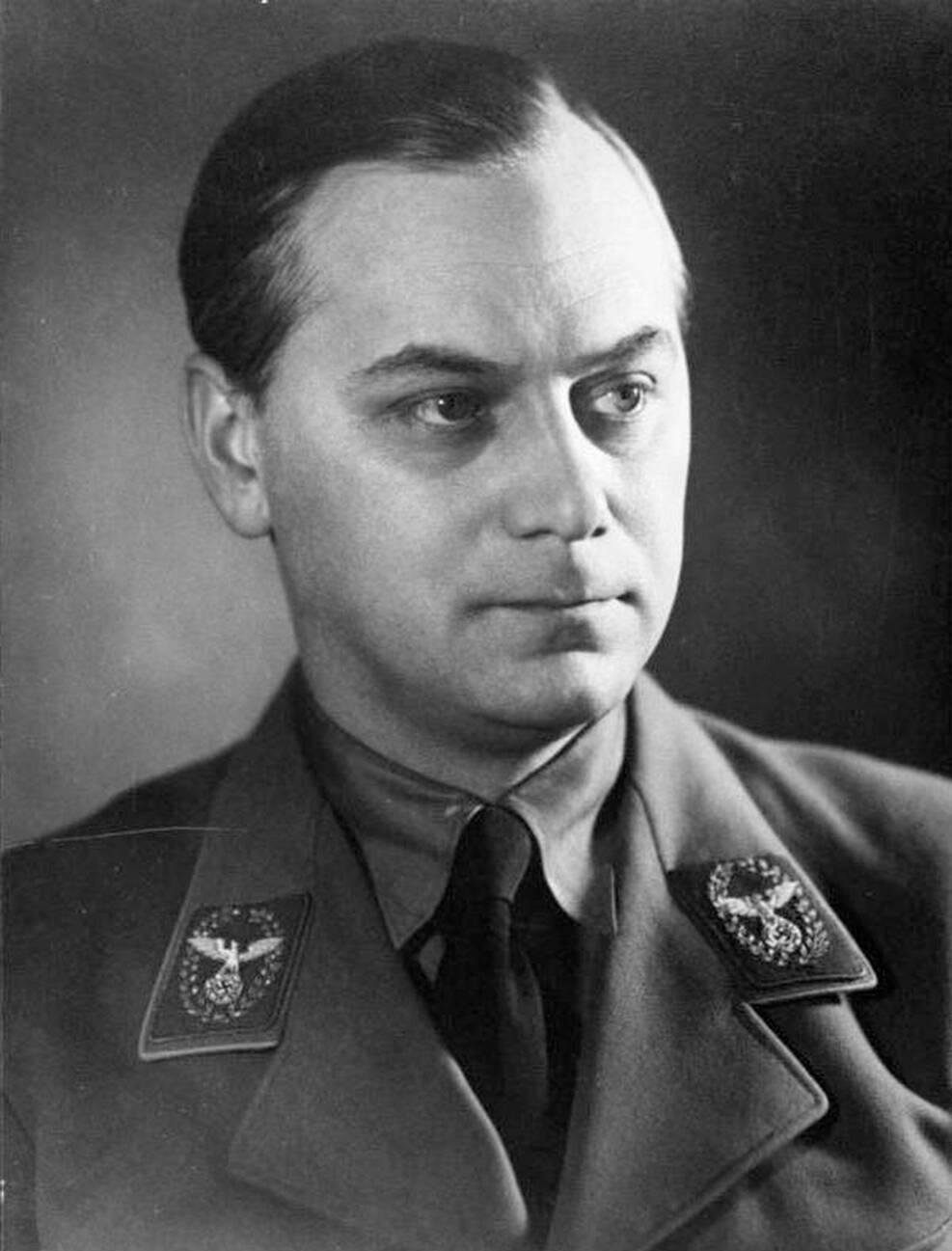
Alfred Rosenberg in 1939

The ERR was initially a project of Hohe Schule der NSDAP, a Nazi-oriented elite university, which was subordinate to Alfred Rosenberg. Rosenberg wanted it to be a research institute filled with cultural material on the opponents of the Nazi ideology. These included Jewish, Masonic, Communist and democratic organizations from throughout Germany and from the occupied countries. Plans to build monumental buildings for the university on the shores of Lake Chiemsee failed to materialize after the outbreak of World War II.

Shortly after the occupation of France the staff of the ERR joined the SS in the search for books, archival material, and huge stocks of artifacts that were in the possession of people of Jewish descent. Soon after the German Embassy in Paris and SS-Einsatzgruppen also began to steal the most valuable paintings from prominent national museums, galleries, and non-Jewish private collections. Rosenberg and his organization wanted to be involved in these art raids. He was able to get full authority from Adolf Hitler to be the only official art procurement organization acting in the occupied countries. For this reason, in a Führer Directive of 5 July 1940, Hitler authorized the ERR to confiscate:

- precious manuscripts and books from national libraries and archives;
- important artifacts of ecclesiastical authorities and Masonic lodges;
- all valuable cultural property belonging to Jews.

The "Einsatzstab Reichsleiter Rosenberg" was officially established in "Office West" in Paris and was divided into different functional departments. The ERR central administration was transferred to Berlin on 1 March 1941 where it became formal subdivision of the German Foreign Office.

The Nazis were so eager to acquire valuable masterpieces that art theft became the most important field of work of the ERR. In addition to art, many libraries were looted for the Institute for Research on the Jewish Question in Frankfurt, but especially for the library of the Hohe Schule. The operations staff had eight main regional task forces and five technical task forces (music, visual arts, history, libraries, churches). Raids connected with the ERR also plundered the belongings of people deported to Nazi concentration camps. Between April 1941 to July 1944, 29 convoys transported goods seized from Paris to Neuschwanstein Castle in Germany, the ERR's principal place of storage. Until 17 October 1944, as estimated by the ERR itself, 1,418,000 railway wagons containing books and works of art (as well as 427,000 tonnes by ship) were transitioned to Germany.

== Operations ==
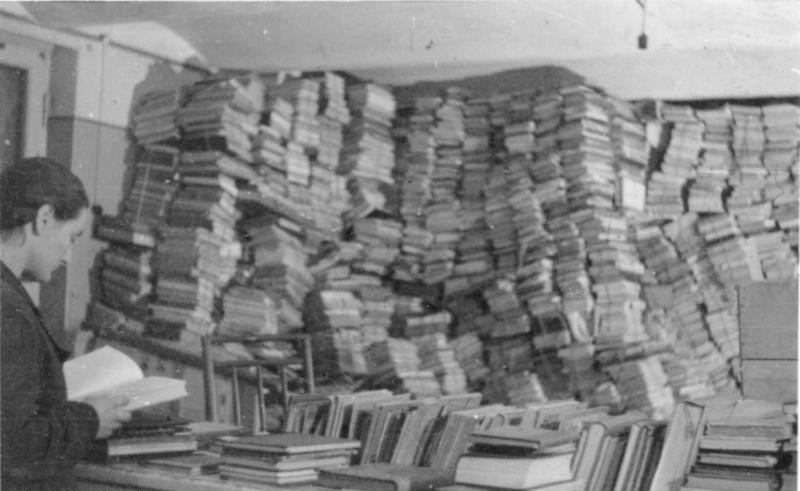
Looted books in Riga, November 1943

=== Belarus ===
"More than two hundred libraries of Belarus, especially the state (now national) library, suffered irreparable damage during the occupation. An associate of the national library, T. Roshchina, calculated that 83 percent of the library’s collection was plundered and destroyed. After the war, some six hundred thousand volumes from the library were found in Germany, Poland and Czechoslovakia, and were subsequently returned. About one million books, however, including rare and old printed volumes, have still not been located."

"Day by day for 26 months, the Hitlerites systematically destroyed one of the most ancient Russian cities, Smolensk. The Soviet Prosecution has presented to the Tribunal a document as Document Number USSR-56, containing the report of the Extraordinary State Commission of the Soviet Union. I shall not quote this document; but I shall only refer to it and endeavor, in my own words, to emphasize the fundamental points of this document, dealing with the reported theme now. In Smolensk, the German fascist invaders plundered and destroyed the most valuable collections in the museums. They desecrated and burned down ancient monuments; they destroyed schools and institutes, libraries, and sanatoriums. The report also mentions the fact that in April 1943, the Germans needed rubble to pave the roads. For this purpose, they blew up the intermediate school. The Germans burned down all the libraries of the city and 22 schools; 646,000 volumes perished in the library fires."

=== Belgium ===
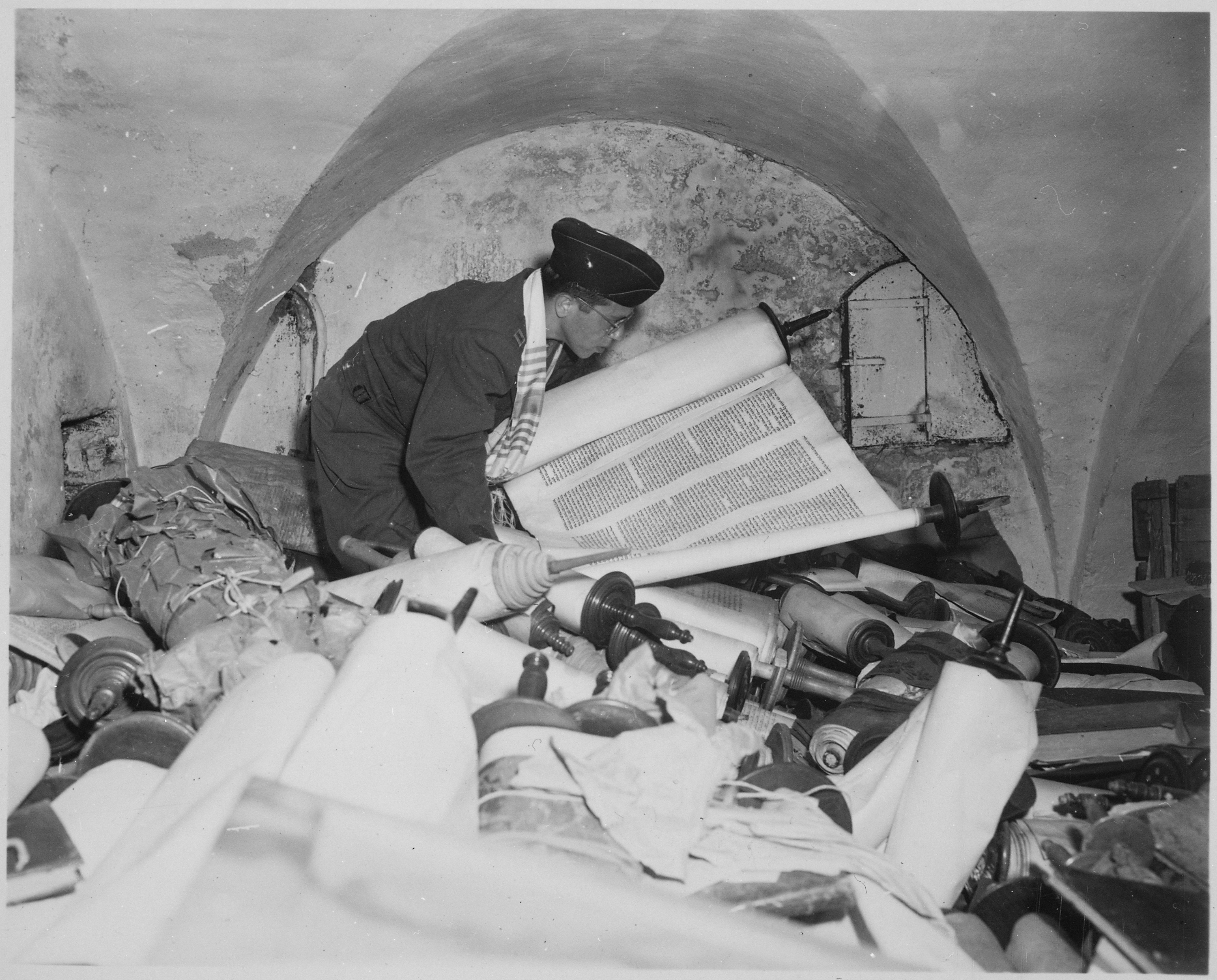
In the cellar of the Institute for Research on the Jewish Question in Frankfurt in 1945, U.S. Army Chaplain Samuel Blinder examines torahs stolen from every occupied country in Europe.

By the middle of 1941, most of the ERR work in Belgium concentrated on small collections in Jewish homes. Larger operations involved the Jesuit convent in Enghien involved removing 200 crates of books and archives, and looting the École des Hautes Études in Ghent, which involved transporting 56 crates of books. "Both institutions were considered outposts of French culture on Flemish soil and unfriendly to Nazism." The Jesuit collection was considered a treasure trove of information on the politics of Catholicism in Belgium, and of Catholic procedures to thwart the Germans. The Jesuit College in Leuven and the regional office in Brussels, for example, acted as a refuge for library materials.

"Libraries and archives sees as enemy and international were confiscated outright by the ERR, as indicated by the following three examples. The contents of the communist bookshop OBLA, Brussels, were sent to Racibórz, Poland. The records of the International Federation for Housing and Town Planning were confiscated and brought to Germany. A similar fate overtook the archives and library of the international Jesuit college at Enghien, which was called a "Zentrale der anti-Deutschland speziell anti-National-Sozialistischen Information" ("Center for anti-German and anti-National Socialist Information").

=== Czechoslovakia ===
"The 700,000 volumes of the Charles University Library in Prague were stolen as a unit."

A library was created in the Theresienstadt ghetto, about forty miles from Prague. Books were brought in by many of the people deported to this camp as part of their personal possessions, but also books from the collections of the Rabbinical Seminary Libraries of Berlin and Breslau, and the Jewish communities of Berlin and Vienna were also shipped there. Part of the German effort included having the prisoners translate and catalog many Hebrew books, to be added to the ERR "Museum of the Extinct Race" envisioned by Alfred Rosenberg. Almost 30,000 Hebrew and Judaica volumes had catalog cards created by the ghetto inmates.

In 1935, there were 17,148 public, school and university libraries in Czechoslovakia, having a book stock of 8,528,744 volumes. Many of these items were confiscated by the Germans, especially any Czech books dealing with geography, biography or history. Works by any Czech writers were taken away, many burned, most others taken directly to the paper pulp mills. Special libraries were devastated, and suffered a loss of about 2,000,000 volumes.

=== France ===
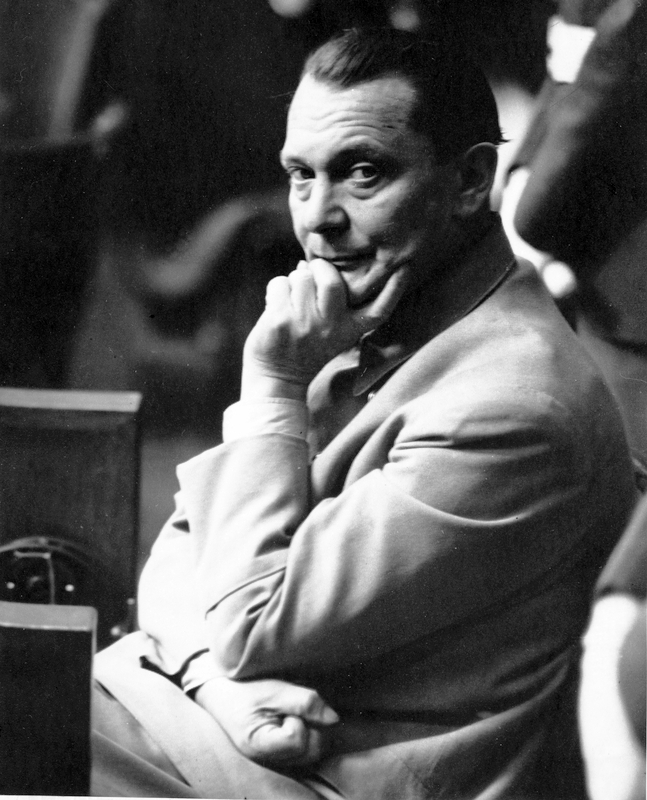
Göring at the post-war Nuremberg Trials

Georg Ebert, who was a member of Rosenberg’s NSDAP Office of Foreign Affairs, discovered that a Masonic grand lodge, the Grand Orient de France, had been abandoned in Paris. This was one of the most important Masonic grand lodge in Europe. Ebert personally guarded the building, with its library collection, museum and archives, until he could turn it over to the army. This was one point in the origin of the ERR, which eventually developed into a central headquarters in Berlin, with subsidiary offices Hauptarbeitsgruppen (Main Work Groups) in Paris, Amsterdam, Brussels, Belgrade, Riga and other cities.

"In January 1940, Hitler gave Rosenberg his task: to loot Jewish and Masonic cultural treasures, including synagogues, libraries, and archives in western Europe. By fall 1940, Hitler ordered Rosenberg to confiscate all Jewish art collections since these materials were now deemed "ownerless" by Nazi decree. Jews in France, as in most of Europe, were now labeled "stateless" and no longer had property rights. With France part of the German-occupied territories, the ERR and Rosenberg now fell under Hermann Göring's authority and control, with the Gestapo seeking out Jewish houses, apartments, and shops in the hopes of finding valuable pieces."

"Alfred Rosenberg reported to Hitler that his Einsatzstab had commenced confiscations in Paris by October 1940, with the assistance of the Service de Sûreté (S.D.) and the "Police Secrète Militaire (Geheime Feldpolizei)." The "Sonderstab Bildende Kunst" (Special Arts Staff), a section of the ERR, confiscated numerous Jewish art collections, often of international renown (for instance, the Rothschild collection). In the Netherlands, this Sonderstab did not seize much more than about a thousand works of art. The Sonderstab Musik, Kirchen, Osten, Bibliothekenaufbau der Hohen Schule und Rassenpolititische Fragen (Special Staffs for Music, Churches, the East, the High School Library and Race-political Questions) each fought for its own corner. By 1942, no fewer than 3,500 collections, libraries and archives had been ‘secured’ by the Hauptarbeitsgruppe Frankreich (Main Working Group, France) of the ERR- France having been divided into five districts.

The libraries of the Alliance Israélite Universelle (AIU) and the French Rabbinical Seminary (SIF) were high on the list of German locations to loot. The AIU had built a new library in 1937, including an eight story high tower and reading room, and boasting of 50,000 books. By March 1940, 647 crates of books had been removed from the AIU, and 243 crates of books from the SIF. A list by the ERR dated March 1941 indicated that 81 libraries had been looted in Paris alone, and a later supplemental list included another 30 libraries of Jewish, Masonic, socialist and émigré collections had been seized.

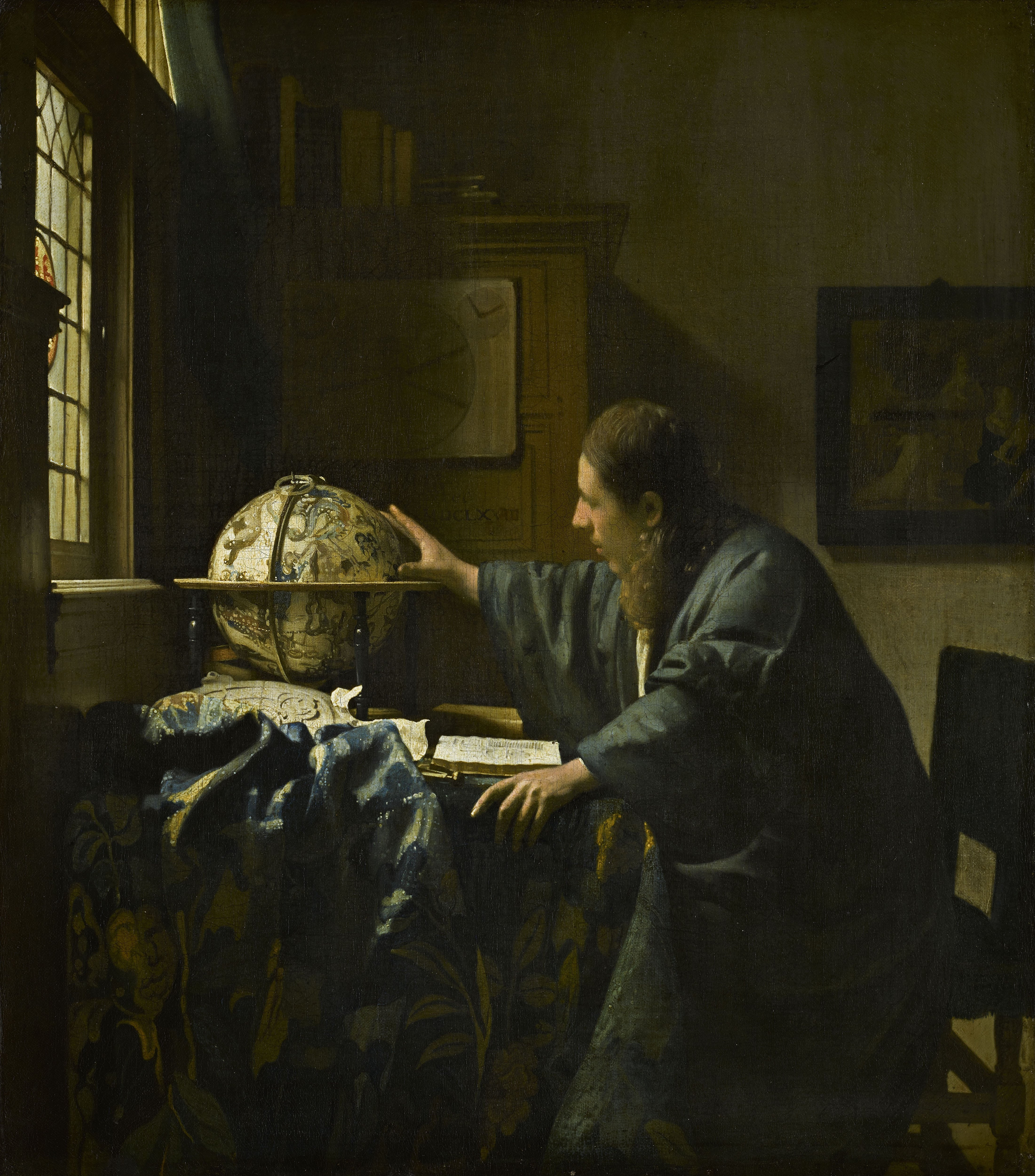
The Astronomer by Johannes Vermeer in 1668. Inherited in 1905 by Édouard Alphonse James de Rothschild (1868–1949) of Paris. Confiscated in 1940 by Reichsleiter Rosenberg Taskforce. Given to the Louvre Museum in 1982 by the Rothschild family.

"These albums were created by the staff of the Third Reich’s Einsatzstab Reichsleiter Rosenberg (ERR). This special unit was organized in the summer of 1940 under Reich Leader Alfred Rosenberg, initially to collect political material in occupied countries for exploitation in the "struggle against Jewry and Freemasonry." The ERR established its base of operations in Paris in July 1940 and on November 5, Hermann Göring assigned the ERR the responsibility for the confiscation of "ownerless" Jewish art collections. On November 18 of that year, Adolf Hitler ordered that all confiscated works of art be brought to Germany and placed at his personal disposal.

Before the war, Paris was the world's largest and most important art market. This was where well-off French, European and American collectors bought and sold their best pieces. From the beginning of the century, Jewish marchands d'art had established themselves as the best art dealers and experts, resultantly shaping and influencing global taste. Dealers included: the Wildensteins, where Georges Wildenstein dealt in Old Masters; the Bernheim-Jeunes who specialized in Impressionists and post-Impressionists painters, and in 1901 had opened the first Van Gogh show; and Paul Rosenberg, the contracted dealer of Picasso and Braque.

During the next several years, the ERR would be engaged in an extensive and elaborate art looting operation in France that was part of Hitler’s much larger premeditated plan to steal art treasures from conquered nations. Soon after the German occupation of France in 1940, the German military, and subsequently the ERR, focused their art confiscations on the world-renowned Jewish-owned art collections from families such as the Rothschilds, and the Veil-Picards, Alphonse Kann, and Jewish dealers such as the Seligmanns. According to the German ERR documents from 1944, the art seizures in France totaled 21,903 objects from 203 collections. There were 5,009 items confiscated from the Rothschild family collections, 2,687 items from the David-Weill collection, and 1,202 from Alphonse Kann’s collection. French officials, at the end of the war, estimated that one third of all art in French private hands had been confiscated.

==== Jeu de Paume Galerie ====
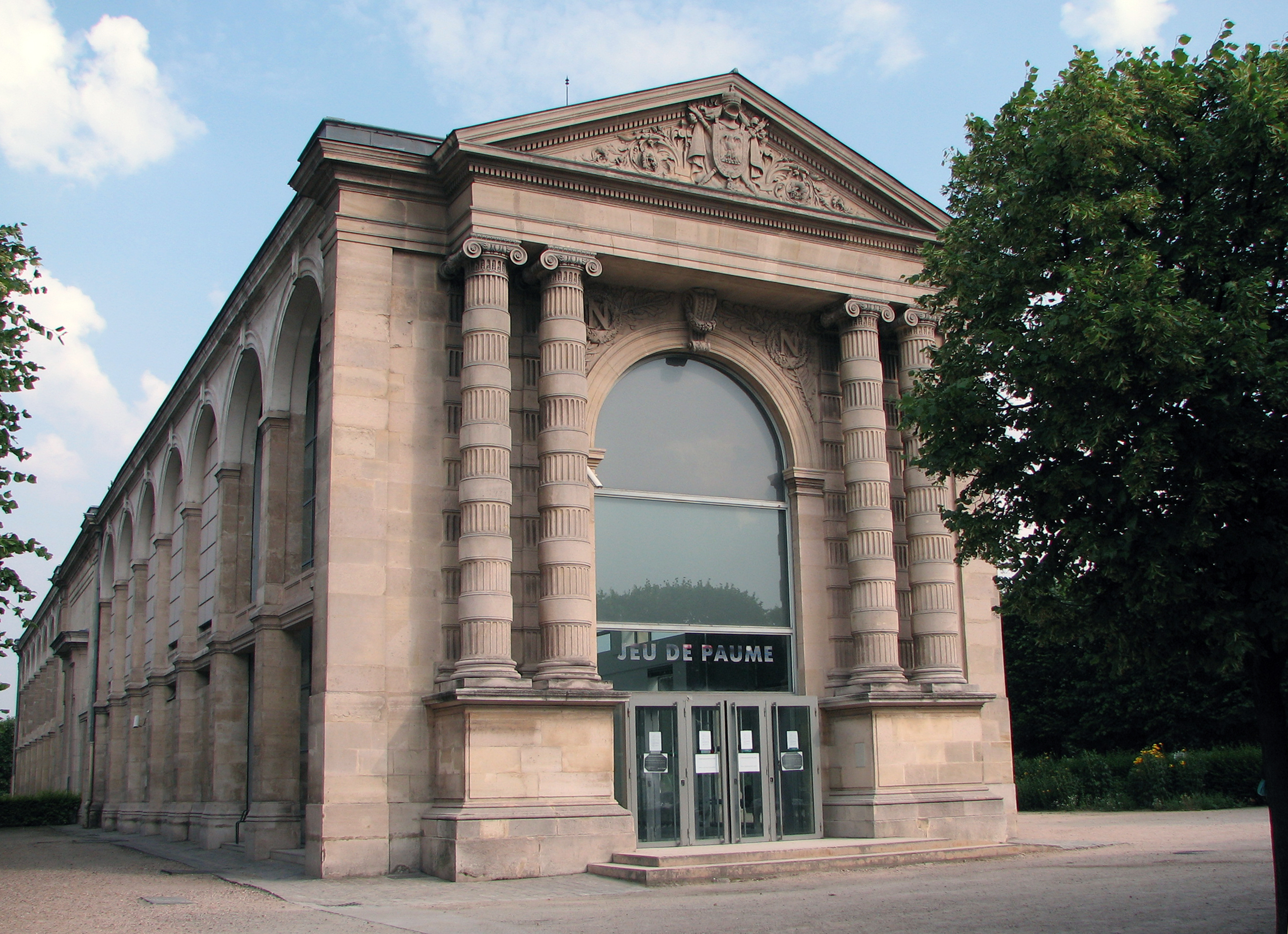
Galerie nationale du Jeu de Paume

All looted and confiscated art works were initially shipped by truck to the Galerie nationale du Jeu de Paume, where Nazi art historians, experts, photographers, maintenance and administrative personnel appraised, filed, photographed and packed the now decreed "ownerless cultural goods" for transport to Germany. The first shipment art works sent to Germany from Paris required 30 rail cars and consisted primarily of Rothschild paintings intended for the Führermuseum/European Museum of Art (EMoA) in Linz, Austria. Among the first fifty-three paintings shipped to Hitler was Vermeer’s Astronomer from the Édouard de Rothschild collection, today in the Musée du Louvre in Paris. As the ERR staff looted and catalogued the French collections, they created photograph albums specifically intended for the Reich Chancellery and Hitler in an effort to keep them apprised of their work in France, and more importantly, to provide a catalogue of items from which Hitler and his curators could choose art treasures for EMoA. A group of these photograph albums were presented to Hitler on his birthday on 20 April 1943, by Alfred Rosenberg to "send a ray of beauty and joy into [his] revered life." ERR staff stated that nearly 100 such volumes were created during the years of their art looting operation."

"The latest advice from authentic neutral sources said that the Gestapo had seized the libraries of all the Masonic organizations in France. The Bibliothèque Nationale (the French National Library) there upon put in a claim for these books, but the latest word was that the Germans declined to hand over them over, saying the material would be sent to Germany for purposes of study. The library of the Alliance Israelite in Paris, worth several million francs, also was said to have been seized and sent to Germany. From the Bibliothèque Nationale—one of the world's leading libraries—the Germans were reported to have received an inventory of manuscripts, rare books and similar material that had been stored elsewhere in France for security during the war. German officials, according to the information received here, have been exercising close supervision over the French publishing industry. They have also taken over the Maison du Livre de Français, the most important French book exporting agency."

So-called "degenerate art" was legally banned by the Nazis from entering Germany, and so once designated was held in what was called the Martyr's Room at the Jeu de Paume. Much of Paul Rosenberg's professional dealership and personal collection were so subsequently designated by the Nazis. Following Joseph Goebels earlier private decree to sell these degenerate works for foreign currency to fund the building of the Führermuseum and the wider war effort, Hermann Göring personally appointed a series of ERR approved dealers to liquidate these assets and then pass the funds to swell his personal art collection, including Hildebrand Gurlitt. With the looted degenerate art sold onwards via Switzerland, Rosenberg's collection was scattered across Europe. Today, some 70 of his paintings are missing, including: the large Picasso watercolor Naked Woman on the Beach, painted in Provence in 1923; seven works by Matisse; and the Portrait of Gabrielle Diot by Degas.

After the war, many of the books hidden by the Germans were collected by the Monuments, Fine Arts and Archives section of the American military government, and collected at the Offenbach Depot. There, many of the larger collections were identified and eventually returned to their owners. By the end of 1948, "the French regained the archives of the Paris bank of Rothschild Freres, the Libschutz Librairie de Paris, the library of the Alliance Israelite Universelle de Paris, the library of the Ecole Rabbinique de Paris, and the Bibliothèque de Chinon."

=== Greece ===
Greece was also visited by the ERR after the country’s fall in April 1941. A special unit headed by Dr. Johannes Pohl, chief of the Hebraica collection at the Frankfurt Institute’s library, appeared in Salonica, where he had Rosenberg agents seal the yeshiva collections, in which the city abounded. However, members of the community were able to hide or disguise many of the collections from the Germans. A later visit in September 1942 by a scholar named Maertsch, likewise resulted in no new additions to the Frankfurt library. However, a 1943 report does show that 10,000 volumes had been received from Greece.

Before the war, Greece was rich in libraries. The National Library, which included the Public and University libraries in Athens, contained more than 400,000 volumes. "Reports reaching American authorities in Cairo have told of the pillaging of libraries, laboratories and workshops of the Universities of Athens and Salonika ... A large part of the University of Athens library is reported to be lost. The libraries of three American colleges were reported to have been used as fuel in the central heating system used by the Germans."

=== Italy ===
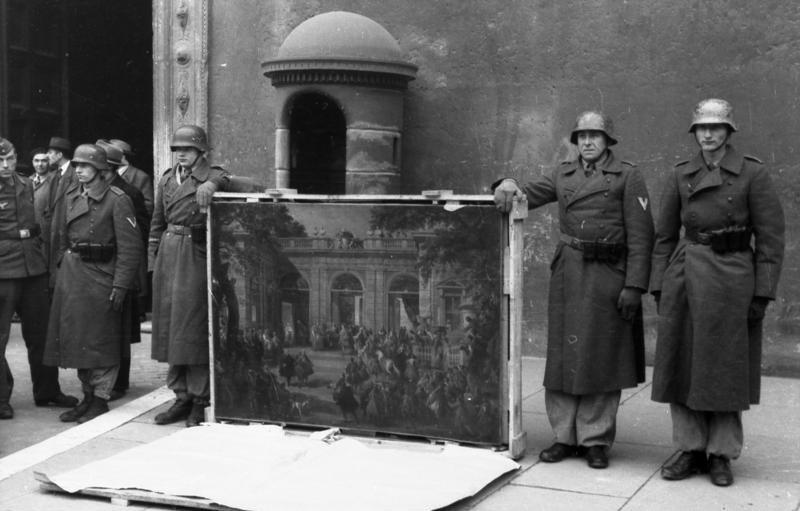
German soldiers of the Hermann Göring Division posing in front of Palazzo Venezia in Rome in 1944 with a picture taken from the Biblioteca del Museo Nazionale di Napoli

"The ERR were also active in the west. After the German occupations of Rome in 1943, ERR officers inspected the contents of the Roman Synagogue’s two great libraries, the Biblioteca della Comunità Israelitica and Collegio Rabbinico Italiano, which contained extraordinary collections gathered over the 2,000 year history of Jewish life in Rome. They demanded the libraries’ catalogs; just days before the first deportation of Roman Jews to Auschwitz, two specially ordered railcars destined for Alfred Rosenberg’s institute in Frankfurt were loaded with ten thousand books from these libraries."

"Two archaeological libraries, the Hertziana Library of History and Art, and the German Archaeological Institute’s library of the history, topography, art and customs of ancient Rome, were removed from Rome and taken to Germany by the Nazis. At the end of the war, the two library collections were discovered in two Austrian salt mines packed away in 1,985 wooden cases. The German Library’s collection was unharmed, but some of the Hertziana collection and the card catalog were damaged by water when part of the mine flooded. They were returned to Rome, where they became part of the Gallery of Modern Art, where both collections will be in the care of the new International Union for the study of Archaeology, Art and History in Rome."

After the war, many of the major collections looted from Italy were identified by the Monuments, Fine Arts and Archives service of the American military government and returned to their owners. The Collegio Rabbinico Italiano, the Kunsthistorisches Institut in Florenz, and the Deutsche Historische Bibliothek Rom were all returned, although not all were intact, to their owners in Italy. "These last two collections were seized by Hitler with the idea of re-establishing them in Germany."

=== Lithuania ===
In Vilna (Vilnius, Vilno, Wilno, etc.) the ERR set up a collecting point for Lithuania. Dr. Gotthard of the Berlin headquarters arrived in August 1941, and began looting the Strashun library. He conscripted the labor of two Gestapo prisoners, including A.Y. Goldschmidt, librarian of the Historic-Ethnographic Society. The grandson of the Library's founder committed suicide rather than assist the looting of the libraries. Dr. Johannes Pohl appeared in January 1942, and ordered that the city be made a collecting point for the region, and concentrated at the Yidisher Visenshaftlikker Institut (Institute for Jewish Research). Materials were brought in from the private collections from Kaunas, Šiauliai, Mariampolė, Volozhin and other towns, and included books from over 300 synagogues and personal libraries. Some of the Jewish workers were able to smuggle out and hide some of the most valuable books in the ghetto, which was stopped when the ghetto was liquidated in July 1943. The accumulated collection of over 100,000 volumes were separated into piles by century of publication, and about 20,000 were selected for shipment to Germany. The remaining materials were pulped to avoid storage and transportation costs, and to make a small profit. One incident involved an assistant of Dr. Pohl dumping out five cases of rare books in order to make room for an illegal shipment of hogs.

=== The Netherlands ===
"The Einsatzstab Reichleiter Rosenberg (ERR), established by Rosenberg in 1939, was represented in the Netherlands by an Amsterdam office. In 1940, the ERR confiscated all property belonging to the Freemasons, among which was the famous Biblioteca Klossiana. This library had been bought by Prince Hendrik (1876–1934) (Duke Henry of Mecklenburg-Schwerin), husband of Queen Wilhemina (Wilhelmina of the Netherlands), and had been presented by him to the order of Freemasons. It contained important incunabula and books on the occult, which were not available anywhere else in the Netherlands. Other parts of the library and the order’s archive were of importance as well. The library of the International Institute of Social History in Amsterdam was closed, and the ERR took over the building for its offices. In July 1940 the institute’s very important collection of newspapers and the library of approximately 160,000 volumes were confiscated. German arguments over their final destination kept the materials in Amsterdam until the winter of 1944, when they were transported to Germany in eleven ships. The International Archives of the Women’s Movement, established in Amsterdam in 1935, lost its whole collection after the institute was closed by the Sicherheitspolizei (Security Police) in June 1940. In August 1942, 499 crates containing books and archives taken from, among others, Jewish antiquarian book dealers and theosophical societies were transported to Berlin."

Most of the looted Jewish property, especially books, was sent to Rosenberg’s Institut zur Erforschung der Judenfrage in Frankfurt. Established in March 1941, the Institute served as the core research library for the planned Hohe Schule. Some of the other ERR research institutes that received looted books included the Institut für Biologie und Rassenlehre in Stuttgart, the Institut für Religionswissenschaft, and the Institut für Deutsche Volkskunde. In the Netherlands, where Seeligmann’s library was looted, the ERR enjoyed a monopoly on cultural property confiscation between 1940 and 1944. A particularly large number of books were seized, with an estimated value of thirty to forty million Reichsmarks. However, not all of those books were sent to the ERR’s research institutes. Certain collections, including Seeligmann’s, were sent to other Nazi agencies, such as the Reich Security Main Office (RSHA) in Berlin.

The RSHA was interested specifically in information about those they perceived to be the prime enemies of the state. Accordingly, the RSHA in Berlin received looted library and archival materials relating to "enemies" such as the Jews. The RSHA Office Seven (Amt VII), which specialized in ideological research, established a center for the evaluation of looted documents. By August 1943, it contained more than 500,000 catalogued volumes. Most of the Jewish materials collected by Amt VII related to Zionist groups, rescue agencies, communities, and cultural organizations. Materials pertaining to Jewish political, economic, cultural, and intellectual leaders were also collected. Seeligmann, who founded the Genootschap voor Joodsche Wetenschap in Nederland (Society for the Science of Judaism in the Netherlands) and served as president of the Dutch Zionist Organization, was of interest to the RSHA. By August 1943, his library became part of the Amt VII library and archive center.

=== Norway ===
In Norway, 150 school libraries and 50 public libraries were destroyed by the Germans. Most of these libraries were in the province of Finnmark, where there was widespread destruction during the evacuation of the German Army forces. The Norwegians did not burn the German propaganda works that had filled their shelves when the original Norwegian books were removed. These were kept for future generations to study the period of German occupation.

=== Poland ===
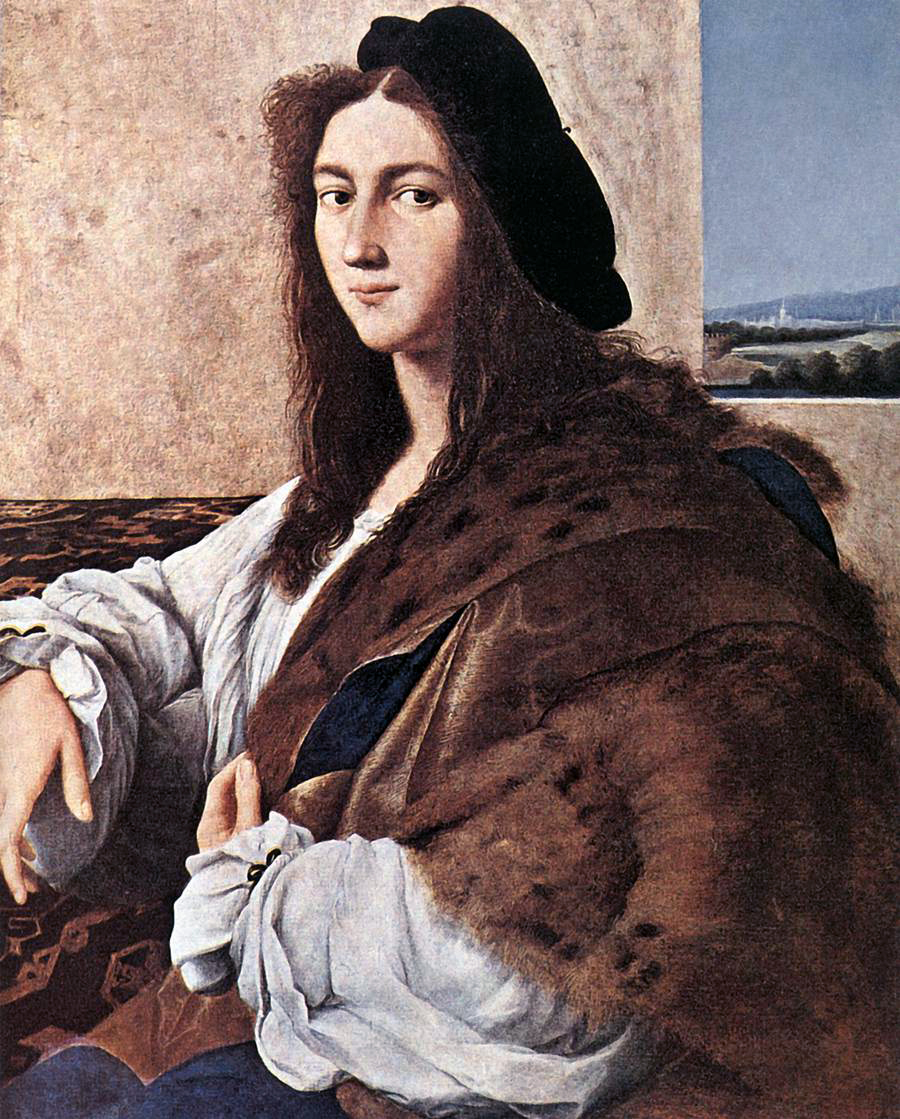
Raphael's Portrait of a Young Man was looted by the Germans from the Czartoryski Museum in 1939.

" ... From the very beginning of the establishment of the Staatsbibliothek Krakau, special importance was given to materials related to the natural sciences, mathematics, geography and medicine. In the fiscal year 1940–1941, the amount of money spent on book purchases was surprisingly high." The Germans recognized the value of the scientific collection, and from 1941 through 1944, 35,599 books were borrowed by 2,621 patrons, mostly German civil servants and military personnel. Polish civilians were not allowed access to the library during the occupation. Gustav Abb, the German overseer of libraries, decided to send much of the reference collection to Germany in 1944. "Abb decided to send the major part of the reference collection, as well as most of the books bought by the Staatsbibliothek to Germany (altogether about 25,000 volumes). [Polish] Librarians, charged with the task of filling boxes with books, tried to sabotage Abb’s orders. They hid a large number of books and stuffed boxes with old newspapers. Despite those heroic efforts to save the collection, the Germans were still able to send a great number of books to Adelsdorf (Adelin) in Silesia. Fortunately, after the war the library was able to recover most of the books that Abb had evacuated form the library." Later in the war, the main reading room was used as sleeping quarters for German soldiers, and other parts of the library were used as a hospital for Germans.

From the Frankfurter Zeitung, Wochen-Ausgabe, 28 March 1941: "For us it is a matter of special pride to destroy the Talmudic Academy which has been known as the greatest in Poland ... We threw out of the building the great Talmudic Library and carted it to market. There we set fire to the books. The fire lasted for twenty hours. The Jews of Lublin were assembled around and cried bitterly. The cries almost silenced us. Then we summoned a military band, and the joyful shouts of the soldiers silenced the sounds of Jewish cries."

=== Soviet Union ===
In the note of Vaycheslav M. Molotov [sic: Vyacheslav Molotov], People’s Commissar for Foreign Affairs, dated 27 April 1942, presented before the International Military Tribunal, it was recorded that the Germans burned the library of 40,000 volumes belonging to one of the oldest agricultural libraries in the U.S.S.R., the Shatilov selection station in the Orel district. Also submitted to the International Military Tribunal was the statement following: "There was no limit to the desecration of the Hitlerite vandals of the monuments and homes representing Ukrainian history, culture and art. Suffice to mention, as an example of the constant attempts to humiliate the national dignity of the Ukrainian people, that after plundering the Korolenko Library in Kharkov, the occupiers used the books as paving stones for the muddy street in order to facilitate the passage of motor vehicles."

"ERR dispatches note they had to abandon their offices before the removal of the materials on hand could be completed ‘due to lack of loading spaces’ and the fact that German artillery, located in the center of the city [Kiev], was firing continually over their heads. Still, they managed to send on both their paintings 9,279) and prehistoric materials, which had come from Kharkov, their own library and office furniture, and the materials collected by the Department of Seizures, amounting to some ten thousand books and nearly a hundred cases of Bolshevist paintings, documents and archives ... "

1941–1944 Soviet Union: As a result of the German invasion, heavy damage was done to Russian libraries. It has been estimated that more than 100 million books have been destroyed, mainly from public libraries.

"At Pskov, 1,026 church books were removed from the kremlin (fortress), including sixteenth- to eighteenth- century manuscripts and seventeenth century printed books. Nearly 35,000 volumes were removed from the Pskov pedagogical institute, including 25,000 works of Russian scholars. At Novgorod, the library of the historical museum which was "displaced", contained rare periodicals such as Russkaia rech’ of 1880 and Bibliograf of 1860. Books removed included editions of Voltaire of 1785 and Jean Jacques Rousseau of 1796. All in all, 35,000 volumes were removed. Unique editions of archaeology, including 51 books on the history of ancient Russia, were removed from the Novgorod library for the German professor Engel. Publications on ethnology were removed for Professor Thiele ... The above-mentioned Sonderkommando Künsberg was active in removing the czars’ libraries from the suburbs of Leningrad and the contents of museums and libraries from Rostov and Taganrog. In addition to the ERR, Künsberg’s clients were: the Reich Security Main Office; the geographic service of the ministry of Foreign Affairs; the State Library; the Slavic Studies seminar; and the Hermann Göring economic library."

Heinrich Himmler sent a secret message to the SS and Sicherheitsdienst (SD) units in order to ensure their cooperation with the main troops in the total destruction and devastation of the parts of Ukraine to be evacuated: "The aim to be achieved is that when the areas in Ukraine are evacuated, not a human being, not a single head of cattle, not a hundredweight of cereals, and not a railway line remains behind; that not a house remains standing, not a mine exists that is not ruined for years to come, that there is no well left unpoisoned. The enemy must really find a land completely burnt and destroyed."

== Partial postwar recovery ==
It is estimated that Germany looted three million books during the course of the war. More than one million of them were discovered by American forces at Hungen, Hesse, in May 1945. The books had been moved there from Frankfurt in early 1944, when the Allied bombing of the city threatened the collection. The books were moved back to the former Rothschild Library for cataloguing.

== Ranks ==
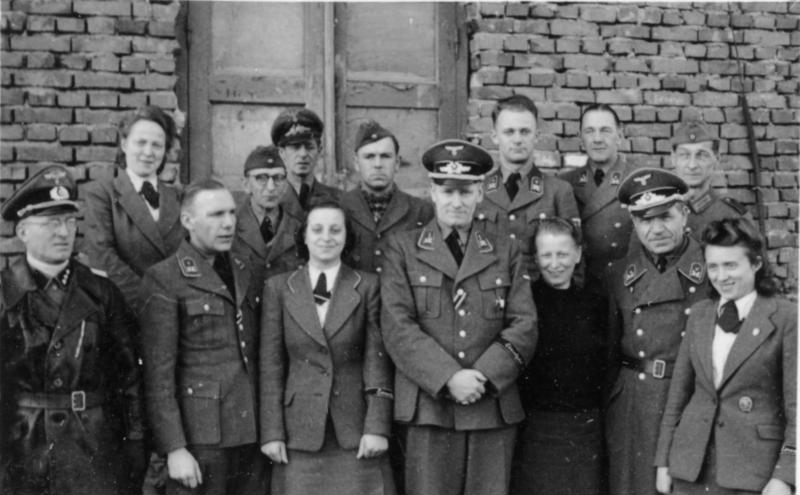
Male and female officials of the ERR among other uniformed personnel in Minsk.

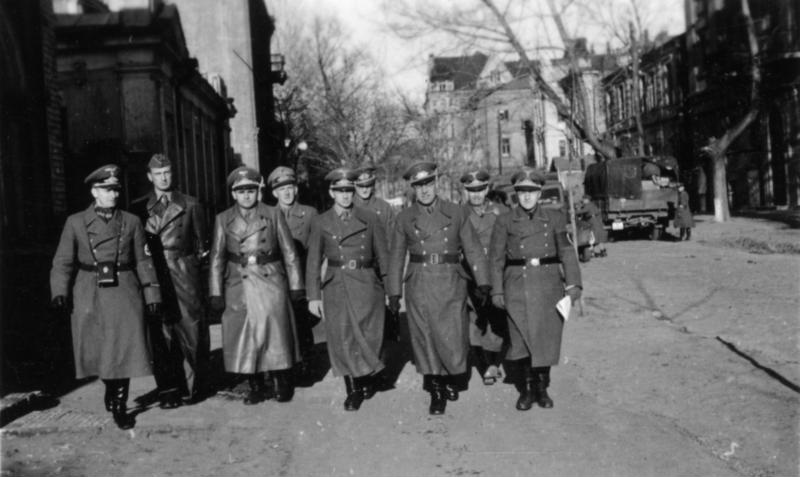
Uniformed officials of ERR in Kharkov.

ERR was a uniformed organization with the hierarchical position of the male officials indicated by rank insignia on collar patches. The patches were bright red for the leadership and the special staff in Berlin; burgundy for other staff and special staff members. On the lower left sleeve was a cuff title with the text "Einsatzstab RR." The actual physical removal of the cultural property was done by local manual workers employed in the occupied countries. They were not uniformed, but wore an armlet with the inscription "Im Dienst der Einsatzstabes RR."

Insignia	Ranks	Translation	Comparative ranks in the Wehrmacht
	Oberst-Einsatzführer	Senior action leader	Oberst
	Oberstabs-Einsatzführer	Senior staff action leader	Oberstleutnant
	Stabs-Einsatzführer	Staff action leader	Major
	Haupt-Einsatzführer	Head action leader	Hauptmann
	Ober-Einsatzführer	Senior action leader	Oberleutnant
	Einsatzführer	Action leader	Leutnant
	Stabs-Einsatzhelfer	Staff action helper	Stabsfeldwebel
	Haupt-Einsatzhelfer	Main action helper	Oberfeldwebel
	Ober-Einsatzhelfer	Senior Action helper	Feldwebel
	Einsatzhelfer	Action helper	Unteroffizier

== See also ==
- Art theft and looting during World War II
- Art repatriation
- Art Looting Investigation Unit
- Karl Haberstock
- Roberts Commission
- Monuments Men Foundation for the Preservation of Art
- Nazi plunder
- M-Aktion
- List of claims for restitution for Nazi-looted art
- Aryanization
