= Hermann Giesler =

German architect (1898–1987)

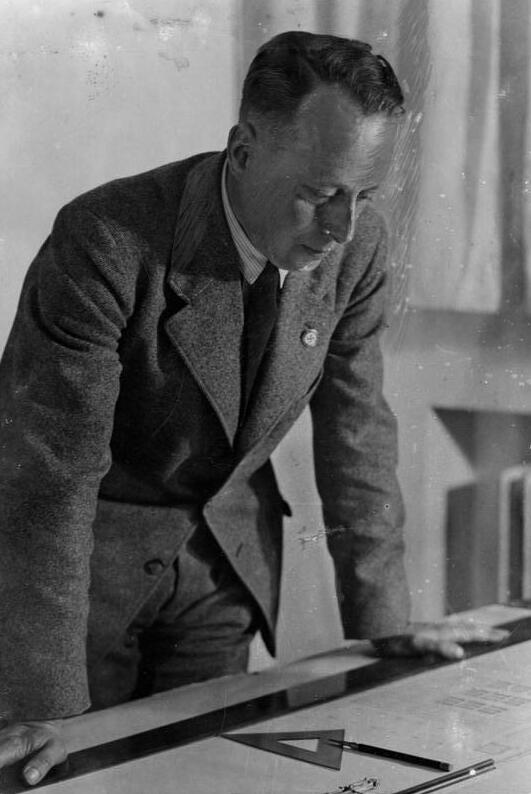
- Giesler in 1938

Personal details
- Born: 2 April 1898 Seigen, Prussia, German Empire
- Died: 20 January 1987 (age 88) Düsseldorf, West Germany
- Party: Nazi Party
- Relatives: Paul Giesler (brother)
- Education: Technical University of Munich
- Profession: Architect

Military service
- Allegiance: German Empire
- Branch/service: Imperial German Army
- Years of service: 1915–1918
- Battles/wars: World War I

Hermann Giesler (2 April 1898 – 20 January 1987) was a German architect during the Nazi era, one of the two architects most favoured and rewarded by Adolf Hitler (the other being Albert Speer).

== Life through World War II ==
Hermann Giesler was born in Siegen and was the younger brother of Paul Giesler who later would become a Gauleiter of the Nazi Party. He served in the First World War from 1915 to 1918 as a soldier in the Imperial German Army. He then worked as a bricklayer, carpenter and metalworker. He studied architecture at the Academy for Applied Arts in Munich (1919 to 1923) and at the Technical University of Munich. Starting from 1930, he worked as an independent architect. In 1933, he became master of building of districts in Sonthofen and, in 1937, became a professor.

On 1 October 1931, Giesler joined the Nazi Party (membership number 622,515). He was an early and enthusiastic Nazi. Up to 1938, he designed the "Ordensburg" in Sonthofen; planned Gau Forums in Weimar and Augsburg; and the "university" for the NSDAP at Chiemsee. In addition, he was commissioned to build Hitler's house in Munich.

In 1938, he restored the Hotel Elephant, a 400-year-old Weimar inn. In December 1938, he was appointed by Hitler "General Building Inspector" for the reorganization of the city of Munich. Later, he also became a director in the Organisation Todt, then one of the directors of the Group of Works of VI (Bavaria, Donaugaue).

Starting in 1941, after fellow architect Roderich Fick fell out of political favour, Giesler was entrusted by Hitler with the reorganization of the entire city of Linz. Beginning from 1942, he worked on plans and a large model for the Danube Development of the Banks. In August 1943, Giesler was appointed as a deputy to the Reichstag for electoral constituency 2 (Berlin-West. Starting from 1944, he also worked on designs for the cultural center, which Hitler regarded with particular interest.

Giesler joined the Organisation Todt (OT) in 1941 as head of the eponymous "Construction Group Giesler" in the Baltic States, as head of the OT-Einsatzgruppe Russia North (1942–1944), and as director of the OT-Einsatzgruppe VI (Bayern und Danube Gaue). He was responsible for the construction management of the Weingut I, an underground armaments production facility, which was built by concentration camp prisoners (1944–1945).

Throughout the war, Giesler and Speer had several heated arguments about architectural styles. In September 1944, Giesler was named one of the Reich's most important artists in the Gottbegnadeten list.

== Post-war life ==
In 1945, Giesler initially was arrested by the U.S. military and interned as a Nazi, and charged in 1946. In 1947, he was indicted by a U.S. military court for war crimes in the concentration camp Mühldorf, a subcamp of Dachau. Giesler was sentenced to life imprisonment, but on 6 May 1948 his sentence was reduced to 25 years imprisonment. On 7 July 1951, it was lowered once again to twelve years. Giesler was freed on 18 October 1952. He settled in Düsseldorf, where he worked in 1953 as an independent architect and author. Giesler never renounced his Nazism. He published autobiographical writings, which appeared both in right-wing publishers (see below), as a commitment to Nazism and Adolf Hitler. Giesler wrote Ein anderer Hitler (Another Hitler), a personal memoir about his relationship with the dictator. He died in 1987.

== Literature ==
- Another Hitler. Report of architect Hermann Giesler. Experiences, discussions, reflections. Druffel Verlag, Leoni on the Starnberger Lake 1978 ISBN 3-8061-0822-6 and ISBN 3-8061-0820-X
- Addendum. From unpublished writings. Hermann Giesler. (Ed. Hermann and Dietrich p. Giesler), Heater & Halifa, Essen 1988 ISBN 3-926650-19-2
- Michael Früchtel: The architect Hermann Giesler. Life and work (1898-1987). Edition of Altavilla, Tübingen 2008, ISBN 978-3-938671-04-7 (studies from the Institute of architectural history, art history, restoration with Museum of architecture, Technical University of Munich, Faculty of architecture), (at the same time: Munich, tech. Univ., Diss., 2007).
- Hartmut Happel: Allgäuer Ordensburg in Sonthofen. Eberl, Immenstadt 1996, ISBN 3-920269-01-2
- Francis Albert Heinen: NS houses Vogelsang, Sonthofen, Krössinsee, ch. links Verlag, Berlin 2011 ISBN 978-3-86153-618-5
- Peter Müller: The bunker site in the Mühldorfer Hart. Obsession with arms and human suffering. Home Federal, Mühldorf am Inn 1999, ISBN 3-930033-17-8.
- Ulrich Friedrich Obed: Siegerland and Wittgenstein in Nazi Germany. People, data, literature. A guide to the regional history. 2. revised edition. History workshop, WINS 2001, ISBN 3-928347-01-2 (Siegen posts.) Special volume 2001).
- Edith RAIM: The Dachau concentration camp outside commands Kaufering and Mühldorf. Fort buildings and forced labor in the last war year of 1944/45 Landsberger Verlagsanstalt, Landsberg am Lech, 1992, ISBN 3-920216-56-3 (at the same time: Munich, Univ., Diss., 1991).
- Roberto Spazzali: Sotto la Todt. Affari, service obbligatorio del lavoro, deportazioni nella zona d ' utilisation "Litorale adriatico". (1943–1945). Libreria Editrice Goriziana, Gorizia, 1998, ISBN 88-86928-28-9 (I leggeri-9), (to work in the southern area of responsibility of the OT group leader Hermann Giesler;) Mühldorf).
- Gerdy Troost: Building during the new Kingdom. Volume 1 Publisher of Gau Bayreuth, Bayreuth, 1938.
- Siegerland national-Zeitung. 29 October, 8 November, 14 December 1938. Central Office in Ludwigsburg, Germany, "Excerpt from the list of war crimes", 51, without signature
- Ernst Klee: The cultural lexicon to the Third Reich. Who was what before and after 1945? S. Fischer, Frankfurt am Main, 2007, p. 183.
