= Institute for Research on the Jewish Question =

Nazi political institution

The Institute for Research on the Jewish Question (Institut zur Erforschung der Judenfrage) was a Nazi Party political institution, founded in April 1939. Conceived as a branch of a projected elite university of the party under the direction of Alfred Rosenberg, it officially opened in Frankfurt am Main in March 1941, during the Second World War, and remained in existence until the end of the war, in 1945.

It should not be confused with the Institute for the Study of the Jewish Question, which was part of Goebbels's propaganda ministry; the latter was later renamed Antisemitische Aktion (Anti-Semitic Action) and then Antijüdische Aktion (Anti-Jewish Action). Also, in occupied France, the Institut d'étude des questions juives (Institute for the Study of Jewish Affairs) was a propaganda institution established in Paris in 1943 by the German military command.

When the institute was founded, the official journal Ziel und Weg (Goal and Way) of the National Socialist German Doctors' League, which was led by Leonardo Conti, welcomed it and demanded: "The Half-Jew has to be treated like the Full-Jew ... so that he is no danger for the protection of the racial value of the European peoples."

The institute cooperated with Walter Frank's Reich Institute for the History of the New Germany, especially with its Research Department for the Jewish Question, which was led by the demographer Friedrich Burgdörfer, who had published the pamphlet "Are the White Nations Dying? The Future of the White and the Colored Nations in the Light of Biological Statistics", which became the origin of the White genocide conspiracy theory.

The institute's journal The World-Struggle: Monthly for Global Politics, Racial Culture and the Jewish Question in all Countries (Der Weltkampf. Monatsschrift für Weltpolitik, völkische Kultur und die Judenfrage aller Länder) was edited by Ernst Graf zu Reventlow; contributors included Gregor Schwartz-Bostunitsch and Johann von Leers.

The effective aim of the institute was information-gathering for propaganda purposes in support of antisemitic policy and, later, the Holocaust. It became the recipient of looted books and other cultural materials from Jewish libraries and institutions in the occupied territories.

The institute's main librarian was Johannes Pohl, a scholar of Hebrew and Jewish studies, former Roman Catholic vicar and alumnus of the Pontifical Biblical Institute.

== See also ==
- Institute for the Study and Elimination of Jewish Influence on German Church Life
- Reich Ministry of Public Enlightenment and Propaganda
