= Anti-Komintern =

Nazi propaganda agency

The Anti-Comintern (German: Antikomintern) was a special agency within the Propaganda Ministry under Joseph Goebbels in Nazi Germany. Founded by Eberhard Taubert in the northern winter or the northern autumn of 1933, it was charged with administering an anti-Soviet propaganda campaign in the mid-1930s. One of its main activities was to publicize that "Bolshevism was Jewish." The agency was headed by Eberhard Taubert and by Adolf Ehrt.

== The Soviet Union in Anti-Comintern publications ==
The books published by Nibelungen Verlag between 1935 and 1941 were all designed to establish a Feindbild (an image of the enemy or bogeyman) of Bolshevism. These tests become interesting when placed in the context of the history of propaganda and German-Russian relations. They provide evidence of the discursive entanglements between National Socialist in Germany and the USSR, demonstrate what one regime wrote about the other, and show how the propaganda methods and narratives of one side influenced the other. The narrative of the travelogue and the setup of the Anti-Komintern as an association clearly point to Soviet examples.

== "Jewish Bolshevism" and "Jewish World Conspiracy" ==
Between the summer of 1939 and the spring of 1941, when the Third Reich and the USSR agreed to an uneasy truce, the anti-Bolshevik propaganda was halted. Joseph Goebbels officially dissolved the Anti-Comintern and concentrated the efforts of his ministry on the British enemy. This had to change with the German aggression against the USSR. After the attack on the Soviet Union on 22 June 1941, Goebbels noted in his diary that it was time to play the "anti-Bolshevik record" once again. The propaganda ministry had to rally the concerned German public for the war against the USSR. It soon became apparent that the wartime propaganda was more than a mere repeat of the anti-Soviet campaign of the late 1930s. As Nazi Germany's propaganda again emphasized a global Jewish conspiracy against the German nation, the anti-Bolshevik rhetoric became a part of a discourse that served to legitimize the World War and the Holocaust.

== After the Second World War ==
After 1945 Eberhard Taubert continued the anti-communist propaganda in the People's League for Peace and Freedom (VFF) in West Germany and was supported financially by the West German government.

Adolf Ehrt, like other members of the former Economic Staff East of the Wehrmacht High Command, worked for the British Secret Intelligence Service on analysing the economic affairs of the Soviet Union. In 1956 this working group was combined with the "Gehlen Organisation", with which Ehrt remained until his retirement.

== Literature ==
- Walter Laqueur: Anti-Komintern, in: Survey – A Journal of Soviet and East European Studies, No. 48, July 1963, pp. 145–162

== See also ==
- Anti-Comintern Pact
- Jewish Bolshevism
