= Samuel Blinder =

Rabbi and retired Army Chaplain

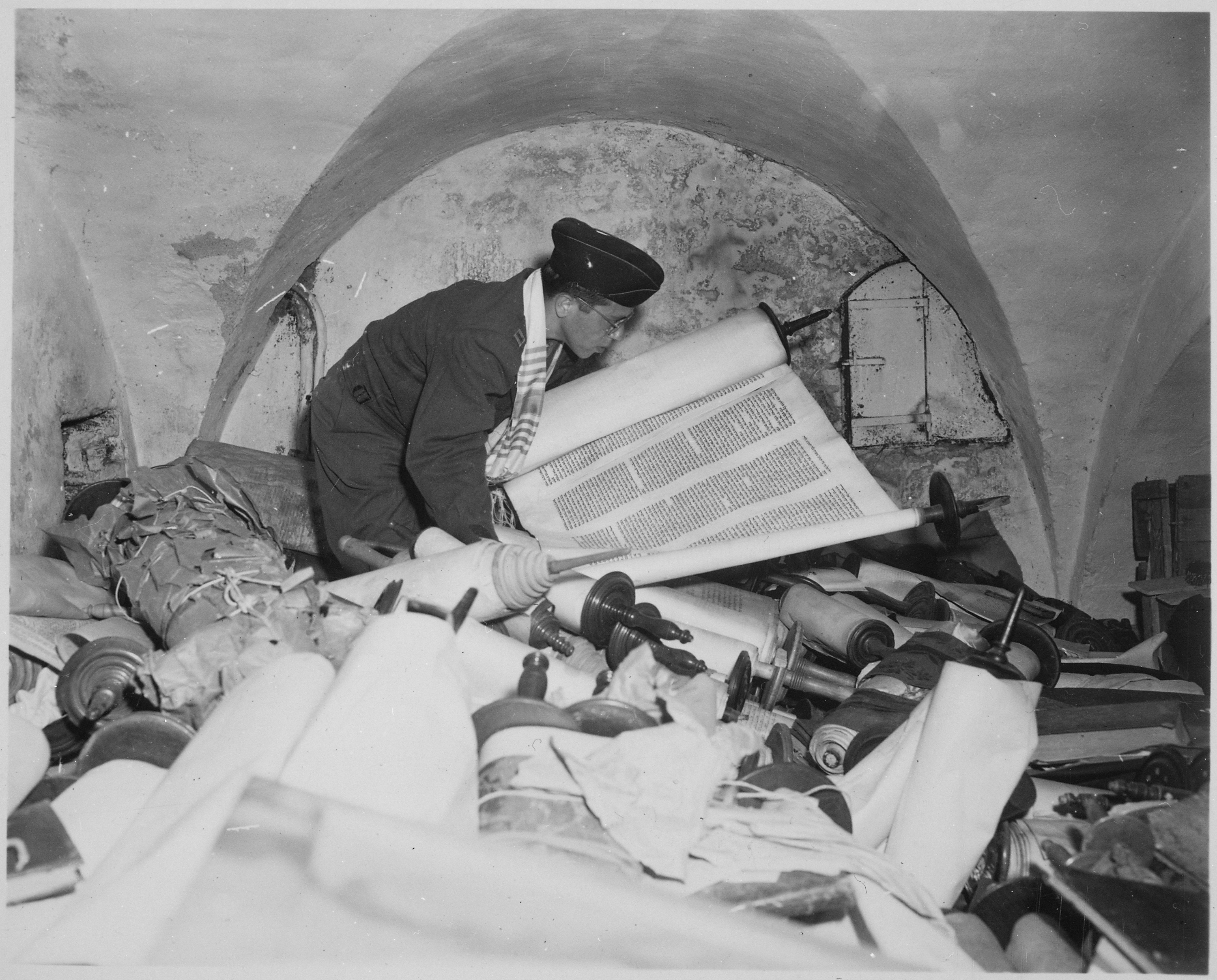
- In the cellar of the Race Institute in Frankfurt, Germany, Chaplain Samuel Blinder examines one of hundreds of... - NARA - 531306
- Born: December 14, 1912; Poland
- Died: 1973
- Education: City College of New York (BA) Harvard Divinity School
- Occupations: Rabbi, Army Chaplain

Samuel Blinder (1912-1973) was a Rabbi and US Army Chaplain who served in France, Holland, and Germany during World War II. He was instrumental in assisting the Jewish community in the immediate aftermath of World War II.

== Biography ==
Blinder was born in Poland in 1912, but moved with his family to Brooklyn, New York in 1921. He received his Bachelors degree in Social Science from the City University of New York, and undertook Rabbinical studies at Yeshiva Issac Elchanan. Rabbi Blinder spent time with congregations in several states through the beginning of the war, until 1943 when he enlisted as a Chaplain in the United States Army. He was promoted to Captain and posted to Europe, first to France, then Holland and Germany.

== Europe ==
Capt. Blinder was posted with a unit in the German state of Hesse, and he was present when US Army captured the city of Bad Nauheim on 29 March 1945. The synagogue had sustained significant damage during Kristallnacht,and was now "...a storage pit of iron, hemp rope, steel rope, and other heavy material. The walls were covered with fecal matter, the windows were broken, the floors damaged and torn up. There were no pews left at all, the Almemor [bima] and pulpit were destroyed.” Designed in the style of New Objectivity by Richard Kaufmann in 1929, it was one of the last synagogues inaugurated before the rise of the Nazis.

Under the supervision of Capt. Blinder "Captain Blinrad", former members of the Nazi party were enlisted to clean the building, and the first public service was held on 27 April 1945. Several Jewish American soldiers participated, including a native of the city Rolf Baum, who like Blinder had immigrated to the United States and enlisted in the army. Of the thousands of Jews expelled from Bad Nauheim, three Jews who had been liberated from the concentration camps, as well as Marcus Wachtel, who had been hidden during the war by a local innkeeper, were in attendance.

Capt. Blinder was captured in a photograph that would come to symbolize the recovery of Judaica looted by the Nazis over the course of the war: Blinder hunched in a cramped cellar, delicately holding one of the hundreds of sacred Sifrei Torahs surrounding him. His tallit is visible over his army uniform, a clear indication of his work in two worlds.

In the cellar of the Institute for Research into the Jewish Question in Frankfurt am Main, Capt. Blinder sifted through hundreds of Torahs, manuscripts, and other sacred texts stolen from Jewish libraries, archives, and private homes by the Einsatzstab Rosenberg. He was also part of the discovery of another large cache of stolen Judaica in Schloss Friedrichstein in Kassel. Rabbi Blinder returned to Bad Nauheim with one of these Sifrei Torahs and rededicated the synagogue on 24 June 1945.

He wrote, “Not only have the Jewish people been devastated, but their institutions as well. Schools, hospitals, libraries, synagogues. Of the latter, very few remain in Germany. Most of them have been burned, razed to the ground, and the few that remained were used by the Nazis for warehouses, shops, or as a dumping place for all kinds of junk. Because of this fact we are particularly happy, to celebrate today the dedication of the restored synagogue in Bad Nauheim. Though none of the Jewish community remain, it will serve as a house of worship for American soldiers of Jewish faith. And if ever a Jewish community returns to life here, then they will have this synagogue for their use.”

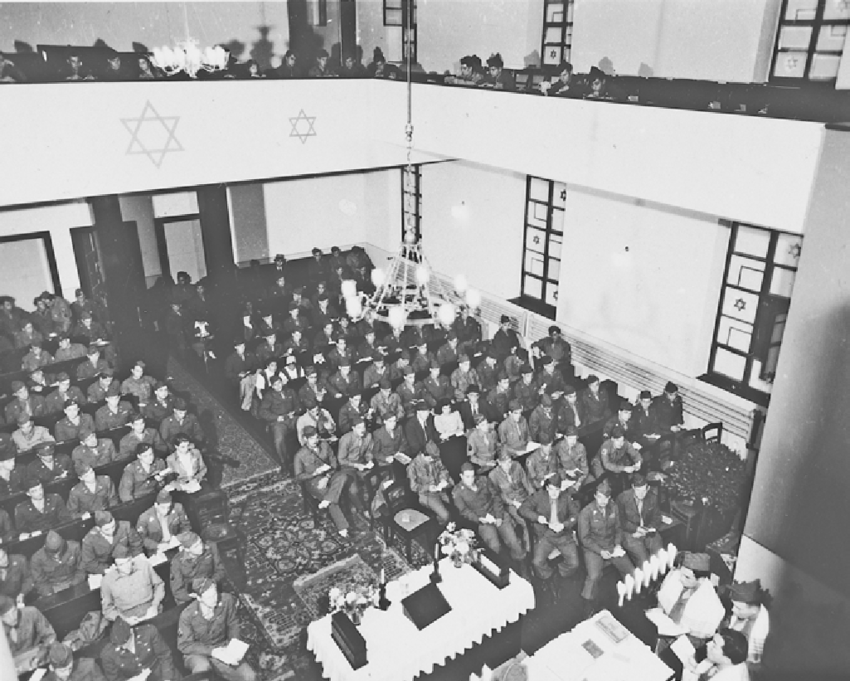
Bad Nauheim Synagogue, Jewish servicemen attend a religious service in the synagogue in Bad Nauheim, 1946 (United States Holocaust Memorial Museum, courtesy of Gisela Eckstein Zamora, call no. 65637)

By 1948, more than 300 Jews who were liberated from the camps and approximately 1,000 Jewish American soldiers lived in Bad Nauheim.

As he traveled with the US Army, Chaplain Blinder assisted in the rebuilding and rededication of synagogues in Angnrod, Korschenbroich, Bad Wildungen, and Mannheim; he provided public services for the survivors of Langenstein, Buchenwald, Bergen-Belsen, Auschwitz, Dachau, Theresienstadt, and others along the way. As he remarked: “The work we Chaplains did in helping the liberated Jews in Concentration Camps. Our physical and spiritual aid boosted their morale and helped them get on their feet to await the arrival of the Jewish Agencies.”

== Later life ==
In April 1946, Chaplain Blinder left the army as a Major. He was awarded three battle stars, a commendation ribbon, and the Bronze Star, most likely from the Corps of Chaplains. After his active duty, he commissioned into the Officer Reserve Corps. He settled in Albany, New York, with his family, where he remained a Rabbi until his death in 1973. While at the Beth Abraham-Jacob Synagogue, for the rest of his life he continued to help reunite families of concentration camp survivors.
