= Eberhard Taubert =

Nazi politician (1907–1976)

Eberhard Taubert (11 May 1907 in Kassel – 2 November 1976) was a lawyer and antisemitic Nazi propagandist. He joined the Nazi Party on 1 November 1931 (membership number 712,249). At the same time, he joined the Sturmabteilung (SA), the Nazi paramilitary unit where he served on the staff of SA-Gruppe Berlin-Brandenburg with the rank of SA-Sturmführer. At the beginning of 1932, Taubert became head of the legal department of Gau Berlin and the anti-Bolshevism advisor to Joseph Goebbels, the Gauleiter. He became involved in both anti-Communist and anti-Jewish propaganda. From 1933 to 1945 he worked as a high official in the Propagandaministerium under Goebbels, where he headed its anti-Komintern department.

== Career ==
His nickname in Nazi circles was Dr. Anti. From 1939 he headed the Institute for the Study of the Jewish Question. He worked in 1940 on the script for the antisemitic propaganda film Der ewige Jude (English: The Eternal Jew). He also served as a lay judge at the People's Court. After the Second World War he changed his name to Erwin Kohl and worked for $3,000 a month for the German Christian Democratic Union in West Germany, providing material against more radical Marxists.

As "Erwin Kohl" Taubert was one of the founders of the People's Union for Peace and Freedom (VFF) in 1950. The VFF saw itself as "the central anti-communist organization in the Federal Republic" and was supported and subsidized by the Federal Ministry for All-German Questions (predecessor of the Federal Ministry for Intra-German Relations). Mathias Friedel regarded the VFF as a replica of the "Anti-Komintern" during the Nazi regime. After his true identity and background was revealed, Eberhard had to retire from the VFF. Taubert was a member of the Naumann Circle, which aimed to infiltrate the Free Democratic Party, and eventually restore Nazism in Germany.

After 1957 he worked in South America, Iran, Lebanon, Egypt and South Africa and as the counsel of the West German minister Franz Josef Strauß. Taubert maintained a liaison office in Bonn, which worked for NATO on matters of psychological defense (PSV).

Taubert was still a counter-intelligence expert for US secret services and in 1959 took on a job for the Iranian secret service (SAVAK) and other Middle Eastern intelligence services. Under the pseudonym Dr. Marcel Wallensdorfer, Taubert was given a press service entitled Anti-Comintern Service.

From 1970 he was employed by German industrialists and largely withdrew from political life due to his illness.

His rhetorical ability made him the talented and wanted propagandist he was, not only during the NS-regime. His agitative style used in the Nazi propaganda was reused after the war to boost the Western fear of communism. For this mission he worked with secret services (for example CIC) and right-wing politicians and journals.

Taubert died in a car crash in Cologne, West Germany in 1976.
