= Tanzenberg Castle =

Coordinates: 46°42′39″N 14°20′37″E

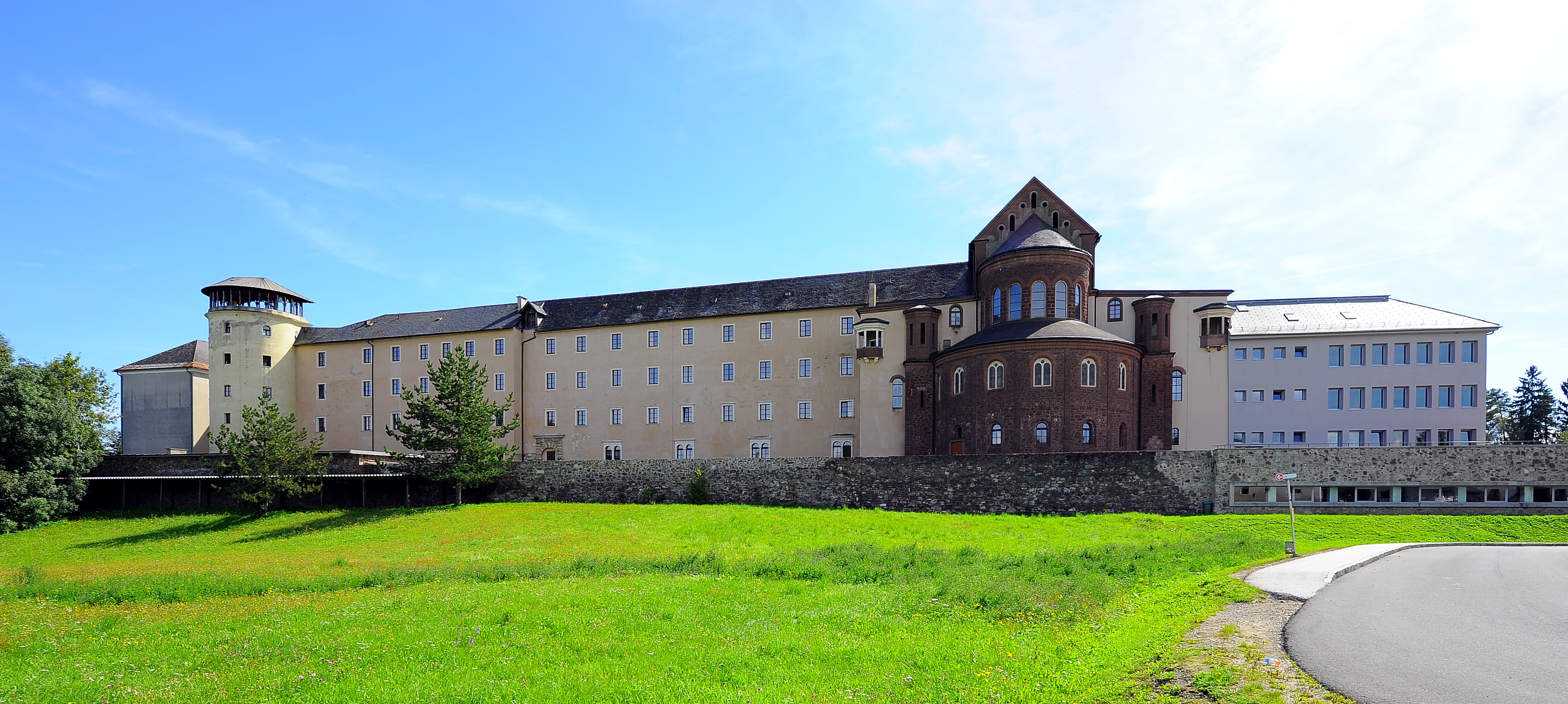
View of the castle from the West

Tanzenberg Castle (German: Schloss Tanzenberg) is a schloss in the town of Sankt Veit an der Glan in Carinthia, Austria.

== History ==
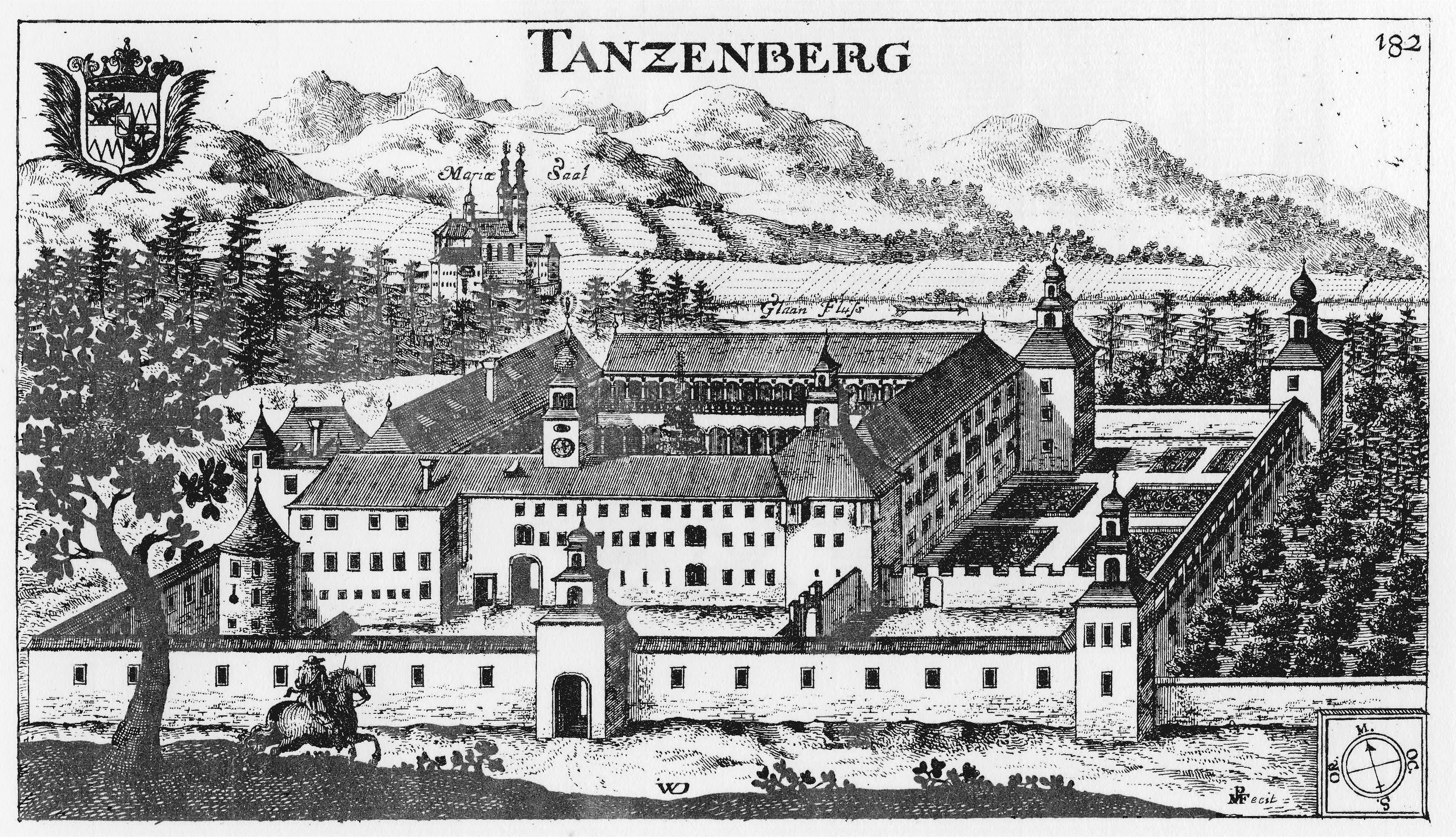
Valvasor's engraving from 1680

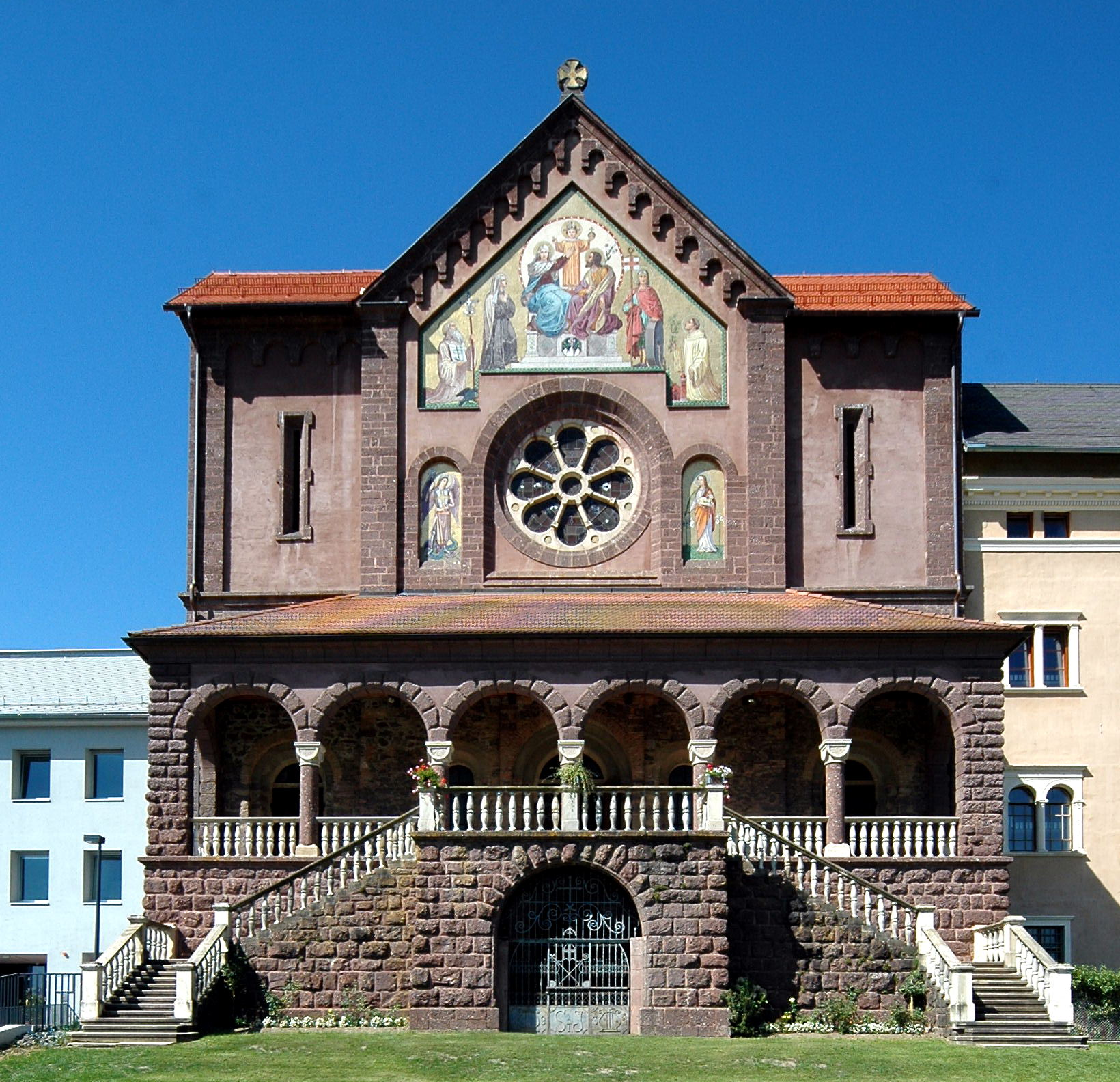
Church entrance

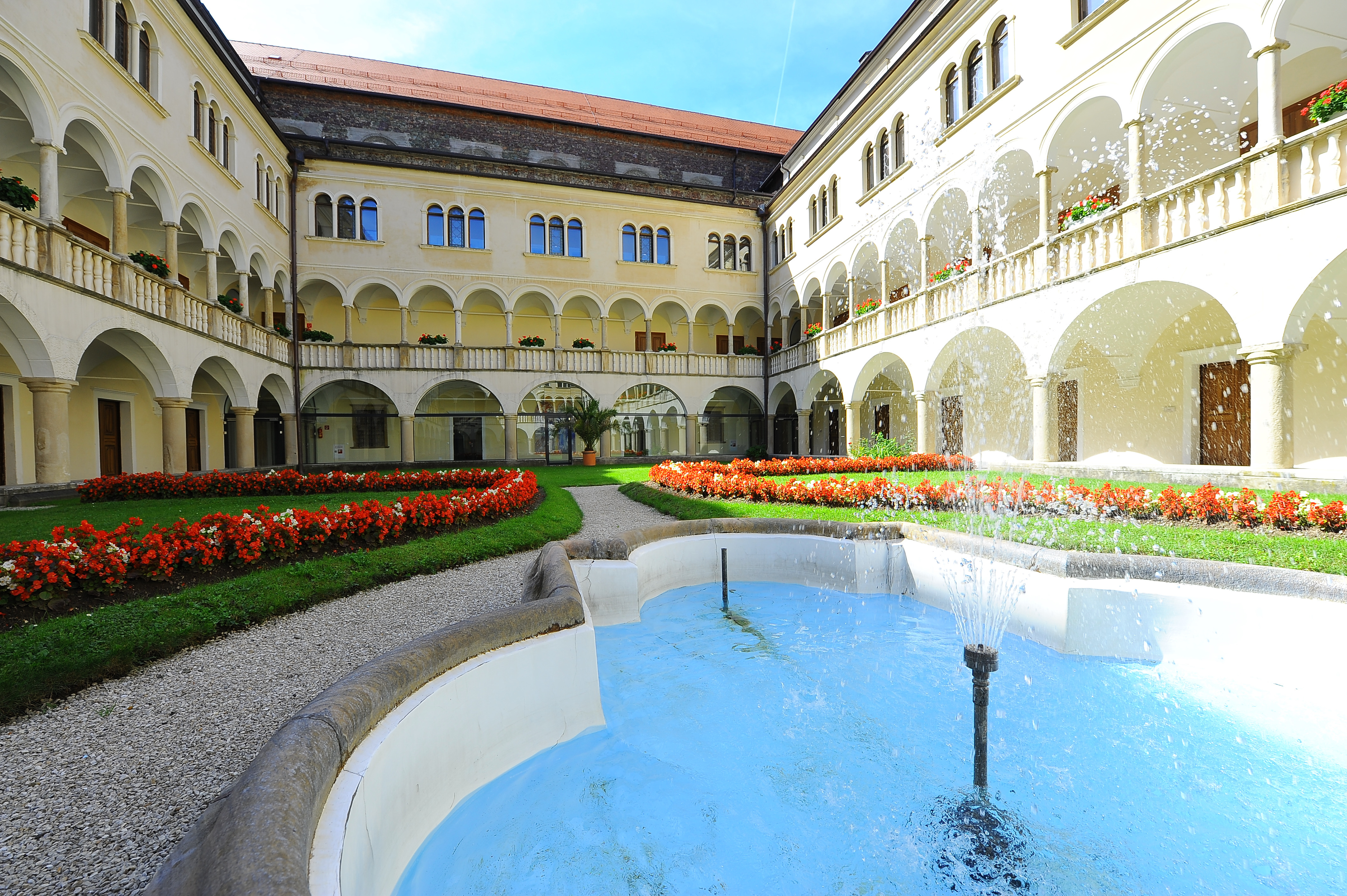
Arcade courtyard in the castle

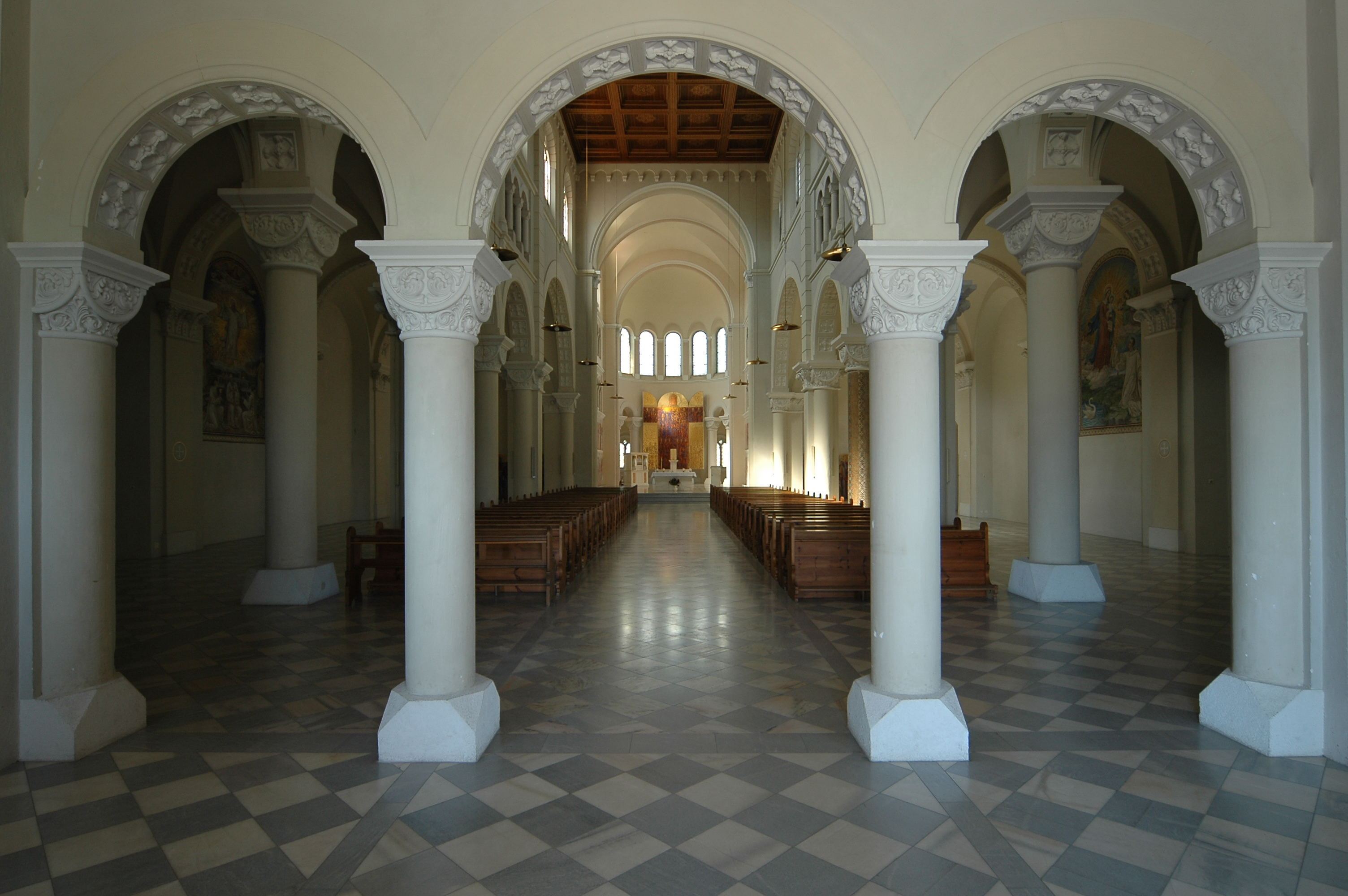
Interior of the castle church

In 1247, there was an individual called Konrad von Tanzenberg who owned the castle. Documents show that the property in 1300 and 1341 was in the possession of the family Mordax (or Mordachs). The castle was acquired in 1513 by Maximilian I, Holy Roman Emperor. The brothers Siegmund and Wolfgang von Keutschach, nephews of the Archbishop of Salzburg Leonhard von Keutschach, began construction of the present-day castle in 1515. The palace, built in four wings around a rectangular courtyard, is one of Austria's most important Renaissance buildings.

Presumably, under the supervision of Leonhard II, the son of Wolfgang von Keutschach, the castle was completed. The property remained in the possession of von Keutschach until the second half of the 17th century.

The building fell into disrepair in the 19th century. In 1891, Georg von Gutmannsthal acquired the castle. In 1898, the Olivetans acquired the castle and began its renovation into a monastery building. The two lower floors are from the original sixteenth-century structure. In the northeast section, there are preserved components of the medieval castle. Replacing the former banqueting hall on the southwestern side, a monastery church was built in 1898.

From 1942 until the end of the war in 1945, Tanzenberg Castle served as a repository for the collections of the Central Library of the Advanced School of the NSDAP. In 1946, it became a Catholic boys' boarding school for seminary candidates. In 1953, the castle became the property of the Roman Catholic Diocese of Gurk. In 1995/1996, the facades were restored.

== Architecture ==
The mighty three-story palace complex can be seen dominating over the Zollfeld. Four tracts around a rectangular courtyard form a Renaissance structure that is significant in Austria, although the state of disrepair in the 19th century and the subsequent renovations of 1898 caused much to longer exist. The original structures of the 16th century largely correspond to the two lower floors.

== Seminar Church (Klosterkirche) ==
The Neo-Romanesque, three-nave basilica with an apse was built in the first two decades of the twentieth century according to plans by Hans Pascher in collaboration with the architect Father Johann Maria Reiter and Eduard Avian, but it was not completed. The final construction was carried out from 1980 to 1987.

On the façade, there are three mosaic paintings by Josef Pfefferle made between 1924 and 1927. The largest shows the Holy Family with the four saints Benedict of Nursia, Franziska, Saint Florian and Bernhard. The two smaller mosaics depict the Archangel Michael and Holy Agnes. The two mosaics "St. Benedict receive the Rule of the Order" and "Glory of St. Benedict " are in the aisles of the church.

Between 1986 and 1987, the artist Valentin Oman designed casein tempera colors and later removed the side walls of the sanctuary and the two side apses. The side walls show stages of human life. The winged altarpiece, also from his own hand, stands under the theme of "security in the new life" and reproduces the head of the Shroud of Turin on the upper side.

== Middle/High school ==
Today, the castle belongs to the Roman Catholic Diocese of Gurk. The buildings are used as a humanistic and linguistic high school: the Bundesgymnasium and Marianum Tanzenberg.

In the 2018-19 school year, there are 15 lower grades and 8 upper grades in Tanzenberg.

=== Notable alumni ===
- Peter Handke
- Gustav Januš
- Florjan Lipuš
- Engelbert Obernosterer
- Valentin Oman
- Karl Smolle
- Alfred Goubran

== Literature ==
- Die Kunstdenkmäler Österreichs. Dehio Kärnten 2001. Tanzenberg, Schloss, S. 941–942.
- Christian Cvetko: Tanzenberg. Rennaissanceschloss – Olivetanerabtei – Gymnasium (= Archiv für vaterländische Geschichte und Topographie. 105). Verlag des Geschichtsvereines für Kärnten, Klagenfurt am Wörthersee 2014, ISBN 978-3-85454-127-1.
