= Advanced School of the NSDAP =

Proposed elite Nazi university

The Advanced School of the NSDAP (German: Hohe Schule der NSDAP, literally "High School of the NSDAP") was a project by the chief ideologist of the Nazi Party Alfred Rosenberg to create an elite Nazi university, a kind of academy for party officials. A monumental central university building was to be built on the shores of Lake Chiemsee, based on the architectural plans of Hermann Giesler.

== History ==
The university's establishment began in 1939 with the opening of its central library. Alfred Baumler nominated philologist Walter Grothe as the library's head. On 29 January 1940, Rosenberg received an order from Hitler to continue the preparatory work for the university's opening:

The Hohe Schule is some day to become the center for National Socialist doctrinal research and education. It will be established after the war. However, in order to expedite the preparatory work already initiated, I order that Reichsleiter Alfred Rosenberg continue this preparatory work, especially in the field of research and the establishment of a library. The offices of the Party and the State organizations are required to support his work in every way.

— Adolf Hitler, 29 January 1940

The first faculty of the school, the Institute for Study of the Jewish Question, was opened on 26 March 1941 in Frankfurt am Main. Rosenberg's plan was to establish at least a total of eleven units of the school in different locations. Among these were Institute for Indo-Germanic Intellectual History (Munich), Institute of Biology and Race Studies (Stuttgart), Institute of Religious Studies (Halle), Institute of Germanic Studies (Kiel), Institute of Ideological Colonial Studies (Hamburg), Institute of German Folklore (Münster and Graz), Institute for Research on the East (Prague), Institute of Celtic Studies (Römhild) and Institute for the Study of Germanism and Gallicanism (Strasbourg).

In October 1942, the Central Library of the High School moved from Berlin to Carinthia, where parts of the library were housed in the Tanzenberg Castle in Sankt Veit an der Glan, a former Olivetan monastery.

To achieve the goal set out by Hitler on 29 January 1940, the Reichsleiter Rosenberg Taskforce with the help of the Gestapo combed through the libraries, archives, Masonic lodges and the offices of high church authorities of occupied Western Europe in search of relevant material for the university. On 1 March 1942, Hitler authorized Rosenberg to seize materials as well as cultural treasures for the school, as a "systematic spiritual battle" against "Jews, Freemasons, and affiliated opponents of National Socialism" was necessary. More than 500,000 volumes were seized and sent to the Central Library to wait for the war's end and a transfer to Chiemsee.

== See also ==
- Adolf Hitler School – Schools run by the SS from 1937 to 1945
- Kaiser Wilhelm Society – German scientific institution
- National Political Institutes of Education – Elite secondary schools in Nazi Germany
- NS-Ordensburg – Training centers for Nazi military
- SS-Junker Schools – Nazi SS leadership training facilities

== Bibliography ==
- Haupt, Heinrich (2025). Die Hohe Schule. Ein Campus nationalsozialistischer Wissenschaft für Forschung, Lehre und Erziehung (in German). Books on Demand. ISBN 9783759794048.
