= Shatilov =

Shatilov (Russian: Шатилов) is a Russian masculine surname, its feminine counterpart is Shatilova. It may refer to

- Alexander Shatilov (born 1987), Israeli artistic gymnast
- Anna Shatilova (born 1938), Russian TV announcer and presenter
- Vasily Shatilov (1902–1995), Soviet general
