= Institute for the Study of the Jewish Question =

Nazi propaganda institute (1934–42) on anti-Jewish research

The Institute for the Study of the Jewish Question (German: Institut zum Studium der Judenfrage) was founded in 1934 and was affiliated with the Reich Ministry of Propaganda under Joseph Goebbels. In 1939 the institution was called "Anti-Semitic Action" (Antisemitische Aktion) and from 1942 "Anti-Jewish Action" (Antijüdische Aktion).

The institute was founded in 1934 by Eberhard Taubert on behalf of the Reich Propaganda Ministry. Originally, the institute was to be a joint research center against Judaism, Freemasonry and liberalism, but the tasks were separated. From the beginning, the Propaganda Ministry tried to camouflage the institute's affiliation with the government over fear of negative foreign policy consequences.

== See also ==
- Institute for the Study and Elimination of Jewish Influence on German Church Life
- Institute for Research on the Jewish Question
- German Christians (movement)
- Eberhard Taubert
- Reich Ministry of Public Enlightenment and Propaganda
