= Gregor Schwartz-Bostunitsch =

Nazi propagandist

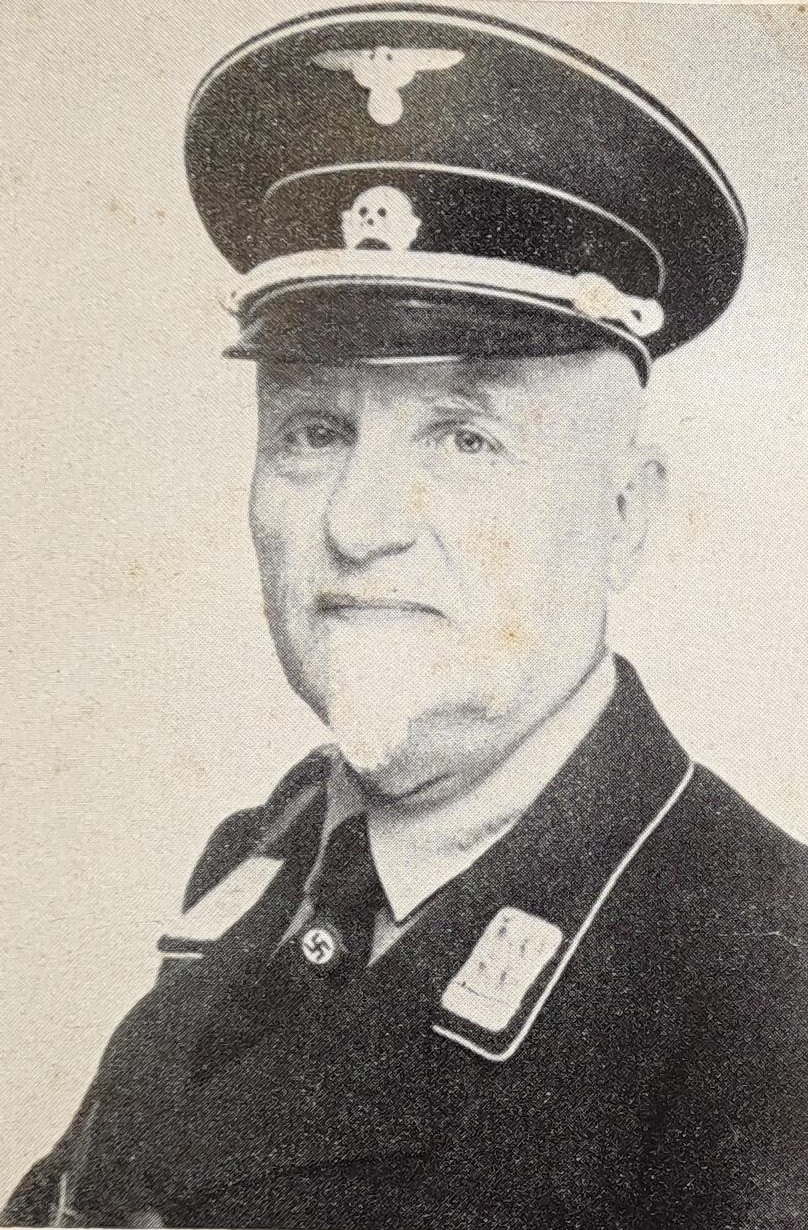
- Schwartz-Bostunitsch in 1940

SS-Standartenführer

Personal details
- Born: 01.12.1883 -Kyiv, Ukraine, Russian Empire
- Died: Unknown Unknown
- Party: National Socialist German Workers Party (NSDAP)

Gregor Schwartz-Bostunitsch (born 1 December 1883, d. after 1945) was a prominent figure in Nazi Germany. He was a German-Russian author in the völkisch movement and became SS-Standartenführer in 1944.

== Life ==
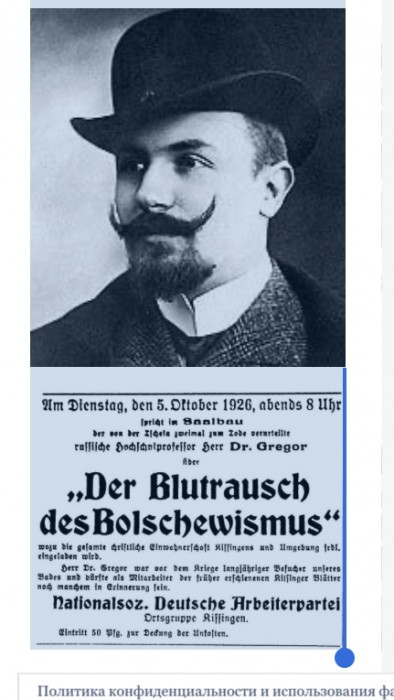
Gregor Schwartz-Bostunitsch in 1926

Gregor Schwartz-Bostunitsch was a radical author with German-Russian ancestry. An active agitator against the Bolshevik Revolution, he fled his native Russia in 1920 and travelled widely in eastern Europe, making contact with Bulgarian Theosophists and probably with G.I. Gurdjieff. As a mystical anti-communist, he developed an unshakeable belief in the Jewish-Masonic-Bolshevik world conspiracy portrayed in the Protocols of the Elders of Zion. In 1922 he published his first book, Freemasonry and the Russian Revolution, and emigrated to Germany in the same year. He became an enthusiastic convert to Anthroposophy in 1923, but by 1929 he had repudiated it as yet another agent of the conspiracy. Meanwhile, he had begun to give lectures for the Ariosophical Society and was a contributor to Georg Lomer's originally Theosophical (and later, neopagan) periodical entitled Asgard: a fighting sheet for the gods of the homeland. He also worked for Alfred Rosenberg's news agency during the 1920s before joining the SS. He lectured widely on conspiracy theories and was appointed an honorary SS professor in 1942, but was barred from lecturing in uniform because of his unorthodox views. In 1944 he was promoted to SS-Standartenführer on Himmler's recommendation.

At the beginning of 1945, Bostunić was still alive, and in mid-March he was in Bad Harzburg. The last mention of him dates back to May 1946, when he was included in the list of war criminals by the General Staff of the American occupation forces but his eventual fate is unknown.

== Works ==
- Ein Meer von Blut (Sea of Blood). Munich 1926.
- Die Freimaurerei (Freemasonry). Weimar 1928.
- Die Bolschewisierung der Welt (Bolshevisation of the World). Munich 1929.
- Doktor Steiner, ein Schwindler wie keiner ein Kapitel über Anthropologie und die geistige Verwirrungsarbeit der Falschen Propheten (Dr Steiner, a Conman: A chapter about anthropology and the mental disorientation agitation of the false prophets). Munich 1930.
- Jüdischer Imperialismus – 3000 Jahre hebräischer Schleichwege zur Erlangung der Weltherrschaft (Jewish Imperialism – 3000 years of Hebrew secret paths to world supremacy). Landsberg am Lech 1935.
- Jude und Weib Theorie und die Praxis des jüdischen Vampyrismus, der Ausbeutung und Verseuchung der Wirtsvölker (Jew and Woman, Theoretical and practical few on Jewish vampyrism, the exploitation and contamination of the host nations). Berlin 1939.
