= Seigen =

- Gender: Male

Origin
- Origin: Japanese
- Meaning: Different meanings depending on the kanji used

Seigen (written: 清源 or 勢源) is a masculine Japanese given name. Notable people with the name include:

- Go Seigen (呉 清源) (born 1914), Chinese Go player
- Toda Seigen (富田 勢源), Japanese swordsman
