= Fedor von Bock =

German Army field marshal (1880–1945)

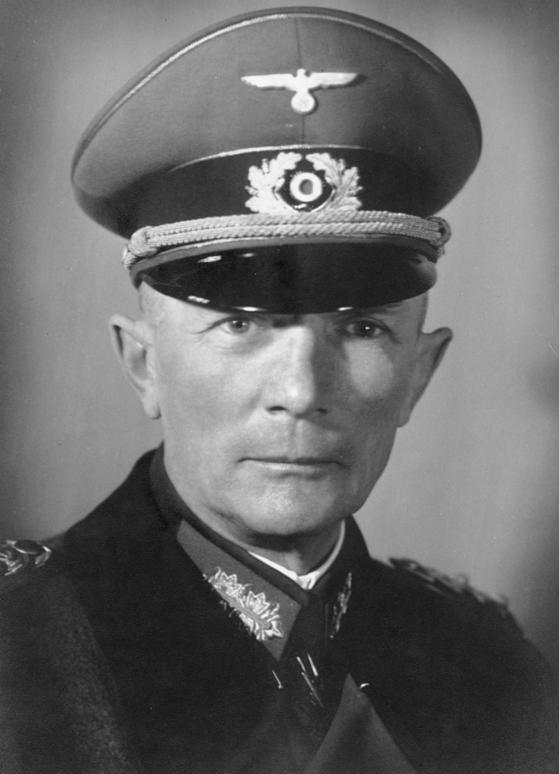
- Bock in 1939
- Born: Moritz Albrecht Franz Friedrich Fedor von Bock; 3 December 1880; Cüstrin, Kingdom of Prussia, Germany
- Died: 4 May 1945 (aged 64); Oldenburg in Holstein, Germany
- Burial place: Friedhof Lensahn
- Spouses: Mally Lonny Anna Marga Klara von Reichenbach (m. 1905; died 1910); Wilhelmine Gottliebe Jenny von Boddien (m. 1936; died 1945)
- Children: 1
- Relatives: Erich von Falkenhayn (uncle); Eugen von Falkenhayn (uncle)
- Military career
- Allegiance: Prussia; Germany
- Branch: Imperial German Army; Prussian Army; Reichswehr; German Army
- Service years: 1898–1942
- Rank: Generalfeldmarschall
- Nicknames: Holy Fire of Küstrin; Der Sterber
- Commands: Reichswehr: II. (light) Battalion, 4th Prussian Infantry Regiment; 4th Prussian Infantry Regiment; 1st Cavalry Division; Military District II Wehrmacht: Gruppenkommando 3 Gruppenkommando 1 Army Group North; Army Group B Army Group Center; Army Group South
- Conflicts: See battles World War I: Western front; German spring offensive; Eastern Front; Gorlice–Tarnów Offensive; Brusilov Offensive; World War II: Invasion of Poland; Battle of Gdynia; Western Front; Battle of the Netherlands; Battle of Maastricht; Battle of Belgium; Battle of the Lys (1940); Battle of France; Battle of Dunkirk; Eastern Front; Operation Barbarossa; Battle of Białystok-Minsk; Battle of Smolensk (1941); Yelnya Offensive; Battle of Moscow; Battles of Rzhev; Operation Blue
- Awards: Pour le Mérite; Knight's Cross of the Iron Cross

Moritz Albrecht Franz Friedrich Fedor von Bock (3 December 1880 – 4 May 1945) was a German Generalfeldmarschall (Field Marshal) who served in the German Army during the Second World War. Bock served as the commander of Army Group North during the Invasion of Poland in 1939, of Army Group B during the Invasion of France in 1940, of Army Group Center during Operation Barbarossa in 1941, and of Army Group South on the Eastern Front in 1942.

Bock was a staff officer of the Imperial German Army during World War I and rose through the ranks of the post-war Reichswehr during the Weimar Republic. Bock was given his first command post in 1935, playing a key role in the Anschluss, the annexation of the Sudetenland, the invasion of Poland, and the invasion of France for which he was promoted to Generalfeldmarschall. Bock was successful during Operation Barbarossa and commanded Operation Typhoon, the German attempt to capture Moscow during the autumn and winter of 1941, which was slowed by the rasputitsa and stiff Soviet resistance around Mozhaisk.

Bock was a monarchist neutral to the Nazi regime and not heavily involved in politics, but he did not sympathize with plots to overthrow Hitler. Bock was outspoken in his disagreement with Hitler and the Army High Command's strategy on the Eastern Front, a privilege extended to him only because he had been successful in battle. After the failure of Operation Typhoon and the German retreat from the Red Army, Bock was relieved of his command by Hitler in July 1942 forcing him into retirement for the rest of the war. Bock was killed by a strafing Royal New Zealand Air Force plane on 4 May 1945 while travelling by car towards Hamburg.

== Early life ==
Fedor von Bock was born on 3 December 1880 in Cüstrin, Province of Brandenburg (now Kostrzyn, Poland), into an old Prussian military family. His father, Moritz Albert Karl von Bock, had commanded a division of the Prussian Army in the Franco-Prussian War of 1870–1871 and was ennobled by Kaiser Wilhelm I for his achievements during the conflict. His mother, Olga Helene Franziska von Falkenhayn, was the sister of Erich von Falkenhayn, the Chief of the German General Staff during the First World War, and had relatives within the Russian aristocracy.

At the age of eight, Bock went to study at a military academy in Berlin, receiving an education that emphasized Prussian militarism. He quickly became adept in academic subjects such as modern languages, mathematics, and history. He spoke fluent French, and some English and Russian. At an early age, and largely due to his father, Bock developed an unquestioning loyalty to the German state and dedication to the military profession. While not a brilliant theoretician, Bock was a highly motivated officer. As one of the highest-ranking officers in the Reichswehr, he often addressed graduating cadets at his alma mater, which closed in 1920. His theme was always that the greatest glory that could come to a German soldier was to die for the Fatherland. He quickly earned the nickname "Holy Fire of Küstrin". In 1905, Bock married Mally von Reichenbach (1887–1910), a young Prussian noblewoman. They had a daughter. In 1908, Bock entered the Prussian Staff College in Berlin, and after a year's study he joined the ranks of the General Staff. He soon joined the Army League (Deutscher Wehrverein) and came to know Walther von Brauchitsch, Franz Halder, and Gerd von Rundstedt.

== World War I ==
By the time World War I began in 1914, Bock had reached the rank of Hauptmann and a staff officer of the Guards Corps, which was deployed to the Western Front. In May 1915, he was transferred to the 11th Army on the Eastern Front and participated in the Gorlice–Tarnów offensive. The following year he joined the General Staff of the 200th Infantry Division, taking part in the mountain warfare in the Carpathians and in the defense of the Brusilov Offensive. In April 1917, he was transferred to the General Staff of the German Crown Prince's Army Group on the Western Front. On 1 April 1918, he was decorated with Pour le Mérite for his work on the General Staff during the Spring Offensive. He had previously received both classes of the Iron Cross and the Knight's Cross of the Royal House Order of Hohenzollern with Swords.

== Weimar Republic ==
Bock stayed on as an officer of the Reichswehr after the war and rose through the ranks. In the early 1920s, General Hans von Seeckt, chief of the Army Command, named Bock head of a group tasked with building up what came to be known as the Black Reichswehr. It consisted of "labour battalions" (Arbeitskommandos), purportedly made up of civilian volunteers attached to Reichswehr units, but its members wore Reichswehr uniforms and received their training and orders from it. Its actual purpose was to provide a way for the Reichswehr to circumvent the restriction in the Treaty of Versailles which limited Germany's army to 100,000 men. Bock chose Major Bruno Ernst Buchrucker to build up the force. The Black Reichswehr under Buchrucker became infamous for the Feme murders to punish "traitors" who, for example, revealed the locations of weapons' stockpiles or names of members. During the trials of some of those charged with the murders, prosecutors alleged that the killings were ordered by the officers from Bock's group. The journalist Carl von Ossietzky wrote: "... [the accused] did nothing but carry out the orders given him, and that certainly Colonel von Bock, and probably ... General Seeckt, should be sitting in the dock beside him." Several times Bock denied in court that the Reichswehr ministry had had any knowledge the "Black Reichswehr" or the murders they had committed.

On 27 September 1923, Buchrucker ordered 4,500 men of the Black Reichswehr to assemble outside of Berlin as the first preparatory step toward a coup d'état. Bock, who was Buchrucker's contact with the Reichswehr, was enraged, and in a stormy meeting berated Buchrucker for mobilizing without orders. Bock stated that the Reichswehr wanted no part in Buchrucker's coup and, despite his orders to demobilize at once, Buchrucker went ahead with the Küstrin Putsch on 1 October 1923, which ended in total failure. Following the coup attempt, Seeckt disbanded the Black Reichswehr.

After the Nazis came to power in 1933, Bock was neutral towards the new regime and remained a monarchist. In 1935, Adolf Hitler promoted Bock to General der Infanterie and appointed him as commander of the Third Army Group, and he was one of the officers who was not removed from his position when Hitler reorganized the armed forces during the German rearmament. Hitler reportedly said of him, "Nobody in the world but Bock can teach soldiers to die." In 1936 Bock married Wilhelmine, née von Boddien (1893–1945). Bock marched into Vienna at the head of the 8th Army in March 1938 during the Anschluss, and played a key role in the annexation of the Sudetenland, also in 1938.

== World War II ==
=== Invasion of Poland ===
By 25 August 1939, Bock was in command of Army Group North in preparation for the imminent invasion of Poland. The objective of Army Group North was to destroy the Polish forces north of the Vistula with a force composed of General Georg von Küchler's 3rd Army, and General Günther von Kluge's 4th Army. These struck southward from East Prussia and eastward across the base of the Polish Corridor, respectively.

On 10 September, Bock ordered the forces under his command to burn Polish villages located behind the front line to the ground if they were fired upon from the settlement and "if it proves impossible to identify the house from which the shots came". By the end of the military occupation of Poland on 26 October 1939, 531 towns and villages had been destroyed across the country. In five weeks, Poland was overrun by Germans and then Soviet forces after their occupation of Poland from the east.

=== Invasion of France ===
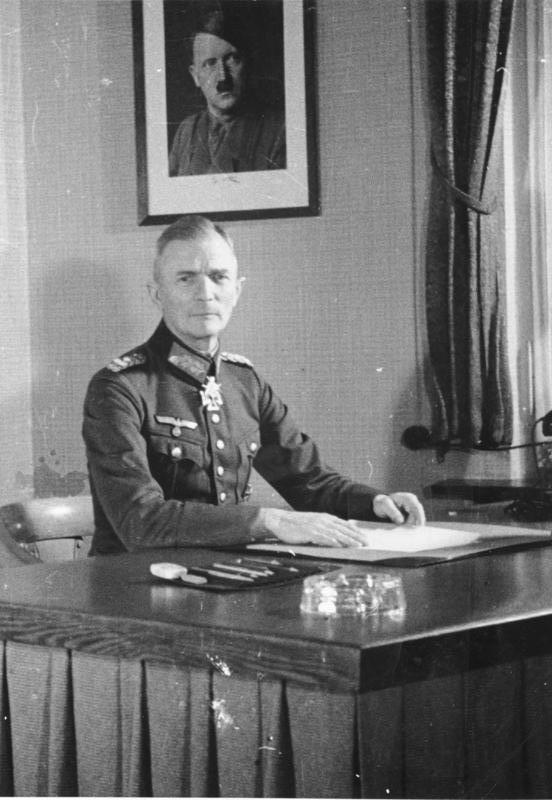
Bock in April 1940

On 12 October 1939, shortly after the conquest of Poland, Bock was given command of Army Group B, with 29½ divisions, including three armoured divisions. These were tasked with advancing through the Low Countries and luring the northern units of the Allied armies into a pocket. Army Group B consisted of the 18th and 6th Armies. While his units were overrunning the Netherlands, in May 1940, Bock attempted to call on the exiled former Kaiser Wilhelm II at his home in Doorn, but was unable to gain admittance, as the German troops guarding the residence having been instructed to prevent such visits.

Bock participated in the Armistice with France in late June 1940.

On 19 July 1940, Bock was promoted to the rank of field marshal during the 1940 Field Marshal Ceremony. At the end of August, the Army High Command transferred Army Group B to East Prussia; this included Kluge's 4th Army. On 11 September, Bock relinquished command of his occupation area in France to Field Marshal Wilhelm Ritter von Leeb.

=== Operation Barbarossa ===
On 2 February 1941, Bock met with Hitler and questioned whether the Soviets could be forced to make peace even if the Red Army was brought to battle and defeated. Hitler airily assured Bock that Germany's resources were more than sufficient and that he was determined to fight. On 1 April 1941, in preparation for the invasion of the Soviet Union, Army Group B was re-designated as Army Group Center. Deployed in Poland, it was one of the three army formations which were to lead the invasion. It included the 4th and 9th Armies, the 3rd and 2nd Panzer Armies, and Luftflotte 2 of the Luftwaffe. On the left flank of Bock's Army Group Center was Army Group North, commanded by Wilhelm Ritter von Leeb; on the right flank was Army Group South, commanded by Gerd von Rundstedt. The main objective of Army Group Center was to follow the route north of the Pripyat Marshes to the Soviet capital Moscow. Following the border battles, the task of Army Group Center was to drive towards the cities of Minsk and Smolensk, and destroy the Soviet armies stationed there in encirclement battles.

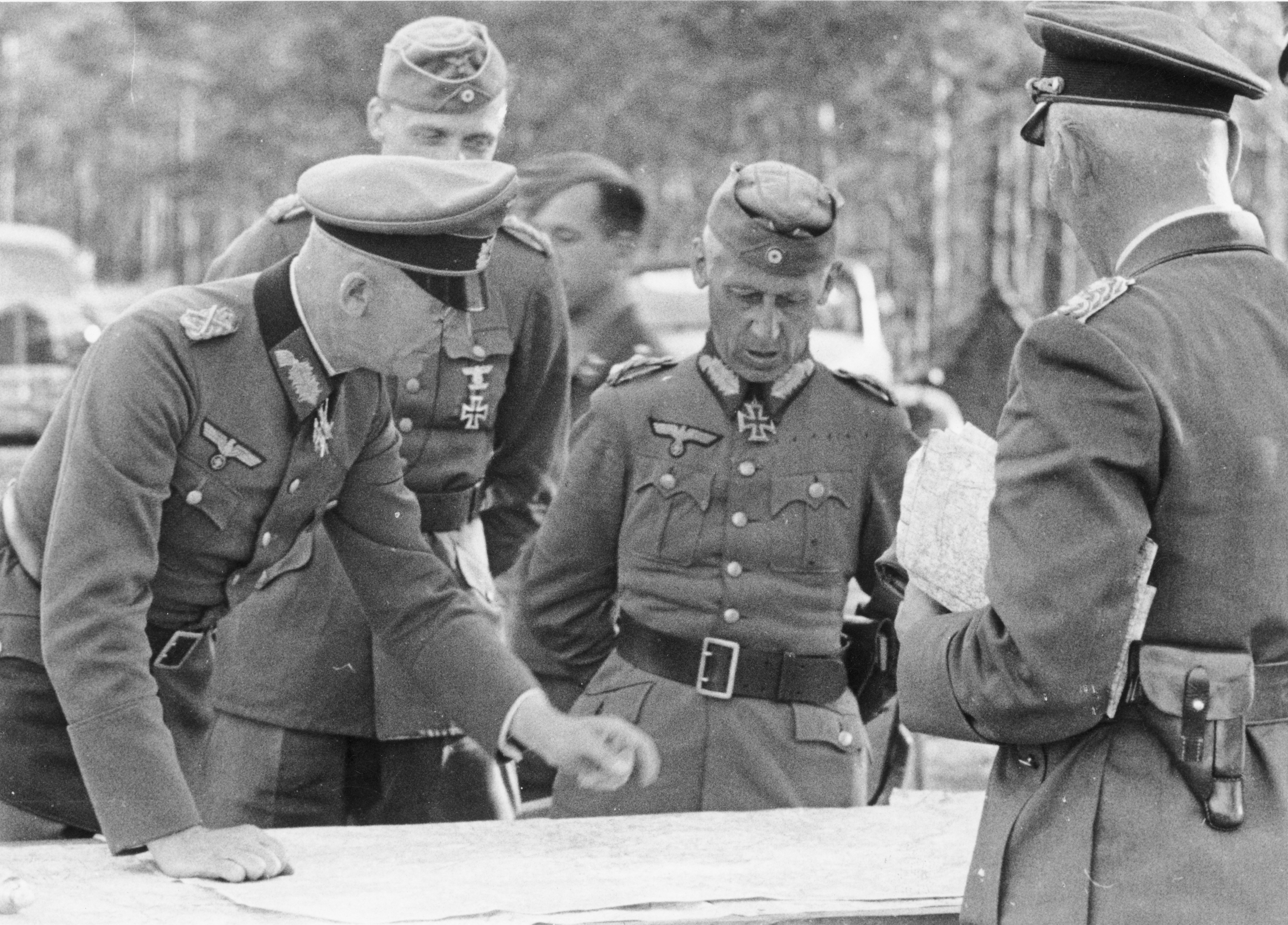
Hermann Hoth with Bock (left) in Russia during Operation Barbarossa, 1941.

At 03:15 on 22 June 1941, a Sunday, the first shots of Operation Barbarossa were fired; Germany invaded the Soviet Union with a timed declaration of war. Elements of Heinz Guderian's force had crossed the Bug River and were bypassing the city of Brest-Litovsk. Hermann Hoth's tanks were heading for Grodno on the Nieman River to seize the important river crossings. Several reconnaissance units from the 4th and 9th Armies had already crossed the Bug and Desna rivers. At 07:00, Bock flew from Posen to an advance airfield near the headquarters of XIII Infantry Corps. There, Major General Erich Jaschke gave Bock a summary of the progress of the invasion. Following this meeting, Bock visited Guderian's forward command post at Bokhaly. Bock then visited Joachim Lemelsen, who gave a report from the front. The roads on the Soviet side of the Bug River were already becoming too soft to support the weight of tanks. Despite this, the first day of the invasion had been spectacularly successful. Soviet resistance was reported as being light and complete surprise was achieved. All along the front rapid progress was being made.

On the second day of Barbarossa, Bock crossed the Bug River escorted by Major General Gustav Schmidt. Later that day Bock was presented with reports that Soviet resistance was stiffening all along the front, especially on Guderian's southern flank. Meanwhile, Hoth's forces were advancing with much more ease through the Baltic states and Belarus. The first two days of Army Group Center's advance proved to be highly successful. Hoth's army advanced so quickly that Bock immediately contacted Walter von Brauchitsch, requesting the bypassing of Minsk in favour of attacking toward Vitebsk so that a drive could be made for Moscow. Initially, the change in plan was accepted but it was soon overruled by Hitler, who favoured the encirclement and destruction of the large Soviet armies near Minsk. Bock wrote in his diary:

The envelopment of Minsk is not decisive. Besides, I am sure that the enemy expects us to attack Minsk, the next natural objective, and will concentrate defence forces there.

Differences between the strategic intent of Bock and Brauchitsch's Army High Command repeatedly surfaced. Bock continued to favour a direct drive toward Moscow, bypassing Soviet armies and leaving them to be destroyed by infantry, which advanced on foot well behind tank columns. Bock argued that if encirclement were truly necessary then instead of diverting his tanks north and south to encircle and destroy smaller Soviet armies, a larger encirclement should be made eastward toward the Dvina-Dnieper river basins. Hitler decided against this plan, and insisted that the pockets containing Soviet armies must be destroyed before advancing deeper into Russia. Bock, enraged by this decision, was quoted as saying: "We are permitting our greatest chance of success to escape us by this restriction placed on our armour!" He hesitantly gave the order to abandon the drive toward Vitebsk and assist in the destruction of the pockets. On 25 June, Bock moved his headquarters from Posen to Kobryn, a town about 15 mi (24 km) northeast of Brest-Litovsk. On 30 June, the 4th and 9th Armies met each other near Slonim, trapping thousands of Soviet soldiers. However, many Soviet soldiers managed to escape eastward. Bock soon gave the order to disengage from the encirclement and prepare for a full-scale drive to the east. This order once again caused a confrontation between Bock and Brauchitsch.

On 3 July, Bock's forces were once again advancing eastward, with Guderian's tanks crossing the Berezina and Hoth's tanks crossing the Duna. This day marked the furthest distance covered by Bock's troops in a single day, with over 100 mi (160 km) travelled. Four days later, Guderian's tanks crossed the Dnieper, the last great obstacle before Smolensk. However, Guderian was soon ordered by Günther von Kluge to withdraw back across the river. Bock soon reversed this order, and Guderian was allowed to re-cross the river. Bock protested against Kluge's actions to High Command, to no avail. On 11 July, Bock moved his headquarters again to Borisov, a Soviet town near the Berezina River. According to General Günther Blumentritt, as reported by British military historian B.H. Liddell Hart, one reason Kluge privately gave for preferring to interrupt his and Guderian's drive for Moscow in July 1941 and to use their tanks instead for the proposed Kiev encirclement was that the change would temporarily put Kluge under the command of the amiable Rundstedt rather than leaving him under the thumb of Bock, who was "a very difficult man to serve."

=== March on Moscow ===
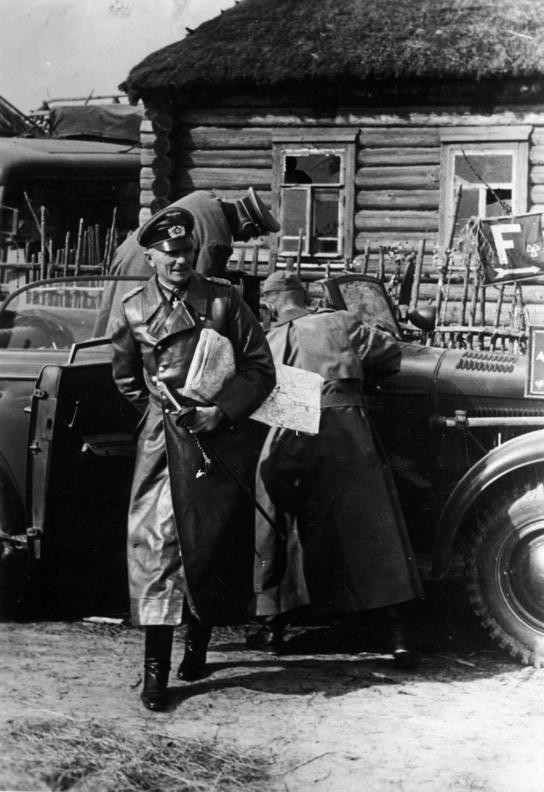
Bock on the Eastern Front during Operation Typhoon, October 1941

On 9 September, Army High Command instructed Bock to prepare an operational order for the assault on Moscow, which was to begin no later than 30 September. Bock supervised the planning and preparation of the operation, and a few days later it was approved by the Army High Command. As part of the preparation, Army Group Center would be reinforced and replenished with men and vehicles; it would be composed of three infantry armies (the 2nd, 4th, and 9th) and three tank armies (2nd, 3rd, and 4th Panzers). Colonel General Erich Hoepner would command the 4th Panzer Army, while the former two were outgrowths of Hoth's and Guderian's original Panzer Groups. The replenishment of Army Group Center for the operation caused it to increase greatly in size: with almost 1.5 million soldiers, it was now larger than it was at the outset of Barbarossa. Bock spent most of the remainder of September on inspection tours of his reinforced Army Group Center. On one occasion, Bock — along with Albert Kesselring — flew over Moscow.

On 29 September, Bock held a conference with his senior commanders Adolf Strauss, Maximilian von Weichs, Hoth, Kluge, Hoepner, Guderian, and Kesselring. During the meeting, the main operational plan was reviewed, with Bock again stressing that Moscow must be taken by 7 November, before the onset of winter, and to coincide with the anniversary of the Russian Revolution. The following day, the operation began with attacks from Guderian's and Hoth's armored forces. Several days later, the infantry armies began to move toward Moscow. With less than 150 km between the most advanced troops and Moscow, Bock estimated that his troops would enter the city in three to four weeks. Almost immediately, Bock's forces encountered stiff Soviet resistance on the road to Moscow. The 2nd Panzer Army, along with the XLVIII Panzer Corps, attacked important rail junctions near Oryol and Bryansk. Hoepner's 4th Panzer Army soon crossed the Desna river and gained access to deep Russian territory. Meanwhile, Hoth's 3rd Panzer Army struck toward Rzhev on the Volga River.

On 3 October, Guderian's forces captured Oryol and subsequently gained access to a paved highway which led to Moscow, some 180 mi (290 km) away. Meanwhile, elements of the 2nd Panzer Army reported that they had bypassed Bryansk and were heading toward Karachev. Bock ordered Guderian to press on toward Tula, but within hours this order had been reversed by Army High Command. The reversal of the order called for Guderian to attack Bryansk where, along with Vyazma, two massive encirclements of Soviet forces were occurring. Bock argued that the area between Oryol and Tula remained relatively free of Soviet forces, and that Tula could be captured within hours. Ultimately, Bock agreed to divert Guderian's tanks toward Bryansk. Cold rain soon began to fall over the northern sectors of Army Group Center's front, and the roads soon turned into quagmires as part of the Rasputitsa. Virtually the entire front became stuck; the only vehicles capable of negotiating the mud were tanks and other tracked vehicles. However, these moved at an extremely slow pace (sometimes less than 2 mi (3.2 km) per day), and fuel consumption soared. This further aggravated the problem of already poor supply lines. Slight improvements in the weather soon made it possible for Bock's forces to continue to seal the pockets around Bryansk and Vyazma. The dual encirclements of Soviet forces around Vyazma and Bryansk yielded some of the largest Soviet casualties since the beginning of Operation Barbarossa: some 650,000 prisoners of war were taken during these two encirclements, after which the Soviet armies facing Bock's Army Group Center no longer had the advantage of superior numbers. Bock was one of the few German officers to protest against the systematic maltreatment of Soviet prisoners of war, but took few steps to improve the conditions of those being held in the areas under his command. The weather soon deteriorated again, with the roads once more turning into impassable, muddy quagmires. Since 30 September, Bock had lost some 35,000 men, 250 tanks and artillery pieces, and several hundred other vehicles, many of which were mired in the mud. Fuel and ammunition supplies became dangerously low. Despite these problems, the advance toward Moscow continued as Hitler became increasingly impatient. When advance units of the 4th Panzer Army reached Kaluga and Maloyaroslavets, German forces were within 40 mi (64 km) of Moscow. Guderian's advance in the south was much slower – an attempt by his forces to capture Tula had failed, with considerable losses of men and tanks. However, other units captured Stalinogorsk and Venyov, indicating the possibility of bypassing Tula.

Bock's forces smashed through the Red Army's Mozhaisk defense lines in mid-October, causing panic to strike in Moscow. Hundreds of thousands of civilians began to evacuate the city while others were forced into emergency volunteer units. Martial law was instituted as looting and pillaging of deserted stores increased. Marshal Semyon Timoshenko was relieved of command in favor of Georgy Zhukov, who had been organizing the defense of Leningrad. The main bulk of the Soviet government was evacuated to Kuibyshev, 500 mi (800 km) southeast of Moscow. However, Soviet leader Joseph Stalin remained in the capital after being reassured by Zhukov that the capital would not fall. The further Bock's forces advanced, the stiffer Soviet resistance became. The paved roads leading to Moscow became craters under constant Russian artillery fire, rendering them impassable. This forced the German troops into the mud and Army Group Center soon became stuck once again. The goal of capturing Moscow by mid-October could no longer be achieved. However, the sheer weight of the German advance could not be fully stopped, and on 21 October units of the 9th Army captured Kalinin.

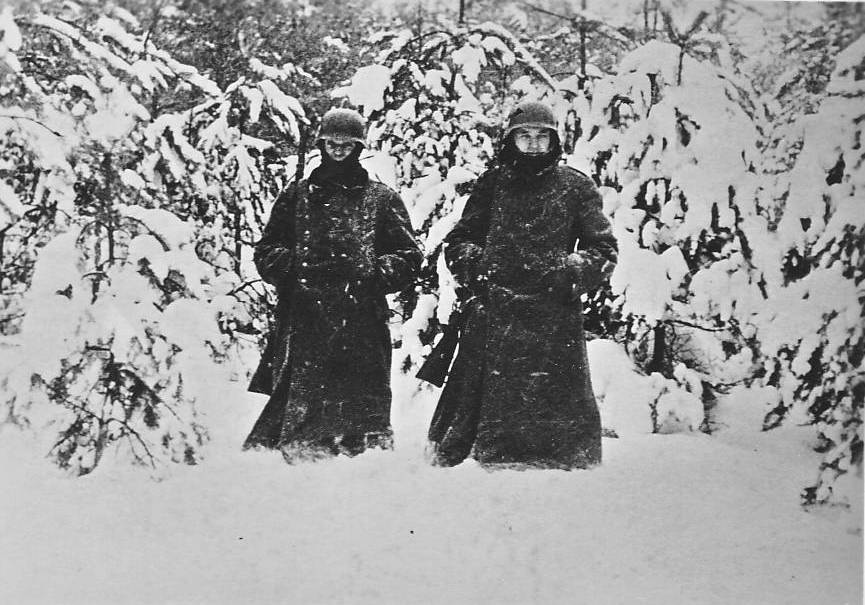
Two German soldiers standing guard in the snow, west of Moscow, December 1941

As November arrived, the mud soon turned into ice as temperatures dropped to −28 °C (−20 °F). While the ground hardened sufficiently enough to support vehicles, the cold weather added to the miseries of the German soldiers as many had not received sufficient winter clothing. Frostbite soon took its toll; many soldiers were severely affected and had to be evacuated. On 20 November, Bock moved his field headquarters to an advanced forward position near the front lines. There he visited an artillery command post, where he could see the buildings of Moscow through his field glasses. Several days later, German forces crossed the Moscow-Volga Canal and reached Khimki but soon fell back due to Soviet resistance. On 29 November, elements of the 4th Panzer Army reached the western suburbs of Moscow. On 4 December, units of the 2nd Army reached Kuntsevo, a western suburb of Moscow. Several units of Guderian's army bypassed Kolomna and reached the Moskva River. Meanwhile, the 3rd Panzer Army once again fought into Khimki. These were the last advances made by Army Group Center under Bock's command.

On 6 December, with the temperature at −45 °C (−50 °F), fresh Soviet troops commanded by Zhukov launched a huge counterattack. German troops along the front near Moscow retreated, destroying whatever equipment they could not salvage. Several days later, Army High Command ordered a halt to all offensive operations. Bock wrote in his diary:

All along, I demanded of Army High Command the authority to strike down the enemy when he was wobbling. We could have finished the enemy last summer. We could have destroyed him completely. Last August, the road to Moscow was open; we could have entered the Bolshevik capital in triumph and in summery weather. The high military leadership of the Fatherland made a terrible mistake when it forced my army group to adopt a position of defense last August. Now all of us are paying for that mistake.

By 13 December, German forces had retreated more than 80 km (50 mi) from Moscow. On 18 December, Bock was relieved of his command of Army Group Center. The official pretext of this decision was health problems. However, this was just one case out of some 40 high-ranking officers being relieved of their command following the failure to capture Moscow.

=== Second Battle of Kharkov and Summer Offensive ===
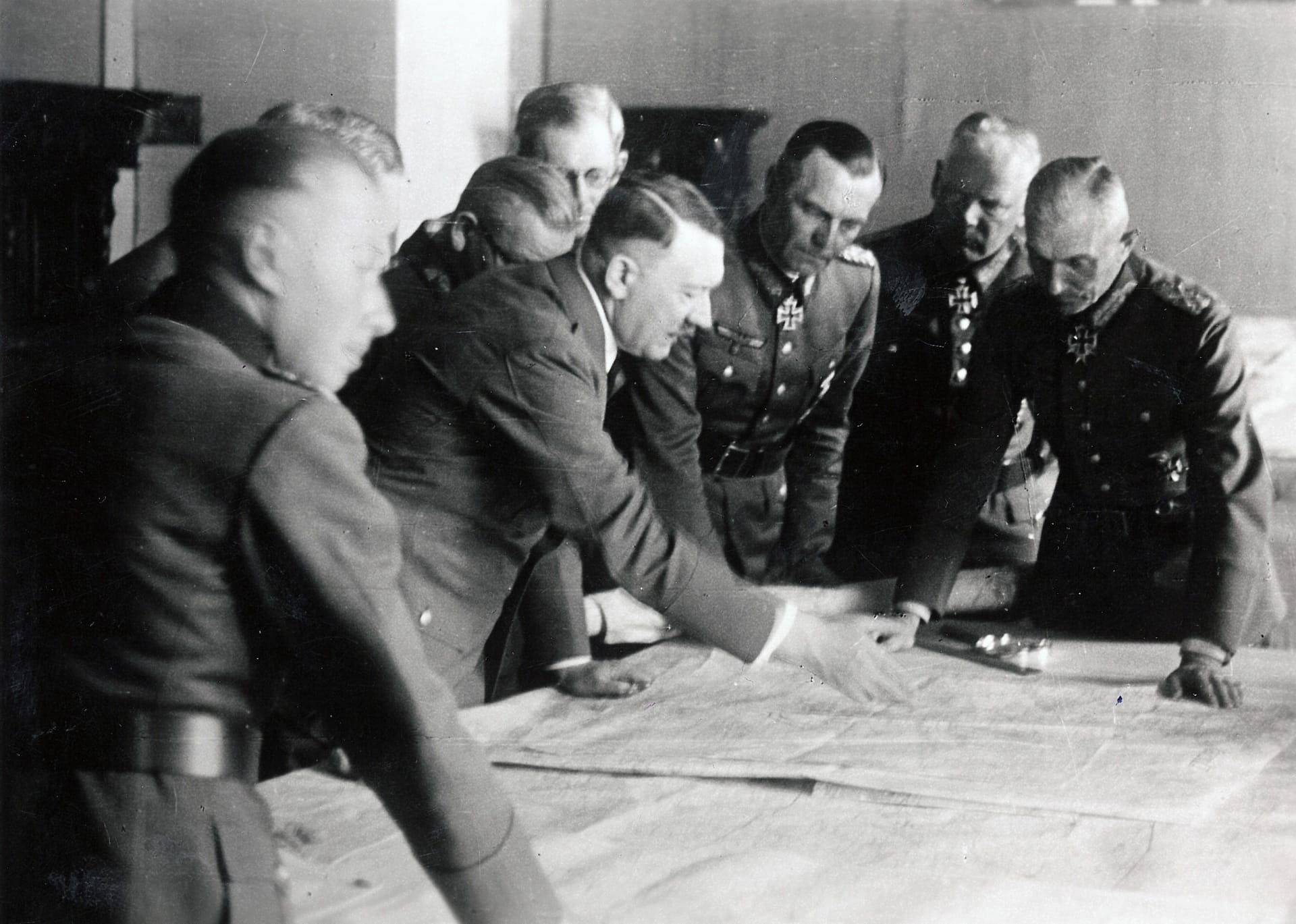
Bock (far right) during a briefing at the headquarters of Army Group South with Hitler, June 1942

Bock was reassigned to lead Army Group South on 20 January 1942, after the death of Generalfeldmarshall Walter von Reichenau from a stroke in Ukraine. Thus, in May 1942, he commanded the defending forces that delivered the devastating defeat to the Soviet winter offensive, and severely depleted Soviet tank strength in the Second Battle of Kharkov. On 28 June 1942, Bock's offensive split the Soviet front into fragments on either side of Kursk. Three armies (Weich's 2nd Army, Hoth's 4th Panzer, and Friedrich Paulus' 6th Army), along with 11 panzer divisions, fanned out toward Voronezh and the Don river. Paulus' armoured divisions reached the Don on either side of Voronezh on 5 July. The Soviet High Command created a Voronezh Front under Nikolai Vatutin, who reported directly to Moscow. Bock wanted to eliminate Vatutin's forces before extending his own flank too deeply into the void created by the strength and speed of the German offensive. Hitler was not pleased with Bock's plan to delay the push toward Stalingrad.

== Later years and death ==
On 7 July, Hitler split Army Group South into Army Groups A and B. Army Group A was given to Field Marshal Wilhelm List to command. On 17 July, Hitler relieved Bock as commander of Army Group B, replacing him with Maximilian von Weichs. Bock was moved to the Führerreserve but never again occupied a senior command position. He spent the rest of the war living a quiet life in Bavaria after effectively being forced into retirement. Henning von Tresckow, who was married to a cousin of Bock, tried several times to win him over to the resistance against Hitler within the military. He condemned the 20 July plot, the assassination attempt on Hitler on 20 July 1944, as a crime. After Hitler's suicide on 30 April 1945, he offered himself to the new government under Admiral Karl Dönitz.

On 3 May 1945, Bock's car was strafed by a Royal New Zealand Air Force Hawker Tempest from No. 486 Squadron RNZAF near Lensahn while evacuating to Hamburg. The strafe severely wounded Bock, and killed his wife Wilhelmine, his stepdaughter Katharina, and a friend driving the car. Initially the only survivor of the attack, Bock died of his injuries the following day at a naval hospital in Oldenburg in Holstein. He was buried in Friedhof Lensahn cemetery in Lensahn.

== Awards ==
- Order of the Crown, 4th class (Prussia, 13 September 1911)
- Iron Cross of 1914
  - 2nd class – 18 September 1914
  - 1st class – 30 October 1916
- Knight's Cross of the Royal House Order of Hohenzollern with Swords (25 October 1916)
- Military Merit Cross, 3rd class with war decoration (Austria-Hungary, 24 June 1915)
- Order of the Iron Crown, 3rd class with war decoration (Austria, 9 February 1917)
- Military Merit Cross, 2nd class (Mecklenburg-Schwerin, 3 August 1917)
- Hanseatic Crosses of Hamburg (19 September 1917) and Bremen (30 January 1918)
- Order of the Zähringer Lion, Knight 1st class with Swords (Baden, 10 January 1918)
- Order of the Crown, Knight's Cross with Swords (Württemberg 25 January 1918)
- Pour le Mérite (1 April 1918)
- Order of Military Merit, Commander's Cross (Bulgaria, 2 August 1918)
- Service Award (1920)
- Silesian Eagle, 1st and 2nd class (15 April 1921)
- Wehrmacht Long Service Award, 1st class with 4th class; Oak Leaves added on 12 September 1939
- Anschluss Medal
- Sudetenland Medal
- Order of the Yugoslav Crown, 1st class (June 1939)
- Clasp to the Iron Cross, 1st and 2nd class (22 September 1939)
- Grand Cross of the Order of the Crown of Italy (27 August 1940)
- Order of Michael the Brave (Romania)
  - 3rd class – 29 July 1942
  - 1st class – September 1942
- Grand Cross of the Order of Merit of the Kingdom of Hungary with Swords (27 November 1942)
- Knight's Cross of the Iron Cross on 30 September 1939 as Generaloberst and Commander-in-Chief of Heeresgruppe Nord

== See also ==
- Bribery of senior Wehrmacht officers

== Sources ==
- Afflerbach, Holger (1996). Falkenhayn: Politisches Denken und Handeln im Kaiserreich. Munich: Oldenbourg.
- Beevor, Antony (1998). Stalingrad, the Fateful Siege: 1942–1943. Harmondsworth, United Kingdom: Penguin Putnam Inc. ISBN 978-0-670-87095-0.
- Evans, Richard J. (2008). The Third Reich at War: 1939–1945. London: Allen Lane. ISBN 978-0-7139-9742-2.
- Gerbet, Klaus and Johnston, David. Generalfeldmarschall Fedor von Bock: The War Diary 1939–1945. Schiffer Publishing. 1 January 2000
- Glantz, David M.; House, Jonathan (2009). To the Gates of Stalingrad: Soviet-German Combat Operations, April–August 1942. Lawrence, Kansas: University Press of Kansas. ISBN 978-0-7006-1630-5.
- Horner, D. M., Jukes, Geoffrey. The Second World War: The Eastern Front 1941–1945. Osprey Publishing (25 July 2002)
- Scherzer, Veit (2007). Die Ritterkreuzträger 1939–1945 [The Knight's Cross Bearers 1939–1945] (in German). Jena, Germany: Scherzers Militaer-Verlag. ISBN 978-3-938845-17-2.
- Mitcham, Samuel W. (2009). The Men of Barbarossa: Commanders of the German Invasion of Russia, 1941. Philadelphia: Casemate.
- Turney, Alfred W. (1971). Disaster at Moscow: von Bock's Campaigns 1941–42. Cassell & Co. ISBN 0-826-3-01-673.
- Wheeler-Bennett, John (1967). The Nemesis of Power: The German Army in Politics, 1918–1945. London: Macmillan. ISBN 978-1-4039-1812-3.

Military offices
Preceded by none	Commander of Heeresgruppe Nord; 27 August 1939 – 20 June 1941	Succeeded by Wilhelm Ritter von Leeb
Preceded by none	Commander of Heeresgruppe Mitte; 22 June – 19 December 1941	Succeeded by Günther von Kluge
Awards and achievements
Preceded by Sir Claude Auchinleck	Cover of Time magazine 8 December 1941	Succeeded by Husband E. Kimmel
Preceded by Sir Harold Alexander	Cover of Time magazine 21 September 1942	Succeeded by William Francis Gibbs
