= Bruno Ernst Buchrucker =

German officer (1878–1966)

Bruno Ernst Buchrucker (5 January 1878 in Bad Sobernheim, German Empire – 19 February 1966 in Bad Godesberg near Bonn, West Germany) was a German military officer known for leading the 1923 Küstrin Putsch.

== Military career ==
Buchrucker became an officer in the Prussian Army on 20 July 1897 and was assigned to its General Staff in April 1909. On 20 March 1911 he was promoted to captain and became head of a company of infantry stationed in Alsace–Lorraine, which had been annexed from France by Germany in 1871 as a result of the Franco-Prussian War. In December 1913, he witnessed the Zabern Affair in the course of which officers of the regiment seized civil power, and the military acted with disproportionate severity against the local population for protesting insulting remarks made by a German officer. To defuse tension during the conflict, Buchrucker's unit was withdrawn from Saverne (German: Zabern) and temporarily relocated to Bitsch, also in Alsace–Lorraine. Buchrucker returned to his regular position in April 1914.

At the beginning of the First World War, he was assigned as a staff officer to the XIV Reserve Corps which initially operated in Alsace but was soon moved to the Somme. During the course of the war, he was employed in various general staff positions, and he was promoted to major on 22 March 1916 "after rigorous combat leadership". After the end of the war, Buchrucker led the 1st Battalion of the Freikorps in the Baltic, an anticommunist paramilitary unit that fought in the Baltic states. When he returned to Germany, he was accepted into the provisional Reichswehr, the precursor of Germany's official army during the Weimar Republic.

== Kapp Putsch in Cottbus ==
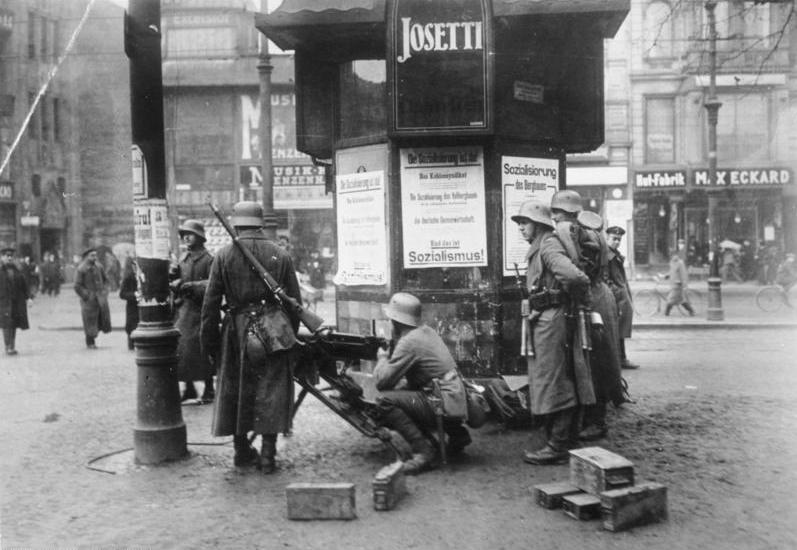
Soldiers in Berlin during the Kapp Putsch.

As garrison commander in Cottbus, Buchrucker supported the March 1920 Kapp Putsch against the German government. On 13 March mutinous troops occupied the Berlin government district and the Reich government fled to Stuttgart via Dresden. Buchrucker banned demonstrations and rallies in Cottbus and took over executive power. In response to the general strike, which the Majority Social Democratic Party (MSPD) government and trade unions called to protest the putsch, he used posters that promised, "Protection for those willing to work!" As Reichswehr patrols encountered resistance on 15 March, they, at Buchrucker's instigation, fired with machine guns at a fleeing crowd. Four people died and five were seriously wounded. Meanwhile, Reichswehr troops broke into the printing house of the newspaper Freier Volkswille belonging to the more radical Independent Social Democratic Party (USPD) and destroyed its high-speed printing presses with hand grenades.

On 16 March, fights that claimed additional victims developed on the outskirts of Cottbus between the Reichswehr and workers from Niederlausitz. "Large gatherings... brought a tremendously enthusiastic crowd together. The decision was made to set up a Red Guard, the ruler of Cottbus then forbade any gathering with instructions to disperse every crowd with rifle fire" – so said the social democratic "Märkische Volksstimme" on 21 March. On 17 March a social democratic delegation tried to negotiate with Buchrucker. According to information from a deputy who took part, Buchrucker uttered sentiments such as "My comparison is the murder weapon. The more of the rabble I gun down, the better I like it". "This red army consists of criminals and bushwhackers, shooting is the radical remedy". "I'll let every picketer be shot point blank". On 18 and 19 March, the fighting was concentrated in the Sandow district of Cottbus. Given the resistance and the failure of the Kapp Putsch in Berlin on 17 March, Buchrucker publicly announced the lifting of his extraordinary measures and his resignation of executive power in Cottbus. His unit was temporarily relocated to Vetschau.

Buchrucker was dismissed from the Reichswehr in September 1920. He was one of the few Reichswehr officers to be dismissed as a result of his behavior during the Kapp Putsch.

In May 1921, Buchrucker headed a supply centre in Cottbus for the Freikorps fighting in the Silesian Uprisings. He and his longtime friend Wilhelm von Oppen were the leading functionaries of the Brandenburg homeland association (Heimatbund). The homeland associations were successor organisation to the civil guards (Einwohnerwehren) that had been dissolved on 8 April 1920 under pressure from the Entente Powers. Buchrucker also maintained contacts with Gerhard Roßbach and his officially-dissolved Freikorps, whose members were disguised on agricultural estates in Brandenburg, Mecklenburg and Pomerania.

== Black Reichswehr ==
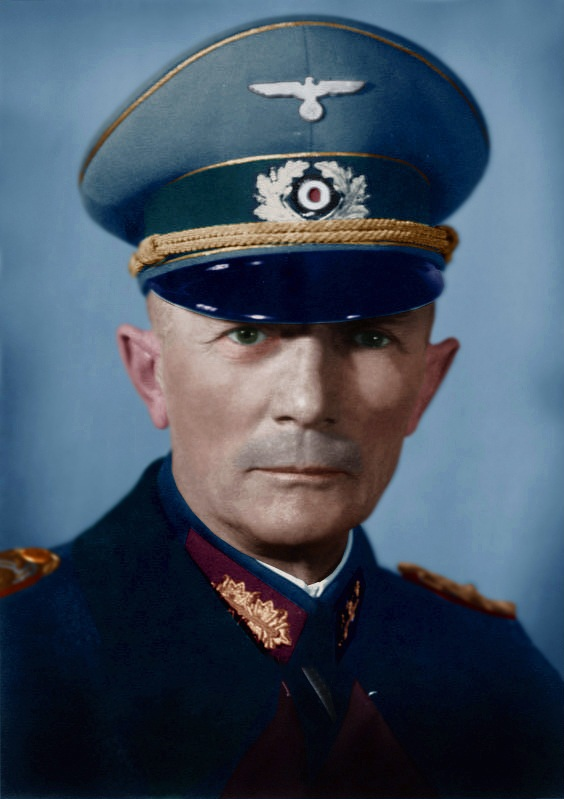
Fedor von Bock in later years in Nazi-era Wehrmacht uniform.

In the summer of 1921, Buchrucker was employed by Military District III of the Reichswehr under a private service contract. Subordinate to Fedor von Bock, Buchrucker was in command of the so-called labor commandos (Arbeitskommandos), whose official role was defined by Defense Minister Otto Geßler in 1926 to be the "clearing up, sorting out and destruction of the countless pieces of war equipment scattered and hidden, especially in the area of Berlin, the Ostmark, and Silesia". In addition, according to Geßler, "a kind of refuge for the forces that had become rootless as a result of the dissolution of the Freikorps and the self-protection units (Selbstschutz) of Upper Silesia" should be created. By the summer of 1923 – contrary to the provisions of the Treaty of Versailles which limited the size of German's armed forces – a Black Reichswehr was established with a permanent base of 2,000 men and an additional 18,000 men in quick response units. The latter came predominantly from nationalist associations and had received military training in four to six-week courses.

Within the Black Reichswehr, which was kept secret, Buchrucker was responsible for organisation and management. His most important colleague was Paul Schulz, who had been in the same Freikorps as Buchrucker in 1919 and had worked with him to support the Freikorps in Upper Silesia in 1921. Buchrucker dealt with political questions, and Schulz was considered the "head of it all".

In an atmosphere, which, according to Buchrucker's later statements, was characterised on the part of the responsible Reichswehr officers by internal agreement but rejection of official responsibility, the size of the labor commandos was expanded beyond what had been intended and military exercises unnecessary for their original purpose were held. At the end of September 1923, higher-ranking offices of the Reichswehr noticed the large size of the commandos. Buchrucker was taken to task and admitted that he had made budgetary adjustments to the troops on his own initiative with the idea of creating help for the Reichswehr in the event of a communist uprising, which he expected immediately. He promised to reduce the reinforcements, but for Reichswehr Minister Geßler, "faith in the reliability of Major (ret.) Buchrucker [...] was shaken", and he ordered the arrest of Buchrucker and Schulz.

== Küstrin Putsch ==
The Küstrin Putsch, also known as the Buchrucker Putsch, was prompted by anger over the Reich government's decision to call an end to passive resistance to the French and Belgian occupation of the Ruhr, the Reichswehr's order to disband the labor commandos, and the arrest warrant against Buchrucker for misuse of the labor commandos. According to his own account, Buchrucker learned of the warrant on 30 September 1923 in Berlin, drove to Küstrin and ordered for the labor commandos housed in the outer part of the Küstrin Fortress to move into the fortress in the Old Town of Küstrin on the morning of 1 October 1923. The putsch began with a speech by Buchrucker in front of the labor commandos that, according to statements at his trial from some who heard it, was barely comprehensible:

"He started to speak, produced sounds, lined up the words senselessly, emphasized incorrectly and gesticulated. Nobody knew what the accused [Buchrucker] wanted to say".

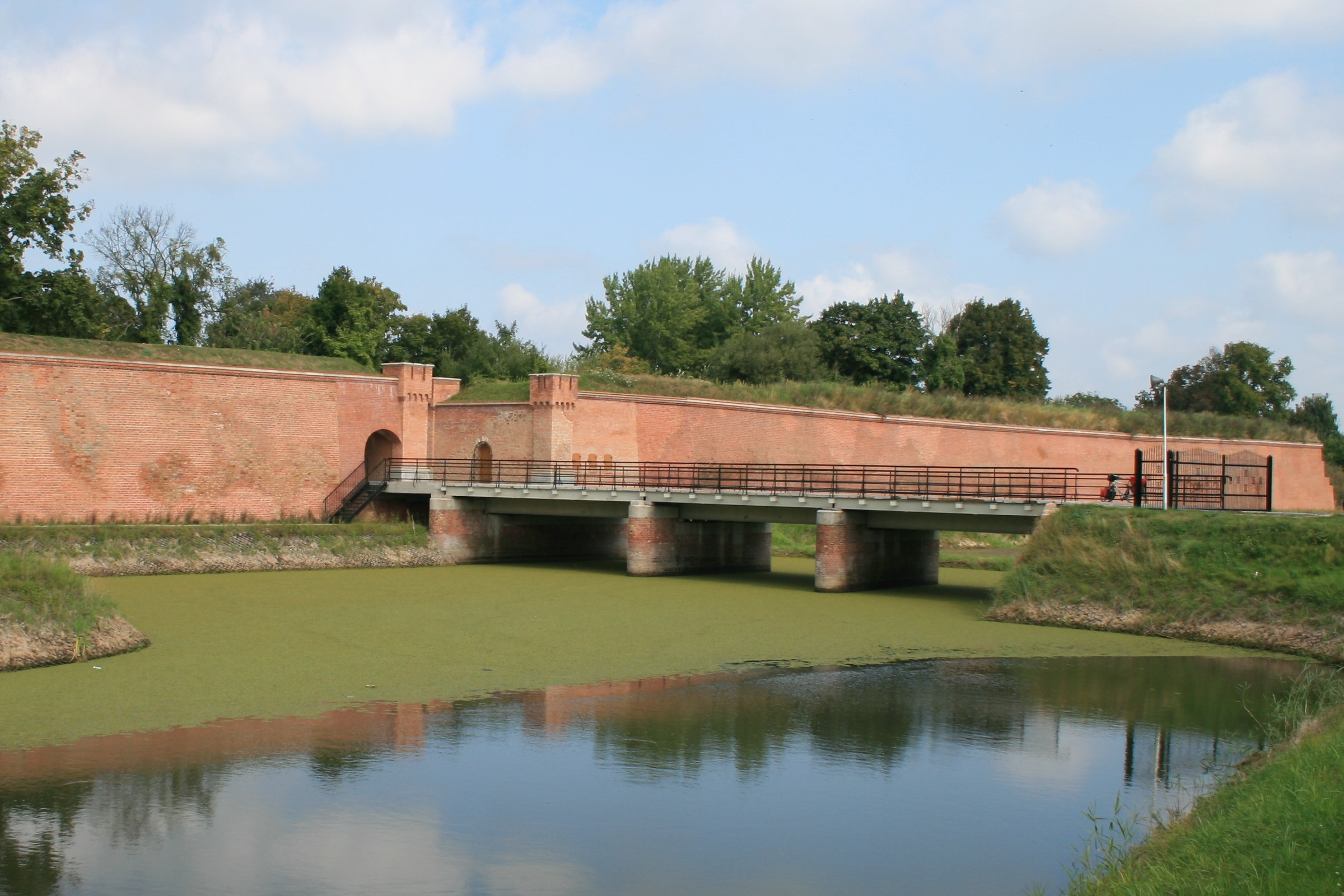
Küstrin fortifications.

Buchrucker then went to the fortress commander Colonel Gudowius, pointed out the superior strength of his units and told him that he should not stand in his way and that the great national moment had now come. He also declared that he would strike in Küstrin but everywhere else at the same time. The commandant refused to join Buchrucker, even after several officers who supported him forcibly entered the office. When asked for instructions by his subordinates, Buchrucker could not to give any. This prompted some of them to put themselves under Gudowius's command. Later that day, a regular Reichswehr unit, which had been summoned to Küstrin, fired on a group of Black Reichswehr labor commandos, killing one and wounding seven others.

Between 22 and 27 October 1923, the trial of 14 people arrested in Küstrin took place before an extraordinary court in Cottbus. Buchrucker was sentenced to ten years imprisonment and a fine of ten gold marks for perpetrating high treason. He had declared in court that he had wanted only to put pressure on the Reichswehr Minister to have the arrest warrant against him withdrawn. That was in the interests of the state, he said, because there were "daredevils" in the ranks of the labor commandos from whom violence was to be feared if he was arrested. The court did not accept his account. According to the reasons given for the verdict, there were sufficient indications that "the events in Küstrin were indeed only part of a large-scale enterprise". Buchrucker's overall efforts and his one-hour period of indecision were indications that he had more serious decisions that he needed to consider. It was thought that Buchrucker had also assumed that the Reichswehr would join him or remain neutral. He was given amnesty in October 1927 on the 80th birthday of President Paul von Hindenburg.

An investigation into the goals of the Black Reichswehr was not made part of the Cottbus criminal proceedings. Witness statements before parliamentary committees of inquiry and in the trials for the Feme murders, politically motivated killings perpetrated by both the Black Reichswehr and a number of far-right groups, contained numerous indications that a march on Berlin was being planned and prepared in detail within the Black Reichswehr on the pattern of Benito Mussolini's March on Rome. As far as is known today, the Küstrin Putsch represents a sequel to those plans, and its actual purpose is not known for certain. Buchrucker commented on the Black Reichswehr in 1928 in the publication 'In Seeckt's Shadow' (Im Schatten Seeckt's):

"The troops wanted to free Germany from pressure from abroad. They wanted to fight the external enemy. As far as they thought about the political situation, they believed that the struggle could only be fought under a military dictatorship, and many thought that when the military dictatorship was established there could be a brief internal struggle within the Reich. Most of the time, no one thought about whether or not the military dictatorship was constitutional".

In May 1928, the Reichswehr Ministry filed a criminal complaint against Buchrucker for perjury. He had stated in a trial about the Feme murders that enlistment in the Black Reichswehr in September 1923 had taken place in agreement with the regular Reichswehr. The trial was accompanied by a high level of public interest and was carried out with great effort from both prosecution and defense. In September 1929, the case against Buchrucker was dropped. According to the Berlin prosecutor's office, Buchrucker's statement was objectively incorrect, but it could not be proven that he was objectively aware of the incorrectness of his statement.

In the course of the perjury proceedings, the chief of staff in Military District III, Kurt von Hammerstein, requested an examination of Buchrucker's mental state. In the Cottbus proceedings, Buchrucker's defense lawyer had requested for his client to be acquitted on the grounds of partial insanity, but Buchrucker had refused the proposal. According to the defense attorney's files, Buchrucker had developed remarkably slowly as a child. In the spring of 1917, during the First World War, he attracted attention because of his "confusion of language, senseless juxtaposition of words and sentences, incorrect emphasis, and eccentricity in tone and expression". One of those questioned at the proceedings described Buchrucker as a "kind of Nietzsche-Zarathustra figure", his extraordinary abilities as a general staff officer contrasted with moments of depression and immobility. Reference was made also to Buchrucker's speech during the Küstrin putsch and to his arrest there during which he gave the impression of deep depression and lack of will.

The magazine Die Weltbühne, which was instrumental in uncovering the Feme murders within the Black Reichswehr and therefore itself affected by criminal proceedings, expressed its respect to Buchrucker in 1930:

"We got to know you in our Feme trial as a straight, truth-loving person. We had expected a swashbuckler in the man from Küstrin and found a fine, clever head – an opponent as one would wish him to be. Dear Mr. Buchrucker,... you have been involved in many activities and you have always been the one who was betrayed, the one locked up, while the higher-ranking people shirked responsibility".

== Follower of Otto Strasser ==
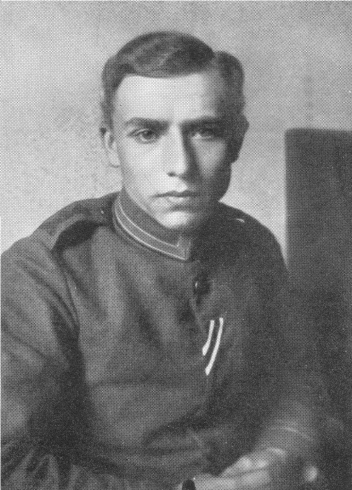
Otto Strasser in 1915.

Buchrucker joined the Nazi Party (NSDAP) in 1926 and, in late 1928, more accidentally than deliberately, became part of the group around Otto Strasser, which belonged to the "left" wing of the NSDAP. According to his own statement, Strasser, unlike other publishers, was ready to publish Buchrucker's book on the Black Reichswehr. The "Buchrucker who thinks along the lines of the Wilhelmine officer's authoritarian state" held a special position in the Strasser group. He considered programmatic issues to be insignificant and saw monarchy as the most powerful form of government. He wrote regularly on military-political issues in newspapers published by Strasser. "The modern state would have to be led by men who understand war", Buchrucker wrote in one of the articles.

In July 1930, Buchrucker followed Strasser in leaving the NSDAP. There had previously been disputes between Strasser and Adolf Hitler over Hitler's policy regarding what was legal. On 4 July, Buchrucker, to whom Strasser referred as his "best friend", was one of the 26 signatories of the appeal "The Socialists are leaving the NSDAP". He then joined the Combat League of Revolutionary National Socialists (KGRNS) around Strasser. Until the prohibition of the KGRNS shortly after the National Socialist seizure of power in January 1933, Buchrucker belonged to the group's governing bodies, which existed under the names "political office", "executive committee" and "executive council".

At the time of his work in the KGRNS, Buchrucker was described as a nationalist and passionate militarist who continued to deal with contemporary strategic military considerations such as the use of the air force. Contrary to the official line of the KGRNS, he was sharply opposed to collaborating with communist groups and gave preference to alliances with conservative reactionary paramilitary organizations such as the Stahlhelm.

For the first Reich Congress of the KGRNS, in late October 1930, Buchrucker formulated "Programmatic Principles of the Revolutionary National Socialists – the New Order", which largely corresponded to earlier publications by Strasser. Buchrucker's ideas of "German socialism" included a nationalisation program, the promotion of craft businesses and the return of the urban population to agriculture. Decision-making authority should be given to a small group of leaders to overcome the imbalances of a state weakened by bureaucracy. An "organic leader-state", which emerged in that way, should then promote the völkisch transformation of society, the goal being the basis of the unity of Germanic nationality, a "Germany liberated from the imperialist chains of Versailles".

The KGRNS remained a splinter group. In May 1931, it had around 6,000 members, which after the Stennes revolt the same month were joined by around 2,000 members from the Nazi Sturmabteilung (SA), mainly from Berlin and Pomerania. Buchrucker was the object of regular assaults by the SA. In July 1930, he was wounded in Albersdorf during an attack by SA units led by Gauleiter Hinrich Lohse. In October 1932, the Third Reich Congress of the KGRNS decided to set up its own paramilitary formation, the "Black Guard". Buchrucker became one of the two group leaders of the Black Guard, which had a maximum of 200 to 300 members.

After the National Socialist seizure of power, the KGRNS and its subsidiary organizations were banned in February 1933, and Buchrucker was temporarily held in custody. The information on the rest of Buchrucker's life is fragmentary. In connection with the 1934 Night of the Long Knives, a political cleansing operation in the course of which Hitler and other National Socialist leaders had the actual or alleged rivals in their own ranks along with other unwanted people eliminated, Buchrucker was arrested but was later released at the insistence of Hermann Göring and reactivated for the Wehrmacht. Shortly after the outbreak of the Second World War, Buchrucker is said to have been retired from the Wehrmacht with the rank of lieutenant colonel. In his 1953 publication "The Soldier's Honour" (Die Ehre des Soldaten), Buchrucker claimed to have repudiated Hitler as a criminal.

== Family ==
His son Hasso Buchrucker (born 1935) was a diplomat in the Foreign Office who served ambassador to Hungary and Mozambique. He was also related to Lutheran theologian Karl Buchrucker.
