= Battle of Maastricht =

1940 battle in the Netherlands during WWII

Coordinates: 50.8500°N 5.6833°E

- Part of the Western Front of World War II
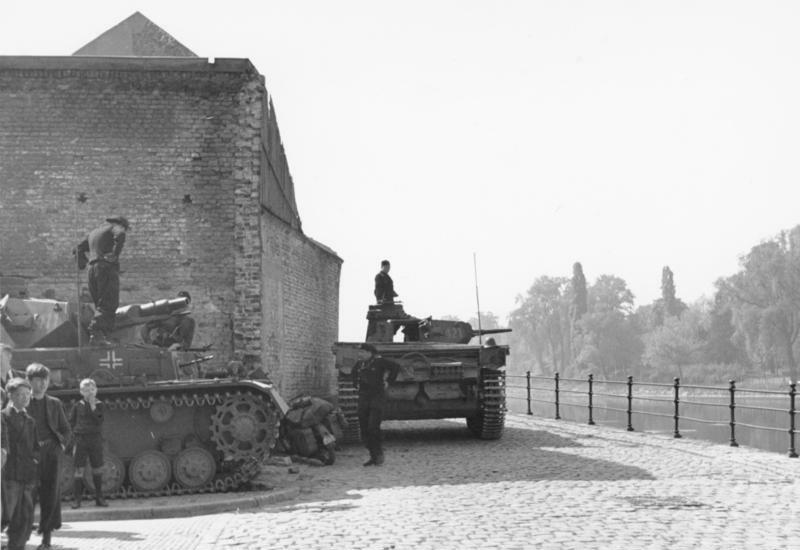
- German Panzers in Maastricht (10 May 1940)
Date	10 May 1940
Location	Maastricht, Netherlands, and the surrounding area
Result	German victory
Territorial changes	Germans capture Maastricht

Belligerents
Netherlands	Germany

Commanders and leaders
(Netherlands) Henri Winkelman	(Nazi Germany) Fedor von Bock

Strength
750 soldiers 4+ anti-tank guns 4 AA guns	7th Air Division; 4th Tank Division; 343 tanks

Casualties and losses
47 killed	186 killed 9 tanks destroyed 9 armoured cars destroyed 10 aircraft shot down

The Battle of Maastricht was one of the first battles that took place during the German Campaign on the Western Front during World War II. Maastricht was a key city in order to capture the Belgian Fort Eben-Emael and split the allied armies in half.

The German goal of the operation was to take the main bridges over the river Maas intact, to have an easier road to central Belgium. Therefore, the Germans sent in teams disguised as civilians whose job was to sabotage the bridge charges. However, they were spotted and arrested, and when they attempted to run, shot.

== Prelude ==
In May 1940, the German Army executed Fall Gelb, the plan for the conquest of the Low Countries to gain a base for air-attacks on the United Kingdom and a possible continued offensive to occupy the whole of France, the so-called Fall Rot. Between September 1939, the start of the Second World War, and May 1940, the plans had changed often and fundamentally. By March 1940, the General staff had accepted a proposal by Erich von Manstein to let the smaller Army Group B lure the best French and British divisions into central Belgium in order to have them cut off by a surprise advance through the difficult terrain of the Ardennes by the larger Army Group A.

To make that feint possible, Army Group B would have to move as quickly as possible towards central Belgium. The Belgians fully understood the importance of the key border positions. When during the 1930s the Albert Canal was constructed, a deep waterway allowing the largest motorised riverboats to sail from Antwerp to the Meuse, a continuous line of pill-boxes was excavated into the rock face. Where the canal met the Meuse one of the most modern forts of the period was deeply dug into the natural marl rock. Consisting of a number of artificial tunnels made it practically impervious to air or artillery bombardments. The gun turrets of the fort controlled the canal bridges at this point. To neutralise them was an absolute precondition for a fast advance. To this end Adolf Hitler personally devised a commando operation to land with twelve glider planes on the top of the fort complex and penetrate with heavy hollow charges the cannon turrets. However, even if this high risk endeavour would succeed, it would still be necessary for ground forces to link up with airborne troops and take the bridges.

The Germans could not reach the Albert Canal directly. It was shielded by the south of the Dutch province of Limburg, the so-called "Dutch Appendix". The river Meuse or Maas runs through it to the north. The main east-west road crosses the river at the fortress city of Maastricht. This strategic position was the main reason the city became part of the Dutch Republic in the first place when it was captured in 1632 by stadtholder Frederick Henry, prince of Orange. In subsequent centuries, the city was repeatedly besieged. During the Belgian Revolution of 1830, the garrison remained loyal to the Kingdom of Netherlands. In 1839 the area was split between a Dutch part and a Belgian part immediately bordering Maastricht to the southwest. As a result, in the opening phases of the First World War, in which the Dutch were not attacked, during August 1914 the German Army had to squeeze itself awkwardly under the Appendix to reach Liège. At the end of the war, in 1918, the Belgians understood that in future conflicts the Germans would not limit themselves so and demanded that South-Limburg would be ceded to them to improve their defences. The Dutch protested vehemently and the Allies refused to impose the annexation. This was the reason the Belgians had to block the Maastricht-Liège axis with a special large fort on their side of the border.

== Allied strategies ==
The Low Countries offered many geographical advantages to withstand a German attack. North of the French Maginot Line the Ardennes stretched out, a densely forested semi-mountainous area with a very poor road network. The few routes available winded through deep ravines, bridging torrents, offering many natural ambush and blocking positions. At Maastricht this zone connected to the river Maas running from south to north which in turn via canals and the Lower Rhine connects to the IJssel and Lake IJssel.

== Battle ==
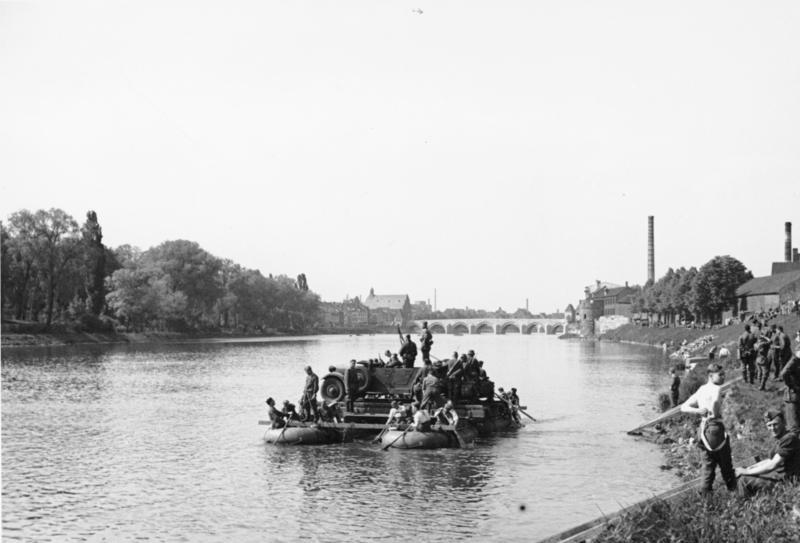
Germans crossing the Maas river in Maastricht, 10 May 1940

The sluice complex at Borgharen—just north of Maastricht—was another waterworks that could not be destroyed. A section of infantry was stationed there. Close to the bridge, a casemate with a machine gun could assist. In the early morning hours, a patrol of six motorised infantrymen approached the eastern guard post. They were a reconnaissance party of the Hocke squad. They were ordered to stop, and four of them were taken prisoner. The other two were able to escape. The Dutch Lieutenant was confident that more would be coming, and he ordered his men to remain prepared. Not much later, more German soldiers appeared on motorcycles. The Dutch let them approach to within 50 m (55 yd), then opened fire with two machine guns and every rifle available. The Germans temporarily retreated. However, when the Germans brought in reinforcements, the squad was overwhelmed. The defenders tried to draw back to the sluice. The move was difficult under ever-increasing German fire. The men at the sluice itself were able to resist the Germans, but the southeastern squad—which defended the northern entrance into Maastricht—had to give in when their machine gun failed. The gap that now existed in the outer defences of the city was soon penetrated by the majority of the Germans that had agitated against the sluice.

The 4. Panzerdivision encountered resistance around Gulpen, delaying them for hours. A column instructed to advance against Maastricht from the south was able to move forward faster. It appeared in front of the outer defences at Heugem. There, the barricades had been sealed and locked as instructed. The defending unit was ordered to move back behind the Maas once it become clear that the outer defences had been penetrated.

It was now up to the rearguard of the outer defences to slow down the German advance. The rearguard managed to destroy two armored cars and block the road for the remaining cars. When the German infantry had almost reached its position the commanding Dutch sergeant ordered an organised retreat. The squad safely reached the west bank of the Maas a little later.

By this time, only the railway bridge remained intact. The Germans felt that it could be a very useful crossing point for tanks, and only 35 Dutch soldiers defended it. As the Germans advanced to the bridge, they were briefly held off by the Dutch defenders. A few German soldiers were killed. However, the Dutch soon fell back because of overwhelming numbers. As the Germans began to cross the bridge, the charges were planted and the bridge fell into the river. After all of the bridges over the Maas River were destroyed, the only task that remained was to hold off the Germans as long as possible.

At the destroyed bridges in Maastricht, stray Dutch units continued piecemeal attacks on the Germans; the Dutch had spread over many strategic points, including a sniper squad in the towers of the bridge. When the Germans boldly placed an anti-tank gun in front of the bridge, aimed at the adjacent St. Servaasbrug, the Dutch instantly killed the crew. A new crew shared the same fate. A small number of rubber boats tried to cross the Maas but were shot to pieces. Then the Germans retreated from this location.

At the destroyed railway bridge, the heaviest fighting would be seen. What remained of the German squad that had tried to take the bridge was soon reinforced by the main German force. Two armored cars tried to approach the east bank but were destroyed by two anti-tank rifles. A light tank was also put out of action by the AT rifles. The German losses were high. However, soon after, three more German armored cars approached. The situation for the light Dutch infantry had become critical. Many defenders were killed or wounded by the German fire, and soon one of the two anti-tank rifles was destroyed. The headquarters were contacted to report the situation. From this contact, it became clear that the Dutch resistance at Maastricht had been ordered to cease.

Luitenant-Kolonel Govers, Territorial Commander (TC) of Limburg, had called a meeting later in the day. The German battle plans had been found on a German POW in the morning. All German units were mentioned in the plans and maps with directions had been part of the catch. It was clear that all bridges had been destroyed. It was also clear than an entire German tank division was deployed in southern Limburg. The TC had only two companies left under his command, without anti-tank guns or artillery. The ancient city of Maastricht, with all its cultural heritage, should not suffer more than necessary. The outcome of the meeting was that all further opposition to the Germans in and around Maastricht, the last standing defences in Limburg, would cease. The TC himself went to the Wilhelminabrug under a truce flag. Soon, contact was established. A few hours later, all Dutch troops in Maastricht and its surroundings capitulated.

== Aftermath ==
The battle in South-Limburg (Sector Roosteren – Maastricht) had cost the lives of 47 Dutch soldiers (two officers, seven NCOs, 38 corporals and soldiers). The German losses are again not known in detail, although at some scenes accurate figures are available. It is estimated that between 130–190 Germans died due to the fighting in the south. After the battle, it was reported that 186 German bodies were found. It is confirmed from German material-states that nine armored cars and tanks were destroyed in Limburg. Also, 10 German aircraft—mainly Junkers Ju 52s and Ju 87s—crashed or were shot down in Zuid-Limburg.

== See also ==
- List of Dutch military equipment of World War II
- List of German military equipment of World War II
