= Hans von Seeckt =

German officer (1866–1936)

Generaloberst Hans von Seeckt
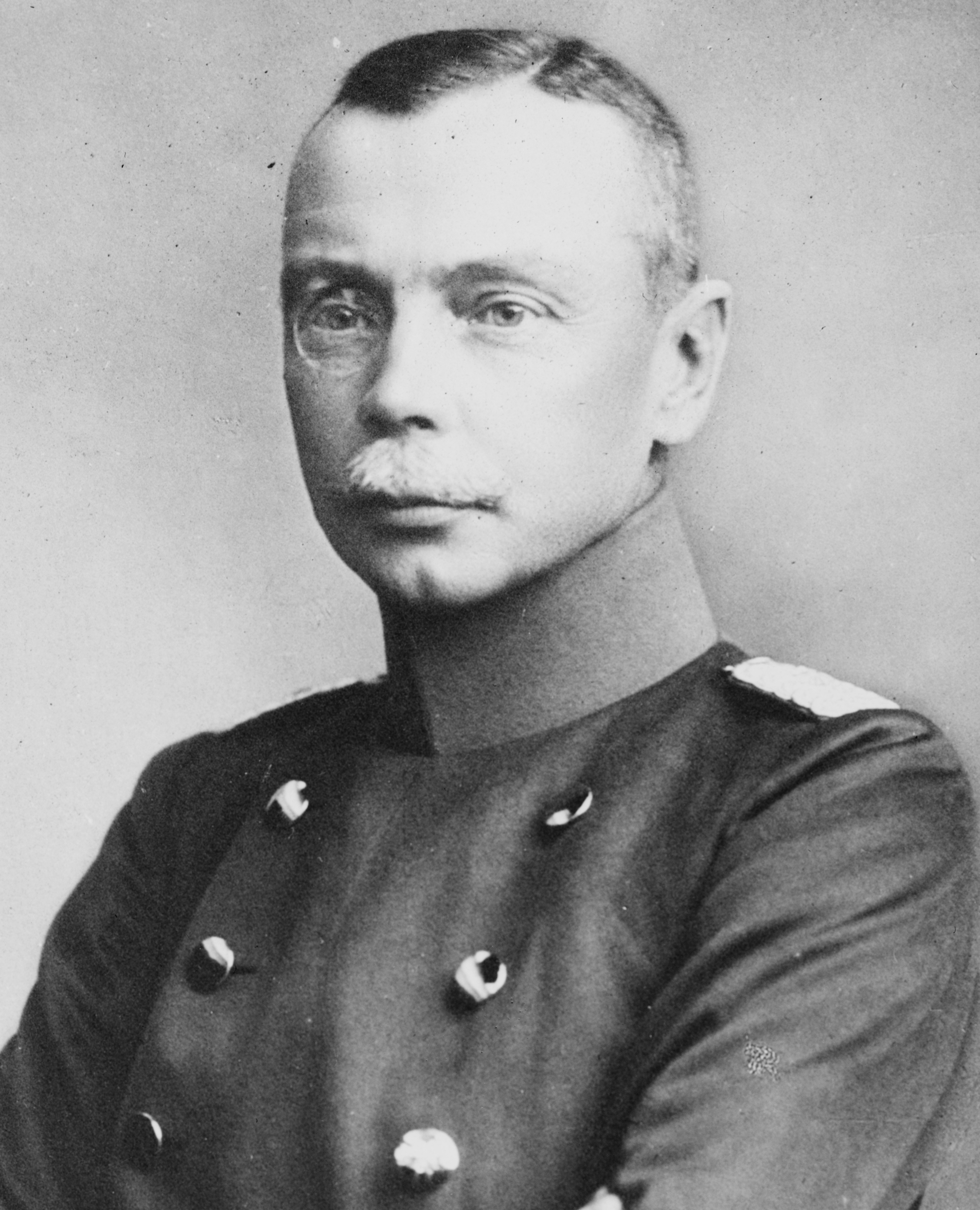

2nd Chief of the German Army Command
- In office 26 March 1920 – 9 October 1926
- President: Friedrich Ebert; Paul von Hindenburg
- Chancellor: Hermann Müller; Constantin Fehrenbach; Joseph Wirth; Wilhelm Cuno; Wilhelm Marx; Hans Luther
- Preceded by: Walther Reinhardt
- Succeeded by: Wilhelm Heye

1st Chief of the German Troop Office
- In office 11 October 1919 – 26 March 1920
- Preceded by: Position established
- Succeeded by: Wilhelm Heye

Chief of the German General Staff
- In office 7 July 1919 – 15 July 1919
- Preceded by: Wilhelm Groener
- Succeeded by: Position abolished (Walther Reinhardt as Chief of the German Army Command)

Personal details
- Born: Johannes Friedrich Leopold von Seeckt; 22 April 1866 Schleswig, Duchy of Schleswig, German Confederation
- Died: 27 December 1936 (aged 70) Berlin, Nazi Germany
- Resting place: Invalidenfriedhof
- Nickname: 'The Sphinx'

Military service
- Allegiance: German Empire; Weimar Republic; Nazi Germany (Note: The flag of Nazi Germany and the war ensign of the German Army shown are the versions used in the Seeckt's years of service, i.e. from 1933 till 1935, when both of these flags were replaced by the new versions: and respectively, based on the swastika flag used by the Nazi Party (see also: Flag of Nazi Germany and Reichskriegsflagge).)
- Branch/service: Imperial German Army; Reichsheer; German Army
- Years of service: 1885–1926; 1933–1935
- Rank: Colonel general (German: Generaloberst)
- Commands: Eleventh Army
- Battles/wars: World War I
- Awards: Pour le Mérite; Military Order of Max Joseph

Johannes "Hans" Friedrich Leopold von Seeckt (22 April 1866 – 27 December 1936) was a German military officer who served as Chief of Staff to August von Mackensen and was a central figure in planning the victories Mackensen achieved for Germany in the east during the First World War.

During the years of the Weimar Republic he was chief of staff for the Reichswehr from 1919 to 1920 and commander in chief of the German Army from 1920 until he resigned in October 1926. (Note: In the following article the words "Reichswehr" and "German army" are used interchangeably, but the official designation of the German Army from 1919 to 1935 was actually the "Reichsheer" ("army of the Reich") and the navy was the "Reichsmarine" which together constituted the "Reichswehr".) During this period he engaged in the reorganization of the army and laid the foundation for the doctrine, tactics, organization, and training of the German army. By the time Seeckt left the German Army in 1926 the Reichswehr had a clear, standardized operational doctrine, as well as a precise theory on the future methods of combat which greatly influenced the military campaigns fought by the Wehrmacht during the first half of the Second World War. While Seeckt undertook multiple programs to get around the military limitations imposed by the Treaty of Versailles which formally ended the state of war between Germany and the Allied Powers after World War I, he has been criticized for failing to expand the reserves of officers and trained men available to the army, the main obstacle to rearmament during the Republic.

Seeckt served as a member of parliament from 1930 to 1932. From 1933 to 1935 he was repeatedly in China as a military consultant to Chiang Kai-shek in his war against the Chinese Communists and was directly responsible for devising the encirclement campaigns, that resulted in a string of victories against the Chinese Red Army and forced Mao Zedong into a 9,000 km (5,600 mi) retreat, also known as the Long March.

A large military barracks in Celle was built in 1935 and named after von Seeckt. After the Second World War it was renamed Trenchard Barracks by BAOR as part of the Bergen-Hohne Garrison.

== Early life ==
Seeckt was born in Schleswig on 22 April 1866 into an old Pomeranian family, that had been ennobled in the eighteenth century. Though the family had lost its estates, Seeckt was "a thorough-going aristocrat", and his father Richard von Seeckt was an important general within the German Army, finishing his career as military governor of Posen. Seeckt followed his father into military service, joining the Army in 1885 at the age of 18. He served in the elite Kaiser Alexander Guard Grenadiers, then joined the Prussian General Staff in 1897. In 1913, Seeckt became the Chief of Staff of the III Corps, based in Berlin.

== First World War ==
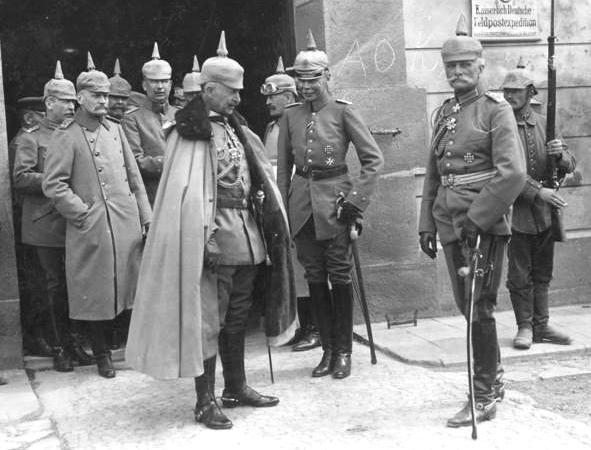
Hans von Seeckt (third from right) next to Wilhelm II (center) and Mackensen (second from right) in 1915

At the outbreak of the First World War, Seeckt held the rank of lieutenant colonel and served as chief of staff for Ewald von Lochow in the German III Corps. On mobilisation, the III Corps was assigned to the 1st Army on the right wing of the forces for the Schlieffen Plan offensive in August 1914 on the Western Front. Early in 1915, after they were attacked by the French near Soissons, Seeckt devised a counterattack that took thousands of prisoners and dozens of guns. He was promoted to colonel on 27 January 1915. In March 1915, he was transferred to the Eastern front to serve as chief of staff to General August von Mackensen of the German 11th Army. He played a major role in the planning and executing of Mackensen's highly successful campaigns.

With the 11th Army, Seeckt helped direct the Gorlice–Tarnów Offensive of 2 May – 27 June 1915, where he was credited with engineering Mackensen's breakthrough which split the two Russian armies opposing them. The Russians never fully recovered. Here Seeckt implemented a change in handling the thrust of the offensive, pushing reserve formations through breaks in the Russian defenses. This was a break from the established method of securing flanks by advancing along a uniform front, using reserve formations to assist in overcoming strong points. By pressing the reserves forward into the Russian rear areas the Russian positions were destabilized, resulting in a collapse of the Russian defensive line. For his contributions he received the Pour le Mérite, Prussia's highest military honor.

In June 1915, Seeckt was promoted to the rank of Generalmajor. He remained chief of staff to Mackensen, who in the fall of 1915 was controlling Army Group Mackensen or Heeresgruppe Mackensen, which included the German 11th Army, the Austro-Hungarian 3rd Army, and the Bulgarian 1st Army, in a renewed campaign in Serbia. As was the case in the Gorlice offensive, Seeckt played a major role in the planning and execution of the operations in Serbia between 6 October and 24 November 1915. The saying spread through the German army "Where Mackensen is, Seeckt is; where Seeckt is, victory is." For his achievements he was awarded the Oak Leaves to the Pour le Mérite. In June 1916 he became chief of staff for the Austro-Hungarian 7th Army in Galicia, which was fighting desperately to stem the Russian general Brusilov's offensive. Next he became chief of staff of the Austro-Hungarian Army Group commanded by Archduke Karl, who later became Emperor, at which point his cousin Archduke Joseph was given command of the Army Group.

In 1917, Seeckt was sent to the Ottoman Empire, a Central Powers ally, to replace Colonel von Schellendorff as Chief of Staff of the Ottoman Army. In choosing Seeckt, Germany was sending a first rate staff officer, but this made little impression on the Turks. The alliance between the Ottoman Empire and Germany was weak. The crumbling Ottoman Empire was enticed to join in the conflict with the promise that a victory would yield them the return of recently lost territories, while Germany hoped the involvement of the Turks would tie down forces of the Entente far from Western Europe. Since the start of the conflict German efforts to influence Ottoman strategy met with limited success. Neither Bronsart nor Seeckt were able to get much consideration for a grand strategy in the Ottoman Empire. Though Enver Pasha would take counsel from the German officers, he would disregard their opinion if it differed from his own. Seeckt wrote that "I... meditate, telegraph, speak, write and calculate in the Turkish service and in Germany's interest".

A common view in the German high command was that internal division in a nation undermines a nation's ability to successfully conduct a military campaign. Seeckt held this view, even to the point of supporting the leadership of the Ottoman Empire as it conducted the genocide of Armenians along its eastern border in 1915. The brutal slaughter met with an outcry from German civilians, churchmen and statesmen. When Seeckt arrived in Turkey two years later he argued such actions were a necessary measure to save Turkey from "internal decay". In a July 1918 message Seeckt replied to inquiries from Berlin by stating "It is an impossible state of affairs to be allied with the Turks and to stand up for the Armenians. In my view, any consideration, Christian, sentimental or political, must be eclipsed by its clear necessity for the war effort." Seeckt also supported the Committee of Union and Progress, a group of army officers who had taken power in Turkey and were attempting to modernize the Ottoman state and society to better support the Ottoman army's effort to win the war.

Following the defeat of the Ottoman Empire in October 1918, Seeckt helped to organize the escape of the Three Pashas and returned to Germany in November 1918. Though the Armistice took effect in November 1918, the British continued to blockade German ports, leading to widespread starvation. Seeckt was initially sent to the east to organize the orderly withdrawal of German troops there. In the spring of 1919 he was sent to represent the German General Staff at the peace conference in Paris. He tried unsuccessfully to persuade the Allies to limit their demands for the disarmament of Germany. Seeckt sought to keep a force of 200,000 men, which was denied. In June 1919 the Germans submitted to the terms of the Treaty of Versailles.

== Development of the Reichswehr ==
=== Reaction to the Treaty of Versailles ===
The Treaty of Versailles greatly restricted the size of the German military and disbanded the General Staff of the Imperial German Army. It also prohibited the German army from using or procuring modern weapons. Seeckt was appointed Chairman of the new Military Committee charged with reorganizing the German army in accordance with the provisions laid down in the Treaty. It fell to Seeckt to build the new Reichswehr within the strict restrictions imposed on the armed forces. He was the last man to serve as Chief of the General Staff and on 11 October 1919, he became the effective chief of the Reichswehr.

In a memo written during 1919, Seeckt expressed anger which was widely held by other German officers over the terms of the Treaty of Versailles. He also remarked that he was against the idea of Germany joining the League of Nations, as the notion of peace being maintained by such an organization was, in his opinion, unlikely. Though in favor of peace in general, he reasoned that war was a recurring state in human history and that the duty of a German officer was to be prepared to fight the next war, if and when that came to pass. Seeckt argued:

My own training in history prevents me from seeing in the idea of permanent peace anything more than a dream whereby it remains an open question whether one can consider it, in Moltke's phrase, a 'good dream' or not.

Seeckt believed that war was inevitable, and that a future Germany would either defend itself or be at the mercy of its neighbors. He worked to ensure the German army maintained the defiant, offensive spirit that was its tradition. Though clear in stating that the Reichswehr was not looking for conflict, he did not believe that men could be stopped from "thinking like men", and argued that one of the primary duties of a German officer was to keep his men and the population at large prepared to defend Germany, saying:

German officers, and especially members of the general staff, have never sought a fight for its own sake or been war-mongers. And they should not do so now. But they should never forget the great deeds achieved by German warriors. Keeping the memory of them alive in ourselves and our people is a sacred duty. For then neither officers nor the people will lapse into enfeebling illusions of peace, but will remain aware that in the moment of truth only personal and national stature counts. If fate once again calls the German people to arms, and who can doubt that day will come, then officers should not have to call on a nation of weaklings, but of strong men ready to take up familiar and trusted weapons. The form these weapons take is not important as long as they are wielded by hands of steel and hearts of iron. So let us do our utmost to ensure that on that future day there is no lack of such hearts and hands. Let us strive tirelessly to strengthen our own bodies and minds and those of our fellow Germans ... It is the duty of every member of the general staff to make the Reichswehr not only a reliable pillar of the state, but also a school for the leaders of the nation. Beyond the army itself, every officer will sow the seed of manly attitudes throughout the population.

The Treaty of Versailles limited the Army to 100,000 men, only 4,000 of whom could be officers. As the commander in chief of the new Reichswehr, Seeckt wanted to ensure that the best officers were retained. The Reichswehr was designed as a cadre force that could be expanded if need be. Officers and NCOs were trained to be able to command at least at the next higher unit level. At the beginning of World War Two suitable NCOs were commissioned, as the NCOs trained by Seeckt were seen as easily suitable to command much larger units. Almost all of the leaders of the Wehrmacht in World War II were men that Seeckt had retained in 1919–20.

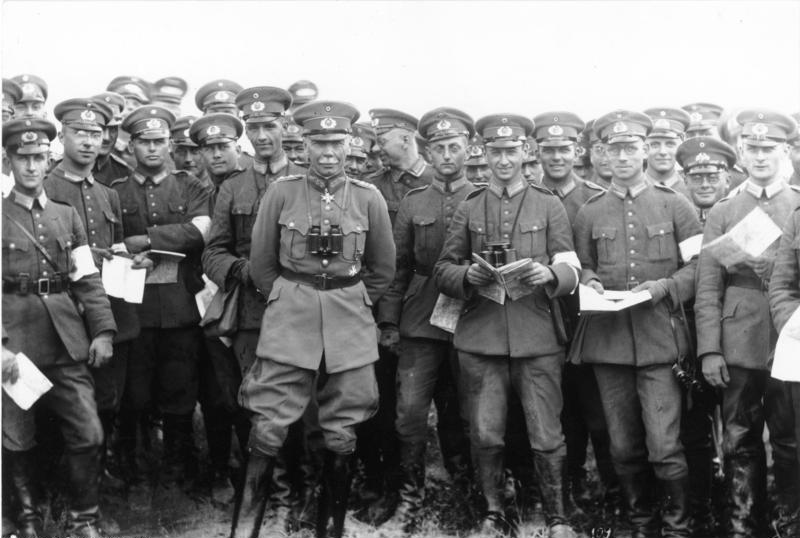
Seeckt with German officers at maneuvers in Thuringia, 1925

Seeckt held conservative political views. He was a monarchist who encouraged the retention of traditional links with the old Imperial Army. To this purpose he designated individual companies and squadrons of the new Reichswehr as the direct successors of particular regiments of Emperor Wilhelm II's army.

=== Views on Jews ===
Seeckt held stereotypical, derogatory views of most Jewish people. In a letter to his wife, herself partially Jewish, on 19 May 1919, Seeckt wrote about the new Prussian Prime Minister, Paul Hirsch:

He is not so bad and is an old parliamentarian. For this post he seems quite unsuitable, especially as a Jew; not only because this is in itself provocative, but because the Jewish talent is purely critical, hence negative and can never help in the construction of a state. This is no good.

Although the Constitution of 1919 prohibited religious discrimination and allowed Jews to become active military officers, the right-wing officer corps of the Reichswehr continued to discriminate against and persecute Jewish candidates.

=== Views on Poland ===
Seeckt saw the Second Polish Republic as the core of the problems in the east, and believed its existence was incompatible with Germany's vital interests. He was in favor of an alliance with the Soviet Union, which along with Germany had also lost territory to Poland. After seeing encouraging signs from the newly established War Commissar's Office of Leon Trotsky, Seeckt sent out his close friend Enver Pasha on a secret mission to Moscow to make contacts with the Soviets. In the summer of 1920, Enver Pasha sent Seeckt a letter from Moscow asking for German arms deliveries to the Soviet Union in exchange for which Trotsky promised to partition Poland with Germany. Seeckt did not hesitate to use military force against attempts by German communists to take power, but his concern over communism did not affect his attitude toward relations with the Soviet Union. Seeckt regarded his informal alliance with the Soviet Union in practical rather than ideological terms. Both nations were weak at the end of the war, and had external threats. In working together, he believed the hand of both nations were strengthened. Seeckt regarded the efforts of General Rüdiger von der Goltz and his Freikorps to create an anti-communist, German-dominated state in the Baltic as a ludicrous attempt to turn back the clock. Seeckt was all for seeing Goltz conquer the Baltic states if that was possible, but he was very antagonistic towards Goltz's efforts to use his proposed state as a basis for overthrowing the Bolsheviks. Seeckt saw Poland as the main enemy and the Soviet Union as a very useful ally against Poland, so he viewed Goltz's anti-Communist schemes with some hostility.

=== Opposition to the Weimar republic and Kapp Putsch ===
After the Allies sent the German government a list of war criminals to be tried, Seeckt called a conference of Staff Officers and departmental heads on 9 February 1920 and said to them that if the German government either outright refused or couldn't successfully reject Allied demands, the Reichswehr would oppose this by all means even if this meant the reopening of hostilities. He further said that if the Allies invaded Germany—which he believed they would not—then the German army in the West should retire behind the Weser and the Elbe, as this was where defensive positions had already been built. In the East, German troops would invade Poland and attempt to establish contacts with the Soviet Union, after which they would both march against France and Britain. He added that German war material would now no longer be sold or destroyed and that the army should be reduced on paper only. An Interior Minister of Prussia, Albert Grzesinski, wrote that members of Seeckt's staff said that Seeckt desired a military dictatorship, perhaps headed by Gustav Noske.

Many in the military refused to accept the democratic Weimar Republic as legitimate due to its agreement with the terms of the Treaty of Versailles. Under the leadership of Seeckt, an effort was made to insulate the Reichswehr from the politics of Germany. Some refer to the Reichswehr as operating as a “state within the state”, meaning it was operating largely outside of the control of the politicians. The heart of Seeckt’s policy was to maintain the power and prestige of the army by avoiding internal dissension. This was most clearly illustrated by Seeckt's role during the Kapp Putsch of March 1920. During the Putsch, Seeckt disobeyed orders from the Defence Minister Gustav Noske, the Chancellor Gustav Bauer and the Reich President Friedrich Ebert to suppress the putsch, claiming "There can be no question of sending the Reichswehr to fight these people". Seeckt's actions were entirely illegal as under the Weimar constitution, the President was the Supreme Commander in Chief, and moreover Seeckt had violated the Reichswehreid oath, which committed the military to defending the republic. Seeckt ordered the military to disregard Ebert's orders to defend the republic, and instead assumed a stance of apparent neutrality, which in effect meant siding with the Kapp putsch by depriving the government of the means of defending itself. Seeckt had no loyalty to the Weimar republic, and his sympathies were entirely with the Kapp putsch, but at the same time, Seeckt regarded the putsch as premature, and chose to sit on the fence to see how things developed rather than committing himself to the putsch. As a result of Seeckt's refusal to defend the government that he had taken a solemn oath to defend, the government was forced to flee Berlin, which was taken by the Marinebrigade Ehrhardt on the morning of 13 March 1920 without a shot being fired.

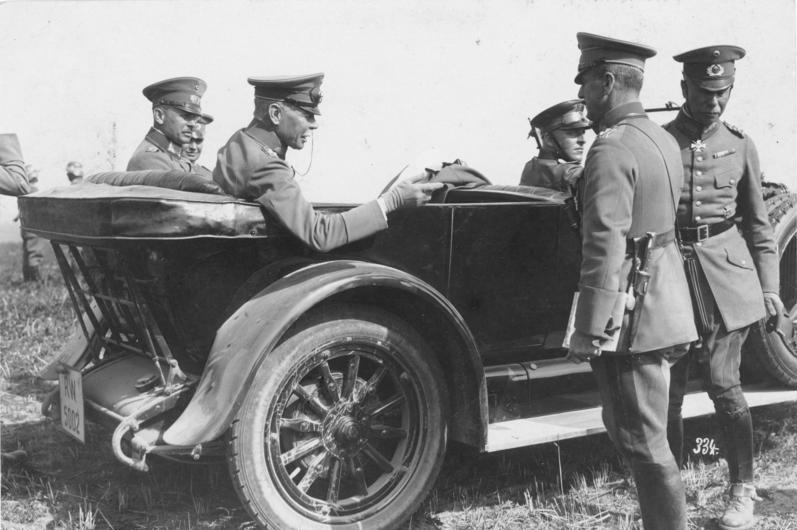
Seeckt during maneuvers in 1926

The putsch failed only after the government called for a general strike, which shut down the German economy. Once it had become clear that the regime established in Berlin under the nominal leadership of Wolfgang Kapp could not function on the account of the general strike, Seeckt sent Colonel Wilhelm Heye to meet with General Walther von Lüttwitz, the real leader of the Kapp putsch, to inform him that it was time to end the putsch". Ludendorff's right-hand man, Colonel Max Bauer asked Seeckt to become dictator; he refused contemptuously.

At the same time, Seeckt showed his sympathy for the putsch by arranging with Captain Hermann Ehrhardt that the Marinebrigade Ehrhardt should march out of Berlin with all the honors of war, during the course of which march the men of the Marinebrigade Ehrhardt fired on jeering Berliners, killing a number of them. Only those few officers and soldiers who had attempted to defend the republic were dismissed. The officers led by Seeckt who had done nothing to defend the republic were allowed to continue with their jobs. Seeckt's remark to the leaders of the republic, that "Reichswehr do not fire on Reichswehr", was controversial. His reserved attitude towards the Weimar Republic is illustrated by a brief conversation held with President Ebert. When asked by Ebert where the Reichswehr stood, Seeckt answered "The Reichswehr stands behind me", and on being asked whether the Reichswehr was reliable, Seeckt answered: "I don't know if it is reliable, but it obeys my orders!"

=== Attempts to circumvent Versailles ===
From 1920 to 1926 Seeckt held the position of Chef der Heeresleitung—in fact if not in name commander of the army of the new Weimar Republic, the Reichswehr. In working to build a professional army within and without the confines of the Treaty of Versailles, Seeckt advanced the concept of the army as a "state-within-a-state". This matched the conditions of the Versailles Treaty which were aimed at creating a long-term professional army with a ceiling of 100,000 volunteers and without significant reserves - a force which would not be able to challenge the much larger French Army.

In 1921 Seeckt founded the Arbeitskommandos (Work Commandos) commanded by Major Bruno Ernst Buchrucker, which was a command of soldiers thinly disguised as a labour group intended to assist with civilian projects, whereas its actual purpose was to provide a way for the Reichswehr to circumvent the restriction in the Treaty of Versailles which limited Germany's army to 100,000 men. The control of the Arbeirakommandos was exercised through a group comprising Fedor von Bock, Kurt von Schleicher, Eugen Ott and Kurt von Hammerstein-Equord. What came to be known as the Black Reichswehr" became infamous for its practice of using Feme murders to punish "traitors" who, for example, revealed the locations of weapons' stockpiles or names of members. During the trials of some of those charged with the murders, prosecutors alleged that the killings were ordered by the officers from Bock's group. The journalist Carl von Ossietzky wrote: "... [the accused] did nothing but carry out the orders given him, and that certainly Colonel von Bock, and probably Colonel von Schleicher and General Seeckt, should be sitting in the dock beside him."

Several times Bock and his officers denied in court that the Reichswehr ministry had had any knowledge the "Black Reichswehr" or the murders they had committed. In a secret letter sent to the President of the German Supreme Court, which was trying a member of the Black Reichswehr for murder, Seeckt admitted that the Black Reichswehr was controlled by the Reichswehr, and argued that the murders were justified by the struggle against Versailles, so the court should acquit the defendant.

=== Russian and French concerns ===
In 1921, Seeckt had Kurt von Schleicher of Sondergruppe R negotiate the arrangements with Leonid Krasin for German aid to the Soviet arms industry. In September 1921, at a secret meeting in Schleicher's apartment, the details of an arrangement for German financial and technological aid for building up the Soviet arms industry in exchange for Soviet support in helping Germany evade the disarmament clauses of the Treaty of Versailles were agreed to. Schleicher created a shell corporation known as the GEFU (Gesellschaft zur Förderung gewerblicher Unternehmungen-Company for the promotion of industrial enterprise) that funneled 75 million Reichsmark into the Soviet arms industry. The GEFU founded factories in the Soviet Union for the production of aircraft, tanks, artillery shells and poison gas. The arms contracts of GEFU in the Soviet Union ensured that Germany did not fall behind in military technology in the 1920s despite being disarmed by Versailles, and laid the covert foundations in the 1920s for the overt rearmament of the 1930s.

Seeckt saw France, with its large continental army, as the main threat to Germany, and the opponent in a future war. He saw Poland as a vassal state of France. He advocated strengthening Germany by whatever means were available, including reaching out to the Soviet Union. He believed the United Kingdom would eventually be compelled to fight a war against its historic enemy, France, and that when such an event occurred the United Kingdom would be looking for an ally on the continent to carry the burden of a land war. He felt a strong Germany would be a more attractive ally than a weak one. The support between Germany and the Soviets was seen in this light, as an agreement that would add to the strength of both nations. He did not believe such an agreement would alienate the United Kingdom. Though Seeckt was strongly anti-communist and was committed to keeping communism from Germany, that did not mean he would not make deals with the Soviet Union that would help Germany's position in the world.

Seeckt's policies caused tension with the former Foreign Minister Count Ulrich von Brockdorff-Rantzau, who was to be sent out as the Ambassador to Moscow. Brockdorff-Rantzau was just as committed as Seeckt to the destruction of Versailles, but rather preferred to accomplish that goal through an alliance with Britain. Moreover, Brockdorff-Rantzau feared that a too close rapprochement with the Soviet Union would alienate Britain and drive her into the arms of France. In response, on 11 September 1922, Seeckt sent a memo to Brockdorff-Rantzau entitled "Germany's Attitude to the Russian Problem". Some of Seeckt's salient points were:

Germany must pursue a policy of action. Every State must do that. The moment it stops pursuing a forward policy it ceases to be a State. An active policy must have a goal and a driving force. For carrying it out it is essential to assess one's own strength correctly and at the same time understand the methods and aims of the other powers.

The man who bases his political ideas on the weakness of his own country, who sees only dangers, or whose only desire is to remain stationary, is not pursuing a policy at all, and should be kept far away from the scene of activity.

The years 1814/15 saw France in complete military and political collapse, yet no one at the Congress of Vienna followed a more active policy than Talleyrand — to France's advantage. Has the world ever seen a greater catastrophe than that suffered by Russia in the last war? Yet with what vigor the Soviet Government recovered, both at home and abroad! Did not the Sick Man of Europe seem to be dead once more and for all, and buried by the Treaty of Sèvres? Yet today, after the victory over Greece, he stands up to England with confidence. He followed an active Turkish policy.

Have not Germany's first stirrings in active politics, the Treaty of Rapallo, clearly brought her at last nearer to being more respected?

This treaty splits opinion into different camps when the Russian problem is considered. The main point about it is not its economic value, though that is by no means inconsiderable, but its political achievement. This association between Germany and Russia is the first and almost the only increase in power which we have so far obtained since peace was made. That this association should begin in the field of economics is a natural consequence of the general situation, but its strength lies in the fact that this economic rapprochement is preparing the way for the possibility of a political and, thus also, a military association. It is beyond a doubt that such a double association would strengthen Germany-and also Russia … The whole policy of reconciliation and appeasement towards France — no matter whether it is pursued by a Stinnes or by General Ludendorff — is hopeless as it aims at political success. The question of orientation towards the West, as far as France is concerned is ruled out …

England is drifting towards another historic conflict with France, even through she does not face imminent war. That lurks in the background. A glance at the East is surely sufficient even for those who before Genoa did not wish to use their eyes and ears. The British interests in the Dardanelles, Egypt and India are certainly infinitely more important at the moment than those on the Rhine, and an understanding between Britain and France at Germany's expense, that is, a concession by Britain in return for an immediate advantage, is by no means improbable. Yet even such an understanding would be only temporary. The moment is coming, and must come, when Britain will be looking for allies on the Continent. When that moment arrives she will prefer the mercenary who is growing in strength, and will even have to make him stronger.

A rapprochement between Germany and Russia would not have a decisive influence on Britain's attitude either in making a concession to France or in searching for an ally. British policy is ruled by other more compelling motives than anxiety about some far-distant threat from a Russia made strong with the help of Germany...

With Poland we come now to the core of the Eastern problem. The existence of Poland is intolerable and incompatible with Germany's vital interests. She must disappear and will do so through her own inner weakness and through Russia — with our help. Poland is more intolerable for Russia than for ourselves; Russia can never tolerate Poland. With Poland collapses one of the strongest pillars of the Peace of Versailles, France's advance post of power [is lost]. The attainment of this objective must be one of the firmest guiding principles of German policy, as it is capable of achievement — but only through Russia or with her help.

Poland can never offer Germany any advantage, either economically, because she is incapable of development, or politically, because she is a vassal state of France. The restoration of the frontier between Russia and Germany is a necessary condition before both sides can become strong. The 1914 frontier between Russia and Germany should be the basis of any understanding between the two countries ...

I will touch one or two more objections to the policy demanded towards Russia. Germany today is certainly not in a position to resist France. Our policy should be to prepare the means of doing so in the future. A French advance through Germany to go to the help of Poland would make nonsense from the military point of view, so long as Germany does not voluntarily co-operate. The idea springs from the notions of our 1919 diplomats, and there have been three years of work since then. War on the Rhine between France and Russia is a political bogy. Germany will not be Bolshevized, even by an understanding with Russia on external matters.

The German nation, with its Socialist majority, would be averse to a policy of action, which has to reckon with the possibility of war. It must be admitted that the spirit surrounding the Peace Delegation at Versailles has not yet disappeared, and that stupid cry of 'No more war!' is widely echoed. It is echoed by many bourgeois-pacifist elements, but among the workers, and also among the members of the official Social Democratic Party there are many who are not prepared to eat out of the hands of France and Poland. It is true that there is a widespread and understandable need for peace among the German people. The clearest heads, when considering the pros and cons of war, will be those of the military, but to pursue a policy means to take a lead. In spite of everything, the German people will follow the leader in the struggle for their existence. Our task is to prepare for this struggle, for we shall not be spared it.

Seeckt's memo won Brockdorff-Rantzau over to his policy.

=== Meeting Hitler and strengthening Germany ===
Seeckt was concerned with strengthening Germany, and after meeting Adolf Hitler for the first time on 11 March 1923 he wrote: "We were one in our aim; only our paths were different". Seeckt was not fully aware of what Hitler's aims might be. He soon found he had to oppose a number of insurgencies, including the Hitler-Ludendorff-Putsch. Seeckt was aware that the purpose of the insurgencies was to overthrow the government that had accepted the terms of the Treaty and to start a war against France, but he reasoned the result would have led to the destruction of Germany's small forces and a French occupation of German territory. On the night of 29–30 September 1923, the Black Reichswehr under the leadership of Major Buchrucker attempted a putsch. Seeckt was prompt in his response, ordering the Reichswehr to crush Buchrucker's putsch by laying siege to the forts he had seized outside of Berlin. After two days, Buchrucker surrendered. Two months later Seeckt put down Hitler's Putsch on 8–9 November 1923, insisting that the Bavarian Division of the Reichswehr remain loyal to the state. British historian John Wheeler-Bennett wrote that Seeckt was loyal to the Reich, not the Republic and ideologically Seeckt sympathized with Erich Ludendorff, Buchrucker and Hitler. Seeckt was only opposed to the Munich Beer Hall putsch and Buchrucker's putsch because the stated aim of the Nazis and the Black Reichswehr putschists was to reject the peaceful settlement of the Ruhrkampf that had been agreed to in September and instead go to war with France in 1923. Seeckt, knowing the most probable outcome of such war, preferred that the Weimar Republic stay in existence, at least for the moment when painful compromises were necessary. Seeckt strongly opposed the Locarno Treaties which he viewed as appeasement of France and was skeptical of German membership of the League of Nations because he believed it was compromising Germany's connections with the Soviet Union. In particular, Seeckt objected to joining the League as one of the conditions for League membership was the commitment not to engage in aggression against other League members, something that put something of a damper on Seeckt's plans for aggression against Poland. In a 1925 memo, Seeckt stated: "We must become powerful, and as soon as we have power, we will naturally take back everything we have lost"

=== Training and reserves ===
Seeckt made the training standards of the Reichswehr the toughest in the world. He trained them in anti-air and anti-tank fighting by creating wooden weapons and staging mock battles under the guise of training the soldiers for reintroduction into civilian life. Seeckt's discipline of this small army was quite different from that of past German armies. For instance, rather than the harsh punishments of the Imperial Army, minor offenders were forced to spend off-hour duties lying under a bed and singing old Lutheran hymns. To make the training appear less military, photographs were published of recruits being taught topics like horse anatomy and beekeeping.

While Seeckt ran multiple schemes to increase the number of reserves these proved largely ineffective. Officers were encouraged to leave regular units and join the reserve. Apart from the labour corps there also were the border guard units from the Grenzschutz, which was created in 1921, mostly guarding Germany's eastern border, these were equipped with small arms as well as machine guns and received military training. The security units of the Schutzpolizei turned out to be the most effective at procuring trained manpower. They were led by former NCOs and officers and were equipped with small arms and armoured cars and given basic military training. During the 1920 the Grenzschutz possessed 40,000 and the Schutzpolizei at most 70,000 men. The at most 110,000 strong reserves were much smaller than those the German empire had possessed. As a result when the Wehrmacht went to war in WWII, it had only four classes of officer compared to the 40 of the German imperial army. This was partially because the German officers, including Seeckt, had had a disdain for a levee en masse style organisation, originally stemming from Von Roon's ideas on war.

=== Resignation ===
He was forced to resign on 9 October 1926 because he had invited Prince Wilhelm, the grandson of the former emperor to attend army manoeuvres in the uniform of the old imperial First Foot Guards without first seeking government approval. It created a storm when the republican press publicized the transgression. Reichswehr Minister Otto Gessler told President von Hindenburg that Seeckt must resign or he would have to resign himself. He was supported by the cabinet, so Hindenburg asked for Seeckt's resignation. In a painful final interview with Seeckt, Hindenburg emphasized that he had to go to keep the government from resigning, not because of his invitation to the prince.

=== Roots of the Wehrmacht ===
The army that Germany went to war with in 1939 was largely Seeckt's creation. The tactics and operational concepts of the Wehrmacht were the work of Seeckt in the 1920s. In addition, the majority of the senior officers and many of the middle-ranking officers were men that Seeckt had chosen to retain in the Reichswehr. Seeckt created 57 different committees to study the last war to provide lessons learned for the next war. Seeckt stated: "It is absolutely necessary to put the experience of the war in a broad light and collect this experience while the impressions won on the battlefield are still fresh and a major portion of the experienced officers are still in leading positions". The result was the 1921 book Leadership and Battle with Combined Arms that outlined the combined arms tactics and operational ideas that went on to serve as the Wehrmacht's doctrine in the Second World War. Seeckt envisioned Germany winning the next war by a series of highly mobile operations featuring combined arms operations of artillery, infantry, armor, and air power working together to concentrate superior firepower to crush the enemy at crucial points. Seeing a significant role for air power in the next war, Seeckt kept a large number of officers in the Reichswehr who had experience in air combat. These officers formed the future officers corps of the Luftwaffe in the 1930s.

== Chinese Mission and Death ==
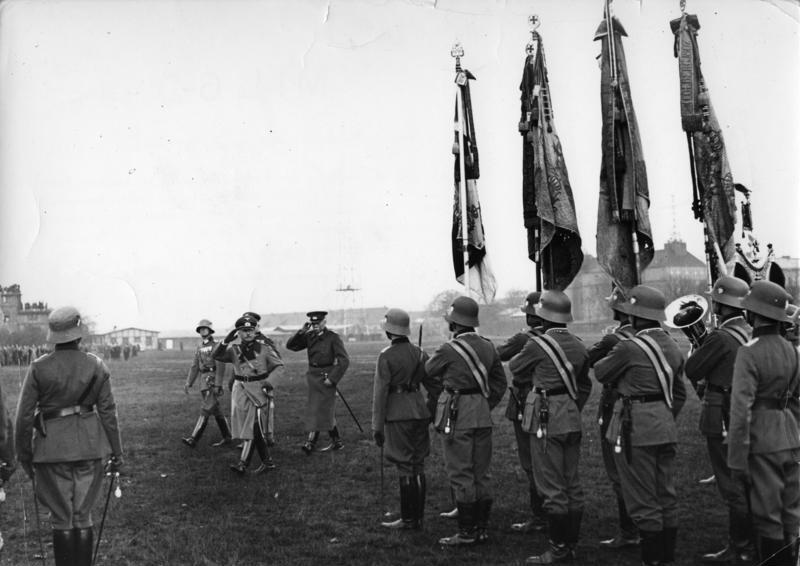
Seeckt reviewing troops with the Chief of Staff, Fritsch.

After failing to gain a seat as a candidate for the Centre Party, Seeckt was elected to the Reichstag as a member of the DVP, serving from 1930 through 1932. In October 1931, Seeckt was a featured speaker at a rally at Bad Harzburg which led to the founding of the Harzburg Front. In the presidential election of 1932 he wrote to his sister, urging her to vote for Hitler. From 1933–1935 he served as an adviser to Chiang Kai-shek and helped to establish a new basis for Sino-German cooperation until 1941. In October 1933, Seeckt arrived in China to head the German military mission. At the time of his arrival, Sino-German relations were in a bad state owing to the racial arrogance of the Germans, and Chiang was considering firing the Germans and bringing in a French military mission. In order to save the military mission, Seeckt ordered the German officers to behave with more tact towards the Chinese and to start showing some respect for Chinese sensibilities. In this way, Seeckt saved Germany's position in China.

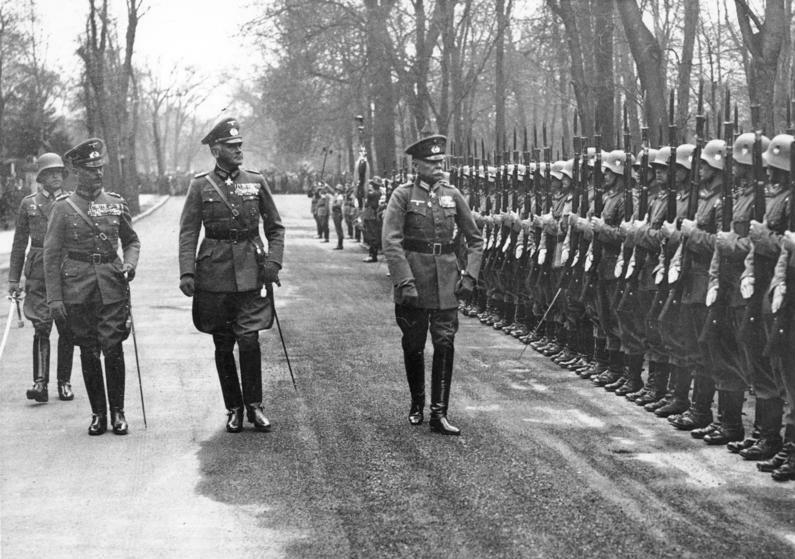
Seeckt with a guard of honor on the occasion of his 70th birthday, with Blomberg (center) and Rundstedt (left), April 1936.

Seeckt advised Chiang that China would need 60 divisions to form an army, which he proposed to arm with modern weapons and train in the combined arms operations which he had previously used in training the German Army in the 1920s. Seeckt stressed he would need the best Chinese officers to train in modern warfare. His goal was to make the National Revolutionary Army like the army in Germany after the war, a force which could make up for what it lacked in quantity with its high quality of professional soldiers. In addition, Seeckt stressed he wanted an end to regionalism in the Chinese military. The army was to be led by officers who were loyal to Chiang alone, with no regional loyalties.

In addition, Seeckt urged Chiang to fortify the lower Yangtze valley, and to adopt policies to industrialize China to gain independence from Western manufacturing. To this end, Seeckt suggested a trade agreement between China and Germany, where Germany would receive minerals needed for weapon manufacture, especially tungsten, and China would be provided with weapons and the industrial machinery needed to make China self-sufficient in producing such weapons. In March 1934, Chiang not only appointed Seeckt as his Chief Military Advisor, but also appointed him as the Deputy Chairman of the Military Affairs Council. In that capacity Seeckt chaired the twice weekly meetings at Nanjing between Chiang and his most senior generals. At a meeting at Mount Lu in 1934, Seeckt's plan for 60 divisions was adopted. To create that army, a 10-year plan was adopted. The officers trained by Seeckt were important later in the Chinese resistance to the Japanese invasion of China.

In early 1934, Seeckt advised Chiang that to defeat the Chinese Communists he needed to employ a scorched earth policy, which required building a series of lines and forts around areas controlled by the Communists in the Jiangxi Soviet in order to force the Communist guerrillas to fight in the open, where the superior firepower of the Nationalists would give them an advantage. Following Seeckt's advice, in the spring and summer of 1934 the Kuomintang built three thousand "turtle shell" forts linked by a series of roads while at the same time pursuing a scorched earth policy around the forts as part of the Fifth Bandit Extermination Campaign in Jiangxi. It was Seeckt's tactics that led to a series of defeats suffered by the Chinese Communists that in October 1934 led to the infamous Long March.

Despite Seeckt's role in putting down the Beer Hall Putsch, Hitler congratulated Seeckt on his 70th birthday and named the Sixty-seventh Infantry Regiment after him.

Seeckt died suddenly in Berlin on 27 December 1936, after a short illness. Hitler sent personal condolences to Seeckt's widow Dorothea, who was partially Jewish. Seeckt was given a state funeral which was attended by Hitler, chiefs of the newly established Wehrmacht, Nazi civil leadership and the former Tsar of Bulgaria Ferdinand I. He was buried at Invalidenfriedhof.

== Bibliography ==
- The future of the German empire: criticisms and postulates (New York: E. P. Dutton, 1930)
- Gedanken eines Soldaten ("Thoughts of a Soldier") (Berlin: Verlag für Kulturpolitik, 1929)

== Decorations and awards ==
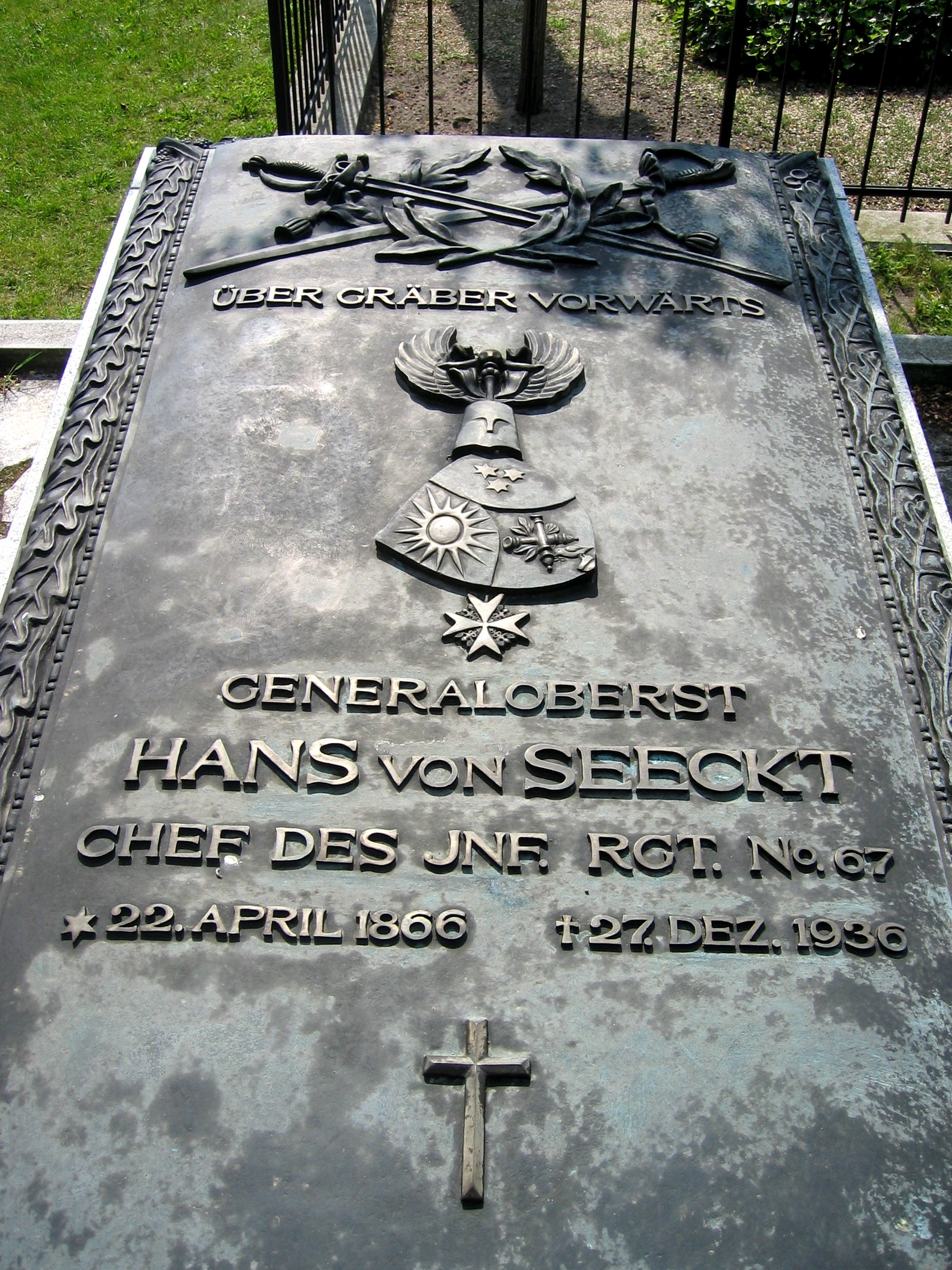
Seeckt's grave at Invalidenfriedhof, Berlin

- Iron Cross (1914), 1st and 2nd class
- Pour le Mérite with oak leaves
- Order of the Red Eagle, 4th class with crown
- Order of the Crown, 3rd class (Prussia)
- Prussian Service Cross Award
- Commander of the Military Order of Max Joseph
- Military Merit Order, 2nd class (Bavaria)
- Knight's Cross of the Albert Order, 2nd class with Swords
- Commander of the Order of the Crown (Württemberg)
- Hesse Bravery Medal
- Hanseatic Cross of Hamburg
- Military Merit Cross, 1st class (Mecklenburg-Schwerin)
- Friedrich August Cross, 1st class
- Commander, First Class of the Ducal Saxe-Ernestine House Order with Swords
- Commander of the Order of Saint Stephen of Hungary
- Order of Leopold, 1st class (Austria)
- Order of the Iron Crown, 1st class with War Decoration
- Military Merit Cross, 2nd class with War Decoration (Austria-Hungary)
- Star of the Decoration for Services to the Red Cross
- Gold Imtiyaz Medal (Ottoman Empire)
- Order of Osmanieh, 1st class with swords (Ottoman Empire)
- Order of the Medjidie, 1st class with swords (Ottoman Empire)
- Gallipoli Star (Ottoman Empire) ("Iron Crescent", Ottoman Empire)
- Order of Bravery, 2nd class (Bulgaria)
- Grand Cross of the Order of Military Merit (Bulgaria)

== See also ==
- Sino-German cooperation until 1941

Military offices
Preceded by Wilhelm Groener	Chief of the Troop Office; 1919–1920	Succeeded by Wilhelm Heye
