= Küstrin Putsch =

Attempted coup in Germany on 1 October 1923

- Part of political violence in Germany (1918–33)
Date	1 October 1923
Location	Küstrin, Germany
Result	German government victory: Putsch failure

Belligerents
Black Reichswehr	Weimar Republic: Reichswehr

Commanders and leaders
Bruno Ernst Buchrucker (surrendered)	

Casualties and losses
1 killed 7 wounded	None

The Küstrin Putsch of 1 October 1923, also known as the Buchrucker Putsch after its leader, was a coup attempt against the Weimar Republic by units of the paramilitary Black Reichswehr under Bruno Ernst Buchrucker. It was launched in response to nationalist anger over the government's decision to end passive resistance against the French and Belgian occupation of the Ruhr. It failed both in Berlin and in the eastern German town of Küstrin when the colonel in charge of the Küstrin Fortress detained Buchrucker and called in the Reichswehr. Buchrucker was convicted of treason and sentenced to prison but was amnestied after serving four years of the ten-year sentence.

== Background ==
Groups from the Black Reichswehr called labor commandos (Arbeitskommando) led by Bruno Ernst Buchrucker wanted to bring down the Reich government of Chancellor Gustav Stresemann and replace the parliamentary democratic republic with a national dictatorship. The putsch was prompted when on 26 September 1923 the government ended passive resistance to the French and Belgian occupation of the Ruhr that had begun in January 1923 after Germany defaulted on the war reparations payments required by the Treaty of Versailles. Buchrucker was reacting to an arrest warrant issued against him for recruiting additional labor commandos without authorization. The commandos were officially civilian volunteers tasked with finding and collecting weapons caches, but in reality they were troops being trained under the Reichswehr in violation of the 100,000 man limit on the German army imposed by the Treaty of Versailles.

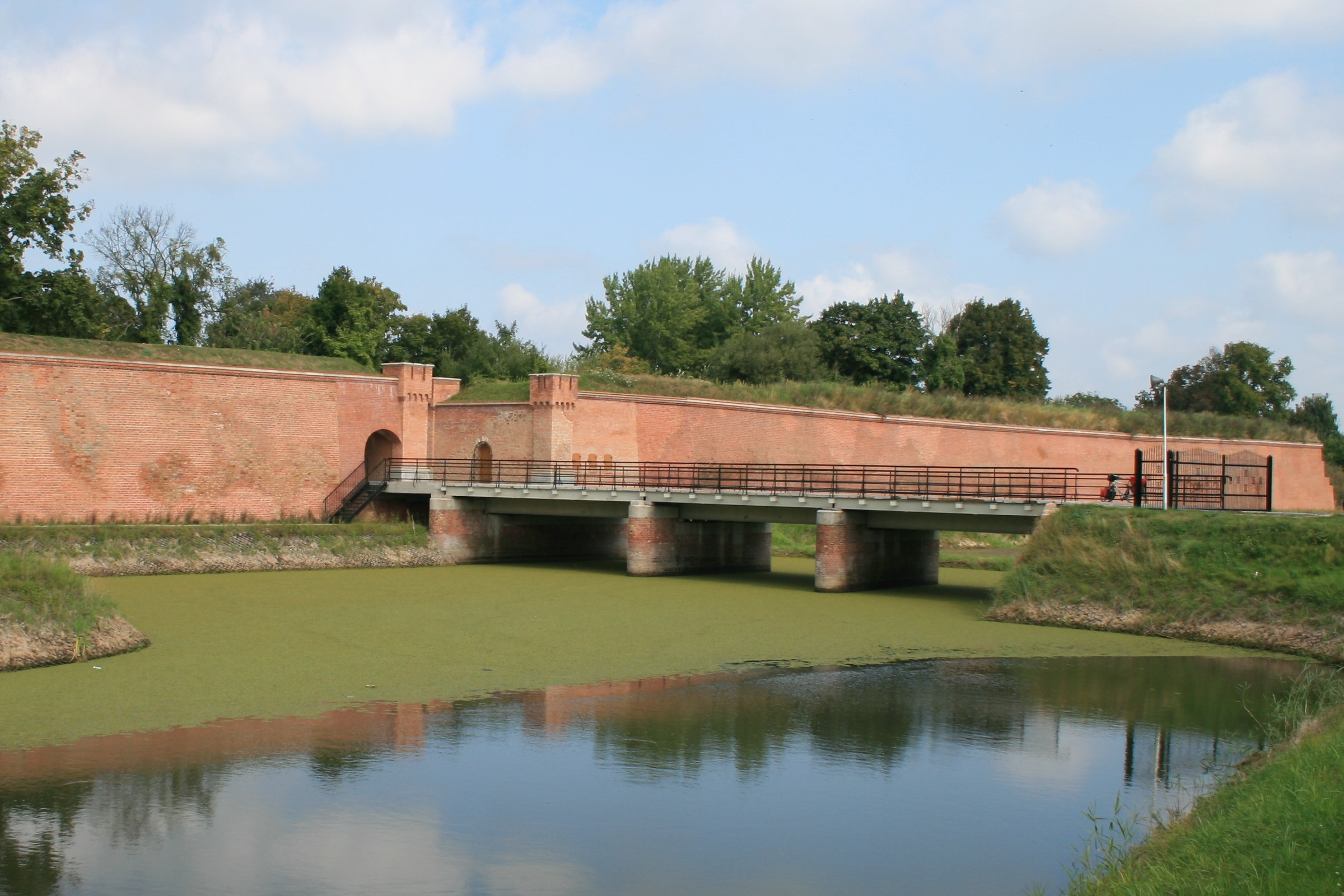
Modern view of the Küstrin Fortress, where Buchrucker's men assembled for the coup attempt

Buchrucker learned about the arrest warrant issued against him on 30 September in Berlin and drove to Küstrin (since 1945 Kostrzyn nad Odrą, Poland), about 320 km to the southeast. There he ordered the leader of the city's labor commandos, Major Fritz Hertzer, to have his men move inside the fortifications of the Old Town the following morning. He gave as his reason the arrest warrant against him and said that he was seeking the labor commandos' help and protection. The next morning he planned to contact the local commander of the Reichswehr to have him inform the Reichswehr minister of the threatening situation in Küstrin. Buchrucker hoped that would get the arrest warrant lifted.

== The attempt ==
The next morning Buchrucker delivered a reportedly nearly incoherent speech to the men assembled in the Küstrin Fortress. He and Hertzer went to the fortress commander, Colonel Gudowius, explained the situation to him and were immediately told that they were under arrest. Buchrucker pointed out his units' numerical superiority and asked the commander "not to stand in his way, the great national moment has now come". He also declared that he would strike out "not only here in Küstrin but everywhere at the same time". The colonel told him again that he was under arrest and telephoned Reichswehr units in Küstrin and Frankfurt-an-der-Oder for support. Several sergeants loyal to Buchrucker then forcibly entered the colonel's office. Asked by his subordinates for instructions, Buchrucker was unable to come to a decision on what to do. Hertzer, calling Buchrucker a "'limp dishrag", then put himself under Gudowius' command.

Hertzer ordered the rest of the labor commandos in the fortress to stand down and said that they had all been lied to and betrayed by Buchrucker. Later that day, the Reichswehr reinforcements from Frankfurt-an-der-Oder, who on their way had by chance met a group of labor commandos also going to Küstrin, arrived there together. When the commandos were getting out of their truck, the Reichswehr opened fire on them with a machine gun, killing one and wounding seven. They were the putsch's only casualties. 381 Black Reichswehr labor commandos were arrested but released a short time later. All of the officers involved remained under arrest.

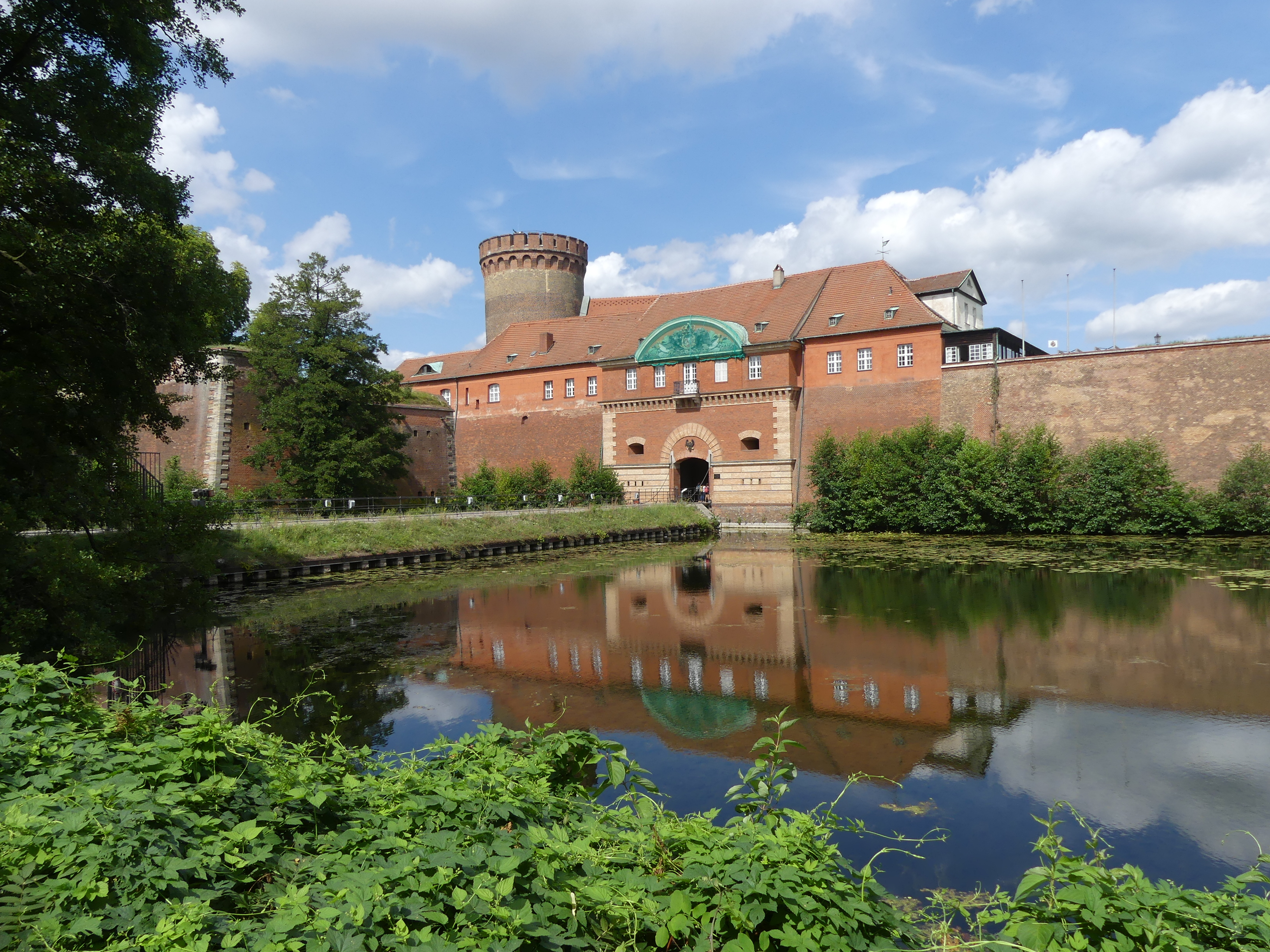
The Spandau Citadel in Berlin, center of the Berlin part of the putsch.

In Berlin, putschists from the labor commandos briefly controlled the Spandau Citadel and Fort Hahneberg but were forced to surrender to the Reichswehr. A similar situation in Rathenow, west of Berlin, was defused on 3 October.

== Aftermath ==
Between 22 and 27 October 1923, the trial of 14 people arrested in Küstrin took place before an extraordinary court in Cottbus. It was held without the public present for fear of endangering public order. Buchrucker declared in court that he had wanted only to put pressure on the Reichswehr minister to withdraw the arrest warrant. That was in the interests of the state, he said, because there were "daredevils" in the ranks of the labor commandos from whom violence was to be feared if he was arrested. The court did not accept his account. According to its judgment there were sufficient indications that "the events in Küstrin were in fact only part of a larger-scale undertaking". Buchrucker's hour-long period of indecision on what to do was taken to mean that he had serious decisions to make. The court also thought that Buchrucker assumed that the Reichswehr would join him or remain neutral. He was sentenced to ten years imprisonment and a fine of ten gold marks for perpetrating high treason but was given amnesty in October 1927 on the occasion of President Paul von Hindenburg's birthday. Nine of the other 14 men tried were convicted, with seven of them receiving prison sentences of less than 6 months.

In response to the putsch, General Hans von Seeckt dissolved the Black Reichswehr. Some of its members, especially officers, went to Bavaria and joined the Nazi Party.

== See also ==
- Beer Hall Putsch
- Kapp Putsch
