= Christian communism =

Form of communism based on the life and teachings of Jesus Christ

Christian communism is a form of communism based on the teachings of the Christian Bible and the life and ministry of Jesus. It is the theological view that the teachings of Jesus compel Christians to support religious communism. There is no universal agreement on the exact dates when communistic ideas and practices in Christianity began, although many Christian communists argue that evidence from the Bible suggests that the first Christians, including the Apostles, established their own small communist society in the years following Jesus' death and resurrection. Many advocates of Christian communism and other communists, including Karl Kautsky, argue that it was taught by Jesus and practised by the apostles themselves. This position is also supported by some historians studying early Christianity.

Some scholars view the early Christian Church, as described in the Acts of the Apostles, as an early form of communism or Christian socialism. They believe that communism was Christianity in practice and that Jesus was the first communist.

== History ==
Christian communism was based on the concept of koinonia, which means common or shared life, which was not an economic doctrine but an expression of agape love. It involved the voluntary sharing of goods amongst the community. Acts 4:35 records that in the early Christian Church in Jerusalem "[n]o one claimed that any of their possessions was their own, but shared everything in common." The pattern helped the early Christians to survive after the siege of Jerusalem and was taken seriously for several centuries. While it later disappeared from church history, it remained within monasticism and was an important supporting factor in the rise of feudalism. This ideal returned in the 19th century with monasticism revival and the rise of religious movements wanting to revive the early Christian egalitarianism. Because they were accused of atheism due its association with Marxism, they preferred communalism to describe their Christian communism.

=== Church Fathers ===
Christ Driving the Money Changers from the Temple by El Greco

The early Church Fathers, like their non-Abrahamic religious predecessors, maintained that human society had declined to its current state from a now lost egalitarian social order. Several historians view the early Christian Church, as described in the Acts of the Apostles (specifically the omnia sunt communia reference in Acts 2:44-45 and Acts 4:32-35), as an early form of communism. Among Christian communists, the view is that communism was just Christianity in practice and Jesus was a communist. Later historians across several centuries supported the reading of early church communities as communistic in structure.

=== European High Middle Ages ===
From the High Middle Ages in Europe, various groups supported Christian communist and rural communalist ideas, and these ideas were also occasionally adopted by reformist Christian sects. An early 12th-century proto-Protestant group originating in Lyon known as the Waldensians held their property in common in accordance with the Book of Acts but were persecuted by the Catholic Church and retreated to Piedmont.

Around 1300, the Apostolic Brethren in northern Italy were taken over by Fra Dolcino, who formed a sect known as the Dulcinians, which advocated ending feudalism, dissolving hierarchies in the church, and holding all property in common. The Peasants' Revolt in England has been an inspiration for "the medieval ideal of primitive communism", with the priest John Ball of the revolt being an inspirational figure to later revolutionaries, and having allegedly declared that "things cannot go well in England, nor ever will, until all goods are held in common."

=== Renaissance ===
Around the year 1420, a radical Hussite faction in Bohemia known as the Taborites established themselves in Tábor. The group sought to live a life similar to that of the early Church. All possessions were held in common, they declared the rejection of their king, and the ruling lord. Additionally, they declared equality among both men and women. This resulted in women receiving education for the first time. Ultimately, the encampment lasted until 1437.

In the 16th century, English writer Thomas More, who is venerated in the Catholic Church as a saint, portrayed a society based on common ownership of property in his treatise Utopia, whose leaders administered it through the application of reason.

=== Reformation and early modernity ===
Several groupings in the English Civil War supported Christian communism, especially Gerrard Winstanley's Diggers, who espoused clear communistic and agrarianist ideals. Oliver Cromwell and the Grandees' attitude to these groups was at best ambivalent and often hostile. Thomas Müntzer led a large Anabaptist communist movement during the 16th-century German Peasants' War, which Friedrich Engels analysed in The Peasant War in Germany.

The Hutterites believed in strict adherence to biblical principles and church discipline, and practised a form of communism. In the words of historians Max Stanton and Rod Janzen, the Hutterites "established in their communities a rigorous system of Ordnungen, which were codes of rules and regulations that governed all aspects of life and ensured a unified perspective. As an economic system, Christian communism was attractive to many of the peasants who supported social revolution in sixteenth century central Europe", such as the German Peasants' War, and Engels came to view Anabaptists as proto-communists.

=== Beginning of the Age of Enlightenment ===
Criticism of the idea of private property continued into the Enlightenment era of the 18th century through such thinkers as the deeply religious Jean-Jacques Rousseau. Raised a Calvinist, Rousseau was influenced by the Jansenist movement within the Catholic Church. The Jansenist movement originated from the most orthodox Catholic bishops who tried to reform the Catholic Church in the 17th century to stop secularization and Protestantism. One of the main Jansenist aims was democratizing to stop the aristocratic corruption at the top of the Church hierarchy.

=== Late modern period ===
In the 19th century in Christian Europe, communists were believed to have adopted atheism. In Protestant England, the word communism was too close to the Catholic communion rite, hence socialist was the preferred term. Friedrich Engels argued that in 1848, when The Communist Manifesto was published, socialism was respectable in Europe while communism was not. The teachings of Jesus are frequently described as socialist, especially by Christian socialists, such as Terry Eagleton. The Owenites in England and the Fourierists in France were considered respectable socialists, while working-class movements that "proclaimed the necessity of total social change" denoted themselves communists. This branch of socialism produced the communist work of Étienne Cabet in France and Wilhelm Weitling in Germany. Weitling was the leader of the Christian communist League of the Just whose stated goal was "the establishment of the Kingdom of God on Earth, based on the ideals of love of one's neighbor, equality and justice". This was also referred to by the League as the "new Jerusalem".

In the earliest years of the Mormon movement, Joseph Smith promoted the law of consecration and the concept of the United Order. Today, some Mormon fundamentalist groups still apply this principle. Christian socialism was one of the founding threads of the Labour Party in the United Kingdom and is said to begin with the uprising of John Ball and Wat Tyler in the 14th century.

Pehr Götrek translated The Communist Manifesto into Swedish the same year it was published in German. He made changes in it from his Christian influence, such as changing the now famous quote, Workers of the world, unite! to Folkets röst, guds röst! (Vox populi, vox Dei, or "People's voice is God's voice"). He also wrote several works criticising the developing capitalist society from a Christian perspective. Igal Halfin of Tel Aviv University argues the Marxist ethos that aims for unity reflects the Christian universalist teaching that humankind is one and that there is only one god who does not discriminate among people.

In 1914 the American socialist leader Eugene Debs declared that "Pure communism was the economic and social gospel preached by Jesus Christ, and every act and utterance which may properly be ascribed to him conclusively affirms it". He argued that subsequently Christ's words have been co-opted and diluted by individuals to serve their own ends.

Early 20th century science fiction author and socialist Olaf Stapledon stated that "Marxism and Christianity spring from the same emotional experience". Fidel Castro believed, "Christ chose the fishermen because he was a communist", In his book "Fidel and Religion", Castro states that there is a "great coincidence between Christianity's objectives and the ones we Communists seek, between the Christian teachings of humility, austerity, selflessness, and loving thy neighbour and what we might call the content of a revolutionary's life and behaviour". Castro saw a similarity to his goals with the goals of Christ: "Christ multiplied the fish and the loaves to feed the people. That is precisely what we want to do with the Revolution and socialism", adding that, "I believe Karl Marx could have subscribed to the Sermon on the Mount".

Ho Chi Minh, although venerated as a communist leader in Vietnam and of a Confucian family background, was well-disposed to Christianity. He said: "The good side of Confucianism is the cultivation of personal ethics. The good side of Christianity is noble benevolence. The good side of Marxism is the dialectical method. The good side of Sun Yat-sen is that his thinking is suitable to the conditions in Vietnam. Do Confucius, Jesus, Marx and Sun Yat-sen not all have the same good side? They all sought the happiness for the people, and prosperity for the society. If today, they were still alive, if they were gathered in the same place, I believe they would certainly be living together in perfect harmony, as good friends. I strive to be their little student". He also used the language of Christianity and quoted Bible stories to appeal to Catholics in Vietnam in the fight against France and America, as well as calling for unity between Catholics and followers of other religions. Ho Chi Minh Thought is said to have absorbed ideals from Christianity.

Nicaraguan Sandinista activist, priest and former Minister for Culture Ernesto Cardenal was a proponent of the idea of Christian communism, saying "Christ led me to Marx...for me, the four Gospels are all equally Communist. I’m a Marxist who believes in God, follows Christ and is a revolutionary for his Kingdom". He later said "The Bible is full of revolutions. The prophets are people with a message of revolution. Jesus of Nazareth takes the revolutionary message of the prophets. And we also will continue trying to change the world and make revolution. Those revolutions failed, but others will come".

==== China ====
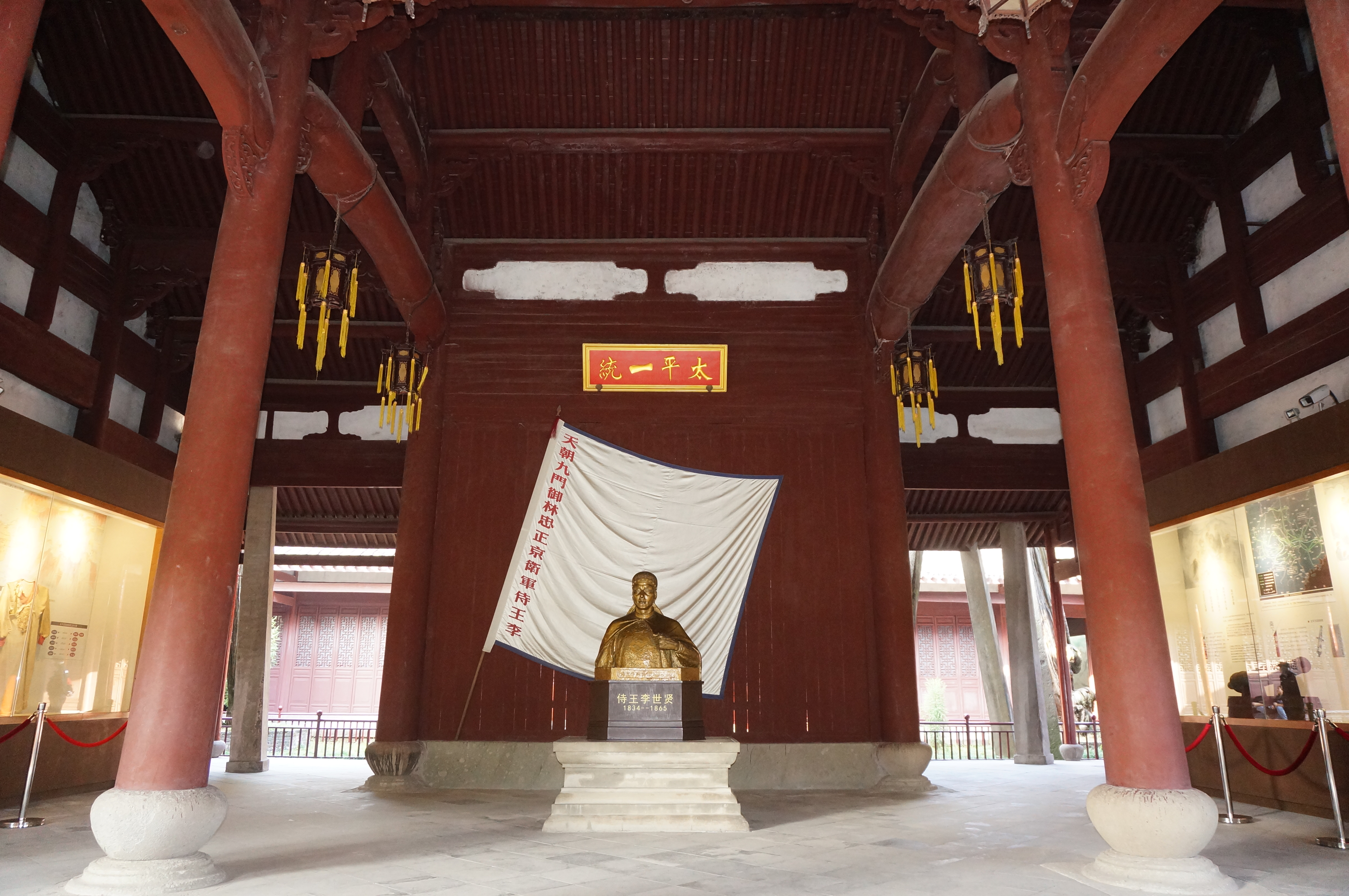
Site of King Shiwang's Residence of the Taiping Heavenly Kingdom, used by Taiping Rebellion general Li Shixian as a command centre in Zhejiang

The participants in the Taiping Heavenly Kingdom rebellion, a syncretic Christian-Shenic theocratic kingdom, are viewed by the Chinese Communist Party as proto-communists. Soong Ching-ling, a Methodist, was recognized in China with the title of Honorary Chairman of the People's Republic of China.

== Basis ==
Christian communists typically regard biblical texts in Acts 2 and Acts 4 as evidence that the first Christians lived in a communist society. Scholars generally agree that the Acts of the Apostles and the Gospel of Luke were written by the same person. In Luke 12:33, Jesus commands his disciples to sell what they have and give alms, and in Luke 14:33 says that no one can be his disciple who has not forsaken all his possessions. Some historians confirm the view that a form of communism was taught by Jesus and practised by the apostles.

"All who believed were together and had all things in common; they would sell their possessions and goods and distribute the proceeds to all, as any had need. ... Now the whole group of those who believed were of one heart and soul, and no one claimed private ownership of any possessions, but everything they owned was held in common. ... There was not a needy person among them, for as many as owned lands or houses sold them and brought the proceeds of what was sold. They laid it at the apostles' feet, and it was distributed to each as any had need."

— Acts 2:44–45, Acts 4:32–35

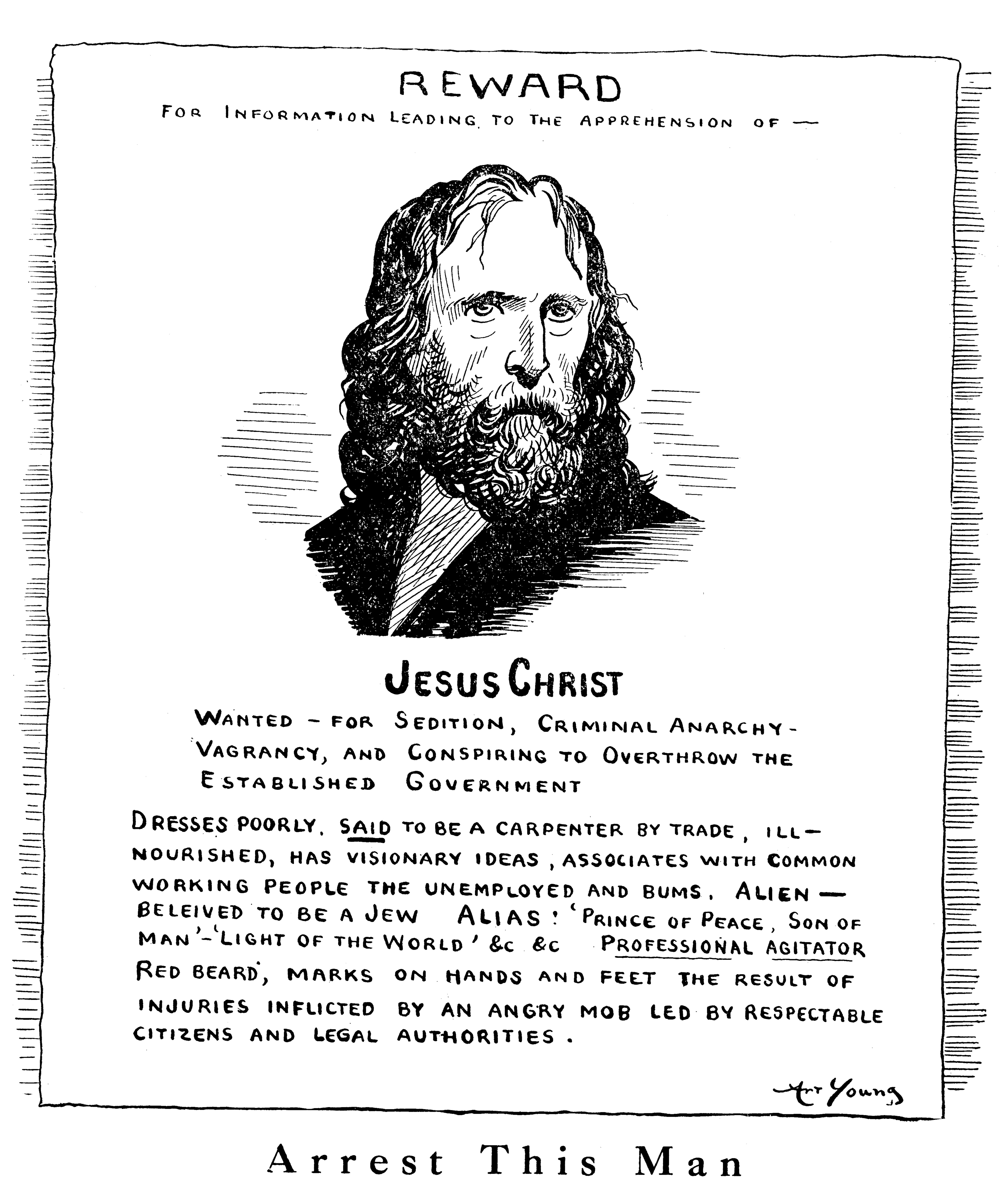
The Masses, 1917 political cartoon by the socialist cartoonist Art Young

Among those historians who support the Christian communist view, Montero offers anthropological evidence that the practices recounted in Acts 4:32–35 were historical and were practised widely and taken seriously during at least the first two centuries of Christianity. Other biblical evidence of anti-capitalistic belief systems include Matthew 6:24, which said: "No one can serve two masters. Either you will hate the one and love the other or you will be devoted to the one and despise the other. You cannot serve both God and money." The slogan "Each according to his abilities" has biblical origins. Acts 11:29 states: "Then the disciples, every man according to his ability, determined to send relief unto the brethren which dwelt in Judaea." Additionally, the phrase "To each according to his needs" has a biblical basis in Acts 4:35, which says "to the emissaries to distribute to each according to his need".

Various authors, including Thomas Wharton Collens, José Porfirio Miranda, and José Míguez Bonino, describe biblical sources supporting a common-property society. Bonino wrote: "Is it altogether absurd to re-read the resurrection today as a death of the monopolies, the liberation from hunger, or a solidary form of ownership?" Bonino and Miranda argue against the belief that "Scripture has various meanings", which in their view allow Western conservative theologians "to prevent the Bible from revealing its own subversive message", and that "use the Biblical text ... to defend the status-quo of a pre-revolutionary situation", as summarized by Andrew Kirk. Miranda said: "I am not introducing the Bible to Marx. ... I only wish to understand what the Bible says. ... We want to take the Bible seriously."

Christian communism does not depend merely on the principles of the early apostles, and Christian communists argue that anti-capitalist ideals are deeply rooted in the Christian faith. While modern capitalism had not yet formed in the time of Jesus, his message was overwhelmingly against the love of money and greed, and in support of the poor. Christian communists see the principles of Christ as staunchly anti-capitalist in nature. Since "the love of money is a root of all kinds of evil" (1 Timothy 6:10), it seems natural for Christians to oppose a social system founded—as Christian communists argue—entirely on the love of money. Capitalism is heavily based in the collection of usury, which was condemned for centuries by the Church based in numerous scriptures. Christian opposition to the emergence of such an interest-based system largely delayed capitalist development and capitalism did not gather popular support until John Calvin endorsed capitalist practice from a religious perspective.

== Groups ==
Several Christian groups formerly practised common ownership and others continue to do so. They may or may not have explicitly used the English term communist for self-identification. Extant groups include:

- Bruderhof
- Church of Bible Understanding
- Cutlerites
- Evangelical Association of the Israelite Mission of the New Universal Covenant
- Gloriavale Christian Community
- Hutterites
- Jesus Christians
- Jesus People USA
- Koinonia Partners
- Padanaram Settlement
- Reba Place Fellowship
- Shakers
- Sojourners Community
- Twelve Tribes communities

Historically, many groups have practised Christian communism, and may or may not be extant, depending on the case, including:

- Aaronic Order
- Adonai-Shomo
- Amana Colonies (Community of True Inspiration)
- Followers of Thomas Müntzer
- Aurora Colony
- Batenburgers
- Diggers
- Dulcinians
- Jesus Army
- Labadists
- Levellers
- Harmony Society
- Oneida Community
- Peoples Temple
- Society of Separatists of Zoar
- United Order Family of Christ
- Waldensians
- Zwijndrechtse Nieuwlichters

== Reception ==
Both Christian communism and liberation theology stress orthopraxy in Christianity over orthodoxy. A narrative of the nature of contemporary social struggles is developed via materialist analysis utilizing historiographic concepts developed by Marx. A concrete example are the Paraguayan landless movement Sin Tierra, who engage in direct land seizures and the establishment of socialized agricultural cooperative production in asentamientos. The contemporary Paraguayan Sin Tierra operate in a very similar manner as that of the reformation era Diggers. For Camilo Torres Restrepo, a member and leader of the Colombian National Liberation Army, developing this orthopraxis meant celebrating the Eucharist only among those engaged in armed struggle against the army of the Colombian state while fighting alongside them. In Australia, the academic Roland Boer has attempted to synthesize Calvinism and Marxism.

In a September 1962 sermon, Martin Luther King Jr., a democratic socialist and social gospel advocate, said that "no Christian can be a communist". He stated that "basic philosophy of Christianity is unalterably opposed to the basic philosophy of communism", citing what he saw as rampant secularism and materialism in communism as evidence that communism "leaves out God". He further said that "for the communist there is no divine government or no absolute moral order, there are no fixed, immutable principles." Nevertheless, King acknowledged that "although communism can never be accepted by a Christian, it emphasizes many essential truths that must forever challenge us as Christians." He added:

"Communism in society is a classless society. Along with this goes a strong attempt to eliminate racial prejudice. Communism seeks to transcend the superficialities of race and color, and you are able to join the Communist Party whatever the color of your skin or the quality of your blood, the quality of blood in your veins. ... No one can deny that we need to be concerned about social justice. ... Karl Marx arouses our conscience at this point. ... So with this passionate concern for social justice, Christians are bound to be in accord. Such concern is implicit in the Christian doctrine of the Fatherhood of God and the brotherhood of man. Christians are always to begin with a bias in favor of a movement which protests against unfair treatment of the poor, but surely Christianity itself is such a protest. The Communist Manifesto might express a concern for the poor and the oppressed, but it expresses no greater concern than the manifesto of Jesus, which opens with the words: 'The spirit of the Lord is upon me, because He hath anointed me to preach the gospel to the poor; He has sent me to heal the brokenhearted, to preach deliverance to the captive, recovering the sight of the blind; to set at liberty them that are bruised, to proclaim the acceptable year of the Lord.' ... We won't have to worry ... [about] communism. ... It can never be defeated with ammunition. It can never be defeated with missiles. ... The only way that we can defeat communism is to get a better idea, and we have it in our democracy. ... We have it in our Christianity."

== Relation with Marxism ==
Christian communists may or may not agree with various parts of Marxism, such as on the way a socialist or communist society should be organized. Christian communists also share some of the political goals of Marxists, for example replacing capitalism with socialism, which should in turn be followed by communism at a later point in the future. The young Louis Althusser and Denys Turner are among Christian or Christianity-influenced philosophers who asserted the coherence of Christianity and Marxism. Althusser said: "I became communist because I was Catholic. I did not change religion, but I remained profoundly Catholic. I don't go to church but this doesn't matter; you don't ask people to go to church. I remained a Catholic, that is, an internationalist universalist. I thought that inside the Communist Party there were more adequate means to realize universal fraternity." In 1960s Communist Czechoslovakia, dialogue between Marxist and Christian philosophers and theologians was co-organized at Charles University by Milan Machovec in Czech and German, with notable participants including Ernst Bloch and Erich Fromm.

Roland Boer, the son of a Presbyterian minister, said: "There is a tradition within Marxism of engagement with religion that is usually characterised as atheistic and disinterested, but I argue there is a continuous stream of major Marxist figures who have written on questions of religion and engaged specifically with the Bible or with theological debate. Some people contend that Marxism borrowed its main ideas from Christianity and Judaism and reconstructed them as secular ideology, but I think that is extremely simplistic – the relationship is much more complex." About Karl Marx's famous quote about religion being the "opium of the people", he argues it has been largely misinterpreted, and that at that time opium was both valued and denounced for its medicinal qualities and its addictive potential. He said: "That ambivalence over religion is really what is embodied in Marx's metaphor, rather than the notion that it is just a drug that dulls the senses and makes you forget your suffering." About Christian communism, he said: "The Christian communist tradition is what really interests me and keeps me involved with religion. I am fascinated by the radical, revolutionary dimension of Christianity."

Latin American liberation theology influenced parts of the evangelical movement and Catholic bishops in the United States. Its purported use of "Marxist concepts" led in the mid-1980s to an admonition by the Vatican's Congregation for the Doctrine of the Faith (CDF). While stating that "in itself, the expression 'theology of liberation' is a thoroughly valid term", the prefect Cardinal Ratzinger rejected certain forms of Latin American liberation theology for focusing on institutionalized or systemic sin and for identifying Catholic Church hierarchy in South America as members of the same privileged class that had long been oppressing Indigenous populations from the arrival of Pizarro onward.

While the theology of Pope Francis has been described as critical of capitalism and sympathetic to socialism, Francis has expressed varying interpretations of Marxism in particular. In 2013, Pope Francis said: "The ideology of Marxism is wrong. But I have met many Marxists in my life who are good people, so I don't feel offended." When asked about being labeled a Leninist by a blog post in The Economist in 2014, Francis said: "The communists have stolen our flag. The flag of the poor is Christian. Poverty is at the center of the Gospel." He added that communism came "twenty centuries later". In 2024, Pope Francis argued that Christians and Marxists, socialists, and communists shared a common mission and expressed support for the Marxist-Christian dialogue group Dialop.

== See also ==
General

- Catholicity
- Catholic communism
- Camilism
- Che Jesus
- Christian left
- Christian views on poverty and wealth
- Doctor Communis
- Ebionites
- "He who does not work, neither shall he eat"
- Jesus in Christianity
- Jesuism
- Jesuit reduction
- League of the Just
- Marxism and religion
- Materialism and Christianity
- The Protestant Ethic and the Spirit of Capitalism

People

- Alain Badiou
- Hewlett Johnson
- John Goodwyn Barmby
- Étienne Cabet
- Terry Eagleton
- Denys Turner
- Katayama Sen
- Y. T. Wu
- Slavoj Žižek
- Manuel Pérez

Other Christian left perspectives

- Christian anarchism
- Christian egalitarianism
- Christian socialism

== Bibliography ==
- Bang, Gustav (2006) [1916]. "2. The Rise of Christianity. Christian Communism" (PDF). Crises in European History. Socialist Labor Party. p. 24.
- Boer, Roland (2009). "Conclusion: What If? Calvin and the Spirit of Revolution. Bible". Political Grace. The Revolutionary Theology of John Calvin. Louisville, Kentucky: Westminster John Knox Press. p. 120. ISBN 978-0-664-23393-8.
- Campbell, Heather M., ed. (2009). The Britannica Guide to Political Science and Social Movements That Changed the Modern World. The Rosen Publishing Group. pp. 127–129. ISBN 978-1-61530-062-4.
- Ehrhardt, Arnold (1969). "St Peter and the Twelve". The Acts of the Apostles. Manchester: University of Manchester Press. ISBN 978-0719003820.
- Ellicott, Charles John; Plumptre, Edward Hayes (1910). "III. The Church in Jerusalem. I. Christian Communism". The Acts of the Apostles. London: Cassell.
- Guthrie, Donald (1992) [1975]. "3. Early Problems. 15. Early Christian Communism". The Apostles. Grand Rapids, Michigan: Zondervan. p. 46. ISBN 978-0-310-25421-8.
- Halteman Finger, Reta (2007). "Reactions to Style and Redaction Criticism". Of Widows and Meals. Communal Meals in the Book of Acts. Cambridge, UK: Wm. B. Eerdmans Publishing Co. ISBN 978-0-8028-3053-1.
- Johnson, Daniel (1 December 2013). "Winstanley's Ecology: The English Diggers Today". Monthly Review.
- Lansford, Tom (2007). "History of Communism". Communism. Political Systems of the World. Marshall Cavendish. pp. 24–25. ISBN 9780761426288.
- "Rénan's Les Apôtres. Community life". The London Quarterly and Holborn Review, Volume 26. London. 1866 [April and July].
- Montero, Roman A. (2017). All Things in Common The Economic Practices of the Early Christians. Eugene: Wipf and Stock Publishers. ISBN 9781532607912. OCLC 994706026.
- Renan, Ernest (1869). "VIII. First Persecution. Death of Stephen. Destruction of the First Church of Jerusalem". Origins of Christianity. Vol. II. The Apostles. New York: Carleton. p. 152.
- Stearns, Peter; Fairchilds, Cissie; Lindenmeyr, Adele; Maynes, Mary Jo; Porter, Roy; Radcliff, Pamela; Ruggiero, Guido, eds. (2001). Encyclopedia of European Social History: From 1350 to 2000. Vol. 3. Charles Scribner's Sons. p. 290. ISBN 0-684-80577-4.
- Unterbrink, Daniel T. (2004). "The Dead Sea Scrolls". Judas the Galilean. iUniverse. ISBN 0-595-77000-2.
- von Mises, Ludwig (1981) [1951]. "Christianity and Socialism". Socialism. New Heaven: Yale University Press. ISBN 9780913966624.
