= Black Reichswehr =

1920s German extra-legal paramilitary

- Schwarze Reichswehr
- Active: 1921–1923
- Disbanded: October 1923
- Country: Weimar Republic
- Type: Paramilitary
- Size: 50,000 to 80,000 at peak
- Engagements: Küstrin Putsch

Commanders
- Notable commanders: Fedor von Bock; Kurt von Schleicher; Eugen Ott

The Black Reichswehr (German: Schwarze Reichswehr) was the unofficial name for the extra-legal paramilitary formation that was secretly a part of the German military (Reichswehr) during the early years of the Weimar Republic. It was formed in 1921 after the German government, under pressure from the Entente, banned the Freikorps. General Hans von Seeckt thought that the Reichswehr no longer had enough men available to guard the country's borders, but the army could not be expanded because of the manpower restrictions imposed on it by the Treaty of Versailles.

In order to circumvent the limitation, Seeckt created the Black Reichswehr as purportedly civilian "labour battalions" (Arbeitskommandos) attached to regular Reichswehr units. The Arbeitskommandos received military training, provisioning and orders from the Reichswehr, although ultimately they were never involved in military action. The Black Reichswehr reached a peak membership estimated at 50,000 to 80,000 in 1923 and was dissolved the same year after a group of its members launched the failed Küstrin Putsch. Its existence became widely known in 1925 when its practice of Fememord, the extra-judicial killing of "traitors" among its ranks, was revealed to the public.

== Background ==
=== Treaty of Versailles ===
When the Treaty of Versailles set the conditions for peace following Germany's defeat in World War I, it put tight restrictions on the size and weaponry of the German military. It limited the army to a total of 100,000 men and 4,000 officers. Conscription was prohibited, and the military was to be exclusively devoted to the maintenance of internal order and control of the borders. The Treaty also prohibited the construction of aircraft, heavy artillery and tanks, and the production of materials for chemical warfare. The navy was placed under equally tight restrictions and was in particular prohibited from building or acquiring submarines.

The harsh terms of the Treaty, which also included demilitarisation of the Rhineland, payment of reparations to the Allies and Germany being forced to accept sole responsibility for the war, were intended to ensure that Germany could never again pose a military threat to Europe. The Germans saw it as a national humiliation, and revising the Treaty's terms became an important part of the politics of the Weimar Republic. Nationalists were drawn to parties on the Right that promised to rearm Germany and restore its great power status in Europe and the world.

=== Freikorps ===
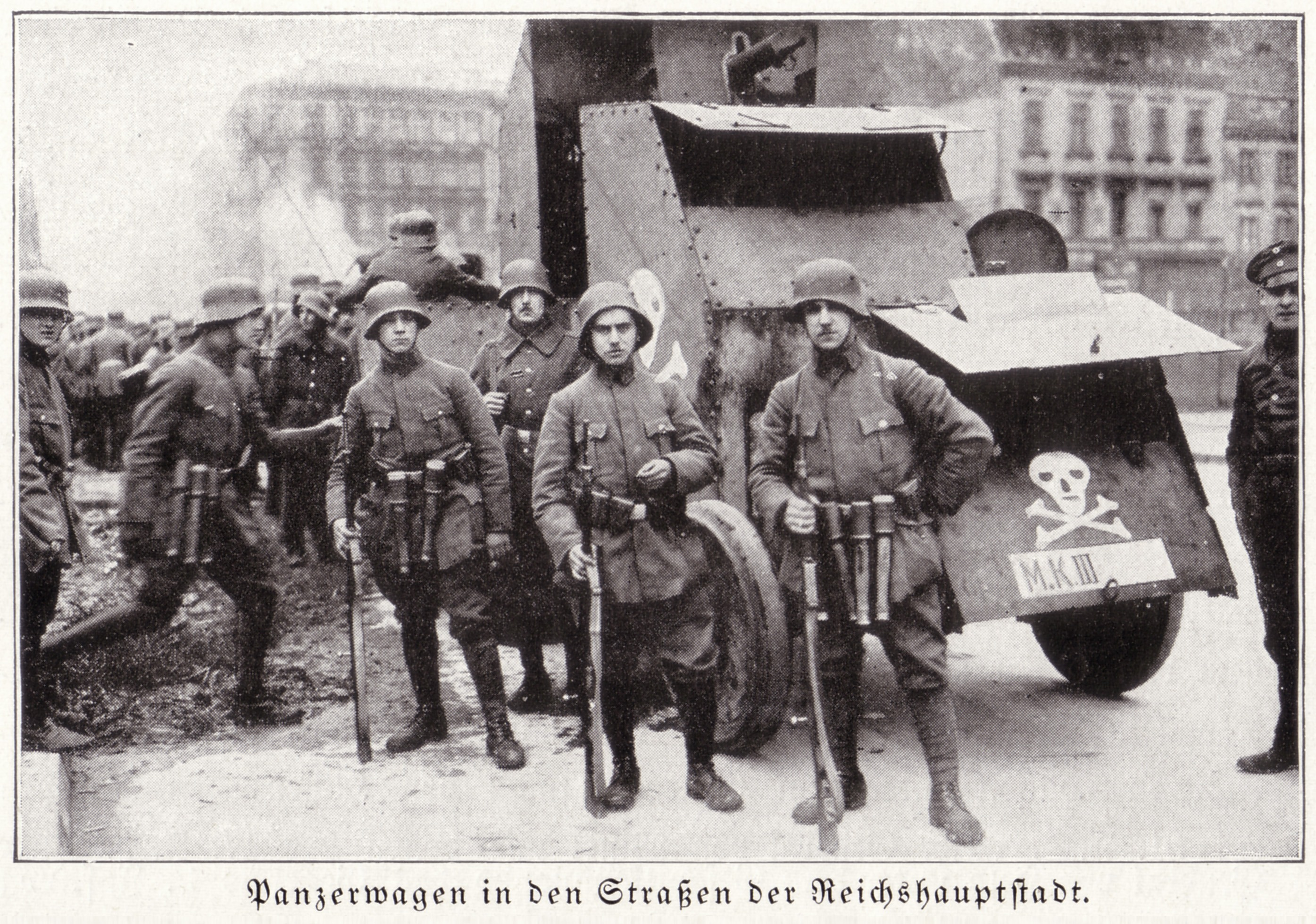
Armed Freikorps troops in Berlin in 1919: "Armored car in the streets of the Reich's capital"

The Black Reichswehr had its roots in the Freikorps movement that sprang up following the end of World War I. Many demobilised soldiers from the Imperial Army joined paramilitary groups collectively known as the Freikorps. It is estimated that between 1918 and 1923 some 500,000 men were formal Freikorps members with another 1.5 million participating informally. In the turbulent early days of the Weimar Republic, the government in Berlin accepted the Freikorps as necessary and used them to defeat the Spartacist uprising in January 1919 and put down several local attempts to set up soviet republics, such as in Bremen and Bavaria. The Kapp Putsch of March 1920 caused the government's view of the Freikorps to change from acceptance to concern about whether they could be controlled. When Defence Minister Gustav Noske ordered two major Freikorps units to be disbanded in late February 1920, they refused and took a leading role in the putsch. General Hans von Seeckt, who was appointed chief of the Army Command shortly after the putsch collapsed and who had disliked the un-military spirit of independence and rebellion within the Freikorps, then removed almost all of its members from the Reichswehr and limited Freikorps access to government funding and equipment.

The Freikorps' last large-scale military action came during the third Silesian uprising, which began on 2 May 1921. Current and former Freikorps members from all over Germany went to the contested area in the southeast of the state of Prussia to fight the Polish insurgents. After the Freikorps won the Battle of Annaberg on 23 May 1921, the French issued an ultimatum demanding that Germany end its support of all paramilitary forces. The next day, to the shock of the Freikorps, who were expecting to follow up their victory by keeping all of Upper Silesia for Germany, German president Friedrich Ebert bowed to the French demand and banned the Freikorps. Also playing a role in his decision was the London ultimatum of 5 May 1921, which threatened an occupation of the heavily industrialized Ruhr district if Germany did not accept a new schedule for war reparations payments. It included a statement declaring Germany in default of the Treaty of Versailles' disarmament requirements, in part due to the number of men in the Freikorps.

== Arbeitskommandos ==
=== Formation ===
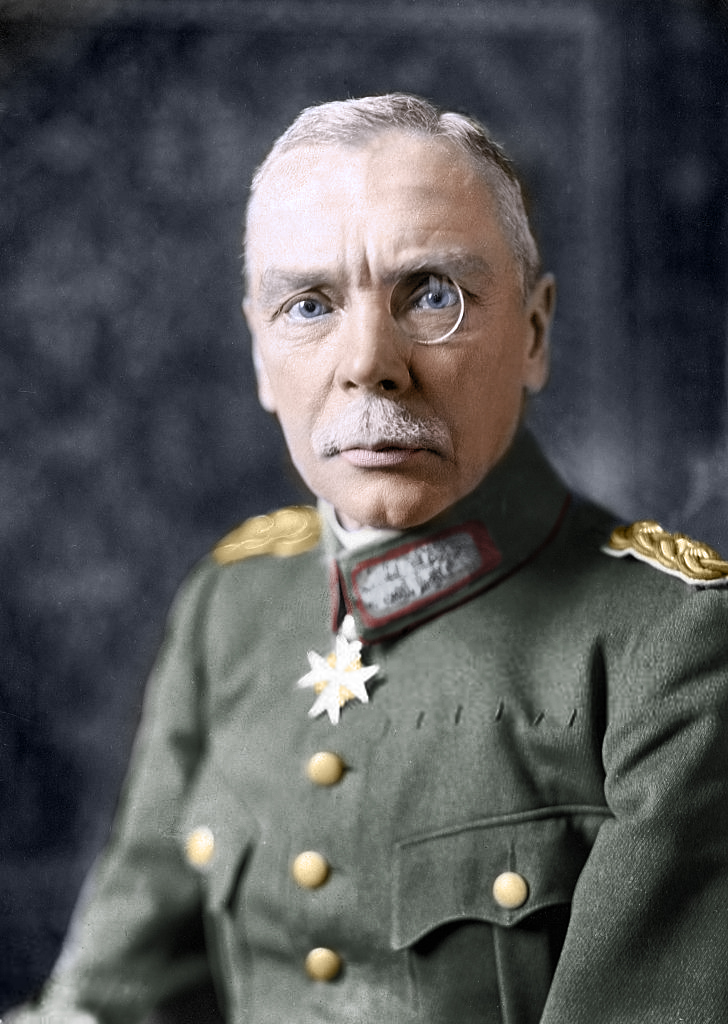
General Hans von Seeckt. He was chief of the German Army Command when the Black Reichswehr was formed.

The loss of government support for the Freikorps in 1920 and then its banning in 1921 left large numbers of former members at loose ends. General Seeckt and Chancellor Joseph Wirth were able in the short run to focus the men's anger towards the outside rather than against the Republic. With Wirth's agreement, Seeckt used the opportunity to clandestinely increase the strength of the Reichswehr beyond the 100,000-man limit imposed by the Treaty of Versailles, which he thought was not enough to defend Germany's borders. In order to get around the treaty restrictions, the Reichswehr created labour battalions (Arbeitskommandos, or AKs) attached to regular army units. The Treaty of Versailles allowed work groups such as the AKs but only for the limited purposes that were spelled out in Article 206: "The German Government must in all cases furnish at its own cost all labour and material required to effect the deliveries and the works of destruction, dismantling, demolition, and of rendering things useless, provided for in the present Treaty." It was these innocuous sounding labour groups that became what was later called the Black Reichswehr.

The Prussian state government under Minister President Otto Braun and Interior Minister Carl Severing, both of the Social Democratic Party, actively worked with the Reichswehr to set up the framework for the AKs. Its members, officially volunteer civilian labourers on short-term contracts, wore regular Reichswehr uniforms, were quartered with the Reichswehr and received military training and orders from it. They also had identifications that corresponded to the Reichswehr's. In the summer of 1921, Bruno Ernst Buchrucker was hired by the Reichswehr on a private contract to build up the AKs. Within two years, he had expanded it to a group with 2,000 permanent members and 18,000 more on standby. The latter came mostly from nationalist organisations and underwent four- to six-week training courses.

Some of the work that the AKs did technically fell under the terms of Article 206, for example collecting and disposing of illegal arms left over from the war. Because the Reichswehr wanted its auxiliaries to be well-armed, it had the AKs increase the number and extent of arms searches and then had them keep the good weapons that they found for the Black Reichswehr's use and turn the useless ones over to the Allies.

=== Expansion during the occupation of the Ruhr ===
When French and Belgian troops occupied the Ruhr in January 1923 in response to Germany's default on its reparations payments, both the Berlin government and General Seeckt knew that they could not use the Reichswehr to oppose the move without sparking a war. The official German policy was therefore limited to passive resistance. At around the same time, Poland demanded the "rectification" of the German-Polish border and Lithuanian troops occupied Memel. Realizing that they could not protect the nation's borders, Seeckt and the government under Chancellor Wilhelm Cuno, a political independent, agreed to expand the Arbeitskommandos. By September 1923, their number had reached an estimated 50,000 to 80,000 men. In addition, Reichswehr leadership put various paramilitary units, which like the AK's were under the army's control and not independent militia units, on call for potential use against the French. None of these units, however, ever went into action.

== Leadership, funding and right-wing contacts ==
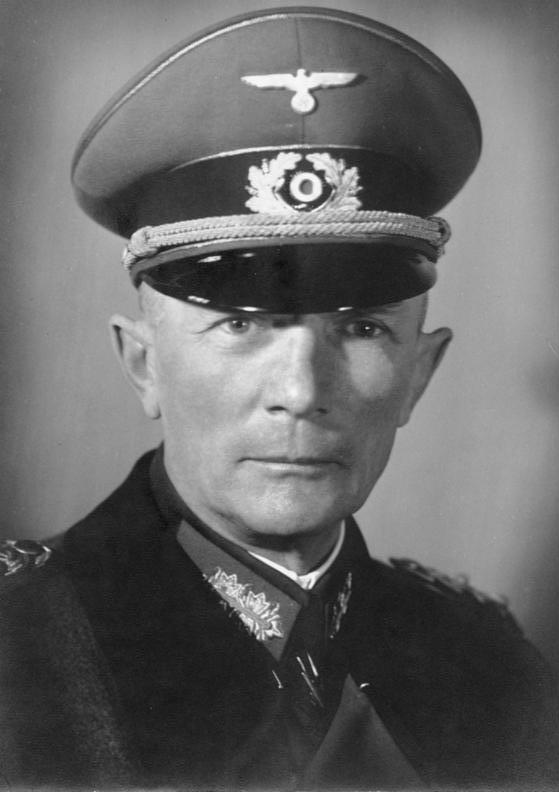
General Fedor von Bock, who commanded the Black Reichswehr

Major Fedor von Bock was in overall command of the Arbeitskommandos and the Black Reichswehr; Kurt von Schleicher, who later became the Weimar Republic's last chancellor, served as his main liaison with the Reichswehr. Captain Eugen Ott was the intelligence officer. First Lieutenant Paul Schulz worked with Bruno Buchrucker in setting up the Arbeitskommandos.

The Black Reichswehr was funded from a number of sources at levels that generally are not known. The majority of the support came from secret government accounts; from heavy industry, which expected to benefit from rearmament; agricultural groups, especially in the east where owners of large estates felt particularly threatened and were natural allies of the Reichswehr; and from support given by other militias and right-wing groups.

Following the occupation of the Ruhr, Chancellor Cuno held talks with various right-wing militias who offered their assistance in dealing with the French. Representatives of heavy industry, including the conglomerate owned by Hugo Stinnes, were involved in the talks. Stinnes introduced General Seeckt to Erich Ludendorff, who had a large number of contacts among the Right. Defence Minister Otto Gessler had made such contacts illegal in February 1923, and some Reichswehr members had been discharged from the service as a result. Seeckt nevertheless encouraged regional Reichswehr leaders to keep up the contacts. In the spring of 1923, he himself talked with Freikorps leaders Georg Escherich, Gerhard Rossbach and Franz von Epp about bringing their troops into the Reichswehr if a military conflict broke out.

On 23 August there was a meeting at Ludendorff's house attended by Adolf Hitler, Buchrucker and Kurt Jahnke. They talked about what to do if resistance to the Ruhr occupation broke down and agreed that the response should start with the Black Reichswehr. Most of the attendees – but not Hitler – wanted to set up a right-wing dictatorship when the government abandoned passive resistance, which it did in September, although without any response from the Black Reichswehr.

== Military activity ==
The Black Reichswehr saw essentially no direct action. During the crises of early 1923, there were only about 1,000 Black Reichswehr troops in Berlin, making it of little use there. They were occasionally on active duty, for example as sentries at government buildings such as the presidential palace. Some of the guards there spoke of being able to take President Friedrich Ebert into custody at the right moment. Black Reichswehr troops also paraded in front of Reichswehr Minister Gessler and Army chief of staff Seeckt.

== Feme murders ==
Within the Black Reichswehr, discipline for offenses such as insubordination were handled by methods similar to those used by the regular Reichswehr. The situation was entirely different when it came to thefts from the Black Reichswehr's illegal arms stockpiles or – which was considered far worse – the betrayal of their locations or of other members. Given the fact that the Black Reichswehr were officially civilians, the military penal code could not be used against such "traitors", and because of the need for secrecy, neither could they be handed over to civil authorities.

The result was the use of the Feme, named after medieval special courts that judged particularly serious offenses. Paul Schulz oversaw the carrying out of Feme justice, which generally took the form of quick and secret murders of those suspected of being traitors. It is not certain how many murders the Black Reichswehr was responsible for; the number killed under the Feme by all right-wing extremist groups is estimated at about 350.

In 1925 a former member of the Black Reichswehr named Carl Mertens revealed many of the activities of the group, including the Feme murders, to the magazine Die Weltbühne. An investigation by the Prussian Parliament corroborated the published information, and the matter was turned over to the courts. Paul Schulz was put on trial for his role in the Feme and sentenced to death in 1927, although in the end he served only a few years behind bars.

During the testimony, counsel alleged that the Feme murders were carried out under the orders of Reichswehr leaders, including Bock, Schleicher and even Seeckt. Whether or not those allegations were true, the press coverage of the trials revealed a considerable amount of secret information about the Black Reichswehr and its activities.

The Reichswehr and Defence Minister Gessler denied publicly that the Black Reichswehr existed, although Seeckt wrote a letter to the court admitting that there was such a group and defending the need for it and for keeping it secret. The revelations about the Black Reichswehr led to the fall of the government of Wilhelm Marx at the end of 1926.

== Küstrin Putsch and dissolution ==
A group of a few hundred Black Reichswehr men led by Bruno Buchrucker attempted a coup on 1 October 1923. It centred around the fortress at Küstrin, on the Elbe river in Brandenburg, and at Spandau in Berlin, and was a reaction to the government's decision to end passive resistance against the French and Belgian occupation of the Ruhr. Buchrucker believed that he could use the extreme Right's anger at the government to start a national uprising with the assistance of various right wing defence organisations. Bock, who had received intelligence about increased activity among such groups, called Buchrucker in and asked him about "excessive recruitment to the Black Reichswehr". Buchrucker admitted that he had done so in order to be prepared for an imminent communist uprising. Bock issued an arrest warrant against Buchrucker, who hurried to Küstrin to initiate the putsch, which was quickly put down by Reichswehr troops. Buchrucker was taken into custody and sentenced to ten years imprisonment.

In response to the putsch, General Seeckt dissolved the Black Reichswehr. Some of the members continued to receive support for their activities from large landowners in East Prussia, while others, especially officers, went to Bavaria and joined the Nazi Party.

At the cabinet session of Chancellor Gustav Stresemann on 3 October 1923, a report was delivered that detailed the disarming of the Black Reichswehr units at Döberitz and Spandau. The section on Döberitz, where the Reichswehr had a large proving ground, included the following:

At the Döberitz training camp two days ago, a troop unit of the Black Reichswehr, the Löwenfeld regiment, which was 2 battalions strong, was disarmed by the Potsdam cavalry regiment (Uhlans) of the Reichswehr. The Black Reichswehr in Döberitz had a battery of 8 guns, including 21 and 15 cm guns. Heavy mine launchers and machine guns were also present. The members of the Black Reichswehr were extremely angry with their officers, whom they felt had betrayed them. ... [They] complained that on the day the Potsdam Uhlans arrived, no officers were to be seen, so that they were completely leaderless. The members of the Black Reichswehr were all arrested. Some were given the offer to join the Reichswehr if they complied with the prescribed conditions. Most of them had no inclination to do so.

== Notable members ==
Although the name Black Reichswehr is sometimes applied to all Freikorps that were used by the German government or the Reichswehr, it is most commonly limited to the clandestine units that were directly a part of the Reichswehr. The differing usages can lead to confusion as to whether an individual or even a group belonged to the Freikorps or to the Black Reichswehr. The following men were in the Black Reichswehr under the narrower definition:

- Gottlob Berger, senior Nazi and SS official
- Hans-Jürgen von Blumenthal, army officer executed in 1944 for his role in the 20 July plot to assassinate Adolf Hitler
- Fedor von Bock, head of the Black Reichswehr and field marshal in World War II
- Karl-Heinrich Brenner, general in the Waffen-SS
- Bruno Ernst Buchrucker, Black Reichswehr leader and head of the Küstrin Putsch
- Hans Georg Calmeyer, lawyer who saved thousands of Jews in Nazi-occupied Netherlands
- Hermann Ehlers, second president of the West German Bundestag (1950–1954)
- Arnold Ehrhardt, professor of law and theologian
- Nikolaus von Halem, lawyer, businessman and resistance fighter against Nazism
- Hans Hayn, SA-Gruppenführer and Reichstag deputy, murdered in the Night of the Long Knives
- Konstantin Hierl, Nazi Reichsleiter and head of the Reich Labour Service
- Kurt Hintze, Nazi politician and SS brigade leader
- Kurt Jahnke, German-American intelligence agent and saboteur
- Hans Krüger, SS judge in Poland and West German Federal Minister for Displaced Persons, Refugees and War Victims (1963–1964)
- Julius Lippert, Nazi politician and mayor of Berlin
- Friedrich Lütge, economist, social historian and economic historian
- Helmuth von Pannwitz, Lieutenant General of the Wehrmacht, SS-Obergruppenführer of the Waffen-SS; involved in Feme murders
- Hans Ramshorn, SA-Brigadeführer, police chief of Gleiwitz and Reichstag deputy, murdered in the Night of the Long Knives
- Paul Schulz, at the center of the Black Reichswehr's Feme murders and later Nazi Party official
- Gustav Sorge, SS concentration camp guard
- Baldur Springmann, neo-Nazi politician, pioneer in the West German environmental movement who helped found Green Party
- Walter Stennes, leader in the Nazi SA (Brownshirts)
- Fritz Warnecke, Wehrmacht general

== In popular culture ==
The Black Reichswehr is featured in Babylon Berlin, the German neo-noir television series based on the 2008 novel Der nasse Fisch (The Wet Fish) by Volker Kutscher. In the first two seasons, the organisation is depicted as plotting a coup of the Weimar Republic to restore the German Empire, returning Wilhelm II to the throne and installing Erich Ludendorff as Chancellor. The character of Generalmajor Seegers, the fictional ringleader of the plot, is an amalgamation of several historical Reichswehr officers, including Hans von Seeckt and Kurt von Hammerstein-Equord.
