= Religious communalism =

Religious communalism may refer to:

- Religious communism, common ownership within a religious community
- Religious communalism (South Asia), sectarian conflict among religious groups in South Asia
