= Forever Family =

Forever Family may refer to:

- Forever Family (UK), also known as the FF Force
- Church of Bible Understanding, originally known as the Forever Family
