= Religious communism =

Form of communism that incorporates religious principles

Religious communism is a form of communism that incorporates religious principles. Scholars have used the term to describe a variety of social or religious movements throughout history that have favored the common ownership of property. There are many historical and ideological similarities between religious communism and Liberation Theology.

== Overview ==
The term religious communism has been used to describe a variety of social or religious movements throughout history. The "commune of early Christians at Jerusalem" has been characterised as a group that practiced religious communism. The teachings of Mazdak (died c. 524 or 528 CE), a religious proto-socialist Persian reformer, have also been referred to as early communism. According to Ben Fowkes and Bulent Gokay, Bolshevik Mikhail Skachko stated at the Congress of the Peoples of the East in 1920 that "the Muslim religion is rooted in principles of religious communism, by which no man may be a slave to another, and not a single piece of land may be privately owned."

== Definition ==
T. M. Browning described religious communism as a form of communism that "springs directly from principles native to a religion", and Hans Hillerbrand defined religious communism as religious movements that advocated the "communal ownership of goods and the concomitant abrogation of private property". Browning and Hillerbrand distinguished religious communism from political communism, as well as from economic socialism. Additionally, Hillerbrand contrasts religious communism with Marxism, which he describes as an ideology that called for eliminating religion. Donald Drew Egbert and Stow Persons argued that "[c]hronologically, religious communism tended to precede secular [communism]." Other scholars suggested that the traditional political communism, or Marxism, has always been a variety of religion.

In Christian Europe, communists were believed to have adopted atheism. In Protestant England, communism was too close to the Catholic communion rite, and socialist was the preferred term. Friedrich Engels argued that in 1848, when The Communist Manifesto was published, socialism was respectable in Europe while communism was not. The Owenites in England and the Fourierists in France were considered respectable socialists, while working-class movements that "proclaimed the necessity of total social change" denoted themselves as communists. This branch of socialism produced the communist work of Étienne Cabet in France and Wilhelm Weitling in Germany.

== History ==
Some scholars have used religious communism to describe some 17th-century Protestant movements that "disavow[ed] personal property". Bhabagrahi Misra and James Preston described the "religious communism of the Shakers" as a "community in which all goods are held in common". Larry Arnhart described "religious communism in the Oneida Community" as a system where "[e]xcept for a few personal items, they shared all their property". Albert Fried wrote that "American religious communism reached its apogee" in the 1850s "[w]ith the rise of the Oneida community".

According to Rod Janzen and Max Stanton, the Hutterites believed in strict adherence to biblical principles and "church discipline" and practiced a form of communism. The Hutterites "established in their communities a rigorous system of Ordnungen, which were codes of rules and regulations that governed all aspects of life and ensured a unified perspective. As an economic system, Christian communism was attractive to many of the peasants who supported social revolution in sixteenth century central Europe" such as the German Peasants' War and "Friedrich Engels thus came to view Anabaptists as proto-Communists".

Other scholars have used the term religious communism to describe a communist social movement that developed in Paris in the 1840s, which was organized by "foreign-born, primarily German-speaking, journeyman-artisans who had settled there". In the early 20th century, before the rise of Bolshevism in Russia, some intellectuals advocated for implementing a form of communism that incorporated Christian ideology "as an alternative to Marxism". Additionally, some Catholic theologians organized groups in the late 20th century to create a dialogue between the Catholic Church and the Communist Party of Italy.

=== Christian communism ===
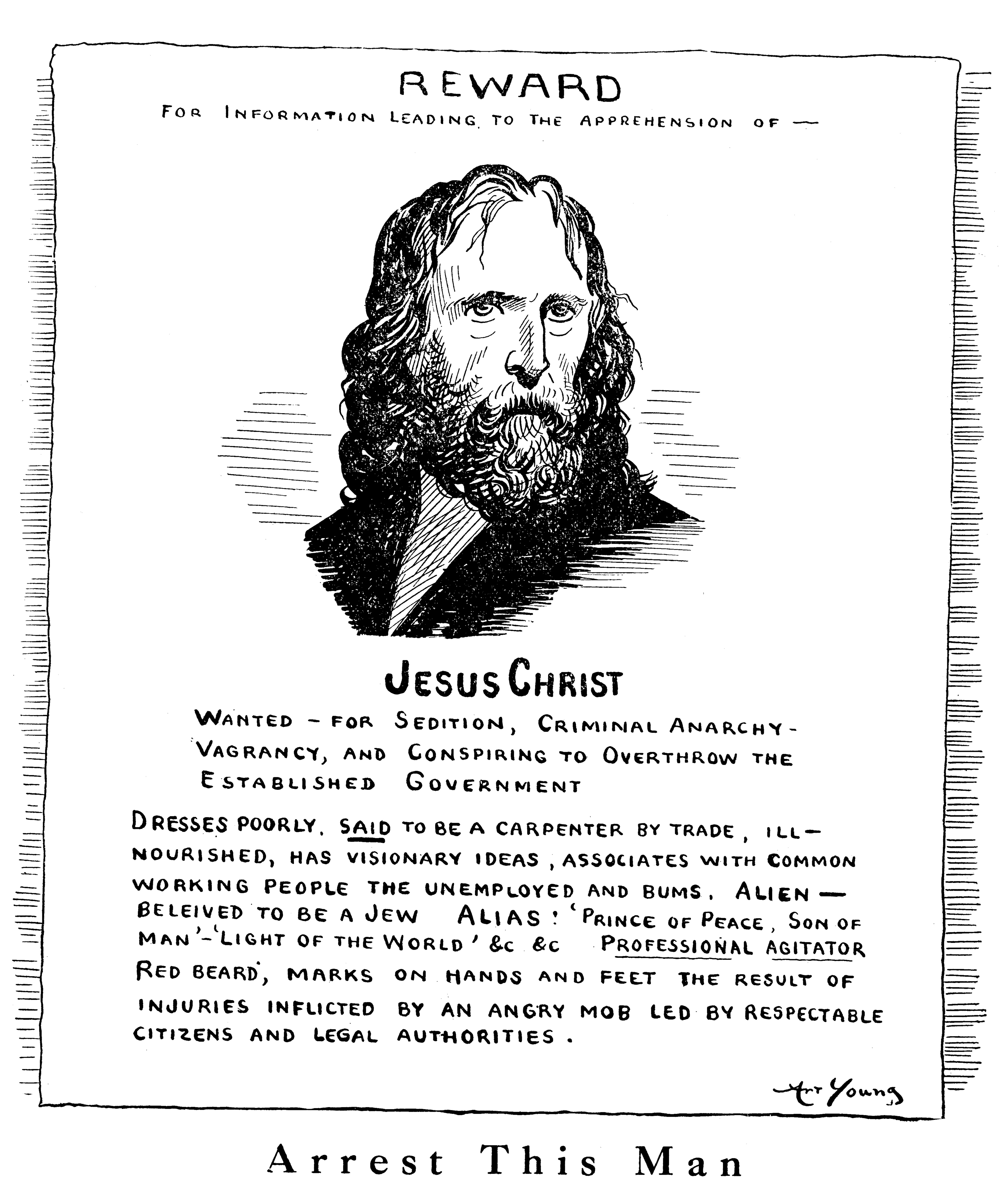
The Masses, 1917 political cartoon by the socialist cartoonist Art Young

The teachings of Jesus are frequently described as communist by religious Christian communists and other communists. Acts 4:35 records that the early church in Jerusalem, "[n]o one claimed that any of their possessions was their own"; the pattern would later disappear from church history except within monasticism. Christian communists view the early Christian Church, as described in the Acts of the Apostles, as an early form of communism and religious socialism. The view is that communism was just Christianity in practice, and Jesus was the first communist. This link was highlighted in one of Karl Marx's early writings, which stated that "[a]s Christ is the intermediary unto whom man unburdens all his divinity, all his religious bonds, so the state is the mediator unto which he transfers all his Godlessness, all his human liberty." Thomas Müntzer led a significant Anabaptist communist movement during the 16th-century German Peasants' War, which Friedrich Engels analyzed in The Peasant War in Germany. The Marxist ethos that aims for unity reflects the Christian universalist teaching that humankind is one and that there is only one god who does not discriminate among people.

Christian communism is an early form of socialism and pre-Marxist communism based on Christianity. It is a theological and political theory based upon the view that the teachings of Jesus compel Christians to support communism as the ideal social system. Although there is no universal agreement on the exact date when Christian communism was founded, many Christian communists say that evidence from the Bible suggests that the first Christians, including the Apostles in the New Testament, established their small communist society in the years following Jesus' death and resurrection. While critics of socialism including Catholic social teaching propounded by several popes argue that Jesus was more communitarian than communist, many advocates of Christian communism and other communists, including Karl Kautsky, argue that it was taught by Jesus and practiced by the apostles. Several independent historians have supported the latter view.

In the 16th century, English writer Thomas More, venerated in the Catholic Church as a saint, portrayed a society based on common property ownership in his treatise Utopia, whose leaders administered it through reason. Several groupings in the English Civil War supported this idea, especially the Diggers, who espoused clear communistic yet agrarian ideals. Oliver Cromwell and the Grandees' attitude to these groups was, at best, ambivalent and often hostile. Criticism of the idea of private property continued into the Enlightenment era of the 18th century through such thinkers as the profoundly religious Jean-Jacques Rousseau. Raised a Calvinist, Rousseau was influenced by the Jansenist movement within the Catholic Church. One of the main Jansenist aims was democratizing to stop the aristocratic corruption at the top of the Church hierarchy. The participants of the Taiping Rebellion, who founded the Taiping Heavenly Kingdom, a syncretic Christian-Shenic theocratic kingdom, are viewed by the Chinese Communist Party as proto-communists.

=== Islamic communism ===
Researchers have commented on the communistic nature of the society built by the Qarmatians of the Ismaili around Al-Ahsa Oasis from the 9th to 10th centuries. Kenneth Rexroth describes their community as practicing "communism of the urban gang or the roving band of robbers", while Jacques Bidet states that communism is inherent to modernity, and so no example in antiquity or medieval times qualifies as true communism due to a lack of class consciousness in those eras.

Islamic Marxism attempts to apply Marxist economic, political, and social teachings within an Islamic framework. An affinity between Marxist and Islamic ideals of social justice has led some Muslims to embrace forms of Marxism since the 1940s. Islamic Marxists believe that Islam meets the needs of society and can accommodate or guide the social changes Marxism hopes to accomplish. Islamic Marxists are also dismissive of traditional Marxist views on materialism and religion.

== See also ==
- Acts 4
- Anarchism and religion
- Buddhist socialism
- Christian anarchism
- Christian communism
- Christian socialism
- Diane Drufenbrock
- Ebionites
- Hutterite
- Islamic socialism
- Labor Zionism
- Marxism and religion
- Mazdakism
- Religious socialism
- Sabbath economics
- United Order
- Utopian socialism

== Bibliography ==
- Bailey, Liberty Hyde (1909). Cyclopedia of American Agriculture: Farm and community. Macmillan. p. 299.
- Bang, Gustav. Crises in European History (PDF).
- Boer, Roland (2009). "Conclusion: What If? Calvin and the Spirit of Revolution. Bible". Political Grace. The Revolutionary Theology of John Calvin. Louisville, Kentucky: Westminster John Knox Press. ISBN 978-0-664-23393-8.
- Chase, Daryl (1938). The Early Shakers: An Experiment in Religious Communism. University of Chicago.
- Ehrhardt, Arnold (1969). "St Peter and the Twelve". The Acts of the Apostles. Manchester: University of Manchester Press. ISBN 978-0719003820.
- Ellicott, Charles John; Plumptre, Edward Hayes (1910). "III. The Church in Jerusalem. I. Christian Communism". The Acts of the Apostles. London: Cassell.
- Guarneri, Carl J. (1994). The Utopian Alternative: Fourierism in Nineteenth-century America. Cornell University Press. p. 82. ISBN 9780801481970.
- Guthrie, Donald (1992) [1975]. "3. Early Problems. 15. Early Christian Communism". The Apostles. Grand Rapids, Michigan: Zondervan. p. 46. ISBN 978-0-310-25421-8.
- Halteman Finger, Reta (2007). "Reactions to Style and Redaction Criticism". Of Widows and Meals. Communal Meals in the Book of Acts. Cambridge, UK: Wm. B. Eerdmans Publishing Co. ISBN 978-0-8028-3053-1.
- Lansford, Tom (2007). "History of Communism". Communism. Political Systems of the World. Marshall Cavendish. ISBN 9780761426288.
- "Rénan's Les Apôtres. Community life". The London Quarterly and Holborn Review, Volume 26. London. 1866 [April and July].
- Renan, Ernest (1869). "VIII. First Persecution. Death of Stephen. Destruction of the First Church of Jerusalem". Origins of Christianity. Volume II. The Apostles. New York: Carleton.
- von Mises, Ludwig (1981) [1951]. "Christianity and Socialism". Socialism. New Heaven: Yale University Press. ISBN 9780913966624.
- Montero, Roman A. (25 April 2017). All Things in Common The Economic Practices of the Early Christians. Eugene, Oregon: Wipf and Stock Publishers. ISBN 9781532607912. OCLC 994706026.
- Unterbrink, Daniel T. (2004). "The Dead Sea Scrolls". Judas the Galilean. Lincoln: iUniverse. ISBN 0-595-77000-2.
