= Per Götrek =

Swedish communist (1798–1876)

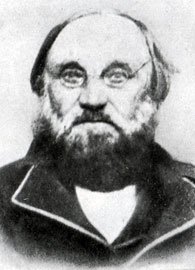
Per Götrek

Anders Peter "Per" Götrek (born Godberg; 8 March 1798 – 6 December 1876) was an early Swedish Christian communist. He was also a teetotaler and a vegetarian.

Anders Peter Godberg was born 8 March 1798 in Linköping. and changed his name to Götrek as a student. After graduating, he moved to Stockholm in 1818 and became a teacher, a book printer and also kept an antiquarian bookshop in Södermalm. He published books explaining Saint-Simon's "revealed religion" in the 1830s, then turning his focus towards Étienne Cabet in 1846 and in 1847 he wrote a book expounding on Charles Fourier. He was the first to import and translate the Communist Manifesto by Karl Marx and Friedrich Engels, in 1848, the same year it was published in German. However, Götrek, took the liberty to alter some parts of the Manifesto, including the now famous quote, Workers of the world, unite!, which Götrek, being a religious man, changed to Folkets röst, guds röst! (i.e. Vox populi, vox Dei, or "People's voice is God's voice"). He also wrote several works criticising the developing capitalist society from a Christian perspective.

He had a small group of intellectual followers and the group became an underground club for political discussions, but never really any practical political work. Even though Götrek read Marx, he was more of a utopian socialist than a revolutionary Marxist.

The Communist Manifesto was later more accurately retranslated by Axel Danielsson, and then Zeth Höglund.

Götrek died in Karlskrona on 6 December 1876.
