= Reba Place Fellowship =

Intentional community in Illinois

Coordinates: 42°1′48″N 87°40′55″W

Reba Place Fellowship is a Christian intentional community in Evanston, Illinois, within the Chicago metro area. Founded in 1957, Reba Place Fellowship is the oldest urban Christian commune in the United States. Families and singles share life together in houses and apartments owned by Reba Place in two different Chicago neighborhoods, one in Evanston and the other in Rogers Park. The community shares a common purse, where paychecks are pooled, and members are given monthly allowances. After distributing personal and family living expenses, Reba uses the remainder "to further God's Kingdom," by meeting needs within the group, or furthering ministries outside of the community.

== The Overground Railroad ==
In the 1980s, Reba Place Fellowship, in conjunction with Jubilee Partners initiated the "Overground Railroad," a collaborative effort among 60 churches to help hundreds of illegal immigrants from Central America cross over into Canada. The name "Overground Railroad" was chosen, to distinguish it from some of the illegal actions taken by the "Underground Railroad" inspired Sanctuary movement. Instead, the Overground Railroad set out to defy the spirit, but not the letter of INS laws, by seeking asylum in Canada for the population of (what was mostly) Salvadoran and Guatemalan refugees. If Canadian asylum was not achievable, the group used techniques to extend the asylum process in the U.S., to minimize and delay the possibility of deportation.
