= Hans Georg Calmeyer =

German lawyer (1903–1972)

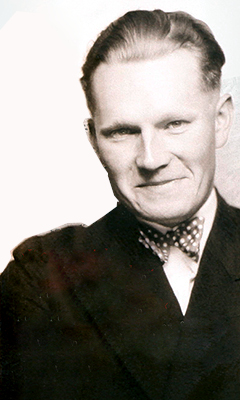
Hans Calmeyer

Hans Georg Calmeyer (German: [hans ˈɡeː.ɔʁk ˈkalˌmaɪ̯.ɐ]; 23 June 1903 – 3 September 1972) was a German lawyer from Osnabrück who saved thousands of Jews from certain death during the German occupation of the Netherlands from 1941 until 1945. On 4 March 1992, Yad Vashem recognised Hans Calmeyer as Righteous Among the Nations.

In 2020, Yad Vashem historians began researching newly uncovered evidence suggesting that Calmeyer also helped send hundreds of people directly into death camps during the Dutch occupation. It is generally accepted that Calmeyer would "sacrifice" some people to save others. His actions risked drawing attention from his superiors. After the war, Willy Lages, the German police chief in Amsterdam, remarked that "to him Calmeyer's activities had always been a book with seven seals."

Calmeyer saved the lives of at least 3,000 people, but was simultaneously responsible for sending 500 others to death camps. During an interview in 1967, he admitted to knowing about the Final Solution, and that the rejecting of an appeal was effectively a death sentence. He said the decisions haunted him at night, and having to decide over life and death made him feel like a murderer.

== Early life ==
Calmeyer studied Law at the University of Freiburg, Marburg University, and the Ludwig-Maximilians-Universität München. In 1923, as a member of the Black Reichswehr, he took part in Hitler's attempted Beer Hall Putsch. He later opened his law practice in Osnabrück, where he enjoyed an excellent reputation as a lawyer. In 1933, his license to practice law was revoked because of his suspected communist leanings. Ten months later, his license was reinstated. He was a member of the Federation of the National Socialist German Lawyers but not of the Nazi Party.

== Nazi occupation ==
In 1940, Calmeyer, serving as a soldier and a member of an aerial defense intelligence unit, took part in the invasion of the Netherlands by the German Army. In 1941, he was active in the Reichskommissariat, which was in charge of all occupied districts in the Netherlands. While there, Calmeyer was appointed director of the interior administration, which also handled Jewish affairs, thus enabling him to clear racially ambiguous Jewish cases for the German occupational administration in The Hague.

Unlike the policy in Germany, Dutch people of Jewish descent could protest their registration as full-blooded Jews by documenting and proving their ancestry through word of mouth or by presenting birth certificates to demonstrate partial non-Jewish descent. Calmeyer described the purpose of his position as "to build a lifeboat." He accepted falsified ancestry papers that documented subjects as Aryan or half-Jewish. He also provided Jews advice regarding stratagems and excuses that they could provide to avoid registration as full-blooded Jews. Despite warnings from the Nazi regime, he persisted in his work.

Approximately 5,660 individuals submitted requests and were designated as doubtful cases through Calmeyer's office. Of them, at least 3,700 were spared deportation and certain death. However, about 1,960 were transported by the Germans to various concentration camps for extermination, most notably Auschwitz-Birkenau and Sobibor.

After the war, Calmeyer was interned in Scheveningen from May 1945 to September 1946.

== Legacy and later controversy ==
According to a description of Calmeyer by German president Johannes Rau: "Calmeyer joined the ranks of human beings who helped, but who were also guilty of being caught up in the unjustifiable wrongdoings of the regime." Calmeyer's acts were nearly forgotten until a movement to honor him arose during the 1980s. On 4 March 1992, Yad Vashem honored Calmeyer posthumously as Righteous Among the Nations. On 2 January 1995, the town of Osnabrück awarded him its highest award, the Moesermedaille, with Calmeyer's son and Israeli ambassador Avi Primor in attendance.

In later years, Calmeyer's heroism has been questioned and challenged by some researchers. One author stated that Calmeyer did his administrative duties and sent people to their deaths, calling him "an important cog in the machinery of systematic murder". One 92-year-old Holocaust survivor claimed that Calmeyer had her sent to Auschwitz and threatened to have her non-Jewish Catholic father deported. Another Holocaust survivor, Femma Fleijsman, claims that Calmeyer rejected her appeal and sent her to Bergen-Belsen.

A petition was delivered to the German embassy in The Hague in opposition to plans to name a German building after Calmeyer. Historian Petra van den Boomgaard has stated: "Calmeyer did help many Jews, and there is a large group of people who attribute their survival to him and who are still very grateful to him for this. Until September 1943 there was a real chance of a request for revision being granted, but after that Calmeyer came under pressure. He was betrayed several times by Dutch parties involved in the review process during that period."

Ongoing research has examined why Calmeyer did not approve more of the requests that he had received. Journalist Hans Knoop writes: "Calmeyer honored about 2,500 objections, but also rejected around 1,500. He just performed official work and never did anything outside the lines, he was never in danger." Others argue that the SS became suspicious of Calmeyer and that he was being watched, placing him in a desperate position in which he was forced to choose which Jews to save.
