= Baldur Springmann =

German farmer and neo-Nazi politician

- Born: 31 May 1912; Hagen, Germany
- Died: 24 October 2003 (aged 91); Lübeck, Germany
- Spouse: Ilse Bünsow (m. 1942; died 1981)
- Military career
- Allegiance: Nazi Germany
- Branch: Sturmabteilung

Baldur Springmann (31 May 1912 – 24 October 2003) was a German organic farmer, publicist, and neo-Nazi politician. One of the pioneers of the environmentalist movement in West Germany, Springmann helped found The Greens before withdrawing to involve himself in right-wing extremism.

Springmann is considered an important figure in ecofascist ideology.

== Career ==
Springmann was born in Hagen in 1912. He wanted to become a farmer after graduating from high school. He completed an agricultural apprenticeship, studied agriculture and used his inheritance to buy a 50-hectare property near Wismar in Mecklenburg.

Early on, Springmann was also active in right-wing radical groups. He was a "lieutenant" in the Black Reichswehr, an illegal paramilitary gang. He was a member of the Stahlhelm and a youth worker at the Reichsnährstand. He was also a member of the SA until March 1934, then of the SS and from 1 February 1940 of the NSDAP (membership number 7,433,874).

In World War II, he was deployed as a German soldier in air defense. He fled from the Red Army across the Baltic Sea and was therefore not captured.

In the FRG he founded a farm in Schleswig-Holstein and practiced anthroposophical "biodynamic agriculture".

== Involvement in Green politics ==
In the 1970s he was a founding member of the "Green List Schleswig Holstein" and in 1980 of the federal party "The Greens". In the same year, however, he resigned and became involved with the conservative ÖDP.

From around 1983, he became active in the German right-wing radical and right-wing extremist spectrum.

== Far-right extremism ==
Today, Springmann is viewed positively by the neo-Nazi National Democratic Party.

== Death and legacy ==
Springmann died in 2003, having drifted to the extreme right.
