= Hans Ramshorn =

German Nazi and SA general (1892–1934)

Polizeipräsident, Gleiwitz
- In office 25 March 1933 – 30 June 1934

Führer, SA-Untergruppe Oberschlesien
- In office 1 July 1932 – 30 June 1934

Additional positions
- 1932–1934: Reichstag Deputy

Personal details
- Born: 17 March 1892 Mittelwalde, Province of Silesia, Kingdom of Prussia, German Empire
- Died: 1 July 1934 (aged 42) near Breslau, Nazi Germany
- Cause of death: Execution by firing squad
- Party: Nazi Party
- Other political affiliations: German Völkisch Freedom Party
- Occupation: Military officer

Military service
- Allegiance: German Empire; Weimar Republic
- Branch/service: Royal Prussian Army; Freikorps
- Years of service: 1910–1920
- Rank: Hauptmann
- Unit: Infantry Regiment 21 (4th Pomeranian); Freikorps Roßbach; 3rd Marine Brigade
- Battles/wars: World War I Kapp Putsch; Third Silesian Uprising; Ruhr Uprising
- Awards: Iron Cross, 1st & 2nd class Baltic Cross; Order of Military Merit (Bulgaria); Wound Badge

Hans Erich Alexander Ramshorn (17 March 1892 – 1 July 1934) was a German professional military officer who fought in the First World War and in the Freikorps. He became a police officer in the Weimar Republic and also served in the Black Reichswehr. He joined the Nazi Party and its paramilitary organization, the Sturmabteilung, attaining the rank of SA-Brigadeführer and commanding the SA in Upper Silesia where he became the Polizeipräsident of Gleiwitz (today, Gliwice). He was among those murdered in the Night of the Long Knives when Adolf Hitler purged the SA leadership corps.

== Early life, military career and World War I ==
Ramshorn was born in Mittelwalde (today, Międzylesie) in the Province of Silesia, the son of a Prussian Army Major and customs officer. After attending preparatory school, Ramshorn joined the Royal Prussian Cadet Corps in 1902 to train for a career as a professional army officer. He initially attended the Wahlstatt Cadet Preparatory School near Liegnitz (today, Legnica) and transferred to the Preußische Hauptkadettenanstalt (Prussian Main Cadet Academy) in Berlin-Lichterfelde. On 1 March 1910, Ramshorn was commissioned as a Leutnant in Infantry Regiment 21 (4th Pomeranian) "von Borcke". He spent the following four and a half years at the regiment's headquarters in Thorn (today, Toruń). According to his biographer, Daniel Schmidt, the "monotonous peacetime routine" in Thorn may have contributed to Ramshorn's lifelong addiction to alcohol and gambling.

Beginning in August 1914, Ramshorn fought in the First World War on the eastern front. On 20 August 1914, during the Battle of Gumbinnen, Ramshorn received a bullet wound in the shoulder. After his recovery, he was given command of a company in October 1914. In 1915, he was promoted to the rank of Oberleutnant. On 5 September 1916, his company was cut off and destroyed. He and other survivors were taken prisoner of war by the Imperial Russian Army and spent the next year and a half in prison camps in Siberia.

During the October Revolution in the winter of 1917–1918, Ramshorn managed to escape and, on 24 May 1918, he arrived in Riga, where he reported back to the German lines. On 20 August 1918, Ramshorn resumed command of a company in the 21st Infantry Regiment, which was now deployed on the western front in France. On 30 August 1918, Ramshorn's company came under heavy artillery fire and he was wounded in the upper arm by grenade shrapnel. At the end of the war in November 1918, he was still recuperating in a military hospital in Kolberg (today, Kołobrzeg). During the war, he was awarded the Iron Cross, 1st and 2nd class, the Baltic Cross, the Order of Military Merit (Bulgaria) with crown and swords, and the Wound Badge.

== Freikorps service ==
After the end of the war, various volunteer units were formed to secure the German eastern border. Ramshorn's regiment formed a detachment that joined the Grenzschutz Ost (Eastern Border Guard) in Thorn in December 1918. By early 1919, Ramshorn was a Freikorps fighter as the commander of a machine gun company with the Eastern Border Guard, serving until August 1919.

After the signing of the Treaty of Versailles, German formations remaining in the border area defied evacuation orders in August 1919 and instead sought to establish an independent German-controlled Baltic state. In the late summer of 1919, elements of the border guard troops joined Freikorps Roßbach and began a march to the Baltic states at the end of October. Ramshorn and other members of his regiment joined the march to the Torņakalns district of Riga and relieved the encircled German units there. However, in the face of the superior strength of the Latvian troops, the Freikorps fled southward to the German eastern border, which they reached at the end of December. Their retreat was accompanied by numerous acts of violence, including mass murder, rape, arson, and looting.

After returning from the Baltic in early 1920, Ramshorn transferred from his disbanded regiment to the 3rd Marine Brigade under Korvettenkapitän Wilfried von Loewenfeld, where he became a company commander. His hopes of being accepted into the newly formed Reichswehr were dashed as there was no place for him in the reduced 100,000 man army. To avoid and hopefully prevent demobilization, some army formations including Loewenfeld's, attempted to overthrow the new republican government in the Kapp Putsch of March 1920. On 13 March, they entered Breslau (today, Wrocław), deposed the local Oberpräsident, arrested many officials, and mistreated and murdered a number of them. They also fired indiscriminately into crowds, killing several civilians. After the Kapp Putsch collapsed following a general strike called by the ousted government, Loewenfeld's men withdrew from Breslau.

The Loewenfeld Freikorps next was deployed to the Ruhr region in early April 1920 to suppress the Ruhr uprising by workers intending to establish a soviet republic. Ramshorn's company participated in heavy fighting around Bottrop and Gladbeck. The use of heavy weapons and arbitrary executions led to the deaths of numerous civilians in these battles. After the city's occupation, Gladbeck was systematically searched for members of the Red Ruhr Army, most of whom were immediately executed after their capture. On 17 April 1920 in Essen, a Freikorps soldier was injured when a Marine Brigade hay wagon collided with a tram. Ramshorn was ordered to arrest the tram driver, who was suspected of sympathizing with the revolutionaries. Ramshorn handed his subordinate carrying out the arrest a piece of paper with a cross on it. When the soldier asked what the symbol meant, Ramshorn replied that the prisoner should not arrive back at headquarters alive. The alleged revolutionary was arrested and shot during a staged escape attempt. Until the withdrawal of the Marine Brigade on 7 May 1920, numerous further executions of this kind took place.

== Career in the security police ==
Ramshorn left the military with the rank of Hauptmann. On 1 August 1920, he was accepted into the security police as a Polizeihauptmann (police captain) and he was able to secure the transfer of many of his former comrades into police service. In October 1920, Ramshorn and his unit were assigned to the Düsseldorf police department. Upon the occupation of Düsseldorf by French troops on 8 March 1921 to enforce the Allied demands for reparations, Ramshorn's forces were displaced. Ramshorn was humiliated at having to surrender to his former enemies without a fight and later reported that he had been overcome by a deep emotion as he had to endure the French occupation.

Ramshorn was deployed in the following weeks against supporters of communism in the Prussian province of Saxony. On 21 March 1921, the Communist Party of Germany (KPD) called for a general strike and announced it would resort to armed struggle. Armed workers occupied the Leuna works south of Merseburg and there were clashes between the communists and the police. The Prussian government declared a state of emergency and ordered several thousand police officers to the area. Ramshorn and his company reached the province on 25 March 1921. During the capture of Bischofrode on 27 March, several civilians were shot by a police detail on the orders of a police captain, who, according to Schmidt, must have been Ramshorn. Ramshorn later testified to a committee of inquiry of the Landtag of Prussia that these dead were insurgents killed in combat, even though he had arrested two of those shot shortly before as looters. He claimed that they had been shot while attempting to escape. After the capture of Querfurt on 28 March, Ramshorn again ordered the shooting of an alleged looter brought before him. A few hours later, Ramshorn's detachment confronted a crowd of about 70 men and not a single insurgent survived the clash. Ramshorn's company was selected to lead the assault on the last communist bastion, the Leuna works, on 29 March. Upon capturing the factory premises, Ramshorn's men killed numerous occupiers and mistreated the survivors.

At the time of the third Silesian uprising, the Düsseldorf police department was relocated to Upper Silesia on 5 May 1921. At this time, Ramshorn was accused of serious misconduct in the line of duty: complaints alleged that he was addicted to alcohol and gambling, heavily in debt and a homosexual. He was also accused of anti-republican and antisemitic sentiments. His biographer, Schmidt, judges that "massive antisemitism was an essential component" of Ramshorn's worldview, which he passed on to his men. He escaped dismissal from the police force out of consideration "for his previous services" though he received a reprimand, was transferred to Osnabrück and had his company summarily disbanded. However, applications from numerous of his former subordinates for transfer to Osnabrück were approved, so that his former command was soon largely reunited.

In a personnel assessment from August 1922, his new superior in Osnabrück criticized Ramshorn for a "significant deterioration of morals". During his first year in Osnabrück, Ramshorn had "indulged in drinking, gambling, and women, did not always demonstrate sufficient restraint in public, and did not always strike the right tone in his dealings with his superiors". The hope that the transfer to the provinces would have a positive impact on Ramshorn was not fulfilled. The unreliable and anti-government attitude of Ramshorn's Osnabrück police unit, indications of the police captain's secret collaboration with anti-republican circles and hostility towards the labor movement, as well as investigations against him for cheating, ultimately led to Ramshorn's dismissal from the police force on 31 March 1923. His biographer, Schmidt, concluded that Ramshorn's police career failed due to several factors: the incompatibility of his military orientation and police practice, his disloyalty to the Republic, and the incompatibility of his lifestyle with that of his peers in the police, who were more oriented towards the self-image of the pre-war professional police officer.

== Activity in the Black Reichswehr ==
In April 1923, Ramshorn joined the Black Reichswehr, a covert military formation parallel to the official Reichswehr, which was intended to support the regular troops in the event of internal threats. In the summer of 1923, he formed his own company of former subordinates on an estate in Ihlow in Oberbarnim and led clandestine formations in Fort Hahneberg and in the Elsgrund camp on the Döberitz military training area. He also acted as a recruiter for the Black Reichswehr and planned to facilitate a putsch against the Weimar Republic. For this purpose, he traveled to Osnabrück in the summer of 1923, to recruit former subordinates and to build up support for a putsch among the officers who remained in police service.

The noticeable increase in the number of personnel in the Black Reichswehr caused the Reich government to fear a loss of control over it and, at the end of September 1923, they ordered its dissolution. On 1 October 1923, formations of the Black Reichswehr mutinied in Küstrin, Spandau, and Fort Hahneberg. This so-called Küstrin Putsch was quickly put down. A subsequent investigation revealed that three police officers in Osnabrück had joined the coup at Ramshorn's instigation. Those affected were given severe disciplinary punishments, but despite their hostility to the republic, they were not dismissed from civil service.

In March 1924, Ramshorn was indicted before the Naumburg Regional Court for ordering the shooting of the worker in Querfurt in 1921. Due to the staunchly nationalist stance of the prosecutor and the judges, who openly sympathized with him, as well as the support of the German nationalist press, which praised his actions against "red traitors", he was acquitted. After his release from pretrial detention, Ramshorn moved to Mecklenburg, where he remained in hiding on the estates of friendly landowners.

== Return to police service ==
On 1 July 1924, Ramshorn joined the Mecklenburg-Strelitz State Police, where he again became a police captain. After a short time, Ramshorn's dissolute lifestyle, which was difficult to reconcile with the demands of police service, became apparent in the form of excess alcohol consumption with subordinates, with whom he also sought sexual relationships. When he very openly solicited a waiter at a drinking party, Ramshorn's homosexual tendencies were exposed to the officer corps and had to be addressed. On 19 January 1925, Ramshorn was summoned before the responsible minister, who demanded that he immediately submit a request for his dismissal, and Ramshorn subsequently resigned from the police force. On 5 May 1925, he received a penal order for "unnatural lewdness", and his objection to this resulted in two appeal hearings, during which he emphatically denied all the allegations. The Neustrelitz Regional Court overturned the penal order for lack of evidence.

After leaving the police force, Ramshorn joined the far-right and antisemitic German Völkisch Freedom Party (DVFP), his first membership in an explicitly political group. Behind a legal facade, the DVFP gathered militant extremists from the Freikorps and created safe havens on agricultural estates where paramilitary groups of anti-republican activists gathered, secretly disguised as gymnastics clubs. As part of this clandestine activity, Ramshorn was given the position of administrator of the Zibühl estate in Mecklenburg. Behind this facade, he once again acted as a paramilitary organizer.

The true nature of the nationalist gymnastics clubs in Mecklenburg did not go unnoticed. On 23 July 1926, the Communist Party of Germany (KPD) faction in the Mecklenburg-Strelitz Landtag submitted a petition to the state ministry asking how long Ramshorn had been employed in the state police force and whether the government was aware of his past activities and his current whereabouts, bringing Ramshorn's ongoing anti-state activity into the public spotlight. The government denied any knowledge of Ramshorn's questionable activities. At about the same time, the Waren (Müritz) local branch of the Nationalverband Deutscher Offiziere (National Association of German Officers) initiated court proceedings against Ramshorn in connection with his alleged homosexuality. Ramshorn fled Mecklenburg in 1927 and settled in Breslau, his parents' hometown, where he worked as an insurance agent. Not much is known about Ramshorn's life from 1927 through 1930, though the little available data suggest a professional failure during the world economic crisis.

== Career in the Nazi Party and the SA ==
On 1 January 1931, Ramshorn joined the Nazi Party and its street-fighting unit, the Sturmabteilung (SA). The Party was experiencing a massive influx of new members and needed experienced personnel with a nationalist, paramilitary background to staff the growth of the SA. Ramshorn's background as a highly decorated, severely wounded World War I and Freikorps veteran made him a perfect candidate to assume a command and serve as an organizer in the now rapidly expanding SA. In the summer of 1931, Edmund Heines, who had recently been appointed commander of the SA in the province of Silesia, assigned Ramshorn to the command of SA-Standarte 11 in Breslau.

After years of a precarious existence, the SA offered Ramshorn the opportunity for a successful paramilitary career that corresponded to his militaristic and nationalistic anti-republican worldview. Furthermore, within the SA, he was able to indulge his homosexuality largely unchallenged. At an SA leadership conference in June 1932, Ramshorn was promoted to SA-Oberführer by SA-Stabschef Ernst Röhm and entrusted with the leadership of SA-Untergruppe Oberschlesien, based in Oppeln (today, Opole). He assumed this position on 1 July 1932, commanding all the SA forces in Upper Silesia, which numbered over 6,500.

In the November 1932 parliamentary election, Ramshorn was elected to the Reichstag from electoral constituency 9 (Oppeln). He was reelected in March and November 1933 and held this seat until his death. After the Nazi seizure of power in January 1933, Ramshorn was appointed acting Polizeipräsident (chief of police) of the Upper Silesian city of Gleiwitz (today, Gliwice) on 25 March 1933. He was subsequently promoted to SA-Brigadeführer, and he was advanced to permanent chief of police on 15 November 1933.

== Arrest and death ==
During the Night of the Long Knives, Ramshorn was placed on the list of high-ranking SA leaders in Silesia who were to be eliminated during Adolf Hitler's purge of the SA officer corps. All senior SA leaders present in Silesia were summoned under false pretenses to Breslau by the SS on the morning of 30 June 1934. On his way to Breslau, Ramshorn was intercepted in Oulau (today, Oława) by an SS detachment, who arrested him and escorted him to the Breslau police headquarters. In the afternoon, he was transferred to SS headquarters and, during the early morning hours of 1 July, he and seven other SA officers were transported by car to a forest north of Breslau by members of the 16th SS-Standarte. There, the eight men were shot and buried by SS personnel around 3:00 a.m. A few days later, the bodies were exhumed and cremated in a Breslau crematorium.

== Legal aftermath ==
The shooting of Ramshorn and twenty other people murdered in Silesia between 30 June and 2 July 1934 was the subject of criminal proceedings against the leader of the Silesian SS, Udo von Woyrsch, and the head of the Silesian Sicherheitsdienst (SD), Ernst Müller, who had supervised and commanded the SS actions in Silesia. This took place in 1957 before the regional court of Osnabrück. On 2 August 1957, Müller was acquitted due to lack of evidence, but Woyrsch was found guilty of aiding and abetting multiple cases of manslaughter, including that of Ramshorn, because he passed on the murder orders from Berlin. The court sentenced him to ten years in prison.

== Sources ==
- Information about Hans Ramshorn in the Reichstag database
- Schmidt, Daniel (2012). "Der SA-Führer Hans Ramshorn. Ein Leben zwischen Gewalt und Gemeinschaft (1892–1934)" (PDF). Vierteljahreshefte für Zeitgeschichte. 60 (2): 201–235.
- Stockhorst, Erich (1985). 5000 Köpfe: Wer War Was im 3. Reich. Arndt. ISBN 978-3-887-41116-9.
