= José Porfirio Miranda =

Mexican theologian and philosopher (1924–2001)

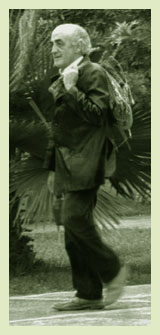
- Born: José Porfirio Miranda de la Parra; September 15, 1924; Monterrey, Mexico
- Died: October 9, 2001 (aged 77); Mexico City, Mexico

José Porfirio Miranda de la Parra (September 15, 1924 – October 9, 2001) was a Catholic Mexican theologian and philosopher. His works, including Comunismo en la Biblia, contributed to the study of Christian communism and liberation theology.

== Biography ==
Miranda was born in the city of Monterrey in 1924, the year after his family had moved there. The eldest son of Catholic parents, he grew up amidst religious persecution and his own family's financial problems. His father sent him to a Jesuit boarding school, Instituto Oriente in Puebla, where he decided on joining the Society of Jesus.

He studied a master's degree in philosophy at Loyola University in California. Miranda travelled around Europe and, on July 31st 1956, was ordained as a priest in Spain.

In 1974, Miranda was invited by Luis Villoro to teach philosophy at the newly established Universidad Autónoma Metropolitana. For Miranda, it was a place of debate, research and disseminating ideas. Two decades later, the university recognised him as a distinguished professor.

His most famous religious work, Communism in the Bible, was published in 1981. Its publication signaled his retirement from biblical studies and full devotion to philosophical matters.

On October 9th, 2001, Miranda died at the age of 77, after being diagnosed with lung cancer a month earlier. His final words, which are also on his epitaph, were reportedly, "I await the resurrection of the dead."

== Works ==
- Marx y la Biblia. Crítica a la Filosofía de la Opresión (1971)
- El Ser y el Mesías (1973)
- Communism in the Bible (1981)
- Apelo a la Razón: Teoría de la Ciencia y la Crítica del Positivismo (1983)
- Hegel Tenía Razón. El Mito de la Ciencia Empírica (1989)
- Racionalidad y Democracia (1990–1999)
