= Pamela Radcliff =

American academic and historian

- Born: 1956 (age 69–70); Passaic, New Jersey, U.S.
- Occupation: Historian
- Awards: Fulbright Fellowship (1992); Eleanor Roosevelt Award (1997); Keller-Sierra Prize (1998); UC Distinguished Teaching (1999)

Academic background
- Education: Scripps College, B.A.
- Alma mater: Columbia, M.A., Ph.D.

Academic work
- Era: 20th century
- Institutions: UC San Diego
- Main interests: Modern Spanish history, democracy, gender and citizenship

Pamela Beth Radcliff (born 1956) is an American historian and professor at the University of California at San Diego and an authority on the history of modern Spain. Her research focuses on mass politics, gender issues, civil society and democratic transitions. She did a Teaching Company course entitled Interpreting the 20th century: the Struggle over Democracy. Her publications on modern Spanish history received numerous positive reviews. She has received numerous awards for her scholarship and teaching, such as the Keller-Sierra Prize for her monograph From Mobilization to Civil War: The politics of polarization in the Spanish city of Gijón, 1900-1937.

== Selected publications ==
- Interpreting the 20th century: the Struggle over Democracy, The Teaching Company, Chantilly, Virginia, 2004
- From mobilization to Civil War: The politics of polarization in the Spanish city of Gijón, 1900-1937, Cambridge University Press, 1996) Published in 2004 by the editor Debate in Spanish with the title De la movilización a la Guerra Civil. Historia política y social de Gijón (1900-1937), pp. 269–271, p. (Palgrave Macmillan, 2011).
- Constructing Spanish Womanhood: Female Identity in Modern Spain, University of New York, 1998, (co-editor with Victoria Lorée Enders)
- Modern Spain: 1808 to the Present, John Wiley & Sons, May 8, 2017
- Making Democratic Citizens in Spain: Civil Society and the Popular Origins of the Transition, Basingstoke, Hampshire, UK; New York: Palgrave Macmillan, 2011. xvii plus 414 pp.

== Sources ==
- Cruz, Jesús (January 1998). "La polarización de la sociedad española. From mobilization to Civil War. The politics of polarization in the Spanish city of Gijón, 1900-1937. Pamela Radcliff. Cambridge University Press, Nueva York, 1996". Revista de Libros.
- Fesefeldt, Henrike (June 2006). "De la movilización a la Guerra Civil. Historia política y social de Gijón (1900-1937) by Pamela Beth Radcliff". Iberoamericana (2001-). 6 (22). Iberoamericana Editorial Vervuert: 269–271. ISSN 1577-3388. JSTOR 41676273.
- González Madrid, Damián Alberto (2012). "Radcliff, Pamela B., Making democratic citizens in Spain. Civil Society and the Popular Origins of the Transition, 1960-78". Vínculos de Historia (1). Universidad de Castilla-La Mancha: 325–329. ISSN 2254-6901.
- Messenger, David A. (2012). "Review of: Pamela Beth Radcliff, Making Democratic Citizens in Spain: Civil Society and the Popular Origins of the Transition, 1960-1978". Bulletin for Spanish and Portuguese Historical Studies. 37 (1): 221–223. Archived from the original on 2016-03-08.
- Miller, Montserrat (2000). "Constructing Spanish Womanhood: Female Identity in Modern Spain by Victoria Lorée Enders, Pamela Beth Radcliff". Journal of Social History. 34 (1). Oxford University Press: 206–208. doi:10.1353/jsh.2000.0118. ISSN 1527-1897. JSTOR 3789525.
- Seidman, Michael (March 1999). "From Mobilization to Civil War: The Politics of Polarization in the Spanish City of Gijon, 1900–1937. by Pamela Beth Radcliff". The Journal of Modern History. 71 (1). The University of Chicago Press: 221–223. doi:10.1086/235225. ISSN 1537-5358. JSTOR 10.1086/235225.
