= Common purse =

A common purse is any fund of money shared by a group for shared group purposes. The term is most frequently used by communes and Christian intentional communities who have adopted this practice based on Acts 2.
