= Workers of the world, unite! =

Rallying cry from The Communist Manifesto

The State Emblem of the Soviet Union had the slogan emblazoned on the ribbons in 15 languages spoken in the republics.

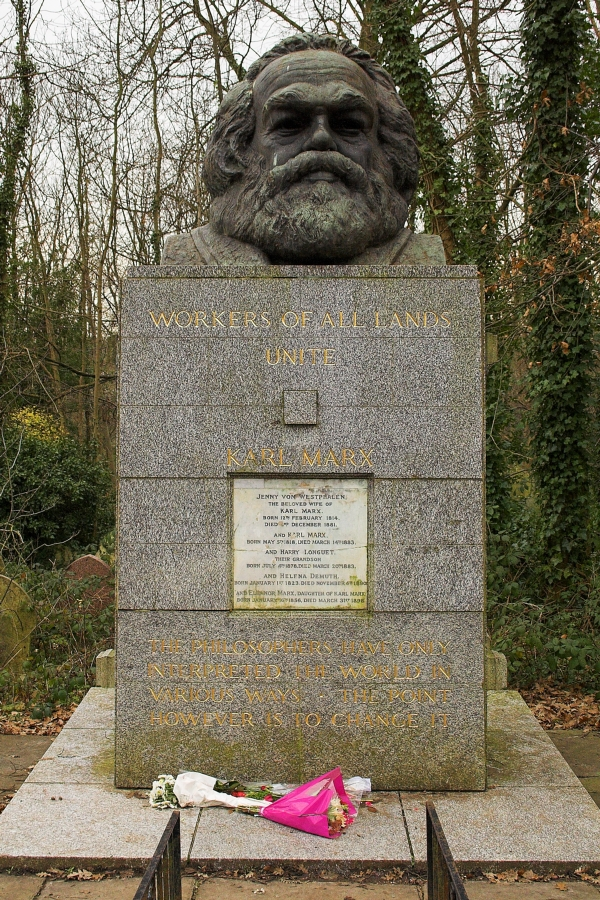
The tomb of Karl Marx at Highgate Cemetery bearing the slogan "Workers of All Lands Unite"

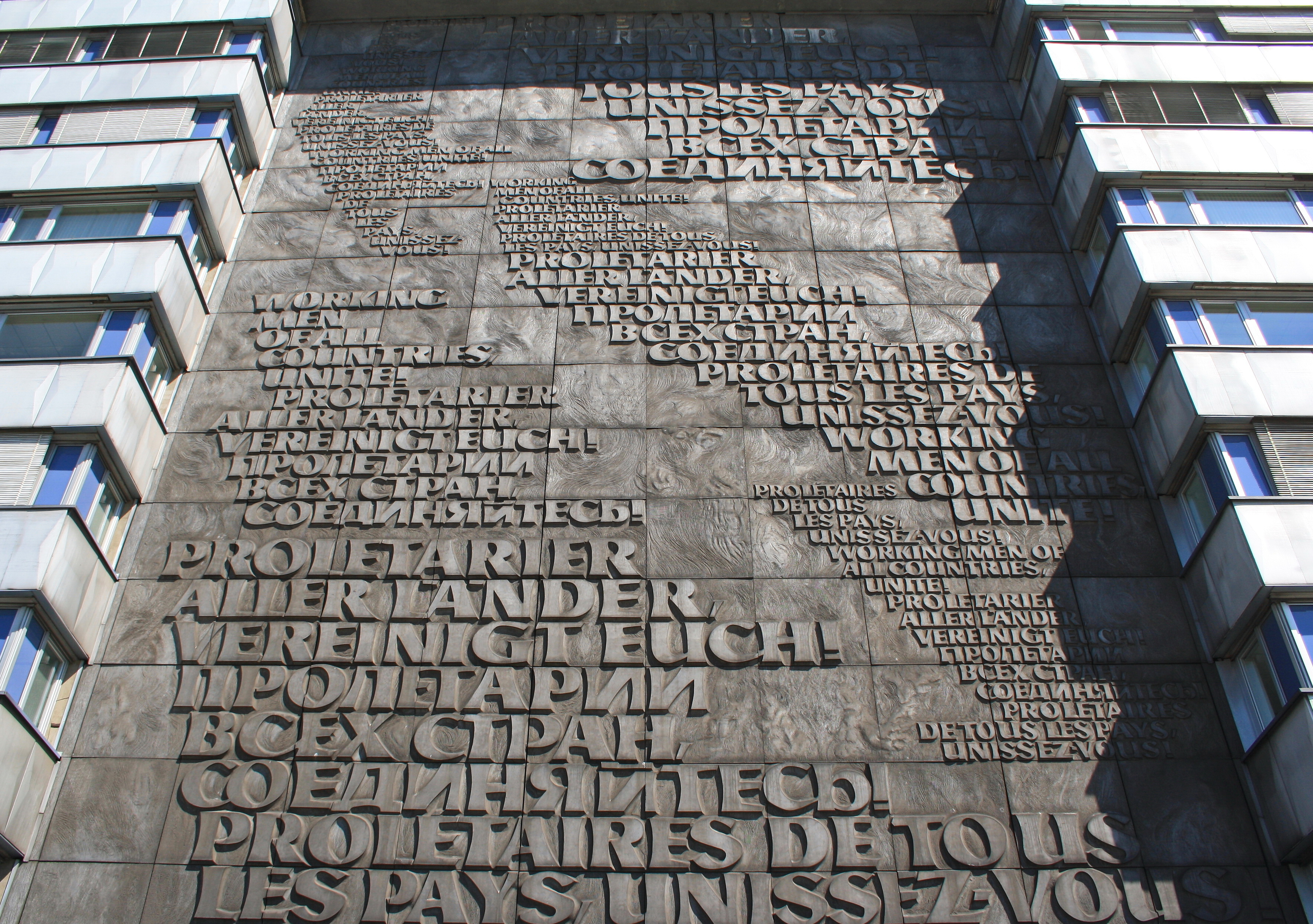
The slogan inscribed in four languages on a wall behind the Karl Marx Monument, Chemnitz, Germany

The political slogan "Workers of the world, unite!" is one of the rallying cries from The Communist Manifesto (1848) by Karl Marx and Friedrich Engels. The original phrase (German: Proletarier aller Länder, vereinigt Euch!) literally meant 'Proletarians of all countries, unite!', but was soon popularised in English as "Workers of the world, unite!" along with the rest of the phrase: "You have nothing to lose but your chains!". (Note: The final paragraph of The Communist Manifesto was translated by Samuel Moore as follows: "The Communists disdain to conceal their views and aims. They openly declare that their ends can be attained only by the forcible overthrow of all existing social conditions. Let the ruling classes tremble at a Communistic revolution. The proletarians have nothing to lose but their chains. They have a world to win. WORKING MEN OF ALL COUNTRIES, UNITE!". This translation is the authorized translation by Marx and Engels and is the most commonly used version in English.)

A variation of this phrase ("Workers of all lands, unite") is also inscribed on Marx's tombstone. The essence of the slogan is that members of the working classes throughout the world should cooperate to defeat capitalism and achieve victory in the class conflict.

== Overview ==
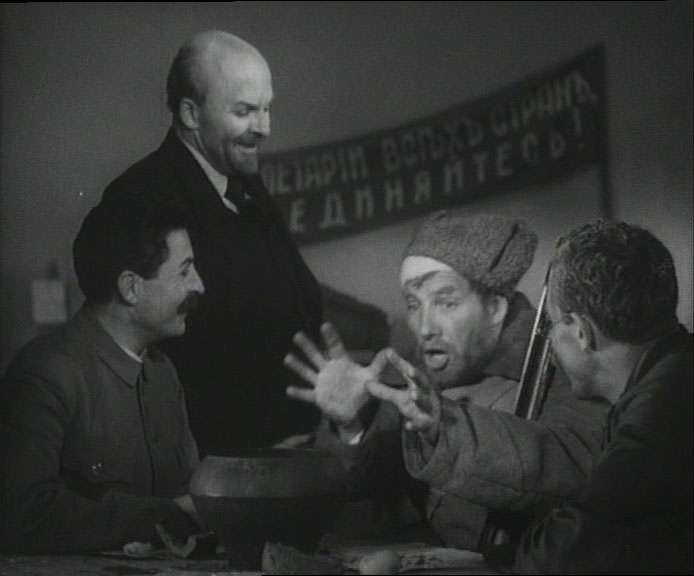
In this still from the historical drama The Man with the Gun, the phrase (in pre-reform Russian orthography) is depicted on a banner in the background.

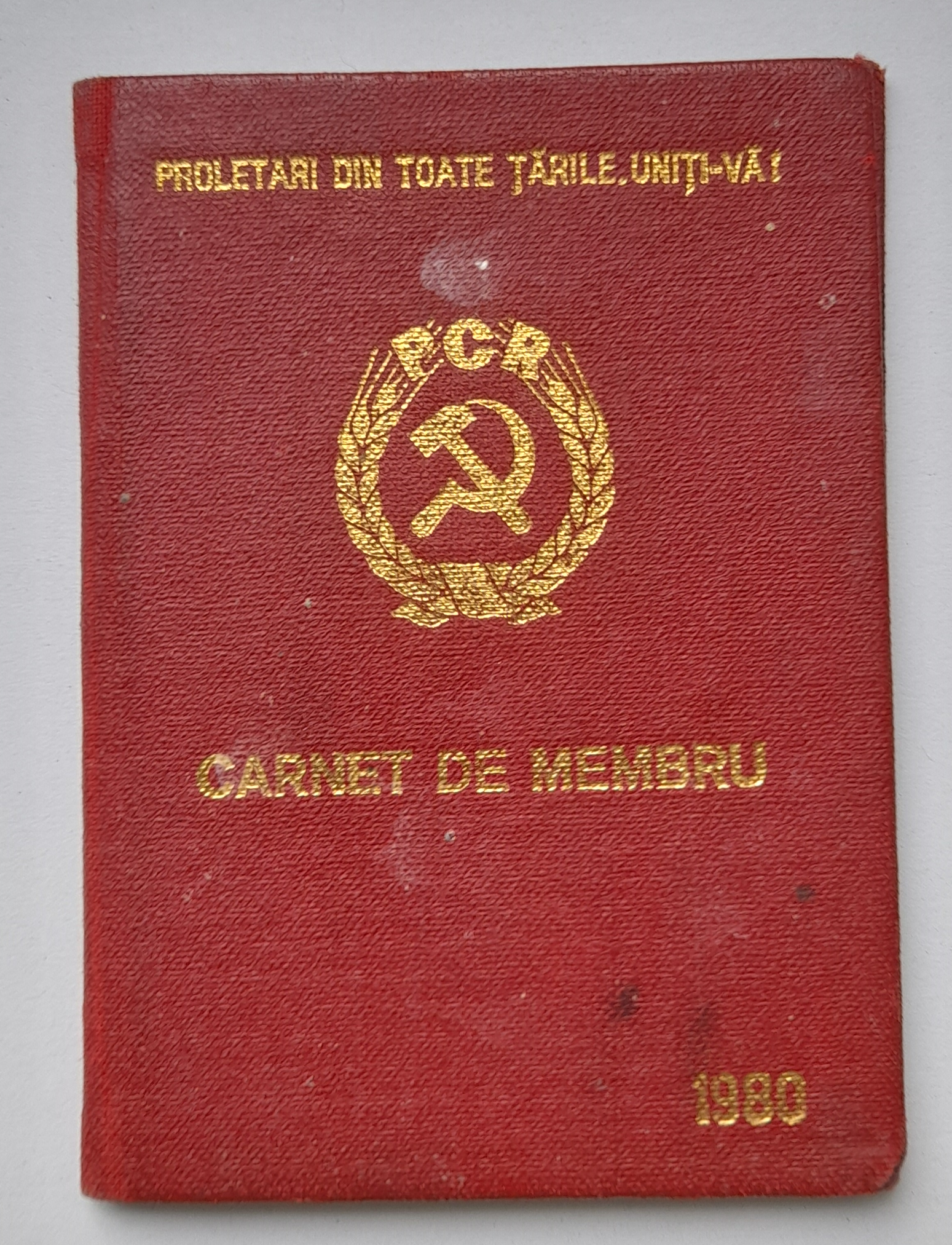
Membership card of the Romanian Communist Party from the year 1980. The slogan "Proletari din toate țările, uniți-vă!" is written in golden letters on the top of the Pass' cover.

Five years before The Communist Manifesto, this phrase appeared in the 1843 book The Workers' Union by Flora Tristan.

The Communist League, described by Engels as "the first international movement of the working class", was persuaded by Engels to change its motto from the League of the Just's "All men are brothers" to "Working men of all countries, unite!", reflecting Marx and Engels' view of proletarian internationalism.

The phrase has overlapping meanings: first, that workers should unite in unions to better push for their demands such as workplace pay and conditions; secondly, that workers should see beyond their various craft unions and unite against the capitalist system; and thirdly, that workers of different countries have more in common with each other than workers and employers of the same country.

The phrase was used by the Industrial Workers of the World (IWW) in their publications and songs and was a mainstay on banners in May Day demonstrations. The IWW used it when opposing World War I in both the United States and Australia.

The slogan in seven languages on the reverse of a Russian SFSR note for 5,000 rubles (1921)

The slogan was the Soviet Union's state motto (Пролетарии всех стран, соединяйтесь!; Proletarii vsekh stran, soyedinyaytes'!) and it appeared in the State Emblem of the Soviet Union. It also appeared on 1919 Russian SFSR banknotes (in Arabic, Chinese, English, French, German, Italian and Russian), on Soviet ruble coins from 1921 to 1934 and was the slogan of Soviet newspaper Pravda.

Some socialist and communist parties continue using it.

== Variations ==
In the first Swedish translation of The Communist Manifesto, published in 1848, the translator Pehr Götrek substituted the slogan with Folkets röst, Guds röst! (i.e. Vox populi, vox Dei, or "The Voice of the People, the Voice of God"). However, later translations have included the original slogan.

The guiding motto of the 2nd Comintern congress in 1920, under Lenin's directive, was "Workers and oppressed peoples of all countries, unite!". This denoted the anti-colonialist agenda of the Comintern, and was seen as an attempt to unite racially-subjugated black people and the global proletariat in anti-imperialist struggle.

== In other languages ==
This slogan was used by several socialist states and communist parties as their official motto.

=== Motto of the Soviet Union ===
In each Soviet republic, the same motto was used in the local language.

| Language | Motto | Transliteration | Used by |
|---|---|---|---|
| Russian | Пролетарии всех стран, соединяйтесь! (Note: Pre-revolution orthography: Пролетаріи всѣхъ странъ, соединяйтесь!) | Proletarii vsekh stran, soyedinyaytes'! (BGN/PCGN); Proletarii vseh stran, soědinäjteś! (Scientific) | Russian SFSR, Soviet Union |
| Ukrainian | Пролетарі всіх країн, єднайтеся! | Proletarii vsikh krayin, yednaytesya! (BGN/PCGN); Proletari vsich kraïn, jednajtesä! (Scientific) | Ukrainian SSR |
| Byelorussian | Пралетарыі ўсіх краін, яднайцеся! | Pralyetarye, wsikh krain, yadnaytsesya! (BGN/PCGN); Pralětaryi wsich krain, jadnajcěsya! (Scientific) | Byelorussian SSR |
| Uzbek | Бутун дунё пролетарлари, бирлашингиз! | Butun dunyo proletarlari, birlashingiz!/Butun dunyo proletarlari, birlaşingiz! | Uzbek SSR |
| Kazakh | Барлық елдердің пролетарлары, бірігіңдер! | Barlıq yelderdiñ proletarları, birigiñder! | Kazakh SSR |
| Georgian | პროლეტარებო ყველა ქვეყნისა, შეერთდით! | Proletarebo qvela kveqnisa, šeertdit! | Georgian SSR |
| Azerbaijani | Бүтүн өлкәләрин пролетарлары, бирләшин! | Bütün ölkələrin proletarları, birləşin! | Azerbaijan SSR, Dagestan ASSR |
| Lithuanian | Visų šalių proletarai, vienykitės! | | Lithuanian SSR |
| Romanian (Moldovan Cyrillic) | Пролетарь дин тоате цэриле, уници-вэ! | Proletari din toate țările, uniți-vă! | Moldavian SSR |
| Latvian | Visu zemju proletārieši, savienojieties! | | Latvian SSR |
| Kyrgyz | Бардык өлкөлордүн пролетарлары, бириккиле! | Bardıq ölkölordün proletarları, birikkile! | Kirghiz SSR |
| Tajik | Пролетарҳои ҳамаи мамлакатҳо, як шавед! | Proletarhoi hamai mamlakatho, yak šaved! | Tajik SSR |
| Armenian | Պրոլետարներ բոլոր երկրների, միացե՛ք | Proletarner bolor yerkrneri, miac’ek’! | Armenian SSR; Nagorno-Karabakh AO |
| Turkmen | Әхли юртларың пролетарлары, бирлешиң! | Ähli ýurtlaryň proletarlary, birleşiň!/Ähli yurtlarıñ proletarları, birleşiñ! | Turkmen SSR |
| Estonian | Kõigi maade proletaarlased, ühinege! | | Estonian SSR |
| Abaza | Акъральква зымгӏва рпролетарква, швадгыл! | Aqralıkua zьmyua rproletarkua, şvadgьl! | Karachay-Cherkess AO |
| Abkhaz | Атәылаӄуа зегьы рпролетарцәа, шәҽеидышәкыл! | Atwylaqwa zeğy rproletarcwa, šwč’eidyšwkyl! | Abkhaz ASSR |
| Altai | Бастыра ороондордыҥ пролетарийлери, бириккилегер! | Bastıra oroondordıñ proletariyleri, birikkileger! | Gorno-Altai AO |
| Avar | Киналго улкабазул пролетарал, цолъе нуж! | Kinalgo ulkabazul proletaral, col’e nuž! | Dagestan ASSR |
| Bashkir | Бөтә илдәрҙең пролетарийҙәре, берләшегеҙ! | Böte ilderceń proletariycäre, berläşegec! | Bashkir ASSR |
| Buryat | Бүхы оронуудай пролетаринар, нэгэдэгты! | Bühy oronuudaj proletarinar, negedegty! | Buryat ASSR |
| Chechen | Массо а мехкийн пролетарийш, цхьаьнакхета! | Masso a mеxkiyn prolеtariyš, cẋänaqеta! | Checheno-Ingush ASSR; Dagestan ASSR |
| Chuvash | Пӗтӗм тӗнчери пролетарисем, пӗрлешӗр! | Pétém ténçeri proletarisem, pérleşér! | Chuvash ASSR |
| Crimean Tatar | Бютюн мемлекетлерининъ пролетарлары, бирлешинъиз! | Bütün memleketleriniñ proletarları, birleşiñiz! | Crimean ASSR |
| Erzya | Весе масторонь пролетарийть, вейсэндяводо! | Vese mastoronj proletarijtj, vejsendjavodo! | Mordovian ASSR |
| Finnish | Kaikkien maiden proletaarit, liittykää yhteen! | | Karelo-Finnish SSR, Karelian ASSR |
| Gagauz | Бӱтӱн дӱннейин пролетарлары, бирлешиниз! | Bütün dünneyin proletarları, birleşiniz! | Moldavian SSR |
| Hill Mari | Цила сӓндӓлӹквлаштыш пролетарийвла, ушныда! | Cila sändälÿkvlaštyš proletarijvla, ušnyda! | Mari ASSR |
| Ingush | Масса а мехкашкара пролетареш, вӏашагӏкхета! | Massa a mеxkaškara prolеtarеš, vjašaghqеta! | Checheno-Ingush ASSR |
| Kabardian | Хэгъэгу пстэухэм япролетариехэр, зы шъухъу! | Xeğegu psteuxem japroletariěxer, zy š’uhu! | Kabardino-Balkarian ASSR; Karachay-Cherkess AO |
| Kalmyk | Цуг-орн нутгудын пролетармуд, негдцхәтн! | Cug-orn nutgudyn proletarmud, negdchâtn! | Kalmyk ASSR |
| Karachay-Balkar | Бютеу дунияны пролетарлары, бирлешигиз! | Bütew duniyanı proletarları, birleşigiz! | Kabardino-Balkar ASSR; Karachay-Cherkess AO |
| Karakalpak | Барлық еллердиң пролетарлары, бирлесиңиз! | Barlıq ellerdiñ proletarları, birlesiñiz! | Karakalpak ASSR |
| Karelian | Kaikkien maijen proletaariet, yhtykkyä! | | Karelian ASSR (until 1940) |
| Khakas | Прай страналарның пролетарийлері, піріклеңер! | Pray stranalarnıñ proletariylerį, pįrįkleñer! | Khakas AO |
| Komi | Став мувывса пролетарийяс, oтувтчӧй! | Stav muvyvsa proletarijjas, otuvtčöj! | Komi ASSR |
| Kurdish | Пролетаред һ'аму ԝәлата, йәнбьн! | Proletared ħamu wəlata, jənbьn! | Kurds |
| Meadow Mari | Чыла элласе пролетарий-влак, ушныза! | Çyla ellase proletarij-vlak, uşnyza! | Mari ASSR |
| Moksha | Сембе масторонь пролетариятне, пуромода марс! | Sembe mastoronj proletarijatnje, puromoda mars! | Mordovian ASSR |
| Ossetian | Ӕппӕт бӕстӕты пролетартӕ, баиу ут! | Æppæt bæstæty proletartæ, baiu ut! | North Ossetian ASSR; South Ossetian AO |
| Sakha | Бары дойдулар пролетарийдара, холбоһуҥ! | Barı doydular proletariydara, xolbohuň! | Yakut ASSR |
| Tat | Пролетарьой гьеме билеетгьо, ек бошти! | Proletar'oy heme bileetho, ek boşti! | Dagestan ASSR |
| Tatar | Барлык илләрнең пролетарийлары, берләшегез! | Barlıq illärneñ proletariyları, berläşegez! | Tatar ASSR |
| Tuvan | Бүгү делегейниң пролетарлары, каттыжыңар! | Bügü delegeyniñ proletarları, kattıjıñar! | Tuvan ASSR |
| Udmurt | Вань странаосысь пролетарийёс, огазеяське! | Vań stranaosyś proletarijjos, ogazejaśke! | Udmurt ASSR |

=== Motto of other countries ===
| Language | Motto | Transliteration | Used by |
|---|---|---|---|
| Albanian | Proletarë të të gjitha vendeve, bashkohuni! | | Albania |
| Bulgarian | Пролетарии от всички страни съединявайте се! | Proletárii ot vsíchki straní, sǎеdinyávaite se! | Bulgaria |
| Chinese | 全世界無産階級和被壓迫的民族聯合起來！ (Note: This is not the usual modern Chinese translation of the slogan. The most common one nowadays is 全世界無産者，聯合起來！ (Quánshìjiè wúchǎnzhě, liánhé qǐlái!)) | Quánshìjiè wúchǎnjiējí hé bèi yāpò de mínzú liánhé qǐlai! | Chinese Soviet Republic |
| Czech | Proletáři všech zemí, spojte se! | | Czechoslovakia |
| Dari | کارگران جهان متحد شوید! | Kârgarân-e jahân mottahed šavid! | Afghanistan |
| French | Prolétaires de tous les pays, unissez-vous ! | | Benin, Madagascar |
| German | Proletarier aller Länder, vereinigt Euch! | | East Germany, Volga German ASSR |
| Hungarian | Világ proletárjai, egyesüljetek! | | Hungarian People's Republic, Hungarian Soviet Republic |
| Korean | 전세계로동자들은 단결하라! | Chŏnsegyelodongchadŭrŭn tangyŏl'ala! | North Korea |
| Malagasy | Mpiasa eran'izao tontolo izao, mampiray! | | Madagascar |
| Mongolian | Орон бүрийн пролетари нар нэгдэгтүн! | Oron büriin proletari nar negdegtün! | Mongolia |
| Polish | Proletariusze wszystkich krajów, łączcie się! | | Polish People's Republic |
| Romanian | Proletari din toate țările, uniți-vă! | | Romania |
| Slovak | Proletári všetkých krajín, spojte sa! | | Czechoslovakia, Slovak Soviet Republic |
| Tuvan | Бүгү телегейниң пролетарлары болгаш дарлаткан араттары каттыжыңар! | Pygy delegejniꞑ вroledarlarь polgaş tarladkan araddarь kaddьƶьꞑar! | Tuvan People's Republic |

==== Motto of communist parties ====
The English phrase and its variants (the variant "All power to the workers" is used by some parties such as the Communist Party of Australia) are used by communist parties in the English-speaking world. The list below does not include the mottos of communist parties of the above countries or in languages listed above.

| Language | Motto | Transliteration | Used by | Active in |
|---|---|---|---|---|
| Arabic | يَا عُمَّالَ الْعَالَمِ وَيَا شُعُوبَهُ الْمُضْطَهَدَة، اِتَّحِدُواْ! | Ya ‘ummāla l-‘ālami wa yā shu‘ūbahu l-muṭṭahada, ittaḥidū! | Jordanian Communist Party | Jordan |
| Bengali | দুনিয়ার মজদুর, এক হও! | Duniẏār môjdur, ēk hôō! | Communist Party of Bangladesh | Bangladesh |
| Greek | Προλετάριοι όλων των χωρών, ενωθείτε! | Proletárioi ólon ton chorón, enotheíte! | Communist Party of Greece | Greece |
| Indonesian | Para buruh seluruh dunia, bersatulah! | | Communist Party of Indonesia | Indonesia |
| Macedonian | Пролетери од сите земји, обединете се! | Proleteri od site zemji, obedinete se! | League of Communists of Macedonia | Yugoslavia |
| Malay | Kaum buruh semua negeri, bersatulah! | | Malayan Communist Party | Malaysia |
| Serbo-Croatian | Пролетери свих земаља уједините се! | Proleteri svih zemalja, ujedinite se! | League of Communists of Yugoslavia | Yugoslavia |
| Slovene | Proletarci vseh dežel, združite se! | | League of Communists of Slovenia | Yugoslavia |
| Tagalog | Manggagawa ng lahat ng bansa, magkaisa! | | Communist Party of the Philippines | Philippines |
| Turkish | Bütün ülkelerin işçileri ve ezilen halklar, birleşin! (Note: Literally "Workers of all countries and oppressed people, unite!) | | Socialist Liberation Party | Turkey |

== See also ==
- Communist society
- From each according to his ability, to each according to his needs
- Labour movement
- Proletarian internationalism
- Social patriotism
- World communism
- World revolution
