= Adonai-Shomo =

Religious commune

Adonai-Shomo was the name given to a commune which existed from 1861 to 1896 in Massachusetts.

== Second Coming ==
The commune was founded by Frederick T. Howland, a Quaker who had become convinced that the Second Coming of Christ and the subsequent Last Judgement would come shortly. On that basis, he started the commune, with initially roughly 30 members.

== New leaders ==
Some years later, Howland died in an accident, leaving a leadership vacuum in the community. A man named Cook arrived and said that God had sent him to take over the community. The members of the group accepted him initially. However, Cook later began to institute some unusual sexual practices into the group, which led the members to depose him from the leadership and initiate criminal charges against him. Cook was replaced by a man named Richards, who led the group for several years, during which time it prospered and was able to purchase 840 acres (3.4 km^{2}) near Petersham, Massachusetts.

== Disbanding ==
In time, the older members of the commune began to die off, and several of the younger members left. Eventually, a group of the younger members filed suit against Richards to gain partial control of the group's property, eventually winning the suit. However, the money from the sale of the commune's land was barely sufficient to cover the group's debts and legal fees, leading the group to disband in 1896.
