= Church of Bible Understanding =

Evangelical Christian organization

The Church of Bible Understanding (first known as the Forever Family) is an American new religious movement founded in Allentown, Pennsylvania, in 1971 by Stewart Traill. It is a communal organization, teaching a form of evangelical Christianity. The group has been accused of being a cult and the source of millions in income for Traill, who died in 2018.

In the 1970s, with its headquarters in New York, it developed into a controversial network of churches with 10,000 members and 110 communes at its peak, but only a few hundred members in later years.

== History ==
=== Beginnings ===
Stewart Traill underwent a conversion experience in the early 1970s in Allentown, joined a Pentecostal church from which he was expelled, and began teaching Bible and developing a following. He changed the name of the "Forever Family" to the "Church of Bible Understanding" in 1976.

Ex-members complained that they worked for very low wages, with all the money going to the church. The group had a communal lifestyle, with Traill maintaining that only he can understand the true meaning of the words of God. Traill encourages his group members to break off contact with their families. Over time, the members decreased in number. The group has been accused of being a cult, and it has been estimated that Traill became a millionaire from it.

Rev. Bruce Ritter of Covenant House accused The Church of Bible Understanding of enticing 17 youth out of the shelter with promises of salvation, and a state court enjoined them from housing or transporting youth under age 18 without parental permission.

=== Business ventures ===
Their carpet-cleaning business, "Christian Brothers Carpet Cleaning", was the inspiration for Seinfeld's "Sunshine Carpet Cleaning Cult". They also started a used-van business as a commercial venture.

The group's only successful venture is Olde Good Things, New York City-based retail stores selling architectural salvage goods and antiques. In 2017, the stores funnelled $6.8 million to the Church of Bible Understanding, according to the nonprofit's tax filing for that year.

In the 1990s, Stewart and wife Gayle ran S&G Photographic Equipment in Philadelphia, PA. They sold professional large and medium format cameras, lighting equipment, film, photographic chemicals and paper, and other equipment. Their catalog reached customers on their mailing list by postal mail.

=== Haitian orphanages ===
In November 2013, the Associated Press investigated claims that the church was at fault for running substandard housing for orphans in Haiti after the two homes the church runs received a failing grade from the Haitian agency that monitors orphanages. "...Even though they claim in IRS filings to be spending around $2.5 million annually, the home for boys and girls was so dirty and overcrowded during recent inspections that the government said it shouldn't remain open."

On February 14, 2020, one "orphanage", run by the organization in Haiti, burned down, killing 15 children; two burned to death and the others died from smoke inhalation, according to a BBC World News report. The cause was alleged to be candles being lit, the facility's generator being inoperative.

=== Founder death ===
Stewart Traill, the long-time leader of the group, died in 2018.
