= Arnold Ehrhardt =

German jurist and British theologian

Arnold Anton Traugott Ehrhardt (14 May 1903 in Königsberg to 18 February 1965 in Manchester) was a German jurist and British theologian.

== Life ==
Arnold was the son of Oscar Ehrhardt, a professor of surgery, and Martha, née Rosenhain, a school teacher from a Jewish family. He went to school in Königsberg and then studied law at Erlangen, Bonn, Berlin and Königsberg. After the First World War he served in the eastern border force and took part in the conflict with the Spartacists. He took his doctoral degree in 1926 in Königsberg and the following year became an assistant to Fritz Pringsheim in Göttingen and took his habilitation in civil and Roman law in 1929 in Freiburg. He lectured at the Goethe University of Frankfurt. As a "half-Jew" he was threatened with dismissal; in the winter semester 1934/35 he taught at the University of Lausanne. When his lectures in Frankfurt were boycotted in the summer semester of 1935, he publicly declared his Jewish ancestry.

Ehrhardt moved to Lörrach to study theology with Karl Barth in neighbouring Basel. When he learned of his impending arrest at the beginning of 1939, he went with his immediate family to Switzerland and then emigrated to England. With financial help from the Church of England, he continued his theological studies – after a brief interruption by internment as an "enemy alien" in May 1940 – at the University of Cambridge and was awarded a doctorate in 1944. He was assistant curate in a Manchester parish. He also did research in ecclesiastical and legal history, publishing his findings mostly in German. From 1956 at the latest he was working as an Anglican priest in Heywood. In 1958 he was appointed Bishop Fraser Senior Lecturer in Church History at the Victoria University of Manchester; The Ehrhardt Seminar at the Centre for Biblical Studies at the University of Manchester is named for him.

In 1951 and 1957 Ehrhardt declined offers of professorships in law at the Philipps University of Marburg and the Goethe University of Frankfurt.
